= 2010 Australia rugby union tour of Asia and Europe =

2010 Australia tour of Asia and Europe
- Date: 30 October – 27 November 2010
- Coach: Robbie Deans
- Tour captain: Rocky Elsom
Summary
P	W	D	L
Total
7	5	0	2
Test match
5	4	0	1
Opponent
P	W	D	L
New Zealand
1	1	0	0
Wales
1	1	0	0
England
1	0	0	1
Italy
1	1	0	0
France
1	1	0	0

Tour chronology
- ← 2009 Asia & Europe 2013 Europe →

The 2010 Australia rugby union tour of Asia and Europe, colloquially known as the 2010 Wallabies Spring Tour, was a rugby union tour by the Australia national rugby team that took place in October and November 2010, and was part of the 2010 Autumn Internationals test window. The initial tour took place in Hong Kong in East Asia before finishing in Europe. The tour was very successful, with Australia winning four of their five test match tour fixtures. The tour also saw a record performance from 20-year-old James O'Connor in the final test of the tour against France. O'Connor, who had played 26 tests for the Wallabies, scored a record 29 points in the match, including one try, six conversions (from seven attempts), and four penalty goals (from five attempts). Australia defeated France 16–59 in the Stade de France, which stands as their biggest ever victory against them.

== Fixtures ==
Date	Venue	Home	Score	Away
30 October	Hong Kong Stadium, Causeway Bay	Australia	26–24	New Zealand
6 November	Millennium Stadium, Cardiff	Wales	16–25	Australia
9 November	Welford Road Stadium, Leicester	Leicester Tigers	15–26	Australia
13 November	Twickenham Stadium, London	England	35–18	Australia
16 November	Thomond Park, Limerick	Munster	15–6	Australia
20 November	Stadio Artemio Franchi, Florence	Italy	14–32	Australia
27 November	Stade de France, Saint-Denis	France	16–59	Australia

== Matches ==
=== First test ===
30 October 2010
16:30 HKT (UTC+08)

Australia	26–24	New Zealand
Try: Cooper 8' m Ashley-Cooper 23' c Mitchell 60' c O'Connor 80+1' c Con: Giteau (1/2); O'Connor (2/2)	Report	Try: Cowan 30' c Jane 33' c Nonu 53' c Con: Carter (3/3); Pen: Carter 40+1'

Hong Kong Stadium, Hong Kong
Attendance: 26,210
Referee: Alain Rolland (Ireland)

FB	15	Kurtley Beale
RW	14	James O'Connor
OC	13	Adam Ashley-Cooper
IC	12	Matt Giteau	(substituted off) 63'
LW	11	Drew Mitchell
FH	10	Quade Cooper
SH	9	Will Genia	(substituted off) 76'
N8	8	Ben McCalman
OF	7	David Pocock
BF	6	Rocky Elsom (c)
RL	5	Nathan Sharpe
LL	4	Mark Chisholm	(substituted off) 72'
TP	3	Ben Alexander
HK	2	Stephen Moore	(substituted off) 62'
LP	1	Benn Robinson	(substituted off) 51'
Replacements:
HK	16	Saia Fainga'a	(substituted on) 62'
PR	17	James Slipper	(substituted on) 51'
LK	18	Dean Mumm	(substituted on) 72'
N8	19	Richard Brown
SH	20	Luke Burgess	(substituted on) 76'
FH	21	Berrick Barnes	(substituted on) 63'
WG	22	Lachlan Turner
Coach:
Robbie Deans

FB	15	Mils Muliaina
RW	14	Cory Jane	(substituted off) 51'
OC	13	Conrad Smith
IC	12	Ma'a Nonu
LW	11	Joe Rokocoko
FH	10	Daniel Carter	(substituted off) 60'
SH	9	Jimmy Cowan	(substituted off) 72'
N8	8	Kieran Read
OF	7	Richie McCaw (c)
BF	6	Jerome Kaino
RL	5	Tom Donnelly	(substituted off) 66'
LL	4	Brad Thorn
TP	3	Owen Franks	(substituted off) 60'
HK	2	Keven Mealamu
LP	1	Tony Woodcock
Replacements:
HK	16	Hika Elliot
PR	17	John Afoa	(substituted on) 60'
LK	18	Sam Whitelock	(substituted on) 66'
OF	19	Daniel Braid
SH	20	Alby Mathewson	(substituted on) 72'
FH	21	Stephen Donald	(substituted on) 60'
UB	22	Isaia Toeava	(substituted on) 51'
Coach:
Graham Henry

Touch judges:
George Clancy (Ireland)
Simon McDowell (Ireland)
Television match official:
Matt Goddard (Australia)

=== Second test ===
6 November 2010
14:30 GMT (UTC+0)

Wales	16–25	Australia
Try: Rees 70' c Con: Biggar (1/1); Pen: S. Jones (3/5) 1', 31', 52'	Report	Try: Pocock 6' c Beale 47' c Alexander 60' m Con: O'Connor (2/3); Pen: O'Connor (2/3) 64', 73'

Millennium Stadium, Cardiff
Attendance: 53,127
Referee: Wayne Barnes (England)

FB	15	James Hook
RW	14	Will Harries
OC	13	Tom Shanklin	(yellow card) 63' to 73'	(substituted off) 76'
IC	12	Andrew Bishop
LW	11	Shane Williams
FH	10	Stephen Jones		(substituted off) 65'
SH	9	Mike Phillips		(substituted off) 65'
N8	8	Jonathan Thomas
OF	7	Sam Warburton		(substituted off) 65'
BF	6	Dan Lydiate
RL	5	Alun Wyn Jones		(substituted off) 74'
LL	4	Bradley Davies
TP	3	Adam Jones
HK	2	Matthew Rees (c)		(substituted off) 75'
LP	1	Gethin Jenkins		(substituted off) 71'
Replacements:
HK	16	Huw Bennett		(substituted on) 75'
PR	17	Paul James		(substituted on) 71'
LK	18	Deiniol Jones		(substituted on) 74'
FL	19	Martyn Williams		(substituted on) 65'
SH	20	Richie Rees		(substituted on) 65'
FH	21	Dan Biggar		(substituted on) 65'
WG	22	Chris Czekaj		(substituted on) 76'
Coach:
Warren Gatland

FB	15	Kurtley Beale
RW	14	James O'Connor
OC	13	Adam Ashley-Cooper
IC	12	Matt Giteau	(substituted off) 67'
LW	11	Drew Mitchell
FH	10	Quade Cooper
SH	9	Will Genia	(substituted off) 74'
N8	8	Ben McCalman
OF	7	David Pocock
BF	6	Rocky Elsom (c)
RL	5	Nathan Sharpe
LL	4	Mark Chisholm	(substituted off) 75'
TP	3	Ben Alexander	(substituted off) 62'
HK	16^{[a]}	Saia Fainga'a	(substituted off) 54'
LP	1	Benn Robinson
Replacements:
HK	26	Huia Edmonds	(substituted on) 54'
PR	17	James Slipper	(substituted on) 62'
LK	18	Dean Mumm	(substituted on) 75'
N8	19	Richard Brown
SH	20	Luke Burgess	(substituted on) 74'
FH	21	Berrick Barnes	(substituted on) 67'
WG	22	Lachlan Turner
Coach:
Robbie Deans

Touch judges:
Chris Pollock (New Zealand)
Peter Allan (Scotland)
Television match official:
Graham Hughes (England)

=== Leicester Tigers ===
9 November 2010
19:30 GMT (UTC+0)

Leicester Tigers	15–26	Australia
Pen: Twelvetrees (5/5) 26', 65'	Report	Try: Turner; Higginbotham; Con: Barnes (2/2); Pen: Barnes (3/5) 2'; Drop: Barnes (1/1) 79'

Welford Road Stadium, Leicester
Attendance: 20,299
Referee: Jonathan Kaplan (South Africa)

FB	15	Geordan Murphy (c)
RW	14	Scott Hamilton
OC	13	Matt Smith	(substituted off) 76'
IC	12	Anthony Allen
LW	11	Manu Tuilagi
FH	10	Billy Twelvetrees
SH	9	James Grindal
N8	8	Thomas Waldrom	(substituted off) 62'
OF	7	Jordan Crane
BF	6	Craig Newby
RL	5	George Skivington
LL	4	Ed Slater
TP	3	Julian White
HK	2	George Chuter	(substituted off) 65'
LP	1	Pete Bucknall
Replacements:
HK	16	Rob Hawkins	(substituted on) 65'
PR	17	Gastón de Robertis
LK	18	Steve Mafi	(substituted on) 62'
FL	19	Ben Pienaar
SH	20	Jason Spice
SH	21	George Ford
CE	22	Dan Hipkiss	(substituted on) 76'
Coach:
Richard Cockerill

FB	15	Peter Hynes
RW	14	Rod Davies
OC	13	Pat McCabe
IC	12	Anthony Fainga'a
LW	11	Lachlan Turner	(substituted off) 65'
FH	10	Berrick Barnes (c)
SH	9	Luke Burgess
N8	8	Richard Brown
OF	7	Matt Hodgson	(substituted off) 65'
BF	6	Scott Higginbotham
RL	5	Rob Simmons	(substituted off) 65'
LL	4	Van Humphries
TP	3	Salesi Ma'afu
HK	2	Huia Edmonds	(substituted off) 65'
LP	1	Ben Daley
Replacements:
HK	16	Saia Fainga'a	(substituted on) 65'
PR	17	James Slipper
LK	18	Dean Mumm	(substituted on) 65'
N8	19	Pat McCutcheon	(substituted on) 65'
SH	20	Nick Phipps
CE	21	Kurtley Beale
WG	22	Luke Morahan	(substituted on) 65'
Coach:
Robbie Deans

=== Third test ===
13 November 2010
14:30 GMT (UTC+0)

England	35–18	Australia
Try: Ashton 25' c, 47' c Con: Flood (2/2); Pen: Flood (7) 11', 34', 38', 42', 57', 69', 77'	Report	Try: Beale (2) 54' c, 65' m Con: O'Connor (1/2); Pen: O'Connor (2) 31', 39'

Twickenham Stadium, London
Attendance: 80,002
Referee: Craig Joubert (South Africa)

FB	15	Ben Foden
RW	14	Chris Ashton
OC	13	Mike Tindall	(substituted off) 63'
IC	12	Shontayne Hape
LW	11	Mark Cueto
FH	10	Toby Flood	(substituted off) 78'
SH	9	Ben Youngs	(substituted off) 58'
N8	8	Nick Easter	(substituted off) 78'
OF	7	Lewis Moody (c)
BF	6	Tom Croft
RL	5	Tom Palmer	(substituted off) 71'
LL	4	Courtney Lawes
TP	3	Dan Cole
HK	2	Dylan Hartley	(substituted off) 70'
LP	1	Andrew Sheridan	(substituted off) 70'
Replacements:
HK	16	Steve Thompson	(substituted on) 70'
PR	17	David Wilson	(substituted on) 70'
LK	18	Simon Shaw	(substituted on) 71'
FL	19	Hendre Fourie	(substituted on) 78'
SH	20	Danny Care	(substituted on) 58'
FH	21	Charlie Hodgson	(substituted on) 78'
FB	22	Delon Armitage	(substituted on) 63'
Coach:
Martin Johnson

FB	15	Kurtley Beale
RW	14	James O'Connor
OC	13	Adam Ashley-Cooper
IC	12	Matt Giteau	(yellow card) 37' to 47' (substituted off) 59'
LW	11	Drew Mitchell
FH	10	Quade Cooper
SH	9	Will Genia	(substituted off) 48'
N8	8	Ben McCalman	(substituted off) 58'
OF	7	David Pocock
BF	6	Rocky Elsom (c)
RL	5	Nathan Sharpe
LL	4	Mark Chisholm	(substituted off) 58'
TP	3	Ben Alexander
HK	2	Stephen Moore
LP	1	Benn Robinson	(substituted off) 56'
Replacements:
HK	16	Saia Fainga'a
PR	17	James Slipper	(substituted on) 56'
LK	18	Dean Mumm	(substituted on) 58'
N8	19	Richard Brown	(substituted on) 58'
SH	20	Luke Burgess	(substituted on) 48'
CE	21	Berrick Barnes	(substituted on) 63'
WG	22	Lachlan Turner
Coach:
Robbie Deans

Touch judges:
Christophe Berdos (France)
Simon McDowell (Ireland)
Television match official:
Jim Yuille (Scotland)

=== Munster ===
16 November 2010
20:00 IST (UTC+1)

Munster	15–6	Australia
Pen: Warwick (3); Drop: Warwick (2)	Report	Pen: Barnes (2)

Thomond Park, Limerick
Referee: Bryce Lawrence (New Zealand)

FB	15	Johne Murphy
RW	14	Doug Howlett
OC	13	Keith Earls
IC	12	Sam Tuitupou
LW	11	Denis Hurley
FH	10	Paul Warwick
SH	9	Duncan Williams
N8	8	James Coughlan (c)
OF	7	Niall Ronan
BF	6	Peter O'Mahony
RL	5	Ian Nagle
LL	4	Billy Holland
TP	3	Peter Borlase
HK	2	Damien Varley
LP	1	Wian du Preez
Replacements:
HK	16	Mike Sherry
PR	17	Stephen Archer
LK	18	Alan Quinlan
FL	19	Tommy O'Donnell
SH	20	Conor Murray
SH	21	Scott Deasy
CE	22	Barry Murphy
Coach:
Tony McGahan

FB	15	Lachlan Turner
RW	14	Rodney Davies
OC	13	Pat McCabe
IC	12	Anthony Fainga'a
LW	11	Luke Morahan
FH	10	Berrick Barnes (c)
SH	9	Luke Burgess
N8	8	Richard Brown
OF	7	Matt Hodgson
BF	6	Scott Higginbotham
RL	5	Rob Simmons
LL	4	Dean Mumm
TP	3	Salesi Ma'afu
HK	2	Saia Fainga'a
LP	1	Ben Daley
Replacements:
HK	16	Tatafu Polota-Nau
PR	17	James Slipper
LK	18	Van Humphries
FL	19	Pat McCutcheon
SH	20	Nick Phipps
SH	21	Matt Giteau
CE	22	Peter Hynes
Coach:
Robbie Deans

=== Fourth test ===
20 November 2010
15:00 CET (UTC+01)

Italy	14–32	Australia
Try: Barbieri 71' m Pen: Bergamasco (2) 11', 40'; Orquera 35'	Report	Try: Mitchell 9' c Elsom 80' c Con: Barnes (2/2); Pen: Barnes (6/6) 2', 13', 50', 53', 59', 67'

Stadio Artemio Franchi, Florence
Attendance: 40,127
Referee: Christophe Berdos (France)

FB	15	Luke McLean
RW	14	Tommaso Benvenuti
OC	13	Gonzalo Canale
IC	12	Alberto Sgarbi	(substituted off) 60'
LW	11	Mirco Bergamasco
FH	10	Luciano Orquera	(substituted off) 67'
SH	9	Edoardo Gori	(substituted off) 60'
N8	8	Sergio Parisse (c)
OF	7	Alessandro Zanni
BF	6	Paul Derbyshire	(substituted off) 55'
RL	5	Quintin Geldenhuys
LL	4	Carlo Del Fava	(substituted off) 67'
TP	3	Martin Castrogiovanni	(substituted off) 55'
HK	2	Fabio Ongaro	(substituted off) 48'
LP	1	Andrea Lo Cicero
Replacements:
HK	16	Carlo Festuccia	(substituted on) 48'
PR	17	Lorenzo Cittadini	(substituted on) 55'
LK	18	Santiago Dellapè	(substituted on) 67'
FL	19	Robert Barbieri	(substituted on) 55'
UB	20	Pablo Canavosio	(substituted on) 60'
FH	21	Riccardo Bocchino	(substituted on) 67'
CE	22	Andrea Masi	(substituted on) 60'
Coach:
Nick Mallett

FB	15	Kurtley Beale
RW	14	Lachie Turner
OC	13	Adam Ashley-Cooper		(substituted off) 79'
IC	12	Berrick Barnes
LW	11	Drew Mitchell
FH	10	Quade Cooper
SH	9	Luke Burgess
N8	8	Ben McCalman
OF	7	David Pocock		(substituted off) 67'
BF	6	Rocky Elsom (c)
RL	5	Nathan Sharpe		(substituted off) 67'
LL	4	Rob Simmons
TP	3	Ben Alexander
HK	2	Stephen Moore	67' to 73'
LP	1	James Slipper		(substituted off) 67'
Replacements:
HK	16	Tatafu Polota-Nau		(substituted on) 67'
PR	17	Benn Robinson		(substituted on) 67'	(substituted off) 73'
LK	18	Mark Chisholm		(substituted on) 67'
FL	19	Matt Hodgson		(substituted on) 67'
SH	20	Will Genia
CE	21	Matt Giteau
WG	22	Pat McCabe		(substituted on) 79'
Coach:
Robbie Deans

Touch judges:
Romain Poite (France)
Tim Hayes (Wales)
Television match official:
Geoff Warren (England)

=== Fifth test ===
27 November 2010
20:45 CET (UTC+01)

France	16–59	Australia
Try: Penalty try 30' c Con: Parra (1/1) 30'; Pen: Parra (3/4) 9', 20', 42'	Report	Try: Asley-Cooper 4' c Robinson 49' c Genia 52' c Mitchell (3) 67' c, 73' c, 76' c O'Connor 80' m Con: O'Connor (6/7) 5', 50', 52', 67', 73', 76'; Pen: O'Connor (4/5) 14', 25', 61', 72'

Stade de France, Saint-Denis
Attendance: 80,000
Referee: Bryce Lawrence (New Zealand)

FB	15	Jérôme Porical
RW	14	Yoann Huget
OC	13	Aurélien Rougerie
IC	12	Yannick Jauzion	(substituted off) 54'
LW	11	Alexis Palisson	(substituted off) 40'
FH	10	Damien Traille
SH	9	Morgan Parra	(substituted off) 72'
N8	8	Sébastien Chabal	(substituted off) 61'
OF	7	Fulgence Ouedraogo
BF	6	Thierry Dusautoir (c)
RL	5	Jérôme Thion	(substituted off) 68'
LL	4	Julien Pierre
TP	3	Nicolas Mas
HK	2	William Servat	(substituted off) 35'
LP	1	Thomas Domingo	(substituted off) 51'
Replacements:
HK	16	Guilhem Guirado	(substituted on) 35'
PR	17	Jérôme Schuster	(substituted on) 51'
LK	18	Romain Millo-Chluski	(substituted on) 68'
FL	19	Julien Bonnaire	(substituted on) 61'
SH	20	Dimitri Yachvili	(substituted on) 72'
CE	21	Fabrice Estebanez	(substituted on) 54'
WG	22	Marc Andreu	(substituted on) 40'
Coach:
Marc Lièvremont

FB	15	Kurtley Beale
RW	14	James O'Connor
OC	13	Adam Ashley-Cooper		(substituted off) 73'
IC	12	Berrick Barnes		(substituted off) 72'
LW	11	Drew Mitchell
FH	10	Quade Cooper
SH	9	Will Genia		(substituted off) 73'
N8	8	Ben McCalman		(substituted off) 36'	(substituted on) 40'	(substituted off) 64'
OF	7	David Pocock
BF	6	Rocky Elsom (c)
RL	5	Nathan Sharpe		(substituted off) 66'
LL	4	Rob Simmons
TP	3	Ben Alexander	(yellow card) 30' to 40'	(substituted off) 40'
HK	2	Stephen Moore		(substituted off) 72'
LP	1	James Slipper
Replacements:
HK	16	Tatafu Polota-Nau		(substituted on) 72'
PR	17	Benn Robinson		(substituted on) 36'
LK	18	Mark Chisholm		(substituted on) 66'
FL	19	Scott Higginbotham		(substituted on) 64'
SH	20	Luke Burgess		(substituted on) 73'
CE	21	Matt Giteau		(substituted on) 72'
WG	22	Lachlan Turner		(substituted on) 73'
Coach:
Robbie Deans

Touch judges:
Wayne Barnes (England)
Carlo Damasco (Italy)
Television match official:
Hugh Watkins (Wales)

== Squad ==
The 40-man squad was announced in early October. The squad was lowered to a 36-man and final squad by mid-October.

Coaching team:

- Head coach: Robbie Deans
- Assistant coach: Jim Williams
- Skills coach: Richard Graham
- High Performance Director: David Nucifora

Note: Flags indicate national union for the club/province as defined by World Rugby.

Player	Position	Date of birth (age)	Caps	Club/province
Huia Edmonds	Hooker	20 October 1981 (aged 29)	3	Brumbies
Saia Fainga'a	Hooker	2 February 1987 (aged 23)	9	Reds
Stephen Moore	Hooker	20 January 1983 (aged 27)	51	Brumbies
Ben Alexander	Prop	13 November 1984 (aged 25)	19	Brumbies
Ben Daley	Prop	27 June 1988 (aged 22)	3	Reds
Salesi Ma'afu	Prop	26 March 1983 (aged 27)	10	Brumbies
Benn Robinson	Prop	19 July 1984 (aged 26)	37	Waratahs
James Slipper	Prop	6 June 1989 (aged 21)	9	Reds
Mark Chisholm	Lock	18 September 1981 (aged 29)	53	Brumbies
Van Humphries	Lock	8 January 1976 (aged 34)	0	Reds
Dean Mumm	Lock	5 March 1984 (aged 26)	30	Waratahs
Nathan Sharpe (vc)	Lock	26 February 1978 (aged 32)	88	Western Force
Rob Simmons	Lock	19 April 1989 (aged 21)	4	Reds
Rocky Elsom	Back row	14 February 1983 (aged 27)	59	Brumbies
Scott Higginbotham	Back row	5 September 1986 (aged 24)	0	Reds
Matt Hodgson	Back row	25 June 1981 (aged 29)	3	Western Force
Pat McCutcheon	Back row	24 June 1987 (aged 23)	0	Waratahs
David Pocock	Back row	23 April 1988 (aged 22)	25	Western Force
Richard Brown	Back row	28 August 1984 (aged 26)	2	Western Force
Ben McCalman	Back row	18 March 1988 (aged 22)	4	Western Force
Luke Burgess	Scrum-half	20 August 1984 (aged 26)	27	Waratahs
Will Genia	Scrum-half	17 January 1988 (aged 22)	18	Reds
Nick Phipps	Scrum-half	9 January 1989 (aged 21)	0	Rebels
Berrick Barnes	Fly-half	28 May 1986 (aged 24)	26	Waratahs
Quade Cooper	Fly-half	5 April 1988 (aged 22)	19	Reds
Adam Ashley-Cooper	Centre	27 March 1984 (aged 26)	46	Brumbies
Anthony Fainga'a	Centre	2 February 1987 (aged 23)	4	Reds
Matt Giteau	Centre	29 September 1982 (aged 28)	87	Brumbies
Rod Davies	Wing	18 May 1989 (aged 21)	0	Reds
Pat McCabe	Wing	21 March 1988 (aged 22)	0	Brumbies
Drew Mitchell	Wing	26 March 1984 (aged 26)	50	Waratahs
Luke Morahan	Wing	13 April 1990 (aged 20)	0	Reds
James O'Connor	Wing	5 July 1990 (aged 20)	23	Western Force
Lachlan Turner	Wing	11 May 1987 (aged 23)	12	Waratahs
Kurtley Beale	Fullback	6 January 1989 (aged 21)	9	Waratahs
Peter Hynes	Fullback	18 July 1982 (aged 28)	22	Reds
