= 2009 Australia rugby union tour =

- Coach: Robbie Deans
- Tour captain: Rocky Elsom
- Top point scorer: Matt Giteau (48)
- Top try scorer: Ryan Cross (4)
- Top test point scorer: Matt Giteau (48)
- Top test try scorer: 10 players with 1 try
Summary
P	W	D	L
Total
7	4	1	2
Test match
5	2	1	2
Opponent
P	W	D	L
New Zealand
1	0	0	1
England
1	1	0	0
Ireland
1	0	1	0
Scotland
1	0	0	1
Wales
1	1	0	0

Tour chronology
- ← 2008 Asia & Europe 2010 Asia & Europe →

The 2009 Australia national rugby union tour was a series of seven matches played by the Australia national rugby union team in November 2009.

Australia did not obtain their goal (the Grand Slam), drawing the match with Ireland, and losing, surprisingly, to Scotland. The tour was preceded by a match against All Blacks for the Bledisloe Cup.

== Matches ==
Scores and results list Australia's points tally first.

Date	Home team	Score	Away team	Venue	Staus
31 October	New Zealand	32-19	Australia	National Olympic Stadium, Tokyo	Bledisloe Cup
2 November	Gloucester (England)	5-36	Australia XV	Kingsholm, Gloucester	Tour Match
7 November	England	9-18	Australia	Twickenham, London	Test Match
15 November	Ireland	20-20	Australia	Croke Park, Dublin	Test Match
21 November	Scotland	9-8	Australia	Murrayfield Stadium, Edinburgh	Test Match
24 November	Cardiff Blues (Wales)	3-31	Australia XV	Cardiff City Stadium, Cardiff	Tour Match
28 November	Wales	12-33	Australia	Millennium Stadium, Cardiff	Test Match

=== New Zealand ===
31 October 2009
17:38 JST (UTC+09)

Australia	19–32	New Zealand
Try: Hynes 34' c Con: Giteau (1/1) 35'; Pen: Giteau (4/5) 5', 11', 28', 71'	Report	Tries: Sivivatu 20' c Smith 45' c Con: Carter (2/2) 21', 46'; Pen: Carter (6/6) 14', 31', 61', 68', 72', 77'

National Olympic Stadium, Tokyo
Attendance: 44,449
Referee: Mark Lawrence (South Africa)

FB	15	James O'Connor
RW	14	Peter Hynes
OC	13	Ryan Cross
IC	12	Adam Ashley-Cooper
LW	11	Digby Ioane
FH	10	Matt Giteau
SH	9	Will Genia
N8	8	Wycliff Palu	(substituted off) 54'
OF	7	David Pocock
BF	6	Rocky Elsom (c)
RL	5	Mark Chisholm	(substituted off) 49'
LL	4	James Horwill
TP	3	Ben Alexander
HK	2	Stephen Moore	(substituted off) 49'
LP	1	Benn Robinson
Replacements:
HK	16	Tatafu Polota-Nau	(substituted on) 49'
PR	17	Matt Dunning
LK	18	Dean Mumm	(substituted on) 49'
N8	19	George Smith	(substituted on) 54'
SH	20	Luke Burgess
FH	21	Drew Mitchell
CE	22	Quade Cooper
Coach:
(New Zealand) Robbie Deans

FB	15	Mils Muliaina
RW	14	Cory Jane
OC	13	Conrad Smith
IC	12	Ma'a Nonu
LW	11	Sitiveni Sivivatu	(yellow card) 32' to 42'
FH	10	Dan Carter		(substituted off) 78'
SH	9	Jimmy Cowan
N8	8	Rodney So'oialo		(substituted off) 53'
OF	7	Richie McCaw (c)
BF	6	Adam Thomson
RL	5	Tom Donnelly		(substituted off) 64'
LL	4	Brad Thorn
TP	3	Neemia Tialata		(substituted off) 46'
HK	2	Andrew Hore
LP	1	Tony Woodcock
Replacements:
HK	16	Corey Flynn
PR	17	John Afoa		(substituted on) 46'
LK	18	Jason Eaton		(substituted on) 64'
N8	19	Kieran Read		(substituted on) 53'
SH	20	Brendon Leonard
FH	21	Stephen Donald		(substituted on) 78'
CE	22	Tamati Ellison
Coach:
(New Zealand) Graham Henry

Assistant referees:
Craig Joubert (South Africa)
Taizo Hirabayashi (Japan)
Television match official:
Akihisa Aso (Japan)

=== Gloucester (un-capped) ===
3 November 2009
19:45 BT/GMT+0 (UTC+0)

Gloucester	5–36	Australia
Try: Burns 25' m Con: Spencer (0/1)	Report	Tries: Cross 14' c T. Smith 30' c Mitchell (2) 65' c, 75' c Cooper 78' m Con: Cooper (4/5) 15', 31', 66', 75'; Pen: Cooper 3'

Kingsholm, Gloucester
Attendance: 16,500
Referee: Andrew Small (England)

FB	15	(England) Freddie Burns	(substituted off) 54'
RW	14	(England) Charlie Sharples
OC	13	(England) Henry Trinder	(substituted off) 72'
IC	12	(New Zealand) Tim Molenaar
LW	11	(England) Tom Voyce
FH	10	(New Zealand) Carlos Spencer
SH	9	(England) Dave Lewis	(substituted off) 61'
N8	8	(England) Dan Williams	(substituted off) 61'
OF	7	(Fiji) Akapusi Qera
BF	6	(South Africa) Jake Boer (c)
RL	5	(England) Adam Eustace	(substituted off) 40'
LL	4	(Wales) Will James
TP	3	(France) Pierre Capdevielle
HK	2	(England) Darren Dawidiuk	(substituted off) 71'
LP	1	(England) Paul Doran-Jones	(substituted off) 67'
Substitutions:
HK	16	(Wales) Ben Phillips	(substituted on) 71'
PR	17	(England) Rupert Harden	(substituted on) 67'
LK	18	(England) Dave Attwood	(substituted on) 40'
FL	19	(Fiji) Apolosi Satala	(substituted on) 61'
SH	20	(England) Jordi Pasqualin	(substituted on) 61'
CE	21	(England) Jonny May	(substituted on) 72'
WG	22	(England) James Simpson-Daniel	(substituted on) 54'
Coach:
(Scotland) Bryan Redpath

FB	15	Kurtley Beale
RW	14	Lachlan Turner
OC	13	Ryan Cross
IC	12	Tyrone Smith
LW	11	Drew Mitchell
FH	10	Quade Cooper
SH	9	Luke Burgess
N8	8	Richard Brown
OF	7	Matt Hodgson
BF	6	Mitchell Chapman
RL	5	Dave Dennis
LL	4	Dean Mumm (c)
TP	3	Salesi Ma'afu	(substituted off) 51'
HK	2	Tatafu Polota-Nau	(substituted off) 37'
LP	1	Sekope Kepu
Substitutions:
HK	16	Pekahou Cowan	(substituted on) 37'
PR	17	Matt Dunning	(substituted on) 51'
LK	18	Mark Chisholm
N8	19	Wycliff Palu
SH	20	Richard Kingi
FH	21	Matt To'omua
FB	22	James O'Connor
Coach:
(New Zealand) Robbie Deans

=== England ===
7 November 2009
14:30 BT/GMT+0 (UTC+0)

England	9–18	Australia
Pen: Wilkinson (2/3) 8', 25'; Drop: Wilkinson (1/2) 3'	Report	Try: Genia 21' m Ashley-Cooper 72' c Con: Giteau (1/2) 73'; Pen: Giteau (2/2) 45', 60'

Twickenham, London
Attendance: 80,020
Referee: Bryce Lawrence (New Zealand)

FB	15	Ugo Monye
RW	14	Mark Cueto
OC	13	Dan Hipkiss	(substituted off) 66'
IC	12	Shane Geraghty
LW	11	Matt Banahan
FH	10	Jonny Wilkinson
SH	9	Danny Care	(substituted off) 64'
N8	8	Jordan Crane	(substituted off) 53'
OF	7	Lewis Moody
BF	6	Tom Croft
RL	5	Steve Borthwick (c)
LL	4	Louis Deacon	(substituted off) 68'
TP	3	David Wilson	(substituted off) 57'
HK	2	Steve Thompson	(substituted off) 56'
LP	1	Tim Payne
Replacements:
HK	16	Dylan Hartley	(substituted on) 56'
PR	17	Duncan Bell	(substituted on) 57'
LK	18	Courtney Lawes
N8	19	James Haskell	(substituted on) 53'
SH	20	Paul Hodgson	(substituted on) 64'
FH	21	Andy Goode
CE	22	Ayoola Erinle	(substituted on) 66'
Coach:
(England) Martin Johnson

FB	15	Adam Ashley-Cooper
RW	14	Peter Hynes
OC	13	Digby Ioane	(substituted off) 75'
IC	12	Quade Cooper
LW	11	Drew Mitchell
FH	10	Matt Giteau
SH	9	Will Genia
N8	8	Wycliff Palu	(substituted off) 69'
OF	7	George Smith
BF	6	Rocky Elsom (c)
RL	5	Mark Chisholm	(substituted off) 74'
LL	4	James Horwill
TP	3	Ben Alexander	(substituted off) 78'
HK	2	Stephen Moore	(substituted off) 60'
LP	1	Benn Robinson
Replacements:
HK	16	Tatafu Polota-Nau	(substituted on) 60'
PR	17	Matt Dunning	(substituted on) 78'
LK	18	Dean Mumm	(substituted on) 74'
FL	19	David Pocock	(substituted on) 69'
SH	20	Luke Burgess
CE	21	Ryan Cross	(substituted on) 75'
FB	22	James O'Connor
Coach:
(New Zealand) Robbie Deans

=== Ireland ===
15 November 2009
15:00 IST/GMT+0 (UTC+0)

Ireland	20–20	Australia
Tries: Bowe 57' c O'Driscoll 79' c Con: O'Gara (2/2) 58', 79'; Pen: O'Gara (2/2) 5', 21'	Report	Tries: Mitchell 2' c Elsom 62' c Con: Giteau (2/2) 3', 62'; Pen: Giteau (2/4) 24', 54'; Drop: Giteau (0/1)

Croke Park, Dublin
Attendance: 69,886
Referee: Jonathan Kaplan (South Africa)

FB	15	Rob Kearney
RW	14	Tommy Bowe
OC	13	Brian O'Driscoll (c)
IC	12	Paddy Wallace
LW	11	Luke Fitzgerald	(substituted off) 53'
FH	10	Ronan O'Gara
SH	9	Tomás O'Leary
N8	8	Jamie Heaslip
OF	7	David Wallace	63' to 65'
BF	6	Stephen Ferris			(substituted off) 75'
RL	5	Paul O'Connell
LL	4	Donncha O'Callaghan
TP	3	John Hayes
HK	2	Jerry Flannery
LP	1	Cian Healy
Replacements:
HK	16	Seán Cronin
PR	17	Tom Court
LK	18	Leo Cullen
FL	19	Denis Leamy	(substituted on) 63'	(substituted off) 65'	(substituted on) 75'
SH	20	Eoin Reddan
FH	21	Johnny Sexton
WG	22	Keith Earls	(substituted on) 53'
Coach:
(Ireland) Declan Kidney

FB	15	Adam Ashley-Cooper	(substituted off) 69'
RW	14	Peter Hynes
OC	13	Digby Ioane
IC	12	Quade Cooper
LW	11	Drew Mitchell
FH	10	Matt Giteau
SH	9	Will Genia
N8	8	Wycliff Palu	(yellow card) 29' to 39'
OF	7	David Pocock	20' to 28'
BF	6	Rocky Elsom (c)
RL	5	Mark Chisholm
LL	4	James Horwill
TP	3	Ben Alexander
HK	2	Stephen Moore	(substituted off) 64'
LP	1	Benn Robinson
Replacements:
HK	16	Tatafu Polota-Nau	(substituted on) 64'
PR	17	Matt Dunning
LK	18	Dean Mumm
FL	19	George Smith	(substituted on) 20'	(substituted off) 28'
SH	20	Luke Burgess
FH	21	Ryan Cross
FB	22	James O'Connor	(substituted on) 69'
Coach:
(New Zealand) Robbie Deans

- Ireland captain Brian O'Driscoll became the 11th player in history to make his 100th Test appearance.

=== Scotland ===
21 November 2009
17:15 BT/GMT+0 (UTC+0)

Scotland	9–8	Australia
Pen: Godman (2/3) 27', 56'; Drop: Godman (0/1); Paterson (1/1) 75'	Report	Try: Cross 80' m Con: Giteau (0/1); Pen: Giteau (1/3) 4'; Drop: Giteau (0/1)

Murrayfield, Edinburgh
Attendance: 44,762
Referee: Romain Poite (France)

FB	15	Rory Lamont
RW	14	Sean Lamont
OC	13	Alex Grove
IC	12	Graeme Morrison	(substituted off) 40'
LW	11	Simon Danielli	(substituted off) 63'
FH	10	Phil Godman
SH	9	Chris Cusiter (c)	(substituted off) 20'
N8	8	Johnnie Beattie	(substituted off) 63'
OF	7	John Barclay
BF	6	Alasdair Strokosch	(substituted off) 47'
RL	5	Alastair Kellock
LL	4	Nathan Hines
TP	3	Moray Low	(substituted off) 57'
HK	2	Ross Ford	(substituted off) 76'
LP	1	Allan Jacobsen
Replacements:
HK	16	Dougie Hall	(substituted on) 76'
PR	17	Kyle Traynor	(substituted on) 57'
FL	18	Jason White	(substituted on) 47'
N8	19	Richie Vernon	(substituted on) 63'
SH	20	Rory Lawson	(substituted on) 20'
FB	21	Chris Paterson	(substituted on) 63'
CE	22	Nick De Luca	(substituted on) 40'
Coach:
(England) Andy Robinson

FB	15	Adam Ashley-Cooper
RW	14	Peter Hynes
OC	13	Ryan Cross
IC	12	Quade Cooper	(substituted off) 73'
LW	11	Drew Mitchell
FH	10	Matt Giteau
SH	9	Will Genia	(substituted off) 63'
N8	8	Wycliff Palu	(substituted off) 66'
OF	7	George Smith
BF	6	Rocky Elsom (c)
RL	5	Mark Chisholm	(substituted off) 49'
LL	4	James Horwill
TP	3	Ben Alexander
HK	2	Stephen Moore	(substituted off) 45'
LP	1	Benn Robinson	(substituted off) 16'
Replacements:
HK	16	Tatafu Polota-Nau	(substituted on) 45'
PR	17	Sekope Kepu	(substituted on) 16'
LK	18	Dean Mumm	(substituted on) 49'
N8	19	Richard Brown	(substituted on) 66'
SH	20	Luke Burgess	(substituted on) 63'
WG	21	Lachie Turner
CE	22	James O'Connor	(substituted on) 73'
Coach:
(New Zealand) Robbie Deans

=== Cardiff Blues (un-capped) ===
24 November 2009
19:35 BT/GMT+0 (UTC+0)

Cardiff Blues	3–31	Australia
Pen: Blair (1/1) 3'	Report	Try: Cross 4' c Beale (2) 38' c, 80' c Morahan 76' c Con: O'Connor (4/4) 6', 40', 77', 80'; Pen: O'Connor (1/1) 21'

Cardiff City Stadium, Cardiff
Attendance: 14,622
Referee: James Jones (Wales)

FB	15	(New Zealand) Ben Blair	(substituted off) 63'
RW	14	(Wales) Richard Mustoe
OC	13	(Wales) Gareth Thomas	2' to 9'
IC	12	(Wales) Dafydd Hewitt
LW	11	(Wales) Chris Czekaj
FH	10	(Australia) Sam Norton-Knight
SH	9	(Wales) Gareth Cooper	(substituted off) 40'
N8	8	(New Zealand) Xavier Rush (c)
OF	7	(Australia) Ben White	(substituted off) 40'
BF	6	(Wales) Sam Warburton
RL	5	(Wales) Scott Morgan	(substituted off) 40'
LL	4	(Wales) Deiniol Jones
TP	3	(Wales) Gary Powell	45' to 63'
HK	2	(Wales) T. Rhys Thomas	(substituted off) 71'
LP	1	(Tonga) Taufaʻao Filise		(substituted off) 63'
Substitutions:
HK	16	(Wales) Rhys Williams	(substituted on) 71'
PR	17	(Wales) Sam Hobbs	(substituted on) 45'
LK	18	(New Zealand) Paul Tito	(substituted on) 40'
FL	19	(Wales) Robin Sowden-Taylor	(substituted on) 40'
SH	20	(Wales) Richie Rees	(substituted on) 40'
FH	21	(Wales) Ceri Sweeney	(substituted on) 63'
CE	22	(Wales) Gavin Evans	(substituted on) 2'	(substituted off) 9'
Coach:
(Wales) Dai Young

FB	15	James O'Connor
RW	14	Lachlan Turner
OC	13	Ryan Cross		(substituted off) 62'
IC	12	Tyrone Smith
LW	11	Kurtley Beale
FH	10	Matt To'omua		(substituted off) 2'
SH	9	Luke Burgess		(substituted off) 74'
N8	8	Richard Brown	(yellow card) 47' to 57'
OF	7	Matt Hodgson	(yellow card) 68' to 78'
BF	6	Mitchell Chapman		(substituted off) 31'
RL	5	Dean Mumm (c)
LL	4	Dave Dennis
TP	3	Sekope Kepu		(substituted off) 60'
HK	2	Tatafu Polota-Nau			(substituted off) 63'
LP	1	Pekahou Cowan		(substituted off) 29'	(substituted on) 63'
Substitutions:
PR	16	Salesi Ma'afu		(substituted on) 29'
PR	17	Matt Dunning		(substituted on) 60'
LK	18	Mark Chisholm
FL	19	George Smith		(substituted on) 31'
SH	20	Richard Kingi		(substituted on) 74'
FH	21	Quade Cooper		(substituted on) 2'
WG	22	Luke Morahan		(substituted on) 62'
Coach:
(New Zealand) Robbie Deans

=== Wales ===
28 November 2009
17:15 BT/GMT+0 (UTC+0)

Wales	12–33	Australia
Pen: S. Jones (3/4) 21' 30' 40'; Halfpenny (1/1) 17'; Hook (0/1)	Report	Try: Ioane 7' m Horwill 19' m Pocock 24' c Polota-Nau 62' c Con: Giteau (2/4) 25', 63'; Pen: Giteau (3/3) 2' 31' 57'

Millennium Stadium, Cardiff
Referee: Wayne Barnes (England)

FB	15	James Hook
RW	14	Leigh Halfpenny	(substituted off) 28'
OC	13	Jamie Roberts
IC	12	Jonathan Davies
LW	11	Shane Williams	(substituted off) 5'
FH	10	Stephen Jones
SH	9	Dwayne Peel	10' to 15'		(substituted off) 72'
N8	8	Andy Powell		60' to 65'
OF	7	Martyn Williams
BF	6	Dan Lydiate	(substituted off) 48'	(substituted on) 60'	(substituted off) 65'
RL	5	Luke Charteris	(substituted off) 49'
LL	4	Alun Wyn Jones
TP	3	Paul James	(substituted off) 48'
HK	2	Matthew Rees	(substituted off) 30'
LP	1	Gethin Jenkins (c)
Replacements:
HK	16	Huw Bennett	(substituted on) 30'
PR	17	Duncan Jones	(substituted on) 48'
LK	18	Jonathan Thomas	(substituted on) 49'
FL	19	Sam Warburton	(substituted on) 48'
SH	20	Martin Roberts	(substituted on) 10'	(substituted off) 15'	(substituted on) 72'
WG	21	Andrew Bishop	(substituted on) 28'
WG	22	Tom James	(substituted on) 5'
Coach:
(New Zealand) Warren Gatland

FB	15	Adam Ashley-Cooper
RW	14	Peter Hynes	(substituted off) 64'
OC	13	Digby Ioane
IC	12	Quade Cooper
LW	11	Drew Mitchell	(substituted off) 70'
FH	10	Matt Giteau
SH	9	Will Genia	(substituted off) 79'
N8	8	Wycliff Palu	(substituted off) 70'
OF	7	David Pocock	(substituted off) 40'
BF	6	Rocky Elsom (c)
RL	5	Dean Mumm
LL	4	James Horwill
TP	3	Ben Alexander	(substituted off) 73'
HK	2	Stephen Moore	(substituted off) 55'
LP	1	Benn Robinson
Replacements:
HK	16	Tatafu Polota-Nau	(substituted on) 55'
PR	17	Matt Dunning	(substituted on) 73'
N8	18	Mark Chisholm	(substituted on) 70'
FL	19	George Smith	(substituted on) 40'
SH	20	Luke Burgess	(substituted on) 79'
WG	21	James O'Connor	(substituted on) 64'
WG	22	Kurtley Beale	(substituted on) 70'
Coach:
(New Zealand) Robbie Deans

== Squad ==
The 35-man touring party was announced on 8 October 2009.

On 28 October, Tyrone Smith was called up to replace the injured Rob Horne.

After Berrick Barnes was ruled out with an injury sustained in training Brumbies, fly-half Matt To'omua was called up to cover for him.

Note: Caps and date of ages are to opening tour match on 31 October 2009.

Note: Flags indicate national union for the club/province as defined by World Rugby.

Player	Position	Date of birth (age)	Caps	Club/province
Stephen Moore	Hooker	20 January 1983 (aged 26)	41	(Australia) Brumbies
Tatafu Polota-Nau	Hooker	26 July 1985 (aged 24)	18	(Australia) Waratahs
Ben Alexander	Prop	13 November 1984 (aged 24)	13	(Australia) Brumbies
Pekahau Cowan	Prop	2 June 1986 (aged 23)	3	(Australia) Western Force
Matt Dunning	Prop	19 December 1978 (aged 30)	32	(Australia) Waratahs
Sekope Kepu	Prop	5 February 1986 (aged 23)	2	(Australia) Waratahs
Salesi Ma'afu	Prop	22 March 1983 (aged 26)	0	(Australia) Brumbies
Benn Robinson	Prop	19 July 1984 (aged 25)	26	(Australia) Waratahs
Mark Chisholm	Lock	18 September 1981 (aged 28)	43	(Australia) Brumbies
Dave Dennis	Lock	10 January 1986 (aged 23)	0	(Australia) Waratahs
James Horwill	Lock	29 May 1985 (aged 24)	19	(Australia) Reds
Dean Mumm	Lock	5 March 1984 (aged 25)	16	(Australia) Waratahs
Mitchell Chapman	Flanker	15 March 1983 (aged 26)	0	(Australia) Brumbies
Rocky Elsom (c)	Flanker	14 February 1983 (aged 26)	44	(Australia) Brumbies
Matt Hodgson	Flanker	25 June 1981 (aged 28)	0	(Australia) Western Force
David Pocock	Flanker	23 April 1988 (aged 21)	11	(Australia) Western Force
George Smith	Flanker	14 July 1980 (aged 29)	105	(Australia) Brumbies
Richard Brown	Number 8	28 August 1984 (aged 25)	11	(Australia) Western Force
Wycliff Palu	Number 8	27 July 1982 (aged 27)	28	(Australia) Waratahs
Luke Burgess	Scrum-half	20 August 1983 (aged 26)	19	(Australia) Waratahs
Will Genia	Scrum-half	17 January 1988 (aged 21)	6	(Australia) Reds
Richard Kingi	Scrum-half	17 March 1989 (aged 20)	0	(Australia) Reds
Quade Cooper	Fly-half	5 April 1988 (aged 21)	7	(Australia) Reds
Matt Giteau	Fly-half	29 September 1982 (aged 27)	73	(Australia) Western Force
Matt To'omua	Fly-half	2 January 1990 (aged 19)	0	(Australia) Brumbies
Berrick Barnes (vc)	Centre	28 May 1986 (aged 23)	21	(Australia) Reds
Ryan Cross	Centre	17 July 1979 (aged 30)	17	(Australia) Western Force
Rob Horne	Centre	15 August 1989 (aged 20)	0	(Australia) Waratahs
Stirling Mortlock	Centre	20 May 1977 (aged 32)	80	(Australia) Brumbies
Tyrone Smith	Centre	12 July 1983 (aged 26)	0	(Australia) Brumbies
Peter Hynes	Wing	18 July 1982 (aged 27)	17	(Australia) Reds
Digby Ioane	Wing	14 July 1985 (aged 24)	1	(Australia) Reds
Drew Mitchell	Wing	26 March 1984 (aged 25)	37	(Australia) Western Force
Luke Morahan	Wing	13 April 1990 (aged 19)	0	(Australia) Reds
Lachlan Turner	Wing	11 May 1987 (aged 22)	11	(Australia) Waratahs
Kurtley Beale	Fullback	6 January 1989 (aged 20)	0	(Australia) Waratahs
Adam Ashley-Cooper	Fullback	27 March 1984 (aged 25)	32	(Australia) Brumbies
James O'Connor	Fullback	5 July 1990 (aged 19)	10	(Australia) Western Force

=== Coaching staff ===
Head Coach - (New Zealand) Robbie Deans
Assistant Coach - (Australia) Jim Williams
Skills Coach - (Australia) Richard Graham
High Performance Director - (Australia) David Nucifora

=== Statistics ===
Key

- Con: Conversions
- Pen: Penalties
- DG: Drop goals
- Pts: Points

Name	Non-Test						Test						Overall						Cards	
Name	Played	Tries	Con	Pen	DG	Pts	Played	Tries	Con	Pen	DG	Pts	Played	Tries	Con	Pen	DG	Pts	Temporarily suspended	Red card
Matt Giteau	–	–	–	–	–	–	5	0	6	12	0	48	5	0	6	12	0	48	–	–
Ryan Cross	2	3	0	0	0	15	3	1	0	0	0	5	6	1	4	1	0	16	–	–
Quade Cooper	2	1	4	1	0	16	4	0	0	0	0	0	5	1	6	2	0	16	–	–
James O'Connor	1	0	4	1	0	11	4	0	0	0	0	0	5	0	4	1	0	11	–	–
Drew Mitchell	2	1	0	0	0	5	4	1	0	0	0	5	6	2	0	0	0	10	–	–
Kurtley Beale	2	2	0	0	0	10	1	0	0	0	0	0	3	2	0	0	0	10	–	–
Tatafu Polota-Nau	2	0	0	0	0	0	5	1	0	0	0	5	7	1	0	0	0	5	–	–
Adam Ashley-Cooper	–	–	–	–	–	–	5	1	0	0	0	5	5	1	0	0	0	5	–	–
Rocky Elsom	–	–	–	–	–	–	5	1	0	0	0	5	5	1	0	0	0	5	–	–
Will Genia	–	–	–	–	–	–	5	1	0	0	0	5	5	1	0	0	0	5	–	–
James Horwill	–	–	–	–	–	–	5	1	0	0	0	5	5	1	0	0	0	5	–	–
Peter Hynes	–	–	–	–	–	–	5	1	0	0	0	5	5	1	0	0	0	5	–	–
Digby Ioane	–	–	–	–	–	–	4	1	0	0	0	5	4	1	0	0	0	5	–	–
David Pocock	–	–	–	–	–	–	4	1	0	0	0	5	4	1	0	0	0	5	–	–
Tyrone Smith	2	1	0	0	0	5	–	–	–	–	–	–	2	1	0	0	0	5	–	–
Luke Morahan	1	1	0	0	0	5	–	–	–	–	–	–	1	1	0	0	0	5	–	–
Dean Mumm	2	0	0	0	0	0	4	0	0	0	0	0	6	0	0	0	0	0	–	–
George Smith	1	0	0	0	0	0	5	0	0	0	0	0	6	0	0	0	0	0	–	–
Ben Alexander	–	–	–	–	–	–	5	0	0	0	0	0	5	0	0	0	0	0	–	–
Mark Chisholm	–	–	–	–	–	–	5	0	0	0	0	0	5	0	0	0	0	0	–	–
Stephen Moore	–	–	–	–	–	–	5	0	0	0	0	0	5	0	0	0	0	0	–	–
Wycliff Palu	–	–	–	–	–	–	5	0	0	0	0	0	5	0	0	0	0	0	1	–
Benn Robinson	–	–	–	–	–	–	5	0	0	0	0	0	5	0	0	0	0	0	–	–
Luke Burgess	2	0	0	0	0	0	2	0	0	0	0	0	4	0	0	0	0	0	–	–
Matt Dunning	2	0	0	0	0	0	2	0	0	0	0	0	4	0	0	0	0	0	–	–
Richard Brown	2	0	0	0	0	0	1	0	0	0	0	0	3	0	0	0	0	0	1	–
Sekope Kepu	2	0	0	0	0	0	1	0	0	0	0	0	3	0	0	0	0	0	–	–
Mitchell Chapman	2	0	0	0	0	0	–	–	–	–	–	–	2	0	0	0	0	0	–	–
Pekahau Cowan	2	0	0	0	0	0	–	–	–	–	–	–	2	0	0	0	0	0	–	–
Dave Dennis	2	0	0	0	0	0	–	–	–	–	–	–	2	0	0	0	0	0	–	–
Matt Hodgson	2	0	0	0	0	0	–	–	–	–	–	–	2	0	0	0	0	0	1	–
Salesi Ma'afu	2	0	0	0	0	0	–	–	–	–	–	–	2	0	0	0	0	0	–	–
Richard Kingi	1	0	0	0	0	0	–	–	–	–	–	–	1	0	0	0	0	0	–	–
Matt To'omua	1	0	0	0	0	0	–	–	–	–	–	–	1	0	0	0	0	0	–	–
Lachlan Turner	1	0	0	0	0	0	–	–	–	–	–	–	1	0	0	0	0	0	–	–
Berrick Barnes	did not play																			
Rob Horne	did not play																			
Stirling Mortlock	did not play																			
