= 2008 Australia rugby union tour =

- Coach: Robbie Deans
- Tour captain: Stirling Mortlock
Summary
| P | W | D | L |
Total
| 6 | 4 | 0 | 2 |
Test match
| 5 | 3 | 0 | 2 |
Opponent
| P | W | D | L |
New Zealand
| 1 | 0 | 0 | 1 |
Italy
| 1 | 1 | 0 | 0 |
England
| 1 | 1 | 0 | 0 |
France
| 1 | 1 | 0 | 0 |
Wales
| 1 | 0 | 0 | 1 |

Tour chronology
- ← 2006 2009 →

The 2008 Australia rugby union tour was a series of seven matches played by the Australia national rugby union team in November–December 2008. The tour was preceded by a match against All Blacks for the Bledisloe Cup and closed with a match against Barbarian FC.

== Matches ==
| Date | Home team | Score | Away team | Venue | Status |
|---|---|---|---|---|---|
| 1 November | New Zealand | 19-14 | Australia | Hong Kong Stadium, So Kon Po, Hong Kong | Test match, Bledisloe Cup |
| 8 November | Italy | 20-30 | Australia | Stadio Euganeo, Padua | Test match |
| 15 November | England | 14-28 | Australia | Twickenham Stadium, London | Test match, Cook Cup |
| 22 November | France | 13-18 | Australia | Stade de France, Saint-Denis, Paris | Test match, Trophée des Bicentenaires |
| 29 November | Wales | 21-18 | Australia | Millennium Stadium, Cardiff | Test match, James Bevan Trophy |
| 3 December | Barbarian F.C. | 11-18 | Australia XV | Wembley Stadium, London | The Final Challenge, Olympic Rugby Centenary Celebration Match, Cornwall Cup |

=== Bledisloe Cup match ===
A first match was played in Hong Kong against New Zealand. It was the fourth match between the two teams. Winning the match, the All Blacks tied the series (2–2) and retained the Bledisloe Cup.

1 November 2008

| New Zealand | 19–14 | Australia |
| Try: Sivivatu 41'; McCaw 82'; Pen: Carter 12', 23', 31' | report | Try: Mitchell 8'; Mitchell 25'; Con: Giteau 8', 25' |

So Kon Po, Hong Kong
Attendance: 40,000
Referee: Alan Lewis (Ireland)

| New Zealand | | | Australia |
| (substituted off) Isaia Toeava | FB | 15 | FB | Adam Ashley-Cooper |
| Hosea Gear | W | 14 | W | Peter Hynes |
| Conrad Smith | C | 13 | C | Ryan Cross (substituted off) |
| Dan Carter | C | 12 | C | Stirling Mortlock (capt.) |
| Sitiveni Sivivatu | W | 11 | W | Drew Mitchell |
| (substituted off) Stephen Donald | FH | 10 | FH | Matt Giteau |
| (substituted off) Jimmy Cowan | SH | 9 | SH | Luke Burgess |
| Rodney So'oialo | N8 | 8 | N8 | Richard Brown |
| (capt.) Richie McCaw | F | 7 | F | George Smith (substituted off) |
| (substituted off) Jerome Kaino | F | 6 | F | Dean Mumm |
| Ali Williams | L | 5 | L | Nathan Sharpe (substituted off) |
| (substituted off) Brad Thorn | L | 4 | L | Mark Chisholm |
| (substituted off) Neemia Tialata | P | 3 | P | Al Baxter (substituted off) |
| (substituted off) Andrew Hore | H | 2 | H | Stephen Moore |
| Tony Woodcock | P | 1 | P | Benn Robinson |
| | | Replacements |
| (substituted on) Keven Mealamu | H | 16 | | Tatafu Polota-Nau |
| (substituted on) Greg Somerville | P | 17 | P | Matt Dunning (substituted on) |
| (substituted on) Anthony Boric | L | 18 | L | Phil Waugh (substituted on) |
| (substituted on) Adam Thomson | N8 | 19 | F | David Pocock (substituted on) |
| (substituted on) Piri Weepu | SH | 20 | | Sam Cordingley |
| (substituted on) Ma'a Nonu | FH | 21 | C | Berrick Barnes (substituted on) |
| (substituted on) Cory Jane | FB | 22 | | Lachie Turner |
| | | Coaches |
| (New Zealand) Graham Henry | | | | Robbie Deans (New Zealand) |

=== In Italy ===
Against Italy, the Wallabies suffered the strong play of Italian forwards and the strong defence of "azzurri", winning the match also in the last 20 minutes, thanks to a try from Quade Cooper.

8 November 2008

| Italy | 20–30 | Australia |
| Try: Mi. Bergamasco 29'; Pen: Marcato 6' 11' Orquera 52' 59' | report | Try: Turner 7' Cooper 71'; Con: Giteau 72'; Pen: Mortlock 2' Giteau 17' 38' 47' 50' 78' |

Stadio Euganeo, Padua
Attendance: 30,000
Referee: Bryce Lawrence (New Zealand)

| Italy | | | Australia |
| Andrea Masi | FB | 15 | FB | Adam Ashley-Cooper |
| Kaine Robertson | W | 14 | W | Lachie Turner |
| Gonzalo Canale | C | 13 | C | Stirling Mortlock (capt.) |
| Gonzalo Garcia | C | 12 | C | Timana Tahu (substituted off) 62' |
| Mirco Bergamasco | W | 11 | W | Digby Ioane |
| (substituted off) 45' Andrea Marcato | FH | 10 | FH | Berrick Barnes (substituted off) 13' |
| (substituted off) 61' Pablo Canavosio | SH | 9 | SH | Luke Burgess |
| (capt.) Sergio Parisse | N8 | 8 | N8 | Richard Brown |
| Mauro Bergamasco | F | 7 | F | Phil Waugh |
| (substituted off) 73' Josh Sole | F | 6 | F | Dean Mumm |
| Marco Bortolami | L | 5 | L | Hugh McMeniman (substituted off) 73' |
| Carlo Del Fava | L | 4 | L | Mark Chisholm |
| Carlos Nieto | P | 3 | P | Matt Dunning |
| (substituted off) 50' Leonardo Ghiraldini | H | 2 | H | Stephen Moore |
| (substituted off) 50' Salvatore Perugini | P | 1 | P | Ben Alexander (substituted off) 73' |
| | | Replacements |
| (substituted on) 50' Fabio Ongaro | H | 16 | | Tatafu Polota-Nau |
| (substituted on) 50' Matías Agüero | P | 17 | P | Sekope Kepu (substituted on) 43' |
| Tommaso Reato | | 18 | L | Wycliff Palu (substituted on) 73' |
| (substituted on) 73' Alessandro Zanni | F | 19 | | David Pocock |
| (substituted on) 61' Giulio Toniolatti | SH | 20 | FH | Matt Giteau (substituted on) 13' |
| (substituted on) 45' Luciano Orquera | FH | 21 | C | Quade Cooper (substituted on) 62' |
| Matteo Pratichetti | | 22 | | James O'Connor |
| | | Coaches |
| (South Africa) Nick Mallett | | | | Robbie Deans (New Zealand) |

=== Against England ===
England offered a strong opposition in the first half, especially between the 35th and 39th minutes, and scored a try with Nick Easter and a penalty with Danny Cipriani, but the Aussies were always ahead thanks to the kicks of Giteau and Martlock, until a try of Adam Ashley-Cooper closed the match.

15 November 2008

| England | 14–28 | Australia |
| Try: Easter 35'; Pen: Cipriani 39' 50'; Drop: Armitage 21' | report | Try: Aslhey-Cooper 68'; Con: Giteau 69'; Pen: Giteau 2' 6' 27' 31' 53' 58'; Mortlock 64' |

Twickenham, London
Attendance: 81,000
Referee: Marius Jonker (South Africa)

| England | | | Australia |
| Delon Armitage | FB | 15 | FB | Adam Ashley-Cooper |
| Paul Sackey | W | 14 | W | Peter Hynes |
| Jamie Noon | C | 13 | C | Ryan Cross |
| Riki Flutey | C | 12 | C | Stirling Mortlock (capt.) |
| Ugo Monye | W | 11 | W | Drew Mitchell |
| (substituted off) 71' Danny Cipriani | FH | 10 | FH | Matt Giteau |
| (substituted off) 66' Danny Care | SH | 9 | SH | Luke Burgess |
| (substituted off) 59' Nick Easter | N8 | 8 | N8 | Richard Brown (substituted off) 45' |
| (substituted off) 64' Tom Rees | F | 7 | F | George Smith |
| Tom Croft | F | 6 | F | Hugh McMeniman (substituted off) 80' |
| (substituted off) 64' Tom Palmer | L | 5 | L | Nathan Sharpe |
| (capt.) Steve Borthwick | L | 4 | L | Mark Chisholm (substituted off) 65' |
| (substituted off) 54' (substituted on) 66' Phil Vickery | P | 3 | P | Al Baxter |
| (substituted off) 70' Lee Mears | H | 2 | H | Stephen Moore |
| 34' to 42' 66' (substituted off) Andrew Sheridan | P | 1 | P | Benn Robinson |
| | | Replacements |
| (substituted on) 70' Dylan Hartley | H | 16 | F | Tatafu Polota-Nau (substituted on) 80' |
| (substituted on) (substituted off) 32–42' (substituted on) 54' Matt Stevens | P | 17 | | Matt Dunning |
| (substituted on) 64' Simon Shaw | L | 18 | L | Dean Mumm (substituted on) 65' |
| (substituted on) 59' James Haskell | N8 | 19 | N8 | Wycliff Palu (substituted on) 45' |
| (substituted on) 64' Michael Lipman | F | 20 | | Sam Cordingley |
| (substituted on) 66' Harry Ellis | SH | 21 | | Quade Cooper |
| (substituted on) 71' Toby Flood | FH | 22 | | Digby Ioane |
| | | Coaches |
| (England) Brian Ashton | | | | Robbie Deans (New Zealand) |

=== Against France ===
As in the two previous matches, Wallabies obtained victory thanks to a better second half. The try of Peter Hynes and a kick after France reached the 13–13 in the beginning of the second Half. On French Sie, Skrela missed five kicks.

22 November 2008

| France | 13–18 | Australia |
| Try: Penalty try 39'; Con: Skrela 40'; Pen: Skrela 48'; Drop: Medard 51' | report | Try: Moore 31' Hynes 57'; Con: Giteau 32'; Pen: Giteau 28' 74' |

Stade de France, Saint-Dennis
Attendance: 70,000
Referee: Craig Joubert (South Africa)

| France | | | Australia |
| Maxime Medard | FB | 15 | FB | Drew Mitchell |
| Julien Malzieu | W | 14 | W | Peter Hynes |
| (substituted off) 78' Yannick Jauzion | C | 13 | C | Adam Ashley-Cooper (substituted on) 75' |
| (substituted off) 35' Benoit Baby | C | 12 | C | Stirling Mortlock (capt.) |
| Cédric Heymans | W | 11 | W | Digby Ioane |
| (yellow card) 75' to 80' David Skrela | FH | 10 | FH | Matt Giteau |
| (substituted off) 77' Sebastien Tillous-Borde | SH | 9 | SH | Luke Burgess (substituted off) 64' |
| Imanol Harinordoquy | N8 | 8 | N8 | Wycliff Palu (substituted off) 59' |
| Fulgence Ouedraogo | F | 7 | F | George Smith |
| (substituted off) 69' Thierry Dusautoir | F | 6 | F | Dean Mumm |
| (substituted off) 42' (capt.) Lionel Nallet | L | 5 | L | Nathan Sharpe |
| Sébastien Chabal | L | 4 | L | Hugh McMeniman |
| (substituted off) 58' Nicolas Mas | P | 3 | P | Al Baxter |
| (substituted off) 56' Dimitri Szarzewski | H | 2 | H | Stephen Moore |
| Lionel Faure | P | 1 | P | Ben Alexander (substituted off) 64' |
| | | Replacements |
| (substituted on) 58' Benoit Lecouls | P | 16 | | Tatafu Polota-Nau |
| (substituted on) 56' Benjamin Kayser | H | 17 | P | Sekope Kepu (substituted on) 64' |
| (substituted on) 42' Romain Millo-Chluski | L | 18 | N8 | Mark Chisholm (substituted on) 59' |
| (substituted on) 69' Louis Picamoles | F | 19 | | David Pocock |
| (substituted on) 77' Julien Tomas | SH | 20 | SH | Sam Cordingley (substituted on) 64' |
| (substituted on) 35' Damien Traille | C | 21 | C | Quade Cooper (substituted on) 75' |
| (substituted on) 78' Alexis Palisson | W | 22 | | Lote Tuqiri |
| | | Coaches |
| (France) Marc Lièvremont | | | | Robbie Deans (New Zealand) |

=== Against Wales ===
29 November 2008

| Wales | 21–18 | Australia |
| Try: S. Williams 3', Byrne 30'; Con: S. Jones 31; Pen: S. Jones 28', 78'; Drop: S. Jones 67' | report | Try: Chisolm 13', Ioane 80'; Con: Gietau 14'; Pen: Gietau 46'; Drop: Giteau 24' |

Millennium, Cardiff
Attendance: 74,000
Referee: Alan Lewis (Ireland)

| Wales | | | Australia |
| Lee Byrne | FB | 15 | FB | Drew Mitchell |
| Mark Jones | W | 14 | W | Peter Hynes (substituted off) 33' |
| Tom Shanklin | C | 13 | C | Ryan Cross |
| (substituted off) 17' Jamie Roberts | C | 12 | C | Stirling Mortlock (capt.) (substituted off) 2' |
| Shane Williams | W | 11 | W | Digby Ioane |
| Stephen Jones | FH | 10 | FH | Matt Giteau |
| Gareth Cooper | SH | 9 | SH | Luke Burgess |
| (substituted off) 61' Andy Powell | N8 | 8 | N8 | Richard Brown |
| Martyn Williams | F | 7 | F | Phil Waugh (substituted off) 62' |
| (capt.) Ryan Jones | F | 6 | F | Hugh McMeniman (substituted off) 69' |
| Alun Wyn Jones | L | 5 | L | Nathan Sharpe |
| Ian Gough | L | 4 | L | Mark Chisholm |
| Adam R. Jones | P | 3 | P | Al Baxter |
| Matthew Rees | H | 2 | H | Stephen Moore (yellow card) 27' to 37' (substituted off) 69' |
| Gethin Jenkins | P | 1 | P | Benn Robinson |
| | | Replacements |
| Richard Hibbard | | 16 | H | Adam Freier (substituted on) 69' |
| John Yapp | | 17 | | Matt Dunning |
| Luke Charteris | | 18 | F | Dean Mumm (substituted on) 69' |
| (substituted on) 61' Dafydd Jones | N8 | 19 | F | George Smith (substituted on) 62' |
| Martin Roberts | | 20 | | Sam Cordingley |
| James Hook | | 21 | C | Quade Cooper (substituted on) 2' |
| (substituted on) 17' Andrew Bishop | C | 22 | W | Lote Tuqiri (substituted on) 33' |
| | | Coaches |
| (New Zealand) Warren Gatland | | | | Robbie Deans (New Zealand) |

=== Final match with Barbarians ===
Australia was approached by the British Olympic Association to play the Barbarians at Wembley Stadium on 3 December 2008. The match formed part of the BOA's programme of events to celebrate the centenary of the first London Olympic Games where Australia defeated a Great Britain (Cornwall) side in the final 32 – 3. In 1908 France were the defending Olympic champions, but when they withdrew from the event, leaving just Australia and Great Britain to contest the gold medal, it was then County champions Cornwall who took to the field to represent the host nation. Cornwall had already been defeated in Australia's earlier 31-match tour. Cornwall's 1908 contribution was also further recognised by the presentation of the Cornwall Cup to the winning captain at Wembley, with the players of the respective sides receiving gold or silver commemorative medals. The game was the first rugby union fixture to take place in the new Wembley Stadium, the old stadium having been last used for Wales' last gasp 32–31 victory over England in the then Five Nations in 1999.

3 December 2008

| Barbarians | 11–18 | Australia XV |
| Try: Collins 61; Pen: Montgomery 34' 38' | report | Try: Tuqiri 12' Turner 77'; Con: O' Connor 13'; Pen: O' Connoer 19' 22' |

Wembley Stadium, London
Attendance: 44,000
Referee: Chris White

| Barbarians | | | Australia XV |
| (substituted off) 40' Percy Montgomery | FB | 15 | FB | James O'Connor (substituted off) 64' |
| Joe Rokocoko | W | 14 | W | Lote Tuqiri |
| (substituted off) 50' Rico Gear | C | 13 | C | Ryan Cross (substituted off) 57' |
| Jean de Villiers | C | 12 | C | Adam Ashley-Cooper |
| Bryan Habana | W | 11 | W | Digby Ioane |
| Frans Steyn | FH | 10 | FH | Quade Cooper |
| (substituted off) 59' Fourie du Preez | SH | 9 | SH | Brett Sheehan (substituted off) 50' |
| Schalk Burger | N8 | 8 | N8 | Richard Brown (substituted off) 46' |
| Richie McCaw | F | 7 | F | George Smith |
| Jerry Collins | F | 6 | F | Dean Mumm |
| (substituted off) 50' Johann Muller | L | 5 | L | Hugh McMeniman |
| Bakkies Botha | L | 4 | L | Mark Chisholm |
| (substituted off) 51' Census Johnston | P | 3 | P | Matt Dunning (substituted off) 46' |
| John Smit | H | 2 | H | Tatafu Polota-Nau (substituted off) 46' |
| (substituted off) 32' Federico Pucciariello | P | 1 | P | Sekope Kepu |
| | | Replacements |
| (substituted on) 59' Mark Regan | R | 16 | R | Adam Freier (substituted on) 46' |
| (substituted on) 32' Rodney Blake | R | 17 | R | Ben Alexander (substituted on) 46' |
| (substituted on) 50' Chris Jack | R | 18 | | Peter Kimlin |
| (substituted on) 51' Nick Köster | R | 19 | R | David Pocock (substituted on) 46' |
| (substituted on) 59' George Gregan | R | 20 | R | Luke Burgess (substituted on) 50' |
| (substituted on) 50' Ollie Smith | R | 21 | R | Lachie Turner (substituted on) 57' |
| (substituted on) 40' Shane Williams | R | 22 | R | Drew Mitchell (substituted on) 64' |
| | | Coaches |
| | | | | Robbie Deans (New Zealand) |

== See also ==
- 2008 end-of-year rugby union tests
