= 2009 Tri Nations Series =

- Date: 18 July 2009 – 19 September 2009

Final positions
- Champions: South Africa (3rd title)
- Bledisloe Cup: New Zealand
- Freedom Cup: South Africa
- Mandela Challenge Plate: South Africa

Tournament statistics
- Matches played: 9
- Tries scored: 27 (3 per match)
- Attendance: 399,093 (44,344 per match)
- Top scorer(s): (South Africa) Morné Steyn (95)
- Most tries: (Australia) Matt Giteau (3)

The 2009 Tri Nations Series was the fourteenth annual Tri Nations rugby union series between the national rugby union teams of New Zealand, Australia and South Africa, respectively nicknamed the All Blacks, Wallabies, and Springboks. The Springboks secured the season crown in their final match on 12 September, defeating the defending series champion All Blacks 32–29 in Hamilton.

== Background ==
New Zealand, South Africa and Australia were ranked first, second, and third in the world respectively by the International Rugby Board (IRB) immediately before the start of the Tri Nations on 30 June 2009. For South Africa, the tournament comes on the back of the British & Irish Lions tour.

== Tri-Nations 2009 ==
On 18 July, the All Blacks drew first blood in the series, coming from behind to defeat the Wallabies 22–16 at Eden Park. The All Blacks then departed for a two-test series against the Springboks in South Africa. The Boks won the first test 28–19, a result that not only gave them the series lead but also put them ahead of the All Blacks for first place in the IRB World Rankings. The following week, they defeated the All Blacks again, with Morné Steyn scoring all of their points in a 31–19 win. Steyn's performance broke the previous mark of New Zealand's Andrew Mehrtens for individual points in a Tri Nations match. The Boks completed their home leg with a 29–17 win over the Wallabies in Cape Town, with Steyn scoring 24 of their points.

The series then travelled to Australia for the Wallabies' three home matches. It opened with the second Bledisloe Cup match with the All Blacks, won by the All Blacks 19–18. The Springboks then picked up a 32–25 bonus-point win over the Wallabies in Perth. The Wallabies then defeated the Springboks 21–6, at Brisbane. The Springboks had to wait another week to try grasp the Tri-Nations title, but had to face the All Blacks at home in Hamilton. The Boks claimed the Tri Nations crown for the first time since 2004 with a 32–29 win. In the final match of the series on 19 September, the All Blacks thumped the Wallabies 33–6 in Wellington.

The final match of the Bledisloe Cup series between Australia and New Zealand took place after the Tri-Nations, on 11 October (the first 3 matches of the series were part of the Tri-Nations).

== Standings ==
Place	Nation	Games				Points			Bonus points	Table points
Place	Nation	Played	Won	Drawn	Lost	For	Against	Difference	Bonus points	Table points
1	South Africa	6	5	0	1	158	130	+28	1	21
2	New Zealand	6	3	0	3	141	131	+10	1	13
3	Australia	6	1	0	5	103	141	−38	3	7

== Fixtures ==
=== Round 1 ===
18 July 2009
19:35 NZST (UTC+12)

New Zealand	22–16	Australia (1 BP)
Try: McCaw 25' c Con: Donald (1/1) 26'; Pen: Donald (5/7) 14', 41', 44', 60', 73'	Report	Try: Barnes 3' c Con: Giteau (1/1) 4'; Pen: Giteau (3/5) 9', 19', 45'

Eden Park, Auckland
Attendance: 32,000
Referee: Craig Joubert (South Africa)

FB	15	Mils Muliaina
RW	14	Cory Jane
OC	13	Conrad Smith
IC	12	Ma'a Nonu
LW	11	Sitiveni Sivivatu
FH	10	Stephen Donald
SH	9	Jimmy Cowan	(substituted off) 53'
N8	8	Rodney So'oialo	(substituted off) 61'
OF	7	Richie McCaw (c)
BF	6	Jerome Kaino
RL	5	Isaac Ross	(substituted off) 71'
LL	4	Brad Thorn
TP	3	Neemia Tialata	(substituted off) 44'
HK	2	Andrew Hore	(substituted off) 44'
LP	1	Tony Woodcock
Replacements:
HK	16	Keven Mealamu	(substituted on) 44'
PR	17	Owen Franks	(substituted on) 44'
LK	18	Jason Eaton	(substituted on) 71'
N8	19	Kieran Read	(substituted on) 61'
SH	20	Piri Weepu	(substituted on) 53'
FH	21	Luke McAlister
WG	22	Joe Rokocoko
Coach:
(New Zealand) Graham Henry

FB	15	Adam Ashley-Cooper
RW	14	Lachlan Turner
OC	13	Stirling Mortlock (c)
IC	12	Berrick Barnes	(substituted off) 61'
LW	11	Drew Mitchell
FH	10	Matt Giteau
SH	9	Luke Burgess	(substituted off) 74'
N8	8	Wycliff Palu
OF	7	George Smith
BF	6	Richard Brown	(substituted off) 50'
RL	5	Nathan Sharpe
LL	4	James Horwill	39' to 45'		63' to 70'
TP	3	Al Baxter	(substituted off) 71'
HK	2	Stephen Moore
LP	1	Benn Robinson
Replacements:
HK	16	Tatafu Polota-Nau
PR	17	Ben Alexander	(substituted on) 71'
LK	18	Dean Mumm	(substituted on) 39'	(substituted off) 45'	(substituted on) 63'	(substituted off) 70'
N8	19	Phil Waugh
FL	20	David Pocock	(substituted on) 50'
FH	21	Will Genia	(substituted on) 74'
FB	22	James O'Connor	(substituted on) 61'
Coach:
(New Zealand) Robbie Deans

Touch judges:
Marius Jonker (South Africa)
Cobus Wessels (South Africa)
Television match official:
Vinny Munro (New Zealand)

Notes:

- George Smith (Australia) won his 100th test cap, the 10th player to reach that milestone.

=== Round 2 ===
25 July 2009
15:00 SAST (UTC+02)

South Africa	28–19	New Zealand
Tries: Pienaar 24' m Fourie 72' m Pen: F. Steyn (2/2) 6', 32'; Pienaar (1/4) 16'; M. Steyn (3/3) 42', 56', 77'	Report	Try: Smith 47' c Con: Donald (1/1) 49'; Pen: Donald (4/5) 3', 51', 63', 73'

Free State Stadium, Bloemfontein
Attendance: 37,081
Referee: Alain Rolland (Ireland)

FB	15	François Steyn
RW	14	JP Pietersen
OC	13	Jaque Fourie
IC	12	Jean de Villiers	(substituted off) 68'
LW	11	Bryan Habana
FH	10	Ruan Pienaar	(substituted off) 40'
SH	9	Fourie du Preez	(substituted off) 73'
N8	8	Pierre Spies
BF	7	Juan Smith
OF	6	Heinrich Brüssow
RL	5	Victor Matfield
LL	4	Bakkies Botha	(substituted off) 68'
TP	3	John Smit (c)	64' to 73'
HK	2	Bismarck du Plessis	(substituted off) 79'
LP	1	Tendai Mtawarira
Replacements:
HK	16	Chiliboy Ralepelle	(substituted on) 79'
PR	17	Jannie du Plessis	(substituted on) 64'	(substituted off) 73'
LK	18	Danie Rossouw	(substituted on) 68'
N8	19	Ryan Kankowski
SH	20	Ricky Januarie	(substituted on) 73'
FH	21	Morné Steyn	(substituted on) 40'
FB	22	Wynand Olivier	(substituted on) 68'
Coach:
(South Africa) Peter de Villiers

FB	15	Mils Muliaina
RW	14	Joe Rokocoko
OC	13	Conrad Smith	(substituted off) 75'
IC	12	Ma'a Nonu
LW	11	Sitiveni Sivivatu
FH	10	Stephen Donald
SH	9	Brendon Leonard	(substituted off) 49'
N8	8	Rodney So'oialo	(substituted off) 52'
OF	7	Richie McCaw (c)
BF	6	Jerome Kaino
RL	5	Isaac Ross	(substituted off) 64'
LL	4	Brad Thorn
TP	3	Neemia Tialata	(substituted off) 42'
HK	2	Andrew Hore	(substituted off) 57'
LP	1	Tony Woodcock
Replacements:
HK	16	Keven Mealamu	(substituted on) 57'
PR	17	Owen Franks	(substituted on) 42'
LK	18	Jason Eaton	(substituted on) 64'
N8	19	Kieran Read	(substituted on) 52'
SH	20	Piri Weepu	(substituted on) 49'
FH	21	Luke McAlister	(substituted on) 75'
FB	22	Cory Jane
Coach:
(New Zealand) Graham Henry

Touch judges:
Nigel Owens (Wales)
Tim Hayes (Wales)
Television match official:
Johann Meuwesen (South Africa)

=== Round 3 ===
1 August 2009
17:00 SAST (UTC+02)

South Africa	31–19	New Zealand
Try: M. Steyn 38' c Con: M. Steyn (1/1) 39' 'Pen: M. Steyn (8/9) 5', 15', 18', 32', 40+2', 56', 64', 74'	Report	Try: Ross 12' c Con: Donald (1/1) 13'; Pen: Donald (3/3) 7', 29', 51'; McAlister (1/1) 61'

Kings Park Stadium, Durban
Attendance: 52,572
Referee: Nigel Owens (Wales)

FB	15	François Steyn
RW	14	JP Pietersen	(yellow card) 28' to 38'
OC	13	Jaque Fourie		(substituted off) 78'
IC	12	Jean de Villiers		(substituted off) 70'
LW	11	Bryan Habana
FH	10	Morné Steyn
SH	9	Fourie du Preez		(substituted off) 78'
N8	8	Pierre Spies
BF	7	Juan Smith		(substituted off) 64'
OF	6	Heinrich Brüssow
RL	5	Victor Matfield
LL	4	Bakkies Botha	(yellow card) 49' to 59'	(substituted off) 78'
TP	3	John Smit (c)		(substituted off) 78'
HK	2	Bismarck du Plessis		(substituted off) 80'
LP	1	Tendai Mtawarira
Replacements:
HK	16	Chiliboy Ralepelle		(substituted on) 80'
PR	17	Jannie du Plessis		(substituted on) 78'
LK	18	Andries Bekker		(substituted on) 78'
N8	19	Danie Rossouw		(substituted on) 64'
SH	20	Ricky Januarie		(substituted on) 78'
FH	21	Adrian Jacobs		(substituted on) 70'
FB	22	Wynand Olivier		(substituted on) 78'
Coach:
(South Africa) Peter de Villiers

FB	15	Mils Muliaina
RW	14	Joe Rokocoko
OC	13	Conrad Smith
IC	12	Ma'a Nonu
LW	11	Sitiveni Sivivatu
FH	10	Stephen Donald		(substituted off) 61'
SH	9	Jimmy Cowan		(substituted off) 43'
N8	8	Rodney So'oialo
OF	7	Richie McCaw (c)
BF	6	Jerome Kaino		(substituted off) 59'
RL	5	Isaac Ross	(yellow card) 30' to 40'
LL	4	Brad Thorn
TP	3	Owen Franks		(substituted off) 65'
HK	2	Andrew Hore		(substituted off) 43'	(substituted on) 76'
LP	1	Tony Woodcock
Replacements:
HK	16	Keven Mealamu		(substituted on) 43'	(substituted off) 76'
PR	17	John Afoa		(substituted on) 65'
LK	18	Jason Eaton
N8	19	Kieran Read		(substituted on) 59'
SH	20	Piri Weepu		(substituted on) 43'
FH	21	Luke McAlister		(substituted on) 61'
FB	22	Cory Jane
Coach:
(New Zealand) Graham Henry

Touch judges:
Alain Rolland (Ireland)
Tim Hayes (Wales)
Television match official:
Shaun Veldsman (South Africa)

Notes:

- Morné Steyn's 31 points set a new individual record for points in a Tri Nations match, breaking Andrew Mehrtens' previous mark of 29 for the All Blacks against Australia at Eden Park in 1999 as well as the most points scored by an individual in a game against the All Blacks. It is also an all-time Test record for most points by a player who was responsible for all of his team's scoring.

=== Round 4 ===
8 August 2009
17:00 SAST (UTC+02)

South Africa	29–17	Australia
Try: Matfield 27' m Pen: M. Steyn (7/7) 8', 11', 13', 21', 36', 54', 78'; Drop: M. Steyn (1/1) 24'	Report	Tries: Ashley-Cooper 2' c Giteau 66' c Con: Giteau (2/2) 3', 67'; Drop: Barnes (1/1) 14'

Newlands Stadium, Cape Town
Attendance: 48,397
Referee: Alain Rolland (Ireland)

FB	15	François Steyn	(substituted off) 60'
RW	14	JP Pietersen
OC	13	Jaque Fourie
IC	12	Jean de Villiers	(substituted off) 71'
LW	11	Bryan Habana
FH	10	Morné Steyn
SH	9	Fourie du Preez	(substituted off) 76'
N8	8	Pierre Spies
BF	7	Juan Smith	(substituted off) 52'
OF	6	Heinrich Brüssow
RL	5	Victor Matfield
LL	4	Bakkies Botha	(substituted off) 76'
TP	3	John Smit (c)
HK	2	Bismarck du Plessis
LP	1	Tendai Mtawarira	(substituted off) 68'
Replacements:
HK	16	Chiliboy Ralepelle
PR	17	Jannie du Plessis	(substituted on) 68'
LK	18	Andries Bekker	(substituted on) 76'
N8	19	Danie Rossouw	(substituted on) 52'
SH	20	Ricky Januarie	(substituted on) 76'
FH	21	Ruan Pienaar	(substituted on) 60'
FB	22	Adrian Jacobs	(substituted on) 71'
Coach:
(South Africa) Peter de Villiers

FB	15	Adam Ashley-Cooper
RW	14	Lachlan Turner
OC	13	Stirling Mortlock (c)		(substituted off) 29'
IC	12	Berrick Barnes
LW	11	Drew Mitchell
FH	10	Matt Giteau	(yellow card) 34' to 44'
SH	9	Luke Burgess		(substituted off) 55'
N8	8	Wycliff Palu		(substituted off) 55'
OF	7	George Smith	(yellow card) 78' to end'
BF	6	Richard Brown	(yellow card) 36' to 46'
RL	5	Nathan Sharpe
LL	4	James Horwill		(substituted off) 40'
TP	3	Al Baxter		(substituted off) 52'
HK	2	Stephen Moore		(substituted off) 50'
LP	1	Benn Robinson
Replacements:
HK	16	Tatafu Polota-Nau		(substituted on) 50'
PR	17	Ben Alexander		(substituted on) 52'
LK	18	Dean Mumm		(substituted on) 40'
N8	19	David Pocock		(substituted on) 55'
SH	20	Will Genia		(substituted on) 55'
FH	21	Peter Hynes
FB	22	James O'Connor		(substituted on) 29'
Coach:
(New Zealand) Robbie Deans

Touch judges:
Nigel Owens (Wales)
Tim Hayes (Wales)
Television match official:
Shaun Veldsman (South Africa)

=== Round 5 ===
22 August 2009
20:00 AEST (UTC+10)

(1 BP) Australia	18–19	New Zealand
Pen: Giteau (6/6) 6', 10', 34', 40'+2', 47', 67'	Report	Try: Nonu 64' c Con: Carter (1/1) 65'; Pen: Carter (4/5) 3', 44', 58', 78'

Stadium Australia, Sydney
Attendance: 80,228
Referee: Jonathan Kaplan (South Africa)

FB	15	James O'Connor		(substituted off) 45'
RW	14	Lachlan Turner
OC	13	Adam Ashley-Cooper
IC	12	Berrick Barnes		(substituted off) 40+2'
LW	11	Drew Mitchell
FH	10	Matt Giteau
SH	9	Luke Burgess		(substituted off) 75'
N8	8	Richard Brown	(yellow card) 41' to 51'	(substituted off) 70'
OF	7	George Smith (c)
BF	6	Rocky Elsom
RL	5	Nathan Sharpe		(substituted off) 70'
LL	4	James Horwill
TP	3	Al Baxter				(substituted off) 31'
HK	2	Stephen Moore		20' to 31'		(substituted off) 49'
LP	1	Benn Robinson		20' to 22'
Replacements:
HK	16	Tatafu Polota-Nau		(substituted on) 20'	(substituted off) 31'	(substituted on) 49'
PR	17	Ben Alexander		(substituted on) 20'	(substituted off) 22'	(substituted on) 31'
LK	18	Dean Mumm		(substituted on) 70'
N8	19	David Pocock		(substituted on) 70'
SH	20	Will Genia		(substituted on) 75'
FH	21	Ryan Cross		(substituted on) 40+2'
FB	22	Peter Hynes		(substituted on) 45'
Coach:
(New Zealand) Robbie Deans

FB	15	Mils Muliaina
RW	14	Joe Rokocoko
OC	13	Conrad Smith			(substituted off) 41'
IC	12	Luke McAlister	3' to 10'		(substituted off) 49'
LW	11	Sitiveni Sivivatu
FH	10	Dan Carter
SH	9	Jimmy Cowan
N8	8	Kieran Read
OF	7	Richie McCaw (c)
BF	6	Jerome Kaino	(substituted off) 67'
RL	5	Isaac Ross
LL	4	Brad Thorn
TP	3	Owen Franks	(substituted off) 69'
HK	2	Andrew Hore
LP	1	Tony Woodcock
Replacements:
HK	16	Aled de Malmanche
PR	17	John Afoa	(substituted on) 69'
LK	18	Jason Eaton
N8	19	Rodney So'oialo	(substituted on) 67'
SH	20	Brendon Leonard
FH	21	Stephen Donald			(substituted on) 49'
CE	22	Ma'a Nonu	(substituted on) 3'	(substituted off) 10'	(substituted on) 41'
Coach:
(New Zealand) Graham Henry

Touch judges:
Craig Joubert (South Africa)
Cobus Wessels (South Africa)
Television match official:
George Ayoub (Australia)

=== Round 6 ===
29 August 2009
18:00 AWST (UTC+08)

(1 BP) Australia	25–32	South Africa (1 BP)
Tries: Giteau (2) 43' c, 75' m Turner 80' c Con: Giteau (2/3) 44', 80'; Pen: Giteau (2/4) 27', 39'	Report	Tries: Du Preez 5' c Fourie 9' m Habana (2) 32' c, 53' c Con: M. Steyn (3/4); Pen: M. Steyn (2/3) 16', 67'

Subiaco Oval, Perth
Attendance: 36,148
Referee: Bryce Lawrence (New Zealand)

FB	15	James O'Connor	(substituted off) 77'
RW	14	Lachlan Turner
OC	13	Ryan Cross	(substituted off) 65'
IC	12	Adam Ashley-Cooper
LW	11	Peter Hynes
FH	10	Matt Giteau
SH	9	Luke Burgess	(substituted off) 56'
N8	8	Richard Brown	(substituted off) 48'
OF	7	George Smith (c)
BF	6	Rocky Elsom
RL	5	Mark Chisholm
LL	4	James Horwill
TP	3	Ben Alexander
HK	2	Stephen Moore	(substituted off) 54'
LP	1	Benn Robinson
Replacements:
HK	16	Tatafu Polota-Nau	(substituted on) 54'
PR	17	Al Baxter
LK	18	Dean Mumm
N8	19	David Pocock	(substituted on) 48'
SH	20	Will Genia	(substituted on) 56'
FH	21	Quade Cooper	(substituted on) 65'
FB	22	Drew Mitchell	(substituted on) 77'
Coach:
(New Zealand) Robbie Deans

FB	15	Ruan Pienaar	(substituted off) 72'
RW	14	JP Pietersen	(substituted off) 65'
OC	13	Jaque Fourie
IC	12	Jean de Villiers
LW	11	Bryan Habana
FH	10	Morné Steyn
SH	9	Fourie du Preez	(substituted off) 76'
N8	8	Pierre Spies
BF	7	Juan Smith	(substituted off) 54'
OF	6	Heinrich Brüssow
RL	5	Victor Matfield
LL	4	Bakkies Botha	(substituted off) 55'
TP	3	John Smit (c)	(substituted off) 76'
HK	2	Bismarck du Plessis	(substituted off) 76'
LP	1	Tendai Mtawarira
Replacements:
HK	16	Chiliboy Ralepelle	(substituted on) 76'
PR	17	Jannie du Plessis	(substituted on) 76'
LK	18	Andries Bekker	(substituted on) 55'
N8	19	Schalk Burger	(substituted on) 54'
SH	20	Ricky Januarie	(substituted on) 76'
FH	21	Adrian Jacobs	(substituted on) 65'
FB	22	François Steyn	(substituted on) 72'
Coach:
(South Africa) Peter de Villiers

Touch judges:
Chris Pollock (New Zealand)
Vinny Munro (New Zealand)
Television match official:
Keith Brown (New Zealand)

=== Round 7 ===
5 September 2009
20:00 AEST (UTC+10)

Australia	21–6	South Africa
Tries: Ashley-Cooper 62' c O'Connor 76' m Con: Giteau (1/2) 63'; Pen: Giteau (2/3) 5', 26'; Drop: Giteau (1/1) 34'	Report	Pen: M. Steyn (1/1) 36'; Drop: M. Steyn (1/1) 28'

Lang Park, Brisbane
Attendance: 47,481
Referee: Wayne Barnes (England)

FB	15	James O'Connor
RW	14	Lachlan Turner	(substituted off) 30'
OC	13	Adam Ashley-Cooper
IC	12	Berrick Barnes	(substituted off) 74'
LW	11	Drew Mitchell
FH	10	Matt Giteau
SH	9	Will Genia
N8	8	George Smith (c)
OF	7	David Pocock
BF	6	Rocky Elsom
RL	5	Mark Chisholm
LL	4	James Horwill
TP	3	Ben Alexander	(substituted off) 78'
HK	2	Tatafu Polota-Nau	(substituted off) 32'
LP	1	Benn Robinson
Replacements:
HK	16	Stephen Moore	(substituted on) 32'
PR	17	Pek Cowan	(substituted on) 78'
LK	18	Dean Mumm
N8	19	Wycliff Palu
SH	20	Luke Burgess
FH	21	Quade Cooper	(substituted on) 74'
FB	22	Peter Hynes	(substituted on) 30'
Coach:
(New Zealand) Robbie Deans

FB	15	Ruan Pienaar	(substituted off) 68'
RW	14	Odwa Ndungane
OC	13	Jaque Fourie
IC	12	Jean de Villiers
LW	11	Bryan Habana	(substituted off) 35'
FH	10	Morné Steyn
SH	9	Fourie du Preez
N8	8	Pierre Spies
BF	7	Juan Smith
OF	6	Heinrich Brüssow	(substituted off) 59'
RL	5	Victor Matfield
LL	4	Bakkies Botha	(substituted off) 60'
TP	3	John Smit (c)
HK	2	Bismarck du Plessis
LP	1	Tendai Mtawarira
Replacements:
HK	16	Chiliboy Ralepelle
PR	17	Jannie du Plessis
LK	18	Danie Rossouw	(substituted on) 60'
N8	19	Schalk Burger	(substituted on) 59'
SH	20	Ricky Januarie
FH	21	Adrian Jacobs	(substituted on) 35'
FB	22	François Steyn	(substituted on) 68'
Coach:
(South Africa) Peter de Villiers

Touch judges:
Bryce Lawrence (New Zealand)
Vinny Munro (New Zealand)

Television match official:
George Ayoub (Australia)

=== Round 8 ===
12 September 2009
19:35 NZST (UTC+12)

(1 BP) New Zealand	29–32	South Africa
Tries: Sivivatu 55' c McCaw 78' c Con: Carter (2/2); Pen: Carter (5/5) 1', 14', 22', 34', 64'	Report	Tries: Du Preez 19' c De Villiers 51' c Con: M. Steyn (2/2); Pen: F. Steyn (3/3) 6', 9', 26'; M. Steyn (2/2) 33', 71'; Drop: M. Steyn (1/1) 17'

Waikato Stadium, Hamilton
Attendance: 31,000
Referee: Nigel Owens (Wales)

FB	15	Mils Muliaina
RW	14	Joe Rokocoko
OC	13	Ma'a Nonu
IC	12	Stephen Donald	(substituted off) 50'
LW	11	Sitiveni Sivivatu	(substituted off) 72'
FH	10	Dan Carter
SH	9	Jimmy Cowan
N8	8	Kieran Read
OF	7	Richie McCaw (c)
BF	6	Jerome Kaino	(substituted off) 72'
RL	5	Isaac Ross
LL	4	Brad Thorn
TP	3	Owen Franks	(substituted off) 50'
HK	2	Andrew Hore
LP	1	Tony Woodcock
Replacements:
HK	16	Aled de Malmanche
PR	17	John Afoa	(substituted on) 50'
FL	18	Adam Thomson	(substituted on) 72'
N8	19	Rodney So'oialo
SH	20	Brendon Leonard
CR	21	Isaia Toeava	(substituted on) 50'
FB	22	Cory Jane	(substituted on) 72'
Coach:
(New Zealand) Graham Henry

FB	15	François Steyn
RW	14	Odwa Ndungane
OC	13	Jaque Fourie
IC	12	Jean de Villiers
LW	11	Bryan Habana	(substituted off) 77'
FH	10	Morné Steyn
SH	9	Fourie du Preez	(substituted off) 77'
N8	8	Pierre Spies
BF	7	Schalk Burger	(substituted off) 67'
OF	6	Heinrich Brüssow
RL	5	Victor Matfield
LL	4	Bakkies Botha	(substituted off) 71'
TP	3	John Smit (c)
HK	2	Bismarck du Plessis	(substituted off) 80'
LP	1	Tendai Mtawarira	(substituted off) 79'
Replacements:
HK	16	Chiliboy Ralepelle	(substituted on) 80'
PR	17	Jannie du Plessis	(substituted on) 79'
LK	18	Danie Rossouw	(substituted on) 71'
N8	19	Ryan Kankowski	(substituted on) 67'
SH	20	Ricky Januarie	(substituted on) 77'
FH	21	Adrian Jacobs	(substituted on) 77'
FB	22	Ruan Pienaar
Coach:
(South Africa) Peter de Villiers

Touch judges:
Wayne Barnes (England)
Stuart Dickinson (Australia)
Television match official:
George Ayoub (New Zealand)

Notes:

- Morné Steyn became the highest individual point scorer in a Tri-Nations season with 95 points this season alone.
- Dan Carter's first penalty made him the leading point scorer in Tri Nations history, surpassing former All Black Andrew Mehrtens. Carter entered the match with 326 Tri Nations points to Mehrtens' 328, and ended the evening with 345.

=== Round 9 ===
19 September 2009
19:35 NZST (UTC+12)

New Zealand	33–6	Australia
Tries: Jane 31' c Nonu 75' c Rokocoko 80' c Con: Carter (3/3); Pen: Carter (4/5) 14', 16', 21', 46'	Report	Pen: Giteau (1/2) 7'; Drop: Barnes (1/1) 28'

Wellington Regional Stadium, Wellington
Attendance: 34,186
Referee: Craig Joubert (South Africa)

FB	15	Mils Muliaina
RW	14	Cory Jane		(substituted off) 59'
OC	13	Isaia Toeava	(yellow card) 29' to 39'
IC	12	Ma'a Nonu
LW	11	Joe Rokocoko
FH	10	Dan Carter
SH	9	Jimmy Cowan		(substituted off) 68'
N8	8	Kieran Read
OF	7	Richie McCaw (c)
BF	6	Adam Thomson		(substituted off) 72'
RL	5	Tom Donnelly		(substituted off) 66'
LL	4	Brad Thorn
TP	3	Neemia Tialata		(substituted off) 47'
HK	2	Andrew Hore
LP	1	Tony Woodcock
Replacements:
HK	16	Aled de Malmanche
PR	17	John Afoa		(substituted on) 47'
LK	18	Jason Eaton		(substituted on) 66'
N8	19	Rodney So'oialo		(substituted on) 72'
SH	20	Brendon Leonard		(substituted on) 68'
FH	21	Stephen Donald
FB	22	Hosea Gear		(substituted on) 59'
Coach:
(New Zealand) Graham Henry

FB	15	James O'Connor
RW	14	Lachlan Turner
OC	13	Adam Ashley-Cooper
IC	12	Berrick Barnes
LW	11	Drew Mitchell
FH	10	Matt Giteau
SH	9	Will Genia	(substituted off) 76'
N8	8	George Smith (c)		(substituted off) 68'
OF	7	David Pocock
BF	6	Rocky Elsom (c)	61' to 68'
RL	5	Mark Chisholm
LL	4	James Horwill
TP	3	Ben Alexander
HK	2	Tatafu Polota-Nau	(substituted off) 48'
LP	1	Benn Robinson	(substituted off) 67'
Replacements:
HK	16	Stephen Moore	(substituted on) 48'
PR	17	Pekaho Cowan	(substituted on) 67'
LK	18	Dean Mumm
N8	19	Wycliff Palu	(substituted on) 61'
SH	20	Luke Burgess	(substituted on) 76'
FH	21	Quade Cooper
FB	22	Peter Hynes
Coach:
(New Zealand) Robbie Deans

Touch judges:
Wayne Barnes (England)
Cobus Wessels (South Africa)
Television match official:
Shaun Veldsman (South Africa)

Notes:

- Dan Carter surpassed Ronan O'Gara as the 5th highest point scorer with 930 points
