= Lachlan Turner =

Australia international rugby union player

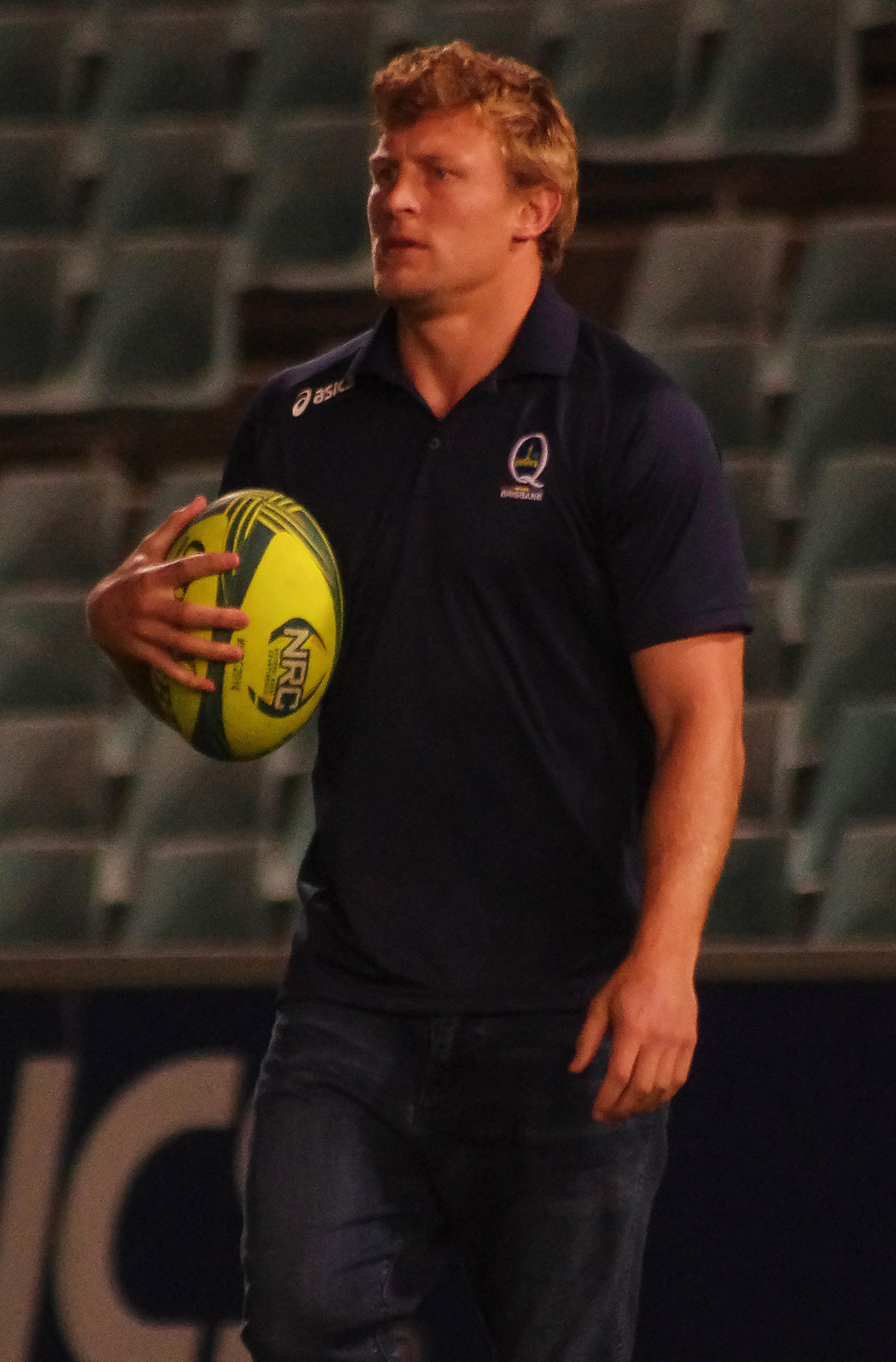
- Born: Lachlan David Turner; 11 May 1987 (age 39) Sydney, New South Wales, Australia
- Height: 1.89 m (6 ft 2 in)
- Weight: 96 kg (15 st 2 lb; 212 lb)
- School: Newington College

Rugby union career
- Position(s): Centre, Wing, Fullback
Senior career
| Years | Team | Apps | (Points) |
| 2006–2013 | Eastwood | | |
| 2007 | Western Sydney Rams | 8 | (10) |
| 2014 | Brisbane City | 3 | (5) |
| 2015–2016 | Toulon | 7 | (20) |
| 2016–2018 | Exeter Chiefs | 26 | (30) |
Super Rugby
| Years | Team | Apps | (Points) |
| 2007–2013 | Waratahs | 71 | (135) |
| 2014–2015 | Reds | 22 | (60) |
- Correct as of 14 June 2015
International career
| Years | Team | Apps | (Points) |
| 2005 | Australia Schoolboys | 6 | (0) |
| 2005 | Australia U19 | 4 | (19) |
| 2005 | Australia A | 4 | (30) |
| 2008–2011 | Australia | 15 | (20) |
Medal record
Men's rugby union
Representing Australia
Rugby World Cup
| Bronze medal – third place | 2011 New Zealand | Squad |
Men's rugby sevens
Commonwealth Games
| Silver medal – second place | 2010 Delhi | Team competition |

Lachlan David Turner (born 11 May 1987) is an Australian former professional rugby union player. His playing position was wing. He had a strong kicking game, which allowed him to also play at fullback. Turner has represented Australia in international Test rugby. He played Super Rugby for the New South Wales Waratahs from 2007 to 2013, before joining the Queensland Reds in 2014. Turner then joined the NSW Waratahs but tore his hamstring and had to have surgery.

== Early life ==
Born in Sydney, Turner attended Newington College and was selected for the Australian Schoolboys rugby team in 2005.

Turner played club rugby for Eastwood, and was invited to join the Waratahs Academy in 2006 under coach Joe Barakat's guidance. He was selected for and played in the Australian Under 19 side which won the 2006 Under 19 Rugby World Championship in Dubai.

== Club career ==
Turner made his debut for the Waratahs against Reds in the 2006 Australian Provincial Championship, and was awarded the inaugural Chris Whitaker Aspiring Waratah Award at the end of the 2006 season.

In 2007, Turner earned his first Super 14 cap for the Waratahs in round seven against the Stormers in Sydney. The highlight for Turner came against the Crusaders at Sydney Football Stadium, where he scored a solo try from his own half, beating several defenders for pace. He capped off the season by winning the 2007 Super Rugby Rookie of the Year award.

From his debut in 2007 through to the end of the 2011 season, Turner did not miss a Super Rugby match for the Waratahs – a run of 67 consecutive appearances.

Turner scored two tries in the 2008 Super 14 final against the Crusaders in Christchurch, giving the Waratahs an early 12–3 lead, but they lost structure after Kurtley Beale went off injured and the Crusaders won the match 20–12 to claim the 2008 title. In the 2010 season, he scored an intercept try against the Blues with eight minutes left, sealing the win for the Waratahs and keeping the team in top four finals contention. During 2011, he switched position from wing to centre for the first time for the Waratahs, to cover for the injured Rob Horne.

Turner sustained a hamstring tear in 2012 during a pre-season trial match for the Waratahs against Samoa, and was forced to miss all but the last two matches of the 2012 Super Rugby season. In April 2013, he had his Super Rugby ambitions derailed for the second year in a row after suffering a season ending leg break while playing Sydney club rugby for Eastwood against Manly. Turner had been in and out of the Waratahs side until then, and had earned only two Super caps for the 2013 season, in the selection battle for the Waratahs back three.

In 2013, Turner signed a two-year deal to play for the Queensland Reds, starting from the 2014 Super Rugby season.

In 2015, Turner came over to Europe and joined RC Toulon as cover during the 2015 Rugby World Cup. However, on 16 February 2016 it was announced that Turner had joined Aviva Premiership club Exeter Chiefs on a two-and-a-half-year deal.

== International career ==
On 25 May 2007, Turner was selected for Australia A against Tonga at Sydney Football Stadium in Sydney. He scored three tries in a man-of-the-match performance. Despite calls from some quarters for him to be included in the Wallabies squad for the 2007 Rugby World Cup in France, the then 20-year-old winger was left at home.

An injury to Lote Tuqiri enabled Turner to make his Test debut on 5 July 2008, starting on the wing against France in Brisbane. He toured with the Wallabies on the 2008 Spring tour, and played against Italy in Padua. Turner was selected for all three 2009 June Tests and for all six matches of the 2009 Tri Nations Series. He toured with the Wallabies on the 2009 Spring tour but did not play any Test matches.

In August 2010, he was recalled to the Wallabies squad following injuries to Peter Hynes and Cameron Shepherd, and when Drew Mitchell succumbed to a hamstring injury, Turner played on the wing against the All Blacks at ANZ Stadium in the Bledisloe Cup match in Sydney on 11 September 2010. Turner made two further Wallaby tours, in 2010 and 2011. He played in the wins over Italy and France in 2010, and in the win against Wales at Millennium Stadium in 2011.

He was a member of the 2010 Rugby Sevens squad that won silver at the Delhi Commonwealth Games.

== Personal achievement ==
On 15 September 2010, Turner won the "Gatorade Bolt", an invitational 100 metres race held at Sydney Olympic Park, to earn himself the unofficial title of the fastest professional footballer in Australia. The event was named for the presence of athletics sprint champion Usain Bolt, who provided some coaching for the runners and also celebrated the 10th anniversary of the 2000 Summer Olympics opening ceremony held in Sydney.

The race featured Turner's rugby union club teammate John Grant, NRL players Jarryd Hayne, Greg Inglis, Josh Morris, Nathan Gardner, and Ben Barba, plus Matt Lewis from the A-League, and Courtenay Dempsey from the AFL. Turner won the race with a time of 11.10s, in a close contest from Grant (11.15) and league's Jarryd Hayne (11.20).
