= Dan Williams (rugby union) =

- Born: Daniel Williams; 1 February 1989 (age 37) England
- Height: 6 ft 5 in (1.96 m)
- Weight: 16 st 5 lb (104 kg)
- School: Ivybridge Community College
- University: Hartpury College

Rugby union career
- Position: Flanker
Senior career
Years	Team	Apps	(Points)
2008–2011	Gloucester Rugby	4	
2008-2010	Moseley	16	
2010–2011	London Welsh	14	
2011–2013	US Colomiers	40	(5)
2016-2018	Plymouth Albion	40+	(70)
Coaching career
- Years: Team
- 2018-2019: Plymouth Albion
- 2021-to date: Torquay Athletic RFC

Dan Williams (born 1 February 1989) was a rugby union player who either played Lock or Flanker. He played for Gloucester Rugby, Moseley, London Welsh, US Colomiers and Plymouth Albion.

In his younger career he represented England at age group levels from U16s, U18s and U20s. He started his career with Gloucester Rugby in 2008, and as a member of the Gloucester Academy he was also registered to play for Moseley. He did so on several occasions, most notably in the EDF National Trophy Final of 2009, where he won a winners medal. He also played on loan for London Welsh in the Championship. Williams moved to Colomiers in 2011 and in his first season helped the club win promotion from Federale 1 into Pro D2. He was released by Colomiers at the end of season 2012–13 and finished his professional career at Plymouth Albion in the RFU National League 1.

He is currently the Head Coach at Torquay Athletic RFC based in South Devon. In the 2022/23 season, Williams steered the 'Tics' to a second-place finish in the Counties 2 Devon league, with a win percentage of 74%. In the clubs most successful season for a number of years, Williams also saw his side reach the final of the Devon Junior Cup.

In the 2023/24 season, William's side again finished 2nd in the league. However, they lifted the Devon Junior Cup defeating Exeter Saracens 36–12 at Torquay's Recreation Ground. His side were also one of the highest points scorers in the country and came 7th nationally for tries scored, across all of the English leagues.

In the 2024–25 season, Williams led Torquay to the club's first promotion in 14 years, completing an undefeated league campaign and winning the club's first league-and-cup double. The team's most recent defeat had come on 3 February 2024. Torquay won the Counties 2 Devon title with bonus-point victories in every match. They also won the Devon Intermediate Cup, defeating Western Counties West side Plymstock Oaks 55–50 at Horsham Fields, with Williams coming off the bench to score a try and secure a decisive lineout. As of the end of the season, Williams's coaching record stood at 71 matches played, 61 won (86%), and 10 lost (14%), with 2,818 points scored and 885 conceded across 414 tries, 269 conversions, and 33 penalties — an average of 39.6 points scored per match against 12.4 conceded. Twenty-two Colts players made their senior debuts under him. The following season, Torquay was scheduled to play in the Western Counties West League alongside Paignton and Newton Abbot.
