= Matt Hodgson =

Australia international rugby union player

- Born: Matt Hodgson; 25 June 1981 (age 45) Sydney, New South Wales, Australia
- Height: 1.85 m (6 ft 1 in)
- Weight: 103 kg (16 st 3 lb)

Rugby union career
- Position: Openside flanker
Amateur team(s)
Years	Team	Apps	(Points)
1994–1999	Avoca Sharks		
1999–2003	Eastwood		
2004–2005	Manly		
2005–2006	Palmyra RC		
2007–2017	Wanneroo Districts		
2009–2011	Eastern Suburbs		
Senior career
Years	Team	Apps	(Points)
2007	Melbourne Rebels	0	(0)
2014	Perth Spirit	1	(0)
Super Rugby
Years	Team	Apps	(Points)
2003	Waratahs	0	(0)
2006–2017	Force	140	(98)
- Correct as of 15 July 2017
International career
Years	Team	Apps	(Points)
2010–2017	Wallabies	11	(0)
2005, 2008–11	Australia A		
2002	Australia U-21		
- Correct as of 17 November 2014
National sevens team
Years	Team		Comps
2005, 2008	Australia Sevens		
Medal record
Men's rugby union
Representing Australia
Rugby World Cup
Bronze medal – third place	2011 New Zealand	Squad

Matt Hodgson (born 25 June 1981) is an Australian sports administrator and former professional rugby union player for the Western Force and the Wallabies, the Australian national team. He is currently head of rugby at Global Rapid Rugby which launched its Asia-Pacific Showcase competition in 2019.

During his rugby career Hodgson won eleven caps for Australia and was the first Western Force player to earn 100 caps for the club. He captained the Force for many years, including in 2014 when the club had the most successful season in their Super Rugby history with nine wins. Hodgson's leadership and playing form in that season earned him a recall to the Wallabies for the test series against France.

== Career ==
Hodgson began his rugby career with his local team the Avoca Sharks in the NSW Central Coast town of Avoca Beach. At age 17, Hodgson was drafted by the New South Wales Waratahs as a flyhalf/centre and was redeveloped as a loose forward. However, he did not receive any Super Rugby caps for the franchise in that season, which saw him leave the club to represent amateur clubs to develop into a full-time flanker. While training with the Waratahs, Hodgson played for Sydney Club Rugby teams Eastwood Rugby Club (1999–2003) and Manly RUFC (2004–05). His form as a flanker, saw Hodgson receive a call up into the Australian under-21s team for the 2002 Under 21 Rugby World Championship. He started in the number 7 jersey in the grand final against South Africa under-21, who were the winning side 24–21 in Johannesburg. He was part of the Eastwood Rugby Club winning side in the 2002 Shute Shield, where he was named man-of-the match in the 19–15 win over Sydney University.

=== 2005 – Debut Super Rugby season ===
In 2005, Hodgson was a member of the Australian sevens side that finished seventh in the 2004–05 World Sevens Series. In addition to this, he got his first taste of international rugby, playing for the Australian A side against the Junior All Blacks in Canberra. Furthermore, Hodgson signed with the Western Force, for their inaugural season of Super Rugby. He made his super rugby debut at home, Subiaco Oval, against the Brumbies who were the victors in that match 25–10. At the end of his debut season with the Force, he was awarded the inaugural presentation of the 2006 Force Man award – a recognition given to the player deemed to best represent the club's values in all that they do both on and off the field. This award was again won by Hodgson in 2007, 2009 and in 2010.

=== 2009 – Australia ===
Hodgson enjoyed a break-out season in 2009, earning his first Western Force Player of the Year award and first Wallabies call up. He debuted for Australia in the non-cap earning 55–7 annihilation of the Barbarians at Sydney Football Stadium. A serious AC Joint injury sustained during the 39th minute sidelined Hodgson for 3 months, but he returned for the Spring Tour later that year and performed in the midweek matches against Gloucester and Cardiff Blues.

2010 Super rugby season saw Hodgson awarded his second Player of the Year award in so many years. Hodgson rounded off 2010 with two Man of the Match performances on Wallaby Spring tour against Munster and Leicester.

Hodgson's first test cap was a substitution from the bench in the 49–3 victory against Fiji in Canberra, during the 2010 mid-year rugby union internationals. He also made appearances from the bench in tests against England, New Zealand and Italy during the 2010 season. He earned his first starting position against Samoa in Sydney during the 2011 mid-year rugby union internationals. On that occasion Samoa won 32–23 in a shock victory.

Hodgson was a member of the 2011 World Cup Squad, called up as an injury replacement for Wycliff Palu.

Hodgson was contracted until the end of the 2015 Super Rugby Season with the Western Force. Hodgson is managed by the Fordham Company in Sydney.

== Personal life ==
Hodgson is of Aboriginal descent. In 2009, Hodgson graduated with a Bachelor of Exercise Science & Sports Management from Australian Catholic University. In 2011, he completed a Real Estate Sales Agent course. He was reported to be enrolled in the Masters of Business Management (Sports Law) at Deakin University in December 2011. Hodgson was awarded the 2011 RUPA Academic Award.

Hodgson calls Perth home, is married to Jo Hodgson and they have one son (born in 2013).

== Super Rugby statistics ==
As of 15 July 2017

Season	Team	Apps	Start	Sub	Mins	T	C	PG	DG	Pts	YC	RC
2006	Force	12	10	2	839	0	0	0	0	0	0	0
2007	Force	8	5	3	367	0	0	0	0	0	0	0
2008	Force	10	5	5	377	1	0	0	0	5	0	0
2009	Force	13	10	3	886	0	0	0	0	0	0	0
2010	Force	13	13	0	1040	1	0	0	0	5	1	0
2011	Force	13	12	1	889	0	0	0	0	0	0	0
2012	Force	14	14	0	1013	2	0	0	0	10	1	0
2013	Force	14	12	2	964	2	0	0	0	10	0	0
2014	Force	16	16	0	1268	6	0	0	0	30	1	0
2015	Force	7	7	0	550	3	0	0	0	15	1	0
2016	Force	11	11	0	855	2	0	0	0	10	0	0
2017	Force	9	8	1	573	2	0	1	0	10	0	0
Total		140	123	17	9630	19	0	1	0	98	4	0
