= François Steyn =

South African rugby union player

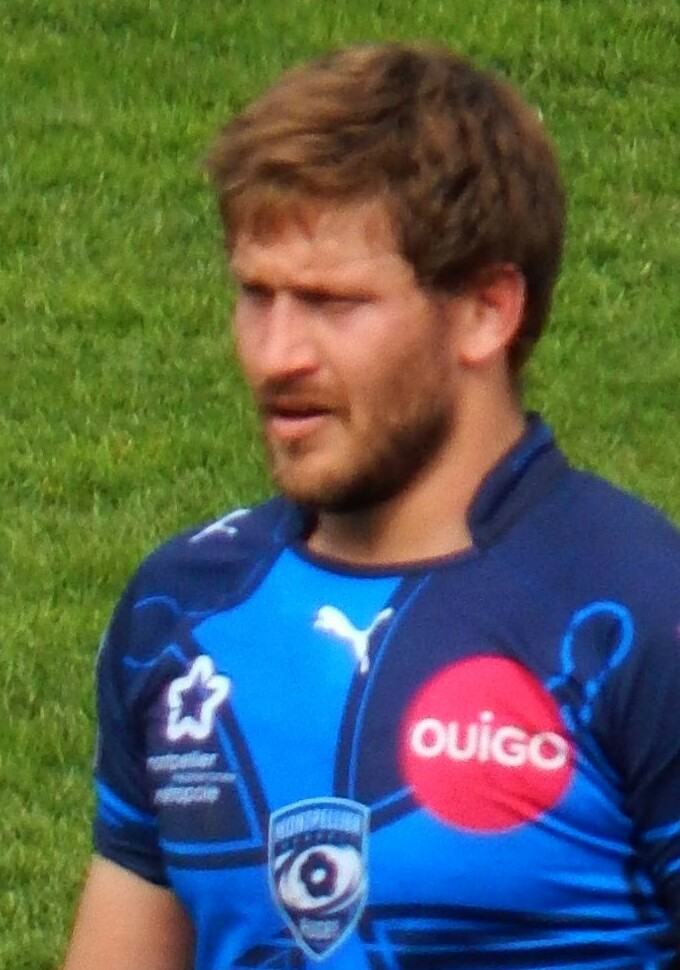
- Steyn playing for Montpellier in 2016
- Born: François Philippus Lodewyk Steyn; 14 May 1987 (age 39) Aliwal North, South Africa
- Height: 1.91 m (6 ft 3 in)
- Weight: 110 kg (240 lb; 17 st 5 lb)
- School: Grey College, Bloemfontein

Rugby union career
- Position(s): Centre, Fly-half, Full-back, Wing
Youth career
- 2004: South Africa U18
Senior career
Years	Team	Apps	(Points)
2009–2012	Racing Métro 92	59	(159)
2014–2015	Toshiba Brave Lupus	11	(47)
2015–2016	Toshiba Brave Lupus	10	(65)
2016–2020	Montpellier	102	(228)
2020–2022	Cheetahs	1	(0)
Provincial / State sides
Years	Team	Apps	(Points)
2006–2009	Sharks	18	(70)
2013	Sharks	2	(0)
2021–2023	Free State Cheetahs	18	(87)
Super Rugby
Years	Team	Apps	(Points)
2007–2009	Sharks	38	(78)
2012–2014	Sharks	30	(167)
2015	Sharks	7	(38)
2020	Cheetahs	5	(0)
International career
Years	Team	Apps	(Points)
2005–2006	South Africa U19	10	(64)
2006–2014	Springbok XV	3	(9)
2006–2022	South Africa	78	(168)
2007–2014	Barbarians	2	(0)
Coaching career
- Years: Team
- 2025-: Cheetahs
Medal record
Men's Rugby Union
Representing South Africa
Rugby World Cup
Gold medal – first place	2007 France	Squad
Gold medal – first place	2019 Japan	Squad

François Philippus Lodewyk Steyn (born 14 May 1987) is a South African rugby union coach and former player. A utility back who represented his country, he was able to play as a centre, fly-half, full-back and wing. He is currently the Head Coach of the Free State Cheetahs in the Currie Cup.

Nicknamed "Daddy Frans", Steyn started his professional career with the Sharks at the age of 19 and made his Super 14 debut in 2007, before moving to France and joining Top 14 club Racing Métro 92 in 2009. He returned to the Sharks in 2012 and then spent a two years stint in Japan, playing for Toshiba Brave Lupus from 2014 to 2016. Montpellier signed him after his departure from Tokyo and he stayed with the French side for four seasons, before returning to South Africa and signing for the Cheetahs in 2020, where he retired three years later.

Having played 78 matches for the Springboks, Steyn won the World Cup on two occasions in 2007 and 2019, and is the second South African player to have won the tournament twice, as well as the youngest World Champion in the history. He also won The Rugby Championship (previously named Tri Nations) twice. A powerful and versatile player, Steyn was particularly renowned for his long distance kicking ability and strong tackling.

== Club career ==
=== Sharks ===
In his debut season of Super 14 rugby for the Sharks, Steyn played on the right wing, however, was moved to fullback when Percy Montgomery was injured. He played as the last line of defence until Percy Montgomery returned for the game against the Blues in Round 11, and was moved to fly-half for this game.

=== Racing Métro 92 ===
In 2009, Steyn signed a two-year contract with French Top 14 club Racing Métro 92 for an estimated wage of €750,000 per season.

=== Sharks ===
Steyn then rejoined the Sharks by signing a three-year deal on 29 May 2012. Steyn was not available to them for the knock-outs due to his late entry into the squad and didn't play when the Sharks lost in the final to the Chiefs.

The player made his return for the Sharks in the 2013 Super Rugby competition, captaining the side in the first few matches in the absence of regular skipper, Keegan Daniel. Steyn struggled with form early on in Super Rugby, but as the season progressed, he began to regain the form that first earned him Springbok honours. Once again though, Steyn was injured in the Sharks league match against the Highlanders in Dunedin, which they lost. Steyn would have to wait until the Currie Cup semi-final of 2013 against the Free State Cheetahs to make his next appearance. He was subbed early on in the match, but was again selected for the final against DHL Western Province. Steyn's contributions on attack were good, but it was his immense defense that really marked his successful comeback, and helped the Sharks to Currie Cup victory in 2013. After only 2 matches back, Steyn was not selected for the Springbok end of year tour in 2013.

=== Toshiba Brave Lupus ===
On 3 June 2014 Steyn signed a two-year deal with Japanese club Toshiba Brave Lupus.

=== Montpellier ===
In 2016, Steyn joined French club Montpellier. In his time with the Top 14 side, he won the European Rugby Challenge Cup in 2016 and played the 2017–18 Top 14 final but lost as Montpellier ended as runners-up.

=== Cheetahs and retirement ===
After four seasons in the south of France, Steyn returned to South Africa and joined the Cheetahs on 1 July 2020. He made his debut on 10 October in a Super Rugby Unlocked match against the Pumas in Bloemfontein.

On 24 March 2023, he came off sustaining a knee injury in a Currie Cup Premier Division fixture against the Blue Bulls and was ruled out for the rest of the competition that his team won two months later. In July, he announced his retirement from professional rugby at the age of 36 and renounced taking part in the Rugby Championship and the World Cup in France.

== International career ==
Steyn before a South Africa match in 2008

After playing only ten matches for the Sharks in the 2006 Currie Cup Premier Division (at fly-half), Steyn was, at 19 years old, selected to represent South Africa in the Northern Hemisphere touring squad by national coach Jake White. He debuted at wing against Ireland, he scored a try on his debut. In his next international match he was moved to fullback against England, scoring a long range drop-goal, from his own half. Steyn has shown to possess superb goal kicking qualities as well.

Steyn kicked two drop goals in the 2007 Tri Nations opener against Australia at Newlands Stadium in Cape Town, to win the game for the Springboks. One of these, a 42-metre effort from a fielded clearance kick next to the sideline, and another three minutes from time next to the posts about 30 metres out.

In South Africa's first game at the 2007 Rugby World Cup, their centre Jean de Villiers got injured. Steyn replaced him, playing only his second game at professional level at inside centre, but he made a break on first touch of the ball and his inclusion sparked the Springboks to a 37–0 second half demolition of Samoa.

On 24 September 2007 Steyn was cited to appear before a disciplinary hearing for allegedly biting Tongan winger Joseph Vaka during the Springboks v. Tonga 2007 Rugby World Cup game on 22 September. (Match report). Both players were sent to the sinbin in the 60th minute for an off-the-ball incident. He was subsequently cleared of the charge, due to insufficient evidence and Vaka conceding that the apparent "bite mark" could have been received during normal play.

Steyn was the starting inside centre for the Springboks in the 2007 Rugby World Cup Final, he made a fantastic break that resulted in a penalty for the Boks and also converted one himself later on in the game. He is therefore the youngest player to win a Rugby World Cup.

In the Springboks' final match of the 2009 Tri Nations against New Zealand, his last match with the Boks before his departure for France, he converted three penalties from within his own half of the field; he is believed to be the first player ever to do so in a Test match.

Reaching his 50th test cap against Argentina in Cape Town in 2012, Steyn is the youngest South African to reach the milestone. Steyn was injured during the 2012 Rugby Championship, missing the final 2 matches, along with the Currie Cup, and the end of year tour to the UK.

Steyn was re-called for South Africa for the 2017 series against France due to the injuries of Pat Lambie and Handre Pollard, after a 3-year absence from international rugby.

In 2019, Steyn was again called up as part of the South African team to play in the 2019 Rugby World Cup in Japan and became one of the 21 players to have won the trophy on two occasions, and only the second South African to do so.

== Honours ==
Sharks

- Super 14
  - (silver) Runner-up (2): 2007

Sharks

- Currie Cup
  - (gold) Winner (2): 2008, 2013

Montpellier

- European Rugby Challenge Cup
  - (gold) Winner (1): 2015-16
- Top 14
  - (silver) Runner-up (1): 2017-18

Free State Cheetahs

- Currie Cup
  - (gold) Winner (1): 2023

South Africa

- Rugby World Cup
  - (gold) Winner (2): 2007, 2019
- Tri Nations/The Rugby Championship
  - (gold) Winner (2): 2009, 2019
  - (silver) Runner-up (1): 2022
