= Pete Bucknall =

English rugby union player (born 1982)

- Born: Peter Bucknall; 24 August 1982 (age 44) Enfield, England
- Height: 1.85 m (6 ft 1 in)
- Weight: 110 kg (17 st 5 lb; 243 lb)

Rugby union career
- Position: Prop
- Current team: Leicester Tigers
Senior career
Years	Team	Apps	(Points)
2008–2010	Leeds Carnegie		
2010–	Leicester Tigers		

Pete Bucknall (born 24 August 1982) is an English professional rugby union player. His primary position is prop.

Bucknall has previously played for Birmingham & Solihull R.F.C. (2007–08), Coventry R.F.C. (2005–07), and Bracknell (2004–05). He played for Leeds Carnegie from 2008 to 2010 in both National Division One and when they got promoted to the Guinness Premiership, though he underwent a knee operation in February 2009, which put him out of action for some months.

Leicester Tigers signed him for the 2010–11 season.

In 2026 he became the headteacher of The Kingsley School in Leamington Spa.
