= Richie Rees =

- Born: Richard Scott Rees; 21 May 1983 (age 43) Swansea, Wales
- Height: 1.76 m (5 ft 9 in)
- Weight: 82 kg (12 st 13 lb; 181 lb)
- School: Olchfa School; Swansea College
- University: UWIC; Cardiff University

Rugby union career
- Position: Scrum-half
Amateur team(s)
Years	Team	Apps	(Points)
- Dunvant RFC
Senior career
Years	Team	Apps	(Points)
2003–06	Swansea RFC	52	(60)
2004–06	Ospreys	16	(10)
2006–07	London Irish	19	(10)
2007–12	Cardiff Blues	100	(30)
2012–13	Edinburgh	23	(0)
2013–15	Newport Gwent Dragons	48	(45)
International career
Years	Team	Apps	(Points)
?	Wales U21		
2010 - 2015	Wales	9	(5)
Coaching career
- Years: Team
- 2018-2024: Cardiff Rugby (Academy -> Attack Coach)

Richie Rees (born 21 May 1983) is a Welsh former international professional rugby union player. He played as a scrum-half. He is now the attack coach for Cardiff Rugby.

== Club ==
Rees started his rugby career at Dunvant RFC. He then played for the Ospreys regional team in Wales for two years, winning the Celtic League in the 04/05 season. He then joined London Irish. In 2007 he returned to Wales when he signed for the Cardiff Blues going on to win the EDF Energy Cup in the 08/09 season and the Amlin Challenge Cup in 09/10. Rees gained his one hundredth cap for the Cardiff Blues, playing against the Scarlets at Parc Y Scarlets on 5 May 2012. In March 2012, Rees announced that he was leaving the Cardiff Blues for Edinburgh Rugby. In March 2013 it was announced Rees would join Newport Gwent Dragons on a 2-year deal for the 2013–14 season.

== International ==
On 18 January 2010 he was named in the 35 man Wales national Squad for the 2010 Six Nations tournament. Rees made his international debut against England on 6 February 2010 as a second-half replacement and scored his first International try versus Australia in the 2010 Autumn series.

Rees made his debut for the Barbarians versus Ireland on 29 May 2012, one week later he scored versus his home nation of Wales on 2 June 2012.

== Honours ==
- Celtic League 2004–05
- EDF Energy Cup 2008–09
- Amlin Challenge Cup 2009–10
