= Peter Hynes (rugby union) =

- Born: Peter Hynes; 18 July 1982 (age 44) Brisbane, Queensland, Australia
- Height: 1.8 m (5 ft 11 in)
- Weight: 92 kg (14 st 7 lb)
- School: Brisbane State High School; St Laurence's College

Rugby union career
- Position(s): Wing, Fullback
Senior career
Years	Team	Apps	(Points)
2001-2012	University of Queensland		
2007	Ballymore Tornadoes	6	(0)
Provincial / State sides
Years	Team	Apps	(Points)
2003-2012	Queensland Reds	10	(5)
2001	Queensland U-19		
Super Rugby
Years	Team	Apps	(Points)
2003–2012	Queensland Reds	75	(95)
International career
Years	Team	Apps	(Points)
2008–2009	Wallabies	22	(20)
2003	Australia A		
2002–2003	Australia U-21		
2001	Australia U-19		
2000	Australia Schoolboys		
National sevens team
Years	Team		Comps
2002	Australia Sevens		

Peter Hynes (born 18 July 1982) is a retired Australian professional rugby union footballer. He played on the wing or at fullback for the Queensland Reds and Australia.

== Early life ==
Born and raised in Brisbane, Hynes attended Brisbane State High School, and formally St Laurence's college where he was a schoolboy 400m sprint champion and was selected to play for the Australian Schoolboys rugby team in 2000.

Hynes played for the University of Queensland Rugby Club, and was invited to join the Queensland Reds Rugby College in 2001.

== Rugby career ==
Hynes was chosen for the Queensland Under 19s and went on to play for Australia at the Under 19 World Cup in Chile in 2001. He was selected for the Australian Sevens team in 2002, and he played for Australia Under 21s two years in a row at the Under 21 Rugby World Championships in 2002 and 2003.

=== 2003–2007 ===
Hynes signed a contract with the Queensland Reds for the 2003 season, and made his Super 12 debut for the Reds against the Hurricanes on 4 April 2003. He was selected to tour with Australia A and played in the two matches against Japan at Osaka and Tokyo in June 2003.

On 8 May 2004, in a match against the Waratahs, Hynes scored the first ever Reds try at Suncorp Stadium in front of a record Australian Super 12 crowd.

Hynes earned his 20th Super Rugby cap in 2005, the last season of the Super 12 before the competition expanded to 14 teams. It was the middle of several lean years for the Queensland team and the backline players being starved of possession under a 10-man rugby gameplan was frustrating for Hynes.

In November 2006, Hynes played for the Australian Prime Minister's XV against Japan in Tokyo, scoring the opening try in a 61-19 thrashing of the home side.

Hynes notched up his 50th game for the Reds in 2007, a year where his versatility was put to the test, playing at wing and inside centre after some trial games at flyhalf. Later in 2007, he played six matches for the Ballymore Tornadoes in the Australian Rugby Championship.

=== 2008–2011 ===
Phil Mooney was installed as the Reds' coach in 2008, and brought in a new gameplan that encouraged instinct and flair. Hynes had his best year for the Reds, scoring several spectacular tries in 2008, including an 80-metre solo effort against the Lions in Johannesburg. His punishing defence was also outstanding.

Hynes made his Test debut for the Wallabies as one of the two run-on wingers against Ireland in Melbourne on 14 June 2008. He had a very strong game and won the Player's Player award for the match against Ireland. Two weeks later, he went on to win the Man of the Match award in the first Test against France on 28 June 2008. In the second Test against France on 5 July 2008, Hynes scored his first try for the Wallabies in front of his home crowd at Suncorp Stadium in Brisbane. After playing in all six Test matches in the 2008 Tri Nations Series, Hynes received the Wallabies Rookie of the Year award, and toured with the Wallabies on the 2008 Spring tour.

Hynes had an injury-affected campaign in 2009 and played 8 matches in the Super 14 season for the Reds. He never shook off lingering knee problems, even after a mid-season arthroscopic operation, He nevertheless returned to play for the Wallabies with a win against Italy in Melbourne on 20 July 2009. He played in the 2009 Tri Nations Series and on the 2009 Spring tour, and extended his number of Test caps to 22.

Throughout 2010, Hynes battled a degenerative condition in his left knee, in which the cartilage was gradually being worn away. He played 12 matches in the Super 14 season for the Reds, and had another arthroscopic operation at the end of the season to clear out the debris. He played two matches for the Australian Barbarians against England in June 2010, but had lost top-end speed and did not make much impact. He did not gain reselection for the Wallabies.

Hynes entered the 2011 season with severe bone bruising in his left knee resulting from the cartilage degeneration and was forced to miss all but the opening two matches of the Reds 2011 Super Rugby title-winning season.

== Retirement and post-rugby career ==
After many months of treatment in 2011, Hynes decided to undergo a radical surgery to guarantee he wouldn't experience severe pain or have any limitations in his knee later in life. The innovative surgery involved a posterior cruciate ligament reconstruction; a high tibia Osteotomy, whereby his leg was broken and re-aligned; and a donor meniscus transfer.

During his rehabilitation, Hynes worked for the Queensland Rugby Commercial Team as a Business Development Executive. Hynes retired from rugby in 2012, and took up a business development career with TechnologyOne, an international corporation based in Brisbane.
