= Will Genia =

Australian rugby union player (born 1988)

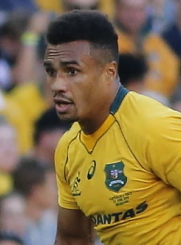
- Born: Sanchez William Genia; 17 January 1988 (age 38) Port Moresby, Papua New Guinea
- Height: 174 cm (5 ft 9 in)
- Weight: 81 kg (12 st 11 lb; 179 lb)
- School: Brisbane Boys' College

Rugby union career
- Position: Scrum-half
Senior career
Years	Team	Apps	(Points)
2007	Ballymore Tornadoes	6	(5)
2014–2015	Brisbane City	3	(5)
2015–2017	Stade Français	21	(10)
2019–2025	Kintetsu Liners	62	(155)
Super Rugby
Years	Team	Apps	(Points)
2007–2015	Reds	114	(90)
2018–2019	Rebels	23	(30)
- Correct as of 16 June 2019
International career
Years	Team	Apps	(Points)
2005	Australia Schoolboys		
2006	Australia U19		
2008	Australia U20		
2009–2019	Australia	110	(90)
- Correct as of 1 November 2019
Coaching career
- Years: Team
- 2025–2026: Kintetsu Liners (skills coach)
Medal record
Men's rugby union
Representing Australia
Rugby World Cup
Silver medal – second place	2015 England	Squad
Bronze medal – third place	2011 New Zealand	Squad

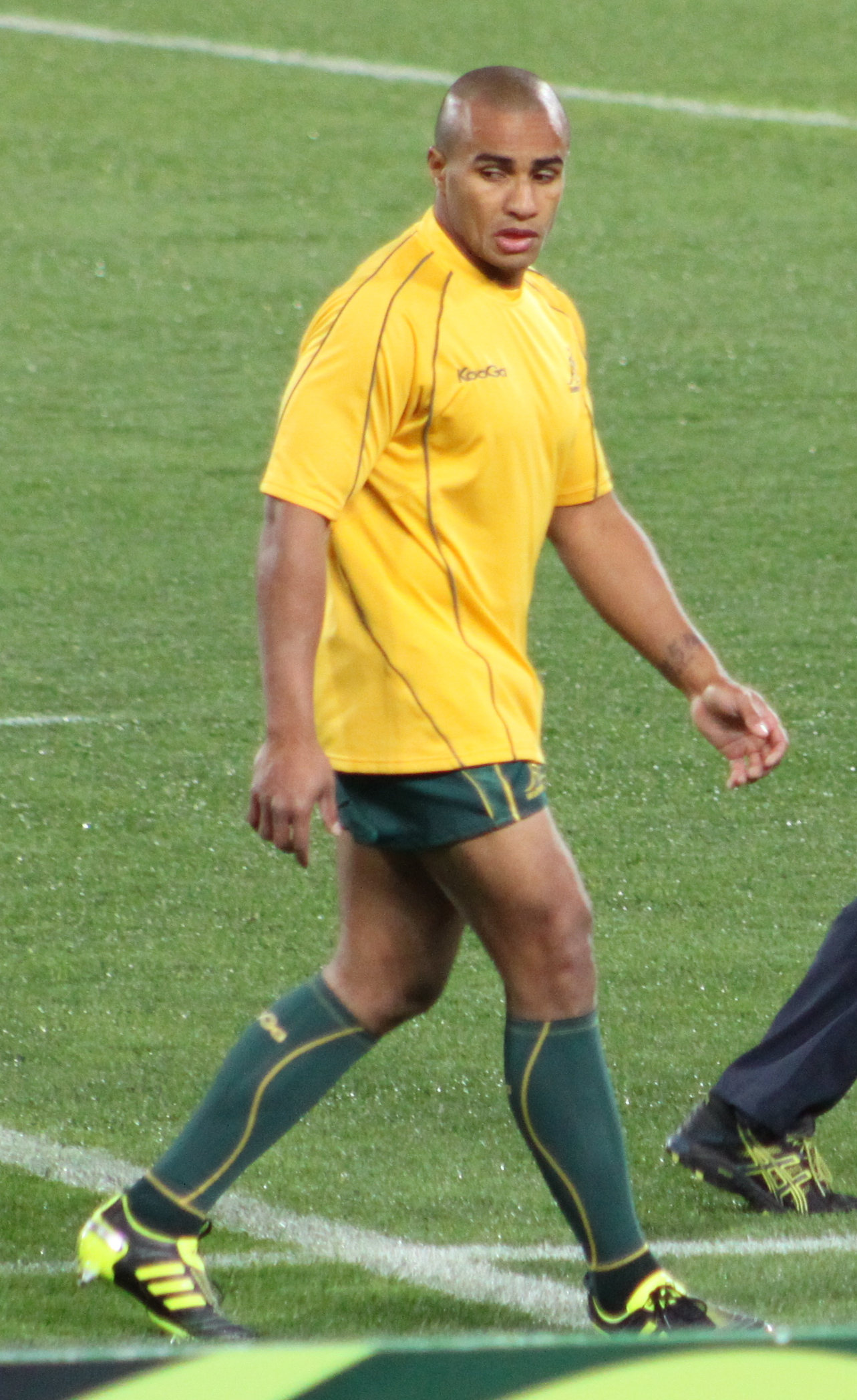
Genia before World Cup match against USA.

Sanchez William Genia (born 17 January 1988) is an Australian professional rugby union coach and former player. Genia's playing position was scrum-half. He had previously played in the Super Rugby for the Queensland Reds (2007–2015) and Melbourne Rebels (2018–2019), and finished his career for the Kintetsu Liners in Japan. He also had previously played for Stade Français in France's Top 14 from 2015 to 2017.

Born in Port Moresby, Papua New Guinea, he played for Australia at international level from 2009 to 2019. Genia made his Test debut against New Zealand and went on to earn 110 international caps. Once a nominee for the World Rugby Men's Player of the Year, Genia has been called "the best in the world for his position" former New Zealand scrum-half Justin Marshall.

== Family and early life ==
Genia was born in Port Moresby, Papua New Guinea. He was introduced to rugby union when he moved to Brisbane, Queensland, Australia at the age of 12 for his secondary education at Brisbane Boys' College (BBC), boarding at the school from 2000 to 2005. Genia played rugby for the Australia 'A' Schoolboys team in 2005, and was part of the Australian Under 19 rugby team that won the IRB World Championship in 2006.

Genia's Papua New Guinean father, Kilroy Genia, is a former Cabinet Minister in the Papua New Guinean government. His Australian mother, Elizabeth Genia, was appointed assistant governor and later Governor at the Bank of Papua New Guinea in 2011. His older brother, Frank Genia, plays international rugby union for Papua New Guinea Pukpuks .

Despite playing 110 Tests for Australia and having lived in Australia since he was 12, Genia did not hold Australian citizenship, owing to him playing professional rugby union overseas and the legal requirement for applicants to not have been absent from the country for more than 12 months in total in the four-year period, including no more than 90 days in total in the 12-month period prior to application. In 2024 Genia received Australian citizenship.

== Rugby union career ==
Genia was recruited to the Queensland Reds from the GPS club at the end of 2006 before their tour to Japan and obtained his first state cap for the Reds playing against Japan.

=== 2007–2010 ===
Genia made his Super 14 debut for the Reds as a 19-year-old against the Hurricanes at Suncorp Stadium in Brisbane on 3 February 2007. He shared the scrum half position with starting halfback Nic Berry for most of the season, appearing in 11 of 13 matches for the Reds during the season. Later in 2007, Genia played for the Ballymore Tornadoes in the Australian Rugby Championship, appearing in all 8 games played by the team for the year.

In 2008, Genia added a further seven Super Rugby Caps (although only one starting) for the Reds. He was selected as the first choice scrumhalf for the Australian Under 20 team for the 2008 IRB Junior World Cup in Wales.

Genia played in eight Super Rugby matches in 2009, half of which were starting appearances, and scored four tries during the tournament but missed Queensland's final two matches of the season due to an injured finger tendon.

Genia was selected in the Wallabies squad for the 2009 Tri Nations and made his test debut against the All Blacks at Eden Park in Auckland on 18 July 2009. He came off the bench in the first four matches before getting starting berths against the Springboks in Brisbane, and against the All Blacks in Wellington. Genia then started in all five Tests of Australia's Spring Tour of Japan and Europe, before staying on at the tour's end to help the Barbarians beat the All Blacks at Twickenham.

In 2010, Genia captained the Reds after regular captain James Horwill suffered an injury in the second match of the season. At the end of the season, Genia was voted by his teammates as the 2010 players' player of the year and he won the Pilecki Medal. He was also voted the fans' player of the year, winning the People's Choice award.

=== 2011–present ===
Genia won the Pilecki Medal again in 2011, and was voted the Australian Super Rugby Player of the Year by Australian rugby writers. He became the 78th Test captain of the Wallabies when he led the side against the United States at the 2011 Rugby World Cup. He was one of two Australian nominees, alongside David Pocock, for the 2011 IRB Player of the Year award.

In April 2012, he signed a new three-year deal with the Reds after turning down a lucrative offer from the Force. In early September Genia suffered a knee injury in Australia's win over South Africa. Genia missed eight Tests in a row and didn't expect to return to domestic action until the Reds play the Bulls in Brisbane on 23 March 2013.

It was rumoured that Genia was leaving Australia after the 2015 Rugby World Cup, possibly going to the English Club Bath, but he left Australia at the start of the 2015–16 season to play for Stade Français.

On 15 August 2017, Genia signed with the Melbourne Rebels for the 2018 and 2019 Super Rugby seasons.

On 24 November 2018, Genia became just the 10th Wallaby and the second Wallabies halfback after George Gregan to play 100-Tests for Australia; playing against England at London's Twickenham Stadium.

On 12 July 2019, Genia announced his test rugby retirement, stating that he will not play for the Wallabies after the 2019 Rugby World Cup, having signed to play for Kintetsu Liners in Japan. After several seasons with the Liners, Genia retired from professional rugby and took up a role as skills coach with the Kintetsu Liners alongside teammate Quade Cooper. Having been in the role since 2025, Genia stood down from the role at the end of the 2025–26 season.

In April 2026, taking inspiration from the Moana Pasifika axing from Super Rugby, Genia said he was open to working with the Papua New Guinea Chiefs, the National Rugby League's 2028 expansion team. Genia, whom was born in Papua New Guinea, is a dual citizen of Australia and Papua New Guinea, and is said to retain deep connections to the country. In late 2026 Genia joined the Lebanon Rugby League team as a specialist skills coach for their Rugby League World Cup campaign.

== Super Rugby statistics ==
As of 16 June 2019

Season	Team	Games	Starts	Sub	Mins	Tries	Cons	Pens	Drops	Points	Yel	Red
2007	Reds	10	2	8	241	1	0	0	0	5	0	0
2008	Reds	7	1	6	246	0	0	0	0	0	0	0
2009	Reds	8	4	4	396	4	0	0	0	20	0	0
2010	Reds	13	13	0	1030	2	0	1	0	13	0	0
2011	Reds	18	18	0	1433	4	0	0	0	20	0	0
2012	Reds	17	17	0	1360	4	1	0	0	22	0	0
2013	Reds	12	12	0	906	1	0	0	0	5	0	0
2014	Reds	13	13	0	981	1	1	0	0	7	0	0
2015	Reds	16	16	0	1269	1	0	0	0	5	0	0
2018	Rebels	9	9	0	568	1	0	0	0	5	0	0
2019	Rebels	14	14	0	1014	5	0	0	0	25	0	0
Total		137	119	18	9444	24	2	1	0	127	0	0

== Outside rugby ==
Genia is an ambassador for The Kokoda Track Foundation.

== Honours ==
- Queensland Reds
  - Super Rugby: 2011
  - Super Rugby Centurion
- Australia
  - Tri-Nations: 2011
  - The Rugby Championship: 2015
  - Wallabies Captain 2011-2013
  - Test Rugby Centurion

== Reference list ==
Preceded by James Horwill	Australian national rugby union captain 2011–2013	Succeeded by David Pocock
