= Luke Burgess (rugby union) =

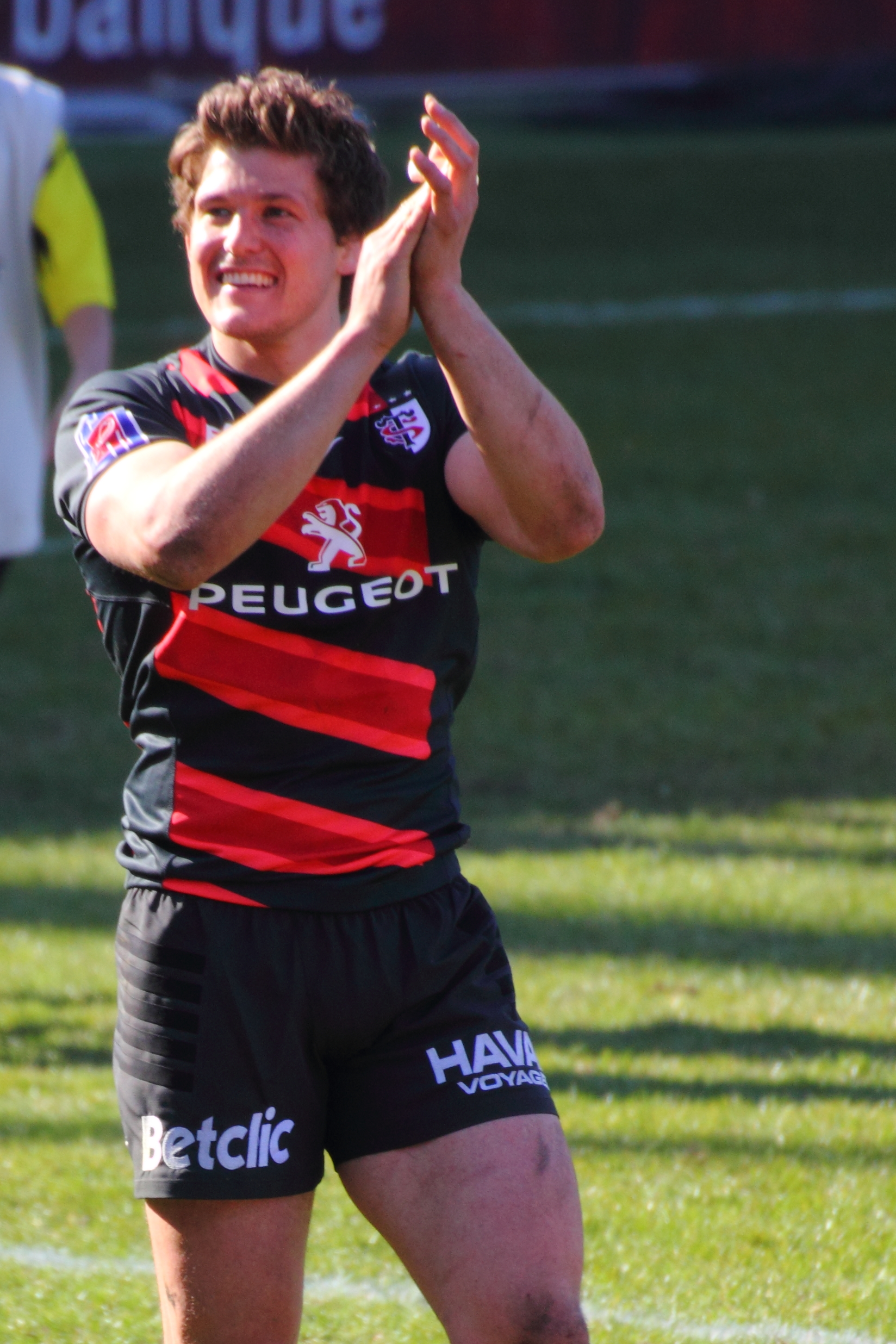
- Burgess in 2012
- Full name: Luke Burgess
- Born: 20 August 1983 (age 43) Newcastle, New South Wales, Australia
- Height: 179 cm (5 ft 10 in)
- Weight: 89 kg (14 st 0 lb; 196 lb)
- School: St Joseph's College, Hunters Hill

Rugby union career
- Position: Scrum-half
- Current team: Rebels
Senior career
Years	Team	Apps	(Points)
2003–07	Brumbies	2	(0)
2007	Melbourne Rebels (ARC)	9	(15)
2008–11	Waratahs	56	(20)
2011–13	Stade Toulousain	54	(20)
2013–15	Rebels	26	(25)
2014	Melbourne Rising	5	(10)
2015−16	Zebre	25	(5)
- Correct as of 14 June 2015
International career
Years	Team	Apps	(Points)
2008–2015	Australia	37	(5)
- Correct as of 7 June 2013
Medal record
Men's rugby union
Representing Australia
Rugby World Cup
Bronze medal – third place	2011 New Zealand	Squad

Luke Burgess (born 20 August 1984) is a retired professional rugby union player. His usual position was scrum-half. He represented Australia on 37 occasions.

== Early career ==
Burgess was born in Newcastle, New South Wales. He was educated at St Joseph's College, Hunters Hill. He played his club rugby with Sydney University Colts and Eastern Suburbs RUFC in Sydney.

== Professional career ==
He played with the Brumbies from 2003 to 2007, but due to the presence of Wallaby captain George Gregan, he only made two appearances for the team, making his Super 12 debut in 2005. In 2007, he played for the Melbourne Rebels in the now defunct Australian Rugby Championship.

Burgess joined the NSW Waratahs in 2008, and made his first Super 14 appearance off the bench mid-year. Later that year he made his Test debut for the Wallabies against Ireland at the Telstra Dome, Melbourne. A knee injury kept him out of the 2008 Tri Nations Series, but he was selected for the Wallabies end 2008 Spring Tour.

From 2011, Burgess played for Stade Toulousain in the Top 14 championship, France, making his debut in the Heineken Cup match against Gloucester.

He joined the Melbourne Rebels for the start of the 2014 Super Rugby season.

In 2015, he moved to Italy to play for Zebre and announced his retirement from professional rugby in May 2016.
