= 2010 Six Nations Championship squads =

Rugby union competition squads

This is a list of the complete squads for the 2010 Six Nations Championship, an annual rugby union tournament contested by the national rugby teams of England, France, Ireland, Italy, Scotland and Wales. Each country was entitled to name a squad of 39 players to contest the championship. They could also invite additional players along prior to the start of the championship while the coach could call up replacement players if squad members suffered serious injury.

All caps are as of the start of the tournament, and do not include appearances made during the competition.

== England ==
Martin Johnson named a revised 32-man England squad for the 2010 Six Nations Championship. On 25 January, Cole, Mullan, Robshaw, Ward-Smith and Youngs were promoted to Senior EPS to provide injury cover for other players. Jamie Noon was called up to replace Dan Hipkiss due to injury ahead of the Ireland game, while Charlie Hodgson was brought in to provide cover. Ahead of the Scotland game, Fourie, Tindall, Morgan and Geraghty were called up to the squad.

- Caps updated before the 2010 Six Nations Championship.

Head coach: Martin Johnson

Note: Flags indicate national union for the club/province as defined by World Rugby.

Player	Position	Date of birth (age)	Caps	Club/province
Dylan Hartley	Hooker	24 March 1986 (aged 23)	14	(England) Northampton Saints
Lee Mears	Hooker	5 March 1979 (aged 30)	34	(England) Bath
Steve Thompson	Hooker	15 July 1978 (age 48)	51	(France) Brive
Dan Cole	Prop	9 May 1987 (age 39)	0	(England) Leicester Tigers
Matt Mullan	Prop	23 February 1987 (age 39)	0	(England) Worcester Warriors
Tim Payne	Prop	29 April 1979 (age 47)	15	(England) London Wasps
Andrew Sheridan	Prop	1 November 1979 (age 47)	32	(England) Sale Sharks
Julian White	Prop	14 May 1973 (age 53)	51	(England) Leicester Tigers
David Wilson	Prop	9 April 1985 (age 41)	4	(England) Bath
Steve Borthwick (c)	Lock	12 October 1979 (age 47)	53	(England) Saracens
Louis Deacon	Lock	7 October 1980 (age 46)	13	(England) Leicester Tigers
Courtney Lawes	Lock	23 February 1989 (age 37)	1	(England) Northampton Saints
Tom Palmer	Lock	27 March 1979 (age 47)	13	(France) Stade Français
Simon Shaw	Lock	1 September 1973 (age 53)	54	(England) London Wasps
Steffon Armitage	Flanker	20 September 1985 (age 41)	3	(England) London Irish
Tom Croft	Flanker	7 November 1985 (age 41)	16	(England) Leicester Tigers
Hendre Fourie	Flanker	3 July 1979 (age 47)	0	(England) Leeds Carnegie
James Haskell	Flanker	2 April 1985 (age 41)	22	(France) Stade Français
Lewis Moody (vc)	Flanker	12 June 1978 (age 48)	56	(England) Leicester Tigers
Chris Robshaw	Flanker	4 June 1986 (age 40)	1	(England) Harlequins
Joe Worsley	Flanker	14 June 1977 (age 49)	74	(England) London Wasps
Jordan Crane	Number 8	3 June 1986 (age 40)	3	(England) Leicester Tigers
Nick Easter	Number 8	15 August 1978 (age 48)	27	(England) Harlequins
Dan Ward-Smith	Number 8	2 January 1978 (age 48)	0	(England) London Wasps
Danny Care	Scrum-half	2 January 1987 (age 39)	14	(England) Harlequins
Harry Ellis	Scrum-half	17 May 1982 (age 44)	27	(England) Leicester Tigers
Paul Hodgson	Scrum-half	25 April 1982 (age 44)	6	(England) London Irish
Ben Youngs	Scrum-half	5 September 1989 (age 37)	0	(England) Leicester Tigers
Toby Flood	Fly-half	8 August 1985 (age 41)	26	(England) Leicester Tigers
Shane Geraghty	Fly-half	12 August 1986 (age 40)	6	(England) Northampton Saints
Charlie Hodgson	Fly-half	12 November 1980 (age 46)	31	(England) Sale Sharks
Jonny Wilkinson	Fly-half	25 May 1979 (age 47)	73	(France) Toulon
Riki Flutey	Centre	10 February 1980 (age 46)	9	(France) Brive
Shontayne Hape	Centre	30 January 1981 (age 45)	0	(England) Bath
Dan Hipkiss	Centre	4 June 1982 (age 44)	12	(England) Leicester Tigers
Jamie Noon	Centre	9 May 1979 (age 47)	38	(France) Brive
Mathew Tait	Centre	6 February 1986 (age 40)	32	(England) Sale Sharks
Mike Tindall	Centre	18 October 1978 (age 48)	60	(England) Gloucester
Chris Ashton	Wing	29 March 1987 (age 39)	0	(England) Northampton Saints
Matt Banahan	Wing	30 December 1986 (age 39)	5	(England) Bath
Mark Cueto	Wing	26 December 1979 (age 46)	34	(England) Sale Sharks
Ugo Monye	Wing	13 April 1983 (age 43)	9	(England) Harlequins
Delon Armitage	Fullback	15 December 1983 (age 42)	11	(England) London Irish
Ben Foden	Fullback	22 July 1985 (age 41)	1	(England) Northampton Saints
Olly Morgan	Fullback	3 November 1985 (age 41)	2	(England) Gloucester

== France ==
Marc Lièvremont announced France's squad for the 2010 Six Nations on 20 January. Julien Pierre was called up to the squad as an injury replacement for the Scotland game, as was Yoann Maestri. Jean-Baptiste Élissalde was also ruled out of the clash against Scotland, Michalak was called up to replace him. With Luc Ducalcon ruled out of the game against Ireland, Jean-Baptiste Poux was called up to replace him. Sylvain Marconnet was ruled out of the game against Wales and was replaced by the uncapped Clement Baiocco. Fall was replaced by Marc Andreu for the Wales game. After Michalak tore his cruciate knee ligaments in a club game, Dimitri Yachvili was called up to replace him.

- Caps updated before the 2010 Six Nations Championship.

Head coach: Marc Lièvremont

Note: Flags indicate national union for the club/province as defined by World Rugby.

Player	Position	Date of birth (age)	Caps	Club/province
William Servat	Hooker	9 February 1978 (age 48)	25	(France) Toulouse
Dimitri Szarzewski	Hooker	26 January 1983 (age 43)	41	(France) Stade Français
Clément Baïocco	Prop	3 December 1979 (age 46)	0	(France) Racing Métro
Thomas Domingo	Prop	20 August 1985 (age 41)	5	(France) Clermont
Luc Ducalcon	Prop	2 January 1984 (age 42)	0	(France) Castres
Sylvain Marconnet	Prop	8 April 1976 (age 50)	79	(France) Stade Français
Nicolas Mas	Prop	23 May 1980 (age 46)	30	(France) Perpignan
Jean-Baptiste Poux	Prop	26 September 1979 (age 47)	23	(France) Toulouse
Sébastien Chabal	Lock	8 December 1977 (age 48)	52	(France) Racing Métro
Yoann Maestri	Lock	14 January 1988 (age 38)	0	(France) Toulouse
Romain Millo-Chluski	Lock	20 April 1983 (age 43)	13	(France) Toulouse
Lionel Nallet	Lock	14 September 1976 (age 50)	49	(France) Racing Métro
Pascal Papé	Lock	5 October 1980 (age 46)	23	(France) Stade Français
Julien Pierre	Lock	31 July 1981 (age 45)	2	(France) Clermont
Julien Bonnaire	Flanker	20 September 1978 (age 48)	47	(France) Clermont
Thierry Dusautoir (c)	Flanker	18 November 1981 (age 45)	28	(France) Toulouse
Alexandre Lapandry	Flanker	13 April 1989 (age 37)	1	(France) Clermont
Fulgence Ouedraogo	Flanker	21 July 1986 (age 40)	18	(France) Montpellier
Imanol Harinordoquy	Number 8	20 February 1980 (age 46)	57	(France) Biarritz
Louis Picamoles	Number 8	5 February 1986 (age 40)	15	(France) Toulouse
Jean-Baptiste Élissalde	Scrum-half	23 November 1977 (age 48)	35	(France) Toulouse
Frédéric Michalak	Scrum-half	16 October 1982 (age 44)	51	(France) Toulouse
Morgan Parra	Scrum-half	15 November 1988 (age 38)	12	(France) Clermont
Dimitri Yachvili	Scrum-half	19 September 1980 (age 46)	41	(France) Biarritz
Benjamin Boyet	Fly-half	8 August 1979 (age 47)	5	(France) Bourgoin
François Trinh-Duc	Fly-half	11 November 1986 (age 40)	15	(France) Montpellier
Mathieu Bastareaud	Centre	17 September 1988 (age 38)	4	(France) Stade Français
Fabrice Estebanez	Centre	26 December 1981 (age 44)	0	(France) Brive
Yannick Jauzion	Centre	28 July 1978 (age 48)	63	(France) Toulouse
David Marty	Centre	30 October 1982 (age 44)	25	(France) Perpignan
Marc Andreu	Wing	27 December 1985 (age 40)	0	(France) Castres
Vincent Clerc	Wing	7 May 1981 (age 45)	39	(France) Toulouse
Benjamin Fall	Wing	29 April 1989 (age 37)	1	(France) Bayonne
Julien Malzieu	Wing	4 May 1983 (age 43)	11	(France) Clermont
Alexis Palisson	Wing	9 September 1987 (age 39)	5	(France) Brive
Aurélien Rougerie	Wing	26 September 1980 (age 46)	55	(France) Clermont
Clément Poitrenaud	Fullback	20 May 1982 (age 44)	34	(France) Toulouse

== Ireland ==
Ireland named their squad for the 2010 Six Nations Championship. Geordan Murphy was called into the Ireland squad for the clash against England after Rob Kearney was ruled out.

- Caps updated before the 2010 Six Nations Championship.

Head coach: Declan Kidney

Note: Flags indicate national union for the club/province as defined by World Rugby.

Player	Position	Date of birth (age)	Caps	Club/province
Rory Best	Hooker	15 August 1982 (age 44)	34	(Ireland) Ulster
Seán Cronin	Hooker	6 May 1986 (age 40)	1	(Ireland) Connacht
Jerry Flannery	Hooker	17 October 1978 (age 48)	34	(Ireland) Munster
John Fogarty	Hooker	18 October 1977 (age 49)	0	(Ireland) Leinster
Tony Buckley	Prop	8 October 1980 (age 46)	14	(Ireland) Munster
Tom Court	Prop	6 November 1980 (age 46)	5	(Ireland) Ulster
Declan Fitzpatrick	Prop	12 July 1983 (age 43)	0	(Ireland) Ulster
John Hayes	Prop	2 November 1973 (age 53)	97	(Ireland) Munster
Cian Healy	Prop	7 October 1987 (age 39)	2	(Ireland) Leinster
Marcus Horan	Prop	7 September 1977 (age 49)	66	(Ireland) Munster
Mike Ross	Prop	21 December 1979 (age 46)	2	(Ireland) Leinster
Brett Wilkinson	Prop	29 November 1983 (age 42)	0	(Ireland) Connacht
Leo Cullen	Lock	9 January 1978 (age 48)	20	(Ireland) Leinster
Donncha O'Callaghan	Lock	24 March 1979 (age 47)	58	(Ireland) Munster
Paul O'Connell (vc)	Lock	20 October 1979 (age 47)	65	(Ireland) Munster
Mick O'Driscoll	Lock	8 October 1978 (age 48)	17	(Ireland) Munster
Donnacha Ryan	Lock	11 December 1983 (age 42)	3	(Ireland) Munster
Devin Toner	Lock	29 June 1986 (age 40)	0	(Ireland) Leinster
Dan Tuohy	Lock	18 June 1985 (age 41)	0	(Ireland) Ulster
Stephen Ferris	Flanker	2 August 1985 (age 41)	16	(Ireland) Ulster
Shane Jennings	Flanker	8 July 1981 (age 45)	5	(Ireland) Leinster
Kevin McLaughlin	Flanker	20 September 1984 (age 42)	0	(Ireland) Leinster
Seán O'Brien	Flanker	14 February 1987 (age 39)	2	(Ireland) Leinster
David Wallace	Flanker	8 July 1976 (age 50)	57	(Ireland) Munster
Jamie Heaslip	Number 8	15 December 1983 (age 42)	21	(Ireland) Leinster
Chris Henry	Number 8	17 October 1984 (age 42)	0	(Ireland) Ulster
Isaac Boss	Scrum-half	9 April 1980 (age 46)	12	(Ireland) Ulster
Tomás O'Leary	Scrum-half	22 October 1983 (age 43)	11	(Ireland) Munster
Eoin Reddan	Scrum-half	20 November 1980 (age 46)	17	(Ireland) Leinster
Peter Stringer	Scrum-half	13 December 1977 (age 48)	91	(Ireland) Munster
Ronan O'Gara	Fly-half	7 March 1977 (age 49)	93	(Ireland) Munster
Johnny Sexton	Fly-half	11 July 1985 (age 41)	2	(Ireland) Leinster
Gordon D'Arcy	Centre	10 February 1980 (age 46)	43	(Ireland) Leinster
Fergus McFadden	Centre	17 June 1986 (age 40)	0	(Ireland) Leinster
Brian O'Driscoll (c)	Centre	21 January 1979 (age 47)	96	(Ireland) Leinster
Paddy Wallace	Centre	27 August 1979 (age 47)	19	(Ireland) Ulster
Tommy Bowe	Wing	22 February 1984 (age 42)	25	(Wales) Ospreys
Ian Dowling	Wing	5 October 1982 (age 44)	2	(Ireland) Munster
Keith Earls	Wing	2 October 1987 (age 39)	5	(Ireland) Munster
Shane Horgan	Wing	18 July 1978 (age 48)	65	(Ireland) Leinster
Johne Murphy	Wing	10 November 1984 (age 42)	0	(England) Leicester Tigers
Andrew Trimble	Wing	20 October 1984 (age 42)	25	(Ireland) Ulster
Denis Hurley	Fullback	15 July 1984 (age 42)	1	(Ireland) Munster
Rob Kearney	Fullback	26 March 1986 (age 40)	19	(Ireland) Leinster
Geordan Murphy	Fullback	19 April 1978 (age 48)	63	(England) Leicester Tigers

== Italy ==
On 7 January 2010 coach Nick Mallett announced a 30-man for the 2010 Six Nations Championship. Canavosio and Bernabo were called up for the clash against England due to injuries to Del Fava and Picone. Paolo Buso was called up to the squad for the Scotland game.

- Caps updated before the 2010 Six Nations Championship.

Head coach: Nick Mallett

Note: Flags indicate national union for the club/province as defined by World Rugby.

Player	Position	Date of birth (age)	Caps	Club/province
Leonardo Ghiraldini (c)	Hooker	26 December 1984 (age 41)	24	(Italy) Benetton Treviso
Fabio Ongaro	Hooker	23 September 1977 (age 49)	64	(England) Saracens
Matías Agüero	Prop	13 February 1981 (age 45)	13	(England) Saracens
Martin Castrogiovanni	Prop	21 October 1981 (age 45)	62	(England) Leicester Tigers
Lorenzo Cittadini	Prop	17 December 1982 (age 43)	1	(Italy) Benetton Treviso
Salvatore Perugini	Prop	6 March 1978 (age 48)	66	(France) Bayonne
Valerio Bernabò	Lock	3 March 1984 (age 42)	13	(Italy) Roma Olimpic
Marco Bortolami	Lock	12 June 1980 (age 46)	77	(England) Gloucester
Carlo Del Fava	Lock	1 July 1981 (age 45)	41	(Italy) Viadana
Quintin Geldenhuys	Lock	19 June 1981 (age 45)	6	(Italy) Viadana
Antonio Pavanello	Lock	13 October 1982 (age 44)	5	(Italy) Benetton Treviso
Mauro Bergamasco	Flanker	1 May 1979 (age 47)	79	(France) Stade Français
Paul Derbyshire	Flanker	3 July 1986 (age 40)	1	(Italy) Petrarca Padova
Simone Favaro	Flanker	7 November 1988 (age 38)	5	(Italy) Overmach Parma
Josh Sole	Flanker	15 February 1980 (age 46)	41	(Italy) Viadana
Manoa Vosawai	Number 8	12 August 1983 (age 43)	5	(Italy) Overmach Parma
Alessandro Zanni	Number 8	31 January 1984 (age 42)	37	(Italy) Benetton Treviso
Pablo Canavosio	Scrum-half	26 December 1981 (age 44)	26	(Italy) Viadana
Simon Picone	Scrum-half	26 September 1982 (age 44)	20	(Italy) Benetton Treviso
Tito Tebaldi	Scrum-half	20 September 1987 (age 39)	6	(Italy) Gran Parma
Riccardo Bocchino	Fly-half	3 March 1988 (age 38)	0	(Italy) Rovigo
Craig Gower	Fly-half	29 April 1978 (age 48)	6	(France) Bayonne
Andrea Marcato	Fly-half	17 April 1983 (age 43)	16	(Italy) Benetton Treviso
Gonzalo Canale	Centre	11 November 1982 (age 44)	51	(France) Clermont
Gonzalo García	Centre	18 February 1984 (age 42)	13	(Italy) Benetton Treviso
Matteo Pratichetti	Centre	27 July 1985 (age 41)	20	(Italy) Viadana
Alberto Sgarbi	Centre	26 November 1986 (age 39)	5	(Italy) Benetton Treviso
Mirco Bergamasco	Wing	23 February 1983 (age 43)	66	(France) Stade Français
Andrea Masi	Wing	30 March 1981 (age 45)	46	(France) Racing Métro
Kaine Robertson	Wing	29 October 1980 (age 46)	41	(Italy) Viadana
Michele Sepe	Wing	8 October 1986 (age 40)	2	(Italy) Viadana
Paolo Buso	Fullback	28 July 1986 (age 40)	1	(Italy) Roma Olimpic
Luke McLean	Fullback	29 June 1987 (age 39)	11	(Italy) Benetton Treviso

== Scotland ==
Andy Robinson named his squad for the Six Nations on 20 January, while Welsh, Rennie, Blair and Thompson were invited to train with the squad. Back Row Scott Gray was called up to join the Scotland training camp. For the game against Wales several players were called up, including Blair, Cairns, R.Lamont and Walker. Additional players were called up for the Italy game, including MacLeod, Grant, Robertson and Webster. Players then to be selected to drop into the A team.

- Caps updated before the 2010 Six Nations Championship.

Head coach: Andy Robinson

Note: Flags indicate national union for the club/province as defined by World Rugby.

Player	Position	Date of birth (age)	Caps	Club/province
Ross Ford	Hooker	23 April 1984 (age 42)	33	(Scotland) Edinburgh
Dougie Hall	Hooker	24 September 1980 (age 46)	31	(Scotland) Glasgow Warriors
Scott Lawson	Hooker	28 September 1981 (age 45)	16	(England) Gloucester
Geoff Cross	Prop	1 December 1982 (age 43)	1	(Scotland) Edinburgh
Alasdair Dickinson	Prop	11 September 1983 (age 43)	13	(England) Gloucester
Allan Jacobsen	Prop	22 September 1978 (age 48)	40	(Scotland) Edinburgh
Moray Low	Prop	28 November 1984 (age 41)	5	(Scotland) Glasgow Warriors
Euan Murray	Prop	7 August 1980 (age 46)	28	(England) Northampton Saints
Jon Welsh	Prop	13 October 1986 (age 40)	0	(Scotland) Glasgow Warriors
Richie Gray	Lock	24 August 1989 (age 37)	0	(Scotland) Glasgow Warriors
Jim Hamilton	Lock	17 November 1982 (age 44)	23	(Scotland) Edinburgh
Nathan Hines	Lock	29 November 1976 (age 49)	61	(Ireland) Leinster
Alastair Kellock	Lock	14 June 1981 (age 45)	20	(Scotland) Glasgow Warriors
Scott MacLeod	Lock	3 March 1979 (age 47)	21	(Scotland) Edinburgh
John Barclay	Flanker	24 November 1986 (age 39)	13	(Scotland) Glasgow Warriors
Kelly Brown	Flanker	8 June 1982 (age 44)	30	(Scotland) Glasgow Warriors
Scott Gray	Flanker	25 February 1978 (age 48)	8	(England) Northampton Saints
Alan MacDonald	Flanker	21 October 1985 (age 41)	1	(Scotland) Edinburgh
Ross Rennie	Flanker	29 March 1986 (age 40)	1	(Scotland) Edinburgh
Alasdair Strokosch	Flanker	21 February 1983 (age 43)	14	(England) Gloucester
Johnnie Beattie	Number 8	21 November 1985 (age 41)	7	(Scotland) Glasgow Warriors
Roddy Grant	Number 8	31 January 1987 (age 39)	0	(Scotland) Edinburgh
Mike Blair (c)	Scrum-half	20 April 1981 (age 45)	59	(Scotland) Edinburgh
Chris Cusiter (c)	Scrum-half	13 June 1982 (age 44)	47	(Scotland) Glasgow Warriors
Rory Lawson	Scrum-half	12 March 1981 (age 45)	17	(England) Gloucester
Phil Godman	Fly-half	20 May 1982 (age 44)	20	(Scotland) Edinburgh
Ruaridh Jackson	Fly-half	12 February 1988 (age 38)	0	(Scotland) Glasgow Warriors
Dan Parks	Fly-half	26 May 1978 (age 48)	47	(Scotland) Glasgow Warriors
Ben Cairns	Centre	29 September 1985 (age 41)	7	(Scotland) Edinburgh
Nick De Luca	Centre	1 February 1984 (age 42)	14	(Scotland) Edinburgh
Max Evans	Centre	28 December 1983 (age 42)	6	(Scotland) Glasgow Warriors
Alex Grove	Centre	30 November 1987 (age 38)	3	(England) Worcester Warriors
Graeme Morrison	Centre	17 October 1982 (age 44)	18	(Scotland) Glasgow Warriors
Simon Danielli	Wing	8 November 1979 (age 47)	22	(Ireland) Ulster
Thom Evans	Wing	2 April 1985 (age 41)	8	(Scotland) Glasgow Warriors
Rory Lamont	Wing	10 October 1982 (age 44)	22	(France) Toulon
Sean Lamont	Wing	15 January 1981 (age 45)	40	(Wales) Scarlets
Mark Robertson	Wing	30 December 1984 (age 41)	0	(Scotland) Edinburgh
Simon Webster	Wing	8 March 1981 (age 45)	37	(Scotland) Edinburgh
Nikki Walker	Wing	5 March 1982 (age 44)	15	(Wales) Ospreys
Chris Paterson	Fullback	30 March 1978 (age 48)	98	(Scotland) Edinburgh
Hugo Southwell	Fullback	14 May 1980 (age 46)	48	(France) Stade Français
Jim Thompson	Fullback	5 November 1984 (age 42)	0	(Scotland) Edinburgh

== Wales ==
Warren Gatland named a 35-man squad for the 2010 Six Nations Championship. Scrum-halves Mike Phillips and Dwayne Peel were both left out due to injury. Ken Owens was called up to the squad to cover injury concerns at hooker. After Phillips and Peel recovered from injury they were recalled to the squad for the France match. Gareth Delve was called up to the squad ahead of the Ireland game, to cover for Ryan Jones.

- Caps updated before the 2010 Six Nations Championship.

Head coach: Warren Gatland

Note: Flags indicate national union for the club/province as defined by World Rugby.

Player	Position	Date of birth (age)	Caps	Club/province
Huw Bennett	Hooker	11 June 1983 (age 43)	27	(Wales) Ospreys
Ken Owens	Hooker	3 January 1987 (age 39)	0	(Wales) Scarlets
Matthew Rees	Hooker	9 December 1980 (age 45)	34	(Wales) Scarlets
Gareth Williams	Hooker	19 December 1978 (age 47)	7	(Wales) Cardiff Blues
Rhys Gill	Prop	30 October 1986 (age 40)	0	(England) Saracens
Paul James	Prop	13 May 1982 (age 44)	5	(Wales) Ospreys
Gethin Jenkins (vc)	Prop	17 November 1980 (age 46)	72	(Wales) Cardiff Blues
Adam Jones	Prop	8 March 1981 (age 45)	56	(Wales) Ospreys
Eifion Lewis-Roberts	Prop	13 February 1981 (age 45)	1	(England) Sale Sharks
Luke Charteris	Lock	9 March 1983 (age 43)	18	(Wales) Newport Gwent Dragons
Bradley Davies	Lock	9 January 1987 (age 39)	5	(Wales) Cardiff Blues
Ian Gough	Lock	10 November 1976 (age 50)	61	(Wales) Ospreys
Alun Wyn Jones	Lock	19 September 1985 (age 41)	35	(Wales) Ospreys
Deiniol Jones	Lock	18 November 1977 (age 49)	7	(Wales) Cardiff Blues
Dan Lydiate	Flanker	18 December 1987 (age 38)	2	(Wales) Newport Gwent Dragons
Andy Powell	Flanker	23 August 1981 (age 45)	12	(Wales) Cardiff Blues
Jonathan Thomas	Flanker	27 December 1982 (age 43)	50	(Wales) Ospreys
Sam Warburton	Flanker	5 October 1988 (age 38)	3	(Wales) Cardiff Blues
Martyn Williams	Flanker	1 September 1975 (age 51)	91	(Wales) Cardiff Blues
Gareth Delve	Number 8	30 December 1982 (age 43)	9	(England) Gloucester
Ryan Jones (c)	Number 8	13 March 1981 (age 45)	36	(Wales) Ospreys
Gareth Cooper	Scrum-half	7 May 1979 (age 47)	44	(Wales) Cardiff Blues
Dwayne Peel	Scrum-half	31 August 1981 (age 45)	72	(England) Sale Sharks
Mike Phillips	Scrum-half	29 August 1982 (age 44)	38	(Wales) Ospreys
Richie Rees	Scrum-half	21 May 1983 (age 43)	0	(Wales) Cardiff Blues
Martin Roberts	Scrum-half	6 June 1986 (age 40)	3	(Wales) Scarlets
Dan Biggar	Fly-half	16 October 1989 (age 37)	4	(Wales) Ospreys
Stephen Jones	Fly-half	8 December 1977 (age 48)	83	(Wales) Scarlets
Andrew Bishop	Centre	7 August 1985 (age 41)	8	(Wales) Ospreys
Jonathan Davies	Centre	5 April 1988 (age 38)	5	(Wales) Scarlets
James Hook	Centre	27 June 1985 (age 41)	37	(Wales) Ospreys
Jamie Roberts	Centre	8 November 1986 (age 40)	16	(Wales) Cardiff Blues
Tom Shanklin	Centre	24 November 1979 (age 46)	65	(Wales) Cardiff Blues
Leigh Halfpenny	Wing	22 December 1988 (age 37)	10	(Wales) Cardiff Blues
Tom James	Wing	17 April 1987 (age 39)	8	(Wales) Cardiff Blues
Kristian Phillips	Wing	2 September 1990 (age 36)	0	(Wales) Ospreys
Tom Prydie	Wing	23 February 1992 (age 34)	0	(Wales) Ospreys
Shane Williams	Wing	26 February 1977 (age 49)	68	(Wales) Ospreys
Lee Byrne	Fullback	1 June 1980 (age 46)	27	(Wales) Ospreys
