= 2005 Six Nations Championship =

Rugby union tournament

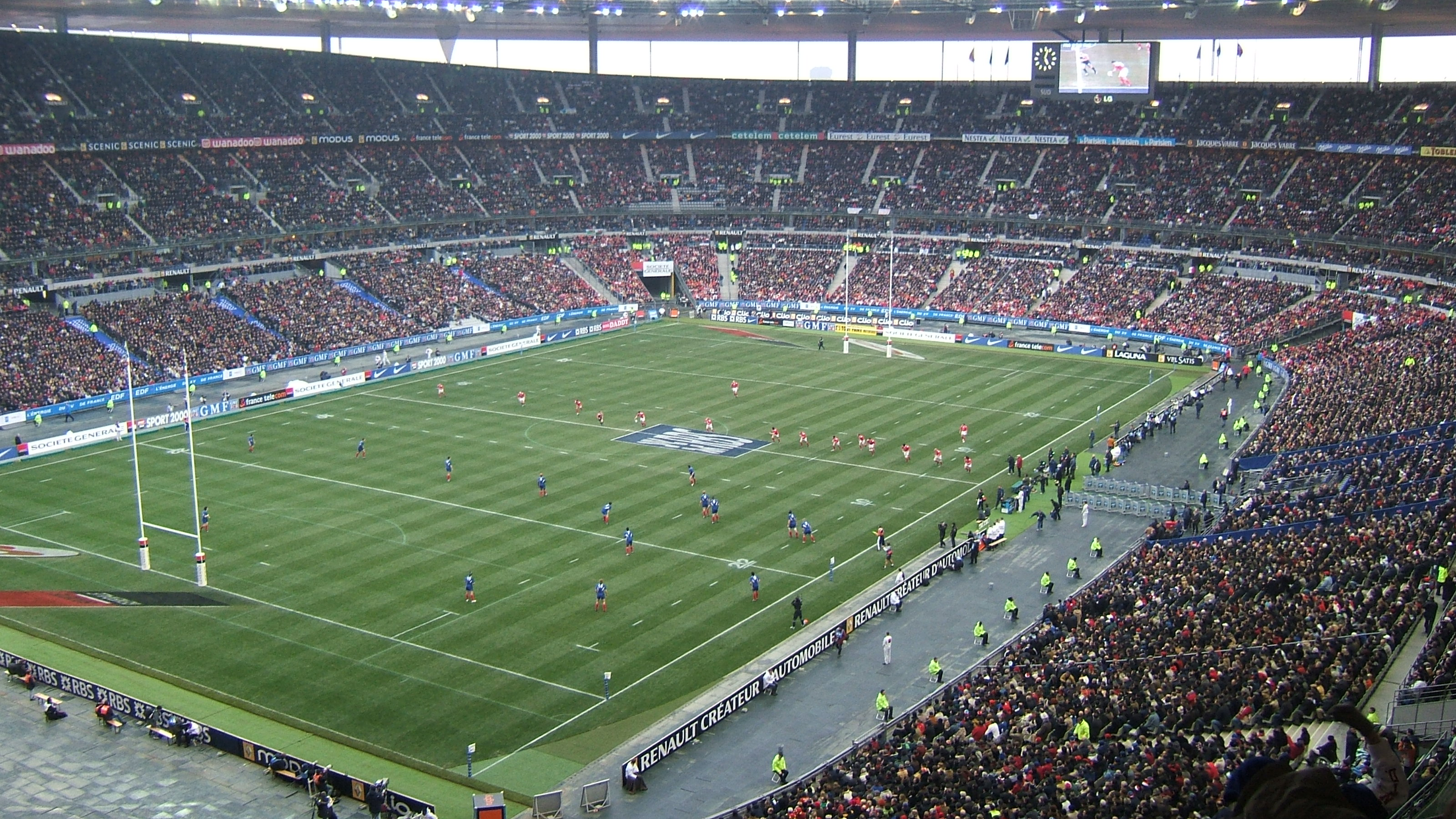
- Wales playing France on 26 February 2005
- Date: 5 February – 19 March 2005
- Countries: England; France; Ireland; Italy; Scotland; Wales

Tournament statistics
- Champions: Wales (23rd title)
- Grand Slam: Wales (9th title)
- Triple Crown: Wales (18th title)
- Matches played: 15
- Tries scored: 71 (4.73 per match)
- Top point scorer: (Ireland) Ronan O'Gara (60)
- Top try scorer: (England) Mark Cueto (4)
- Player of the tournament: (Wales) Martyn Williams

The 2005 Six Nations Championship was the sixth Six Nations Championship played since the competition expanded in 2000 to include Italy. Including the Home Nations and Five Nations Championships, this was the 111th season of the tournament.

Wales won the Grand Slam, their first since 1978, and in doing so became the first team to win a Grand Slam playing more games away than at home.

== Participants ==
Nation	Venue	City	Head coach	Captain
England	Twickenham Stadium	London	(England) Andy Robinson	Jason Robinson/Martin Corry
France	Stade de France	Saint-Denis	(France) Bernard Laporte	Fabien Pelous
Ireland	Lansdowne Road	Dublin	(Republic of Ireland) Eddie O'Sullivan	Brian O'Driscoll/Paul O'Connell
Italy	Stadio Flaminio	Rome	(New Zealand) John Kirwan	Marco Bortolami
Scotland	Murrayfield Stadium	Edinburgh	(Australia) Matt Williams	Gordon Bulloch
Wales	Millennium Stadium	Cardiff	(Wales) Mike Ruddock	Gareth Thomas

== Table ==
Pos	Team	Pld	W	D	L	PF	PA	PD	T	Pts
1	Wales	5	5	0	0	151	77	+74	17	10
2	France	5	4	0	1	134	82	+52	13	8
3	Ireland	5	3	0	2	126	101	+25	12	6
4	England	5	2	0	3	121	77	+44	16	4
5	Scotland	5	1	0	4	84	155	−71	8	2
6	Italy	5	0	0	5	55	179	−124	5	0

Source: Six Nations Rugby
Rules for classification: Match winners received two points, with one for a draw and none for a loss. The first tiebreaker was points difference.

== Results ==
=== Round 1 ===
5 February 2005
14:00 GMT

France	16–9	Scotland
Try: Traille 77' c Con: Michalak (1/1) 78'; Pen: Delaigue 49', 54'; Drop: Delaigue 73'	Report	Pen: Paterson (3) 2', 39', 42'

Stade de France, Saint-Denis
Attendance: 78,069
Referee: Nigel Williams (Wales)

FB	15	Pépito Elhorga
RW	14	Aurélien Rougerie	(substituted off) 18'
OC	13	Brian Liebenberg
IC	12	Damien Traille
LW	11	Christophe Dominici
FH	10	Yann Delaigue	(substituted off) 73'
SH	9	Pierre Mignoni
N8	8	Patrick Tabacco	(substituted off) 64'
OF	7	Sébastien Chabal
BF	6	Julien Bonnaire
RL	5	Jérôme Thion
LL	4	Fabien Pelous
TP	3	Pieter de Villiers	(substituted off) 51'
HK	2	William Servat	(substituted off) 78'
LP	1	Sylvain Marconnet
Substitutions:
HK	16	Sébastien Bruno	(substituted on) 78'
PR	17	Olivier Milloud	(substituted on) 51'
LK	18	Grégory Lamboley	(substituted on) 68'
FL	19	Yannick Nyanga	(substituted on) 64'
SH	20	Dimitri Yachvili		(substituted on) 78'
FH	21	Frédéric Michalak	(substituted on) 73'
CE	22	Ludovic Valbon	(substituted on) 18'	(substituted off) 78'
Coach:
Bernard Laporte

FB	15	Chris Paterson
RW	14	Simon Danielli
OC	13	Andy Craig
IC	12	Hugo Southwell
LW	11	Sean Lamont
FH	10	Dan Parks
SH	9	Chris Cusiter
N8	8	Ally Hogg
OF	7	Jon Petrie
BF	6	Jason White
RL	5	Scott Murray	(substituted off) 65'
LL	4	Stuart Grimes	(substituted off) 79'
TP	3	Gavin Kerr	(substituted off) 54'	(substituted on) 73'
HK	2	Gordon Bulloch
LP	1	Tom Smith		(substituted off) 73'
Substitutions:
HK	16	Robbie Russell
PR	17	Bruce Douglas	(substituted on) 54'
LK	18	Nathan Hines	(substituted on) 65'
FL	19	Jon Dunbar	(substituted on) 79'
SH	20	Mike Blair
FH	21	Gordon Ross
FB	22	Ben Hinshelwood
Coach:
Matt Williams

Notes:

- This was Scotland's narrowest defeat at Stade de France in the Championship until 2017.
- This was Yann Delaigue's first match in the Championship since 1995.

5 February 2005
17:30 GMT

Wales	11–9	England
Try: S. Williams 9' m Pen: S. Jones 22'; Henson 76'	Report	Pen: Hodgson (3) 14', 48', 69'

Millennium Stadium, Cardiff
Attendance: 74,500
Referee: Steve Walsh (New Zealand)

FB	15	Gareth Thomas	(yellow card) 34'
RW	14	Hal Luscombe		(substituted off) 64'
OC	13	Tom Shanklin
IC	12	Gavin Henson
LW	11	Shane Williams
FH	10	Stephen Jones
SH	9	Dwayne Peel		(substituted off) 60'
N8	8	Michael Owen
OF	7	Martyn Williams
BF	6	Dafydd Jones		(substituted off) 63'
RL	5	Robert Sidoli
LL	4	Brent Cockbain		(substituted off) 73'
TP	3	Adam Jones		(substituted off) 73'
HK	2	Mefin Davies
LP	1	Gethin Jenkins
Substitutions:
HK	16	Robin McBryde
PR	17	John Yapp		(substituted on) 73'
FL	18	Jonathan Thomas		(substituted on) 73'
N8	19	Ryan Jones		(substituted on) 63'
SH	20	Gareth Cooper		(substituted on) 60'
FH	21	Ceri Sweeney
FB	22	Kevin Morgan		(substituted on) 64'
Coach:
Mike Ruddock

FB	15	Jason Robinson
RW	14	Mark Cueto
OC	13	Mathew Tait		(substituted off) 59'
IC	12	Jamie Noon
LW	11	Josh Lewsey
FH	10	Charlie Hodgson
SH	9	Matt Dawson		(substituted off) 63'
N8	8	Joe Worsley		(substituted off) 40'	(substituted on) 42'
OF	7	Andy Hazell
BF	6	Chris Jones
RL	5	Ben Kay
LL	4	Danny Grewcock	(yellow card) 34'	(substituted off) 66'
TP	3	Julian White			(substituted off) 72'
HK	2	Steve Thompson
LP	1	Graham Rowntree		(substituted off) 56'	(substituted on) 72'
Substitutions:
HK	16	Andy Titterrell
PR	17	Phil Vickery		(substituted on) 56'
LK	18	Steve Borthwick		(substituted on) 66'
N8	19	James Forrester		(substituted on) 40'	(substituted off) 42'
SH	20	Harry Ellis		(substituted on) 63'
FH	21	Olly Barkley		(substituted on) 59'
WG	22	Ben Cohen
Coach:
Andy Robinson

Notes:

- This was Wales' first victory against England since 1999.
- This was England's first defeat in the opening game in the Six Nations.
- This was England's first defeat in the opening game in the Championship since 1998.
- This was England's first defeat at Millennium Stadium.
- Shane Williams scored his first try against England.

6 February 2005
14:30 GMT

Italy	17–28	Ireland
Try: Castrogiovanni 79' m Pen: Orquera 7'; De Marigny (3) 34', 43', 60'	Report	Try: Murphy 25' m Stringer 49' c Hickie 75' c Con: O'Gara (2) 50', 76'; Pen: O'Gara (3) 21', 54', 72'

Stadio Flaminio, Rome
Attendance: 24,026
Referee: Paddy O'Brien (New Zealand)

FB	15	Roland de Marigny
RW	14	Mirco Bergamasco
OC	13	Gonzalo Canale	(substituted off) 70'
IC	12	Andrea Masi
LW	11	Valerio Bernabó
FH	10	Luciano Orquera
SH	9	Alessandro Troncon
N8	8	Sergio Parisse	(substituted off) 76'
OF	7	Mauro Bergamasco
BF	6	Aaron Persico
RL	5	Marco Bortolami
LL	4	Santiago Dellapè	(substituted off) 65'
TP	3	Martín Castrogiovanni
HK	2	Fabio Ongaro	(substituted off) 76'
LP	1	Andrea Lo Cicero	(substituted off) 76'
Substitutions:
HK	16	Giorgio Intoppa	(substituted on) 76'
PR	17	Salvatore Perugini	(substituted on) 76'
LK	18	Carlo Del Fava	(substituted on) 65'
N8	19	David Dal Maso	(substituted on) 76'
SH	20	Paul Griffen
CE	21	Walter Pozzebon
FB	22	Kaine Robertson	(substituted on) 70'
Coach:
John Kirwan

FB	15	Geordan Murphy
RW	14	Shane Horgan
OC	13	Brian O'Driscoll
IC	12	Gordon D'Arcy	(substituted off) 29'
LW	11	Denis Hickie
FH	10	Ronan O'Gara
SH	9	Peter Stringer
N8	8	Anthony Foley	(substituted off) 76'
OF	7	Denis Leamy
BF	6	Simon Easterby
RL	5	Paul O'Connell	(substituted off) 76'
LL	4	Malcolm O'Kelly
TP	3	John Hayes
HK	2	Shane Byrne	(substituted off) 76'
LP	1	Reggie Corrigan	(substituted off) 60'
Substitutions:
HK	16	Frankie Sheahan	(substituted on) 76'
PR	17	Marcus Horan	(substituted on) 60'
LK	18	Donncha O'Callaghan	(substituted on) 76'
N8	19	Eric Miller	(substituted on) 76'
SH	20	Guy Easterby
FH	21	David Humphreys
FB	22	Girvan Dempsey	(substituted on) 29'
Coach:
Eddie O'Sullivan

=== Round 2 ===
12 February 2005
13:30 GMT

Italy	8–38	Wales
Try: Orquera 10' m Pen: De Marigny 44'	Report	Try: J. Thomas 4' c Shanklin 20' m M. Williams 40' c Cockbain 53' c S. Williams 56' c Sidoli 71' m Con: S. Jones (4) 5', 40', 53', 57'

Stadio Flaminio, Rome
Attendance: 24,800
Referee: Andrew Cole (Australia)

FB	15	Roland de Marigny			(substituted off) 73'
RW	14	Mirco Bergamasco	(substituted off) 54'
OC	13	Walter Pozzebon
IC	12	Andrea Masi	22' to 24'
LW	11	Ludovico Nitoglia
FH	10	Luciano Orquera
SH	9	Alessandro Troncon	(substituted off) 57'
N8	8	Sergio Parisse
OF	7	Mauro Bergamasco	(substituted off) 23'
BF	6	Aaron Persico
RL	5	Marco Bortolami
LL	4	Santiago Dellapè	(substituted off) 57'
TP	3	Martín Castrogiovanni	(substituted off) 57'
HK	2	Fabio Ongaro	(substituted off) 67'
LP	1	Andrea Lo Cicero
Substitutions:
HK	16	Giorgio Intoppa	(substituted on) 67'
PR	17	Salvatore Perugini	(substituted on) 57'
LK	18	Carlo Del Fava	(substituted on) 57'
FL	19	David Dal Maso	(substituted on) 23'
SH	20	Paul Griffen	(substituted on) 57'
CE	21	Matteo Barbini	(substituted on) 22'	(substituted off) 24'	(substituted on) 73'
FB	22	Kaine Robertson	(substituted on) 54'
Coach:
John Kirwan

FB	15	Gareth Thomas
RW	14	Hal Luscombe	(substituted off) 54'
OC	13	Tom Shanklin
IC	12	Gavin Henson
LW	11	Shane Williams
FH	10	Stephen Jones	(substituted off) 61'
SH	9	Dwayne Peel	(substituted off) 57'
N8	8	Michael Owen
OF	7	Martyn Williams	(substituted off) 73'
BF	6	Jonathan Thomas
RL	5	Robert Sidoli
LL	4	Brent Cockbain	(substituted off) 61'
TP	3	Adam Jones	(substituted off) 61'
HK	2	Mefin Davies	(substituted off) 61'
LP	1	Gethin Jenkins
Substitutions:
HK	16	Robin McBryde	(substituted on) 61'
PR	17	John Yapp	(substituted on) 61'
LK	18	Ian Gough	(substituted on) 61'
FL	19	Robin Sowden-Taylor	(substituted on) 73'
SH	20	Gareth Cooper	(substituted on) 57'
FH	21	Ceri Sweeney	(substituted on) 61'
FB	22	Kevin Morgan	(substituted on) 54'
Coach:
Mike Ruddock

Notes:

- This was Italy's biggest defeat against Wales at Stadio Flaminio.

12 February 2005
16:00 GMT

Scotland	13–40	Ireland
Try: Southwell 11' m Petrie 58' m Pen: Paterson 8'	Report	Try: O'Kelly 23' c O'Connell 38' m Hickie 42' c Hayes 72' m Duffy 79' c Con: O'Gara (2) 24', 44'; Humphreys 79'; Pen: O'Gara (3) 18', 35', 48'

Murrayfield Stadium, Edinburgh
Attendance: 64,826
Referee: Joël Jutge (France)

FB	15	Chris Paterson
RW	14	Simon Danielli
OC	13	Andy Craig
IC	12	Hugo Southwell
LW	11	Sean Lamont
FH	10	Dan Parks
SH	9	Chris Cusiter	5' to 16'		(substituted off) 70'
N8	8	Ally Hogg
OF	7	Jon Petrie
BF	6	Jason White
RL	5	Scott Murray	(substituted off) 70'
LL	4	Stuart Grimes
TP	3	Gavin Kerr	(substituted off) 70'
HK	2	Gordon Bulloch
LP	1	Tom Smith
Substitutions:
HK	16	Robbie Russell
PR	17	Bruce Douglas	(substituted on) 70'
LK	18	Nathan Hines	(substituted on) 70'
FL	19	Jon Dunbar
SH	20	Mike Blair	(substituted on) 5'	(substituted off) 16'	(substituted on) 70'
FH	21	Gordon Ross
FB	22	Ben Hinshelwood
Coach:
Matt Williams

FB	15	Geordan Murphy
RW	14	Girvan Dempsey
OC	13	Shane Horgan
IC	12	Kevin Maggs
LW	11	Denis Hickie	(substituted off) 75'
FH	10	Ronan O'Gara	(substituted off) 75'
SH	9	Peter Stringer	(substituted off) 75'
N8	8	Anthony Foley
OF	7	Johnny O'Connor	(substituted off) 66'
BF	6	Simon Easterby
RL	5	Paul O'Connell
LL	4	Malcolm O'Kelly	(substituted off) 75'
TP	3	John Hayes
HK	2	Shane Byrne	(substituted off) 70'
LP	1	Reggie Corrigan	(substituted off) 70'
Substitutions:
HK	16	Frankie Sheahan	(substituted on) 70'
PR	17	Marcus Horan	(substituted on) 70'
LK	18	Donncha O'Callaghan	(substituted on) 75'
N8	19	Eric Miller	(substituted on) 66'
SH	20	Guy Easterby	(substituted on) 75'
FH	21	David Humphreys	(substituted on) 75'
FB	22	Gavin Duffy	(substituted on) 75'
Coach:
Eddie O'Sullivan

13 February 2005
15:00 GMT

England	17–18	France
Try: Barkley 18' c Lewsey 35' c Con: Hodgson (2) 19', 36'; Pen: Hodgson 26'	Report	Pen: Yachvili (6) 4', 28', 51', 56', 62', 69'

Twickenham Stadium, London
Attendance: 82,000
Referee: Paddy O'Brien (New Zealand)

FB	15	Jason Robinson
RW	14	Mark Cueto	(substituted off) 69'
OC	13	Jamie Noon
IC	12	Olly Barkley
LW	11	Josh Lewsey
FH	10	Charlie Hodgson
SH	9	Harry Ellis	(substituted off) 72'
N8	8	Martin Corry	61' to 67'
OF	7	Lewis Moody
BF	6	Joe Worsley
RL	5	Ben Kay
LL	4	Danny Grewcock
TP	3	Phil Vickery
HK	2	Steve Thompson
LP	1	Graham Rowntree
Substitutions:
HK	16	Andy Titterrell
PR	17	Andrew Sheridan
LK	18	Steve Borthwick
FL	19	Andy Hazell	(substituted on) 61'	(substituted off) 67'
SH	20	Matt Dawson	(substituted on) 72'
CE	21	Henry Paul
WG	22	Ben Cohen	(substituted on) 69'
Coach:
Andy Robinson

FB	15	Pépito Elhorga
RW	14	Jimmy Marlu	(substituted off) 42'
OC	13	Brian Liebenberg
IC	12	Damien Traille
LW	11	Christophe Dominici
FH	10	Yann Delaigue	(substituted off) 67'
SH	9	Dimitri Yachvili
N8	8	Julien Bonnaire
OF	7	Sébastien Chabal	(substituted off) 48'
BF	6	Serge Betsen
RL	5	Jérôme Thion
LL	4	Fabien Pelous	(substituted off) 79'
TP	3	Nicolas Mas	(substituted off) 48'
HK	2	Sébastien Bruno	(substituted off) 48'
LP	1	Sylvain Marconnet
Substitutions:
HK	16	William Servat	(substituted on) 48'
PR	17	Olivier Milloud	(substituted on) 48'
LK	18	Grégory Lamboley	(substituted on) 79'
FL	19	Yannick Nyanga	(substituted on) 48'
SH	20	Pierre Mignoni
FH	21	Frédéric Michalak	(substituted on) 67'
CE	22	Jean-Philippe Grandclaude	(substituted on) 42'
Coach:
Bernard Laporte

Notes:

- This was England's first defeat against France at Twickenham Stadium since 1997.
- This is England's narrowest defeat in the Championship.
- Dimitri Yachvili scored 18 points beating Gérald Merceron's 14 points in 2001. This was the record against England until 2016.

=== Round 3 ===
26 February 2005
14:00 GMT

Scotland	18–10	Italy
Pen: Paterson (6) 4', 30', 49', 52', 69', 74'	Report	Try: Masi 77' c Con: De Marigny 78'; Pen: De Marigny 20'

Murrayfield Stadium, Edinburgh
Attendance: 63,823
Referee: Stuart Dickinson (Australia)

FB	15	Chris Paterson
RW	14	Simon Webster
OC	13	Andy Craig
IC	12	Hugo Southwell	(substituted off) 70'
LW	11	Sean Lamont
FH	10	Dan Parks	(substituted off) 76'
SH	9	Chris Cusiter	(substituted off) 76'
N8	8	Ally Hogg
OF	7	Jon Petrie
BF	6	Simon Taylor	(substituted off) 74'
RL	5	Scott Murray	(substituted off) 74'
LL	4	Stuart Grimes
TP	3	Gavin Kerr	(substituted off) 72'
HK	2	Gordon Bulloch	(substituted off) 76'
LP	1	Tom Smith
Substitutions:
HK	16	Robbie Russell	(substituted on) 76'
PR	17	Bruce Douglas	(substituted on) 72'
LK	18	Nathan Hines	(substituted on) 74'
FL	19	Jon Dunbar	(substituted on) 74'
SH	20	Mike Blair	(substituted on) 76'
FH	21	Gordon Ross	(substituted on) 76'
FB	22	Ben Hinshelwood	(substituted on) 70'
Coach:
Matt Williams

FB	15	Roberto Pedrazzi
RW	14	Mirco Bergamasco	(substituted off) 72'
OC	13	Andrea Masi
IC	12	Cristian Stoica	(substituted off) 57'
LW	11	Ludovico Nitoglia
FH	10	Luciano Orquera	(substituted off) 67'
SH	9	Alessandro Troncon
N8	8	Giorgio Intoppa
OF	7	David Dal Maso
BF	6	Aaron Persico
RL	5	Silvio Orlando
LL	4	Santiago Dellapè	(substituted off) 63'
TP	3	Salvatore Perugini	(substituted off) 63'
HK	2	Fabio Ongaro
LP	1	Andrea Lo Cicero
Substitutions:
LK	16	Sergio Parisse
PR	17	Martín Castrogiovanni	(substituted on) 63'
LK	18	Carlo Del Fava	(substituted on) 63'
FL	19	Marco Bortolami
SH	20	Paul Griffen	(substituted on) 67'
CE	21	Roland de Marigny	(substituted on) 57'
FB	22	Kaine Robertson	(substituted on) 72'
Coach:
John Kirwan

26 February 2005
16:00 GMT

France	18–24	Wales
Try: Yachvili 3' c Rougerie 11' m Con: Yachvili 4'; Pen: Yachvili 25'; Drop: Michalak 61'	Report	Try: M. Williams (2) 41' c, 44' m Con: S. Jones 41'; Pen: S. Jones (3) 22', 40', 65'; Drop: S. Jones 71'

Stade de France, Saint-Denis
Attendance: 80,000
Referee: Paul Honiss (New Zealand)

FB	15	Julien Laharrague
RW	14	Aurélien Rougerie
OC	13	Yannick Jauzion
IC	12	Damien Traille	(substituted off) 46'
LW	11	Christophe Dominici
FH	10	Yann Delaigue	(substituted off) 50'
SH	9	Dimitri Yachvili
N8	8	Julien Bonnaire	(substituted off) 58'
OF	7	Yannick Nyanga
BF	6	Serge Betsen
RL	5	Jérôme Thion	(substituted off) 72'
LL	4	Fabien Pelous
TP	3	Nicolas Mas	(substituted off) 48'
HK	2	Sébastien Bruno	(substituted off) 40'
LP	1	Sylvain Marconnet
Substitutions:
HK	16	William Servat	(substituted on) 40'
PR	17	Olivier Milloud	(substituted on) 48'
LK	18	Grégory Lamboley	(substituted on) 72'
N8	19	Imanol Harinordoquy	(substituted on) 58'
SH	20	Pierre Mignoni
FH	21	Frédéric Michalak	(substituted on) 50'
CE	22	Jean-Philippe Grandclaude	(substituted on) 46'
Coach:
Bernard Laporte

FB	15	Gareth Thomas	(substituted off) 40'
RW	14	Kevin Morgan	(substituted off) 58'
OC	13	Tom Shanklin
IC	12	Gavin Henson
LW	11	Shane Williams
FH	10	Stephen Jones
SH	9	Dwayne Peel	(substituted off) 65'
N8	8	Michael Owen
OF	7	Martyn Williams
BF	6	Ryan Jones	(substituted off) 76'
RL	5	Robert Sidoli
LL	4	Brent Cockbain
TP	3	Adam Jones	(substituted off) 65'
HK	2	Mefin Davies	(substituted off) 62'
LP	1	Gethin Jenkins
Substitutions:
HK	16	Robin McBryde	(substituted on) 62'
PR	17	John Yapp	(substituted on) 65'
FL	18	Jonathan Thomas	(substituted on) 76'
FL	19	Robin Sowden-Taylor
SH	20	Gareth Cooper	(substituted on) 65'
FH	21	Ceri Sweeney	(substituted on) 58'
FB	22	Rhys Williams	(substituted on) 40'
Coach:
Mike Ruddock

27 February 2005
15:00 GMT

Ireland	19–13	England
Try: O'Driscoll 57' c Con: O'Gara 58'; Pen: O'Gara (2) 9', 12'; Drop: O'Gara (2) 3', 32'	Report	Try: Corry 6' c Con: Hodgson 7'; Pen: Hodgson 24'; Drop: Hodgson 55'

Lansdowne Road, Dublin
Attendance: 49,000
Referee: Jonathan Kaplan (South Africa)

FB	15	Geordan Murphy
RW	14	Girvan Dempsey
OC	13	Brian O'Driscoll
IC	12	Shane Horgan
LW	11	Denis Hickie
FH	10	Ronan O'Gara
SH	9	Peter Stringer
N8	8	Anthony Foley
OF	7	Johnny O'Connor
BF	6	Simon Easterby
RL	5	Paul O'Connell
LL	4	Malcolm O'Kelly
TP	3	John Hayes
HK	2	Shane Byrne
LP	1	Reggie Corrigan	(substituted off) 67'
Substitutions:
HK	16	Frankie Sheahan
PR	17	Marcus Horan	(substituted on) 67'
LK	18	Donncha O'Callaghan
N8	19	Eric Miller
SH	20	Guy Easterby
FH	21	David Humphreys
CE	22	Kevin Maggs
Coach:
Eddie O'Sullivan

FB	15	Jason Robinson
RW	14	Mark Cueto
OC	13	Jamie Noon
IC	12	Olly Barkley
LW	11	Josh Lewsey
FH	10	Charlie Hodgson
SH	9	Harry Ellis	(substituted off) 69'
N8	8	Martin Corry
OF	7	Lewis Moody
BF	6	Joe Worsley
RL	5	Ben Kay
LL	4	Danny Grewcock
TP	3	Matt Stevens
HK	2	Steve Thompson
LP	1	Graham Rowntree
Substitutions:
HK	16	Andy Titterrell
PR	17	Duncan Bell
LK	18	Steve Borthwick
FL	19	Andy Hazell
SH	20	Matt Dawson	(substituted on) 69'
FH	21	Andy Goode
CE	22	Ollie Smith
Coach:
Andy Robinson

Notes:

- This is the first time England lost the first three games in the Championship since 1987.

=== Round 4 ===
12 March 2005
13:30 GMT

Ireland	19–26	France
Try: O'Driscoll 72' c Con: O'Gara 72'; Pen: O'Gara (4) 7', 17', 24', 46'	Report	Try: Dominici (2) 27' m, 77' m Baby 32' c Con: Yachvili 32'; Pen: Yachvili (2) 20', 60'; Drop: Delaigue 9'

Lansdowne Road, Dublin
Attendance: 48,452
Referee: Tony Spreadbury (England)

FB	15	Geordan Murphy
RW	14	Girvan Dempsey
OC	13	Brian O'Driscoll
IC	12	Kevin Maggs
LW	11	Denis Hickie
FH	10	Ronan O'Gara
SH	9	Peter Stringer
N8	8	Anthony Foley
OF	7	Johnny O'Connor
BF	6	Simon Easterby
RL	5	Paul O'Connell
LL	4	Malcolm O'Kelly
TP	3	John Hayes
HK	2	Shane Byrne
LP	1	Reggie Corrigan	(substituted off) 70'
Substitutions:
HK	16	Frankie Sheahan
PR	17	Marcus Horan	(substituted on) 70'
LK	18	Donncha O'Callaghan
N8	19	Eric Miller
SH	20	Guy Easterby
FH	21	David Humphreys
FB	22	Gavin Duffy
Coach:
Eddie O'Sullivan

FB	15	Julien Laharrague
RW	14	Cédric Heymans
OC	13	Yannick Jauzion
IC	12	Benoît Baby
LW	11	Christophe Dominici
FH	10	Yann Delaigue	(substituted off) 69'
SH	9	Dimitri Yachvili
N8	8	Julien Bonnaire
OF	7	Yannick Nyanga	(substituted off) 54'
BF	6	Serge Betsen
RL	5	Jérôme Thion
LL	4	Fabien Pelous	(substituted off) 71'
TP	3	Nicolas Mas	(substituted off) 40'
HK	2	Sébastien Bruno	(substituted off) 76'
LP	1	Sylvain Marconnet
Substitutions:
HK	16	Dimitri Szarzewski	(substituted on) 76'
PR	17	Pieter de Villiers	(substituted on) 40'
LK	18	Pascal Papé	(substituted on) 71'
LK	19	Grégory Lamboley	(substituted on) 54'
SH	20	Pierre Mignoni
FH	21	Frédéric Michalak	(substituted on) 69'
CE	22	David Marty
Coach:
Bernard Laporte

12 March 2005
16:00 GMT

England	39–7	Italy
Try: Cueto (3) 8' c, 40' m, 63' m Thompson 36' c Balshaw 59' m Hazell 79' c Con: Hodgson (2) 9', 37'; Goode 79'; Pen: Hodgson 6'	Report	Try: Troncon 44' c Con: Peens 46'

Twickenham Stadium, London
Attendance: 81,736
Referee: Mark Lawrence (South Africa)

FB	15	Iain Balshaw
RW	14	Mark Cueto
OC	13	Jamie Noon	(substituted off) 64'
IC	12	Olly Barkley
LW	11	Josh Lewsey
FH	10	Charlie Hodgson	(substituted off) 73'
SH	9	Harry Ellis	(substituted off) 50'
N8	8	Martin Corry
OF	7	Lewis Moody
BF	6	Joe Worsley	(substituted off) 73'
RL	5	Ben Kay
LL	4	Danny Grewcock	(substituted off) 61'
TP	3	Matt Stevens
HK	2	Steve Thompson	(substituted off) 64'
LP	1	Graham Rowntree	(substituted off) 73'
Substitutions:
HK	16	Andy Titterrell	(substituted on) 64'
PR	17	Duncan Bell	(substituted on) 73'
LK	18	Steve Borthwick	(substituted on) 61'
FL	19	Andy Hazell	(substituted on) 73'
SH	20	Matt Dawson	(substituted on) 50'
FH	21	Andy Goode	(substituted on) 73'
CE	22	Ollie Smith	(substituted on) 64'
Coach:
Andy Robinson

FB	15	Gert Peens
RW	14	Silvio Orlando
OC	13	Andrea Masi
IC	12	Matteo Barbini	28' to 31'		(substituted off) 40'
LW	11	Ludovico Nitoglia
FH	10	Luciano Orquera
SH	9	Alessandro Troncon
N8	8	Sergio Parisse
OF	7	David Dal Maso	(substituted off) 40'
BF	6	Aaron Persico
RL	5	Marco Bortolami
LL	4	Carlo Del Fava	(substituted off) 53'
TP	3	Salvatore Perugini	(substituted off) 53'
HK	2	Fabio Ongaro	(substituted off) 20'
LP	1	Andrea Lo Cicero
Substitutions:
HK	16	Giorgio Intoppa	(substituted on) 20'	(substituted off) 57'
PR	17	Mario Savi		(substituted on) 57'
PR	18	Martín Castrogiovanni	(substituted on) 53'
LK	19	Santiago Dellapè	(substituted on) 53'
FL	20	Roberto Pedrazzi	(substituted on) 40'
SH	21	Paul Griffen
CE	22	Walter Pozzebon	(substituted on) 28'	(substituted off) 31'	(substituted on) 40'
Coach:
John Kirwan

Notes:

- Mark Cueto scored the first hat-trick in the Six Nations since Jason Robinson against Italy in 2004.

13 March 2005
15:00 GMT

Scotland	22–46	Wales
Try: Craig 52' c R. Lamont 66' m Paterson 69' c Con: Paterson (2) 53', 70'; Pen: Paterson 21'	Report	Try: R. Jones 3' c R. Williams (2) 9' c, 48' m S. Williams 13' c Morgan (2) 26' c, 38' c Con: S. Jones (5) 4', 10', 13', 26', 39'; Pen: S. Jones (2) 17', 74'

Murrayfield Stadium, Edinburgh
Attendance: 67,274
Referee: Jonathan Kaplan (South Africa)

FB	15	Chris Paterson
RW	14	Rory Lamont
OC	13	Andy Craig	(substituted off) 74'
IC	12	Hugo Southwell
LW	11	Sean Lamont
FH	10	Dan Parks	(substituted off) 40'
SH	9	Chris Cusiter	(substituted off) 43'
N8	8	Ally Hogg
OF	7	Jon Petrie
BF	6	Simon Taylor
RL	5	Scott Murray
LL	4	Stuart Grimes	(substituted off) 40'
TP	3	Gavin Kerr	(substituted off) 40'
HK	2	Gordon Bulloch
LP	1	Tom Smith
Substitutions:
HK	16	Robbie Russell
PR	17	Bruce Douglas	(substituted on) 40'
LK	18	Nathan Hines	(substituted on) 40'
FL	19	Jon Dunbar
SH	20	Mike Blair	(substituted on) 43'
FH	21	Gordon Ross	(substituted on) 40'
CE	22	Andrew Henderson	(substituted on) 74'
Coach:
Matt Williams

FB	15	Kevin Morgan
RW	14	Rhys Williams				(substituted off) 68'
OC	13	Tom Shanklin		7' to 15'
IC	12	Gavin Henson		(substituted off) 74'
LW	11	Shane Williams
FH	10	Stephen Jones
SH	9	Dwayne Peel
N8	8	Michael Owen
OF	7	Martyn Williams
BF	6	Ryan Jones
RL	5	Robert Sidoli
LL	4	Brent Cockbain	(yellow card) 61'	(substituted off) 71'
TP	3	Adam Jones		(substituted off) 63'
HK	2	Mefin Davies		(substituted off) 49'
LP	1	Gethin Jenkins
Substitutions:
HK	16	Robin McBryde		(substituted on) 49'
PR	17	John Yapp		(substituted on) 63'
FL	18	Jonathan Thomas		(substituted on) 71'
FL	19	Robin Sowden-Taylor
SH	20	Mike Phillips
FH	21	Ceri Sweeney		(substituted on) 74'
WG	22	Hal Luscombe		(substituted on) 7'	(substituted off) 15'	(substituted on) 68'
Coach:
Mike Ruddock

=== Round 5 ===
19 March 2005
13:00 GMT

Italy	13–56	France
Try: Robertson 23' c Con: Peens 24'; Pen: Peens (2) 2', 42'	Report	Try: Nyanga 9' c Jauzion 14' c Laharrague 33' c Marty (2) 65' c, 76' m Lamboley 70' c Mignoni 79' c Con: Yachvili (4) 10', 15', 34', 66'; Michalak (2) 71', 79'; Pen: Yachvili (3) 6', 49', 52'

Stadio Flaminio, Rome
Attendance: 23,638
Referee: Donal Courtney (Ireland)

FB	15	Gert Peens
RW	14	Kaine Robertson			(substituted off) 67'
OC	13	Andrea Masi
IC	12	Simon Picone	55' to 61'
LW	11	Ludovico Nitoglia
FH	10	Luciano Orquera
SH	9	Alessandro Troncon	(substituted off) 58'
N8	8	Sergio Parisse
OF	7	David Dal Maso	(substituted off) 71'
BF	6	Aaron Persico
RL	5	Marco Bortolami
LL	4	Santiago Dellapè	1' to 8'		(substituted off) 60'
TP	3	Salvatore Perugini
HK	2	Fabio Ongaro	(substituted off) 55'
LP	1	Andrea Lo Cicero	(substituted off) 27'
Substitutions:
HK	16	Carlo Festuccia	(substituted on) 55'
PR	17	Martín Castrogiovanni	(substituted on) 27'
LK	18	Carlo Del Fava	(substituted on) 1'	(substituted off) 8'	(substituted on) 60'
FL	19	Silvio Orlando	(substituted on) 71'
SH	20	Paul Griffen	(substituted on) 58'
CE	21	Roberto Pedrazzi	(substituted on) 55'	(substituted off) 61'	(substituted on) 67'
FB	22	Roland de Marigny
Coach:
John Kirwan

FB	15	Julien Laharrague
RW	14	Cédric Heymans
OC	13	Yannick Jauzion
IC	12	David Marty
LW	11	Christophe Dominici	(substituted off) 31'
FH	10	Yann Delaigue	(substituted off) 60'
SH	9	Dimitri Yachvili	(substituted off) 68'
N8	8	Julien Bonnaire
OF	7	Yannick Nyanga	(substituted off) 67'
BF	6	Serge Betsen
RL	5	Jérôme Thion
LL	4	Fabien Pelous
TP	3	Nicolas Mas	(substituted off) 40'
HK	2	Sébastien Bruno	(substituted off) 59'
LP	1	Sylvain Marconnet
Substitutions:
HK	16	William Servat	(substituted on) 59'
PR	17	Pieter de Villiers	(substituted on) 40'
LK	18	Pascal Papé
LK	19	Grégory Lamboley	(substituted on) 67'
SH	20	Pierre Mignoni	(substituted on) 68'
FH	21	Frédéric Michalak	(substituted on) 60'
CE	22	Damien Traille	(substituted on) 31'
Coach:
Bernard Laporte

19 March 2005
15:30 GMT

Wales	32–20	Ireland
Try: Jenkins 15' c Morgan 57' c Con: S. Jones (2) 16', 58'; Pen: Henson 22'; S. Jones (4) 30', 42', 50', 70'; Drop: Henson 12'	Report	Try: Horan 65' c Murphy 72' c Con: Humphreys (2) 65', 73'; Pen: O'Gara (2) 2', 34'

Millennium Stadium, Cardiff
Attendance: 74,376
Referee: Chris White (England)

FB	15	Kevin Morgan
RW	14	Mark Taylor
OC	13	Tom Shanklin
IC	12	Gavin Henson
LW	11	Shane Williams
FH	10	Stephen Jones
SH	9	Dwayne Peel
N8	8	Michael Owen
OF	7	Martyn Williams
BF	6	Ryan Jones
RL	5	Robert Sidoli
LL	4	Brent Cockbain
TP	3	Adam Jones	(substituted off) 66'
HK	2	Mefin Davies	(substituted off) 68'
LP	1	Gethin Jenkins
Substitutions:
HK	16	Robin McBryde	(substituted on) 68'
PR	17	John Yapp	(substituted on) 66'
FL	18	Jonathan Thomas
FL	19	Robin Sowden-Taylor
SH	20	Mike Phillips
FH	21	Ceri Sweeney
WG	22	Hal Luscombe
Coach:
Mike Ruddock

FB	15	Geordan Murphy
RW	14	Girvan Dempsey
OC	13	Brian O'Driscoll
IC	12	Kevin Maggs
LW	11	Denis Hickie
FH	10	Ronan O'Gara	(substituted off) 51'
SH	9	Peter Stringer
N8	8	Anthony Foley	(substituted off) 58'
OF	7	Johnny O'Connor
BF	6	Simon Easterby
RL	5	Paul O'Connell
LL	4	Malcolm O'Kelly	(substituted off) 62'
TP	3	John Hayes
HK	2	Shane Byrne	(substituted off) 62'
LP	1	Reggie Corrigan	(substituted off) 58'
Substitutions:
HK	16	Frankie Sheahan	(substituted on) 62'
PR	17	Marcus Horan	(substituted on) 58'
LK	18	Donncha O'Callaghan	(substituted on) 62'
N8	19	Eric Miller	(substituted on) 58'
SH	20	Guy Easterby
FH	21	David Humphreys	(substituted on) 51'
FB	22	Gavin Duffy
Coach:
Eddie O'Sullivan

Notes:

- This was Wales' first victory against Ireland since 2000.
- This was Wales' first victory against Ireland at the Millennium Stadium.
- This was Wales' first Grand Slam since 1978.
- This was Wales' first Triple Crown since 1988.

19 March 2005
18:00 GMT

England	43–22	Scotland
Try: Noon (3) 12' c, 21' c, 65' m Worsley 25' m Lewsey 33' c Ellis 47' c Cueto 69' m Con: Hodgson (4) 12', 22', 34', 48'	Report	Try: S. Lamont 39' c Craig 44' c Taylor 50' m Con: Paterson (2) 40', 45'; Pen: Paterson 20'

Twickenham Stadium, London
Attendance: 82,000
Referee: Alain Rolland (Ireland)

FB	15	Iain Balshaw	(substituted off) 31'
RW	14	Mark Cueto
OC	13	Jamie Noon
IC	12	Olly Barkley
LW	11	Josh Lewsey
FH	10	Charlie Hodgson	(substituted off) 75'
SH	9	Harry Ellis	(substituted off) 63'
N8	8	Martin Corry
OF	7	Lewis Moody
BF	6	Joe Worsley
RL	5	Ben Kay	(substituted off) 14'
LL	4	Danny Grewcock
TP	3	Duncan Bell	(substituted off) 51'
HK	2	Steve Thompson	(substituted off) 71'
LP	1	Matt Stevens
Substitutions:
HK	16	Andy Titterrell	(substituted on) 71'
PR	17	Mike Worsley	(substituted on) 51'
LK	18	Steve Borthwick	(substituted on) 14'
FL	19	Andy Hazell
SH	20	Matt Dawson	(substituted on) 63'
FH	21	Andy Goode	(substituted on) 75'
CE	22	Ollie Smith	(substituted on) 31'
Coach:
Andy Robinson

FB	15	Chris Paterson
RW	14	Rory Lamont
OC	13	Andy Craig
IC	12	Hugo Southwell
LW	11	Sean Lamont
FH	10	Gordon Ross
SH	9	Mike Blair
N8	8	Simon Taylor
OF	7	Ally Hogg	(substituted off) 63'
BF	6	Jason White
RL	5	Scott Murray	(substituted off) 32'
LL	4	Nathan Hines
TP	3	Gavin Kerr
HK	2	Gordon Bulloch
LP	1	Tom Smith	(substituted off) 23'
Substitutions:
HK	16	Robbie Russell
PR	17	Bruce Douglas	(substituted on) 23'
LK	18	Stuart Grimes	(substituted on) 32'
FL	19	Jon Petrie	(substituted on) 63'
SH	20	Graeme Beveridge
FH	21	Dan Parks
CE	22	Andrew Henderson
Coach:
Matt Williams

== Scorers ==
Leading try scorers
Pos	Name	Tries	Team
1	Mark Cueto	4	England
2	Kevin Morgan	3	Wales
2	Jamie Noon	3	England
2	Martyn Williams	3	Wales
2	Shane Williams	3	Wales

Leading point scorers
Pos	Name	Points	Team
1	Ronan O'Gara	60	Ireland
2	Stephen Jones	57	Wales
3	Dimitri Yachvili	53	France
4	Chris Paterson	49	Scotland
