= Ally Hogg =

Scotland international rugby union player

- Born: Allister Hogg; 20 January 1983 (age 43) Stirling, Scotland
- Height: 1.91 m (6 ft 3 in)
- Weight: 109 kg (17 st 2 lb)
- School: Stirling High School
- University: Telford College

Rugby union career
- Position: Flanker / Number eight
- Current team: Newcastle Falcons
Senior career
Years	Team	Apps	(Points)
2002–2010	Edinburgh	127	(105)
2010–2018	Newcastle Falcons	175	(20)
- Correct as of 13 December 2012
International career
Years	Team	Apps	(Points)
2004–2009	Scotland	48	(50)
- Correct as of 10 December 2012

3rd Sir Willie Purves Quaich
- In office 2002–2002
- Preceded by: Andrew Wilson
- Succeeded by: Chris Cusiter

Allister Hogg (born 20 January 1983 in Stirling, Scotland) is a Scottish former rugby union player who played at either flanker or number eight. He played for Edinburgh and Newcastle Falcons, and won 48 international caps for Scotland.

== Early life ==
Hogg attended Stirling High School, He also played basketball for Scotland at under-16 level. He graduated from Telford College in Edinburgh with an HND in Sports Coaching & Sports Development.

== Club career ==
Hogg signed his first pro contract with Edinburgh Rugby in 2002 and went on to establish himself as a first-team regular as well as an on-field leader of the team. Hogg was named Edinburgh's first-team captain in the summer of 2007 (alongside Simon Cross) following major restructuring of the club and a time that several large name players left. He became a talismanic player for the club during the upheaval and played every game in his final season at the club when he departed for Newcastle Falcons in 2010.

He played for Watsonian RFC in the 92nd Langholm Sevens competition.

Despite their relegation from the Aviva Premiership Hogg signed a new contract with the club in May 2012.

In the 2014–15 season, along with Mike Blair, Hogg became assistant coach of Ponteland Rugby Club.

In 2018 Hogg announced his retirement from professional rugby at the age of 35. "I've had a good run," Hogg said of his career, which started with Edinburgh and saw him capped 48 times for Scotland.

== International career ==
Hogg made his debut against Wales in Cardiff in 2004, a match Scotland lost 23–10, aged 21. He has established himself as one of Scotland's best players. His pace, strength, skill, and work ethic have already gone some way to gaining him international recognition. New Zealand openside flanker Richie McCaw rated Hogg as one of the best back rows in the game, shortly after he missed being selected for the 2005 British & Irish Lions tour of New Zealand.

Hogg immediately cemented a spot in the Scotland setup following his debut. Often playing at openside to accommodate Simon Taylor, he was known for his support play that lead to many of his tries for the national team. Hogg was selected for Scotland's 2007 Rugby World Cup squad, whilst becoming the first Scotland forward in 20-years to score a hat-trick of tries in one match, when he plundered a treble during the 42–0 World Cup win over Romania in September 2007.

Hogg continued to have an influence as Scotland improved throughout 2008, playing in both Tests as they registered a series draw in Argentina before packing down against the All Blacks and South Africa at Murrayfield during the autumn internationals.

In January 2009 Hogg was called into Scotland coach Frank Hadden's squad for the 2009 Six Nations. His latest cap came during the Six Nations Championship match against Wales on 8 February 2009. Hogg was moved to the blindside due to an injury to Nathan Hines, and Scotland went on to lose 26–13.

This combined with competition from new players such as Alasdair Strokosch and John Barclay lead to Hogg being dropped from the team and playing no further part in the campaign.

Despite a change of national coach Hogg was not recalled by Andy Robinson for Scotland duty, despite being a player that he had consistently turned to while in charge at Edinburgh.

In September 2012, Newcastle coach Dean Richards, petitioned for Hogg's return to the national fold following several outstanding performances at the start of the season, including a hat-trick of tries against London Scottish.

Hogg was recognised by Stirling Highland Games in 2014, being offered the honorary role as their 2014 Highland Games Chieftain.
