= Jean-Philippe Grandclaude =

French rugby union player (born 1982)

- Born: 4 August 1982 (age 44) Fréjus, France
- Height: 1.83 m (6 ft 0 in)
- Weight: 97 kg (15 st 4 lb)

Rugby union career
- Position: Centre
Senior career
Years	Team	Apps	(Points)
1998-2003	Béziers	24	(10)
2003-2004	US Colomiers	10	(5)
2004-2012	USA Perpignan	155	(145)
2012-2015	Stade Rochelais	41	(30)
- Correct as of 2007-06-12
International career
Years	Team	Apps	(Points)
2005-2007	France	3	(0)
- Correct as of 2007-06-12

Jean-Philippe Grandclaude (born 4 August 1982 in Fréjus, Var) is a French rugby union footballer who plays for USA Perpignan. He mainly plays at centre.

His professional career started with Béziers in 1998. He played with them until 2003; this included three caps in the 2001–02 European Challenge Cup, and five caps in the 2002-03 Heineken Cup.

In 2003 he joined US Colomiers whom he played for one season. In 2004 Grandclaude joined USA Perpignan and has played for them ever since.

He made his Test debut for France in 2005 when he came on as a substitute against England in France's 18-17 victory. He played once more during the 2005 Six Nations Championship, and did not receive his third cap until 2007 when he faced the All Blacks in New Zealand.
