= Sean Lamont =

Scottish rugby union player

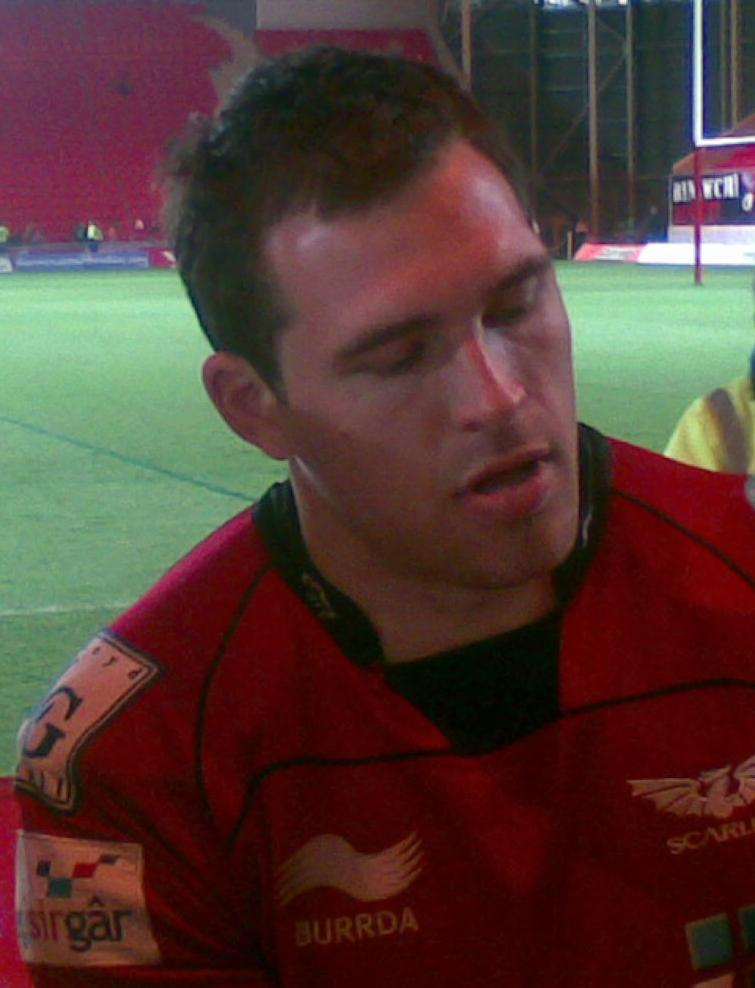
- Lamont signing autographs in 2011
- Born: Sean Fergus Lamont; 15 January 1981 (age 45) Perth, Scotland
- Height: 1.88 m (6 ft 2 in)
- Weight: 105 kg (16 st 7 lb)
- School: Belvoir High School; King Edward VII School
- University: Sheffield Hallam University
- Notable relative: Rory Lamont (brother)
- Occupation: Rugby coach

Rugby union career
- Position: Centre / Wing
Amateur team(s)
Years	Team	Apps	(Points)
- Glasgow Hawks
Senior career
Years	Team	Apps	(Points)
2000–03	Rotherham		
2003–05	Glasgow Warriors	42	(105)
2005–09	Northampton Saints	68	(115)
2009–12	Scarlets	58	(55)
2012–17	Glasgow Warriors	74	(45)
International career
Years	Team	Apps	(Points)
2004 – 2017	Scotland	105	(70)
Coaching career
- Years: Team
- 2017-2018: Scotland Blues (Strength & Conditioning)

Sean Lamont (born 15 January 1981) is a Scottish former international rugby union player and now Strength and Conditioning Coach. He played at centre and on the wing. He gained 105 caps for Scotland before retiring from international rugby in 2017.

== Rugby Union career ==
=== Amateur career ===
Lamont was born on 15 January 1981 in Perth, Scotland. He attended Sheffield Hallam University where he studied Sports Science between 1999 and 2002. Additionally whilst at Sheffield Hallam he played alongside the likes of Chris Jones (Sale and England) and Dave Strettle (Harlequins and England).

Lamont has played for Glasgow Hawks.

=== Professional career ===
In 2000 Lamont joined Rotherham and was the club’s under-21 captain in 2001. In the summer of 2003 he left Rotherham and joined Glasgow Rugby, where he went on to have a very successful first season and cemented himself as a fans' favourite at Hughenden. In the summer of 2005 Lamont joined Northampton Saints from Glasgow. Then, 13 days later, he added to his growing reputation by scoring four tries in one game against Saracens. Lamont is the first Saints player to achieve this since another Scot, Craig Moir, in 1996.

In May 2009 Lamont joined the Scarlets of Wales. He has signed for Glasgow for the 2012–13 season, joining his brother Rory at the club

In March 2017 Lamont announced his forthcoming retirement from professional rugby at the end of Glasgow's 2016-17 season. A fan petition was subsequently launched on ScotlandRugbyNews.com asking Lamont to recreate his iconic peroxide blonde hair with orange gloves, as per his breakthrough season in 2004.

=== International career ===
At the 2002 Commonwealth Games sevens tournament he represented Scotland.

Lamont earned his first cap for Scotland against Manu Samoa on their tour in the summer of 2004. On his Murrayfield debut he scored a try against the Australians in the autumn of 2004. In Scotland's 2005 Six Nations Championship match against Italy he was named man of the match.

Furthermore, Lamont helped the side to an historic victory for Scotland against the hopeful Grand Slam winners (France) in Scotland's Six Nations stunning 20–16 victory on 5 February 2006 by scoring two tries, one of which he joined a maul and used his strength and power to bundle over the line and take the Scots to victory. On 26 February 2006, he played a major part in the Scotland squad's victory over England to win the Calcutta Cup by 18–12.

Lamont was picked consistently through the 2007 Six Nations Championship for Scotland. In November 2007, Lamont suffered up a serious knee injury early on in a Saints versus Pertemps Bees match, putting him out for the rest of the season.

Despite starting in Scotlands first match of the 2009 Six Nations Championship, against Wales at Murrayfield, Lamont was dropped for the remainder of the tournament after a dip in club form was carried onto the international stage. He lost out to Thom Evans and Simon Danielli. Lamont's power and influence was missed as Scotland disappointed once again. Lamont's move to the Scarlets followed and in November 2009, under the guidance of new Scotland coach Andy Robinson, Lamont returned to the international stage. He played three November Tests, including a dramatic win over Australia at Murrayfield.

Lamont was ever present again during the 2010 Six Nations Championship as Scotland showed signs of resurgence under Andy Robinson. He also played in Scotland's notable 2–0 series win over Argentina during the Summer Internationals.

Lamont won his 100th cap in the victory over Samoa in the 2015 Rugby World Cup. He became only the second Scottish player to achieve 100 caps, after Chris Paterson (109). In March 2017 he announced his retirement from international rugby.

=== Coaching career ===
Lamont moved on to become a Strength and Conditioning Coach for the Scottish Rugby Academy. He is now the Team Manager and S&C coach for the GB Rugby SVNS team.

== Awards ==
Lamont was voted The Famous Grouse Player of the Season 2007, narrowly beating Chris Paterson, Simon Taylor and Kelly Brown to the award.

== Personal life ==
Lamont's younger brother Rory was also a Scotland international rugby union player, with two playing together for Scotland on a number of occasions.

Lamont has two children..
