= Andy Hazell =

England international rugby union player

- Born: Andrew Robert Hazell; 25 April 1978 (age 48) Gloucester, England
- Height: 1.83 m (6 ft 0 in)
- Weight: 95 kg (14 st 13 lb)
- School: Severn Vale School

Rugby union career
- Position: Flanker
- Current team: Gloucester Rugby
Youth career
- -: Old Richians
- –: Gloucester Old Boys
Senior career
| Years | Team | Apps | (Points) |
| 1997-2014 | Gloucester Rugby | 266 | (125) |
International career
| Years | Team | Apps | (Points) |
| 2002-2007 | England Saxons | | |
| 2004-2007 | England | 7 | (5) |

Andy Hazell (born 25 April 1978 in Gloucester) is a former English rugby union player who played at flanker and spent his entire career at Gloucester Rugby.

== Club career ==
He took up the game aged 12 when he joined Old Richians, where he stayed for four years before joining another of his local teams, Gloucester Old Boys. His first representative game was for the South West U16s before joining the Premiership and making his debut at 19. He went on to establish himself as the main openside flanker.

He was in the Powergen Cup winning side of 2003 and the Gloucester Rugby side that finished top of the 2003 Zurich Premiership. He was a try scorer in the 2006 European Challenge Cup Final Victory over London Irish at The Stoop. On 2 April 2013, it was announced that he had signed a one-year contract extension to keep him at Gloucester until the end of the 2013–2014 season. On 4 February 2014, Hazell announced his retirement from all forms of rugby due to persistent concussion injuries. Hazell was the longest-serving player at any professional rugby union club since the professional era began in 1995, spending 17 years with Gloucester Rugby and making a total of 266 appearances for the Cherry and Whites.

== International career ==
He pulled on an England shirt for the first time playing for England U21s and was a member of the SANZAR squad that played in the Argentina competition back in 1999. In 2001 he played for the England XV that took on the Barbarians and also went on the England tour to North America, playing in both midweek games and scoring a try against British Columbia. His England A debut came in 2002 when he played Scotland A at Headingley and impressed throughout the 2003 England A Six Nations tournament.

Hazell was chosen for England's highly successful senior tour of New Zealand and Australia in June 2003 and played in the 23–9 victory over New Zealand Māori in New Plymouth, before flying to Vancouver to become a member of England's Churchill Cup winning side in 2003 and returned again the following year. He was part of the wider 43-man England squad for the 2003 World Cup.

Hazell won his first cap starting as openside flanker in England's victory over Canada at Twickenham in November 2004 and another as a replacement in the match against South Africa a week later. The Investec series represented his first serious breakthrough into the senior England team.

Hazell played in four games of the 2005 Six Nations, scoring a try against Italy.
