= Jon Dunbar =

German rugby union player (born 1980)

- Born: 4 April 1980 (age 45); Wegberg, Germany

Jonathon Peter Andrew Dunbar (born 4 April 1980 in Wegberg, Germany) is a former rugby union international for Scotland. His usual position was at flanker.

== Rugby Union career ==
Dunbar was educated at Abingdon School where he was captain of the first XV and gained colours. In 1998 he was called up to the England Under 18 squad. He moved on to Durham University to read for a degree in European Studies and French at Queen's Campus Stockton, graduating in 2001.

He played for Grove RFC in the junior leagues in Oxfordshire before moving to play professionally for Newcastle Falcons RFC and then Leeds Carnegie. While at University he played for the England under-21 XV against Wales and France in the 2001 Six Nations Championship.

In April 2004 he played for Newcastle Falcons when they won the 2003–04 Powergen Cup defeating Sale Sharks 37–33. He joined Leeds Tykes from Newcastle and the following season was once again on the winning side when Leeds defeated Bath Rugby 20–12 in the 2004–05 Powergen Cup final.

In between the two finals he won two caps for Scotland in February 2005 in the 2005 Six Nations Championship, both as a replacement against France and Italy respectively. After his spell at Leeds he moved to Gran Parma in Italy for the 2009/10 season.

== Honours ==
- Powergen Cup/Anglo-Welsh Cup titles: 2 (2004 & 2005)
- Two Scottish international caps

== See also ==
- List of Scotland national rugby union players
- List of Old Abingdonians
