= Ryan Jones =

Welsh rugby union player (born 1981)

Ryan Jones MBE
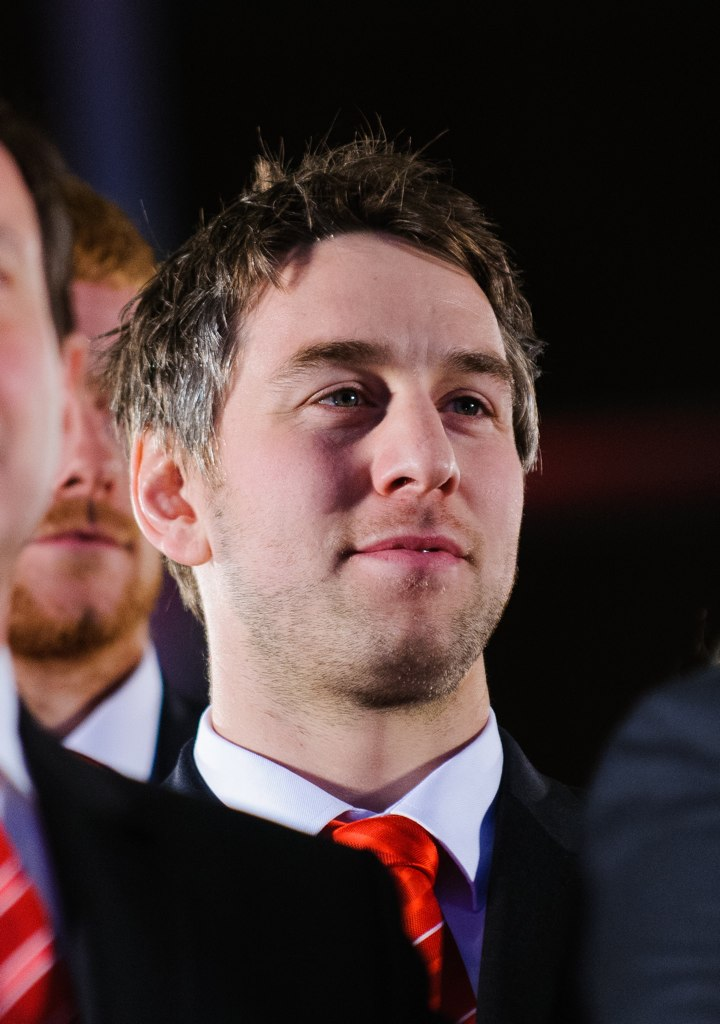
- Born: Ryan Paul Jones; 13 March 1981 (age 45) Newport, Wales
- Height: 196 cm (6 ft 5 in)
- Weight: 114 kg (17 st 13 lb; 251 lb)
- School: Bassaleg Comprehensive School
- University: UWIC

Rugby union career
- Position(s): Number 8, Flanker, Lock
Senior career
Years	Team	Apps	(Points)
1998–2000	Newport	1	(0)
2001–2003	Bridgend	12	(5)
2003–2004	Celtic Warriors	16	(5)
2004–2014	Ospreys	150	(100)
2014–2015	Bristol	9	(10)
- Correct as of 21 March 2015
International career
Years	Team	Apps	(Points)
2004–2014	Wales	75	(10)
2005	British & Irish Lions	3	(0)
- Correct as of 17 November 2013

Ryan Paul Jones MBE (born 13 March 1981) is a Wales former international rugby union player who played at number eight, blindside flanker or second row. He was involved in three Grand Slam wins, in 2005, as captain in 2008, and 2012. He is one of a small group of Welsh players to have won three Grand Slams including Gerald Davies, Gareth Edwards, J. P. R. Williams, Adam Jones, Gethin Jenkins and Alun Wyn Jones.

== Early life ==
Jones was born in Newport, and played junior football for Bristol City as a goalkeeper until the age of 14. He took up rugby union at age 17 to be with his friends at Risca RFC.

Ryan Jones studied at UWIC, now Cardiff Metropolitan University, gaining a BSc (Hons) from 1999 to 2002. He played over a hundred games for UWIC RFC and captained the firsts in his final year. Jones said of the university: "I was a student at Cardiff Met's Cyncoed Campus for three years. I was really inspired by the ethos of sporting excellence and University rugby was the springboard for my international career".

== Club career ==
Jones started his club career with Newport RFC making just one appearance as a replacement for Alix Popham versus Bridgend in May 1999. After leaving Newport he made 12 appearances for Bridgend RFC, before moving on to the Celtic Warriors at the start of regional rugby in 2003. In 2004, when the Celtic Warriors were disbanded he was offered a contract with the Ospreys, who went on to win the Celtic League in 2004–05 and its replacement, the Celtic League in 2006–07. Jones was appointed captain of the Ospreys at the start of the 2007–08 season and under his captaincy the team went on to win the Anglo-Welsh Cup in 2007–08, beating Leicester Tigers in the final at Twickenham and the Magners League for the third time in 2009–10, beating Leinster at the RDS Arena in Dublin in the play-off final. He was succeeded as captain by his Wales and British & Irish Lions colleague Alun Wyn Jones at the start of the 2010–11 season. On 24 March 2014, Jones signed for English club Bristol Rugby, who were competing in the RFU Championship, on a two-year contract from the 2014–15 season.

Jones retired from rugby in 2015 on medical advice following a reoccurring shoulder injury.

== International career ==
Jones made his international debut for Wales against South Africa in November 2004. He featured in Wales' 2005 Grand Slam-winning side. He was not initially selected for the 44-man squad for the 2005 British & Irish Lions tour to New Zealand. He was later called up as a replacement for the injured Simon Taylor. After his performance in the 30–19 win over Otago he was selected for the squad for the first test. He came on as a replacement and went on to start in the final two tests.

In January 2008, Jones was appointed captain of Wales by new coach Warren Gatland. In his first Six Nations tournament as captain, he led his team to a second Grand Slam in four years. In November 2008, Ryan Jones and Shane Williams became the first Welsh players to be nominated in a group of five players for the IRB International Player of the Year award, first awarded in 2001. Shane Williams was selected as the 2008 International Player of the Year.

In April 2009, Jones was omitted from the 2009 British & Irish Lions tour to South Africa. He was subsequently called up to join the squad on 9 June after Stephen Ferris pulled out with a knee injury, however within days of arriving in South Africa he was declared unfit by the Lions medical team due to head injuries he had sustained in a previous Wales test match.

Jones was named captain of the Welsh team for the Autumn internationals in 2009, when the side faced New Zealand, Samoa, Argentina and Australia.

Jones featured in all five of Wales' 2012 Six Nations matches, starting two, as he and the team secured a third Grand Slam in seven years. He also featured heavily in the following year's championship, captaining Wales in three of the five games, only missing the final 30–3 defeat of England through injury, as Wales defended their championship title.

Jones held the record as Wales' most capped captain by overtaking the record of 28 caps held by Ieuan Evans on 16 November 2012 versus Samoa. Jones' record of 33 caps as captain was surpassed by Sam Warburton on 14 March 2015.

He was appointed Member of the Order of the British Empire (MBE) in the 2021 Birthday Honours for services to rugby union football and charitable fundraising in Wales.

=== International tries ===
Try	Opponent	Location	Venue	Competition	Date	Result
1	Scotland	Edinburgh, Scotland	Murrayfield	2005 Six Nations	13 March 2005	Win
2	Australia	Sydney, Australia	Sydney Football Stadium	2012 Summer Internationals	23 June 2012	Loss

== Post rugby career ==
During February 2016, Jones was appointed as a joint Head of Rugby Performance for the Wales Rugby Union alongside Geraint John who was also newly appointed replacing Josh Lewsey in the role on the executive board. From January 2019, Jones was promoted to become the WRU Performance Director, a newly created role as part of the Professional Rugby Board (PRB), effectively swapping jobs with Geraint John. However, less than 2 years later in October 2020, Jones resigned from the executive job at WRU.

== Personal life ==
His father, Stephen Jones, was a police officer in the Gwent Constabulary, based in Cwmbran. Ryan is married to Charlotte. He has three children from his first marriage and a further three step-children with his second wife.

In 2022, he was diagnosed with early onset dementia, probable chronic traumatic encephalopathy (CTE). In the same interview, he also noted that he had been diagnosed with depression following his retirement from rugby in 2015, which was believed to be a symptom of the later dementia diagnosis.
