= Rob Moffat =

- Occupation: Rugby Coach

Rugby union career
- Position: Backs Coach
- Current team: Romania national rugby union team
Coaching career
- Years: Team
- 2007–2011: Edinburgh
- Borders
- 1999-2002: Glasgow Warriors (Asst.)
- –: Melrose

Rob Moffat is a Scottish former rugby union coach and player. He is co-director of Melrose RFC and was previously head coach at Edinburgh 2009–2011, having been the assistant coach under Andy Robinson before that. He was the backs coach for Romania 2016–2018. He has been involved in coaching Scotland A, Glasgow Warriors and the Borders.

== Career ==
As a PE teacher and head of department at Galashiels Academy Moffat taught the likes of Gregor Townsend, John Collins, Chris Paterson and Geoff Cross.

He went on to take over from Jim Telfer as the Melrose coach in the early 1990s before becoming assistant coach at the Borders when the game turned professional in 1997. When that team was merged with Edinburgh he joined Glasgow before returning to the borders when the team was revived.

When it was again disbanded in 2007 Moffat moved to Edinburgh where he was assistant under Robinson and coached Scotland A to the final of the 2008 Churchill Cup where they were defeated by England Saxons.

In July 2009 Moffat took over the head coach roll at Edinburgh following Robinson's appointment as head coach of the national side. In his first season they finished 6th in the Celtic League and failed to make progress from the pool stages of the Heineken Cup having won three of their matches.

The 2010 Magners campaign got off to a poor start with three losses on the trot before managing to overcome Leinster with a bonus point win at home in Murrayfield. By January Edinburgh had climbed to 7th but a home loss to the Scarlets and failure to progress in the Heineken Cup with only one win in six saw Moffat's time as head coach come to an end. On 31 January 2011 he was sacked by Edinburgh following a disappointing start to the season. Within a couple of months, Scottish Rugby had announced that he would take up a new coaching and technical role involved with the Scotland under-20 and under-20 A teams.

Moffat was in charge of elite private school, Merchiston Castle School. First XV and is also Director of Rugby at the school. He left Merchiston Castle School at the end of the 2015-16 rugby season.

He worked as backs coach for Romania under head coach Lynn Howells from 2016 until 2018.

In 2020, he became co-director of Melrose RFC.

In November 2025 he was inducted into Scottish Rugby's hall of fame.
