= Nicolas Mas =

French rugby union player (born 1980)

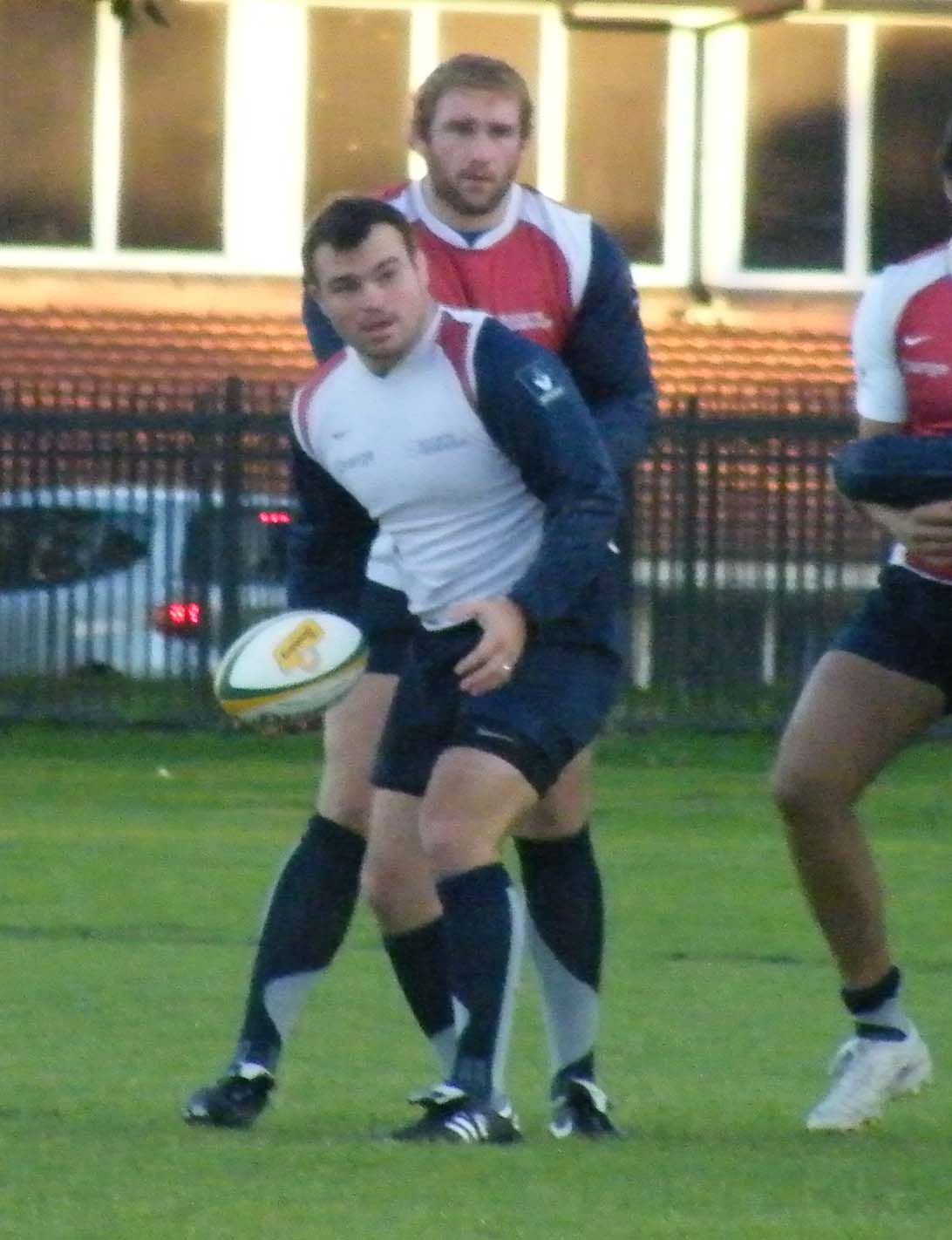
- Nicolas Mas, June 2009
- Born: 25 May 1980 (age 46) Perpignan, France
- Height: 1.80 m (5 ft 11 in)
- Weight: 108 kg (17 st 0 lb)

Rugby union career
- Position: Tighthead Prop
Senior career
Years	Team	Apps	(Points)
1999–2013	Perpignan	268	(25)
2013–2016	Montpellier	48	(0)
International career
Years	Team	Apps	(Points)
2003–2015	France	85	(5)

Nicolas Mas (born 25 May 1980) is a retired French rugby union footballer, who last played for Montpellier Hérault Rugby in the Top 14. His usual position was at prop. He also played for the France national team. His nickname is le bus (the bus).

== Club career ==
Perpignan made it to the final of the 2002-03 Heineken Cup, but went down to fellow French club Stade Toulousain. Mas made his international debut in a match against the All Blacks on 28 June 2003. He did not play at the 2003 Rugby World Cup in Australia later that year. Perpignan made it to the final of the Top 14 in 2004, but were defeated by Stade Français, 38 to 20. In the summer of 2013, Mas moved to ambitious fellow Top 14 club Montpellier Hérault Rugby.

== International career ==
Mas made his debut for the France in 2003. He did not play for France in 2004, being an unused bench replacement in tests against Australia and Argentina in November. The following year he played four times for France during the 2005 Six Nations Championship.

Mas was named to the France squad for the 2007 Rugby World Cup as a replacement for the injured Sylvain Marconnet. He also competed at the 2011 Rugby World Cup in New Zealand.
