= Jonathan Thomas =

Wales international rugby union footballer

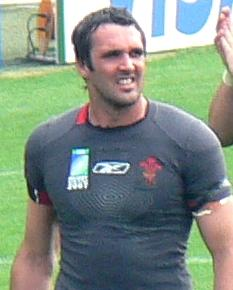
- Born: Jonathan James Thomas; 27 December 1982 (age 43) Pembroke, Wales
- Height: 196 cm (6 ft 5 in)
- Weight: 112 kg (17 st 9 lb; 247 lb)
- School: Pembroke Comprehensive School
- University: Swansea
- Occupation(s): Professional Rugby Player Forwards and Defence Coach

Rugby union career
- Position(s): Flanker, Number 8, Lock
Senior career
Years	Team	Apps	(Points)
2001–2003	Swansea	25	(0)
2003–2013	Ospreys	188	(70)
2013–2015	Worcester Warriors	44	(0)
International career
Years	Team	Apps	(Points)
2003–2011	Wales	67	(35)

Jonathan Thomas (born 27 December 1982, in Pembroke) is a Welsh rugby union coach and former player, he played mainly at flanker having also played at number eight and lock. He was previously head coach of Worcester Warriors.

== Early life ==
Thomas was an international cricketer playing for Wales u.15's

== Career ==
=== Club ===
Thomas started out playing for Pembroke RFC juniors, before playing for Swansea RFC when they were still a professional club, captaining them at 19. With the regionalisation of Welsh rugby in 2003, Swansea combined with Neath to form the Ospreys, where over a 10-year period Thomas won four league titles and an Anglo-Welsh Cup. He is the youngest player to captain the Ospreys. At the time of leaving, he was the joint highest appearance holder, together with Andrew Bishop on 188 appearances.

On 28 May 2013, Thomas joined English team Worcester Warriors from the 2013–14 season. He was soon made club captain for Worcester Warriors for the 2013–14 season.

=== International career ===
Thomas played for Wales at Under 16, Youth, Under 19, Under 21 and Sevens level. He made his international debut against Australia in 2003. Many noticed him during the 2003 Rugby World Cup in the match against New Zealand for his man of the match display. He also played in the 2007 Rugby World Cup. Thomas was part of two Six Nations Grand Slams, in 2005, and in 2008 where he started every game. Thomas was included in every Wales Six Nations squad between 2004 and 2011. In his appearances for Wales, he scored seven tries.

=== Coaching ===
Thomas joined Bristol Rugby ahead of the 2016/17 campaign as Defence and Forwards Coach.

He moved to former club Worcester Warriors ahead of the 2020–21 season. He left with immediate effect on 25 January 2022.

Thomas then joined Ealing Trailfinders as a coaching consultant, before joining Wales as a contact area coach. He left his position with Wales after the 2023 Rugby World Cup.

Ahead of the 2025–26 Super Rygbi Cymru season, he joined Swansea RFC as head coach, before stepping down in December due to ill health.
