= Jamie Noon =

England international rugby union player

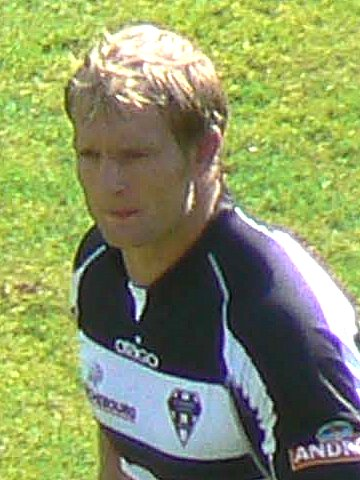
- Born: Jamie Darren Noon; 9 May 1979 (age 47) Goole, Yorkshire, England
- Height: 5 ft 10 in (1.78 m)
- Weight: 14 st 0 lb (89 kg)
- School: Lawrence House; Fyling Hall; Newcastle College
- University: Northumbria University

Rugby union career
- Position(s): Outside centre, Inside centre, Centre
Youth career
- Whitby
Senior career
Years	Team	Apps	(Points)
1998–2010	Newcastle Falcons	203	(260)
2010–2013	CA Brive	100	(40)
2013-14	Tulle	11	(10)
International career
Years	Team	Apps	(Points)
2001 - 2009	England	38	(35)
- Correct as of 7 February 2009

Jamie Darren Noon (born 9 May 1979 in Goole) is a retired rugby union footballer who played at centre.

== Career ==
Hard-running centre Noon joined the Newcastle Falcons for the 1998–99 Allied Dunbar Premiership, after a letter from one of his school teachers alerted the club to a player who had been totally missed by the representative rugby system in Yorkshire.

Playing for Fyling Hall School and Whitby RFC at the time, once the Falcons had seen his talents first hand, he was drafted into the academy squad straightaway. Whilst at Newcastle he started in both the 2001 and 2004 Anglo-Welsh Cup finals as Newcastle emerged victorious from both.

"Noonie", as he is known to close friends, went on to graduate from Northumbria University with a sports science degree, while his on-field activity was equally successful as he made two first team appearances in his first year at the club.

Later that year he represented England in the Sanzar Under-21 tournament, what would later go on to become the IRB Under-21 World Championship, while his first Premiership try duly came early in the 1999–2000 season away to the London Wasps.

As well as representing the England Under-21s he played for the North of England and England Students, while in the 1999–2000 season he played for the England Sevens on the IRB Sevens circuit, including in the Hong Kong Sevens.

In 2003, Noon set a record for consecutive Premiership appearances after starting 50 league games in a row.

Full international recognition came in the summer of 2001 when he started three Tests for England on their North American tour – two against Canada and one versus the United States, with the Goole-born player scoring his first Test try in the second of the two clashes against the Canadians.

In 2003 he played in England's warm-up matches for the 2003 Rugby World Cup, although he was to agonisingly miss out on selection for the tournament itself. He did, however, go on to be named Falcons player of the year for the 2003–04 Zurich Premiership.

England Saxons honours in the 2004 Churchill Cup followed as he played against Canada and scored in the final against the New Zealand Maori, while the 2004–05 Zurich Premiership was to prove a major success as he was named joint vice captain of the Falcons.

Drafted into a new-look England back line, Noon started all five matches for England during the 2005 Six Nations Championship, rounding it off with a historic hat-trick in the final match of the tournament against Scotland at Twickenham. Married to wife Rachel, both she and new baby boy Lewis were there in the stands to witness it first hand.

His England caps continued to come throughout the 2006 Six Nations Championship and the summer tour to Australia.

Noon was a part of the England squad that made it to the final of the 2007 Rugby World Cup in France, Noon played in the first couple of pool matches, but picked up a knee injury in the 36–0 defeat to South Africa.

Mathew Tait took his spot at outside centre which proved to be very pivotal, as Noon's young Newcastle teammate was one of England's standout players throughout the tournament, in particular the final where he ran 50 meters and evaded five Springboks tacklers, only to be pulled down a few metres short by a great cover tackle by Victor Matfield.

However through hard work and a retirement to veteran Mike Catt, Noon was re-instated at centre for England's 2008 Six Nations Championship campaign, he played in every match, apart from the defeat to Wales, and was one of England's best players throughout the tournament despite only coming away with three wins.

Noon was particularly impressive in the final match against Ireland where he scored a try and pulled off a number of hard hits, it caused many commentators to say he played well, and to also be awarded "Man of the Match" ahead of an impressive Danny Cipriani.

Noon went on the summer tour to New Zealand, which was marred by controversy involving England players' off-field antics. England lost both matches heavily.
