= Severn Vale School =

Location
- School Lane; Gloucester, Gloucestershire, GL2 4PR; England
- 51°49′27″N 2°17′15″W

Information
- Type: Academy
- Motto: Challenging All to Succeed
- Department for Education URN: 137298 Tables
- Ofsted: Reports
- Headteacher: Richard Johnson
- Gender: Both
- Age: 11 to 16
- Enrolment: 1,161
- Houses: W, R, O, Y, G, B, I, V and T
- Colours: Blue and red
- Website: http://www.severnvaleschool.com

Severn Vale School is a secondary school with academy status in Quedgeley, Gloucester, England. Its students are aged from 11 to 16. The headmaster is Richard Johnson.

In 2011, Ofsted rated the school as "good".

== GCSEs ==
GCSEs are the final examinations students take at the school. Being a technology college, students take a design and technology subject. The choice is food technology, resistant materials, textiles, or graphic design. There are a variety of other subjects that can be taken. Students must take English, mathematics, science and a short course in religious education. Students must attend physical education lessons, but will only be examined if they choose to study it at GCSE level. Students may choose to continue studying a modern language.

GCSE results have improved at the school. In 2004, only 40% of students gained 5 or more GCSE grades A*-C. In 2012, 89% of students achieved 5 or more A*-C grades, with 65% achieving 5 A*-C grades including English and Maths.
