= Yann Delaigue =

France international rugby union player (born 1973)

- Born: Yann Delaigue; 5 April 1973 (age 53) Vienne, France
- Height: 1.81 m (5 ft 11 in)
- Weight: 83 kg (183 lb)

Rugby union career
- Position: Fly-half
Amateur team(s)
Years	Team	Apps	(Points)
1988	CS Vienne		
- Correct as of 13 July 2014
Senior career
Years	Team	Apps	(Points)
1988–1997	Toulon		
1997–2004	Toulouse		
2004–2006	Castres		
2006–2007	Toulon		
- Correct as of 13 July 2014
International career
Years	Team	Apps	(Points)
1994-2005	France	20	(37)
- Correct as of 13 July 2014

Yann Delaigue (born 5 April 1973) is a retired French international rugby union player.

A highly talented player, nicknamed « Little Mozart », he played the first two matches of the 1995 Rugby World Cup. In 2001 he was part of the French Barbarians against Fiji.

In 2003, he won the Heineken Cup for Toulouse, scoring five penalties and a conversion.

He earned his first cap with the French national team on 19 March 1994 against Scotland in a Five Nations Championship match that ended in a 20-12 victory.
