= Grégory Lamboley =

France international rugby union player (born 1982)

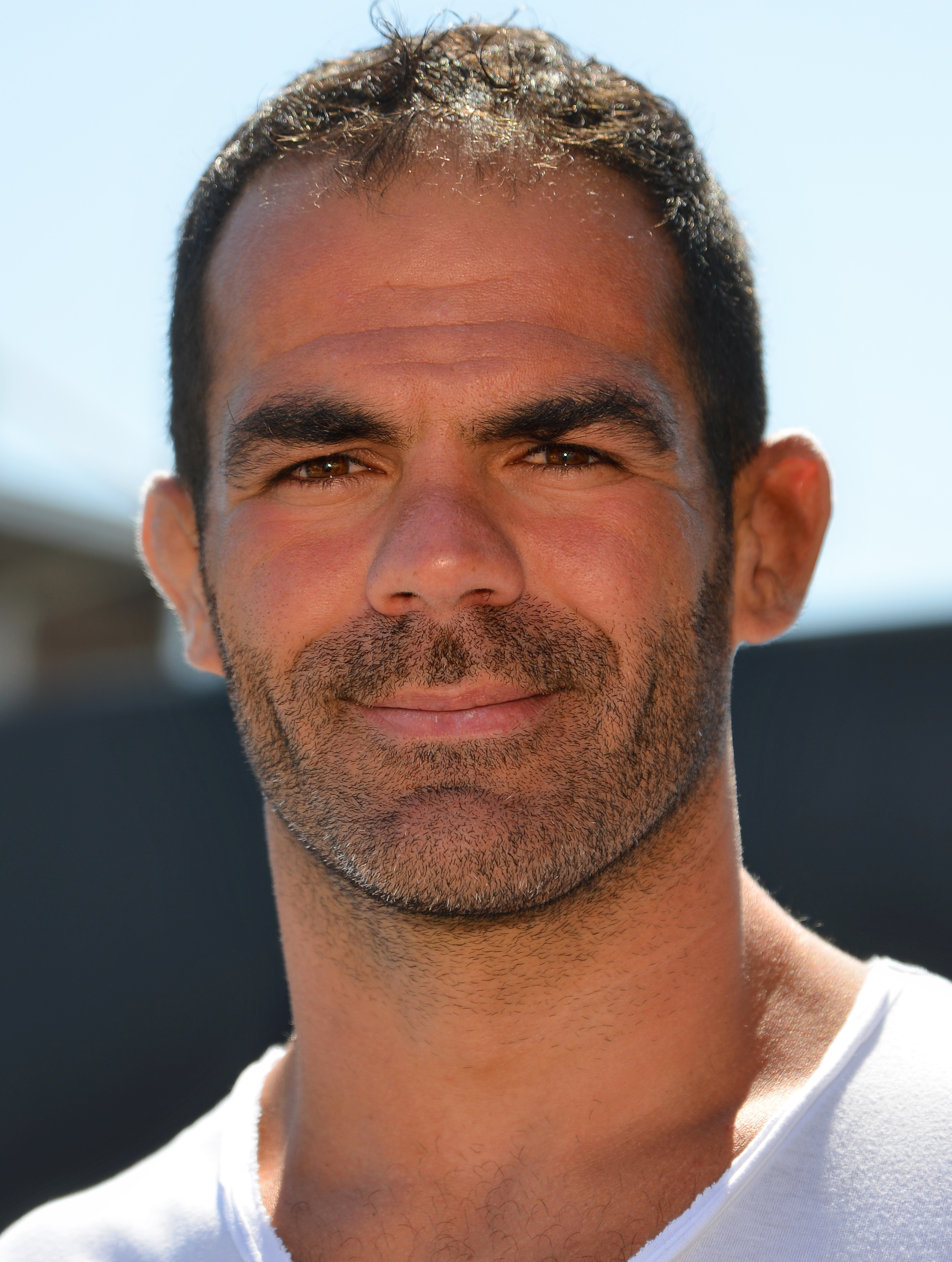
- Born: 12 January 1982 (age 44) Paris, France
- Height: 1.95 m (6 ft 5 in)
- Weight: 104 kg (229 lb)

Rugby union career
- Position: Lock
Senior career
Years	Team	Apps	(Points)
2000–2017	Toulouse	321	(115)
2017–2018	La Rochelle		
- Correct as of 31 January 2015
International career
Years	Team	Apps	(Points)
2005–	France	14	(5)
- Correct as of 21 November 2011

Grégory Lamboley (12 January 1982) is a French rugby union footballer, currently playing for Stade Toulousain in the Top 14, the top competition of rugby in France. Lamboley has also played for the French national team. His usual position is as a lock or a flanker. Prior to playing for Toulouse he played for Massy. He made his debut for the French national team in 2005 in a match against Scotland. He was educated at the Lycée Lakanal in Sceaux. Whilst at Toulouse he helped them win the Heineken Cup in 2003 when he featured as a replacement.
