= Rory Lamont =

Scotland international rugby union player

- Born: Rory Patrick Lamont; 10 October 1982 (age 44) Perth, Scotland
- Height: 1.88 m (6 ft 2 in)
- Weight: 100 kg (15 st 10 lb; 220 lb)
- School: King Edward VII School
- University: Northampton University
- Occupation: Rugby player

Rugby union career
- Position: Fullback / Wing
Senior career
Years	Team	Apps	(Points)
2004–2007	Glasgow Warriors	54	(95)
2007–2009	Sale Sharks	21	(45)
2009–2011	Toulon	37	(15)
2011–2013	Glasgow Warriors	6	(5)
- Correct as of 19 May 2013
International career
Years	Team	Apps	(Points)
2005–2013	Scotland	29	(30)
- Correct as of 25 October 2012

Rory Lamont (born 10 October 1982 in Perth) is a former rugby union player who played as full-back and on the wing for Glasgow Warriors and Scotland. He prides himself on his versatility. Rory is the younger brother of Sean Lamont.

== Rugby union playing career ==
=== Club career ===
Lamont played for Northampton Saints, and also for Northampton Old Scouts RFC after leaving Northampton Saints.

In February 2009 it was announced that he was to join RC Toulon in France's Top 14.

On 27 November he terminated his contract himself as he felt he was not getting enough playing time, risking him losing his place in the Scottish side. He was linked with a return to Northampton Saints as a winger but also to Harlequins and Saracens. He joined Glasgow Warriors in December 2011.

=== International career ===
Lamont made a memorable try-scoring debut for Scotland in the 2005 Six Nations Championship match against Wales at Murrayfield. He also played for Scotland A against Australia A in the experimental position of inside centre at national coach Frank Hadden's request.

He played in the 2007 Rugby World Cup at full-back, arguably being Scotland's best back in the tournament. While playing for Scotland against England on 8 March 2008, he sustained a facial fracture.

He returned for the 2011 World Cup, but only played one game, against Georgia.

=== Injuries and concussions ===
During the match against France in the 2012 Six Nations Championship, Lamont broke his leg. He never managed to regain full fitness after this injury.

Lamont experienced numerous other injuries, and was knocked out ten times in his career.

=== Retirement ===
Lamont announced his retirement from professional rugby on 26 April 2013, citing as a deciding factor his inability to recover fully from the broken leg he had suffered against France the previous year.

== Life after rugby playing career ==
Lamont experienced depression and other mental problems adjusting to the end of his playing career, and has been active in trying to help other people in similar situations.
