= Nathan Hines =

British Lions & Scotland international rugby union player

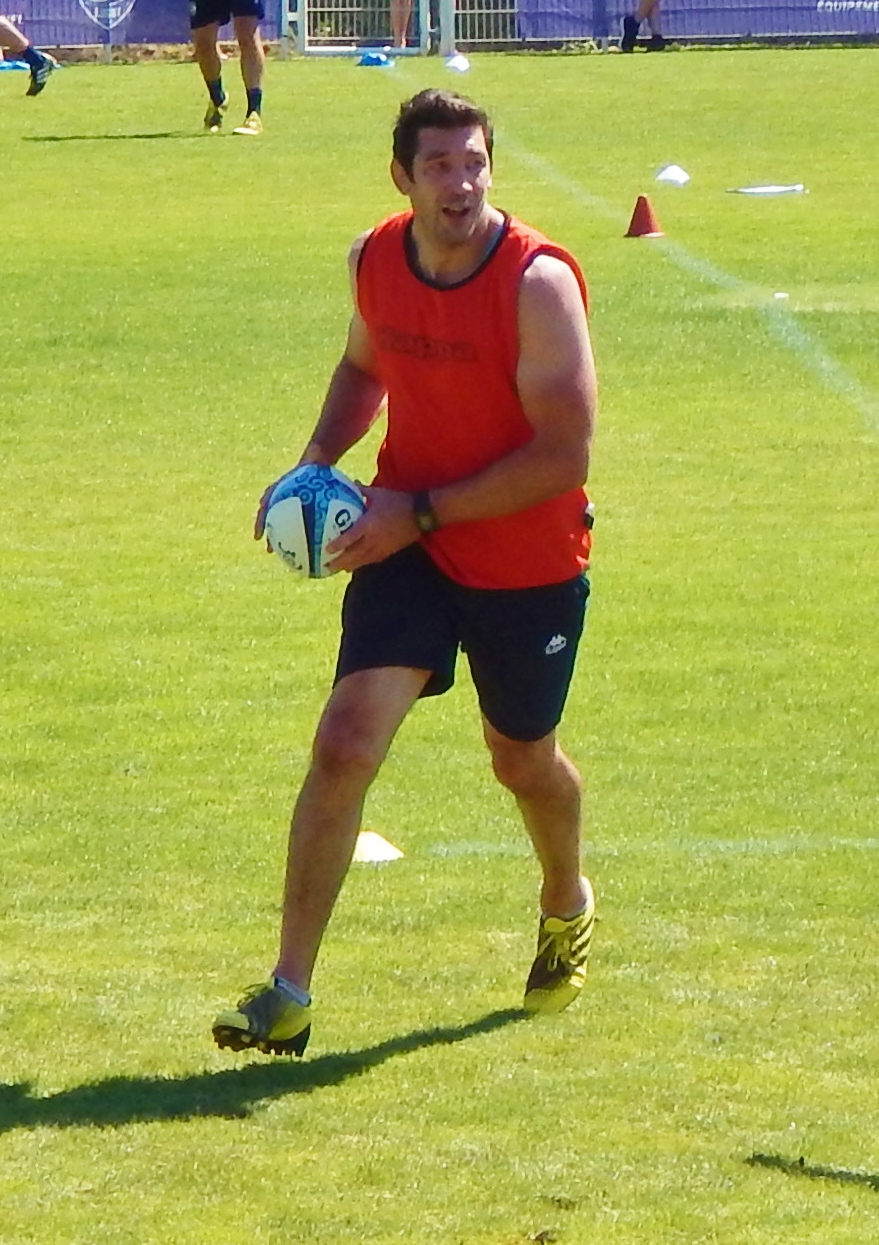
- Born: Nathan John Hines; 29 March 1976 (age 50) Wagga Wagga, New South Wales, Australia
- Height: 2.01 m (6 ft 7 in)
- Weight: 116 kg (18 st 4 lb; 256 lb)
- School: Berkeley Vale Community High School

Rugby union career
- Position: Lock
Amateur team(s)
Years	Team	Apps	(Points)
- Berkeley Vale Panther Junior
- Correct as of Ourimbah Razorbacks Rugby Union Club
Senior career
Years	Team	Apps	(Points)
1997–1998	North Sydney Bears		
1998–1999	Manly		
- Gala
1999–2005	Edinburgh Rugby	77	(20)
2005–2009	USA Perpignan	109	(20)
2009–2011	Leinster	46	(5)
2011–2014	Clermont Auvergne	72	(0)
2014–2015	Sale Sharks	15	(10)
- Correct as of 5 June 2014
International career
Years	Team	Apps	(Points)
2000–2011	Scotland	77	(10)
2009	British & Irish Lions	0	(0)
- Correct as of 19 October 2011
Coaching career
- Years: Team
- 2015–2017: Scotland (Resource coach)
- 2017-2020: Montpellier Rugby

Nathan Hines (born 29 November 1976) is an Australian-born former rugby union and rugby league footballer. He played at international level for Scotland, winning 77 caps, and at club level for Edinburgh, Perpignan, and Clermont Auvergne among others. He also played rugby league.

== Early life ==
Hines was born in Wagga Wagga, NSW. He attended Berkeley Vale Community High School from 1989 to 1994 and was a regular feature in the school's first XIII rugby league team. He played his club football for the Berkeley Vale Panthers Junior Rugby League Club and was part of the club's first ever Premiership winning side (U/15s – defeated Woy Woy in 1991) playing alongside future NRL player Paul Stringer.

Hines attended Berkeley Vale Community High School, from 1989 to 1994 with Stringer where they played in the first XIII together. This is the same school that produced Wallaby star Adam Ashley-Cooper and Olympic marathon runner and City to Surf winner Martin Dent. Hines was also part of the Premiership winning Ourimbah Razorbacks U/19s Rugby Union side, the same club where Ashley-Cooper also played.

== Club career ==
Hines won league and cup titles with Gala RFC, before signing for Edinburgh. He moved from Edinburgh to Perpignan in the 2005 off-season.

At the end of the 2008–09 Top 14 season, Hines chose to tour South Africa with the British & Irish Lions rather than take part in the Top 14 play-offs with Perpignan.

On 4 July 2009, it was reported in the French media that Hines would be joining 2008–09 Heineken Cup winners Leinster for the 2009–10 season. On the Lions tour, Hines played in five tour matches, but was not selected for any of the Tests against South Africa. Hines became a regular starter and a crowd favourite for Leinster, he won the 2010–11 Heineken Cup with the Irish province.

Hines signed for Clermont Auvergne in 2011. On 20 January 2014, Hines signed for Sale Sharks to compete in the English Aviva Premiership on a two-year contract from the 2014–15 season.

== International career ==
In 2000, Hines made his Test debut for Scotland in New Zealand but two serious injuries claimed nearly 18 months of his career. He qualified to play for Scotland through his grandfather George Nairne who was from Govan. He became the first Scotland player to be sent off in a Test match when he was dismissed against the USA Eagles in 2002 for punching replacement hooker/flanker Dan Anderson. He was a big part of the Scotland squad for the 2003 Rugby World Cup, which was held in his country of birth.

In the 2005 Six Nations Championship game against Wales at Murrayfield on 13 March, Hines came on in the second half and helped restore some pride, but his try was disallowed for lack of grounding. He was alleged to be discontented with the Scotland coaches (Matt Williams and Willie Anderson) and declared his retirement from international rugby. However, with the firing of the previous coaching regime and the appointment of his previous club coach, Frank Hadden, as Scotland coach, Hines returned to the squad. He made his reappearance as a substitute in the 2006 Six Nations win over England at Murrayfield. Hines toured South Africa with the British & Irish Lions in 2009 and featured heavily in the midweek matches but did not participate in the Tests.

On 9 November 2011 Hines announced his retirement from international rugby with immediate effect. This meant he started and ended his Scotland career at Eden Park, Auckland. Hines won a total of 77 caps and scored two tries (10 points).

== Coaching career ==
On 6 May 2015, Hines joined the Scotland coaching staff as a Resource Coach, reuniting with his former coach Vern Cotter.
