= 2002–03 Heineken Cup =

European club rugby union tournament

Tournament details
- Countries: England; France; Ireland; Italy; Scotland; Wales
- Tournament format(s): Round-robin and Knockout
- Date: 11 October 2002 – 24 May 2003

Tournament statistics
- Teams: 24
- Matches played: 79
- Attendance: 704,782 (8,921 per match)
- Top point scorer(s): Stephen Jones (Llanelli) (107 points)
- Top try scorer(s): Vincent Clerc (Toulouse); Garan Evans (Llanelli) (7 tries)

Final
- Venue: Lansdowne Road, Dublin
- Attendance: 28,600
- Champions: (France) Toulouse (2nd title)
- Runners-up: (France) Perpignan

The 2002–03 Heineken Cup was the eighth edition of the Heineken Cup. Competing teams from France, Ireland, Italy, Wales, England and Scotland, were divided into six pools of four, in which teams played home and away matches against each other. The pool winners and two best runners-up qualified for the knock-out stages.

== Teams ==
France	England	Wales	Scotland	Ireland	Italy
(France) Béziers; (France) Perpignan; (France) Bourgoin; (France) Montferrand; (France) Toulouse; (France) Biarritz Olympique	(England) Leicester Tigers; (England) Gloucester; (England) Sale Sharks; (England) Bristol; (England) London Irish; (England) Northampton Saints	(Wales) Neath; (Wales) Llanelli; (Wales) Swansea; (Wales) Newport; (Wales) Cardiff	(Scotland) Glasgow Rugby; (Scotland) Edinburgh Rugby	(Ireland) Munster; (Ireland) Leinster; (Ireland) Ulster	(Italy) Calvisano; (Italy) Viadana

== Pool stage ==
In the pool matches teams received

- 2 points for a win
- 1 points for a draw

=== Pool 1 ===
Team	P	W	D	L	Tries for	Tries against	Try diff	Points for	Points against	Points diff	Pts
(England) Leicester Tigers	6	5	1	0	31	6	25	232	71	161	11
(Wales) Neath	6	2	1	3	18	12	6	151	139	12	5
(Italy) L'Amatori & Calvisano	6	2	0	4	10	34	−24	105	236	−131	4
(France) Béziers	6	2	0	4	8	15	−7	109	151	−42	4

=== Pool 2 ===
Team	P	W	D	L	Tries for	Tries against	Try diff	Points for	Points against	Points diff	Pts
(France) Perpignan	6	4	0	2	23	16	7	176	156	20	8
(Ireland) Munster	6	4	0	2	27	14	13	206	107	99	8
(England) Gloucester	6	4	0	2	31	14	17	241	140	101	8
(Italy) Arix Viadana	6	0	0	6	15	52	−37	128	348	−220	0

=== Pool 3 ===
Team	P	W	D	L	Tries for	Tries against	Try diff	Points for	Points against	Points diff	Pts
(Wales) Llanelli	6	5	0	1	22	16	6	201	130	71	10
(France) Bourgoin	6	4	0	2	21	14	7	190	142	48	8
(Scotland) Glasgow Rugby	6	2	0	4	9	23	−14	86	185	−99	4
(England) Sale Sharks	6	1	0	5	16	15	1	123	143	−20	2

=== Pool 4 ===
Team	P	W	D	L	Tries for	Tries against	Try diff	Points for	Points against	Points diff	Pts
(Ireland) Leinster	6	6	0	0	22	7	15	188	93	95	12
(England) Bristol Shoguns	6	3	0	3	15	17	−2	149	144	5	6
(France) Montferrand	6	2	0	4	15	8	7	141	120	21	4
(Wales) Swansea	6	1	0	5	8	28	−20	109	230	−121	2

=== Pool 5 ===
Team	P	W	D	L	Tries for	Tries against	Try diff	Points for	Points against	Points diff	Pts
(France) Toulouse	6	5	0	1	29	9	20	241	118	123	10
(England) London Irish	6	3	0	3	12	13	−1	158	118	40	6
(Scotland) Edinburgh Rugby	6	2	0	4	15	19	−4	125	188	−63	4
(Wales) Newport	6	2	0	4	11	26	−15	117	217	−100	4

=== Pool 6 ===
Team	P	W	D	L	Tries for	Tries against	Try diff	Points for	Points against	Points diff	Pts
(England) Northampton Saints	6	4	0	2	21	10	11	172	110	62	8
(France) Biarritz Olympique	6	4	0	2	14	5	9	138	73	65	8
(Ireland) Ulster	6	4	0	2	8	8	0	116	106	10	8
(Wales) Cardiff	6	0	0	6	6	26	−20	78	215	−137	0

== Seeding ==
Seed	Pool Winners	Pts	TF	+/−
1	(Ireland) Leinster	12	22	+95
2	(England) Leicester Tigers	11	31	+161
3	(France) Toulouse	10	29	+123
4	(Wales) Llanelli	10	22	+71
5	(France) Perpignan	8	31	+101
6	(England) Northampton Saints	8	21	+62
Seed	Pool Runners-up	Pts	TF	+/−
7	(Ireland) Munster	8	27	+99
8	(France) Biarritz Olympique	8	14	+65
–	(France) Bourgoin	8	21	+48
–	(England) Bristol Shoguns	6	15	+5
–	(England) London Irish	6	12	+40
–	(Wales) Neath	5	18	+12

== Knockout stage ==
=== Quarter-finals ===
12 April 2003
14:45

Toulouse (France)	32–16	(England) Northampton Saints

Stade Municipal
Attendance: 36,500

12 April 2003
15:35

Leinster (Ireland)	18–13	(France) Biarritz

Lansdowne Road
Attendance: 46,000

13 April 2003
16:00

Leicester Tigers (England)	7–20	(Ireland) Munster
	Report

Welford Road
Attendance: 17,500

16 April 2003
19:30

Llanelli (Wales)	19–26	(France) Perpignan

Stradey Park
Attendance: 10,800

=== Semi-finals ===
26 April 2003
15:35

Toulouse (France)	13–12	(Ireland) Munster
	Report

Stade Municipal
Attendance: 36,500

27 April 2003
14:45

Leinster (Ireland)	14–21	(France) Perpignan

Lansdowne Road
Attendance: 37,000

=== Final ===
24 May 2003
15:00

Toulouse (France)	22–17	(France) Perpignan
Try: Clerc 33' c Con: Delaigue; Pen: Delaigue (5) 3', 18', 27', 40', 80+1'	Report	Try: Bomati 80+4' m Pen: Edmonds (4) 44', 51', 57', 70'

Lansdowne Road, Dublin
Attendance: 28,600
Referee: Chris White (England) (substituted off) 12'
Tony Spreadbury (England) (substituted in) 12'

Toulouse became the second team to win the competition more than once.
