= Simon Taylor (rugby union) =

British Lions & Scotland international rugby union player

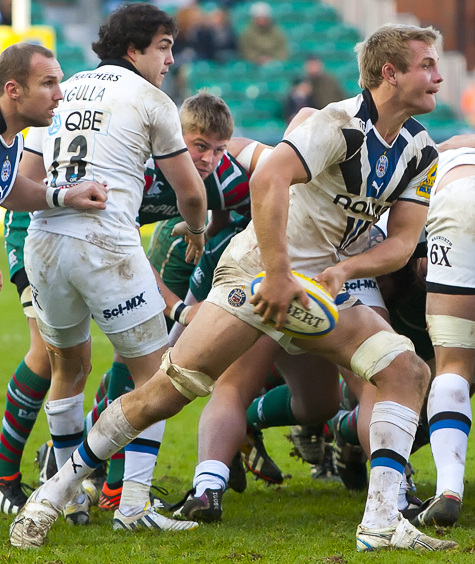
- Born: Simon Marcus Taylor; 17 August 1979 (age 47) Stirling, Scotland
- Height: 1.93 m (6 ft 4 in)
- Weight: 112 kg (17 st 9 lb)
- University: Edinburgh University

Rugby union career
- Position(s): Number eight, Flanker, Lock
Senior career
Years	Team	Apps	(Points)
2000–2007	Edinburgh	45	(25)
2007–2010	Stade Français Paris	53	(0)
2010–2013	Bath Rugby	67	(15)
- Correct as of 18 May 2013
International career
Years	Team	Apps	(Points)
2000–2009	Scotland	66	(30)
2001, 2005	British & Irish Lions		
2013	Bermuda Select XV		
- Correct as of 21 Mar 2009
National sevens team
Years	Team		Comps
2002	Scotland		
- Correct as of 14 Sept 2006

Simon Marcus Taylor (born 17 August 1979) is a Scottish retired professional rugby union footballer who played for Bath Rugby, Stade Français Paris and Edinburgh Rugby. He played as a back-row forward, usually a number eight. He played for Edinburgh for six seasons between 2000 and 2006 and in 2007 agreed a three-year deal with Stade Français Paris joining them immediately after the 2007 World Cup. In the summer of 2010, Taylor signed for Bath Rugby in the English Aviva Premiership. He also represented Scotland and the British and Irish Lions. At the start of his rugby career, he played for Heriot's Former Pupils.

== Career ==
=== Early career ===
Born in Stirling, Taylor represented Scottish Schools in 1995–96 while he was at Morrison's Academy, and he went on to play for Scotland’s under-18, under-19, and under-21 teams. He had two seasons in the under-19 team, leading the Scots in the Junior World Championship in France in 1998.

After five matches for the national under-21 side in 1998–1999 he went on to play in ten more under-21 internationals in 1999–2000, including the victory over the New Zealand Youth at Jedburgh in December and the draw with Australia during the 2000 Southern Hemisphere Alliance tournament in New Zealand. In that latter match Taylor scored a try. In 1999–2000 he played a pivotal role in Heriot's FP’s second successive club championship and was rewarded with a professional contract with Edinburgh Reivers at the beginning of season 2000–2001.

=== 2000–2003 ===
Taylor made his first appearance for Scotland in the November 2000 Autumn Test against the USA. In summer 2001 he made a try-scoring debut for the British & Irish Lions in their 116–10 victory over Western Australia before a knee injury unfortunately ended his tour and he returned to Scotland to pass the final exams of his law degree at the University of Edinburgh.

He scored his first test try in the match against Canada on the 2002 tour in which he started at openside flanker and then made some pile-driving contributions when he was fielded at No 8 against the USA. He scored his first try in a Murrayfield Test match in Scotland’s 30–22 March 2003 win against Wales. He was named Lloyds TSB Man of the Match for his display against Italy in the 29–12 Scotland victory in February 2002.

On 26 May 2002, Taylor was selected to play for the Barbarians against England. He scored twice, but England won 53 to 29.

At the 2002 Commonwealth Games, Taylor was a member of the Scottish Sevens squad who won the Men's Bowl Competition Quarter Finals.

Taylor was named The Famous Grouse Scotland Player of the Season for 2002–2003, fitting reward for performances encapsulated by his heroic defensive contribution to the game against England when he made 23 tackles.

In the 2003 World Cup he started in every match.

=== 2004 ===
Taylor suffered a serious knee injury in the final game of the Six Nations in Ireland in 2004.

=== 2005 ===
Taylor was out for the best part of a year with a knee ligament injury and was unable to do any aerobic activity. He used the time to do some serious weight work and there is a general consensus that he is now about a stone and a half more than his official 17 stones.

He returned for the Scotland v Italy Six Nations fixture and lasted the pace well enough for most of the game. He looked more like his old self in the following game vs. Wales on 13 March 2005. After the tournament, he became one of only three Scots named to the Lions for their 2005 tour to New Zealand. In New Zealand he injured a hamstring and did not play a match.

=== 2007 ===
Agreed a three-year deal with Stade Français Paris. Despite residing in France, Taylor, with business partner Barrie Brown, managed a successful foray into the licensed trade with 99 Hanover Street, a style bar in Edinburgh's city centre.

=== 2008 ===
With Taylor continuing his career in France the duo's new venture, Hawke and Hunter, opened in November 2008. Taylor and Brown trade as Brown Taylor Limited and Hawke & Hunter trades from the former Hallion Club on Edinburgh's Picardy Place.

=== 2010 ===
Having reportedly been unhappy with the number of players that play his position at Stade Français, Taylor signed a three-year deal with Bath Rugby. On 19 April 2013 Bath Rugby announced that Taylor was to be one of 7 players leaving the club at the end of the 2012/13 season. At that point, Taylor retired from Rugby and entered the hotel industry.
