= Andy Robinson =

England international rugby union player

Andy Robinson OBE
- Born: Richard Andrew Robinson; 3 April 1964 (age 62) Taunton, Somerset, England
- Height: 1.75 m (5 ft 9 in)
- Weight: 88 kg (194 lb; 13 st 12 lb)

Rugby union career
- Position: Flanker
Amateur team(s)
Years	Team	Apps	(Points)
- Loughborough Students
Senior career
Years	Team	Apps	(Points)
1986–1997	Bath Rugby	249	(186)
International career
Years	Team	Apps	(Points)
1988–1995	England	8	(4)
- Correct as of 22 October 2006
Coaching career
- Years: Team
- 1997–2000: Bath Rugby
- 2004–2006: England
- 2007–2009: Edinburgh Rugby
- 2007–2009: Scotland A
- 2009–2012: Scotland
- 2013–2016: Bristol
- 2019–2022: Romania

Richard Andrew Robinson OBE (born 3 April 1964) is an English rugby union coach and retired player. He was the director of rugby at Bristol until November 2016. He is the former head coach of Scotland and England. From September 2019 to December 2022, he was the head coach of the Romanian national team.

Robinson played as an openside flanker for Bath, England and the British & Irish Lions. He was head coach of England from October 2004 until November 2006, then coach of Edinburgh Rugby and joint coach of Scotland A between October 2007 and June 2009. On 4 June 2009 Robinson was named the new head coach of Scotland. He resigned on 25 November 2012 following a 21–15 defeat at home against Tonga.

== Playing career ==
Born in Taunton, Somerset, Robinson made his England debut against Australia on 12 June 1988, and gained eight caps, playing his last match on 18 November 1995 against South Africa. Robinson was quite small for a back row forward, being only 5 ft 9in (1.75 m), and weighing 13 st 12 lb (88 kg). He played 6 non-international games for the British & Irish Lions on their 1989 tour of Australia.

== Teaching ==
Whilst playing for Bath, Robinson taught mathematics, physical education and rugby at Writhlington School, King Edward's School, Bath and later Colston's Collegiate School in Bristol, where he and Alan Martinovic masterminded the school's Daily Mail Cup wins in 1995 and 1996. 'Robbo' then left to play rugby professionally with Bath.

== Coaching ==
Robinson later coached Bath before being appointed forwards coach of England and was deputy to Clive Woodward with the World Cup-winning England side in 2003. When Woodward resigned from the role of England coach in September 2004, Robinson was named as acting coach before being confirmed in the position. He was also a coach on the Lions tours to Australia in 2001 and New Zealand in 2005.

Robinson won just nine of his twenty two matches in charge of England. In November 2006, it was confirmed that Robinson would remain head coach with the position reviewed after the two tests against South Africa. Defeat in the second test increased demands from supporters that he should be replaced. On 29 November his resignation as head coach was announced, with Robinson blaming his lack of support from the RFU.

=== International matches as head coach with England ===
Note: World Rankings Column shows the World Ranking England was placed at on the following Monday after each of their matches

Matches (2004–2006)
Matches	Date	Opposition	Venue	Score (Eng.–Opponent)	Competition	Captain	World Rank
2004
1	13 November	Canada	Twickenham, London	70–0	Autumn internationals	Jason Robinson	3rd
2	20 November	South Africa	Twickenham, London	32–16	Autumn internationals	Jason Robinson	2nd
3	27 November	Australia	Twickenham, London	19–21	Autumn internationals	Jason Robinson	2nd
2005
4	5 February	Wales	Millennium Stadium, Cardiff	9–11	Six Nations	Jason Robinson	3rd
5	13 February	France	Twickenham, London	17–18	Six Nations	Jason Robinson	4th
6	27 February	Ireland	Lansdowne Road, Dublin	13–19	Six Nations	Jason Robinson	6th
7	12 March	Italy	Twickenham, London	39–7	Six Nations	Martin Corry	6th
8	19 March	Scotland	Twickenham, London	43–22	Six Nations	Martin Corry	6th
9	12 November	Australia	Twickenham, London	26–16	Autumn internationals	Martin Corry	5th
10	19 November	New Zealand	Twickenham, London	19–23	Autumn internationals	Martin Corry	4th
11	26 November	Samoa	Twickenham, London	40–3	Autumn internationals	Martin Corry	5th
2006
12	4 February	Wales	Twickenham, London	47–13	Six Nations	Martin Corry	5th
13	11 February	Italy	Stadio Flaminio, Rome	31–16	Six Nations	Martin Corry	3rd
14	25 February	Scotland	Murrayfield, Edinburgh	12–18	Six Nations	Martin Corry	4th
15	12 March	France	Stade de France, Paris	6–31	Six Nations	Martin Corry	5th
16	18 March	Ireland	Twickenham, London	24–28	Six Nations	Martin Corry	5th
17	11 June	Australia	Stadium Australia, Sydney	3–34	Australia test series	Pat Sanderson	6th
18	17 June	Australia	Docklands Stadium, Melbourne	18–43	Australia test series	Pat Sanderson	6th
19	5 November	New Zealand	Twickenham, London	20–41	Autumn internationals	Martin Corry	6th
20	11 November	Argentina	Twickenham, London	18–25	Autumn internationals	Martin Corry	6th
21	18 November	South Africa	Twickenham, London	23–21	Autumn internationals	Martin Corry	7th
22	25 November	South Africa	Twickenham, London	14–25	Autumn internationals	Martin Corry	6th

==== Record by country ====
Opponent	Played	Won	Drawn	Lost	Win ratio (%)	For	Against
Argentina	1	0	0	1	0	18	25
Australia	4	1	0	3	25	66	114
Canada	1	1	0	0	100	70	0
France	2	0	0	2	0	23	49
Ireland	2	0	0	2	0	37	47
Italy	2	2	0	0	100	70	23
New Zealand	2	0	0	2	0	39	64
Samoa	1	1	0	0	100	40	3
Scotland	2	1	0	1	50	55	40
South Africa	3	2	0	1	67	69	62
Wales	2	1	0	1	50	56	24
TOTAL	22	9	0	13	41	543	451

In the summer of 2007, the Scottish Rugby Union appointed Robinson the new head coach of Edinburgh Rugby, as well as joint coach of Scotland A with Glasgow coach Sean Lineen. In his first season as coach, he guided Edinburgh to the highest ever finish by a Scottish side at that time in the Celtic League (joint 3rd), despite numerous international players leaving the previous summer for more lucrative contracts in England and France. The following season (2008–09) Edinburgh leap-frogged Leinster and the Ospreys on the final day of the competition to finish runners-up behind Munster. Edinburgh also finished highest points scorers. He stepped down in June 2009 to take up the role of head coach of Scotland, replacing Frank Hadden. Although his time as Scotland coach included a 2–0 series win in Argentina and home wins over Australia and South Africa – the latter advancing Scotland to a record sixth place in the world rankings – his stint ended after a string of disappointing results, culminating in defeat by Tonga on 24 November 2012 which was followed a day later by his resignation.

=== International matches as head coach with Scotland ===
Matches (2009–2012)
Matches	Date	Opposition	Venue	Score (Sco.–Opponent)	Competition	Captain
2009
1	14 November	Fiji	Murrayfield Stadium, Edinburgh	23–10	Autumn internationals	Chris Cusiter
2	21 November	Australia	Murrayfield Stadium, Edinburgh	9–8	Autumn internationals	Chris Cusiter
3	28 November	Argentina	Murrayfield Stadium, Edinburgh	6–9	Autumn internationals	Chris Cusiter
2010
4	7 February	France	Murrayfield Stadium, Edinburgh	9–18	Six Nations	Chris Cusiter
5	13 February	Wales	Millennium Stadium, Cardiff	24–31	Six Nations	Chris Cusiter
6	27 February	Italy	Stadio Flaminio, Rome	12–16	Six Nations	Chris Cusiter
7	13 March	England	Murrayfield Stadium, Edinburgh	15–15	Six Nations	Chris Cusiter
8	20 March	Ireland	Croke Park, Dublin	23–20	Six Nations	Chris Cusiter
9	12 June	Argentina	Estadio José Fierro, Tucumán	24–16	Summer Tour	Alastair Kellock
10	19 June	Argentina	José María Minella, Mar del Plata	13–9	Summer Tour	Alastair Kellock
11	13 November	New Zealand	Murrayfield Stadium, Edinburgh	3–49	Autumn Internationals	Mike Blair
12	20 November	South Africa	Murrayfield Stadium, Edinburgh	21–17	Autumn Internationals	Rory Lawson
13	27 November	Samoa	Pittodrie Stadium, Aberdeen	19–16	Autumn Internationals	Rory Lawson
2011
14	5 February	France	Stade de France, Paris	21–34	Six Nations	Alastair Kellock
15	12 February	Wales	Murrayfield Stadium, Edinburgh	6–24	Six Nations	Alastair Kellock
16	27 February	Ireland	Murrayfield Stadium, Edinburgh	18–21	Six Nations	Alastair Kellock
17	13 March	England	Twickenham Stadium, London	16–22	Six Nations	Alastair Kellock
18	19 March	Italy	Murrayfield Stadium, Edinburgh	21–8	Six Nations	Alastair Kellock
19	6 August	Ireland	Murrayfield Stadium, Edinburgh	10–6	2011 RWC warm-ups	Rory Lawson
20	20 August	Italy	Murrayfield Stadium, Edinburgh	23–12	2011 RWC warm-ups	Alastair Kellock
21	10 September	Romania	Rugby Park Stadium, Invercargill	34–24	2011 Rugby World Cup	Alastair Kellock
22	14 September	Georgia	Rugby Park Stadium, Invercargill	15–6	2011 Rugby World Cup	Rory Lawson
23	25 September	Argentina	Wellington Regional Stadium, Wellington	12–13	2011 Rugby World Cup	Rory Lawson
24	1 October	England	Eden Park, Auckland	12–16	2011 Rugby World Cup	Alastair Kellock
2012
25	4 February	England	Murrayfield Stadium, Edinburgh	6–13	Six Nations	Ross Ford
26	12 February	Wales	Millennium Stadium, Cardiff	13–27	Six Nations	Ross Ford
27	26 February	France	Murrayfield Stadium, Edinburgh	17–23	Six Nations	Ross Ford
28	10 March	Ireland	Aviva Stadium, Dublin	14–32	Six Nations	Ross Ford
29	17 March	Italy	Stadio Olimpico, Italy	6–13	Six Nations	Ross Ford
30	5 June	Australia	Hunter Stadium, Newcastle	9–6	Summer Tour	Ross Ford
31	16 June	Fiji	Churchill Park, Lautoka	37–25	Summer Tour	Ross Ford
32	23 June	Samoa	Apia Park, Apia	17–16	Summer Tour	Ross Ford
33	11 November	New Zealand	Murrayfield Stadium, Edinburgh	22–51	Autumn Internationals	Kelly Brown
34	17 November	South Africa	Murrayfield Stadium, Edinburgh	10–21	Autumn Internationals	Kelly Brown
35	24 November	Tonga	Pittodrie Stadium, Aberdeen	15–21	Autumn Internationals	Kelly Brown

==== Record by country ====
Opponent	Played	Won	Drawn	Lost	Win ratio (%)	For	Against
Argentina	4	2	0	2	50	55	50
Australia	2	2	0	0	100	18	14
England	4	0	1	3	0	49	66
Fiji	2	2	0	0	100	60	35
France	3	0	0	3	0	47	75
Georgia	1	1	0	0	100	15	6
Ireland	4	2	0	2	50	67	79
Italy	4	2	0	2	50	62	49
New Zealand	2	0	0	2	0	25	100
Romania	1	1	0	0	100	34	24
Samoa	2	2	0	0	100	36	32
South Africa	2	1	0	1	50	31	38
Tonga	1	0	0	1	0	15	21
Wales	3	0	0	3	0	43	82
TOTAL	35	15	1	19	43	469	671

On 18 February 2013 it was announced by Bristol Rugby club that Andy Robinson was joining the club as the new director of rugby and in 2016 Bristol gained promotion to the Aviva Premiership under him.

== Personal life ==
Robinson is a vegetarian. He has four children; Olly Robinson who currently plays for the Cardiff Blues; Ed Robinson, who is assistant coach at Jersey Reds; Henry; and one daughter, Charlotte Robinson.

Robinson attended Loughborough University between 1982 and 1986. He received a BSc in Physical Education and Sports Science in 1985 and then PGCE the following year.

== Career record ==
Record as England player: Games played 8, Won 4, Lost 3, Drawn 1; 1 try (vs France)

Record as England head coach: Games coached 22, Won 9, Lost 13, Drawn: 0

- Biggest Win: Canada 70–0 (November 2004)
- Biggest Loss (home or away): Australia 34–3 (June 2006)
- Biggest Loss (home): New Zealand 20–41 (November 2006)

Record as Scotland head coach: Games coached 35, Won 15, Lost 19, Drawn 1

Sporting positions
Preceded by Lynn Howells	Edinburgh Rugby head coach 2007–2009	Succeeded by Rob Moffat
Preceded by (England) Clive Woodward	England national rugby union team head coach 2004–2006	Succeeded by (England) Brian Ashton
Preceded by (Scotland) Frank Hadden	Scotland national rugby union team head coach 2009–2012	Succeeded by (Australia) Scott Johnson
Preceded by (Romania) Marius Țincu (caretaker)	Romania national rugby union team head coach 2019–2022	Succeeded by (Romania) Eugen Apjok (caretaker)
