= 2010 June rugby union tests =

The 2010 mid-year rugby union tests (also known as the Summer Internationals in the Northern Hemisphere) refers to the rugby union Internationals that were played from late May to late June, mostly in the Southern Hemisphere.

For Australia, New Zealand and South Africa, the tests constituted preparation for the 2010 Tri Nations.

The first nation to announce its fixtures for this series was Australia, which unveiled its schedule on 21 September 2009.

South Africa announced its fixtures on 8 October 2009, but delayed announcing the venues since it simultaneously hosted the 2010 FIFA World Cup. FIFA regulations call for World Cup venues to be handed over to FIFA 15 days before the World Cup starts. FIFA also prohibits any other major sporting events from being held in host cities from 7 days before the opening of the World Cup and until 7 days after its end. An agreement was reached between the South African Rugby Union and the local World Cup organising committee to allow the match against France to be held at SARU's intended venue of Newlands in Cape Town, a non-World Cup venue in a World Cup city.

== Overview ==
=== Series ===
Series	Result	Winner
Australia–England Test series	1–1	drawn
New Zealand–Wales Test series	2–0	New Zealand
Scotland–Argentina Test series	2–0	Scotland
South Africa–Italy Test series	2–0	South Africa

=== Other tours ===
Team / Tour	Opponents
Barbarians	England (lost) – Ireland (won)
France	South Africa (lost) – Argentina (lost)

== Matches ==
=== Week 1 ===
30 May 2010
17:00 WEST/GMT+01 (UTC+01)

England	35–26	Barbarians
Try: Haskell 13' c Hape 23' c Foden 36' m Tindall 45' c Con: Hodgson (2/2); Barkley (1/2); Pen: Hodgson (2); Barkley	Report	Try: Sackey (2) 34' c, 75' c D. Smith 55' c Johnston 64' m Con: Élissalde (3/4)

Twickenham Stadium, London
Attendance: 41,035
Referee: Jérôme Garces (France)

FB	15	Ben Foden
RW	14	Mark Cueto
OC	13	Mike Tindall
IC	12	Shontayne Hape
LW	11	David Strettle
FH	10	Charlie Hodgson
SH	9	Danny Care
N8	8	Nick Easter (c)
OF	7	Steffon Armitage
BF	6	James Haskell
RL	5	Tom Palmer
LL	4	Dave Attwood
TP	3	Paul Doran-Jones
HK	2	Steve Thompson
LP	1	Jon Golding
Substitutes:
HK	16	Lee Mears
PR	17	Tim Payne
N8	18	Dan Ward-Smith
FL	19	Joe Worsley
SH	20	Joe Simpson
FH	21	Olly Barkley
CE	22	Mathew Tait
Team manager:
Martin Johnson

FB	15	(Australia) Paul Warwick
RW	14	(England) Paul Sackey
OC	13	(Samoa) Casey Laulala
IC	12	(France) Florian Fritz
LW	11	(France) Cédric Heymans
FH	10	(France) Jean-Baptiste Élissalde
SH	9	(New Zealand) Byron Kelleher
N8	8	(New Zealand) Xavier Rush (c)
OF	7	(Wales) Martyn Williams
BF	6	(Samoa) Rodney So'oialo
RL	5	(England) Ben Kay
LL	4	(South Africa) Ross Skeate
TP	3	(England) Julian White
HK	2	(France) Benoît August
LP	1	(Argentina) Rodrigo Roncero
Substitutes:
HK	16	(Wales) Ken Owens
PR	17	(Samoa) Census Johnston
LK	18	(France) Jérôme Thion
FL	19	(Australia) George Smith
SH	20	(France) Pierre Mignoni
CE	21	(France) Fabrice Estebanez
WG	22	(Samoa) David Smith
Coach:
(France) Philippe Saint-André

- As is typical for Barbarians matches, this was an uncapped match for England.

=== Week 2 ===
4 June 2010
19:45 WEST/GMT+01 (UTC+01)

Ireland	23–29	Barbarians
Try: Ronan 40+2' c Buckley 60' c Con: O'Gara (2/2); Pen: O'Gara (3/4) 20', 47', 64'	Report	Try: Rush 34' m G. Smith 38' c Heymans 48' m Con: James (1/3); Pen: James (3/3) 12', 18', 30'; Élissalde (1/1) 57'

Thomond Park, Limerick
Attendance: 26,500
Referee: Romain Poite (France)

FB	15	Robert Kearney
RW	14	Shane Horgan
OC	13	Gavin Duffy
IC	12	Fergus McFadden
LW	11	Andrew Trimble
FH	10	Ronan O'Gara (c)
SH	9	Peter Stringer
N8	8	Chris Henry
OF	7	Niall Ronan
BF	6	John Muldoon
RL	5	Dan Tuohy
LL	4	Ed O'Donoghue
TP	3	Tony Buckley
HK	2	Seán Cronin
LP	1	Marcus Horan
Substitutes:
HK	16	Jerry Flannery
PR	17	Tom Court
LK	18	Mick O'Driscoll
FL	19	David Wallace
SH	20	Tomás O'Leary
FH	21	Johnny Sexton
CE	22	Paddy Wallace
Coach:
Declan Kidney

FB	15	(Australia) Paul Warwick
RW	14	(France) Cédric Heymans
OC	13	(Samoa) Casey Laulala
IC	12	(Fiji) Seru Rabeni
LW	11	(Samoa) David Smith
FH	10	(Australia) Brock James
SH	9	(France) Pierre Mignoni
N8	8	(Australia) George Smith
OF	7	(New Zealand) Xavier Rush (c)
BF	6	(Ireland) Alan Quinlan
RL	5	(Ireland) Malcolm O'Kelly
LL	4	(France) Jérôme Thion
TP	3	(Samoa) Census Johnston
HK	2	(South Africa) Schalk Brits
LP	1	(England) David Barnes
Substitutes:
HK	16	(France) Benoît August
PR	17	(England) Julian White
N8	18	(Samoa) Rodney So'oialo
FL	19	(Wales) Martyn Williams
SH	20	(New Zealand) Byron Kelleher
SH	21	(France) Jean-Baptiste Élissalde
CE	22	(France) Fabrice Estebanez
Coach:
(France) Philippe Saint-André

- As is typical for Barbarians matches, this was an uncapped match for Ireland.

5 June 2010
19:30 AEST (UTC+10)

Australia	49–3	Fiji
Try: Beale (2) 10' c, 77' c Brown 39' c Cooper 43' c Ioane (2) 50' c, 66' c Mitchell 63' c Con: Giteau (6/6); Cooper (1/1)	Report	Pen: Rawaqa (1/1) 27'

Canberra Stadium, Canberra
Attendance: 15,438
Referee: Peter Fitzgibbon (Ireland)

FB	15	Kurtley Beale
RW	14	Digby Ioane
OC	13	Rob Horne	20' to 31'
IC	12	Matt Giteau
LW	11	Adam Ashley-Cooper	(substituted off) 56'
FH	10	Quade Cooper
SH	9	Luke Burgess
N8	8	Richard Brown
OF	7	David Pocock	(substituted off) 61'
BF	6	Rocky Elsom (c)
RL	5	Nathan Sharpe
LL	4	Dean Mumm
TP	3	Salesi Ma'afu	(substituted off) 52'	(substituted on) 61'
HK	2	Huia Edmonds	(substituted off) 55'
LP	1	Ben Alexander	(substituted off) 61'
Substitutes:
HK	16	Saia Fainga'a	(substituted on) 55'
PR	17	Pekahou Cowan	(substituted on) 52'
LK	18	Mark Chisholm
FL	19	Matt Hodgson	(substituted on) 61'
SH	20	Josh Valentine
WG	21	Drew Mitchell	(substituted on) 20'	(substituted off) 31'	(substituted on) 56'
FH	22	James O'Connor
Coach:
(New Zealand) Robbie Deans

FB	15	Taniela Rawaqa
RW	14	Sireli Bobo
OC	13	Rupeni Caucaunibuca		(substituted on) 65'
IC	12	Saula Radidi		(substituted off) 54'
LW	11	Timoci Nagusa
FH	10	Waisea Luveniyali		(substituted off) 67'
SH	9	Emosi Vucago	(yellow card) 53' to 63'
N8	8	Jone Qovu
OF	7	Jimilai Nakaidawa	7' to 15'		(substituted off) 74'
BF	6	Anthony Wise		(substituted off) 54'
RL	5	Dominiko Waqaniburotu
LL	4	Seko Kalou
TP	3	Deacon Manu (c)
HK	2	Talemaitoga Tuapati		(substituted off) 74'
LP	1	Campese Ma'afu		(substituted off) 73'			(substituted on) 77'	(substituted off) 79'
Substitutes:
PR	16	Graham Dewes		(substituted on) 73'	(yellow card) 75' to 80'
HK	17	Viliame Veikoso		(substituted on) 74'
LK	18	Rupeni Nasiga		(substituted on) 54'
FL	19	Samu Bola		(substituted on) 7'	(substituted off) 15'	(substituted on) 74'	77' to 79'
SH	20	Vitori Buatava		(substituted on) 67'
WG	21	Nemani Nadolo		(substituted on) 65'
WG	22	Ropate Ratu		(substituted on) 54'
Coach:
Sam Domoni

5 June 2010
14:30 WEST/GMT+01 (UTC+01)

Wales	31–34	South Africa
Try: Hook 20' c Prydie 72' m A. W. Jones 77' c Con: S. Jones (2/3); Pen: S. Jones (3/3) 8', 18', 45'; Drop: Hook (1/1) 11'	Report	Try: Ndungane 30' m Potgieter 42' c de Jongh 59' c Con: Pienaar (2/3); Pen: Pienaar (4/4) 16', 23', 35', 74'; Steyn (1/1) 55'

Millennium Stadium, Cardiff
Attendance: 60,527
Referee: Alan Lewis (Ireland)

FB	15	Lee Byrne
RW	14	Leigh Halfpenny
OC	13	James Hook
IC	12	Jamie Roberts
LW	11	Tom Prydie
FH	10	Stephen Jones
SH	9	Mike Phillips
N8	8	Ryan Jones (c)
OF	7	Sam Warburton	(substituted off) 77'
BF	6	Jonathan Thomas
RL	5	Deiniol Jones	(substituted off) 57'
LL	4	Bradley Davies
TP	3	Adam Jones	(substituted off) 57'
HK	2	Matthew Rees
LP	1	Paul James
Substitutes:
HK	16	Huw Bennett
PR	17	John Yapp	(substituted on) 57'
LK	18	Alun Wyn Jones	(substituted on) 57'
FL	19	Rob McCusker	(substituted on) 77'
SH	20	Richie Rees
FH	21	Dan Biggar
CE	22	Andrew Bishop
Coach:
(New Zealand) Warren Gatland

FB	15	François Steyn	(substituted off) 75'
RW	14	Gio Aplon
OC	13	Jaque Fourie
IC	12	Juan de Jongh
LW	11	Odwa Ndungane	(substituted off) 33'
FH	10	Ruan Pienaar
SH	9	Ricky Januarie
N8	8	Joe van Niekerk
OF	7	Dewald Potgieter	(substituted off) 55'
BF	6	Francois Louw
RL	5	Victor Matfield
LL	4	Danie Rossouw	(substituted off) 76'
TP	3	BJ Botha	(substituted off) 57'
HK	2	John Smit (c)
LP	1	CJ van der Linde	(substituted off) 76'
Substitutes:
HK	16	Chiliboy Ralepelle	(substituted on) 76'
PR	17	Jannie du Plessis	(substituted on) 57'
LK	18	Alistair Hargreaves	(substituted on) 76'
N8	19	Ryan Kankowski	(substituted on) 55'
FH	20	Meyer Bosman
FB	21	Zane Kirchner	(substituted on) 75'
WG	22	Bjorn Basson	(substituted on) 33'
Coach:
Peter de Villiers

=== Week 3 ===
8 June 2010
18:00 AWST (UTC+08)

Australian Barbarians	28–28	England
	Report

Perth Oval, Perth
Attendance: 10,208
Referee: Stuart Dickinson (Australia)

12 June 2010
19:35 NZST (UTC+12)

New Zealand	66–28	Ireland
Try: C. Smith (2) 10' c, 47' c Read 21' c B. Franks 27' c Cowan (2) 30' c, 33' c S. Whitelock (2) 50' c, 78' c Tialata 65' c Con: Carter (7/7); Weepu (2/2); Pen: Carter (1/1) 4'	Report	Try: Tuohy 36' c O'Driscoll 54' c Bowe 60' c D'Arcy 75' c Con: O'Gara (3/3); Sexton (1/1)

Yarrow Stadium, New Plymouth
Attendance: 25,000
Referee: Wayne Barnes (England)

FB	15	Israel Dagg
RW	14	Cory Jane	(substituted off) 63'
OC	13	Conrad Smith
IC	12	Benson Stanley
LW	11	Joe Rokocoko
FH	10	Dan Carter	(substituted off) 54'
SH	9	Jimmy Cowan	(substituted off) 40'
N8	8	Kieran Read
OF	7	Richie McCaw (c)
BF	6	Jerome Kaino	(substituted off) 38'
RL	5	Anthony Boric
LL	4	Brad Thorn	(substituted off) 50'
TP	3	Owen Franks	(substituted off) 70'
HK	2	Keven Mealamu	(substituted off) 63'
LP	1	Ben Franks	(substituted off) 52'	(substituted on) 70'
Substitutes:
HK	16	Aled de Malmanche	(substituted on) 63'
PR	17	Neemia Tialata	(substituted on) 52'
LK	18	Sam Whitelock	(substituted on) 50'
FL	19	Victor Vito	(substituted on) 38'
SH	20	Piri Weepu	(substituted on) 40'
FH	21	Aaron Cruden	(substituted on) 54'
WG	22	Zac Guildford	(substituted on) 63'
Coach:
Graham Henry

FB	15	Rob Kearney		(substituted off) 70'
RW	14	Tommy Bowe
OC	13	Brian O'Driscoll (c)
IC	12	Gordon D'Arcy
LW	11	Andrew Trimble
FH	10	Ronan O'Gara		(substituted off) 70'	(yellow card) 24' to 34'
SH	9	Tomás O'Leary		(substituted off) 70'
N8	8	Jamie Heaslip	(red card) 15'
OF	7	David Wallace
BF	6	John Muldoon		(substituted off) 32'
RL	5	Mick O'Driscoll		(substituted off) 36'
LL	4	Donncha O'Callaghan
TP	3	Tony Buckley
HK	2	Seán Cronin		(substituted off) 79'
LP	1	Cian Healy		(substituted off) 77'
Substitutes:
HK	16	John Fogarty		(substituted on) 79'
PR	17	Tom Court		(substituted on) 77'
LK	18	Dan Tuohy		(substituted on) 36'
FL	19	Shane Jennings		(substituted on) 32'
SH	20	Eoin Reddan		(substituted on) 70'
FH	21	Johnny Sexton		(substituted on) 70'
FB	22	Geordan Murphy		(substituted on) 70'
Coach:
Declan Kidney

- Dan Carter became the fourth player in history to score 1,000 test points, after Jonny Wilkinson, Neil Jenkins and Diego Domínguez. He ended the day in third on the all-time list, surpassing Domínguez.
- Sam Whitelock (New Zealand) made his international debut.

12 June 2010
18:00 AWST (UTC+08)

Australia	27–17	England
Try: Elsom 17' c Cooper (2) 30' c, 56' c Con: O'Connor (3/3); Pen: O'Connor 72'; Cooper 78'	Report	Try: Penalty try (2) 53' c, 70' c Con: Flood (2/2); Pen: Flood 43'

Subiaco Oval, Perth
Attendance: 32,228
Referee: Nigel Owens (Wales)

FB	15	James O'Connor
RW	14	Digby Ioane
OC	13	Rob Horne
IC	12	Berrick Barnes
LW	11	Drew Mitchell
FH	10	Quade Cooper
SH	9	Luke Burgess
N8	8	Richard Brown
OF	7	David Pocock
BF	6	Rocky Elsom (c)
RL	5	Nathan Sharpe
LL	4	Dean Mumm
TP	3	Salesi Ma'afu
HK	2	Saia Fainga'a
LP	1	Ben Daley
Substitutes:
HK	16	Huia Edmonds
PR	17	James Slipper
LK	18	Mark Chisholm
FL	19	Matt Hodgson
SH	20	Will Genia
WG	21	Peter Hynes
FB	22	Kurtley Beale
Coach:
(New Zealand) Robbie Deans

FB	15	Ben Foden
RW	14	Mark Cueto
OC	13	Mike Tindall
IC	12	Shontayne Hape
LW	11	Chris Ashton
FH	10	Toby Flood
SH	9	Danny Care
N8	8	Nick Easter
OF	7	Lewis Moody (c)
BF	6	Tom Croft
RL	5	Tom Palmer
LL	4	Simon Shaw
TP	3	Dan Cole
HK	2	Steve Thompson
LP	1	Tim Payne
Substitutes:
HK	16	George Chuter
PR	17	David Wilson
LK	18	Courtney Lawes
FL	19	James Haskell
SH	20	Ben Youngs
FH	21	Jonny Wilkinson
CE	22	Mathew Tait
Team manager:
Martin Johnson

12 June 2010
14:00 SAST (UTC+02)

South Africa	42–17	France
Try: Spies 2' c Aplon (2) 7' c, 49' c Steenkamp 31' m Louw 75' c Con: Steyn (3/4); Pienaar (1/1); Pen: Steyn (3/3) 10', 23', 46'	Report	Try: Rougerie 28' c Andreu 79' c Con: Parra (1/1); Skrela (1/1); Pen: Parra (1/1) 40+3'

Newlands Stadium, Cape Town
Attendance: 46,885
Referee: Bryce Lawrence (New Zealand)

FB	15	Zane Kirchner		(substituted off) 61'
RW	14	Gio Aplon
OC	13	Jaque Fourie		30' to 35'
IC	12	Wynand Olivier		(substituted off) 61'
LW	11	Bryan Habana
FH	10	Morné Steyn		(substituted off) 65'
SH	9	Ricky Januarie
N8	8	Pierre Spies
OF	7	Francois Louw
BF	6	Schalk Burger		(substituted off) 50'	(substituted on) 57'	(substituted off) 60'
RL	5	Victor Matfield
LL	4	Danie Rossouw		(substituted off) 60'
TP	3	BJ Botha		(substituted off) 56'
HK	2	John Smit (c)		(substituted off) 40'
LP	1	Gurthrö Steenkamp
Substitutes:
HK	16	Chiliboy Ralepelle		(substituted on) 40'
PR	17	Jannie du Plessis		(substituted on) 56'
LK	18	Flip van der Merwe	(yellow card) 69' to 79'	(substituted on) 60'
FL	19	Dewald Potgieter		(substituted on) 50'	57' to 60'
SH	20	Ruan Pienaar		(substituted on) 65'
CE	21	Juan de Jongh		(substituted on) 61'
CE	22	Jean de Villiers		(substituted on) 30'	(substituted off) 35'	(substituted on) 61'
Coach:
Peter de Villiers

FB	15	Clément Poitrenaud		(substituted off) 71'
RW	14	Vincent Clerc
OC	13	David Marty		(substituted off) 78'
IC	12	Maxime Mermoz
LW	11	Aurélien Rougerie
FH	10	François Trinh-Duc
SH	9	Morgan Parra		(substituted off) 66'
N8	8	Julien Bonnaire
OF	7	Wenceslas Lauret		(substituted off) 52'
BF	6	Thierry Dusautoir (c)
RL	5	Romain Millo-Chluski		(substituted off) 52'
LL	4	Lionel Nallet
TP	3	Nicolas Mas
HK	2	Dimitri Szarzewski		(substituted off) 64'
LP	1	Thomas Domingo		(substituted off) 40'
Substitutes:
HK	16	Guilhem Guirado		(substituted on) 64'
PR	17	Jean-Baptiste Poux		(substituted on) 40'
LK	18	Julien Pierre		(substituted on) 52'
N8	19	Louis Picamoles		(substituted on) 52'
SH	20	Dimitri Yachvili	(yellow card) 74' to 80'	(substituted on) 66'
FH	21	David Skrela		(substituted on) 71'
WG	22	Marc Andreu		(substituted on) 78'
Coach:
Marc Lièvremont

12 June 2010
15:45 ART (UTC-03)

Argentina	16–24	Scotland
Try: Tiesi 3' m Leguizamón 30' m Pen: Contepomi (2) 12', 80'	Report	Pen: Parks (6) 6', 23', 39', 52', 68', 80+3'; Drop: Parks (2) 40+5', 75'

Estadio Monumental Jose Fierro, Tucumán
Attendance: 31,898
Referee: Dave Pearson (England)

FB	15	Martín Rodríguez
RW	14	Lucas Borges
OC	13	Gonzalo Tiesi
IC	12	Santiago Fernández
LW	11	Horacio Agulla
FH	10	Felipe Contepomi (c)
SH	9	Alfredo Lalanne
N8	8	Juan Martín Fernández Lobbe
OF	7	Juan Manuel Leguizamón
BF	6	Genaro Fessia
RL	5	Patricio Albacete
LL	4	Manuel Carizza
TP	3	Martín Scelzo
HK	2	Mario Ledesma
LP	1	Rodrigo Roncero
Substitutes:
HK	16	Agustín Creevy
PR	17	Marcos Ayerza
LK	18	Mariano Galarza
FL	19	Alejandro Campos
SH	20	Agustín Figuerola
FH	21	Ignacio Mieres
FB	22	Lucas González Amorosino
Coach:
Santiago Phelan

FB	15	Hugo Southwell
RW	14	Max Evans
OC	13	Nick De Luca
IC	12	Graeme Morrison
LW	11	Sean Lamont
FH	10	Dan Parks
SH	9	Rory Lawson
N8	8	Johnnie Beattie
OF	7	John Barclay
BF	6	Kelly Brown
RL	5	Alastair Kellock (c)
LL	4	Jim Hamilton
TP	3	Moray Low
HK	2	Ross Ford
LP	1	Allan Jacobsen
Substitutes:
HK	16	Scott Lawson
PR	17	Geoff Cross
LK	18	Scott MacLeod
FL	19	Alasdair Strokosch
SH	20	Mike Blair
FH	21	Phil Godman
FB	22	Jim Thompson
Coach:
(England) Andy Robinson

- Scotland become the first side to defeat Argentina in Tucumán.

=== Week 4 ===
15 June 2010
19:30 AEST (UTC+10)

Australian Barbarians	9–15	England
	Report

Central Coast Stadium, Gosford
Attendance: 9,053
Referee: Steve Walsh (Australia)

18 June 2010
19:35 NZST (UTC+12)

New Zealand Maori	31–28	Ireland XV
Try: Gear; Sweeny; Lowe; Con: McAlister (1/3); Ripia (1/1); Pen: McAlister (3/3); Ripia (1/1)	Report	Try: Wallace; Con: Sexton (1/1); Pen: Sexton (7/8)

Rotorua International Stadium, Rotorua
Attendance: 13,500
Referee: Mark Lawrence (South Africa)

19 June 2010
19:35 NZST (UTC+12)

New Zealand	42–9	Wales
Try: Mealamu 18' c Jane 31' m Carter (2) 52' c, 68' c Kahui 71' c Con: Carter (4/5); Pen: Carter (3/4) 24', 50', 63'	Report	Pen: Halfpenny (1/1) 15'; S. Jones (1/2) 34'; Drop: S. Jones 3'

Carisbrook, Dunedin
Attendance: 29,000
Referee: George Clancy (Ireland)

FB	15	Israel Dagg
RW	14	Cory Jane
OC	13	Conrad Smith
IC	12	Benson Stanley
LW	11	Joe Rokocoko
FH	10	Dan Carter
SH	9	Jimmy Cowan
N8	8	Kieran Read
OF	7	Richie McCaw (c)
BF	6	Victor Vito
RL	5	Anthony Boric
LL	4	Brad Thorn
TP	3	Owen Franks
HK	2	Keven Mealamu
LP	1	Ben Franks
Substitutes:
HK	16	Aled de Malmanche
PR	17	Tony Woodcock
LK	18	Sam Whitelock
FL	19	Adam Thomson
SH	20	Piri Weepu
FH	21	Aaron Cruden
CE	22	Richard Kahui
Coach:
Graham Henry

FB	15	Lee Byrne
RW	14	Leigh Halfpenny
OC	13	Andrew Bishop
IC	12	Jamie Roberts
LW	11	Tom Prydie
FH	10	Stephen Jones
SH	9	Mike Phillips
N8	8	Ryan Jones (c)
OF	7	Gavin Thomas
BF	6	Jonathan Thomas
RL	5	Alun Wyn Jones
LL	4	Bradley Davies
TP	3	Adam Jones
HK	2	Matthew Rees
LP	1	Paul James
Substitutes:
HK	16	Huw Bennett
PR	17	John Yapp
LK	18	Deiniol Jones
FL	19	Rob McCusker
SH	20	Tavis Knoyle
FH	21	Dan Biggar
CE	22	Jonathan Davies
Coach:
(New Zealand) Warren Gatland

- This was intended to be the last rugby test played at Carisbrook; however, the stadium would host the All Blacks' 2011 World Cup warm-up match against Fiji. Carisbrook's replacement, Forsyth Barr Stadium, ultimately opened in August 2011.

19 June 2010
20:00 AEST (UTC+10)

Australia	20–21	England
Try: Giteau (2) 21', 41'; Con: Giteau (2/2); Pen: Giteau (2/6) 7', 14'	Report	Try: Youngs 17' c Ashton 26' m Con: Flood (1/2); Pen: Flood (2/3) 2', 44'; Wilkinson (1/2) 51'

Stadium Australia, Sydney
Attendance: 48,392
Referee: Romain Poite (France)

FB	15	James O'Connor
RW	14	Drew Mitchell
OC	13	Rob Horne
IC	12	Matt Giteau
LW	11	Digby Ioane
FH	10	Quade Cooper
SH	9	Will Genia
N8	8	Richard Brown
OF	7	David Pocock
BF	6	Rocky Elsom (c)
RL	5	Nathan Sharpe
LL	4	Dean Mumm
TP	3	Salesi Ma'afu
HK	2	Saia Fainga'a
LP	1	Ben Daley
Substitutes:
HK	16	Huia Edmonds
PR	17	James Slipper
LK	18	Mark Chisholm
FL	19	Matt Hodgson
SH	20	Luke Burgess
FH	21	Berrick Barnes
CE	22	Adam Ashley-Cooper
Coach:
(New Zealand) Robbie Deans

FB	15	Ben Foden
RW	14	Mark Cueto
OC	13	Mike Tindall
IC	12	Shontayne Hape
LW	11	Chris Ashton
FH	10	Toby Flood
SH	9	Ben Youngs
N8	8	Nick Easter
OF	7	Lewis Moody (c)
BF	6	Tom Croft
RL	5	Tom Palmer
LL	4	Courtney Lawes
TP	3	Dan Cole
HK	2	Steve Thompson
LP	1	Tim Payne
Substitutes:
HK	16	George Chuter
PR	17	David Wilson
LK	18	Simon Shaw
FL	19	James Haskell
SH	20	Danny Care
FH	21	Jonny Wilkinson
WG	22	Delon Armitage
Team manager:
Martin Johnson

- This was England's first victory in the Southern Hemisphere since the 2003 Rugby World Cup.

19 June 2010
15:00 SAST (UTC+02)

South Africa	29–13	Italy
Try: Habana 17' c Louw 30' m Steyn 39' c Kirchner 48' c Con: Steyn (3/4); Pen: Steyn (1/1) 14'	Report	Try: Parisse 63' c Con: Bergamasco (1/1); Pen: Bergamasco (2/3) 12', 68'

Witbank Stadium, Witbank
Attendance: 12,560
Referee: Andrew Small (England)

FB	15	Zane Kirchner
RW	14	Gio Aplon
OC	13	Jean de Villiers
IC	12	Butch James
LW	11	Bryan Habana
FH	10	Morné Steyn
SH	9	Ricky Januarie
N8	8	Pierre Spies
OF	7	Dewald Potgieter
BF	6	Francois Louw
RL	5	Victor Matfield (c)
LL	4	Bakkies Botha
TP	3	Jannie du Plessis
HK	2	Chiliboy Ralepelle
LP	1	Gurthrö Steenkamp
Substitutes:
HK	16	Bandise Maku
PR	17	CJ van der Linde
LK	18	Alistair Hargreaves
N8	19	Ryan Kankowski
SH	20	Ruan Pienaar
CE	21	Juan de Jongh
WG	22	Bjorn Basson
Coach:
Peter de Villiers

FB	15	Luke McLean
RW	14	Kaine Robertson
OC	13	Andrea Masi
IC	12	Matteo Pratichetti
LW	11	Mirco Bergamasco
FH	10	Craig Gower
SH	9	Tito Tebaldi
N8	8	Sergio Parisse (c)
OF	7	Alessandro Zanni
BF	6	Simone Favaro
RL	5	Quintin Geldenhuys
LL	4	Valerio Bernabò
TP	3	Martin Castrogiovanni
HK	2	Leonardo Ghiraldini
LP	1	Salvatore Perugini
Substitutes:
HK	16	Fabio Ongaro
PR	17	Lorenzo Cittadini
LK	18	Marco Bortolami
FL	19	Paul Derbyshire
SH	20	Simon Picone
FH	21	Riccardo Bocchino
CE	22	Gonzalo Canale
Coach:
(South Africa) Nick Mallett

19 June 2010
15:45 ART (UTC-03)

Argentina	9–13	Scotland
	Report

Estadio José María Minella, Mar del Plata
Attendance: 16,821
Referee: Christophe Berdos (France)

FB	15	Martín Rodríguez
RW	14	Lucas González Amorosino
OC	13	Gonzalo Tiesi
IC	12	Santiago Fernández
LW	11	Horacio Agulla
FH	10	Felipe Contepomi (c)
SH	9	Agustín Figuerola
N8	8	Juan Martín Fernández Lobbe
OF	7	Juan Manuel Leguizamón
BF	6	Genaro Fessia
RL	5	Patricio Albacete
LL	4	Manuel Carizza
TP	3	Martín Scelzo
HK	2	Mario Ledesma
LP	1	Rodrigo Roncero
Substitutes:
HK	16	Agustín Creevy
PR	17	Marcos Ayerza
LK	18	Santiago Guzmán
FL	19	Alejandro Campos
SH	20	Nicolás Vergallo
CE	21	Rafael Carballo
WG	22	Lucas Borges
Coach:
Santiago Phelan

FB	15	Hugo Southwell
RW	14	Sean Lamont
OC	13	Max Evans
IC	12	Graeme Morrison
LW	11	Simon Danielli
FH	10	Dan Parks
SH	9	Rory Lawson
N8	8	John Barclay
OF	7	Johnnie Beattie
BF	6	Kelly Brown
RL	5	Alastair Kellock (c)
LL	4	Jim Hamilton
TP	3	Moray Low
HK	2	Ross Ford
LP	1	Allan Jacobsen
Substitutes:
HK	16	Scott Lawson
PR	17	Alasdair Dickinson
LK	18	Scott MacLeod
FL	19	Alasdair Strokosch
SH	20	Mike Blair
FH	21	Phil Godman
CE	22	Nick De Luca
Coach:
(England) Andy Robinson

- Scotland earn their first series win ever against Argentina.

=== Week 5 ===
23 June 2010
19:35 NZST (UTC+12)

New Zealand Māori	35–28	England
Try: Hosea Gear (3) 13', 42', 45'; Liam Messam 18'; Con: Luke McAlister (3) 15', 19', 44'; Pen: Luke McAlister 11'; Willie Ripia (2) 73', 75'	Report	Try: Steffon Armitage 4'; Danny Care 48'; Chris Ashton 40'; Con: Charlie Hodgson (2) 5', 39'; Pen: Charlie Hodgson (3) 2', 9', 34'

McLean Park, Napier
Attendance: 22,000
Referee: Craig Joubert (South Africa)

FB	15	Robbie Robinson
RW	14	Sean Maitland
OC	13	Dwayne Sweeney
IC	12	Luke McAlister
LW	11	Hosea Gear
FH	10	Stephen Brett
SH	9	Aaron Smith
N8	8	Liam Messam (c)
OF	7	Tanerau Latimer
BF	6	Karl Lowe
RL	5	Jarrad Hoeata
LL	4	Hayden Triggs
TP	3	Ben Afeaki
HK	2	Corey Flynn
LP	1	Clint Newland
Substitutes:
HK	16	Dane Coles
PR	17	Bronson Murray
LK	18	Isaac Ross
FL	19	Colin Bourke
SH	20	Ruki Tipuna
FH	21	Willie Ripia
CE	22	Jackson Willison
Coach:
Jamie Joseph

FB	15	Delon Armitage
RW	14	David Strettle
OC	13	Mathew Tait
IC	12	Brad Barritt
LW	11	Chris Ashton
FH	10	Charlie Hodgson
SH	9	Danny Care
N8	8	Phil Dowson
OF	7	Steffon Armitage
BF	6	Chris Robshaw (c)
RL	5	Geoff Parling
LL	4	Dave Attwood
TP	3	Paul Doran-Jones
HK	2	George Chuter
LP	1	David Flatman
Substitutes:
HK	16	Rob Webber
PR	17	Dan Cole
N8	18	Dan Ward-Smith
FL	19	James Haskell
SH	20	Ben Youngs
FH	21	Shane Geraghty
FB	22	Ben Foden
Team manager:
Martin Johnson

26 June 2010
19:35 NZST (UTC+12)

New Zealand	29–10	Wales
Try: Jane 24'; Cruden 80'; Con: Carter 25'; Weepu 80'; Pen: Carter (5) 13', 40', 44', 51', 55'	Report	Try: Roberts 77'; Con: James 78'; Pen: Halfpenny 3'

Waikato Stadium, Hamilton
Attendance: 20,000
Referee: Jonathan Kaplan (South Africa)

FB	15	Mils Muliaina
RW	14	Cory Jane
OC	13	Richard Kahui
IC	12	Benson Stanley
LW	11	Zac Guildford
FH	10	Dan Carter
SH	9	Jimmy Cowan
N8	8	Kieran Read
OF	7	Richie McCaw (c)
BF	6	Jerome Kaino
RL	5	Tom Donnelly
LL	4	Brad Thorn
TP	3	Neemia Tialata
HK	2	Keven Mealamu
LP	1	Tony Woodcock
Substitutes:
HK	16	Aled de Malmanche
PR	17	Owen Franks
LK	18	Sam Whitelock
FL	19	Adam Thomson
SH	20	Piri Weepu
FH	21	Aaron Cruden
WG	22	Rene Ranger
Coach:
Graham Henry

FB	15	Lee Byrne
RW	14	Leigh Halfpenny
OC	13	Jonathan Davies
IC	12	Jamie Roberts
LW	11	Tom Prydie
FH	10	Dan Biggar
SH	9	Mike Phillips
N8	8	Ryan Jones (c)
OF	7	Gavin Thomas
BF	6	Jonathan Thomas
RL	5	Alun Wyn Jones
LL	4	Bradley Davies
TP	3	Adam Jones
HK	2	Matthew Rees
LP	1	Paul James
Substitutes:
HK	16	Huw Bennett
PR	17	Craig Mitchell
LK	18	Deiniol Jones
FL	19	Rob McCusker
SH	20	Richie Rees
FH	21	Stephen Jones
WG	22	Will Harries
Coach:
(New Zealand) Warren Gatland

- This was referee Jonathan Kaplan's 17th game involving New Zealand, a new refereeing record for games involving any one country.

26 June 2010
20:00 AEST (UTC+10)

Australia	22–15	Ireland
Try: Burgess 17'; Cooper 39'; Pen: Cooper (2) 12', 33'; Giteau (2) 52', 61'	Report	Pen: Sexton (5) 2', 9', 22', 29', 35'

Lang Park, Brisbane
Attendance: 45,498
Referee: Bryce Lawrence (New Zealand)

FB	15	James O'Connor
RW	14	Drew Mitchell
OC	13	Rob Horne
IC	12	Matt Giteau
LW	11	Adam Ashley-Cooper
FH	10	Quade Cooper
SH	9	Luke Burgess
N8	8	Richard Brown
OF	7	David Pocock
BF	6	Rocky Elsom (c)
RL	5	Mark Chisholm
LL	4	Dean Mumm
TP	3	Salesi Ma'afu
HK	2	Saia Fainga'a
LP	1	Ben Daley
Substitutes:
HK	16	Huia Edmonds
PR	17	James Slipper
LK	18	Mitch Chapman
FL	19	Matt Hodgson
SH	20	Josh Valentine
FH	21	Berrick Barnes
FB	22	Kurtley Beale
Coach:
(New Zealand) Robbie Deans

FB	15	Rob Kearney
RW	14	Tommy Bowe
OC	13	Brian O'Driscoll (c)
IC	12	Paddy Wallace
LW	11	Andrew Trimble
FH	10	Johnny Sexton
SH	9	Tomás O'Leary
N8	8	Chris Henry
OF	7	Shane Jennings
BF	6	Niall Ronan
RL	5	Mick O'Driscoll
LL	4	Donncha O'Callaghan
TP	3	Tony Buckley
HK	2	Seán Cronin
LP	1	Cian Healy
Substitutes:
HK	16	Damien Varley
PR	17	Tom Court
LK	18	Dan Tuohy
FL	19	Rhys Ruddock
SH	20	Eoin Reddan
FH	21	Ronan O'Gara
FB	22	Geordan Murphy
Coach:
Declan Kidney

26 June 2010
15:00 SAST (UTC+02)

South Africa	55–11	Italy
Try: Steyn (2) 11' c, 30' c Spies 37' c du Plessis 51' c Habana 56' c Van der Merwe 60' c BJ Botha 70' c Con: Steyn (6/6); Pienaar (1/1); Pen: Steyn (2) 4', 20'	Report	Try: Sepe 65' m Pen: Bergamasco (2) 8', 14'

Buffalo City Stadium, East London
Attendance: 12,984
Referee: Andrew Small (England)

FB	15	Gio Aplon
RW	14	Jean de Villiers
OC	13	Jaque Fourie
IC	12	Juan de Jongh
LW	11	Bryan Habana
FH	10	Morné Steyn
SH	9	Ricky Januarie
N8	8	Pierre Spies
OF	7	Francois Louw
BF	6	Schalk Burger
RL	5	Andries Bekker
LL	4	Bakkies Botha
TP	3	Jannie du Plessis
HK	2	John Smit (c)
LP	1	Gurthrö Steenkamp
Substitutes:
HK	16	Chiliboy Ralepelle
PR	17	BJ Botha
LK	18	Flip van der Merwe
FL	19	Dewald Potgieter
SH	20	Ruan Pienaar
FH	21	Butch James
CE	22	Wynand Olivier
Coach:
Peter de Villiers

FB	15	Luke McLean
RW	14	Michele Sepe
OC	13	Gonzalo Canale
IC	12	Andrea Masi
LW	11	Mirco Bergamasco
FH	10	Marco Filippucci
SH	9	Simon Picone
N8	8	Sergio Parisse (c)
OF	7	Paul Derbyshire
BF	6	Steven Bortolissi
RL	5	Marco Bortolami
LL	4	Carlo Del Fava
TP	3	Lorenzo Cittadini
HK	2	Fabio Ongaro
LP	1	Salvatore Perugini
Substitutes:
HK	16	Leonardo Ghiraldini
PR	17	Franco Sbaraglini
LK	18	Quintin Geldenhuys
FL	19	Alessandro Zanni
SH	20	Samuele Pace
FH	21	Riccardo Bocchino
WG	22	Matteo Pratichetti
Coach:
(South Africa) Nick Mallett

- Springbok captain John Smit became the first rugby player to win 50 tests as captain.
- Bryan Habana scored his 38th test try, equalling the South African record of Joost van der Westhuizen.

26 June 2010
15:30 ART (UTC-03)

Argentina	41–13	France
Try: Fernández Lobbe 40' c Contepomi (2) 48' c, 68' c González Amorosino 58' m Con: Contepomi (3/4); Pen: Contepomi (5) 4', 8', 26', 37', 65'	Report	Try: Malzieu 53' c Con: Parra (1/1); Pen: Porical 2'; Parra 18'

José Amalfitani Stadium, Buenos Aires
Attendance: 32,460
Referee: Stuart Dickinson (Australia)

FB	15	Martín Rodríguez
RW	14	Lucas González Amorosino
OC	13	Gonzalo Tiesi
IC	12	Santiago Fernández
LW	11	Rafael Carballo
FH	10	Felipe Contepomi (c)
SH	9	Nicolás Vergallo
N8	8	Juan Martín Fernández Lobbe
OF	7	Alejandro Campos
BF	6	Genaro Fessia
RL	5	Patricio Albacete
LL	4	Manuel Carizza
TP	3	Martín Scelzo
HK	2	Mario Ledesma
LP	1	Rodrigo Roncero
Substitutes:
HK	16	Agustín Creevy
PR	17	Marcos Ayerza
PR	18	Juan Figallo
LK	19	Mariano Galarza
FL	20	Juan Manuel Leguizamón
SH	21	Agustín Figuerola
WG	22	Horacio Agulla
Coach:
Santiago Phelan

FB	15	Jérôme Porical
RW	14	Vincent Clerc
OC	13	Florian Fritz
IC	12	Lionel Mazars
LW	11	Julien Malzieu
FH	10	François Trinh-Duc
SH	9	Morgan Parra
N8	8	Julien Bonnaire
OF	7	Louis Picamoles
BF	6	Thierry Dusautoir (c)
RL	5	Lionel Nallet
LL	4	Pascal Papé
TP	3	Nicolas Mas
HK	2	Dimitri Szarzewski
LP	1	Fabien Barcella
Substitutes:
HK	16	Guilhem Guirado
PR	17	Jean-Baptiste Poux
LK	18	Julien Pierre
FL	19	Grégory Lamboley
SH	20	Dimitri Yachvili
FB	21	Clément Poitrenaud
WG	22	Aurélien Rougerie
Coach:
Marc Lièvremont

- This game was referee Stuart Dickinson's 50th test match.
- Argentina score their biggest win ever over France. The Pumas' previous record win over Les Bleus was their 34–10 win in the third-place game of the 2007 Rugby World Cup.
- Argentina captain Felipe Contepomi became the 18th player in history to amass 500 career test points.

== See also ==
- Mid-year rugby union test series
- 2010 end-of-year rugby union tests
- 2010 Asian Five Nations
- 2010 IRB Churchill Cup
- 2010 IRB Pacific Nations Cup
- 2010 IRB Nations Cup
