= 2008 Scotland rugby union tour of Argentina =

Summary
P	W	D	L
Total
2	1	0	1
Test match
2	1	0	1
Opponent
P	W	D	L
Argentina
2	1	0	1

Tour chronology
- ← 2006 South Africa 2012 Oceania →

The 2008 Scotland rugby union tour of Argentina was a series of matches played in June 2008 in Argentina by the Scotland national team. It consisted of two tests v. the Argentine side, with one win for both teams.

== Players ==
In May 2008, the Scottish Rugby Union announced the list of players to tour to Argentina:

=== Backs ===
- Chris Paterson (Gloucester)
- Hugo Southwell (Edinburgh Rugby)
- Simon Danielli (Ulster)
- Thom Evans (Glasgow Warriors)
- Ben Cairns (Edinburgh Rugby)
- Graeme Morrison (Glasgow Warriors)
- Andrew Henderson (Glasgow Warriors)
- Nick De Luca (Edinburgh Rugby)
- Dan Parks (Glasgow Warriors)
- Phil Godman (Edinburgh Rugby)
- Rory Lawson (Gloucester)
- Mike Blair (Edinburgh Rugby) (capt)

=== Forwards ===
- Allan Jacobsen (Edinburgh Rugby)
- Alasdair Dickinson (Gloucester)
- Ross Ford (Edinburgh Rugby)
- Dougie Hall (Glasgow Warriors)
- Euan Murray (Northampton Saints)
- Moray Low (Glasgow Warriors)
- Scott MacLeod (Llanelli Scarlets)
- Dave Callam (Edinburgh Rugby)
- Johnnie Beattie
- John Barclay
- Kelly Brown (all Glasgow Warriors)
- Ally Hogg (Edinburgh Rugby)
- Alasdair Strokosch (Gloucester)

== Summary ==
Complete list of matches played by Scotland in Argentina:

Test matches

#	Date	Rival	City	Venue	Score
1	7 June	Argentina	Rosario	Gigante de Arroyito	15–21
2	14 June	Argentina	Buenos Aires	José Amalfitani Stadium	26–14

Balance
Pl	W	D	L	Ps	Pc
2	1	0	1	41	35

== Match details ==
=== First test ===
7 June 2008

Argentina	21–15	Scotland
Try: Tejeda; Tiesi; Con: Todeschini; Pen: Todeschini (4)	report	Pen: Paterson (5)

Gigante de Arroyito, Rosario
Attendance: 33,000
Referee: Alan Lewis (Ireland)

Argentina	Scotland

Argentina			Scotland
Bernardo Stortoni	FB	15	FB	Chris Paterson
José María Núñez Piossek	W	14	W	Simon Danielli
Gonzalo Tiesi	C	13	C	Ben Cairns
(capt.) Felipe Contepomi	C	12	C	Graeme Morrison
Tomás de Vedia	W	11	W	Thom Evans
Federico Todeschini	FH	10	FH	Dan Parks
Nicolas Vergallo	SH	9	SH	Mike Blair (capt.)
Juan Manuel Leguizamón	N8	8	N8	Johnnie Beattie
Juan Martín Fernández Lobbe	F	7	F	Ally Hogg
Martín Durand	F	6	F	Alasdair Strokosch
Esteban Lozada	L	5	L	Scott Macleod
Ignacio Fernández Lobbe	L	4	L	Matt Mustchin
Santiago González Bonorino	P	3	P	Euan Murray
Alvaro Tejeda	H	2	H	Ross Ford
Marcos Ayerza	P	1	P	Allan Jacobsen
		Replacements
(substituted on) Pablo Gambarini	H	16		Dougie Hall
(substituted on) Juan Gomez	P	17	P	Alasdair Dickinson (substituted on)
James Stuart		18	L	Alastair Kellock (substituted on)
(substituted on) Alejandro Campos	F	19	F	Kelly Brown (substituted on)
Alfredo Lalanne		20	SH	Rory Lawson (substituted on)
Santiago Fernandez		21		Phil Godman
Hernán Senillosa		22	W	Simon Webster (substituted on)
		Coaches
(Argentina) Santiago Phelan				Frank Hadden (Scotland)

=== Second test ===
14 June 2008

Argentina	14–26	Scotland
Try: Agulla, I. Fernández Lobbe; Con: Todeschini (2)	report	Try: Ford, Morrison; Con: Paterson (2); Pen: Paterson (4)

José Amalfitani Stadium, Buenos Aires
Referee: A. Rolland (Ireland)

Argentina	Scotland

Argentina			Scotland
Bernardo Stortoni	FB	15	FB	Hugo Southwell
Lucas Borges	W	14	W	Simon Webster
Gonzalo Tiesi	C	13	C	Ben Cairns
(yellow card) (capt.) Felipe Contepomi	C	12	C	Graeme Morrison
Horacio Agulla	W	11	W	Chris Paterson
Federico Todeschini	FH	10	FH	Phil Godman
Nicolas Vergallo	SH	9	SH	Mike Blair (capt.)
Juan Manuel Leguizamón	N8	8	N8	Ally Hogg
Juan Martín Fernández Lobbe	F	7	F	John Barclay
Martín Durand	F	6	F	Alasdair Strokosch
Esteban Lozada	L	5	L	Scott Macleod
Ignacio Fernández Lobbe	L	4	L	Matt Mustchin
Santiago González Bonorino	P	3	P	Euan Murray
Alvaro Tejeda	H	2	H	Ross Ford
Marcos Ayerza	P	1	P	Allan Jacobsen
		Replacements
Pablo Gambarini		16	H	Dougie Hall (substituted on)
(substituted on) Juan Gomez	P	17	P	Alasdair Dickinson (substituted on)
(substituted on) James Stuart	L	18	L	Alastair Kellock (substituted on)
(substituted on) Álvaro Galindo	F	19	N8	Kelly Brown (substituted on)
Alfredo Lalanne		20	SH	Rory Lawson (substituted on)
(substituted on) Federico Martín Aramburú	C	21	FH	Dan Parks (substituted on)
(substituted on) Federico Serra Miras	FB	22	C	Nick de Luca (substituted on)
		Coaches
(Argentina) Santiago Phelan				Frank Hadden (Scotland)
