= 2008 Argentina rugby union tour =

- Manager: Alejandro Cubelli
- Coach: (Argentina) Santiago Phelan
- Tour captain: Felipe Contepomi
Summary
P	W	D	L
Total
3	1	0	2
Test match
3	1	0	2
Opponent
P	W	D	L
France
1	0	0	1
Italy
1	1	0	0
Ireland
1	0	0	0

The 2008 Argentina rugby union tour of Europe was a series of matches played in November 2008 in Europe by the Argentina national team. Coached by Santiago Phelan, the Argentine national side toured on France, Italy and Ireland playing a total of three matches thereof. Argentina beat Italy and lost to France and Ireland.

== Touring party ==
=== Coaching staff ===
- Head coach: Santiago Phelan
- Assistant coach: Fabián Turnes
- Assistant coach: Marcelo Reggiardo

=== Players ===
- Horacio Agulla (Brive)
- Patricio Albacete (Stade Toulousain)
- Rimas Álvarez Kairelis (Perpignan)
- Miguel Avramovic (Montauban)
- Marcos Ayerza (Leicester Tigers)
- Nicolás Bruzzone (San Isidro Club)
- Alejandro Campos (ASM Clermont Auvergne)
- Rafael Carballo (Castres Olympique)
- Mauro Comuzzi (Pucará)
- Felipe Contepomi (Leinster) (captain)
- Martín Durand (Champagnat)
- Juan Martín Fernández Lobbe (Sale Sharks)
- Santiago Fernandez (Hindú)
- Juan Figallo (Jockey Club Salta)
- Agustin Figuerola (C.A. San Isidro)
- Mariano Galarza (Universitario LP)
- Álvaro Galindo (Racing Metro)
- Eusebio Guiñazú (Agen)
- Juan Martín Hernández (Stade Français Paris)
- Mario Ledesma (ASM Clermont Auvergne)
- Juan Manuel Leguizamón (Stade Français Paris)
- Francisco Leonelli (Saracens)
- Esteban Lozada (Toulon)
- Federico Martín Aramburú (Dax)
- Juan Pablo Orlandi (Rovigo)
- Rodrigo Roncero (Stade Français Paris)
- Bernardo Stortoni (Glasgow Warriors)
- Gonzalo Tiesi (Harlequins)
- Nicolas Vergallo (Dax)
- Alberto Vernet Basualdo (Stade Toulousain)

== Match summary ==
Date	Rival	Score	Venue	City	Ref.
8 Nov	France	6–12	Vélodrome	Marseille	
15 Nov	Italy	22–14	Olympic Stadium	Turin	
22 Nov	Ireland	3–17	Croke Park	Dublin	

== Match details ==
8 November 2008

France	12–6	Argentina
Pen: Skrela 29', 79', Baby 32'; Drop: Skrela 11'	Report	Pen: Contempomi 27' 36'

Vélodrome, Marseille
Attendance: 57.000
Referee: Jonathan Kaplan (South Africa)

Team details

France
Argentina

France			Argentina
(substituted off) 72' Maxime Medard	FB	15	FB	Bernardo Stortoni
Julien Malzieu	W	14	W	Francisco Leonelli
Yannick Jauzion	C	13	C	Gonzalo Tiesi (substituted off) 41'
Benoit Baby	C	12	C	Felipe Contepomi (capt.)
Cédric Heymans	W	11	W	Horacio Agulla
David Skrela	FH	10	FH	Juan Martín Hernández
(substituted off) 72' Jean-Baptiste Élissalde	SH	9	SH	Nicolas Vergallo
(substituted off) 68' Louis Picamoles	N8	8	N8	Juan Martín Fernández Lobbe
Imanol Harinordoquy	F	7	F	Álvaro Galindo (substituted off) 50'
Thierry Dusautoir	F	6	F	Martín Durand 32' to 36'
(substituted off) 56' (capt.) Lionel Nallet	L	5	L	Patricio Albacete
Romain Millo-Chluski	L	4	L	Rimas Álvarez Kairelis 67' to 68'
(substituted off) 47' Benoit Lecouls	P	3	P	Juan Pablo Orlandi (substituted off) 58'
(substituted off) 54' Dimitri Szarzewski	H	2	H	Mario Ledesma
Fabien Barcella	P	1	P	Rodrigo Roncero
		Replacements
(substituted on) 54' Benjamin Kayser	H	16		Alberto Vernet Basualdo
(substituted on) 47' Nicolas Mas	P	17	P	Marcos Ayerza (substituted on) 58'
(substituted on) 56' Sébastien Chabal	L	18	F	Esteban Lozada (substituted on) 50'
(substituted on) 68' Fulgence Ouedraogo	N8	19	F	Alejandro Campos (substituted on) (substituted off) 32-36 and 67'-68'
(substituted on) 72' Morgan Parra	SH	20		Agustin Figuerola
Damien Traille		21	C	Federico Martín Aramburú (substituted on) 41'
(substituted on) 72' Alexis Palisson	FB	22		Rafael Carballo
		Coaches
(France) Marc Lièvremont				Santiago Phelan (Argentina)

15 November 2008

Italy	14–22	Argentina
Try: Masi 79'; Pen: Marcato 30', 54'; Drop: Marcato 45'	Report	Try: Carballo 51'; Con: Contemponi 51'; Pen: Contepomi 25', 39', 40', 44', 75'

Olympic Stadium, Turin
Attendance: 28.000
Referee: Chris White (England)

Team details

Italy
Argentina

Italy			Argentina
Andrea Masi	FB	15	FB	Bernardo Stortoni
Kaine Robertson	W	14	W	Federico Martín Aramburú (substituted off) 75'
Matteo Pratichetti	C	13	C	Gonzalo Tiesi (substituted off) 60'
Gonzalo Garcia	C	12	C	Felipe Contepomi (capt.)
Mirco Bergamasco	W	11	W	Rafael Carballo (yellow card) 79' to 80'
(substituted off) 62' Andrea Marcato	FH	10	FH	Juan Martín Hernández
(substituted off) 51' Pablo Canavosio	SH	9	SH	Nicolas Vergallo (substituted off) 60'
(capt.) Sergio Parisse	N8	8	N8	Juan Martín Fernández Lobbe
Mauro Bergamasco	F	7	F	Rimas Álvarez Kairelis
Josh Sole	F	6	F	Martín Durand (substituted on) (substituted off) 48'-56' (substituted off) 64'
43' to 48' Marco Bortolami	L	5	L	Patricio Albacete
(substituted off) 66' Carlo Del Fava	L	4	L	Esteban Lozada (substituted off) 58'
(substituted off) 70' Carlos Nieto	P	3	P	Juan Pablo Orlandi (substituted off) 69'
(substituted off) 64' Fabio Ongaro	H	2	H	Mario Ledesma (substituted off) 77'
(substituted off) 52' Matías Agüero	P	1	P	Rodrigo Roncero (yellow card) 56' to 66'
		Replacements
(substituted on) 64' Leonardo Ghiraldini	H	16	H	Alberto Vernet Basualdo (substituted on) 77'
(substituted on) 52' Andrea Lo Cicero	P	17	P	Marcos Ayerza (substituted on) (substituted off) 48'-56' (substituted on) 69'
(substituted on) 70' Salvatore Perugini	P	18	L	Álvaro Galindo (substituted on) 58'
(substituted on) (substituted off) 43'-48' (substituted on) 66' Tommaso Reato	L	19	F	Alejandro Campos (substituted on) 64'
(substituted on) 51' Pietro Travagli	SH	20	SH	Agustin Figuerola (substituted on) 60'
(substituted on) 62' Luciano Orquera	FH	21	W	Santiago Fernandez (substituted on) 75'
Luke McLean		22	C	Horacio Agulla (substituted on) 60'
		Coaches
(South Africa) Nick Mallett				Santiago Phelan (Argentina)

22 November 2008

Ireland	17–3	Argentina
Try: Bowe 76'; Pen: O'Gara 38' 46' 74'; Drop: O' Gara 68'	report	Con: Fernandez 36'

Croke Park, Dublin
Attendance: 68.000
Referee: Bryce Lawrence (New Zealand)

Team details

Ireland
Argentina

Ireland			Argentina
Geordan Murphy	FB	15	FB	Horacio Agulla
Tommy Bowe	W	14	W	Francisco Leonelli (substituted off) 68'
(capt.) Brian O'Driscoll	C	13	C	Federico Martín Aramburú
Luke Fitzgerald	C	12	C	Miguel Avramovic
Rob Kearney	W	11	W	Rafael Carballo
Ronan O'Gara	FH	10	FH	Santiago Fernandez
Tomás O'Leary	SH	9	SH	Nicolas Vergallo (substituted off) 68'
Jamie Heaslip	N8	8	N8	Juan Manuel Leguizamón
(substituted off) 75' David Wallace	F	7	F	Juan Martín Fernández Lobbe
Stephen Ferris	F	6	F	Martín Durand
Paul O'Connell	L	5	L	Patricio Albacete
Donncha O'Callaghan	L	4	L	Rimas Álvarez Kairelis (substituted off) 55'
John Hayes	P	3	P	Juan Pablo Orlandi (substituted off) 48'
(substituted off) 13' Jerry Flannery	H	2	H	Mario Ledesma
Marcus Horan	P	1	P	Rodrigo Roncero (yellow card) 78' to 80'
		Replacements
(substituted on) 13' Rory Best	H	16		Alberto Vernet Basualdo
Tony Buckley		17	P	Marcos Ayerza (substituted on) 48'
Malcolm O'Kelly		18	L	Esteban Lozada (substituted on) 55'
(substituted on) 75' Donnacha Ryan	F	19		Álvaro Galindo
Eoin Reddan		20	SH	Agustin Figuerola (substituted on) 68'
Paddy Wallace		21		Mauro Comuzzi
Keith Earls		22	W	Bernardo Stortoni (substituted on) 60'
		Coaches
(Ireland) Declan Kidney				Santiago Phelan (Argentina)
