= 2008 Italy rugby union tour =

Summary
P	W	D	L
Total
2	1	0	1
Test match
2	1	0	1
Opponent
P	W	D	L
South Africa
1	0	0	1
Argentina
1	1	0	0

The 2008 Italy rugby union tour of South Africa and Argentina was a series of matches played in June 2008 in South Africa and Argentina by Italy national rugby union team.

The "Azzurri" lost heavily the first a match against "Springboks", and won afgainst the "Pumas”

== Results ==
=== First test ===
21 June 2008

South Africa	26–0	Italy
Try: Steyn 6' du Plessis 16' 43'; Mtawarira 56'	report

Newlands, Cape Town
Attendance: 37,000
Referee: Clancy

(substituted off) 57' Conrad Jantjes	FB	15	FB	Andrea Marcato (substituted off) 67'
Odwa Ndungane	W	14	W	Kaine Robertson
Gcobani Bobo	C	13	C	Andrea Masi (substituted off) 36'
Jean de Villiers	C	12	C	Gonzalo Garcia (substituted off) 67'
Bryan Habana	W	11	W	Matteo Pratichetti
Frans Steyn	FH	10	FH	Luke McLean
(substituted off) 65' Ricky Januarie	SH	9	SH	Simon Picone (substituted off) 63'
(substituted off) 36' Ryan Kankowski	N8	8	N8	Josh Sole
Juan Smith	F	7	F	Robert Barbieri
(substituted off) 56' Luke Watson	F	6	F	Alessandro Zanni
(capt.) Victor Matfield	L	5	L	Carlo Del Fava (yellow card) 36' to 46'
(substituted off) 64' Bakkies Botha	L	4	L	Santiago Dellapè (substituted off) 67'
(substituted on) (substituted off) 76'-80' (substituted off) 64' CJ van der Linde	P	3	P	Carlos Nieto
Bismarck du Plessis	H	2	H	Leonardo Ghiraldini (capt.) (substituted off) 67'
(substituted off) 76' Tendai Mtawarira	P	1	P	Michele Rizzo (substituted off) 47'
		Replacements
(substituted on) 65' Schalk Brits	H	16	H	Fabio Ongaro (substituted on) 67'
(substituted on) 64' Brian Mujati	P	17	P	Ignacio Fernandez Rouyet (substituted on) 47'
(substituted on) 64' Andries Bekker	L	18	L	Tommaso Reato (substituted on) 67'
(substituted on) 36' Joe van Niekerk	N8	19	C	Jaco Erasmus (substituted on) 67'
(substituted on) 56' Schalk Burger	F	20	SH	Pablo Canavosio (substituted on) 63'
(substituted on) 57' Peter Grant	FB	21	C	Enrico Patrizio (substituted on) 33'
(substituted on) 65' Ruan Pienaar	SH	22	FB	Riccardo Pavan (substituted on) 67'
		Coaches
(South Africa) Peter de Villiers				Nick Mallett (South Africa)

=== Second test ===
28 June 2008

Argentina	12–13	Italy
Pen: Hernández 2, Bosch 2	Report	Try: Ghiraldini; Con: Marcato; Pen: Marcato 2

Estadio José María Minella, Mar del Plata
Attendance: 45,000
Referee: M.Goddard

Argentina	Italy

Bernardo Stortoni	FB	15	FB	Andrea Marcato
Lucas Borges	W	14	W	Kaine Robertson
Marcelo Bosch	C	13	C	Mirco Bergamasco
Miguel Avramovic	C	12	C	Gonzalo Garcia
Horacio Agulla	W	11	W	Matteo Pratichetti
(substituted off) 18' Juan Martín Hernández	FH	10	FH	Luke McLean
Nicolas Vergallo	SH	9	SH	Simon Picone (substituted off) 66'
(substituted off) 57' Juan Manuel Leguizamón	N8	8	N8	Sergio Parisse (capt.)
Álvaro Galindo	F	7	F	Mauro Bergamasco
Martín Durand	F	6	F	Josh Sole (substituted off) 58'
Esteban Lozada	L	5	L	Carlo Del Fava
(substituted off) 76' Manuel Carizza	L	4	L	Santiago Dellapè (yellow card) (substituted off) 64'
(substituted off) 46' (yellow card) Juan Gomez	P	3	P	Carlos Nieto
Alvaro Tejeda	H	2	H	Fabio Ongaro (substituted off) 71'
(yellow card) (capt.) Rodrigo Roncero	P	1	P	Ignacio Fernandez Rouyet (substituted off) 66'
		Replacements
(substituted on) 46' Pablo Gambarini		16	H	Leonardo Ghiraldini (substituted on) 71'
Pedro Ledesma	P	17	P	Alejandro Moreno (substituted on) 66'
(substituted on) 76' James Stuart	L	18	L	Tommaso Reato (substituted on) 64'
(substituted on) 57' Alejandro Campos	N8	19	F	Alessandro Zanni (substituted on) 58'
Alfredo Lalanne		20	SH	Pablo Canavosio (substituted on) 66'
Federico Martín Aramburú	FH	21		Enrico Patrizio
(substituted on) 18' Hernán Senillosa		22		Jaco Erasmus
		Coaches
(Argentina) Santiago Phelan				Nick Mallett (South Africa)
