= 2008 end-of-year rugby union internationals =

2008 Results

The 2008 end of year rugby tests, also known as the Autumn internationals saw Australia, New Zealand, South Africa, Argentina, the Pacific Islanders and Canada tour the northern hemisphere. The tour ended with the traditional 'final challenge' Barbarians match, against Australia, which was the first rugby union Test at the new Wembley Stadium. New Zealand and Australia also contested a Bledisloe Cup match outside of either country for the first time; the match was played in Hong Kong with the hope of raising rugby's profile in China.

The test matches took on added significance, with seedings for the 2011 Rugby World Cup draw to take place on 1 December at stake. For the first time in the history of the Rugby World Cup, the International Rugby Board used the IRB World Rankings to seed teams in the World Cup draw. Teams will be assigned to four-strong seeding pots based on their rankings; each team within a pot will be drawn into a different pool for the World Cup finals.

New Zealand recorded a second straight grand slam tour.

== Overview ==
Team/Tour	Opponents
Argentina in Europe	France (lost) – Italy (won) – Ireland (lost)
Australia in Hong Kong and Europe	New Zealand (lost) – Italy (won) – England (won) – France (won) – Wales (lost)
New Zealand in Hong Kong and Europe	Australia (won) – Scotland (won) – Ireland (won) – Wales (won) – England (won)
South Africa in Great Britain	Wales (won) – Scotland (won) – England (won)
Pacific Islands in Europe	England (lost) – France (lost) – Italy (won)
United States in Japan	Japan (2 matches lost)
Canada in Europe	Portugal (won) – Ireland (lost) – Wales (lost) – Scotland (lost)
Georgia in Scotland	Scotland A (lost)

== Week 1 ==
1 November 2008
16:30 HKT (UTC+08)

Australia	14–19	New Zealand
Try: Mitchell (2) 7' c, 27' c Con: Giteau (2)	(Report)	Try: Sivivatu 42' m McCaw 63' m Pen: Carter (3) 14', 24', 32'

Hong Kong Stadium, Hong Kong
Attendance: 39,000
Referee: Alan Lewis (Ireland)

1 November 2008
17:00 WET/GMT+0 (UTC+0)

Portugal	13–21	Canada
Try: Silva; Con: Leal; Pen: Leal (2)		Try: Kleeberger; Pritchard; Con: Pritchard; Pen: Pritchard (3)

Estádio Universitário de Lisboa, Lisbon
Referee: Peter Allan (Scotland)

== Week 2 ==
8 November 2008
15:00 CET/GMT+01 (UTC+01)

Italy	20–30	Australia
Try: Mi. Bergamasco 30' m Pen: Marcato (2) 7', 12'; Orquera (2) 53', 60'; Drop: Marcato 26'	(Report)	Try: Turner 9' m Cooper 73' c Con: Giteau; Pen: Mortlock 3'; Giteau (5) 18', 39', 48', 51', 78'

Stadio Euganeo, Padua
Attendance: 35,000
Referee: Bryce Lawrence (New Zealand)

8 November 2008
14:30 BT/GMT+0 (UTC+0)

England	39–13	Pacific Islanders
Try: Sackey (2) 14' c, 75' m Cipriani 37' c Kennedy 44' c Mears 68' c Con: Cipriani (4); Pen: Cipriani (2) 10', 32'	(Report)	Try: Rabeni 15' c Con: Hola; Pen: Hola 40'; Bai 56'

Twickenham Stadium, London
Attendance: 55,427
Referee: Matt Goddard (Australia)

8 November 2008
14:30 BT/GMT+0 (UTC+0)

Wales	15–20	South Africa
Pen: Halfpenny 29'; Hook (4) 57', 59', 63', 73'	(Report)	Try: Jacobs 6' c De Villiers 52' c Con: Pienaar (2); Pen: Pienaar (2) 9', 37'

Millennium Stadium, Cardiff
Attendance: 74,119
Referee: Alain Rolland (Ireland)

8 November 2008
17:15 IST/GMT+0 (UTC+0)

Ireland	55–0	Canada
Try: Earls 3' c Kearney (2) 13' c, 35' c Heaslip 30' c Bowe (2) 40' c, 80' m D. Wallace 68' c Quinlan 80' m Con: O'Gara (5); P. Wallace; Pen: O'Gara 7'	(Report)

Thomond Park, Limerick
Attendance: 21,500
Referee: Christophe Berdos (France)

8 November 2008
17:15 BT/GMT+0 (UTC+0)

Scotland	6–32	New Zealand
Pen: Paterson (2) 2', 22'	(Report)	Try: Tuitavake 8' c Weepu 26' m Kahui 41' c Boric 73' c Con: Donald (2); Carter; Pen: Donald (2) 5', 19'

Murrayfield Stadium, Edinburgh
Attendance: 51,511
Referee: Wayne Barnes (England)

8 November 2008
21:00 CET/GMT+01 (UTC+01)

France	12–6	Argentina
Pen: Skrela (2) 29', 79'; Baby 32'; Drop: Skrela 11'	(Report)	Pen: Contepomi (2) 27', 36'

Stade Vélodrome, Marseille
Attendance: 57,300
Referee: Jonathan Kaplan (South Africa)

- Kaplan, who went into the match sharing the record for most Tests as referee (46) with Paul Honiss of New Zealand, took sole possession of the record. He replaced the injured Steve Walsh as referee for this match.

8 November 2008
16:00 MST (UTC-07)

United States	43–9	Uruguay
Try: Clever 3' c Wyles 52' c DeBartolo 56' c Ngwenya 59' c Emerick 76' c Erskine 80+2' m Con: Hercus (4); Malifa; Pen: Hercus 50'		Pen: Arocena (3) 10', 17', 21'

Rio Tinto Stadium, Sandy
Attendance: 5,060
Referee: Romain Poite (France)

== Week 3 ==
14 November 2008

Scotland A	69–3	Georgia
Try: Vernon (2); Evans; McMillan; Brown; Dewey; Webster; Walker; Henderson (2); Newlands; Con: Ross (5); Gregor (2)	ESPN Report; Daily Record	Pen: Barkalaia

Firhill Stadium, Glasgow
Attendance: 1,100
Referee: James Jones (Wales)

14 November 2008
19:30 BT/GMT+0 (UTC+0)

Wales	34–13	Canada
Try: Stoddart 24' m Halfpenny (2) 39' m, 80' c Penalty try (2) 58' c, 70' c Con: Biggar (3); Pen: Biggar 46'	(Report)	Try: Smith 74' c Con: Van Camp; Pen: Pritchard (2) 10', 31'

Millennium Stadium, Cardiff
Attendance: 59,326
Referee: Stuart Dickinson (Australia)

15 November 2008
15:00 CET/GMT+01 (UTC+01)

France	42–17	Pacific Islanders
Try: Tillous-Borde 24' c Szarzewski 27' c Heymans 46' m Picamoles 70' c Médard 75' c Con: Skrela (4); Pen: Skrela (3) 7', 50', 60'	(Report)	Try: Taione 77' m Pen: Bai (4) 2', 9', 34', 40'

Stade Auguste Bonal, Montbéliard
Attendance: 19,645
Referee: Nigel Owens (Wales)

15 November 2008
15:00 CET/GMT+01 (UTC+01)

Italy	14–22	Argentina
Try: Masi 80'; Pen: Marcato (2) 31', 53'; Drop: Marcato 44'	(Report)	Try: Carballo 49' c Con: Contepomi; Pen: Contepomi (5) 26', 38', 40+1', 43', 74'

Stadio Olimpico di Torino, Turin
Attendance: 27,000
Referee: Marius Jonker (South Africa)

15 November 2008
14:30 BT/GMT+0 (UTC+0)

England	14–28	Australia
Try: Easter 36' m Pen: Cipriani (2) 40', 52'; Drop: Armitage 22'	(Report)	Try: Ashley-Cooper 69' c Con: Giteau; Pen: Giteau (6) 3', 6', 28', 32', 54', 58'; Mortlock 64'

Twickenham Stadium, London
Attendance: 80,688
Referee: Steve Walsh (New Zealand)

15 November 2008
14:30 BT/GMT+0 (UTC+0)

Scotland	10–14	South Africa
Try: Hines 39' c Con: Godman; Pen: Godman 28'	(Report)	Try: Fourie 57' m Pen: Pienaar (3) 46', 55', 66'

Murrayfield Stadium, Edinburgh
Attendance: 36,037
Referee: Dave Pearson (England)

15 November 2008
17:15 IST/GMT+0 (UTC+0)

Ireland	3–22	New Zealand
Pen: O'Gara 38'	(Report)	Try: Penalty try 40+2' c Nonu 47' c Thorn 53' m Con: Carter (2); Pen: Carter 26'

Croke Park, Dublin
Attendance: 77,500
Referee: Mark Lawrence (South Africa)

16 November 2008
15:00 JST (UTC+09)

Japan	29–19	United States
Try: Holani 33' c Endo 45' c Con: Nicholas (2); Pen: Nicholas (4) 3', 43', 53', 77'; Webb 59'		Try: MacDonald 9' c Ngwenya 39' c Welch 69' m Con: Hercus (2)

Mizuho Rugby Stadium, Nagoya
Attendance: 5,111
Referee: Peter Fitzgibbon (Ireland)

== Week 4 ==
Going into Week 4, the main storyline was the battle for fourth place in the IRB World Rankings. New Zealand, South Africa, and Australia were entrenched in the top three. The team that stood in fourth place on 1 December would avoid being drawn into the same pool as one of the Tri Nations powers in 2011. Four teams could have ended the week in fourth place: Argentina, England, France, and Wales.

22 November 2008
19:13 JST (UTC+09)

Japan	32–17	United States
Try: Hatakeyama 7' m Tomioka 28' c Webb 31' c Kikutani 63' c Con: Nicholas (3); Pen: Nicholas (2) 48', 68'		Try: Wyles 1' m Ngwenya 40+1' m Van der Giessen 50' c Con: Hercus

Chichibunomiya Rugby Stadium, Tokyo
Attendance: 11,836
Referee: Peter Fitzgibbon (Ireland)

22 November 2008
15:00 CET/GMT+01 (UTC+01)

Italy	17–25	Pacific Islanders
Try: Ghiraldini 16' c Ma. Bergamasco 65' c Con: Marcato (2); Pen: Marcato 6'		Try: Delasau 3' c, 29' m Ratuvou 40' c Con: Bai (2); Pen: Bai 18', 42'

Stadio Giglio, Reggio Emilia
Attendance: 13,595
Referee: Wayne Barnes (England)

- The Pacific Islanders defeated a Test team for the first time in nine attempts.

22 November 2008
14:30 BT/GMT+0 (UTC+0)

England	6–42	South Africa
Pen: Cipriani (2) 2', 29'	(Report)	Try: Rossouw 15' c Pienaar 19' c Jacobs 51' c Fourie 77' c Habana 80' m Con: Pienaar (3); F. Steyn; Pen: Pienaar (3) 6', 25', 63'

Twickenham Stadium, London
Attendance: 81,113
Referee: Nigel Owens (Wales)

22 November 2008
14:45 IST/GMT+0 (UTC+0)

Ireland	17–3	Argentina
Try: Bowe 77' m Pen: O'Gara (3) 39', 50' 75'; Drop: O'Gara 69'	(Report)	Pen: Fernández 36'

Croke Park, Dublin
Attendance: 68,352
Referee: Bryce Lawrence (New Zealand)

The missed conversion by Ronan O'Gara on Ireland's only try of the match proved decisive for Argentina. With the other results on the day, the Pumas would have dropped to fifth place, behind England, if O'Gara had converted, as it would have given Ireland a win by more than 15 points. As it turned out, Argentina retained fourth by a narrow margin.

22 November 2008
14:45 BT/GMT+0 (UTC+0)

Scotland	41–0	Canada
Try: Walker 2' m, 70' c Cairns 37' c Barclay 42' c Strokosch 56' c Lamont 73' m Con: Godman (3); Parks; Pen: Godman 34'	(Report)

Pittodrie Stadium, Aberdeen
Attendance: 17,651
Referee: George Clancy (Ireland)

22 November 2008
17:15 BT/GMT+0 (UTC+0)

Wales	9–29	New Zealand
Pen: S. Jones (3) 2', 14', 23'	(Report)	Try: Nonu 55' c Kaino 80+1' c Con: Carter (2); Pen: Carter (5) 17', 40', 42', 64', 74'

Millennium Stadium, Cardiff
Attendance: 74,076
Referee: Jonathan Kaplan (South Africa)

22 November 2008
21:00 WET/GMT+01 (UTC+01)

France	13–18	Australia
Try: Penalty try 39' c Con: Skrela; Pen: Skrela 48'; Drop: Medard 51'	(Report)	Try: Moore 31' c Hynes 57' m Con: Giteau; Pen: Giteau (2) 28', 74'

Stade de France, Saint-Denis
Attendance: 79,231
Referee: Craig Joubert (South Africa)

== Week 5 ==
The battle for fourth place in the IRB World Rankings finished this weekend, with Argentina remaining in fourth place without playing as England lost and Wales failed to achieve the 15-point winning margin required. Argentina therefore took top seeding for the following month's 2011 Rugby World Cup draw along with the three Tri-Nations teams.

The other major news of the week was New Zealand's win over England, completing a successful Grand Slam tour for the All Blacks. This was the All Blacks' third such successful tour, with the previous ones being in 1978 and 2005.

29 November 2008
14:30 BT/GMT+0 (UTC+0)

England	6–32	New Zealand
Pen: Flood 17'; Armitage 49'	(Report)	Try: Muliaina 58' m, 66' m Nonu 72' c Con: Carter; Pen: Carter (5) 15', 27', 36', 39', 62'

Twickenham Stadium, London
Attendance: 81,180
Referee: Alain Rolland (Ireland)

29 November 2008
14:30 BT/GMT+0 (UTC+0)

Wales	21–18	Australia
Try: Sh. Williams 4' m Byrne 32' c Con: S. Jones; Pen: S. Jones (2) 28', 78'; Drop: S. Jones 68'	(Report)	Try: Chisholm 14' c Ioane 79' m Con: Giteau; Pen: Giteau 46'; Drop: Giteau 25'

Millennium Stadium, Cardiff
Attendance: 74,314
Referee: Alan Lewis (Ireland)

3 December 2008
19:45 BT/GMT+0 (UTC+0)

Barbarians	11–18	Australia
Try: Collins c Pen: Montgomery (2)	(Report)	Try: Tuqiri m Turner c Con: O' Connor; Pen: O'Connor (2)

Wembley Stadium, London
Attendance: 43,600
Referee: Chris White (England)

== Effect on World Cup seeding ==
Following the 29 November tests, the 12 teams that qualified automatically for the 2011 Rugby World Cup were seeded thus:

Pot 1

- New Zealand
- South Africa
- Australia
- Argentina

Pot 2

- England
- Wales
- France
- Ireland

Pot 3

- Scotland
- Fiji
- Italy
- Tonga
