= Huia Edmonds =

Australian rugby union footballer

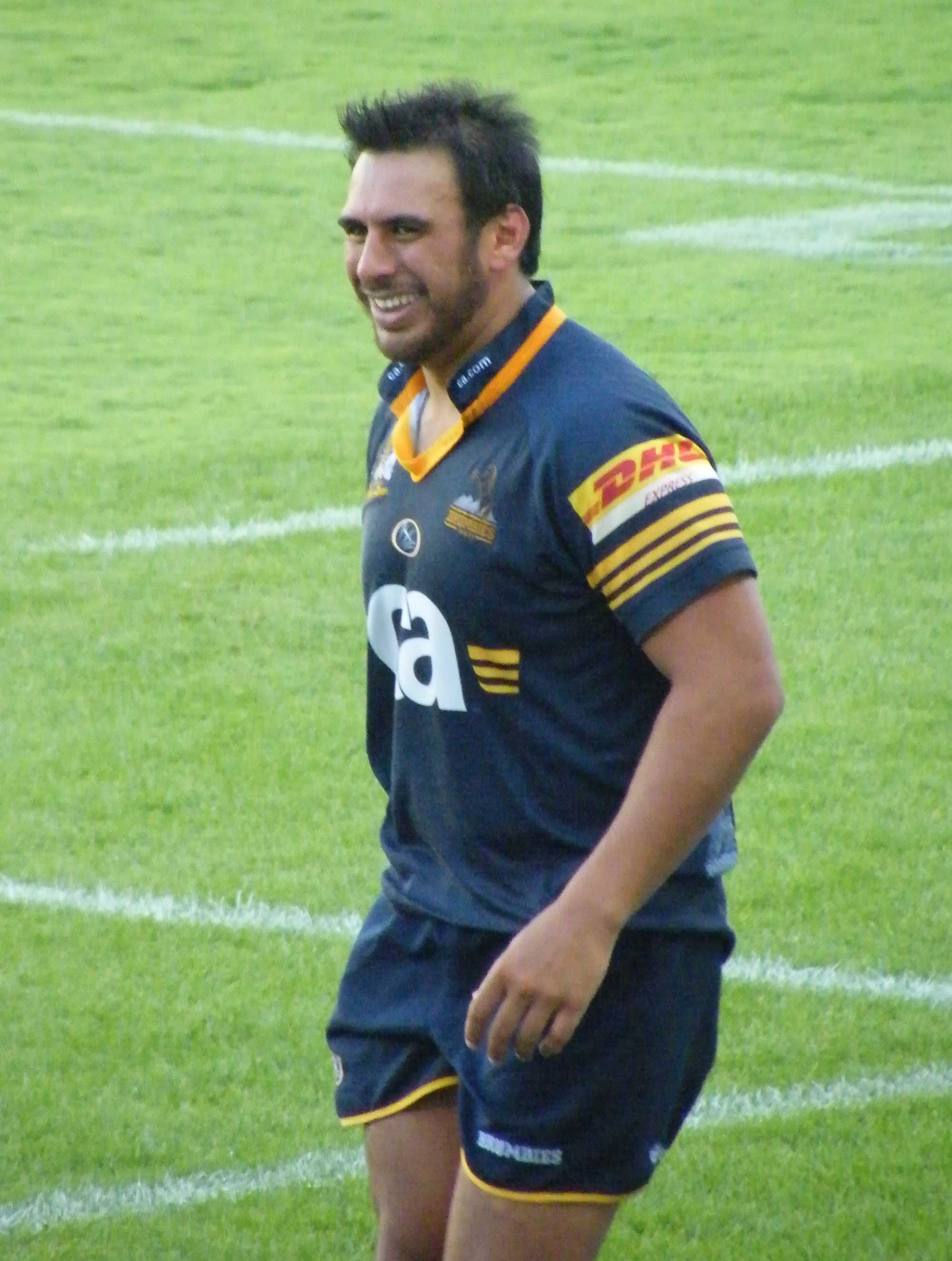
- Born: Huia Edmonds; 20 October 1981 (age 45) Ashburton, New Zealand
- Height: 183 cm (6 ft 0 in)
- Weight: 103 kg (16 st 3 lb)
- School: Erindale College, ACT

Rugby union career
- Position: Hooker
Amateur team(s)
Years	Team	Apps	(Points)
- Tuggeranong Vikings
Senior career
Years	Team	Apps	(Points)
2007	Canberra Vikings		
2012–2014	Gloucester Rugby	42	(15)
2014–2017	RC Narbonne	61	(60)
Super Rugby
Years	Team	Apps	(Points)
2002–2005	Waratahs	7	(0)
2006–2007	Stormers	3	(0)
2008–2011	Brumbies	15	(5)
International career
Years	Team	Apps	(Points)
2010	Australia	4	(0)

Huia Edmonds (born 20 October 1981) is an Australian retired professional rugby union footballer. He played for the Waratahs, Stormers and the Brumbies in Super Rugby before earning four caps for Australia playing at hooker. He later played for Gloucester in England and RC Narbonne in France.

== Early life ==
Edmonds was born in Ashburton, New Zealand and educated at Erindale College in Canberra. He played for the Australian Schoolboys team in 1998 and the Australian under-19 and under-21 teams in 2000 and 2002 respectively.

== Rugby career ==
In 2002 he was recruited by the NSW Waratahs and made his Super 12 debut against the Bulls. Edmonds spent several seasons in South Africa, playing for Western Province in the Currie Cup and the Stormers in Super 14, before returning to Canberra to join the ACT Brumbies for the 2007 season.

In 2010, Edmonds made his test debut against Fiji. He then went on to score his maiden test try against Wales in the Spring Tour.

He was scheduled to sign for Saracens for the 2011 season, however due to injury to his shoulder followed by a broken foot this deal fell through. Edmonds signed for English side Gloucester Rugby on a two-year contract in 2012. He then moved to France in late 2014 to join Pro D2 team RC Narbonne, where he played for three seasons.

Edmonds joined Eastern Suburbs Rugby Union Club in Canberra as the assistant coach.
