= Hugo Southwell =

Scotland international rugby union player

- Born: Hugo Finlay Grant Southwell; 14 May 1980 (age 46) London, England
- Height: 1.88 m (6 ft 2 in)
- Weight: 96 kg (15 st 2 lb)
- School: Cottesmore Prep School/Eastbourne College
- University: University of the West of England

Rugby union career
- Position(s): Centre, Wing, Full-back
Senior career
Years	Team	Apps	(Points)
2000–2002	Bristol Rugby		
2002–2003	Worcester Warriors		
2003–2009	Edinburgh Rugby		
2009–2011	Stade Français	42	(35)
2011–2014	Wasps	53	(40)
International career
Years	Team	Apps	(Points)
2004–2011	Scotland	59	(40)
- Correct as of 26 October 2011

Hugo Finlay Grant Southwell (born 14 May 1980 in London) is a retired Scottish rugby union footballer. He played as a fullback, centre and wing.

== Career ==
He played for London Wasps as well as Stade Français, Edinburgh, Worcester Warriors and Bristol Rugby during his career. He qualified for Scotland through a maternal grandfather from Falkirk. Southwell made his Scotland debut as a replacement in 2004 against Samoa in New Zealand. He made a try-scoring debut at Murrayfield as he crossed the line against Australia in the opening match of the 2004 Autumn tests which was the first of his eight international tries. Southwell was restored to the Scotland line-up for the 2005 Autumn test against New Zealand and rewarded Frank Hadden with a fine display against the All Blacks.

Southwell won the last of his 59 caps against Wales at Murrayfield in 2011. He missed that year's World Cup with a knee problem before retiring from international rugby to concentrate on club rugby.

Following being and ever-present for Wasps in his debut season, Southwell was named club captain for the 2012–13 campaign. In February 2014 he was forced to announce his retirement from playing due to injury.

== Other Info ==
He was educated at Cottesmore School in Sussex. Southwell is also a keen cricketer. He was coached at Eastbourne College by the former West Indian test cricketer John Shepherd. He played three One Day matches for the Sussex Cricket Board as a batting all-rounder before deciding to concentrate on rugby. He still maintains the ambition to play first-class cricket, once his rugby career is over, in the hope that he will be able to fulfil his dream of becoming a double international. Southwell's ambition received the support of the former England cricket coach Peter Moores, who previously coached him at Sussex. This support was to the dismay of Frank Hadden who had previously voiced his concern over Southwell's cricketing ambitions ahead of the rugby internationals against Barbarians and the two-match Test tour of South Africa in 2006. Hadden had wanted the Scottish Rugby Squad to rest ahead of the showpiece games and was concerned that Southwell, who took three wickets for Heriot's and hit the winning runs against Edinburgh Accies, decided to play in the Masterton Trophy instead.

== See also ==
- List of Scottish cricket and rugby union players
