= Frank Hadden =

Scottish rugby union player & coach

- Born: Frank Hadden; 14 July 1954 (age 72) Dundee, Scotland
- School: High School of Dundee
- University: Strathclyde University; Carnegie School of Physical Education

Rugby union career
- Position(s): Fly-half, Coach
- Current team: No current team
Amateur team(s)
Years	Team	Apps	(Points)
- Edinburgh Northern
Senior career
Years	Team	Apps	(Points)
- Headingley
Coaching career
- Years: Team
- 2005–2009: Scotland
- 2000–2005: Edinburgh
- 1997–1998: Caledonia Reds
- 1983–2000: Merchiston Castle School
- 1994–2000: Scotland U18
- 1994–2000: Scotland U19
- 1994–2000: Scotland U16
- 1989: The Southport School
- –: Dundee HSFP
- Correct as of 11 November 2006

Frank Hadden (born 14 June 1954) is a Scottish rugby union coach. He is a former head coach of Scotland and Edinburgh Rugby.

Hadden replaced Matt Williams and was appointed on 15 September 2005. Hadden coached the Merchiston Castle School 1st XV after being appointed Head of Physical Education at the school in 1983. He coached several Scottish age-group teams before being appointed assistant coach of the Caledonian Reds in 1997. He was later appointed coach of Edinburgh Gunners (now Edinburgh Rugby) in 2000 prior to becoming the Scotland coach. He has since coached Scotland to notable wins over England and France in the 2006 Six Nations and again winning the Calcutta Cup against England in the 2008 Six Nations. He parted company with the national side on 2 April 2009 after a second consecutive disappointing Six Nations where they finished second bottom after winning just one match.

== Background ==
Born in Dundee, Hadden was educated at the High School of Dundee and the University of Strathclyde, playing rugby for both. He attended the Carnegie School of Physical Education in Leeds (now Leeds Metropolitan University) to pursue a teaching career.

== Playing career ==
While teaching at Guiseley School, he played rugby union for Headingley. He occasionally played in their 1st XV when the incumbent fly half, Ian McGeechan (who later became coach of Scotland and the British and Irish Lions) was away on international playing duty. Hadden also spent his youth playing for Dundee HSFP, with his last match in 1987 on a tour of Ireland. Ironically Hadden came close to playing football, with trials with both Queens Park Rangers and Forfar Athletic, as well as being offered a contract by Raith Rovers.

== Coaching career ==
=== Merchiston Castle School and Scotland under-16s ===
In 1983, Hadden was appointed Head of physical education and director of rugby at Merchiston Castle School (MCS) in Edinburgh. Hadden helped turn the school's 1st XV into a dominant force in Scottish schools rugby. During one four-year period at the school he coached their team to 54 victories from 58 matches. In 1994 he was appointed coach of Scotland under-16s team. He continued to coach national age group sides until 2000.

Hadden's first appointment to a professional team was in 1997 as assistant coach for the Caledonia Reds, one of the four new professional teams launched in Scotland. Hadden was included in the 1998 Scotland tour of Australia in the capacity of technical coach. However, when the Scottish Rugby Union was forced to merge the Caledonian Reds with the Glasgow Warriors during budget cut-backs, Hadden returned to teaching at Merchiston. While coaching the 1st XV he took them on to win The Scottish Schools Cup on a number of occasions. Along with rugby he was also an athletics coach at the school.

=== Edinburgh and Scotland ===
In 2000 a player revolt led to the removal of Ian Rankin as coach of Edinburgh Rugby. The Scottish Rugby Union's Director of Rugby Jim Telfer asked Hadden to accept the role of head coach. In 2004, he became the first coach to take a Scottish professional team to the Heineken Cup quarter-finals.

In April 2005 Matt Williams was sacked as Scotland coach after losing all but three of his 17 matches in charge. That month Hadden was appointed Scotland interim coach, leading Scotland to victories against the Barbarians and Romania. On 15 September 2005 Hadden was confirmed as Scotland coach until the Rugby World Cup in 2007.

Hadden's first Six Nations game was a historic victory over France at Murrayfield on 5 February 2006 by 20 points to 16. This was the first time since 1999 that Scotland had beaten France. He succeeded in generating confidence in the team that was lacking under his predecessor. Chris Paterson said of Hadden's influence: "There is a confidence among the guys now and increased skill and belief in our handling... That's a testament to Frank and his coaching team."

The Calcutta Cup returned to the SRU trophy cabinet on 25 February 2006 for the first time since 2000 after Hadden coached Scotland to victory over England. The win was largely due to a defensive effort that saw 112 tackles made by Scotland, with only 6 missed.

Scotland finished third in the 2006 Six Nations, their best result since 2001. Their three wins in the 2006 Six Nations contrasting their sole win from the 2004 and 2005 tournaments. The turnaround was largely credited to Hadden, as the players available were nearly identical. Their win over France in the six-nations put Scotland eighth in the IRB world rankings. Under Hadden Scotland reached as high as seventh in the world rankings.

Hadden continued to coach Scotland through 2007, and coached them to the quarter-finals of the 2007 World Cup where they were defeated by Argentina. On 18 December 2007 the SRU announced that Hadden had signed a rolling contract to continue as Scotland coach until November 2008.

Hadden won the Calcutta Cup for a second time on 8 March 2008, after a 15–9 victory over England at Murrayfield. Poor performances subsequently led to commentators and former players to call for Hadden's removal. He parted company with the national side on 2 April 2009 after a second consecutive disappointing Six Nations, and was replaced by Andy Robinson.

=== Scotland (2005-2009) ===
==== International matches as head coach ====
Matches (2005–2009)
Matches	Date	Opposition	Venue	Score (Sco.–Opponent)	Competition	Captain
2005
1	5 June	Romania	Stadionul Dinamo, Bucharest	39–19	Summer Tour	Jon Petrie
2	12 November	Argentina	Murrayfield Stadium, Edinburgh	19–23	Autumn Internationals	Jason White
3	19 November	Samoa	Murrayfield Stadium, Edinburgh	18–11	Autumn Internationals	Jason White
4	26 November	New Zealand	Murrayfield Stadium, Edinburgh	10–29	Autumn Internationals	Jason White
2006
5	5 February	France	Murrayfield Stadium, Edinburgh	20–16	Six Nations	Jason White
6	12 February	Wales	Millennium Stadium, Cardiff	18–28	Six Nations	Jason White
7	25 February	England	Murrayfield Stadium, Edinburgh	18–12	Six Nations	Jason White
8	11 March	Ireland	Lansdowne Road, Dublin	9–15	Six Nations	Jason White
9	18 March	Italy	Stadio Flaminio, Rome	13–10	Six Nations	Jason White
10	10 June	South Africa	ABSA Stadium, Durban	16–36	Summer Tour (Scotland tour)	Jason White
11	17 June	South Africa	EPRU Stadium, Port Elizabeth	15–29	Summer Tour (Scotland tour)	Jason White
12	11 November	Romania	Murrayfield Stadium, Edinburgh	48–6	Autumn Internationals	Jason White
13	18 November	Pacific Islanders	Murrayfield Stadium, Edinburgh	34–22	Autumn Internationals	Chris Paterson
14	25 November	Australia	Murrayfield Stadium, Edinburgh	15–44	Autumn Internationals	Chris Paterson
2007
15	3 February	England	Twickenham Stadium, London	20–42	Six Nations	Chris Paterson
16	10 February	Wales	Murrayfield Stadium, Edinburgh	21–9	Six Nations	Chris Paterson
17	24 February	Italy	Murrayfield Stadium, Edinburgh	17–37	Six Nations	Chris Paterson
18	10 March	Ireland	Murrayfield Stadium, Edinburgh	18–19	Six Nations	Chris Paterson
19	17 March	France	Stade de France, Saint-Denis	19–46	Six Nations	Chris Paterson
20	11 August	Ireland	Murrayfield Stadium, Edinburgh	31–21	2007 RWC warm-ups	Jason White
21	25 August	South Africa	Murrayfield Stadium, Edinburgh	3–27	2007 RWC warm-ups	Jason White
22	9 September	Portugal	Stade Geoffroy-Guichard, Saint-Étienne	56–10	2007 Rugby World Cup	Jason White
23	18 September	Romania	Murrayfield Stadium, Edinburgh	42–0	2007 Rugby World Cup	Jason White
24	23 September	New Zealand	Murrayfield Stadium, Edinburgh	0–40	2007 Rugby World Cup	Scott Murray
25	29 September	Italy	Stade Geoffroy-Guichard, Saint-Étienne	18–16	2007 Rugby World Cup	Jason White
26	7 October	Argentina	Stade de France, Saint-Denis	13–19	2007 Rugby World Cup	Jason White
2008
27	3 February	France	Murrayfield Stadium, Edinburgh	6–27	Six Nations	Jason White
28	9 February	Wales	Millennium Stadium, Cardiff	15–30	Six Nations	Jason White
29	23 February	Ireland	Croke Park, Dublin	13–34	Six Nations	Mike Blair
30	8 March	England	Murrayfield Stadium, Edinburgh	15–9	Six Nations	Mike Blair
31	15 March	Italy	Stadio Flaminio, Rome	20–23	Six Nations	Mike Blair
32	7 June	Argentina	Estadio Gigante de Arroyito, Rosario	15–21	Summer Tour (Scotland tour)	Mike Blair
33	14 June	Argentina	Vélez Sársfield, Buenos Aires	14–26	Summer Tour (Scotland tour)	Mike Blair
34	8 November	New Zealand	Murrayfield Stadium, Edinburgh	6–32	Autumn Internationals	Mike Blair
35	15 November	South Africa	Murrayfield Stadium, Edinburgh	10–14	Autumn Internationals	Mike Blair
36	22 November	Canada	Pittodrie Stadium, Aberdeen	41–0	Autumn Internationals	Mike Blair
2009
37	8 February	Wales	Murrayfield Stadium, Edinburgh	13–26	Six Nations	Mike Blair
38	14 February	France	Stade de France, Saint-Denis	13–22	Six Nations	Mike Blair
39	28 February	Italy	Murrayfield Stadium, Edinburgh	26–6	Six Nations	Mike Blair
40	14 March	Ireland	Murrayfield Stadium, Edinburgh	15–22	Six Nations	Mike Blair
41	21 March	England	Twickenham Stadium, London	12–26	Six Nations	Mike Blair

==== Record by country ====
Opponent	Played	Won	Drew	Lost	Win ratio (%)	For	Against
Argentina	4	1	0	3	25	73	77
Australia	1	0	0	1	0	15	44
Canada	1	1	0	0	100	41	0
England	4	2	0	2	50	65	89
France	4	1	0	3	25	58	111
Ireland	5	1	0	4	20	86	111
Italy	5	3	0	2	60	94	92
New Zealand	3	0	0	3	0	16	101
Romania	3	3	0	0	100	129	25
Pacific Islanders	1	1	0	0	100	34	22
Portugal	1	1	0	0	100	56	10
Samoa	1	1	0	0	100	18	11
South Africa	4	0	0	4	0	44	106
Wales	4	1	0	3	25	67	93
TOTAL	41	16	0	25	39	796	892

== See also ==
- Scotland national rugby union team
- Six Nations Championship
- Sean Lineen
- Edinburgh Rugby

Preceded by (Australia) Matt Williams	Scotland national rugby union team coach 2005–2009	Succeeded by (England) Andy Robinson
