= Mauro Comuzzi =

Argentine rugby union player (born 1983)

- Full name: Mauro Adrian Comuzzi
- Born: 12 July 1983 (age 43) Buenos Aires, Argentina
- Height: 6 ft 0 in (183 cm)
- Weight: 202 lb (92 kg)

Rugby union career
- Position: Wing
International career
Years	Team	Apps	(Points)
2008–11	Argentina	5	(0)

Mauro Adrian Comuzzi (born 12 July 1983) is an Argentine former rugby union international.

Comuzzi, a native of Buenos Aires Province, was a winger and occasional fullback. He played in Italy from 2005 to 2008, for Amatori Catania and U.R. Capitolina, before breaking into the national team (Pumas).

Between 2008 and 2011, Comuzzi was capped five times for the Pumas, mostly on the wing. His international career included a Test match against England at Twickenham. He played in the Pampas XV that won the 2011 Vodacom Cup, competing amongst South African provincial teams.

Comuzzi retired from professional rugby aged 30 and relocated to Chile in 2015 to take up a position at The Grange School, Santiago, where he is the Head of Sports.

== See also ==
- List of Argentina national rugby union players
