= Dewald Potgieter =

South African rugby union player

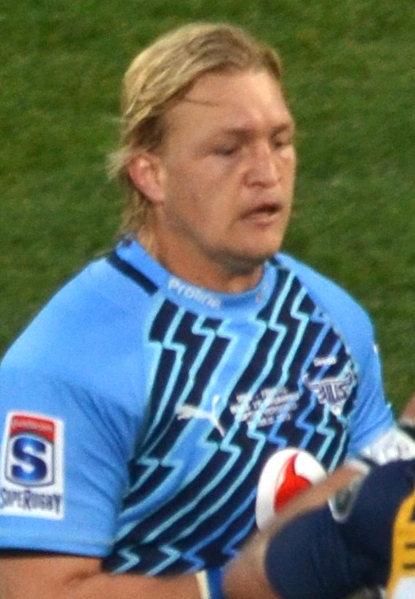
- Born: 22 February 1987 (age 39) Port Elizabeth, South Africa
- Height: 1.90 m (6 ft 3 in)
- Weight: 102 kg (16 st 1 lb)
- School: HTS Daniel Pienaar, Uitenhage, South Africa
- Occupation: Professional rugby union footballer

Rugby union career
- Position: Loose forward
Senior career
Years	Team	Apps	(Points)
2013–2016	Yamaha Júbilo	12	(5)
2016–present	Worcester Warriors		
Provincial / State sides
Years	Team	Apps	(Points)
2007–2013	Blue Bulls	65	(50)
- Correct as of 21 October 2012
Super Rugby
Years	Team	Apps	(Points)
2008–2014	Bulls	70	(20)
- Correct as of 5 June 2014
International career
Years	Team	Apps	(Points)
2009–2010	South Africa	6	(5)

Dewald Potgieter (born 22 February 1987 in Port Elizabeth, South Africa) is a professional South African rugby union rugby player. His first tour with the Springboks was to France, Italy, Ireland & England in late 2009. Potgieter plays loose forward for Worcester Warriors, having previously played for Super Rugby franchise the Bulls and Japanese Top League side Yamaha Jubilo. Potgieter has won 2 Super Rugby titles and a Currie Cup.

Potgieter has retired from rugby after a knee injury.

== Honours ==
- Cravenweek – 1999–2005
- Eastern Province Grant Khomo week 2003
- Eastern Province U18 Craven week captain 2004
- Eastern Province U18 Craven Week Captain 2005
- Green Squad 2004
- SA Schools 2005
- Blue Bulls U19 2006
- Blue Bulls U21 2007
- Vodacom Blue Bulls 2006–2009
- SA U21 2006
- Vodacom Blue Bulls U21 Absa Competition – 2007
- Emerging Springboks – 2007–2009
- Springboks – 2009 to current
