= Phil Godman =

Scotland international rugby union player (born 1982)

- Born: Philip James Godman; 20 May 1982 (age 44) Edinburgh, Scotland
- Height: 1.78 m (5 ft 10 in)
- Weight: 89 kg (196 lb; 14 st 0 lb)
- School: Merchiston Castle School

Rugby union career
- Position(s): Fly-half, Centre
- Current team: N/A
Senior career
| Years | Team | Apps | (Points) |
| 2002–2004 | Newcastle Falcons | 25 | (5) |
| 2004–2012 | Edinburgh Rugby | 150 | (435) |
| 2012–2013 | London Scottish | 19 | (21) |
| 2013–2015 | Newcastle Falcons | 23 | (82) |
International career
| Years | Team | Apps | (Points) |
| 2005–2010 | Scotland | 23 | (71) |

Phil Godman (born 20 May 1982) is an ex rugby union player, who played for Edinburgh Rugby and Newcastle Falcons as well as representing Scottish rugby union side.

== Early life ==
He was educated at Merchiston Castle School, where he played for the rugby union side in three consecutive Scottish Schools Cup finals, winning the cup in 1999 and 2000, when he captained the side.

== Club career ==
After leaving Merchiston Castle School, he signed a professional contract with English Premiership team Newcastle Falcons in the summer of 2002. However, after two years as understudy to Jonny Wilkinson at the Newcastle Falcons, he moved to Pro 12 (then Celtic League) team Edinburgh (then Edinburgh Gunners) in the summer of 2004. Godman established himself as first choice fly-half at Edinburgh Rugby and remained so until tearing his anterior cruciate ligament in training with Edinburgh in September 2010. After missing the remainder of 2010 and the majority of 2011, as a result of the injury, Godman found opportunities restricted as new coach Michael Bradley looked to make wholesale changes to the Edinburgh Rugby squad. In May 2012, he left Edinburgh Rugby for RFU Championship team London Scottish F.C. In April 2013, Godman agreed to rejoin Newcastle Falcons for the 2013/14 season. However he was released from Newcastle Falcons prior to the 2015/16 season and is now coaching at the High School of Dundee.

== International career ==
He represented the Scottish rugby union side at schoolboy, under 18, under 19 and under 21 levels before being selected for his first cap by Frank Hadden against Romania in June 2005. In 2009, Godman was named man of the match as Scotland recorded their first win over Australia for 27 years. He remained a mainstay in the Scottish squad under coach Andy Robinson until tearing his anterior cruciate ligament in training with his club Edinburgh in September 2010. After recovering from the injury, Godman returned to the Scottish squad in January 2012. However, he never played for Scotland again.
