= Patricio Albacete =

Argentine rugby union player (born 1981)

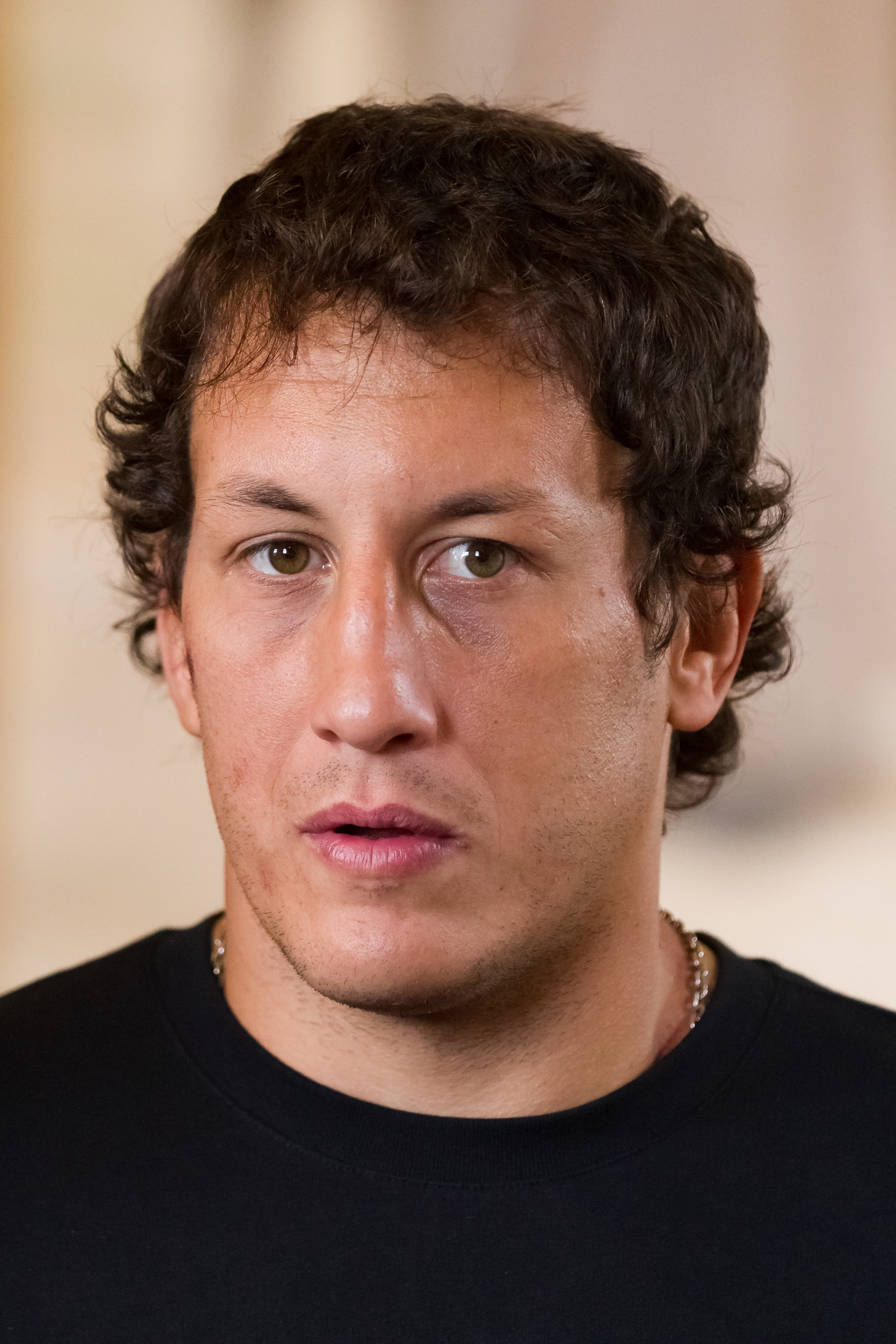
- Born: Patricio Albacete; 9 February 1981 (age 45) Buenos Aires, Argentina
- Height: 2.00 m (6 ft 7 in)
- Weight: 122 kg (19 st 3 lb)

Rugby union career
- Position: Lock
Senior career
Years	Team	Apps	(Points)
-2003	Manuel Belgrano		
2003–04	Colomiers	11	(5)
2004–06	Pau	26	(5)
2006–2017	Toulouse	234	(43)
2017–2018	Racing 92	3	(0)
- Correct as of 31 May 2018
International career
Years	Team	Apps	(Points)
1998	Argentina U18		
1999–2000	Argentina U19	6	(0)
2000–02	Argentina U21	12	(30)
2002–03	Argentina A	5	(5)
2003–2014	Argentina	57	(5)
- Correct as of 02 April 2026

Patricio Albacete (born 9 December 1981 in Buenos Aires) is a retired Argentine rugby union player.

Albacete formerly played for Stade Toulousain and Racing 92 in the top level of French rugby, the Top 14 competition. He has also represented the national Argentina team, including being a part of their 2003 Rugby World Cup squad.

His usual position is at lock. He won the Top 14 in 2008 and the 2009–10 Heineken Cup. In January, Patricio Albacete announced on his official website that he signed a new 4 years deal with Stade Toulousain.
