= Agustín Figuerola =

Argentine rugby union player (born 1985)

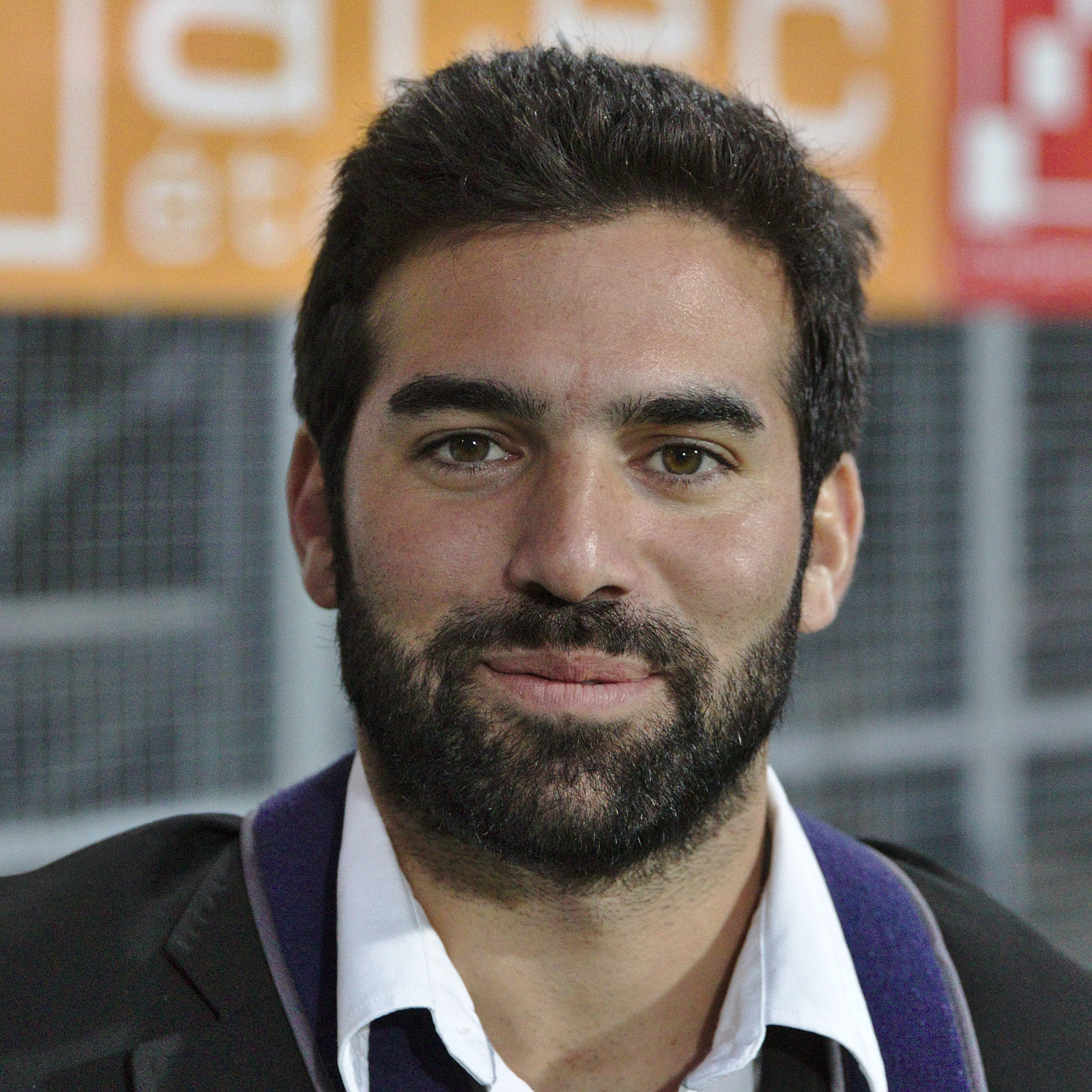
- Born: Agustín Figuerola; January 27, 1985 (age 41) Buenos Aires, Argentina
- Height: 1.70 m (5 ft 7 in)
- Weight: 76 kg (12 st 0 lb; 168 lb)

Rugby union career
- Position(s): Scrum-half, Fly-half
- Current team: CASI
Senior career
Years	Team	Apps	(Points)
2009–10	Pampas XV	7	(0)
2010	CASI	6	(73)
2010–13	Brive	36	(12)
2013–15	Oyonnax	23	(10)
2015-17	Lyon OU	27	(10)
2016-17	CASI	03	(0)
- Correct as of 14 December 2019
International career
Years	Team	Apps	(Points)
2009-	Jaguars	1	
2008–	Argentina	7	(0)
- Correct as of 21 June 2013
National sevens team
Years	Team		Comps
2009–	Argentina		3

Agustín Figuerola (born January 27, 1985) is an Argentine rugby union footballer for Brive in the Top 14. He has played at both scrum-half and fly-half. He has also played for Argentina.
