= Scott MacLeod (rugby union) =

Scotland international rugby union player

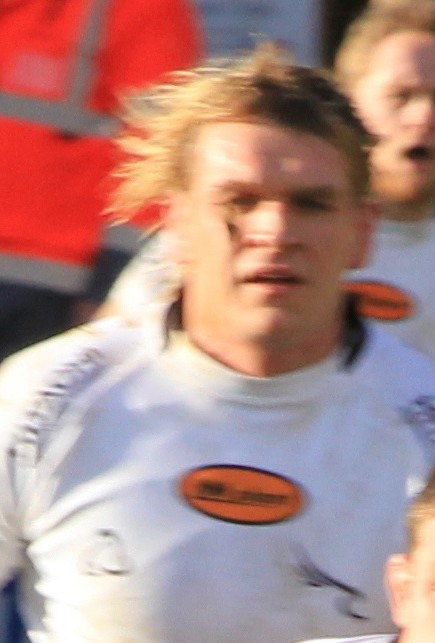
- Born: Scott MacLeod; 3 March 1979 (age 47) Hawick, Scotland
- Height: 1.98 m (6 ft 6 in)
- Weight: 110 kg (17 st 5 lb)
- School: Hawick High School

Rugby union career
- Position: Lock
Amateur team(s)
Years	Team	Apps	(Points)
- Hawick Trades
–2002	Hawick		
Senior career
Years	Team	Apps	(Points)
2002–2006	Border Reivers	60	(20)
2006–2009	Scarlets	59	(25)
2009–2011	Edinburgh	45	(0)
2011–2012	Kobelco Steelers	6	(0)
2012–2016	Newcastle Falcons	61	(10)
International career
Years	Team	Apps	(Points)
2004–2011	Scotland	24	(0)

Scott MacLeod (born 3 March 1979 in Hawick) is a retired Scottish rugby union footballer. He last played as a lock for Newcastle Falcons. He is currently still an active part of that club, in a coaching role. Having retired from playing at the end of the 2016–16 season.

MacLeod was introduced to rugby at the age of 21, having previously been a keen golfer and basketball player. He joined Hawick Trades before going on to play for Hawick RFC, with whom he won the BT Cellnet Cup in 2002 and from whom he joined The Borders professional team when it was set up that year. MacLeod represented the Borders at under-21 level, but left the Border Reivers to join Llanelli Scarlets for the 2006–07 season and made his debut for the West Wales team on a visit to Ulster on the opening weekend of the Magners League. He returned to Scottish rugby in January 2008 by signing for Edinburgh.

MacLeod made his debut for the national side on 6 November 2004, in a match against Australia, and has received 24 caps in total, 15 as a substitute. MacLeod was in the Scotland squad for the 2007 Rugby World Cup, where he made five appearances (four as a substitute).

On the morning of 25 February 2008, MacLeod was announced to have tested positive for banned substance terbutaline, only to be retrospectively cleared a few hours later after it was revealed to be nothing more than an administrative error. It was also announced later in the year that he had failed a doping test due to unusually high testosterone levels. He was later cleared as the rise in testosterone was due to a large amount of alcohol being consumed by the player the night before the test to celebrate the birth of his first child.

MacLeod was released by the Scarlets by mutual consent on 29 January 2009. He then signed for Edinburgh later that day.

In November 2010, MacLeod confirmed that he was moving to Japan. He has signed for the Kobe Kobelco Steelers for their upcoming 2011–12 Top League campaign.

In the 2012–13 season, Macleod signed up to play for the Newcastle Falcons.
