= Rafael Carballo =

Argentine rugby union footballer

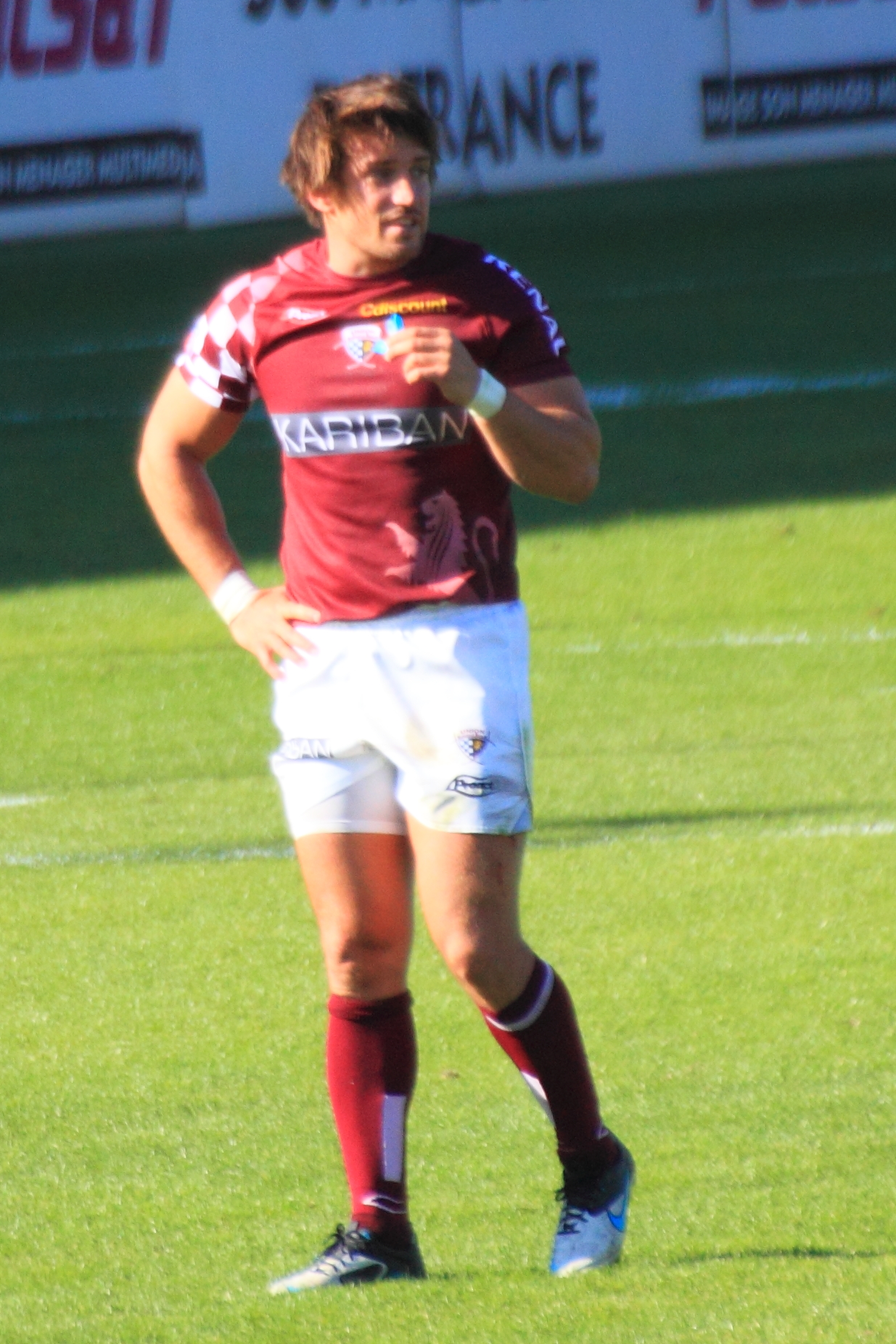
- Born: Rafael Carballo; October 16, 1981 (age 45) Buenos Aires, Argentina
- Height: 1.80 m (5 ft 11 in)
- Weight: 95 kg (14 st 13 lb)

Rugby union career
- Position(s): Wing, Centre
Amateur team(s)
Years	Team	Apps	(Points)
- San Carlos
–2004	Alumni		
2009–10	Alumni		
Senior career
Years	Team	Apps	(Points)
2004–06	Toulon	10	(15)
2006–09	Castres	52	(35)
2010–	Bordeaux	68	(40)
- Correct as of 21 June 2013
International career
Years	Team	Apps	(Points)
- Argentina U-21
- Argentina Jaguars
- Argentina
- Correct as of 10 September 2012

Rafael Carballo (born 16 October 1981) is an Argentine rugby union footballer who plays at wing or centre for Bordeaux in the Top 14. He has also represented the Argentina national rugby union team.
