= Gonzalo Tiesi =

Argentine rugby union player (born 1985)

- Born: Gonzalo Pedro Tiesi; 24 April 1985 (age 41) Buenos Aires, Argentina
- Height: 6 ft 0 in (1.83 m)
- Weight: 96 kg (15 st 2 lb)

Rugby union career
- Position: Centre
Senior career
| Years | Team | Apps | (Points) |
| 2003–2005 | S.I.C. | – | (–) |
| 2005–2008 | London Irish | 16 | (15) |
| 2008–2010 | Harlequins | 24 | (10) |
| 2010–2012 | Stade Français | 18 | (5) |
| 2012 | S.I.C. | 7 | (10) |
| 2013 | London Welsh | 6 | (0) |
| 2013–2016 | Newcastle Falcons | 19 | (0) |
- Correct as of 17 June 2013
International career
| Years | Team | Apps | (Points) |
| 2004–2014 | Argentina | 38 | (30) |
- Correct as of 17 November 2013
National sevens team
| Years | Team | | Comps |
| 2005 | Argentina | | 1 |
- Correct as of 23 September 2007

Gonzalo Tiesi (born 24 April 1985 in Buenos Aires) is a retired Argentine rugby union player. Tiesi played for the London Irish, Harlequins, Stade Français, London Welsh and Newcastle Falcons, as for 31 December 2012 won 32 full caps for his national team, Los Pumas. His usual position was at centre.

Tiesi formerly played for the San Isidro Club, in the north of Buenos Aires. Prior to signing with Harlequins he played for London Irish. He has also represented Argentina Sevens at the IRB Sevens event in Los Angeles. He also played for Buenos Aires Rugby Union in 2005 and previously represented Argentina at both under-21 and under-19 level.

He was part of the Argentine squad for the 2007 Rugby World Cup which succeed in gaining Argentina's highest world cup finish of third place and Argentine squad for the 2011 Rugby World Cup in New Zealand.

At the end of 2011–12 season he left France for getting back to San Isidro Club of Argentina; in January 2013 Tiesi was signed by the London Welsh. On 6 November 2013, he signed for Newcastle Falcons in the Aviva Premiership.
