= Esteban Lozada =

Argentine rugby union player

- Born: 8 January 1982 (age 44) Ottignies, Belgium
- Height: 1.94 m (6 ft 4 in)
- Weight: 110 kg (17 st 5 lb; 243 lb)

Rugby union career
- Position: Lock
Senior career
Years	Team	Apps	(Points)
2001–07	CASI		
2007–10	Toulon	54	(15)
2010–12	Edinburgh	34	(0)
2012–13	Agen	20	(5)
2013-14	London Wasps	2	(0)
- Correct as of 12 June 2013
International career
Years	Team	Apps	(Points)
2006–	Argentina	22	(0)
- Correct as of 24 June 2013

Esteban Lozada (born 8 January 1982 in Belgium) is a former Argentine rugby union player who last played for English team London Wasps in the Aviva Premiership. He also played for the Argentina national team and was part of the 2007 Rugby World Cup squad. He debuted with "Los Pumas" on 11 November 2006. Weighing 110 kg (242 lbs), he stands 1.94m tall (6 ft 4in) and his position is lock. In May 2014 Lozada announced his retirement from Rugby.
