= Álvaro Galindo =

Argentine rugby union player (born 1982)

- Born: Álvaro Galindo; 26 February 1982 (age 44) Tucumán, Argentina
- Height: 1.93 m (6 ft 4 in)
- Weight: 102 kg (16 st 1 lb)

Rugby union career
- Position: Back-row
Senior career
Years	Team	Apps	(Points)
2006–08	Beziers	49	(25)
2008–2013	Racing Métro	128	(35)
- Correct as of 21 June 2013
International career
Years	Team	Apps	(Points)
2004–	Argentina	13	(10)
- Correct as of 10 September 2012

Álvaro Galindo (born 26 February 1982), is an Argentine professional rugby union footballer. Álvaro currently plays for the French club Racing Métro 92. Standing at 6 ft 4in he plays in the back-row where he also represents his country.
