= Alasdair Strokosch =

Scotland international rugby union player

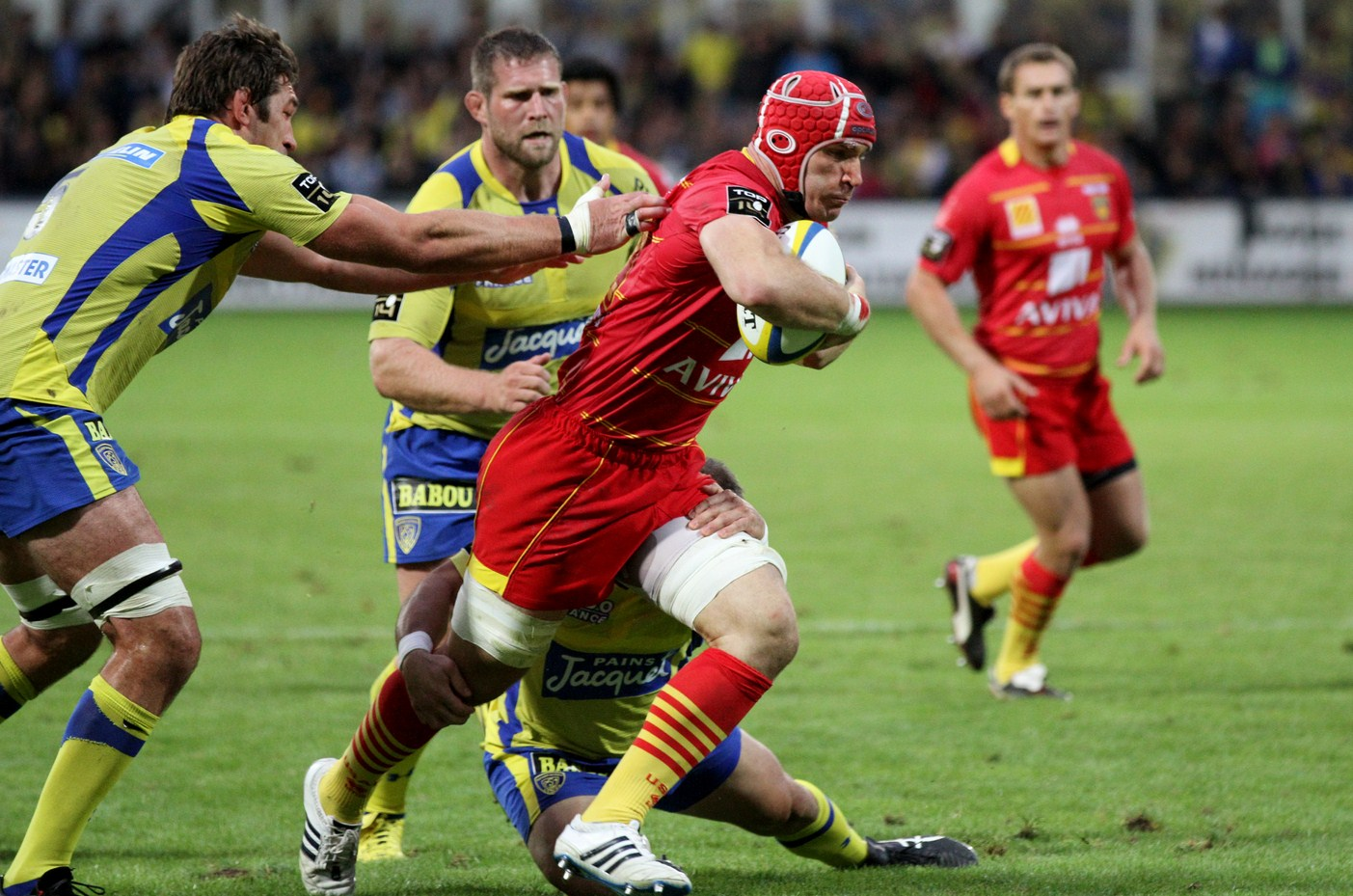
- Born: Alasdair Karl Strokosch; 21 February 1983 (age 43) Paisley, Renfrewshire, Scotland
- Height: 1.90 m (6 ft 3 in)
- Weight: 110 kg (243 lb)
- School: Claremont High School

Rugby union career
- Position: Flanker
Amateur team(s)
Years	Team	Apps	(Points)
2002–2004	Boroughmuir		
Senior career
Years	Team	Apps	(Points)
2004–2007	Edinburgh Rugby	50	(20)
2007–2012	Gloucester Rugby	112	(10)
2012–2018	USA Perpignan	117	(55)
- Correct as of 25 June 2018
International career
Years	Team	Apps	(Points)
2006–2015	Scotland	47	(10)
- Correct as of 17 April 2016

Alasdair Strokosch (born 21 February 1983, Paisley, Scotland) is a retired Scottish rugby union footballer who last played in the Pro D2 for USA Perpignan. He previously played for Gloucester in the Aviva Premiership and Edinburgh in the Pro12. He played as a flanker.

Strokosch started his professional career with Edinburgh Rugby. Before his first professional contract he played with Boroughmuir and East Kilbride rugby clubs.

Strokosch has represented Scotland in various competitions with the 'Sevens' and 'A' teams, his first full international cap for the Senior Scotland squad being on 25 November 2006 against Australia.

Strokosch is a member of the Scottish Institute of Sport. At the age of 12 became a black belt in karate, later representing Scotland at the European and world Under-21 karate championships. His father is German and his mother Scottish.

He was selected in the Scotland squad for the 2015 Rugby World Cup. He announced his retirement from international rugby on 5 November 2015.
