= Rodrigo Roncero =

Argentine rugby union player (born 1977)

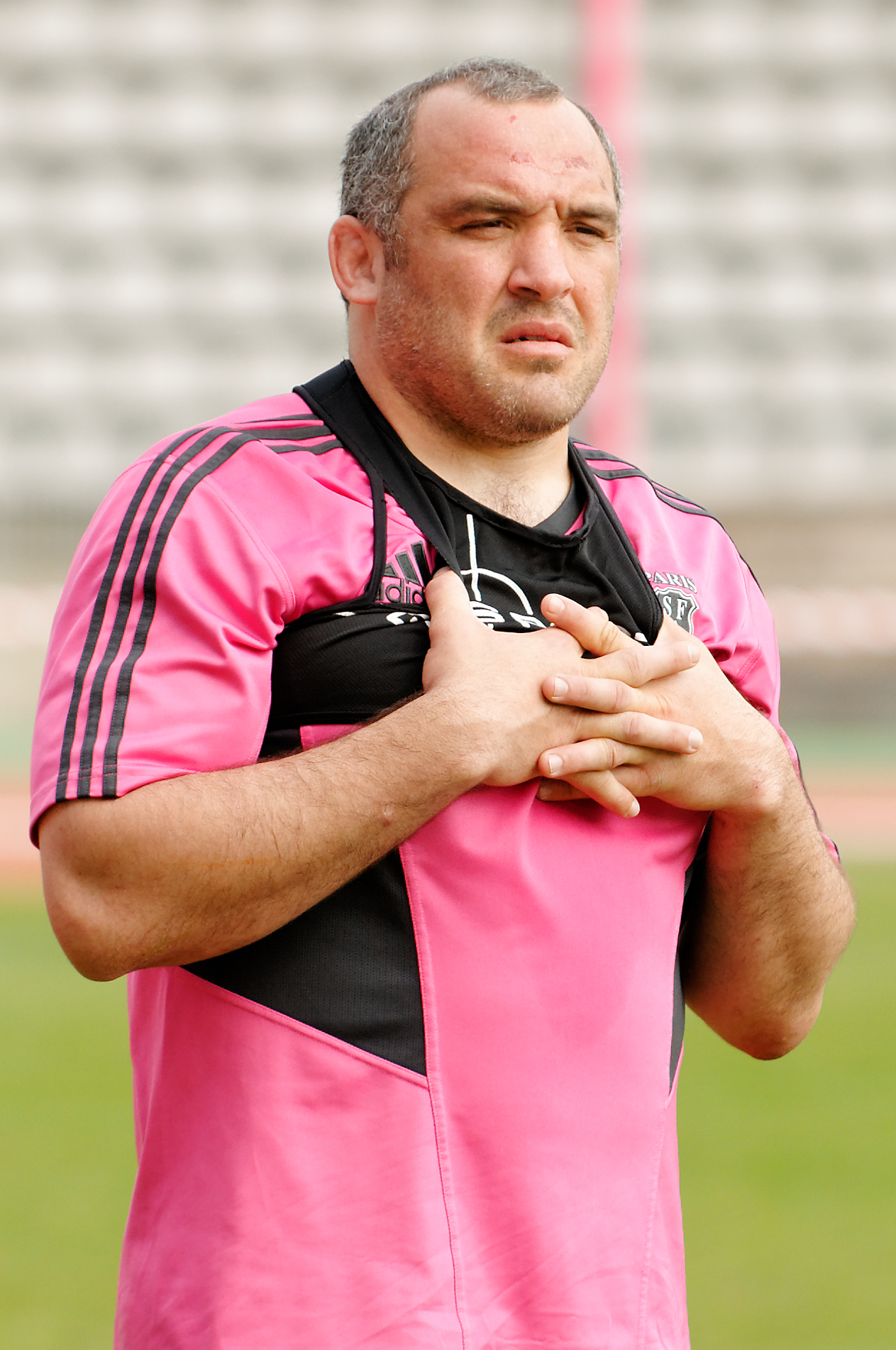
- Training session of Stade Français
- Born: Rodrigo Roncero; 16 February 1977 (age 49) Buenos Aires, Argentina
- Height: 5 ft 10 in (1.78 m)
- Weight: 242 lb (110 kg)

Rugby union career
- Position: Prop
Senior career
Years	Team	Apps	(Points)
–2002	Dep. Francesa		
2002–04	Gloucester	15	(15)
2004–12	Stade Français	194	(70)
- Correct as of 10 September 2012
International career
Years	Team	Apps	(Points)
1998–2012	Argentina	55	(30)
- Correct as of 7 October 2012

Rodrigo Roncero, also known as "RoRo" (born 16 February 1977, in Buenos Aires), is a retired Argentine former rugby union player. The last team in which he played was Stade Français in the Top 14. He has also played for Gloucester Rugby in the Guinness Premiership from 2002 to 2004. Roncero also played for Argentina, usually as a prop. Whilst at Gloucester he was a replacement in the 2003 Powergen Cup Final in which Gloucester defeated Northampton Saints.

Like his teammate Felipe Contepomi, Rodrigo is a qualified doctor.

Roncero made his first appearance for Argentina on 15 September 1998 in a match against Japan. He made three appearances in 2002 as well. Roncero was included in a mid-week Pumas side to play South Africa A, that Marcelo Loffreda was using to determine part of his squad for the 2003 Rugby World Cup. He was included in the Pumas' 2003 Rugby World Cup squad, playing in matches against Namibia and Romania.

He was capped five times for Argentina in 2004, including in a match against the All Blacks. Roncero played another five times for Argentina in 2005. He also played in Argentina's 2006 mid-year series against Wales and the All Blacks.

In 2007 he was selected to join the Argentina squad for the 2007 Rugby World Cup which succeed in gaining Argentina's highest world cup finish of third place.

He played five internationals in 2008 and five in 2009.

In the issue of Rugby World magazine published in December 2009 (and dated January 2010), the columnist Stephen Jones ranked Roncero as the ninth best player in the world at the time of his writing.

Rodrigo was part of Argentine squad for the 2011 Rugby World Cup in New Zealand.

He has developed a reputation as one of the world game's most destructive scrummagers. On 6 October 2012, Roncero played his last game in international rugby against the Wallabies during The Rugby Championship in his country.

== Honours ==
(France) Stade Français

- Top 14: 2006–07
