= Marcos Ayerza =

Argentine rugby union player (born 1983)

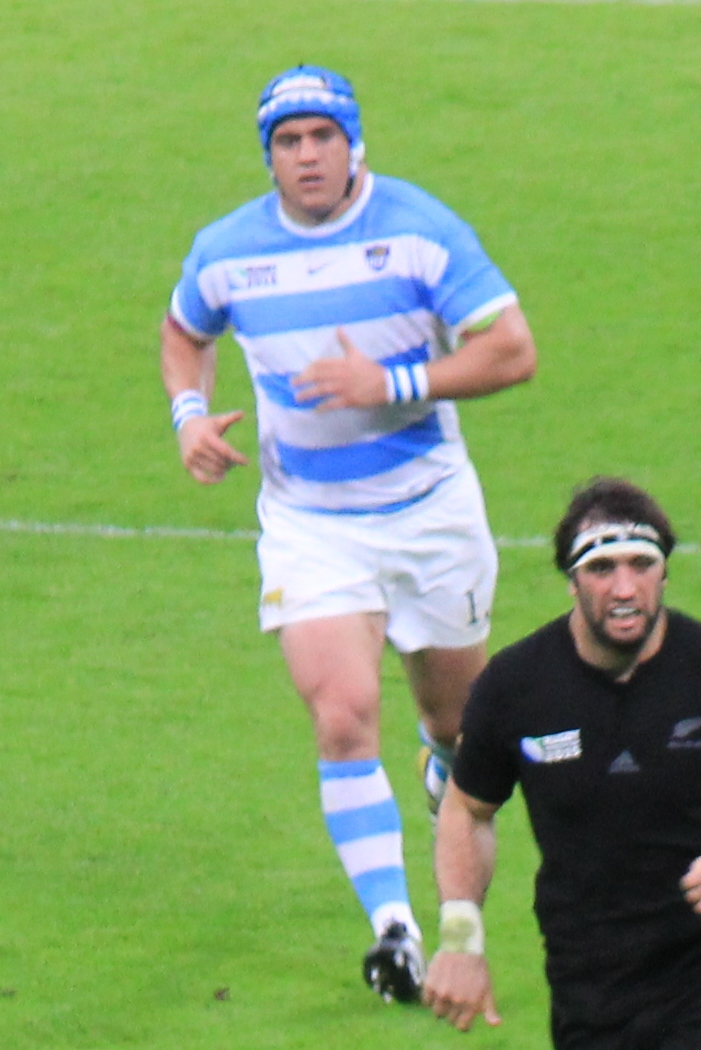
- Born: Marcos Ivan Ayerza; January 12, 1983 (age 43) Buenos Aires, Argentina
- Height: 1.85 m (6 ft 1 in)
- Weight: 115 kg (18 st 2 lb)
- School: Colegio Cardenal Newman, (Buenos Aires)

Rugby union career
- Position: Loosehead prop
Amateur team(s)
Years	Team	Apps	(Points)
-2006	Newman		
Senior career
Years	Team	Apps	(Points)
2006–2017	Leicester Tigers	246	(40)
- Correct as of 17 April 2017
International career
Years	Team	Apps	(Points)
2004–2017	Argentina	66	(5)
- Correct as of 25 October 2015

Marcos Ayerza (born January 12, 1983, in Buenos Aires) is an Argentine retired rugby union player who played loose-head prop for the Leicester Tigers and his national team. His passion and aggression on the field earned him the nickname "El Toro" (The Bull).

== Club career ==
He joined Leicester in 2006, having previously played rugby for his school Colegio Cardenal Newman and then for Club Newman in Buenos Aires. His Tigers debut came as a late call-up when Alex Moreno was injured in the warm-up, against Bath Rugby in September 2006.

In January 2008, he signed a three-year contract extension with Tigers along with fellow prop Martin Castrogiovanni.

He started in the 2007 Premiership final victory against Gloucester and the back-to-back Premiership titles in 2009 and 2010. The 2009 final was against London Irish, and the 2010 final was against Saracens. He started in losing Heineken Cup finals in 2007 and 2009 and the losing Premiership finals of 2011 and 2012.

In December 2014 Ayerza made his 200th appearance for Leicester against Northampton and in January 2015 it was announced Tigers would play Argentina as part of a testimonial year in Ayerza's honour.

In September 2016 he made his 200th start against Wasps becoming only the 86th player in the club's history to make 200 starts.

In April 2017, following medical advice regarding a back injury sustained in November 2016, Ayerza retired from professional rugby. This followed 11 seasons at Welford Road, totalling 246 games as part of a squad that won 4 Premiership titles.

== International ==
Ayerza has represented Argentina at under-19 and under-21 level, playing in both the 2003 and 2004 under-21 World Championships.

His international debut for the full Argentina side was in December 2004 against the Springboks. His only international try was scored against Japan in April 2005. He competed in qualifying matches for the 2007 Rugby World Cup and was capped twice during that competition, collecting a bronze medal as Argentina came third. He has played on both sides of the scrum internationally.

== Personal life ==
Ayerza is from Buenos Aires and is one of ten children. He is completing a degree in business studies.

Outside of rugby, Ayerza's hobbies include playing the piano and polo. His family has a long tradition in horse racing, which he attributed to his Irish ancestors, and run a stud farm. An accomplished polo player, he named one of the horses Welford Road after the Leicester Tigers' home ground Welford Road Stadium.
