= Nicolás Vergallo =

Argentine rugby union player

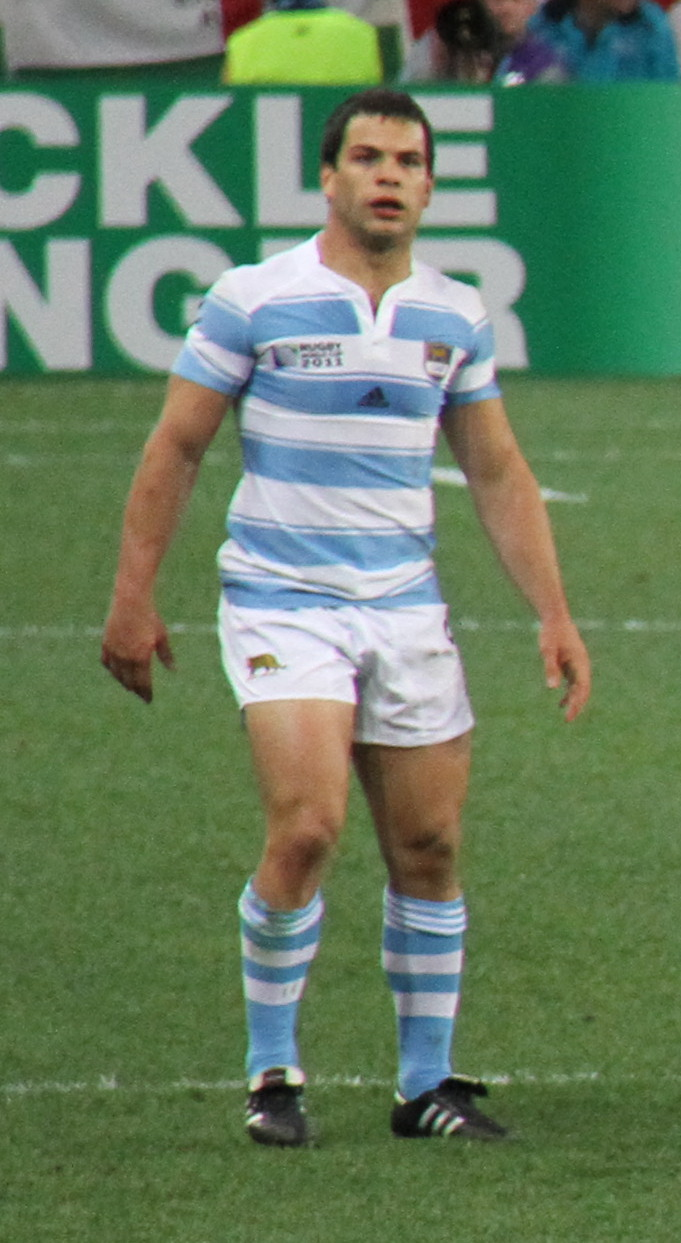
- Argentina vs England at 2011 Rugby World Cup
- Full name: Nicolás Vergallo
- Born: 20 August 1983 (age 43) Rosario, Argentina
- Height: 1.68 m (5 ft 6 in)
- Weight: 81 kg (179 lb; 12 st 11 lb)

Rugby union career
- Position: Scrum-half
- Current team: Lyon
Senior career
Years	Team	Apps	(Points)
2004–2008	Jockey Club de Rosario		
2008–2010	Dax	47	(10)
2010–2012	Toulouse	24	(8)
2013	Southern Kings	14	(5)
2013	Eastern Province Kings	5	(5)
2013–present	Lyon	3	(0)
- Correct as of 23 October 2013
International career
Years	Team	Apps	(Points)
2006–2007	Argentina Jaguars		
2005–present	Argentina	33	(0)
- Correct as of 17 June 2013

Nicolás Vergallo (born 20 August 1983 in Rosario) is an Argentine rugby union footballer, currently playing in France for Lyon. He plays at scrum-half.

== Career ==
=== Club ===
He played for Jockey Club de Rosario in Argentina between 2004 and 2008. He then moved to France, where he played for Dax, making 47 appearances.

=== Toulouse ===
After playing for Dax, he then signed for Top 14 team Toulouse, winning the 2010–11 and 2011–12 Top 14 seasons.

=== Kings ===
In October 2012, Toulouse announced that it had released Vergallo from his contract, which was supposed to end in 2014. This freed him up to sign with the Port Elizabeth-based Super Rugby franchise, the Southern Kings. Vergallo was the second-choice scrum-half for the Southern Kings during the 2013 Super Rugby season behind Shaun Venter. He made just three starts – against the Brumbies, the Stormers and the Sharks – as well as eleven substitute appearances. He scored one try, a consolation try in their home match against the Cheetahs.

He was an unused substitute in both legs of the Kings' Super Rugby promotion/relegation play-offs against the Lions.

At the end of the Super Rugby season, he initially seemed to be set to stay with the Kings, appearing in the Eastern Province Kings squad for the 2013 Currie Cup First Division season and making five starts. However, he later left to join the French Pro D2 side Lyon.

=== International ===
He made his debut for Argentina on 3 Dec 2005 against Samoa. He also played in the 2011 Rugby World Cup. In 2012 Vergallo was part of the Pumas team that played in the inaugural Rugby Championship.
