= Santiago Fernández (rugby union) =

Argentine rugby union player (born 1985)

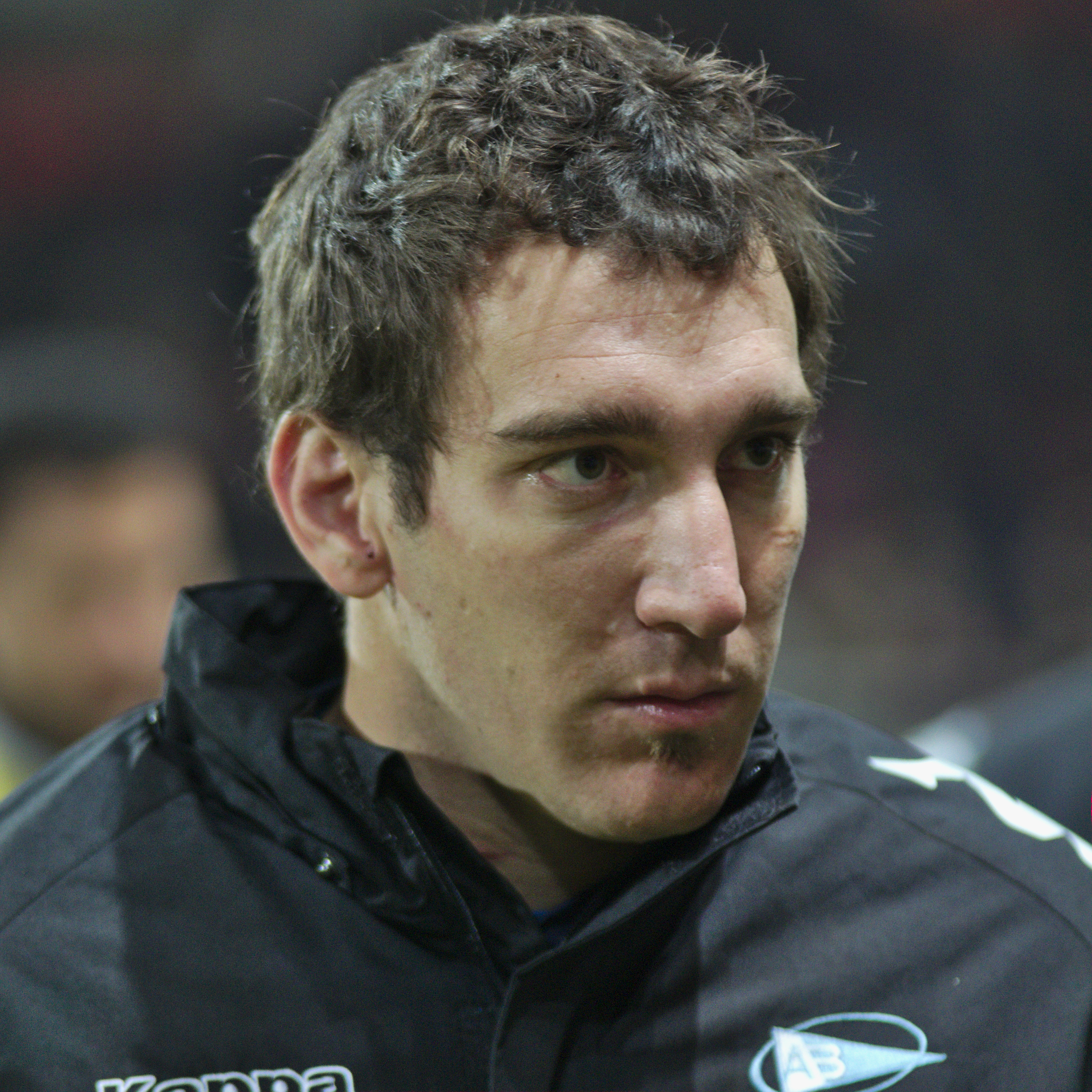
- Born: Santiago Fernández; 28 November 1985 (age 40) Buenos Aires, Argentina
- Height: 6 ft 0 in (1.83 m)
- Weight: 13 st (83 kg; 180 lb)

Rugby union career
- Position(s): Fly-half, Centre
Amateur team(s)
Years	Team	Apps	(Points)
- Hindú Club
Senior career
Years	Team	Apps	(Points)
2009–11	Pampas XV	6	(5)
2011–13	Montpellier	72	(57)
2013–15	Bayonne	45	(44)
2015–17	Pau	15	(11)
2017–25	Hindú Club	-	(-)
- Correct as of 10 Nov 2026
International career
Years	Team	Apps	(Points)
2004	Argentina U19		
2005–06	Argentina U21		
2007	Argentina A	3	(29)
2009	Argentina Jaguars	2	(22)
2008–	Argentina	31	(13)
- Correct as of 10 Nov 2026

Santiago Fernández (born 28 November 1985 in Buenos Aires) is a former Argentine rugby footballer who played for Pau, Bayonne, Montpellier and amateur side Hindu Club, although he was paid by the Argentine Rugby Union as one of their better home-based players. His preferred position was at fly-half, although he could also play at centre. A starlet for the age group teams in Argentina as well as the sevens team Fernandez has been capped at full team level and played at the 2011 Rugby World Cup in New Zealand.

Fernández replaced Felipe Contepomi in Argentina's autumn tour in Europe.
