= Alejandro Campos =

Argentine rugby union player (born 1983)

- Born: Alejandro Tomas Campos; April 21, 1983 (age 43) Buenos Aires, Argentina
- Height: 1.90 m (6 ft 3 in)
- Weight: 107 kg (16 st 12 lb)

Rugby union career
- Position(s): Flanker, Number eight
Amateur team(s)
Years	Team	Apps	(Points)
2005–08	Puerreydón		
Senior career
Years	Team	Apps	(Points)
2008–09	Clermont		
2009–10	Montauban		
2010–	Agen		
- Correct as of 2010-04-17
International career
Years	Team	Apps	(Points)
2007–	Argentina	8	(5)
- Correct as of 2010-04-17

Alejandro Tomas Campos (born 21 April 1983) is an Argentine rugby union player who plays at flanker or number eight in the Top 14, for Agen. He has also represented Argentina.
