= 2008 New Zealand rugby union tour =

Summary
P	W	D	L
Total
6	6	0	0
Test match
5	5	0	0
Opponent
P	W	D	L
Australia
1	1	0	0
Scotland
1	1	0	0
Ireland
1	1	0	0
Wales
1	1	0	0
England
1	1	0	0

The 2008 New Zealand rugby union tour was a series of matches played in Hong Kong, United Kingdom and Ireland in November 2008, by New Zealand national rugby union team.

The All Blacks obtained their third Grand Slam after the 1978 tour and 2005 New Zealand rugby union tour of Britain and Ireland.

The tour opened with a match against Australia in Hong Kong, valid for Bledisloe Cup.

== Bledisloe Cup ==
A First match was played in Hong Kong against Australia. It was the fourth match between the two teams. Winning the match, the All Blacks, won the series (3–1) and retained the Bledisloe Cup.

1 November 2008

Australia	14–19	New Zealand
Try: Mitchell 8'; Mitchell 25'; Con: Giteau 8' e 25'; Pen: Carter 12' 23' 31'	Report	Try: Sivivatu 41'; McCaw 82'; Pen: Carter 12' 23' 31'

So Kon Po, Hong Kong
Attendance: 39,682
Referee: Alan Lewis (Ireland)

Team details

Australia	New Zealand

Adam Ashley-Cooper	FB	15	FB	Isaia Toeava (substituted off) 74'
Peter Hynes	W	14	W	Hosea Gear
(substituted off) 53' Ryan Cross	C	13	C	Conrad Smith
(capt.) Stirling Mortlock	C	12	C	Dan Carter
Drew Mitchell	W	11	W	Sitiveni Sivivatu
Matt Giteau	FH	10	FH	Stephen Donald (substituted off) 47'
Luke Burgess	SH	9	SH	Jimmy Cowan (substituted off) 50'
Richard Brown	N8	8	N8	Rodney So'oialo 16' to 29'
(substituted off) 74' George Smith	F	7	F	Richie McCaw (capt.)
Dean Mumm	F	6	F	Jerome Kaino (substituted off) 72'
(substituted off) 64' Nathan Sharpe	L	5	L	Ali Williams
Mark Chisholm	L	4	L	Brad Thorn (substituted off) 63'
(substituted off) 71' Al Baxter	P	3	P	Neemia Tialata (substituted off) 63'
Stephen Moore	H	2	H	Andrew Hore (substituted off) 4'
Benn Robinson	P	1	P	Tony Woodcock
		Replacements
Tatafu Polota-Nau		16	H	Keven Mealamu (substituted on) 4'
(substituted on) 71' Matt Dunning	P	17	P	Greg Somerville (substituted on) 63'
(substituted on) 64' Phil Waugh	L	18	L	Anthony Boric (substituted on) 63'
(substituted on) 74' David Pocock	F	19	N8	Adam Thomson (substituted on) (substituted off) 16–29 (substituted on) 72'
Sam Cordingley		20	SH	Piri Weepu (substituted on) 50'
(substituted on) 53' Berrick Barnes	C	21	FH	Ma'a Nonu (substituted on) 47'
Lachie Turner		22	FB	Cory Jane (substituted on) 74'
		Coaches
(New Zealand) Robbie Deans				Graham Henry (New Zealand)

== Grand Slam ==
=== Scotland ===
The first test gave All Blacks an easy victory, with Richie McCaw and Dan Carter on the bench of reserves.

8 November 2008

Scotland	6–32	New Zealand
Pen: Paterson (2) 1', 21'	Report	Try: Tutavake 8'; Weepu 25'; Kahui 41'; Boric 73'; Pen: Donald 8'; Carter 73'

Murrayfield, Edinburgh
Attendance: 51,000
Referee: Wayne Barnes (England)

Team details

Scotland	New Zealand

Scotland			New Zealand
Chris Paterson	FB	15	FB	Isaia Toeava (substituted off) 41'
Thom Evans	W	14	W	Anthony Tuitavake
Ben Cairns	C	13	C	Richard Kahui
(yellow card) 3' to 13' Nick de Luca	C	12	C	Ma'a Nonu
(substituted off) 42' Sean Lamont	W	11	W	Joe Rokocoko
(substituted off) 70' Phil Godman	FH	10	FH	Stephen Donald
(substituted off) 70' (capt.) Mike Blair	SH	9	SH	Piri Weepu (substituted off) 52'
Ally Hogg	N8	8	N8	Liam Messam
John Barclay	F	7	F	Adam Thomson (substituted off) 59'
(substituted off) 61' Jason White	F	6	F	Kieran Read
Jim Hamilton	L	5	L	Ali Williams (substituted off) 65'
(substituted off) 54' Nathan Hines	L	4	L	Anthony Boric (yellow card) 30' to 40'
(substituted off) 54' (substituted on) 64' Euan Murray	P	3	P	John Afoa
(substituted off) 63' Ross Ford	H	2	H	Keven Mealamu (capt.) (substituted off) 60'
(substituted off) 64' Allan Jacobsen	P	1	P	Jamie Mackintosh (substituted off) 54'
		Replacements
(substituted on) 63' Dougie Hall	H	16	H	Corey Flynn (substituted on) 60'
(substituted on) 54' Alasdair Dickinson	P	17	P	Neemia Tialata (substituted on) 54'
(substituted on) 54' Matt Mustchin	L	18	L	Ross Filipo (substituted on) 65'
(substituted on) 61' Scott Gray	F	19	F	Richie McCaw (substituted on) 59'
(substituted on) 70' Rory Lawson	SH	20	SH	Andy Ellis (substituted on) 52' (substituted off) 71'
(substituted on) 70' Dan Parks	FH	21	FH	Dan Carter (substituted on) 71'
(substituted on) 42' Hugo Southwell	W	22	FB	Cory Jane (substituted on) 41'
		Coaches
(Scotland) Frank Hadden				Graham Henry (New Zealand)

=== Ireland ===
Also again Ireland, the All Blacks obtain a good victory, but the first half (close 10–3) was not easy, and the All Blacks lead the match only thanks a penalty try in the last minute of the half.

15 November 2008

Ireland	3–22	New Zealand
Pen: O'Gara 37	report	Try: Penalty try 40'; Nonu 47' Thorn 52'; Con: Carter 40' 47'; Pen: Carter 24

Croke Park, Dublin
Attendance: 78,000
Referee: Mark Lawrence (South Africa)

Team details

Ireland	New Zealand

(substituted off) 71' Girvan Dempsey	FB	15	FB	Mils Muliaina
(yellow card) 41' to 51' Tommy Bowe	W	14	W	Joe Rokocoko (substituted off) 75'
(capt.) Brian O'Driscoll	C	13	C	Conrad Smith (substituted off) 64'
(substituted off) 74' Luke Fitzgerald	C	12	C	Ma'a Nonu
Rob Kearney	W	11	W	Sitiveni Sivivatu
Ronan O'Gara	FH	10	FH	Dan Carter
(substituted off) 67' Tomás O'Leary	SH	9	SH	Jimmy Cowan (substituted off) 59'
Jamie Heaslip	N8	8	N8	Rodney So'oialo (substituted off) 71'
(substituted off) 77' David Wallace	F	7	F	Richie McCaw (capt.)
Alan Quinlan	F	6	F	Jerome Kaino (substituted off) (substituted on) 45'-54'
(substituted off) 61' Paul O'Connell	L	5	L	Ali Williams
Donncha O'Callaghan	L	4	L	Brad Thorn
(substituted off) 76' John Hayes	P	3	P	Neemia Tialata (substituted off) 54' (substituted on) 67'
(substituted off) 57' Rory Best	H	2	H	Keven Mealamu (substituted off) 65'
Marcus Horan	P	1	P	Tony Woodcock (yellow card) 42' to 52' (substituted off) 67'
		Replacements
(substituted on) 57' Jerry Flannery	H	16	H	Corey Flynn (substituted on) 65'
(substituted on) 76' Tony Buckley	P	17	P	John Afoa (substituted on) 45'
(substituted on) 61' Stephen Ferris	L	18		Anthony Boric
(substituted on) 77' Shane Jennings	F	19	N8	Kieran Read (substituted on) 71'
(substituted on) 67' Eoin Reddan	SH	20	SH	Piri Weepu (substituted on) 59'
(substituted on) 74' Paddy Wallace	C	21	W	Stephen Donald (substituted on) 75'
(substituted on) 71' Keith Earls	FB	22	C	Isaia Toeava (substituted on) 64'
		Coaches
(Ireland) Declan Kidney				Graham Henry (New Zealand)

=== Munster ===
18 November 2008

Munster	16–18	New Zealand
Try: Murphy 36'; Con: Warwick 37'; Pen: Warwick 8' 15'; Drop: Warwick 21'	Report	Try: Donald 22' Rokokoco 75'; Con: Donald 23'; Pen: Donald 9' 46'

Thomond Park, Limerick
Attendance: 26,000
Referee: Romain Poite (France)

Team details

Munster	New Zealand

Doug Howlett	FB	15	FB	Cory Jane
Barry Murphy	W	14	W	Hosea Gear
(substituted off) 52' Rua Tipoki	C	13	C	Anthony Tuitavake (substituted off) 69'
Lifeimi Mafi	C	12	C	Isaia Toeava (substituted off) 65'
Ian Dowling	W	11	W	Joe Rokocoko
Paul Warwick	FH	10	FH	Stephen Donald
Peter Stringer	SH	9	SH	Piri Weepu (substituted off) 62'
(substituted off) 26' Denis Leamy	N8	8	N8	Liam Messam
Niall Ronan	F	7	F	Scott Waldrom
James Coughlan	F	6	F	Adam Thomson (substituted off) 50'
Mick O'Driscoll	L	5	L	Jason Eaton
Donncha O'Callaghan	L	4	L	Ross Filipo (substituted off) 69'
(substituted off) 41' Tim Ryan	P	3	P	Ben Franks (substituted off) 54'
(substituted off) 63' Frankie Sheahan	H	2	H	Corey Flynn (substituted off) 62'
Federico Pucciariello	P	1	P	Jamie Mackintosh
		Replacements
(substituted on) 63' Denis Fogarty	R	16	R	Hika Elliot (substituted on) 62'
(substituted on) 41' Tony Buckley	R	17	R	John Afoa (substituted on) 54'
Mark Melbourne		18	R	Brad Thorn (substituted on) 69'
(substituted on) 26' Billy Holland	R	19	R	Kieran Read (substituted on) 50'
John O'Sullivan		20	R	Alby Mathewson (substituted on) 62'
Mike Prendergast		21	R	Richard Kahui (substituted on) 65'
(substituted on) 52' Jeremy Manning	R	22	R	Mils Muliaina (substituted on) 69'
		Coaches
(Australia) Tony McGahan				Graham Henry (New Zealand)

=== Wales ===
22 November 2008

Wales	9–29	New Zealand
Pen: S.Jones 2' 13' 23'	Report	Try: Nonu 54' Kaino 80'; Con: Carter 54' Carter 80'; Pen: Carter 17' 39' 41' 63' 74'

Millennium, Cardiff
Attendance: 74,000
Referee: Jonathan Kaplan (South Africa)

Team details

Wales	New Zealand

Wales			New Zealand
Lee Byrne	FB	15	FB	Mils Muliaina
Leigh Halfpenny	W	14	W	Joe Rokocoko
Tom Shanklin	C	13	C	Richard Kahui
Jamie Roberts	C	12	C	Ma'a Nonu
Shane Williams	W	11	W	Sitiveni Sivivatu
(substituted off) 57' Stephen Jones	FH	10	FH	Dan Carter
(substituted off) 57' Gareth Cooper	SH	9	SH	Jimmy Cowan (substituted off) 55'
Andy Powell	N8	8	N8	Rodney So'oialo
(substituted off) 75' Martyn Williams	F	7	F	Richie McCaw (capt.)
(capt.) Ryan Jones	F	6	F	Jerome Kaino
(substituted off) 56' Ian Evans	L	5	L	Ali Williams
Alun Wyn Jones	L	4	L	Brad Thorn
Adam Jones	P	3	P	Neemia Tialata (substituted off) 47'
Matthew Rees	H	2	H	Keven Mealamu
(substituted off) 79' Gethin Jenkins	P	1	P	Tony Woodcock
		Replacements
Richard Hibbard		16		Hika Elliot
(substituted on) 79' John Yapp	P	17	P	John Afoa (substituted on) 47'
(substituted on) 56' Luke Charteris	L	18		Anthony Boric
(substituted on) 75' Dafydd Jones	N8	19		Kieran Read
(substituted on) 57' Dwayne Peel	SH	20	SH	Piri Weepu (substituted on) 55'
(substituted on) 57' James Hook	FH	21		Stephen Donald
Andrew Bishop		22		Isaia Toeava
		Coaches
(New Zealand) Warren Gatland				Graham Henry (New Zealand)

=== England ===
29 November 2008

England	6–32	New Zealand
Pen: Fllod 16' Armitage 48'	Report	Try: Muliaina 58' 65' Nonu 72'; Con: Carter 73'; Pen: Carter 14' 26' 36' 38' 61'

Twickenham, London
Attendance: 81,000
Referee: A. Rolland (Ireland)

Team details

England	New Zealand

Delon Armitage	FB	15	FB	Mils Muliaina
(substituted off) 74' Paul Sackey	W	14	W	Joe Rokocoko
(substituted off) 74' Jamie Noon	C	13	C	Conrad Smith (substituted off) 68'
Riki Flutey	C	12	C	Ma'a Nonu
Ugo Monye	W	11	W	Sitiveni Sivivatu
(yellow card) 42' to 52' Toby Flood	FH	10	FH	Dan Carter
(substituted off) 60' Danny Care	SH	9	SH	Jimmy Cowan (substituted off) 69'
(substituted off) 66' Nick Easter	N8	8	N8	Rodney So'oialo
(substituted off) 57' Michael Lipman	F	7	F	Richie McCaw (capt.)
(yellow card) 31' to 41' James Haskell	F	6	F	Jerome Kaino (substituted off) 55'
Nick Kennedy	L	5	L	Ali Williams
(capt.) Steve Borthwick	L	4	L	Brad Thorn (substituted off) 68'
(substituted off) 52' Phil Vickery	P	3	P	Neemia Tialata (substituted off) 55'
(substituted off) 66' (yellow card) 23' to 33' Lee Mears	H	2	H	Keven Mealamu
Tim Payne	P	1	P	Tony Woodcock
		Replacements
(substituted on) 66' Dylan Hartley	H	16	H	Hika Elliot
(substituted on) 52' Matt Stevens	P	17	P	John Afoa (substituted on) 55'
(substituted on) 66' Tom Croft	N8	18	L	Anthony Boric (substituted on) 68'
(substituted on) 57' (yellow card) 75' to 80' Tom Rees	F	19	F	Kieran Read (substituted on) 55'
(substituted on) 60' Harry Ellis	SH	20	SH	Piri Weepu (substituted on) 69'
(substituted on) 74' Danny Cipriani	C	21		Stephen Donald
(substituted on) 74' Dan Hipkiss	W	22	C	Isaia Toeava (substituted on) 68'
		Coaches
(England) Martin Johnson				Graham Henry (New Zealand)
