= 2009 Six Nations Championship =

Rugby union tournament

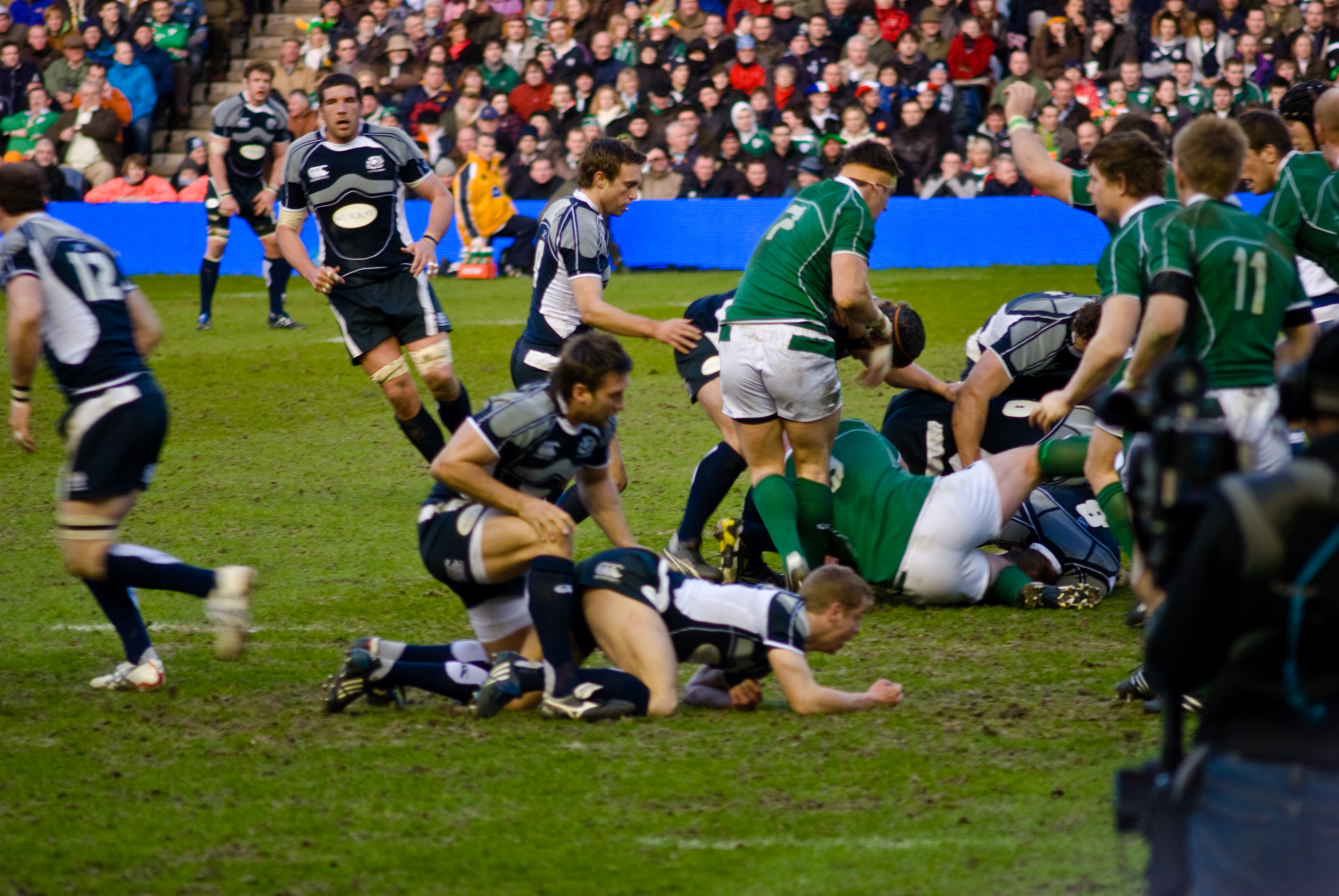
- Ireland win over Scotland on 14 March 2009
- Date: 7 February – 21 March 2009
- Countries: England; France; Ireland; Italy; Scotland; Wales

Tournament statistics
- Champions: Ireland (11th title)
- Grand Slam: Ireland (2nd title)
- Triple Crown: Ireland (10th title)
- Matches played: 15
- Attendance: 981,963 (65,464 per match)
- Tries scored: 56 (3.73 per match)
- Top point scorer: (Ireland) Ronan O'Gara (51)
- Top try scorers: (Ireland) Brian O'Driscoll (4) (England) Riki Flutey (4)
- Player of the tournament: (Ireland) Brian O'Driscoll

The 2009 Six Nations Championship, known as the RBS 6 Nations for sponsorship reasons, was the 10th Six Nations Championship, and the 115th international championship, an annual rugby union competition contested by the six major European national teams: England, France, Ireland, Italy, Scotland and Wales. The tournament was held between 7 February and 21 March 2009.

Ireland won the Grand Slam and Triple Crown, only their second Grand Slam, their first since 1948, and first Triple Crown since 2007.

England finished as runners-up, and also won the Calcutta Cup. The tournament featured the first Friday night game in its history, played between France and Wales at the Stade de France.

== Summary ==
The tournament began on 7 February 2009, when England hosted Italy in the earlier of the day's two matches. Ireland played France later that evening, with Scotland versus Wales the following day.

The reigning champions on entering the 2009 tournament were Wales, who won the Grand Slam and Triple Crown in 2008. The winners of both accolades in 2009 were Ireland, with Ronan O'Gara's dropped goal leaving the score in the final match against Wales in Cardiff on 21 March at 17–15. Wales's Stephen Jones then missed a late penalty from just inside the Ireland half to leave Wales in fourth position. Ireland's two tries in that match came when captain Brian O'Driscoll and Tommy Bowe scored in quick succession in the 44th and 46th minutes respectively. Paul O'Connell received the Triple Crown and Ireland's captain Brian O'Driscoll lifted the trophy. It was Ireland's first Grand Slam since 1948, 61 years earlier. This was achieved in the first Six Nations Championship since Declan Kidney was appointed as manager of the Ireland team, succeeding Eddie O'Sullivan who resigned after the previous tournament.

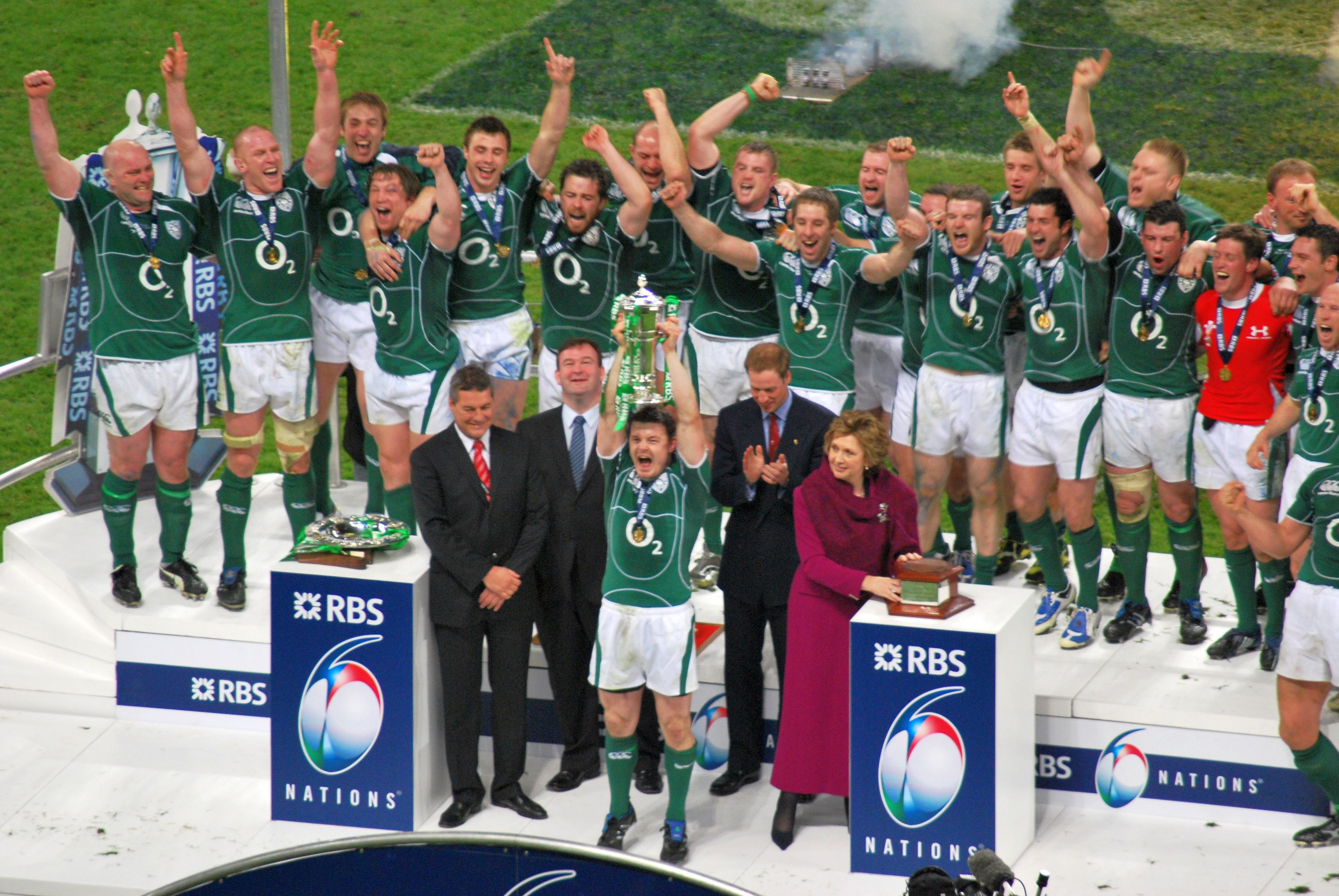
Brian O'Driscoll lifting the Six Nations cup

Twelve tries were scored by Ireland throughout the tournament, and five wins left the team on top of the table at the end of the Championship with ten points. They opened with a 30–21 win over France at home stadium Croke Park on 7 February. On 15 February, Ireland's second match was a 38–9 victory over Italy at the Stadio Flaminio in Rome. On 28 February, Ireland beat England 14–13 at Croke Park and on 14 March, Ireland beat Scotland 22–15 at Murrayfield Stadium. Then followed the Grand Slam against Wales on 21 March 2009. That game was attended by the President of Ireland Mary McAleese, who presented the trophy, and Taoiseach Brian Cowen. Following the game there were tributes from politicians. A civic reception for the team took place outside Dublin's Mansion House on 22 March at 16:30, with 18,000 fans attending alongside Taoiseach Brian Cowen and Dublin's Deputy Lord Mayor Emer Costelloe. 2,000 fans had earlier greeted the team upon their arrival at Dublin Airport. Brian O'Driscoll described 21 March as a "sweet, sweet day". The game was watched by 945,000 people in Ireland, the highest rating television programme in the country by that stage of 2009. Former coach Eddie O'Sullivan was said to be "delighted" for the team. Brian O'Driscoll was named player of the tournament, beating Italy's Sergio Parisse and Ireland teammate Paul O'Connell. O'Connell was later named captain of the British and Irish Lions team to tour South Africa and containing fourteen members of the Grand Slam winning Irish team on 21 April 2009, describing it as "a great honour".

Italy were the only side to not win a match in the tournament, suffering defeats by twenty points or more against, in addition to Ireland, France (50–8), England (36–11) and Scotland (26–6), while losing 20–15 to Wales. Scotland managed a solitary victory against Italy to finish on 2 points. England, France and Wales all managed to win three of their matches to finish level on six points but England's points difference of +54 granted them second place in the table. Their points tally was boosted by a 36–10 defeat of France and a 26–12 win against Scotland which sealed the Calcutta Cup. Wales' early loss to France and narrow loss to Ireland in the last game of the tournament denied them a second consecutive championship. Although Wales needed to beat Ireland by more than 13 points to win the championship, they could have won the game and the Triple Crown in the last minute of the tournament (as well as denying Ireland the Grand Slam) if Stephen Jones' 50-yard penalty kick had not fallen short.

== Participants ==
Nation	Home stadium	City	Head coach	Captain
England	Twickenham	London	(England) Martin Johnson	Steve Borthwick
France	Stade de France	Saint-Denis	(France) Marc Lièvremont	Lionel Nallet
Ireland	Croke Park	Dublin	(Republic of Ireland) Declan Kidney	Brian O'Driscoll
Italy	Stadio Flaminio	Rome	(South Africa) Nick Mallett	Sergio Parisse
Scotland	Murrayfield	Edinburgh	(Scotland) Frank Hadden	Mike Blair
Wales	Millennium Stadium	Cardiff	(New Zealand) Warren Gatland	Ryan Jones

== Table ==
Pos	Team	Pld	W	D	L	PF	PA	PD	T	Pts
1	Ireland	5	5	0	0	121	73	+48	12	10
2	England	5	3	0	2	124	70	+54	16	6
3	France	5	3	0	2	124	101	+23	14	6
4	Wales	5	3	0	2	100	81	+19	8	6
5	Scotland	5	1	0	4	79	102	−23	4	2
6	Italy	5	0	0	5	49	170	−121	2	0

Source: ESPN
Rules for classification: The first tiebreaker is point difference from all matches, the second is tries scored. After these two tiebreakers the championship is shared.

== Fixtures ==
The fixtures for the 2009 Six Nations were released on 17 April 2008. The France v Wales game on 27 February was the first Friday night game in the history of the championship, both under the Five and Six Nations format.

=== Round 1 ===
7 February 2009
15:00 GMT

England	36–11	Italy
Try: Goode 2' c Ellis (2) 18' m, 54' c Flutey 28' c Cueto 78' c Con: Goode (4/5); Pen: Goode (1/3) 36'	Report	Try: Mi. Bergamasco 72' m Pen: McLean (2/3) 34', 39'

Twickenham Stadium, London
Attendance: 82,000
Referee: Mark Lawrence (South Africa)

FB	15	Delon Armitage
RW	14	Paul Sackey
OC	13	Jamie Noon		(substituted off) 73'
IC	12	Riki Flutey		(substituted off) 60'
LW	11	Mark Cueto
FH	10	Andy Goode
SH	9	Harry Ellis		(substituted off) 60'
N8	8	Nick Easter
OF	7	Steffon Armitage		(substituted off) 62'
BF	6	James Haskell	(yellow card) 34'
RL	5	Nick Kennedy		(substituted off) 73'
LL	4	Steve Borthwick (c)
TP	3	Phil Vickery
HK	2	Lee Mears		(substituted off) 55'
LP	1	Andrew Sheridan		(substituted off) 60'
Replacements:
HK	16	Dylan Hartley		(substituted on) 55'
PR	17	Julian White		(substituted on) 60'
LK	18	Tom Croft		(substituted on) 73'
FL	19	Joe Worsley		(substituted on) 62'
SH	20	Ben Foden		(substituted on) 60'
CE	21	Shane Geraghty	(yellow card) 63'	(substituted on) 60'
CE	22	Mathew Tait		(substituted on) 73'
Coach:
Martin Johnson

FB	15	Andrea Masi
RW	14	Kaine Robertson
OC	13	Gonzalo Canale
IC	12	Gonzalo García	(substituted off) 55'
LW	11	Mirco Bergamasco
FH	10	Andrea Marcato	(substituted off) 29'
SH	9	Mauro Bergamasco	(substituted off) 41'
N8	8	Sergio Parisse (c)
OF	7	Alessandro Zanni
BF	6	Josh Sole
RL	5	Marco Bortolami	(substituted off) 55'
LL	4	Santiago Dellapè	(substituted off) 76'
TP	3	Martin Castrogiovanni
HK	2	Fabio Ongaro	(substituted off) 55'
LP	1	Salvatore Perugini	(substituted off) 60'
Replacements:
HK	16	Carlo Festuccia	(substituted on) 55'
PR	17	Carlos Nieto	(substituted on) 60'
LK	18	Tommaso Reato	(substituted on) 55'
FL	19	Jean-François Montauriol	(substituted on) 76'
SH	20	Giulio Toniolatti	(substituted on) 41'
FH	21	Luke McLean	(substituted on) 29'
CE	22	Matteo Pratichetti	(substituted on) 55'
Coach:
Nick Mallett

7 February 2009
17:00 GMT

Ireland	30–21	France
Try: Heaslip 34' c O'Driscoll 43' c D'Arcy 66' c Con: O'Gara (3/3); Pen: O'Gara (3/5) 3', 17', 78'	Report	Try: Harinordoquy 15' c Médard 50' m Con: Beauxis (1/2); Pen: Beauxis (1/1) 76'; Drop: Beauxis (2/2) 40+1', 53'

Croke Park, Dublin
Attendance: 79,000
Referee: Nigel Owens (Wales)

FB	15	Rob Kearney	(substituted off) 80'
RW	14	Tommy Bowe
OC	13	Brian O'Driscoll (c)
IC	12	Paddy Wallace	(substituted off) 63'
LW	11	Luke Fitzgerald
FH	10	Ronan O'Gara
SH	9	Tomás O'Leary
N8	8	Jamie Heaslip
OF	7	David Wallace
BF	6	Stephen Ferris	(substituted off) 76'
RL	5	Paul O'Connell
LL	4	Donncha O'Callaghan
TP	3	John Hayes
HK	2	Jerry Flannery	(substituted off) 49'
LP	1	Marcus Horan
Replacements:
HK	16	Rory Best	(substituted on) 49'
PR	17	Tom Court
LK	18	Malcolm O'Kelly
FL	19	Denis Leamy	(substituted on) 76'
SH	20	Peter Stringer
CE	21	Gordon D'Arcy	(substituted on) 63'
FB	22	Geordan Murphy	(substituted on) 80'
Coach:
Declan Kidney

FB	15	Clément Poitrenaud	(substituted off) 79'
RW	14	Julien Malzieu
OC	13	Florian Fritz	(substituted off) 80'
IC	12	Yannick Jauzion
LW	11	Maxime Médard
FH	10	Lionel Beauxis
SH	9	Sébastien Tillous-Borde	(substituted off) 68'
N8	8	Imanol Harinordoquy	(substituted off) 71'
OF	7	Fulgence Ouedraogo
BF	6	Thierry Dusautoir
RL	5	Sébastien Chabal	(substituted off) 62'
LL	4	Lionel Nallet (c)
TP	3	Benoît Lecouls	(substituted off) 40'
HK	2	Dimitri Szarzewski	(substituted off) 58'
LP	1	Lionel Faure
Replacements:
HK	16	Benjamin Kayser	(substituted on) 58'
PR	17	Nicolas Mas	(substituted on) 40'
LK	18	Romain Millo-Chluski	(substituted on) 62'
N8	19	Louis Picamoles	(substituted on) 71'
SH	20	Morgan Parra	(substituted on) 68'
CE	21	Benoît Baby	(substituted on) 80'
WG	22	Cédric Heymans	(substituted on) 79'
Coach:
Marc Lièvremont

8 February 2009
15:00 GMT

Scotland	13–26	Wales
Try: M. Evans 69' c Con: Paterson (1/1); Pen: Paterson (2/2) 32', 51'	Report	Try: Shanklin 22' m A. W. Jones 29' m Halfpenny 41' m S. Williams 58' m Pen: S. Jones (2/3) 13', 40+1'

Murrayfield Stadium, Edinburgh
Attendance: 63,000
Referee: Alain Rolland (Ireland)

FB	15	Hugo Southwell
RW	14	Simon Webster		(substituted off) 21'
OC	13	Ben Cairns		(substituted off) 52'
IC	12	Graeme Morrison
LW	11	Sean Lamont
FH	10	Phil Godman
SH	9	Mike Blair (c)		(substituted off) 62'
N8	8	Simon Taylor
OF	7	John Barclay		(substituted off) 56'
BF	6	Ally Hogg		(substituted off) 73'
RL	5	Jim Hamilton
LL	4	Jason White
TP	3	Geoff Cross	(yellow card) 20'	(substituted off) 31'
HK	2	Ross Ford		(substituted off) 62'
LP	1	Allan Jacobsen
Replacements:
HK	16	Dougie Hall		(substituted on) 62'
PR	17	Alasdair Dickinson		(substituted on) 31'
LK	18	Kelly Brown		(substituted on) 73'
FL	19	Scott Gray		(substituted on) 56'
SH	20	Chris Cusiter		(substituted on) 62'
WG	21	Chris Paterson		(substituted on) 21'
CE	22	Max Evans		(substituted on) 52'
Coach:
Frank Hadden

FB	15	Lee Byrne
RW	14	Leigh Halfpenny
OC	13	Tom Shanklin
IC	12	Jamie Roberts		(substituted off) 60'
LW	11	Shane Williams		(substituted off) 72'
FH	10	Stephen Jones		(substituted off) 63'
SH	9	Mike Phillips		(substituted off) 60'
N8	8	Andy Powell
OF	7	Martyn Williams (c)	(yellow card) 66'
BF	6	Dafydd Jones
RL	5	Alun Wyn Jones
LL	4	Ian Gough		(substituted off) 63'
TP	3	Adam Jones
HK	2	Matthew Rees		(substituted off) 63'
LP	1	Gethin Jenkins		(substituted off) 63'
Replacements:
HK	16	Huw Bennett		(substituted on) 63'
PR	17	John Yapp		(substituted on) 63'
LK	18	Luke Charteris		(substituted on) 63'
FL	19	Bradley Davies		(substituted on) 72'
SH	20	Dwayne Peel		(substituted on) 60'
FH	21	James Hook		(substituted on) 63'
CE	22	Andrew Bishop		(substituted on) 60'
Coach:
Warren Gatland

=== Round 2 ===
14 February 2009
16:00 CET

France	22–13	Scotland
Try: Ouedraogo 46' c Con: Beauxis (1/1); Pen: Beauxis (5/7) 23', 38', 53', 60', 73'	Report	Try: T. Evans 69' c Con: Paterson (1/1); Pen: Godman (2/3) 35', 49'

Stade de France, Saint-Denis
Attendance: 79,600
Referee: George Clancy (Ireland)

FB	15	Clément Poitrenaud
RW	14	Maxime Médard
OC	13	Benoît Baby	(substituted off) 59'
IC	12	Yannick Jauzion
LW	11	Cédric Heymans
FH	10	Lionel Beauxis
SH	9	Sébastien Tillous-Borde	(substituted off) 67'
N8	8	Imanol Harinordoquy	(substituted off) 70'
OF	7	Fulgence Ouedraogo
BF	6	Thierry Dusautoir
RL	5	Lionel Nallet (c)
LL	4	Romain Millo-Chluski	(substituted off) 59'
TP	3	Nicolas Mas	(substituted off) 41'
HK	2	Dimitri Szarzewski	(substituted off) 55'
LP	1	Fabien Barcella
Replacements:
HK	16	Benjamin Kayser	(substituted on) 55'
PR	17	Renaud Boyoud	(substituted on) 41'
LK	18	Sébastien Chabal	(substituted on) 59'
N8	19	Louis Picamoles	(substituted on) 70'
SH	20	Morgan Parra	(substituted on) 67'
CE	21	Maxime Mermoz	(substituted on) 59'
WG	22	Julien Malzieu
Coach:
Marc Lièvremont

FB	15	Hugo Southwell
RW	14	Simon Danielli	(substituted off) 66'
OC	13	Max Evans
IC	12	Graeme Morrison	(substituted off) 73'
LW	11	Thom Evans
FH	10	Phil Godman
SH	9	Mike Blair (c)	(substituted off) 73'
N8	8	Simon Taylor
OF	7	John Barclay
BF	6	Alasdair Strokosch
RL	5	Jim Hamilton	(substituted off) 18'
LL	4	Jason White
TP	3	Alasdair Dickinson	(substituted off) 46'
HK	2	Ross Ford	(substituted off) 66'
LP	1	Allan Jacobsen
Replacements:
HK	16	Dougie Hall	(substituted on) 66'
PR	17	Moray Low	(substituted on) 46'
LK	18	Kelly Brown	(substituted on) 18'
FL	19	Scott Gray
SH	20	Chris Cusiter	(substituted on) 73'
WG	21	Chris Paterson	(substituted on) 66'
CE	22	Nick De Luca	(substituted on) 73'
Coach:
Frank Hadden

14 February 2009
17:30 GMT

Wales	23–15	England
Try: Halfpenny 44' m Pen: S. Jones (5/5) 4', 16', 43', 54', 72'; Halfpenny 22' (1/2)	Report	Try: Sackey 24' m D. Armitage 57' c Con: Flood (1/1); Drop: Goode (1/1) 30'

Millennium Stadium, Cardiff
Attendance: 73,000
Referee: Jonathan Kaplan (South Africa)

FB	15	Lee Byrne
RW	14	Leigh Halfpenny
OC	13	Tom Shanklin
IC	12	Jamie Roberts
LW	11	Mark Jones
FH	10	Stephen Jones
SH	9	Mike Phillips	(substituted off) 73'
N8	8	Andy Powell	(substituted off) 60'
OF	7	Martyn Williams
BF	6	Ryan Jones (c)
RL	5	Alun Wyn Jones
LL	4	Ian Gough
TP	3	Adam Jones
HK	2	Matthew Rees	(substituted off) 66'
LP	1	Gethin Jenkins
Replacements:
HK	16	Huw Bennett	(substituted on) 66'
PR	17	John Yapp
LK	18	Luke Charteris
FL	19	Dafydd Jones	(substituted on) 60'
SH	20	Dwayne Peel	(substituted on) 73'
FH	21	James Hook
CE	22	Andrew Bishop
Coach:
Warren Gatland

FB	15	Delon Armitage
RW	14	Paul Sackey		(substituted off) 65'
OC	13	Mike Tindall	(yellow card) 14'
IC	12	Riki Flutey
LW	11	Mark Cueto
FH	10	Andy Goode	(yellow card) 41'	(substituted off) 53'
SH	9	Harry Ellis
N8	8	Nick Easter
OF	7	Joe Worsley
BF	6	James Haskell		(substituted off) 54'
RL	5	Nick Kennedy		(substituted off) 55'
LL	4	Steve Borthwick (c)
TP	3	Phil Vickery		(substituted off) 65'
HK	2	Lee Mears		(substituted off) 65'
LP	1	Andrew Sheridan
Replacements:
HK	16	Dylan Hartley		(substituted on) 65'
PR	17	Julian White		(substituted on) 65'
LK	18	Tom Croft		(substituted on) 55'
FL	19	Luke Narraway		(substituted on) 54'
SH	20	Paul Hodgson
FH	21	Toby Flood		(substituted on) 53'
CE	22	Mathew Tait		(substituted on) 65'
Coach:
Martin Johnson

15 February 2009
15:30 CET

Italy	9–38	Ireland
Pen: McLean (3/4) 5', 16', 24'	Report	Try: Bowe 19' c Fitzgerald (2) 40' c, 76' c D. Wallace 48' c O'Driscoll 78' c Con: O'Gara (4/4); Kearney (1/1); Pen: O'Gara (1/1) 50'

Stadio Flaminio, Rome
Attendance: 30,000
Referee: Chris White (England)

FB	15	Andrea Masi	(yellow card) 1'
RW	14	Kaine Robertson		(substituted off) 20'
OC	13	Gonzalo Canale		(substituted off) 48'
IC	12	Mirco Bergamasco
LW	11	Matteo Pratichetti
FH	10	Luke McLean		(substituted off) 72'
SH	9	Paul Griffen
N8	8	Sergio Parisse (c)
OF	7	Mauro Bergamasco
BF	6	Alessandro Zanni
RL	5	Tommaso Reato		(substituted off) 48'
LL	4	Santiago Dellapè		(substituted off) 48'
TP	3	Martin Castrogiovanni		(substituted off) 33'
HK	2	Fabio Ongaro		(substituted off) 41'
LP	1	Salvatore Perugini	(yellow card) 36'
Replacements:
HK	16	Carlo Festuccia		(substituted on) 41'
PR	17	Carlos Nieto		(substituted on) 33'
LK	18	Carlo Del Fava		(substituted on) 48'
FL	19	Josh Sole		(substituted on) 48'
SH	20	Giulio Toniolatti		(substituted on) 72'
FH	21	Gonzalo García		(substituted on) 48'
CE	22	Andrea Bacchetti		(substituted on) 20'
Coach:
Nick Mallett

FB	15	Rob Kearney
RW	14	Tommy Bowe
OC	13	Brian O'Driscoll (c)
IC	12	Paddy Wallace		(substituted off) 41'
LW	11	Luke Fitzgerald
FH	10	Ronan O'Gara	(yellow card) 32'
SH	9	Tomás O'Leary		(substituted off) 72'
N8	8	Jamie Heaslip
OF	7	David Wallace
BF	6	Stephen Ferris		(substituted off) 62'
RL	5	Paul O'Connell		(substituted off) 77'
LL	4	Donncha O'Callaghan
TP	3	John Hayes
HK	2	Jerry Flannery		(substituted off) 60'
LP	1	Marcus Horan		(substituted off) 55'
Replacements:
HK	16	Rory Best		(substituted on) 60'
PR	17	Tom Court		(substituted on) 55'
LK	18	Malcolm O'Kelly		(substituted on) 77'
FL	19	Denis Leamy		(substituted on) 62'
SH	20	Peter Stringer		(substituted on) 72'
CE	21	Gordon D'Arcy		(substituted on) 41'
FB	22	Geordan Murphy
Coach:
Declan Kidney

=== Round 3 ===
27 February 2009
21:00 CET

France	21–16	Wales
Try: Dusautoir 40' c Heymans 53' m Con: Parra (1/2); Pen: Parra (3/5) 6', 35', 70'	Report	Try: Byrne 24' c Con: S. Jones (1/1); Pen: S. Jones (2/2) 3', 9'; Hook (1/1) 73'

Stade de France, Saint-Denis
Attendance: 80,000
Referee: Mark Lawrence (South Africa)

FB	15	Maxime Médard
RW	14	Julien Malzieu
OC	13	Mathieu Bastareaud
IC	12	Yannick Jauzion
LW	11	Cédric Heymans
FH	10	Benoît Baby	(substituted off) 37'
SH	9	Morgan Parra	(substituted off) 72'
N8	8	Imanol Harinordoquy
OF	7	Fulgence Ouedraogo
BF	6	Thierry Dusautoir
RL	5	Sébastien Chabal	(substituted off) 57'
LL	4	Lionel Nallet (c)
TP	3	Sylvain Marconnet	(substituted off) 57'
HK	2	Dimitri Szarzewski	(substituted off) 65'
LP	1	Fabien Barcella
Replacements:
HK	16	Benjamin Kayser	(substituted on) 65'
PR	17	Thomas Domingo	(substituted on) 57'
LK	18	Romain Millo-Chluski	(substituted on) 57'
N8	19	Louis Picamoles
SH	20	Sébastien Tillous-Borde	(substituted on) 72'
FH	21	François Trinh-Duc	(substituted on) 37'
FB	22	Clément Poitrenaud
Coach:
Marc Lièvremont

FB	15	Lee Byrne
RW	14	Leigh Halfpenny
OC	13	Tom Shanklin
IC	12	Jamie Roberts	(substituted off) 55'
LW	11	Shane Williams
FH	10	Stephen Jones	(substituted off) 70'
SH	9	Mike Phillips	(substituted off) 55'
N8	8	Andy Powell	(substituted off) 62'
OF	7	Martyn Williams
BF	6	Ryan Jones (c)
RL	5	Alun Wyn Jones
LL	4	Ian Gough	(substituted off) 71'
TP	3	Adam Jones
HK	2	Matthew Rees	(substituted off) 55'
LP	1	Gethin Jenkins
Replacements:
HK	16	Huw Bennett	(substituted on) 55'
PR	17	John Yapp
LK	18	Luke Charteris	(substituted on) 71'
FL	19	Dafydd Jones	(substituted on) 62'
SH	20	Dwayne Peel	(substituted on) 55'
FH	21	James Hook	(substituted on) 70'
CE	22	Gavin Henson	(substituted on) 55'
Coach:
Warren Gatland

28 February 2009
15:00 GMT

Scotland	26–6	Italy
Try: Danielli 35' c Gray 64' c Con: Godman (1/1); Paterson (1/1); Pen: Paterson (3/3) 5', 13', 68'; Godman (1/2) 31'	Report	Pen: McLean (1/1) 55'; Drop: Parisse (1/1) 22'

Murrayfield Stadium, Edinburgh
Attendance: 65,000
Referee: Nigel Owens (Wales)

FB	15	Hugo Southwell	(substituted off) 47'
RW	14	Simon Danielli
OC	13	Max Evans
IC	12	Graeme Morrison	(substituted off) 67'
LW	11	Thom Evans
FH	10	Phil Godman
SH	9	Mike Blair (c)	(substituted off) 55'
N8	8	Simon Taylor
OF	7	John Barclay	(substituted off) 56'
BF	6	Alasdair Strokosch
RL	5	Alastair Kellock
LL	4	Jason White
TP	3	Euan Murray	(substituted off) 67'
HK	2	Ross Ford	(substituted off) 53'
LP	1	Allan Jacobsen	(substituted off) 68'
Replacements:
HK	16	Dougie Hall	(substituted on) 53'
PR	17	Alasdair Dickinson	(substituted on) 67'
LK	18	Kelly Brown	(substituted on) 68'
FL	19	Scott Gray	(substituted on) 56'
SH	20	Chris Cusiter	(substituted on) 55'
WG	21	Chris Paterson	(substituted on) 47'
CE	22	Nick De Luca	(substituted on) 67'
Coach:
Frank Hadden

FB	15	Andrea Marcato	(substituted off) 47'
RW	14	Mirco Bergamasco
OC	13	Gonzalo Canale
IC	12	Gonzalo García	(substituted off) 3'
LW	11	Matteo Pratichetti
FH	10	Luke McLean
SH	9	Paul Griffen	(substituted off) 55'
N8	8	Sergio Parisse (c)
OF	7	Mauro Bergamasco
BF	6	Alessandro Zanni
RL	5	Marco Bortolami	(substituted off) 77'
LL	4	Santiago Dellapè	(substituted off) 57'
TP	3	Martin Castrogiovanni	(substituted off) 58'
HK	2	Leonardo Ghiraldini	(substituted off) 58'
LP	1	Salvatore Perugini
Replacements:
HK	16	Franco Sbaraglini	(substituted on) 58'
PR	17	Carlos Nieto	(substituted on) 58'
LK	18	Carlo Del Fava	(substituted on) 57'
FL	19	Josh Sole	(substituted on) 77'
SH	20	Pablo Canavosio	(substituted on) 55'
CE	21	Andrea Bacchetti	(substituted on) 3'
WG	22	Giulio Rubini	(substituted on) 47'
Coach:
Nick Mallett

28 February 2009
17:30 GMT

Ireland	14–13	England
Try: O'Driscoll 57' m Pen: O'Gara (2/5) 27', 71'; Drop: O'Driscoll (1/2) 46'	Report	Try: D. Armitage 78' c Con: Goode (1/1); Pen: Flood (1/1) 38'; D. Armitage (1/1) 64'

Croke Park, Dublin
Attendance: 82,000
Referee: Craig Joubert (South Africa)

FB	15	Rob Kearney
RW	14	Tommy Bowe
OC	13	Brian O'Driscoll (c)
IC	12	Paddy Wallace
LW	11	Luke Fitzgerald
FH	10	Ronan O'Gara
SH	9	Tomás O'Leary	(substituted off) 65'
N8	8	Jamie Heaslip	(substituted off) 68'
OF	7	David Wallace
BF	6	Stephen Ferris
RL	5	Paul O'Connell
LL	4	Donncha O'Callaghan
TP	3	John Hayes
HK	2	Jerry Flannery	(substituted off) 68'
LP	1	Marcus Horan
Replacements:
HK	16	Rory Best	(substituted on) 68'
PR	17	Tom Court
LK	18	Mick O'Driscoll
FL	19	Denis Leamy	(substituted on) 68'
SH	20	Peter Stringer	(substituted on) 65'
CE	21	Gordon D'Arcy
FB	22	Geordan Murphy
Coach:
Declan Kidney

FB	15	Delon Armitage
RW	14	Paul Sackey		(substituted off) 57'
OC	13	Mike Tindall
IC	12	Riki Flutey
LW	11	Mark Cueto
FH	10	Toby Flood		(substituted off) 66'
SH	9	Harry Ellis		(substituted off) 58'
N8	8	Nick Easter		(substituted off) 76'
OF	7	Joe Worsley
BF	6	James Haskell
RL	5	Nick Kennedy		(substituted off) 69'
LL	4	Steve Borthwick (c)
TP	3	Phil Vickery	(yellow card) 55'
HK	2	Lee Mears		(substituted off) 66'
LP	1	Andrew Sheridan		(substituted off) 77'
Replacements:
HK	16	Dylan Hartley		(substituted on) 66'
PR	17	Julian White		(substituted on) 77'
LK	18	Tom Croft		(substituted on) 69'
FL	19	Luke Narraway		(substituted on) 76'
SH	20	Danny Care	(yellow card) 69'	(substituted on) 58'
FH	21	Andy Goode		(substituted on) 66'
CE	22	Mathew Tait		(substituted on) 57'
Coach:
Martin Johnson

Notes:

- Ireland won the Millennium Trophy.

=== Round 4 ===
14 March 2009
16:00 CET

Italy	15–20	Wales
Pen: Marcato (5/5) 5', 31', 34', 57', 70'	Report	Try: S. Williams 25' c Shanklin 71' c Con: Hook (2/2); Pen: Hook (2/3) 59', 63'

Stadio Flaminio, Rome
Referee: Alan Lewis (Ireland)

FB	15	Andrea Marcato	(substituted off) 75'
RW	14	Giulio Rubini
OC	13	Gonzalo Canale
IC	12	Mirco Bergamasco
LW	11	Matteo Pratichetti
FH	10	Luke McLean
SH	9	Paul Griffen	(substituted off) 66'
N8	8	Sergio Parisse (c)
OF	7	Mauro Bergamasco
BF	6	Alessandro Zanni
RL	5	Marco Bortolami	(substituted off) 64'
LL	4	Santiago Dellapè	(substituted off) 50'
TP	3	Carlos Nieto	(substituted off) 50'
HK	2	Leonardo Ghiraldini
LP	1	Salvatore Perugini
Replacements:
HK	16	Franco Sbaraglini
PR	17	Martin Castrogiovanni	(substituted off) 50'
LK	18	Carlo Del Fava	(substituted on) 50'
FL	19	Josh Sole	(substituted on) 64'
SH	20	Pablo Canavosio	(substituted on) 66'
FH	21	Luciano Orquera	(substituted on) 75'
CE	22	Roberto Quartaroli
Coach:
Nick Mallett

FB	15	Lee Byrne	(substituted off) 68'
RW	14	Mark Jones
OC	13	Jamie Roberts
IC	12	Gavin Henson
LW	11	Shane Williams
FH	10	James Hook	(substituted off) 75'
SH	9	Mike Phillips
N8	8	Andy Powell
OF	7	Dafydd Jones
BF	6	Jonathan Thomas	(substituted off) 57'
RL	5	Alun Wyn Jones (c)
LL	4	Luke Charteris	(substituted off) 66'
TP	3	Rhys M. Thomas	(substituted off) 57'
HK	2	Huw Bennett	(substituted off) 57'
LP	1	John Yapp
Replacements:
HK	16	Matthew Rees	(substituted on) 57'
PR	17	Gethin Jenkins	(substituted on) 57'
LK	18	Bradley Davies	(substituted on) 66'
FL	19	Ryan Jones	(substituted on) 57'
SH	20	Warren Fury
FH	21	Stephen Jones	(substituted on) 75'
CE	22	Tom Shanklin	(substituted on) 68'
Coach:
Warren Gatland

14 March 2009
17:00 GMT

Scotland	15–22	Ireland
Pen: Paterson (5/5) 5', 13', 21', 31', 60'	Report	Try: Heaslip 51' c Con: O'Gara (1/1); Pen: O'Gara (4/5) 11', 27', 33', 70'; Drop: O'Gara (1/1) 57'

Murrayfield Stadium, Edinburgh
Referee: Jonathan Kaplan (South Africa)

FB	15	Chris Paterson
RW	14	Simon Danielli
OC	13	Max Evans
IC	12	Graeme Morrison	(substituted off) 70'
LW	11	Thom Evans
FH	10	Phil Godman
SH	9	Mike Blair (c)	(substituted off) 51'
N8	8	Simon Taylor
OF	7	John Barclay	(substituted off) 67'
BF	6	Alasdair Strokosch
RL	5	Jim Hamilton
LL	4	Jason White	(substituted off) 50'
TP	3	Euan Murray
HK	2	Ross Ford	(substituted off) 57'
LP	1	Alasdair Dickinson
Replacements:
HK	16	Dougie Hall	(substituted on) 57'
PR	17	Moray Low
LK	18	Nathan Hines	(substituted on) 50'
FL	19	Scott Gray	(substituted on) 67'
SH	20	Chris Cusiter	(substituted on) 51'
CE	21	Nick De Luca	(substituted on) 70'
FB	22	Hugo Southwell
Coach:
Frank Hadden

FB	15	Rob Kearney	(substituted off) 75'
RW	14	Tommy Bowe
OC	13	Brian O'Driscoll (c)
IC	12	Gordon D'Arcy
LW	11	Luke Fitzgerald
FH	10	Ronan O'Gara
SH	9	Peter Stringer	(substituted off) 65'
N8	8	Denis Leamy	(substituted off) 30'
OF	7	David Wallace
BF	6	Stephen Ferris
RL	5	Paul O'Connell
LL	4	Donncha O'Callaghan
TP	3	John Hayes
HK	2	Rory Best	(substituted off) 61'
LP	1	Marcus Horan
Replacements:
HK	16	Jerry Flannery	(substituted on) 61'
PR	17	Tom Court
LK	18	Mick O'Driscoll
FL	19	Jamie Heaslip	(substituted on) 30'
SH	20	Tomás O'Leary	(substituted on) 65'
CE	21	Paddy Wallace
FB	22	Geordan Murphy	(substituted on) 75'
Coach:
Declan Kidney

Notes:

- Ireland won their eighth successive Centenary Quaich.

15 March 2009
15:00 GMT

England	34–10	France
Try: Cueto 1' c Flutey (2) 22' c, 41' m D. Armitage 37' c Worsley 39' m Con: Flood (3/3); Pen: Flood (1/1) 18'	Report	Try: Szarzewski 56' m Malzieu 64' m

Twickenham Stadium, London
Referee: Stuart Dickinson (Australia)

FB	15	Delon Armitage
RW	14	Mark Cueto
OC	13	Mike Tindall
IC	12	Riki Flutey
LW	11	Ugo Monye	(substituted off) 72'
FH	10	Toby Flood	(substituted off) 40'
SH	9	Harry Ellis	(substituted off) 55'
N8	8	Nick Easter
OF	7	Joe Worsley	(substituted off) 68'
BF	6	Tom Croft
RL	5	Simon Shaw	(substituted off) 57'
LL	4	Steve Borthwick (c)
TP	3	Phil Vickery
HK	2	Lee Mears	(substituted off) 57'
LP	1	Andrew Sheridan	(substituted off) 66'
Replacements:
HK	16	Dylan Hartley	(substituted on) 57'
PR	17	Julian White	(substituted on) 66'
LK	18	Nick Kennedy	(substituted on) 68'
FL	19	James Haskell	(substituted on) 57'
SH	20	Danny Care	(substituted on) 55'
FH	21	Andy Goode	(substituted on) 40'
CE	22	Mathew Tait	(substituted on) 72'
Coach:
Martin Johnson

FB	15	Maxime Médard
RW	14	Julien Malzieu
OC	13	Mathieu Bastareaud	(substituted off) 46'
IC	12	Yannick Jauzion
LW	11	Cédric Heymans
FH	10	François Trinh-Duc	(substituted off) 46'
SH	9	Morgan Parra	(substituted off) 59'
N8	8	Imanol Harinordoquy	(substituted off) 68'
OF	7	Sébastien Chabal
BF	6	Thierry Dusautoir
RL	5	Jérôme Thion	(substituted off) 46'
LL	4	Lionel Nallet (c)
TP	3	Sylvain Marconnet
HK	2	Dimitri Szarzewski	(substituted off) 59'
LP	1	Lionel Faure	(substituted off) 51'
Replacements:
HK	16	Benjamin Kayser	(substituted on) 59'
PR	17	Thomas Domingo	(substituted on) 51'
N8	18	Louis Picamoles	(substituted on) 68'
FL	19	Julien Bonnaire	(substituted on) 46'
SH	20	Sébastien Tillous-Borde	(substituted on) 59'
CE	21	Florian Fritz	(substituted on) 46'
CE	22	Damien Traille	(substituted on) 46'
Coach:
Marc Lièvremont

=== Round 5 ===
21 March 2009
14:15 CET

Italy	8–50	France
Try: Parisse 57' m Pen: Marcato (1/2) 23'	Report	Try: Chabal 25' c Trinh-Duc 29' m Médard (2) 31' c, 70' m Heymans 42' c Domingo 55' m Malzieu 76' m Con: Parra (3/4); Pen: Parra (3/3) 7', 15', 48'

Stadio Flaminio, Rome
Attendance: 27,650
Referee: Alain Rolland (Ireland)

FB	15	Andrea Marcato
RW	14	Giulio Rubini
OC	13	Gonzalo Canale
IC	12	Mirco Bergamasco
LW	11	Matteo Pratichetti	(substituted off) 48'
FH	10	Luke McLean	(substituted off) 72'
SH	9	Paul Griffen	(substituted off) 66'
N8	8	Sergio Parisse (c)
OF	7	Mauro Bergamasco
BF	6	Alessandro Zanni
RL	5	Marco Bortolami	(substituted off) 68'
LL	4	Santiago Dellapè	(substituted off) 54'
TP	3	Carlos Nieto	(substituted off) 58'
HK	2	Leonardo Ghiraldini
LP	1	Salvatore Perugini
Replacements:
HK	16	Franco Sbaraglini
PR	17	Martin Castrogiovanni	(substituted on) 58'
LK	18	Carlo Del Fava	(substituted on) 54'
FL	19	Josh Sole	(substituted on) 68'
SH	20	Pablo Canavosio	(substituted on) 66'
FH	21	Luciano Orquera	(substituted on) 72'
CE	22	Roberto Quartaroli	(substituted on) 48'
Coach:
Nick Mallett

FB	15	Damien Traille
RW	14	Maxime Médard
OC	13	Florian Fritz	(substituted off) 60'
IC	12	Yannick Jauzion
LW	11	Cédric Heymans	(substituted off) 71'
FH	10	François Trinh-Duc
SH	9	Morgan Parra	(substituted off) 52'
N8	8	Imanol Harinordoquy	(substituted off) 63'
OF	7	Julien Bonnaire
BF	6	Thierry Dusautoir
RL	5	Sébastien Chabal
LL	4	Lionel Nallet (c)	(substituted off) 71'
TP	3	Sylvain Marconnet	(substituted off) 50'
HK	2	Dimitri Szarzewski	(substituted off) 52'
LP	1	Fabien Barcella
Replacements:
HK	16	William Servat	(substituted on) 52'
PR	17	Thomas Domingo	(substituted on) 50'
LK	18	Jérôme Thion	(substituted on) 71'
N8	19	Louis Picamoles	(substituted on) 63'
FH	20	Frédéric Michalak	(substituted on) 52'
CE	21	Mathieu Bastareaud	(substituted on) 60'
WG	22	Julien Malzieu	(substituted on) 71'
Coach:
Marc Lièvremont

Notes:

- France won their third consecutive Giuseppe Garibaldi Trophy.

21 March 2009
15:30 GMT

England	26–12	Scotland
Try: Monye 22' m Flutey 28' c Tait 77' m Con: Flood (1/2); Pen: Flood (2/2) 40', 41'; Drop: Care 72'	Report	Pen: Paterson (3/3) 9', 44', 66'; Godman (1/2) 51'

Twickenham Stadium, London
Attendance: 80,688
Referee: Marius Jonker (South Africa)

FB	15	Delon Armitage
RW	14	Mark Cueto
OC	13	Mike Tindall
IC	12	Riki Flutey
LW	11	Ugo Monye	(substituted off) 48'
FH	10	Toby Flood	(substituted off) 73'
SH	9	Harry Ellis	(substituted off) 16'
N8	8	Nick Easter
OF	7	Joe Worsley
BF	6	Tom Croft	(substituted off) 73'
RL	5	Simon Shaw	(substituted off) 57'
LL	4	Steve Borthwick (c)
TP	3	Phil Vickery	(substituted off) 14'
HK	2	Lee Mears	(substituted off) 73'
LP	1	Andrew Sheridan
Replacements:
HK	16	Dylan Hartley	(substituted on) 73'
PR	17	Julian White	(substituted on) 14'
LK	18	Nick Kennedy	(substituted on) 57'
FL	19	James Haskell	(substituted on) 73'
SH	20	Danny Care	(substituted on) 16'
FH	21	Andy Goode	(substituted on) 73'
CE	22	Mathew Tait	(substituted on) 48'
Coach:
Martin Johnson

FB	15	Chris Paterson
RW	14	Simon Danielli	(substituted off) 75'
OC	13	Max Evans
IC	12	Graeme Morrison
LW	11	Thom Evans	(substituted off) 44'
FH	10	Phil Godman
SH	9	Mike Blair (c)	(substituted off) 68'
N8	8	Simon Taylor	(substituted off) 41'
OF	7	Scott Gray
BF	6	Alasdair Strokosch
RL	5	Jim Hamilton
LL	4	Jason White	(substituted off) 57'
TP	3	Euan Murray
HK	2	Ross Ford	(substituted off) 67'
LP	1	Alasdair Dickinson	(substituted off) 75'
Replacements:
HK	16	Dougie Hall	(substituted on) 67'
PR	17	Moray Low	(substituted on) 75'
LK	18	Nathan Hines	(substituted on) 57'
FL	19	Kelly Brown	(substituted on) 41'
SH	20	Chris Cusiter	(substituted on) 68'
CE	21	Nick De Luca	(substituted on) 44'
FB	22	Hugo Southwell	(substituted on) 75'
Coach:
Frank Hadden

Notes:

- England won the 121st Calcutta Cup.

21 March 2009
17:30 GMT

Wales	15–17	Ireland
Pen: S. Jones (4/5) 33', 39', 51', 56'; Drop: S. Jones (1/1) 76'	Report	Try: O'Driscoll 44' c Bowe 46' c Con: O'Gara (2/2); Drop: O'Gara (1/1) 78'

Millennium Stadium, Cardiff
Attendance: 74,625
Referee: Wayne Barnes (England)

FB	15	Lee Byrne	(substituted off) 30'
RW	14	Mark Jones
OC	13	Tom Shanklin
IC	12	Gavin Henson
LW	11	Shane Williams
FH	10	Stephen Jones
SH	9	Mike Phillips
N8	8	Ryan Jones (c)
OF	7	Martyn Williams
BF	6	Dafydd Jones
RL	5	Alun Wyn Jones
LL	4	Ian Gough	(substituted off) 55'
TP	3	Adam Jones
HK	2	Matthew Rees	(substituted off) 55'
LP	1	Gethin Jenkins
Replacements:
HK	16	Huw Bennett	(substituted on) 55'
PR	17	John Yapp
LK	18	Luke Charteris	(substituted on) 55'
FL	19	Jonathan Thomas
SH	20	Warren Fury
FH	21	James Hook
CE	22	Jamie Roberts	(substituted on) 30'
Coach:
Warren Gatland

FB	15	Rob Kearney	(substituted off) 66'
RW	14	Tommy Bowe
OC	13	Brian O'Driscoll (c)
IC	12	Gordon D'Arcy
LW	11	Luke Fitzgerald	(substituted off) 76'
FH	10	Ronan O'Gara
SH	9	Tomás O'Leary	(substituted off) 69'
N8	8	Jamie Heaslip
OF	7	David Wallace
BF	6	Stephen Ferris	(substituted off) 7'
RL	5	Paul O'Connell
LL	4	Donncha O'Callaghan
TP	3	John Hayes	(substituted off) 23'	(substituted on) 27'
HK	2	Jerry Flannery	(substituted off) 68'
LP	1	Marcus Horan
Replacements:
HK	16	Rory Best	(substituted on) 68'
PR	17	Tom Court	(substituted on) 23'	(substituted off) 27'
LK	18	Mick O'Driscoll
FL	19	Denis Leamy	(substituted on) 7'
SH	20	Peter Stringer	(substituted on) 69'
CE	21	Paddy Wallace	(substituted on) 76'
FB	22	Geordan Murphy	(substituted on) 66'
Coach:
Declan Kidney

Notes:

- Ireland claimed their first championship since 1985 and first Grand Slam since 1948.

== Scorers ==
Try scorers
Tries	Name	Pld	Team
4	Brian O'Driscoll	5	Ireland
4	Riki Flutey	5	England
3	Delon Armitage	5	England
3	Maxime Médard	5	France
2	Julien Malzieu	3	France
2	Leigh Halfpenny	3	Wales
2	Shane Williams	4	Wales
2	Mark Cueto	5	England
2	Harry Ellis	5	England
2	Cédric Heymans	5	France
2	Tommy Bowe	5	Ireland
2	Luke Fitzgerald	5	Ireland
2	Jamie Heaslip	5	Ireland
2	Tom Shanklin	5	Wales

Point scorers
Points	Name	Pld	Team
51	Ronan O'Gara	5	Ireland
46	Chris Paterson	5	Scotland
44	Stephen Jones	5	Wales
28	Lionel Beauxis	2	France
26	Morgan Parra	5	France
23	Brian O'Driscoll	5	Ireland
22	Toby Flood	5	England
21	Andy Goode	5	England
20	Riki Flutey	5	England
18	Andrea Marcato	3	Italy
18	Luke McLean	3	Italy
18	Delon Armitage	5	England
