= Jamie Roberts =

Welsh rugby union player (born 1986)

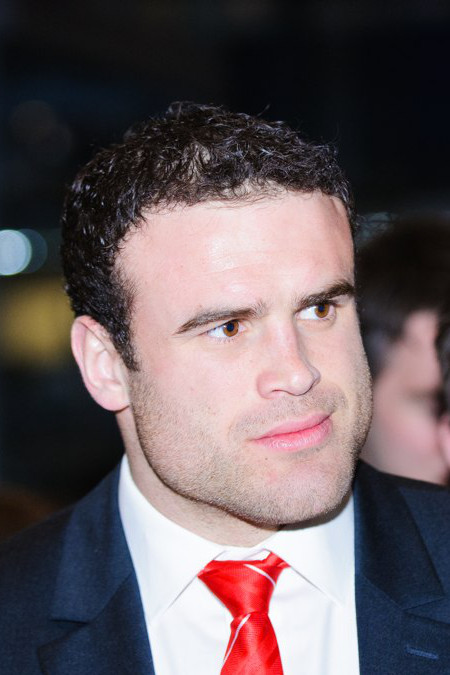
- Born: Jamie Huw Roberts; 8 November 1986 (age 40) Newport, Wales
- Height: 1.96 m (6 ft 5 in)
- Weight: 107 kg (16 st 12 lb; 236 lb)
- School: Ysgol Gyfun Gymraeg Glantaf; Ysgol Y Wern
- University: Cardiff University; University of Cambridge

Rugby union career
- Position(s): Centre, Fullback, Wing
Senior career
Years	Team	Apps	(Points)
2005–2007	Cardiff RFC	28	(75)
2007–2013	Cardiff Blues	87	(90)
2013–2015	Racing Métro	31	(20)
2015	Cambridge University	5	(10)
2015–2018	Harlequins	45	(45)
2018–2020	Bath	19	(15)
2020	Stormers	6	(0)
2020–2021	Dragons	14	(20)
2022	New South Wales Waratahs	11	(0)
International career
Years	Team	Apps	(Points)
2008–2017	Wales	94	(60)
2009–2013	British & Irish Lions	3	(5)

Jamie Huw Roberts (born 8 November 1986) is a Welsh former professional rugby union player who played as a centre.

Beginning in 2005, Roberts played for Cardiff RFC, Cardiff Blues, Racing Métro, Cambridge University, Harlequins, Bath, the Stormers, the Dragons and the Waratahs. He won 94 caps for Wales between 2008 and 2017 and three for the British & Irish Lions on their tours to South Africa in 2009 and Australia in 2013.

Roberts qualified as a medical doctor in parallel with his rugby career, and since his retirement from professional rugby in 2022 he has started practising as a physician.

== Rugby career ==
=== Early career ===
Roberts represented Wales at all levels between Under-16 and Under-21. He was part of the Under-21 team that won the Six Nations Grand Slam in 2005. During the 2005–06 season, he represented Cardiff RFC. He played 11 times and scored five tries. In the 2006–07 season, he sustained a shoulder injury but recovered to play 17 times and score 10 tries for his amateur club.

=== 2007–2008 ===
==== Cardiff Blues ====
With players away at the 2007 Rugby World Cup, Roberts was called up to play for the Cardiff Blues, making his debut against the Ospreys; the Blues won 17–15. He then scored a try against the Dragons and two against Glasgow Warriors. This form led to continued selection for the Blues and led to selection in the Wales squad for the Six Nations.

==== 2008 Six Nations ====
Roberts made his debut against Scotland in the second match of the championship, starting on the wing as Wales won 30–15.

Roberts was left out for the next match against Italy, with Mark Jones beating him to the number 14 jersey. Jones remained in that position for the rest of the tournament. Wales won their second Grand Slam in four years.

==== 2008 tour of South Africa ====
Roberts was included in the squad for the summer tour test series in South Africa. Due to an injury to Lee Byrne, Roberts started the match at full back. Despite Wales putting in a disappointing display, Roberts scored his first test try. He was replaced by Morgan Stoddart, and Wales lost the match 43–17. Roberts was again selected the following week, but as inside centre. He had never played in that position before. Wales lost 37–21, with two infringements by Roberts leading to points for South Africa. Wales lost the series 2–0, but Roberts stayed in this position throughout his career.

=== 2008–2009 ===
==== 2008 Autumn Tests ====
After the game against South Africa, Blues coach Dai Young gave Roberts a chance in the position and he was named in the Wales squad for the Autumn internationals. For the first match against the South Africa, Roberts was selected at outside centre, a fourth position for Wales in as many tests. He was moved to inside centre as Gavin Henson pulled out with an injury and Tom Shanklin moved to outside centre. Wales lost the game 20–15. Roberts was then named on the bench for the match against Canada. Wales won 34–13 with Roberts appearing as substitute. Roberts then returned for the match with New Zealand. Wales lost the game 29–9. He was once again selected at inside centre for the match against Australia, but Roberts collided with Australian captain Stirling Mortlock in the second minute. Mortlock was immediately replaced but Roberts initially played on and was crucial in the build-up to Shane Williams' opening Wales try. He was later replaced by Andrew Bishop in the 18th minute. Wales finally claimed a victory over a southern hemisphere team, winning 21–18. Roberts had a fractured skull and was out for two months.

==== 2009 Six Nations ====
Roberts returned to the Blues setup two months later and played in the 14-man Blues victory away to Gloucester which saw the Blues become the fifth team to win all their games in the Heineken Cup group stage. Roberts was then selected in the Wales squad for the 2009 Six Nations. In the opening match against Scotland, Roberts won a man of the match award in the 26–13 win. He was again selected for the match against England, which Wales won 23–15. Roberts played again at 12 for the game against France. This time he was kept quiet and was replaced midway through the second half by Gavin Henson. Wales lost 21–15. Roberts was selected at outside centre with Gavin Henson against Italy. Wales won 20–15 but not by the amount they were hoping for, as they were looking to increase their points difference for the final round. Roberts was put on the bench for the tournament decider against Ireland. He came on just before half-time as Lee Byrne was injured. Roberts failed to match Brian O'Driscoll, who scored a try, as Ireland claimed victory 17–15 to win the Grand Slam for the first time in 61 years.

==== End-of-season form ====
Despite the disappointing end to the Six Nations, Roberts continued to play well for the Blues as they won the EDF Energy Cup with a 50–12 win over Gloucester. On 21 April 2009, Roberts was named as a member of the British & Irish Lions for the 2009 tour to South Africa. He was one of six Blues selected.

The Blues also made it into the Heineken Cup semi-finals thanks to a win over Toulouse. But they lost in a penalty shoot-out against Leicester Tigers after the match was drawn 26–26. Roberts scored a try and set up another try.

==== 2009 Lions Tour of South Africa ====
===== Warm-up matches =====
Before the tour, Roberts was in contention for the inside centre role. Roberts was selected to play in the opening match of the tour, against the Royal XV. He was partnered by Keith Earls in the centre. Despite a dour display from the Lions, Roberts held his own in the altitude and along with Lee Byrne and Tommy Bowe made an early claim for the test spot in the 37–25 win. In the same game, Flutey came on but picked up an injury ruling him out for a week and a half. This meant that Roberts was selected once again for the match against the Golden Lions, this time partnered with Brian O'Driscoll. He scored two tries and made several breaks as the Lions won 74–10. He was then left out of the next game against the Free State Cheetahs, as the Lions scraped victory 26–24. Roberts was once again selected in the centre with O'Driscoll for the next match against the Sharks. There were also signs of concerns as he hurt his shoulder and had to have it strapped. Coach Ian McGeechan played down any injury worries, saying that it was just bruising. The Lions won 39–3. Riki Flutey was then given his first start against Western Province, but failed to impress.

===== First test =====
Roberts was named in the centre with O'Driscoll for the first test match in Durban. The Lions lost narrowly 26–21, despite a late comeback and their outscoring the opposition by three tries to two. In the game Roberts offloaded to O'Driscoll to set up the first try for Tom Croft. He made a tandem tackle with O'Driscoll on winger JP Pietersen, knocking him back 20 metres (66 ft). His partnership with O'Driscoll was touted as one of the Lions' best centre combinations ever.

===== Second test =====
Roberts was selected again with O'Driscoll in the centre for the match at Loftus Versfeld. This was significant for Roberts because it was where he had played his first test in the centre (and also his first ever match at centre). He had a quieter game and never missed a tackle. But it wasn't enough for the Lions as they went down 28–25 to last minute Morné Steyn penalty from 53 metres (174 ft) out. This gave the Springboks an unassailable 2–0 lead in the series, to give them revenge for the 1997 defeat that the Boks had suffered to the Lions. They also outscored the Lions three tries to one with JP Pietersen, Bryan Habana and Jacque Fourie all scoring. Rob Kearney scored the Lions try. Roberts was taken off in 69th minute due to a sprained wrist and replaced by Ronan O'Gara. This proved costly as O'Gara missed a tackle which led to Fourie's try and conceded the penalty which Steyn kicked. Roberts wasn't the only one to pick up an injury. Props Gethin Jenkins (broken cheekbone), Adam Jones (dislocated shoulder) and centre partner Brian O'Driscoll (concussion) all picking up injuries. This led to uncontested scrums, which favoured the Springboks. This is what many believed to be the difference.

This next day, coach Ian McGeechan announced that both props Jenkins and Jones would miss the final test and Roberts and O'Driscoll were major doubts. The following Monday, it was announced that O'Driscoll would be flying home but Roberts along with Tommy Bowe, would most likely play in the final test. But when the team was announced, Roberts' place was taken by Riki Flutey with Tommy Bowe in the outside centre. The Lions would go on to win 28–9 in the final test against a new look Springbok team, but the series was still lost 2–1. Roberts was selected as the Lions Player of the Series.

=== 2009–2010 ===
==== September – October (Magners League & Heineken Cup) ====
After the Lions tour, Roberts, along with all the other Lions would be given a five-week break from the sport. Dafydd James said that it was a good thing. This came from his personal experience from being injured after being rushed back into rugby from the tour. Roberts would return to regional training with the Blues in late September or early October. And despite having become a well-known figure on the Lions tour, Roberts would also face stiff competition for a centre spot from new signings Casey Laulala and Gavin Evans alongside Dafydd Hewitt, who was returning from a long-term injury. The Blues lost their opening two matches to Edinburgh and Munster, with Roberts being rested. He then returned for the match with Connacht but played the first half, with an ankle injury forcing him off. The Blues lost 18–16. The following Monday, Roberts was cleared to play in the game against the Scarlets in the first Welsh derby of the season. But he was once again forced off before halftime, this time with a neck injury. The Blues claimed their first victory of the season 19–15. Roberts would be ruled out for ten days with the neck injury, meaning he missed the game against Glasgow Warriors, which the Blues lost 21–5. Having lost four of the five games going into the Heineken Cup opener against Harlequins, Roberts returned to partner Tom Shanklin in the centre. The Blues claimed a 20–6 victory. Roberts set up the opening try for Tom James, and also made a 70-metre (230 ft) kick before halftime. The Blues then took on the Sale Sharks the following week. They lost 27–26 in a close game. They played the Ospreys next, with the largest attendance at their new stadium. Roberts and Tom Shanklin were very good in defence. The Wales squad was named the next day, with Roberts included.

==== 2009 Autumn Internationals ====
For the first game against New Zealand, despite speculation he would be playing at 13, outside James Hook, he was retained at 12, partnering Tom Shanklin in the centre with Hook playing at full-back. Wales lost 19–12. The centre partnership with Shanklin lacked creativity, meaning Roberts was expected to move 13 with Hook coming in at 12. For the game against Samoa, the partnership was retained with Hook remaining at full-back. Roberts had a quiet game and Samoa nearly repeated the shock victories of the 1991 and 1999 Rugby World Cups, but Wales held out for a 17–13 victory. Tom Shanklin was replaced by Jonathan Davies. This was seen as the probable partnership for the game against Argentina although some were calling for James Hook to come in at 12 after making several breaks. On the Monday before the match, it was revealed that Tom Shanklin had broken his nose and would therefore miss the game against the Pumas. With Gatland keen to keep Hook at full back, Jonathan Davies was brought in, incidentally at 12, with Roberts shifting to outside centre for the second time in the red jersey. Wales claimed victory by 33–16. Roberts was then named in the Barbarians squad along with two other Cardiff Blues players Andy Powell and Leigh Halfpenny. He was put under the spotlight in the final match of the series against Australia. Once again Roberts was selected at 13 with Davies at 12, despite Shanklin returning from injury. Roberts was the only player to make any headway as Wales were crushed 33–12 in their worst performance in Warren Gatland's reign. Roberts was then given a start for the Barbarians match against the All Blacks, with Jaque Fourie partnering him in the centre. It would be seen as a chance to redeem himself after a disappointing international series. Roberts was finally given the chance to prove his worth with an instrumental performance as the Barbarians claimed only their second ever victory over New Zealand, winning 25–18. This proved the critics that he wasn't lacking form but that Wales needed someone to give the opportunity to shine.

==== December – January (Magners League & Heineken Cup) ====
Roberts was selected for the Heineken Cup match against Toulouse in Cardiff. The Blues won 15–9 in a lacklustre match. In another lacklustre match, Toulouse claimed a 23–7 win, a blow to the Blues' quarter final hopes. He then played in the 42–13 win over rivals the Dragons. He also picked up a shoulder injury in this match and would miss the second derby match against the Ospreys. The understrength Blues were hammered 26–0. On 5 January 2010, Roberts signed a new contract with the Blues that would keep him at the region until at least 2013. After playing well in Blues 36–19 win over Sale Sharks, the Blues faced the probability of being knocked out of the Heineken Cup. And if they did not get a result against Harlequins, they would be knocked out of Europe altogether, and not be included in the European Challenge Cup. Roberts was also facing competition for his Welsh jersey, with James Hook and Andrew Bishop forming an excellent centre partnership at the Ospreys. But the Blues ended their Heineken Cup on a high note by beating Harlequins, 45–20, with Roberts hitting back at the critics with two tries, his first of the season. And although they were knocked out of the Heineken Cup, they did qualify for the Challenge Cup, by finishing second in their group.

==== 2010 Six Nations ====
Roberts and James Hook were selected in the centres to play against England, with Roberts returning to his natural position of 12, having played two games at his less favoured position of 13 in the autumn. Roberts and Hook combined well, and Hook scored a superb individual try but they did not get enough of the ball as Wales lost 30–17, despite a strong fight back. They were again paired together for the match against Scotland. Roberts had an excellent game making several breaks. Wales were not as impressive but completed a comeback to defeat the Scots 31–24, having been 24–14 down with five minutes to go. The backline for Wales was retained in the following match against France, the second ever Friday night Six Nations match. Roberts and Hook managed to combine very well throughout the match but could not capitalise on their opportunities. France ended up winning 26–20 despite an excellent Welsh comeback, after scoring two interception tries in the first half to go up 20–0. Roberts played again against Ireland against Brian O'Driscoll, the man he partnered in the centre for the Lions. Ireland claimed a convincing victory 27–12. Once again, Roberts and Hook played in the centres in the final match against Italy. Wales won 33–10 with the pair combining well as Hook scored two tries. Gatland said after the match, that despite the two playing well, it would take possibly up to 12 months for them to become a great centre partnership.

==== April – May (Magners League & Amlin Challenge Cup) ====
Roberts returned to the Blues a couple weeks after the Six Nations in their 19–9 win over Ulster. The Blues then won against Newcastle Falcons in the Amlin Challenge Cup 55–20, with Roberts claiming a try. He then produced a man of the match display against the Scarlets in the Magners League, scoring two tries and setting up another in a comfortable 39–16 win over the west Wales region. This ended the Scarlets' hopes of a spot in the Heineken Cup. Roberts then played in the 20–14 win over the Dragons at Rodney Parade. Next came London Wasps in the Amlin Challenge Cup semi final. The Blues claimed victory to move into the final against Toulon on 23 May. But before this, he played in the 13–12 victory over Munster, scoring a try. Next came the Amlin Final. The Blues claimed a victory by 28 points to 21, becoming the first Welsh team to win silverware in Europe. Roberts scored a try.

==== 2010 June Tests (Prince William Cup & Tour of New Zealand) ====
Roberts was selected for the Welsh squad to go on tour to New Zealand and to take on South Africa on 5 June. Hook partnered Roberts for the sixth time in a row as Wales lost 31–34 to South Africa. Roberts had a great game combining excellently with Hook, getting over gainline a lot and putting in some decent tackles. This was not enough as Wales were outmuscled at the breakdown. Roberts was then partnered with Andrew Bishop in the centre for the first test against the All Blacks. Roberts was once again in defence, and made some breaks but it was again in vain as Wales were outmuscled by New Zealand going down 42–9 in the final ever test in Carisbrook. Roberts was taken off in the 69th minute with a shoulder injury but was deemed fine to play in the next test. His centre partner Bishop however picked up a hand injury, ruling him out of the next test. He was replaced by Jonathan Davies who played in the number 13 jersey. Wales lost the second test 29–10 but put in a slightly improved display. Roberts had another decent game once again putting in brutal tackles, making loads of tackle busts and breaks and got his 2nd test try as reward, Wales' first test try since 2006 against the All Blacks. He could have had another one but was held up over the line.

=== 2010–2011 ===
==== Wrist surgery ====
Coming back from the tour of New Zealand, Roberts required wrist surgery. It was an injury that he had picked up on the 2009 Lions Tour in the second test and had been an ongoing problem. The surgery would rule him out until Christmas. Roberts though was positive about the surgery saying it would give him time to recuperate before the 2011 Rugby World Cup. He later stated that he hoped to knock the return date down by a month or two. On 6 December, Roberts was cleared to play in the Heineken Cup matches against Northampton Saints, a few weeks earlier than expected. Roberts tweeted, "Just had my appointment with the wrist surgeon. I walked out feeling like a kid at Christmas. Return to the playing field imminent."

==== 2011 Six Nations ====
Roberts returned for the Blues and was subsequently called up to the Six Nations squad. He was named at number 13 with Jonathan Davies at number 12 for the first game against England. He had a very quiet game only touching the ball 5 times. Wales lost 19–26 in a gripping encounter. He was retained for the game against Scotland with instructions to look for the ball against the Scots as Wales claimed a 24–6 victory. Davies was then ruled of the next match against Italy, so James Hook was moved to 13 and Roberts to 12. He had the same effect making some neat runs and some brutal hits, notably on Sergio Parisse, the Italian captain. Wales claimed victory 24–16. Davies then returned for the match against Ireland, with Roberts going back to 13. Wales claimed victory by 19 to 13, after a controversial try by Mike Phillips. The win kept Wales' championship hopes alive going into their final game against France. He was once again selected in a retained centre pairing but Wales were crushed by France 28–9, to end championship hopes and finish fourth.

=== 2011–2012 ===
==== 2011 Rugby World Cup warm-ups ====
Roberts was named in the preliminary 45-man World Cup squad which would attend to training camps in Spała, Poland. Roberts was then named in the starting line-up for Wales' opening World Cup warm-up match against England at Twickenham, partnering Jonathan Davies in the centre to win his 30th Welsh cap. A Welsh team lost 23–19 to England with Roberts having a strong game. Roberts was then selected for the return fixture against England. He once again had a strong game running and tackling but picked up a yellow card for repeated ruck infringements. Wales claimed a 19–9 win - a huge confidence boost for the world cup. Roberts then started against Argentina, the final warm-up game which Wales won comfortably 28–13. The following Monday he was included in the Welsh squad to travel to New Zealand for the 2011 Rugby World Cup.

==== 2011 Rugby World Cup ====
Roberts was selected at 12 for the opening match of the Rugby World Cup against South Africa which was lost 17–16. He was selected at 12 again, in an unchanged XV for the game against Samoa which Wales won 17–10. Roberts was not selected for the match with Namibia. But he returned for the match against Fiji, where he scored two tries, in a 66–0 win against the Pacific Island team. Wales would then face Ireland in the first quarter final with Roberts face up to old Lions centre partner Brian O'Driscoll. Wales won 22–10 to move into the semi-finals for the first time since 1987. Wales would then lose their respective semi-final 9–8 to France after skipper Sam Warburton was red carded in the 18th minute for a tip tackle. Roberts had a superb game however, carrying hard throughout. Wales finished the tournament with a 21–18 loss in the third place play-off against Australia. Roberts was hailed for his performances in the tournament as one of Wales' best players.

==== 2012 Six Nations ====
Roberts was named in the Wales squad for the 2012 Six Nations Championship, starting all five games as Wales achieved their third Grand Slam in eight years. Roberts played all five games at inside centre and, apart from missing most of the second half of the match versus England, played every minute of the Welsh campaign. Roberts scored one try in Wales' 24–3 defeat of Italy.

=== 2012–2013 ===
==== 2012 Autumn Internationals ====
Although Wales lost all four of their matches in the 2012 Autumn internationals, against Argentina, Australia, New Zealand and Samoa, Roberts was a stand-out performer, playing three games in his usual inside centre position.

==== 2013 Six Nations ====
Wales were crowned 2013 Six Nations champions despite losing 30–22 at home to Ireland in the opening game. Roberts was central to this success, starting all five games, including a famous 30–3 win over England at the Millennium Stadium in the final game, denying England a Grand Slam in the process.

==== 2013 British & Irish Lions tour to Australia ====
Roberts was selected for 2013 Lions tour down under and started in the decisive third and final test at the ANZ Stadium in Sydney, where he scored the final try in a 41–16 victory.

==== Final season at Cardiff Blues ====
Roberts played 12 games and scored two tries in his final season at Cardiff Blues, a record restricted by international demands and injury.

=== 2013–2014 ===
==== Racing Métro ====
In July 2013, he signed for Racing Métro (now known as Racing 92) in the French Top 14. Roberts played 16 games and scored once during his first season at the Parisian club, his appearances were restricted by an injury which also caused him to miss the 2013 Autumn series.

==== 2014 Six Nations ====
Wales won three games during the 2014 Six Nations Championship with Roberts starting all five games. Wales victories included a 51–3 win over Scotland, in which Roberts scored two tries, and a convincing 27–6 victory over France.

Roberts also played two summer tests for Wales against South Africa, scoring a try in the 31–30 loss in the second test in Nelspruit.

=== 2014–2015 ===
Roberts started all four games of Wales's 2014 Autumn campaign, including the victories over Fiji and South Africa, earning many plaudits in the process for his strong performances.

He played in all five of Wales's 2015 Six Nations games and scored one try.

=== 2015–2016 ===
==== 2015 Rugby World Cup ====
Roberts played four games for Wales in the 2015 Rugby World Cup

==== Cambridge University ====
After the 2015 Rugby World Cup, Roberts began a Master of Philosophy in medical science at the University of Cambridge. This entitled him to play rugby for Cambridge and he was selected for The Varsity Match which took place in London on 10 December 2015. Roberts was forced out of the game at half-time in a match Cambridge lost.

==== Harlequins ====
On 18 May 2015, Roberts signed for English Premiership side Harlequins. This contract was rumoured to make him one of the highest paid players in the world, receiving £380,000 a year. Roberts' first game for Harlequins was against Calvisano on 19 December, in which he scored a try.

==== Wales tour of Tonga and Samoa ====
Roberts was named as captain for Wales' summer tour to Tonga and Samoa.

=== Bath ===
In March 2018, it was confirmed that Roberts had signed for Bath from the end of the 2017–18 Premiership season.

=== Stormers ===
Roberts joined Stormers in Super Rugby on 16 January 2020.

=== Dragons ===
On 3 August 2020, Roberts returned to Wales, signing for the Dragons on a one-year contract.

== Post-rugby career ==
Roberts is a qualified doctor. After attending Ysgol Gyfun Gymraeg Glantaf, he studied at Cardiff University School of Medicine while playing rugby, graduating in 2013. While continuing his rugby career, Roberts completed postgraduate degrees at Loughborough University, where he was awarded a Master of Business Administration in 2021, and at Cambridge University, where he earned a Master of Philosophy in medical science at Queens' College in 2017. He started the Foundation Programme in 2025, working as a resident doctor in South Wales.

== Professional record ==
Statistics as of 9 January 2018:

=== Overall professional points record ===
Team	Appearances	Tries	Conversions	Penalties	Drop goals	Total points
Bath	19	3	0	0	0	15
Harlequins	45	9	0	0	0	45
Racing Métro	31	4	0	0	0	20
Cardiff Blues	87	15	0	0	0	75
Wales	91	12	0	0	0	60
British & Irish Lions	3	1	0	0	0	5
British & Irish Lions tour matches	6	3	0	0	0	15
Barbarians	1	0	0	0	0	0

== Awards ==
- 2007–08 Cardiff Blues Most Promising Player
- 2009 British & Irish Lions Player of The Series
- 2009 BBC Wales Sports Personality Award Third Place

== Honours ==
Wales

- Six Nations: 2008, 2012, 2013
  - Grand Slam: 2008, 2012
  - Triple Crown: 2008, 2012

Cardiff Blues

- Anglo-Welsh Cup: 2008–09
- European Challenge Cup: 2009–10

== Personal life ==
Roberts and his wife Nicole had their first child in 2021.

Roberts is a fluent Welsh speaker. He is a patron for the anti-smoking pressure group and charity ASH Wales.

Awards
Preceded by Bradley Davies	Cardiff Blues Most Promising Player; 2007–08	Succeeded by Tom James
New title	British & Irish Lions Player of The Series; 2009	Succeeded by Leigh Halfpenny
