= Luke McLean =

Italy international rugby union player

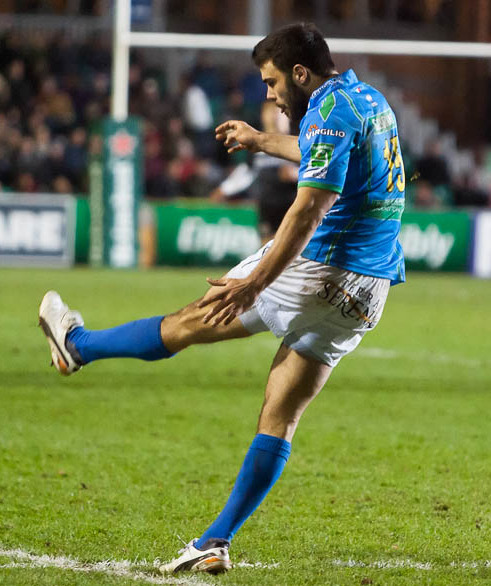
- Born: Luke McLean; 29 June 1987 (age 39) Townsville, Australia
- Height: 1.90 m (6 ft 3 in)
- Weight: 95 kg (209 lb; 14 st 13 lb)

Rugby union career
- Position(s): Fullback, Wing, Fly-half
- Current team: London Irish
Senior career
Years	Team	Apps	(Points)
2007	Perth Spirit	4	(16)
2007–2009	Calvisano	39	(80)
2009–2014	Benetton Treviso	81	(71)
2014–2015	Sale Sharks	11	(10)
2015−2017	Benetton Treviso	34	(10)
2017−2019	London Irish	29	(15)
- Correct as of 13 December 2018
International career
Years	Team	Apps	(Points)
2008–2019	Italy	89	(74)
- Correct as of 18 March 2017

Luke McLean (born 29 June 1987) is a former professional rugby union footballer who played as a fullback. Born in Australia to an Italian mother, he won 89 caps for the Italy national team.

== Personal life ==
McLean was born in Townsville, Queensland.

His mother's parents are both Italian; however, his grandfather had to give up his Italian citizenship to buy land in Australia.

McLean attended St. Laurence's College, in South Brisbane, during his schooling years. He was College captain in 2004.

== Career ==
=== Club career ===
McLean played for Perth Spirit in the Australian Rugby Championship before joining Italian team Calvisano in 2007, turning down a training contract with Western Force. McLean joined Benetton Treviso in 2009 where he played over 80 games. In mid 2014 he signed with the Sale Sharks on a two-year deal. McLean would then return to Benetton Treviso in Italy from the 2015–16 season.

On 2 June 2017 it was announced he had signed for London Irish in the English Premiership. He retired at the conclusion of the 2018–19 season.

=== International career ===
McLean was eligible for both Australia, being his country of birth, and Italy, due to his Italian grandmother. He represented the Australia under-19 side, helping the side to win the World under-19 championships. He made his international debut for Italy against 2007 Rugby World Cup winners South Africa on 21 June 2008 in Cape Town. Italy were defeated 26–0.

McLean scored his first international points on his Six Nations debut in the 36–11 defeat to England at Twickenham on 7 February 2009. He scored two penalties in the first-half. He then played against Ireland on 15 February, scoring all of Italy's nine points, converting three penalties in the 38–9 defeat at Stadio Flaminio, Rome. McLean scored a further three points kicking a penalty in the 26–6 defeat to Scotland at Murrayfield on 28 February. He featured in Italy's 20–15 loss to Wales on 15 March 2008 at Stadio Flaminio, failing to score any of Italy's points. McLean played in Italy's last Six Nations 2009 match against France on 21 March, losing 50–8.

McLean played a part in Italy's two match series on tour against Australia and New Zealand in 2009, scoring the majority of Italy's points. He scored a try against England in the 2013 Six Nations Championship.

In 2017, McLean played in all of Italy's 6 Nations matches and took on the role as one of the team's primary play-makers, playing at inside centre.
