= Franco Sbaraglini =

- Born: Franco Sbaraglini; 3 December 1982 (age 43) Mar del Plata, Argentina
- Height: 1.80 m (5 ft 11 in)
- Weight: 105 kg (231 lb; 16.5 st)

Rugby union career
- Position: Hooker
Senior career
Years	Team	Apps	(Points)
2003–2014	Benetton Treviso	149	(20)
International career
Years	Team	Apps	(Points)
2009–2010	Italy	5	(0)
- Correct as of 19 November 2011

Franco Sbaraglini (born 3 December 1982) is a former Italian Argentine rugby union player. His preferred position was at Hooker, although he could also play as a Prop. He played his entire career for Benetton Treviso in the Pro12 competition and the European Heineken Cup. During the 2009 Six Nations Championship Sbaraglini was called up to the Italian national rugby team for the first time. He had previously represented Italy A. He made his debut on 28 February 2009 against Scotland at Murrayfield coming on as a replacement, playing 22 minutes. He was an unused substitute against Wales and France. He retired in 2015. He now owns a restaurant in his native Tucumán in Argentina.
