= Harry Ellis =

English rugby union footballer

- Born: Harry Alistair Ellis; 17 May 1982 (age 44) Wigston, Leicestershire, England
- Height: 5 ft 11 in (1.80 m)
- Weight: 13 st 8 lb (100 kg)
- School: Leicester Grammar School
- University: De Montfort University

Rugby union career
- Position: Scrum-half
- Current team: Oadby Wyggs
Senior career
| Years | Team | Apps | (Points) |
| 2001–2010 | Leicester Tigers | 173 | (145) |
- Correct as of 8 July 2010
International career
| Years | Team | Apps | (Points) |
| 2004–2009 | England | 27 | (25) |
| 2009 | British & Irish Lions | 1 | (0) |
- Correct as of 8 July 2010

Harry Alistair Ellis (born 17 May 1982) is an English former rugby union footballer who played scrum half for Leicester Tigers, England and the British & Irish Lions.

In July 2010, Ellis announced his retirement from the game as a result of a persistent knee injury. He now works at his former school, Leicester Grammar School, teaching PE to A-Level and GCSE students, and contributing to the coaching of its 1st XV and other sporting teams.

== Club career ==
Ellis first played rugby union as a 6-year-old with the South Leicester club. He studied at Bushloe High School and later Leicester Grammar School, where he represented Leicester Schools and the Midlands at every age level. He also became a teacher for a short period of time.

He spent a year with the Wigston club South Leicester RUFC before he finally joined the Leicester Tigers Academy where he combined playing with further education at De Montfort University. He worked his way through the Tigers lower teams and continued his representative career, playing for both the England U19 and U21 sides. He has also featured in the England Sevens squad along with his teammate Louis Deacon.

In August 2001, he made his first team Tigers debut in the Orange Cup game in Toulouse. In Leicester's 2002 Heineken Cup quarter final, Ellis scored the only try of the game, breaking away from a ruck and sliding over on the wet ground. Ellis went on to score a superb individual try that helped defeat Llanelli in the Heineken Cup semi-final at Nottingham. In the final itself Ellis came on as a replacement as Leicester emerged victorious. He was named Tigers' Players Young Player of the Year for the 2001–2 season.

He finally established himself as a regular in the No. 9 spot during the 2003–04 season, making 19 appearances and helping Tigers come back from a poor start and a turbulent mid-season to reach the Zurich Wild Card final.

Ellis suffered knee ligament damage against Bristol on 5 May 2007 in the Guinness Premiership semi-final play-off. He played an influential role in the Tigers' domestic double success, but the injury meant him missing out on the Premiership and Heineken Cup finals.

The Heineken Cup semi-final against Cardiff Blues resulted in a historic sudden death kicking competition. The shoot-out ended before Ellis's turn came up – though it was a close run thing, as either he or Tom Croft were to follow Jordan Crane. Although the Tigers fell at the final hurdle of the Heineken Cup, they won the 2008–09 Guinness Premiership final, which Ellis did not feature in but was an unused replacement.

Ellis started the 2009/10 season as first-choice scrum-half for Leicester, but suffered an injury in training, which left him out of the game for a significant part of the season. He returned to play in the Guinness A league, and helped the Tigers A team to victory.

His last game for the senior side came against Northampton Saints in the LV= Cup.

== International career ==
Ellis played for the England A, Under 16 Group and Under 18 Group schools sides. In fact, he played for the England Under 18 side when he was only 16.

Ellis was selected on England's 2004 summer tour as third choice scrum half behind Matt Dawson and Andy Gomarsall and did not play, however he made his England debut from the bench in their 32–16 win over the Springboks in autumn 2004. He also made an appearance as a replacement in the game against Australia.

He subsequently became a regular fixture in the England side, rotating with Matt Dawson during the 2005 Six Nations. Ellis scored his debut try for England in the 2005 Calcutta Cup win over Scotland. He lost out to Matt Dawson for the opening two Autumn tests in 2005 but took his chance superbly against Samoa, scoring an outstanding solo try in what was comfortably his best test match performance. This helped secured him the no 9 shirt for four games of the 2006 Six Nations.

He was left out of the Summer development tour to Australia, but was chosen again for the Elite Player England Squad for the 2006/2007 season. Ellis was not included in the 2006 Autumn internationals that saw England head coach Andy Robinson lose his job, but when Brian Ashton was appointed as his successor Ellis was named in the team to start England's 2007 Six Nations opener against Scotland. In this game Ellis came of age and it was arguably one of his best performances in an England shirt. He consistently retained his place throughout the 2007 Six Nations, starting in every game and scoring a try in the loss to Wales.

Ellis was ruled out of the 2007 Rugby World Cup due to the knee injury suffered in the Premiership.

He had a very successful 2009 Six Nations tournament, starting for England as a result of the ankle injury to Danny Care, and went on to score two tries in a man-of-the-match performance against Italy, where his opposite number was, unusually, Mauro Bergamasco. He started all subsequent Six Nations matches, where he played scrum-half to former teammate Andy Goode, and then current teammate Toby Flood's fly-half. His last game for England came in the Calcutta Cup win over Scotland.

He was picked for the 2009 British & Irish Lions tour, where he played as a substitute in the final Test win against the Springboks in Ellis Park.
