= Delon Armitage =

English rugby union footballer

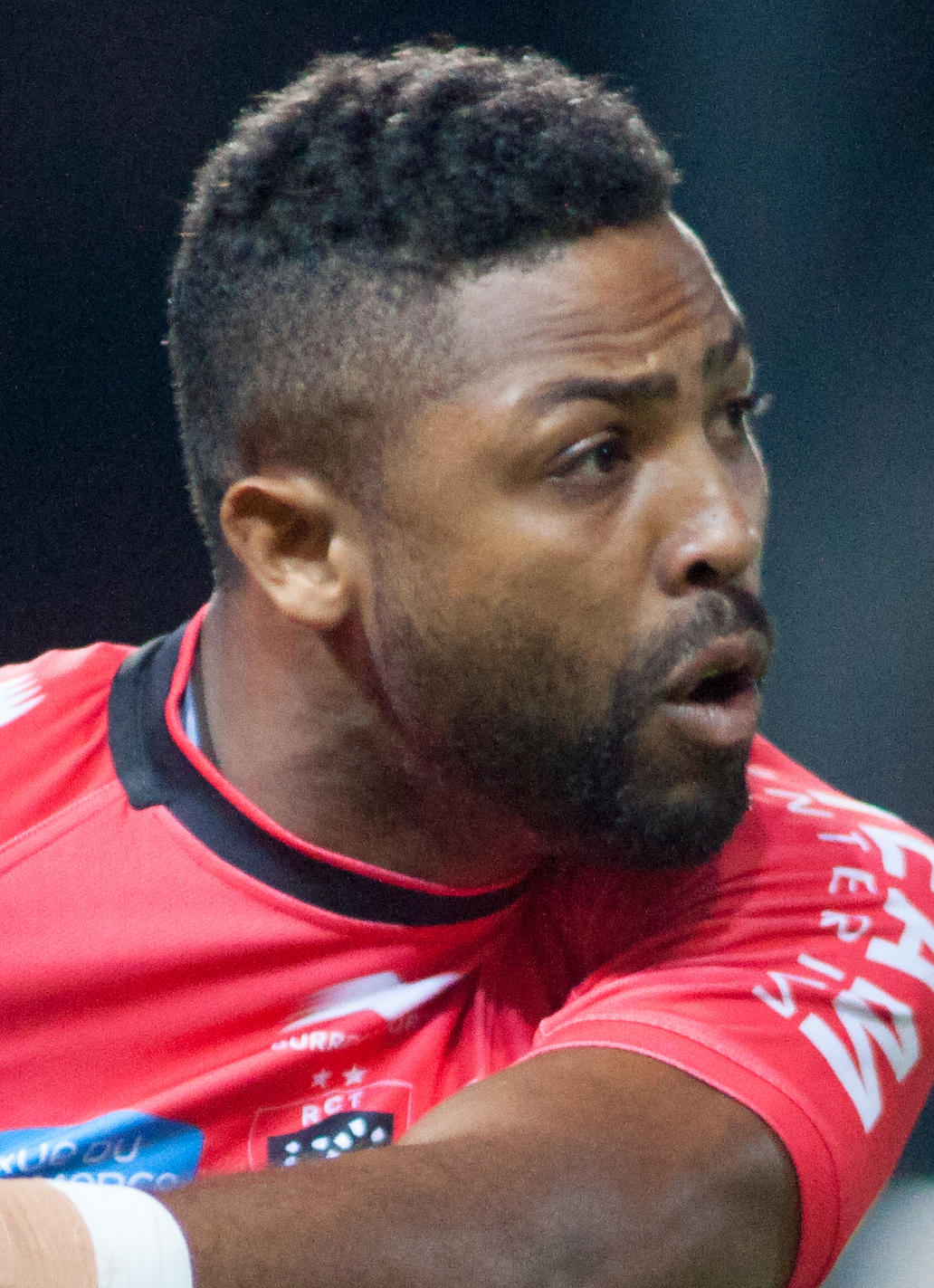
- Armitage in 2014
- Born: Delon Anthony Armitage; 15 December 1983 (age 42) San Fernando, Trinidad and Tobago
- Height: 1.91 m (6 ft 3 in)
- Weight: 93 kg (14 st 9 lb; 205 lb)
- School: Richmond College, North Westminster Community School off Harrow Road
- Notable relative(s): Steffon Armitage (brother); Guy Armitage (brother)

Rugby union career
- Position: Fullback / Wing / Outside Centre
Youth career
- Richmond
- Racing Rugby Club de Nice
Senior career
Years	Team	Apps	(Points)
2002–2012	London Irish	165	(330)
2012–2016	Toulon	103	(188)
2016–2019	Lyon	42	(27)
International career
Years	Team	Apps	(Points)
	France U16	3	(3)
- England Saxons
2008–2011	England	26	(44)
Coaching career
- Years: Team
- 2020: Chinnor

Delon Anthony Armitage (born 15 December 1983) is a rugby union coach and former player who played at wing or fullback for Lyon OU and is capped for England. He also occasionally played centre. Armitage started out at London Irish and Toulon. He sometimes did place kicking, mainly from a distance or if the regular kicker was unable to take it. He left Toulon at the end of the 2015/2016 season to join French Top 14 side Lyon. He retired at the end of the 2018/2019 season.

== Early career ==
From 1996 to 2002, Armitage lived in Roquefort-les-Pins on the French Riviera and from the age of 12 Armitage began playing for Rugby Nice Côte d'Azur Université-Racing. Armitage was rejected by the France Under-16s, who claimed he was too tall and skinny. On his return to London, Armitage joined Richmond before joining London Irish. Armitage joined the Academy in 2002, where he played for the England U19's and was involved in the team that won the U19's National Cup (02-03). From there he progressed to the U21 squad. His talent was recognised and Armitage played for England in the IRB World Sevens tournament 2005. In August 2009 he took part in the Middlesex Sevens tournament in Twickenham where he helped London Irish to victory over Samerai International to take the championship. In May 2013 he scored Toulon's only try of the match as they won the 2013 Heineken Cup Final by 16-15 against Clermont Auvergne.

== England career ==
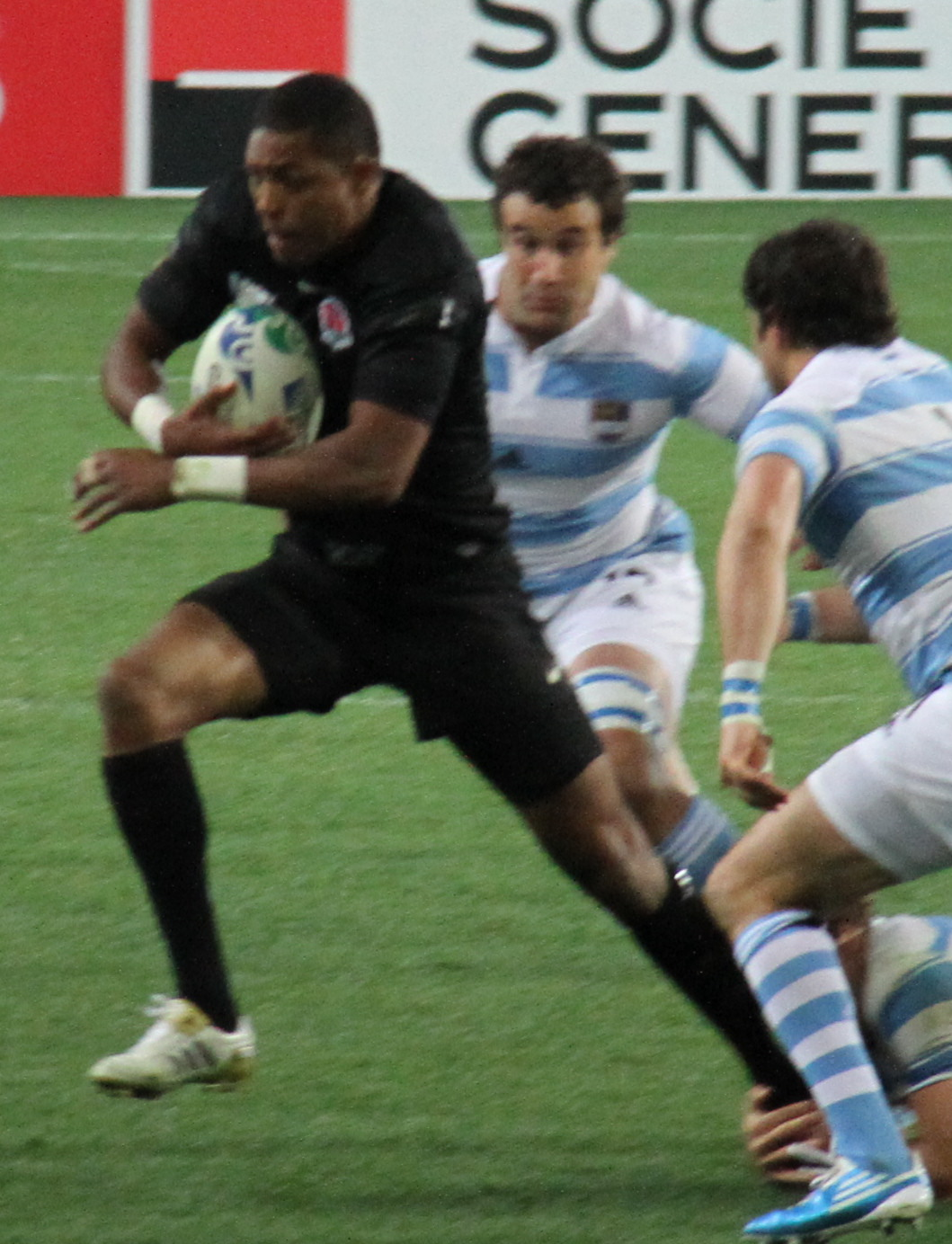
Armitage during 2011 RWC

On 8 November 2008, Armitage made his full England debut against the Pacific Islanders at fullback following injuries to Mathew Tait and Nick Abendanon. He put in a man of the match winning performance setting up a try for winger Paul Sackey. English Rugby legend and team manager Martin Johnson described Armitage's debut performance as outstanding. Armitage was one of the few England players to warrant any praise during the 2008 Autumn Internationals in which England lost three out of their four matches. Armitage scored his first international points with a 45-meter drop goal against Australia.

On 3 February 2009, Armitage and his brother, Steffon Armitage, were both named in England's starting XV to take on Italy in the opening game of the 2009 Six Nations. The ninth pair and the first time since Rory Underwood and Tony Underwood stepped onto the field together in 1995 that two brothers have played in the same England team.

For the next match in the 2009 Six Nations Championship, he scored his first try against Wales at the Millennium Stadium. He also scored a penalty and a try in England's 14–13 loss against Ireland at Croke Park. Armitage scored his third England try in as many games when he touched down against France at Twickenham, in a match England went on to win 34–10. He celebrated his try by kissing the England badge on his shirt, quite possibly to highlight his snub by the France Under-16s.

He played in England's two test matches against Argentina, scoring two tries in the first test.

=== International Tries ===
Try	Opposing team	Location	Venue	Competition	Date	Result	Score
1	Wales	Cardiff, Wales	Millennium Stadium	2009 Six Nations Championship	14 February 2009	Loss	23 – 15
2	Ireland	Dublin, Ireland	Croke Park	2009 Six Nations Championship	28 February 2009	Loss	14 – 13
3	France	London, England	Twickenham Stadium	2009 Six Nations Championship	15 March 2009	Win	34 – 10
4	Argentina	Manchester, England	Old Trafford	2009 June rugby union tests	6 June 2009	Win	37 – 15
5	Argentina	Manchester, England	Old Trafford	2009 June rugby union tests	6 June 2009	Win	37 – 15
6	Ireland	Dublin, Ireland	Aviva Stadium	2011 Rugby World Cup warm-up matches	27 August 2011	Win	9 – 20
7	Georgia	Dunedin, New Zealand	Otago Stadium	2011 Rugby World Cup	18 September 2011	Win	41 – 10

== Coaching career ==
In July 2020, it was confirmed that Armitage had returned to England to become backs coach at National League 1 side Chinnor. During the summer of 2022, he joined National League 2 team Dorking RFC.

== Personal life ==
Armitage's stepfather John played rugby for Hatfield and encouraged his sons to such an extent that four of them are now professional players. Guy plays for Wasps RFC while Steffon plays for Section Paloise. Bevon left RFU Championship club Doncaster Knights in 2010 for his brothers' youth club Rugby Nice Côte d'Azur Université-Racing; however, he returned to Doncaster from the 2013-14 season. Armitage was the first native West Indian to play rugby union for England. He has two children with Jemma, whom he married in May 2012, a son Cameron (born 2007) and a daughter Chloe (born May 2009). He is a Queens Park Rangers fan.

Away from rugby, Armitage enjoys cricket and tennis. His hero is former All Blacks blindside flanker Jerry Collins.

== Controversies ==
December 2014: Delon Armitage lands 12-week ban after Toulon full back is found guilty of verbally abusing Leicester fans.

May 2013: Calls former England hooker Brian Moore a 'fat p***k' and tells him to 'Go write another s*** book' in response to criticism of his goading try celebration in the Heineken Cup final.

January 2012: Arrested for an alleged altercation outside a Torquay nightclub in the early hours of a Sunday morning. A local man was allegedly left with a split lip after the run-in.

November 2011: Banned for five weeks after striking Bath lock Dave Attwood and committing a dangerous tackle on winger Tom Biggs - his third ban for foul play within six months, including a suspension in the World Cup quarter final.

January 2011: Banned for eight weeks after verbally abusing and pushing a doping official following London Irish’s 25-24 defeat by Bath on New Year’s Day.
