= Declan Kidney =

Irish rugby union player & coach

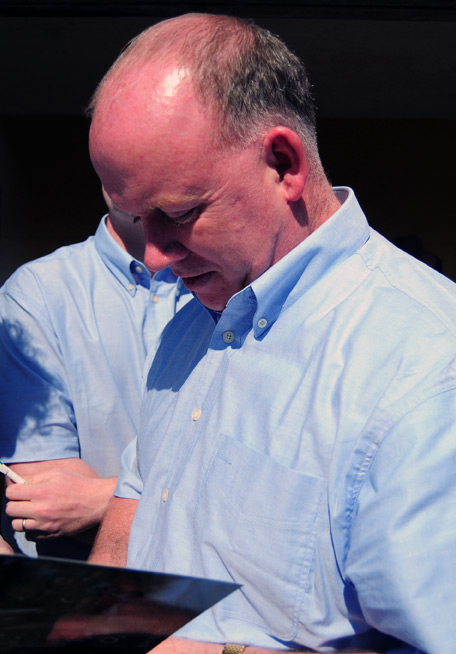
- Kidney in 2009
- Born: Declan Kidney; 20 October 1959 (age 67) Bishopstown, County Cork, Ireland

Rugby union career
- Position: Director of Rugby
- Current team: London Irish
Amateur team(s)
Years	Team	Apps	(Points)
- University College Cork
–	Dolphin		
Coaching career
- Years: Team
- 1998–2002: Munster (assistant coach)
- 2002–2004: Ireland (assistant coach)
- 2004: Newport Gwent Dragons (head coach)
- 2004–2005: Leinster (head coach)
- 2005–2008: Munster (head coach)
- 2008–2013: Ireland (head coach)
- 2013–2018: UCC (Director of Sport)
- 2018–2023: London Irish (Director of Rugby)
- Correct as of 6 June 2023

Declan Kidney (born 20 October 1959) is an Irish rugby union coach. He was the head coach of the Ireland national rugby union team from 2008 to 2013, where he won the 2009 Six Nations with a Grand Slam, winning the 2009 IRB Coach of the Year award. He was also the head coach at Munster, leading them to four Heineken Cup finals, winning twice in 2006 and 2008. He was recently Director of Rugby at London Irish.

== Early life ==
Kidney was born in Bishopstown, County Cork. He played rugby for UCC and later for Dolphin RFC. He studied to become an accounting and mathematics teacher, in which position he was appointed at Presentation Brothers College, Cork, and later became the career guidance officer.

He took on the role of rugby coach at the school, where he had initial success as coach of the junior and later senior side.

== Coaching career ==
=== Youth and professional ===
Following his coaching of the Irish Schools team, Kidney coached the Ireland under 19s team which won the FIRA World Cup in 1998.

After the 1998 Tournament he joined Munster. His initial stint at Munster ended in 2002, when he left to become Ireland's assistant coach. He was replaced at Munster by Alan Gaffney.

In the summer of 2004, he became coach at Newport Gwent Dragons. However, in August 2004, after only 3 months in the job, he left to join Leinster.

He rejoined Munster in 2005, winning the Heineken Cup in his first season back, after losing in both 2000 and 2002 in the final. After this win, Kidney was awarded the 2006 Philips Sports Manager of the Year award, and on 24 May 2008, his Munster squad won the Heineken Cup once again.

=== Ireland (2008–2013) ===
He coached the Irish team to the Grand Slam and Triple Crown in 2009, in his first year as head coach. In June 2009, coached Ireland Wolfhounds, then known as Ireland A, to their first Churchill Cup. He was awarded the 2009 IRB Coach of the Year. He was also awarded the 2009 Phillips Manager of the Year for the third time in four years, beating Brian Cody, John Oxx and Giovanni Trapattoni to the title.

Ireland's international fortunes declined after 2009 with a poor string of results, which was the antithesis to the success of its provinces Leinster, Ulster, Connacht and Munster. In 2011 Kidney led Ireland to the quarter finals of the 2011 Rugby World Cup, at which Ireland recorded their first-ever clean sweep of their pool, including Ireland's first-ever win at a world cup against a major rugby nation (Australia). A series of poor game management decisions by senior players saw them defeated 22–10 by Wales. Ireland suffered their heaviest defeat in history in 2012 going down by 60–0 against New Zealand, and by 2013 had slipped to their worst IRB World Ranking of ninth when Ireland suffered a string of injuries to key players, the likes of which Ireland has not suffered previously nor suffered since. After finishing fifth in the 2013 Six Nations Championship, which included an historic loss to Italy, the IRFU, on 2 April 2013, decided to terminate Kidney's contract. Kidney finished with a record of 28 wins, 3 draws and 22 defeats.

=== UCC ===
In August 2013, Kidney was appointed as the Director of Sport and Physical Activity at UCC.

=== London Irish ===
Kidney joined London Irish in March 2018 as technical consultant. The roles reunited Kidney with Les Kiss who was appointed head coach on the same day. He later became Director of Rugby on 22 May 2018 following the resignation of Nick Kennedy.

== Honours ==
Munster

- Celtic League (1): 2002/03
- Heineken Cup (2): 2005/06, 2007/08

Ireland

- IRB Under 19 Rugby World Championship (1) 1998
- Churchill Cup (1): 2009
- Triple Crown (1): 2009
- Six Nations Championship (1): 2009 (Grand Slam)

Individual

- IRB International Coach of the Year 2009

London Irish

- RFU Championship (1) 2018–19 RFU Championship

Awards
Preceded by Graham Henry	IRB International Coach of the Year; 2009	Succeeded by Graham Henry

Preceded by (England) Nick Kennedy	London Irish coach 2018-	Succeeded by incumbent
Preceded by (Ireland) Eddie O'Sullivan	Ireland rugby coach 2008–13	Succeeded by Joe Schmidt (New Zealand)
Preceded by (Australia) Alan Gaffney	Munster Rugby coach 2005–08	Succeeded by Tony McGahan (Australia)
