= Nick Kennedy =

England international rugby union player

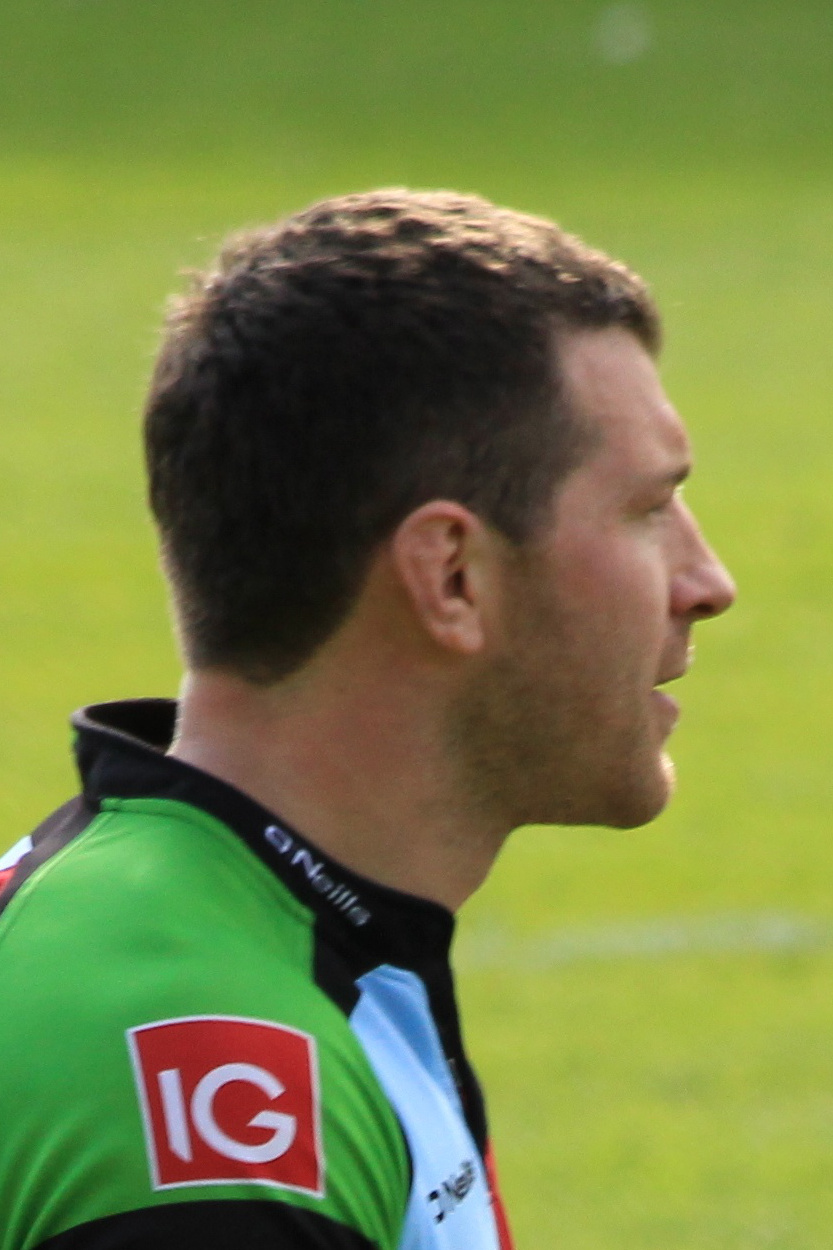
- Born: Nicholas John Kennedy; 19 August 1981 (age 45) Southampton, Hampshire, England
- Height: 2.03 m (6 ft 8 in)
- Weight: 110 kg (17 st 5 lb)
- School: Claires Court School; British School of Brussels
- University: University of Portsmouth

Rugby union career
- Position: Lock
- Current team: London Irish
Youth career
- Marlow
Senior career
| Years | Team | Apps | (Points) |
| 2001–2012 | London Irish | 217 | (10) |
| 2012–2013 | Toulon | 27 | (10) |
| 2013–2014 | Harlequins | 17 | (0) |
- Correct as of 17 May 2014
International career
| Years | Team | Apps | (Points) |
| 2006–2010 | England Saxons | | |
| 2008–2009 | England | 7 | (5) |
Coaching career
- Years: Team
- 2016–2018: London Irish (Director of Rugby)
- Correct as of 22 March 2018

Nick Kennedy (born 19 August 1981) is a retired English rugby union player and former Director of Rugby at London Irish. He played Lock for England, London Irish, Toulon and Harlequins.

His uncle Duncan Kennedy is a BBC news correspondent.

Kennedy represented England Saxons at the 2006 Churchill Cup and 2007 Churchill Cup.

He was called into the England Saxons side that defeated Ireland A on 1 February 2008.

Kennedy was selected for the 2008 summer tour of New Zealand. He was later picked for Martin Johnson's Elite Player Squad on 1 June 2008 ahead of Ben Kay. He started his first game against the Pacific Islanders in which he scored a try.

Kennedy participated in every game of the 2009 Six Nations.

In 2012 Kennedy was signed for Toulon for the upcoming 2012/13 season In May 2013 he started as Toulon won the 2013 Heineken Cup Final by 16–15 against Clermont Auvergne. Following his request to be released from Toulon, he returned to England to sign for Harlequins for 2013/14 season.

After just one season at Harlequins, Kennedy announced his retirement from playing in May 2014 in order to pursue a coaching career after he was appointed academy director at his former club London Irish. On 1 July 2016 he was announced as the new Director of Rugby in a new coaching setup following the departure of Tom Coventry. He left his role on 22 March 2018 shortly after the appointment of Declan Kidney as technical consultant and Les Kiss as head coach.
