= Alasdair Dickinson =

Scotland international rugby union player

- Born: Alasdair Granville Dickinson; 11 September 1983 (age 43) Dundee, Scotland
- Height: 185 cm (6 ft 1 in)
- Weight: 108 kg (17 st 0 lb)
- School: High School of Dundee
- University: Napier University

Rugby union career
- Position: Loosehead prop
Amateur team(s)
Years	Team	Apps	(Points)
2001–03	Dundee HSFP		
2003–05	Heriot's FP		
Senior career
Years	Team	Apps	(Points)
2003–07	Edinburgh	55	(40)
2007–11	Gloucester	72	(15)
2007	→Moseley(loan)	2	(5)
2011–13	Sale Sharks	28	(5)
2013–18	Edinburgh	54	(5)
International career
Years	Team	Apps	(Points)
2007–16	Scotland	58	(10)
Coaching career
- Years: Team
- 2018–19: Scottish Rugby Academy (Scrum coach)
- 2019–20: Scotland women (Scrum coach)
- 2020–21: Bristol Bears (Scrum coach)
- 2021–: Glasgow Warriors (Scrum coach)

Alasdair Dickinson (born 11 September 1983) is a Scottish rugby union coach. He was previously a Scotland international rugby union player; and played for the clubs Edinburgh Rugby, Gloucester and Sale Sharks. He played as a prop.

== Rugby Union career ==
=== Amateur career ===
Dickinson played for Dundee HSFP and Heriot's FP. He is a product of the Scottish Institute of Sport.

=== Professional career ===
Dickinson played professionally for Edinburgh Rugby from 2003.

Dickinson signed for Gloucester Rugby from Edinburgh for the 2007–08 season. 2008–09 really saw him force his way into the Gloucester first team to a regular basis as he made 20 appearances in total.

Dickinson moved to Sale Sharks for the 2011–12 season, joining international teammates Fraser McKenzie and Richie Vernon.

Dickinson rejoined Edinburgh Rugby from the Sale Sharks for the 2013–14 season.

In 2016 Dickinson had suffered a shoulder injury which prevented him from playing for the duration of the 2016–17 season. On his return in 2017 he aggravated a foot injury. He retired from playing in 2018.

=== International career ===
Dickinson made his Scotland debut against New Zealand at the RWC 2007. He was a late replacement to the squad, made when Allan Jacobsen was injured. He made 58 appearances for Scotland and played in three World Cups.

=== Coaching career ===
On his playing retirement Dickinson became a scrum coach, working with Scotland Women, Scotland U20s and the Scottish Rugby Academies.

Dickinson became a scrum coach for Bristol Bears in 2020.

On 19 April 2021 it was announced that Dickinson would join Glasgow Warriors as scrum coach in the summer of 2021.
