= Riki Flutey =

British Lions & England international rugby union player

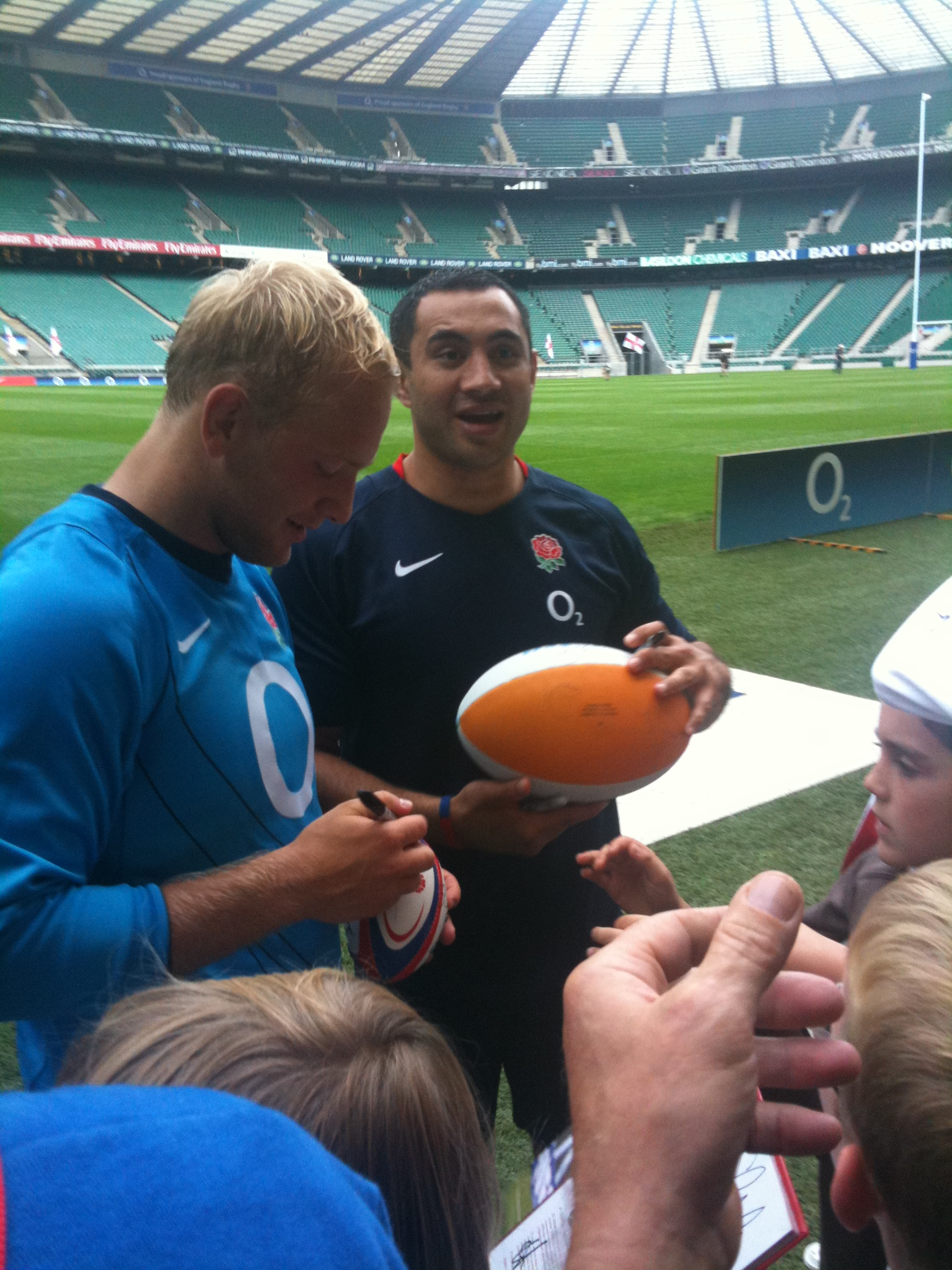
- Born: Riki John Flutey; 10 February 1980 (age 46) Wairarapa, New Zealand
- Height: 1.78 m (5 ft 10 in)
- Weight: 92 kg (14 st 7 lb)
- School: Te Aute College

Rugby union career
- Position(s): Centre, fly-half
Youth career
- Petone Rugby Club
Senior career
Years	Team	Apps	(Points)
2005–2007	London Irish	48	(269)
2007–2009	London Wasps	45	(53)
2009–2010	CA Brive	9	(0)
2010–2012	London Wasps	36	(15)
2012–2013	Ricoh Black Rams	17	(32)
Provincial / State sides
Years	Team	Apps	(Points)
1998	Hawke's Bay		
1999–2005, 2014	Wellington		
Super Rugby
Years	Team	Apps	(Points)
2002–2005	Hurricanes	38	(74)
International career
Years	Team	Apps	(Points)
2002–2005	New Zealand Māori		
2008–2011	England	14	(20)
2009	British & Irish Lions	1	(0)

Riki John Flutey (born 10 February 1980) is a retired rugby union player who played internationally for England (winning 14 caps) and the British & Irish Lions (one cap). Born in Wairarapa, New Zealand, he represented New Zealand in the U19 age group before qualifying to play for England through residency.

A centre or fly-half, he played for Hawke's Bay, Wellington and the Hurricanes in New Zealand before moving to England in 2005. He then played for London Irish and London Wasps in England, Brive in France and Ricoh Black Rams in Japan.

== Rugby career ==
Born in Wairarapa, Flutey was a member of the New Zealand team that won the U19 World Cup in 1999. He first played for the New Zealand Māori in 2002.

He made his representative debut for Hawkes Bay in 1998, and from 1999 to 2005 he played for the Wellington Lions in the National Provincial Championship.

Flutey made his debut for the Hurricanes against the Blues in the opening round of the 2002 Super 12.

After making only five appearances in the 2005 Super 12 season, Flutey moved to England to play for London Irish.

After his arrival at the Exiles the team achieved a play-off place in the 2005–06 Guinness Premiership, losing to the Leicester Tigers. That season, Flutey also started in the final of the European Challenge Cup, losing to Gloucester Rugby. At the end of the 2006–07 season, Flutey left London Irish to join London Wasps.

He was rewarded for an excellent 2007–08 début season with Wasps, winning the League, and he was named Player of the Year at the PRA awards.

Flutey decided to join Top 14 club Brive, from the 2009–10 season, joining other English internationals such as Andy Goode, Steve Thompson and Jamie Noon. He played just five games for the club before his season was ended by a shoulder injury.

Flutey rejoined London Wasps for the 2010–11 season after just one season at Brive. He was contracted for two-years but, by mutual consent, the contract was cancelled as his time in France was blighted by a shoulder injury. The club were not pleased that he choose to play for England in the 2010 Six Nations Championship having just recovered from injury and not having featured for the club for months. He re-injured the same shoulder playing for England in the tournament and was ruled out of playing again during the 2009–10 season.

At the end of the 2012 season Flutey quit Wasps to join Ricoh Black Rams

=== England ===
Flutey qualified for England on residency grounds at the beginning of the 2008–09 season – he had announced on 14 May 2008 that he would be available for England selection as soon as he had completed his three-year residential qualification in September.

On 1 July 2008, Flutey was named in Martin Johnson's first England Elite Squad. Flutey made his England debut against the Pacific Islanders at Twickenham on 8 November 2008. He scored his first international try against Italy in the 2009 Six Nations.

After two narrow losses against Wales and Ireland, he was influential in England's 34–10 victory over France, scoring two tries and setting up another. In the next game against Scotland, he scored again and was chosen as the man of the match. His four tries in the 2009 Six Nations was the joint highest.

=== British & Irish Lions ===
He was selected for the British & Irish Lions for their 2009 tour to South Africa. It is sometimes stated that he became the first person to play for and against the Lions when he played for them in the third and final test of the tour, however this is inaccurate. The first man to play for and against the Lions was Tom Reid. Reid played for the Lions in 1955 and later played against them when he represented Eastern Canada against the Lions in Toronto in 1959.

== Assault case ==
On 3 December 2001 Flutey was charged with grievous bodily harm in Rosario, Argentina. Argentinian teenager Gabriel Capotosti suffered a broken nose and right eye socket that required corrective plastic surgery in an unprovoked assault by Flutey outside a mini mart. Consequently, Flutey spent four nights in a police cell, then under house arrest at the team's hotel while the Wellington union arranged his bail of US$35,000 (NZ$84,800), before returning to New Zealand on 10 December 2001. Gabriel Capotosti's family later filed a civil suit against Flutey. The case was finally settled in December 2008, with the charges completely dropped on condition that Flutey does not reoffend for a set period.
