= Scott Gray (rugby union) =

Scotland international rugby union player

- Born: Scott Donald Gray; 25 February 1978 (age 48) Salisbury, Rhodesia
- Height: 1.89 m (6 ft 2 in)
- Weight: 98 kg (216 lb)
- School: Peterhouse Boys' School

Rugby union career
- Position: Flanker
Senior career
Years	Team	Apps	(Points)
2002-04	Bath		
2004-07	Border Reivers		
2007-08	Doncaster Knights		
2008-11	Northampton Saints		
International career
Years	Team	Apps	(Points)
2004-2009	Scotland	8	(5)

Scott Donald Gray (born 25 February 1978) in Salisbury, Rhodesia (now Harare, Zimbabwe) is a retired rugby union footballer. Gray played as a flanker.

Gray was schooled at Peterhouse Boys, an independent school in Mashonaland East, Zimbabwe. He was head of Paget House and a school prefect. Gray moved to Australia aged 18. After spending two years in Canberra with the Brumbies academy he won a development contract with a view to playing in the Super 12.

However, Gray chose to switch codes and enjoyed a spell playing rugby league with Brisbane Broncos before joining Bath in the Guinness Premiership. From Bath Gray joined Border Reivers, playing for the side until they were disbanded by the Scottish Rugby Union.

Gray then joined English National Division One side Doncaster Knights before stepping up into the Premiership again with Northampton at the start of the 2008–09 season.

He won his first Scotland cap against Australia at Murrayfield in 2004, but would have to wait four years for his second chance on the international stage when, rejuvenated by his move to Northampton, he was called into Frank Hadden's squad for the autumn internationals. At the beginning of the 2009–10 season Gray had 8 caps for Scotland.

He intends to return to his former school and take up waterpolo and rugby coaching in 2011. This comes after a long-term injury that has halted his career with Scotland.
