= Andy Powell (rugby) =

British Lions & Wales international rugby union & league footballer & coach

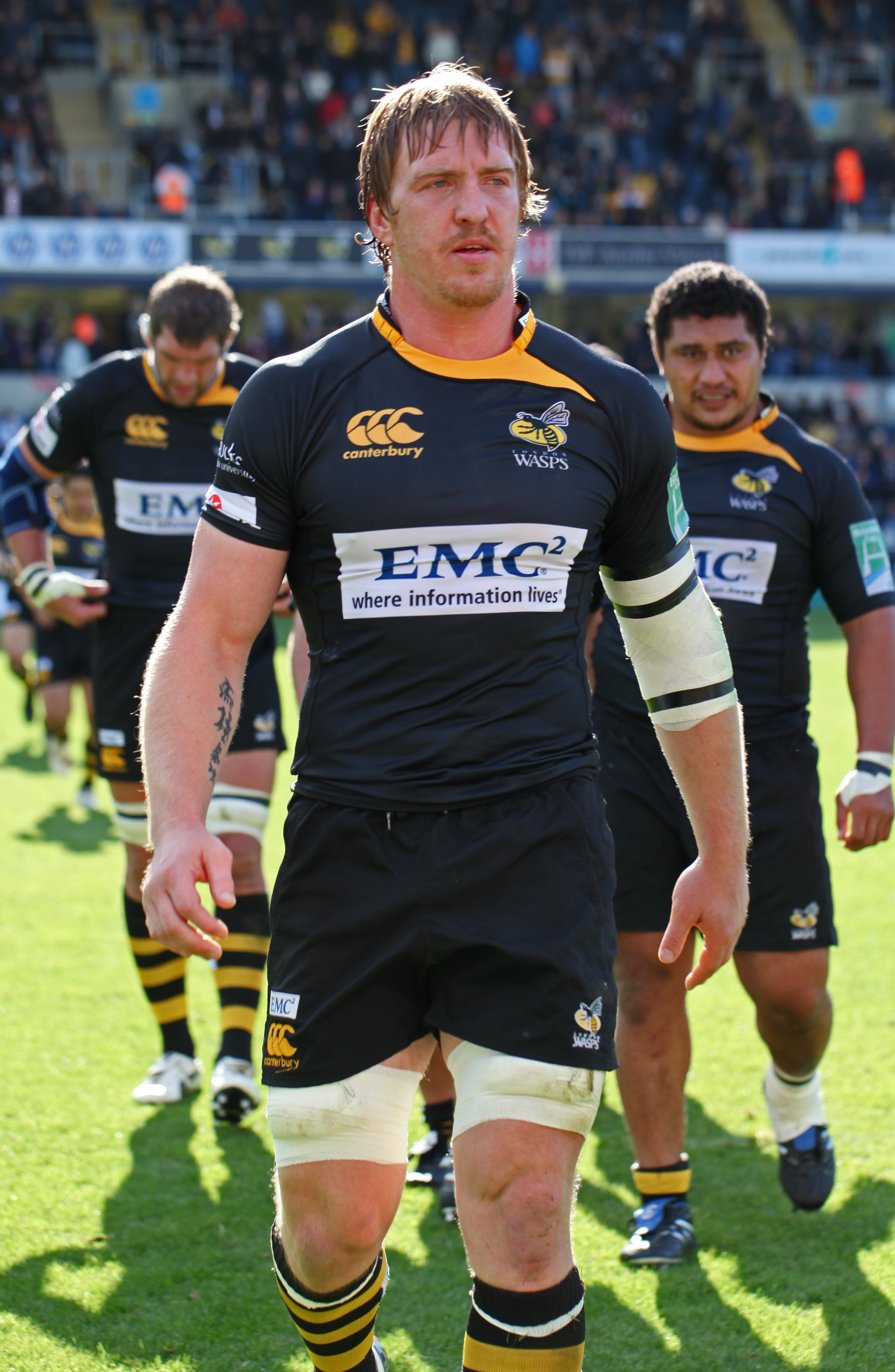
- Born: Andrew Powell; 23 August 1981 (age 45) Brecon, Wales
- Height: 197 cm (6 ft 6 in)
- Weight: 112 kg (17 st 9 lb; 247 lb)
- School: Llandovery College

Rugby union career
- Position(s): Number eight, Flanker
- Current team: Merthyr
Senior career
Years	Team	Apps	(Points)
1999–2000	Newport	1	(0)
2000–2001	Llandovery	18	(10)
2001–2003	Newport	49	(55)
2003	Béziers	0	(0)
2003–2004	Leicester	1	(0)
2004–2005	Scarlets	1	(0)
2005–2010	Cardiff Blues	63	(25)
2010–2011	Wasps	21	(5)
2011–2013	Sale	38	(15)
2014–2015	NG Dragons	10	(0)
2015–2016	Merthyr	0	(0)
- Correct as of 15 July 2015
International career
Years	Team	Apps	(Points)
2008–2012	Wales	23	(5)
2009	British and Irish Lions	0	(0)
- Correct as of 12 February 2012
- Rugby league career

Playing information
- Position: Prop, Second-row
Club
Years	Team	Pld	T	G	FG	P
2013–14	Wigan Warriors	5	1	0	0	4
2013	→ South Wales Scorpions	2	0	0	0	0
	Total	7	1	0	0	4

Andrew Powell (born 23 August 1981) is a Welsh former rugby union and rugby league footballer, who last played for Merthyr RFC. He is a former international rugby union player having played for both the Wales sevens team, and the Wales national rugby union team as well as touring with the British and Irish Lions (uncapped). His regular rugby union position was either No. 8 or blindside flanker in the back row.

As of 2024, he is coaching Whitchurch Rugby Club in North Shropshire, in 2025 he became the DOR at Long Buckby Rugby Club in Northamptonshire

== Rugby union career ==
Born in Brecon, Powell attended Llandovery College, and played as an amateur for both Llandovery and in Halifax. In 1999, he joined Newport RFC, and over the following four seasons he played in fifty matches, scoring eleven tries. Mentored by South African Ian McIntosh, he made the Wales Under-21 squad. He then joined Leicester Tigers, before returning to Wales via French club AS Béziers Hérault with the Llanelli Scarlets.

=== Cardiff Blues: 2005–2010 ===
Powell joined the Cardiff Blues in the summer of 2005, making an impact in his first season, winning a number of man of the match awards. The 2006/07 season was an exceptionally unlucky one for Powell, who injured his left shoulder in a pre-season friendly against Bristol. The injury required total shoulder reconstruction and he returned to action at the beginning of April 2007. Three games in to his comeback, he suffered an identical injury to his right shoulder, which would also require reconstruction. In December 2009, Powell was one of only three British players to be selected for the Barbarians, in their encounter with New Zealand.

=== Wasps: 2010–2011 ===
In July 2010, Blues agreed to release Powell from his contract, even though it had 12 months remaining, stating that Powell had "lost his way" since the buggy incident. Early speculation linked Powell with newly promoted French rugby union team SU Agen, and with Welsh Rugby league club Crusaders. But Powell joined London Wasps on a 12-month contract in July 2010, coached by Wales defence coach Shaun Edwards, which he hoped would improve his chances of a return to the national squad. On 5 May 2011, Powell left London Wasps by mutual consent after a drunken brawl outside a pub.

=== Sale Sharks: 2011–2013 ===
In May 2011, Powell signed for Sale Sharks after his release by London Wasps. In October 2012, Sale fined him £5,000 for abusive language and making offensive hand gestures to spectators.

=== Wigan Warriors: 2013–2014 ===
In 2013, he joined Wigan Warriors.

=== Newport Gwent Dragons: 2014–2015 ===
In June 2014, it was announced that Powell had signed a deal with Newport Gwent Dragons.

=== Merthyr: 2015– 2016 ===
In July 2015 Powell joined Merthyr RFC.

In October 2016, Merthyr announced Powell had retired from the game with immediate affect, after a re-occurring knee injury.

Powell later revealed he had been suffering depression, and cites the condition as a reason for his retirement.

In September 2024 Powell signed as Head Coach for Whitchurch Rugby Club in North Shropshire.

== International ==
Powell played his first cap for Wales against South Africa on 8 November 2008 where he won Man of the Match in the 15 – 20 loss.

On 21 April 2009, Powell was named as a member of the British and Irish Lions for the 2009 tour to South Africa.

=== Golf buggy incident ===
Powell was arrested "for taking and driving away a golf buggy" a few hours after the Welsh team's last-minute victory over Scotland in their 2010 Six Nations match. He was arrested near Junction 33 on the M4 motorway at 0600 GMT 14 February 2010. The following day, for behaviour "contrary to the squad's code of conduct", he was removed from Wales' 35-man training squad for the Six Nations 2010, and played no further part in the tournament. He was later given a 15-month driving ban and fined after admitting the offence at Cardiff Magistrates' Court.

=== International tries ===
Try	Opponent	Location	Venue	Competition	Date	Result
1	Argentina	Cardiff, Wales	Millennium Stadium	2011 Rugby World Cup warm-up matches	20 August 2011	Win

== Rugby league ==
Welsh Super League club Crusaders made an approach to sign Powell in 2010, but the offer was rejected. Powell's then agent Mike Burton stated that Powell had a year left on his contract with Cardiff and that he would be honouring it, but Powell then parted company with Burton.

Powell has stated that he is interested in switching to rugby league and played during his teenage years with amateur club Cardiff Demons. The Crusaders were interested in signing him for the 2010 season although he stated he would be interested playing in the next year or two and still had ambitions to represent Wales in rugby union. Powell's new agent Emanuele Palladino confirmed that Powell would not be joining the Crusaders but he remained a target for Super League clubs. After being sacked by Wasps he again received interest from Crusaders to join them after the 2011 Rugby Union World Cup.

In April 2013 Powell confirmed he would join Wigan Warriors at the end of the 2012–13 rugby union season. He scored his first try for Wigan Warriors in the home match v Hull FC on 30 August 2013.

== Personal information ==
Powell married Natasha Gascoine on 25 May 2013 in Llantrisant.
