= 2012 Six Nations Championship squads =

Rugby union competition squads

This is a list of the complete squads for the 2012 Six Nations Championship, an annual rugby union tournament contested by the national rugby teams of England, France, Ireland, Italy, Scotland and Wales. Each country is entitled to name a squad of 39 players to contest the championship. They may also invite additional players along prior to the start of the championship, while the coach can call up replacement players if squad members suffer serious injury.

NB

- Ages are given as of 4 February 2012, the opening day of the tournament.
- All cap totals are as of the start of the tournament, and do not include appearances made during the competition.

== England ==
Interim England manager Stuart Lancaster announced a 32-man England squad for the 2012 Six Nations on 11 January. Although lock Louis Deacon was named to the squad, he was ruled out of the tournament with a hamstring injury.

Team Manager: (England) Stuart Lancaster

Note: Flags indicate national union for the club/province as defined by World Rugby.

Player	Position	Date of birth (age)	Caps	Club/province
Dylan Hartley	Hooker	24 March 1986 (aged 25)	34	(England) Northampton Saints
Lee Mears	Hooker	5 March 1979 (aged 32)	38	(England) Bath
Rob Webber	Hooker	1 August 1986 (aged 25)	0	(England) London Wasps
Alex Corbisiero	Prop	30 August 1988 (aged 23)	10	(England) London Irish
Dan Cole	Prop	9 May 1987 (aged 24)	23	(England) Leicester Tigers
Joe Marler	Prop	7 July 1990 (aged 21)	0	(England) Harlequins
Matt Stevens	Prop	1 October 1982 (aged 29)	39	(England) Saracens
David Wilson	Prop	9 April 1985 (aged 26)	19	(England) Bath
Mouritz Botha	Lock	29 January 1982 (aged 30)	1	(England) Saracens
Courtney Lawes	Lock	23 February 1989 (aged 22)	13	(England) Northampton Saints
Tom Palmer	Lock	27 March 1979 (aged 32)	33	(France) Stade Français
Callum Clark	Flanker	10 June 1989 (aged 22)	0	(England) Northampton Saints
Tom Croft	Flanker	7 November 1985 (aged 26)	31	(England) Leicester Tigers
Chris Robshaw	Flanker	4 June 1986 (aged 25)	1	(England) Harlequins
Tom Wood	Flanker	3 November 1986 (aged 25)	9	(England) Northampton Saints
Phil Dowson	Number 8	1 October 1981 (aged 30)	0	(England) Northampton Saints
Ben Morgan	Number 8	18 February 1989 (aged 22)	0	(Wales) Scarlets
Lee Dickson	Scrum-half	29 March 1985 (aged 26)	0	(England) Northampton Saints
Joe Simpson	Scrum-half	5 July 1988 (aged 23)	1	(England) London Wasps
Ben Youngs	Scrum-half	5 September 1989 (aged 22)	17	(England) Leicester Tigers
Toby Flood	Fly-half	8 August 1985 (aged 26)	46	(England) Leicester Tigers
Charlie Hodgson	Fly-half	12 November 1980 (aged 31)	36	(England) Saracens
Brad Barritt	Centre	7 August 1986 (aged 25)	0	(England) Saracens
Owen Farrell	Centre	21 September 1991 (aged 20)	0	(England) Saracens
Manu Tuilagi	Centre	18 May 1991 (aged 20)	7	(England) Leicester Tigers
Jordan Turner-Hall	Centre	5 January 1988 (aged 24)	0	(England) Harlequins
Chris Ashton	Wing	29 March 1987 (aged 24)	18	(England) Northampton Saints
Charlie Sharples	Wing	17 August 1989 (aged 22)	1	(England) Gloucester
David Strettle	Wing	23 July 1983 (aged 28)	7	(England) Saracens
Mike Brown	Fullback	4 September 1985 (aged 26)	3	(England) Harlequins
Ben Foden	Fullback	22 July 1985 (aged 26)	22	(England) Northampton Saints

== France ==
Philippe Saint-André announced a 30-man France squad for the 2011 Six Nations on 5 January. Two days later, Romain Millo-Chluski dislocated his right shoulder in a Top 14 match, potentially ruling him out for the entire Six Nations; Lionel Nallet was named as his replacement. The prop David Attoub is called up in the list for the game against Italy

Head coach: (France) Philippe Saint-André

Note: Flags indicate national union for the club/province as defined by World Rugby.

Player	Position	Date of birth (age)	Caps	Club/province
William Servat	Hooker	9 February 1978 (aged 33)	44	(France) Toulouse
Dimitri Szarzewski	Hooker	26 January 1983 (aged 29)	56	(France) Stade Français
David Attoub	Prop	7 June 1981 (aged 30)	1	(France) Stade Français
Fabien Barcella	Prop	27 October 1983 (aged 28)	20	(France) Biarritz
Vincent Debaty	Prop	2 October 1981 (aged 30)	1	(France) Clermont
Luc Ducalcon	Prop	2 January 1984 (aged 28)	10	(France) Castres
Nicolas Mas	Prop	23 May 1980 (aged 31)	49	(France) Perpignan
Jean-Baptiste Poux	Prop	26 September 1979 (aged 32)	37	(France) Toulouse
Yoann Maestri	Lock	14 January 1988 (aged 24)	0	(France) Toulouse
Lionel Nallet	Lock	14 September 1976 (aged 35)	70	(France) Racing Métro
Pascal Papé	Lock	5 October 1980 (aged 31)	35	(France) Stade Français
Julien Pierre	Lock	31 July 1981 (aged 30)	26	(France) Clermont
Julien Bonnaire	Flanker	20 September 1978 (aged 33)	70	(France) Clermont
Thierry Dusautoir (c)	Flanker	18 November 1981 (aged 30)	49	(France) Toulouse
Yannick Nyanga	Flanker	19 December 1983 (aged 28)	25	(France) Toulouse
Fulgence Ouedraogo	Flanker	21 July 1986 (aged 25)	25	(France) Montpellier
Imanol Harinordoquy	Number 8	20 February 1980 (aged 31)	77	(France) Biarritz
Louis Picamoles	Number 8	5 February 1986 (aged 25)	21	(France) Toulouse
Morgan Parra	Scrum-half	15 November 1988 (aged 23)	36	(France) Clermont
Dimitri Yachvili	Scrum-half	19 September 1980 (aged 31)	59	(France) Biarritz
Lionel Beauxis	Fly-half	24 October 1985 (aged 26)	15	(France) Toulouse
François Trinh-Duc	Fly-half	11 November 1986 (aged 25)	35	(France) Montpellier
Yann David	Centre	15 April 1988 (aged 23)	4	(France) Toulouse
Wesley Fofana	Centre	20 January 1988 (aged 24)	0	(France) Clermont
Maxime Mermoz	Centre	28 July 1986 (aged 25)	15	(France) Perpignan
Aurélien Rougerie	Centre	26 September 1980 (aged 31)	71	(France) Clermont
Vincent Clerc	Wing	7 May 1981 (aged 30)	57	(France) Toulouse
Julien Malzieu	Wing	4 May 1983 (aged 28)	16	(France) Clermont
Alexis Palisson	Wing	9 September 1987 (aged 24)	20	(France) Toulon
Maxime Médard	Fullback	16 November 1986 (aged 25)	28	(France) Toulouse
Clément Poitrenaud	Fullback	20 May 1982 (aged 29)	44	(France) Toulouse

== Ireland ==
Ireland named an initial 24-man squad for the 2012 Six Nations on 18 January. A full squad was announced on 30 January, after the country's A national team, Ireland Wolfhounds, played England Saxons.

Head coach: (Ireland) Declan Kidney

Note: Flags indicate national union for the club/province as defined by World Rugby.

Player	Position	Date of birth (age)	Caps	Club/province
Rory Best	Hooker	15 August 1982 (aged 29)	54	(Ireland) Ulster
Seán Cronin	Hooker	6 May 1986 (aged 25)	15	(Ireland) Leinster
Tom Court	Prop	6 November 1980 (aged 31)	24	(Ireland) Ulster
Cian Healy	Prop	7 October 1987 (aged 24)	25	(Ireland) Leinster
Mike Ross	Prop	21 December 1979 (aged 32)	15	(Ireland) Leinster
Leo Cullen	Lock	9 January 1978 (aged 34)	32	(Ireland) Leinster
Donncha O'Callaghan	Lock	24 March 1979 (aged 32)	80	(Ireland) Munster
Paul O'Connell (c)	Lock	20 October 1979 (aged 32)	82	(Ireland) Munster
Donnacha Ryan	Lock	11 December 1983 (aged 28)	13	(Ireland) Munster
Stephen Ferris	Flanker	2 August 1985 (aged 26)	30	(Ireland) Ulster
Shane Jennings	Flanker	8 July 1981 (aged 30)	12	(Ireland) Leinster
Jamie Heaslip	Number 8	15 December 1983 (aged 28)	43	(Ireland) Leinster
Seán O'Brien	Number 8	14 February 1987 (aged 24)	15	(Ireland) Leinster
Conor Murray	Scrum-half	20 April 1989 (aged 22)	6	(Ireland) Munster
Eoin Reddan	Scrum-half	20 November 1980 (aged 31)	37	(Ireland) Leinster
Ronan O'Gara	Fly-half	7 March 1977 (aged 34)	116	(Ireland) Munster
Johnny Sexton	Fly-half	11 July 1985 (aged 26)	24	(Ireland) Leinster
Gordon D'Arcy	Centre	10 February 1980 (aged 31)	63	(Ireland) Leinster
Fergus McFadden	Centre	17 June 1986 (aged 25)	6	(Ireland) Leinster
Paddy Wallace	Centre	27 August 1979 (aged 32)	29	(Ireland) Ulster
Tommy Bowe	Wing	22 February 1984 (aged 27)	44	(Wales) Ospreys
Keith Earls	Wing	2 October 1987 (aged 24)	26	(Ireland) Munster
Andrew Trimble	Wing	20 October 1984 (aged 27)	41	(Ireland) Ulster
Rob Kearney	Fullback	26 March 1986 (aged 25)	33	(Ireland) Leinster

== Italy ==
Jacques Brunel announced his 30-man squad for the 2012 Six Nations on 16 January. The squad will be cut to 24 before going to Paris for the opener against France.

Head coach: (France) Jacques Brunel

Note: Flags indicate national union for the club/province as defined by World Rugby.

Player	Position	Date of birth (age)	Caps	Club/province
Tommaso D'Apice	Hooker	30 June 1988 (aged 23)	3	(Italy) Aironi
Leonardo Ghiraldini	Hooker	26 December 1984 (aged 27)	41	(Italy) Benetton Treviso
Martin Castrogiovanni	Prop	21 October 1981 (aged 30)	82	(England) Leicester Tigers
Lorenzo Cittadini	Prop	17 December 1982 (aged 29)	8	(Italy) Benetton Treviso
Alberto de Marchi	Prop	13 March 1986 (aged 25)	0	(Italy) Aironi
Andrea Lo Cicero	Prop	7 May 1976 (aged 35)	91	(France) Racing Métro
Marco Bortolami	Lock	12 June 1980 (aged 31)	88	(Italy) Aironi
Quintin Geldenhuys	Lock	19 June 1981 (aged 30)	25	(Italy) Aironi
Antonio Pavanello	Lock	13 October 1982 (aged 29)	5	(Italy) Benetton Treviso
Corniel van Zyl	Lock	27 January 1979 (aged 33)	6	(Italy) Benetton Treviso
Mauro Bergamasco	Flanker	1 May 1979 (aged 32)	88	(Italy) Aironi
Paul Derbyshire	Flanker	3 November 1986 (aged 25)	16	(Italy) Benetton Treviso
Simone Favaro	Flanker	7 November 1988 (aged 23)	6	(Italy) Aironi
Alessandro Zanni	Flanker	31 January 1984 (aged 28)	58	(Italy) Benetton Treviso
Robert Barbieri	Number 8	5 June 1984 (aged 27)	16	(Italy) Benetton Treviso
Sergio Parisse (c)	Number 8	12 September 1983 (aged 28)	83	(France) Stade Français
Edoardo Gori	Scrum-half	5 March 1990 (aged 21)	9	(Italy) Benetton Treviso
Fabio Semenzato	Scrum-half	6 May 1986 (aged 25)	8	(Italy) Benetton Treviso
Kris Burton	Fly-half	4 August 1980 (aged 31)	9	(Italy) Benetton Treviso
Luciano Orquera	Fly-half	12 October 1981 (aged 30)	27	(Italy) Aironi
Gonzalo Canale	Centre	11 November 1982 (aged 29)	72	(France) Clermont
Luca Morisi	Centre	22 February 1991 (aged 20)	0	(Italy) Crociati
Roberto Quartaroli	Centre	29 March 1988 (aged 23)	3	(Italy) Aironi
Alberto Sgarbi	Centre	26 November 1986 (aged 25)	14	(Italy) Benetton Treviso
Tommaso Benvenuti	Wing	12 December 1990 (aged 21)	12	(Italy) Benetton Treviso
Angelo Esposito	Wing	14 June 1993 (aged 18)	0	(Italy) Ruggers Tarvisium
Giulio Toniolatti	Wing	15 January 1984 (aged 28)	8	(Italy) Aironi
Giovanbattista Venditti	Wing	27 March 1990 (aged 21)	0	(Italy) Aironi
Andrea Masi	Fullback	30 March 1981 (aged 30)	64	(Italy) Aironi
Luke McLean	Fullback	29 June 1987 (aged 24)	33	(Italy) Benetton Treviso

== Scotland ==
Andy Robinson announced Scotland's 36-man squad for the Six Nations on 5 January. Steven Shingler, initially chosen for the squad, was confirmed to be ineligible for Scotland by the International Rugby Board due to his caps for Wales U20. Moray Low was ruled out for 2 months, his place in the squad was taken by clubmate Ed Kalman.

On 24 January, Ross Ford was named captain for the Six Nations.

Head coach: (England) Andy Robinson

Note: Flags indicate national union for the club/province as defined by World Rugby.

Player	Position	Date of birth (age)	Caps	Club/province
Ross Ford (c)	Hooker	23 April 1984 (aged 27)	53	(Scotland) Edinburgh
Dougie Hall	Hooker	24 September 1980 (aged 31)	37	(Scotland) Glasgow Warriors
Scott Lawson	Hooker	28 September 1981 (aged 30)	29	(England) Gloucester
Geoff Cross	Prop	11 December 1982 (aged 29)	8	(Scotland) Edinburgh
Alasdair Dickinson	Prop	11 September 1983 (aged 28)	24	(England) Sale Sharks
Allan Jacobsen	Prop	22 September 1978 (aged 33)	60	(Scotland) Edinburgh
Ed Kalman	Prop	7 December 1982 (aged 29)	0	(Scotland) Glasgow Warriors
Euan Murray	Prop	7 August 1980 (aged 31)	41	(England) Newcastle Falcons
Richie Gray	Lock	24 August 1989 (aged 22)	16	(Scotland) Glasgow Warriors
Jim Hamilton	Lock	17 November 1982 (aged 29)	34	(England) Gloucester
Alastair Kellock	Lock	14 June 1981 (aged 30)	36	(Scotland) Glasgow Warriors
Fraser McKenzie	Lock	28 March 1988 (aged 23)	0	(England) Sale Sharks
John Barclay	Flanker	24 September 1986 (aged 25)	32	(Scotland) Glasgow Warriors
Kelly Brown	Flanker	8 June 1982 (aged 29)	49	(England) Saracens
Rob Harley	Flanker	26 May 1990 (aged 21)	0	(Scotland) Glasgow Warriors
Ross Rennie	Flanker	29 March 1986 (aged 25)	11	(Scotland) Edinburgh
Alasdair Strokosch	Flanker	21 February 1983 (aged 28)	23	(England) Gloucester
David Denton	Number 8	5 February 1990 (aged 21)	1	(Scotland) Edinburgh
Richie Vernon	Number 8	7 July 1987 (aged 24)	15	(England) Sale Sharks
Mike Blair	Scrum-half	20 April 1981 (aged 30)	75	(Scotland) Edinburgh
Chris Cusiter	Scrum-half	13 June 1982 (aged 29)	55	(Scotland) Glasgow Warriors
Rory Lawson	Scrum-half	12 March 1981 (aged 30)	30	(England) Gloucester
Greig Laidlaw	Scrum-half	12 October 1985 (aged 26)	2	(Scotland) Edinburgh
Ruaridh Jackson	Fly-half	12 February 1988 (aged 23)	11	(Scotland) Glasgow Warriors
Dan Parks	Fly-half	26 May 1978 (aged 33)	66	(Wales) Cardiff Blues
Duncan Weir	Fly-half	10 May 1991 (aged 20)	0	(Scotland) Glasgow Warriors
Joe Ansbro	Centre	29 October 1985 (aged 26)	9	(England) London Irish
Nick De Luca	Centre	1 February 1984 (aged 28)	29	(Scotland) Edinburgh
Graeme Morrison	Centre	17 October 1982 (aged 29)	32	(Scotland) Glasgow Warriors
Simon Danielli	Wing	8 September 1979 (aged 32)	32	(Ireland) Ulster
Max Evans	Wing	28 September 1983 (aged 28)	24	(France) Castres
Lee Jones	Wing	28 June 1988 (aged 23)	0	(Scotland) Edinburgh
Sean Lamont	Wing	15 January 1981 (aged 31)	60	(Wales) Scarlets
Stuart Hogg	Fullback	24 June 1992 (aged 19)	0	(Scotland) Glasgow Warriors
Rory Lamont	Fullback	10 October 1982 (aged 29)	26	(Scotland) Glasgow Warriors

== Wales ==
Warren Gatland named a 35-man squad for the 2012 Six Nations on 18 January.

Head coach: (New Zealand) Warren Gatland

Note: Flags indicate national union for the club/province as defined by World Rugby.

Player	Position	Date of birth (age)	Caps	Club/province
Huw Bennett	Hooker	11 June 1983 (aged 28)	49	(Wales) Ospreys
Ken Owens	Hooker	3 January 1987 (aged 25)	1	(Wales) Scarlets
Matthew Rees	Hooker	9 December 1980 (age 44)	48	(Wales) Scarlets
Ryan Bevington	Prop	9 December 1988 (aged 23)	7	(Wales) Ospreys
Gethin Jenkins	Prop	17 November 1980 (aged 31)	83	(Wales) Cardiff Blues
Adam Jones	Prop	8 March 1981 (aged 30)	75	(Wales) Ospreys
Craig Mitchell	Prop	3 May 1986 (aged 25)	11	(England) Exeter Chiefs
Paul James	Prop	13 May 1982 (aged 29)	31	(Wales) Ospreys
Rhodri Jones	Prop	23 December 1991 (aged 20)	0	(Wales) Scarlets
Rhys Gill	Prop	30 October 1986 (aged 25)	1	(England) Saracens
Bradley Davies	Lock	9 January 1987 (aged 25)	32	(Wales) Cardiff Blues
Ian Evans	Lock	4 October 1984 (aged 27)	17	(Wales) Ospreys
Ryan Jones	Lock	13 March 1981 (aged 30)	58	(Wales) Ospreys
Lou Reed	Lock	10 September 1987 (aged 24)	0	(Wales) Scarlets
Dan Lydiate	Flanker	18 December 1987 (aged 24)	20	(Wales) Newport Gwent Dragons
Justin Tipuric	Flanker	6 August 1989 (aged 22)	2	(Wales) Ospreys
Sam Warburton (c)	Flanker	5 October 1988 (aged 23)	24	(Wales) Cardiff Blues
Taulupe Faletau	Number 8	12 November 1990 (aged 21)	11	(Wales) Newport Gwent Dragons
Andy Powell	Number 8	23 August 1981 (aged 30)	22	(England) Sale Sharks
Mike Phillips	Scrum-half	29 August 1982 (aged 29)	60	(France) Bayonne
Rhys Webb	Scrum-half	9 December 1988 (aged 23)	0	(Wales) Ospreys
Lloyd Williams	Scrum-half	30 November 1989 (aged 22)	5	(Wales) Cardiff Blues
James Hook	Fly-half	27 June 1985 (aged 26)	59	(France) Perpignan
Rhys Priestland	Fly-half	9 January 1987 (aged 25)	9	(Wales) Scarlets
Ashley Beck	Centre	15 April 1990 (aged 21)	0	(Wales) Ospreys
Jonathan Davies	Centre	5 April 1988 (aged 23)	21	(Wales) Scarlets
Gavin Henson	Centre	1 February 1982 (aged 30)	33	(Wales) Cardiff Blues
Jamie Roberts	Centre	8 November 1986 (aged 25)	39	(Wales) Cardiff Blues
Scott Williams	Centre	10 October 1990 (aged 21)	8	(Wales) Scarlets
George North	Wing	13 April 1992 (aged 19)	16	(Wales) Scarlets
Alex Cuthbert	Wing	5 April 1990 (aged 21)	1	(Wales) Cardiff Blues
Harry Robinson	Wing	16 April 1993 (aged 18)	0	(Wales) Cardiff Blues
Lee Byrne	Fullback	1 June 1980 (aged 31)	46	(France) Clermont
Leigh Halfpenny	Fullback	22 December 1988 (aged 23)	27	(Wales) Cardiff Blues
Liam Williams	Fullback	9 April 1991 (aged 20)	0	(Wales) Scarlets
