= 2012 Six Nations Championship =

Rugby union tournament

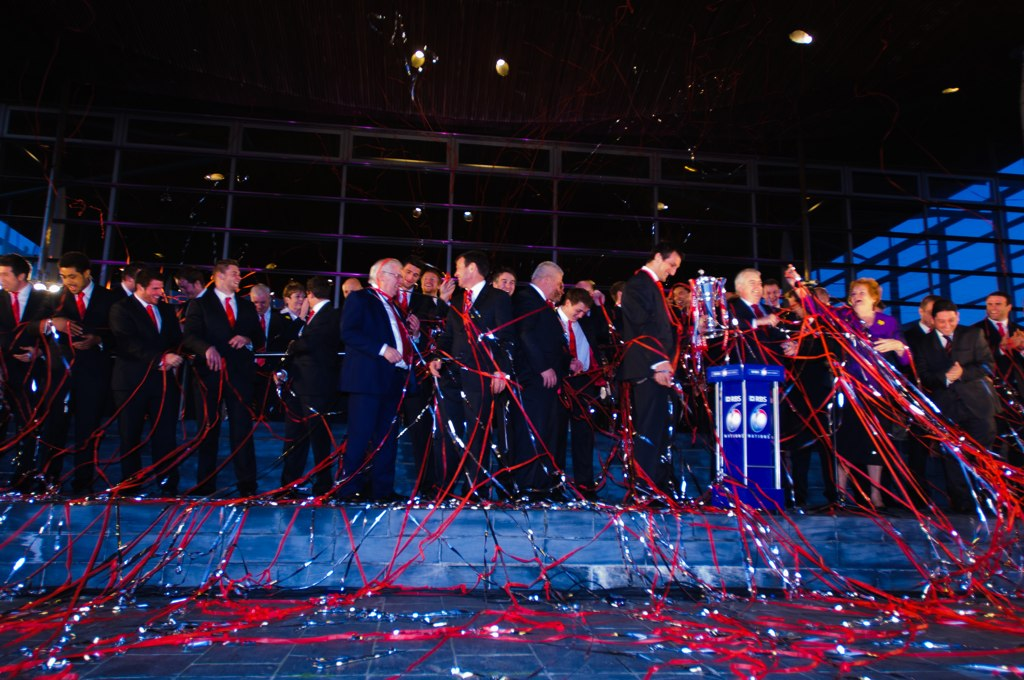
- Wales celebrate winning the 2012 Grand Slam at the Senedd
- Date: 4 February – 17 March 2012
- Countries: England; France; Ireland; Italy; Scotland; Wales

Tournament statistics
- Champions: Wales (25th title)
- Grand Slam: Wales (11th title)
- Triple Crown: Wales (20th title)
- Matches played: 15
- Attendance: 1,034,926 (68,995 per match)
- Tries scored: 46 (3.07 per match)
- Top point scorer: (Wales) Leigh Halfpenny (66)
- Top try scorer: (Ireland) Tommy Bowe (5)
- Player of the tournament: (Wales) Dan Lydiate
- Official website: Official website

The 2012 Six Nations Championship, known as the 2012 RBS 6 Nations due to the tournament's sponsorship by the Royal Bank of Scotland, was the 13th series of the Six Nations Championship. The annual northern hemisphere rugby union championship was contested by England, France, Ireland, Italy, Scotland and Wales.

Including the competition's previous incarnations as the Home Nations Championship and Five Nations Championship, it was the 118th tournament of the annual European championship.

For the first time since 2008, there were no Friday night fixtures.

Whilst Italy continued to play their home matches in Rome, they used the Stadio Olimpico instead of the Stadio Flaminio, which Italy had used for their home Championship fixtures since entering the competition in 2000. The Championship was won by Wales, who achieved their third Grand Slam in eight tournaments.

== Participants ==
Nation	Home stadium	City	Head coach	Captain
England	Twickenham Stadium	London	(England) Stuart Lancaster	Chris Robshaw
France	Stade de France	Saint-Denis	(France) Philippe Saint-André	Thierry Dusautoir
Ireland	Aviva Stadium	Dublin	(Ireland) Declan Kidney	Rory Best/Paul O'Connell
Italy	Stadio Olimpico	Rome	(France) Jacques Brunel	Sergio Parisse
Scotland	Murrayfield Stadium	Edinburgh	(England) Andy Robinson	Ross Ford
Wales	Millennium Stadium	Cardiff	(New Zealand) Warren Gatland	Sam Warburton

== Table ==
Pos	Team	Pld	W	D	L	PF	PA	PD	T	Pts
1	Wales	5	5	0	0	109	58	+51	10	10
2	England	5	4	0	1	98	71	+27	7	8
3	Ireland	5	2	1	2	121	94	+27	13	5
4	France	5	2	1	2	101	86	+15	8	5
5	Italy	5	1	0	4	53	121	−68	4	2
6	Scotland	5	0	0	5	56	108	−52	4	0

== Results ==
=== Round 1 ===
4 February 2012
15:30 CET (UTC+01)

France	30–12	Italy
Try: Rougerie 20' c Malzieu 34' m Clerc 53' c Fofana 71' m Con: Yachvili (2/3) 21', 54'; Pen: Yachvili (2/3) 11', 51'	Report	Pen: Burton (2/3) 29', 46'; Botes (1/1) 60'; Drop: Burton (1/2) 17'

Stade de France, Saint-Denis
Attendance: 79,563
Referee: Nigel Owens (Wales)

FB	15	Maxime Médard
RW	14	Vincent Clerc
OC	13	Aurélien Rougerie	(substituted off) 76'
IC	12	Wesley Fofana
LW	11	Julien Malzieu
FH	10	François Trinh-Duc	(substituted off) 76'
SH	9	Dimitri Yachvili	(substituted off) 62'
N8	8	Louis Picamoles	(substituted off) 64'
OF	7	Julien Bonnaire
BF	6	Thierry Dusautoir (c)
RL	5	Lionel Nallet	(substituted off) 50'
LL	4	Pascal Papé
TP	3	Nicolas Mas		(substituted off) 76'
HK	2	William Servat	(substituted off) 55'
LP	1	Vincent Debaty	(substituted off) 62'	(substituted in) 76'
Replacements:
HK	16	Dimitri Szarzewski	(substituted in) 55'
PR	17	Jean-Baptiste Poux	(substituted in) 62'
LK	18	Yoann Maestri	(substituted in) 50'
N8	19	Imanol Harinordoquy	(substituted in) 64'
SH	20	Morgan Parra	(substituted in) 62'
FH	21	Lionel Beauxis	(substituted in) 76'
CE	22	Maxime Mermoz	(substituted in) 76'
Coach:
(France) Philippe Saint-André

FB	15	Andrea Masi
RW	14	Giovanbattista Venditti
OC	13	Tommaso Benvenuti
IC	12	Alberto Sgarbi		(substituted off) 56'
LW	11	Luke McLean
FH	10	Kris Burton		(substituted off) 56'
SH	9	Edoardo Gori		(substituted off) 76'
N8	8	Sergio Parisse (c)
OF	7	Robert Barbieri		(substituted off) 67'
BF	6	Alessandro Zanni
RL	5	Quintin Geldenhuys	(yellow card) 70'
LL	4	Corniel van Zyl		(substituted off) 56'
TP	3	Martin Castrogiovanni
HK	2	Leonardo Ghiraldini		(substituted off) 75'
LP	1	Andrea Lo Cicero		(substituted off) 62'
Replacements:
HK	16	Tommaso D'Apice		(substituted in) 75'
PR	17	Lorenzo Cittadini		(substituted in) 62'
LK	18	Marco Bortolami		(substituted in) 56'
FL	19	Simone Favaro		(substituted in) 67'
SH	20	Fabio Semenzato		(substituted in) 76'
FH	21	Tobias Botes		(substituted in) 56'
CE	22	Gonzalo Canale		(substituted in) 56'
Coach:
(France) Jacques Brunel

Man of the Match:
Julien Malzieu (France)

Touch judges:
Andrew Small (England)
John Lacey (Ireland)
Television match official:
Graham Hughes (England)

- Nicolas Mas and Thierry Dusautoir (both France) earned their 50th caps.
- Wesley Fofana, Yoann Maestri (both France), Tobias Botes and Giovanbattista Venditti (both Italy) made their international debuts in this match.
- Vincent Clerc's try was the 32nd of his international career, placing him joint second with his coach Philippe Saint-André on the French try scoring list. (To this date, Serge Blanco remains the top French try scorer with 38.)

4 February 2012
17:00 GMT (UTC+0)

Scotland	6–13	England
Pen: Parks (2/2) 25', 32'	Report	Try: Hodgson 40' c Con: Farrell (1/1) 41'; Pen: Farrell (2/4) 22', 74'

Murrayfield Stadium, Edinburgh
Attendance: 67,144
Referee: George Clancy (Ireland)

FB	15	Rory Lamont
RW	14	Lee Jones
OC	13	Nick De Luca
IC	12	Sean Lamont
LW	11	Max Evans
FH	10	Dan Parks	(substituted off) 58'
SH	9	Chris Cusiter	(substituted off) 59'
N8	8	David Denton
OF	7	Ross Rennie
BF	6	Alasdair Strokosch	(substituted off) 59'
RL	5	Jim Hamilton	(substituted off) 59'
LL	4	Richie Gray
TP	3	Euan Murray	(substituted off) 74'
HK	2	Ross Ford (c)	(substituted off) 74'
LP	1	Allan Jacobsen
Replacements:
HK	16	Scott Lawson	(substituted in) 74'
PR	17	Geoff Cross	(substituted in) 74'
LK	18	Alastair Kellock	(substituted in) 59'
FL	19	John Barclay	(substituted in) 59'
SH	20	Mike Blair	(substituted in) 59'
FH	21	Greig Laidlaw	(substituted in) 58'
CE	22	Graeme Morrison
Coach:
(England) Andy Robinson

FB	15	Ben Foden
RW	14	Chris Ashton
OC	13	Brad Barritt	(substituted off) 71'
IC	12	Owen Farrell
LW	11	David Strettle
FH	10	Charlie Hodgson	(substituted off) 63'
SH	9	Ben Youngs	(substituted off) 64'
N8	8	Phil Dowson	(substituted off) 68'
OF	7	Chris Robshaw (c)
BF	6	Tom Croft
RL	5	Tom Palmer	(substituted off) 61'
LL	4	Mouritz Botha
TP	3	Dan Cole
HK	2	Dylan Hartley
LP	1	Alex Corbisiero	(substituted off) 64'
Replacements:
HK	16	Rob Webber
PR	17	Matt Stevens	(substituted in) 64'
LK	18	Geoff Parling	(substituted in) 61'
N8	19	Ben Morgan	(substituted in) 68'
SH	20	Lee Dickson	(substituted in) 64'
CE	21	Jordan Turner-Hall	(substituted in) 63'
FB	22	Mike Brown	(substituted in) 71'
Coach:
(England) Stuart Lancaster

Man of the Match:
David Denton (Scotland)

Touch judges:
Romain Poite (France)
Leighton Hodges (Wales)
Television match official:
Tony Redmond (Ireland)

- Brad Barritt, Lee Dickson, Phil Dowson, Owen Farrell, Ben Morgan, Geoff Parling, Jordan Turner-Hall (all England) and Lee Jones (Scotland) made their international debuts.
- Chris Robshaw of England captained his team earning only his second cap in this match.
- This match turned out to be Dan Parks's last appearance with the Scotland jersey as he announced his retirement from international rugby a few days after the game.

5 February 2012
15:00 IST (UTC+0)

Ireland	21–23	Wales
Try: Best 36' c Bowe 67' m Con: Sexton (1/2) 38'; Pen: Sexton (3/5) 3', 43', 59'	Report	Try: J. Davies (2) 13' m, 54' c North 75' m Con: Halfpenny (1/2) 55'; Pen: Halfpenny (2/2) 53', 79'

Aviva Stadium, Dublin
Attendance: 51,000
Referee: Wayne Barnes (England)

FB	15	Rob Kearney
RW	14	Tommy Bowe
OC	13	Fergus McFadden
IC	12	Gordon D'Arcy
LW	11	Andrew Trimble
FH	10	Johnny Sexton		(substituted off) 76'
SH	9	Conor Murray		(substituted off) 76'
N8	8	Jamie Heaslip
OF	7	Seán O'Brien
BF	6	Stephen Ferris	(yellow card) 79'
RL	5	Paul O'Connell (c)
LL	4	Donncha O'Callaghan		(substituted off) 63'
TP	3	Mike Ross
HK	2	Rory Best
LP	1	Cian Healy		(substituted off) 74'
Replacements:
HK	16	Seán Cronin
PR	17	Tom Court		(substituted in) 74'
LK	18	Donnacha Ryan		(substituted in) 63'
FL	19	Peter O'Mahony
SH	20	Eoin Reddan		(substituted in) 76'
FH	21	Ronan O'Gara		(substituted in) 76'
WG	22	David Kearney
Coach:
(Ireland) Declan Kidney

FB	15	Leigh Halfpenny
RW	14	Alex Cuthbert		(substituted off) 41'
OC	13	Jonathan Davies
IC	12	Jamie Roberts
LW	11	George North
FH	10	Rhys Priestland
SH	9	Mike Phillips
N8	8	Taulupe Faletau
OF	7	Sam Warburton (c)		(substituted off) 41'
BF	6	Ryan Jones
RL	5	Ian Evans
LL	4	Bradley Davies	(yellow card) 64'
TP	3	Adam Jones		(substituted off) 70'
HK	2	Huw Bennett
LP	1	Rhys Gill
Replacements:
HK	16	Ken Owens
PR	17	Paul James		(substituted in) 70'
N8	18	Andy Powell
FL	19	Justin Tipuric		(substituted in) 41'
SH	20	Lloyd Williams
FH	21	James Hook		(substituted in) 41'
CE	22	Scott Williams
Coach:
(New Zealand) Warren Gatland

Man of the Match:
Mike Phillips (Wales)

Touch judges:
Dave Pearson (England)
Stuart Terheege (England)
Television match official:
Geoff Warren (England)

- Huw Bennett (Wales) earned his 50th cap.
- Coming off the bench in the 76th minute to replace Johnny Sexton, Ronan O'Gara became the most capped Irish player with 117 caps, jointly with Brian O'Driscoll. O'Gara also took sole possession of the all-time lead for appearances in the Championship, with 57. He had previously been level with his countryman Mike Gibson, who made 56 appearances in the Five Nations between 1964 and 1979.

=== Round 2 ===
11 February 2012
17:00 CET (UTC+01)

Italy	15–19	England
Try: Venditti 37' m Benvenuti 40' c Con: Burton (1/2) 40'; Pen: Burton (1/1) 47'	Report	Try: Hodgson 50' c Con: Farrell (1/1) 50'; Pen: Farrell (4/4) 26', 35', 54', 65'

Stadio Olimpico, Rome
Attendance: 53,700
Referee: Jérôme Garcès (France)

FB	15	Andrea Masi
RW	14	Giovanbattista Venditti
OC	13	Tommaso Benvenuti
IC	12	Gonzalo Canale	(substituted off) 63'
LW	11	Luke McLean
FH	10	Kris Burton	(substituted off) 48'
SH	9	Edoardo Gori	(substituted off) 57'
N8	8	Sergio Parisse (c)
OF	7	Robert Barbieri	(substituted off) 76'
BF	6	Alessandro Zanni
RL	5	Quintin Geldenhuys	(substituted off) 57'
LL	4	Marco Bortolami
TP	3	Martin Castrogiovanni	(substituted off) 33'
HK	2	Leonardo Ghiraldini	(substituted off) 58'
LP	1	Andrea Lo Cicero
Replacements:
HK	16	Tommaso D'Apice	(substituted in) 58'
PR	17	Lorenzo Cittadini	(substituted in) 33'
LK	18	Antonio Pavanello	(substituted in) 57'
FL	19	Mauro Bergamasco	(substituted in) 76'
SH	20	Fabio Semenzato	(substituted in) 57'
FH	21	Tobias Botes	(substituted in) 48'
CE	22	Luca Morisi	(substituted in) 63'
Coach:
(France) Jacques Brunel

FB	15	Ben Foden
RW	14	Chris Ashton
OC	13	Brad Barritt
IC	12	Owen Farrell
LW	11	David Strettle
FH	10	Charlie Hodgson	(substituted off) 77'
SH	9	Ben Youngs	(substituted off) 51'
N8	8	Phil Dowson	(substituted off) 51'
OF	7	Chris Robshaw (c)
BF	6	Tom Croft
RL	5	Tom Palmer	(substituted off) 58'
LL	4	Mouritz Botha
TP	3	Dan Cole	(substituted off) 75'
HK	2	Dylan Hartley	(substituted off) 75'
LP	1	Alex Corbisiero
Replacements:
HK	16	Rob Webber	(substituted in) 75'
PR	17	Matt Stevens	(substituted in) 75'
LK	18	Geoff Parling	(substituted in) 58'
N8	19	Ben Morgan	(substituted in) 51'
SH	20	Lee Dickson	(substituted in) 51'
CE	21	Jordan Turner-Hall	(substituted in) 77'
FB	22	Mike Brown
Coach:
(England) Stuart Lancaster

Man of the Match:
Sergio Parisse (Italy)

Touch judges:
George Clancy (Ireland)
Neil Paterson (Scotland)
Television match official:
Tony Redmond (Ireland)

- Luca Morisi (Italy) and Rob Webber (England) made their international debuts.
- The four-point margin in this match is the joint-closest Italy have ever come to beating England.

11 February 2012
21:00 CET (UTC+01)

France	P–P	Ireland

Stade de France, Saint-Denis
Referee: Dave Pearson (England)

This match was postponed due to an unplayable pitch. It was the first weather-related postponement of a Five/Six Nations game since 1985. The match was rescheduled for 4 March.

12 February 2012
15:00 GMT (UTC+0)

Wales	27–13	Scotland
Try: Cuthbert 41' c Halfpenny (2) 50' c, 55' c Con: Halfpenny (3/3) 43', 52', 56'; Pen: Halfpenny (2/3) 29', 45'	Report	Try: Laidlaw 63' c Con: Laidlaw (1/1) 64'; Pen: Laidlaw (2/3) 22', 48'

Millennium Stadium, Cardiff
Attendance: 73,189
Referee: Romain Poite (France)

FB	15	Leigh Halfpenny
RW	14	Alex Cuthbert
OC	13	Jonathan Davies
IC	12	Jamie Roberts		(substituted off) 78'
LW	11	George North		(substituted off) 40'
FH	10	Rhys Priestland
SH	9	Mike Phillips		(substituted off) 75'
N8	8	Taulupe Faletau
OF	7	Aaron Shingler
BF	6	Dan Lydiate		(substituted off) 73'
RL	5	Ian Evans
LL	4	Ryan Jones (c)		(substituted off) 75'
TP	3	Adam Jones		(substituted off) 73'
HK	2	Huw Bennett		10' to 19'		(substituted off) 41'
LP	1	Gethin Jenkins	(yellow card) 78'
Replacements:
HK	16	Ken Owens		(substituted in) 10'	(substituted off) 19'	(substituted in) 41'
PR	17	Paul James		(substituted in) 73'
LK	18	Lou Reed		(substituted in) 75'
N8	19	Andy Powell		(substituted in) 73'
SH	20	Lloyd Williams		(substituted in) 75'
FH	21	James Hook		(substituted in) 40'
CE	22	Scott Williams		(substituted in) 78'
Coach:
(New Zealand) Warren Gatland

FB	15	Rory Lamont	(yellow card) 53'
RW	14	Lee Jones
OC	13	Nick De Luca	(yellow card) 45'
IC	12	Sean Lamont
LW	11	Max Evans		(substituted off) 16'
FH	10	Greig Laidlaw
SH	9	Chris Cusiter		(substituted off) 49'
N8	8	David Denton
OF	7	Ross Rennie
BF	6	Alasdair Strokosch		(substituted off) 44'
RL	5	Jim Hamilton		(substituted off) 58'
LL	4	Richie Gray
TP	3	Geoff Cross		(substituted off) 58'
HK	2	Ross Ford (c)		(substituted off) 72'
LP	1	Allan Jacobsen
Replacements:
HK	16	Scott Lawson		(substituted in) 72'
PR	17	Ed Kalman		(substituted in) 58'
LK	18	Alastair Kellock		(substituted in) 58'
FL	19	John Barclay		(substituted in) 44'
SH	20	Mike Blair		(substituted in) 49'
FH	21	Duncan Weir
FB	22	Stuart Hogg		(substituted in) 16'
Coach:
(England) Andy Robinson

Man of the Match:
Dan Lydiate (Wales)

Touch judges:
Peter Fitzgibbon (Ireland)
Simon McDowell (Ireland)
Television match official:
Giulio De Santis (Italy)

- Lou Reed, Aaron Shingler (both Wales), Stuart Hogg and Ed Kalman (both Scotland) made their international debuts.

=== Round 3 ===
25 February 2012
13:30 IST (UTC+0)

Ireland	42–10	Italy
Try: Earls 15' c Bowe (2) 38' c, 61' c Court 76' c Trimble 80' m Con: Sexton (4/5) 17', 39', 61', 78'; Pen: Sexton (3/3) 10', 48', 57'	Report	Try: Parisse 34' c Con: Botes (1/1) 35'; Pen: Botes (1/4) 7'

Aviva Stadium, Dublin
Attendance: 51,000
Referee: Craig Joubert (South Africa)

FB	15	Rob Kearney
RW	14	Tommy Bowe
OC	13	Keith Earls	(substituted off) 67'
IC	12	Gordon D'Arcy	(substituted off) 69'
LW	11	Andrew Trimble
FH	10	Johnny Sexton
SH	9	Conor Murray	(substituted off) 54'
N8	8	Jamie Heaslip
OF	7	Seán O'Brien	(substituted off) 58'
BF	6	Stephen Ferris
RL	5	Paul O'Connell (c)
LL	4	Donncha O'Callaghan	(substituted off) 58'
TP	3	Mike Ross
HK	2	Rory Best	(substituted off) 69'
LP	1	Cian Healy	(substituted off) 69'
Replacements:
HK	16	Seán Cronin	(substituted in) 69'
PR	17	Tom Court	(substituted in) 69'
LK	18	Donnacha Ryan	(substituted in) 58'
FL	19	Peter O'Mahony	(substituted in) 58'
SH	20	Eoin Reddan	(substituted in) 54'
FH	21	Ronan O'Gara	(substituted in) 69'
CE	22	Fergus McFadden	(substituted in) 67'
Coach:
(Ireland) Declan Kidney

FB	15	Andrea Masi
RW	14	Giovanbattista Venditti
OC	13	Tommaso Benvenuti
IC	12	Alberto Sgarbi	(substituted off) 63'
LW	11	Luke McLean
FH	10	Tobias Botes	(substituted off) 58'
SH	9	Edoardo Gori	(substituted off) 71'
N8	8	Sergio Parisse (c)
OF	7	Robert Barbieri	(substituted off) 63'
BF	6	Alessandro Zanni
RL	5	Marco Bortolami
LL	4	Quintin Geldenhuys	(substituted off) 58'
TP	3	Lorenzo Cittadini	(substituted off) 67'
HK	2	Leonardo Ghiraldini	(substituted off) 71'
LP	1	Michele Rizzo
Replacements:
HK	16	Tommaso D'Apice	(substituted in) 71'
PR	17	Fabio Staibano	(substituted in) 67'
LK	18	Antonio Pavanello	(substituted in) 58'
FL	19	Simone Favaro	(substituted in) 63'
SH	20	Fabio Semenzato	(substituted in) 71'
FH	21	Kris Burton	(substituted in) 58'
CE	22	Gonzalo Canale	(substituted in) 63'
Coach:
(France) Jacques Brunel

Man of the Match:
Johnny Sexton (Ireland)

Touch judges:
Nigel Owens (Wales)
David Changleng (Scotland)
Television match official:
Nigel Whitehouse (Wales)

- Peter O'Mahony (Ireland) made his international debut.
- Coming off the bench in the 69th minute to replace Gordon D'Arcy, Ronan O'Gara overtook Brian O'Driscoll as the most-capped Irish player with 118 caps.

25 February 2012
16:00 GMT (UTC+0)

England	12–19	Wales
Pen: Farrell (4/5) 23', 29', 38', 45'	Report	Try: S. Williams 75' c Con: Halfpenny (1/1) 76'; Pen: Halfpenny (4/5) 25', 34', 53', 71'

Twickenham Stadium, London
Attendance: 80,764
Referee: Steve Walsh (Australia) (Note: Although born in New Zealand, Walsh is registered with the Australian Rugby Union and therefore recognised as an Australian referee.)

FB	15	Ben Foden	(substituted off) 77'
RW	14	Chris Ashton
OC	13	Manu Tuilagi
IC	12	Brad Barritt
LW	11	David Strettle
FH	10	Owen Farrell	(substituted off) 65'
SH	9	Lee Dickson	(substituted off) 60'
N8	8	Ben Morgan	(substituted off) 72'
OF	7	Chris Robshaw (c)
BF	6	Tom Croft
RL	5	Geoff Parling
LL	4	Mouritz Botha	(substituted off) 60'
TP	3	Dan Cole
HK	2	Dylan Hartley	(substituted off) 72'
LP	1	Alex Corbisiero	(substituted off) 65'
Replacements:
HK	16	Rob Webber	(substituted in) 72'
PR	17	Matt Stevens	(substituted in) 65'
LK	18	Courtney Lawes	(substituted in) 60'
N8	19	Phil Dowson	(substituted in) 72'
SH	20	Ben Youngs	(substituted in) 60'
FH	21	Toby Flood	(substituted in) 65'
FB	22	Mike Brown	(substituted in) 77'
Coach:
(England) Stuart Lancaster

FB	15	Leigh Halfpenny
RW	14	Alex Cuthbert
OC	13	Jonathan Davies
IC	12	Jamie Roberts		(substituted off) 41'
LW	11	George North
FH	10	Rhys Priestland	(yellow card) 44'
SH	9	Mike Phillips
N8	8	Taulupe Faletau
OF	7	Sam Warburton (c)
BF	6	Dan Lydiate
RL	5	Ian Evans
LL	4	Alun Wyn Jones		(substituted off) 54'
TP	3	Adam Jones
HK	2	Ken Owens
LP	1	Gethin Jenkins
Replacements:
HK	16	Richard Hibbard
PR	17	Paul James
LK	18	Ryan Jones		(substituted in) 54'
FL	19	Justin Tipuric
SH	20	Lloyd Williams
FH	21	Stephen Jones
CE	22	Scott Williams		(substituted in) 41'
Coach:
(New Zealand) Warren Gatland

Man of the Match:
Sam Warburton (Wales)

Touch judges:
Peter Fitzgibbon (Ireland)
Pascal Gaüzère (France)
Television match official:
Iain Ramage (Scotland)

- Wales won their 20th Triple Crown.

26 February 2012
15:00 GMT (UTC+0)

Scotland	17–23	France
Try: Hogg 7' c Jones 55' c Con: Laidlaw (1/1) 9'; Weir (1/1) 56'; Pen: Laidlaw (1/2) 25'	Report	Try: Fofana 28' c Médard 58' c Con: Parra (2/2) 29', 59'; Pen: Parra (2/3) 39', 47'; Drop: Beauxis (1/1) 68'

Murrayfield Stadium, Edinburgh
Attendance: 67,200
Referee: Wayne Barnes (England)

FB	15	Stuart Hogg
RW	14	Rory Lamont	(substituted off) 30'
OC	13	Sean Lamont
IC	12	Graeme Morrison
LW	11	Lee Jones
FH	10	Greig Laidlaw	(substituted off) 48'
SH	9	Mike Blair	(substituted off) 30'
N8	8	David Denton	(substituted off) 52'
OF	7	Ross Rennie
BF	6	John Barclay
RL	5	Jim Hamilton	(substituted off) 69'
LL	4	Richie Gray
TP	3	Geoff Cross	(substituted off) 61'
HK	2	Ross Ford (c)	(substituted off) 68'
LP	1	Allan Jacobsen
Replacements:
HK	16	Scott Lawson	(substituted in) 68'
PR	17	Ed Kalman	(substituted in) 61'
LK	18	Alastair Kellock	(substituted in) 69'
N8	19	Richie Vernon	(substituted in) 52'
SH	20	Chris Cusiter	(substituted in) 30'
FH	21	Duncan Weir	(substituted in) 48'
CE	22	Nick De Luca	(substituted in) 30'
Coach:
(England) Andy Robinson

FB	15	Maxime Médard	(substituted off) 61'
RW	14	Vincent Clerc
OC	13	Aurélien Rougerie
IC	12	Wesley Fofana
LW	11	Julien Malzieu
FH	10	François Trinh-Duc
SH	9	Morgan Parra	(substituted off) 74'
N8	8	Louis Picamoles	(substituted off) 55'
OF	7	Imanol Harinordoquy
BF	6	Thierry Dusautoir (c)
RL	5	Yoann Maestri	(substituted off) 65'
LL	4	Pascal Papé
TP	3	Nicolas Mas
HK	2	Dimitri Szarzewski	(substituted off) 50'
LP	1	Jean-Baptiste Poux	(substituted off) 50'
Replacements:
HK	16	William Servat	(substituted in) 50'
PR	17	Vincent Debaty	(substituted in) 50'
LK	18	Lionel Nallet	(substituted in) 65'
FL	19	Julien Bonnaire	(substituted in) 55'
SH	20	Julien Dupuy	(substituted in) 74'
FH	21	Lionel Beauxis	(substituted in) 61'
CE	22	Maxime Mermoz
Coach:
(France) Philippe Saint-André

Man of the Match:
Ross Rennie (Scotland)

Touch judges:
Alain Rolland (Ireland)
Simon McDowell (Ireland)
Television match official:
Geoff Warren (England)

- Duncan Weir (Scotland) made his international debut.

=== Rescheduled match ===
4 March 2012 (Note: Rescheduled from 11 February 2012.)
16:00 CET (UTC+01)

France	17–17	Ireland
Try: Fofana 50' m Pen: Parra (4/5) 22', 29', 46', 57'	Report	Try: Bowe (2) 12' c, 37' c Con: Sexton (2/2) 13', 38'; Pen: Sexton (1/2) 25'

Stade de France, Saint-Denis
Attendance: 80,000
Referee: Dave Pearson (England)

FB	15	Clément Poitrenaud	(substituted off) 68'
RW	14	Vincent Clerc
OC	13	Aurélien Rougerie
IC	12	Wesley Fofana
LW	11	Julien Malzieu
FH	10	François Trinh-Duc
SH	9	Morgan Parra
N8	8	Imanol Harinordoquy
OF	7	Julien Bonnaire	(substituted off) 71'
BF	6	Thierry Dusautoir (c)
RL	5	Yoann Maestri
LL	4	Pascal Papé	(substituted off) 61'
TP	3	Nicolas Mas
HK	2	Dimitri Szarzewski	(substituted off) 53'
LP	1	Jean-Baptiste Poux	(substituted off) 53'
Replacements:
HK	16	William Servat	(substituted in) 53'
PR	17	Vincent Debaty	(substituted in) 53'
LK	18	Lionel Nallet	(substituted in) 61'
N8	19	Louis Picamoles	(substituted in) 71'
SH	20	Julien Dupuy
FH	21	Lionel Beauxis	(substituted in) 68'
CE	22	Maxime Mermoz
Coach:
(France) Philippe Saint-André

FB	15	Rob Kearney
RW	14	Tommy Bowe
OC	13	Keith Earls
IC	12	Gordon D'Arcy	(substituted off) 71'
LW	11	Andrew Trimble	(substituted off) 72'
FH	10	Johnny Sexton
SH	9	Conor Murray	(substituted off) 59'
N8	8	Jamie Heaslip
OF	7	Seán O'Brien	(substituted off) 66'
BF	6	Stephen Ferris
RL	5	Paul O'Connell (c)
LL	4	Donncha O'Callaghan	(substituted off) 58'
TP	3	Mike Ross
HK	2	Rory Best	(substituted off) 75'
LP	1	Cian Healy	(substituted off) 75'
Replacements:
HK	16	Seán Cronin	(substituted in) 75'
PR	17	Tom Court	(substituted in) 75'
LK	18	Donnacha Ryan	(substituted in) 58'
FL	19	Peter O'Mahony	(substituted in) 66'
SH	20	Eoin Reddan	(substituted in) 59'
FH	21	Ronan O'Gara	(substituted in) 71'
CE	22	Fergus McFadden	(substituted in) 72'
Coach:
(Ireland) Declan Kidney

Man of the Match:
Yoann Maestri (France)

Touch judges:
Wayne Barnes (England)
Andrew Small (England)
Television match official:
Geoff Warren (England)

=== Round 4 ===
10 March 2012
14:30 GMT (UTC+0)

Wales	24–3	Italy
Try: Roberts 59' c Cuthbert 77' m Con: Halfpenny (1/2) 50'; Pen: Halfpenny (3/3) 9', 19', 36'; Priestland (1/1) 69'	Report	Pen: Bergamasco (1/1) 12'

Millennium Stadium, Cardiff
Attendance: 73,892
Referee: George Clancy (Ireland)

FB	15	Leigh Halfpenny	(yellow card) 64'	(substituted off) 74'
RW	14	Alex Cuthbert
OC	13	Jonathan Davies		(substituted off) 69'
IC	12	Jamie Roberts
LW	11	George North
FH	10	Rhys Priestland
SH	9	Mike Phillips		(substituted off) 71'
N8	8	Taulupe Faletau		(substituted off) 66'
OF	7	Justin Tipuric
BF	6	Dan Lydiate
RL	5	Ian Evans
LL	4	Alun Wyn Jones		(substituted off) 62'
TP	3	Adam Jones		(substituted off) 70'
HK	2	Matthew Rees		(substituted off) 62'
LP	1	Gethin Jenkins (c)
Replacements:
HK	16	Ken Owens		(substituted in) 62'
PR	17	Paul James		(substituted in) 70'
LK	18	Luke Charteris		(substituted in) 62'
FL	19	Ryan Jones		(substituted in) 66'
SH	20	Rhys Webb		(substituted in) 71'
FH	21	James Hook		(substituted in) 74'
CE	22	Scott Williams		(substituted in) 69'
Coach:
(New Zealand) Warren Gatland

FB	15	Andrea Masi	(substituted off) 70'
RW	14	Mirco Bergamasco
OC	13	Gonzalo Canale	(substituted off) 66'
IC	12	Alberto Sgarbi
LW	11	Luke McLean
FH	10	Kris Burton
SH	9	Fabio Semenzato	(substituted off) 66'
N8	8	Sergio Parisse (c)
OF	7	Simone Favaro	(substituted off) 63'
BF	6	Alessandro Zanni
RL	5	Corniel van Zyl	(substituted off) 51'
LL	4	Quintin Geldenhuys
TP	3	Lorenzo Cittadini	(substituted off) 51'	(substituted in) 72'
HK	2	Leonardo Ghiraldini	(substituted off) 54'
LP	1	Andrea Lo Cicero		(substituted off) 72'
Replacements:
HK	16	Tommaso D'Apice	(substituted in) 54'
PR	17	Fabio Staibano	(substituted in) 51'
PR	18	Marco Bortolami	(substituted in) 51'
LK	19	Robert Barbieri	(substituted in) 63'
SH	20	Tobias Botes	(substituted in) 66'
CE	21	Tommaso Benvenuti	(substituted in) 66'
WG	22	Giulio Toniolatti	(substituted in) 70'
Coach:
(France) Jacques Brunel

Man of the Match:
Alex Cuthbert (Wales)

Touch judges:
Peter Fitzgibbon (Ireland)
Peter Gauzere (Scotland)
Television match official:
Geoff Hughes (England)

- Rhys Webb (Wales) and Fabio Staibano (Italy) made their international debuts.

10 March 2012
17:00 IST (UTC+0)

Ireland	32–14	Scotland
Try: Best 13' c Reddan 33' c Trimble 40' m McFadden 76' c Con: Sexton (3/4) 14', 34', 77'; Pen: Sexton (2/2) 25', 71'	Report	Try: Gray 36' m Pen: Laidlaw (3/3) 3', 9', 31'

Aviva Stadium, Dublin
Attendance: 51,000
Referee: Chris Pollock (New Zealand)

FB	15	Rob Kearney	(substituted off) 74'
RW	14	Tommy Bowe
OC	13	Keith Earls
IC	12	Gordon D'Arcy	(substituted off) 54'
LW	11	Andrew Trimble
FH	10	Johnny Sexton
SH	9	Eoin Reddan	(substituted off) 54'
N8	8	Jamie Heaslip
OF	7	Peter O'Mahony	(substituted off) 62'
BF	6	Stephen Ferris
RL	5	Donnacha Ryan
LL	4	Donncha O'Callaghan	(substituted off) 78'
TP	3	Mike Ross			(substituted off) 78'
HK	2	Rory Best (c)	(substituted off) 54'
LP	1	Cian Healy	51' to 58'
Replacements:
HK	16	Seán Cronin	(substituted in) 54'
PR	17	Tom Court	(substituted in) 51'	(substituted off) 58'	(substituted in) 78'
LK	18	Mike McCarthy	(substituted in) 78'
FL	19	Shane Jennings	(substituted in) 62'
SH	20	Tomás O'Leary	(substituted in) 54'
FH	21	Ronan O'Gara	(substituted in) 54'
CE	22	Fergus McFadden	(substituted in) 74'
Coach:
(Ireland) Declan Kidney

FB	15	Stuart Hogg
RW	14	Lee Jones		(substituted off) 62'
OC	13	Max Evans	(yellow card) 73'
IC	12	Graeme Morrison
LW	11	Sean Lamont
FH	10	Greig Laidlaw		(substituted off) 56'
SH	9	Mike Blair		(substituted off) 50'
N8	8	David Denton
OF	7	Ross Rennie		(substituted off) 58'
BF	6	John Barclay
RL	5	Jim Hamilton		(substituted off) 59'
LL	4	Richie Gray
TP	3	Geoff Cross		(substituted off) 46'
HK	2	Ross Ford (c)
LP	1	Allan Jacobsen
Replacements:
HK	16	Scott Lawson
PR	17	Euan Murray		(substituted in) 46'
PR	18	Alastair Kellock		(substituted in) 59'
LK	19	Richie Vernon		(substituted in) 58'
FL	20	Chris Cusiter		(substituted in) 50'
FH	21	Ruaridh Jackson		(substituted in) 56'
CE	22	Matt Scott		(substituted in) 62'
Coach:
(England) Andy Robinson

Man of the Match:
Donncha O'Callaghan (Ireland)

Touch judges:
Romain Poite (France)
Greg Garner (England)
Television match official:
Giulio De Santis (Italy)

- Matt Scott (Scotland) made his international debut.

11 March 2012
16:00 CET (UTC+01)

France	22–24	England
Try: Fofana 74' c Con: Parra (1/1) 75'; Pen: Beauxis (3/4) 16', 39', 68'; Dupuy (1/2) 32'; Parra (1/1) 64'	Report	Try: Tuilagi 12' c Foden 17' c Croft 70' c Con: Farrell (3/3) 14', 18', 71'; Pen: Farrell (1/2) 49'

Stade de France, Saint-Denis
Attendance: 80,895
Referee: Alain Rolland (Ireland)

FB	15	Clément Poitrenaud
RW	14	Vincent Clerc	(substituted off) 37'
OC	13	Aurélien Rougerie
IC	12	Wesley Fofana
LW	11	Julien Malzieu
FH	10	Lionel Beauxis	(substituted off) 74'
SH	9	Julien Dupuy	(substituted off) 50'
N8	8	Imanol Harinordoquy
OF	7	Julien Bonnaire	(substituted off) 69'
BF	6	Thierry Dusautoir (c)
RL	5	Yoann Maestri	(substituted off) 55'
LL	4	Pascal Papé
TP	3	Nicolas Mas		(substituted off) 75'
HK	2	Dimitri Szarzewski	(substituted off) 50'
LP	1	Jean-Baptiste Poux	(substituted off) 65'	(substituted in) 75'
Replacements:
HK	16	William Servat	(substituted in) 50'
PR	17	Vincent Debaty	(substituted in) 65'
LK	18	Lionel Nallet	(substituted in) 55'
N8	19	Louis Picamoles	(substituted in) 69'
SH	20	Morgan Parra	(substituted in) 50'
FH	21	François Trinh-Duc	(substituted in) 74'
CE	22	Maxime Mermoz	(substituted in) 37'
Coach:
(France) Philippe Saint-André

FB	15	Ben Foden
RW	14	Chris Ashton
OC	13	Manu Tuilagi
IC	12	Brad Barritt
LW	11	Charlie Sharples	(yellow card) 52'
FH	10	Owen Farrell
SH	9	Lee Dickson		(substituted off) 71'
N8	8	Ben Morgan		(substituted off) 63'
OF	7	Chris Robshaw (c)
BF	6	Tom Croft
RL	5	Geoff Parling
LL	4	Mouritz Botha		(substituted off) 56'
TP	3	Dan Cole		(substituted off) 69'
HK	2	Dylan Hartley
LP	1	Alex Corbisiero
Replacements:
HK	16	Rob Webber			(substituted in) 74'
PR	17	Matt Stevens		(substituted in) 69'
LK	18	Tom Palmer		(substituted in) 56'
FL	19	Phil Dowson		(substituted in) 63'	(substituted off) 74'
SH	20	Ben Youngs		(substituted in) 71'
FH	21	Charlie Hodgson
FB	22	Mike Brown
Coach:
(England) Stuart Lancaster

Man of the Match:
Imanol Harinordoquy (France)

Touch judges:
Nigel Owens (Wales)
John Lacey (Ireland)
Television match official:
Jim Yuille (Scotland)

=== Round 5 ===
17 March 2012
13:30 CET (UTC+01)

Italy	13–6	Scotland
Try: Venditti 42' c Con: Burton (1/1) 43'; Pen: Bergamasco (1/3) 10'; Drop: Burton (1/2) 76'	Report	Pen: Laidlaw (2/3) 35', 59'

Stadio Olimpico, Rome
Attendance: 72,354
Referee: Alain Rolland (Ireland)

FB	15	Andrea Masi
RW	14	Giovanbattista Venditti
OC	13	Tommaso Benvenuti
IC	12	Gonzalo Canale		(substituted off) 70'
LW	11	Mirco Bergamasco
FH	10	Kris Burton
SH	9	Edoardo Gori		(substituted off) 67'
N8	8	Sergio Parisse (c)
OF	7	Robert Barbieri		(substituted off) 57'
BF	6	Alessandro Zanni	(yellow card) 66'
RL	5	Marco Bortolami
LL	4	Quintin Geldenhuys		(substituted off) 76'
TP	3	Martin Castrogiovanni			(substituted off) 67'
HK	2	Fabio Ongaro		(substituted off) 57'
LP	1	Andrea Lo Cicero		(substituted off) 52'	(substituted in) 67'
Replacements:
HK	16	Tommaso D'Apice		(substituted in) 57'
PR	17	Lorenzo Cittadini		(substituted in) 52'
LK	18	Joshua Furno		(substituted in) 76'
FL	19	Simone Favaro			(substituted in) 76'
N8	20	Manoa Vosawai		(substituted in) 57'
FH	21	Tobias Botes		(substituted in) 67'	(substituted off) 76'
WG	22	Giulio Toniolatti		(substituted in) 70'
Coach:
(France) Jacques Brunel

FB	15	Stuart Hogg
RW	14	Max Evans
OC	13	Nick De Luca	(yellow card) 39'
IC	12	Graeme Morrison
LW	11	Sean Lamont
FH	10	Greig Laidlaw		(substituted off) 70'
SH	9	Mike Blair
N8	8	David Denton
OF	7	Ross Rennie
BF	6	John Barclay		(substituted off) 70'
RL	5	Jim Hamilton	(yellow card) 54'
LL	4	Richie Gray		(substituted off) 55'
TP	3	Geoff Cross		(substituted off) 50'
HK	2	Ross Ford (c)
LP	1	Jon Welsh
Replacements:
HK	16	Scott Lawson
PR	17	Euan Murray		(substituted in) 50'
LK	18	Alastair Kellock		(substituted in) 55'
N8	19	Richie Vernon		(substituted in) 70'
SH	20	Chris Cusiter
FH	21	Ruaridh Jackson		(substituted in) 70'
WG	22	Jack Cuthbert
Coach:
(England) Andy Robinson

Man of the Match:
Martín Castrogiovanni (Italy)

Touch judges:
George Clancy (Ireland)
Pascal Gaüzère (France)
Television match official:
Tony Redmond (Ireland)

- Scotland were whitewashed. This was the first time since 2007 that Italy avoided the wooden spoon.
- Italy's starting pack in this match was the most capped ever to play an international match.

17 March 2012
14:45 GMT (UTC+0)

Wales	16–9	France
Try: Cuthbert 20' c Con: Halfpenny (1/1) 21', Pen: Halfpenny (3/4) 32', 52', 75'	Report	Pen: Yachvili (2/2) 10', 72'; Beauxis (1/1) 44'

Millennium Stadium, Cardiff
Attendance: 72,658
Referee: Craig Joubert (South Africa)

FB	15	Leigh Halfpenny
RW	14	Alex Cuthbert
OC	13	Jonathan Davies
IC	12	Jamie Roberts
LW	11	George North
FH	10	Rhys Priestland
SH	9	Mike Phillips	(substituted off) 64'
N8	8	Taulupe Faletau
OF	7	Sam Warburton (c)	(substituted off) 41'
BF	6	Dan Lydiate
RL	5	Ian Evans
LL	4	Alun Wyn Jones	(substituted off) 64'
TP	3	Adam Jones
HK	2	Matthew Rees	(substituted off) 64'
LP	1	Gethin Jenkins
Replacements:
HK	16	Ken Owens	(substituted in) 64'
PR	17	Paul James
LK	18	Luke Charteris	(substituted in) 64'
FL	19	Ryan Jones	(substituted in) 41'
SH	20	Lloyd Williams	(substituted in) 64'
FH	21	James Hook
CE	22	Scott Williams
Coach:
(New Zealand) Warren Gatland

FB	15	Clément Poitrenaud	(substituted off) 36'
RW	14	Wesley Fofana
OC	13	Aurélien Rougerie
IC	12	Florian Fritz
LW	11	Alexis Palisson	(substituted off) 54'
FH	10	Lionel Beauxis	(substituted off) 72'
SH	9	Dimitri Yachvili
N8	8	Imanol Harinordoquy
OF	7	Julien Bonnaire	(substituted off) 60'
BF	6	Thierry Dusautoir (c)
RL	5	Yoann Maestri
LL	4	Pascal Papé	(substituted off) 68'
TP	3	David Attoub
HK	2	William Servat	(substituted off) 45'
LP	1	Jean-Baptiste Poux	(substituted off) 45'
Replacements:
HK	16	Dimitri Szarzewski	(substituted in) 45'
PR	17	Vincent Debaty	(substituted in) 45'
LK	18	Julien Pierre	(substituted in) 68'
N8	19	Louis Picamoles	(substituted in) 60'
SH	20	Morgan Parra	(substituted in) 72'
FH	21	François Trinh-Duc	(substituted in) 54'
WG	22	Jean-Marcellin Buttin	(substituted in) 36'
Coach:
(France) Philippe Saint-André

Man of the Match:
Dan Lydiate (Wales)

Touch judges:
Wayne Barnes (England)
Stuart Terheege (England)
Television match official:
Iain Ramage (Scotland)

- Matthew Rees (Wales) earned his 50th cap.
- Jean-Marcellin Buttin (France) made his international debut.
- William Servat and Julien Bonnaire (both France) played their final matches.
- Wales won the Grand Slam.

17 March 2012
17:00 GMT (UTC+0)

England	30–9	Ireland
Try: Penalty try 58' c Youngs 73' m Con: Farrell (1/2) 58'; Pen: Farrell (6/6) 2', 23', 34', 48', 64', 77'	Report	Pen: Sexton (3/3) 15', 40', 51'

Twickenham Stadium, London
Attendance: 80,567
Referee: Nigel Owens (Wales)

FB	15	Ben Foden	(substituted off) 71'
RW	14	Chris Ashton
OC	13	Manu Tuilagi
IC	12	Brad Barritt
LW	11	David Strettle
FH	10	Owen Farrell
SH	9	Lee Dickson	(substituted off) 49'
N8	8	Ben Morgan	(substituted off) 75'
OF	7	Chris Robshaw (c)
BF	6	Tom Croft
RL	5	Geoff Parling
LL	4	Mouritz Botha	(substituted off) 56'
TP	3	Dan Cole	(substituted off) 75'
HK	2	Dylan Hartley	(substituted off) 75'
LP	1	Alex Corbisiero
Replacements:
HK	16	Lee Mears	(substituted in) 75'
PR	17	Matt Stevens	(substituted in) 75'
LK	18	Tom Palmer	(substituted in) 56'
FL	19	Phil Dowson	(substituted in) 75'
SH	20	Ben Youngs	(substituted in) 49'
FH	21	Charlie Hodgson
CE	22	Mike Brown	(substituted in) 71'
Coach:
(England) Stuart Lancaster

FB	15	Rob Kearney
RW	14	Tommy Bowe
OC	13	Keith Earls
IC	12	Gordon D'Arcy	(substituted off) 49'
LW	11	Andrew Trimble	(substituted off) 75'
FH	10	Johnny Sexton
SH	9	Eoin Reddan	(substituted off) 49'
N8	8	Jamie Heaslip
OF	7	Seán O'Brien	(substituted off) 70'
BF	6	Stephen Ferris
RL	5	Donnacha Ryan
LL	4	Donncha O'Callaghan	(substituted off) 67'
TP	3	Mike Ross	(substituted off) 37'
HK	2	Rory Best (c)	(substituted off) 75'
LP	1	Cian Healy
Replacements:
HK	16	Seán Cronin	(substituted in) 75'
PR	17	Tom Court	(substituted in) 37'
LK	18	Mike McCarthy	(substituted in) 67'
FL	19	Peter O'Mahony	(substituted in) 70'
SH	20	Tomás O'Leary	(substituted in) 49'
FH	21	Ronan O'Gara	(substituted in) 49'
WG	22	Fergus McFadden	(substituted in) 75'
Coach:
(Ireland) Declan Kidney

Man of the Match:
Ben Morgan (England)

Touch judges:
Jérôme Garces (France)
Neil Paterson (Scotland)
Television match official:
Jim Yuille (Scotland)

== Media coverage ==
In the United Kingdom, all the matches were televised on BBC channels. In Ireland, RTÉ Two and RTÉ Two HD televised all the matches live. S4C televised Wales matches while French international channel TV5Monde televised only France matches and was available internationally (including the United States, where BBC America and BBC America HD also televised some matches).
