= Wesley Fofana =

Wesley Fofana may refer to:

- Wesley Fofana (rugby union) (born 1988), French rugby union footballer
- Wesley Fofana (footballer) (born 2000), French footballer
