= Ruggero Trevisan =

- Born: 12 March 1990 (age 36) Latisana, Italy
- Height: 1.80 m (5 ft 11 in)
- Weight: 89 kg (196 lb)

Rugby union career
- Position: Fullback
Senior career
Years	Team	Apps	(Points)
2010-2011	Crociati	22	(18)
2011-2012	Aironi	13	(0)
2012-2014	Zebre	32	(10)
2014-2015	Treviso	2	(0)
International career
Years	Team	Apps	(Points)
2009-2010	Italy Under 20	13	(10)
2011−2013	Emerging Italy	4	(0)
- Correct as of 8 June 2013

Ruggero Trevisan (born 12 March 1990) is a former Italian rugby union player who played as a fullback.

After Aironi collapsed because of financial problems, Trevisan moved to the Italian franchise Zebre, along with many of the Aironi team.
