= Aironi =

Former Italian rugby union club, based in Viadana, Lombardy

- Founded: 2010
- Disbanded: 2012; 14 years ago
- Location: Lombardy & Emilia-Romagna, Italy
- Ground(s): Stadio Luigi Zaffanella, Viadana (Capacity: 6,000)
- Coach(es): Rowland Phillips (Head Coach); Andrea Moretti (Forwards); Antonio Zanichelli (Backs); Andrew Scotney (Backs)
- Captain: Quintin Geldenhuys
- League: Pro12
- 2011–12: 12th
Team kit

Aironi Rugby (Italian pronunciation: [aiˈroni], "herons") was an Italian professional rugby union team competing in the Pro12 and the Heineken Cup, representing the Italian regions of Lombardy and Emilia-Romagna. It lost its status as a regional side at the end of the 2011–12 season, as the Italian Rugby Federation revoked its licence for financial reasons. They were replaced by Zebre from the 2012–13 season.

== Home ground ==
The team played in Viadana at Stadio Luigi Zaffanella. It was expected that Reggio Emilia's Stadio Giglio would be used for larger games but no games required its near 30,000 capacity.

== Kit ==
The team's primary kit was all black with a silver stripe. Their alternative kit was white with a silver stripe. In the Heineken Cup the players wore an all green kit. Their kit was supplied by Adidas.

== Member clubs ==
The formation of the team was made possible by the co-operation of eight existing rugby clubs Rugby Viadana 54%, Colorno 15%, Gran Parma Rugby 10%, Rugby Parma 10%, Noceto 5%, Reggio Emilia 2%, Modena 2% and Mantova 2%. Gran Parma, Rugby Viadana and Colorno have merged as a result of the formation of Aironi to form GranDucato Rugby Parma. Rugby Parma and Noceto have merged to form Crociati (Crusaders) Rugby Parma. These mergers were essential as the Super 10 (now Top12) division would have attracted far less sponsorship.

== History ==
After several failed attempts, there was doubt that a deal for Italian entry into the Celtic League would be completed in time for the 2010–11 season, with the Scots delaying support for entry until changes were made to the Celtic League management structure. In February 2010 it was announced that the planned expansion of the Celtic League was to be put on hold. The reasons were the insistence by existing members that the Italian teams could be ejected after three years. Also the financial demands the league placed on the Italians could not be met. The existing teams said this was to cover the need to have larger squads to cover the extra fixtures and additional travel expenses. Agreement was reached in early March 2010 to allow Italian teams entry to the Celtic League in time for the 2010–11 season. The clubs would also be guaranteed places annually into the Heineken Cup that had previously been awarded to the two top teams in the National Championship of Excellence.

Italy had failed to make an impact in the Six Nations Championship tournament since joining 10 years earlier. This was largely blamed on the fact their best players did not have a competitive enough domestic tournament or were forced to play abroad. The fact that the Six Nations decider in 2009 between Wales and Ireland featured 42 Celtic League players out of 44 in their squads supported this notion. Most Italian players played in France's Top 14. In order to ensure the new teams delivered players for the national side the Federazione Italiana Rugby put incentives in place for the new teams. The successful franchises would receive financial support from the FIR to recruit national team players at the time playing abroad and fresh home-grown talent. Signing one of Italy's top players, most of whom play abroad, would net clubs €50,000, while other lesser players, mostly plying their trade in the Italian Super 10 series (Italy's top flight league at the time), would scoop €30,000 and €20,000 bonuses.

It was proposed initially that Aironi would join along with a new team Praetorians Roma, but Benetton Treviso were nominated instead of Roma. Treviso and Duchi Nord-Ovest could not agree to form one club to represent the Veneto region and lost out in the first round of bidding despite the region being the traditional home of Italian rugby. However Roma failed to satisfy the evaluators of their financial muscle and Treviso were nominated in their stead. This was boosted by Treviso's defeat of USA Perpignan in the Heineken Cup. Roma were to be based at the Stadio Flaminio in Rome, where Six Nations matches had been staged.

== 2010–11 Debut Season ==
Aironi had a very difficult debut season. They initially struggled to compete in the Celtic League. Their coach, Franco Bernini, was sacked in November after a run of disappointing losses. They suffered a number of heavy defeats but often when they did lose (particularly at home) they did so by a single score. This is evidenced by the 8 Losing Bonus points received in 22 games. They finally registered their first win against French team Biarritz in December in the Heineken Cup. This was a massive shock as Biarritz had contested the previous year's final. Their first Celtic League win came at home against Connacht on 26 March, which they won 25–13. They finished bottom of the league in 12th.

=== Magners League ===
	Team	Pld	W	D	L	PF	PA	PD	TF	TA	Try bonus	Losing bonus	Pts
1	(Ireland) Munster	22	19	0	3	496	327	+169	44	22	5	2	83
2	(Ireland) Leinster	22	15	1	6	495	336	+159	50	25	5	3	70
3	(Ireland) Ulster	22	15	1	6	480	418	+62	44	35	3	2	67
4	(Wales) Ospreys	22	12	1	9	553	418	+135	56	29	6	7	63
5	(Wales) Scarlets	22	12	1	9	503	453	+50	49	43	5	7	62
6	(Wales) Cardiff Blues	22	13	1	8	479	392	+87	37	33	3	3	60
7	(Wales) Newport Gwent Dragons	22	10	1	11	444	462	−18	47	49	3	4	49
8	(Scotland) Edinburgh	22	9	0	13	421	460	−39	39	44	2	5	43
9	(Ireland) Connacht	22	7	1	14	394	459	−65	32	44	3	6	39
10	(Italy) Benetton Treviso	22	9	0	13	374	502	−128	29	58	0	2	38
11	(Scotland) Glasgow Warriors	22	6	1	15	401	543	−142	33	48	1	6	33
12	(Italy) Aironi	22	1	0	21	247	517	−270	21	52	0	8	12
Correct as of 7 May 2011

4 September 2010
19:30

(1 BP) Munster (Ireland)	33–17	(Italy) Aironi
	Report

Musgrave Park
Attendance: 8,426
Referee: Graham Knox

11 September 2010
19:05

(1 BP) Aironi (Italy)	15–22	(Ireland) Ulster
	Report

Stadio Luigi Zaffanella
Attendance: 4,453
Referee: Stefano Penne

17 September 2010
20:05

(1 BP) Scarlets (Wales)	49–10	(Italy) Aironi
	Report

Parc y Scarlets
Attendance: 6,123
Referee: John Lacey

25 September 2010
18:30

(1 BP) Ospreys (Wales)	38–6	(Italy) Aironi
	Report

Liberty Stadium
Attendance: 7,289
Referee: Andy Macpherson

2 October 2010
19:05

(1 BP) Aironi (Italy)	9–10	(Scotland) Edinburgh
	Report

Stadio Zaffanella
Attendance: 4,053

23 October 2010
18:30

Newport Gwent Dragons (Wales)	36–5	(Italy) Aironi
	Report

Rodney Parade
Attendance: 5,033
Referee: Andrew McMenemy

29 October 2010
19:05

Aironi (Italy)	3–20	(Wales) Cardiff Blues
	Report

Stadio Zaffanella
Attendance: 2,900
Referee: Graham Knox

5 November 2010
19:30

Glasgow Warriors (Scotland)	33–8	(Italy) Aironi
	Report

Firhill Stadium
Attendance: 2,078

27 November 2010
19:05

Aironi (Italy)	17–34	(Wales) Scarlets (1 BP)
	Report

Stadio Zaffanella
Attendance: 2,000
Referee: Andy MacPherson

3 December 2010
19:00

Connacht (Ireland)	P – P	(Italy) Aironi

Sportsground

24 December 2010
14:30

Benetton Treviso (Italy)	15–10	(Italy) Aironi
	Report

Stadio di Monigo
Attendance: 3,500
Referee: Carlo Damasco

=== 2010–11 Heineken Cup pool stage – Pool 4 ===
Team	P	W	D	L	Tries for	Tries against	Try diff	Points for	Points against	Points diff	TB	LB	Pts
(France) Biarritz (4)	6	4	0	2	16	9	+7	140	86	+55	4	2	22
(Ireland) Ulster (8)	6	5	0	1	15	8	+7	145	93	+52	2	0	22
(England) Bath	6	2	0	4	20	8	+12	147	108	+39	3	3	14
(Italy) Aironi	6	1	0	5	4	30	−26	65	211	−146	0	0	4

8 October 2010
19:30

Ulster (Ireland)	30–6	(Italy) Aironi
Try: Trimble 21' m Humphreys 44' m Danielli 60' c Pienaar 67' c Con: Pienaar (0/2); Humphreys (2/2); Pen: Pienaar (2/3) 2', 39'	Report	Pen: Mercier (2/3) 5', 17'

Ravenhill, Belfast
Attendance: 7,777
Referee: Chris White (England)

16 October 2010
14:30

Aironi (Italy)	6–22	(England) Bath
Pen: Mercier (2/2) 21', 54'	Report	Try: Biggs 12' m Carraro 23' m Abendanon 36' c Watson 67' m Con: Barkley (1/4)

Stadio Luigi Zaffanella, Viadana
Attendance: 4,000
Referee: John Lacey (Ireland)

11 December 2010
14:30

Aironi (Italy)	28–27	(France) Biarritz Olympique
Try: Marshall 38' m Toniolatti 48' c Pratichetti 63' c Con: Tebaldi (2/3); Pen: Tebaldi (2) 3', 31'; Drop: J. Laharrague 78'	Report	Try: Terrain 7' m Ngwenya 16' c Balshaw 42' m Gimenez 58' c Con: Yachvili (2/4); Pen: Yachvili 73'

Stadio Luigi Zaffanella
Attendance: 3,000
Referee: Peter Fitzgibbon (Ireland)

17 December 2010
19:00

Biarritz Olympique (France)	34–3	(Italy) Aironi
Try: Bosch 10' c Penalty try 22' c Ngwenya 46' c August 56' c Con: Yachvili (4/4); Pen: Yachvili (2/2) 2', 16'	Report	Pen: Bocchino (1/2) 60'

Parc des Sports Aguiléra
Attendance: 6,816
Referee: Andrew Small (England)

15 January 2011
14:30

Bath (England)	55–16	(Italy) Aironi
Try: Biggs (2) 9' m, 27' c Watson (2) 20' c, 77' c Banahan (4) 29' c, 53' c, 58' c, 70' m Con: Barkley (6/8); Pen: Barkley (1/1) 2'	Report	Try: Sole 36' c Con: Marshall (1/1); Pen: Marshall (3/3) 4', 14', 49'

The Recreation Ground
Attendance: 10,000
Referee: Neil Paterson (Scotland)

22 January 2011
14:30

Aironi (Italy)	6–43	(Ireland) Ulster
Pen: Tebaldi 37'; Drop: Marshall 26'	Report	Try: Trimble 23' c Wannenburg (2) 41' c, 46' c Penalty try 57' c Henry 67' c Danielli 78' m Con: Humphreys (5/6); Pen: Humphreys (1/2) 3'

Stadio Luigi Zaffanella
Attendance: 3,000
Referee: Christophe Berdos (France)

== 2011–12 Final Season ==
Aironi transfers 2011–12
Pos	Out	In
PR	(substituted off) (Argentina) Ulyses Gamboa (released – joined (Scotland) Edinburgh)	
HK	(substituted off) (Italy) Luigi Ferraro (joined (Italy) Rugby Calvisano)	(substituted on) (Italy) Carlo Festuccia (from (France) Racing-Métro); (substituted on) (Italy) Tommaso D'Apice (from (Italy) Roma)
LK	(substituted off) (South Africa) Vickus Liebenberg (joined (France) Aix-en-Provence)	
FL	(substituted off) (Italy) Aldo Birchall (joined (Italy) Rugby Calvisano); (substituted off) (South Africa) Gareth Krause (retired – but then joined (South Africa) Border Bulldogs in 2012)	(substituted on) (South Africa) Frans Viljoen (from (South Africa) Cheetahs); (substituted on) (Italy) Filippo Ferrarini (from (Italy) Crociati)
N8	(substituted off) (Italy) Jaco Erasmus (joined (Italy) Rugby Calvisano)	
SH	(substituted off) (Italy) Pablo Canavosio (joined (Italy) Rugby Calvisano); (substituted off) (Italy) Mickey Wilson (released – joined (Italy) Rovigo)	(substituted on) (New Zealand) Tyson Keats (from (New Zealand) Hurricanes)
FH	(substituted off) (Italy) Riccardo Bocchino (released – joined (Italy) Cavalieri Prato); (substituted off) (New Zealand) James Marshall (released – joined (New Zealand) Tasman)	(substituted on) (Italy) Luciano Orquera (from (France) Brive); (substituted on) (South Africa) Naas Oliver (from (South Africa) Cheetahs)
CE	(substituted off) (South Africa) Dylan des Fountain (joined (South Africa) Lions); (substituted off) (Argentina) Horacio San Martin (released – (France) Périgueux)	(substituted on) (Italy) Andrea Masi (from (France) Racing-Métro)
WG	(substituted off) (South Africa) Danwel Demas (joined (South Africa) Boland); (substituted off) (France) Julien Laharrague (released – joined (France) Lourdes); (substituted off) (Italy) Giulio Rubini (released – joined (Italy) Crociati)	(substituted on) (Samoa) Sinoti Sinoti (from (New Zealand) Hawkes Bay)
FB		(substituted on) (Italy) Ruggero Trevisan (from (Italy) Crociati Parma Rugby FC)
Coach		

Aironi again struggled in the Pro12 league and finished last. However they did record four victories, including a notable home win over defending champions Munster and eventual Heineken Cup Semi-finalists Edinburgh. In a very tough Heineken Cup group they failed to record any win, or even a losing bonus point. In March Aironi announced they were in financial difficulty. The FIR decided to withdraw their licence for the upcoming season, the death knell for Aironi.

Viadana, the primary club behind Aironi applied to take the vacant place in the Pro12 but this was rejected by the FIR. In June 2012 it was announced that the new franchise would be known as Zebre, which would be based in Parma and be built around Italian players.

Pro12 Table
Pos	Team	Pld	W	D	L	PF	PA	PD	TF	TA	TB	LB	Pts	Qualification (Note: Qualification for the Heineken Cup is based on each country's allocation, i.e. three highest-ranked Irish teams, three highest-ranked Welsh teams, both Italian teams and both Scottish teams. Because Leinster won the 2012 Heineken Cup Final, Ireland earned an extra Heineken Cup place, which will go to Connacht. Aironi were denied a licence for the 2012–13 season due to financial issues; the newly established Zebre side replaced Aironi in the Pro12 and Heineken Cup.)
1	(Ireland) Leinster (F)	22	18	1	3	568	326	+242	48	28	5	2	81	Play-off place
2	(Wales) Ospreys (C)	22	16	1	5	491	337	+154	44	22	2	3	71	Play-off place
3	(Ireland) Munster (SF)	22	14	1	7	489	367	+122	45	27	5	4	67	Play-off place
4	(Scotland) Glasgow Warriors (SF)	22	13	4	5	445	321	+124	34	23	2	3	65	Play-off place
5	(Wales) Scarlets	22	12	2	8	446	373	+73	43	30	5	5	62	
6	(Ireland) Ulster	22	12	0	10	474	424	+50	53	41	5	3	56	
7	(Wales) Cardiff Blues	22	10	0	12	446	460	−14	43	45	5	5	50	
8	(Ireland) Connacht	22	7	1	14	321	433	−112	27	36	0	7	37	
9	(Wales) Newport Gwent Dragons	22	7	1	14	370	474	−104	27	41	1	5	36	
10	(Italy) Benetton Treviso	22	7	0	15	419	558	−139	41	57	3	5	36	
11	(Scotland) Edinburgh	22	6	1	15	454	588	−134	42	65	2	4	32	
12	(Italy) Aironi	22	4	0	18	289	551	−262	22	54	1	5	22	

Updated to match(es) played on 5 May 2012. Source: RaboDirect PRO12
Rules for classification: If teams are level at any stage, tiebreakers are applied in the following order:
1. number of matches won;
2. the difference between points for and points against;
3. the number of tries scored;
4. the most points scored;
5. the difference between tries for and tries against;
6. the fewest red cards received;
7. the fewest yellow cards received.
  (C) Champions; (F) Lost in the final; (SF) Lost in the semi-finals
  Notes:

== Transfers ==
=== Players Out 2012–2013 ===
- (Italy) Alberto de Marchi to (Italy) Benetton Treviso
- (Italy) Giulio Toniolatti to (Italy) Benetton Treviso
- (Italy) Carlo Del Fava to (England) Newcastle
- (Italy) Lorenzo Romano to (England) Saracens
- (Italy) Fabio Staibano to (England) Wasps
- (Italy) George Biagi to (England) Bristol
- (Italy) Joshua Furno to (France) Narbonne
- (New Zealand) Nick Williams to (Ireland) Ulster
- (South Africa) Frans Viljoen to (South Africa) Free State Cheetahs
- Matías Agüero to (Italy) Zebre
- Andrea de Marchi to (Italy) Zebre
- Salvatore Perugini to (Italy) Zebre
- Tommaso D'Apice to (England) Gloucester
- Antonio Denti to (Italy) Zebre
- Marco Bortolami to (Italy) Zebre
- Quintin Geldenhuys to (Italy) Zebre
- Nicola Cattina to (Italy) Zebre
- Filippo Ferrarini to (Italy) Zebre
- Tito Tebaldi to (Italy) Zebre
- Luciano Orquera to (Italy) Zebre
- Gilberto Pavan to (Italy) Zebre
- Matteo Pratichetti to (Italy) Zebre
- Roberto Quartaroli to (Italy) Zebre
- Giovanbattista Venditti to (Italy) Zebre
- Alberto Benettin to (Italy) Zebre
- Paolo Buso to (Italy) Zebre
- Ruggero Trevisan to (Italy) Zebre
- Naas Olivier to (South Africa) Pumas
