= Dan Lydiate =

Wales & British Lions international rugby union player

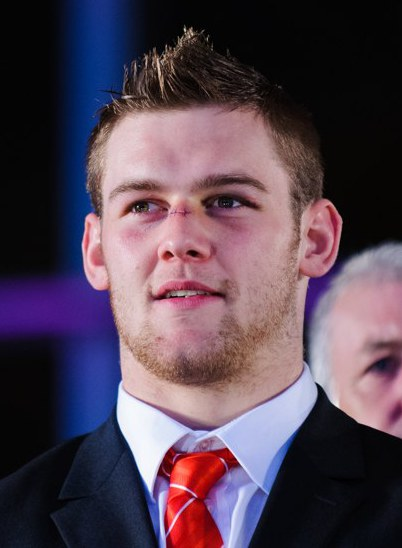
- Born: Danny John Lydiate; 18 December 1987 (age 38) Salford, England
- Height: 1.93 m (6 ft 4 in)
- Weight: 115 kg (254 lb; 18 st 2 lb)

Rugby union career
- Position: Blindside Flanker
Senior career
Years	Team	Apps	(Points)
- Ebbw Vale
2007–2013	Newport Gwent Dragons	85	(15)
2008–2009	Pontypool	4	(0)
2013–2014	Racing Métro	20	(0)
2014–2023	Ospreys	89	(15)
2023–2025	Dragons	21	(0)
- Correct as of 11:51, 6 February 2026 (UTC)
International career
Years	Team	Apps	(Points)
–	Wales U20		
2009–2023	Wales	72	(5)
2013	British & Irish Lions	3	(0)
- Correct as of 18 July 2025

Dan Lydiate (born 18 December 1987) is a retired Wales international rugby union player. A flanker, Lydiate was raised in Llandrindod Wells and is a product of the Newport Gwent Dragons academy.

== Early life ==
The younger of two boys born to English docker John Lydiate at Hope Hospital, their Welsh mother Lynne raised them in Salford, Greater Manchester. After their father suffered an injury, the family moved to Llandrindod Wells when Dan was aged 4, so that their father could work on his father-in-law's 202-hectare (500-acre) sheep farm in the Cambrian Mountains. Older brother Jack represented Wales colleges at rugby. Dan and Jack have two older brothers John (also born at Hope Hospital) and Steven and an older sister Gillian from their father's first marriage. While growing up in Powys, Lydiate attended Llanbister Primary School and Llandrindod High School.

== Career ==
He was an ever-present member of the Wales Under 20 back row along with Lewis Evans and James Harris for their Six Nations campaign in 2006/7 and progressed to the Dragons senior side at the end of that season. Early in the 2007/08 season he suffered a serious neck injury in the Heineken Cup Group match away to Perpignan which ruled him out for the rest of the season, with doubts raised as to whether or not he would ever play again.

On 25 October 2009 Lydiate was named in the Wales national squad for the November 2009 international series, making his debut as a second-half replacement against Argentina on 21 November 2009. Following the withdrawal of captain Ryan Jones from the Wales squad to face Australia in the final Autumn International, Lydiate made his first test match start at flanker on 28 November 2009. He was named in the Wales squad for the 2010 Six Nations Championship, however did not play a single game. He then broke into the Welsh first XV in the autumn internationals of that year, starting against Australia, New Zealand and Fiji as well as being named in the team to face South Africa before withdrawing with a calf injury. He won the Man of the Match award against the Fijians, where he wore the Number 7 jersey for the first time.

He played every match of Wales' 2011 Six Nations Championship campaign as well as all four warm-up matches. In August 2011 he was named in the Wales squad for the 2011 Rugby World Cup in New Zealand. He played in Wales' opening two games against South Africa and Samoa, but missed the pool games against Namibia and Fiji with an ankle injury. Treating the injury required him to wake up to ice his leg every hour. It paid off, and he played a key role in Wales' quarter-final win over Ireland and then subsequent losses to France and Australia. He finished second on the tournament's top-tacklers, behind only Wales and Dragons teammate Toby Faletau.

In the 2012 Six Nations Championship, Lydiate received the Player of the Tournament award after featuring in every game bar the opener against Ireland and receiving man of the match awards against Scotland and France.

In April 2013 Lydiate was named in the squad for the 2013 British & Irish Lions tour to Australia.

Lydiate left Newport Gwent Dragons at the end of the 2012–13 season and joined the Paris-based club Racing Métro 92.

On 30 October 2014 it was announced Lydiate would be leaving Racing Metro and returning to Wales on a dual contract between the Welsh Rugby Union and a Welsh region, on 7 December 2014 this was announced to be Ospreys

Lydiate was a part of the Welsh team for the 2015 Rugby World Cup.

=== International tries ===
Try	Opponent	Location	Venue	Competition	Date	Result
1	Japan	Cardiff, Wales	Millennium Stadium	2016 Autumn Internationals	19 November 2016	Win
