= Yoann Maestri =

French rugby union player (born 1988)

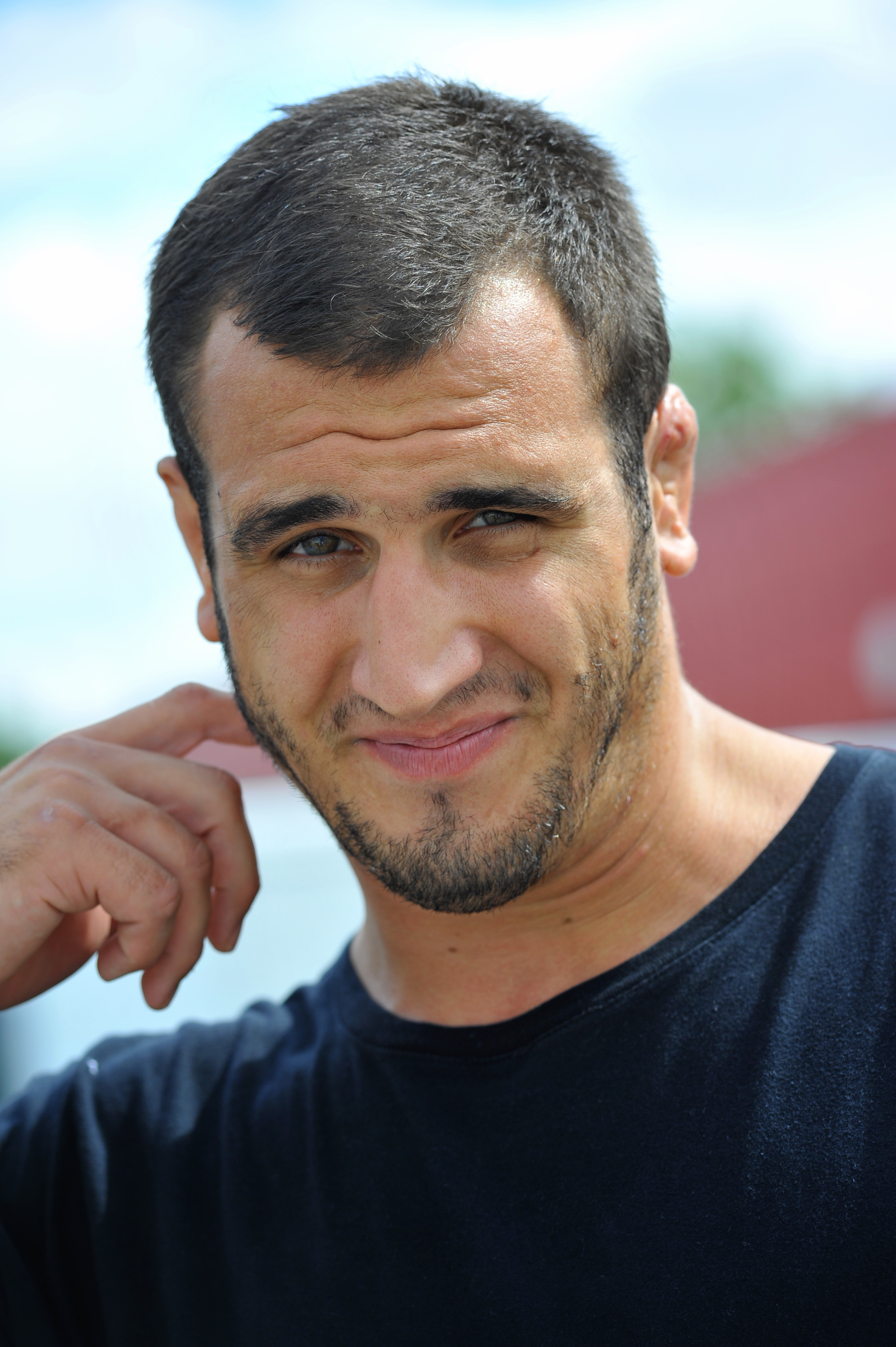
- Born: Yoann Maestri; 14 January 1988 (age 38) Hyères, France
- Height: 2.02 m (6 ft 7 1/2 in)
- Weight: 118 kg (18 st 8 lb; 260 lb) (19 st 1 lb)

Rugby union career
- Position: Lock
Senior career
Years	Team	Apps	(Points)
2006–2009	Toulon	44	(0)
2009–2018	Toulouse	213	(35)
2018–2022	Stade Français	67	(5)
2022ー2023	Toyota Industries Shuttles		
International career
Years	Team	Apps	(Points)
2012–2018	France	65	(5)

Yoann Maestri ([jo.an ma.ɛs.tʁi]; born 14 January 1988) is a former French rugby union international player who played for Toulon, Toulouse, and Stade Français all in the Top 14.

== Career ==
Maestri first began playing rugby for RC Carqueiranne-Hyères, before playing for Toulon professionally from 2006 in the 2006–07 Rugby Pro D2 season. However, he continued to play for RC Carqueiranne-Hyères as he was not selected at all in his debut season. In made his Toulon debut during the 2007–08 Rugby Pro D2 season, starting against AS Béziers Hérault on 28 October 2007. He went on to play a further 18 matches, 12 of which were starting positions. He helped the side to promotion to the 2008–09 Top 14 season, of which made sure Toulon participated in the 2008–09 European Challenge Cup. During Toulon's first season in the Top 14, Maestri played in 25 of the 32 matches that season, and his efforts and stand out performances kept Toulon in the Top flight division. He was later signed by the then French giants Toulouse for the 2009–10 Top 14 season. In his debut season with Toulouse, he made it all the way to the semi-final, losing to the eventual champions Perpignan 21–13. He was also part of the Toulouse side that won the 2010 Heineken Cup Final, beating Biarritz, 21–19 at the Stade de France. In the 2010–11 Top 14 season, Yoann earned his first French Top 14 title, having beaten Montpellier 15–10.

In January 2012, he was one of two uncapped players in the France national team for the 2012 Six Nations Championship. He earned his first cap on 4 February against Italy, with France running out 30–12 victors, but finishing 4th in the overall table. He was a regular face in the French camp, haven been named in every squad since his debut, and was only been named as a sub three times – one of which was his first test cap.
