= Giovanbattista Venditti =

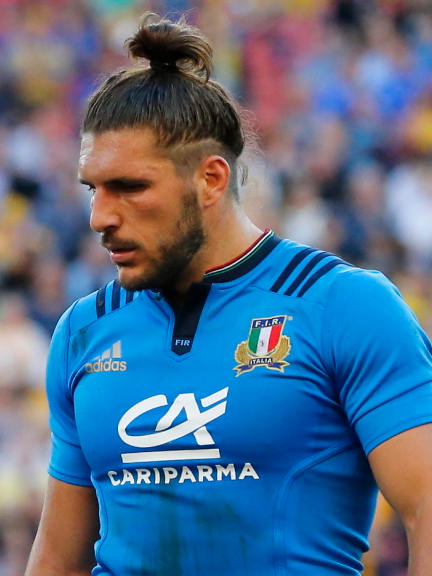
- Venditti playing for Italy against the Wallabies, 24 June 2017
- Born: Giovanbattista Venditti; 27 March 1990 (age 36) Avezzano, Italy
- Height: 1.87 m (6 ft 2 in)
- Weight: 111 kg (17 st 7 lb; 245 lb)
- University: San Raffaele University
- Occupation: Sports manager

Rugby union career
- Position(s): Wing, Centre
Senior career
Years	Team	Apps	(Points)
2009–10	Gran Ducato	9	(10)
2010–12	Aironi	23	(5)
2012–15	Zebre	42	(40)
2015−16	Newcastle	9	(0)
2016−19	Zebre	37	(35)
2020−22	Avezzano Rugby		
- Correct as of 22 Feb 2019
International career
Years	Team	Apps	(Points)
2009−10	Italy Under 20	13	(25)
2011	Emerging Italy	1	(5)
2012–17	Italy	44	(40)
- Correct as of 27 June 2017

Giovanbattista Venditti (Italian pronunciation: [dʒoˌvambatˈtista venˈditti]; born 27 March 1990) is a retired Italian rugby union player for of Italian national rugby union team. He represented Italy on 44 occasions and he normally played as a wing. In January 2012 he was called up to the Italian team for the 2012 Six Nations Championship. He made his Italian debut against France on 4 February 2012. He scored his first try for Italy in his second game against England.

Venditti played for Aironi from 2010 to 2012 and Zebre from 2012 to 2020 with exception for 2015-16 when he signed for Newcastle Falcons.
