= Brad Barritt =

British Lions & England international rugby union player

Bradley Barritt
- Born: Bradley Michael Barritt; 7 August 1986 (age 40) Durban, KwaZulu-Natal, South Africa
- Height: 1.85 m (6 ft 1 in)
- Weight: 101 kg (15 st 13 lb)
- School: Kearsney College
- University: University of Natal

Rugby union career
- Position: Centre
Senior career
Years	Team	Apps	(Points)
2008–2020	Saracens	261	(103)
- Correct as of 2 April 2018
Provincial / State sides
Years	Team	Apps	(Points)
2006–08	Sharks (Currie Cup)	29	(19)
Super Rugby
Years	Team	Apps	(Points)
2006–09	Sharks	36	(10)
International career
Years	Team	Apps	(Points)
2006	South Africa U21		
2007	Emerging Springboks	2	(0)
2009–11	England Saxons	6	(5)
2012–2015	England	26	(10)
2013	British & Irish Lions		
- Correct as of 4 October 2015

Bradley Barritt (born 7 August 1986) is a South African-born English former rugby union player. He played the position of centre. Born in South Africa, he played for South Africa U21 and the Emerging Springboks. In 2008 he moved to Saracens in England and was eligible for England selection. He played for England Saxons before making his full international debut for England in 2012, going on to win 26 caps. He was selected for the British & Irish Lions' 2013 tour to Australia.

== Early life ==
Barritt attended Kearsney College in Botha's Hill, KwaZulu-Natal.

== Career ==
Barritt's debut season was in 2006 for the Sharks and Sharks in the Currie Cup and Super 14.

He had the ability to occasionally play fly half and did so to great effect in the 2006 Currie Cup season when perennially injured provincial team-mate Butch James was absent from the squad. Due to the emergence of François Steyn at the coastal franchise, Barritt's opportunity to play fly half was curtailed, leading to him finding a more settled role as the Sharks' first-choice inside centre.

Barritt played in the 2007 Super 14 Final, losing by a solitary point to the Bulls.

He signed for the English Premiership side Saracens, and joined them after winning the 2008 Currie Cup.

Due to injuries, he was recalled to play in a 2009 Super 14 fixture against the Waratahs, his final game for the Sharks.

Barritt made his Saracens debut against Gloucester. During his time at Saracens he won five Premiership titles in 2011, 2015, 2016, 2018 and 2019, with Barritt featuring in all five finals. He also helped Saracens win the European Champions Cup in 2016, 2017 and 2019.

In June 2020, it was confirmed Barritt would leave Saracens at the conclusion of the 2019–20 season.

== International career ==
Barritt played for South Africa against France in the final of the 2006 Under 21 Rugby World Championship.

He represented the Emerging Springboks at the IRB Nations Cup in 2007.

Barritt was selected by England coach Martin Johnson to represent the England Saxons at the 2009 Churchill Cup. This was possible because Barritt had not yet had a senior-level cap for another country, and his British passport, through his Rhodesian parents, made him eligible for England as well as South Africa. Barritt's family has strong English roots, and many of his aunts and uncles live in England. Barritt's grandparents were born in England, and his grandfather played rugby union for English Universities. Barritt made his Saxons debut against the USA, scoring a try.

Barritt was called up to the England senior squad for the first time in 2010 to face the New Zealand Maori and again for the 2012 Six Nations Championship making his full debut against Scotland. He got his first points for England when he scored a try in a memorable win over New Zealand in December 2012.

On 15 June, Barritt was called up into the British & Irish Lions squad for the 2013 British & Irish Lions tour to Australia over injury concerns in the back line.

=== International tries ===
As of 7 July 2019

Try	Opposing team	Location	Venue	Competition	Date	Result	Score
1	New Zealand	London, England	Twickenham Stadium	2012 end-of-year rugby union internationals	1 December 2012	Win	38 – 21
2	South Africa	London, England	Twickenham Stadium	2014 end-of-year rugby union internationals	15 November 2014	Lost	28 – 31

Sporting positions
Preceded by Alistair Hargreaves	Saracens Captain; Jul 2016 – Jul 2020	Succeeded by Owen Farrell
