= Tom Court =

Irish rugby union player

- Born: Tom Court; 6 November 1980 (age 46) Brisbane, Australia
- Height: 1.91 m (6 ft 3 in)
- Weight: 122 kg (19 st 3 lb; 269 lb)
- School: Lowood State High School
- University: University of Queensland
- Occupation: Rugby union player

Rugby union career
- Position: Prop
Amateur team(s)
Years	Team	Apps	(Points)
2004	University of Queensland		
2004	Queensland A		
2004	Manawatu		
Senior career
Years	Team	Apps	(Points)
2004–2006	Queensland Reds	3	(0)
2006	Pertemps Bees	9	(0)
2006–2014	Ulster	154	(55)
2014–2017	London Irish	74	(10)
2018–2019	Independiente RC	12	(5)
- Correct as of 2 June 2020
International career
Years	Team	Apps	(Points)
2006–08	Ireland Wolfhounds	7	
2009–2013	Ireland	32	(5)
2013	British & Irish Lions	0	(0)
- Correct as of 15 Jun 2013

Tom Court (born 6 November 1980) is an Australian-born former rugby union footballer. He most recently played for London Irish as a loosehead prop. He primarily played at tighthead in his early career at Ulster but switched to loosehead in the 2007/2008 season when BJ Botha arrived at Ulster.

== Early life and sports career ==
Court was born in Brisbane, Australia and began his sporting career as a shotputter. He was Australian University Champion for three years running and had Olympic trials in 2002. He started playing rugby in 2004 and has represented Queensland Reds and Manawatu as well as Ulster.

=== Ulster and Ireland ===
Court represented the Ireland A side at the 2006 Churchill Cup only 16 months after first playing rugby union, before he had played his first game for Ulster. He qualified to play international rugby for Ireland through his grandfather, Patrick Carey, who was born in County Limerick, Ireland. He was also named in the 2008 Churchill Cup squad and appeared as a substitute in all three games; against USA, England Saxons and a representative Argentina XV. He made his full Ireland debut in an uncapped match against The Barbarians at Kingsholm Stadium in Gloucester.

Court was named as a replacement for all Ireland's matches of the 2009 Six Nations and earned his first cap as a replacement for Marcus Horan during Ireland's 38–9 victory over Italy on 15 February 2009. Court was named as part of Ireland's 2011 Rugby World Cup squad, and played in the Irish 15-6 victory over Australia (17 Sep 2011), coming on as a substitute against the country of his birth. Court made another appearance as a substitute, coming on in Ireland's final game of the 2012 Six Nations against England.

On 23 June 2013, Court was called up by the British & Irish Lions for their tour of Australia to act as cover for Alex Corbisiero.

On 27 January 2014, it was announced that Court has been signed by London Irish on a 3-year contract with the club, joining from the start of the 2014/15 season.
