= Ben Morgan =

Former England international rugby union player

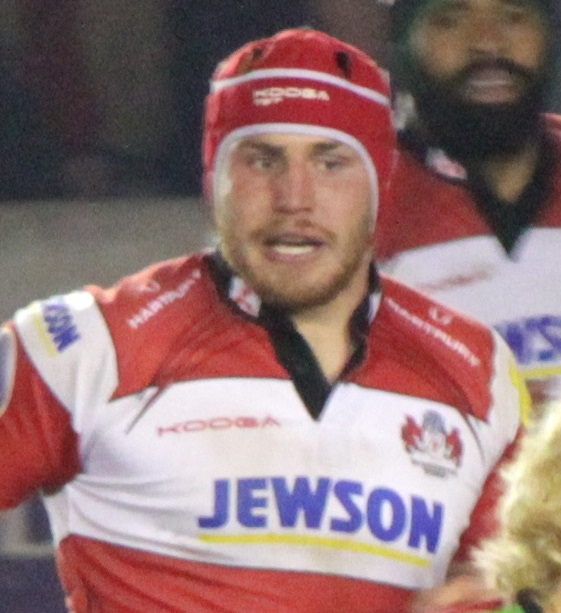
- Morgan playing for Gloucester Rugby in 2012
- Born: 18 February 1989 (age 37) Bristol, England
- Height: 1.91 m (6 ft 3 in)
- Weight: 117 kg (18 st 6 lb; 258 lb)
- School: Katharine Lady Berkeley's School

Rugby union career
- Position: Number eight
- Current team: Gloucester Rugby
Amateur team(s)
Years	Team	Apps	(Points)
- Dursley
Senior career
Years	Team	Apps	(Points)
2009–10	Llanelli RFC	33	(60)
2012–2023	Gloucester	187	(140)
- Correct as of 28 July 2020
Provincial / State sides
Years	Team	Apps	(Points)
2009–2012	Scarlets	50	(35)
International career
Years	Team	Apps	(Points)
2012–2015	England	31	(30)

Benjamin John Morgan (born 18 February 1989) is a former England international rugby union player who played number eight for Gloucester.

Morgan scored his first try for the Scarlets on 22 April 2011 against Glasgow Warriors.

Morgan went to Kingswood Primary School, Gloucestershire and Katharine Lady Berkeley's Secondary School. Morgan played junior rugby at Dursley RFC.

In June 2011, Morgan turned down the chance to play for England Saxons in the Churchill Cup. If he had played for the Saxons, he would not have been allowed to opt for Wales. On 4 January 2012, Morgan made the decision to make himself available to play international rugby for England. He had been due to qualify for Wales (having lived there for three years) in time for the 2012 Six Nations Championship. Morgan said the choice was a personal one, on the basis that he was born and bred in England.

On 11 January 2012, Morgan was named in the England training squad for the 2012 Six Nations Championship.

Morgan made his debut for England on 4 February 2012, coming on as a second-half replacement against Scotland in the 2012 Six Nations Championship. He played in all five of the six nations games, receiving the man of the match award in the final match against Ireland.

On 4 March 2012, Morgan signed for his boyhood club Gloucester Rugby from the Scarlets.

== International career ==
=== International tries ===
As of 7 July 2019

Try	Opposing team	Location	Venue	Competition	Date	Result	Score
1	Argentina	Salta, Argentina	Estadio Padre Ernesto Martearena	2013 Summer Internationals	8 June 2013	Win	32 – 3
2	Argentina	London, England	Twickenham Stadium	2013 Autumn Internationals	9 November 2013	Win	31 – 12
3	South Africa	London, England	Twickenham Stadium	2014 Autumn Internationals	15 November 2014	Loss	28 – 31
4	Australia	London, England	Twickenham Stadium	2014 Autumn Internationals	29 November 2014	Win	26 – 17
5	Australia	London, England	Twickenham Stadium	2014 Autumn Internationals	29 November 2014	Win	26 – 17
