= Julien Malzieu =

France international rugby union player

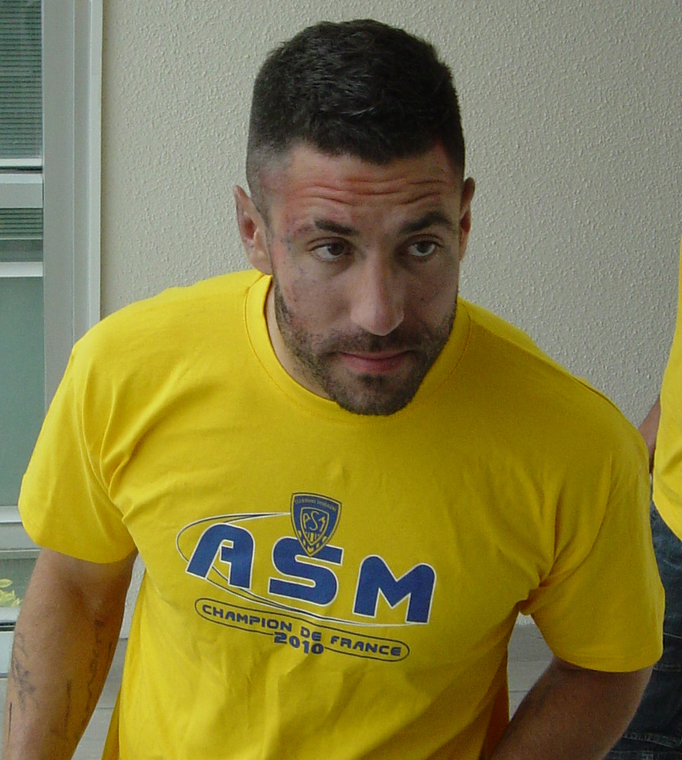
- Born: Julien Malzieu; 4 May 1983 (age 43) Le Puy-en-Velay, Haute-Loire, France
- Height: 6 ft 4 in (1.93 m)
- Weight: 14 st 13 lb (95 kg)

Rugby union career
- Position: Wing / Centre
- Current team: Montpellier HR
Senior career
Years	Team	Apps	(Points)
2002-15	ASM Clermont Auvergne	181	(315)
2015-17	Montpellier Herault Rugby	15	(25)
- Correct as of 17 December 2019
International career
Years	Team	Apps	(Points)
2008-2012	France	20	(25)

Julien Malzieu (born 4 May 1983 in Le Puy-en-Velay, Haute-Loire, Auvergne) is a former French rugby union and sevens player, who most recently played for Montpellier in the Top 14 competition.

== Career ==
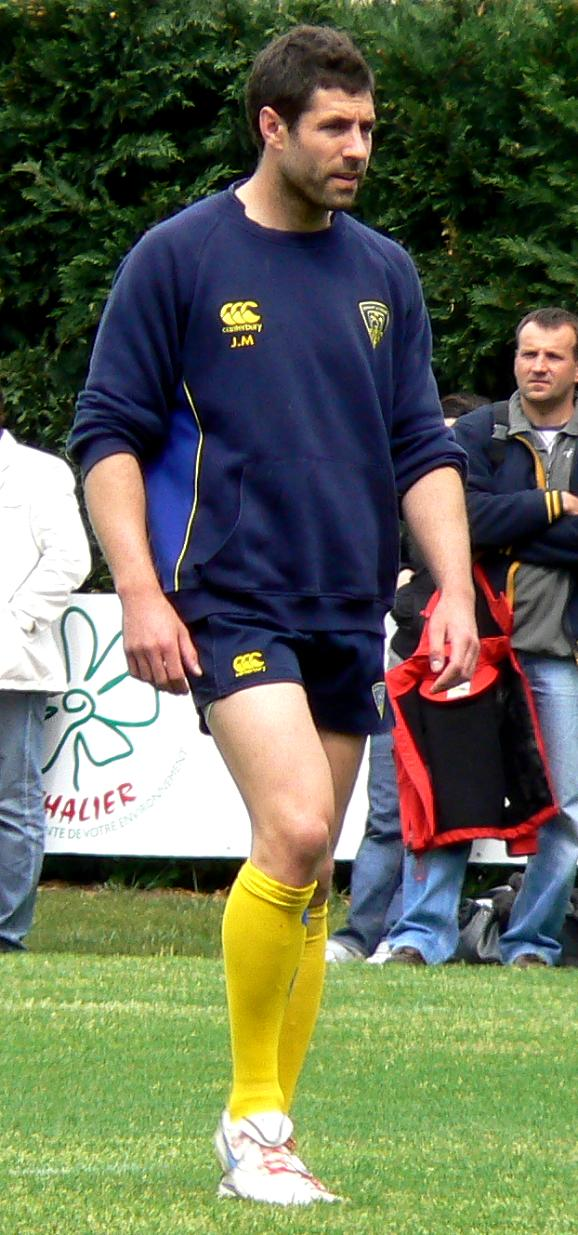
Julien Malzieu training

A tall and rangy wing, Malzieu burst onto the international scene in the 2008 Six Nations Championship, scoring a try on his debut for France against Scotland.

However, despite his promising start he did not gain a regular spot in the side with coach Marc Lievremont giving many other players a chance. The next time he scored was during the 34–10 loss to England in the 2009 Six Nations Championship. He scored another try the next week against Italy, but missed the 2009 Autumn internationals.

He was recalled for the 2010 Six Nations Championship after injuries to Aurélien Rougerie and Benjamin Fall but just played a bit part role coming off the bench a few times.

There is much competition in his position for France which has limited his time on the pitch so far.

At club level, he has played for Clermont Auvergne as they have risen in the European rugby leagues. He has a prolific try-scoring record for the club. He played in the final as Clermont won the Top 14 title in 2009–10.

His brother, Jérémy Malzieu was in the Clermont Auvergne squad, but now plays for Saint-Etienne in the Pro D2.

His other successes include being played as a starter in most of the recent 2012 Six Nations Championship games in which he scored a try in the first game against Italy.
