= Ross Rennie =

Scotland international rugby union player

- Born: Ross Michael Rennie; 29 March 1986 (age 40) Edinburgh, Scotland
- Height: 1.86 m (6 ft 1 in)
- Weight: 100 kg (15 st 10 lb)
- School: Edinburgh Academy
- Occupation(s): Former rugby domestic and international flanker

Rugby union career
- Position: Flanker
Senior career
Years	Team	Apps	(Points)
2005–2014	Edinburgh Rugby	91	(20)
2014–2015	Bristol Rugby	13	(25)
- Correct as of 13 May 2014
International career
Years	Team	Apps	(Points)
2008–2011	Scotland	20	(0)
- Correct as of 12 November 2012

Ross Rennie (born 29 March 1986 in Scotland) is a former rugby union player. He first played for Edinburgh Rugby and then Bristol Rugby as well as representing the Scotland national team. His position of choice is Flanker.

He was called up to the Scotland squad for the 2008 Six Nations Championship. He was also selected in the Scotland squad for the 2011 Rugby World Cup in New Zealand. He started his professional career at Edinburgh Rugby and, after falling out of favour under Head Coach Alan Solomons, was sent out on loan to Bristol Rugby for the second half of the 2013–14 season, making the deal permanent before the 2014–15 season after a string of impressive performances in the number seven jersey.

On 14 January 2015, Rennie announced his retirement from rugby with immediate effect due to a neurological problem.
