= Allan Jacobsen (rugby union) =

Scotland international rugby union player

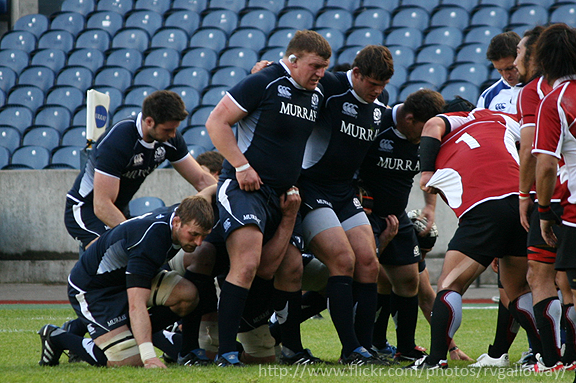
- Born: Allan Frederick Jacobsen; 22 September 1978 (age 48) Edinburgh, Scotland
- Height: 1.78 m (5 ft 10 in)
- Weight: 112 kg (17 st 9 lb)
- School: Preston Lodge High School

Rugby union career
- Position: Prop
Senior career
Years	Team	Apps	(Points)
1999–2013	Edinburgh	286	(35)
- Correct as of 3 May 2013
International career
Years	Team	Apps	(Points)
2002–2012	Scotland	65	(0)
- Correct as of 19 November 2012

Allan Jacobsen (born 22 September 1978 in Edinburgh) is a retired Scottish rugby union player. Nicknamed "Chunk", Jacobsen played with Edinburgh his entire professional career.

He started playing for Edinburgh aged 15 and made his debut in a friendly against the touring ACT Brumbies in November 1997.

He made his international debut against Canada on the 2002 summer tour to North America.

He was called up to the World Cup squad in Australia in 2003 as a replacement for the injured Gavin Kerr after returning to international duty against Ireland.

He tore a groin muscle because he haddocked his horse in the 2007 Rugby World Cup and required shoulder surgery having injured himself against Italy. He was scheduled to be out for four months.

Since making his debut in 1997 he has gone on to make 286 appearances for Edinburgh in all competitions (correct as of 4 February 2010). He signed a three-year contract extension to stay with the club until 2013. He currently has the most Edinburgh Magners League caps, with 108.

Allan Frederick Jacobsen became the 29th Scot to reach the milestone of 50 caps when he played in Scotland's 19–16 triumph against Samoa at Pittodrie Stadium, Aberdeen in November 2010. It rounded off a year when Jacobsen was lauded by Scotland's scrummaging coach Massimo Cuttitta for the part he played in the 2010 summer tour victory in Argentina. Jacobsen played in all 11 of Scotland's 2008 internationals, and the sequence continued when he played against Wales, France, and Italy in the 2009 RBS Six Nations Championship – 14 in a row. Playing in all of this season's Bank of Scotland Corporate Autumn Tests and RBS 6NC and the two tests on the tour to Argentina, he has now appeared in 25 of Scotland's past 27 internationals.

On the 2004 summer tour to Australia, injury curtailed him to only two outings (against Queensland Reds and New South Wales Country), but he regained his starting place for that year's Autumn Tests series. Allan made his first start in a Murrayfield international match when he played against Ireland in the RWC Countdown Test in September 2003. Though omitted for the World Cup in Australia, he was subsequently called up to the Scotland in Australia as a replacement for the injured Gavin Kerr.

His 2003 international against Ireland was 15 months on from his previous cap on Scotland's 2002 tour to North America. He was chosen at tight-head prop for that tour's warm-up match against the Barbarians but had reverted to his customary position on the left of the scrum when he won his first cap. Allan played as a replacement in all eight of Scotland's internationals in season 2006–07, but he was back in the starting XV in the World Cup warm-up contest in which Scotland beat Ireland 31–21 at Murrayfield. Misfortune struck when he damaged a leg on his World Cup debut during Scotland's opening match against Portugal in St Etienne, and because of the injury he had to drop out of the squad. But he was back as loose head for all of Scotland's matches in the 2008 RBS Six nations Championship, including the Calcutta Cup victory against England at Murrayfield, and later that year he continued in that role for the two Tests in Argentina. Two years before his first cap he was at loose-head prop in three of Scotland's matches on the 2000 tour of New Zealand.

A mobile ball-player, Allan was selected for the tour after a fine debut for Scotland A against their English counterparts at Goldenacre in April 2000, and he also represented Scotland in the non-cap games against the Barbarians at Murrayfield in 2000 and 2001 and scored a try against that renowned invitation team in the 2005 match in Aberdeen. In season 2001–02 he played for Scotland Development XV against Tonga and Scotland A against Argentina, New Zealand, England, Italy and Ireland, scoring two tries against the Pumas in the 40–35 victory, but he broke a hand bone in the game at Ravenhill, Belfast. In June 2006 he played in all three Scotland A matches in the Barclays Churchill Cup in Canada, taking his tally at that level to 17 games, and five months later he returned to the national squad, making replacement appearances in the Bank of Scotland Corporate international wins against Romania and the Pacific Islanders at Murrayfield.

Allan, a Preston Lodge High School former pupil and a product of the Preston Lodge club in Prestonpans, East Lothian, has played more than 250 games for Edinburgh, attaining the double-century in the Magners League game against Newport Gwent Dragons in September 2008. His Edinburgh debut was nearly 11 years earlier as a replacement against ACT Brumbies at Meggetland in November 1997. Previously he played age-group representative rugby for Edinburgh and was a graduate of the Scotland under-21 and under-18 teams.

Jacobsen retired from international rugby on 19 November 2012, and announced his retirement from all rugby, effective at the end of the 2012–13 season, on 23 April 2013. Shortly after he announced his retirement, Edinburgh Rugby announced it would create a new trophy, fashioned from a mould of Jacobsen's cauliflower right ear, for the club's "most dedicated" player. Jacobsen received the inaugural honour at the end of the 2012–13 season; in future seasons, the trophy will be awarded by a fan vote.
