= Tommaso D'Apice =

Italy international rugby union player

- Born: 30 June 1988 (age 38)
- Height: 6 ft 0 in (1.83 m)
- Weight: 229 lb (16 st 5 lb; 104 kg)

Rugby union career
- Position: Hooker
- Current team: Zebre
Senior career
Years	Team	Apps	(Points)
2007-2008	Benevento	12	(0)
2008-2009	Rugby Calvisano	9	(5)
2009-2011	Rugby Roma	26	(15)
2011	→Aironi	2	(0)
2011-2012	Aironi	10	(5)
2012-2013	Gloucester Rugby	5	(0)
2013-2018	Zebre	63	(30)
International career
Years	Team	Apps	(Points)
2008	Italy Under 20	3	(5)
2011−2013	Emerging Italy	5	(0)
2011–2017	Italy	13	(5)
- Correct as of 12 March 2017

Tommaso D'Apice (born 30 June 1988) is an Italian rugby union footballer who plays as a hooker. D'Apice was part of the Italian squad at the 2011 Rugby World Cup and joined Aironi after the tournament. After Aironi were disbanded he joined Gloucester Rugby. Following his departure from Gloucester, Tommaso D Apice has signed a contract to return to Italy to join Zebre for the new season.
