= Richie Vernon =

Scotland international rugby union player

- Born: Richard John Vernon; 7 July 1987 (age 39) Dundee, Scotland
- Height: 1.98 m (6 ft 6 in)
- Weight: 105 kg (16 st 7 lb)
- School: High School of Dundee
- University: University of Edinburgh

Rugby union career
- Position(s): Outside Centre, Flanker, Number eight
Amateur team(s)
Years	Team	Apps	(Points)
- Dundee HSFP
2008-09	West of Scotland		
2009-10	Dundee HSFP		
2010-11	Ayr		
2011-14	Stirling County		
2014-18	Currie		
Senior career
Years	Team	Apps	(Points)
2006–07	Border Reivers	6	(0)
2007–11	Glasgow Warriors	48	(10)
2011–13	Sale Sharks	48	(50)
2013–2018	Glasgow Warriors	48	(25)
2018–19	London Scottish	18	(5)
International career
Years	Team	Apps	(Points)
2009–	Scotland	24	(0)
- Correct as of 22 May 2016
National sevens team
Years	Team		Comps
2005-08	Scotland 7s		13 (120)

Richie Vernon (born 7 July 1987) is a former Scotland international rugby union player with London Scottish. He previously was with Glasgow Warriors, playing for the Glasgow side over two spells. He has also previously played for the now defunct Border Reivers and Sale Sharks.

== Rugby union career ==
=== Amateur career ===
Educated at the High School of Dundee, Vernon then played for Dundee HSFP.

Vernon has been drafted to Currie in the Scottish Premiership for the 2017–18 season.

=== Professional career ===
Vernon started his pro career at the Border Reivers until they disbanded in 2007. His contract was then move to Glasgow where he would breakthrough into the team playing mainly at No. 8 or openside flanker.

With the establishment of the "Killer B's" as the first choice back row at Glasgow, he left the Warriors in 2011 for Sale Sharks, signing a two-year deal with hopes for more gametime to develop his game and enhance his prospects for more caps with Scotland.

At the end of 2013 he returned to Glasgow. However, he struggled to tie down a regular starting place in the back row due to injuries form and also stiff competition within the squad. This led to an unusual conversion in position to centre following discussions with Warriors head coach Gregor Townsend and Scotland coach Scott Johnson, who hope to more readily use his 6-foot, 5-inch frame and evident pace.

Vernon announced his retirement from rugby to finish at the end of the 2018–19 season on 12 March 2019.

=== International career ===
Vernon played Rugby Sevens for Scotland between 2005 and 2008, gaining his first cap in the Dubai Tournament.

Vernon won his first cap for Scotland as a replacement for Johnnie Beattie in the 23–10 victory over Fiji in the 2009 Autumn Internationals.
