= Robert Barbieri =

Italy international rugby union player

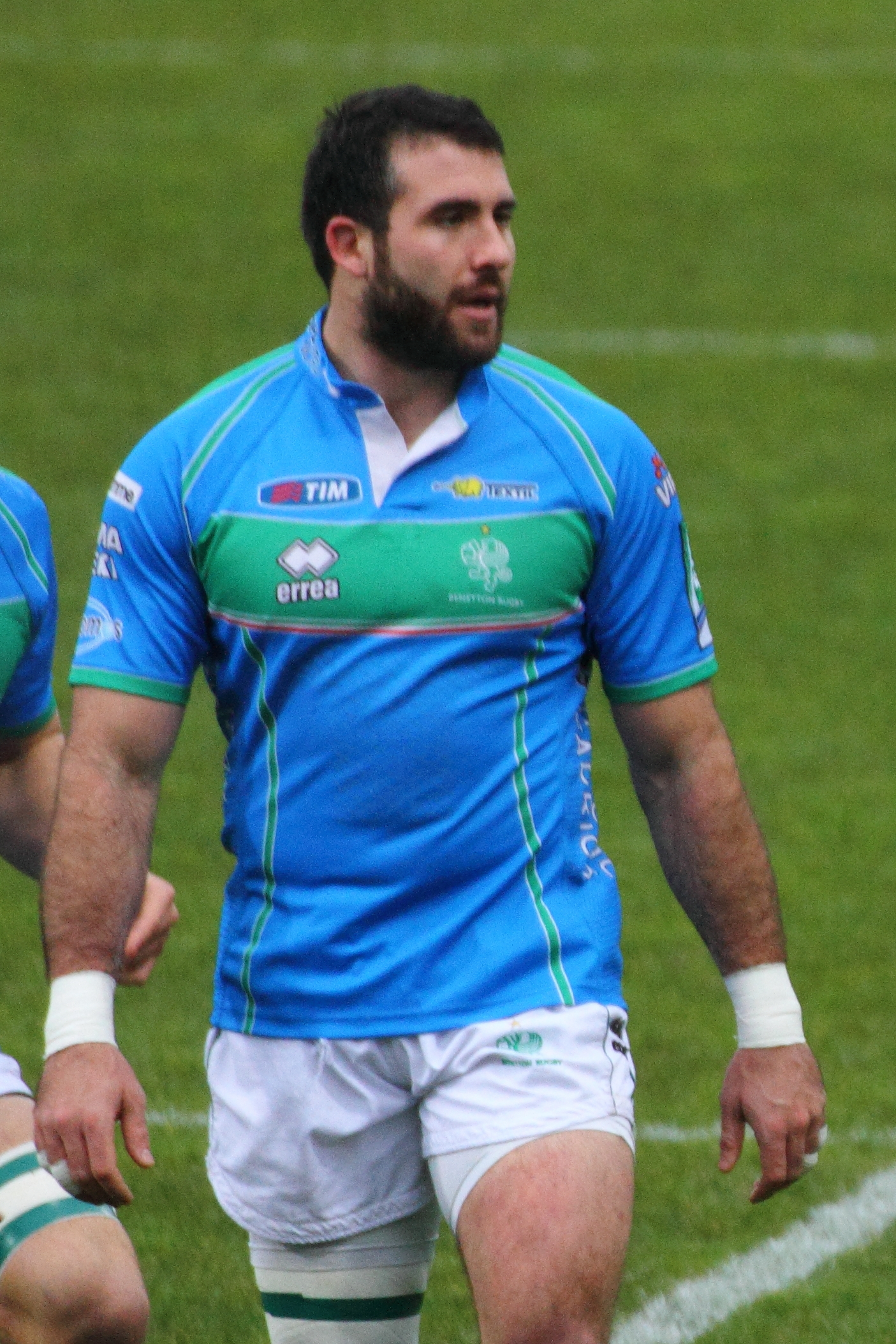
- Born: Robert Julian Barbieri; 5 June 1984 (age 42) Toronto, Ontario, Canada
- Height: 1.85 m (6 ft 1 in)
- Weight: 108 kg (238 lb; 17 st 0 lb)

Rugby union career
- Position(s): Flanker, number 8
Senior career
| Years | Team | Apps | (Points) |
| 2000–2003 | Yeomen | | |
| 2003–2007 | Crociati RFC | 50 | (45) |
| 2007–2014 | Benetton Treviso | 113 | (125) |
| 2014–2015 | Leicester Tigers | 19 | (10) |
| 2015–2019 | Benetton | 57 | (35) |
International career
| Years | Team | Apps | (Points) |
| 2008−2010 | Italy A | 6 | (5) |
| 2006–2017 | Italy | 41 | (15) |
- Correct as of 10 June 2017

Robert Julian Barbieri (born 5 June 1984) is a Canadian-born Italian retired rugby union player. He played as a flanker and 8-man. He decided to represent Italy.

== Club career ==
He played for Yeomen (2000–03) in Canada, before moving to the Italian side Overmach Rugby Parma (2003–07). Barbieri then went to play for Benetton Treviso.

On 21 May 2014, Barbieri moved to England to join Leicester Tigers, who compete in the Aviva Premiership, for the 2014-15 season. However, on 14 April 2015, Barbieri rejoined Benetton Treviso in the Pro12.

On 9 May 2019, Barbieri was released by Benetton Treviso and subsequently ended his playing career.

== International career ==
Barbieri's first game for Italy was in the 52–6 win over Japan, on 9 June 2006, on the same day that his brother, Michael Barbieri, earned his first cap for Canada in Toronto against England. Robert Barbieri was a member of the Italian squad in the 2007 Rugby World Cup finals, but was ruled out because of injury. He took part in the 2011 Rugby World Cup. His final national team call-up was in summer 2017 for a test match in Singapore.
