= David Attoub =

France international rugby union player

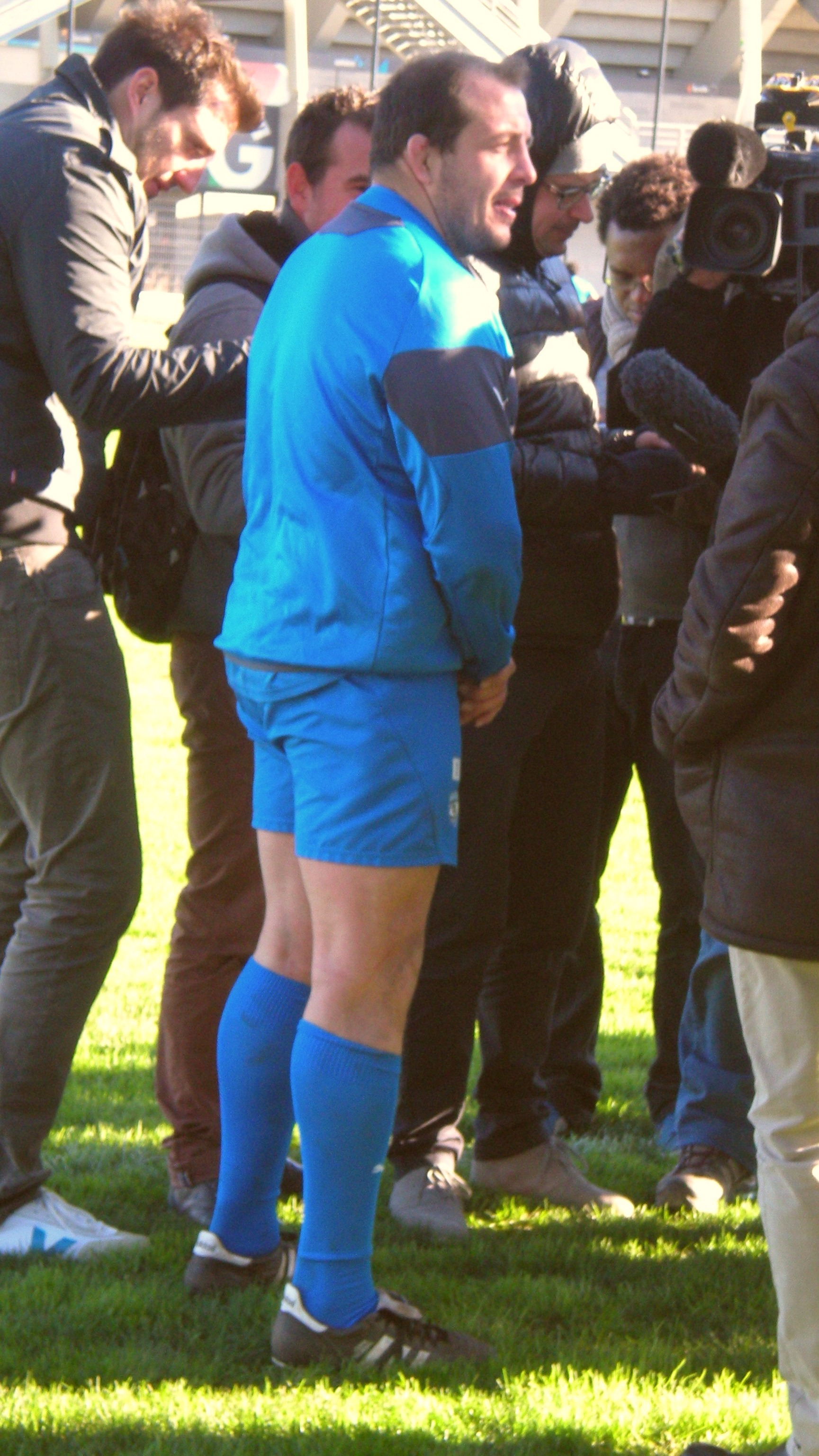
- Born: June 7, 1981 (age 45) Valence, Drôme
- Height: 6 ft 0 in (1.83 m)
- Weight: 239 lb (108 kg)

Rugby union career
- Position: Prop
Senior career
Years	Team	Apps	(Points)
2002-2005	Clermont	32	(10)
2005-2007	Castres	28	(15)
2007-2014	Stade Français	141	(0)
2014-2015	Montpellier	2	(0)
2015-17	Lyon	40	(0)
International career
Years	Team	Apps	(Points)
2006-2012	France	4	(0)

David Attoub (born 7 June 1981 in Valence, Drôme) is a French retired rugby union footballer of Tunisian origin. He formerly played for Valence Sportif, Clermont Auvergne, Castres Olympique, Stade Français and Montpellier and has also played for France. His position is prop.

== Career ==
David Attoub played for Valence Sportif in Fédérale 1 from 2000 until 2003, when he signed for ASM Clermont Auvergne for the next season. He stayed there until 2005. Montferrand were finalists of the 2003-04 European Challenge Cup, but were defeated by Harlequins by one point, 27 to 26. He was included in France's squad for a test against the United States on 3 July 2004 but was not used from the bench.

He signed with Castres Olympique for the 2005-06 Top 14. He was included in France's squad for two mid year test matches in June 2006, and went on to make his international debut against Romania on 17 June. He joined the Stade Français in 2007.

In December 2009, Attoub was cited for contact with the eye/eye area of Ulster player Stephen Ferris in contravention of Law 10.4. He received a record 70-week ban. A contributing factor in the length of the ban was that he had been found guilty of eye gouging earlier in his career.

David Attoub signed with Montpellier for the 2014–15 Top 14 season.
