= Tommaso Benvenuti (rugby union) =

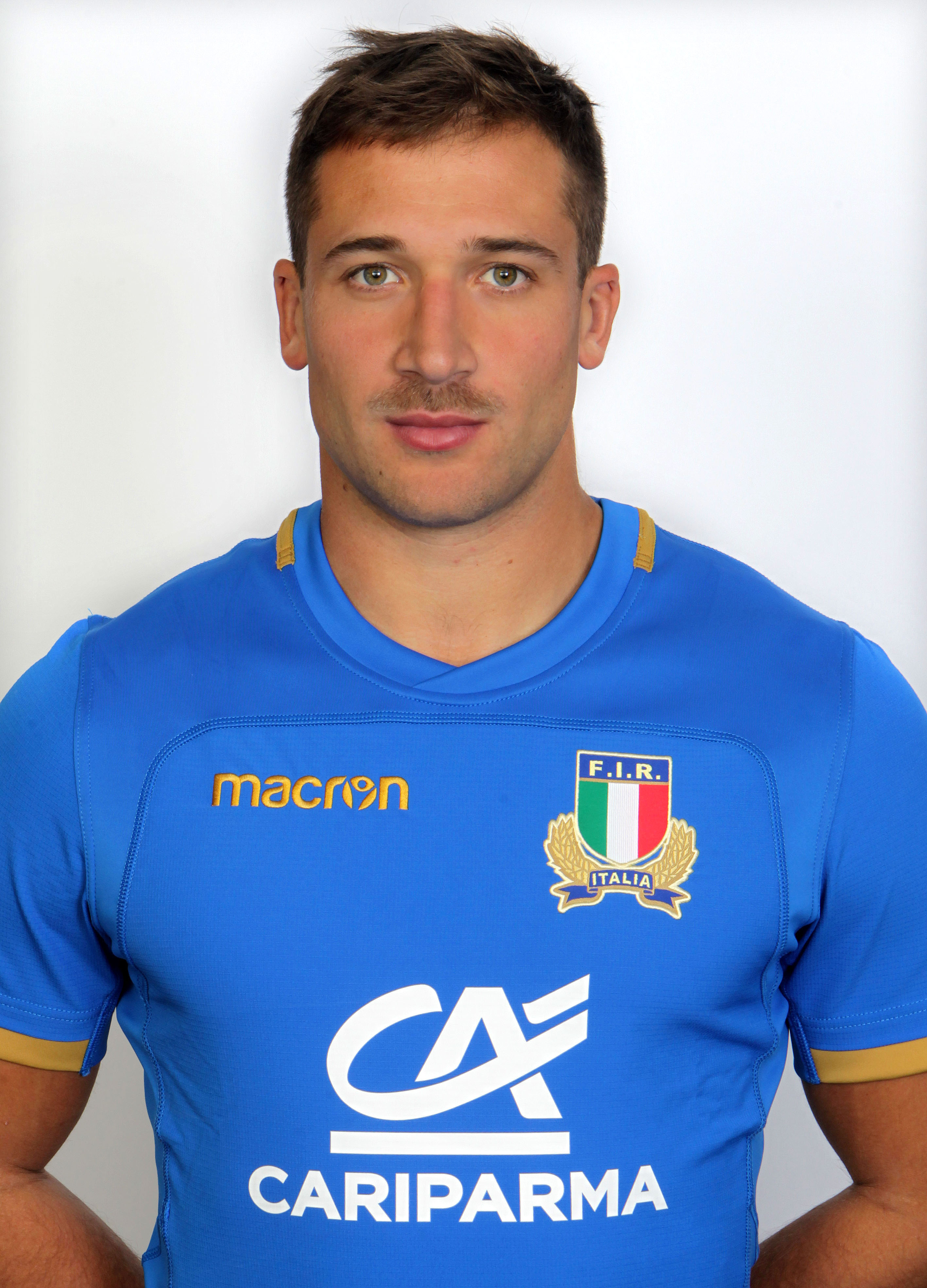
- Born: Tommaso Benvenuti; 12 December 1990 (age 35) Vittorio Veneto, Italy
- Height: 6 ft 1 in (1.85 m)
- Weight: 14 st 8 lb (204 lb; 93 kg)

Rugby union career
- Position: Centre / Wing / Fullback
Senior career
Years	Team	Apps	(Points)
2009–2013	Benetton Treviso	49	(68)
2013–2014	Perpignan	27	(15)
2015–2016	Bristol	12	(5)
2016–2022	Benetton	75	(25)
- Correct as of 25 March 2022
International career
Years	Team	Apps	(Points)
2008–2010	Italy U20s	19	(85)
2010	Emerging Italy	2	(0)
2010–	Italy	62	(35)
- Correct as of 4 October 2019

Tommaso Benvenuti (born 12 December 1990) is an Italian rugby union player. He plays as a centre, wing or fullback. He plays for Benetton. In October 2010, he was selected for the Italy training squad preparing for the November tests. He made his Italy debut against Argentina on 13 November 2010. He also played at the 2011 Rugby World Cup in New Zealand.

Benvenuti has previously played for Benetton Treviso and Perpignan. In January 2015, Tommaso made the journey across the Channel, joining Greene King IPA Championship side Bristol, and then left for Benetton Treviso from 2016 to 2022.

He gains a cap with the Barbarians on 1 December 2018, starting against Argentina at Twickenham, eventually winning the game 38-35 with what was described as an thrilling comeback.

About Rugby World Cup, on 21 August 2011, he was named in the final 31-man squad for the 2015 Rugby World Cup., on 24 August 2015, he was named in the final 31-man squad for the 2015 Rugby World Cup and on 18 August 2019, he was named in the final 31-man squad for the 2019 Rugby World Cup.

From 2008 and 2010, Benvenuti was named in the Italy Under 20 squad and in 2010 also in the Italy A squad.
