= Vincent Debaty =

France international rugby union player (born 1981)

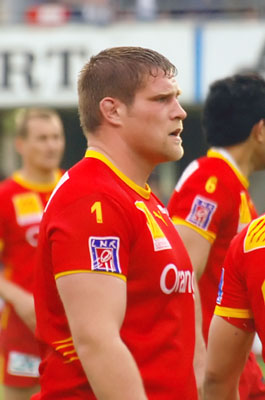
- Born: 2 October 1981 (age 45) Woluwe-Saint-Lambert, Brussels, Belgium
- Height: 192 cm (6 ft 4 in)
- Weight: 128 kg (20 st 2 lb; 282 lb)

Rugby union career
- Position: Loosehead Prop
Senior career
| Years | Team | Apps | (Points) |
| 1996-1999 | Kituro | | |
| 1999-2002 | La Rochelle | 5 | (5) |
| 2002-2007 | Perpignan | 77 | (15) |
| 2007-2008 | Agen | 21 | (10) |
| 2008-2017 | Clermont | 171 | (45) |
| 2017- | Oyonnax Rugby | | |
- Correct as of 13 October 2017
International career
| Years | Team | Apps | (Points) |
| 2006- | France | 37 | (5) |
- Correct as of 17 October 2015

Vincent Debaty (French pronunciation: [vɛ̃sɑ̃ dɛbati]; born 2 October 1981) is a Belgian born French rugby union footballer. He has played for France and in the Top 14 for ASM Clermont Auvergne with whom he won two Top 14 Championships in 2010 & 2017.

In February 2017 it was announced that he had signed for Oyonnax Rugby who at the time were leading the Rugby Pro D2 Championship and were subsequently promoted back into the Top 14 for season 2017/18.

Debaty plays as a prop. He holds dual French-Belgian citizenship. He earned his first cap for France against Romania on 17 June 2006 in Bucharest, it was another six seasons before he earned his second cap starting in a 30 - 12 France victory against Italy in the Six Nations Championship on 4 Feb 2012. He went on to earn another 35 Caps, his final Cap coming on 17 October 2015 in the 2015 Rugby World Cup Quarter-Final defeat to New Zealand in Cardiff.

== Honours ==
- Heineken Cup and European Rugby Champions Cup:
  - Runners-up (3): 2013, 2015, 2017
- Top 14:
  - Winners (2): 2010, 2017
  - Runners-up (3): 2008, 2009, 2015
