= Wesley Fofana (rugby union) =

France international rugby union player (born 1988)

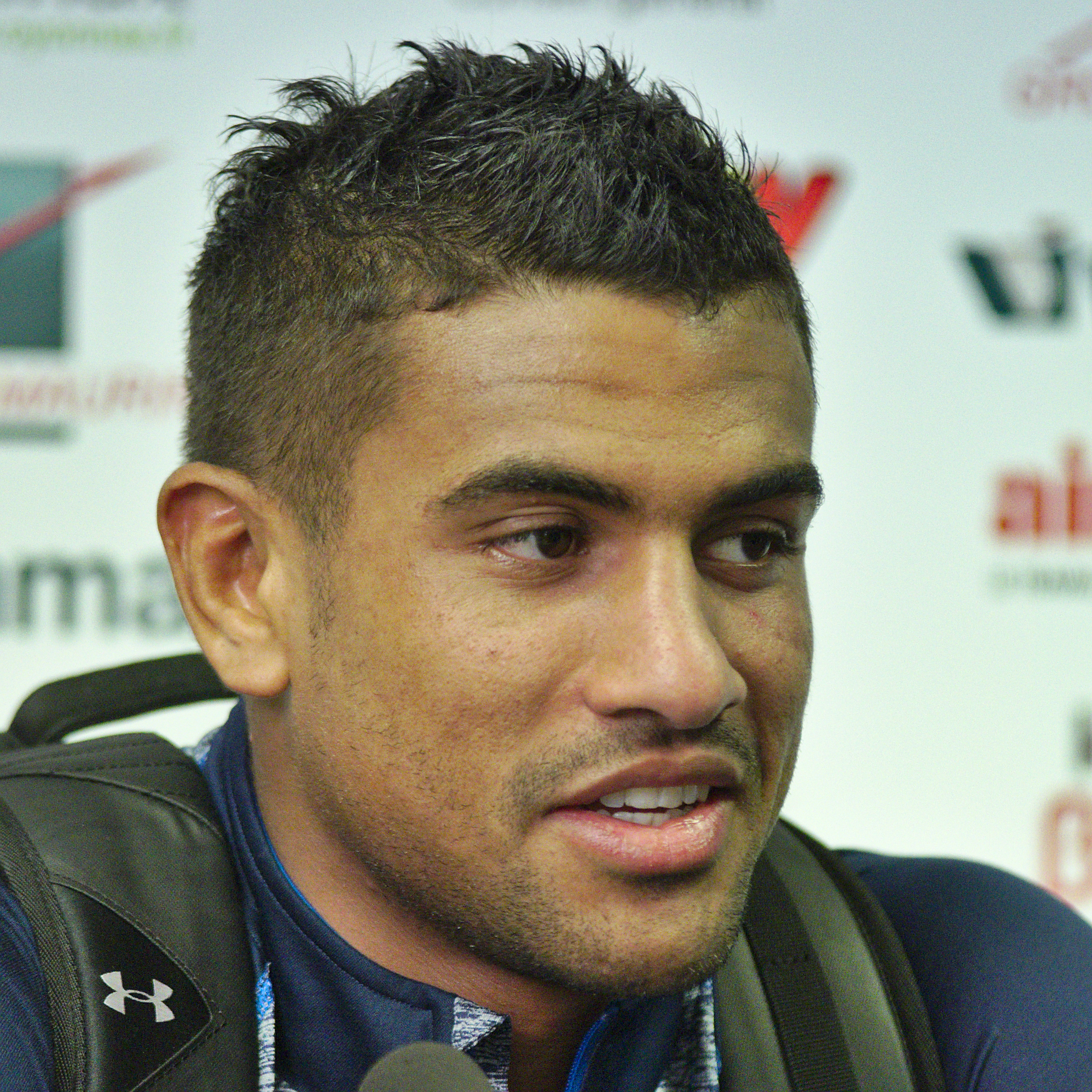
- Fofana in 2014
- Born: 20 January 1988 (age 38) Paris, France
- Height: 1.82 m (6 ft 0 in)
- Weight: 93 kg (14 st 9 lb; 205 lb)
- School: College Georges Braque

Rugby union career
- Position(s): Centre, Wing
Amateur team(s)
Years	Team	Apps	(Points)
2001–2003	USO Massif Central		
2003–2008	PUC		
Senior career
Years	Team	Apps	(Points)
2008–2022	Clermont	207	(340)
International career
Years	Team	Apps	(Points)
2012–2019	France	48	(75)

Wesley Fofana (born 20 January 1988) is a former French rugby union player, of Malian descent, who played his entire 14-year career for ASM Clermont Auvergne in the Top 14 and the France national rugby union team. He played as a wing or centre, and won the Top 14 with Clermont in 2010 and 2017. In France he is known as Le Guépard (The Cheetah) for his pace.

== Biography ==
Fofana joined ASM Clermont Auvergne's youth team in 2008. He made his senior debut in 2009 and then helped the club win the French championship the following year.

== International career ==
Fofana made his senior international debut for France in a Six Nations game against Italy in February 2012, scoring a try. He continued this excellent form, scoring in the next match versus Scotland and adding further scores against Ireland and then a 75th minute try against England scoring four tries in his first four ever international matches. In the 2013 six nations he scored a memorable 70 metres solo try against England in Twickenham from inside the French half evading several tackles on the way; however, England won the game 23–13.
