= 2011 Six Nations Championship squads =

Rugby union competition squads

This is a list of the complete squads for the 2011 Six Nations Championship, an annual rugby union tournament contested by the national rugby teams of England, France, Ireland, Italy, Scotland and Wales. Each country is entitled to name a squad of 39 players to contest the championship. They may also invite additional players along prior to the start of the championship, while the coach can call up replacement players if squad members suffer serious injury.

NB

- Ages are given as of 4 February 2011, the opening day of the tournament.
- All cap totals are as of the start of the tournament, and do not include appearances made during the competition.

== England ==
Martin Johnson announced a 33-man England squad for the 2011 Six Nations on 11 January.

Since the squad announcement, four players originally named have been ruled out for at least part of the Six Nations:

- Captain Lewis Moody suffered a knee injury that was initially believed to rule him out for the first three rounds of the competition. Moody has since stated that his recovery is progressing well enough that he hopes to play in England's third match against France on 26 February.
- Delon Armitage was banned for eight weeks by the Rugby Football Union after a physical confrontation with an anti-doping official on 1 January. His suspension ends on 16 March, three days before England's final match against Ireland.
- Two other players named to the squad, Tom Croft and Courtney Lawes, were injured, but Johnson apparently hoped they would be fit for the Six Nations. However, both have since been ruled out for at least the first month of the competition. Dave Attwood, who had been a strong contender for a place in the squad, was also unavailable, in his case due to a suspension.
- As a result of these injuries and suspensions, England called up four players as replacements on 24 January—lock George Skivington, loose forwards Phil Dowson and Tom Wood, and fullback Nick Abendanon. The call-up of two loose forwards also reflected a knee injury suffered by Hendre Fourie the previous weekend that was being evaluated by England's medical staff.
- Alex Corbisiero and James Simpson-Daniel were called up to cover for injuries to Payne and Abendanon.
- Chris Robshaw was called up to the training squad to cover for Joe Worsley.

Head coach: (England) Martin Johnson

Note: Flags indicate national union for the club/province as defined by World Rugby.

Player	Position	Date of birth (age)	Caps	Club/province
George Chuter	Hooker	9 July 1976 (aged 34)	24	(England) Leicester Tigers
Dylan Hartley	Hooker	24 March 1986 (aged 24)	23	(England) Northampton Saints
Steve Thompson	Hooker	15 July 1978 (aged 32)	61	(England) Leeds Carnegie
Dan Cole	Prop	9 May 1987 (aged 23)	11	(England) Leicester Tigers
Alex Corbisiero	Prop	30 August 1988 (aged 22)	0	(England) London Irish
Paul Doran-Jones	Prop	2 May 1985 (aged 25)	1	(England) Gloucester
Tim Payne	Prop	29 April 1979 (aged 31)	22	(England) London Wasps
Andrew Sheridan	Prop	1 November 1979 (aged 31)	36	(England) Sale Sharks
David Wilson	Prop	9 April 1985 (aged 25)	15	(England) Bath
Louis Deacon	Lock	7 October 1980 (aged 30)	18	(England) Leicester Tigers
Courtney Lawes	Lock	23 February 1989 (aged 21)	8	(England) Northampton Saints
Tom Palmer	Lock	27 March 1979 (aged 31)	20	(France) Stade Français
Simon Shaw	Lock	1 September 1973 (aged 37)	61	(England) London Wasps
George Skivington	Lock	3 December 1982 (aged 28)	0	(England) Leicester Tigers
Tom Croft	Flanker	7 November 1985 (aged 25)	22	(England) Leicester Tigers
Hendre Fourie	Flanker	19 September 1979 (aged 31)	4	(England) Leeds Carnegie
James Haskell	Flanker	2 April 1985 (aged 25)	29	(France) Stade Français
Lewis Moody (c)	Flanker	12 June 1978 (aged 32)	66	(England) Bath
Chris Robshaw	Flanker	4 June 1986 (aged 24)	1	(England) Harlequins
Tom Wood	Flanker	3 November 1986 (aged 24)	0	(England) Northampton Saints
Joe Worsley	Flanker	14 June 1977 (aged 33)	77	(England) London Wasps
Phil Dowson	Number 8	1 October 1981 (aged 29)	0	(England) Northampton Saints
Nick Easter	Number 8	15 August 1978 (aged 32)	38	(England) Harlequins
Danny Care	Scrum-half	2 January 1987 (aged 24)	25	(England) Harlequins
Joe Simpson	Scrum-half	5 July 1988 (aged 22)	0	(England) London Wasps
Ben Youngs	Scrum-half	5 September 1989 (aged 21)	7	(England) Leicester Tigers
Toby Flood	Fly-half	8 August 1985 (aged 25)	35	(England) Leicester Tigers
Charlie Hodgson	Fly-half	12 November 1980 (aged 30)	34	(England) Sale Sharks
Jonny Wilkinson	Fly-half	25 May 1979 (aged 31)	80	(France) Toulon
Riki Flutey	Centre	10 February 1980 (aged 30)	13	(England) London Wasps
Shontayne Hape	Centre	30 January 1981 (aged 30)	6	(England) Bath
Mike Tindall	Centre	18 October 1978 (aged 32)	66	(England) Gloucester
Chris Ashton	Wing	29 March 1987 (aged 23)	7	(England) Northampton Saints
Matt Banahan	Wing	30 December 1986 (aged 24)	7	(England) Bath
Mark Cueto	Wing	26 December 1979 (aged 31)	45	(England) Sale Sharks
James Simpson-Daniel	Wing	30 May 1982 (aged 28)	10	(England) Gloucester
David Strettle	Wing	23 July 1983 (aged 27)	6	(England) Saracens
Nick Abendanon	Fullback	27 August 1986 (aged 24)	2	(England) Bath
Ben Foden	Fullback	22 July 1985 (aged 25)	10	(England) Northampton Saints

== France ==
Marc Lièvremont announced a 30-man France squad for the 2011 Six Nations on 19 January.

Head coach: (France) Marc Lièvremont

Note: Flags indicate national union for the club/province as defined by World Rugby.

Player	Position	Date of birth (age)	Caps	Club/province
Guilhem Guirado	Hooker	17 June 1986 (aged 24)	6	(France) Perpignan
William Servat	Hooker	9 February 1978 (aged 32)	32	(France) Toulouse
Luc Ducalcon	Prop	2 January 1984 (aged 27)	3	(France) Castres
Thomas Domingo	Prop	20 August 1985 (aged 25)	13	(France) Clermont
Sylvain Marconnet	Prop	8 April 1976 (aged 34)	80	(France) Stade Français
Nicolas Mas	Prop	23 May 1980 (aged 30)	39	(France) Perpignan
Lionel Nallet	Lock	14 September 1976 (aged 34)	57	(France) Racing Métro
Jérôme Thion	Lock	2 December 1977 (aged 33)	50	(France) Biarritz
Pascal Papé	Lock	5 October 1980 (aged 30)	26	(France) Stade Français
Julien Pierre	Lock	31 July 1981 (aged 29)	12	(France) Clermont
Julien Bonnaire	Flanker	20 September 1978 (aged 32)	56	(France) Clermont
Thierry Dusautoir (c)	Flanker	18 November 1981 (aged 29)	37	(France) Toulouse
Alexandre Lapandry	Flanker	13 April 1989 (aged 21)	5	(France) Clermont
Fulgence Ouedraogo	Flanker	21 July 1986 (aged 24)	22	(France) Montpellier
Sébastien Chabal	Number 8	8 December 1977 (aged 33)	58	(France) Racing Métro
Imanol Harinordoquy	Number 8	20 February 1980 (aged 30)	64	(France) Biarritz
Morgan Parra	Scrum-half	15 November 1988 (aged 22)	22	(France) Clermont
Dimitri Yachvili	Scrum-half	19 September 1980 (aged 30)	47	(France) Biarritz
David Skrela	Fly-half	2 March 1979 (aged 31)	20	(France) Toulouse
François Trinh-Duc	Fly-half	11 November 1986 (aged 24)	22	(France) Montpellier
Yannick Jauzion	Centre	28 July 1978 (aged 32)	70	(France) Toulouse
David Marty	Centre	30 October 1982 (aged 28)	32	(France) Perpignan
Maxime Mermoz	Centre	28 July 1986 (aged 24)	7	(France) Perpignan
Aurélien Rougerie	Centre	26 September 1980 (aged 30)	59	(France) Clermont
Damien Traille	Centre	12 June 1979 (aged 31)	77	(France) Biarritz
Vincent Clerc	Wing	7 May 1981 (aged 29)	43	(France) Toulouse
Yoann Huget	Wing	2 June 1987 (aged 23)	2	(France) Bayonne
Maxime Médard	Wing	16 November 1986 (aged 24)	15	(France) Toulouse
Alexis Palisson	Fullback	9 September 1987 (aged 23)	12	(France) Brive
Clément Poitrenaud	Fullback	20 May 1982 (aged 28)	41	(France) Toulouse

== Ireland ==
Ireland named their squad for the 2011 Six Nations Championship on 19 January.

- Flannery, Hayes, Ferris, Heaslip, Bowe, Horgan and Trimble were ruled out of the first game at least. While McCarthy and Stringer were dropped. McLaughlin, O'Leary and McFadden were called up in their place.
- Wilkinson, Ryan, Spence, Hurley and J.Murphy were all called up ahead of the clash against France.
- Buckley was called up along with several other players ahead of the match against Scotland.
- Toner was called up along with other players ahead of the Wales match.

Head coach: (Ireland) Declan Kidney

Note: Flags indicate national union for the club/province as defined by World Rugby.

Player	Position	Date of birth (age)	Caps	Club/province
Rory Best	Hooker	15 August 1982 (aged 28)	42	(Ireland) Ulster
Seán Cronin	Hooker	6 May 1986 (aged 24)	7	(Ireland) Connacht
Jerry Flannery	Hooker	17 October 1978 (aged 32)	36	(Ireland) Munster
Tony Buckley	Prop	8 August 1980 (aged 30)	21	(Ireland) Munster
Tom Court	Prop	6 November 1980 (aged 30)	13	(Ireland) Ulster
John Hayes	Prop	2 November 1973 (aged 37)	104	(Ireland) Munster
Cian Healy	Prop	7 October 1987 (aged 23)	13	(Ireland) Leinster
Mike Ross	Prop	21 December 1979 (aged 31)	2	(Ireland) Leinster
Brett Wilkinson	Prop	29 November 1983 (aged 27)	0	(Ireland) Connacht
Leo Cullen	Lock	9 January 1978 (aged 33)	24	(Ireland) Leinster
Mike McCarthy	Lock	27 November 1981 (aged 29)	0	(Ireland) Connacht
Donncha O'Callaghan	Lock	24 March 1979 (aged 31)	67	(Ireland) Munster
Paul O'Connell (vc)	Lock	20 October 1979 (aged 31)	76	(Ireland) Munster
Mick O'Driscoll	Lock	8 October 1978 (aged 32)	22	(Ireland) Munster
Donnacha Ryan	Lock	11 December 1983 (aged 27)	7	(Ireland) Munster
Devin Toner	Lock	29 June 1986 (aged 24)	3	(Ireland) Leinster
Stephen Ferris	Flanker	2 August 1985 (aged 25)	24	(Ireland) Ulster
Shane Jennings	Flanker	8 July 1981 (aged 29)	9	(Ireland) Leinster
Denis Leamy	Flanker	27 November 1981 (aged 29)	46	(Ireland) Munster
Kevin McLaughlin	Flanker	20 September 1984 (age 42)	1	(Ireland) Leinster
Rhys Ruddock	Flanker	13 November 1990 (aged 20)	1	(Ireland) Leinster
David Wallace	Flanker	8 July 1976 (aged 34)	66	(Ireland) Munster
Jamie Heaslip	Number 8	15 December 1983 (aged 27)	31	(Ireland) Leinster
Seán O'Brien	Number 8	14 February 1987 (aged 23)	4	(Ireland) Leinster
Tomás O'Leary	Scrum-half	22 October 1983 (aged 27)	18	(Ireland) Munster
Eoin Reddan	Scrum-half	20 November 1980 (aged 30)	24	(Ireland) Leinster
Peter Stringer	Scrum-half	13 December 1977 (aged 33)	95	(Ireland) Munster
Ronan O'Gara	Fly-half	7 March 1977 (aged 33)	103	(Ireland) Munster
Johnny Sexton	Fly-half	11 July 1985 (aged 25)	11	(Ireland) Leinster
Gordon D'Arcy	Centre	10 February 1980 (aged 30)	52	(Ireland) Leinster
Brian O'Driscoll (c)	Centre	21 January 1979 (aged 32)	107	(Ireland) Leinster
Nevin Spence	Centre	26 April 1990 (aged 20)	0	(Ireland) Ulster
Paddy Wallace	Centre	27 August 1979 (aged 31)	23	(Ireland) Ulster
Tommy Bowe	Wing	22 February 1984 (aged 26)	36	(Wales) Ospreys
Keith Earls	Wing	2 October 1987 (aged 23)	13	(Ireland) Munster
Shane Horgan	Wing	18 July 1978 (aged 32)	65	(Ireland) Leinster
Denis Hurley	Wing	15 July 1984 (aged 26)	1	(Ireland) Munster
Fergus McFadden	Wing	17 June 1986 (aged 24)	0	(Ireland) Leinster
Johne Murphy	Wing	10 November 1984 (aged 26)	0	(Ireland) Munster
Andrew Trimble	Wing	20 October 1984 (aged 26)	31	(Ireland) Ulster
Gavin Duffy	Fullback	18 September 1981 (aged 29)	10	(Ireland) Connacht
Luke Fitzgerald	Fullback	13 September 1987 (aged 23)	16	(Ireland) Leinster

== Italy ==
Nick Mallett announced a preliminary 24-man squad on 17 January for Italy's first two matches against Ireland and England. Bernabò, Sole and M.Pratichetti were called up to the squad to cover for injuries. Gori suffered a dislocated shoulder in the opening game and is likely to miss the whole tournament. Fabio Semenzato replaced him. Carlo Festuccia was called up the squad before the game against England to cover for injuries. Lorenzo Cittadini was called in the squad, replacing Rouyet, ahead of the game against Wales. Vosawai and Tebaldi were also called up to cover for injuries.

Head coach: (South Africa) Nick Mallett

Note: Flags indicate national union for the club/province as defined by World Rugby.

Player	Position	Date of birth (age)	Caps	Club/province
Carlo Festuccia	Hooker	20 June 1980 (aged 30)	49	(France) Racing Métro
Leonardo Ghiraldini	Hooker	26 December 1984 (aged 26)	31	(Italy) Benetton Treviso
Fabio Ongaro	Hooker	23 September 1977 (aged 33)	74	(Italy) Aironi
Martin Castrogiovanni	Prop	21 October 1981 (aged 29)	71	(England) Leicester Tigers
Lorenzo Cittadini	Prop	17 December 1982 (aged 28)	4	(Italy) Benetton Treviso
Ignacio Fernandez Rouyet	Prop	21 December 1979 (aged 31)	7	(Italy) Benetton Treviso
Andrea Lo Cicero	Prop	7 May 1976 (aged 34)	81	(France) Racing Métro
Salvatore Perugini	Prop	6 March 1978 (aged 32)	75	(Italy) Aironi
Valerio Bernabò	Lock	3 March 1984 (aged 26)	15	(Italy) Benetton Treviso
Carlo Del Fava	Lock	1 July 1981 (aged 29)	48	(Italy) Aironi
Santiago Dellapè	Lock	9 May 1978 (aged 32)	60	(France) Racing Métro
Quintin Geldenhuys	Lock	19 June 1981 (aged 29)	16	(Italy) Aironi
Robert Barbieri	Flanker	5 June 1984 (aged 26)	10	(Italy) Benetton Treviso
Paul Derbyshire	Flanker	3 July 1986 (aged 24)	8	(Italy) Benetton Treviso
Josh Sole	Flanker	15 February 1980 (aged 30)	46	(Italy) Aironi
Alessandro Zanni	Flanker	31 January 1984 (aged 27)	47	(Italy) Benetton Treviso
Sergio Parisse (c)	Number 8	12 September 1983 (aged 27)	72	(France) Stade Français
Manoa Vosawai	Number 8	12 August 1983 (aged 27)	7	(Italy) Benetton Treviso
Pablo Canavosio	Scrum-half	26 December 1981 (aged 29)	32	(Italy) Aironi
Edoardo Gori	Scrum-half	5 March 1990 (aged 20)	2	(Italy) Benetton Treviso
Fabio Semenzato	Scrum-half	6 May 1986 (aged 24)	0	(Italy) Benetton Treviso
Tito Tebaldi	Scrum-half	23 September 1987 (aged 23)	14	(Italy) Aironi
Kris Burton	Fly-half	4 August 1980 (aged 30)	4	(Italy) Benetton Treviso
Luciano Orquera	Fly-half	12 October 1981 (aged 29)	17	(France) Brive
Gonzalo Canale	Centre	11 November 1982 (aged 28)	61	(France) Clermont
Gonzalo Garcia	Centre	18 February 1984 (aged 26)	18	(Italy) Benetton Treviso
Matteo Pratichetti	Centre	27 July 1985 (aged 25)	22	(Italy) Aironi
Alberto Sgarbi	Centre	26 November 1986 (aged 24)	8	(Italy) Benetton Treviso
Tommaso Benvenuti	Wing	12 December 1990 (aged 20)	3	(Italy) Benetton Treviso
Mirco Bergamasco	Wing	23 February 1983 (aged 27)	76	(France) Racing Métro
Andrea Masi	Wing	30 March 1981 (aged 29)	55	(France) Racing Métro
Luke McLean	Fullback	29 June 1987 (aged 23)	24	(Italy) Benetton Treviso

== Scotland ==
Andy Robinson named his squad for the Six Nations on 19 January. Alasdair Strokosch was called up to the squad after his return to full fitness.

Head coach: (England) Andy Robinson

Note: Flags indicate national union for the club/province as defined by World Rugby.

Player	Position	Date of birth (age)	Caps	Club/province
Ross Ford	Hooker	23 April 1984 (aged 26)	43	(Scotland) Edinburgh
Dougie Hall	Hooker	24 September 1980 (aged 30)	33	(Scotland) Glasgow Warriors
Scott Lawson	Hooker	28 September 1981 (aged 29)	23	(England) Gloucester
Geoff Cross	Prop	1 December 1982 (aged 28)	2	(Scotland) Edinburgh
Allan Jacobsen	Prop	22 September 1978 (aged 32)	50	(Scotland) Edinburgh
Moray Low	Prop	28 November 1984 (aged 26)	10	(Scotland) Glasgow Warriors
Euan Murray	Prop	7 August 1980 (aged 30)	35	(England) Newcastle Falcons
Jon Welsh	Prop	13 October 1986 (aged 24)	0	(Scotland) Glasgow Warriors
Richie Gray	Lock	24 August 1989 (aged 21)	6	(Scotland) Glasgow Warriors
Nathan Hines	Lock	29 November 1976 (aged 34)	67	(Ireland) Leinster
Alastair Kellock (c)	Lock	14 June 1981 (aged 29)	27	(Scotland) Glasgow Warriors
Scott MacLeod	Lock	3 March 1979 (aged 31)	23	(Scotland) Edinburgh
John Barclay	Flanker	24 November 1986 (aged 24)	23	(Scotland) Glasgow Warriors
Kelly Brown	Flanker	8 June 1982 (aged 28)	40	(England) Saracens
Rob Harley	Flanker	26 May 1990 (aged 20)	0	(Scotland) Glasgow Warriors
Ross Rennie	Flanker	29 March 1986 (aged 24)	4	(Scotland) Edinburgh
Alasdair Strokosch	Flanker	21 February 1983 (aged 27)	17	(England) Gloucester
Johnnie Beattie	Number 8	21 November 1985 (aged 25)	14	(Scotland) Glasgow Warriors
Richie Vernon	Number 8	7 July 1987 (aged 23)	6	(Scotland) Glasgow Warriors
Mike Blair	Scrum-half	20 April 1981 (aged 29)	66	(Scotland) Edinburgh
Rory Lawson	Scrum-half	12 March 1981 (aged 29)	22	(England) Gloucester
Greig Laidlaw	Scrum-half	12 October 1985 (aged 25)	1	(Scotland) Edinburgh
Ruaridh Jackson	Fly-half	12 February 1988 (aged 22)	2	(Scotland) Glasgow Warriors
Dan Parks	Fly-half	26 May 1978 (aged 32)	56	(Wales) Cardiff Blues
Joe Ansbro	Centre	29 October 1985 (aged 25)	2	(England) Northampton Saints
Nick De Luca	Centre	1 February 1984 (aged 27)	19	(Scotland) Edinburgh
Alex Grove	Centre	30 November 1987 (aged 23)	3	(England) Worcester Warriors
Sean Lamont	Centre	15 January 1981 (aged 30)	50	(Wales) Scarlets
Simon Danielli	Wing	8 November 1979 (aged 31)	26	(Ireland) Ulster
Max Evans	Wing	28 December 1983 (aged 27)	15	(Scotland) Glasgow Warriors
Rory Lamont	Wing	10 October 1982 (aged 28)	24	(France) Toulon
Nikki Walker	Wing	5 March 1982 (aged 28)	18	(Wales) Ospreys
Jack Cuthbert	Fullback	3 September 1987 (aged 23)	0	(England) Bath
Chris Paterson	Fullback	30 March 1978 (aged 32)	101	(Scotland) Edinburgh
Hugo Southwell	Fullback	14 May 1980 (aged 30)	57	(France) Stade Français

== Wales ==
Wales' 28-man squad for the 2011 Six Nations Championship was announced on 23 January.

Back-rower Taulupe Faletau, initially named to the squad, suffered an ankle injury on the day the squad was announced and was ruled out for a minimum of six weeks; his earliest possible return to the squad would be in Wales' fourth match against Ireland on 12 March. Faletau was replaced by Rob McCusker. Halfpenny was ruled out of the first game against England, his place in the squad was taken by Prydie. Chris Czekaj was called up to cover Stoddart's injury. After injury concerns to Matthew Rees, Huw Bennett joined the squad.

Head coach: (New Zealand) Warren Gatland

Note: Flags indicate national union for the club/province as defined by World Rugby.

Player	Position	Date of birth (age)	Caps	Club/province
Huw Bennett	Hooker	11 June 1983 (aged 27)	38	(Wales) Ospreys
Richard Hibbard	Hooker	13 December 1983 (aged 27)	9	(Wales) Ospreys
Matthew Rees (c)	Hooker	9 December 1980 (aged 30)	42	(Wales) Scarlets
Scott Andrews	Prop	1 August 1989 (aged 21)	0	(Wales) Cardiff Blues
Ryan Bevington	Prop	9 December 1988 (aged 22)	0	(Wales) Ospreys
Paul James	Prop	13 May 1982 (aged 28)	17	(Wales) Ospreys
Craig Mitchell	Prop	3 May 1986 (aged 24)	4	(Wales) Ospreys
John Yapp	Prop	9 April 1983 (aged 27)	17	(Wales) Cardiff Blues
Bradley Davies	Lock	9 January 1987 (aged 24)	17	(Wales) Cardiff Blues
Alun Wyn Jones	Lock	19 September 1985 (aged 25)	43	(Wales) Ospreys
Jonathan Thomas	Lock	27 December 1982 (aged 28)	62	(Wales) Ospreys
Dan Lydiate	Flanker	18 December 1987 (aged 23)	5	(Wales) Newport Gwent Dragons
Rob McCusker	Flanker	12 December 1985 (aged 25)	3	(Wales) Scarlets
Josh Turnbull	Flanker	12 March 1987 (aged 23)	0	(Wales) Scarlets
Sam Warburton	Flanker	5 October 1988 (aged 22)	9	(Wales) Cardiff Blues
Taulupe Faletau	Number 8	12 November 1990 (aged 20)	0	(Wales) Newport Gwent Dragons
Ryan Jones	Number 8	13 March 1981 (aged 29)	46	(Wales) Ospreys
Andy Powell	Number 8	23 August 1981 (aged 29)	16	(England) London Wasps
Tavis Knoyle	Scrum-half	2 June 1990 (aged 20)	1	(Wales) Scarlets
Dwayne Peel	Scrum-half	31 August 1981 (aged 29)	74	(England) Sale Sharks
Mike Phillips	Scrum-half	29 August 1982 (aged 28)	46	(Wales) Ospreys
Stephen Jones	Fly-half	8 December 1977 (aged 33)	95	(Wales) Scarlets
Rhys Priestland	Fly-half	7 January 1987 (aged 24)	0	(Wales) Scarlets
Jonathan Davies	Centre	5 April 1988 (aged 22)	7	(Wales) Scarlets
James Hook	Centre	27 June 1985 (aged 25)	47	(Wales) Ospreys
Jamie Roberts	Centre	8 November 1986 (aged 24)	24	(Wales) Cardiff Blues
Chris Czekaj	Wing	14 December 1985 (aged 25)	9	(Wales) Cardiff Blues
Leigh Halfpenny	Wing	22 December 1988 (aged 22)	17	(Wales) Cardiff Blues
Tom Prydie	Wing	23 February 1992 (aged 18)	4	(Wales) Ospreys
Morgan Stoddart	Wing	23 September 1984 (aged 26)	3	(Wales) Scarlets
Shane Williams	Wing	26 February 1977 (aged 33)	75	(Wales) Ospreys
Lee Byrne	Fullback	1 June 1980 (aged 30)	38	(Wales) Ospreys
