= 2011 Six Nations Championship =

Rugby tournament

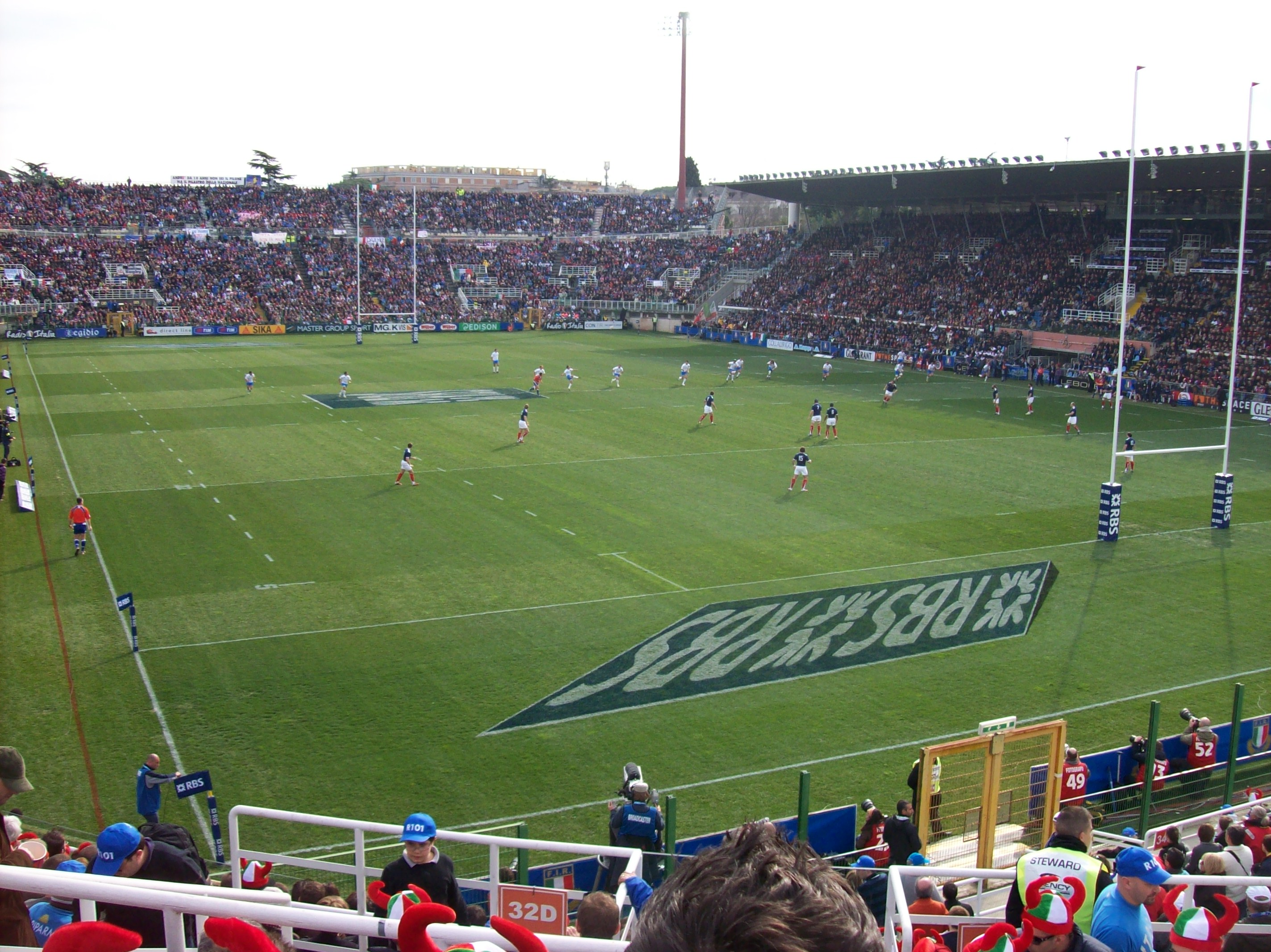
- Italy and France during the tournament at the Stadio Flaminio in Rome
- Date: 4 February – 19 March 2011
- Countries: England; France; Ireland; Italy; Scotland; Wales

Tournament statistics
- Champions: England (26th title)
- Matches played: 15
- Attendance: 920,618 (61,375 per match)
- Tries scored: 51 (3.4 per match)
- Top point scorer: (England) Toby Flood (50)
- Top try scorer: (England) Chris Ashton (6)
- Player of the tournament: (Italy) Andrea Masi

The 2011 Six Nations Championship, known as the 2011 RBS 6 Nations due to sponsorship by the Royal Bank of Scotland, was the 12th series of the Six Nations Championship, and the 117th edition of the international championship. The annual rugby union tournament was contested by England, France, Ireland, Italy, Scotland and Wales, and was won by England.

Ireland played their first Six Nations games at the Aviva Stadium, having played their first matches at the new stadium in November 2010.

For the first time in its history, the tournament opened with a Friday night fixture. For the first time in a decade, all of the teams had the same head coach as in the previous year's tournament.

This tournament was also notable for a major upset, with Italy beating 2010 champions France. Despite this upset, Italy still finished last, and was awarded the wooden spoon as a result. The champions were England, who won their first four matches, but were denied the Grand Slam and the Triple Crown by a defeat to Ireland.

Italy's Andrea Masi was named the Six Nations Player of the Championship, becoming the first Italian player to win the award with 30% of the voting. The runners up were Fabio Semenzato in second, Seán O'Brien in third and Toby Flood in fourth.

== Final results ==
England won the championship after winning four out of their five matches, losing against Ireland. Due to France defeating Wales in the final match of the tournament, England ended the tournament at the top of the table. Had England beaten Ireland it would have led to their first Grand Slam since 2003. Italy lost their final match against Scotland to claim the wooden spoon for the ninth time since entering the competition in 2000.

== Participants ==
Nation	Home stadium	City	Head coach	Captain
England	Twickenham Stadium	London	(England) Martin Johnson	Mike Tindall (Note: Replaced regular captain Lewis Moody, who was initially ruled out of at least the first two rounds of the competition with a knee injury. He returned to play for his club team, Bath, on 20 February, but his injury reportedly returned during a training session for England's third match against France, ultimately ruling him out of the rest of the Championship. Tindall suffered an ankle injury during England's fourth match against Scotland that ruled him out of their final match against Ireland; Nick Easter was named captain for that match in Tindall's absence.)
France	Stade de France	Saint-Denis	(France) Marc Lièvremont	Thierry Dusautoir
Ireland	Aviva Stadium	Dublin	(Ireland) Declan Kidney	Brian O'Driscoll
Italy	Stadio Flaminio	Rome	(South Africa) Nick Mallett	Sergio Parisse
Scotland	Murrayfield Stadium	Edinburgh	(England) Andy Robinson	Alastair Kellock
Wales	Millennium Stadium	Cardiff	(New Zealand) Warren Gatland	Matthew Rees

== Squads ==
See 2011 Six Nations Championship squads.

== Table ==
Pos	Team	Pld	W	D	L	PF	PA	PD	T	Pts
1	England	5	4	0	1	132	81	+51	13	8
2	France	5	3	0	2	117	91	+26	10	6
3	Ireland	5	3	0	2	93	81	+12	10	6
4	Wales	5	3	0	2	95	89	+6	6	6
5	Scotland	5	1	0	4	82	109	−27	6	2
6	Italy	5	1	0	4	70	138	−68	6	2

Source: ESPN

== Results ==
=== Round 1 ===
4 February 2011
19:45

Wales	19–26	England
Try: Stoddart 60' c Con: S. Jones (1/1); Pen: S. Jones (3/4) 23', 29', 43'; Hook (1/2) 70'	Report	Try: Ashton (2) 14' c, 56' c Con: Flood (2/2); Pen: Flood (3/3) 19', 32', 47'; Wilkinson (1/1) 75'

Millennium Stadium, Cardiff
Attendance: 74,276
Referee: Alain Rolland (Ireland)

FB	15	James Hook
RW	14	Morgan Stoddart
OC	13	Jamie Roberts
IC	12	Jonathan Davies
LW	11	Shane Williams
FH	10	Stephen Jones		(substituted off) 67'
SH	9	Mike Phillips		(substituted off) 69'
N8	8	Andy Powell		(substituted off) 33'
OF	7	Sam Warburton
BF	6	Dan Lydiate		(substituted off) 52'	(substituted in) 57'	(substituted off) 69'
RL	5	Alun Wyn Jones
LL	4	Bradley Davies
TP	3	Craig Mitchell	(yellow card) 46'			(substituted off) 71'
HK	2	Matthew Rees (c)		(substituted off) 70'
LP	1	Paul James
Replacements:
HK	16	Richard Hibbard		(substituted in) 70'
PR	17	John Yapp		(substituted in) 52'	(substituted off) 57'	(substituted in) 71'
N8	18	Ryan Jones		(substituted in) 33'
FL	19	Jonathan Thomas				(substituted in) 69'
SH	20	Dwayne Peel		(substituted in) 69'
FH	21	Rhys Priestland
FB	22	Lee Byrne		(substituted in) 67'
Coach:
(New Zealand) Warren Gatland

FB	15	Ben Foden
RW	14	Chris Ashton
OC	13	Mike Tindall (c)
IC	12	Shontayne Hape
LW	11	Mark Cueto
FH	10	Toby Flood		(substituted off) 63'
SH	9	Ben Youngs		(substituted off) 62'
N8	8	Nick Easter
OF	7	James Haskell		(substituted off) 62'
BF	6	Tom Wood
RL	5	Tom Palmer
LL	4	Louis Deacon	(yellow card) 27'	(substituted off) 69'
TP	3	Dan Cole
HK	2	Dylan Hartley		(substituted off) 69'
LP	1	Andrew Sheridan		(substituted off) 61'
Replacements:
HK	16	Steve Thompson		(substituted in) 69'
PR	17	David Wilson		(substituted in) 61'
LK	18	Simon Shaw		(substituted in) 69'
FL	19	Joe Worsley		(substituted in) 62'
SH	20	Danny Care		(substituted in) 62'
FH	21	Jonny Wilkinson		(substituted in) 63'
WG	22	Matt Banahan
Coach:
(England) Martin Johnson

Man of the Match:
Toby Flood (England)

Touch judges:
Alan Lewis (Ireland)
Simon McDowell (Ireland)
Television match official:
Jim Yuille (Scotland)

- Tom Wood (England) made his international debut.

5 February 2011
14:30

Italy	11–13	Ireland
Try: McLean 75' m Pen: Mi. Bergamasco (2/3) 6', 40'	Report	Try: O'Driscoll 44' c Con: Sexton (1/1); Pen: Sexton (1/1) 28'; Drop: O'Gara (1/1) 78'

Stadio Flaminio, Rome
Attendance: 32,000
Referee: Romain Poite (France)

FB	15	Luke McLean
RW	14	Andrea Masi
OC	13	Gonzalo Canale
IC	12	Alberto Sgarbi	(substituted off) 69'
LW	11	Mirco Bergamasco
FH	10	Kris Burton	(substituted off) 71'
SH	9	Edoardo Gori	(substituted off) 10'
N8	8	Sergio Parisse (c)
OF	7	Alessandro Zanni
BF	6	Josh Sole	(substituted off) 50'
RL	5	Quintin Geldenhuys
LL	4	Santiago Dellapè	(substituted off) 54'
TP	3	Martin Castrogiovanni
HK	2	Leonardo Ghiraldini	(substituted off) 64'
LP	1	Salvatore Perugini	36' to 40'		(substituted off) 64'
Replacements:
HK	16	Fabio Ongaro	(substituted in) 64'
PR	17	Andrea Lo Cicero	(substituted in) 36'	(substituted off) 40'	(substituted in) 64'
LK	18	Carlo Del Fava	(substituted in) 54'
FL	19	Valerio Bernabò	(substituted in) 50'
SH	20	Pablo Canavosio	(substituted in) 10'
FH	21	Luciano Orquera	(substituted in) 71'
CE	22	Gonzalo Garcia	(substituted in) 69'
Coach:
(South Africa) Nick Mallett

FB	15	Luke Fitzgerald
RW	14	Fergus McFadden
OC	13	Brian O'Driscoll (c)
IC	12	Gordon D'Arcy		(substituted off) 76'
LW	11	Keith Earls
FH	10	Johnny Sexton		(substituted off) 65'
SH	9	Tomás O'Leary		(substituted off) 55'
N8	8	Seán O'Brien
OF	7	David Wallace
BF	6	Denis Leamy	(yellow card) 73'
RL	5	Paul O'Connell		(substituted off) 73'
LL	4	Donncha O'Callaghan
TP	3	Mike Ross
HK	2	Rory Best		(substituted off) 76'
LP	1	Cian Healy		(substituted off) 76'
Replacements:
HK	16	Seán Cronin		(substituted in) 76'
PR	17	Tom Court		(substituted in) 76'
LK	18	Leo Cullen		(substituted in) 73'
FL	19	Shane Jennings
SH	20	Eoin Reddan		(substituted in) 55'
FH	21	Ronan O'Gara		(substituted in) 65'
CE	22	Paddy Wallace		(substituted in) 76'
Coach:
(Ireland) Declan Kidney

Man of the Match:
Seán O'Brien (Ireland)

Touch judges:
Jérôme Garcès (France)
David Changleng (Scotland)
Television match official:
Geoff Warren (England)

- Fergus McFadden (Ireland) made his international debut.

5 February 2011
17:00

France	34–21	Scotland
Try: Médard 2' c Penalty try 29' c Harinordoquy 54' c Traille 68' c Con: Parra (2/2); Yachvili (2/2); Pen: Yachvili (1/2) 79'; Drop: Trinh-Duc (1/1) 9'	Report	Try: Kellock 18' c Brown 60' c Lamont 75' c Con: Parks (2/2); Jackson (1/1)

Stade de France, Paris
Attendance: 78,595
Referee: Wayne Barnes (England)

FB	15	Damien Traille
RW	14	Yoann Huget
OC	13	Aurélien Rougerie
IC	12	Maxime Mermoz	(substituted off) 44'
LW	11	Maxime Médard	(substituted off) 73'
FH	10	François Trinh-Duc
SH	9	Morgan Parra	(substituted off) 52'
N8	8	Imanol Harinordoquy	(substituted off) 55'
OF	7	Julien Bonnaire
BF	6	Thierry Dusautoir (c)
RL	5	Lionel Nallet	(substituted off) 62'
LL	4	Julien Pierre
TP	3	Nicolas Mas	(substituted off) 52'
HK	2	William Servat	(substituted off) 57'
LP	1	Thomas Domingo
Replacements:
HK	16	Guilhem Guirado	(substituted in) 57'
PR	17	Luc Ducalcon	(substituted in) 52'
LK	18	Jérôme Thion	(substituted in) 62'
N8	19	Sébastien Chabal	(substituted in) 55'
SH	20	Dimitri Yachvili	(substituted in) 52'
FB	21	Clément Poitrenaud	(substituted in) 44'
WG	22	Vincent Clerc	(substituted in) 73'
Coach:
(France) Marc Lièvremont

FB	15	Hugo Southwell
RW	14	Nikki Walker
OC	13	Joe Ansbro
IC	12	Nick De Luca	(substituted off) 55'
LW	11	Max Evans
FH	10	Dan Parks	(substituted off) 69'
SH	9	Rory Lawson	(substituted off) 40'
N8	8	Kelly Brown
OF	7	John Barclay	(substituted off) 61'
BF	6	Nathan Hines	(substituted off) 55'
RL	5	Alastair Kellock (c)
LL	4	Richie Gray
TP	3	Euan Murray	(substituted off) 70'
HK	2	Ross Ford	(substituted off) 73'
LP	1	Allan Jacobsen
Replacements:
HK	16	Dougie Hall	(substituted in) 73'
PR	17	Moray Low	(substituted in) 70'
N8	18	Richie Vernon	(substituted in) 56'
FL	19	Ross Rennie	(substituted in) 61'
SH	20	Mike Blair	(substituted in) 40'
FH	21	Ruaridh Jackson	(substituted in) 69'
WG	22	Sean Lamont	(substituted in) 55'
Coach:
(England) Andy Robinson

Man of the Match:
Maxime Médard (France)

Touch judges:
Andrew Small (England)
Stuart Terheege (England)
Television match official:
Giulio De Santis (Italy)

=== Round 2 ===
12 February 2011
14:30

England	59–13	Italy
Try: Ashton (4) 3' c, 25' c, 54' c, 76' c Cueto 30' c Tindall 35' c Care 58' c Haskell 72' c Con: Flood (5/5); Wilkinson (3/3); Pen: Flood (1/1) 10'	Report	Try: Ongaro 70' c Con: Bergamasco (1/1); Pen: Bergamasco (2/3) 4', 12'

Twickenham Stadium, London
Attendance: 80,810
Referee: Craig Joubert (South Africa)

FB	15	Ben Foden
RW	14	Chris Ashton
OC	13	Mike Tindall (c)
IC	12	Shontayne Hape
LW	11	Mark Cueto	(substituted off) 49'
FH	10	Toby Flood	(substituted off) 55'
SH	9	Ben Youngs	(substituted off) 55'
N8	8	Nick Easter
OF	7	James Haskell
BF	6	Tom Wood	(substituted off) 61'
RL	5	Tom Palmer
LL	4	Louis Deacon	(substituted off) 45'
TP	3	Dan Cole	(substituted off) 61'
HK	2	Dylan Hartley	(substituted off) 49'
LP	1	Alex Corbisiero
Replacements:
HK	16	Steve Thompson	(substituted in) 49'
PR	17	David Wilson	(substituted in) 61'
LK	18	Simon Shaw	(substituted in) 45'
FL	19	Hendre Fourie	(substituted in) 61'
SH	20	Danny Care	(substituted in) 55'
FH	21	Jonny Wilkinson	(substituted in) 55'
WG	22	Matt Banahan	(substituted in) 49'
Coach:
(England) Martin Johnson

FB	15	Luke McLean		(substituted off) 79'
RW	14	Andrea Masi		(substituted off) 62'
OC	13	Gonzalo Canale
IC	12	Alberto Sgarbi		(substituted off) 58'
LW	11	Mirco Bergamasco
FH	10	Luciano Orquera
SH	9	Fabio Semenzato
N8	8	Sergio Parisse
OF	7	Alessandro Zanni
BF	6	Valerio Bernabò		(substituted off) 53'
RL	5	Quintin Geldenhuys
LL	4	Carlo Del Fava		(substituted off) 46'
TP	3	Martin Castrogiovanni	(yellow card) 43'	(substituted off) 56'
HK	2	Leonardo Ghiraldini		(substituted off) 66'
LP	1	Salvatore Perugini
Replacements:
HK	16	Fabio Ongaro		(substituted in) 66'
PR	17	Andrea Lo Cicero		(substituted in) 56'
LK	18	Santiago Dellapè		(substituted in) 46'
FL	19	Robert Barbieri		(substituted in) 53'
SH	20	Pablo Canavosio		(substituted in) 62'
FH	21	Kris Burton		(substituted in) 79'
CE	22	Gonzalo Garcia		(substituted in) 58'
Coach:
(South Africa) Nick Mallett

Man of the Match:
Chris Ashton (England)

Touch judges:
Peter Fitzgibbon (Ireland)
Peter Allan (Scotland)
Television match official:
Tony Redmond (Ireland)

- Chris Ashton's four-try performance marked a number of milestones:
  - He became the first player of any nation to score four tries in a Six Nations match since the competition expanded in 2000.
  - He also became the first England player to have scored four tries in a Six Nations, Five Nations, or Home Nations match since Ronald Poulton-Palmer scored four against France in 1914.
  - His six tries in the tournament equalled the single-season record in the Six Nations era, shared by Will Greenwood of England in 2001 and Shane Williams of Wales in 2008.
- Carlo Del Fava earned his 50th cap
- Alex Corbisiero (England) and Fabio Semenzato (Italy) made their international debuts.

12 February 2011
17:00

Scotland	6–24	Wales
Pen: Parks (2/3) 31', 58'	Report	Try: Williams (2) 8' c, 70' m Con: Hook (1/1); Pen: Hook (4/5) 13', 18', 21', 65'

Murrayfield Stadium, Edinburgh
Attendance: 60,259
Referee: George Clancy (Ireland)

FB	15	Hugo Southwell	(substituted off) 20'
RW	14	Nikki Walker
OC	13	Joe Ansbro
IC	12	Nick De Luca
LW	11	Max Evans
FH	10	Dan Parks
SH	9	Rory Lawson	(substituted off) 46'
N8	8	Richie Vernon
OF	7	John Barclay	(substituted off) 67'
BF	6	Kelly Brown
RL	5	Alastair Kellock (c)	(substituted off) 71'
LL	4	Nathan Hines
TP	3	Euan Murray	(substituted off) 46'
HK	2	Ross Ford	(substituted off) 67'
LP	1	Allan Jacobsen
Replacements:
HK	16	Scott Lawson	(substituted in) 67'
PR	17	Moray Low	(substituted in) 46'
LK	18	Scott MacLeod	(substituted in) 71'
FL	19	Ross Rennie	(substituted in) 67'
SH	20	Mike Blair	(substituted in) 46'
FH	21	Ruaridh Jackson
WG	22	Sean Lamont	(substituted in) 20'
Coach:
(England) Andy Robinson

FB	15	Lee Byrne	(yellow card) 27'	(substituted off) 76'
RW	14	Morgan Stoddart
OC	13	Jamie Roberts
IC	12	Jonathan Davies
LW	11	Shane Williams
FH	10	James Hook		(substituted off) 66'
SH	9	Mike Phillips		(substituted off) 75'
N8	8	Ryan Jones
OF	7	Sam Warburton
BF	6	Dan Lydiate		(substituted off) 53'
RL	5	Alun Wyn Jones		(substituted off) 71'
LL	4	Bradley Davies	(yellow card) 23'
TP	3	Craig Mitchell
HK	2	Matthew Rees (c)		(substituted off) 75'
LP	1	Paul James		(substituted off) 66'
Replacements:
HK	16	Richard Hibbard		(substituted in) 75'
PR	17	John Yapp		(substituted in) 66'
LK	18	Jonathan Thomas		(substituted in) 53'
FL	19	Josh Turnbull		(substituted in) 71'
SH	20	Tavis Knoyle		(substituted in) 75'
FH	21	Stephen Jones		(substituted in) 66'
FB	22	Rhys Priestland		(substituted in) 76'
Coach:
(New Zealand) Warren Gatland

Man of the Match:
Sam Warburton (Wales)

Touch judges:
Romain Poite (France)
Simon McDowell (Ireland)
Television match official:
Graham Hughes (England)

- Josh Turnbull and Rhys Priestland (both Wales) made their international debuts.

13 February 2011
15:00

Ireland	22–25	France
Try: McFadden 4' c O'Leary 37' m Heaslip 67' c Con: Sexton (1/2); O'Gara (1/1); Pen: Sexton (1/1) 15'	Report	Try: Médard 54' c Con: Yachvili (1/1); Pen: Parra (5/5) 10', 18', 20', 27', 48'; Yachvili (1/2) 62'

Aviva Stadium, Dublin
Attendance: 51,000
Referee: Dave Pearson (England)

FB	15	Luke Fitzgerald
RW	14	Fergus McFadden
OC	13	Brian O'Driscoll (c)
IC	12	Gordon D'Arcy
LW	11	Keith Earls
FH	10	Johnny Sexton	(substituted off) 62'
SH	9	Tomás O'Leary	(substituted off) 68'
N8	8	Jamie Heaslip
OF	7	David Wallace
BF	6	Seán O'Brien
RL	5	Paul O'Connell	(substituted off) 80'
LL	4	Donncha O'Callaghan
TP	3	Mike Ross
HK	2	Rory Best	(substituted off) 75'
LP	1	Cian Healy	(substituted off) 56'
Replacements:
HK	16	Seán Cronin	(substituted in) 75'
PR	17	Tom Court	(substituted in) 56'
LK	18	Leo Cullen	(substituted in) 80'
FL	19	Denis Leamy
SH	20	Eoin Reddan	(substituted in) 68'
FH	21	Ronan O'Gara	(substituted in) 62'
CE	22	Paddy Wallace
Coach:
(Ireland) Declan Kidney

FB	15	Clément Poitrenaud	(substituted off) 50'
RW	14	Yoann Huget
OC	13	Aurélien Rougerie
IC	12	Damien Traille	(substituted off) 72'
LW	11	Maxime Médard
FH	10	François Trinh-Duc
SH	9	Morgan Parra	(substituted off) 53'
N8	8	Imanol Harinordoquy
OF	7	Julien Bonnaire	(substituted off) 53'
BF	6	Thierry Dusautoir (c)
RL	5	Lionel Nallet
LL	4	Julien Pierre	(substituted off) 63'
TP	3	Nicolas Mas
HK	2	William Servat
LP	1	Thomas Domingo	(substituted off) 49'
Replacements:
HK	16	Guilhem Guirado
PR	17	Sylvain Marconnet	(substituted in) 49'
LK	18	Jérôme Thion	(substituted in) 63'
N8	19	Sébastien Chabal	(substituted in) 53'
SH	20	Dimitri Yachvili	(substituted in) 53'
CE	21	Yannick Jauzion	(substituted in) 72'
WG	22	Vincent Clerc	(substituted in) 50'
Coach:
(France) Marc Lièvremont

Man of the Match:
Thierry Dusautoir (France)

Touch judges:
Wayne Barnes (England)
David Changleng (Scotland)
Television match official:
Geoff Warren (England)

=== Round 3 ===
26 February 2011
14:30

Italy	16–24	Wales
Try: Canale 5' m Parisse 52' m Pen: Bergamasco (2/2) 12', 26'	Report	Try: Stoddart 9' m Warburton 13' c Con: S. Jones (1/2); Pen: S. Jones (3/3) 3', 38', 40+2'; Drop: Hook (1/1) 73'

Stadio Flaminio, Rome
Attendance: 32,000
Referee: Wayne Barnes (England)

FB	15	Luke McLean
RW	14	Andrea Masi	(substituted off) 73'
OC	13	Gonzalo Canale
IC	12	Alberto Sgarbi
LW	11	Mirco Bergamasco
FH	10	Kris Burton	(substituted off) 64'
SH	9	Fabio Semenzato	(substituted off) 71'
N8	8	Sergio Parisse (c)
OF	7	Robert Barbieri	(substituted off) 72'
BF	6	Alessandro Zanni
RL	5	Quintin Geldenhuys
LL	4	Santiago Dellapè	(substituted off) 52'
TP	3	Martin Castrogiovanni		(substituted off) 70'
HK	2	Leonardo Ghiraldini
LP	1	Salvatore Perugini	(substituted off) 40'	(substituted in) 70'
Replacements:
HK	16	Carlo Festuccia
PR	17	Andrea Lo Cicero	(substituted in) 40'
LK	18	Valerio Bernabò	(substituted in) 52'
N8	19	Manoa Vosawai	(substituted in) 72'
SH	20	Pablo Canavosio	(substituted in) 71'
FH	21	Luciano Orquera	(substituted in) 64'
WG	22	Tommaso Benvenuti	(substituted in) 73'
Coach:
(South Africa) Nick Mallett

FB	15	Lee Byrne
RW	14	Morgan Stoddart
OC	13	James Hook
IC	12	Jamie Roberts
LW	11	Shane Williams
FH	10	Stephen Jones
SH	9	Mike Phillips
N8	8	Ryan Jones
OF	7	Sam Warburton
BF	6	Dan Lydiate
RL	5	Alun Wyn Jones
LL	4	Bradley Davies
TP	3	Craig Mitchell
HK	2	Matthew Rees (c)	(substituted off) 77'
LP	1	Paul James
Replacements:
HK	16	Richard Hibbard	(substituted in) 77'
PR	17	John Yapp
N8	18	Jonathan Thomas
FL	19	Josh Turnbull
SH	20	Tavis Knoyle
FH	21	Rhys Priestland
WG	22	Leigh Halfpenny
Coach:
(New Zealand) Warren Gatland

Man of the Match:
Fabio Semenzato (Italy)

Touch judges:
Dave Pearson (England)
John Lacey (Ireland)
Television match official:
Iain Ramage (Scotland)

- Alessandro Zanni (Italy) and James Hook (Wales) each earned their 50th caps.

26 February 2011
17:00

England	17–9	France
Try: Foden 42' m Pen: Flood (3/3) 5', 13', 17'; Wilkinson (1/1) 52'	Report	Pen: Yachvili (3/5) 7', 19', 22'

Twickenham Stadium, London
Attendance: 82,107
Referee: George Clancy (Ireland)

FB	15	Ben Foden
RW	14	Chris Ashton
OC	13	Mike Tindall (c)
IC	12	Shontayne Hape	(substituted off) 76'
LW	11	Mark Cueto
FH	10	Toby Flood	(substituted off) 51'
SH	9	Ben Youngs	(substituted off) 65'
N8	8	Nick Easter
OF	7	James Haskell
BF	6	Tom Wood
RL	5	Tom Palmer
LL	4	Louis Deacon	(substituted off) 71'
TP	3	Dan Cole	(substituted off) 76'
HK	2	Dylan Hartley	(substituted off) 67'
LP	1	Andrew Sheridan	(substituted off) 23'
Replacements:
HK	16	Steve Thompson	(substituted in) 67'
PR	17	Alex Corbisiero	(substituted in) 23'
LK	18	Simon Shaw	(substituted in) 71'
FL	19	Hendre Fourie	(substituted in) 76'
SH	20	Danny Care	(substituted in) 65'
FH	21	Jonny Wilkinson	(substituted in) 51'
WG	22	Matt Banahan	(substituted in) 76'
Coach:
(England) Martin Johnson

FB	15	Clément Poitrenaud	(substituted off) 51'
RW	14	Yoann Huget
OC	13	Aurélien Rougerie
IC	12	Yannick Jauzion
LW	11	Vincent Clerc
FH	10	François Trinh-Duc	(substituted off) 67'
SH	9	Dimitri Yachvili	(substituted off) 62'
N8	8	Sébastien Chabal	(substituted off) 51'
OF	7	Imanol Harinordoquy
BF	6	Thierry Dusautoir (c)
RL	5	Lionel Nallet
LL	4	Julien Pierre	(substituted off) 62'
TP	3	Nicolas Mas
HK	2	William Servat	(substituted off) 76'
LP	1	Thomas Domingo	(substituted off) 60'
Replacements:
HK	16	Guilhem Guirado	(substituted in) 76'
PR	17	Sylvain Marconnet	(substituted in) 60'
LK	18	Jérôme Thion	(substituted in) 62'
FL	19	Julien Bonnaire	(substituted in) 51'
SH	20	Morgan Parra	(substituted in) 62'
UB	21	Damien Traille	(substituted in) 51'
FB	22	Alexis Palisson	(substituted in) 67'
Coach:
(France) Marc Lièvremont

Man of the Match:
Tom Palmer (England)

Touch judges:
Alan Lewis (Ireland)
Tim Hayes (Wales)
Television match official:
Giulio De Santis (Italy)

- Dimitri Yachvili (France) earned his 50th cap.
- Jonny Wilkinson's 52nd-minute penalty for England made him the leading point scorer in international rugby, overtaking Dan Carter.

27 February 2011
15:00

Scotland	18–21	Ireland
Pen: Paterson 16', 17', 32', 58'; Parks 66'; Drop: Parks 70'	Report	Try: Heaslip 6' c Reddan 29' c O'Gara 53' c Con: O'Gara (3/3)

Murrayfield Stadium, Edinburgh
Attendance: 63,082
Referee: Nigel Owens (Wales)

FB	15	Chris Paterson
RW	14	Nikki Walker		(substituted off) 74'
OC	13	Nick De Luca
IC	12	Sean Lamont
LW	11	Max Evans
FH	10	Ruaridh Jackson		(substituted off) 53'
SH	9	Mike Blair		(substituted off) 60'
N8	8	Johnnie Beattie		(substituted off) 46'	(substituted in) 55'	(substituted off) 55'
OF	7	John Barclay		(substituted off) 66'
BF	6	Kelly Brown
RL	5	Alastair Kellock (c)
LL	4	Richie Gray
TP	3	Moray Low		(substituted off) 66'
HK	2	Ross Ford		(substituted off) 53'
LP	1	Allan Jacobsen	(yellow card) 44'
Replacements:
HK	16	Scott Lawson		(substituted in) 53'
PR	17	Geoff Cross		(substituted in) 46'	(substituted off) 55'	(substituted in) 66'
LK	18	Nathan Hines		(substituted in) 66'
N8	19	Richie Vernon		(substituted in) 55'
SH	20	Rory Lawson		(substituted in) 60'
FH	21	Dan Parks		(substituted in) 53'
WG	22	Simon Danielli		(substituted in) 74'
Coach:
(England) Andy Robinson

FB	15	Luke Fitzgerald
RW	14	Tommy Bowe
OC	13	Brian O'Driscoll (c)
IC	12	Gordon D'Arcy
LW	11	Keith Earls
FH	10	Ronan O'Gara	(substituted off) 67'
SH	9	Eoin Reddan	(substituted off) 60'
N8	8	Jamie Heaslip
OF	7	David Wallace	(substituted off) 60'
BF	6	Seán O'Brien
RL	5	Paul O'Connell
LL	4	Donncha O'Callaghan	(substituted off) 66'
TP	3	Mike Ross	(substituted off) 70'
HK	2	Rory Best	(substituted off) 60'
LP	1	Cian Healy
Replacements:
HK	16	Seán Cronin	(substituted in) 60'
PR	17	Tom Court	(substituted in) 70'
LK	18	Leo Cullen	(substituted in) 66'
FL	19	Denis Leamy	(substituted in) 60'
SH	20	Peter Stringer	(substituted in) 60'
FH	21	Johnny Sexton	(substituted in) 67'
CE	22	Paddy Wallace
Coach:
(Ireland) Declan Kidney

Man of the Match:
Ronan O'Gara (Ireland)

Touch judges:
Andrew Small (England)
Pascal Gaüzère (France)
Television match official:
Graham Hughes (England)

=== Round 4 ===
12 March 2011
14:30

Italy	22–21	France
Try: Masi 59' c Con: Bergamasco (1/1); Pen: Bergamasco (5/7) 1', 23', 63', 70', 75'	Report	Try: Clerc 14' m Parra 50' c Con: Parra (1/2); Pen: Parra (3/4) 19', 44', 66'

Stadio Flaminio, Rome
Attendance: 34,000
Referee: Bryce Lawrence (New Zealand)

FB	15	Andrea Masi
RW	14	Tommaso Benvenuti
OC	13	Gonzalo Canale
IC	12	Gonzalo Garcia
LW	11	Mirco Bergamasco
FH	10	Luciano Orquera	(substituted off) 57'
SH	9	Fabio Semenzato
N8	8	Sergio Parisse (c)
OF	7	Robert Barbieri	(substituted off) 57'
BF	6	Alessandro Zanni
RL	5	Carlo Del Fava
LL	4	Santiago Dellapè	(substituted off) 53'
TP	3	Martin Castrogiovanni
HK	2	Carlo Festuccia	(substituted off) 47'
LP	1	Andrea Lo Cicero	(substituted off) 47'
Replacements:
HK	16	Leonardo Ghiraldini	(substituted in) 47'
PR	17	Salvatore Perugini	(substituted in) 47'
LK	18	Quintin Geldenhuys	(substituted in) 53'
FL	19	Paul Derbyshire	(substituted in) 57'
SH	20	Pablo Canavosio
FH	21	Kris Burton	(substituted in) 57'
FB	22	Luke McLean
Coach:
(South Africa) Nick Mallett

FB	15	Maxime Médard
RW	14	Yoann Huget
OC	13	Aurélien Rougerie
IC	12	Yannick Jauzion	(substituted off) 70'
LW	11	Vincent Clerc
FH	10	François Trinh-Duc
SH	9	Morgan Parra
N8	8	Sébastien Chabal	(substituted off) 56'
OF	7	Julien Bonnaire
BF	6	Thierry Dusautoir (c)
RL	5	Lionel Nallet	(substituted off) 56'
LL	4	Julien Pierre
TP	3	Nicolas Mas	(substituted off) 40'
HK	2	William Servat	(substituted off) 61'
LP	1	Sylvain Marconnet
Replacements:
HK	16	Guilhem Guirado	(substituted in) 61'
PR	17	Luc Ducalcon	(substituted in) 40'
LK	18	Jérôme Thion	(substituted in) 56'
N8	19	Imanol Harinordoquy	(substituted in) 56'
SH	20	Julien Tomas
CE	21	Damien Traille	(substituted in) 70'
FB	22	Clément Poitrenaud
Coach:
(France) Marc Lièvremont

Man of the Match:
Andrea Masi (Italy)

Touch judges:
Peter Fitzgibbon (Ireland)
Stuart Terheege (England)
Television match official:
Jim Yuille (Scotland)

- Carlo Festuccia earned his 50th cap
- This was the first time Italy had ever beaten France at home, and the first time they had won the Giuseppe Garibaldi Trophy.

12 March 2011
17:00

Wales	19–13	Ireland
Try: Phillips 50' c Con: Hook (1/1); Pen: Hook (3/4) 19', 27', 68'; Halfpenny (1/1) 38'	Report	Try: O'Driscoll 2' c Con: O'Gara (1/1); Pen: O'Gara (2/2) 32', 40'

Millennium Stadium, Cardiff
Attendance: 74,233
Referee: Jonathan Kaplan (South Africa)

FB	15	Lee Byrne
RW	14	Leigh Halfpenny
OC	13	Jamie Roberts
IC	12	Jonathan Davies
LW	11	Shane Williams
FH	10	James Hook
SH	9	Mike Phillips
N8	8	Ryan Jones	(substituted off) 59'
OF	7	Sam Warburton
BF	6	Dan Lydiate
RL	5	Alun Wyn Jones
LL	4	Bradley Davies
TP	3	Craig Mitchell	(substituted off) 12'
HK	2	Matthew Rees (c)	(substituted off) 71'
LP	1	Paul James
Replacements:
HK	16	Richard Hibbard	(substituted in) 71'
PR	17	John Yapp	(substituted in) 12'
N8	18	Jonathan Thomas	(substituted in) 59'
FL	19	Rob McCusker
SH	20	Dwayne Peel
FH	21	Stephen Jones
WG	22	Morgan Stoddart
Coach:
(New Zealand) Warren Gatland

FB	15	Luke Fitzgerald	(substituted off) 72'
RW	14	Tommy Bowe
OC	13	Brian O'Driscoll (c)
IC	12	Gordon D'Arcy
LW	11	Keith Earls
FH	10	Ronan O'Gara	(substituted off) 49'
SH	9	Eoin Reddan	(substituted off) 1'
N8	8	Jamie Heaslip	(substituted off) 69'
OF	7	David Wallace
BF	6	Seán O'Brien
RL	5	Paul O'Connell
LL	4	Donncha O'Callaghan	(substituted off) 75'
TP	3	Mike Ross	(substituted off) 68'
HK	2	Rory Best	(substituted off) 75'
LP	1	Cian Healy
Replacements:
HK	16	Seán Cronin	(substituted in) 75'
PR	17	Tom Court	(substituted in) 68'
LK	18	Leo Cullen	(substituted in) 75'
N8	19	Denis Leamy	(substituted in) 69'
SH	20	Peter Stringer	(substituted in) 1'
FH	21	Johnny Sexton	(substituted in) 49'
CE	22	Paddy Wallace	(substituted in) 72'
Coach:
(Ireland) Declan Kidney

Man of the Match:
James Hook (Wales)

Touch judges:
Craig Joubert (South Africa)
Peter Allan (Scotland)
Television match official:
Geoff Warren (England)

- Mike Phillips (Wales) earned his 50th cap.
- Brian O'Driscoll's try gave him 24 career tries in the Championship, equalling the all-time record of Ian Smith of Scotland, amassed in the Five Nations and Home Nations between 1924 and 1933.
- Ronan O'Gara became the fifth player in rugby history with 1,000 career Test points, reaching the mark with his conversion of O'Driscoll's try.
- The officials were heavily criticised for allowing the Wales try as it was scored following a quick throw-in after the ball went out on the full, with a different ball. A quick throw-in must be taken with the same ball without it being touched after going over the touchline.

13 March 2011
15:00

England	22–16	Scotland
Try: Croft 67' c Con: Wilkinson (1/1); Pen: Flood (4/5) 15', 23', 29', 57'; Wilkinson (1/1) 79'	Report	Try: Evans 74 'c Con: Paterson (1/1); Pen: Paterson (2/2) 3', 20'; Drop: Jackson (1/1) 40'

Twickenham Stadium, London
Attendance: 82,120
Referee: Romain Poite (France)

FB	15	Ben Foden
RW	14	Chris Ashton
OC	13	Mike Tindall (c)	(substituted off) 40'
IC	12	Shontayne Hape
LW	11	Mark Cueto
FH	10	Toby Flood	(substituted off) 65'
SH	9	Ben Youngs	(substituted off) 54'
N8	8	Nick Easter
OF	7	James Haskell
BF	6	Tom Wood	(substituted off) 65'
RL	5	Tom Palmer
LL	4	Louis Deacon	(substituted off) 65'
TP	3	Dan Cole	(substituted off) 74'
HK	2	Dylan Hartley	(substituted off) 65'
LP	1	Alex Corbisiero
Replacements:
HK	16	Steve Thompson	(substituted in) 65'
PR	17	Paul Doran-Jones	(substituted in) 74'
LK	18	Simon Shaw	(substituted in) 65'
FL	19	Tom Croft	(substituted in) 65'
SH	20	Danny Care	(substituted in) 54'
FH	21	Jonny Wilkinson	(substituted in) 65'
CE	22	Matt Banahan	(substituted in) 40'
Coach:
(England) Martin Johnson

FB	15	Chris Paterson
RW	14	Simon Danielli
OC	13	Joe Ansbro		(substituted off) 72'
IC	12	Sean Lamont
LW	11	Max Evans
FH	10	Ruaridh Jackson		(substituted off) 54'
SH	9	Rory Lawson		(substituted off) 54'
N8	8	Kelly Brown		(substituted off) 42'
OF	7	John Barclay	(yellow card) 56'
BF	6	Nathan Hines		(substituted off) 68'
RL	5	Alastair Kellock (c)
LL	4	Richie Gray
TP	3	Moray Low		(substituted off) 52'
HK	2	Ross Ford		(substituted off) 65'
LP	1	Allan Jacobsen
Replacements:
HK	16	Scott Lawson		(substituted in) 65'
PR	17	Geoff Cross		(substituted in) 52'
N8	18	Richie Vernon		(substituted in) 42'
FL	19	Alasdair Strokosch		(substituted in) 68'
SH	20	Mike Blair		(substituted in) 54'
FH	21	Dan Parks		(substituted in) 54'
CE	22	Nick De Luca		(substituted in) 72'
Coach:
(England) Andy Robinson

Man of the Match:
James Haskell (England)

Touch judges:
Jérôme Garcès (France)
Carlo Damasco (Italy)
Television match official:
Tony Redmond (Ireland)

- In the 58th minute, referee Poite was replaced by Jérôme Garcès due to injury. Andrew Small (England) replaced Garcès as touch judge.

=== Round 5 ===
19 March 2011
14:30

Scotland	21–8	Italy
Try: De Luca 46' m Walker 54' c Con: Paterson (1/2); Pen: Paterson (3/4) 3', 18', 67'	Report	Try: Masi 10' m Pen: Bergamasco (1/1) 30'

Murrayfield Stadium, Edinburgh
Attendance: 42,464
Referee: Steve Walsh (Australia)

FB	15	Chris Paterson
RW	14	Nikki Walker
OC	13	Joe Ansbro	(substituted off) 19'
IC	12	Sean Lamont	(substituted off) 78'
LW	11	Simon Danielli
FH	10	Ruaridh Jackson
SH	9	Rory Lawson	(substituted off) 64'
N8	8	Kelly Brown	(substituted off) 74'
OF	7	John Barclay
BF	6	Nathan Hines	(substituted off) 54'
RL	5	Alastair Kellock (c)
LL	4	Richie Gray
TP	3	Geoff Cross	(substituted off) 64'
HK	2	Ross Ford	(substituted off) 64'
LP	1	Allan Jacobsen
Replacements:
HK	16	Scott Lawson	(substituted in) 64'
PR	17	Euan Murray	(substituted in) 64'
N8	18	Richie Vernon	(substituted in) 74'
FL	19	Alasdair Strokosch	(substituted in) 64'
SH	20	Mike Blair	(substituted in) 64'
FH	21	Dan Parks	(substituted in) 78'
CE	22	Nick De Luca	(substituted in) 19'
Coach:
(England) Andy Robinson

FB	15	Andrea Masi	(substituted off) 32'
RW	14	Tommaso Benvenuti
OC	13	Gonzalo Canale
IC	12	Alberto Sgarbi	(substituted off) 69'
LW	11	Mirco Bergamasco
FH	10	Kris Burton	(substituted off) 59'
SH	9	Fabio Semenzato
N8	8	Sergio Parisse (c)
OF	7	Paul Derbyshire	(substituted off) 59'
BF	6	Alessandro Zanni
RL	5	Quintin Geldenhuys
LL	4	Carlo Del Fava	(substituted off) 54'
TP	3	Martin Castrogiovanni
HK	2	Leonardo Ghiraldini	(substituted off) 79'
LP	1	Salvatore Perugini	(substituted off) 59'
Replacements:
HK	16	Carlo Festuccia	(substituted in) 79'
PR	17	Andrea Lo Cicero	(substituted in) 59'
LK	18	Valerio Bernabò	(substituted in) 54'
FL	19	Robert Barbieri	(substituted in) 59'
SH	20	Pablo Canavosio	(substituted in) 69'
FH	21	Luciano Orquera	(substituted in) 59'
FB	22	Luke McLean	(substituted in) 32'
Coach:
(South Africa) Nick Mallett

Man of the Match:
Richie Gray (Scotland)

Touch judges:
Alan Lewis (Ireland)
John Lacey (Ireland)
Television match official:
Hugh Watkins (Wales)

- Scotland's victory lifted them from the bottom of the table and condemned Italy to a fourth consecutive wooden spoon.
- De Luca's try was the first for Scotland at Murrayfield for nearly two years.

19 March 2011
17:00

Ireland	24–8	England
Try: Bowe 27' m O’Driscoll 46' c Con: Sexton (1/2); Pen: Sexton (4/4) 6' 14' 22' 37'	Report	Try: Thompson 52' m Pen: Flood (1/2) 32'

Aviva Stadium, Dublin
Attendance: 51,000
Referee: Bryce Lawrence (New Zealand)

FB	15	Keith Earls
RW	14	Tommy Bowe
OC	13	Brian O'Driscoll (c)
IC	12	Gordon D'Arcy
LW	11	Andrew Trimble
FH	10	Johnny Sexton	(substituted off) 69'
SH	9	Eoin Reddan	(substituted off) 78'
N8	8	Jamie Heaslip
OF	7	David Wallace	(substituted off) 71'
BF	6	Seán O'Brien
RL	5	Paul O'Connell	(substituted off) 78'
LL	4	Donncha O'Callaghan
TP	3	Mike Ross	(substituted off) 58'
HK	2	Rory Best	(substituted off) 78'
LP	1	Cian Healy
Replacements:
HK	16	Seán Cronin	(substituted in) 78'
PR	17	Tom Court	(substituted in) 58'
LK	18	Leo Cullen	(substituted in) 78'
FL	19	Denis Leamy	(substituted in) 79'
SH	20	Peter Stringer	(substituted in) 78'
FH	21	Ronan O'Gara	(substituted in) 69'
CE	22	Paddy Wallace
Coach:
(Ireland) Declan Kidney

FB	15	Ben Foden
RW	14	Chris Ashton
OC	13	Matt Banahan
IC	12	Shontayne Hape
LW	11	Mark Cueto		(substituted off) 66'
FH	10	Toby Flood		(substituted off) 51'
SH	9	Ben Youngs	(yellow card) 35'	(substituted off) 46'
N8	8	Nick Easter (c)
OF	7	James Haskell
BF	6	Tom Wood
RL	5	Tom Palmer		(substituted off) 27'
LL	4	Louis Deacon		(substituted off) 55'
TP	3	Dan Cole		(substituted off) 51'
HK	2	Dylan Hartley		(substituted off) 51'
LP	1	Alex Corbisiero
Replacements:
HK	16	Steve Thompson		(substituted in) 51'
PR	17	Paul Doran-Jones		(substituted in) 51'
LK	18	Simon Shaw		(substituted in) 27'
FL	19	Tom Croft		(substituted in) 55'
SH	20	Danny Care		(substituted in) 46'
FH	21	Jonny Wilkinson		(substituted in) 51'
WG	22	David Strettle		(substituted in) 66'
Coach:
(England) Martin Johnson

Man of the Match:
Johnny Sexton (Ireland)

Touch judges:
Nigel Owens (Wales)
Tim Hayes (Wales)
Television match official:
Giulio De Santis (Italy)

- Brian O'Driscoll's try against England took his all-time championship tally up to 25, breaking the record held by Ian Smith since 1933.
- Denis Leamy (Ireland) and Mark Cueto (England) each earned their 50th caps.

19 March 2011
19:45

France	28–9	Wales
Try: Nallet (2) 37' m, 43' c Clerc 58' c Con: Parra (2/3); Pen: Parra (3/4) 7', 25', 52'	Report	Pen: Hook (3/4) 2', 42', 48'

Stade de France, Saint-Denis
Attendance: 79,798
Referee: Craig Joubert (South Africa)

FB	15	Maxime Médard
RW	14	Vincent Clerc	(substituted off) 75'
OC	13	David Marty
IC	12	Damien Traille	(substituted off) 70'
LW	11	Alexis Palisson
FH	10	François Trinh-Duc
SH	9	Morgan Parra	(substituted off) 73'
N8	8	Imanol Harinordoquy	(substituted off) 72'
OF	7	Julien Bonnaire
BF	6	Thierry Dusautoir (c)
RL	5	Lionel Nallet
LL	4	Julien Pierre	(substituted off) 66'
TP	3	Nicolas Mas	(substituted off) 66'
HK	2	William Servat	(substituted off) 70'
LP	1	Thomas Domingo
Replacements:
HK	16	Guilhem Guirado	(substituted in) 70'
PR	17	Luc Ducalcon	(substituted in) 66'
LK	18	Pascal Papé	(substituted in) 66'
FL	19	Alexandre Lapandry	(substituted in) 72'
SH	20	Julien Tomas	(substituted in) 73'
CE	21	Fabrice Estebanez	(substituted in) 70'
WG	22	Yoann Huget	(substituted in) 75'
Coach:
(France) Marc Lièvremont

FB	15	Lee Byrne
RW	14	Leigh Halfpenny
OC	13	Jamie Roberts
IC	12	Jonathan Davies
LW	11	George North
FH	10	James Hook	(yellow card) 57'	(substituted off) 66'
SH	9	Mike Phillips		(substituted off) 67'
N8	8	Ryan Jones
OF	7	Sam Warburton		(substituted off) 15'
BF	6	Dan Lydiate
RL	5	Alun Wyn Jones
LL	4	Bradley Davies
TP	3	Adam Jones		(substituted off) 52'
HK	2	Matthew Rees (c)		(substituted off) 67'
LP	1	Paul James
Replacements:
HK	16	Richard Hibbard		(substituted in) 67'
PR	17	John Yapp		(substituted in) 52'
N8	18	Jonathan Thomas		(substituted in) 15'	(substituted off) 71'
FL	19	Rob McCusker			(substituted in) 71'
SH	20	Dwayne Peel		(substituted in) 67'
FH	21	Stephen Jones		(substituted in) 66'
WG	22	Morgan Stoddart
Coach:
(New Zealand) Warren Gatland

Man of the Match:
Lionel Nallet (France)

Touch judges:
Jonathan Kaplan (South Africa)
Simon McDowell (Ireland)
Television match official:
Graham Hughes (England)

- Wales needed to beat France by 27 points to clinch the title.
- Ryan Jones (Wales) earned his 50th cap.

== Top scorers ==
=== Try scorers ===
Tries	Name	Pld	Team
6	Chris Ashton	5	England
3	Brian O'Driscoll	5	Ireland
2	Vincent Clerc	5	France
2	Maxime Médard	4	France
2	Lionel Nallet	5	France
2	Jamie Heaslip	4	Ireland
2	Andrea Masi	5	Italy
2	Morgan Stoddart	3	Wales
2	Shane Williams	4	Wales
1	27 players		

=== Points scorers ===
Points	Name	Pld	Team
50	Toby Flood	5	England
47	Morgan Parra	5	France
40	Mirco Bergamasco	5	Italy
40	James Hook	5	Wales
31	Chris Paterson	3	Scotland
30	Chris Ashton	5	England
24	Ronan O'Gara	5	Ireland
24	Johnny Sexton	5	Ireland
22	Stephen Jones	5	Wales
21	Dimitri Yachvili	5	France

== Media coverage ==
In the United Kingdom, BBC channels televised the matches live. The matches were also televised by France 2 in France, RTÉ Two in Ireland, Sky Sport in Italy and ESPN in Australia and New Zealand.

In Wales, Welsh language channel S4C televised Wales matches live.

In the United States and the Caribbean, Premium Sports televised the matches live while BBC America also televised some matches in the United States.
