= Thom Evans =

Retired Scotland international rugby union player

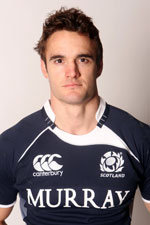
- Born: 2 April 1985 (age 41) Harare, Zimbabwe
- Height: 6 ft 2 in (1.88 m)
- Weight: 14 st 5 lb (201 lb) (91 kg)
- School: Wellington College, Berkshire
- Notable relative(s): Max Evans (brother); Chris Evans (cousin)

Rugby union career
- Position(s): Fullback, Wing
Senior career
Years	Team	Apps	(Points)
2004–2006	London Wasps	2	(0)
2006–2010	Glasgow Warriors	60	(110)
International career
Years	Team	Apps	(Points)
2008–2010	Scotland	10	(5)
- Correct as of 1 July 2010
National sevens teams
Years	Team		Comps
2007	Scotland		
2005	England		

Thom Evans (born 2 April 1985) is a Scottish former international rugby union player and model. He last played on the wing for Glasgow Warriors in the Celtic League. Evans's rugby career ended aged 24 on his tenth appearance for Scotland when he suffered a serious neck injury.

== Rugby career ==
Evans was born in 1985, the second of two sons, in Harare, Zimbabwe, and educated at Windlesham House School and Wellington College, Berkshire, England. He earned his first cap for the Scottish rugby union side in June 2008 vs Argentina. He was selected in the pre 6 Nations 30-man squad for the 2008 Six Nations.

Evans represented England at U16, U18 and U21 level. He chose to commit to Scotland at A level and at 7's. He could have played for the England 7's team but was ruled out through injury.

Evans was a member of pop band Twen2y4Se7en and toured as a support act with McFly, Peter Andre and Westlife throughout 2004.

In the Six Nations game against Wales on 13 February 2010, Evans suffered a severe neck injury after colliding with Welsh player Lee Byrne. He was stretchered off the pitch and taken to hospital to receive treatment. He underwent a neck operation that evening, and underwent a second operation to further stabilise his spine later that week. It was revealed that his cervical vertebrae had been knocked so badly out of alignment that he was a millimetre from paralysis or death. After four months of rehabilitation, Evans was forced to retire on 1 July 2010, after accepting medical advice.

Evans officially announced his retirement from all codes of rugby after the Wales v South Africa test match in the Autumn Internationals of 2010. After a touchline interview with television presenter Hazel Irvine, Evans outlined his intentions to return to the sprinting circuit, in the hope of other athletic success.

In 2012, Evans, coached by Margot Wells, kick-started his athletic campaign competing in indoor competitions and finished fourth in the Scottish Senior Championships with a personal best of 7.20 for the 60m. During the outdoor season, he ran personal bests of 11.26 for the 100m and 23.14 for the 200m respectively. However, by the end of the season, Evans decided that he would not continue with athletics, choosing instead to pursue an acting career.

== Media career ==
Evans was an analyst for ITV's coverage of the 2011 Rugby World Cup.

In September 2014, Evans was a contestant in BBC's twelfth series of Strictly Come Dancing partnered with Lithuanian professional Iveta Lukosiute. He was voted out in the 5th week.

In 2016, Evans participated in the first series of the TV show Celebrity Island with Bear Grylls, with celebrity contestants attempting to survive for 10 days on a remote island. He left the island early citing difficulties dealing with the lack of food.

In October 2019, Evans was a contestant in The X Factor: Celebrity as a member of the group, Try Star, alongside Levi Davis and Ben Foden. They were eliminated in the semi-final after landing in the bottom two with V5. However, Try Star received more votes than V5 meaning if the result went to deadlock, Try Star would have advanced to the final and V5 would have been eliminated. They finished in fifth place.

== Personal life ==
Evans's brother Max also played rugby for Scotland and Glasgow Warriors. They are the twentieth set of brothers to play together for Scotland. They are both featured in a nude photoshoot for the 2010 Dieux du Stade calendar.

In 2011, he appeared on cereal boxes for Scott's Porage Oats along with Chris Paterson and Ross Ford.

Evans is a cousin of disc jockey Chris Evans.

=== Relationships ===
In January 2020, it was reported that Evans was dating singer Nicole Scherzinger, having met on The X Factor: Celebrity the previous year. In June 2023, it was reported that Evans and Scherzinger were engaged.
