= Chris Paterson =

Scotland international rugby union player

Chris Paterson MBE
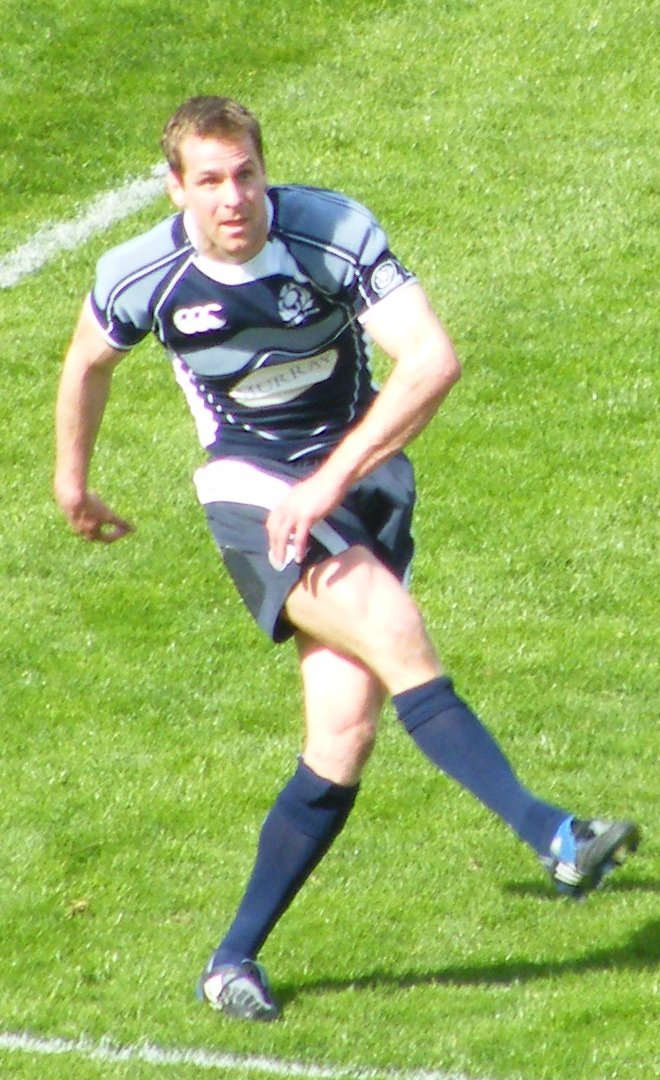
- Born: Christopher Douglas Paterson; 30 March 1978 (age 48) Edinburgh, Scotland
- Height: 5 ft 11 in (1.80 m)
- Weight: 12 st 8 lb (80 kg)
- School: Galashiels Academy
- Occupation(s): Rugby ambassador and coach

Rugby union career
- Position: Fullback / Fly-half / Wing
- Current team: Edinburgh Rugby
Amateur team(s)
Years	Team	Apps	(Points)
1996–1999	Gala RFC		
- Correct as of 24 July 2007
Senior career
Years	Team	Apps	(Points)
1998	Glasgow	2	(0)
1999–2007	Edinburgh	89	(530)
2007–2008	Gloucester	14	(38)
2008–2012	Edinburgh	67	(529)
- Correct as of 5 May 2012
International career
Years	Team	Apps	(Points)
1999–2011	Scotland	109	(809)
- Correct as of 1 October 2011

Christopher Douglas Paterson MBE (born 30 March 1978) is a Scottish former professional rugby union player. Today, he is an ambassador and specialist coach for the Scotland and Edinburgh rugby union teams; Paterson represented the latter for the vast majority of his career. He is Scotland's record points scorer with 809 points and second most-capped male player with 109 caps. He was capable of playing in a range of positions, including fullback, wing and fly-half.

Paterson retired from international rugby in December 2011 and as a professional player in May 2012.

== Early career ==
Paterson started his rugby career with hometown club Gala, the highlight being a solo try that won Gala the 1999 Scottish Cup at Murrayfield. Soon after Paterson turned professional by signing for Glasgow where he played only two games before signing for Edinburgh Rugby. In becoming a professional player he dropped out of the University of Edinburgh where he was studying to become a PE teacher.

== Edinburgh ==
From 2000 until 2002 Paterson played in the Scottish/Welsh League, the predecessor to the competition now known as Pro14 (prior to the addition of Irish teams). He was part of the Edinburgh squad that reached the Heineken Cup quarter finals in 2003–04. For seven years he was a mainstay of the Edinburgh squad. With the ongoing dispute between the SRU and then Edinburgh Rugby owner Bob Carruthers over the refusal to release Edinburgh players for a pre-2007 World Cup training camp, Paterson left Edinburgh for Gloucester by mutual consent. On 24 July 2007, Paterson signed a three-year contract with Gloucester.

== Gloucester ==
Paterson's spell with Gloucester was largely disappointing due to limited game time throughout the 2007–08 season. It was announced on 2 May 2008 that Paterson would return to Edinburgh Rugby for the 2008–09 season He played 14 games during his stay scoring 38 points, the highlight being a 50-metre breakaway try in the derby game against Bath

== Edinburgh ==
Paterson re-signed for Edinburgh Rugby upon leaving Gloucester and has remained a fixture in the line up ever since. One of Paterson's top skills – his goal-kicking – was typified in Edinburgh Rugby's last home game of the 2008–09 Celtic League season which saw a 43–3 home win against Newport Gwent Dragons on 9 May 2009. Paterson scored 28 points, kicking nine from nine with five penalties, four conversions and a try.

As of 4 April 2012, Paterson is the 5th highest points scorer in Pro12 history with 778 points (21T 113C 4D 145P). He played his last professional match against Benetton Treviso on 5 May 2012 at Murrayfield Stadium. Despite an unusually long absence from the score sheet partly owing to injury, Paterson scored Edinburgh Rugby's third try of the match leading to a 44–21 victory.

== International career ==
=== Early Career 1999–2003 ===
Paterson earned his first cap for Scotland against Spain in the 1999 Rugby World Cup as a fullback. This was his only appearance during the 1999 World Cup. Scotland went on to reach the quarter finals before losing 30–18 to New Zealand.

In Paterson's next appearance during the 2000 Six Nations Championship game versus France, Paterson scored his first points for Scotland converting two penalties and a conversion in the 16–28 loss. Later that year Paterson scored his first Scotland try during the 2000 tour of New Zealand during the 48–14 loss at Eden Park, Auckland.

During the subsequent years Paterson became a fixture in the Scotland team. His consistent performance for club and country earned him a place in Scotland's 2003 Rugby World Cup squad.

During Scotland's opening 2003 Rugby World Cup game Paterson scored two tries and kicked a conversion and a penalty during a 32–11 win against Japan. In the next game against the United States Paterson scored 19 points, including a try, during a 39–15 win. Paterson played in the subsequent win and loss against Fiji and France to help Scotland qualify for the quarter final stage. In the 2003 Rugby World cup quarter-finals, Scotland lost 33–16 to Australia at Lang Park, Brisbane.

Paterson scored 71 points during the 2003 Rugby World Cup and was named the team's player of the tournament.

=== 2003–2007 ===
On 15 November 2004 during Scotland's record 100–8 win over Japan game at McDiarmid Park, Perth he overtook Andy Irvine to become Scotland's second highest points scorer, behind Gavin Hastings. He scored 40 points (three tries, 11 conversions and one penalty). This remains a record points haul for a Scottish player in a test match.

Two weeks later on 27 November 2004 against South Africa he became the youngest, and lightest, Scottish player ever to earn 50 caps, aged 26, and weighing in at 78 kg.

On 26 February 2005, Paterson equalled the scoring record set by Gavin Hastings for one game of six penalties converted in the 18–13 win over Italy. Paterson was the BBC's full-back of the 2005 Six Nations Championship.

As a result of his incredibly reliable kicking and elusive running from full-back during the 2005 Six Nations Championship, especially in the Calcutta Cup game, Paterson's omission from Clive Woodward's squad for the 2005 British & Irish Lions tour to New Zealand surprised many critics and fans alike. This fueled criticism that Woodward relied too much upon his England team who had won the 2003 Rugby World Cup. Ultimately, Woodward's 2005 Lions were unsuccessful losing the test series 3–0.

Paterson played as part of a resurgent Scotland team of the 2006 Six Nations Championship who recorded wins over France, England and Italy to finish third in the table. This remains Scotland's best finish since the 5 Nations became the 6 Nations with the addition of Italy in 2000.

Paterson was captain during the 2007 Six Nations Championship as Jason White was injured.

Paterson was picked in Scotland's 2007 Rugby World Cup squad. This his third World Cup campaign. Similarly, with the previous two in 1999 & 2003 Scotland exited in the quarter final stage losing 19–13 to Argentina at the Stade de France, Saint-Denis. Paterson played in all five of Scotland's games scoring 46 points. He deployed a flawless kicking performance on the final stage group game, a decider against Italy (against whom they had suffered a home defeat at the previous Six Nations): Paterson secured qualification by scoring all points of Scotland's narrow 18–16 victory, with an impeccable 6 out of 6 kicking performance.

=== Later career 2008–2011 ===
On 9 February 2008, Paterson earned his 83rd cap for Scotland against Wales, passing the record of Gregor Townsend for a Scottish back. Scotland then went on to lose this match.

Later that year on 14 June 2008 he won his 88th cap to break Scott Murray's Scotland appearance record and was named man of the match in Scotland's 26–14 victory over Argentina in Buenos Aires. During the 2009 Autumn International against Australia, Paterson scored winning points in Scotland's historic 9–8 win. This was Scotland's first win over Australia for 27 years.

On 7 February 2010, Paterson won his 99th cap in Scotland's opening 2010 Six Nations Championship match against France.

On Saturday 13 February 2010 at the Millennium Stadium in Cardiff, Paterson became the first player to reach 100 caps for Scotland when he played in the defeat against Wales. In the same game Paterson was seriously injured, suffering a split kidney which forced him to miss the rest of the season. In the same game Rory Lamont suffered cruciate ligament damage which ended his season, and Thom Evans suffered a potentially life-threatening neck injury in a collision with Lee Byrne. This injury forced Evans to retire from rugby aged just 25.

Later that year on Saturday 20 November 2010 Paterson gained his 101st cap in a 21–17 win against current world champions, South Africa, at Murrayfield coming on for the final 8 minutes. Along with Nikki Walker and Nathan Hines, he was one of three players in that match who had also been in the Scotland team that beat South Africa in 2002.

During the 2011 Six Nations Championship Paterson was the 23rd man in the squad when he travelled to Paris but played no part. Following Scotland's poor defeat to Wales in the second game of the tournament, Paterson was recalled to the starting 15 for the Ireland, England and Italy games. In addition to scoring 31 points with the boot in these three matches he justified his inclusion with an impressive try-saving tackle on Ben Foden, when the England Fullback seemed certain to score. This helped to keep Scotland in with a chance of winning the game until the last few minutes, although they eventually lost 22–16. The following week he made an almost identical try-saving tackle against Luke McLean during Scotland's 21–8 victory over Italy. In the latter match, Paterson also became only the fifth player to score more than 400 points in the history of the Five/Six Nations Tournament.

Testament to Paterson's committed performances during the 2011 Six Nations Championship he featured in several rugby journalists 'Team of the Championship'

On 22 August 2011 Paterson was selected in Scotland's 2011 Rugby World Cup squad meaning this would be in fourth Rugby World Cup.

Paterson scored 14 points in Scotland's opening game of the 2011 Rugby World Cup in the 34–24 victory over Romania

In Scotland's second pool game of the 2011 Rugby World Cup during the 15–6 victory over Georgia Paterson made a substitute appearance in the 70th minute his 13th World Cup appearance one short of Doddie Weir's record of 14 World Cup appearances.

In Scotland's third pool game in the 13–12 defeat against Argentina Paterson equalled Doddie Weir's record of 14 appearances scoring a penalty.

In what transpired to be Chris Paterson's 109th and final appearance in the ultimate game of Pool B against England in Auckland, Scotland required victory to progress to the quarter-final stage. The game finished 16–12 in England's favour with Chris Ashton scoring a last minute try to knock Scotland out at the pool stage for the first time. In this game he set a record for the most Scotland World Cup appearances with 15 and furthered his own Scotland point's scoring record to 809.

Paterson announced his retirement from international rugby in December 2011; at the time, he held many of the most significant Scottish career records. His 109 caps was more than 20 clear of then-second-placed Scott Murray; his 96 starts are also the most in Scotland history. He remained Scotland's most-capped player until Ross Ford overtook him in 2017. Paterson was also involved in more defeats (65) than any other Scotland internationalist. Despite not being a regular kicker until after he had amassed 26 caps, he retired as Scotland's all-time leader in points (809), conversions (86) and penalties (140). Perhaps the most remarkable aspect of his Scotland career was his versatility; he retired as one of Scotland's three top cap-winners at two different positions. Paterson's 49 caps on the wing were third to Kenny Logan (63) and Sean Lamont (52); his 43 caps as a fullback were also third, this time to Gavin Hastings (61) and Andy Irvine (47). In addition, he has the most caps of any player from the Home Unions (England, Ireland, Scotland, Wales) who did not appear in a Test with the British & Irish Lions.

=== Coaching and rugby ambassador 2012 onwards ===
In May 2012 it was announced that Paterson would take on the dual role of specialist coach and ambassador with the Scottish Rugby Union.

== Kicking Accuracy ==
During his time as Scotland's and Edinburgh Rugby's goal kicker Paterson amassed 1860 points.

Paterson successfully kicked 36 consecutive goals for Scotland between 11 August 2007 and 7 June 2008, not missing a single attempt during the 2007 Rugby World Cup or the 2008 Six Nations Championship. This run was brought to an end during 7 June 2008 Test against Argentina. This is believed to have been a world record for consecutive successful kicks at goal in Test play since such statistics were first kept in the late 1980s; this record was broken in 2010 by Morné Steyn of South Africa. During the aforementioned Argentina match, Paterson also overtook Gavin Hastings' long standing Scotland points record of 667, as well as equalling Scott Murray's record of 87 caps for Scotland.

During his playing career he scored 809 points for Scotland (22 Tries, 90 Conversions, 170 Penalties and 3 drop goals).

For Edinburgh Rugby Paterson has amassed 773 points (20T 113C 4D 145P) in the Pro12 and 287 points (9T,40C,0D,54P)in the Heineken Cup He retired from international duty on 21 December 2011, and from Edinburgh Rugby May 2012.

== Other ==
Paterson's high profile in Scotland has been used in marketing campaigns for several companies. In 2011 he appeared on cereal boxes for Scott's Porage Oats along with Ross Ford and Thom Evans. MacSween Haggis used him to front a new product range

Paterson was appointed Member of the Order of the British Empire (MBE) in the 2012 New Year Honours for services to Scottish rugby. In June 2012 he received an honorary Doctor of Science (DSc) degree from Edinburgh Napier University.

=== International tries ===
As of 22 March 2022.

Try	Opposing Team	Venue	Competition	Date	Result	Score
1	New Zealand	Eden Park, Auckland	2000 Scotland rugby union tour of New Zealand	1 July 2000	Loss	48-14
2	United States	Murrayfield Stadium, Edinburgh	2000 Autumn Internationals	4 November 2000	Win	53-6
3	Wales	Murrayfield Stadium, Edinburgh	2001 Six Nations	17 February 2001	Draw	28-28
4	Canada	Thunderbird Stadium, Vancouver	2002 Scotland rugby union tour of North America	15 June 2002	Loss	26-23
5	United States	Boxer Stadium, San Francisco	2002 Scotland rugby union tour of North America	22 June 2002	Win	23-65
6	United States	Boxer Stadium, San Francisco	2002 Scotland rugby union tour of North America	22 June 2002	Win	23-65
7	Romania	Murrayfield Stadium, Edinburgh	2002 Autumn Internationals	9 November 2002	Win	37-14
8	Wales	Murrayfield Stadium, Edinburgh	2003 Six Nations	8 March 2003	Win	30-22
9	Italy	Murrayfield Stadium, Edinburgh	2003 Six Nations	29 March 2003	Win	33-25
10	South Africa	Kings Park Stadium, Durban	2003 Scotland rugby union tour of South Africa	7 June 2003	Loss	29-25
11	Japan	Willow Sports Complex, Townsville	2003 Rugby World Cup	12 October 2003	Win	32-11
12	Japan	Willow Sports Complex, Townsville	2003 Rugby World Cup	12 October 2003	Win	32-11
13	United States	Suncorp Stadium, Brisbane	2003 Rugby World Cup	20 October 2003	Win	39-15
14	Japan	McDiarmid Park, Perth	2004 Autumn Internationals	13 November 2004	Win	100-8
15	Japan	McDiarmid Park, Perth	2004 Autumn Internationals	13 November 2004	Win	100-8
16	Japan	McDiarmid Park, Perth	2004 Autumn Internationals	13 November 2004	Win	100-8
17	Wales	Murrayfield Stadium, Edinburgh	2005 Six Nations	13 March 2005	Loss	22-46
18	Romania	Dinamo Stadium, Bucharest	2005 mid-year rugby union tests	5 June 2005	Win	19-39
19	Wales	Millennium Stadium, Cardiff	2006 Six Nations	12 February 2006	Loss	28-18
20	Italy	Stadio Flaminio, Rome	2006 Six Nations	18 March 2006	Win	10-13
21	Italy	Murrayfield Stadium, Edinburgh	2007 Six Nations	24 February 2007	Loss	17-37
22	Romania	Murrayfield Stadium, Edinburgh	2007 Rugby World Cup	18 September 2007	Win	42-0

== See also ==
- Duncan Paterson, his uncle and former Scottish international
- Gregor Townsend, another former pupil of Galashiels Academy
- List of rugby union Test caps leaders
