= Fabio Semenzato =

Italy international rugby union player

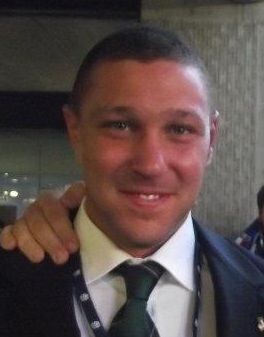
- Born: Fabio Semenzato; 6 May 1986 (age 40) Treviso, Italy
- Height: 5 ft 9 in (1.75 m)
- Weight: 14 st 2 lb (198 lb; 90 kg)

Rugby union career
- Position: Scrum half
- Current team: Rugby Paese
Youth career
- Rugby Paese
Senior career
Years	Team	Apps	(Points)
2005−2014	Treviso	154	(50)
2014−2016	Mogliano	36	(20)
2015−2016	→Zebre	4	(0)
2016−2021	Calvisano	89	(30)
2021−2023	Mogliano	34	(15)
2023−	Paese Rugby		
International career
Years	Team	Apps	(Points)
2009-10	Italy A	6	(0)
2011-12	Italy	12	(5)
- Correct as of 17 November 2011
Coaching career
- Years: Team
- 2022−2024: Mogliano (Assistant Coach)

Fabio Semenzato (born 6 May 1986) is an Italian rugby union player. His regular playing position is as a scrum-half. He plays currently for Rugby Paese. He played for Mogliano from 2021 to 2023. From 2022 to 2024 season he became also its Assistant Coach.

Semenzato played for Benetton Treviso from 2005 to 2014 and in 2015 he was named as Additional Player for Zebre.

Semenzato already played for Italy A and was selected for the Italian national team at the 2010 Six Nations Championship. In the 2011 Six Nations Championship he was the first choice scrum-half for Italy. He was voted second best player of the tournament, after fellow Italian Andrea Masi.
