= Nick De Luca =

Scotland international rugby union player

- Born: Nicholas John De Luca; 1 February 1984 (age 42) Dumfries, Scotland
- Height: 183 cm (6 ft 0 in)
- Weight: 93 kg (14 st 9 lb; 205 lb)
- School: Lockerbie Academy
- University: University of Edinburgh

Rugby union career
- Position: Centre
Senior career
Years	Team	Apps	(Points)
2005–2006	Edinburgh	5	(0)
2006–2007	Border Reivers	23	(15)
2007–2014	Edinburgh	123	(75)
2014–2016	Biarritz	44	(15)
2016–	Wasps	1	(0)
- Correct as of 19 June 2015
International career
Years	Team	Apps	(Points)
2008–14	Scotland	43	(5)
- Correct as of 29 June 2014

Nick De Luca (born 1 February 1984) is a Scottish former professional rugby union player who played as a centre.

== Early years ==
De Luca was born in Dumfries and grew up in Lockerbie.

== Club rugby ==
De Luca's position of choice is as a Centre. He can also operate at Full back and Wing. In his early career he caught the eye with his notable 'outside breaks', opening up defences and creating chances. His creative play has been noted for deceptive strength, slick handling and quick foot work.

At club level De Luca began as an apprentice with Edinburgh in 2005 before joining Border Reivers for the 2006–07 season. Following the region's dissolution in 2007 he returned to Edinburgh. De Luca's debut season was marked by memorable try against Toulouse in the Heineken Cup where he stood up the famed Yannick Jauzion to touch down, and he also contributed a spellbinding effort during the dramatic win at Ospreys later on that year. He was named in the Pro12 Dream team at the end of the 2007–08 season.

== International ==
De Luca was a member of the Scotland A squads for the 2006 and 2007 Churchill Cup tournaments in Canada and England respectively. A former Scotland Sevens internationalist, De Luca is the joint all-time leading try scorer for the Scotland under-21 team. He shares this honour with Ben Cairns.

Having already represented Scotland at all age-grade levels as well as 'A' level, De Luca was called up to the Scotland squad for the 2008 Six Nations Championship. He made his debut for Scotland against France in the first game of the 2008 Six Nations Championship. De Luca held on to his position for the following game against Wales. He had a difficult introduction to international rugby as he struggled throughout the 2008 RBS 6 Nations as part of an under-used and ineffective Scottish backline from which he has done well to recover.

De Luca was part of the Scotland team that recorded a historic series victory in Argentina in June 2010, starting at outside centre in the first test victory in Tucuman.

His first international try was on 19 March 2011 in the 2011 Six Nations Championship match against Italy at Murrayfield, the first Scotland try at the stadium since November 2009.

De Luca started for Scotland in the 2011 Rugby World Cup games against Georgia and Argentina. He displaced Joe Ansbro who had started in the first game for Scotland against Romania. In the next game, a decider against England, De Luca joined the game as a second-half substitute for the injured Max Evans.

== Personal life ==
De Luca is married to Alissa, and together they have three daughters.

Dumfries-born De Luca applauded the heroics of his local football team Queen of the South in reaching the 2008 Scottish Cup Final against the odds after recording a shock 4–3 semi-final win over Aberdeen. De Luca said: "Although I'm not a big football fan, it was really pleasing to see Queen of the South reach the Scottish Cup Final: that type of result is what sport is all about."
