= Danny Care =

England international rugby union player

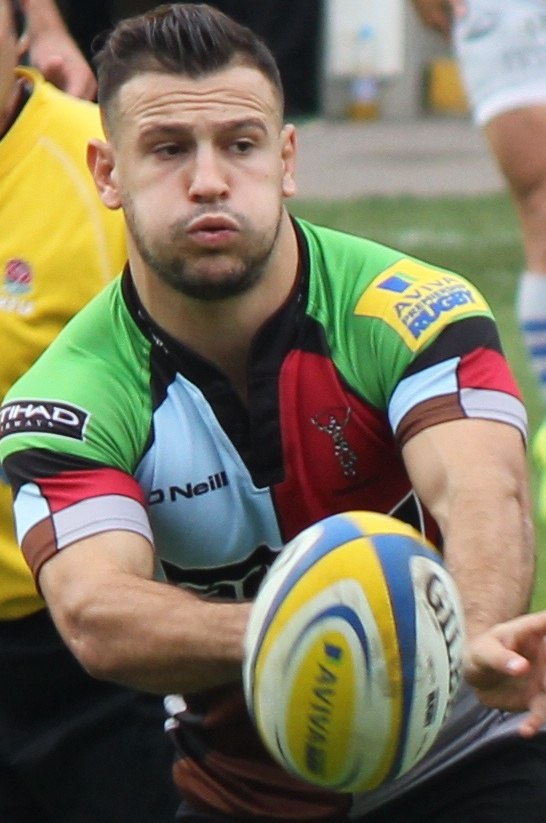
- Care representing Harlequins during the Aviva Premiership
- Full name: Daniel Stuart Care
- Born: 2 January 1987 (age 39) Leeds, England
- Height: 1.75 m (5 ft 9 in)
- Weight: 85 kg (187 lb; 13 st 5 lb)
- School: Prince Henry's Grammar School

Rugby union career
- Position(s): Scrum-half, Fly-half
- Current team: Harlequins
Senior career
Years	Team	Apps	(Points)
2004–2006	Leeds Tykes	13	(26)
2006–2025	Harlequins	395	(594)
- Correct as of 25 August 2025
International career
Years	Team	Apps	(Points)
2006	England U19	6	(20)
2006-2007	England U21	9	(13)
2008–2022	England XV	7	(15)
2008–2024	England	101	(84)
- Correct as of 16 March 2024
National sevens team
Years	Team		Comps
2006–2008	England		7
- Correct as of 8 May 2024
Medal record
Men's rugby sevens
Representing England
Commonwealth Youth Games
Silver medal – second place	2004 Bendigo	Team competition
Commonwealth Games
Silver medal – second place	2006 Melbourne	Team competition

Daniel Stuart Care (born 2 January 1987) is a former English professional rugby union player who played as a scrum-half for Premiership Rugby club Harlequins and the England national team.

== Early life ==
Care was born in Leeds, West Yorkshire. He first played rugby union at age 6, with his local club in Leeds, West Park Bramhope RUFC (now called West Park Leeds RUFC). At age 11 he was invited to join the Academy at Sheffield Wednesday Football Club which meant giving up club rugby union although he continued playing the game at Prince Henry's Grammar School, Otley.

He helped Prince Henry's win the Under-13 Yorkshire Cup in 2000 but he missed almost all of the next season recovering from a broken leg sustained in a school game.

The following season he was released from Sheffield Wednesday academy, and could concentrate on rugby union. By the end of the season he had been selected for Yorkshire Schools' Under-15's. The next season he was also selected for Yorkshire and the North of England before making his debut for England Schools' Under-16s against Wales at Neath in April 2003. Care had resumed club rugby union with Otley and the season also brought another Yorkshire Cup success at Under-16's with Prince Henry's.

Care joined the Leeds Tykes academy at the start of the 2003–04 season. Leeds won the National Under-19 Colts Cup that season and Care was named as Tykes' Players' Young Player of the Year. At school level Care spent the season playing at fly-half and helped Prince Henry's to win the Daily Mail Under-18 Vase at Twickenham, he scored 13 points in an 18–11 win against St Columba's College, St Albans. He was selected for the England Clubs Under-18's squad for the Four Nations Tournament held in Belfast where he played against Ireland, Scotland, and Wales.

Care played 20 times for the England youth setup scoring 25 points between 2003 and 2007. He also played for England sevens in the 2004 youth commonwealth games in Bendigo Australia.

== Club career ==
=== Leeds Tykes ===
In 2003, Care made his first XV for Leeds Tykes on the wing as a second-half replacement in a pre-season friendly against Exeter Chiefs. He was selected for Team England in the rugby sevens at the 2004 Commonwealth Youth Games in Bendigo, Australia, his first experience of sevens. England won the silver medal, losing 26–24 to the hosts, Australia, in the Final. Care was top try scorer in the competition with 7 tries.

He was an unused replacement for Leeds in home and away European Challenge Cup games against Grenoble, Care made his competitive debut at fly-half away to Valladolid RAC, in Spain, in the European Challenge Shield a week after returning from Australia. His involvement lasted 23 minutes before he suffered a broken leg, by which time he had scored a try and kicked 4 conversions.

Care signed his first professional contract with Leeds in December 2004.

After completing his A-level studies at Prince Henry's, Care joined Leeds on a full-time basis alongside All Black scrum-half legend Justin Marshall who signed for the club during the close season. A pre-season injury to Leeds' No.2 scrum-half Mark McMillan gave Care an early opportunity to understudy Marshall and he made his Guinness Premiership debut away at Saracens in September 2005 as a replacement for Marshall late in the game. Over the coming weeks further opportunities arose for first team experience including starting appearances in the Powergen Cup against Sale (which brought his first senior try) and against Newcastle (which brought his first man-of-the-match award).

=== Harlequins ===
==== 2006–2008 ====
In the summer of 2006, Care signed a 3-year contract with Harlequins. At Harlequins Care initially found himself understudying Samoan international Steve So'oialo at scrum-half but after disappointing results early in the season the club recruited the experienced Andy Gomarsall, a member of England's World Cup winning squad in 2003. This restricted his game time, he started in the EDF Energy Cup and European Challenge Cup games before making his first Guinness Premiership start for Harlequins in a 9–3 home win against Bath in January 2007.

The start of the 2007–08 season presented Care with a chance of an extended run as starting scrum-half at Harlequins as Andy Gomarsall and Steve So'oialo were away at the Rugby World Cup in France with England and Samoa respectively. He was selected for the London Double Header, the first fixture of the season, against London Irish at Twickenham. Care was prominent as Harlequins beat London Irish 35–27, he was injured in the match and sidelined for 5 weeks. By the time he had recovered, Gomarsall and So'oialo had returned to club action and game time was limited in the Premiership. He started several games in the Heineken Cup and EDF Energy Cup. At the end of the domestic season, Care was shortlisted for the Guinness Premiership Young Player of the Year Award – he finished 3rd behind Ben Foden and the winner, Danny Cipriani.

==== 2008–2010 ====
Care had a successful season at club level in 2008–09 with Harlequins who finished 2nd in the Guinness Premiership and reached the quarter-finals of the Heineken Cup, at that point the club's best season in the professional era. At the end of the domestic season Care was shortlisted for the PRA Young Player of the Year Award which was voted for by his fellow professionals – he finished 3rd in the voting behind Tom Croft and the winner, Ben Foden.

Care agreed a 2-year contract extension with Harlequins, committing himself to the club until June 2011. In August 2010 Care agreed a 2-year contract extension with Harlequins, committing himself to the club until June 2013.

==== 2010–2012 ====
Care had a successful season at club level with Harlequins as the club won the Amlin Challenge Cup, the 2nd tier European club rugby competition. Quins came top of their Pool which consisted of Bayonne, Connacht and I Cavalieri Prato, and beat Wasps at home in the quarter-final and Munster away in the semi-final, with Care scoring in both games. The final was at the Cardiff City Stadium against Stade Français Paris. With Harlequins losing 18–12 with only 5 minutes to play Care produced a line break and chip kick to enable Gonzalo Camacho to score a try which was converted to give Harlequins a win, 19–18. The win enabled Harlequins to qualify for the Heineken Cup, for the 2011–12 season as the club had failed to qualify via the Aviva Premiership. Care scored 7 tries in all competitions during the season and was named in the ESPN Dream Team for 2010–11.

Care was arrested on 10 December 2011 on suspicion of being drunk and disorderly. He was not charged but was subsequently fined by Harlequins. He was also arrested and charged with drink driving on 1 January 2012. He was again disciplined by Harlequins and was told that he would not be considered for selection for the England Six Nations squad. On 16 January 2012 Care attended Southampton Magistrates' Court where he pleaded guilty to a charge of drink driving, was banned from driving for 16 months and fined £3,100. Care was arrested outside the Queens Hotel in the early hours of 4 March 2012 in Leeds. He was taken to a station by officers and questioned about the offence before being released. Care was given a caution for being drunk and disorderly.

On 23 March 2012, Care was accused of sexual assault earlier in the month. He was bailed pending further enquiries. On 9 July 2012 Care was advised that the police investigation had been completed. The Crown Prosecution Service had decided that there was no case to answer.

Despite his off-field issues Care helped Harlequins to their best ever season as they became English champions for the first time in the club's history. Harlequins finished top of the Aviva Premiership at the end of the regular season and qualified for a home semi-final in the play-offs against Northampton Saints. Care missed the semi-final due to a shoulder injury but Harlequins beat Northampton 25–23 to quality for the final against Leicester Tigers. Care had recovered from injury in time to play in the play-off final at Twickenham as Harlequins beat Leicester, 30–23. Stephen Jones of the Sunday Times said "Danny Care at scrum-half had what may well have been the game of his career. He was marvellously sharp and his decision-making was immaculate". Care made 16 appearances during the Premiership season and contributed 4 tries and 1 drop goal.

In August 2012, Care agreed a 3-year contract extension with Harlequins, committing himself to the club until June 2016.

==== 2012–2025 ====
At club level, Care helped Harlequins to finish 3rd in the Aviva Premiership and qualify for the end of season play-offs. In the semi-final they lost 33–16 away to Leicester to end the defence of their title. In the penultimate game of the regular season Care made his 100th Premiership appearances, he scored 2 tries as Harlequins won 42–26 against Worcester Warriors. Harlequins won all of their group games in the Heineken Cup, making them top seeds from the pool stages, but lost a home quarter-final against Munster 18–12. Care was one of six players shortlisted for the Aviva Premiership Rugby Player of the Year Award; the winner was Tom Youngs (Leicester Tigers). He was also shortlisted for the Rugby Players' Association (RPA) Player of the Year Award, the winner was Christian Wade (London Wasps).

Care won his second Premiership title and started as Harlequins won the game 40–38 in the highest scoring Premiership final ever on 26 June 2021.

In April 2024, Care was part of the Harlequins side that beat Glasgow Warriors in Champions Cup, defeating them 28–24 at home to win the club's first ever knockout game in the competition. He then played in their semi final defeat in Toulose. Despite reported interest from France, including Top 14 sides, Perpignan and Bayonne, he signed a new one-year deal to stay with Harlequins ahead of the 2024–25 season.

In May 2025, after completing his 19th season at Harlequins he announced his retirement from professional rugby. He made his final appearance wearing the number nine shirt, despite appearing off the bench, with first choice scrum half Will Porter wearing the 21 jersey, in a 24–22 victory against Exeter Chiefs.

== International career ==
=== England Sevens ===
Early in the 2005–06 season, he was named in the core squad for the senior England Sevens team and in February 2006, he made his debut at Wellington in the New Zealand leg of the IRB Sevens series. England lost to France in the quarter-final of the Cup but bounced back to beat Argentina in the final of the Plate. The squad moved straight on to Los Angeles where they beat Fiji in the final of the Cup to record England's first ever win in the USA leg of the IRB Sevens.

Care's performances in Wellington and Los Angeles earned him selection for Team England at the Commonwealth Games in Melbourne where he won a silver medal after defeat by New Zealand in the final of the competition, this was England's first ever medal in the Games at Rugby Sevens. This gave Care a unique double as the only England rugby player to win medals at the Commonwealth Youth Games and the senior Commonwealth Games.

In between Los Angeles and Melbourne, Care made his debut for the England Under-19 team. He scored 2 tries in a 35–5 victory over Scotland at the Twickenham Stoop. Later in the season he travelled to Dubai where he was a member of the England squad which achieved 3rd place in the IRB Under-19 World Championship, England's highest ever position in the tournament. Care started the tournament in his customary position at scrum-half but he was selected to start at fly-half in the crucial 3rd/4th place game against France as first choice fly-half Danny Cipriani had suffered concussion in an earlier game against South Africa. Care scored a try late in the game which was converted to bring the game level at 12–12. England clinched 3rd place by virtue of out-scoring France 2 tries to nil.

=== England ===
==== 2006–2008 ====
He was selected for the 2006 IRB Under-21 World Championship in France, making his debut at that level in the opening game against Fiji which England won 34–8. He won 4 caps during the tournament including a starting appearance in the 5th/6th place game against Ireland. Care scored the first try in England's 32–8 victory which gave them 5th place, their highest ever finishing position in the competition. He was named as captain of the England Under-21 team for the 2007 Six Nations games, his first experience of captaincy at any level of the game. Care's debut as captain saw England gain a comfortable 31–5 victory over Scotland at Bath. A week later Care lead his side to a 30–10 victory over Italy, again at Bath, with Care contributing a drop goal in the second half. England's lost 13–6 against Ireland in Athlone, and finished the championship in 3rd place after losing 32–13 to France at Northampton and drawing 21–21 against Wales at Newport.

Care was recalled to the England Sevens squad for the Hong Kong and Adelaide legs of the IRB Sevens Tournament during late March & early April 2007. England were knocked out at the quarter-final stage in both tournaments. In Hong Kong they lost to New Zealand and in Adelaide they were beaten by Kenya. He was selected for England Sevens squad for the final legs of the 2006/2007 IRB Sevens series at Twickenham and Murrayfield. At Twickenham England failed to qualify for the quarter-finals of the Cup after a 22–0 defeat to Wales on Day 1. Care scored a hat-trick of tries in a 17–14 victory over South Africa. On Day 2 England beat Kenya, France and Portugal to win the Bowl competition.

A week later at Murrayfield England again disappointed on Day 1 by failing to qualify for the quarter-finals of the Cup after defeats against Argentina and New Zealand. On Day 2 they won the Bowl beating Portugal 31–0 in the final. Due to the late withdrawal from the squad of England Sevens captain Simon Amor, Care was asked to take on additional responsibility by assuming the main play-maker role within the team. He was the 2nd highest scorer in the tournament with 42 points (4 tries + 11 conversions) including 2 tries in a thrilling 24–19 victory over Australia in the Bowl semi-final which went into extra-time.

Care was selected for an England Saxons training squad in January 2008, followed a few days later by selection for the England Sevens squad to play in Wellington in the New Zealand leg of the IRB Sevens. In Wellington England again disappointed on Day 1 losing all 3 games, including a defeat against the Cook Islands. On Day 2 they won the Bowl, beating Argentina 12–7 in the Final. On his return from Wellington he was called into the England Saxons training squad and selected as a replacement for the game against Italy A in Ragusa, Sicily in February 2008. Care made his Saxons debut in the 2nd half helping the team to a 38–15 victory.

Care's performances during the early part of 2008 earned him a call-up to the England training squad before the Six Nations games against Scotland and Ireland. He was named as the Guinness Premiership Player of the Month for March 2008, and in May he was selected for the England squad for the end of season game against the Barbarians and the summer tour to New Zealand.

Care was selected for an uncapped England XV against the Barbarians at Twickenham which England won 17–14. He made his England debut as a 2nd half replacement in the First Test against New Zealand at Eden Park, Auckland which New Zealand won 37–20. A week later came his first start for England in the Second Test at Christchurch which New Zealand won 44–12 with Care scoring his first try for England in the 2nd half.

==== 2008–2010 ====
In July 2008, Care was selected in the England Elite Player Squad for the forthcoming season. His early season performances for Harlequins earned him selection for his third England cap as starting scrum-half for the opening Autumn International against the Pacific Islands at Twickenham. Care played a prominent role in England's 39–13 victory, and his performance was sufficient to earn him selection in the starting line-up for the 3 remaining Autumn International against Australia, South Africa and New Zealand, England lost all 3 games.

Care was selected to start in the opening game of the 2009 RBS 6 Nations competition against Italy but a slip on ice after a training session at the team hotel in Surrey caused him to withdraw with damaged ankle ligaments and his place in the team was taken by Harry Ellis. The injury meant that Care also missed the next game against Wales but he recovered sufficiently to take a place on the bench against Ireland at Croke Park, Dublin, where England lost, 14–13. Care was heavily criticised in the national press for his performance in Dublin. Care retained his place on the bench for the final RBS 6 Nations games at home to France and Scotland. Against Scotland, he was on the field as early as the 16th minute following an injury to Ellis. Care contributed a drop goal as England beat Scotland 26–12 to regain the Calcutta Cup.

Care was considered by many to be unlucky not to be selected for the British and Irish Lions squad for the summer tour to South Africa but he retained his place in the England squad for the end of season game against the Barbarians and the 2 match series against Argentina. Care started all 3 games which began with a 33–26 defeat in the "non-cap" game against an experienced Barbarians team at Twickenham. A week later, England beat Argentina 37–15 at Old Trafford, Manchester but lost the return fixture 24–22 the following week in Salta.

Care retained his position as starting scrum-half for the first of the Autumn Internationals in 2009 against Australia, England lost the game 18–9. There was widespread criticism of the overall team performance and the following week against Argentina Care moved to the replacements' bench. England beat Argentina 16–9 and Care remained on the bench for the final game against New Zealand which England lost 19–6. Care made brief appearances late in the game against both Argentina and New Zealand.

Care regained the starting spot for the 2010 RBS 6 Nations, starting all 5 games in the championship. He played a prominent part in England's 30–17 victory against Wales in the opening game at Twickenham, scoring a try early in the second half but a mixed campaign saw England finish in 3rd place. At club level, Care had a disappointing season with Harlequins who finished in 8th place in the Guinness Premiership, missing out on qualification for the Heineken Cup.

At the end of the season, Care was part of the England squad which travelled to Australia and New Zealand for a 5-game tour including 2 Tests against Australia but before the tour party left England played against the Barbarians at Twickenham in a "non-cap" game. Care started the game which England won 35–26.

In Australia, Care started the 1st Test against Australia in Perth which Australia won 27–17. England's poor performance in the game attracted significant criticism and Care was replaced by Ben Youngs for the 2nd Test one week later in Sydney. England won the 2nd Test 21–20 to tie the Test series 1 game all with Care coming off the bench after 66 minutes.

After the Australian leg of the tour, England moved on to New Zealand to play against New Zealand Māori in Napier in a "non-cap" game as part of the centenary celebrations for Maori rugby. Care started the game and scored a try late in the 1st half, but England lost the game 35–28.

==== 2010–2012 ====
During the 2010-11 England season Care found himself on the replacements bench for all nine games. Care came off the bench in the first four games of the 2011 Six Nations, which England won. England travelled to Dublin to play Ireland in Round 5 where with a Championship and a Grand Slam could be won, Care was brought on in the 46th minute. England were beaten 24–8, but won the 2011 RBS 6 Nations Championship as nearest rivals Wales were beaten by France in Paris. In June 2011 Care was named in England's preliminary 45-man training squad prior to the Rugby World Cup.

During a Rugby World Cup warm up game Care received widespread praise, especially in Wales, for his sportsmanship during the game in refusing to play the ball at the base of a ruck when it was clear that Welsh full-back Morgan Stoddart was badly injured following a tackle. Referee Steve Walsh was forced to stop the game to allow Stoddart to be treated for what turned out to be a double fracture of tibia and fibula. The following week Care sustained a torn plantar plate affecting the big toe of his left foot, an injury which required surgery and which kept him out of England's squad for the World Cup. The medical reports confirming that surgery was required came just a few hours after Care had been informed by England Head Coach Martin Johnson that he would be included in the squad. Whilst recovering from his injury Care worked for ESPN and Sky Sports on rugby coverage as well as being an analyst for ITV's coverage of the 2011 Rugby World Cup.

Care's was recalled to the England senior squad for the summer tour to South Africa. Care was recalled to the starting XV for the third and final Test in Port Elizabeth with Lee Dickson on the bench. England drew 14–14, Care scored England's only try early in the first half and was named man of the match.

==== 2012–2024 ====
Care retained the starting shirt for England's opening game of the Autumn Internationals against Fiji. England won 54–12, despite Care being sin-binned for a tip-tackle on Leone Nakarawa. Care started the following week against Australia, and England lost 20–14. Care came off the bench for the next game against South Africa, England lost 16–15, and for the final game of the series as England beat world champions New Zealand 38–21, their first win over the All Blacks in 9 years.

Care remained on the bench in the 2013 RBS 6 Nations championship against Scotland at Twickenham, and scored England's fourth try in the final minute of the game. In Round 3, 2 weeks later, Care came off the bench in the second half as England beat France, 23–13. Care started an 18–11 win against Italy but returned to the bench for the championship decider against Wales in Cardiff. England had the opportunity to clinch the championship and a Grand Slam but Wales won comfortably 30–3, England's biggest ever defeat in the fixture.

Care was not selected for the 2013 British and Irish Lions squad to tour Australia. Greg Growden, writing for ESPN Scrum.com in Australia, said, "Danny Care's chances of making the tour were always going to be hard after spending most of the Six Nations series on the England bench, acting as Ben Youngs' back-up."

In August 2013 Care was named in the England Elite Player Squad for the forthcoming season.

Following the 2024 Six Nations, a campaign where England finished 2nd, Care announced his retirement from international rugby.

== Career statistics ==
=== List of international tries ===
No.	Date	Venue	Opponent	Score	Result	Competition
1	21 June 2008	AMI Stadium, Christchurch, New Zealand	New Zealand	5–23	12–44	2008 June rugby union tests
2	6 February 2010	Twickenham Stadium, London, England	Wales	18–0	30–17	2010 Six Nations Championship
3	12 February 2011	Twickenham Stadium, London, England	Italy	40–6	59–13	2011 Six Nations Championship
4	23 June 2012	Nelson Mandela Bay Stadium, Port Elizabeth, South Africa	South Africa	8–3	14–14	2012 June rugby union tests
5	2 February 2013	Twickenham Stadium, London, England	Scotland	36–18	38–18	2013 Six Nations Championship
6	22 February 2014	Twickenham Stadium, London, England	Ireland	11–10	13–10	2014 Six Nations Championship
7	9 March 2014	Twickenham Stadium, London, England	Wales	5–0	29–18	2014 Six Nations Championship
8	19 March 2016	Stade de France, Paris, France	France	8–3	31–21	2016 Six Nations Championship
9	26 February 2017	Twickenham Stadium, London, England	Italy	10–10	35–16	2017 Six Nations Championship
10	11 March 2017	Twickenham Stadium, London, England	Scotland	52–21	61–21	2017 Six Nations Championship
11	11 March 2017	Twickenham Stadium, London, England	Scotland	59–21	61–21	2017 Six Nations Championship
12	17 June 2017	Estadio Brigadier General Estanislao López, Santa Fe, Argentina	Argentina	23–18	35–25	2017 England rugby union tour of Argentina
13	18 November 2017	Twickenham Stadium, London, England	Australia	30–6	30–6	2017 end-of-year rugby union internationals
14	17 November 2018	Twickenham Stadium, London, England	Japan	5–0	35–15	2018 end-of-year rugby union internationals
15	7 October 2023	Stade Pierre-Mauroy, Lille, France	Samoa	16–17	18–17	2023 Rugby World Cup

as of 8 October 2023

== Honours ==
England

- 3× Six Nations Championship: 2011, 2016, 2017
- 4× Six Nations Championship runner-up: 2009, 2013, 2014, 2015
- 1x Rugby World Cup third place: 2023

Harlequins

- 2× Premiership Rugby: 2012, 2021
- 1× EPCR Challenge Cup: 2011
- 1× EPCR Challenge Cup runner-up: 2016

England Sevens

- 1× Commonwealth Youth Games silver medalist: 2004
- 1× Commonwealth Games silver medalist: 2006
