= Alberto Sgarbi =

Italy international rugby union player

- Born: Alberto Sgarbi; 26 November 1986 (age 39) Montebelluna, Veneto, Italy
- Height: 1.92 m (6 ft 3 1/2 in)
- Weight: 101 kg (223 lb)

Rugby union career
- Position: Centre
Senior career
Years	Team	Apps	(Points)
2004−2006	San Marco	21	(50)
2006–2021	Benetton	249	(130)
2021−2022	Petrarca Padova	16	(10)
- Correct as of 8 June 2014
International career
Years	Team	Apps	(Points)
2010	Italy A	3	(5)
2008–2014	Italy	29	(10)
- Correct as of 7 Jun 2014

Alberto Sgarbi (born 26 November 1986 in Montebelluna) is an Italian rugby union former player who played at Centre for the Italian national team. He represented italy on 29 occasions with 2 tries.

== Benetton Rugby ==
Sgarbi joined Benetton Treviso in the 2006–07 season, with a few appearances in the Super 10 Italian Premiership and the Heineken Cup.

In the 2007–08 season Sgarbi has been highlighted in the match against Amatori Catania, in which he scored 4 personal tries and was elected "Man of the Match". At the end of the season will be 7 individual tries scored.

The 2009–10 season was the maturation of the player, with the capture of three titles (Super 10 Italian Premiership, Italian Cup and Italian Super Cup), 5 tries and best individual performance in the Heineken Cup, where he played every match in the XV holder.

On 4 September 2010 he debuted in the then-Celtic League with Benetton Treviso in the historic 34-28 victory against Scarlets of Wales. He played with Benetton until 2020–21 Pro14 season.

In 2021−2022 season he played for Petrarca Padova in the ItalianTop10.

== Italy ==
After being launched in the National youth teams, Sgarbi was part of the Italy "A" in the IRB Nations Cup 2007 and was called in Italy to prepare the World Cup in France in 2007.

He was called up to the Italy squad for the 2008 Six Nations Championship and he get his first Italian International cap against England on 10 February 2008.

He participated in the 2010 IRB Nations Cup with Italy and scoring his first points for an Italy team, thanks to a try during the final match of the event against Romania.

He returned with the Italy squad at the end of July 2010 and in autumn 2010, thanks to excellent start to the season in the Celtic League, Sgarbi was used by Nick Mallett from the first minute in the two Test Matches against Australia and Fiji.

At the 2011 Six Nations Championship he was deployed from the first minute in the opening match against Ireland. On 21 August 2011, he was named in the final 31-man squad for the 2011 Rugby World Cup.
