= Andrea Masi =

Italian rugby union rugby player

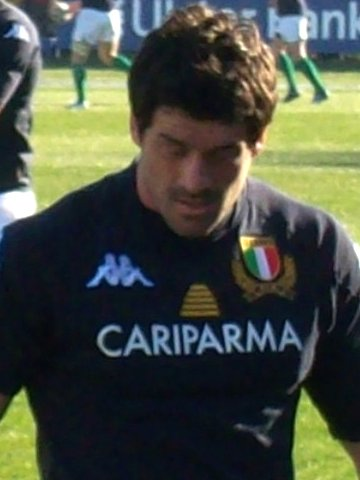
- Born: Andrea Masi; 30 March 1981 (age 45) L'Aquila, Abruzzo, Italy
- Height: 1.86 m (6 ft 1 in)
- Weight: 105 kg (16 st 7 lb; 231 lb)

Rugby union career
- Position: Centre / Fullback / Wing / Fly-half
Senior career
Years	Team	Apps	(Points)
1997–2003	L'Aquila	103	(159)
2003–2006	Viadana	44	(50)
2006–2009	Biarritz Olympique	45	(20)
2009–2011	Racing 92	33	(20)
2011–2012	Aironi	8	(0)
2012–2016	Wasps	59	(20)
- Correct as of 28 August 2015
International career
Years	Team	Apps	(Points)
1999–2015	Italy	95	(65)
- Correct as of 19 September 2015
Coaching career
- Years: Team
- 2020–2021: Wasps Academy(assistant coach)
- 2021−2023: Benetton (assistant coach)
- 2023−: RC Toulonnais (assistant coach)

Andrea Masi (born 30 March 1981) is a retired Italian rugby union footballer. His usual position was in the centres but he has also played at fly-half and at full-back. His last club before retirement was the English Premiership club Wasps. In a 16-year international career lasting from 1999 to 2015, Masi won 95 caps for the Italy national team, and was a part of their squad at four World Cups in 2003, 2007, 2011 and 2015.

Masi was born in L'Aquila, Abruzzo. He was recognized as a talented player at an early age, and he made his debut for L'Aquila at the age of 16. He was soon called up for national selection, and made his international debut for Italy against Spain in 1999. He became a regular in the Italian squad, but did not feature in the Six Nations until 2003 when he appeared against England.

He joined Viadana in 2003 and was also included in Italy's squad for the World Cup in Australia that year. He had his 2005 season disrupted by injury. In the 2008 Six Nations Championship, new coach Nick Mallett played Masi at fly-half, a role he had not played before but many experts believed this move was unsuccessful and he was moved to full-back for the start of the 2009 Six Nations Championship.

In March 2011, Masi was named the 2011 Six Nations Player of the Championship. Masi scored Italy's late try in their first ever Championship win against France.

In June 2011 he joined the Pro12 Italian franchise Aironi. However, the team was discontinued in 2012, and Masi moved to England to join Wasps.

In 2016, Masi retired from playing and subsequently took up a position as a coach for the Wasps academy. In 2021, Masi left Wasps for a return to Italy in a coaching role for Benetton Rugby.
