= Ben Foden =

England international rugby union player

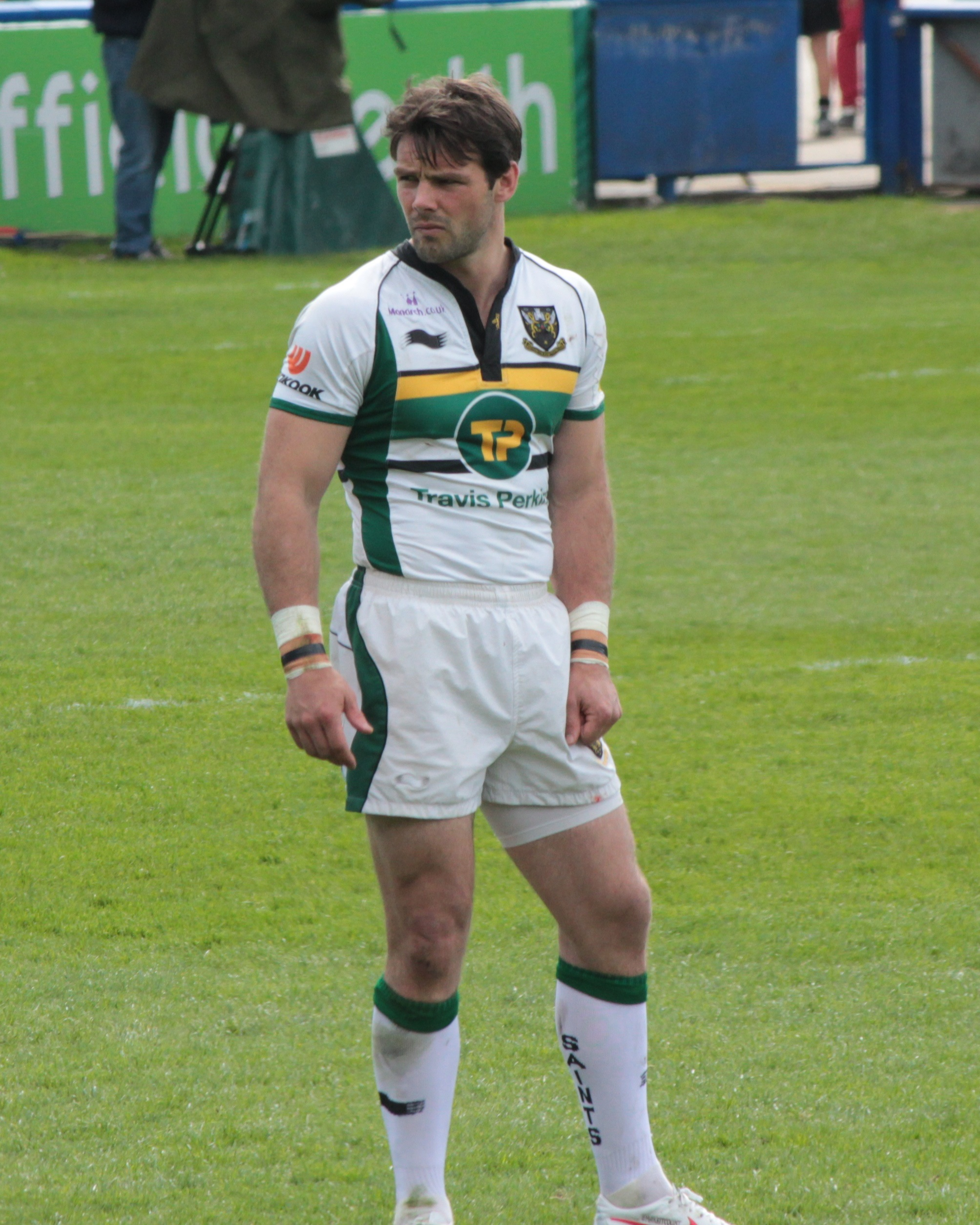
- Ben Foden playing for Northampton in 2012
- Born: Benjamin James Foden; 22 July 1985 (age 41) Chester, England
- Height: 1.83 m (6 ft 0 in)
- Weight: 93 kg (14 st 9 lb)
- School: Bromsgrove School; Tarporley High School; Bishop Heber High School
- University: Manchester University

Rugby union career
- Position(s): Fullback, Wing
Youth career
- Crewe & Nantwich, Sandbach, Chester
Senior career
Years	Team	Apps	(Points)
2004–2008	Sale Sharks	54	(50)
2008–2018	Northampton Saints	250	(290)
2019–2022	Rugby United New York	35	(20)
- Correct as of 1 May 2022
International career
Years	Team	Apps	(Points)
- England U16
- England U19
2005–2006	England U21	2	(0)
2007–2008	England A		
2009–2013	England	34	(35)

Benjamin James Foden (born 22 July 1985) is a former English rugby union player who played for Rugby United New York (RUNY) in Major League Rugby (MLR). A fullback or scrum-half, he won 34 caps for England between 2009 and 2013. He also played as a Wing.

== Career ==
Foden's career has been divided between playing at scrum-half and fullback, though he can also operate on the wing. In an interview in March 2009, Foden accepted that his future lay at playing fullback.

Foden played for Cheshire and North of England U16s, and England U16s. He then went on to play for England U19s, and England Counties.

=== Club ===
He joined Sale Sharks in 2004. Foden's desire to play scrum half saw him sign for Northampton Saints on the basis of a promise to play him at his preferred position; a promise that Sale Sharks could not give him, considering his strong performances at full-back, and the club presence of England international scrum-half Richard Wigglesworth and the arrival of Welsh international Dwayne Peel for the next season. In the 2005–2006 season, Foden played as a replacement in the final as Sale won their first ever Premiership title.

He gained his nickname of "Pop Idol" or "Pops" by missing the first day of pre-season with the Sharks for an audition on the programme.

He began his Northampton Saints career competing with Lee Dickson for the scrum half position; Dickson won the battle for the scrum half shirt, and Northampton frequently used Foden at full back. In the 2008–09 season, he helped the Saints win the European Challenge Cup.

In March 2011, following a Saints win over Wasps, Foden was arrested following an altercation with a taxi driver in London, but both Northampton and the RFU were happy to let the issue lie after he accepted a police caution.

In May 2014, Foden won the Aviva Premiership title with Northampton, playing 80 minutes plus extra time in the final against Saracens at full back and scoring a try.

Foden played on the wing for most of the 2016–17 season, scoring five tries. The most recent of those tries came as Saints secured their place in the European Rugby Champions Cup for the following campaign as they fought off Stade Français Paris in the European Champions Cup play-off final.

After a decade with the club Northampton confirmed that Foden would be leaving at the end of the 2017–18 season. In July 2018, Rugby United New York announced that they had signed Foden for the 2019 Major League Rugby Season.

=== International ===
Foden was included in the England U21s team for the 2005 Six Nations and World Championships, and the 2006 Six Nations and World Championship. Foden was a member of the 2006 Grand Slam winning England U21 squad, playing in all five matches and notching up three tries. He went on to play at the 2006 Under 21 Rugby World Championship later that year, sharing the number 9 jersey with Danny Care. He played for the England Sevens in 2006–2007 and 2007–2008, and the England Saxons at the 2008 Churchill Cup against USA before being included in the England Elite Playing Squad.

Foden was named in the England squad for the Six Nations on 14 January 2009, and earned his first cap for the England v Italy match on 7 February 2009 when he came on as a replacement at scrum-half for Harry Ellis, with England winning 36–11.

Foden was included in the England squad for the 2009 summer tour against the Barbarians and Argentina and made his first start for England in the uncapped game against the Barbarians on 30 May 2009, a game which saw him playing on the wing and scoring a try in the 32nd minute.

Despite fullback Delon Armitage being injured for the 2009 Investec Autumn Internationals, Foden was not included in the squad – manager Martin Johnson instead preferring to play wings Ugo Monye and Mark Cueto out of position. By the 2010 Six Nations, Armitage was fit again, though a series of below par performances saw Foden seize the 15 shirt, with substitute performances against Ireland and Scotland, before gaining his first Test start against France. An improved performance by the England side saw Foden score his first try in a Test match, though the team lost 12–10.

Foden retained his starting place for the summer tour to Australia, playing with club colleague Chris Ashton. Although England lost the first Test, they won the second 20–21. He also featured as a replacement in an uncapped game for England against the New Zealand Maori side.

Foden was named in the elite player squad for the 2010–11 season. Later that year he cemented his place as England's first-choice fullback, his early flirtation with scrum-half shelved after some strong form. Foden was a key member of the side that beat Australia twice in 2010 and also started all of England's Six Nations games as they came up short of a Grand Slam in 2011. He gained more metres (100.6) in the 2011 6 Nations than any other player in the Championship. Foden was selected for England's 2011 World Cup squad, holding off the challenge of Delon Armitage to retain the fullback shirt during England's disappointing campaign.

=== Television ===
In October 2019, Foden was a contestant in The X Factor: Celebrity as a member of the group, Try Star, alongside Levi Davis and Thom Evans. They were eliminated in the semi-final, finishing in fifth place.

In January 2022, Foden was a contestant on the fourteenth series of Dancing on Ice. He was paired with Robin Johnstone and they were the first couple to be eliminated.

== International tries ==
Try	Opposing team	Location	Venue	Competition	Date	Result
†	Barbarian F.C.	London, England	Twickenham	Summer International	30 May 2009	Lost
1	France	Paris, France	Stade de France	Six Nations	20 March 2010	Lost
2	South Africa	London, England	Twickenham	Test match	27 November 2010	Lost
3	France	London, England	Twickenham	Six Nations	26 February 2011	Won
4	Romania	Dunedin, New Zealand	Dunedin	World Cup	24 September 2011	Won
5	France	Auckland, New Zealand	Eden Park	World Cup	8 October 2011	Lost
6	France	Paris, France	Stade de France	2012 Six Nations	11 March 2012	Won
7	South Africa	Durban, South Africa	Mr Price Kings Park	Test match	9 June 2012	Lost

† Full international cap not awarded for Barbarians Test match

== Personal life ==
Foden married Una Healy of girl group The Saturdays on 30 June 2012 in her native Ireland. They have two children, daughter Aoife (b.2012) and son Tadhg (b.2015). In July 2018, it was announced that Foden and Healy had separated. Foden married Jackie Belanoff-Smith in 2019. On 20 May 2020, Jackie gave birth to their daughter Farrah. Ben Foden is the Scarborough RUFC Head Coach and Director of Rugby at Scarborough College.
