= Ross Ford =

British Lions & Scotland international rugby union player

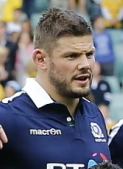
- Ford in 2017
- Born: Ross William Ford; 23 April 1984 (age 42) Edinburgh, Scotland
- Height: 6 ft 1 in (1.85 m)
- Weight: 115 kg (18 st 2 lb; 254 lb)
- School: Kelso High School
- Occupation(s): Strength and conditioning coach

Rugby union career
- Position: Hooker
Amateur team(s)
| Years | Team | Apps | (Points) |
- Kelso RFC
- Correct as of 18 October 2007
Senior career
| Years | Team | Apps | (Points) |
| 2004–2007 | Border Reivers | 94 | (5) |
| 2007 | Glasgow Warriors | 0 | (0) |
| 2007–2019 | Edinburgh Rugby | 197 | (60) |
International career
| Years | Team | Apps | (Points) |
| 2004–2019 | Scotland | 110 | (25) |
| 2009 | British & Irish Lions | 1 | (0) |
- Correct as of 24 June 2017
Coaching career
- Years: Team
- 2019-: Scottish Rugby Academy (Strength & Conditioning)

Ross William Ford (born 23 April 1984) is a Scottish former rugby union player who is currently strength and conditioning coach for the Scottish Rugby Academy. He made 110 test appearances as a hooker for Scotland, making him their highest-capped male player. He played in three World Cups (2007, 2011 and 2015) and toured with the British & Irish Lions in 2009, making one appearance.

Ford played professional rugby for Border Reivers (2002–2007) and Edinburgh Rugby (2007-2019).

== Rugby Union career ==
=== Amateur career ===
Ross Ford grew up in Kelso in the Scottish Borders and attended the town's high school. He played for Kelso Harlequins (U18) and then Kelso RFC.

=== Professional career ===
In May 2002, Ford signed for Border Reivers, before he had finished school.

Ford initially played in the back row, but was convinced to switch to hooker while at Border Reivers.

After the Reivers disbandment in the summer of 2007, Ford was left without a club. He initially signed for the Glasgow Warriors in August 2007 but on 18 October 2007 it was announced that he had been transferred to Edinburgh who were back under the Scottish Rugby Union's control in that year.

Ford made his 150th appearance for Edinburgh in December 2015.

=== International career ===
Ford was a member of the Scotland 7s squad at the 2002 Commonwealth Games in Manchester.

Ford captained Scotland under-16 and has also represented his country at under-18 and under-19 level. He is a member of the Scottish Institute of Sport.

Ford was first capped by the Scotland senior side in the 2004 Abbey Autumn Tests against Australia at Murrayfield, making his second appearance over a year later, coming on as a replacement against Wales in the 2006 RBS 6 Nations. After one further appearance against England he missed the 2006 summer tour to South Africa through a knee injury but returned to the Scotland squad in the 2007–08 season.

Ford made his first start in the RBS 6 Nations Championship in Scotland's final match of the 2007 competition, away to France. He followed that up by winning plaudits for his line out throwing and play in both tight and loose in Scotland's World Cup warm-up victory against Ireland.

Ford was named in Scotland's Rugby World Cup 2007 squad, and became the first-choice hooker after Dougie Hall pulled out of the World Cup with injury. In his first match at the tournament, he came on as a replacement against Portugal and scored his first try for Scotland.

In 2009, Ford was selected for the British & Irish Lions as a replacement for Jerry Flannery. He played for 50 minutes in the third test and was Scotland's only representative in the three test matches of that tour. Ford was the captain of the Scotland Team for the 2012 Six Nations Championship and the 2012 mid-year rugby test series.

In June 2014, Ford made his 76th appearance, overtaking Gordon Bulloch as Scotland's hughest-capped hooker; and in August 2015 he won his 88th cap against Italy, overtaking Scott Murray as Scotland's most capped forward. His centenary cap came against Australia in November 2016, joining Chris Paterson and Sean Lamont in winning a centenary of caps for Scotland.

On 24 June 2017, Ford made his 110th test appearance for Scotland, overtaking Chris Paterson as the highest-capped Scottish player.

=== Coaching career ===
On 27 June 2019, Ford announced his retirement from playing. Afterward, he took up a role as a strength and conditioning coach at the Scottish Rugby Academy.

== Other ==
In 2011, Ford appeared on cereal boxes for Scott's Porage Oats alongside Scotland teammates Chris Paterson and Thom Evans.
