= Hendre Fourie =

England international rugby union player

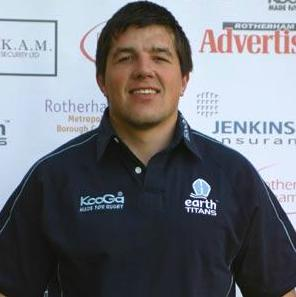
- Born: Carel Hendrik Fourie; 19 September 1979 (age 47) Burgersdorp, South Africa
- Height: 1.83 m (6 ft 0 in)
- Weight: 105 kg (16 st 7 lb)

Rugby union career
- Position: Openside Flanker
- Current team: Sale Sharks
Senior career
Years	Team	Apps	(Points)
2005–07	Rotherham	52	(75)
2007–11	Leeds Carnegie	71	(95)
2011–13	Sale Sharks	3	(5)
- Correct as of 12 May 2012
International career
Years	Team	Apps	(Points)
2010–13	England Saxons	1	(0)
2010–11	England	8	(0)
- Correct as of 13 November 2011

Carel Hendrik Fourie, generally known as Hendre Fourie (born 19 September 1979 in Burgersdorp, Eastern Cape), is a retired South African professional Rugby footballer who finished his career playing for Aviva Premiership side Sale Sharks after signing from Leeds Carnegie in the Summer of 2011. His preferred position was at Flanker. Although he was born in South Africa, he is qualified for England through residency laws. He made his debut for his adopted nation on Saturday 6 November 2010 as a late replacement in a defeat to New Zealand at Twickenham.

Known to his teammates as 'Shrek,' Fourie moved to England in 2005 when he signed for Rotherham Titans. He was a central figure as Rotherham beat Leeds twice in the 2006–07 season, and reluctantly elected to move to Headingley after they were narrowly promoted as champions of National One.

Fourie was a relatively late developer at an elite level, only realising his potential under the tutelage of his mentor Andre Bester at the Rotherham Titans. This development was characterised by two significant changes in this game, the spin in the tackle and being more selective in hitting rucks. These changes combined with his raw power and his rucking technique allowed him to make a significant impact when hitting the Premiership scene with Leeds Carnegie.

Fourie was forced to retire from professional rugby union on 3 January 2013 due to a persistent shoulder injury.
