= Max Evans (rugby union) =

Scotland international rugby union player

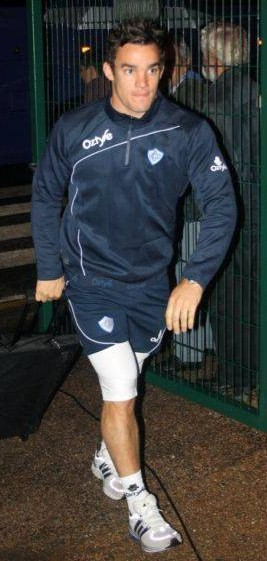
- Born: Maxwell Brian Evans; 12 September 1983 (age 43) Torquay, England
- Height: 1.75 m (5 ft 9 in)
- Weight: 87.9 kg (13 st 12 lb)
- School: Wellington College, Berkshire
- Notable relative(s): Thom Evans (brother); Chris Evans (cousin)
- Occupation: former rugby union footballer

Rugby union career
- Position(s): Centre, Wing
- Current team: Free Agent
Amateur team(s)
Years	Team	Apps	(Points)
2005–06	London Scottish		
Senior career
Years	Team	Apps	(Points)
2007–2011	Glasgow Warriors	63	(50)
2011–2015	Castres	60	(25)
- Correct as of 3 January 2015
International career
Years	Team	Apps	(Points)
2008–2014	Scotland	44	(15)
- Correct as of 25 June 2017
National sevens team
Years	Team		Comps
2007	Scotland		3

Maxwell Brian Evans (born 12 September 1983) is a rugby union player who has won 44 caps for Scotland. He plays at centre and wing, and has been without a club since being released by Castres at the end of the 2015 season.

== Early life and education ==
Evans was born in Torquay, England. He attended Wellington College with his brother and former Scottish international, Thom, as well as friends and former rugby team mates James Haskell and Paul Doran-Jones of Wasps RFC.

== Career ==
Evans played golf professionally in Portugal from 2004–06 while recovering from a back injury suffered while playing for Harlequins' academy side.

Evans played for London Scottish in 2005–06 with former Scottish international Kenny Logan and former Waratahs winger and Australia A & 7's star Matt Dowling.

He earned his first cap for Scotland against Canada in November 2008. He scored his first try for Scotland on 8 February 2009, after coming on as a substitute for his younger brother, Thom, in the 2009 Six Nations Championship match against Wales. Thom, who also played for the Glasgow Warriors, was later forced to retire from rugby on 1 July 2010 as a result of a spinal injury he sustained in Scotland's 2010 Six Nations Championship match against Wales. On 10 May 2009, while playing for Glasgow against the Ospreys, Max sustained an injury to his knee, ruling him out of competition for at least six months.

On 14 February 2011 Evans confirmed he would leave the Glasgow Warriors to join Castres. He was released from Castres in June 2015.

=== Media ===
In November 2017, Evans was revealed as one of the contestants who would take part in the tenth series of Dancing on Ice. He was partnered with professional ice skater Ale Izquierdo. The couple finished in third place on 11 March 2018.

== Personal life ==
He is a cousin of radio presenter Chris Evans.

In 2014, he married Katy Johnson; they separated in December 2016 and eventually divorced. In 2019, he became engaged to Lauren Jamieson, sister of Olympics swimmer Michael Jamieson; they separated the following year. In February 2021, he was reportedly expecting his first child, a daughter, with Debora Casimiro.
