= 2014 Six Nations Championship squads =

Rugby union competition squads

This is a list of the complete squads for the 2014 Six Nations Championship, an annual rugby union tournament contested by the national rugby teams of England, France, Ireland, Italy, Scotland and Wales. Wales are the defending champions.

Note: Number of caps and players' ages are indicated as of 1 February 2014 – the tournament's opening day.

== England ==
On 9 January, England announced their 35-man Squad for the 2014 Six Nations Championship, including 5 uncapped players.

Head coach: (England) Stuart Lancaster

- Caps updated: 15 January 2014

Note: Flags indicate national union for the club/province as defined by World Rugby.

Player	Position	Date of birth (age)	Caps	Club/province
Dylan Hartley	Hooker	24 March 1986 (aged 27)	50	(England) Northampton Saints
Rob Webber	Hooker	1 August 1986 (aged 27)	5	(England) Bath
Tom Youngs	Hooker	28 January 1987 (aged 27)	12	(England) Leicester Tigers
Dan Cole	Prop	9 May 1987 (aged 26)	43	(England) Leicester Tigers
Joe Marler	Prop	7 July 1990 (aged 23)	15	(England) Harlequins
Matt Mullan	Prop	23 February 1987 (aged 26)	2	(England) London Wasps
Henry Thomas	Prop	30 October 1991 (aged 22)	2	(England) Sale Sharks
Mako Vunipola	Prop	13 January 1991 (aged 23)	10	(England) Saracens
Dave Attwood	Lock	5 April 1987 (aged 26)	5	(England) Bath
Joe Launchbury	Lock	12 April 1991 (aged 22)	14	(England) London Wasps
Courtney Lawes	Lock	23 February 1989 (aged 24)	25	(England) Northampton Saints
Ed Slater	Lock	1 August 1988 (aged 25)	0	(England) Leicester Tigers
Tom Johnson	Flanker	16 July 1982 (aged 31)	5	(England) Exeter Chiefs
Matt Kvesic	Flanker	14 April 1992 (aged 21)	2	(England) Gloucester
Chris Robshaw (c)	Flanker	4 June 1986 (aged 27)	20	(England) Harlequins
Tom Wood	Flanker	3 November 1986 (aged 27)	23	(England) Northampton Saints
Ben Morgan	Number 8	18 February 1989 (aged 24)	15	(England) Gloucester
Billy Vunipola	Number 8	3 November 1992 (aged 21)	5	(England) Saracens
Danny Care	Scrum-half	2 January 1987 (aged 27)	42	(England) Harlequins
Lee Dickson	Scrum-half	29 March 1985 (aged 28)	12	(England) Northampton Saints
Ben Youngs	Scrum-half	5 September 1989 (aged 24)	35	(England) Leicester Tigers
Richard Wigglesworth	Scrum-half	9 June 1983 (aged 30)	14	(England) Saracens
Owen Farrell	Fly-half	21 September 1991 (aged 22)	19	(England) Saracens
George Ford	Fly-half	16 March 1993 (aged 20)	0	(England) Bath
Stephen Myler	Fly-half	21 July 1984 (aged 29)	1	(England) Northampton Saints
Brad Barritt	Centre	7 August 1986 (aged 27)	16	(England) Saracens
Luther Burrell	Centre	6 December 1987 (aged 26)	0	(England) Northampton Saints
Kyle Eastmond	Centre	17 July 1989 (aged 24)	2	(England) Bath
Billy Twelvetrees	Centre	15 November 1988 (aged 25)	8	(England) Gloucester
Chris Ashton	Wing	29 March 1987 (aged 26)	37	(England) Saracens
Jonny May	Wing	1 April 1990 (aged 23)	1	(England) Gloucester
Jack Nowell	Wing	11 April 1993 (aged 20)	0	(England) Exeter Chiefs
Anthony Watson	Wing	26 February 1994 (aged 19)	0	(England) Bath
Mike Brown	Fullback	4 September 1985 (aged 28)	21	(England) Harlequins
Alex Goode	Fullback	7 May 1988 (aged 25)	13	(England) Saracens

=== Call-ups ===
On 2 February, Freddie Burns was added to the squad for the Scotland match in round 2.

On 16 February, David Wilson was added to the squad to replace the injured Dan Cole.

On 3 March, Manu Tuilagi and Marland Yarde was added to the squad for the round 4 clash with Wales.

Note: Flags indicate national union for the club/province as defined by World Rugby.

Player	Position	Date of birth (age)	Caps	Club/province
David Wilson	Prop	9 April 1985 (aged 28)	31	(England) Bath
Freddie Burns	Fly-half	13 May 1990 (aged 23)	3	(England) Gloucester
Manu Tuilagi	Centre	18 May 1991 (aged 22)	21	(England) Leicester Tigers
Marland Yarde	Wing	20 April 1992 (aged 21)	2	(England) London Irish

== France ==
On 6 January 2014, France named a 30-man squad for the 2014 Six Nations Championship. Additional players maybe added to the squad throughout the tournament due to the new selection formart the FFR uses during the Six Nations and End-of-year tests.

Head coach: (France) Philippe Saint-André

- Caps updated: 15 January 2014

Note: Flags indicate national union for the club/province as defined by World Rugby.

Player	Position	Date of birth (age)	Caps	Club/province
Benjamin Kayser	Hooker	26 July 1984 (aged 29)	22	(France) Clermont
Dimitri Szarzewski	Hooker	26 January 1983 (aged 31)	75	(France) Racing Métro
Thomas Domingo	Prop	20 August 1985 (aged 28)	28	(France) Clermont
Yannick Forestier	Prop	3 January 1982 (aged 32)	8	(France) Castres
Nicolas Mas	Prop	23 May 1980 (aged 33)	66	(France) Montpellier
Rabah Slimani	Prop	18 October 1989 (aged 24)	3	(France) Stade Français
Alexandre Flanquart	Lock	9 October 1989 (aged 24)	2	(France) Stade Français
Yoann Maestri	Lock	14 January 1988 (aged 26)	20	(France) Toulouse
Pascal Papé	Lock	5 October 1980 (aged 33)	49	(France) Stade Français
Sébastien Vahaamahina	Lock	21 October 1991 (aged 22)	9	(France) Perpignan
Antoine Burban	Flanker	22 July 1987 (aged 26)	0	(France) Stade Français
Thierry Dusautoir (c)	Flanker	18 November 1981 (aged 32)	65	(France) Toulouse
Bernard Le Roux	Flanker	4 June 1989 (aged 24)	3	(France) Racing Métro
Yannick Nyanga	Flanker	19 December 1983 (aged 30)	34	(France) Toulouse
Damien Chouly	Number 8	27 November 1985 (aged 28)	13	(France) Clermont
Louis Picamoles	Number 8	5 February 1986 (aged 27)	38	(France) Toulouse
Jean-Marc Doussain	Scrum-half	12 February 1991 (aged 22)	5	(France) Toulouse
Maxime Machenaud	Scrum-half	30 December 1988 (aged 25)	11	(France) Racing Métro
Jules Plisson	Fly-half	20 August 1991 (aged 22)	0	(France) Stade Français
Rémi Talès	Fly-half	2 May 1984 (aged 29)	5	(France) Castres
Mathieu Bastareaud	Centre	17 September 1988 (aged 25)	18	(France) Toulon
Gaël Fickou	Centre	26 March 1994 (aged 19)	3	(France) Toulouse
Wesley Fofana	Centre	20 January 1988 (aged 26)	21	(France) Clermont
Maxime Mermoz	Centre	28 July 1986 (aged 27)	25	(France) Toulon
Sofiane Guitoune	Wing	27 March 1989 (aged 24)	2	(France) Perpignan
Yoann Huget	Wing	2 June 1987 (aged 26)	22	(France) Toulouse
Maxime Médard	Wing	16 November 1986 (aged 27)	36	(France) Toulouse
Geoffrey Palis	Fullback	8 July 1991 (aged 22)	0	(France) Castres
Hugo Bonneval	Fullback	19 November 1990 (aged 23)	0	(France) Stade Français
Brice Dulin	Fullback	13 April 1990 (aged 23)	10	(France) Castres

=== Call-ups ===
On 20 January, Captain Thierry Dusautoir and Wing Sofiane Guitoune withdrew from the squad due to injury and were replaced by Virgile Bruni and Jean-Marcellin Buttin. Pascal Papé was named the new Captain. On 25 January, François Trinh-Duc was called up to the squad to cover Rémi Talès, who will miss the opening match against England due to injury.

On 10 February, Ibrahim Diarra and Alexandre Lapandry were added to the squad for the round 3 clash with Wales. In addition to Diarra and Lapandry, Marc Andreu, Vincent Debaty, Wenceslas Lauret and Brice Mach were also called up to the squad to face Wales.

On 24 February, Antonie Claassen, Rémi Lamerat and Morgan Parra were added to the squad for the final two rounds against Scotland and Ireland.

Following an injury Dimitri Szarzewski sustained while playing for his club, Guilhem Guirado was called up to the squad on the 2 March to replace Szarzewski for the clash against Scotland.

Note: Flags indicate national union for the club/province as defined by World Rugby.

Player	Position	Date of birth (age)	Caps	Club/province
Guilhem Guirado	Hooker	17 June 1986 (aged 27)	18	(France) Perpignan
Brice Mach	Hooker	2 April 1986 (aged 27)	0	(France) Castres
Vincent Debaty	Prop	2 October 1981 (aged 32)	20	(France) Clermont
Virgile Bruni	Flanker	6 February 1989 (aged 24)	0	(France) Toulon
Ibrahim Diarra	Flanker	25 May 1983 (aged 30)	1	(France) Castres
Alexandre Lapandry	Flanker	13 April 1989 (aged 24)	8	(France) Clermont
Wenceslas Lauret	Flanker	28 March 1989 (aged 24)	5	(France) Biarritz
Antonie Claassen	Number 8	20 October 1984 (aged 29)	4	(France) Castres
Morgan Parra	Scrum-half	15 November 1988 (aged 25)	54	(France) Clermont
François Trinh-Duc	Fly-half	11 November 1986 (aged 27)	48	(France) Montpellier
Rémi Lamerat	Centre	14 January 1990 (aged 24)	0	(France) Castres
Marc Andreu	Wing	27 December 1985 (aged 28)	7	(France) Castres
Jean-Marcellin Buttin	Wing	16 December 1991 (aged 22)	2	(France) Clermont

== Ireland ==
On 27 January 2014, Ireland announced an extended 34-man squad for the 2014 Six Nations Championship. Additional players could be added, as the first original 34-man squad was only named for the opening two fixtures; Scotland and Wales.

Head coach: (New Zealand) Joe Schmidt

- Caps updated: 15 January 2014

Note: Flags indicate national union for the club/province as defined by World Rugby.

Player	Position	Date of birth (age)	Caps	Club/province
Rory Best	Hooker	15 August 1982 (aged 31)	70	(Ireland) Ulster
Seán Cronin	Hooker	6 May 1986 (aged 27)	30	(Ireland) Leinster
Cian Healy	Prop	7 October 1987 (aged 26)	42	(Ireland) Leinster
Jack McGrath	Prop	11 October 1989 (aged 24)	3	(Ireland) Leinster
Martin Moore	Prop	1 March 1991 (aged 22)	0	(Ireland) Leinster
Mike Ross	Prop	21 December 1979 (aged 34)	34	(Ireland) Leinster
Iain Henderson	Lock	21 February 1992 (aged 21)	6	(Ireland) Ulster
Mike McCarthy	Lock	27 November 1981 (aged 32)	15	(Ireland) Leinster
Paul O'Connell (c)	Lock	20 October 1979 (aged 34)	88	(Ireland) Munster
Devin Toner	Lock	29 June 1986 (aged 27)	10	(Ireland) Leinster
Dan Tuohy	Lock	18 June 1985 (aged 28)	7	(Ireland) Ulster
Chris Henry	Flanker	17 October 1984 (aged 29)	9	(Ireland) Ulster
Jordi Murphy	Flanker	22 April 1991 (aged 22)	0	(Ireland) Leinster
Tommy O'Donnell	Flanker	21 May 1987 (aged 26)	2	(Ireland) Munster
Peter O'Mahony	Flanker	17 September 1989 (aged 24)	19	(Ireland) Munster
Rhys Ruddock	Flanker	13 November 1990 (aged 23)	1	(Ireland) Leinster
Robin Copeland	Number 8	23 October 1987 (aged 26)	0	(Wales) Cardiff Blues
Jamie Heaslip	Number 8	15 December 1983 (aged 30)	60	(Ireland) Leinster
Conor Murray	Scrum-half	20 April 1989 (aged 24)	22	(Ireland) Munster
Eoin Reddan	Scrum-half	20 November 1980 (aged 33)	52	(Ireland) Leinster
Paddy Jackson	Fly-half	5 January 1992 (aged 22)	5	(Ireland) Ulster
Ian Madigan	Fly-half	21 March 1989 (aged 24)	7	(Ireland) Leinster
Johnny Sexton	Fly-half	11 July 1985 (aged 28)	38	(France) Racing Métro
Darren Cave	Centre	5 April 1987 (aged 26)	5	(Ireland) Ulster
Gordon D'Arcy	Centre	10 February 1980 (aged 33)	75	(Ireland) Leinster
Robbie Henshaw	Centre	12 June 1993 (aged 20)	3	(Ireland) Connacht
Luke Marshall	Centre	3 March 1991 (aged 22)	4	(Ireland) Ulster
Brian O'Driscoll	Centre	21 January 1979 (aged 35)	128	(Ireland) Leinster
Luke Fitzgerald	Wing	13 September 1987 (aged 26)	27	(Ireland) Leinster
David Kearney	Wing	19 June 1989 (aged 24)	2	(Ireland) Leinster
Fergus McFadden	Wing	17 June 1986 (aged 27)	21	(Ireland) Leinster
Andrew Trimble	Wing	20 October 1984 (aged 29)	50	(Ireland) Ulster
Felix Jones	Fullback	5 August 1987 (aged 26)	5	(Ireland) Munster
Rob Kearney	Fullback	26 March 1986 (aged 27)	49	(Ireland) Leinster

=== Call-ups ===
On 29 January, Isaac Boss was added to the squad to cover the injured Eoin Reddan who suffered from a calf injury in training.

On 17 February, Dave Kilcoyne and Donnacha Ryan were added to the squad to face England in round 3.

On 2 March, Robbie Diack, Richardt Strauss and Simon Zebo were called up into the squad that would play Italy in round 4.

Note: Flags indicate national union for the club/province as defined by World Rugby.

Player	Position	Date of birth (age)	Caps	Club/province
Richardt Strauss	Hooker	29 January 1986 (aged 28)	4	(Ireland) Leinster
Dave Kilcoyne	Prop	14 December 1988 (aged 25)	8	(Ireland) Munster
Donnacha Ryan	Lock	11 December 1983 (aged 30)	28	(Ireland) Munster
Robbie Diack	Number 8	12 November 1985 (aged 28)	0	(Ireland) Ulster
Isaac Boss	Scrum-half	9 April 1980 (aged 33)	17	(Ireland) Leinster
Simon Zebo	Wing	16 March 1990 (aged 23)	6	(Ireland) Munster

== Italy ==
On 9 January, Italy announced a 30-man squad for the 2014 Six Nations Championship, featuring 2 uncapped players, and the return of Mirco Bergamasco.

Head coach: (France) Jacques Brunel

- Caps updated: 15 January 2014

Note: Flags indicate national union for the club/province as defined by World Rugby.

Player	Position	Date of birth (age)	Caps	Club/province
Leonardo Ghiraldini	Hooker	26 December 1984 (aged 29)	59	(Italy) Benetton Treviso
Davide Giazzon	Hooker	16 January 1986 (aged 28)	15	(Italy) Zebre
Martin Castrogiovanni	Prop	21 October 1981 (aged 32)	101	(France) Toulon
Lorenzo Cittadini	Prop	17 December 1982 (aged 31)	27	(Italy) Benetton Treviso
Alberto De Marchi	Prop	13 March 1986 (aged 27)	12	(Italy) Benetton Treviso
Michele Rizzo	Prop	16 September 1982 (aged 31)	11	(Italy) Benetton Treviso
Marco Bortolami	Lock	12 June 1980 (aged 33)	99	(Italy) Zebre
Marco Fuser	Lock	9 March 1991 (aged 22)	1	(Italy) Benetton Treviso
Quintin Geldenhuys	Lock	19 June 1981 (aged 32)	41	(Italy) Zebre
Antonio Pavanello	Lock	13 October 1982 (aged 31)	22	(Italy) Benetton Treviso
Robert Barbieri	Flanker	5 June 1984 (aged 29)	32	(Italy) Benetton Treviso
Mauro Bergamasco	Flanker	1 May 1979 (aged 34)	95	(Italy) Zebre
Paul Derbyshire	Flanker	3 November 1986 (aged 27)	20	(Italy) Benetton Treviso
Joshua Furno	Flanker	21 October 1989 (aged 24)	13	(France) Biarritz
Alessandro Zanni	Flanker	31 January 1984 (aged 30)	80	(Italy) Benetton Treviso
Sergio Parisse (c)	Number 8	12 September 1983 (aged 30)	101	(France) Stade Français
Tobias Botes	Scrum-half	26 April 1984 (aged 29)	19	(Italy) Benetton Treviso
Edoardo Gori	Scrum-half	5 March 1990 (aged 23)	29	(Italy) Benetton Treviso
Guglielmo Palazzani	Scrum-half	11 April 1991 (aged 22)	0	(Italy) Zebre
Tommaso Allan	Fly-half	26 April 1993 (aged 20)	3	(France) Perpignan
Luciano Orquera	Fly-half	12 October 1981 (aged 32)	37	(Italy) Zebre
Tommaso Benvenuti	Centre	12 December 1990 (aged 23)	30	(France) Perpignan
Michele Campagnaro	Centre	13 March 1993 (aged 20)	2	(Italy) Benetton Treviso
Gonzalo Garcia	Centre	18 February 1984 (aged 29)	29	(Italy) Zebre
Alberto Sgarbi	Centre	26 November 1986 (aged 27)	27	(Italy) Benetton Treviso
Mirco Bergamasco	Wing	23 February 1983 (aged 30)	89	(Italy) Rovigo
Angelo Esposito	Wing	14 June 1993 (aged 20)	0	(Italy) Benetton Treviso
Tommaso Iannone	Wing	16 September 1990 (aged 23)	6	(Italy) Zebre
Leonardo Sarto	Wing	15 January 1992 (aged 22)	2	(Italy) Zebre
Luke McLean	Fullback	29 June 1987 (aged 26)	52	(Italy) Benetton Treviso

=== Call-ups ===
Francesco Minto was added to the squad on 21 January to cover the injured Marco Fuser who twisted his knee in the Heineken Cup. Matías Agüero was added to the squad to play Scotland to cover the injured Michele Rizzo.

On 3 March, George Biagi, Andrea Masi, Tito Tebaldi and Manoa Vosawai was added to the squad with Biagi replacing the injured Alessandro Zanni.

Note: Flags indicate national union for the club/province as defined by World Rugby.

Player	Position	Date of birth (age)	Caps	Club/province
Matías Agüero	Prop	13 February 1981 (aged 32)	22	(Italy) Zebre
George Biagi	Lock	4 October 1980 (aged 33)	0	(Italy) Zebre
Francesco Minto	Flanker	20 May 1987 (aged 26)	7	(Italy) Benetton Treviso
Manoa Vosawai	Number 8	12 August 1983 (aged 30)	13	(Italy) Benetton Treviso
Tito Tebaldi	Scrum-half	23 September 1987 (aged 26)	16	(Wales) Ospreys
Andrea Masi	Fullback	30 March 1981 (aged 32)	80	(England) London Wasps

== Scotland ==
On January 15, Scotland announced a 36-man squad for the 2014 Six Nations Championship, including 2 uncapped players.

Head coach: (Australia) Scott Johnson (Interim)

- Caps updated: 15 January 2014

Note: Flags indicate national union for the club/province as defined by World Rugby.

Player	Position	Date of birth (age)	Caps	Club/province
Ross Ford	Hooker	23 April 1984 (age 42)	71	(Scotland) Edinburgh
Scott Lawson	Hooker	28 September 1981 (aged 32)	39	(England) Newcastle Falcons
Pat MacArthur	Hooker	27 April 1987 (aged 26)	3	(Scotland) Glasgow Warriors
Geoff Cross	Prop	11 December 1982 (aged 31)	23	(Scotland) Edinburgh
Alasdair Dickinson	Prop	11 September 1983 (aged 30)	30	(Scotland) Edinburgh
Ryan Grant	Prop	8 October 1985 (aged 28)	13	(Scotland) Glasgow Warriors
Moray Low	Prop	28 November 1984 (aged 29)	23	(Scotland) Glasgow Warriors
Grant Gilchrist	Lock	9 August 1990 (aged 23)	4	(Scotland) Edinburgh
Jonny Gray	Lock	14 March 1994 (aged 19)	2	(Scotland) Glasgow Warriors
Richie Gray	Lock	24 August 1989 (aged 24)	33	(France) Castres
Jim Hamilton	Lock	17 November 1982 (aged 31)	50	(France) Montpellier
Kieran Low	Lock	27 January 1991 (aged 23)	1	(England) London Irish
Tim Swinson	Lock	17 February 1987 (aged 26)	3	(Scotland) Glasgow Warriors
Kelly Brown (c)	Flanker	8 June 1982 (aged 31)	60	(England) Saracens
Chris Fusaro	Flanker	21 July 1989 (aged 24)	0	(Scotland) Glasgow Warriors
Rob Harley	Flanker	26 May 1990 (aged 23)	5	(Scotland) Glasgow Warriors
Ross Rennie	Flanker	29 March 1986 (aged 27)	20	(Scotland) Edinburgh
Alasdair Strokosch	Flanker	21 February 1983 (aged 30)	37	(France) Perpignan
Johnnie Beattie	Number 8	21 November 1985 (aged 28)	26	(France) Montpellier
David Denton	Number 8	5 February 1990 (aged 23)	17	(Scotland) Edinburgh
Ryan Wilson	Number 8	18 May 1989 (aged 24)	4	(Scotland) Glasgow Warriors
Chris Cusiter	Scrum-half	13 June 1982 (aged 31)	64	(Scotland) Glasgow Warriors
Greig Laidlaw	Scrum-half	12 October 1985 (aged 28)	24	(Scotland) Edinburgh
Ruaridh Jackson	Fly-half	12 February 1988 (aged 25)	23	(Scotland) Glasgow Warriors
Duncan Weir	Fly-half	10 May 1991 (aged 22)	8	(Scotland) Glasgow Warriors
Nick De Luca	Centre	1 February 1984 (aged 30)	41	(Scotland) Edinburgh
Alex Dunbar	Centre	23 April 1990 (aged 23)	3	(Scotland) Glasgow Warriors
Matt Scott	Centre	30 September 1990 (aged 23)	16	(Scotland) Edinburgh
Duncan Taylor	Centre	5 September 1989 (aged 24)	6	(England) Saracens
Max Evans	Wing	28 September 1983 (aged 30)	37	(France) Castres
Dougie Fife	Wing	8 August 1990 (aged 23)	0	(Scotland) Edinburgh
Sean Lamont	Wing	15 January 1981 (aged 33)	82	(Scotland) Glasgow Warriors
Sean Maitland	Wing	14 September 1988 (aged 25)	8	(Scotland) Glasgow Warriors
Tommy Seymour	Wing	1 July 1988 (aged 25)	5	(Scotland) Glasgow Warriors
Stuart Hogg	Fullback	24 June 1992 (aged 21)	15	(Scotland) Glasgow Warriors
Greig Tonks	Fullback	20 May 1989 (aged 24)	1	(Scotland) Edinburgh

=== Call-ups ===
On 17 February, Jack Cuthbert was added to the squad to face Italy in round 3.

On 3 March, Euan Murray returned to the squad after recovering from an injury he sustained in January. Edinburgh half-back pairing Sean Kennedy and Harry Leonard was also invited to train with the squad ahead of the French match.

Ahead of the final round, Lee Jones and Richie Vernon were considered to play among the backs against Wales.

Note: Flags indicate national union for the club/province as defined by World Rugby.

Player	Position	Date of birth (age)	Caps	Club/province
Euan Murray	Prop	7 August 1980 (aged 33)	58	(England) Worcester Warriors
Richie Vernon	Centre	7 July 1987 (aged 26)	20	(Scotland) Glasgow Warriors
Lee Jones	Wing	28 June 1988 (aged 25)	4	(Scotland) Glasgow Warriors
Jack Cuthbert	Fullback	3 September 1987 (aged 26)	1	(Scotland) Edinburgh

== Wales ==
On 14 January, Wales named a 32-man squad for the 2014 Six Nations Championship

Head Coach: (New Zealand) Warren Gatland

- Caps Updated: 15 January 2014

Note: Flags indicate national union for the club/province as defined by World Rugby.

Player	Position	Date of birth (age)	Caps	Club/province
Richard Hibbard	Hooker	13 December 1983 (aged 30)	26	(Wales) Ospreys
Ken Owens	Hooker	3 January 1987 (aged 27)	19	(Wales) Scarlets
Emyr Phillips	Hooker	22 February 1987 (aged 26)	3	(Wales) Scarlets
Ryan Bevington	Prop	9 December 1988 (aged 25)	12	(Wales) Ospreys
Paul James	Prop	13 May 1982 (aged 31)	48	(England) Bath
Gethin Jenkins	Prop	17 November 1980 (aged 33)	101	(Wales) Cardiff Blues
Adam Jones	Prop	8 March 1981 (aged 32)	89	(Wales) Ospreys
Rhodri Jones	Prop	23 December 1991 (aged 22)	5	(Wales) Scarlets
Samson Lee	Prop	30 November 1992 (aged 21)	3	(Wales) Scarlets
Luke Charteris	Lock	9 March 1983 (aged 30)	43	(France) Perpignan
Andrew Coombs	Lock	27 October 1984 (aged 29)	6	(Wales) Newport Gwent Dragons
Ian Evans	Lock	4 October 1984 (aged 29)	32	(Wales) Ospreys
Alun Wyn Jones	Lock	19 September 1985 (aged 28)	74	(Wales) Ospreys
Ryan Jones	Flanker	13 March 1981 (aged 32)	75	(Wales) Ospreys
Dan Lydiate	Flanker	18 December 1987 (aged 26)	30	(France) Racing Métro
Aaron Shingler	Flanker	7 August 1987 (aged 26)	7	(Wales) Scarlets
Justin Tipuric	Flanker	6 August 1989 (aged 24)	19	(Wales) Ospreys
Sam Warburton (c)	Flanker	5 October 1988 (aged 25)	41	(Wales) Cardiff Blues
Taulupe Faletau	Number 8	12 November 1990 (aged 23)	29	(Wales) Newport Gwent Dragons
Mike Phillips	Scrum-half	29 August 1982 (aged 31)	80	(France) Racing Métro
Rhys Webb	Scrum-half	9 December 1988 (aged 25)	3	(Wales) Ospreys
Rhodri Williams	Scrum-half	5 May 1993 (aged 20)	2	(Wales) Scarlets
Dan Biggar	Fly-half	16 October 1989 (aged 24)	20	(Wales) Ospreys
James Hook	Fly-half	27 June 1985 (aged 28)	73	(France) Perpignan
Rhys Priestland	Fly-half	9 January 1987 (aged 27)	25	(Wales) Scarlets
Jonathan Davies	Centre	5 April 1988 (aged 25)	37	(Wales) Scarlets
Jamie Roberts	Centre	8 November 1986 (aged 27)	53	(France) Racing Métro
Scott Williams	Centre	10 October 1990 (aged 23)	23	(Wales) Scarlets
Alex Cuthbert	Wing	5 April 1990 (aged 23)	19	(Wales) Cardiff Blues
George North	Wing	13 April 1992 (aged 21)	35	(England) Northampton Saints
Leigh Halfpenny	Fullback	22 December 1988 (aged 25)	48	(Wales) Cardiff Blues
Liam Williams	Fullback	9 April 1991 (aged 22)	8	(Wales) Scarlets

=== Call-ups ===
On 20 January, Ryan Jones was withdrawn from the squad due to injury and was replaced with James King. Second rower Jake Ball, who is eligible to play for the Wales through his Welsh-born father, was also added to the squad for Ian Evans.

Note: Flags indicate national union for the club/province as defined by World Rugby.

Player	Position	Date of birth (age)	Caps	Club/province
Jake Ball	Lock	21 June 1991 (aged 22)	0	(Wales) Scarlets
James King	Flanker	24 July 1990 (aged 23)	2	(Wales) Ospreys
