= 2010 Six Nations Championship =

Rugby union tournament

- Date: 6 February – 20 March 2010
- Countries: England; France; Ireland; Italy; Scotland; Wales

Tournament statistics
- Champions: France (17th title)
- Grand Slam: France (9th title)
- Matches played: 15
- Attendance: 1,055,268 (70,351 per match)
- Top point scorer: (Wales) Stephen Jones (63)
- Top try scorers: (Ireland) Keith Earls (3) (Ireland) Tommy Bowe (3) (Wales) James Hook (3) (Wales) Shane Williams (3)
- Player of the tournament: (Ireland) Tommy Bowe

The 2010 Six Nations Championship, known as the 2010 RBS 6 Nations due to sponsorship by the Royal Bank of Scotland, was the 11th series of the Six Nations Championship and the 116th international championship, an annual rugby union competition between the six major European national teams. The tournament was held between 6 February and 20 March 2010.

The championship was contested by England, France, Ireland, Italy, Scotland and Wales. France won the tournament, achieving a final 12–10 victory over England to win the Grand Slam, their first since 2004 and ninth overall (including six in the Five Nations). This was also their 17th outright victory, including 12 victories in the Five Nations, excluding eight titles shared with other countries. France also retained the Giuseppe Garibaldi Trophy by defeating Italy in the tournament, to whom they had (then) never lost within the Six Nations.

Ireland, 2009 Grand Slam winners, came second with three victories and two defeats. Despite defeating England and Wales, Ireland failed to win the Triple Crown after a 23–20 defeat to Scotland in their final match. England and Wales came third and fourth respectively with two victories each, while Scotland and Italy finished in fifth and sixth positions for the third tournament in a row. Both teams achieved just one victory each, with Scotland also recording a draw in the Calcutta Cup match against England to place ahead of Italy.

== Summary ==
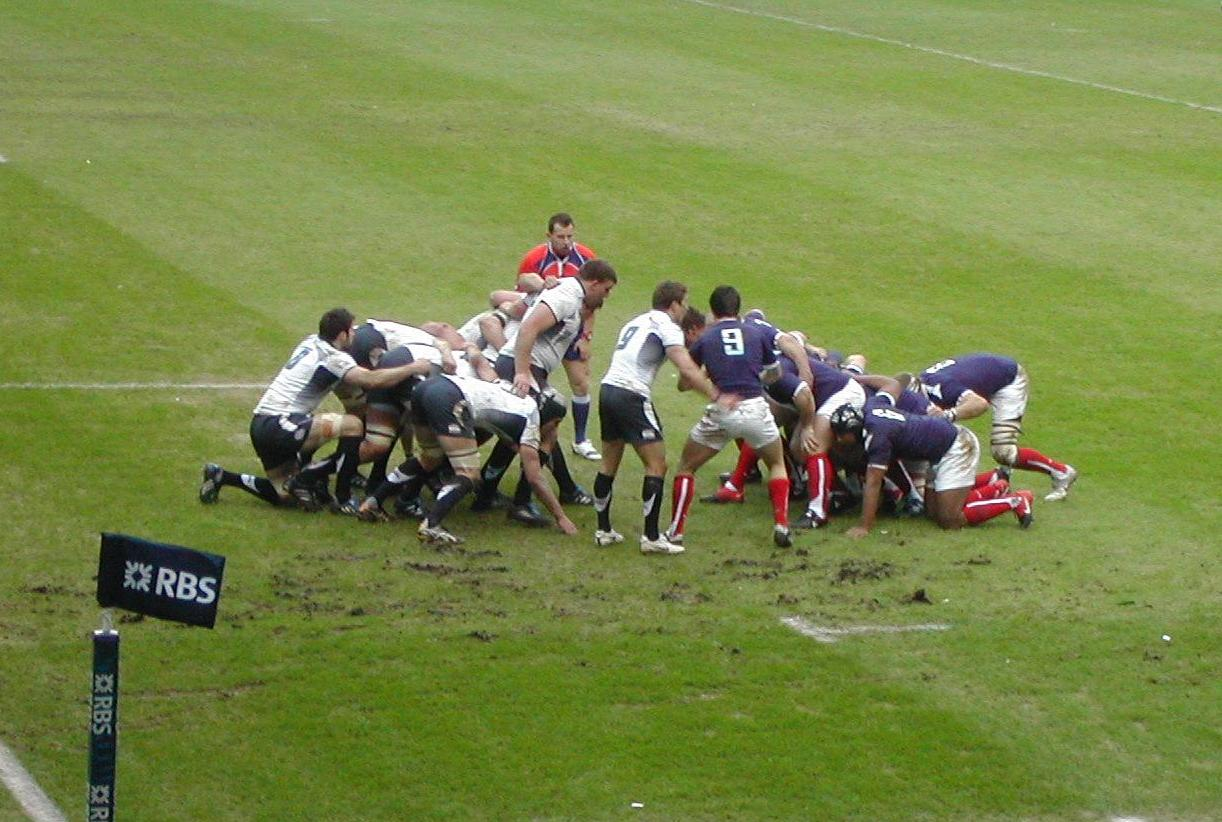
Scrum between Scotland, left, and France, right, 7 February 2010. France won the match 18–9.

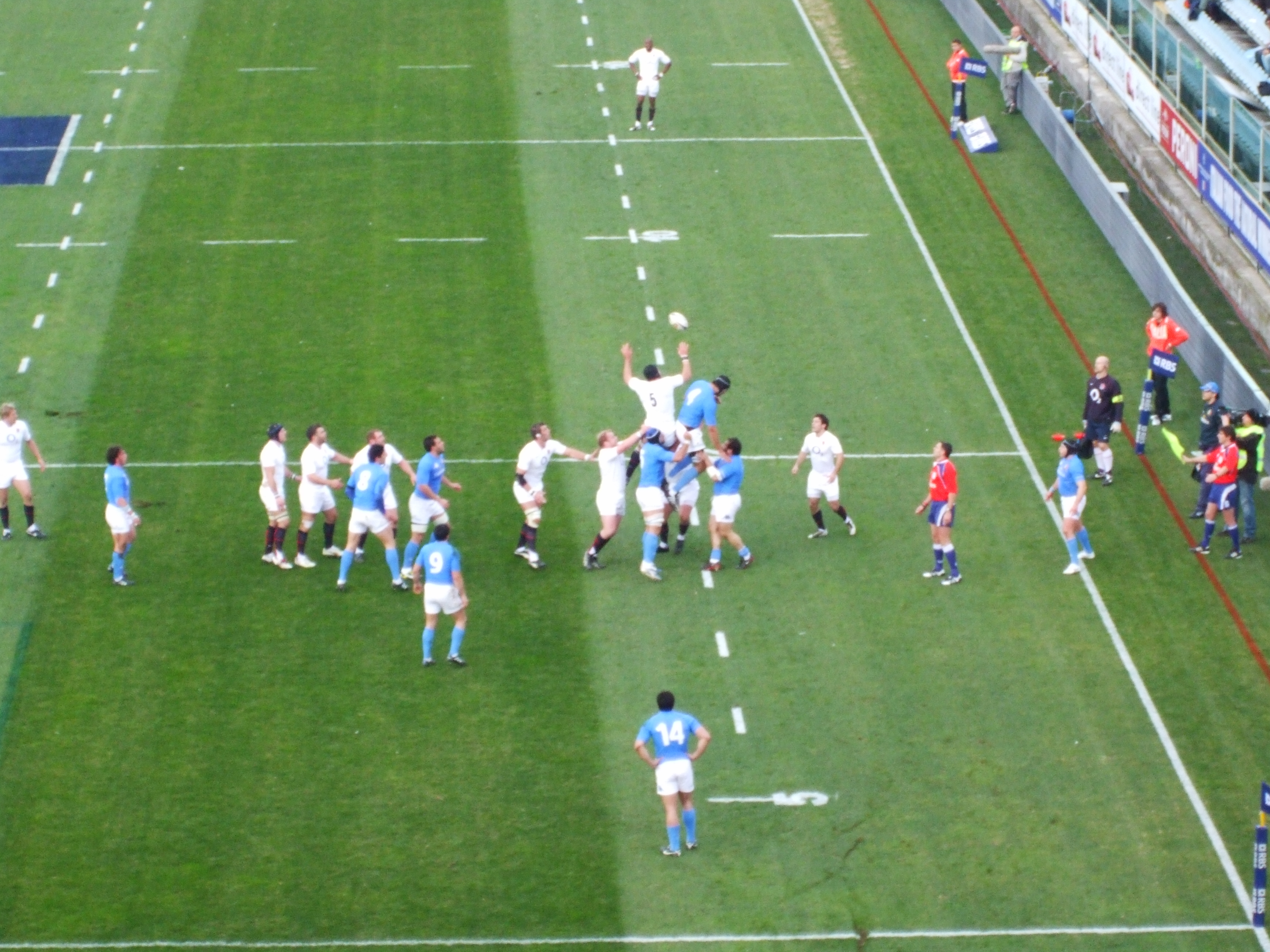
Line-out between England, in white, and Italy, in blue, 14 February 2010. England won the match 17–12.

The reigning champions on entering the tournament were Ireland, who won the Grand Slam and Triple Crown in 2009.

Ireland did not win the Triple Crown in 2010 due to a surprise 23–20 loss to Scotland in the final Six Nations match at Croke Park on 20 March, with Scotland avoiding their third "wooden spoon" since 2004 in the process. Brian O'Driscoll had opened the scoring in the 11th minute and Ireland were level with Scotland in the 64th minute after Tommy Bowe scored a try, with substitute Ronan O'Gara converting. Scotland's Johnnie Beattie scored his team's first try since they played Wales in their second game and Dan Parks scored a penalty in the final minute to prevent Ireland winning the Triple Crown. Ireland coach Declan Kidney described it as "not our greatest day".

Ireland's previous match – a 27–12 victory over Wales on 13 March – had seen O'Driscoll achieve 100 caps for his country. Ireland's previous match against England had seen John Hayes achieve 100 caps for his country, the first player to do so for Ireland.

Ireland's loss to Scotland meant France had won the Championship but could still achieve the Grand Slam by beating England in their final game at the Stade de France on 20 March. The Grand Slam was achieved by France following a 12–10 victory in this game. It was France's first Grand Slam since 2004. England scored the only try of the game. Jonny Wilkinson was not included in the England starting team for only the third time in his career. Bryce Lawrence from New Zealand refereed the game.

The nominations for "Player of the Championship" were announced on 17 March; these were Tommy Bowe (Ireland), Mathieu Bastareaud, Morgan Parra, Thierry Dusautoir, Imanol Harinordoquy (all France) and Shane Williams (Wales). Ireland captain Brian O'Driscoll, who had won the award in three of the four previous seasons, was not included this time. Tommy Bowe was named as the player of the championship on 25 March, having polled nearly 50% of the fan votes.

== Participants ==
Nation	Home stadium	City	Head coach	Captain
England	Twickenham Stadium	London	(England) Martin Johnson	Steve Borthwick/Lewis Moody
France	Stade de France	Saint-Denis	(France) Marc Lièvremont	Thierry Dusautoir
Ireland	Croke Park (Note: The Aviva Stadium (replacing Lansdowne Road) did not open until May 2010, following the redevelopment of the site.)	Dublin	(Republic of Ireland) Declan Kidney	Brian O'Driscoll
Italy	Stadio Flaminio	Rome	(South Africa) Nick Mallett	Leonardo Ghiraldini (Note: Italy's normal captain, Sergio Parisse, was ruled out of the 2010 Six Nations due to a torn ACL suffered in a training session during the November 2009 test series.)
Scotland	Murrayfield Stadium	Edinburgh	(England) Andy Robinson	Mike Blair/Chris Cusiter
Wales	Millennium Stadium	Cardiff	(New Zealand) Warren Gatland	Ryan Jones

== Table ==
Pos	Team	Pld	W	D	L	PF	PA	PD	T	Pts
1	France	5	5	0	0	135	69	+66	13	10
2	Ireland	5	3	0	2	106	95	+11	11	6
3	England	5	2	1	2	88	76	+12	6	5
4	Wales	5	2	0	3	113	117	−4	10	4
5	Scotland	5	1	1	3	83	100	−17	3	3
6	Italy	5	1	0	4	69	137	−68	5	2

Source: ESPN

== Results ==
The schedule for the 2010 Championship was released on 2 April 2009. Following the success of the tournament's first Friday night game, between France and Wales in the 2009 Championship, the organisers scheduled the reverse fixture to also be played on a Friday night.

'c' and 'm' following a try denote 'converted' and 'missed conversion' respectively.

=== Round 1 ===
6 February 2010
14:30 GMT

Ireland	29–11	Italy
Try: Heaslip 15' c O'Leary 35' c Con: O'Gara (2/2); Pen: O'Gara (4/4) 9', 27', 32', 46'; P. Wallace (1/1) 67'	Report	Try: Robertson 39' m Pen: Gower (1/1) 26'; Mi. Bergamasco (1/1) 44'

Croke Park, Dublin
Attendance: 77,686
Referee: Romain Poîte (France)

FB	15	Rob Kearney
RW	14	Tommy Bowe
OC	13	Brian O'Driscoll (c)
IC	12	Gordon D'Arcy
LW	11	Andrew Trimble	(substituted off) 56'
FH	10	Ronan O'Gara	(substituted off) 65'
SH	9	Tomás O'Leary	(substituted off) 73'
N8	8	Jamie Heaslip
OF	7	David Wallace	(substituted off) 72'
BF	6	Kevin McLaughlin
RL	5	Paul O'Connell	(substituted off) 61'
LL	4	Leo Cullen
TP	3	John Hayes	(substituted off) 72'
HK	2	Jerry Flannery	(substituted off) 56'
LP	1	Cian Healy
Replacements:
HK	16	Rory Best	(substituted on) 56'
PR	17	Tom Court	(substituted on) 72'
LK	18	Donnacha Ryan	(substituted on) 61'
FL	19	Seán O'Brien	(substituted on) 72'
SH	20	Eoin Reddan	(substituted on) 73'
CE	21	Paddy Wallace	(substituted on) 65'
WG	22	Keith Earls	(substituted on) 56'
Coach:
Declan Kidney

FB	15	Luke McLean
RW	14	Kaine Robertson	(substituted on) 58'
OC	13	Gonzalo Canale
IC	12	Gonzalo García
LW	11	Mirco Bergamasco
FH	10	Craig Gower	(substituted on) 65'
SH	9	Tito Tebaldi	(substituted on) 65'
N8	8	Alessandro Zanni
OF	7	Mauro Bergamasco
BF	6	Josh Sole
RL	5	Quintin Geldenhuys
LL	4	Carlo Del Fava	(substituted on) 49'
TP	3	Martin Castrogiovanni	(substituted on) 56'
HK	2	Leonardo Ghiraldini (c)	(substituted on) 72'
LP	1	Salvatore Perugini
Replacements:
HK	16	Fabio Ongaro	(substituted on) 72'
PR	17	Matías Agüero	(substituted on) 56'
LK	18	Marco Bortolami	(substituted on) 49'
FL	19	Paul Derbyshire
SH	20	Simon Picone	(substituted on) 65'
FH	21	Riccardo Bocchino	(substituted on) 65'
CE	22	Andrea Masi	(substituted on) 58'
Coach:
Nick Mallett

6 February 2010
17:00 GMT

England	30–17	Wales
Try: Haskell (2) 40' c, 75' c Care 44' c Con: Wilkinson (3/3); Pen: Wilkinson (3/3) 11', 35', 79'	Report	Try: A. Jones 49' c Hook 71' c Con: S. Jones (2/2); Pen: S. Jones (1/2) 27'

Twickenham Stadium, London
Attendance: 81,406
Referee: Alain Rolland (Ireland)

FB	15	Delon Armitage
RW	14	Mark Cueto
OC	13	Mathew Tait
IC	12	Toby Flood	(substituted off) 77'
LW	11	Ugo Monye
FH	10	Jonny Wilkinson
SH	9	Danny Care	(substituted off) 76'
N8	8	Nick Easter
OF	7	Lewis Moody	(substituted off) 76'
BF	6	James Haskell
RL	5	Steve Borthwick (c)
LL	4	Simon Shaw	(substituted off) 70'
TP	3	David Wilson	(substituted off) 60'
HK	2	Dylan Hartley	(substituted off) 60'
LP	1	Tim Payne
Replacements:
HK	16	Steve Thompson	(substituted on) 60'
PR	17	Dan Cole	(substituted on) 60'
LK	18	Louis Deacon	(substituted on) 70'
FL	19	Steffon Armitage	(substituted on) 76'
SH	20	Paul Hodgson	(substituted on) 76'
CE	21	Dan Hipkiss	(substituted on) 77'
FB	22	Ben Foden
Coach:
Martin Johnson

FB	15	Lee Byrne
RW	14	Tom James		(substituted off) 65'
OC	13	James Hook
IC	12	Jamie Roberts
LW	11	Shane Williams
FH	10	Stephen Jones
SH	9	Gareth Cooper		(substituted off) 68'
N8	8	Ryan Jones (c)
OF	7	Martyn Williams
BF	6	Andy Powell		(substituted off) 68'
RL	5	Luke Charteris		(substituted off) 54'
LL	4	Alun Wyn Jones	(yellow card) 35'
TP	3	Adam Jones
HK	2	Gareth Williams		(substituted off) 54'
LP	1	Paul James
Replacements:
HK	16	Huw Bennett		(substituted on) 54'
PR	17	Rhys Gill
LK	18	Bradley Davies		(substituted on) 54'
FL	19	Jonathan Thomas		(substituted on) 68'
SH	20	Richie Rees		(substituted on) 68'
CE	21	Andrew Bishop
WG	22	Leigh Halfpenny		(substituted on) 65'
Coach:
Warren Gatland

- England wore a special kit to celebrate the centenary of the first international match – England vs Wales – at Twickenham Stadium.
- Dan Cole (England) made his international debut.

7 February 2010
15:00 GMT

Scotland	9–18	France
Pen: Paterson (3/3) 9', 30', 52'	Report	Try: Bastareaud (2) 14' m, 33' c Con: Parra (1/2); Pen: Parra (2/3) 28', 44'

Murrayfield Stadium, Edinburgh
Attendance: 65,687
Referee: Nigel Owens (Wales)

FB	15	Chris Paterson
RW	14	Thom Evans
OC	13	Max Evans
IC	12	Graeme Morrison
LW	11	Sean Lamont
FH	10	Phil Godman	(substituted off) 51'
SH	9	Chris Cusiter (c)
N8	8	Johnnie Beattie
OF	7	John Barclay
BF	6	Kelly Brown
RL	5	Alastair Kellock
LL	4	Nathan Hines	(substituted off) 68'
TP	3	Moray Low	(substituted off) 51'	(substituted on) 70'
HK	2	Ross Ford	(substituted off) 65'
LP	1	Alasdair Dickinson		(substituted off) 70'
Replacements:
HK	16	Scott Lawson	(substituted on) 65'
PR	17	Allan Jacobsen	(substituted on) 51'
LK	18	Richie Gray	(substituted on) 68'
FL	19	Alan MacDonald
SH	20	Rory Lawson
CE	21	Alex Grove
FB	22	Hugo Southwell	(substituted on) 51'
Coach:
Andy Robinson

FB	15	Clément Poitrenaud
RW	14	Benjamin Fall
OC	13	Mathieu Bastareaud	(substituted off) 71'
IC	12	Yannick Jauzion
LW	11	Aurélien Rougerie	(substituted off) 4'
FH	10	François Trinh-Duc
SH	9	Morgan Parra	(substituted off) 71'
N8	8	Imanol Harinordoquy
OF	7	Fulgence Ouedraogo
BF	6	Thierry Dusautoir (c)	(substituted off) 66'
RL	5	Pascal Papé	(substituted off) 65'
LL	4	Lionel Nallet
TP	3	Nicolas Mas	(substituted off) 45'
HK	2	William Servat	(substituted off) 50'
LP	1	Thomas Domingo
Replacements:
HK	16	Dimitri Szarzewski	(substituted on) 50'
PR	17	Luc Ducalcon	(substituted on) 45'
LK	18	Julien Pierre	(substituted on) 65'
FL	19	Julien Bonnaire	(substituted on) 66'
SH	20	Frédéric Michalak	(substituted on) 71'
CE	21	David Marty	(substituted on) 71'
WG	22	Vincent Clerc	(substituted on) 4'
Coach:
Marc Lièvremont

- Luc Ducalcon (France) made his international debut.

=== Round 2 ===
13 February 2010
14:00 GMT

Wales	31–24	Scotland
Try: Byrne 56' m Halfpenny 77' c S. Williams 80+1' c Con: S. Jones (2/3); Pen: S. Jones (4/5) 15', 23', 39', 79'	Report	Try: Barclay 9' c M. Evans 20' m Con: Paterson (1/2); Pen: Parks (2/2) 26', 41'; Drop: Parks (2/4) 18', 66'

Millennium Stadium, Cardiff
Attendance: 74,133
Referee: George Clancy (Ireland)

FB	15	Lee Byrne
RW	14	Leigh Halfpenny
OC	13	James Hook
IC	12	Jamie Roberts
LW	11	Shane Williams
FH	10	Stephen Jones
SH	9	Gareth Cooper	(substituted off) 41'
N8	8	Ryan Jones (c)
OF	7	Martyn Williams	(substituted off) 68'
BF	6	Andy Powell	(substituted off) 49'
RL	5	Alun Wyn Jones
LL	4	Jonathan Thomas
TP	3	Adam Jones
HK	2	Gareth Williams	(substituted off) 49'
LP	1	Paul James	(substituted off) 49'
Replacements:
HK	16	Huw Bennett	(substituted on) 49'
PR	17	Gethin Jenkins	(substituted on) 49'
LK	18	Bradley Davies	(substituted on) 49'
FL	19	Sam Warburton	(substituted on) 68'
SH	20	Richie Rees	(substituted on) 41'
CE	21	Andrew Bishop
CE	22	Tom Shanklin
Coach:
Warren Gatland

FB	15	Chris Paterson		(substituted off) 30'
RW	14	Thom Evans		(substituted off) 36'
OC	13	Sean Lamont
IC	12	Graeme Morrison
LW	11	Rory Lamont		(substituted off) 73'
FH	10	Dan Parks		(substituted off) 79'
SH	9	Chris Cusiter (c)
N8	8	Johnnie Beattie
OF	7	John Barclay
BF	6	Kelly Brown
RL	5	Alastair Kellock
LL	4	Jim Hamilton		(substituted off) 78'
TP	3	Euan Murray
HK	2	Ross Ford		(substituted off) 59'
LP	1	Alasdair Dickinson		(substituted off) 57'
Replacements:
HK	16	Scott Lawson	(yellow card) 74'	(substituted on) 59'
PR	17	Allan Jacobsen		(substituted on) 57'
LK	18	Richie Gray		(substituted on) 78'
FL	19	Alan MacDonald		(substituted on) 79'
SH	20	Mike Blair		(substituted on) 36'
FH	21	Phil Godman	(yellow card) 80'	(substituted on) 73'
WG	22	Max Evans		(substituted on) 30'
Coach:
Andy Robinson

- Chris Paterson became the 13th player in history with at least 100 international appearances. His missed conversion ended a personal streak of 35 consecutive successful kicks at goal in the Six Nations, dating back to 2007.

13 February 2010
16:30 GMT

France	33–10	Ireland
Try: Servat 27' c Jauzion 31' c Poitrenaud 59' c Con: Parra (3/3); Pen: Parra (2/3) 17', 68'; Drop: Parra (1/1) 62'; Michalak (1/1) 78'	Report	Try: D. Wallace 64' c Con: O'Gara (1/1); Pen: O'Gara (1/1) 29'

Stade de France, Saint-Denis
Attendance: 79,289
Referee: Wayne Barnes (England)

FB	15	Clément Poitrenaud
RW	14	Vincent Clerc	(substituted off) 48'
OC	13	Mathieu Bastareaud
IC	12	Yannick Jauzion	(substituted off) 67'
LW	11	Alexis Palisson	(substituted off) 24'
FH	10	François Trinh-Duc
SH	9	Morgan Parra
N8	8	Imanol Harinordoquy	(substituted off) 62'
OF	7	Fulgence Ouedraogo
BF	6	Thierry Dusautoir (c)
RL	5	Pascal Papé	(substituted off) 74'
LL	4	Lionel Nallet
TP	3	Nicolas Mas	(substituted off) 49'
HK	2	William Servat	(substituted off) 49'
LP	1	Thomas Domingo
Replacements:
HK	16	Dimitri Szarzewski	(substituted on) 49'
PR	17	Sylvain Marconnet	(substituted on) 49'
LK	18	Julien Pierre	(substituted on) 74'
FL	19	Julien Bonnaire	(substituted on) 62'
SH	20	Frédéric Michalak	(substituted on) 67'
CE	21	David Marty	(substituted on) 48'
WG	22	Julien Malzieu	(substituted on) 24'
Coach:
Marc Lièvremont

FB	15	Rob Kearney		(substituted off) 35'
RW	14	Tommy Bowe
OC	13	Brian O'Driscoll (c)
IC	12	Gordon D'Arcy
LW	11	Keith Earls
FH	10	Ronan O'Gara		(substituted off) 69'
SH	9	Tomás O'Leary		(substituted off) 69'
N8	8	Jamie Heaslip
OF	7	David Wallace
BF	6	Stephen Ferris
RL	5	Paul O'Connell
LL	4	Leo Cullen		(substituted off) 61'
TP	3	John Hayes		(substituted off) 49'
HK	2	Jerry Flannery		(substituted off) 61'
LP	1	Cian Healy	(yellow card) 17'
Replacements:
HK	16	Rory Best		(substituted on) 61'
PR	17	Tom Court		(substituted on) 49'
LK	18	Donnacha Ryan		(substituted on) 61'
FL	19	Seán O'Brien
SH	20	Eoin Reddan		(substituted on) 69'
FH	21	Johnny Sexton		(substituted on) 69'
CE	22	Paddy Wallace		(substituted on) 35'
Coach:
Declan Kidney

14 February 2010
14:30 GMT

Italy	12–17	England
Pen: Mi. Bergamasco (4/5)	Report	Try: Tait 44' m Pen: Wilkinson (3/5); Drop: Wilkinson (1/1) 74'

Stadio Flaminio, Rome
Attendance: 31,876
Referee: Christophe Berdos (France)

FB	15	Luke McLean
RW	14	Andrea Masi		(substituted off) 55'
OC	13	Gonzalo Canale
IC	12	Gonzalo García
LW	11	Mirco Bergamasco
FH	10	Craig Gower
SH	9	Tito Tebaldi		(substituted off) 53'
N8	8	Alessandro Zanni
OF	7	Mauro Bergamasco
BF	6	Josh Sole
RL	5	Marco Bortolami
LL	4	Quintin Geldenhuys
TP	3	Martin Castrogiovanni	(yellow card) 58'
HK	2	Leonardo Ghiraldini (c)		(substituted off) 75'
LP	1	Salvatore Perugini		(substituted off) 55'
Replacements:
HK	16	Fabio Ongaro		(substituted on) 75'
PR	17	Matías Agüero		(substituted on) 55'
LK	18	Valerio Bernabò
FL	19	Paul Derbyshire
SH	20	Pablo Canavosio		(substituted on) 53'
FH	21	Riccardo Bocchino
WG	22	Kaine Robertson		(substituted on) 55'
Coach:
Nick Mallett

FB	15	Delon Armitage
RW	14	Mark Cueto
OC	13	Mathew Tait
IC	12	Riki Flutey
LW	11	Ugo Monye
FH	10	Jonny Wilkinson
SH	9	Danny Care	(substituted off) 75'
N8	8	Nick Easter
OF	7	Lewis Moody	(substituted off) 72'
BF	6	James Haskell
RL	5	Steve Borthwick (c)
LL	4	Simon Shaw	(substituted off) 64'
TP	3	Dan Cole	(substituted off) 64'
HK	2	Dylan Hartley	(substituted off) 69'
LP	1	Tim Payne	(substituted off) 59'
Replacements:
HK	16	Steve Thompson	(substituted on) 69'
PR	17	David Wilson	(substituted on) 64'
PR	18	Matt Mullan	(substituted on) 59'
LK	19	Louis Deacon	(substituted on) 64'
FL	20	Steffon Armitage	(substituted on) 72'
SH	21	Paul Hodgson	(substituted on) 75'
FH	22	Toby Flood
Coach:
Martin Johnson

- Jonny Wilkinson's two missed penalties ended a personal streak of consecutive successful penalty kicks in any international which he has started, dating back to 2003.
- Matt Mullan (England) made his international debut.

=== Round 3 ===
26 February 2010
20:00 GMT

Wales	20–26	France
Try: Halfpenny 62' c S. Williams 79' c Con: S. Jones (2/2); Pen: S. Jones (2/2) 45', 49'	Report	Try: Palisson 6' c Trinh-Duc 40' c Con: Parra (2/2); Pen: Parra (3/3) 19', 26', 78'; Michalak (1/1) 71'

Millennium Stadium, Cardiff
Attendance: 73,767
Referee: Jonathan Kaplan (South Africa)

FB	15	Lee Byrne
RW	14	Leigh Halfpenny
OC	13	James Hook
IC	12	Jamie Roberts
LW	11	Shane Williams
FH	10	Stephen Jones
SH	9	Richie Rees
N8	8	Ryan Jones (c)
OF	7	Martyn Williams
BF	6	Jonathan Thomas
RL	5	Deiniol Jones	(substituted off) 25'
LL	4	Bradley Davies
TP	3	Adam Jones
HK	2	Huw Bennett
LP	1	Paul James
Replacements:
HK	16	Ken Owens
PR	17	Rhys Gill
LK	18	Luke Charteris	(substituted on) 25'
FL	19	Sam Warburton
SH	20	Mike Phillips
CE	21	Andrew Bishop
CE	22	Tom Shanklin
Coach:
Warren Gatland

FB	15	Clément Poitrenaud		(substituted off) 78'
RW	14	Julien Malzieu
OC	13	Mathieu Bastareaud		(substituted off) 69'
IC	12	Yannick Jauzion
LW	11	Alexis Palisson
FH	10	François Trinh-Duc		(substituted off) 65'
SH	9	Morgan Parra	(yellow card) 64'
N8	8	Imanol Harinordoquy		(substituted off) 69'
OF	7	Julien Bonnaire
BF	6	Thierry Dusautoir (c)
RL	5	Julien Pierre		(substituted off) 64'
LL	4	Lionel Nallet
TP	3	Nicolas Mas
HK	2	William Servat		(substituted off) 52'	(substituted on) 68'	(substituted off) 70'
LP	1	Thomas Domingo		(substituted off) 54'
Replacements:
HK	16	Dimitri Szarzewski		(substituted on) 52'	(substituted off) 68'	(substituted on) 70'
PR	17	Jean-Baptiste Poux		(substituted on) 54'
LK	18	Sébastien Chabal		(substituted on) 64'
FL	19	Alexandre Lapandry		(substituted on) 69'
FH	20	Frédéric Michalak		(substituted on) 65'
CE	21	David Marty		(substituted on) 69'
WG	22	Marc Andreu		(substituted on) 78'
Coach:
Marc Lièvremont

Notes:

- Marc Andreu (France) made his international debut.

27 February 2010
13:30 GMT

Italy	16–12	Scotland
Try: Canavosio 64' c Con: Mi. Bergamasco (1/1); Pen: Mi. Bergamasco (3/3) 10', 14', 43'	Report	Pen: Parks (3/4) 22', 33', 64'; Drop: Parks 49'

Stadio Flaminio, Rome
Attendance: 32,000
Referee: Dave Pearson (England)

FB	15	Luke McLean
RW	14	Andrea Masi
OC	13	Gonzalo Canale
IC	12	Gonzalo García	(substituted off) 69'
LW	11	Mirco Bergamasco
FH	10	Craig Gower
SH	9	Tito Tebaldi	(substituted off) 52'
N8	8	Alessandro Zanni
OF	7	Mauro Bergamasco
BF	6	Josh Sole
RL	5	Marco Bortolami	(substituted off) 69'
LL	4	Quintin Geldenhuys
TP	3	Martin Castrogiovanni
HK	2	Leonardo Ghiraldini (c)	(substituted off) 73'
LP	1	Salvatore Perugini	(substituted off) 69'
Replacements:
HK	16	Fabio Ongaro	(substituted on) 73'
PR	17	Matías Agüero	(substituted on) 69'
LK	18	Carlo Del Fava	(substituted on) 69'
FL	19	Paul Derbyshire
SH	20	Pablo Canavosio	(substituted on) 52'
FH	21	Riccardo Bocchino
WG	22	Kaine Robertson	(substituted on) 69'
Coach:
Nick Mallett

FB	15	Hugo Southwell
RW	14	Simon Danielli	(substituted off) 55'
OC	13	Max Evans
IC	12	Graeme Morrison
LW	11	Sean Lamont
FH	10	Dan Parks	(substituted off) 79'
SH	9	Chris Cusiter (c)	(substituted off) 55'
N8	8	Johnnie Beattie	(substituted off) 55'
OF	7	John Barclay
BF	6	Kelly Brown
RL	5	Alastair Kellock
LL	4	Jim Hamilton	(substituted off) 70'
TP	3	Euan Murray	(substituted off) 70'
HK	2	Ross Ford
LP	1	Allan Jacobsen
Replacements:
HK	16	Scott Lawson
PR	17	Alasdair Dickinson	(substituted on) 70'
LK	18	Nathan Hines	(substituted on) 70'
FL	19	Alasdair Strokosch	(substituted on) 55'
SH	20	Mike Blair	(substituted on) 55'
FH	21	Phil Godman
CE	22	Nick De Luca	(substituted on) 55'
Coach:
Andy Robinson

27 February 2010
16:00 GMT

England	16–20	Ireland
Try: Cole 61' c Con: Wilkinson (1/1); Pen: Wilkinson (2/5) 15', 36'; Drop: Wilkinson (1/3) 70'	Report	Try: Bowe (2) 4' m, 75' c Earls 56' m Con: O'Gara (1/1); Pen: Sexton (1/3) 29'

Twickenham Stadium, London
Attendance: 81,554
Referee: Mark Lawrence (South Africa)

FB	15	Delon Armitage	(substituted off) 49'
RW	14	Mark Cueto
OC	13	Mathew Tait
IC	12	Riki Flutey
LW	11	Ugo Monye
FH	10	Jonny Wilkinson
SH	9	Danny Care	(substituted off) 73'
N8	8	Nick Easter
OF	7	Lewis Moody	(substituted off) 55'
BF	6	James Haskell
RL	5	Steve Borthwick (c)
LL	4	Simon Shaw	(substituted off) 4'
TP	3	Dan Cole	(substituted off) 73'
HK	2	Dylan Hartley	(substituted off) 64'
LP	1	Tim Payne
Replacements:
HK	16	Lee Mears	(substituted on) 64'
PR	17	David Wilson	(substituted on) 73'
LK	18	Louis Deacon	(substituted on) 4'
FL	19	Joe Worsley	(substituted on) 55'
SH	20	Paul Hodgson	(substituted on) 73'
FH	21	Toby Flood
FB	22	Ben Foden	(substituted on) 49'
Coach:
Martin Johnson

FB	15	Geordan Murphy
RW	14	Tommy Bowe
OC	13	Brian O'Driscoll (c)	(substituted off) 64'
IC	12	Gordon D'Arcy
LW	11	Keith Earls
FH	10	Johnny Sexton	(substituted off) 69'
SH	9	Tomás O'Leary
N8	8	Jamie Heaslip
OF	7	David Wallace	(substituted off) 70'
BF	6	Stephen Ferris
RL	5	Paul O'Connell
LL	4	Donncha O'Callaghan	(substituted off) 69'
TP	3	John Hayes	(substituted off) 63'
HK	2	Rory Best
LP	1	Cian Healy
Replacements:
HK	16	Seán Cronin
PR	17	Tony Buckley	(substituted on) 63'
LK	18	Leo Cullen	(substituted on) 69'
FL	19	Shane Jennings	(substituted on) 70'
SH	20	Eoin Reddan
FH	21	Ronan O'Gara	(substituted on) 69'
CE	22	Andrew Trimble	(substituted on) 64'
Coach:
Declan Kidney

- John Hayes became the first Irish player to earn 100 international caps.

=== Round 4 ===
13 March 2010
14:30 GMT

Ireland	27–12	Wales
Try: Earls (2) 27' m, 60' m O'Leary 31' m Pen: Sexton (3/4) 16', 21', 50'; Drop: Sexton (1/1) 76'	Report	Pen: S. Jones (4/5) 9', 38', 54', 63'

Croke Park, Dublin
Attendance: 81,340
Referee: Craig Joubert (South Africa)

FB	15	Geordan Murphy
RW	14	Tommy Bowe
OC	13	Brian O'Driscoll (c)
IC	12	Gordon D'Arcy	(substituted off) 23'
LW	11	Keith Earls	(substituted off) 77'
FH	10	Johnny Sexton
SH	9	Tomás O'Leary	(substituted off) 78'
N8	8	Jamie Heaslip
OF	7	David Wallace
BF	6	Stephen Ferris	(substituted off) 78'
RL	5	Paul O'Connell	(substituted off) 79'
LL	4	Donncha O'Callaghan
TP	3	John Hayes	(substituted off) 73'
HK	2	Rory Best	(substituted off) 79'
LP	1	Cian Healy
Replacements:
HK	16	Seán Cronin	(substituted on) 79'
PR	17	Tony Buckley	(substituted on) 73'
LK	18	Leo Cullen	(substituted on) 79'
FL	19	Shane Jennings	(substituted on) 78'
SH	20	Eoin Reddan	(substituted on) 78'
FH	21	Ronan O'Gara	(substituted on) 77'
FB	22	Rob Kearney	(substituted on) 23'
Coach:
Declan Kidney

FB	15	Lee Byrne	(substituted off) 63'
RW	14	Leigh Halfpenny
OC	13	James Hook
IC	12	Jamie Roberts
LW	11	Shane Williams
FH	10	Stephen Jones
SH	9	Richie Rees	(substituted off) 61'
N8	8	Gareth Delve
OF	7	Martyn Williams (c)	(substituted off) 66'
BF	6	Jonathan Thomas
RL	5	Luke Charteris
LL	4	Bradley Davies	(substituted off) 58'
TP	3	Adam Jones
HK	2	Matthew Rees	(substituted off) 56'
LP	1	Paul James	(substituted off) 77'
Replacements:
HK	16	Huw Bennett	(substituted on) 56'
PR	17	Rhys Gill	(substituted on) 77'
LK	18	Ian Gough	(substituted on) 58'
FL	19	Sam Warburton	(substituted on) 66'
SH	20	Dwayne Peel	(substituted on) 61'
CE	21	Andrew Bishop	(substituted on) 63'
CE	22	Tom Shanklin
Coach:
Warren Gatland

- Brian O'Driscoll became the second Irishman to reach 100 caps for his country.

13 March 2010
17:00 GMT

Scotland	15–15	England
Pen: Parks (4/6) 6', 18', 50', 68'; Drop: Parks (1/3) 39'	Report	Pen: Wilkinson (3/3) 14', 30', 41'; Flood (2/4) 49', 64'

Murrayfield Stadium, Edinburgh
Attendance: 66,891
Referee: Marius Jonker (South Africa)

FB	15	Hugo Southwell	(substituted off) 69'
RW	14	Sean Lamont
OC	13	Nick De Luca
IC	12	Graeme Morrison
LW	11	Max Evans
FH	10	Dan Parks	(substituted off) 71'
SH	9	Chris Cusiter (c)	(substituted off) 60'
N8	8	Johnnie Beattie
OF	7	John Barclay
BF	6	Kelly Brown	(substituted off) 55'
RL	5	Alastair Kellock
LL	4	Jim Hamilton	(substituted off) 51'
TP	3	Euan Murray
HK	2	Ross Ford	(substituted off) 65'
LP	1	Allan Jacobsen	(substituted off) 71'
Replacements:
HK	16	Scott Lawson	(substituted on) 65'
PR	17	Geoff Cross	(substituted on) 71'
LK	18	Nathan Hines	(substituted on) 51'
FL	19	Alan MacDonald	(substituted on) 55'
SH	20	Rory Lawson	(substituted on) 60'
FH	21	Phil Godman	(substituted on) 71'
WG	22	Simon Danielli	(substituted on) 69'
Coach:
Andy Robinson

FB	15	Delon Armitage	(substituted off) 50'
RW	14	Mark Cueto
OC	13	Mathew Tait
IC	12	Riki Flutey
LW	11	Ugo Monye	(substituted off) 55'
FH	10	Jonny Wilkinson	(substituted off) 44'
SH	9	Danny Care
N8	8	Nick Easter
OF	7	Joe Worsley
BF	6	James Haskell	(substituted off) 61'
RL	5	Steve Borthwick (c)
LL	4	Louis Deacon	(substituted off) 73'
TP	3	Dan Cole	(substituted off) 77'
HK	2	Dylan Hartley	(substituted off) 61'
LP	1	Tim Payne
Replacements:
HK	16	Steve Thompson	(substituted on) 61'
PR	17	David Wilson	(substituted on) 77'
LK	18	Courtney Lawes	(substituted on) 73'
FL	19	Lewis Moody	(substituted on) 61'
SH	20	Ben Youngs	(substituted on) 55'
FH	21	Toby Flood	(substituted on) 44'
FB	22	Ben Foden	(substituted on) 50'
Coach:
Martin Johnson

- Ben Youngs (England) made his international debut.

14 March 2010
14:30 GMT

France	46–20	Italy
Try: Harinordoquy 5' c Marty (2) 17' c, 25' m Andreu 51' c Jauzion 56' c Lapandry 65' c Con: Parra (5/6); Pen: Parra (2/3) 10', 41'	Report	Try: Del Fava 68' c Canavosio 72' c Con: Mi. Bergamasco (2/2); Pen: Mi. Bergamasco (2/2) 35', 44'

Stade de France, Saint-Denis
Attendance: 78,712
Referee: Alan Lewis (Ireland)

FB	15	Clément Poitrenaud	(substituted off) 64'
RW	14	Marc Andreu
OC	13	David Marty
IC	12	Yannick Jauzion	(substituted off) 69'
LW	11	Alexis Palisson
FH	10	François Trinh-Duc	(substituted off) 58'
SH	9	Morgan Parra
N8	8	Imanol Harinordoquy
OF	7	Julien Bonnaire
BF	6	Thierry Dusautoir (c)	(substituted off) 58'
RL	5	Julien Pierre
LL	4	Lionel Nallet	(substituted off) 48'
TP	3	Nicolas Mas	(substituted off) 40'
HK	2	William Servat	(substituted off) 40'
LP	1	Thomas Domingo
Replacements:
HK	16	Dimitri Szarzewski	(substituted on) 40'
PR	17	Jean-Baptiste Poux	(substituted on) 40'
LK	18	Sébastien Chabal	(substituted on) 48'
FL	19	Alexandre Lapandry	(substituted on) 58'
SH	20	Dimitri Yachvili	(substituted on) 58'
CE	21	Mathieu Bastareaud	(substituted on) 69'
WG	22	Julien Malzieu	(substituted on) 64'
Coach:
Marc Lièvremont

FB	15	Luke McLean
RW	14	Andrea Masi
OC	13	Gonzalo Canale
IC	12	Gonzalo García	(yellow card) 15'
LW	11	Mirco Bergamasco
FH	10	Craig Gower		(substituted off) 76'
SH	9	Tito Tebaldi		(substituted off) 30'
N8	8	Alessandro Zanni
OF	7	Mauro Bergamasco
BF	6	Josh Sole
RL	5	Marco Bortolami		(substituted off) 55'
LL	4	Quintin Geldenhuys
TP	3	Martin Castrogiovanni		(substituted off) 66'
HK	2	Leonardo Ghiraldini (c)		(substituted off) 66'
LP	1	Salvatore Perugini
Replacements:
HK	16	Fabio Ongaro		(substituted on) 66'
PR	17	Matías Agüero		(substituted on) 66'
LK	18	Carlo Del Fava		(substituted on) 55'
FL	19	Paul Derbyshire
SH	20	Pablo Canavosio		(substituted on) 30'
FH	21	Riccardo Bocchino		(substituted on) 76'
WG	22	Kaine Robertson
Coach:
Nick Mallett

=== Round 5 ===
20 March 2010
14:30 GMT

Wales	33–10	Italy
Try: Hook (2) 52' c, 57' c S. Williams 68' c Con: S. Jones (3/3); Pen: S. Jones (4/4) 8', 22', 33', 36'	Report	Try: McLean 75' c Con: Mi. Bergamasco (1/1) 75'; Pen: Mi. Bergamasco (1/2) 65'

Millennium Stadium, Cardiff
Attendance: 70,548
Referee: Wayne Barnes (England)

FB	15	Lee Byrne
RW	14	Tom Prydie
OC	13	James Hook
IC	12	Jamie Roberts	(substituted off) 63'
LW	11	Shane Williams
FH	10	Stephen Jones	(substituted off) 70'
SH	9	Mike Phillips	(substituted off) 70'
N8	8	Ryan Jones (c)	(substituted off) 67'
OF	7	Sam Warburton
BF	6	Jonathan Thomas
RL	5	Luke Charteris
LL	4	Bradley Davies	(substituted off) 15'
TP	3	Adam Jones	(substituted off) 63'
HK	2	Matthew Rees	(substituted off) 63'
LP	1	Gethin Jenkins
Replacements:
HK	16	Huw Bennett	(substituted on) 63'
PR	17	Paul James	(substituted on) 63'
LK	18	Ian Gough	(substituted on) 15'
N8	19	Gareth Delve	(substituted on) 67'
SH	20	Dwayne Peel	(substituted on) 70'
CE	21	Andrew Bishop	(substituted on) 70'
CE	22	Tom Shanklin	(substituted on) 63'
Coach:
Warren Gatland

FB	15	Luke McLean
RW	14	Kaine Robertson
OC	13	Gonzalo Canale		(substituted off) 4'
IC	12	Gonzalo García
LW	11	Mirco Bergamasco
FH	10	Craig Gower
SH	9	Pablo Canavosio		(substituted off) 25'
N8	8	Alessandro Zanni
OF	7	Mauro Bergamasco	(yellow card) 56'
BF	6	Josh Sole		(substituted off) 55'
RL	5	Marco Bortolami		(substituted off) 73'
LL	4	Quintin Geldenhuys
TP	3	Martín Castrogiovanni
HK	2	Leonardo Ghiraldini (c)		(substituted off) 65'
LP	1	Salvatore Perugini		(substituted off) 55'
Replacements:
HK	16	Fabio Ongaro		(substituted on) 65'
PR	17	Matías Agüero		(substituted on) 55'
LK	18	Valerio Bernabò		(substituted on) 73'
N8	19	Manoa Vosawai		(substituted on) 55'
SH	20	Tito Tebaldi		(substituted on) 25'	(substituted off) 63'
FH	21	Riccardo Bocchino			(substituted on) 63'
CE	22	Matteo Pratichetti		(substituted on) 4'
Coach:
Nick Mallett

- Tom Prydie became the youngest test cap in Welsh rugby history, at the age of 18 years, 25 days.

20 March 2010
17:00 GMT

Ireland	20–23	Scotland
Try: O'Driscoll 11' c Bowe 64' c Con: Sexton (1/1); O'Gara (1/1); Pen: Sexton (1/3) 51'; O'Gara (1/1) 76'	Report	Try: Beattie 15' m Pen: Parks (5/6) 5', 37', 46', 73', 78'; Drop: Parks (1/2) 40+1'

Croke Park, Dublin
Attendance: 80,313
Referee: Jonathan Kaplan (South Africa)

FB	15	Geordan Murphy	(substituted off) 26'
RW	14	Tommy Bowe
OC	13	Brian O'Driscoll (c)
IC	12	Gordon D'Arcy
LW	11	Keith Earls
FH	10	Johnny Sexton	(substituted off) 52'
SH	9	Tomás O'Leary
N8	8	Jamie Heaslip
OF	7	David Wallace
BF	6	Stephen Ferris
RL	5	Paul O'Connell
LL	4	Donncha O'Callaghan
TP	3	John Hayes	(substituted off) 80'
HK	2	Rory Best
LP	1	Cian Healy
Replacements:
HK	16	Seán Cronin
PR	17	Tony Buckley	(substituted on) 80'
LK	18	Leo Cullen
FL	19	Shane Jennings
SH	20	Eoin Reddan
FH	21	Ronan O'Gara	(substituted on) 52'
FB	22	Rob Kearney	(substituted on) 26'
Coach:
Declan Kidney

FB	15	Hugo Southwell
RW	14	Sean Lamont	(substituted off) 73'
OC	13	Nick De Luca
IC	12	Graeme Morrison
LW	11	Max Evans
FH	10	Dan Parks
SH	9	Chris Cusiter (c)	(substituted off) 52'
N8	8	Johnnie Beattie
OF	7	John Barclay
BF	6	Kelly Brown
RL	5	Alastair Kellock
LL	4	Jim Hamilton	(substituted off) 52'
TP	3	Euan Murray
HK	2	Ross Ford	(substituted off) 72'
LP	1	Allan Jacobsen	(substituted off) 67'
Replacements:
HK	16	Scott Lawson	(substituted on) 72'
PR	17	Alasdair Dickinson	(substituted on) 67'
LK	18	Richie Gray	(substituted on) 52'
FL	19	Alan MacDonald
SH	20	Mike Blair	(substituted on) 52'
FH	21	Phil Godman
WG	22	Simon Danielli	(substituted on) 73'
Coach:
Andy Robinson

20 March 2010
19:45 GMT

France	12–10	England
Pen: Parra (3/4) 19', 25', 35'; Drop: Trinh-Duc (1/1) 3'	Report	Try: Foden 6' c Con: Flood (1/1); Pen: Wilkinson (1/1) 67'

Stade de France, Saint-Denis
Attendance: 80,066
Referee: Bryce Lawrence (New Zealand)

FB	15	Clément Poitrenaud
RW	14	Marc Andreu	(substituted off) 73'
OC	13	Mathieu Bastareaud	(substituted off) 51'
IC	12	Yannick Jauzion
LW	11	Alexis Palisson
FH	10	François Trinh-Duc
SH	9	Morgan Parra
N8	8	Imanol Harinordoquy	(substituted off) 53'
OF	7	Julien Bonnaire
BF	6	Thierry Dusautoir (c)
RL	5	Julien Pierre	(substituted off) 59'
LL	4	Lionel Nallet
TP	3	Nicolas Mas
HK	2	William Servat	(substituted off) 53'
LP	1	Thomas Domingo	(substituted off) 55'
Replacements:
HK	16	Dimitri Szarzewski	(substituted on) 53'
PR	17	Jean-Baptiste Poux	(substituted on) 55'
LK	18	Sébastien Chabal	(substituted on) 59'
FL	19	Alexandre Lapandry	(substituted on) 53'
SH	20	Dimitri Yachvili
CE	21	David Marty	(substituted on) 51'
WG	22	Julien Malzieu	(substituted on) 73'
Coach:
Marc Lièvremont

FB	15	Ben Foden
RW	14	Mark Cueto
OC	13	Mike Tindall	(substituted off) 53'
IC	12	Riki Flutey	(substituted off) 61'
LW	11	Chris Ashton
FH	10	Toby Flood
SH	9	Danny Care
N8	8	Nick Easter
OF	7	Lewis Moody (c)
BF	6	Joe Worsley	(substituted off) 64'
RL	5	Louis Deacon
LL	4	Simon Shaw	(substituted off) 15'
TP	3	Dan Cole	(substituted off) 41'
HK	2	Dylan Hartley	(substituted off) 41'
LP	1	Tim Payne
Replacements:
HK	16	Steve Thompson	(substituted on) 41'
PR	17	David Wilson	(substituted on) 41'
LK	18	Tom Palmer	(substituted on) 15'
FL	19	James Haskell	(substituted on) 64'
SH	20	Ben Youngs
FH	21	Jonny Wilkinson	(substituted on) 61'
CE	22	Mathew Tait	(substituted on) 53'
Coach:
Martin Johnson

- Chris Ashton (England) made his international debut.

== Top scorers ==
=== Try scorers ===
Tries	Name	Pld	Team
3	Keith Earls	5	Ireland
3	Tommy Bowe	5	Ireland
3	James Hook	5	Wales
3	Shane Williams	5	Wales
2	James Haskell	5	England
2	Mathieu Bastareaud	5	France
2	Yannick Jauzion	5	France
2	David Marty	5	France
2	Pablo Canavosio	4	Italy
2	Leigh Halfpenny	4	Wales
2	Tomás O'Leary	5	Ireland

=== Points scorers ===
Points	Name	Pld	Team
63	Stephen Jones	5	Wales
61	Morgan Parra	5	France
57	Dan Parks	4	Scotland
50	Jonny Wilkinson	5	England
41	Mirco Bergamasco	5	Italy
28	Ronan O'Gara	5	Ireland
20	Johnny Sexton	4	Ireland
15	Keith Earls	5	Ireland
15	Tommy Bowe	5	Ireland
15	Shane Williams	5	Wales
15	James Hook	5	Wales
