= Riccardo Bocchino =

Italian rugby union player

- Born: 3 March 1988 (age 38) Viterbo, Italy
- Height: 1.81 m (5 ft 11 1/2 in)
- Weight: 83 kg (183 lb)

Rugby union career
- Position: Fly-half
- Current team: Rugby Club I Cavalieri Prato
Senior career
Years	Team	Apps	(Points)
2007–2009	Capitolina	17	(0)
2009–2010	Rovigo	16	(0)
2010–2011	Aironi	14	(19)
2011−2012	Rugby Club I Cavalieri Prato	24	(49)
2012−2014	Capitolina Roma	16	(50)
International career
Years	Team	Apps	(Points)
2008–2011	Italy A	6	(47)
2010–2011	Italy	14	(29)
- Correct as of 10 September 2010
National sevens team
Years	Team		Comps
2014−2015	Italy Sevens		16 (13)

Riccardo Bocchino (born 3 March 1988) is an Italian rugby union player. Bocchino, who is a fly-half, plays his club rugby for Aironi. He made his debut for Italy against Ireland on 6 February 2010.

Bocchino began his career at Capitolina, with whom he made his debut during the 2007–08 season. He played for the Italian under-20 team at the 2008 IRB Junior World Championship and Italy A at the 2009 IRB Nations Cup. Bocchino moved to Rovigo prior to the 2009–10 season. He was named in Nick Mallett's squad for the 2010 Six Nations Championship, making his debut against Ireland.

Bocchino joined Aironi in 2010 prior to their first season in the Celtic League.
