= Tito Tebaldi =

Italian rugby union player (born 1987)

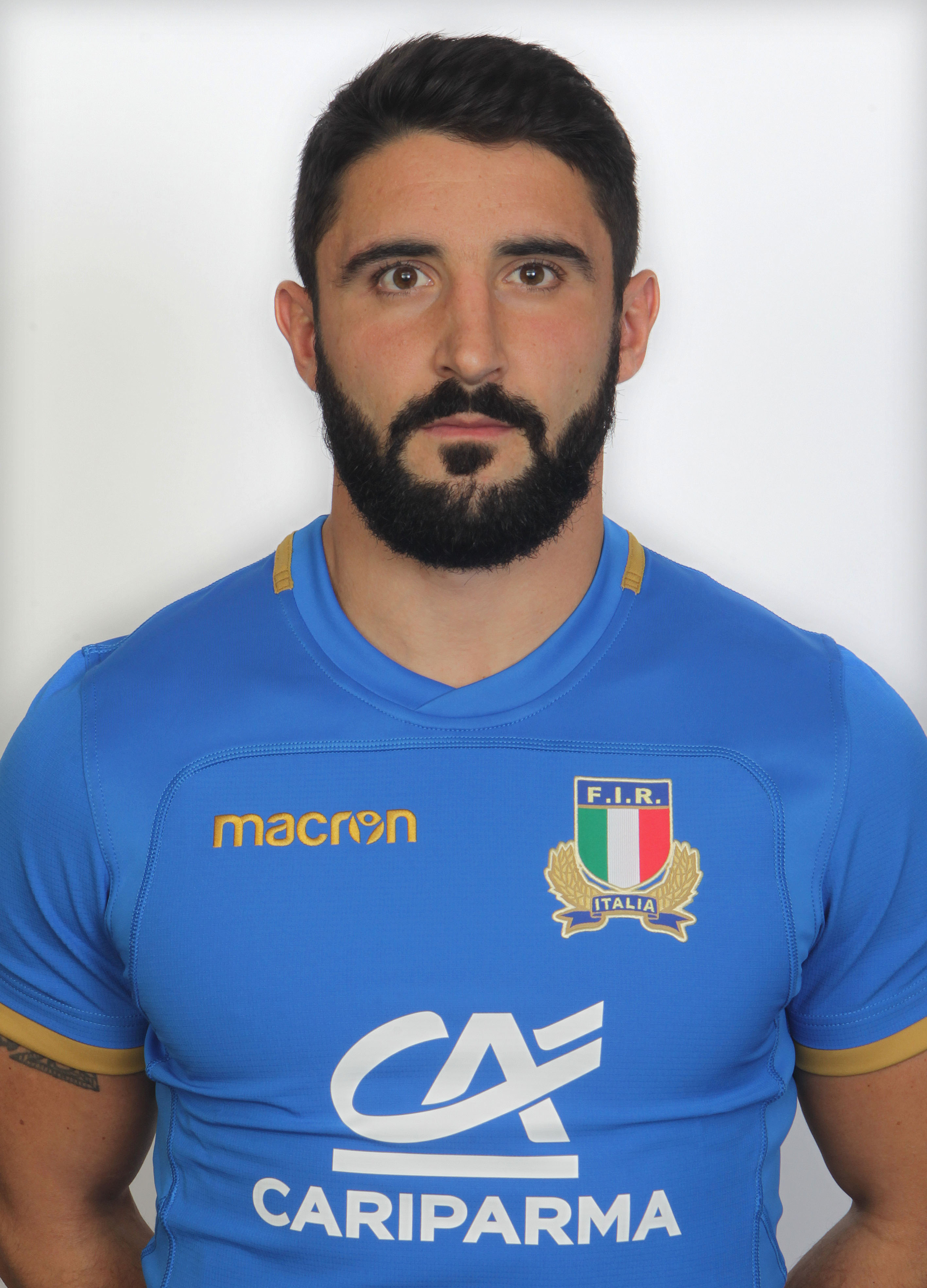
- Tebaldi in 2017
- Born: Tito Tebaldi; 20 September 1987 (age 39) Parma, Italy
- Height: 180 cm (5 ft 11 in)
- Weight: 87 kg (13 st 10 lb; 192 lb)
- Notable relative: Daniele Tebaldi (uncle)

Rugby union career
- Position: Scrum-half
Amateur team(s)
| Years | Team | Apps | (Points) |
- Noceto
Senior career
| Years | Team | Apps | (Points) |
| 2006–2010 | Gran Parma | 55 | (162) |
| 2010–2012 | Aironi | 47 | (93) |
| 2012–2013 | Zebre | 21 | (22) |
| 2013–2014 | Ospreys | 18 | (5) |
| 2014–2016 | Harlequins | 10 | (0) |
| 2016–2020 | Benetton | 64 | (54) |
| 2020–2025 | Petrarca Padova | | |
- Correct as of 29 April 2017
International career
| Years | Team | Apps | (Points) |
| 2011 | Emerging Italy | 3 | (35) |
| 2009–2019 | Italy | 36 | (13) |
- Correct as of 4 Oct 2019
National sevens team
| Years | Team | | Comps |
| 2023 | Italy Sevens | | 2 |

Tito Tebaldi (Italian pronunciation: [ˈtiːto teˈbaldi]; born 20 September 1987) is an Italian former rugby union player. He played as scrum-half. He made his debut for Italy against Australia on 13 June 2009.

== Career ==
Tebaldi is the nephew of former Italy fullback Daniele Tebaldi, began his career playing for Noceto, a team based in the Province of Parma. He joined Gran Parma of the Super 10 in 2006, making his debut at 19. After establishing himself as a regular starter during the 2008–09 season, Tebaldi quickly earned a reputation as one of the best young players in Italy. Tebaldi joined Aironi in May 2010 for their debut season in the Celtic League.

Nick Mallett included Tebaldi in the Italy squad for the 2009 mid-year rugby test series after Simon Picone pulled out for personal reasons. Having made his debut as a replacement for Pablo Canavosio in the first test, Tebaldi was the starting scrum-half for Italy's final two games of the tour. Tebaldi played in all three of Italy's end of year tests and established himself as the first choice scrum half for the 2010 Six Nations Championship.

On 2 March 2013, he signed with Ospreys where he played 18 games with one score.

It was announced on 3 December 2014 that he was joining Harlequins from Ospreys.

On 17 May 2016, Benetton Treviso announced the player as new scrum-half from the 2016–2017 season. He played for Benetton until 2019–20 Pro14 season for to move to Petrarca Padova. In 2020, he signed for Petrarca Padova in Italian Serie A Elite.

On 18 August 2019, he was named in the final 31-man squad for the 2019 Rugby World Cup.

In June 2023, he was named in Italy Sevens squad for the 2023 Rugby Europe Sevens Championship Series.
