= Tomás O'Leary =

Irish rugby union player (born 1983)

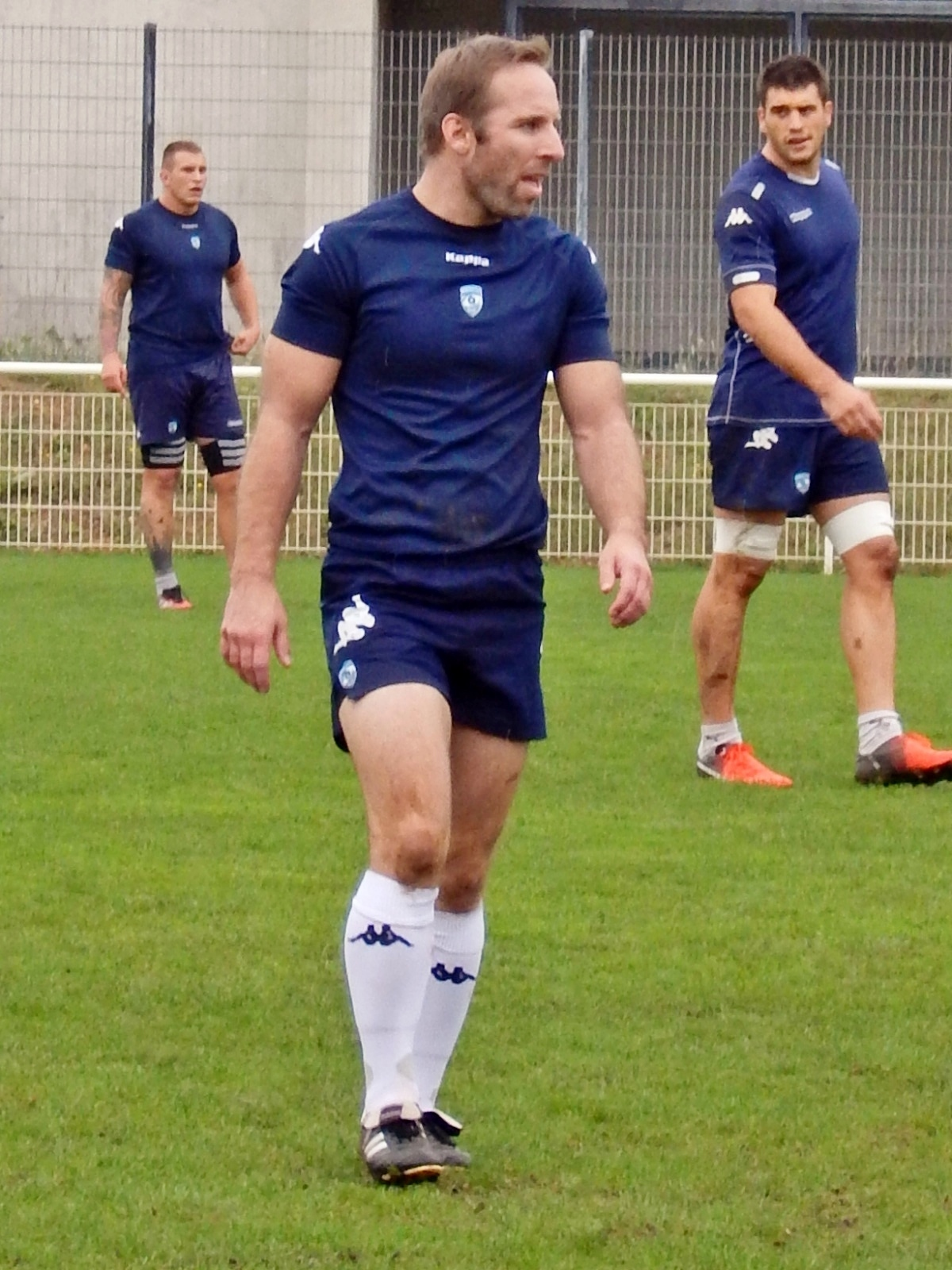
- Born: 22 October 1983 (age 43) Cork, Ireland
- Height: 1.80 m (5 ft 11 in)
- Weight: 85 kg (13.4 st; 187 lb)
- School: Christian Brothers College
- University: University College Cork

Rugby union career
- Position: Scrum-half
Amateur team(s)
Years	Team	Apps	(Points)
- Dolphin
Senior career
Years	Team	Apps	(Points)
2005–2012	Munster	127	(57)
2012–2015	London Irish	42	(5)
2015–2016	Munster	18	(0)
2016–2017	Montpellier	6	(0)
- Correct as of 28 January 2017
International career
Years	Team	Apps	(Points)
2006–2012	Ireland Wolfhounds	9	(5)
2007–2012	Ireland	24	(15)
2009	British & Irish Lions	0	(0)
- Correct as of 18 March 2012

Tomás O'Leary (born 22 October 1983) is an Irish former rugby union player who played as a scrum-half. O'Leary played most of his career in the United Rugby Championship with Munster, where he was part of the team that won the Heineken Cup in 2006 and again in 2008. He also played in the English Premiership with London Irish, and the Top 14 with Montpellier. Internationally, he represented Ireland, where he was a member of the team that won the 2009 Six Nations Championship and Grand Slam. Also in 2009, he was selected for the British & Irish Lions, though injury prevented him from touring with the squad. O'Leary retired from professional rugby in July 2017.

== Early years ==
O'Leary was born in Cork, Ireland. The son of Cork hurler, Seánie O'Leary, O'Leary attended Saint Patrick's School on Gardiner's Hill before going to Christian Brothers College (CBC) for his second-level education. CBC has a rugby tradition and this is where O'Leary first started playing. He was recognised as a talent and played Munster Schools Senior Cup for the school.

During this time, he continued to play hurling and won Munster Minor Championship and All-Ireland Minor Championship titles with Cork in 2000 and 2001.

== Club career ==
=== Munster ===
After he completed school, O'Leary continued with his rugby career instead of playing within the Gaelic Athletic Association. He was a member of the Irish U-21 side that reached the final of the 2004 Under 21 Rugby World Cup. Munster announced that O'Leary would be a member of the squad for the following year in August 2005. An injury to Peter Stringer early in the 2005/2006 season meant O'Leary had a chance to play, making his Heineken Cup debut against Sale Sharks in October 2005. He played his club rugby in Ireland with a Munster club, Dolphin. O'Leary played a prominent role in Munster's Heineken Cup winning campaigns in 2005/06 and 2007/08, especially in the knockout stages of the 2007–08 tournament.

=== London Irish ===
It was reported that O'Leary had signed for USA Perpignan on 17 February 2012, but a spokesman for O'Leary said the player hadn't signed anything yet and would be making a decision shortly. It emerged that the deal with Perpignan collapsed and, having rejected a deal from Munster, O'Leary was in a state of limbo. However, Aviva Premiership side London Irish stepped in to secure O'Leary's services on a three-year contract, with O'Leary joining the English side for the start of the 2012–13 season. O'Leary made his full debut for London Irish on 1 September 2012, in their opening league fixture against Saracens.

O'Leary was ruled out of the rest of the 2012–13 season, after having surgery on a back injury in December 2012 which kept him out for the rest of the season. O'Leary returned from the injury at the beginning of the 2013–14 season.

=== Return to Munster ===
On 21 January 2015, it was announced that O'Leary would return to Munster on a two-year contract. O'Leary made his first appearance of his second spell with Munster on 17 October 2015, coming off the bench during the 35–17 win against Cardiff Blues. O'Leary came off the bench in Munster's opening pool game of the 2015–16 European Rugby Champions Cup against Treviso on 14 November 2015. On 24 January 2017, it was announced that O'Leary would not be returning to Munster after the completion of his short-term contract with Montpellier.

=== Montpellier ===
In October 2016, O'Leary joined French Top 14 side Montpellier Hérault Rugby as a medical joker replacement for the injured Benoît Paillaugue. He played finished his last professional season with Montpellier and retired in mid-2017.

== Ireland ==
O'Leary was named in the Irish squad to tour Argentina in the summer of 2007 where he earned his first cap as a sub on 26 May. He made his first test start for Ireland on 15 November 2008 against New Zealand.

O'Leary was a member of the victorious Ireland team that won the 2009 Six Nations Championship and Grand Slam, starting four of Ireland's five matches in that tournament. O'Leary scored his first try for Ireland in the 29–11 2010 Six Nations Championship opener against Italy. O'Leary was awarded Man of the Match for his outstanding performance during Ireland's 27–12 win over Wales at Croke Park on 13 March 2010. He broke his thumb against Leinster in October 2010 and was ruled out for 6–8 weeks. O'Leary recovered to fitness and featured against Italy and France during the 2011 Six Nations, but a troublesome back and a freak eye injury sustained during training ruled him out of the remainder of the tournament. Injury and the form of Conor Murray kept him out of the Munster team for the rest of the 2010/11 season, but O'Leary was selected in Ireland's training squad for the 2011 Rugby World Cup warm-ups in August. However, O'Leary did not make the final 30-man squad for the World Cup in New Zealand.

O'Leary was named in the Ireland Wolfhounds squad for their games against Scotland A and England Saxons in January and February 2012, missing out on selection for the 24-man squad for the 2012 Six Nations Championship. However, a knee injury suffered by Conor Murray meant that O'Leary was called into the Ireland squad for the remaining 2012 Six Nations games against Scotland and England. He received his last international cap in a game against England at Twickenham in March 2012.

== British & Irish Lions ==
O'Leary was named to take part in the 2009 British & Irish Lions tour to South Africa. However, during a Munster match against Scarlets on 24 April 2009, O'Leary broke his ankle, which ruled him out of the tour of South Africa.

== Statistics ==
=== International analysis by opposition ===
Against	Played	Won	Lost	Drawn	Tries	Points	% Won
Argentina	2	1	1	0	0	0	50
Australia	2	0	1	1	0	0	0
England	3	2	1	0	0	0	66.67
Fiji	1	1	0	0	0	0	100
France	4	1	3	0	1	5	25
Italy	3	3	0	0	1	5	100
New Zealand	2	0	2	0	0	0	0
Scotland	4	2	2	0	0	0	50
South Africa	1	1	0	0	0	0	100
Wales	2	2	0	0	1	5	100
Total	24	13	10	1	3	15	54.17

Correct as of 5 July 2017

== See also ==
- List of players who have converted from one football code to another
