= Matías Agüero =

Italy international rugby union player (born 1981)

- Born: Matías Agüero; 13 February 1981 (age 45) San Nicolás, Argentina
- Height: 1.85 m (6 ft 1 in)
- Weight: 108 kg (17 st 0 lb; 238 lb)

Rugby union career
- Position: Loosehead Prop
- Current team: Leicester Tigers
Amateur team(s)
Years	Team	Apps	(Points)
2001–02	Regatas San Nicolas		
Senior career
Years	Team	Apps	(Points)
2002–2004	Rovigo		
2004–2007	Viadana	25	(10)
2007–2010	Saracens	46	(16)
2010–2012	Aironi	28	(0)
2012–2015	Zebre	52	(0)
2015–2016	Leicester Tigers	7	(0)
2016−2018	Provence	24	(15)
- Correct as of 28 August 2015
International career
Years	Team	Apps	(Points)
2011	Italy A	3	(0)
2005–2015	Italy	39	(5)
- Correct as of 11 October 2015

Matías Agüero (born 13 February 1981 in San Nicolás) is an Italian Argentine rugby union player who plays as a prop for Leicester Tigers.

Agüero was also part of the team that played in the 2007 Rugby World Cup, which he played one game against Portugal . For a year that was his last appearance for the national team before the call of the new Italy coach, Nick Mallett, during the test match autumn of 2008 and, thereafter, the tour summer 2009 in Australasia.

After the dissolution of Aironi, Agüero joined the new Italian franchise Zebre. On 12 November 2015, Aguero was signed by English club Leicester Tigers for the remainder of the 2015-16 Aviva Premiership season.
