= Virgile Bruni =

French rugby union player

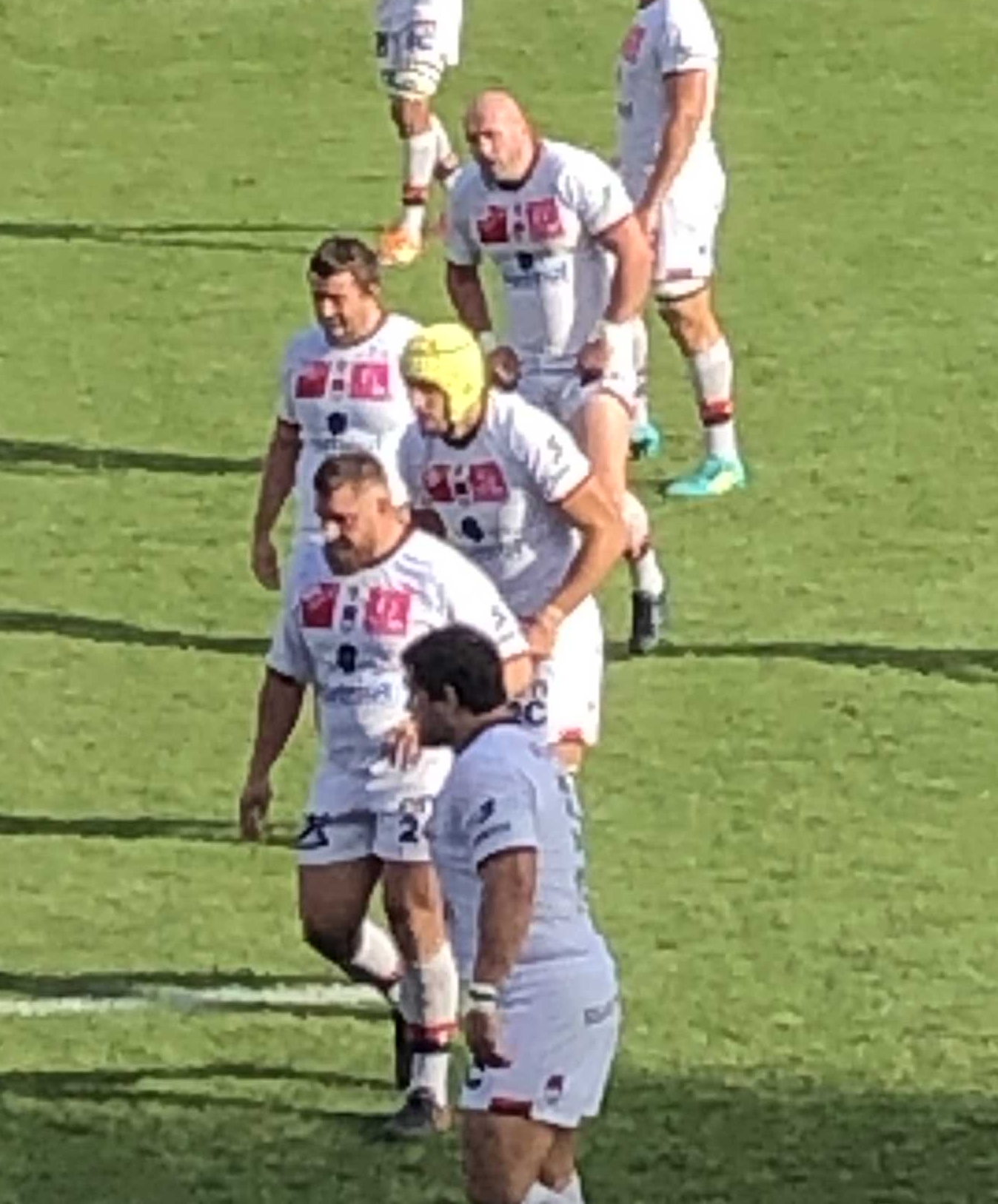
- Bruni (yellow scrum cap) in 2019
- Born: 6 February 1989 (age 37) Toulon, France
- Height: 1.98 m (6 ft 6 in)
- Weight: 108 kg (17 st 0 lb; 238 lb)

Rugby union career
- Position: Flanker or Lock
Senior career
| Years | Team | Apps | (Points) |
| 2012-2016 | Toulon | 55 | (20) |
| 2016- | Lyon | 61 | (20) |
- Correct as of 28 December 2014
National sevens team
| Years | Team | | Comps |
| 2013–2014 | France | | 3(0)France |

Virgile Bruni (born 6 February 1989) is a French rugby union player. His usual position is as a Flanker, and he currently plays for Lyon OU in the Top 14. In January 2014, Bruni was called into the French squad for the 2014 Six Nations Championship.
