= Marc Andreu =

French rugby union player

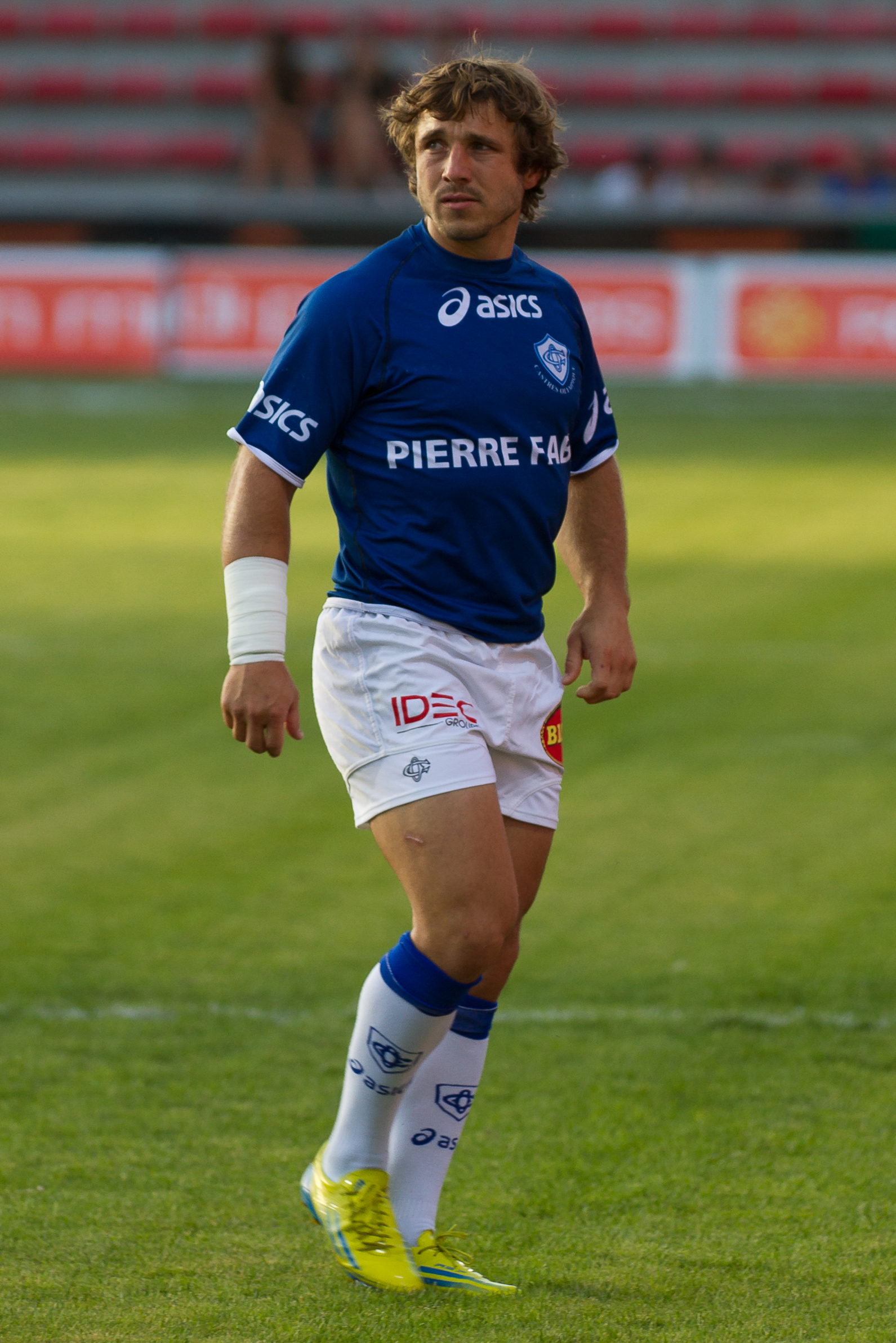
- Born: 27 December 1985 (age 40) Fréjus, France
- Height: 1.65 m (5 ft 5 in)
- Weight: 75 kg (165 lb)

Rugby union career
- Position: Wing
- Current team: La Rochelle
Senior career
Years	Team	Apps	(Points)
2002–2009	Toulon	57	(45)
2009–2013	Castres	106	(130)
2013–2018	Racing 92	111	(215)
2018–2020	La Rochelle	22	(45)
- Correct as of 20 July 2018
International career
Years	Team	Apps	(Points)
2010–2013	France	7	(10)
- Correct as of 22 June 2013

Marc Andreu (born 27 December 1985 in Fréjus, Var) is a French rugby union player. Andreu, who is a wing, plays his club rugby for La Rochelle having previously been at Racing 92. He made his debut for France against Wales on 26 February 2010. He scored his first international try against Italy in a 2010 Six Nations Championship match on 14 March 2010.

== International tries ==
#	Date	Venue	Opponent	Result (France-...)	Competition
1.	14 March 2010	Stade de France, Saint-Denis, France	Italy	46-20	Six Nations Championship
2.	12 June 2010	Newlands Stadium, Cape Town, South Africa	South Africa	17–42	Test Match

== Honours ==
=== Club ===
(France) Castres

- Top 14: 2012–13

(France) Racing 92

- Top 14: 2015–16
