= Pablo Canavosio =

Italy international rugby union player

- Born: Pablo Canavosio; 26 December 1981 (age 44) Córdoba, Argentina
- Height: 1.75 m (5 ft 9 in)
- Weight: 85 kg (13 st 5 lb)

Rugby union career
- Position(s): Scrum-half and Wing
- Current team: Aironi
Senior career
Years	Team	Apps	(Points)
2002-2003	Rovigo	15	(20)
2003-2006	Calvisano	31	(15)
2006-2008	Castres Olympique	23	(15)
2008-2010	Rugby Viadana	31	(20)
2010−2011	Aironi	18	(0)
2011-2016	Calvisano	84	(135)
International career
Years	Team	Apps	(Points)
2005–2011	Italy	38	(30)
- Correct as of 6 October 2011

Pablo Canavosio (born 26 December 1981 in Córdoba, Argentina) is an Italian Argentine rugby union footballer. Canavosio played for Rovigo, Calvisano, Castres Olympique and Aironi. His usual position is at scrum half or wing.

Canavosio has been capped by Italy. He made his international debut in June 2005, as a substitute against Australia in Melbourne. He started in all Italy's games in the 2006 Six Nations Championship, was a replacement in two 2007 Rugby World Cup - Europe qualification matches (in which he scored three tries) and started in the 2006 Autumn internationals against Australia and Argentina. Canavosio played only once during the 2007 Rugby World Cup, against Portugal. He was selected in Italy's squad for the 2008 Six Nations Championship and the 2009 Six Nations Championship. Pablo was selected in Italy's squad for the 2010 Six Nations Championship and he scored a late try as a substitute for Italy in their loss to France. He also played at the 2011 Rugby World Cup.
