= Mathieu Bastareaud =

France international rugby union player

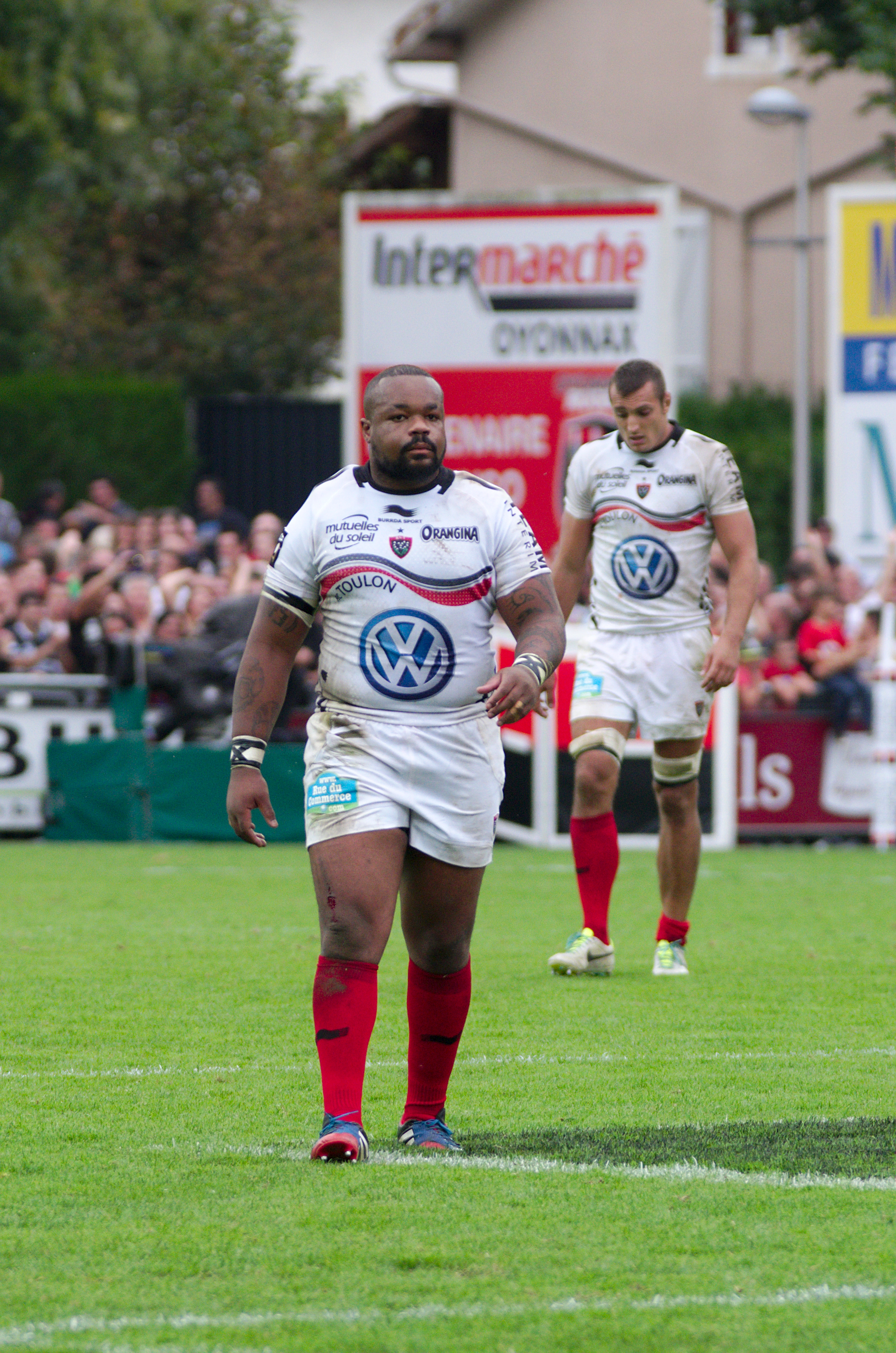
- Born: 17 September 1988 (age 38) Créteil, France
- Height: 1.82 m (6 ft 0 in)
- Weight: 120 kg (18 st 13 lb; 260 lb)

Rugby union career
- Position: Centre / Number 8
Senior career
Years	Team	Apps	(Points)
2006–2007	Massy	14	(25)
2007–2011	Stade Français	99	(103)
2011–2019	Toulon	211	(125)
2019	Lyon	7	(5)
2020	Rugby United New York	5	(10)
2020–2022	Lyon	13	(10)
2022–2023	Toulon	20	(10)
International career
Years	Team	Apps	(Points)
2006–2007	France U19	10	(15)
2008	France U20	6	(15)
2009–2019	France	54	(25)

Mathieu Bastareaud (French pronunciation: [matjø bastaʁo]; born 17 September 1988) is a French former rugby union player. Originally a centre, he played for RC Massy, Stade Français, and then eight seasons for Toulon with whom he won three European Cups and a French Championship. In 2019, he moved to Lyon Olympique Universitaire for one season, where he changed position to number 8. In 2020, he left for the United States where he played for Rugby United New York, before returning to Lyon. In 2022 he returned to Toulon, still as a number 8. He retired in 2023 and is now team manager of Toulon.

Bastareaud represented France at Under 19 and Under 20 levels before winning the first of his 54 caps in 2009. He won the 2010 Six Nations tournament and played in the 2015 World Cup with France. He retired from international rugby in 2019.

== Club career ==
Bastareaud played for Creteil Rugby youth squads and then moved to Massy. He went through the junior academy there and played for the third division club RC Massy. He attracted national attention and after two seasons he moved to Stade Français.

He was included in the 2009 Six Nations Championship squad. He impressed in the match against Wales, which France won 21–16, on 27 February 2009, which was also his Six Nations Championship debut. He later played against England and as a replacement against Italy in the same competition. Matthieu was involved in the 2010 Six Nations Championship and was a key figure for the French side. He scored two tries against Scotland at Murrayfield. He was rested for the majority of the game against Italy but was brought on for the last 15 minutes.

In July 2011 Bastareaud was finally allowed to join Toulon. He had previously declared his wish to leave and with Stade Francais suffering major financial difficulties, (which saw them come close to being relegated) his wish was eventually granted. He signed a 3-year contract. In May 2013 he was named as man of the match as Toulon won the 2013 Heineken Cup Final by 16–15 against Clermont Auvergne.

Despite the presence of French international captain Guilhem Guirado in Toulon, Bastareaud was selected as captain for the 2017/18 season, with South African team-mate Duane Vermeulen struggling with injury. After being caught swearing at Benetton flanker Sebastian Negri in 2018, Bastareaud was suspended for three weeks.

It was announced in April 2019 that Bastareaud would leave Toulon after the 2018/19 season to join US side Rugby United New York in Major League Rugby.

On 18 April 2020, Bastareaud returned to France to join Lyon back in the Top 14 on a two-year contract beginning in the 2020–21 season. In 2022 he rejoined Toulon.

== International career ==
Bastareaud was included in the French tour to New Zealand and Australia in June 2009, but returned to France early after sustaining facial injuries. He initially claimed that he had been assaulted from behind by "four or five men" outside his Wellington hotel as he was returning from a night out. The New Zealand Police launched an investigation into the assault and turned up security camera footage of Bastareaud returning uninjured to his hotel with four other people at 5:22 am that night, confirming the assault could not have taken place. Bastareaud subsequently stated that he had been drunk and had sustained the injuries after tripping over a table in his hotel room, and that he had concocted the original story in order to avoid getting in trouble with team management.

The incident proved to have diplomatic implications. Following the initial assault allegation, international media speculated on New Zealand's security and suitability as a tourist destination and host country, especially leading into the 2011 Rugby World Cup, spurring New Zealand Prime Minister John Key to issue an official apology for the incident. Following the later revelations, French Prime Minister François Fillon sent a letter to Key, in which he apologised for the unfortunate affair and spoke of the strong relationship between France and New Zealand, a rare official intervention in sporting issues for the French. Then on 29 June, L'Equipe reported that Bastareaud had been admitted to a psychiatric facility after attempting suicide. Pierre Camou, President of the French Rugby Federation has referred the case to their Disciplinary Committee and asked them to investigate.

In 2010, Bastareaud was selected to the French Barbarians squad to play Tonga on 26 November.

Bastareaud started his first test in two years in 2017, against New Zealand in a 38–18 loss. Bastareaud had not made it onto the international field since he started in the 2015 Rugby World Cup quarter final, where the French lost to New Zealand 62–13. Bastareaud's two-year absence was caused by the fact that he had struggled with form loss and with injuries since the World Cup.

Bastareaud missed the opening round of the 2018 Six Nations Championship due to suspension. He returned to international rugby on 23 February 2018 to start against Italy. Bastareaud had the final say in the fixture, scoring a try in the 73rd minute. His try was converted by François Trinh-Duc to make the final score against the Italians a 34–17 win, France's first international win in over 11 months. Bastareaud continued his return with good form and he ended up captaining France for the first time on 17 March 2018 during a 13–14 loss to Wales.

On 19 June 2019, Bastareaud announced his retirement from international rugby after not being selected for France's Rugby World Cup warm-up matches.

== Personal life ==
French international football player, William Gallas, is Bastareaud's cousin.
