= Nick Mallett =

South African rugby union player and coach

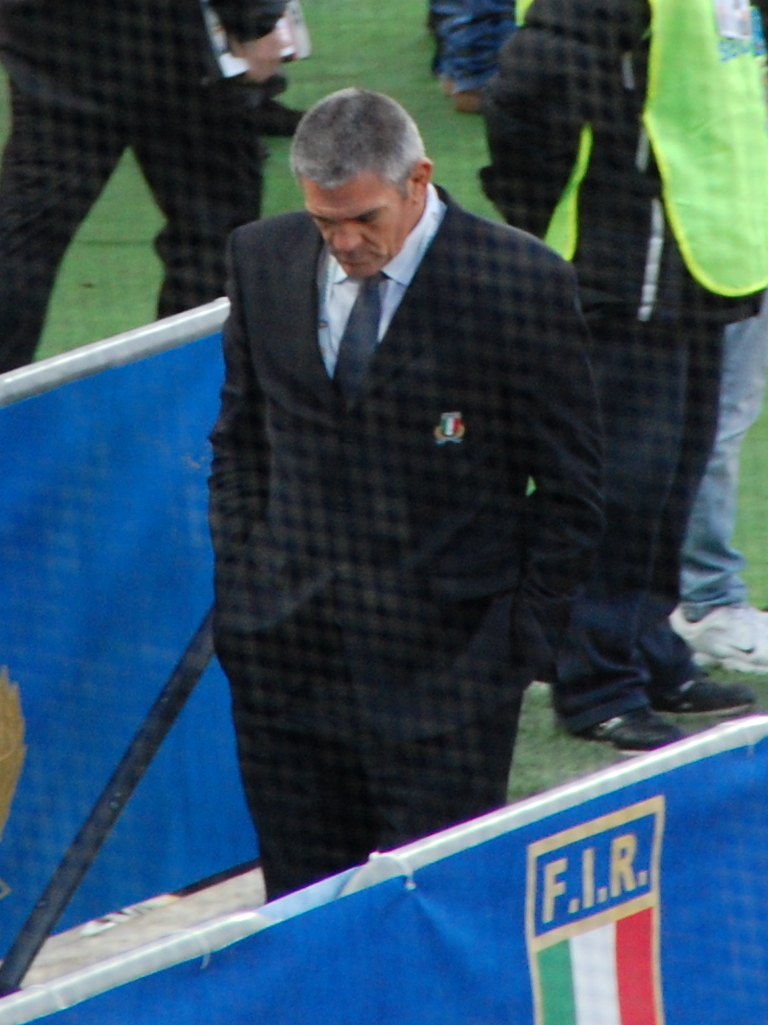
- Born: Nicholas Vivian Haward Mallett; 30 October 1956 (age 70) Haileybury, England
- Height: 193 cm (6 ft 4 in)
- Weight: 102 kg (225 lb)
- School: St. Andrew's College, Grahamstown
- University: University of Cape Town; University of Oxford

Rugby union career
- Position: Number eight
Amateur team(s)
Years	Team	Apps	(Points)
1977	Western Province		
1979–1980	Oxford University RFC		
1980–1985	Western Province		
1982–1983	Rugby Rovigo		
1985–1990	Saint-Claude		
1990–1992	Boulogne-Billancourt		
International career
Years	Team	Apps	(Points)
1984	South Africa	2	(4)
Coaching career
- Years: Team
- 1984–1985: Rugby Rovigo
- 1985–1990: Saint-Claude
- 1994–1995: False Bay Rugby Club
- 1995–1996: Boland Cavaliers
- 1996–1997: South Africa (assistant coach)
- 1997–2000: South Africa
- 2002–2004: Stade Français Paris
- 2007–2011: Italy
- 2009: Barbarians
- 2013: South African Barbarians
- 2014: World XV

Nicholas Vivian Haward Mallett (born 30 October 1956) is a former South African rugby union player who played for the Springboks, South Africa's national rugby union team, in 1984. He also coached the Springboks between 1997 and 2000 and was the head coach of Italy's rugby union team between 2007 and 2011.

== Early life ==
Born on 30 October 1956 in Hertford Heath, England, Mallett moved to Rhodesia with his family in 1956 when he was only six weeks old, and his father, Tony Mallett, took up a post as an English teacher at the recently founded Peterhouse Boys' School, in Marandellas near Salisbury. Nick first arrived in Cape Town, South Africa in 1963, when his father was appointed Headmaster of Diocesan College, after which he attended St. Andrew's College, Grahamstown. He graduated from the University of Cape Town in 1977 with a BA in English and History. While a student at the university, he was selected to play for the Western Province rugby union team.

== Playing career ==
In 1979 Mallett moved back to England to attend University College at the University of Oxford, where he not only gained further qualifications but also won Blues in rugby union and cricket, famously hitting three sixes in one over off Ian Botham. Eventually he returned to South Africa, where he represented Western Province in four consecutive Currie Cup wins between 1982 and 1985, and played two games for the Springboks in 1984 against the South American Jaguars.

=== Test history ===
No.	Opponents	Results (SA 1st)	Position	Tries	Dates	Venue
1.	South American Jaguars	32–15	Number 8	1	20 Oct 1984	Loftus Versfeld, Pretoria
2.	South American Jaguars	22–13	Number 8		27 Oct 1984	Newlands, Cape Town

== Coaching career ==
=== The beginning ===
Mallett once again left South Africa in 1985, this time for France, where he played and coached rugby for seven years until 1992 before eventually returning to South Africa in 1994 and taking a job as Head of the False Bay Rugby Club until 1995.

Between 1995 and 1996, Mallett took up the role of head coach of the Boland Cavaliers before being appointed assistant coach to the Springboks in 1996 and finally getting the job of Springbok Coach in 1997.

=== Coach of Springboks (1997–2000) ===
Between August 1997 and December 1998, under Mallett's guidance, the Springboks went on a record winning streak of 17 consecutive test wins. As part of the unbeaten run the Springboks won the Tri Nations Series undefeated and beat several teams by record margins, including a 52–10 against France in Paris, a 68–10 win over Scotland in Edinburgh, a 33–0 defeat of Ireland and a 96–13 against Wales. The run ended when the Springbok team was defeated by England at Twickenham at the end of a long tour on 5 December 1998.

The relationship between Mallet and Gary Teichmann, one of South Africa's most successful team captains ever (with 36 wins), began to sour and Teichman was controversially excluded from the 1999 Rugby World Cup squad. Mallet looked for a new captain, first turning to Corné Krige then Rassie Erasmus, Joost van der Westhuizen and André Vos for a solution. In the end, despite the internal instability in the squad, the Springboks managed four consecutive wins and were finally knocked out of the championship in the semi-final by eventual winners Australia. Despite his team's relatively mediocre results of 8 wins and 5 losses in 1999, the Springboks still managed to break more records, beating Italy 101–0 and England in the quarter-final 44–21, with Jannie de Beer kicking a world-record five drop goals in that game.

In 2000, Mallett accused the South Africa Rugby Football Union (SARFU) of "greed" for selling Tri-Nations championship tickets at inflated prices. He had alienated the SARFU executive, and on 27 September he resigned as national coach at the start of a disciplinary hearing began into allegations that his comments had brought the game into disrepute. Some fans, upset by how he had treated Teichman and his team's sudden poor performance, were also keen to see him go.

In spite of his team's relatively poor performance and the internal strife that marred his final years as coach, Mallett remains one of South Africa's most successful coaches ever, having won 27 of the 38 tests played under his guidance and rewriting the record books several times

=== Stade Français (2002–04) ===
Mallett moved back to France as coach for the Paris club Stade Français Paris, which he led to two consecutive French domestic title wins in 2003 and 2004 before returning to South Africa where he accepted the job of Director of Rugby at Western Province. Initially there was speculation that he might coach the Springbok team again, but those rumours were quashed by the appointment of Jake White as the new South African coach.

Mallet was linked with the position of England coach after the coerced resignation of Andy Robinson in 2006, a position that eventually went to Brian Ashton. In 2007 Mallett became coach of Italy.

=== Italy (2007–11) ===
On 3 October 2007, Mallett replaced Frenchman Pierre Berbizier as "CT" ("Technical Commissioner", i.e. coach) of the Italy national rugby union team. His Six Nations debut was fairly impressive; Italy were defeated by Ireland 11–16 in the first game, but came close to victory against Jonny Wilkinson's England team. Italy lost also against Wales and France. In those matches he gave Andrea Marcato and Alberto Sgarbi their debuts'. In the final game, Mallett's team beat Scotland 23–20, thanks to Marcato's late drop goal. However, Italy won the wooden spoon because their points difference was worse than Scotland's.

During the summer test matches, he got a good result against South Africa, the world champions at the time, in Cape Town, despite Italy losing 0–26. In Córdoba Italy beat Argentina for the first time thanks to Leonardo Ghiraldini's try and a late penalty by Marcato.

He also coached the Barbarians against the All Blacks in December 2009 with the 'Baa-Baas' winning 25–18. In 2010 Mallet coached the Barbarians to victory over South Africa.

In the 2010 Six Nations, Mallett guided Italy to a 16–12 win against Scotland. Despite this victory, Italy's only win in the competition, Italy still finished last because Scotland's points difference was just one better. In the 2011 Six Nations Championship, Italy beat France by 22–21 in arguably their best victory to date.

=== Retirement (2011–present) ===
In November 2011, after the World Cup in New Zealand, Nick Mallett's contract as head coach of Italy expired and he returned to Cape Town with Frenchman Jacques Brunel taking over the Italy job. Mallett has stated that he wishes to spend time with his family in South Africa, despite being briefly linked to the position as coach of England following Martin Johnson's resignation.

Sporting positions
Preceded by (France) Pierre Berbizier	Italy national rugby union team coach 2007–2011	Succeeded by (France) Jacques Brunel
Preceded by (South Africa) Carel du Plessis	South Africa national rugby union team coach 1997–2000	Succeeded by (South Africa) Harry Viljoen
