= Leonardo Ghiraldini =

Italy international rugby union player

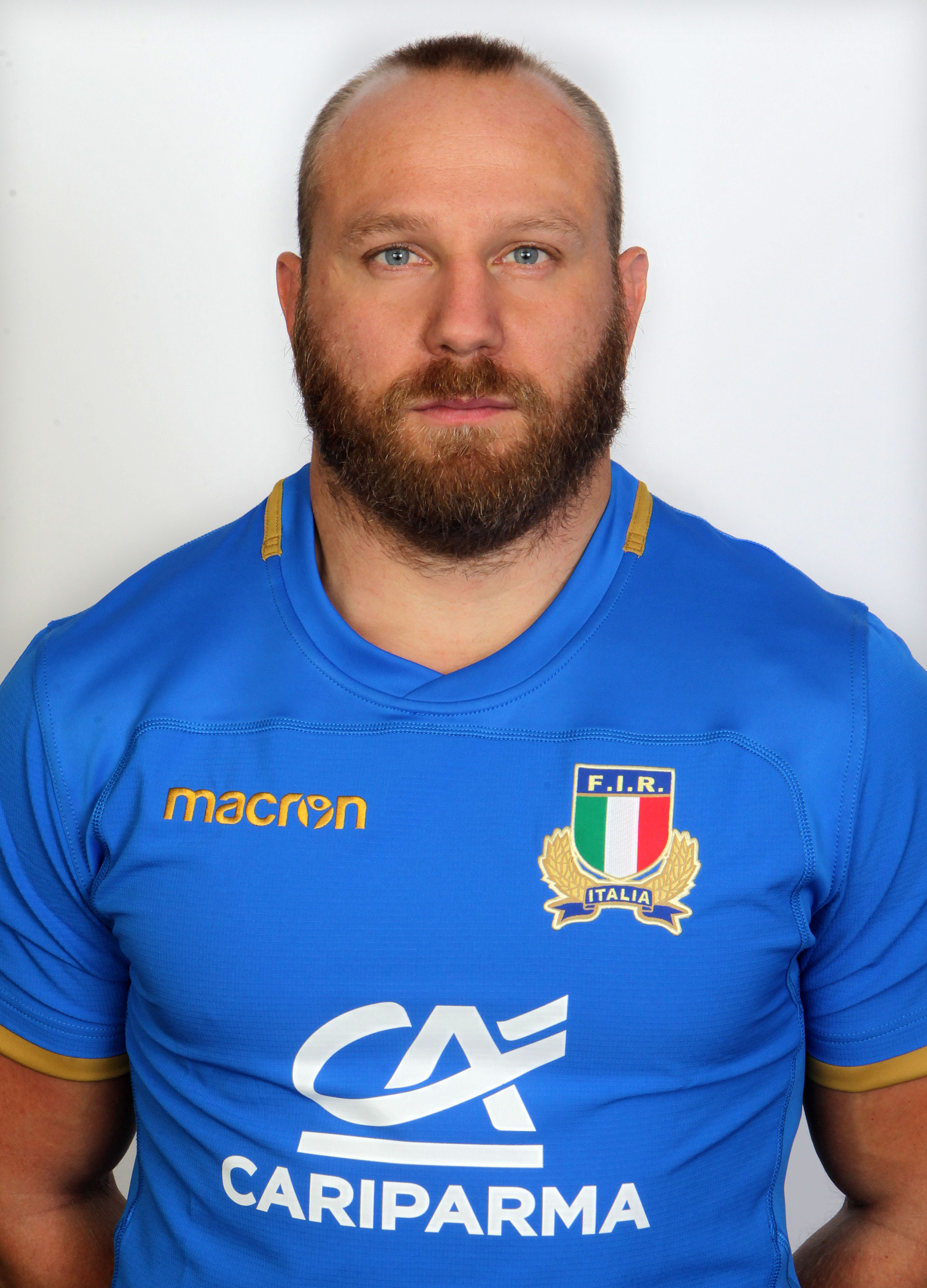
- Ghiraldini in 2016
- Born: Leonardo Lorenzo Ghiraldini; 26 December 1984 (age 41) Padua, Italy
- Height: 1.83 m (6 ft 0 in)
- Weight: 103 kg (16 st 3 lb; 227 lb)

Rugby union career
- Position: Hooker
Senior career
Years	Team	Apps	(Points)
2003–2005	Petrarca	19	(5)
2005–2008	Calvisano	71	(15)
2009–2014	Benetton Treviso	70	(20)
2014−2016	Leicester Tigers	29	(0)
2016–2019	Toulouse	52	(20)
2020	Bordeaux Bègles		
- Correct as of October 2016
International career
Years	Team	Apps	(Points)
2005–2007	Italy A	3	(0)
2006–2020	Italy	107	(30)
- Correct as of 5 Dec 2020

Leonardo Ghiraldini (born 26 December 1984) is a retired Italian international rugby union player. Ghiraldini's playing position is hooker.

== Club career ==
Ghiraldini began his career with Petrarca Rugby in his home town of Padua before moving to Rugby Calvisano in 2005, where, as captain, he won the Super 10 (now Top12) in 2008 and was a runner-up with them in 2006. In 2009, Ghiraldini moved to Benetton Treviso, which joined the Celtic League in 2010.

On 21 May 2014, Ghiraldini moved to England to join Leicester Tigers in the Aviva Premiership for the 2014-15 season. In December 2015, Ghiraldini joined top French club Toulouse in the Top 14 on a three-year deal.

== International career ==
Ghiraldini played for the Italian U-18, U-19, and U-21 teams before playing for the Italy A Team. He was regarded as one of Italian rugby's stars of the future.

Ghiraldini played his first international game against Japan during Italy's 2006 summer tour. Ghiraldini was in the Italian squad for the 2007 Six Nations Championship and the 2007 Rugby World Cup, he made his World Cup debut against Portugal. He was in the Italy squad for the 2008 Six Nations Championship, playing as starting hooker in all five games of the tournament.

For the 2010 Six Nations Championship, Ghiraldini was named Italian captain after Sergio Parisse was ruled out of the tournament with an injury.

On 18 August 2019, he was named in the final 31-man squad for the 2019 Rugby World Cup and he represented Italy on 107 occasions, from 2006 to 2020.

== Honours ==
=== Calvisano ===
- Super 10 winner (1): 2008. runner-up (1): 2006

Preceded by Sergio Parisse	Italy Captain; 2010–present	Succeeded by Incumbent
