= Alexandre Lapandry =

French rugby union player (born 1989)

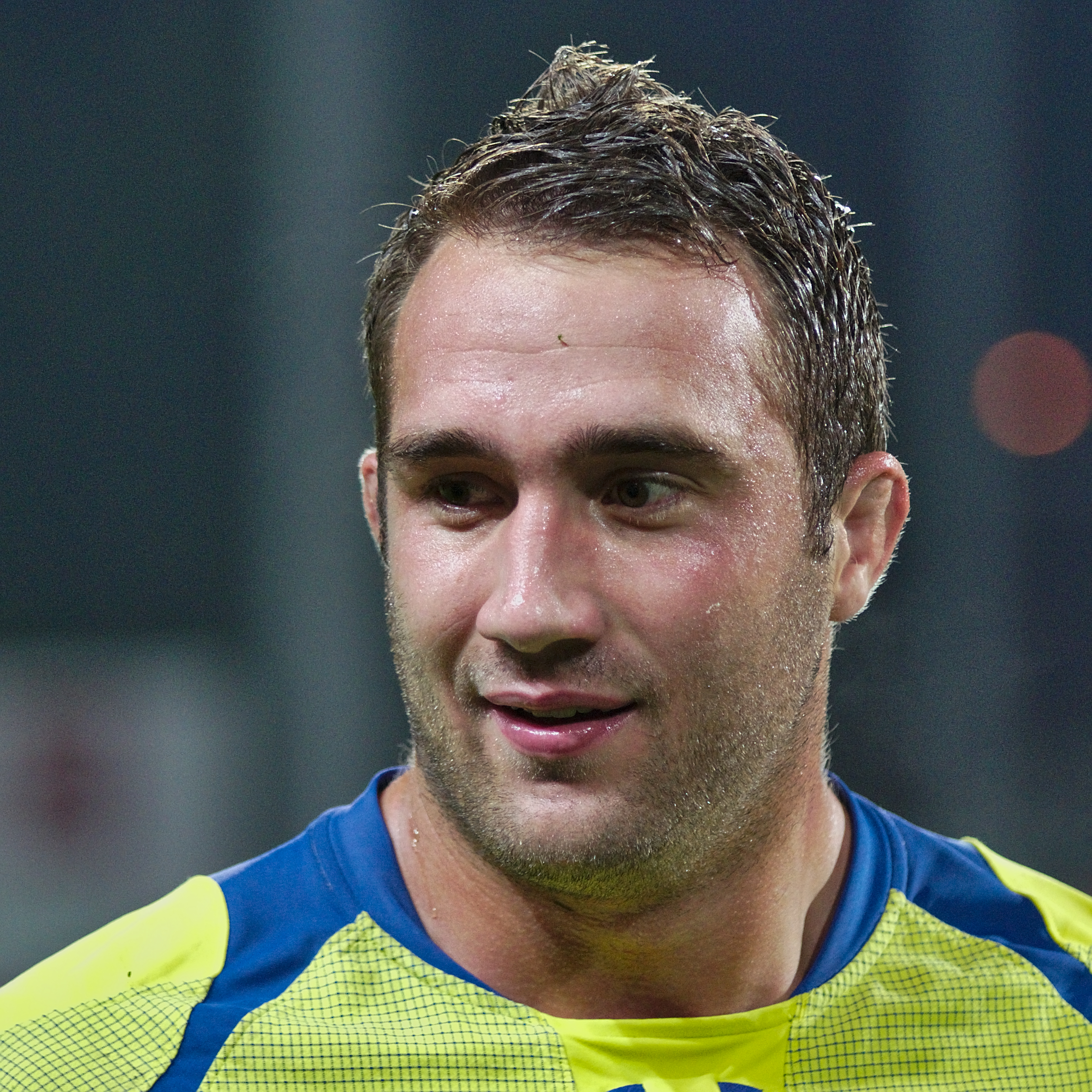
- Born: Alexandre Lapandry; 13 April 1989 (age 37) Paray-le-Monial, France
- Height: 1.94 m (6 ft 4 1/2 in)
- Weight: 101 kg (223 lb; 15.9 st)

Rugby union career
- Position: Flanker
- Current team: Clermont
Senior career
Years	Team	Apps	(Points)
2008–	Clermont	261	(130)
- Correct as of 3 March 2022
International career
Years	Team	Apps	(Points)
2008–	France	13	(10)
- Correct as of 23 June 2018

Alexandre Lapandry (French pronunciation: [alɛksɑ̃dʁ lapɑ̃dʁi]; born 13 April 1989 in Paray-le-Monial, Saône-et-Loire) is a French rugby union player. Lapandry, who is a flanker, plays his club rugby for ASM Clermont Auvergne. He made his debut for France against Samoa on 21 November 2009. He played in the final as Clermont won the Top 14 title in 2009–10.

Lapandry captained the French under-20 team at the 2009 IRB Junior World Championship.
