= David Wilson (rugby union, born 1985) =

England international rugby union player

Dave Wilson
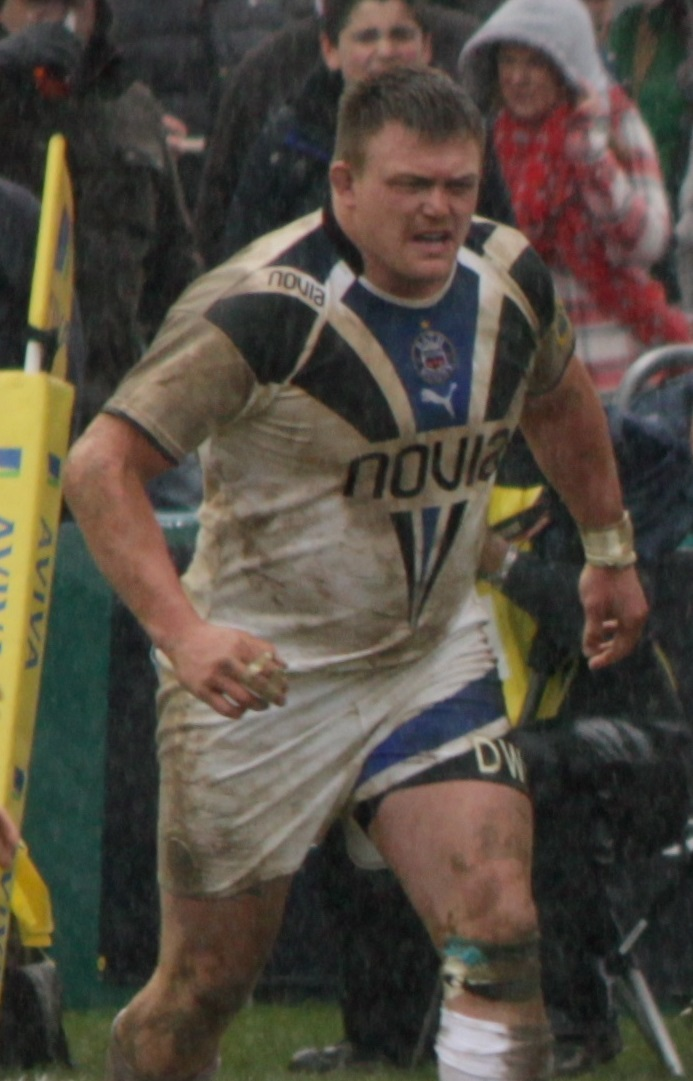
- Wilson playing for Bath Rugby in 2013
- Born: David George Wilson; 9 April 1985 (age 41) South Shields, England
- Height: 1.87 m (6 ft 2 in)
- Weight: 126 kg (278 lb; 19 st 12 lb)
- School: Harton Technology College; East Durham College

Rugby union career
- Position: Tighthead Prop
Senior career
Years	Team	Apps	(Points)
2003–2009	Newcastle Falcons	75	(5)
2009–2016	Bath	136	(20)
2016–2019	Newcastle Falcons	83	(10)
- Correct as of 11 May 2023
International career
Years	Team	Apps	(Points)
2008–2009	England Saxons	4	(0)
2009–2015	England	44	(5)
- Correct as of 19 May 2019

David George Wilson (born 9 April 1985) is a former English rugby union player. A tighthead prop, he played for Newcastle Falcons and Bath and represented England at two World Cups.

== Club career ==
Wilson made his debut for Newcastle Falcons in a 2003 League fixture against Bath Rugby. After struggling to displace teammate Carl Hayman, Wilson joined Bath for the 2009–10 season. On 22 May 2014 Wilson started for the side that lost to Northampton Saints in the final of the EPCR Challenge Cup at Cardiff Arms Park. The following season saw Bath finish runners up to Saracens in the 2015 Premiership final. He made over 100 appearances during his spell at the Rec.

In September 2016 Wilson re-signed with Newcastle Falcons. The Falcons reached the Premiership play-off stage during the 2017–18 season and Wilson played in their semi-final defeat against Exeter Chiefs. In 2019 he retired from Rugby due to injuries and is a student.

== International career ==
Wilson represented England at the 2006 Under 21 Rugby World Championship. He made his debut for the England Saxons side that defeated Ireland A on 1 February 2008.

On 6 June 2009 Wilson made his full England debut in England's 37–15 victory over Argentina at Old Trafford. He was selected for the 2010 tour of Australia and played in the second test victory against the Wallabies to draw the series.

Wilson was a member of the side that won the 2011 Six Nations Championship. Later that year he was chosen for the 2011 Rugby World Cup and made his only appearance of the tournament during the pool stage against Romania.

New England coach Stuart Lancaster retained Wilson and in December 2012 he played in a victory over New Zealand. He scored his only international try on 15 November 2014 in a defeat against South Africa. Wilson was included in the squad for the 2015 Rugby World Cup as the hosts failed to reach the knockout phase. His only appearance of the tournament occurred during their ultimate pool fixture against Uruguay which proved to be his last cap for England.

=== International tries ===
As of 15 November 2014

Try	Opposing team	Location	Venue	Competition	Date	Result	Score
1	South Africa	London, England	Twickenham Stadium	2014 end-of-year rugby union internationals	15 November 2014	Loss	28 – 31

== Honours ==
England

- Six Nations Championship: 2011

Bath

- Premiership runner up: 2014–15
- EPCR Challenge Cup runner up: 2013–14
