= Gonzalo García (rugby union, born 1984) =

Italy international rugby union player

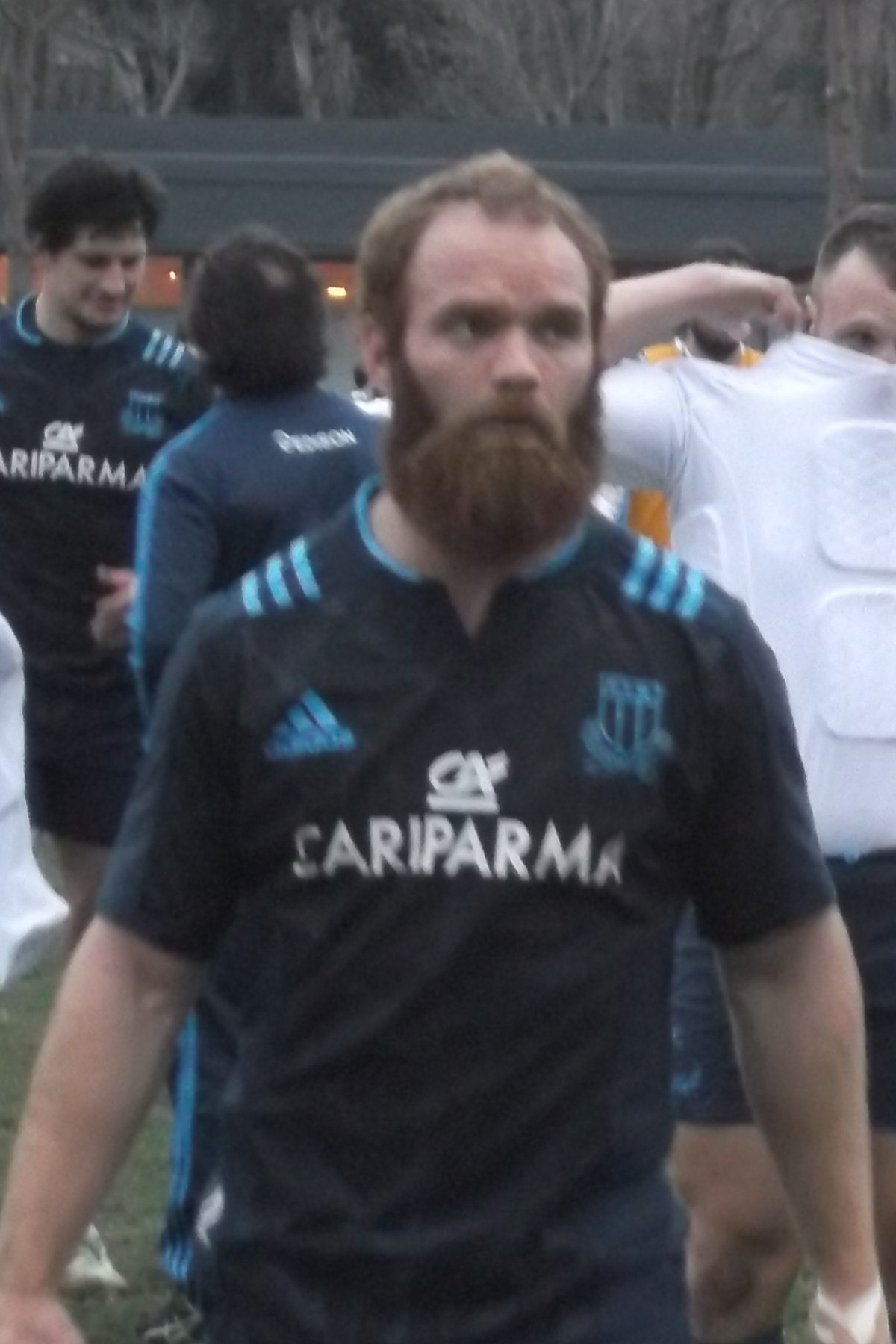
- Born: Gonzalo Manuel García; 18 February 1984 (age 42) Mendoza, Argentina
- Height: 1.85 m (6 ft 1 in)
- Weight: 96 kg (212 lb)

Rugby union career
- Position: Centre
- Current team: Zebre
Senior career
Years	Team	Apps	(Points)
2007–08	Rugby Calvisano	36	(30)
2008–12	Benetton Treviso	28	(5)
2012–16	Zebre	56	(74)
2016−17	Cahors		
- Correct as of 28 August 2015
International career
Years	Team	Apps	(Points)
2008–16	Italy	44	(21)
- Correct as of 19 March 2016
Coaching career
- Years: Team
- 2019–2022: Lyons Piacenza (Head Coach)
- 2022−2024: Zebre Parma Academy (Head Coach)
- 2022−2023: Emerging Italy (Head Coach)
- 2024−: Colorno (Head Coach)

Gonzalo Manuel García (born February 18, 1984) was an Argentine-born Italian rugby union player for Zebre in the Pro14 competition. Gonzalo García's position was centre. From summer 2024 he is Head coach of Colorno.

== Biography ==
García was born in Mendoza, Argentina and made his debut for that city's side Maristas, winning the provincial title in 2006. He played the U-19 World Cup in France in 2003 and the U-21 World Cup in Argentina in 2005 for Argentina.

In 2007 he moved to Italy to play with Rugby Calvisano, subsequently choosing the Italian nationality. He is of Italian descent through his maternal great-grandfather. After winning an Italian title at Calvisano in 2008, he moved to Benetton Treviso in the Pro12.

García debuted for the Italian national team against South Africa in Cape Town on 21 June 2008, in a 26–0 loss. He scored his first test match try against South Africa on 21 November 2009 in the Stadio Friuli, Udine. He was called for the 2011 Rugby World Cup, playing in three games but without scoring.

From summer 2022 to 2024 he was coach of Zebre Parma Academy.
