= François Trinh-Duc =

France international rugby union player (born 1986)

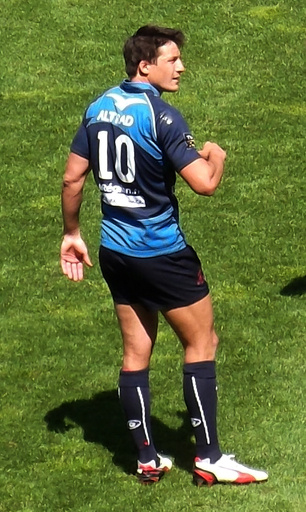
- Born: François Trinh-Duc; 11 November 1986 (age 40) Montpellier, France
- Height: 1.85 m (6 ft 1 in)
- Weight: 85 kg (13 st 5 lb; 187 lb)

Rugby union career
- Position(s): Fly-half, Centre
Amateur team(s)
Years	Team	Apps	(Points)
- Pic-Saint-Loup
Senior career
Years	Team	Apps	(Points)
2004–2016	Montpellier	201	(607)
2016–2019	Toulon	61	(301)
2019–2021	Racing 92	30	(46)
2021–2022	Bordeaux Bègles	26	(81)
International career
Years	Team	Apps	(Points)
2008–2018	France	66	(93)
Medal record
Men's Rugby union
Representing France
Rugby World Cup
Silver medal – second place	2011 New Zealand	Squad

François Trinh-Duc (French: [fʁɑ̃swa tʁɛ̃dyk]; born 11 November 1986) is a former French rugby union player. Trinh-Duc's regular position was as a fly-half or inside centre.

== Early life ==
Trinh-Duc was born in Montpellier.

Trinh-Duc started playing rugby at the age of 4 at the Pic-Saint-Loup rugby school near his native city. There, he played with his future Montpellier team-mate Fulgence Ouedraogo.

== Rugby career ==
With fellow Montpelliérains Louis Picamoles and Julien Tomas, who are part of the Montpellier Hérault Rugby Club's, attempted "shaking up the old order" of French rugby in the Septimanie terroir which had been a historical rival Béziers's stronghold.

Trinh-Duc was called up by Marc Lièvremont to the France squad for the 2008 Six Nations Championship, and has played in all of France's matches in the competition to date.

Trinh-Duc's drop goal helped France beat England 19–12 at Eden Park in quarter-final in 2011 Rugby World Cup. He came on as a substitute for the injured Morgan Parra in the 23rd minute of the final against New Zealand. He set in motion the move that led to Thierry Dusautoir's try in the 47th minute and converted the try to make the score 8–7. With 15 minutes remaining and the score still at 8–7, France were awarded a penalty to put them in front for the first time, but Trinh-Duc's 48m penalty attempt was wide off the mark and the All Blacks went on to win the final.

On 19 March 2021, Trinh Duc left Racing 92 for Top 14 rivals Bordeaux from the 2021–22 season.

== Personal life ==
François Trinh-Duc (Vietnamese: Trịnh Đức, IPA: [ʈʂɨ̂ɲˀ ɗɨ̌k]) was noted as one of the first ever rugby players of Vietnamese heritage to play for the French national side. His paternal grandfather, Trịnh Đức Nhiên, was born in French Indochina. He was drafted in compulsory labor service during the Second World War and arrived in France in April 1940. He then settled in Agen in Lot-et-Garonne. Nhiên later married an Italian-Argentine woman who birthed Philippe, Trinh-Duc's father. (Note: Photograph of Trinh Duc Nhien, from travailleurs-indochinois.org (see list for "Trinh Duc Nhien": la liste du memorial)

== International tries ==
#	Date	Venue	Opponent	Result (France-...)	Competition
1.	5 July 2008	Suncorp Stadium, Brisbane, Australia	Australia	10–40	Test Match
2.	21 March 2009	Stade de France, Saint-Denis, France	Italy	50–8	Six Nations Championship
3.	13 June 2009	Carisbrook, Dunedin, New Zealand	New Zealand	27–22	Test Match
4.	21 November 2009	Stade de France, Saint-Denis, France	Samoa	43–5	Test Match
5.	21 November 2009	Stade de France, Saint-Denis, France	Samoa	43–5	Test Match
6.	26 February 2010	Millennium Stadium, Cardiff, Wales	Wales	26–20	Six Nations Championship
7.	20 August 2011	Aviva Stadium, Dublin, Ireland	Ireland	26–22	Test Match
8.	10 September 2011	North Harbour Stadium, North Shore City, New Zealand	Japan	47–21	2011 Rugby World Cup
9.	24 September 2011	Eden Park, Auckland, New Zealand	New Zealand	17–37	2011 Rugby World Cup
