= 2008 Six Nations Championship =

Rugby championship

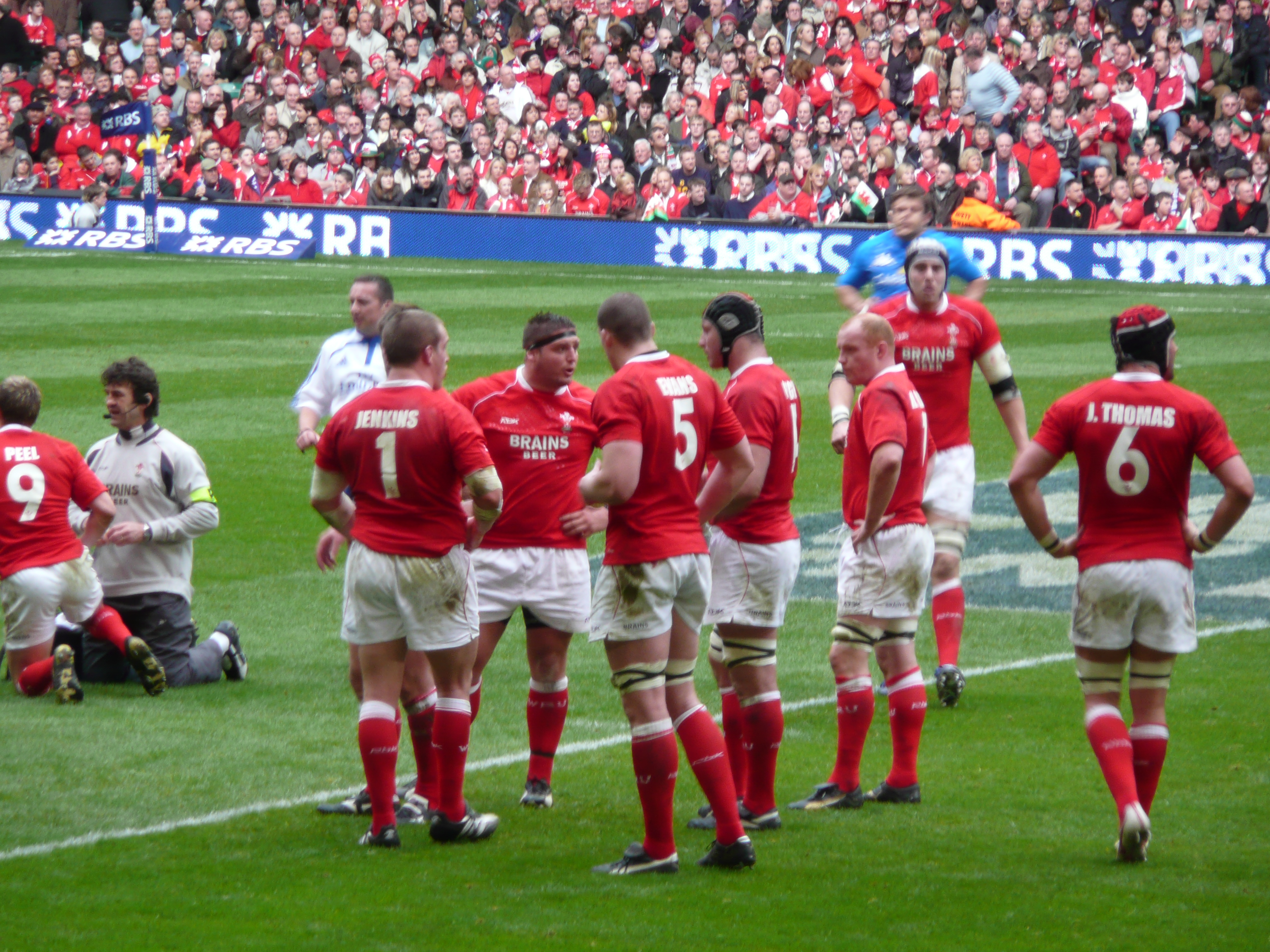
- The Welsh team that won the Grand Slam
- Date: 2 February – 15 March 2008
- Countries: England; France; Ireland; Italy; Scotland; Wales

Tournament statistics
- Champions: Wales (24th title)
- Grand Slam: Wales (10th title)
- Triple Crown: Wales (19th title)
- Matches played: 15
- Attendance: 1,053,616 (70,241 per match)
- Tries scored: 50 (3.33 per match)
- Top point scorer: (England) Jonny Wilkinson (50)
- Top try scorer: (Wales) Shane Williams (6)
- Player of the tournament: (Wales) Shane Williams

The 2008 Six Nations Championship, known as the 2008 RBS 6 Nations because of sponsorship by the Royal Bank of Scotland, was the ninth series of the rugby union Six Nations Championship, the 114th series of the international championship.

Fifteen matches were played over five weekends from 2 February to 15 March, resulting in Wales winning the Grand Slam, their second in the last four championships and tenth overall. In winning the Grand Slam, Wales also won the Triple Crown, for beating each of the other Home Nations, for the 19th time. Wales conceded only two tries in the championship, beating England's previous record of four tries conceded. Wales' Shane Williams was named the Player of the Championship.

== Participants ==
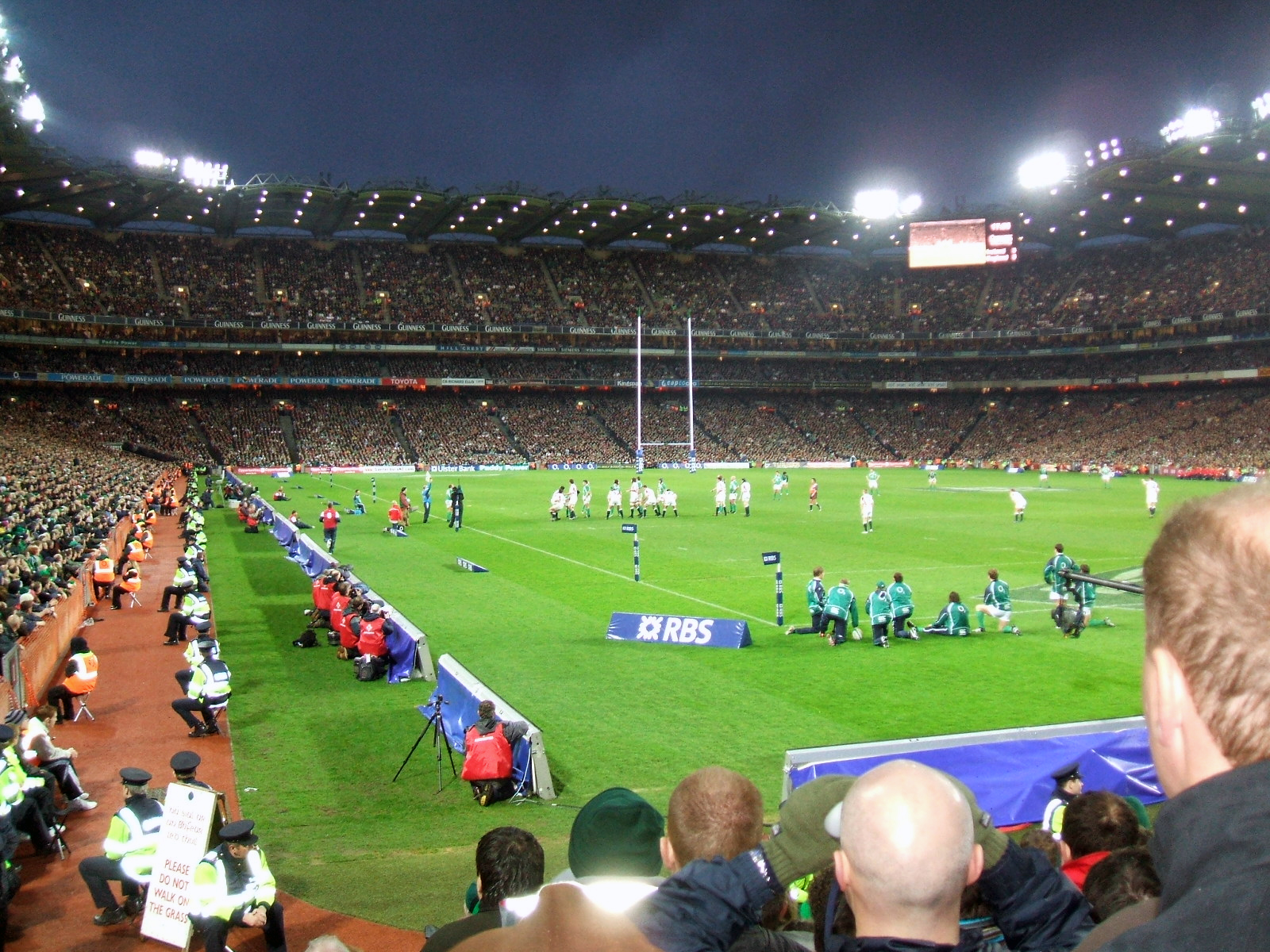
For the second year running, Ireland played their home games at Croke Park during the redevelopment of Lansdowne Road.

Nation	Venue	City	Head coach	Captain
England	Twickenham Stadium	London	(England) Brian Ashton	Phil Vickery
France	Stade de France	Saint-Denis	(France) Marc Lièvremont	Lionel Nallet
Ireland	Croke Park (Note: Lansdowne Road, Ireland's traditional home, is being redeveloped and is expected to be back in use by 2009.)	Dublin	(Republic of Ireland) Eddie O'Sullivan	Brian O'Driscoll (Note: Ronan O'Gara captained Ireland in their final match against England, which O'Driscoll missed due to a hamstring tear.)
Italy	Stadio Flaminio	Rome	(South Africa) Nick Mallett	Sergio Parisse
Scotland	Murrayfield Stadium	Edinburgh	(Scotland) Frank Hadden	Jason White (Note: White missed Scotland's third game because of concussion and started on the bench in the last two games. He was replaced as captain for these games by Mike Blair.)
Wales	Millennium Stadium	Cardiff	(New Zealand) Warren Gatland	Ryan Jones

== Table ==
Pos	Team	Pld	W	D	L	PF	PA	PD	T	Pts
1	Wales	5	5	0	0	148	66	+82	13	10
2	England	5	3	0	2	108	83	+25	8	6
3	France	5	3	0	2	103	93	+10	11	6
4	Ireland	5	2	0	3	93	99	−6	9	4
5	Scotland	5	1	0	4	69	123	−54	3	2
6	Italy	5	1	0	4	74	131	−57	6	2

Source: ESPN

== Results ==
=== Round 1 ===
2 February 2008
14:00

Ireland	16–11	Italy
Try: Dempsey 18' c Con: O'Gara (1/1); Pen: O'Gara (3/4) 12', 57', 66'	Report	Try: Castrogiovanni 60' m Pen: Bortolussi (2/3) 38', 70'

Croke Park, Dublin
Attendance: 75,387
Referee: Jonathan Kaplan (South Africa)

FB	15	Girvan Dempsey
RW	14	Andrew Trimble
OC	13	Brian O'Driscoll (c)
IC	12	Gordon D'Arcy
LW	11	Geordan Murphy
FH	10	Ronan O'Gara
SH	9	Eoin Reddan
N8	8	Denis Leamy
OF	7	David Wallace
BF	6	Simon Easterby
RL	5	Malcolm O'Kelly
LL	4	Donncha O'Callaghan
TP	3	John Hayes
HK	2	Rory Best
LP	1	Marcus Horan
Replacements:
HK	16	Bernard Jackman
PR	17	Tony Buckley
LK	18	Mick O'Driscoll
N8	19	Jamie Heaslip
SH	20	Peter Stringer
FH	21	Paddy Wallace
FB	22	Rob Kearney
Coach:
Eddie O'Sullivan

FB	15	David Bortolussi
RW	14	Kaine Robertson
OC	13	Gonzalo Canale
IC	12	Mirco Bergamasco
LW	11	Pablo Canavosio
FH	10	Andrea Masi
SH	9	Pietro Travagli
N8	8	Sergio Parisse (c)
OF	7	Mauro Bergamasco
BF	6	Josh Sole
RL	5	Carlo Del Fava
LL	4	Santiago Dellapè
TP	3	Martín Castrogiovanni
HK	2	Leonardo Ghiraldini
LP	1	Andrea Lo Cicero
Replacements:
HK	16	Carlo Festuccia
PR	17	Salvatore Perugini
PR	18	Lorenzo Cittadini
LK	19	Tommaso Reato
FL	20	Alessandro Zanni
FB	21	Andrea Marcato
WG	22	Ezio Galon
Coach:
Nick Mallett

2 February 2008
16:30

England	19–26	Wales
Try: Flood 23' c Con: Wilkinson (1/1); Pen: Wilkinson (3/4) 1', 11', 45'; Drop: Wilkinson (1/1) 17'	Report	Try: Byrne 67' c Phillips 70' c Con: Hook (2/2); Pen: Hook (4/4) 4', 34', 57', 63'

Twickenham Stadium, London
Attendance: 82,000
Referee: Craig Joubert (South Africa)

FB	15	Iain Balshaw
RW	14	Paul Sackey
OC	13	Mike Tindall
IC	12	Toby Flood
LW	11	David Strettle
FH	10	Jonny Wilkinson
SH	9	Andy Gomarsall
N8	8	Luke Narraway
OF	7	Lewis Moody
BF	6	James Haskell
RL	5	Steve Borthwick
LL	4	Simon Shaw
TP	3	Phil Vickery
HK	2	Mark Regan
LP	1	Andrew Sheridan
Replacements:
HK	16	Lee Mears
PR	17	Matt Stevens
LK	18	Ben Kay
FL	19	Tom Rees
SH	20	Richard Wigglesworth
FH	21	Danny Cipriani
WG	22	Lesley Vainikolo
Coach:
Brian Ashton

FB	15	Lee Byrne
RW	14	Mark Jones
OC	13	Sonny Parker
IC	12	Gavin Henson
LW	11	Shane Williams
FH	10	James Hook
SH	9	Mike Phillips
N8	8	Ryan Jones (c)
OF	7	Martyn Williams
BF	6	Jonathan Thomas
RL	5	Alun Wyn Jones
LL	4	Ian Gough
TP	3	Adam Jones
HK	2	Huw Bennett
LP	1	Duncan Jones
Replacements:
HK	16	Matthew Rees
PR	17	Gethin Jenkins
LK	18	Ian Evans
N8	19	Alix Popham
SH	20	Gareth Cooper
FH	21	Stephen Jones
CE	22	Tom Shanklin
Coach:
Warren Gatland

Notes

- This was Wales' first win over England at Twickenham Stadium for 20 years.

3 February 2008
15:00

Scotland	6–27	France
Pen: Parks (1/2) 30'; Drop: Parks (1/2) 4'	Report	Try: Clerc 12' c, 65' c Malzieu 23' c Con: Élissalde (2/2); Skrela(1/1); Pen: Traille (2/2) 18', 55'

Murrayfield Stadium, Edinburgh
Attendance: 67,800
Referee: Alain Rolland (Ireland) (Note: Rolland replaced original referee Paul Honiss, who was forced to return to New Zealand due to a serious family illness.)

FB	15	Rory Lamont
RW	14	Nikki Walker
OC	13	Nick De Luca
IC	12	Andrew Henderson
LW	11	Simon Webster
FH	10	Dan Parks
SH	9	Mike Blair
N8	8	Dave Callam
OF	7	John Barclay
BF	6	Jason White (c)
RL	5	Jim Hamilton
LL	4	Nathan Hines
TP	3	Euan Murray
HK	2	Ross Ford
LP	1	Allan Jacobsen
Replacements:
HK	16	Fergus Thomson
PR	17	Gavin Kerr
LK	18	Scott MacLeod
FL	19	Kelly Brown
SH	20	Chris Cusiter
WG	21	Chris Paterson
FB	22	Hugo Southwell
Coach:
Frank Hadden

FB	15	Cédric Heymans
RW	14	Vincent Clerc
OC	13	David Marty
IC	12	Damien Traille
LW	11	Julien Malzieu
FH	10	François Trinh-Duc
SH	9	Jean-Baptiste Élissalde
N8	8	Elvis Vermeulen
OF	7	Fulgence Ouedraogo
BF	6	Thierry Dusautoir
RL	5	Lionel Nallet
LL	4	Loïc Jacquet
TP	3	Julien Brugnaut
HK	2	William Servat
LP	1	Lionel Faure
Replacements:
HK	16	Dimitri Szarzewski
PR	17	Nicolas Mas
LK	18	Arnaud Méla
FL	19	Julien Bonnaire
SH	20	Morgan Parra
FH	21	David Skrela
CE	22	Aurélien Rougerie
Coach:
Marc Lièvremont

=== Round 2 ===
9 February 2008
14:00

Wales	30–15	Scotland
Try: S. Williams 13' c, 68' c Hook 46' c Con: Hook (2/2); S. Jones (1/1); Pen: Hook (1/1) 28'; S. Jones (2/2) 63', 71'	Report	Pen: Paterson (5/5) 10', 32', 42', 50', 55

Millennium Stadium, Cardiff
Attendance: 74,576
Referee: Bryce Lawrence (New Zealand)

FB	15	Lee Byrne
RW	14	Jamie Roberts
OC	13	Tom Shanklin
IC	12	Gavin Henson
LW	11	Shane Williams
FH	10	James Hook
SH	9	Mike Phillips
N8	8	Ryan Jones (c)
OF	7	Martyn Williams
BF	6	Jonathan Thomas
RL	5	Ian Evans
LL	4	Ian Gough
TP	3	Adam Jones
HK	2	Huw Bennett
LP	1	Duncan Jones
Replacements:
HK	16	Matthew Rees
PR	17	Gethin Jenkins
LK	18	Deiniol Jones
N8	19	Gareth Delve
SH	20	Dwayne Peel
FH	21	Stephen Jones
CE	22	Sonny Parker
Coach:
Warren Gatland

FB	15	Hugo Southwell
RW	14	Nikki Walker
OC	13	Nick De Luca
IC	12	Andrew Henderson
LW	11	Chris Paterson
FH	10	Dan Parks
SH	9	Mike Blair
N8	8	Kelly Brown
OF	7	John Barclay
BF	6	Jason White (c)
RL	5	Jim Hamilton
LL	4	Nathan Hines
TP	3	Euan Murray
HK	2	Ross Ford
LP	1	Allan Jacobsen
Replacements:
HK	16	Fergus Thomson
PR	17	Gavin Kerr
LK	18	Scott MacLeod
FL	19	Ally Hogg
SH	20	Chris Cusiter
CE	21	Graeme Morrison
WG	22	Simon Danielli
Coach:
Frank Hadden

9 February 2008
16:00

France	26–21	Ireland
Try: Clerc 14' c, 18' m, 35' c Heymans 48' c Con: Élissalde (3/4)	Report	Try: Penalty try 55' c D. Wallace 59' m Con: O'Gara (1/2); Pen: O'Gara (3/3) 17', 28', 74'

Stade de France, Saint-Denis
Attendance: 76,500
Referee: Nigel Owens (Wales)

FB	15	Cédric Heymans
RW	14	Aurélien Rougerie
OC	13	David Marty
IC	12	Damien Traille
LW	11	Vincent Clerc
FH	10	David Skrela
SH	9	Jean-Baptiste Élissalde
N8	8	Julien Bonnaire
OF	7	Fulgence Ouedraogo
BF	6	Thierry Dusautoir
RL	5	Arnaud Méla
LL	4	Lionel Nallet
TP	3	Nicolas Mas
HK	2	Dimitri Szarzewski
LP	1	Lionel Faure
Replacements:
HK	16	William Servat
PR	17	Julien Brugnaut
LK	18	Loïc Jacquet
N8	19	Louis Picamoles
SH	20	Morgan Parra
FH	21	François Trinh-Duc
CE	22	Anthony Floch
Coach:
Marc Lièvremont

FB	15	Girvan Dempsey
RW	14	Geordan Murphy
OC	13	Brian O'Driscoll
IC	12	Andrew Trimble
LW	11	Rob Kearney
FH	10	Ronan O'Gara
SH	9	Eoin Reddan
N8	8	Jamie Heaslip
OF	7	David Wallace
BF	6	Denis Leamy
RL	5	Malcolm O'Kelly
LL	4	Donncha O'Callaghan
TP	3	John Hayes
HK	2	Bernard Jackman
LP	1	Marcus Horan
Replacements:
HK	16	Rory Best
PR	17	Tony Buckley
LK	18	Mick O'Driscoll
FL	19	Simon Easterby
SH	20	Peter Stringer
FH	21	Paddy Wallace
WG	22	Shane Horgan
Coach:
Eddie O'Sullivan

10 February 2008
14:30

Italy	19–23	England
Try: Picone 76' c Con: Bortolussi (1/1); Pen: Bortolussi (4/4) 5', 11', 44', 54'	Report	Try: Sackey 3' c Flood 15' c Con: Wilkinson (2/2); Pen: Wilkinson (3/4) 31', 37', 57'

Stadio Flaminio, Rome
Attendance: 30,625
Referee: Alain Rolland (Ireland)

FB	15	David Bortolussi
RW	14	Kaine Robertson
OC	13	Gonzalo Canale
IC	12	Mirco Bergamasco
LW	11	Ezio Galon
FH	10	Andrea Masi
SH	9	Pietro Travagli
N8	8	Sergio Parisse (c)
OF	7	Mauro Bergamasco
BF	6	Josh Sole
RL	5	Carlo Del Fava
LL	4	Santiago Dellapè
TP	3	Martín Castrogiovanni
HK	2	Leonardo Ghiraldini
LP	1	Andrea Lo Cicero
Replacements:
HK	16	Carlo Festuccia
PR	17	Salvatore Perugini
PR	18	Carlos Nieto
LK	19	Alessandro Zanni
SH	20	Simon Picone
FB	21	Andrea Marcato
WG	22	Alberto Sgarbi
Coach:
Nick Mallett

FB	15	Iain Balshaw
RW	14	Paul Sackey
OC	13	Jamie Noon
IC	12	Toby Flood
LW	11	Lesley Vainikolo
FH	10	Jonny Wilkinson
SH	9	Andy Gomarsall
N8	8	Nick Easter
OF	7	Michael Lipman
BF	6	James Haskell
RL	5	Steve Borthwick
LL	4	Simon Shaw
TP	3	Matt Stevens
HK	2	Mark Regan
LP	1	Tim Payne
Replacements:
HK	16	Lee Mears
PR	17	Jason Hobson
LK	18	Ben Kay
N8	19	Luke Narraway
SH	20	Richard Wigglesworth
FH	21	Danny Cipriani
CE	22	Mathew Tait
Coach:
Brian Ashton

=== Round 3 ===
23 February 2008
15:00

Wales	47–8	Italy
Try: Byrne 28' c, 68' c Shanklin 42' c S. Williams 57' c, 74' c Con: S. Jones (3/3); Hook (2/2); Pen: S. Jones (4/4) 4', 11', 47', 50'	Report	Try: Castrogiovanni 12' m Pen: Marcato (1/2) 40+2'

Millennium Stadium, Cardiff
Attendance: 74,305
Referee: Dave Pearson (England)

FB	15	Lee Byrne
RW	14	Mark Jones
OC	13	Tom Shanklin
IC	12	Gavin Henson
LW	11	Shane Williams
FH	10	Stephen Jones
SH	9	Dwayne Peel
N8	8	Ryan Jones (c)
OF	7	Martyn Williams
BF	6	Jonathan Thomas
RL	5	Ian Evans
LL	4	Ian Gough
TP	3	Rhys M. Thomas
HK	2	Matthew Rees
LP	1	Gethin Jenkins
Replacements:
HK	16	Huw Bennett
PR	17	Duncan Jones
LK	18	Deiniol Jones
N8	19	Gareth Delve
SH	20	Mike Phillips
FH	21	James Hook
CE	22	Sonny Parker
Coach:
Warren Gatland

FB	15	Andrea Marcato
RW	14	Alberto Sgarbi
OC	13	Gonzalo Canale
IC	12	Mirco Bergamasco
LW	11	Ezio Galon
FH	10	Andrea Masi
SH	9	Simon Picone
N8	8	Sergio Parisse (c)
OF	7	Mauro Bergamasco
BF	6	Josh Sole
RL	5	Carlo Del Fava
LL	4	Santiago Dellapè
TP	3	Martín Castrogiovanni
HK	2	Leonardo Ghiraldini
LP	1	Salvatore Perugini
Replacements:
HK	16	Carlo Festuccia
PR	17	Andrea Lo Cicero
LK	18	Marco Bortolami
FL	19	Alessandro Zanni
SH	20	Pietro Travagli
FH	21	Paolo Buso
CE	22	Enrico Patrizio
Coach:
Nick Mallett

23 February 2008
17:00

Ireland	34–13	Scotland
Try: D. Wallace 22' c Kearney 26' c Horan 41' m Bowe 62' c, 79' m Con: O'Gara (3/5); Pen: O'Gara (1/1) 50'	Report	Try: Webster 53' c Con: Paterson (1/1); Pen: Paterson (2/2) 24', 31'

Croke Park, Dublin
Attendance: 74,234
Referee: Christophe Berdos (France)

FB	15	Geordan Murphy
RW	14	Tommy Bowe
OC	13	Brian O'Driscoll
IC	12	Andrew Trimble
LW	11	Rob Kearney
FH	10	Ronan O'Gara
SH	9	Eoin Reddan
N8	8	Jamie Heaslip
OF	7	David Wallace
BF	6	Denis Leamy
RL	5	Mick O'Driscoll
LL	4	Donncha O'Callaghan
TP	3	John Hayes
HK	2	Bernard Jackman
LP	1	Marcus Horan
Replacements:
HK	16	Rory Best
PR	17	Tony Buckley
LK	18	Paul O'Connell
FL	19	Simon Easterby
SH	20	Peter Stringer
FH	21	Paddy Wallace
WG	22	Shane Horgan
Coach:
Eddie O'Sullivan

FB	15	Hugo Southwell
RW	14	Rory Lamont
OC	13	Simon Webster
IC	12	Andrew Henderson
LW	11	Nikki Walker
FH	10	Chris Paterson
SH	9	Mike Blair (c)
N8	8	Kelly Brown
OF	7	Ally Hogg
BF	6	Alasdair Strokosch
RL	5	Scott MacLeod
LL	4	Nathan Hines
TP	3	Euan Murray
HK	2	Ross Ford
LP	1	Allan Jacobsen
Replacements:
HK	16	Fergus Thomson
PR	17	Gavin Kerr
LK	18	Jim Hamilton
FL	19	Ross Rennie
SH	20	Chris Cusiter
FH	21	Dan Parks
CE	22	Nick De Luca
Coach:
Frank Hadden

Notes

- Ireland won the Centenary Quaich.

23 February 2008
20:00

France	13–24	England
Try: Nallet 24' c Con: Traille(1/1); Pen: Parra (1/1) 49'; Yachvili (1/1) 74'	Report	Try: Sackey 5' c Wigglesworth 79' m Con: Wilkinson (1/2); Pen: Wilkinson (3/5) 14', 29', 68'; Drop: Wilkinson (1/2) 64'

Stade de France, Saint-Denis
Attendance: 79,593
Referee: Steve Walsh (New Zealand)

FB	15	Cédric Heymans
RW	14	Aurélien Rougerie
OC	13	David Marty
IC	12	Damien Traille
LW	11	Vincent Clerc
FH	10	François Trinh-Duc
SH	9	Morgan Parra
N8	8	Louis Picamoles
OF	7	Thierry Dusautoir
BF	6	Julien Bonnaire
RL	5	Lionel Nallet
LL	4	Pascal Papé
TP	3	Nicolas Mas
HK	2	Dimitri Szarzewski
LP	1	Lionel Faure
Replacements:
HK	16	William Servat
PR	17	Jean-Baptiste Poux
LK	18	Jérôme Thion
FL	19	Fulgence Ouedraogo
SH	20	Dimitri Yachvili
FH	21	David Skrela
FB	22	Anthony Floch
Coach:
Marc Lièvremont

FB	15	Iain Balshaw
RW	14	Paul Sackey
OC	13	Jamie Noon
IC	12	Toby Flood
LW	11	Lesley Vainikolo
FH	10	Jonny Wilkinson
SH	9	Richard Wigglesworth
N8	8	Nick Easter
OF	7	Michael Lipman
BF	6	James Haskell
RL	5	Steve Borthwick
LL	4	Simon Shaw
TP	3	Phil Vickery
HK	2	Mark Regan
LP	1	Andrew Sheridan
Replacements:
HK	16	Lee Mears
PR	17	Matt Stevens
LK	18	Ben Kay
FL	19	Tom Croft
SH	20	Paul Hodgson
FH	21	Danny Cipriani
CE	22	Mathew Tait
Coach:
Brian Ashton

Notes:

- Jonny Wilkinson drew level with Wales' Neil Jenkins as the all-time leading point scorer in international rugby history with 1,090 career points (including points scored for the British and Irish Lions).
- This result left Wales as the only remaining team that could win the Grand Slam.
- This was England's first away win over France in the Six Nations since their 15–9 win in 2000.

=== Round 4 ===
8 March 2008
13:15

Ireland	12–16	Wales
Pen: O'Gara (4/4) 5', 19', 62', 68'	Report	Try: S. Williams 51' c Con: S. Jones (1/1); Pen: S. Jones (2/4) 26', 46'; Hook (1/1) 76'

Croke Park, Dublin
Attendance: 75,000
Referee: Wayne Barnes (England)

FB	15	Rob Kearney
RW	14	Shane Horgan
OC	13	Brian O'Driscoll (c)
IC	12	Andrew Trimble
LW	11	Tommy Bowe
FH	10	Ronan O'Gara
SH	9	Eoin Reddan
N8	8	Jamie Heaslip
OF	7	David Wallace
BF	6	Denis Leamy
RL	5	Paul O'Connell
LL	4	Donncha O'Callaghan
TP	3	John Hayes
HK	2	Rory Best
LP	1	Marcus Horan
Replacements:
HK	16	Bernard Jackman
PR	17	Tony Buckley
LK	18	Mick O'Driscoll
FL	19	Simon Easterby
SH	20	Peter Stringer
FH	21	Paddy Wallace
CE	22	Luke Fitzgerald
Coach:
Eddie O'Sullivan

FB	15	Lee Byrne
RW	14	Mark Jones
OC	13	Tom Shanklin
IC	12	Gavin Henson
LW	11	Shane Williams
FH	10	Stephen Jones
SH	9	Mike Phillips
N8	8	Ryan Jones (c)
OF	7	Martyn Williams
BF	6	Jonathan Thomas
RL	5	Alun Wyn Jones
LL	4	Ian Gough
TP	3	Adam Jones
HK	2	Matthew Rees
LP	1	Gethin Jenkins
Replacements:
HK	16	Gareth Williams
PR	17	Duncan Jones
LK	18	Ian Evans
N8	19	Gareth Delve
SH	20	Dwayne Peel
FH	21	James Hook
CE	22	Sonny Parker
Coach:
Warren Gatland

Notes:

- Shane Williams scored his 40th international try for Wales, drawing him level with Gareth Thomas as Wales' all-time top try scorer.
- Wales won the Triple Crown.

8 March 2008
15:15

Scotland	15–9	England
Pen: Paterson (4/4) 9', 31', 40+2', 41'; Parks (1/1) 48'	Report	Pen: Wilkinson (3/5) 27', 50', 53'

Murrayfield Stadium, Edinburgh
Attendance: 67,987
Referee: Jonathan Kaplan (South Africa)

FB	15	Hugo Southwell
RW	14	Rory Lamont
OC	13	Simon Webster
IC	12	Graeme Morrison
LW	11	Nikki Walker
FH	10	Chris Paterson
SH	9	Mike Blair (c)
N8	8	Simon Taylor
OF	7	Ally Hogg
BF	6	Alasdair Strokosch
RL	5	Scott MacLeod
LL	4	Nathan Hines
TP	3	Euan Murray
HK	2	Ross Ford
LP	1	Allan Jacobsen
Replacements:
HK	16	Fergus Thomson
PR	17	Alasdair Dickinson
PR	18	Craig Smith
FL	19	Jason White
FL	20	Kelly Brown
SH	21	Rory Lawson
FH	22	Dan Parks
Coach:
Frank Hadden

FB	15	Iain Balshaw
RW	14	Paul Sackey
OC	13	Jamie Noon
IC	12	Toby Flood
LW	11	Lesley Vainikolo
FH	10	Jonny Wilkinson
SH	9	Richard Wigglesworth
N8	8	Nick Easter
OF	7	Michael Lipman
BF	6	Tom Croft
RL	5	Steve Borthwick
LL	4	Simon Shaw
TP	3	Phil Vickery (c)
HK	2	Lee Mears
LP	1	Andrew Sheridan
Replacements:
HK	16	George Chuter
PR	17	Matt Stevens
LK	18	Ben Kay
N8	19	Luke Narraway
SH	20	Paul Hodgson
CE	21	Mathew Tait
FH	22	Charlie Hodgson
Coach:
Brian Ashton

Notes

- England's Jonny Wilkinson became the all-time scoring leader in international rugby history, surpassing Wales' Neil Jenkins.
- Scotland won the Calcutta Cup.

9 March 2008
15:00

France	25–13	Italy
Try: Floch 13' c Jauzion 53' m Rougerie 66' c Con: Yachvili (2/3); Pen: Yachvili (2/2) 27', 37'	Report	Try: Castrogiovanni 58' c Con: Marcato (1/1); Pen: Marcato (2/2) 18', 31'

Stade de France, Saint-Denis
Attendance: 79,000
Referee: Alan Lewis (Ireland)

FB	15	Anthony Floch
RW	14	Aurélien Rougerie
OC	13	Yann David
IC	12	Yannick Jauzion
LW	11	Julien Malzieu
FH	10	François Trinh-Duc
SH	9	Dimitri Yachvili
N8	8	Louis Picamoles
OF	7	Ibrahim Diarra
BF	6	Fulgence Ouedraogo
RL	5	Jérôme Thion
LL	4	Lionel Nallet
TP	3	Nicolas Mas
HK	2	Dimitri Szarzewski
LP	1	Fabien Barcella
Replacements:
HK	16	Guilhem Guirado
PR	17	Jean-Baptiste Poux
LK	18	Arnaud Méla
FL	19	Julien Bonnaire
SH	20	Julien Tomas
CE	21	Damien Traille
WG	22	Vincent Clerc
Coach:
Marc Lièvremont

FB	15	Andrea Marcato
RW	14	Kaine Robertson
OC	13	Gonzalo Canale
IC	12	Mirco Bergamasco
LW	11	Ezio Galon
FH	10	Andrea Masi
SH	9	Simon Picone
N8	8	Sergio Parisse (c)
OF	7	Alessandro Zanni
BF	6	Josh Sole
RL	5	Marco Bortolami
LL	4	Carlo Del Fava
TP	3	Martín Castrogiovanni
HK	2	Leonardo Ghiraldini
LP	1	Andrea Lo Cicero
Replacements:
HK	16	Fabio Ongaro
PR	17	Salvatore Perugini
PR	18	Carlos Nieto
N8	19	Jaco Erasmus
SH	20	Pietro Travagli
CE	21	Enrico Patrizio
WG	22	Alberto Sgarbi
Coach:
Nick Mallett

Notes

- France won their second consecutive Giuseppe Garibaldi Trophy.

=== Round 5 ===
15 March 2008
13:00

Italy	23–20	Scotland
Try: Penalty try 13' c Canale 59' c Con: Marcato (2/2); Pen: Marcato (2/4) 36', 68'; Drop: Marcato (1/1) 79'	Report	Try: Hogg 21' c Blair 40' c Con: Paterson (2/2); Pen: Parks (1/1) 25'; Paterson (1/1) 72'

Stadio Flaminio, Rome
Attendance: 40,000
Referee: Nigel Owens (Wales)

FB	15	Andrea Marcato
RW	14	Kaine Robertson
OC	13	Gonzalo Canale
IC	12	Mirco Bergamasco
LW	11	Ezio Galon
FH	10	Andrea Masi
SH	9	Simon Picone
N8	8	Sergio Parisse (c)
OF	7	Alessandro Zanni
BF	6	Josh Sole
RL	5	Marco Bortolami
LL	4	Carlo Del Fava
TP	3	Martín Castrogiovanni
HK	2	Leonardo Ghiraldini
LP	1	Andrea Lo Cicero
Replacements:
HK	16	Fabio Ongaro
PR	17	Salvatore Perugini
PR	18	Carlos Nieto
N8	19	Jaco Erasmus
SH	20	Pietro Travagli
CE	21	Enrico Patrizio
WG	22	Alberto Sgarbi
Coach:
Nick Mallett

FB	15	Hugo Southwell
RW	14	Simon Danielli
OC	13	Simon Webster
IC	12	Graeme Morrison
LW	11	Chris Paterson
FH	10	Dan Parks
SH	9	Mike Blair (c)
N8	8	Simon Taylor
OF	7	Ally Hogg
BF	6	Alasdair Strokosch
RL	5	Scott MacLeod
LL	4	Nathan Hines
TP	3	Euan Murray
HK	2	Fergus Thomson
LP	1	Allan Jacobsen
Replacements:
HK	16	Scott Lawson
PR	17	Alasdair Dickinson
PR	18	Craig Smith
FL	19	Jason White
FL	20	Kelly Brown
SH	21	Rory Lawson
CE	22	Andrew Henderson
Coach:
Frank Hadden

Notes

- Despite victory over Scotland, Italy won the "wooden spoon", having failed to win by the necessary five-point margin required to avoid finishing at the bottom of the table.

15 March 2008
15:00

England	33–10	Ireland
Try: Sackey 19' c Tait 57' c Noon 69' c Con: Cipriani (3/3); Pen: Cipriani (4/4) 12', 30', 44', 73'	Report	Try: Kearney 4' c Con: O'Gara (1/1); Pen: O'Gara (1/2) 7'

Twickenham Stadium, London
Attendance: 82,000
Referee: Stuart Dickinson (Australia)

FB	15	Iain Balshaw
RW	14	Paul Sackey
OC	13	Jamie Noon
IC	12	Toby Flood
LW	11	Lesley Vainikolo
FH	10	Danny Cipriani
SH	9	Richard Wigglesworth
N8	8	Nick Easter
OF	7	Michael Lipman
BF	6	Tom Croft
RL	5	Steve Borthwick
LL	4	Simon Shaw
TP	3	Phil Vickery
HK	2	Lee Mears
LP	1	Andrew Sheridan
Replacements:
HK	16	George Chuter
PR	17	Matt Stevens
LK	18	Ben Kay
FL	19	James Haskell
SH	20	Paul Hodgson
FH	21	Jonny Wilkinson
CE	22	Mathew Tait
Coach:
Brian Ashton

FB	15	Geordan Murphy
RW	14	Tommy Bowe
OC	13	Andrew Trimble
IC	12	Shane Horgan
LW	11	Rob Kearney
FH	10	Ronan O'Gara (c)
SH	9	Eoin Reddan
N8	8	Jamie Heaslip
OF	7	David Wallace
BF	6	Denis Leamy
RL	5	Paul O'Connell
LL	4	Donncha O'Callaghan
TP	3	John Hayes
HK	2	Rory Best
LP	1	Marcus Horan
Replacements:
HK	16	Bernard Jackman
PR	17	Tony Buckley
LK	18	Mick O'Driscoll
FL	19	Simon Easterby
SH	20	Peter Stringer
FH	21	Paddy Wallace
WG	22	Luke Fitzgerald
Coach:
Eddie O'Sullivan

Notes

- England won the Millennium Trophy for the first time in five years.

15 March 2008
17:00

Wales	29–12	France
Try: S. Williams 60' c M. Williams 77' c Con: S. Jones (2/2); Pen: Hook (3/5) 5', 18', 21'; S. Jones (2/2) 63', 74'	Report	Pen: Élissalde (3/3) 19', 39', 46'; Yachvili (1/1) 69'

Millennium Stadium, Cardiff
Attendance: 74,609
Referee: Marius Jonker (South Africa)

FB	15	Lee Byrne
RW	14	Mark Jones
OC	13	Tom Shanklin
IC	12	Gavin Henson
LW	11	Shane Williams
FH	10	James Hook
SH	9	Mike Phillips
N8	8	Ryan Jones (c)
OF	7	Martyn Williams
BF	6	Jonathan Thomas
RL	5	Alun Wyn Jones
LL	4	Ian Gough
TP	3	Adam Jones
HK	2	Huw Bennett
LP	1	Gethin Jenkins
Replacements:
HK	16	Matthew Rees
PR	17	Duncan Jones
LK	18	Ian Evans
N8	19	Gareth Delve
SH	20	Dwayne Peel
FH	21	Stephen Jones
CE	22	Sonny Parker
Coach:
Warren Gatland

FB	15	Anthony Floch
RW	14	Vincent Clerc
OC	13	Yannick Jauzion
IC	12	Damien Traille
LW	11	Julien Malzieu
FH	10	David Skrela
SH	9	Jean-Baptiste Élissalde
N8	8	Julien Bonnaire
OF	7	Fulgence Ouedraogo
BF	6	Thierry Dusautoir
RL	5	Jérôme Thion
LL	4	Lionel Nallet (c)
TP	3	Nicolas Mas
HK	2	Dimitri Szarzewski
LP	1	Fabien Barcella
Replacements:
HK	16	William Servat
PR	17	Jean-Baptiste Poux
LK	18	Arnaud Méla
N8	19	Elvis Vermeulen
SH	20	Dimitri Yachvili
FH	21	François Trinh-Duc
FB	22	Cédric Heymans
Coach:
Marc Lièvremont

Notes

- Shane Williams took sole possession of the all-time try scoring lead for Wales with his 41st try.
- Wales won the Grand Slam for the second time in four championships.
- By virtue of Wales beating France by more than three points, England finished second in the table, their best Six Nations finish since 2003.
- Wales conceded just two tries all championship, the tightest ever defence in the Six Nations.

== Scorers ==
Leading try scorers
Tries	Name	Pld	Team
6	Shane Williams	5	Wales
5	Vincent Clerc	5	France
3	Lee Byrne	5	Wales
3	Martin Castrogiovanni	5	Italy
3	Paul Sackey	5	England
2	Tommy Bowe	3	Ireland
2	Toby Flood	5	England
2	Rob Kearney	5	Ireland
2	David Wallace	5	Ireland
1	13 players		

Leading point scorers
Points	Name	Pld	Team
50	Jonny Wilkinson	5	England
48	Ronan O'Gara	5	Ireland
44	Stephen Jones	4	Wales
44	James Hook	5	Wales
