= 2011 Rugby World Cup final =

Rugby competition in Auckland, New Zealand

2011 Rugby World Cup Final
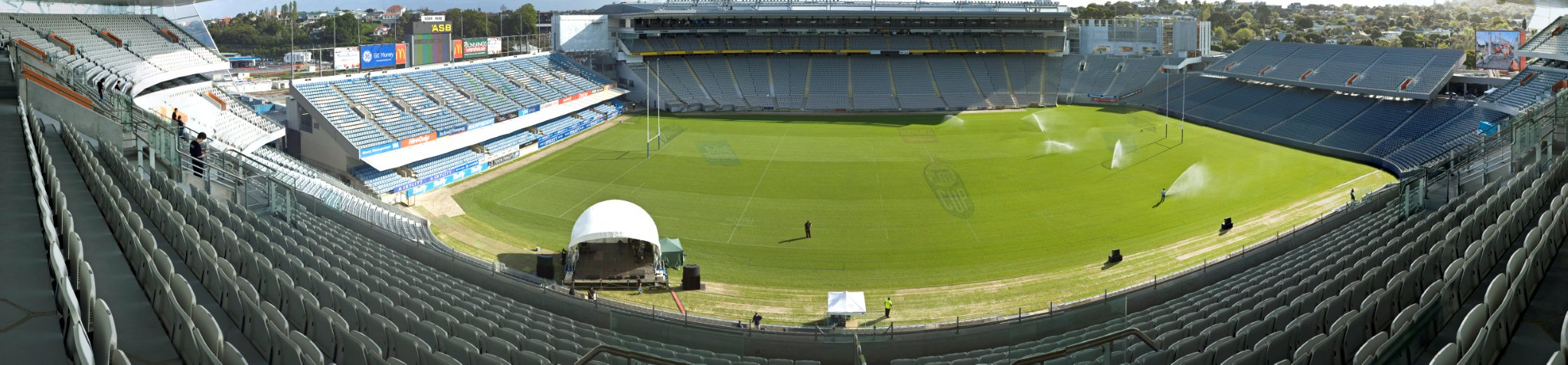
- Event: 2011 Rugby World Cup
| France | New Zealand |
| 7 | 8 |
- Date: 23 October 2011
- Venue: Eden Park, Auckland
- Man of the Match: Thierry Dusautoir (France)
- Referee: Craig Joubert (South Africa)
- Attendance: 61,079

The 2011 Rugby World Cup final was a rugby union match between France and New Zealand, to determine the winner of the 2011 Rugby World Cup. The match took place on 23 October 2011 at Eden Park, in Auckland, New Zealand. New Zealand won the match 8–7.

New Zealand were favourites, as they went into the final unbeaten and the French had lost two pool games, including one to New Zealand. The French team also experienced a player revolt against their coach Marc Lièvremont, confirmed after the tournament by veteran back-rower Imanol Harinordoquy. The match was a close-fought and tight contest with few line-breaks. Each side scored one try and the outcome was determined by kicks – the All Blacks kicked a penalty goal while the French managed only the conversion of their try. The result was the lowest score of any World Cup final.

The match echoed the 1987 Rugby World Cup Final which was also held at Eden Park between the same teams. As in the 2007 final, both teams had progressed from the same pool.

New Zealand's victory marked the first time that a nation had held both the men's World Cup and Women's Rugby World Cup, as the Black Ferns had won the 2010 tournament.

== Path to the final ==
France
Round
New Zealand
Opponent
Result
Pool stage
Opponent
Result
Japan
47–21
Match 1
Tonga
41–10
Canada
46–19
Match 2
Japan
83–7
New Zealand
17–37
Match 3
France
37–17
Tonga
14–19
Match 4
Canada
79–15

| Team | Pld | W | D | L | TF | PF | PA | +/− | BP | Pts |
|---|---|---|---|---|---|---|---|---|---|---|
| New Zealand | 4 | 4 | 0 | 0 | 36 | 240 | 49 | +191 | 4 | 20 |
| France | 4 | 2 | 0 | 2 | 13 | 124 | 96 | +28 | 3 | 11 |
| Tonga | 4 | 2 | 0 | 2 | 7 | 80 | 98 | −18 | 1 | 9 |
| Canada | 4 | 1 | 1 | 2 | 9 | 82 | 168 | −86 | 0 | 6 |
| Japan | 4 | 0 | 1 | 3 | 8 | 69 | 184 | −115 | 0 | 2 |

Final standing

| Team | Pld | W | D | L | TF | PF | PA | +/− | BP | Pts |
|---|---|---|---|---|---|---|---|---|---|---|
| New Zealand | 4 | 4 | 0 | 0 | 36 | 240 | 49 | +191 | 4 | 20 |
| France | 4 | 2 | 0 | 2 | 13 | 124 | 96 | +28 | 3 | 11 |
| Tonga | 4 | 2 | 0 | 2 | 7 | 80 | 98 | −18 | 1 | 9 |
| Canada | 4 | 1 | 1 | 2 | 9 | 82 | 168 | −86 | 0 | 6 |
| Japan | 4 | 0 | 1 | 3 | 8 | 69 | 184 | −115 | 0 | 2 |

Opponent
Result
Knockout stage
Opponent
Result
England
19–12
Quarter-finals
Argentina
33–10
Wales
9–8
Semi-finals
Australia
20–6

== Match summary ==
=== Choice of colours ===
France won the toss for choice of colours ahead of the final at Eden Park, but agreed to play in their white change kit to allow New Zealand to play in their traditional all-black kit.

=== Haka and French response ===
After the national anthems, the New Zealand players performed the Kapa o Pango haka as the French team stared back and then advanced towards them in a V-shaped formation before fanning out into a straight line. The French had decided to meet the haka in this fashion on Sunday morning, and French captain Thierry Dusautoir stated that "it was a great moment". They were later fined £2,500 by the IRB for crossing the half-way line, a decision that was labeled "pedantic" and the "final insult".

=== First half ===
In a match of "grim physical attrition", New Zealand scored first. From a line-out in the French 22, Tony Woodcock received the ball and broke through a hole in the French defence to score his first try of the World Cup. Piri Weepu, who had already missed a penalty kick, failed with his conversion effort. Weepu missed another attempt in the 25th minute. Nine minutes later, New Zealand's Aaron Cruden, the team's third choice fly-half, only playing due to injuries to Dan Carter and Colin Slade, hyper-extended his knee, and was replaced by Stephen Donald. The French were forced to defend stoically for much of the first half, due to New Zealand playing a good running game, but late in the half François Trinh-Duc missed a drop goal attempt and had a run to the line cut off by Weepu.

=== Second half ===
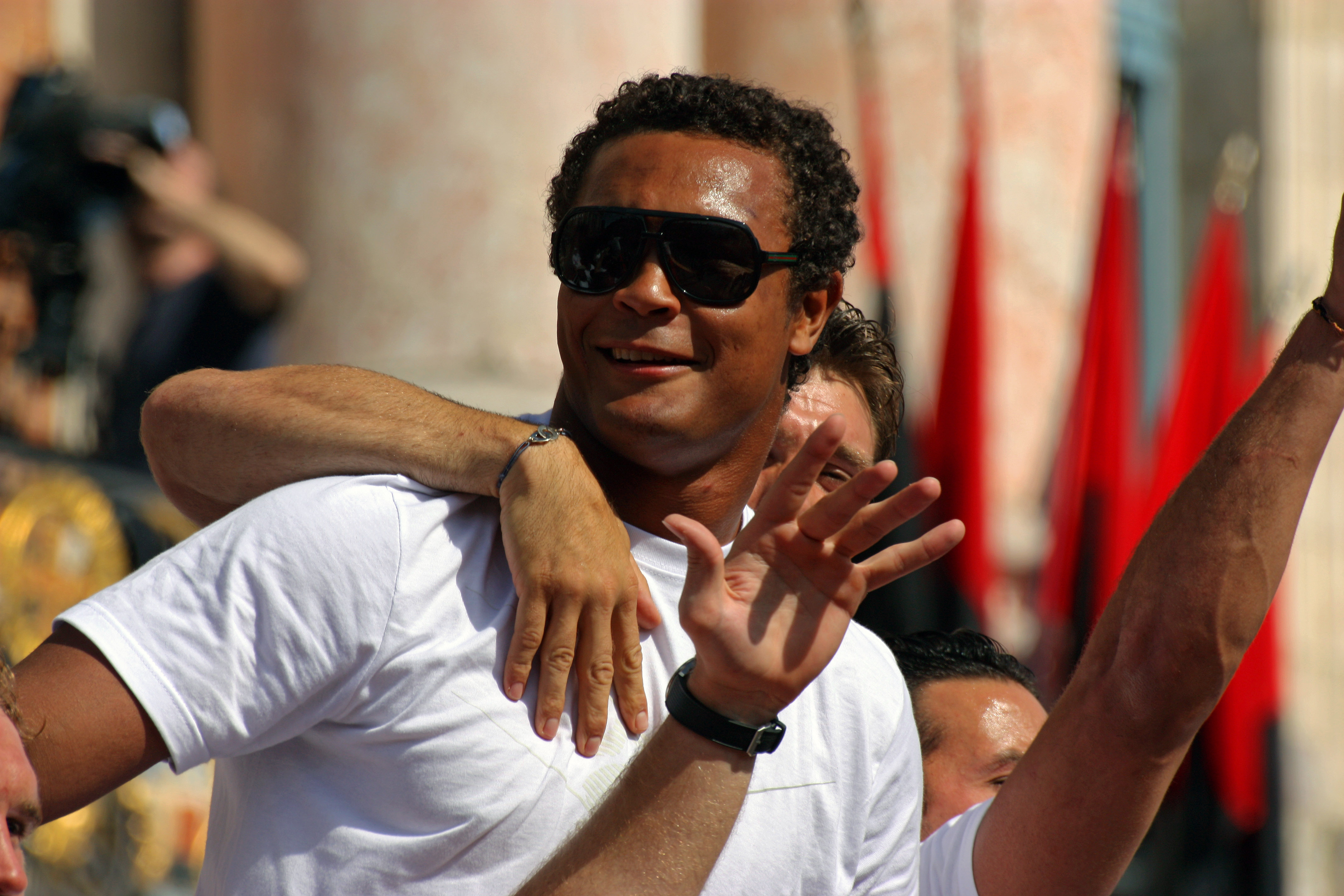
French captain Thierry Dusautoir was named man of the match.

France came back into the game in the second half, although it did not begin well for them: Dimitri Yachvili missed the team's first penalty attempt after two minutes, and Stephen Donald pushed New Zealand further into the lead by successfully kicking a penalty two minutes later. France reacted straight away: Trinh-Duc made a run towards the line, and after several attempts, Dusautoir scored a try, which Trinh-Duc converted to take the score to 8–7. Trinh-Duc attempted a penalty kick from 48 metres in the 65th minute, but missed, and thereafter there were few chances for either side. The French captain, Dusautoir, who was described as "enjoying a heroic game in defence" by The Daily Telegraph's Brendan Gallagher, was named man of the match.

Jean-Marc Doussain came on as a late substitute for France, and became the first player ever to make his test debut in a Rugby World Cup Final.

== Match details ==
23 October 2011
21:00 NZDT (UTC+13)

| France | 7–8 | New Zealand |
| Try: Dusautoir 47' c Con: Trinh-Duc (1/1) | Report | Try: Woodcock 15' m Pen: Donald (1/1) 46' |

Eden Park, Auckland
Attendance: 61,079
Referee: Craig Joubert (South Africa)

| France | New Zealand |

| FB | 15 | Maxime Médard |
| RW | 14 | Vincent Clerc | (substituted off) 46' |
| OC | 13 | Aurélien Rougerie |
| IC | 12 | Maxime Mermoz |
| LW | 11 | Alexis Palisson |
| FH | 10 | Morgan Parra | 12' to 18' | | (substituted off) 23' |
| SH | 9 | Dimitri Yachvili | (substituted off) 76' |
| N8 | 8 | Imanol Harinordoquy |
| BF | 7 | Julien Bonnaire |
| OF | 6 | Thierry Dusautoir (c) |
| RL | 5 | Lionel Nallet |
| LL | 4 | Pascal Papé | (substituted off) 70' |
| TP | 3 | Nicolas Mas |
| HK | 2 | William Servat | (substituted off) 65' |
| LP | 1 | Jean-Baptiste Poux | (substituted off) 65' |
Replacements:
| HK | 16 | Dimitri Szarzewski | (substituted on) 65' |
| PR | 17 | Fabien Barcella | (substituted on) 65' |
| LK | 18 | Julien Pierre | (substituted on) 70' |
| FL | 19 | Fulgence Ouedraogo |
| SH | 20 | Jean-Marc Doussain | (substituted on) 76' |
| FH | 21 | François Trinh-Duc | (substituted on) 12' | (substituted off) 18' | (substituted on) 23' |
| FB | 22 | Damien Traille | (substituted on) 46' |
Coach:
(France) Marc Lièvremont

| FB | 15 | Israel Dagg |
| RW | 14 | Cory Jane |
| OC | 13 | Conrad Smith |
| IC | 12 | Ma'a Nonu | (substituted off) 76' |
| LW | 11 | Richard Kahui |
| FH | 10 | Aaron Cruden | (substituted off) 34' |
| SH | 9 | Piri Weepu | (substituted off) 50' |
| N8 | 8 | Kieran Read |
| OF | 7 | Richie McCaw (c) |
| BF | 6 | Jerome Kaino |
| RL | 5 | Sam Whitelock | (substituted off) 49' |
| LL | 4 | Brad Thorn |
| TP | 3 | Owen Franks |
| HK | 2 | Keven Mealamu | (substituted off) 49' |
| LP | 1 | Tony Woodcock |
Replacements:
| HK | 16 | Andrew Hore | (substituted on) 49' |
| PR | 17 | Ben Franks |
| LK | 18 | Ali Williams | (substituted on) 49' |
| FL | 19 | Adam Thomson |
| SH | 20 | Andy Ellis | (substituted on) 50' |
| FH | 21 | Stephen Donald | (substituted on) 34' |
| CE | 22 | Sonny Bill Williams | (substituted on) 76' |
Coach:
(New Zealand) Graham Henry

Man of the Match:
Thierry Dusautoir (France)

Touch judges:
Alain Rolland (Ireland)
Nigel Owens (Wales)
Television match official:
Giulio de Santis (Italy)

== Statistics ==
| | New Zealand | France |
|---|---|---|
| Tries | 1 | 1 |
| Conversions | 0 | 1 |
| Penalties (attempts) | 1(3) | 0(2) |
| Drop goals (attempts) | 0(0) | 0(1) |
| Scrums (won/lost) | (7/0) | (6/0) |
| Line-outs (won/lost) | (14/2) | (15/2) |
| Turnovers | 3 | 4 |
| Tackles (made/attempts) | (111/120) | (87/97) |
| Line breaks | 2 | 2 |
| Possession | 45% | 55% |
| Territory | 45% | 55% |
| Time in opp. 22 | 4'34" | 6'35" |
| Errors (hands/kicks/restart) | (3/2/1) | (7/3/0) |
| Possession kicked (in play/touch/errors) | 1 | 2 |
| Penalties conceded | 7 | 10 |
| Replacements | 5 | 7 |
| Yellow cards | 0 | 0 |
| Red cards | 0 | 0 |
Reference: IRB

== Refereeing controversy ==
Craig Joubert's refereeing was heavily criticised by the French team and many international observers. Greg Growden writing for The Sydney Morning Herald accused Joubert of "ignoring offside play and breakdown indiscretions that should have cost the home team penalties". Hugh Farrelly interviewed in The Irish Independent stated laconically that "France were significantly better over 80 minutes" and "Craig Joubert did not referee evenly" and "some of the decisions were disgraceful for a game of this magnitude". On the other hand, former French referee Joël Jutge reviewed 24 instances of the game and concluded 17 times Joubert made the correct decisions, four incorrect decisions favoured the All Blacks and three incorrect decisions favoured the French.

Richie McCaw and New Zealand coach Graham Henry pointed out that New Zealand had deliberately tried to play the game in a way that did not result in them conceding penalties, especially in the second half. After the game McCaw expressed surprise that Aurélien Rougerie was not cited by the IRB for gouging at his eyes and noted that the final became "filthy" as it went on but made no mention of Joubert or his performance.

== Dramatisation ==
In July 2013, it was announced that a made-for-TV movie, to be called "The Kick", would be made. The telemovie focused on Stephen Donald, and his successful penalty kick early in the second half that ultimately provided the winning points. Donald had been unwanted for the All Blacks squad prior to the final, due to some previous poor international performances. However, injuries to Carter, Slade (both earlier in the tournament), Cruden and Weepu led to the opportunity for a "charming story of redemption". David de Lautour was cast as Donald. The movie debuted on New Zealand television on 10 August 2014.

== See also ==
- List of Rugby World Cup finals
