= Fulgence Ouedraogo =

French rugby union player (born 1986)

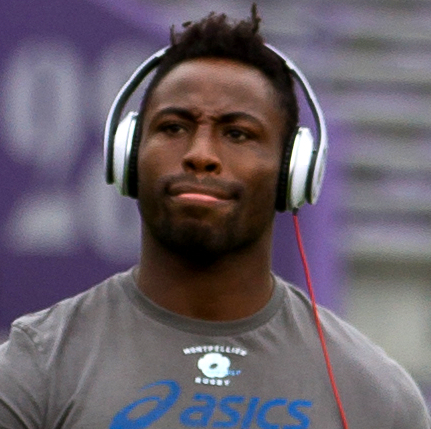
- Ouedraogo in 2012
- Born: Fulgence Ouedraogo; 21 July 1986 (age 40) Ouagadougou, Burkina Faso
- Height: 6 ft 1.5 in (1.87 m)
- Weight: 15 st 4 lb (98 kg)

Rugby union career
- Position: Flanker
Senior career
Years	Team	Apps	(Points)
2005–2022	Montpellier	340	(105)
International career
Years	Team	Apps	(Points)
2007–2015	France	39	(10)

Fulgence Ouedraogo (born 21 July 1986) is a former French rugby union player. He played the entirety of his 17 year career for Montpellier Hérault RC in the Top 14 championship. His usual position was as a flanker.

Ouedraogo started playing rugby at the age of six, meeting future teammate François Trinh-Duc at the Pic-Saint-Loup rugby school near Montpellier. They both entered the club's youth teams at "Cadet" level (U-13/14). The two are said to be inseparable friends.

Ouedraogo and Trinh-Duc, together with Louis Picamoles and Julien Tomas, are considered part of the talents embodying the success of Montpellier's attempt at "shaking up the old order" of French rugby in the Septimanie terroir which had always been historical rival Béziers's stronghold.

Ouedraogo is the current captain of Montpellier, and was a key player in the club's outstanding 2010–11 season. He fractured his hand in the 26–25 semi-final win, causing him to miss the final, which was won by Toulouse.

== International career ==
France's coach Bernard Laporte acknowledged Ouedraogo's outstanding club form by including him in France's mid-year Test squad for a two-game series against the All Blacks in New Zealand in 2007. Ouedraogo made his international debut as a replacement in the second test in Wellington, but ended up not making the cut for the 2007 Rugby World Cup squad. He was later called up by new coach Marc Lièvremont for the 2008 Six Nations Championship.

Ouedraogo was named in France's squad for the 2011 Rugby World Cup. He was an unused replacement as New Zealand beat France in the final.

Ouedraogo was selected by new coach Philippe Saint-André in the initial 30-man squad for the 2012 Six Nations Championship, but was not chosen for the first two matches. He was later selected for France's 2012 Autumn Internationals, and was in the starting line-up for all three test matches.

=== International tries ===
#	Date	Venue	Opponent	Result (France-...)	Competition
1.	14 February 2009	Stade de France, Saint-Denis, France	Scotland	22–13	Six Nations Championship

== Personal ==
Ouedraogo is a cousin of the famous MMA fighter and long-time UFC veteran Cheick Kongo. He has the initials of his sister, mother and brother (MBG) tattooed on his left shoulder in hindi.

== Honours ==
During his club career with Montpellier Hérault RC, Ouedraogo won the Top 14 championship in 2021–22 and claimed the European Challenge Cup twice, in 2015–16 and 2020–21. He was also part of the squad that reached the Top 14 final in 2010–11, though he missed the match due to injury. Ouedraogo holds the club record for most appearances, having played 340 matches across his 17-season career with Montpellier.

At international level, Ouedraogo was part of the France squad that won the 2010 Six Nations Championship with a Grand Slam. He also earned a runners-up medal at the 2011 Rugby World Cup, where France were defeated by New Zealand in the final.

== Post-retirement ==
Following his retirement at the end of the 2021–22 season, Ouedraogo briefly returned to play for Montpellier during the 2022–23 season as an additional player to help the squad cope with injuries. He has since transitioned into an off-field role with the club, working as Head of Brand Identity and Development, where he focuses on the club's brand strategy and identity while emphasizing human-centered approaches, collective performance, and knowledge transmission.

Beyond his work with Montpellier, Ouedraogo has pursued several ventures in media and business. He worked as a rugby consultant for M6 television during the 2023 Rugby World Cup and is available for corporate speaking engagements, seminars, conferences, and team-building events. He has also co-founded Fake Real Love, a family-oriented clothing brand built on values of authenticity, simplicity, and tradition.
