= Lièvremont =

Lièvremont is a French surname. Notable people with the surname include:

- Marc Lièvremont (born 1968), French rugby union player
- Matthieu Lièvremont (born 1975), French rugby union player
- Thomas Lièvremont (born 1973), French rugby union player

== See also ==
- Maisons-du-Bois-Lièvremont, French commune
