= Fabien Barcella =

France international rugby union player

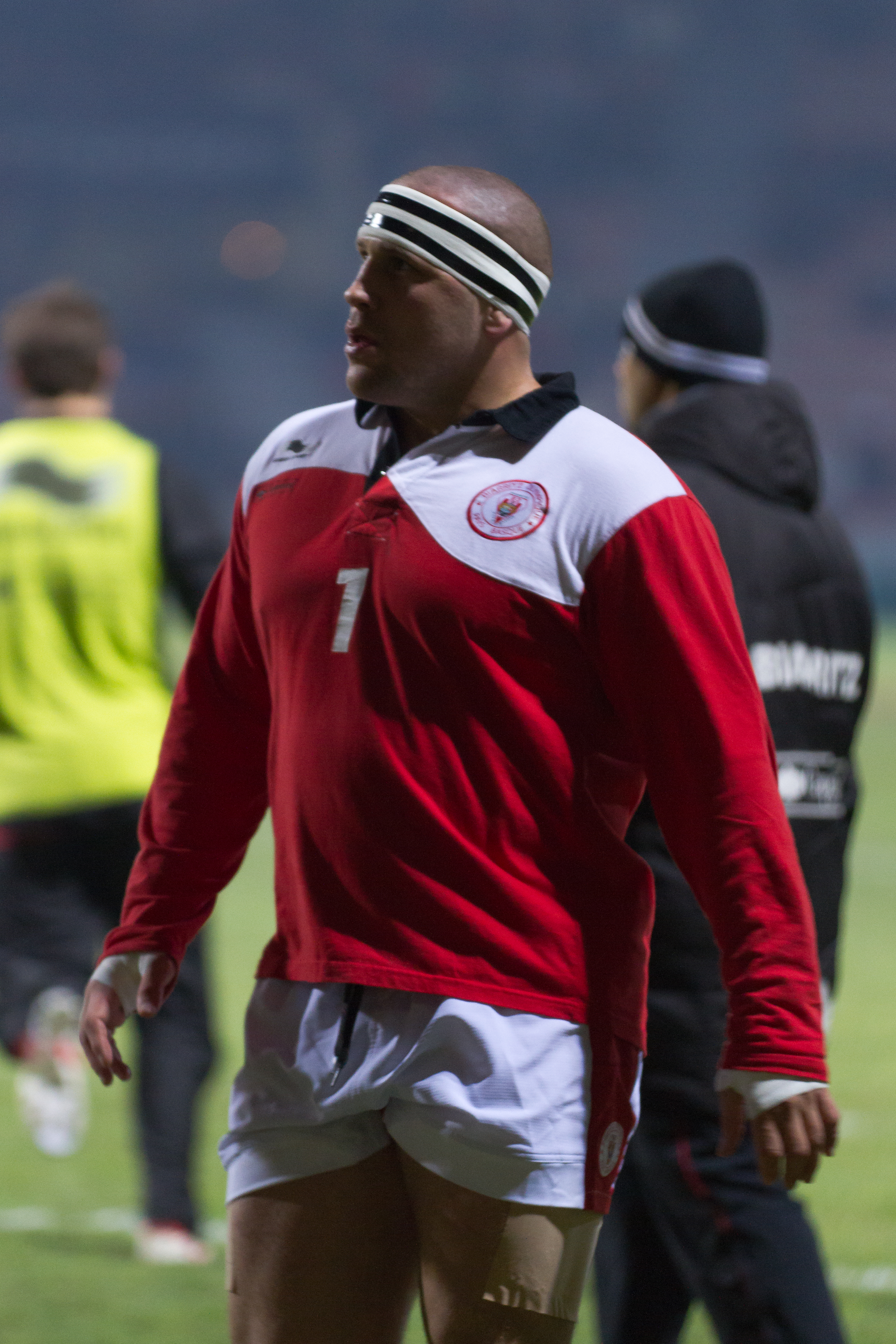
- Born: Fabien Barcella; 27 October 1983 (age 43) Agen, Lot-et-Garonne, France
- Height: 1.83 m (6 ft 0 in)
- Weight: 108 kg (238 lb)

Rugby union career
- Position: Prop
- Current team: FC Grenoble
Amateur team(s)
Years	Team	Apps	(Points)
- Valence-d'Agen
Senior career
Years	Team	Apps	(Points)
2002–2004	Agen		
2004–2005	Toulousain	1	(0)
2005–2006	Valence-d'Agen	0	(0)
2006–2008	Auch	27	(5)
2008–2014	Biarritz	112	(5)
2014–2015	Toulonnais	3	(0)
2015–2016	Grenoble	31	(5)
International career
Years	Team	Apps	(Points)
2008–2011	France	20	(0)

Fabien Barcella (born 27 October 1983) is a French former professional rugby union player who played as a prop. He played for France at international level, earning 20 caps between 2008 and 2011.

== Domestic Clubs ==
Barcella played for Toulouse before joining Valence-d'Agen in 2005. He then went on to play for Auch between 2006 and 2008. In 2008 he joined Biarritz Olympique where he made his Heineken Cup debut.

== International Selection ==
In 2008 French coach Marc Lievremont sprung a surprise when he called up Barcella for the 2008 Six Nations Championship match against Italy at the Stade de France. He was also called up to the Wales game a week later. He featured again in the Autumn against Argentina. During the 2009 Six Nations Championship, he was in competition with Sale prop Lionel Faure for the starting job, which he obtained, making big performances. He played at the 2011 Rugby World Cup squad in New Zealand.

He was later called for test matches against New Zealand and Australia in June, where he made a number of standout performances. Barcella is often seen as one of the best loose head props in the world, his ability to destroy his opposite number in the scrum and cause havoc around the pitch with his brute aggression often sets him apart from his peers.
