= Lievore =

Lievore is an Italian surname. Notable people with the surname include:

- Carlo Lievore (1937–2002), Italian javelin thrower
- Giovanni Lievore (1932–2025), Italian javelin thrower

== See also ==
- Lièvremont
