= Arnaud Méla =

French rugby union player (born 1980)

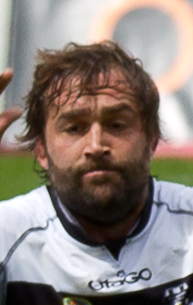
- Born: Arnaud Méla; 9 January 1980 (age 46) Saint-Gaudens, France
- Height: 6 ft 5 in (1.96 m)
- Weight: 19 st 10 lb (125 kg)

Rugby union career
- Position: Lock
- Current team: CA Brive
Senior career
| Years | Team | Apps | (Points) |
| | Lannemezan | 0 | (0) |
| | Pau | 0 | (0) |
| 2002-2003 | Tours | 0 | (0) |
| 2003-2008 | Albi | 79 | (25) |
| 2008-17 | Brive | 186 | (25) |
International career
| Years | Team | Apps | (Points) |
| 2008- | France | 4 | (0) |

Arnaud Méla (born 9 January 1980 in Saint-Gaudens, Haute-Garonne, France) is a rugby union player for CA Brive in the Top 14. Méla's position of choice is at lock. He previously played for SC Albi.

He was called up to the France squad for the 2008 Six Nations Championship. He made his France debut against Scotland on 3 February 2008 at Murrayfield.
