= Julien Brugnaut =

French rugby union player

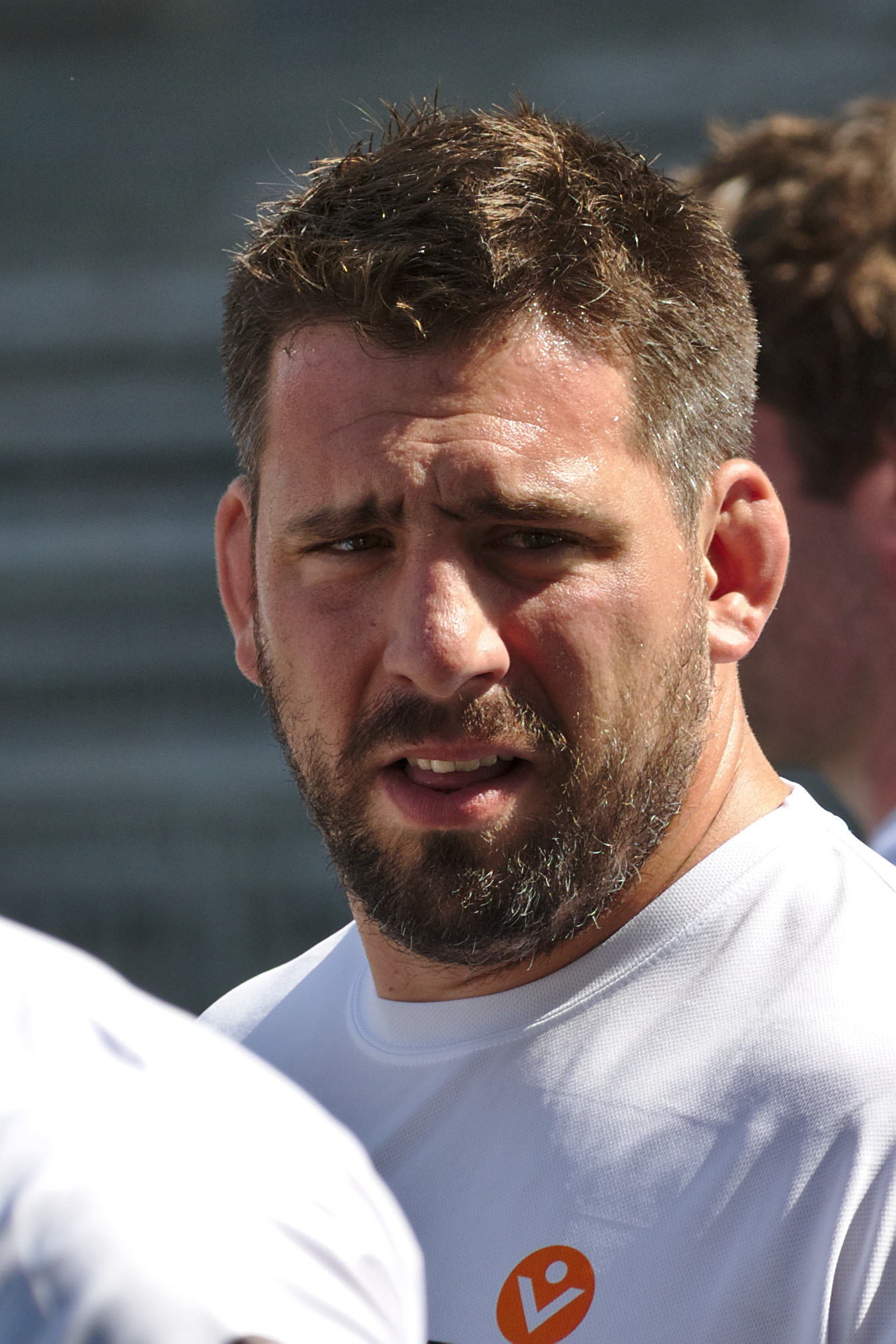
- Born: 17 November 1981 (age 44) Lille, France
- Height: 1.86 m (6 ft 1 in)
- Weight: 120 kg (19 st; 260 lb)

Rugby union career
- Position: Prop
Senior career
Years	Team	Apps	(Points)
2004–2006	Montpellier	22	(10)
2006–2009	Dax	62	(5)
2009–2010	Munster	15	(0)
2010–2017	Racing 92	150	(0)
2017–2018	Brive	15	(10)
- Correct as of 20 December 2019
International career
Years	Team	Apps	(Points)
2008	France	2	(0)

Julien Brugnaut (born 17 November 1981) is a French former rugby union prop.

He was called up to the France squad for the 2008 Six Nations Championship. It was in this tournament that he made his France debut against Scotland on 3 February 2008 at Murrayfield.
