= Richard Wigglesworth (rugby union) =

England international rugby union player

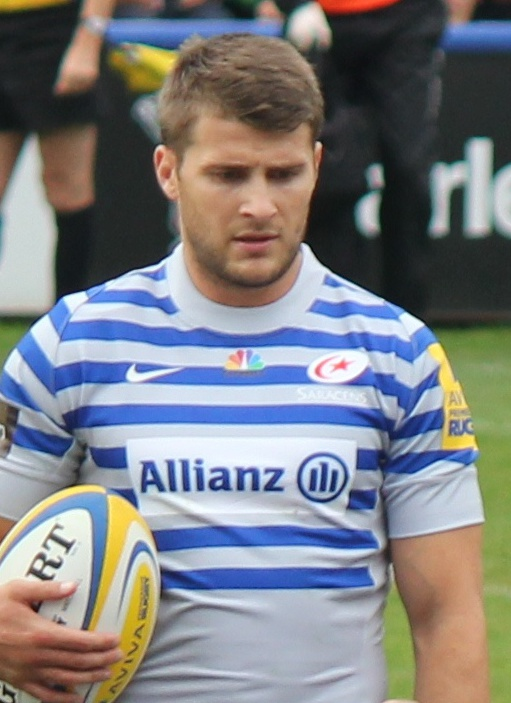
- Wigglesworth in 2013
- Born: Richard Eric Wigglesworth; 9 June 1983 (age 43) Blackpool, Lancashire, England
- Height: 1.76 m (5 ft 9 in)
- Weight: 84 kg (13 st 3 lb; 185 lb)
- School: Kirkham Grammar School

Rugby union career
- Position: Scrum-half
- Current team: Leicester Tigers
Senior career
Years	Team	Apps	(Points)
2002–2010	Sale Sharks	156	(106)
2010–2020	Saracens	250	(155)
2020–2022	Leicester Tigers	43	(20)
2002–2022	Total	449	(281)
- Correct as of 17 December 2022
International career
Years	Team	Apps	(Points)
2008–2018	England	33	(5)
- Correct as of 16 October 2019
Coaching career
- Years: Team
- 2019: Canada (Assistant)
- 2021–2022: Leicester Tigers (Assistant)
- 2022–2023: Leicester Tigers (Interim Head Coach)
- 2023–: England (Assistant)
- 2025: British & Irish Lions (Assistant)

Richard Eric Peter Wigglesworth (born 9 June 1983) is an English rugby union coach and former professional player. He played over 400 club games for Sale Sharks, Saracens and Leicester Tigers, and holds the record for most appearances in the Premiership. He has won seven Premiership titles - one with Sale, five with Saracens, and one with Leicester, as well as three European Rugby Champions Cups with Saracens. Between 2008 and 2018 he won 33 caps for England.

== Early life ==
Born in Blackpool, England, he attended Kirkham Grammar School. Wigglesworth's primary position was scrum-half.

== Playing career ==
Wigglesworth started his professional career with Sale Sharks coming through the youth ranks, and starting the 2005–06 Premiership final. In June 2010, Wigglesworth moved to Saracens. During his time at Saracens he won five further Premiership titles in 2011, 2015, 2016, 2018 and 2019, with Wigglesworth featuring in all five finals. He also helped Saracens win the European Champions Cup in 2016, 2017 and 2019. He left Saracens at the conclusion of the 2019–20 season.

On 6 November 2020 Wigglesworth joined Leicester Tigers for the 2020-21 Premiership Rugby season. Wigglesworth was the first player to appear in 300 Premiership matches on 5 June 2021 when he came on as a replacement in the second half of the match against Bristol. He started the 2022 Premiership Rugby final as Tigers beat his former club Saracens 15-12, with Wigglesworth winning his seventh title.

=== International ===
Wigglesworth was called up to the England squad for the 2008 Six Nations Championship. He was selected for the England Saxons and the training squad for the 2007 Rugby World Cup.

Wigglesworth was named in the starting line-up for England in the 2008 RBS Six Nations Championship match against France in Paris. Sale coach Philippe Saint-Andre said he is confident that England newcomer Wigglesworth has the mentality required for international rugby. On 23 February 2008, he scored a 79th minute try to help England to a 24–13 win in Paris.

== Coaching career ==
In the early 2000s, while being a professional player, Wigglesworth was part of the coaching team at amateur club Ormskirk RUFC, working with the youth teams.

Wigglesworth served as the defence and kicking coach of Canada at the 2019 Rugby World Cup. Wigglesworth joined the coaching team at Ealing Trailfinders in 2019 as Attack Coach, combining this part time role with his playing commitments at Saracens. Following his move to Leicester Tigers in November 2020, he joined the coaching team ahead of the 2021–22 season, taking up the Attack Coach role in addition to remaining as an active and key player in the Premiership winning squad.

With the release of both Steve Borthwick and Kevin Sinfield from Leicester he was promoted to Interim Head Coach and immediately retired as a player. Wigglesworth lead Leicester in 16 games. On 7 February 2023, England confirmed that Wigglesworth would join the national side as attack coach at the end of the season.

Wigglesworth was selected by Andy Farrell to be an assistant coach for the 2025 British and Irish Lions tour.

== Honours ==
=== Sale Sharks ===
- Premiership Rugby: 2005-06
- European Challenge Cup: 2004–05

=== Saracens ===
- Premiership Rugby: 2010–11, 2014–15, 2015–16, 2017–18, 2018–19
- European Rugby Champions Cup: 2015–16, 2016–17, 2018–19
- Anglo-Welsh Cup: 2014–15

=== Leicester Tigers ===
- Premiership Rugby: 2021–22

=== England ===
- Calcutta Cup: 2015
- Millennium Trophy: 2008

== Personal life ==
Wigglesworth married Lindsay Jane Fitzgerald in July 2009 and they now have two daughters, Matilda and Margot and a son, Freddie. Lindsay is a qualified dentist and graduated from Liverpool University's BDS course in 2007.

=== International tries ===
As of 7 July 2019

Try	Opposing team	Location	Venue	Competition	Date	Result	Score
1	France	Paris, France	Stade de France	2008 Six Nations	23 February 2008	Win	24 – 13
