= Pietro Travagli =

- Born: Pietro Travagli; 28 April 1981 (age 45) Treviso, Italy
- Height: 1.80 m (5 ft 11 in)
- Weight: 92 kg (203 lb)

Rugby union career
- Position: Scrum-half
- Current team: Petrarca
Senior career
Years	Team	Apps	(Points)
2000-2001	Treviso	1	(0)
2001-2002	Viadana	16	(15)
2002-2003	Petrarca	19	(25)
2003-2004	Treviso	13	(5)
2004-2006	Viadana	31	(40)
2006-2007	Bath	1	(0)
2007-2009	Parma	24	(35)
2009-2010	Rovigo	9	(0)
2010-	Petrarca		
2010-2011	→Aironi (permit)		
- Correct as of 24 January 2010
International career
Years	Team	Apps	(Points)
2004–	Italy	9	(5)
- Correct as of 24 January 2010

Pietro Travagli (born 28 April 1981) is an Italian rugby union player. He plays as a scrum-half.

He plays for Petrarca in the Top12.

He was called up to the Italy squad for the 2008 Six Nations Championship.

On 7 February 2011, he joined Aironi as a permit player for one month during the 2011 Six Nations Championship to fill in for the internationals called by Italy.
