= Simon Picone =

Italian rugby union player

- Born: Simon Picone; 26 September 1982 (age 44) Rome, Italy
- Height: 1.80 m (5 ft 11 in)
- Weight: 92 kg (203 lb)

Rugby union career
- Position: Scrum-half
- Current team: Benetton Treviso
Senior career
| Years | Team | Apps | (Points) |
| 1998–2000 | Viterbo | 1 | (0) |
| 2000–2001 | Rugby Roma | 1 | (5) |
| 2001–2002 | Rugby Silea | 19 | (40) |
| 2002– | Treviso | 87 | (70) |
- Correct as of 31 January 2010
International career
| Years | Team | Apps | (Points) |
| 2008– | Italy | 23 | (5) |
- Correct as of 10 September 2010

Simon Picone (born 26 September 1982) is an Italian rugby union player for Benetton Treviso in the Pro14 competition. He was born in Viterbo.

A Scrum-half, Picone was called up to the Italy squad for the 2008 Six Nations Championship. He came off the bench in Italy's 23–19 defeat to England in Rome to run in a try after charging down debutant England fly-half Danny Cipriani's kick.
