= Thomas Lièvremont =

France international rugby union player

Thomas Lievremont
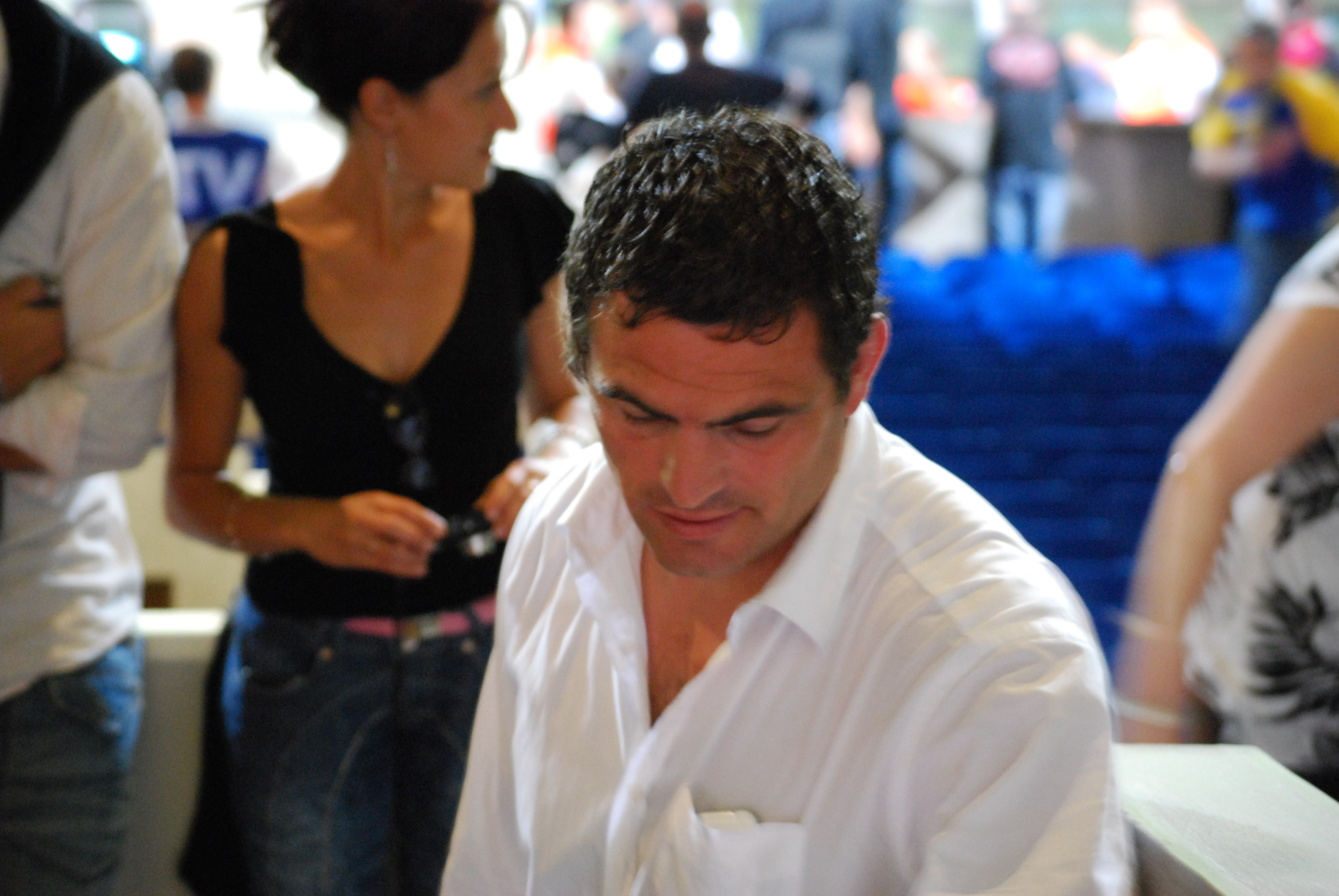
- Thomas Lièvremon
- Born: 6 November 1973 (age 53) Perpignan, France
- Height: 6.2 ft (1.9 m)
- Weight: 17.5 st (111 kg; 245 lb)
- Notable relative(s): Marc Lievremont; Matthieu Lievremont (brothers)

Rugby union career
- Position: Number 8
Senior career
Years	Team	Apps	(Points)
1996–2000	Perpignan	81	(100)
2002–2007	Biarritz	130	(130)
2007–2008	Dax	20	(20)
International career
Years	Team	Apps	(Points)
1996–2006	France	27	(20)
Coaching career
- Years: Team
- 2008–2010: Dax
- 2010–2011: Bayonne (assistant)
- 2015–2017: France U20 (manager)
- 2018: Romania

Thomas Lièvremont (born 6 November 1973) is a French rugby union footballer.

Thomas Lièvremont was born in Perpignan. His usual position was at number-eight. He was a part of the Biarritz team that won the 2005–06 Top 14, and runners-up of the 2005-06 Heineken Cup. He has also played for the France national team. He made his international debut for France in 1996 against Wales, and was a part of their 1999 Rugby World Cup squad.

He is the brother of two other rugby players: Matthieu and Marc, who was appointed coach of the French team on 24 October 2007. Their sister was also a rugby player.

Sporting positions
Preceded by (Wales) Lynn Howells	Romania national rugby union coach 2018	Succeeded by (Romania) Marius Țincu (caretaker)
