= Lionel Faure =

French rugby union player (born 1977)

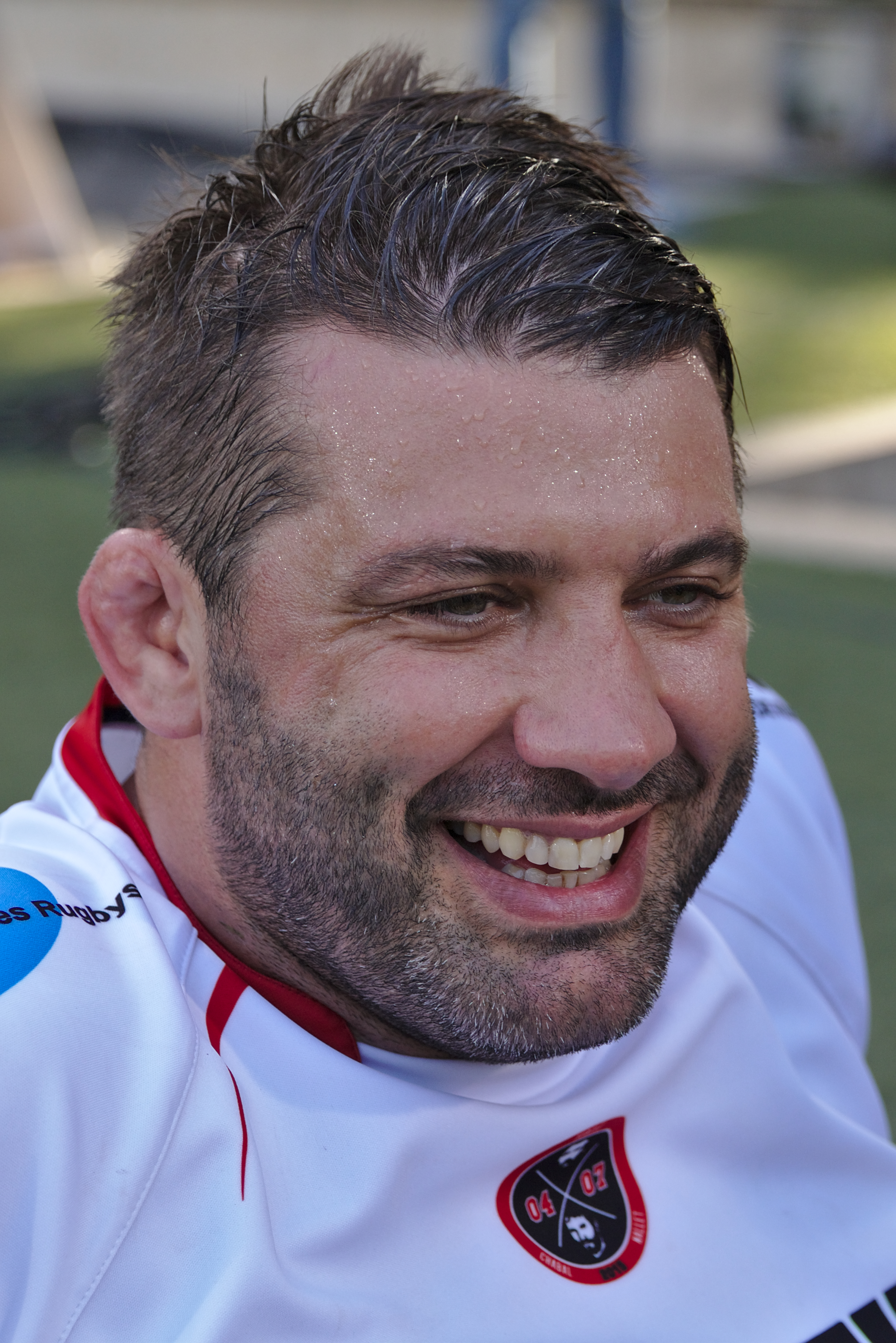
- Born: Lionel Faure; 26 November 1977 (age 48) Montauban, France
- Height: 6 ft 1 in (1.86 m)
- Weight: 18 st 6 lb (117 kg)

Rugby union career
- Position: Loosehead prop
- Current team: Clermont Auvergne
Senior career
Years	Team	Apps	(Points)
- Beaumont
- Valance d'Agen
1999–2001	Clermont		
2001–2003	La Rochelle		
2003–2005	Section Paloise		
2005–2009	Sale Sharks	64	(10)
2009–	Clermont		
International career
Years	Team	Apps	(Points)
2008–	France	8	(0)

Lionel Faure (born 26 November 1977 in France) is a rugby union player for Clermont Auvergne in the Top 14. Faure plays as a Loosehead prop, and previously played for the Sale Sharks and won the 2005–06 Guinness Premiership with them, starting in the final.

He was called up to the France squad for the 2008 Six Nations and played in the 2009 Six Nations. Altogether he has played in five matches in the tournament.
