= Matthieu Lièvremont =

French rugby union player (born 1975)

- Born: 6 November 1975 (age 51) Perpignan, France
- Height: 1.88 m (6 ft 2 in)
- Weight: 97 kg (15 st 4 lb)

Rugby union career
- Position: Flanker
- Current team: Dax
Senior career
Years	Team	Apps	(Points)
1998–2001	Toulouse		
2001–2007	Agen	103	(65)
2007–	Dax	64	(20)
- Correct as of 27 February 2010
International career
Years	Team	Apps	(Points)
2008	France	2	(0)
- Correct as of February 27, 2010

Matthieu Lièvremont (born 6 November 1975 in Perpignan) is a French rugby union player, usually playing as a flanker but sometimes as well as number 8. He currently plays for US Dax.

The younger brother of Marc and Thomas Lièvremont, both French international players, he received his first international cap on 28 June 2008 against Australia while Marc was France's head coach, which sparked some controversy.
