= Morgan Parra =

France international rugby union player

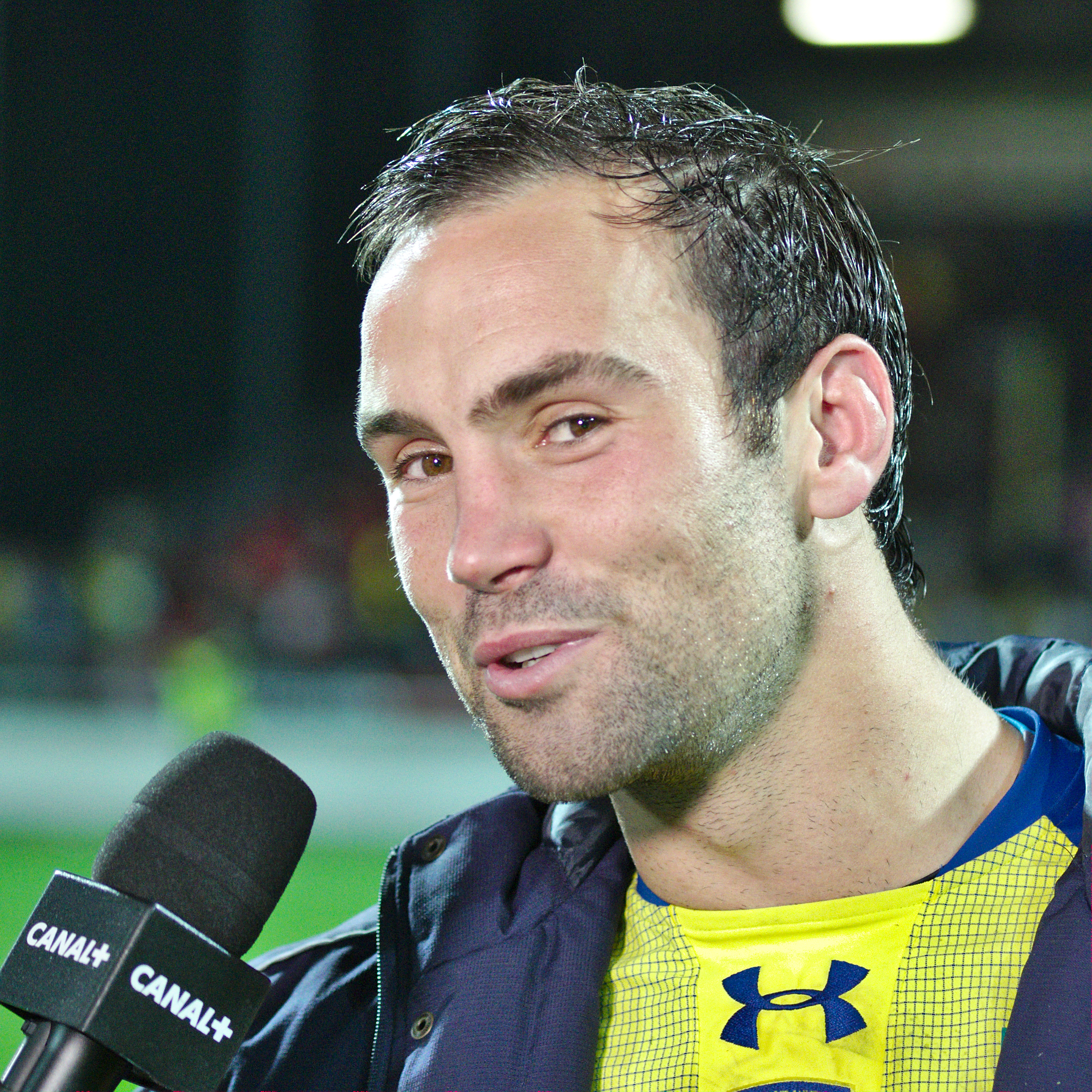
- Born: Morgan Parra; 15 November 1988 (age 37) Metz, France
- Height: 5 ft 11 in (1.80 m)
- Weight: 77 kg (12 st 2 lb)

Rugby union career
- Position: Scrum-half / Fly-half
Youth career
- 1993–2003: Metz
- 2003–2005: Dijon
- 2005–2006: Bourgoin
Senior career
Years	Team	Apps	(Points)
2006–2009	Bourgoin	62	(108)
2009–2022	Clermont	300	(2,301)
2022–2023	Stade Français	17	(5)
International career
Years	Team	Apps	(Points)
2006–2008	France U20	10	(26)
2008–2019	France	71	(370)

Morgan Parra (born 15 November 1988) is a former French rugby union player who played as a scrum-half and occasionally fly-half. He played most of his career with Clermont Auvergne after signing for them from Bourgoin. He is of Portuguese origin through his father, Antonio.

== Career ==
Parra started playing rugby aged four for Metz. He made his debut for France aged 19 as a replacement against Scotland in the 2008 Six Nations Championship, making his first start for France in a defeat to England at the Stade de France. He is also a front-line goal-kicker, having taken on the mantle at Test level.

At club level Parra came to prominence with Top 14 strugglers Bourgoin, before moving to heavyweights Clermont Auvergne in 2009 replacing Pierre Mignoni and striking up a strong partnership with Australian fly-half Brock James. He played in the final as Clermont won the Top 14 title in 2009–10, scoring a conversion and three penalties in the process.

In 2010 Parra was instrumental in guiding France to a Six Nations Grand Slam. He was picked partly after Julien Dupuy who was first choice in the 2009 autumn internationals was banned for eye gouging. After being paired with the equally youthful François Trinh-Duc at half-back, he produced a number of masterful performances, including a rout of reigning champions Ireland at the Stade de France.

On 23 October 2021 Parra completes a record series of 48 successful penalty kicks in a row against Pau.

On 5 June 2022 Parra played his last match for Clermont Auvergne as he signed to play for State Francais from 2022 onwards.

== Style ==
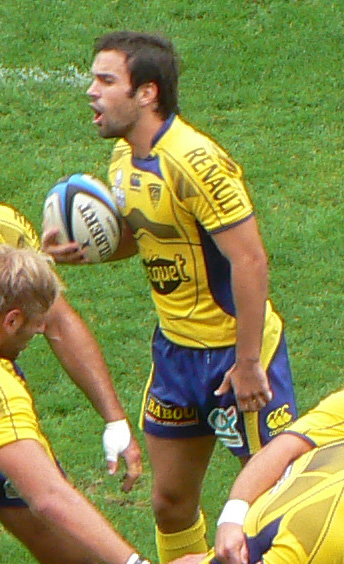
Parra directing his forwards

Parra is known as a particularly vocal leader of the pack and is known in France as the petit général. He is a reliable kicker.

== Honours ==
Club

Clermont

Top 14 Winner (2): 2010, 2017

European Rugby Challenge Cup Winner: 2019

International

France

Six Nations Winner: 2010

Grand Slam Winner: 2010

Rugby World Cup Runner Up: 2011
