= Julien Tomas =

French rugby union player (born 1985)

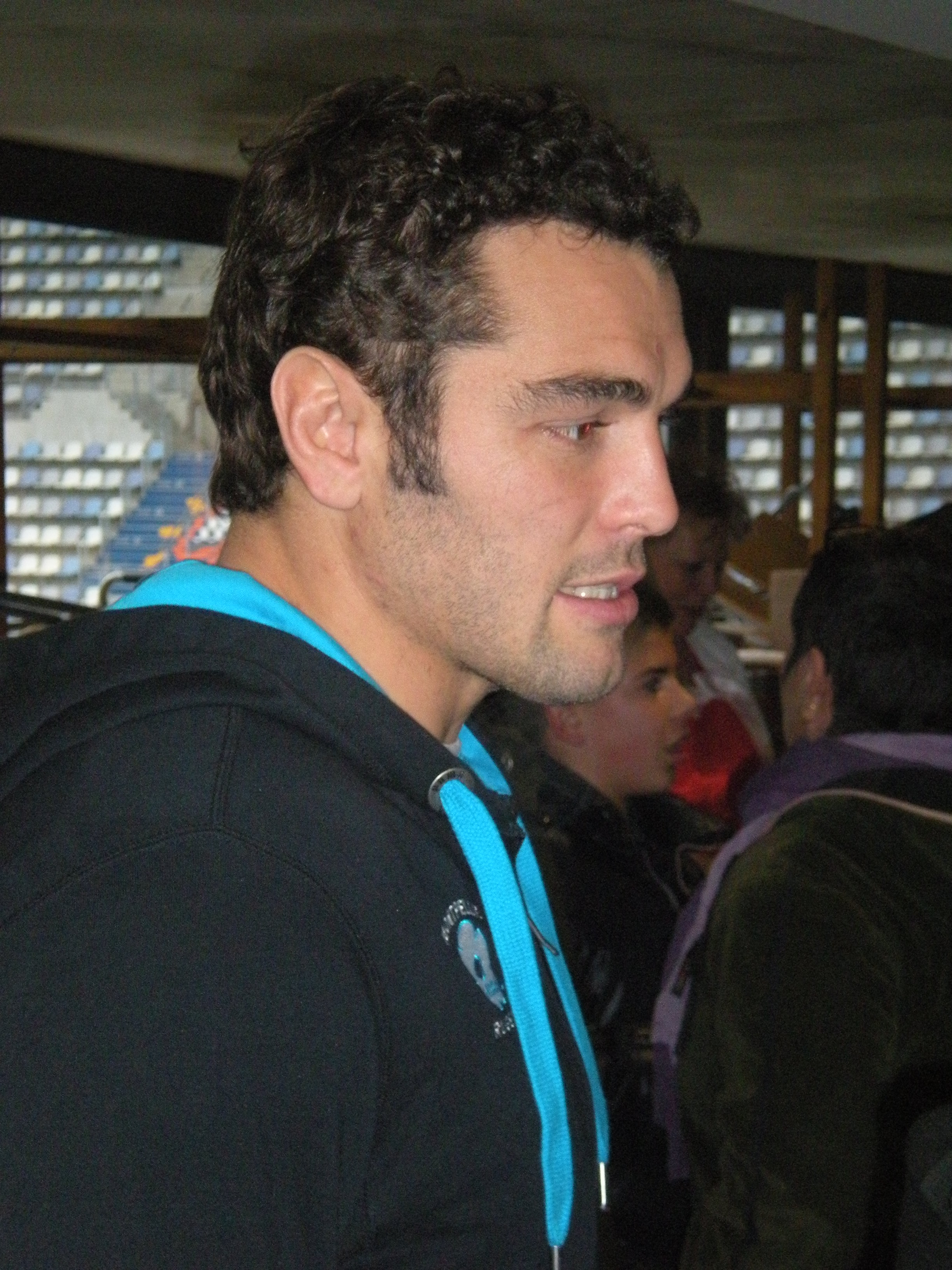
- Born: Julien Tomas; April 21, 1985 (age 41) Montpellier, Hérault
- Height: 1.83 m (6 ft 0 in)
- Weight: 83 kg (183 lb)

Rugby union career
- Position: Scrum-half
Senior career
Years	Team	Apps	(Points)
2004–2013	Montpellier	196	(101)
2013–2014	Castres	18	(0)
2014–2016	Stade Français	46	(15)
2016–2018	Pau	47	(15)
2018–	Montpellier	0	(0)
- Correct as of 20 July 2018
International career
Years	Team	Apps	(Points)
2008–2011	France	3	(0)

Julien Tomas (born 21 April 1985) is a French rugby union footballer. He plays as a scrum-half.

Born in Montpellier, Julien Tomas currently plays for Montpellier in the Top 14.

He played for France U-21, where he was World Champion in 2006. He also played for France A, including captaining them.

Tomas was a member of France squad at the 2008 Six Nations Championship, earning his first cap in the match with Italy, which France won by 25-13, on 9 March 2008. He currently has 3 caps for his national team.
