= Lionel Nallet =

France international rugby union player (born 1976)

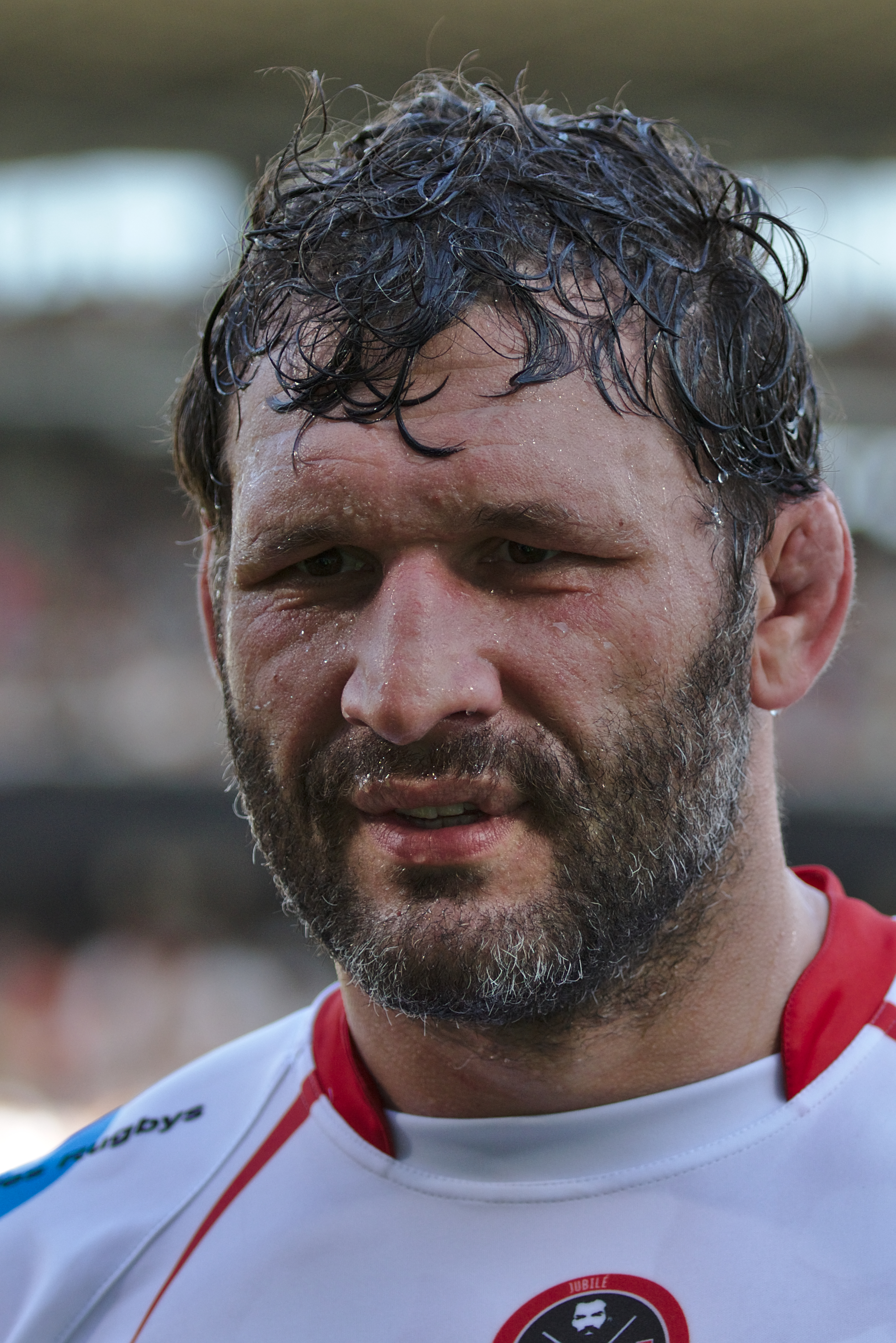
- Born: Lionel Nallet; 14 September 1976 (age 50) Bourg-en-Bresse, France
- Height: 197 cm (6 ft 6 in)
- Weight: 115 kg (18 st 2 lb)

Rugby union career
- Position: Lock
Youth career
- 1982–1994: Bourg-en-Bresse
Senior career
Years	Team	Apps	(Points)
1994–1997	Bourg-en-Bresse		
1997–2003	Bourgoin		
2003–2009	Castres	129	(40)
2009–2012	Racing Métro	60	(10)
2012–2015	Lyon	75	(35)
International career
Years	Team	Apps	(Points)
2000–2012	France	74	(45)

Lionel Nallet (born 14 September 1976) is a former French rugby union player. He played as a lock and is a former captain of the France national team. He began his professional career with CS Bourgoin-Jallieu, playing there from 1998 to 2003 before moving to Castres Olympique. Nallet moved from there to Racing in 2009 before finishing his career with Lyon OU between 2012 and 2015.

Nallet made his international debut for France on 28 May 2000 in a test match against Romania at Bucharest's Dinamo Stadium. France won the match 67–20, with Nallet scoring a try on debut. He next played for his country the following year, in a match against England during the 2001 Six Nations Championship. Nallet made another five appearances for France that year, playing in test matches against the South Africa, the New Zealand, Australia and Fiji.

In 2003 Nallet played in matches against Argentina and New Zealand. However, he was not included in the squad for the 2003 Rugby World Cup in Australia or in 2004. He played four times for France during November 2005. He was a part of France's 2006 Six Nations Championship victory and was subsequently included in the national squad for the mid-year tests against Romania and the Springboks.

In 2008, following the retirement of Raphaël Ibañez, he was named as captain of the French side.

On 30 April 2009, it was announced that Nallet had signed a 3-year contract with Racing Métro, who were promoted from the Pro D2 to the Top 14 after the club won the 2008–09 Championship. He was joined at the club by the iconic Sébastien Chabal, who also signed a 3-year contract with the club.

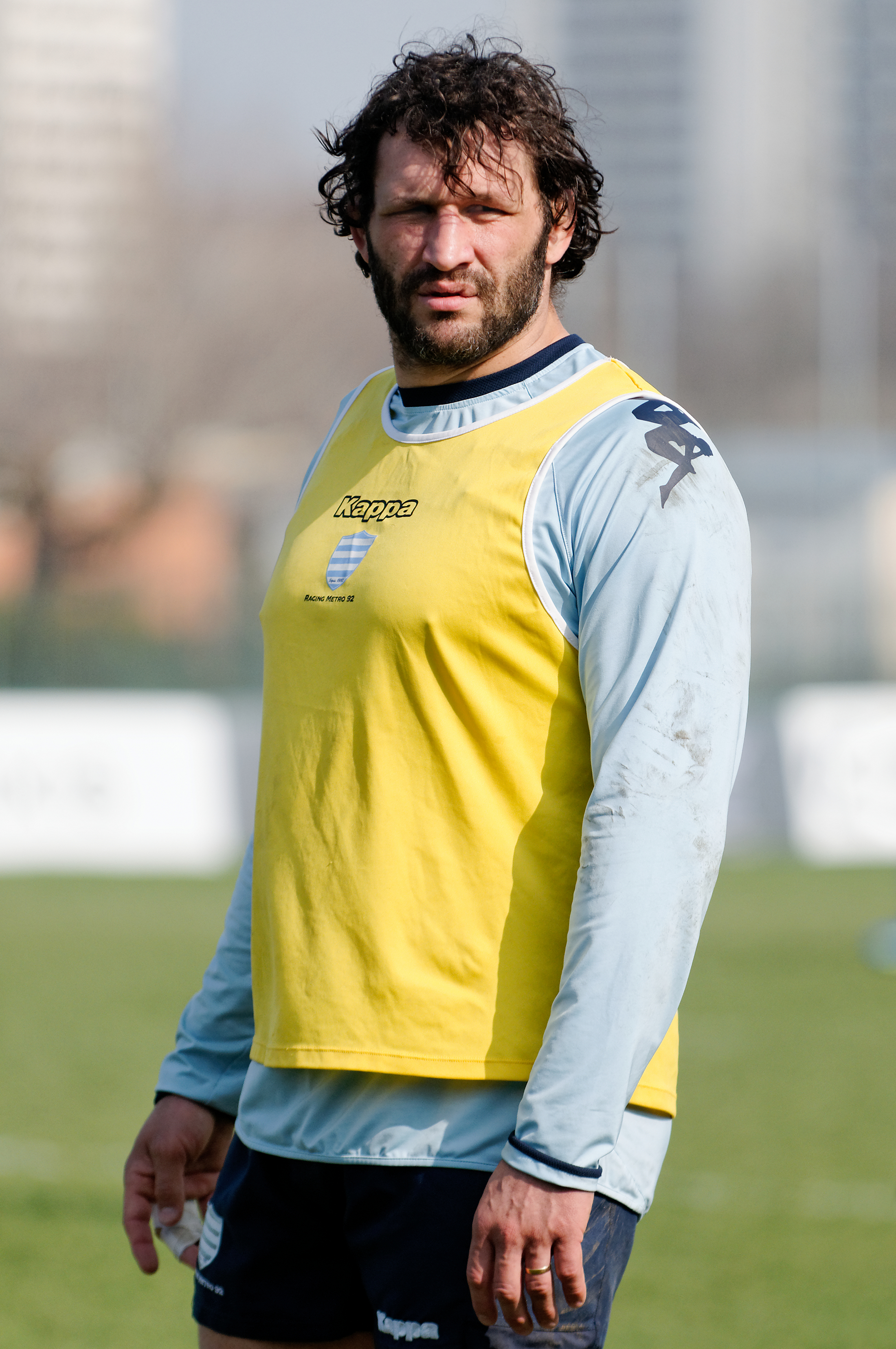

Preceded by Raphaël Ibañez	French national rugby union captain 2008–2009	Succeeded by Thierry Dusautoir
