= Louis Picamoles =

French rugby union player (born 1986)

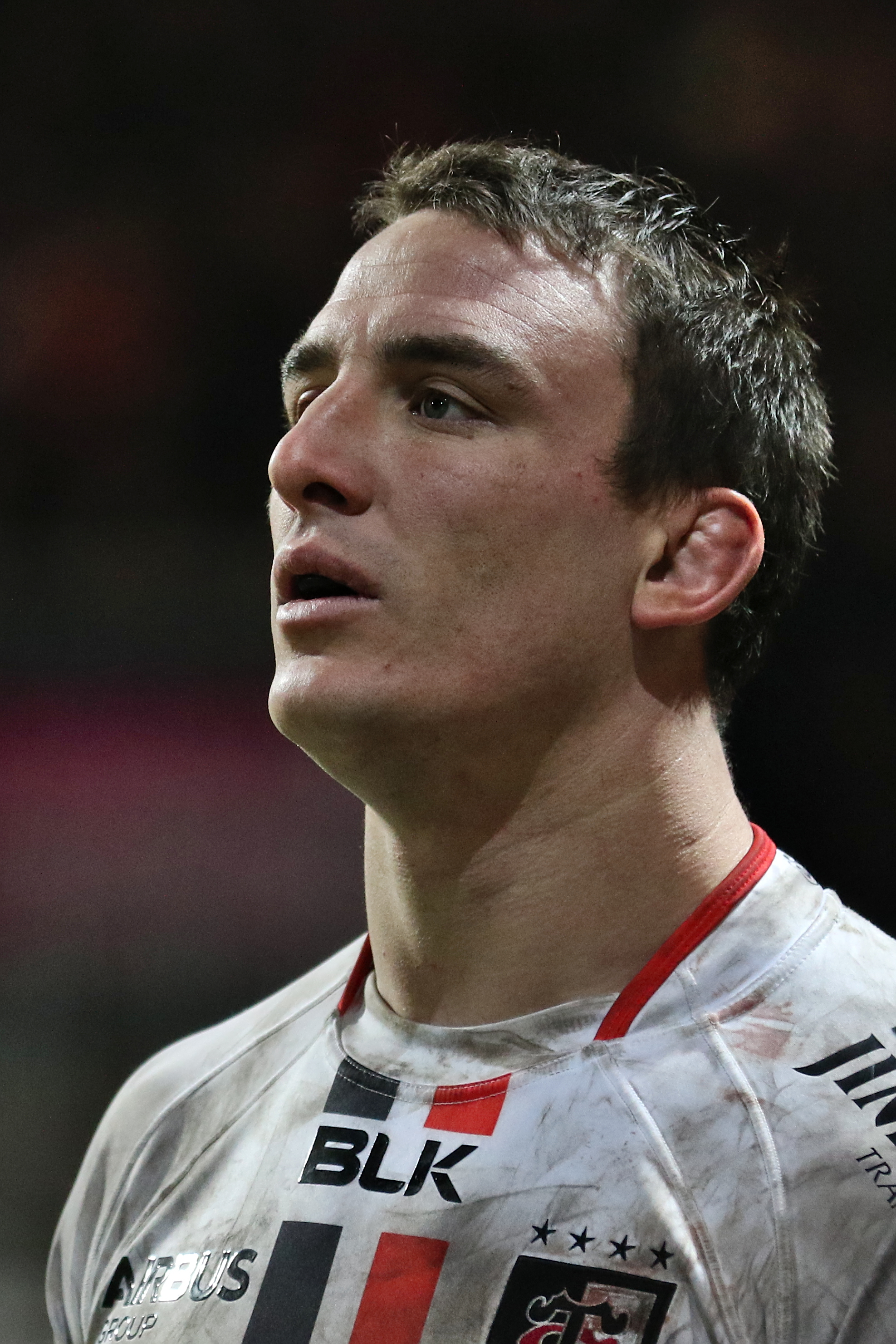
- Picamoles playing for Toulouse in 2015
- Born: Louis Picamoles; 5 February 1986 (age 40) Paris, France
- Height: 1.92 m (6 ft 4 in)
- Weight: 116 kg (18 st 4 lb; 256 lb)

Rugby union career
- Position(s): Number eight, Flanker
Senior career
Years	Team	Apps	(Points)
2004–2009	Montpellier	64	(55)
2009–2016	Toulouse	150	(110)
2016–2017	Northampton Saints	20	(20)
2017–2021	Montpellier	57	(112)
2021–2022	Bordeaux	37	(10)
- Correct as of 19 May 2022
International career
Years	Team	Apps	(Points)
2008–2019	France	82	(50)
- Correct as of 2 March 2022

Louis Picamoles (born 5 February 1986) is a former French professional rugby union player who most recently played for Bordeaux Bègles in the Top 14. Picamoles's usual position was at number eight.

== Club career ==
Picamoles began his club career at Montpellier in 1999 and played for the club for ten years, in which he picked up 64 appearances. His first professional match was on 2 October 2004 against Auch during the 2004–05 Top 16 season. His last match was 16 May 2009, during the 2008–09 Top 14 season against Toulon.

For the 2009–10 Top 14 season, Picamoles signed with Toulouse, where in his debut season, he was part of the team that made it all the way to the semi-finals, losing to eventual runners-up Perpignan 19–6. In that season, his debut with Toulouse was a narrow 16–17 win against Montauban. That year he was a replacement for the final as Toulouse won the Heineken Cup.

On 2 November 2015, Picamoles joined Northampton Saints in the Aviva Premiership on a three-year deal from the 2016–17 season and made an instant impact, receiving three man of the match awards in the first three home games he featured in.

The number eight also won the Players' Player of the Season and Supporters' Player of the Season as well as the Champagne Moment of the Season at Northampton Saints End of Season Awards at Althorp house as well as scooping the Supporters Club Player of the Year the week before.

It was announced on Wednesday, May 31, 2017 that Picamoles would leave Northampton despite still having two seasons left on his contract to link back up with Montpellier Hérault RC. His former club paid Saints a record transfer fee of at least £1 million for the France international.

On 1 February 2021, Picamoles left Montpellier again to join with Top 14 rivals Bordeaux for the 2021–22 season.

== International career ==
Picamoles has been a familiar face in the France national team since making his debut in 2008 – which was a 26–21 victory over Ireland during the 2008 Six Nations Championship. It was in 2008 that Picamoles scored his first try, against the Pacific Islanders on 15 November. Though part of the 2010 Six Nations Championship squad, Picamoles did not appear once in any of the five tests, in what turned out to be a Grand Slam campaign for Les Bleus. He was part of the 2011 Rugby World Cup squad that came runners-up to New Zealand, only playing in three tests during the tournament. After being dropped by Philippe Saint-André for most of 2014, a return to form with strong performances for Toulouse, saw Louis recalled to the French squad for the 2015 Six Nations Championship.

== International tries ==
#	Date	Venue	Opponent	Result (FRA-Opp.)	Competition
1.	15 November 2008	Stade Bonal, Sochaux, France	Pacific Islanders	42–17	Test Match
2.	16 June 2012	Estadio Mario Alberto Kempes, Cordoba, Argentina	Argentina	20–23	Test Match
3.	10 November 2012	Stade de France, Saint-Denis, France	Australia	33–10	Test Match
4.	3 February 2013	Stadio Olimpico, Rome, Italy	Italy	18–23	Six Nations Championship
5.	9 March 2013	Aviva Stadium, Dublin, Ireland	Ireland	13–13	Six Nations Championship
6.	9 February 2014	Stade de France, Saint-Denis, France	Italy	30–10	Six Nations Championship
7.	17 October 2015	Millennium Stadium, Cardiff, Wales	New Zealand	13–62	2015 Rugby World Cup
8.	26 November 2016	Stade de France, Saint-Denis, France	New Zealand	19–24	Test Match
9.	11 March 2017	Stadio Olimpico, Rome, Italy	Italy	40–18	Six Nations Championship
10.	1 February 2019	Stade de France, Saint-Denis, France	Wales	19–24	Six Nations Championship
