= Thierry Dusautoir =

France international rugby union player

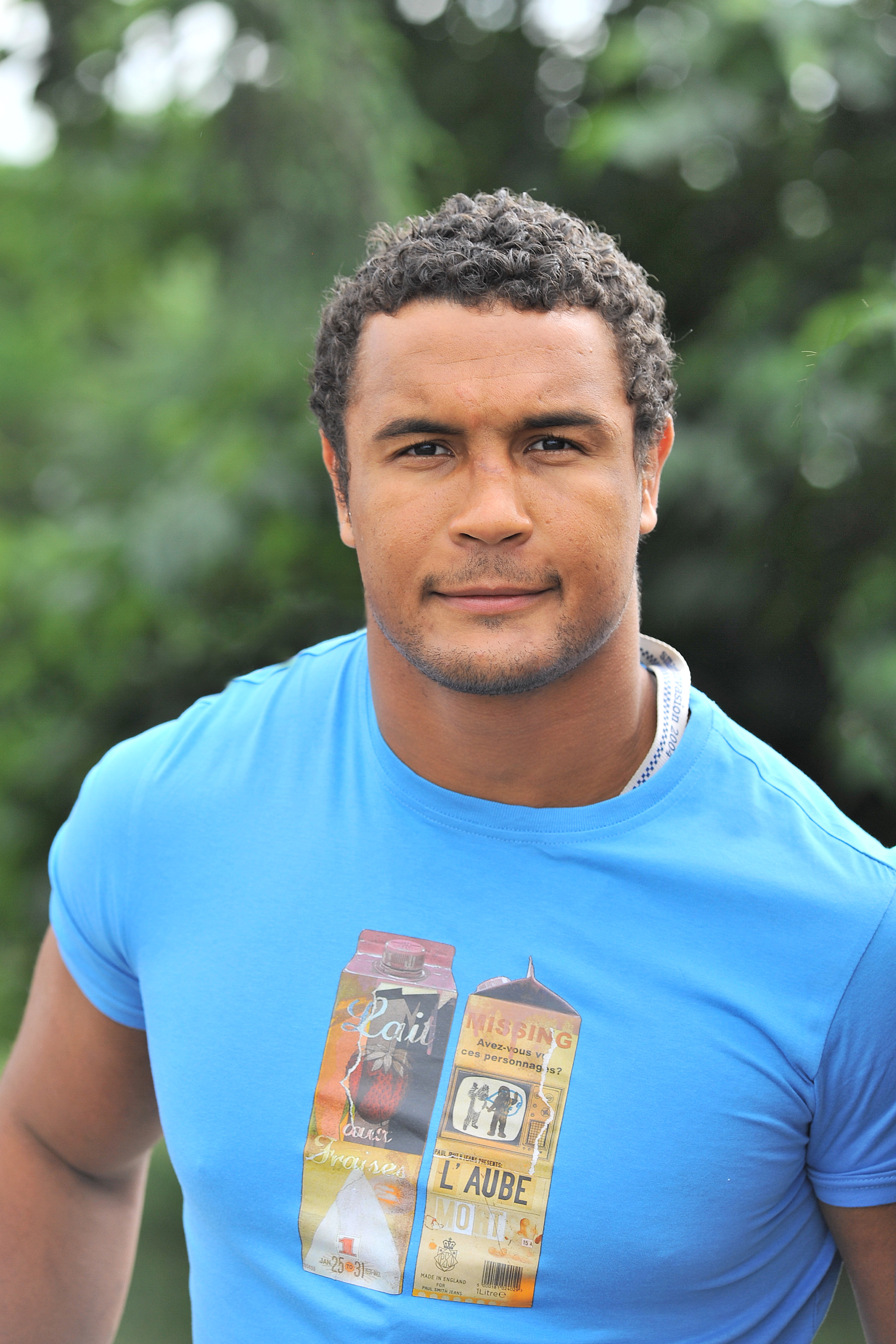
- Born: Thierry Dusautoir; 18 November 1981 (age 45) Abidjan, Ivory Coast
- Height: 188 cm (6 ft 2 in)
- Weight: 100 kg (220 lb; 15 st 10 lb)

Rugby union career
- Position: Openside Flanker
Senior career
Years	Team	Apps	(Points)
2001–2003	Bordeaux	33	(0)
2003–2004	US Colomiers	9	(0)
2004–2006	Biarritz	53	(30)
2006–2017	Toulouse	207	(70)
- Correct as of 25 August 2015
International career
Years	Team	Apps	(Points)
2006–2015	France	80	(30)
2017	Barbarians		
- Correct as of 17 October 2015
Medal record
Men's Rugby union
Representing France
Rugby World Cup
Silver medal – second place	2011 New Zealand	Squad

Thierry Dusautoir ([tjɛ.ʁi dy.so.twaʁ]; born 18 November 1981) is a French former rugby union player who last played for France at international level and Toulouse in the French Top 14 club competition. He was called the "Dark Destroyer" during his career. Dusautoir was considered a strong ball carrier and possessed incredibly powerful and effective tackling. He was considered the best tackler in the world during his career.

He first played for Bordeaux-Bègles before moving to US Colomiers for one season, and then signed with Biarritz. He played in the final of the 2005–06 Heineken Cup at Millennium Stadium in Cardiff, which Biarritz lost to Irish team Munster 23–19. Despite losing the Heineken Cup, Biarritz did win the final of the 2005–06 Top 14 40–13 against Toulouse. He was however part of the side that won the 2010 Heineken Cup final.

Dusautoir captained France to the 2011 Rugby World Cup final against New Zealand. France ended up losing by a score of 7–8. However Dusautoir was named as the Man of the Match for his performance in the final.

Dusautoir was the World Rugby Player of the Year in 2011, the second French player to win the award. He owns the record of most tackles in an international rugby game (38 tackles against New Zealand in 2007). He was inducted into the World Rugby Hall of Fame in 2023. Richie McCaw considered Dusautoir to be one of the toughest opponents he played against.

== International career ==
Dusautoir was called up into the French squad for tests during June 2006 against Romania and the Springboks.

He made his debut for France in a test against Romania on 17 June 2006 at Cotroceni Stadium in Bucharest, Romania, which saw France defeat the Romanians 62–14 and Dusautoir scoring a try on his debut. He played in the subsequent match against the Springboks at Newlands Stadium in Cape Town with France again emerging as the victors. He left Biarritz and signed for Toulouse in 2006.

He is perhaps most famous for his try against New Zealand in the quarter-final of the 2007 World Cup in Cardiff in which he famously made 38 tackles, two more than the entire All Blacks side. He held the record outright for 19-years until it was equalled by Wales lock Dafydd Jenkins in November 2026, also against New Zealand. His second-half score helped France to a 20–18 victory over the tournament favourites, despite the fact that he was not in the original 30-man squad and was only called up as a replacement for the injured Elvis Vermeulen. He also captained France to a famous 27–22 win over New Zealand in Dunedin on 13 June 2009. He was linked with Leinster Rugby where he would have replaced Rocky Elsom.

=== 2011 Rugby World Cup ===
Dusautoir captained France to the 2011 Rugby World Cup final against the hosts New Zealand, in which he scored France's only try (one of two for the entire game) in the 47th minute (New Zealand's Tony Woodcock scoring the other for the All Blacks) and made 22 tackles, for which he received the Man of the Match award. On the night of the final, one could hear chants of "Dusautoir" coming from the many bars showing the game around the Auckland waterfront. He was named the 2011 IRB International Player of the Year, thus becoming the second player from France to win the award after former captain Fabien Galthié in 2002. Dusautoir won the award over players such as Jerome Kaino and Ma'a Nonu.

In an interview on Total Rugby in July 2012, Dusautoir spoke about a perceived lack of respect towards his team during the 2011 World Cup. He cited a particular picture from the New Zealand Herald in the week leading up to the final which showed Sonny Bill Williams and Israel Dagg laughing during training, with the caption '80 minutes before laughing'. Dusautoir also shared about how France's uncomplicated game plan in the final nearly resulted in a memorable upset:

Our strategy in that match was to resist as long as possible. Having seen the way we were playing throughout the tournament we were aware that we were not at the same level as the All Blacks. That was pretty obvious. But by this time we were sure we were mentally prepared and we were ready to make the most of the opportunity... During the match we played well but we would have liked to have scored a drop goal on top of the great defence we produced. But we played an uncomplicated game and that is ultimately how we managed to surprise them so much.

=== 2012–2015 ===
France's new head coach Philippe Saint-André retained Dusautoir as captain for the 2012 Six Nations Championship, in which France finished fourth.

On 21 October 2012, in a Heineken Cup match against Treviso, Dusautoir twisted his knee in a tackle, suffering a twisted lateral ligament with a slight tear. The injury is expected to sideline him for four to six weeks, meaning that he would miss the 2012 November Tests.

On 11 January 2013, Dusautoir was named in the initial training squad for the 2013 Six Nations Championship, but Saint-André decided to retain Pascal Papé as captain in order to give Dusautoir time to ease his way back into the international team.

Dusautoir lead France to the knockout rounds of the 2015 Rugby World Cup, where they played against New Zealand in the quarter-finals, losing 62–13. Dusautoir announced his retirement from international rugby following the tournament.

He is the second French captain after Fabien Pelous to have beaten Australia, New Zealand and South Africa.

=== International tries ===
#	Date	Venue	Opponent	Result (F–A)	Competition
1	17 June 2006	Cotroceni Stadium, Bucharest, Romania	Romania	62–14	Test Match
2	16 September 2007	Stadium Municipal, Toulouse, France	Namibia	87–10	2007 Rugby World Cup
3	6 October 2007	Millennium Stadium, Cardiff, Wales	New Zealand	20–18	2007 Rugby World Cup
4	25 February 2009	Stade de France, Saint-Denis, France	Wales	21–16	2009 Six Nations Championship
5	21 November 2009	Stade de France, Saint-Denis, France	Samoa	43–5	Test Match
6	23 October 2011	Eden Park, Auckland, New Zealand	New Zealand	7–8	2011 Rugby World Cup final

== Honours ==
=== Club ===
Biarritz

- French Champions (2): 2005, 2006
- Heineken Cup runner-up: 2006

Toulouse

- French Champions (3): 2008, 2011, 2012
- Heineken Cup winner: 2010
- Heineken Cup runner-up: 2008

=== International ===
- Rugby World Cup runner-up: 2011
- Six Nations champion: 2010
- Grand Slam winner: 2010

=== Individual ===
- World Rugby Player of the Year: 2011

== Personal life ==
Dusautoir was born in Abidjan, Ivory Coast. He has a French father and Ivorian mother. He did not take up rugby until he was 16; before that, his favourite sport was judo, which he almost chose as his career, having done it for 13 years and becoming a double brown belt, before switching to rugby.

He is a graduate chemical engineer. He also studied in MBA program at Emlyon business school.

Preceded by Lionel Nallet	French national rugby union captain 2009–2015	Succeeded by Guilhem Guirado
