= Marc Lièvremont =

France international rugby union player (born 1968)

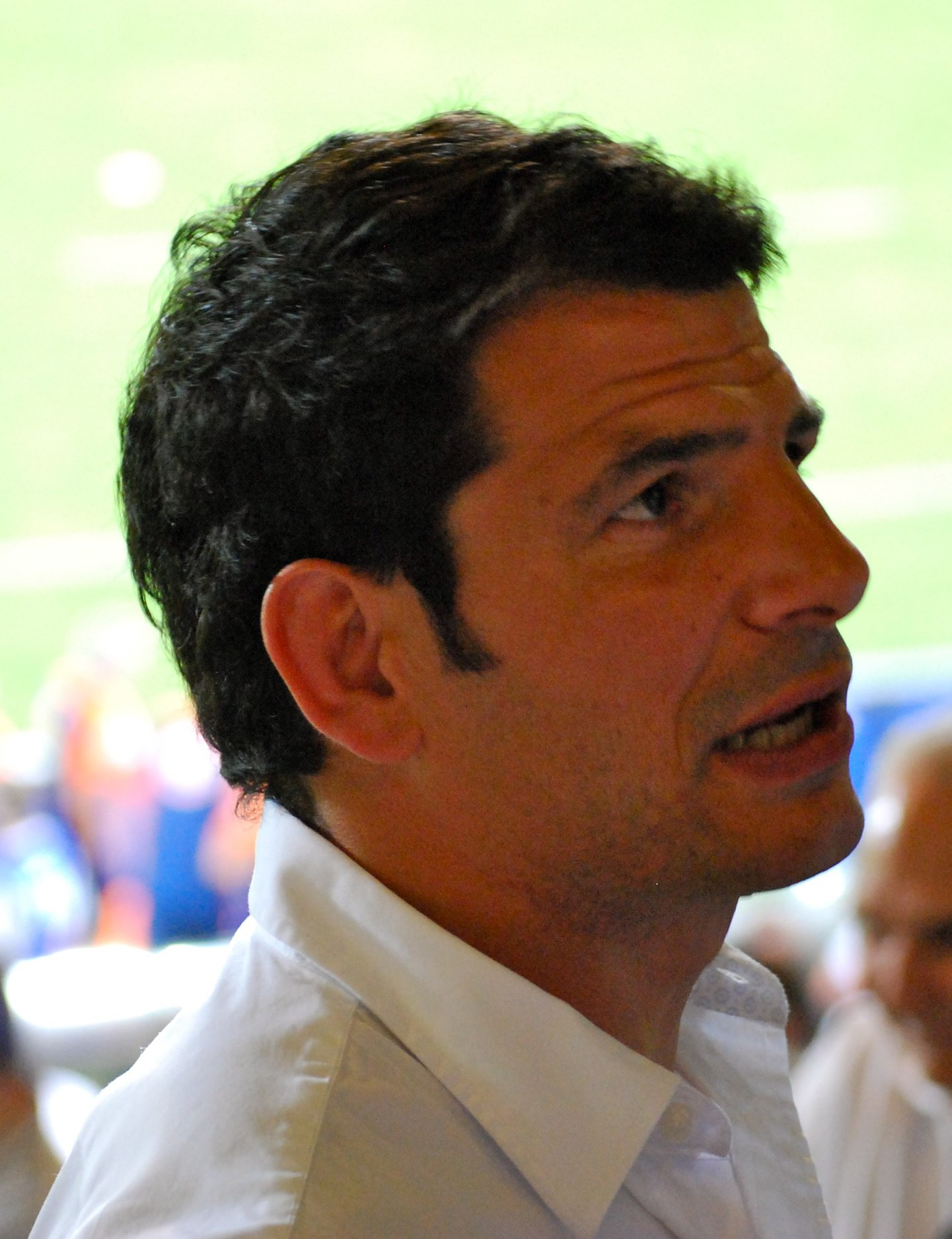
- Born: 28 October 1968 (age 58) Dakar, Senegal
- Height: 1.83 m (6 ft 0 in)
- Weight: 92 kg (14 st 7 lb)
- Notable relative(s): Thomas Lièvremont (brother), Matthieu Lièvremont (brother)

Rugby union career
- Position: Flanker
Senior career
Years	Team	Apps	(Points)
1974–1988	ÉS Catalane		
1988–1997	Perpignan		
1997–2000	Stade Français		
2000–2002	Biarritz Olympique		
International career
Years	Team	Apps	(Points)
1995–1999	France	25	(25)
Coaching career
- Years: Team
- 2003–2005: France U21
- 2005–2007: Dax
- 2007–2011: France

Marc Lièvremont (born 28 October 1968) is a former rugby union footballer and was the head coach of the French national rugby union team. He played as a back-row forward for France, gaining 25 caps from 1995 to 1999, and was selected in France's 1999 Rugby World Cup squad. He also played with the French Rugby Sevens team and with the French Barbarians.

Born 28 October 1968 in Dakar, Senegal to a military father from the Franche-Comté and a mother from Lorraine, he was raised in Argelès-sur-Mer with his six younger brothers and one younger sister who all play or played rugby at different high levels. Two are or have been international rugby players: Thomas (who was also part of France's 1999 Rugby World Cup squad and is now coach of Dax) and Matthieu. The only girl of the family, Claire, was a semi-professional, winning a French Championship with Toulouges in 2005. The two younger twins, Pierre and Luc are also playing for l'Avenir Castanéen, a Fédérale 2 side (4th Division), as a centre and openside flanker respectively. Finally, François used to play for USA Perpignan, during the 1990s.

Lièvremont began his rugby career with amateur club Étoile sportive catalane. He then played for Perpignan, Stade Français (Top 14), in 1998 and 2000, as well as Biarritz Olympique.

After retiring from rugby, Lièvremont turned to coaching at US Dax, whom he guided to promotion to the Top 14 in 2007. In a surprise move, French Rugby Federation president Bernard Lapasset, who is now chairman of the IRB, appointed Lièvremont as the new head coach of the French national side after the 2007 Rugby World Cup, replacing Bernard Laporte. As assistants, former French teammate Émile Ntamack was appointed to coach the backs, while Didier Retière was nominated as the new forwards coach.

In 2010 Lièvremont coached France to win the 2010 Six Nations Championship and Grand Slam beating England 12–10. The following year, however, pressure began to mount on him after Six Nation losses to England 17–9 and Italy 22–21 – the latter of which was the first time Italy had beaten France, and came after France had led by twelve points with twenty minutes remaining and the next week France beat Wales 28–9. At the 2011 Rugby World Cup, he guided France to the final where they played hosts New Zealand, losing 8–7 after a very well played game. Lièvremont branded a section of his squad "spoilt brats" after he discovered some players went out to celebrate the semi-final win against Wales. He also did not make an appearance for the after-match interview, sending his assistant instead. However, veteran back-rower Imanol Harinordoquy, who publicly criticized Lièvremont during the tournament for browbeating the team in the media, indicated after the tournament that the team had rebelled against him after the pool stage, and had effectively managed themselves in the knockout rounds.

== Honours ==
(France) Stade Français

- French Rugby Union Championship/Top 14: 1997–98

== Notes and references ==
Sporting positions
Preceded by (France) Bernard Laporte	French National Rugby Union Coach; 2007–2011	Succeeded by (France) Philippe Saint-André
