= 2007 Six Nations Championship squads =

Rugby union competition squads

== England ==
Head Coach: Brian Ashton

Note: Flags indicate national union for the club/province as defined by World Rugby.

Player	Position	Date of birth (age)	Caps	Club/province
George Chuter	Hooker	9 July 1976		(England) Leicester
Lee Mears	Hooker	5 March 1979		(England) Bath
Perry Freshwater	Prop	27 July 1973		(France) Perpignan
Tim Payne	Prop	29 April 1979		(England) London Wasps
Stuart Turner	Prop	23 April 1972		(England) Sale
Phil Vickery (c)	Prop	14 March 1976		(England) London Wasps
Julian White	Prop	14 May 1973		(England) Leicester
Louis Deacon	Lock	7 October 1980		(England) Leicester
Danny Grewcock	Lock	7 November 1972		(England) Bath
Tom Palmer	Lock	27 March 1979		(England) London Wasps
Martin Corry	Back row	12 October 1973		(England) Leicester
Nick Easter	Back row	15 August 1978		(England) Harlequins
James Haskell	Back row	2 April 1985		(England) London Wasps
Magnus Lund	Back row	25 June 1983		(England) Sale
Tom Rees	Back row	11 September 1984		(England) London Wasps
Joe Worsley	Back row	14 June 1977		(England) London Wasps
Harry Ellis	Scrum-half	17 May 1982		(England) Leicester
Shaun Perry	Scrum-half	4 May 1978		(England) Bristol
Peter Richards	Scrum-half	10 March 1978		(England) Gloucester
Toby Flood	Fly-half	8 August 1985		(England) Newcastle
Shane Geraghty	Fly-half	12 August 1986		(England) London Irish
Jonny Wilkinson	Fly-half	25 May 1979		(England) Newcastle
Mike Catt	Centre	17 September 1971		(England) London Irish
Andy Farrell	Centre	30 May 1975		(England) Saracens
Jamie Noon	Centre	9 May 1979		(England) Newcastle
Mathew Tait	Centre	6 February 1986		(England) Newcastle
Mike Tindall	Centre	18 October 1978		(England) Gloucester
Mark Cueto	Wing	26 December 1979		(England) Sale
Jason Robinson	Wing	30 July 1974		(England) Sale
David Strettle	Wing	23 July 1983		(England) Harlequins
Iain Balshaw	Fullback	18 April 1978		(England) Gloucester
Josh Lewsey	Fullback	30 November 1976		(England) London Wasps
Olly Morgan	Fullback	3 November 1985		(England) Gloucester

== France ==
Head Coach: Bernard Laporte

Note: Flags indicate national union for the club/province as defined by World Rugby.

Player	Position	Date of birth (age)	Caps	Club/province
Benoît August	Hooker	20 December 1976		(France) Biarritz
Sébastien Bruno	Hooker	26 August 1974		(England) Sale
Raphaël Ibañez (c)	Hooker	17 February 1973		(England) London Wasps
Dimitri Szarzewski	Hooker	26 January 1983		(France) Stade Français
Pieter de Villiers	Prop	3 July 1972		(France) Stade Français
Sylvain Marconnet	Prop	8 April 1976		(France) Stade Français
Olivier Milloud	Prop	9 December 1975		(France) Bourgoin
Nicolas Mas	Prop	25 May 1980		(France) Perpignan
Gregory Lamboley	Lock	12 January 1982		(France) Toulouse
Lionel Nallet	Lock	14 September 1976		(France) Castres
Pascal Papé	Lock	5 December 1980		(France) Stade Français
Jérôme Thion	Lock	2 December 1977		(France) Biarritz
Serge Betsen	Flanker	25 March 1974		(France) Biarritz
Julien Bonnaire	Flanker	20 September 1978		(France) Clermont
Sébastien Chabal	Number 8	8 December 1977		(England) Sale
Imanol Harinordoquy	Number 8	20 February 1980		(France) Biarritz
Elvis Vermeulen	Number 8	5 April 1979		(France) Clermont
Jean-Baptiste Élissalde	Scrum-half	23 November 1979		(France) Toulouse
Pierre Mignoni	Scrum-half	28 February 1977		(France) Clermont
Dimitri Yachvili	Scrum-half	19 September 1980		(France) Biarritz
Lionel Beauxis	Fly-half	24 October 1985		(France) Stade Français
David Skrela	Fly-half	2 March 1979		(France) Stade Français
Florian Fritz	Centre	17 January 1984		(France) Toulouse
Yannick Jauzion	Centre	28 July 1978		(France) Toulouse
David Marty	Centre	30 October 1982		(France) Perpignan
Damien Traille	Centre	12 June 1979		(France) Biarritz
Vincent Clerc	Wing	7 May 1981		(France) Toulouse
Christophe Dominici	Wing	20 May 1972		(France) Stade Français
Aurélien Rougerie	Wing	26 September 1980		(France) Clermont
Cédric Heymans	Fullback	20 July 1978		(France) Toulouse
Clément Poitrenaud	Fullback	20 May 1982		(France) Toulouse

== Ireland ==
Head Coach: Eddie O'Sullivan

Note: Flags indicate national union for the club/province as defined by World Rugby.

Player	Position	Date of birth (age)	Caps	Club/province
Rory Best	Hooker	15 August 1982		(Ireland) Ulster
Jerry Flannery	Hooker	17 October 1978		(Ireland) Munster
Simon Best	Prop	11 February 1978		(Ireland) Ulster
John Hayes	Prop	2 November 1973		(Ireland) Munster
Marcus Horan	Prop	7 September 1977		(Ireland) Munster
Bryan Young	Prop	11 June 1981		(Ireland) Ulster
Trevor Hogan	Lock	19 November 1979		(Ireland) Leinster
Donncha O'Callaghan	Lock	23 March 1979		(Ireland) Munster
Paul O'Connell	Lock	20 October 1979		(Ireland) Munster
Mick O'Driscoll	Lock	8 October 1978		(Ireland) Munster
Neil Best	Back row	3 April 1979		(Ireland) Ulster
Simon Easterby	Back row	21 July 1975		(Wales) Scarlets
David Wallace	Back row	8 July 1976		(Ireland) Munster
Denis Leamy	Back row	27 November 1981		(Ireland) Munster
Issac Boss	Scrum-half	9 April 1980		(Ireland) Ulster
Eoin Reddan	Scrum-half	20 November 1980		(England) Wasps
Peter Stringer	Scrum-half	13 December 1977		(Ireland) Munster
Ronan O'Gara	Fly-half	7 March 1977		(Ireland) Munster
Paddy Wallace	Fly-half	27 August 1979		(Ireland) Ulster
Gordon D'Arcy	Centre	10 February 1980		(Ireland) Leinster
Brian O'Driscoll (c)	Centre	21 January 1979		(Ireland) Leinster
Denis Hickie	Wing	13 February 1976		(Ireland) Leinster
Shane Horgan	Wing	18 July 1978		(Ireland) Leinster
Andrew Trimble	Wing	20 October 1984		(Ireland) Ulster
Girvan Dempsey	Fullback	2 October 1975		(Ireland) Leinster
Geordan Murphy	Fullback	19 April 1978		(England) Leicester

== Italy ==
Head coach: (France) Pierre Berbizier

1. Gonzalo Padro
2. Mauro Bergamasco
3. Mirco Bergamasco
4. Valerio Bernabò
5. Marco Bortolami
6. Gonzalo Canale
7. Martin Castrogiovanni
8. David Dal Maso
9. Roland de Marigny
10. Santiago Dellapè
11. Carlo Festuccia
12. Ezio Galon
13. Leonardo Ghiraldini
14. Paul Griffen
15. Andrea Lo Cicero
16. Roberto Mandelli
17. Andrea Masi
18. Walter Pozzebon
19. Fabio Ongaro
20. Sergio Parisse
21. Salvatore Perugini
22. Ramiro Pez
23. Matteo Pratichetti
24. Kaine Robertson
25. Andrea Scanavacca
26. Josh Sole
27. Fabio Staibano
28. Alessandro Troncon
29. Matteo Mazzantini
30. Alessandro Zanni

== Scotland ==
Head coach: Frank Hadden

Note: Flags indicate national union for the club/province as defined by World Rugby.

Player	Position	Date of birth (age)	Caps	Club/province
Ross Ford	Hooker	23 April 1984		(Scotland) Border Reivers
Dougie Hall	Hooker	24 September 1980		(Scotland) Edinburgh
Allan Jacobsen	Prop	22 September 1978		(Scotland) Edinburgh
Gavin Kerr	Prop	3 April 1977		(Scotland) Border Reivers
Euan Murray	Prop	7 August 1980		(Scotland) Glasgow
James Hamilton	Lock	17 November 1982		(England) Leicester
Nathan Hines	Lock	29 November 1976		(France) Perpignan
Alastair Kellock	Lock	14 June 1981		(Scotland) Glasgow
Scott Murray	Lock	15 January 1976		(Scotland) Edinburgh
Kelly Brown	Flanker	8 June 1982		(Scotland) Glasgow
Ally Hogg	Flanker	20 July 1983		(Scotland) Edinburgh
Johnnie Beattie	Number 8	21 November 1985		(Scotland) Glasgow
David Callam	Number 8	15 February 1983		(Scotland) Edinburgh
Simon Taylor	Number 8	17 August 1979		(Scotland) Edinburgh
Chris Cusiter	Scrum-half	13 June 1982		(France) Perpignan
Rory Lawson	Scrum-half	12 March 1981		(England) Gloucester
Phil Godman	Fly-half	20 May 1982		(Scotland) Edinburgh
Dan Parks	Fly-half	26 May 1978		(Scotland) Glasgow
Marcus Di Rollo	Centre	31 March 1978		(Scotland) Edinburgh
Rob Dewey	Centre	19 October 1983		(Scotland) Edinburgh
Andrew Henderson	Centre	3 February 1980		(Scotland) Glasgow
Sean Lamont	Wing	15 January 1981		(England) Northampton
Chris Paterson	Wing	30 March 1978		(Scotland) Edinburgh
Nikki Walker	Wing	5 March 1982		(Wales) Ospreys
Simon Webster	Wing	8 March 1981		(Scotland) Edinburgh
Rory Lamont	Fullback	10 March 1982		(Scotland) Glasgow
Hugo Southwell	Fullback	14 May 1980		(Scotland) Edinburgh

== Wales ==
Head coach: Gareth Jenkins

1. Aled Brew
2. Lee Byrne
3. Brent Cockbain
4. Chris Czekaj
5. Ian Gough
6. James Hook
7. Chris Horsman
8. Gethin Jenkins
9. Adam Jones
10. Alun Wyn Jones
11. Duncan Jones
12. Mark Jones
13. Ryan Jones
14. Stephen Jones
15. Hal Luscombe
16. Kevin Morgan
17. Dwayne Peel
18. Mike Phillips
19. Alix Popham
20. Matthew Rees
21. Jamie Robinson
22. Tom Shanklin
23. Robert Sidoli
24. Ceri Sweeney
25. Gareth Thomas
26. Gavin Thomas
27. Jonathan Thomas
28. T. Rhys Thomas
29. Martyn Williams
30. Shane Williams

== Notes and references ==
- RBS Six Nations Squads
