= 2006 end-of-year rugby union internationals =

The 2006 end of year tests, also known as the 2006 Autumn Internationals, refers to several international rugby union matches that took place during November 2006 principally between touring teams from the southern hemisphere – Australia, Argentina, New Zealand, the Pacific Islands and South Africa – and one or more teams from the Six Nations Championship: England, France, Ireland, Italy, Scotland and Wales. Canada and Romania also played Six Nations teams during this period.

Ireland's games were the last Tests to be played at Lansdowne Road before it was closed for redevelopment.

== Tours ==
Team/Tour	Opponents
Argentina in Europe	England (won) – Italy (won) – France (lost)
Australia in Europe	Wales (drawn) – Italy (won) – Ireland (lost) – Scotland (won)
Canada in Europe	Wales (lost) – Italy (lost)
Pacific Islanders in the British and Irish Isles	Wales (lost) – Scotland (lost) – Ireland (lost)
New Zealand in Europe	England (won) – France (2 test won) – Wales (won)
Romania in Scotland	Scotland (lost)
South Africa in the British and Irish Isles	Ireland (lost) – England (1 won, 1 lost)

== Week 1 ==
4 November 2006
14:30 GMT

Wales	29–29	Australia
Try: S. Williams; M. Williams; Con: Hook (2); Pen: S. Jones; Henson; Hook (3)	Report	Try: Shepherd (2); Giteau; Latham; Con: Giteau (3); Pen: Giteau

Millennium Stadium, Cardiff
Attendance: 74,158
Referee: Steve Walsh (New Zealand)

FB	15	Kevin Morgan
RW	14	Gareth Thomas
OC	13	Tom Shanklin
IC	12	Gavin Henson
LW	11	Shane Williams
FH	10	Stephen Jones (c)	(substituted off) 25'
SH	9	Dwayne Peel
N8	8	Ryan Jones
OF	7	Martyn Williams
BF	6	Jonathan Thomas
RL	5	Ian Gough
LL	4	Ian Evans
TP	3	Adam Jones	(substituted off) 69'
HK	2	Matthew Rees
LP	1	Gethin Jenkins
Replacements:
HK	16	T. Rhys Thomas
PR	17	Duncan Jones	(substituted on) 69'
LK	18	Alun Wyn Jones
FL	19	Gavin Thomas
SH	20	Mike Phillips
FH	21	James Hook	(substituted on) 25'
WG	22	Mark Jones
Coach:
(Wales) Gareth Jenkins

FB	15	Chris Latham
RW	14	Clyde Rathbone
OC	13	Lote Tuqiri
IC	12	Stephen Larkham	(substituted off) 60'
LW	11	Cameron Shepherd
FH	10	Mat Rogers
SH	9	Matt Giteau
N8	8	Wycliff Palu	(substituted off) 56'
OF	7	Phil Waugh (c)
BF	6	Rocky Elsom
RL	5	Dan Vickerman	(substituted off) 77'
LL	4	Nathan Sharpe
TP	3	Rodney Blake
HK	2	Tai McIsaac	(substituted off) 36'
LP	1	Al Baxter
Replacements:
HK	16	Brendan Cannon	(substituted on) 36'
PR	17	Benn Robinson
LK	18	Mark Chisholm	(substituted on) 77'
N8	19	Stephen Hoiles	(substituted on) 56'
FH	20	Josh Valentine	(substituted on) 60'
CE	21	Mark Gerrard
FB	22	Adam Ashley-Cooper
Coach:
(Australia) John Connolly

Touch judges:
Paul Honiss (New Zealand)
Bryce Lawrence (New Zealand)
Television match official:
Kelvin Deaker (New Zealand)

5 November 2006
15:00 GMT

England	20–41	New Zealand
Try: Noon; Cohen; Perry; Con: Hodgson; Pen: Hodgson	Report	Try: Mauger; Rokocoko; Hayman; Carter; Con: Carter (3); Pen: Carter (5)

Twickenham Stadium, London
Attendance: 82,076
Referee: Joël Jutge (France)

FB	15	Iain Balshaw
RW	14	Paul Sackey
OC	13	Jamie Noon
IC	12	Anthony Allen
LW	11	Ben Cohen
FH	10	Charlie Hodgson
SH	9	Shaun Perry	(substituted off) 66'
N8	8	Pat Sanderson	(substituted off) 60'
OF	7	Lewis Moody
BF	6	Martin Corry (c)
RL	5	Ben Kay
LL	4	Danny Grewcock
TP	3	Julian White
HK	2	George Chuter	(substituted off) 75'
LP	1	Andrew Sheridan
Replacements:
HK	16	Lee Mears	(substituted on) 75'
PR	17	Stuart Turner
LK	18	Chris Jones
FL	19	Magnus Lund	(substituted on) 60'
SH	20	Peter Richards	(substituted on) 66'
FH	21	Andy Goode
FB	22	Mark van Gisbergen
Coach:
(England) Andy Robinson

FB	15	Mils Muliaina
RW	14	Rico Gear		(substituted off) 70'
OC	13	Ma'a Nonu
IC	12	Aaron Mauger
LW	11	Joe Rokocoko
FH	10	Dan Carter
SH	9	Byron Kelleher		(substituted off) 68'
N8	8	Chris Masoe	(yellow card) 64' to 74'
OF	7	Richie McCaw (c)
BF	6	Reuben Thorne		(substituted off) 72'
RL	5	Keith Robinson
LL	4	Chris Jack
TP	3	Carl Hayman		(substituted off) 75'
HK	2	Keven Mealamu		(substituted off) 75'
LP	1	Tony Woodcock		(substituted off) 72'
Replacements:
HK	16	Andrew Hore		(substituted on) 75'
PR	17	John Afoa		(substituted on) 75'
LK	18	Clarke Dermody		(substituted on) 72'
N8	19	Rodney So'oialo		(substituted on) 72'
FH	20	Andy Ellis		(substituted on) 68'
CE	21	Leon MacDonald
FB	22	Sitiveni Sivivatu		(substituted on) 70'
Coach:
(New Zealand) Graham Henry

Touch judges:
Stuart Dickinson (Australia)
Matt Goddard (Australia)
Television match official:
Christophe Berdos (France)

The attendance for this game was a stadium record.

== Week 2 ==
11 November 2006
14:30 GMT

England	18–25	Argentina
Try: Sackey; Balshaw; Con: Hodgson; Pen: Hodgson; Flood	Report	Try: Todeschini; Con: Todeschini; Pen: Contepomi (2); Todeschini (4)

Twickenham Stadium, London
Attendance: 74,027
Referee: Kelvin Deaker (New Zealand)

FB	15	Iain Balshaw
RW	14	Paul Sackey		(substituted off) 55'
OC	13	Jamie Noon
IC	12	Anthony Allen
LW	11	Ben Cohen
FH	10	Charlie Hodgson		(substituted off) 53'
SH	9	Shaun Perry		(substituted off) 47'
N8	8	Pat Sanderson		(substituted off) 74'
OF	7	Lewis Moody	8' to 12'
BF	6	Martin Corry (c)
RL	5	Ben Kay
LL	4	Danny Grewcock		(substituted off) 51'
TP	3	Julian White
HK	2	George Chuter		(substituted off) 74'
LP	1	Perry Freshwater
Replacements:
HK	16	Lee Mears		(substituted on) 74'
PR	17	Stuart Turner
LK	18	Tom Palmer		(substituted on) 51'
FL	19	Magnus Lund		(substituted on) 8'	(substituted off) 12'	(substituted on) 74'
SH	20	Peter Richards		(substituted on) 47'
FH	21	Toby Flood		(substituted on) 53'
FB	22	Josh Lewsey		(substituted on) 55'
Coach:
(England) Andy Robinson

FB	15	Juan Martín Hernández
RW	14	José María Núñez Piossek
OC	13	Miguel Avramovic	(substituted off) 61'
IC	12	Gonzalo Tiesi	(substituted off) 25'
LW	11	Pablo Gómez Cora
FH	10	Felipe Contepomi
SH	9	Agustín Pichot (c)
N8	8	Gonzalo Longo
OF	7	Juan Manuel Leguizamón	(substituted off) 70'
BF	6	Juan Martín Fernández Lobbe
RL	5	Patricio Albacete
LL	4	Ignacio Fernández Lobbe	(substituted off) 61'
TP	3	Omar Hasan	(substituted off) 69'
HK	2	Mario Ledesma
LP	1	Marcos Ayerza
Replacements:
HK	16	Alberto Vernet Basualdo
PR	17	Martín Scelzo	(substituted on) 69'
LK	18	Esteban Lozada	(substituted on) 61'
N8	19	Martín Schusterman	(substituted on) 70'
FH	20	Nicolás Fernández Miranda
CE	21	Federico Todeschini	(substituted on) 25'
FB	22	Horacio Agulla	(substituted on) 61'
Coach:
(Argentina) Marcelo Loffreda

Touch judges:
Steve Walsh (New Zealand)
Malcolm Changleng (Scotland)
Television match official:
Peter Allan (Scotland)

- This was Argentina's first victory against a reigning Rugby World Cup holder, a record which stood until September 2024 when they defeated South Africa.

11 November 2006
21:00 CET

France	3–47	New Zealand
Drop: Fritz	Report	Try: Sivivatu (2); McCaw; Carter; Smith; Rokocoko; McAlister; Con: Carter (3); Pen: Carter (2)

Stade de Gerland, Lyon
Attendance: 42,393
Referee: Stuart Dickinson (Australia)

FB	15	Julien Laharrague
RW	14	Aurélien Rougerie
OC	13	Florian Fritz	(substituted off) 70'
IC	12	Yannick Jauzion
LW	11	Christophe Dominici
FH	10	Damien Traille
SH	9	Dimitri Yachvili	(substituted off) 78'
N8	8	Elvis Vermeulen
OF	7	Julien Bonnaire
BF	6	Thierry Dusautoir	(substituted off) 64'
RL	5	Pascal Papé
LL	4	Fabien Pelous (c)	(substituted off) 51'
TP	3	Pieter de Villiers
HK	2	Dimitri Szarzewski	(substituted off) 45'
LP	1	Sylvain Marconnet	(substituted off) 45'
Replacements:
HK	16	Raphaël Ibañez	(substituted on) 45'
PR	17	Olivier Milloud	(substituted on) 45'
LK	18	Lionel Nallet	(substituted on) 51'
FL	19	Rémy Martin	(substituted on) 64'
SH	20	Jean-Baptiste Élissalde	(substituted on) 78'
CE	21	David Marty	(substituted on) 70'
FB	22	Cédric Heymans
Coach:
(France) Bernard Laporte

FB	15	Leon MacDonald	(substituted off) 74'
RW	14	Joe Rokocoko
OC	13	Conrad Smith
IC	12	Luke McAlister
LW	11	Sitiveni Sivivatu
FH	10	Dan Carter	(substituted off) 60'
SH	9	Piri Weepu	(substituted off) 55'
N8	8	Rodney So'oialo
OF	7	Richie McCaw (c)	(substituted off) 57'
BF	6	Jerry Collins
RL	5	Ali Williams
LL	4	James Ryan
TP	3	Carl Hayman
HK	2	Anton Oliver	(substituted off) 49'
LP	1	Tony Woodcock	(substituted off) 67'
Replacements:
HK	16	Keven Mealamu	(substituted on) 49'
PR	17	Neemia Tialata	(substituted on) 67'
LK	18	Jason Eaton	(substituted on) 57'
N8	19	Chris Masoe
FH	20	Byron Kelleher	(substituted on) 55'
CE	21	Ma'a Nonu	(substituted on) 60'
FB	22	Mils Muliaina	(substituted on) 74'
Coach:
(New Zealand) Graham Henry

11 November 2006
17:00 WET

Ireland	32–15	South Africa
Try: Trimble; D. Wallace; Horan; Horgan; Con: O'Gara (3); Pen: O'Gara (2)	Report	Try: F. Steyn; Habana; Con: A. Pretorius; Pen: A. Pretorius

Lansdowne Road, Dublin
Attendance: 43,000
Referee: Paul Honiss (New Zealand)

FB	15	Girvan Dempsey
RW	14	Shane Horgan
OC	13	Brian O'Driscoll (c)
IC	12	Gordon D'Arcy
LW	11	Andrew Trimble	(substituted off) 67'
FH	10	Ronan O'Gara	(substituted off) 79'
SH	9	Peter Stringer	(substituted off) 75'
N8	8	Denis Leamy
OF	7	David Wallace
BF	6	Neil Best	(substituted off) 61'
RL	5	Paul O'Connell	(substituted off) 79'
LL	4	Donncha O'Callaghan
TP	3	John Hayes
HK	2	Rory Best	(substituted off) 79'
LP	1	Marcus Horan	(substituted off) 67'
Replacements:
HK	16	Frankie Sheahan	(substituted on) 79'
PR	17	Bryan Young	(substituted on) 67'
LK	18	Malcolm O'Kelly	(substituted on) 79'
FL	19	Simon Easterby	(substituted on) 61'
SH	20	Isaac Boss	(substituted on) 75'
FH	21	Paddy Wallace	(substituted on) 79'
WG	22	Geordan Murphy	(substituted on) 67'
Coach:
(Ireland) Eddie O'Sullivan

FB	15	Bevin Fortuin
RW	14	Jaco Pretorius		(substituted off) 75'
OC	13	Bryan Habana
IC	12	Jean de Villiers
LW	11	François Steyn
FH	10	André Pretorius
SH	9	Ricky Januarie	4' to 9'
N8	8	Pierre Spies
OF	7	Juan Smith
BF	6	Danie Rossouw		(substituted off) 67'
RL	5	Albert van den Berg
LL	4	Johan Ackermann		(substituted off) 14'
TP	3	CJ van der Linde
HK	2	John Smit (c)
LP	1	Lawrence Sephaka		(substituted off) 40'
Replacements:
HK	16	Chiliboy Ralepelle
PR	17	BJ Botha		(substituted on) 40'
LK	18	Johann Muller		(substituted on) 14'
N8	19	Jacques Cronjé		(substituted on) 67'
FH	20	Ruan Pienaar		(substituted on) 4'	(substituted off) 9'
CE	21	Wynand Olivier		(substituted on) 75'
FB	22	JP Pietersen
Coach:
(South Africa) Jake White

Touch judges:
Bryce Lawrence (New Zealand)
Taizo Hirabayashi (Japan)
Television match official:
David Changleng (Scotland)

- South Africa played in kits similar to those worn by the 1906 touring squad, which was captained by Paul Roos.

11 November 2006
15:00 CET

Italy	18–25	Australia
Pen: Pez (6)	Report	Try: Rogers; Shepherdson; Mortlock; Con: Mortlock (2); Pen: Mortlock (2)

Stadio Flaminio, Rome
Attendance: 22,000
Referee: Nigel Owens (Wales)

FB	15	Gert Peens
RW	14	Kaine Robertson
OC	13	Gonzalo Canale
IC	12	Mirco Bergamasco
LW	11	Pablo Canavosio
FH	10	Ramiro Pez
SH	9	Paul Griffen
N8	8	Sergio Parisse
OF	7	Mauro Bergamasco
BF	6	Alessandro Zanni
RL	5	Marco Bortolami (c)
LL	4	Santiago Dellapè
TP	3	Martin Castrogiovanni
HK	2	Carlo Festuccia
LP	1	Andrea Lo Cicero
Replacements:
HK	16	Leonardo Ghiraldini
PR	17	Carlos Nieto	Substituted on
LK	18	Carlo Del Fava
FL	19	Josh Sole	Substituted on
SH	20	Simon Picone
FH	21	Andrea Scanavacca
WG	22	Walter Pozzebon
Coach:
(France) Pierre Berbizier

FB	15	Chris Latham
RW	14	Clyde Rathbone
OC	13	Stirling Mortlock (c)
IC	12	Stephen Larkham
LW	11	Lote Tuqiri
FH	10	Mat Rogers
SH	9	Matt Giteau
N8	8	Wycliff Palu
OF	7	George Smith
BF	6	Rocky Elsom
RL	5	Nathan Sharpe
LL	4	Mark Chisholm
TP	3	Guy Shepherdson
HK	2	Brendan Cannon
LP	1	Al Baxter
Replacements:
HK	16	Stephen Moore	Substituted on
PR	17	Nic Henderson	Substituted on
LK	18	Alister Campbell	Substituted on
N8	19	Stephen Hoiles
FH	20	Josh Valentine
CE	21	Mark Gerrard
FB	22	Cameron Shepherd
Coach:
(Australia) John Connolly

Touch judges:
Alan Lewis (Ireland)
Hugh Watkins (Wales)

11 November 2006
14:30 GMT

Wales	38–20	Pacific Islanders
Try: M. Jones; Hook; Morgan; Byrne; Sweeney; Con: Sweeney (5); Pen: Sweeney	Report	Try: Va'a; Mapusua; Ratuvou; Con: T. Pisi; Pen: T. Pisi

Millennium Stadium, Cardiff
Attendance: 50,769
Referee: Wayne Barnes (England)

FB	15	Kevin Morgan
RW	14	Lee Byrne	(substituted off) 60'
OC	13	Sonny Parker
IC	12	James Hook
LW	11	Mark Jones	(substituted off) 53'
FH	10	Ceri Sweeney
SH	9	Mike Phillips	(substituted off) 72'
N8	8	Alix Popham
OF	7	Gavin Thomas
BF	6	Alun Wyn Jones
RL	5	Robert Sidoli
LL	4	Michael Owen	(substituted off) 72'
TP	3	Chris Horsman	(substituted off) 56'
HK	2	T. Rhys Thomas	(substituted off) 73'
LP	1	Duncan Jones (c)
Replacements:
HK	16	Huw Bennett	(substituted on) 73'
PR	17	Adam Jones	(substituted on) 56'
PR	18	Gethin Jenkins
LK	19	Jonathan Thomas	(substituted on) 72'
SH	20	Gareth Cooper	(substituted on) 72'
CE	21	Gavin Evans	(substituted on) 60'
WG	22	Shane Williams	(substituted on) 53'
Coach:
(Wales) Gareth Jenkins

FB	15	(Fiji) Norman Ligairi
RW	14	(Samoa) Lome Fa'atau
OC	13	(Fiji) Seru Rabeni
IC	12	(Samoa) Seilala Mapusua	(substituted off) 68'
LW	11	(Samoa) Sailosi Tagicakibau	(substituted off) 19'
FH	10	(Samoa) Tusi Pisi
SH	9	(Fiji) Mosese Rauluni	(substituted off) 74'
N8	8	(Tonga) Hale T-Pole	(substituted off) 51'
OF	7	(Tonga) Nili Latu
BF	6	(Samoa) Semo Sititi
RL	5	(Samoa) Daniel Leo	(substituted off) 17'
LL	4	(Fiji) Simon Raiwalui (c)
TP	3	(Tonga) Tevita Taumoepeau	(substituted off) 68'
HK	2	(Samoa) Mahonri Schwalger	(substituted off) 58'
LP	1	(Samoa) Justin Va'a
Replacements:
HK	16	(Tonga) Aleki Lutui	(substituted on) 58'
PR	17	(Samoa) Census Johnston	(substituted on) 68'
LK	18	(Tonga) Maama Molitika	(substituted on) 17'
N8	19	(Tonga) Epi Taione	(substituted on) 51'
FH	20	(Samoa) Junior Poluleuligaga	(substituted on) 74'
CE	21	(Fiji) Seremaia Bai	(substituted on) 68'
WG	22	(Fiji) Kameli Ratuvou	(substituted on) 19'
Coach:
(New Zealand) Pat Lam

Touch judges:
Donal Courtney (Ireland)
Rob Debney (England)
Television match official:
George Clancy (Ireland)

11 November 2006
14:30 GMT

Scotland	48–6	Romania
Try: Beattie; Southwell (2); Dewey; Godman; Hall; Cusiter; Con: Godman (5); Pen: Godman	Report	Pen: Vlaicu (2)

Murrayfield Stadium, Edinburgh
Attendance: 12,128
Referee: Matt Goddard (Australia)

FB	15	Hugo Southwell	(substituted off) 66'
RW	14	Simon Webster
OC	13	Marcus Di Rollo
IC	12	Rob Dewey
LW	11	Sean Lamont
FH	10	Phil Godman
SH	9	Mike Blair	(substituted off) 60'
N8	8	Johnnie Beattie
OF	7	Kelly Brown
BF	6	Jason White (c)	(substituted off) 54'
RL	5	Scott Murray
LL	4	Nathan Hines	(substituted off) 54'
TP	3	Euan Murray	(substituted off) 54'
HK	2	Dougie Hall	(substituted off) 69'
LP	1	Gavin Kerr	(substituted off) 52'
Replacements:
HK	16	Scott Lawson	(substituted on) 69'
PR	17	Alan Jacobsen	(substituted on) 52'
PR	18	Craig Smith	(substituted on) 54'
LK	19	Jim Hamilton	(substituted on) 54'
FL	20	Dave Callam	(substituted on) 60'
SH	21	Chris Cusiter	(substituted on) 60'
FB	22	Chris Paterson	(substituted on) 66'
Coach:
(Scotland) Frank Hadden

FB	15	Florin Vlaicu
RW	14	Gabriel Brezoianu
OC	13	Catalin Dascalu	(substituted off) 52'
IC	12	Romeo Gontineac	(substituted off) 52'
LW	11	Ion Teodorescu
FH	10	Ionuț Dimofte
SH	9	Valentin Calafeteanu	(substituted off) 71'
N8	8	Ovidiu Tonița
OF	7	Cosmin Rațiu
BF	6	Florin Corodeanu	(substituted off) 62'
RL	5	Cristian Petre
LL	4	Sorin Socol (c)
TP	3	Bogdan Bălan	(substituted off) 44'
HK	2	Marius Țincu	(substituted off) 71'
LP	1	Petru Bălan	(substituted off) 68'
Replacements:
PR	16	Paulică Ion	(substituted on) 44'
HK	17	Răzvan Mavrodin	(substituted on) 71'
PR	18	Cezar Popescu	(substituted on) 68'
FL	19	Valentin Ursache	(substituted on) 62'
SH	20	Alexandru Lupu	(substituted on) 71'
CE	21	Ionuț Tofan	(substituted on) 52'
CE	22	Csaba Gál	(substituted on) 52'
Coach:
(France) Daniel Santamans

== Week 3 ==
17 November 2006
19:30 GMT

Wales	61–26	Canada
Try: G. Thomas; S. Williams; Rees; Penalty try Peel; J. Thomas (2); Sweeney; Shanklin; Con: Hook (8)	Report	Try: Pletch; Pyke; Con: Pritchard (2); Pen: Pritchard (3); Drop: Daypuck

Millennium Stadium, Cardiff
Attendance: 74,022
Referee: Tony Spreadbury (England)

FB	15	Gareth Thomas (c)
RW	14	Mark Jones
OC	13	Tom Shanklin
IC	12	Sonny Parker	(substituted off) 59'
LW	11	Shane Williams
FH	10	James Hook
SH	9	Dwayne Peel	(substituted off) 59'
N8	8	Ryan Jones
OF	7	Martyn Williams
BF	6	Jonathan Thomas	(substituted off) 70'
RL	5	Ian Evans	(substituted off) 64'
LL	4	Ian Gough
TP	3	Adam Jones		(substituted off) 64'
HK	2	Matthew Rees	(substituted off) 52'
LP	1	Gethin Jenkins	(substituted off) 52'	(substituted on) 64'
Replacements:
HK	16	T. Rhys Thomas	(substituted on) 52'
PR	17	Duncan Jones	(substituted on) 52'
LK	18	Robert Sidoli	(substituted on) 64'
FL	19	Alun Wyn Jones	(substituted on) 70'
SH	20	Mike Phillips	(substituted on) 59'
CE	21	Ceri Sweeney	(substituted on) 59'
WG	22	Lee Byrne
Coach:
(Wales) Gareth Jenkins

FB	15	Ed Fairhurst
RW	14	Mike Pyke
OC	13	Ryan Smith
IC	12	Dave Spicer	(substituted off) 40'
LW	11	James Pritchard
FH	10	Derek Daypuck
SH	9	Morgan Williams (c)	(substituted off) 67'
N8	8	Sean-Michael Stephen
OF	7	Stan McKeen
BF	6	Mike Webb
RL	5	Mike Burak
LL	4	John Tait	26' to 32'
TP	3	Forrest Gainer	(substituted off) 43'
HK	2	Mark Lawson	(substituted off) 50'
LP	1	Kevin Tkachuk
Replacements:
HK	16	Pat Riordan	(substituted on) 50'
PR	17	Dan Pletch	(substituted on) 43'
PR	18	Mike Pletch
LK	19	Stu Ault	(substituted on) 26'	(substituted off) 32'
FL	20	Aaron Carpenter
FH	21	Ander Monro	(substituted on) 40'
WG	22	Justin Mensah-Coker	(substituted on) 67'
Coach:
(Canada) Patrick Parfrey

18 November 2006
14:30 GMT

England	23–21	South Africa
Try: Cueto; Vickery; Con: Goode (2); Pen: Hodgson (2); Goode	Report	Try: James; A. Ndungane; Con: James; Pen: James (2); Drop: F. Steyn

Twickenham Stadium, London
Attendance: 81,512
Referee: Steve Walsh (New Zealand)

FB	15	Josh Lewsey
RW	14	Mark Cueto
OC	13	Mathew Tait
IC	12	Jamie Noon
LW	11	Ben Cohen
FH	10	Charlie Hodgson	(substituted off) 39'
SH	9	Peter Richards	(substituted off) 69'
N8	8	Martin Corry (c)
OF	7	Pat Sanderson	(substituted off) 57'
BF	6	Joe Worsley
RL	5	Ben Kay	(substituted off) 57'
LL	4	Tom Palmer
TP	3	Julian White
HK	2	George Chuter	(substituted off) 57'
LP	1	Andrew Sheridan	(substituted off) 49'
Replacements:
HK	16	Lee Mears	(substituted on) 57'
PR	17	Phil Vickery	(substituted on) 49'
LK	18	Chris Jones	(substituted on) 57'
FL	19	Lewis Moody	(substituted on) 57'
SH	20	Shaun Perry	(substituted on) 69'
FH	21	Andy Goode	(substituted on) 39'
FB	22	Toby Flood
Coach:
(England) Andy Robinson

FB	15	François Steyn
RW	14	Akona Ndungane
OC	13	Wynand Olivier
IC	12	Jean de Villiers
LW	11	Bryan Habana
FH	10	Butch James	(substituted off) 57'
SH	9	Ricky Januarie	(substituted off) 74'
N8	8	Jacques Cronjé	(substituted off) 40'
OF	7	Danie Rossouw
BF	6	Pierre Spies
RL	5	Johann Muller
LL	4	Johan Ackermann	(substituted off) 77'
TP	3	BJ Botha
HK	2	John Smit (c)
LP	1	CJ van der Linde	(substituted off) 69'
Replacements:
HK	16	Chiliboy Ralepelle
PR	17	Deon Carstens	(substituted on) 69'
LK	18	Albert van den Berg	(substituted on) 77'
N8	19	Hilton Lobberts	(substituted on) 40'
SH	20	Ruan Pienaar	(substituted on) 74'
FH	21	André Pretorius	(substituted on) 57'
FB	22	Bevin Fortuin
Coach:
(South Africa) Jake White

18 November 2006
14:30 GMT

Scotland	34–22	Pacific Islanders
Try: Di Rollo; Callam; Brown; Henderson; Con: Parks; Paterson (3); Pen: Paterson; Drop: Di Rollo		Try: Caucaunibuca; Ratuvou (2); Leo; Con: T. Pisi

Murrayfield Stadium, Edinburgh
Attendance: 19,000
Referee: Bryce Lawrence (New Zealand)

18 November 2006
15:00 CET

Italy	16–23	Argentina
Try: Stanojevic; Con: Bortolussi; Pen: Bortolussi (3)		Try: Todeschini; Avramovic; Con: Todeschini (2); Pen: Todeschini (3)

Stadio Flaminio, Rome
Attendance: 17,000
Referee: Craig Joubert (South Africa)

- The Italian squad included seven players born in Argentina: Pablo Canavosio, Gonzalo Canale, Ramiro Pez, Sergio Parisse, Santiago Dellapè, Martin Castrogiovanni and Carlos Nieto. Of them, six were in the starting line-up; only Carlos Nieto was on the bench.

18 November 2006
21:00 CET

France	11–23	New Zealand
Try: Heymans; Pen: Yachvili (2)		Try: Rokocoko; Nonu; Con: Carter (2); Pen: Carter (3)

Stade de France, Saint-Denis
Attendance: 82,000
Referee: Chris White (England)

19 November 2006
16:00 WET

Ireland	21–6	Australia
Try: Hickie; Murphy; Con: O'Gara; Pen: O'Gara (3)		Pen: Mortlock (2)

Lansdowne Road, Dublin
Attendance: 43,000
Referee: Marius Jonker (South Africa)

== Week 4 ==
25 November 2006
14:30 GMT

England	14–25	South Africa
Try: Cueto; Pen: Goode (3)		Try: Van der Linde; Con: Pretorius; Pen: Pretorius (2); Drop: Pretorius (4)

Twickenham Stadium, London
Attendance: 82,000
Referee: Alain Rolland (Ireland)

25 November 2006
14:30 GMT

Scotland	15–44	Australia
Try: Webster; Lamont; Con: Paterson; Pen: Paterson		Try: Larkham; Gerrard (2); Moore; Latham; Con: Mortlock (5); Pen: Mortlock (3)

Murrayfield Stadium, Edinburgh
Attendance: 64,120
Referee: Donal Courtney (Ireland)

25 November 2006
17:00 GMT

Wales	10–45	New Zealand
Try: M. Williams; Con: Hook; Pen: S. Jones		Try: McAlister; Sivivatu (3); Penalty try Con: Carter (2); N. Evans (2); Pen: Carter (4)

Millennium Stadium, Cardiff
Attendance: 75,000
Referee: Dave Pearson (England)

25 November 2006
15:00 CET

France	27–26	Argentina
Try: Dominici (2); Fritz; Con: Yachvili (3); Pen: Yachvili (2)		Try: Longo; Hernández; Con: Contepomi (2); Pen: Todeschini (2); Contepomi (2)

Stade de France, Saint-Denis
Referee: Alan Lewis (Ireland)

25 November 2006
14:30 CET

Italy	41–6	Canada
Try: Bortolami; Stanojevic (2); Zanni; Castrogiovanni; Con: Bortolussi (5); Pen: Bortolussi (2)		Pen: Monro (2)

Stadio Pordenone, Fontanafredda
Referee: Marius Jonker (South Africa)

26 November 2006
14:45 WET

Ireland	61–17	Pacific Islanders
Try: Hickie; P. Wallace; O'Kelly; Easterby (2); Horgan; Best; O'Connell; Con: P. Wallace (6); Pen: P. Wallace (3)	Report	Try: Rabeni; Fa'atau; T. Pisi; Con: T. Pisi

Lansdowne Road, Dublin
Referee: Christophe Berdos (France)

== See also ==
- End of year rugby union tests
