= 2007 Six Nations Championship =

Rugby union competition

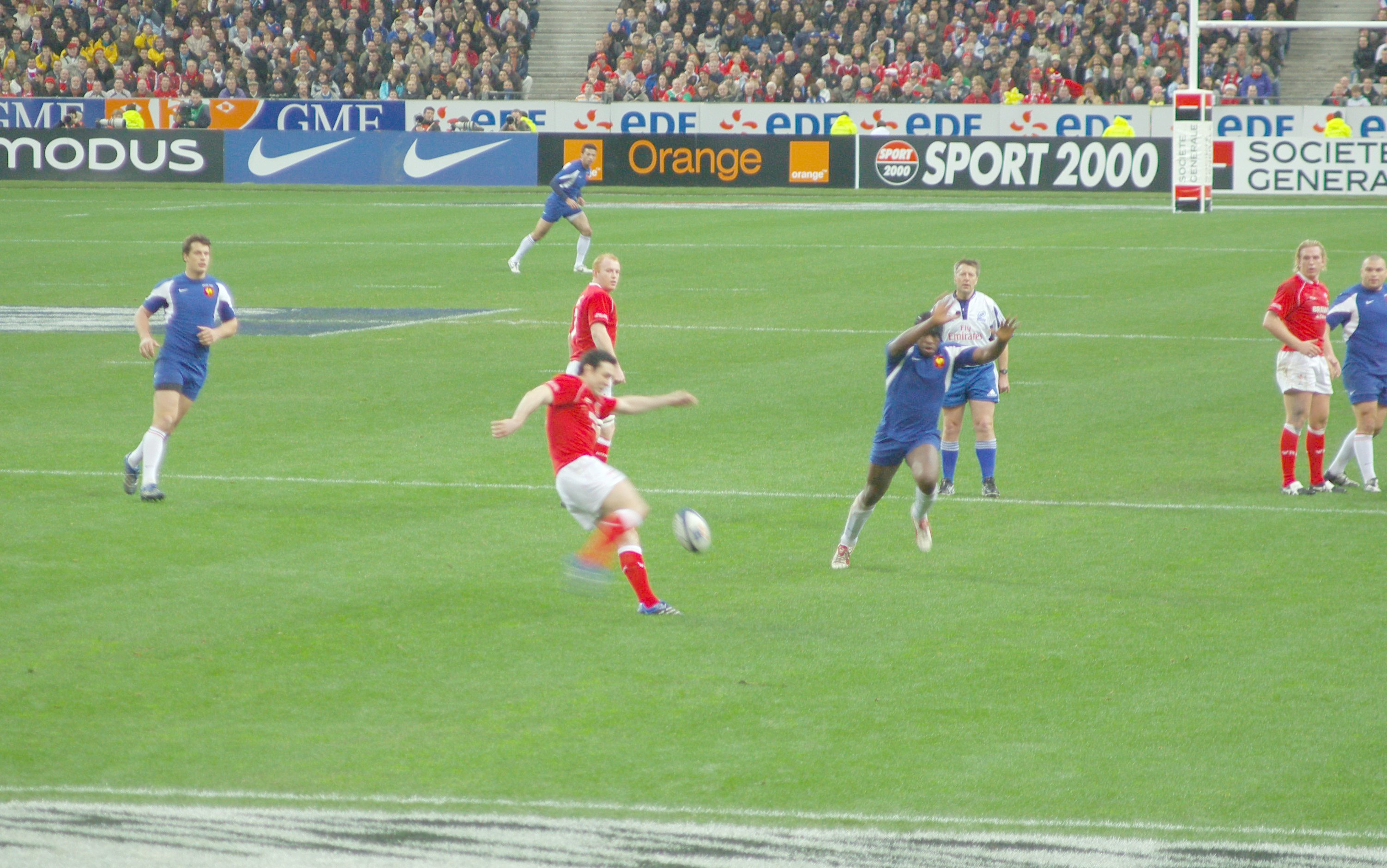
- France vs Wales, Stade de France, Saint-Denis, 24 February 2007
- Date: 3 February – 17 March 2007
- Countries: England; France; Ireland; Italy; Scotland; Wales

Tournament statistics
- Champions: France (16th title)
- Triple Crown: Ireland (9th title)
- Matches played: 15
- Tries scored: 65 (4.33 per match)
- Top point scorer: (Ireland) Ronan O'Gara (82)
- Top try scorers: (England) Jason Robinson (4) (Ireland) Ronan O'Gara (4)
- Player of the tournament: (Ireland) Brian O'Driscoll

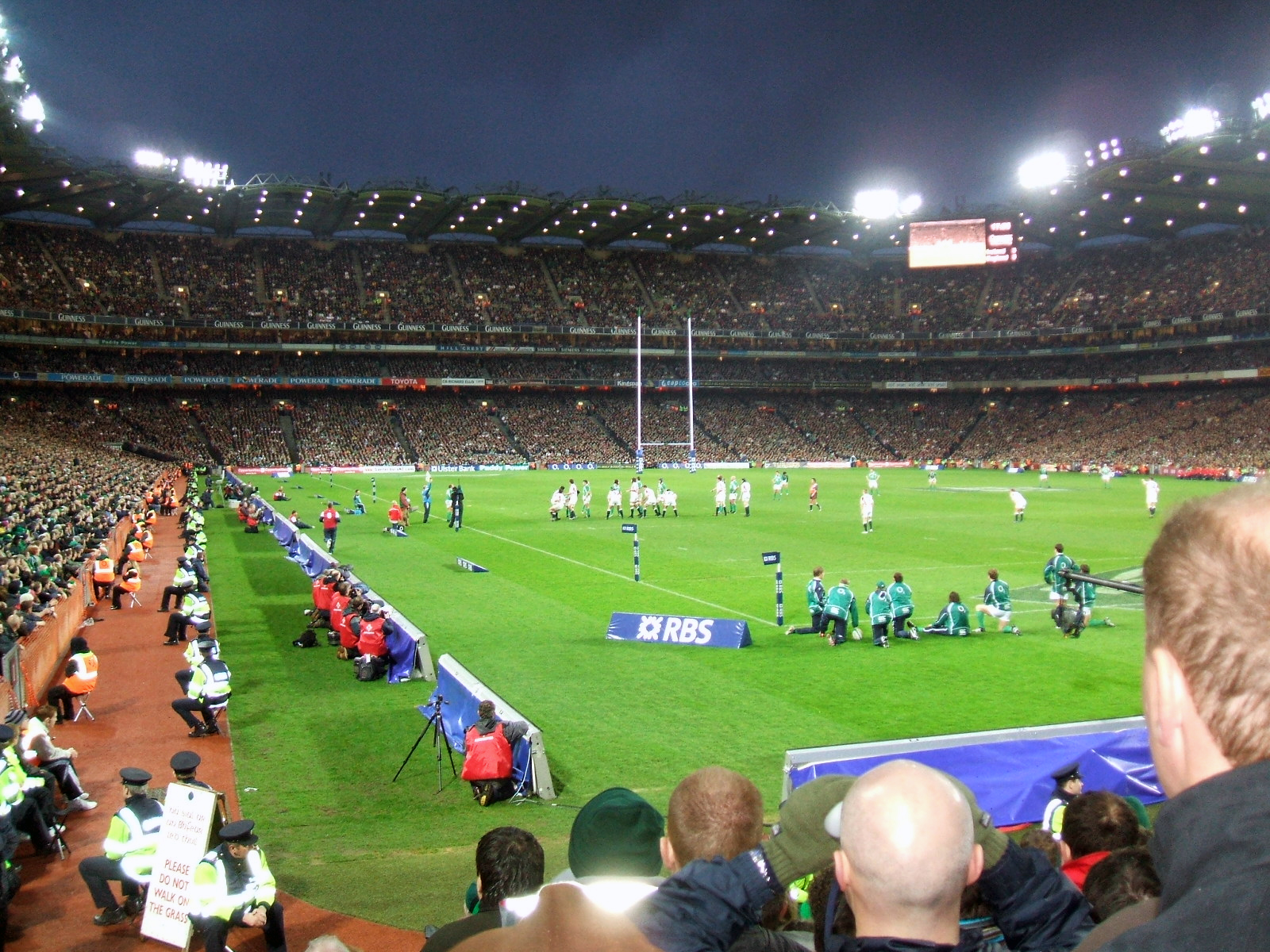
Rugby was played for the first time at Croke Park, seen here during the Ireland vs. England match.

The 2007 Six Nations Championship was the eighth series of the rugby union Six Nations Championship. Including the previous incarnations as the Home Nations and Five Nations, this was the 113th series of the international championship. Fifteen matches were played over five weekends from 3 February to 17 March.

In this year, France again won on points difference above Ireland, after four teams had at least a mathematical chance of topping the table going into the final week. Italy had their first away win of the tournament, beating Scotland in Edinburgh. It was also the first time that they won two of their matches, as they went on to beat Wales in Rome, finishing in 4th place, their best result so far. Scotland won the wooden spoon on points difference below Wales, and Ireland won the Triple Crown for the second straight year and third time in four years.

== Participants ==
Nation	Venue	City	Head coach	Captain
England	Twickenham Stadium	London	(England) Brian Ashton	Phil Vickery (Note: Mike Catt captained England in their final two matches against France and Wales, which Vickery missed due to injury.)
France	Stade de France	Saint-Denis	(France) Bernard Laporte	Raphaël Ibañez (Note: Regular captain Fabien Pelous was out injured for France's first two matches against Italy and Ireland, with vice-captain Ibañez elevated to the captaincy for both matches. Pelous' injury ultimately ruled him out of the entire 2007 competition, and Ibañez was announced as his replacement.)
Ireland	Croke Park (Note: Lansdowne Road, Ireland's traditional home, was demolished in 2007 to make way for the construction of the Aviva Stadium, which opened in 2010.)	Dublin	(Republic of Ireland) Eddie O'Sullivan	Brian O'Driscoll (Note: Paul O'Connell captained Ireland in their second match against France, which O'Driscoll missed due to injury.)
Italy	Stadio Flaminio	Rome	(France) Pierre Berbizier	Marco Bortolami
Scotland	Murrayfield Stadium	Edinburgh	(Scotland) Frank Hadden	Chris Paterson (Note: The regular Scotland captain, Jason White, did not play in this season's competition because he was recovering from a serious knee injury.)
Wales	Millennium Stadium	Cardiff	(Wales) Gareth Jenkins	Stephen Jones (Note: Jones was ruled out of Wales' final match against England due to a broken wrist. Gareth Thomas was named captain for the match, in which he equalled Gareth Llewellyn for most caps by a Wales player.)

== Table ==
Pos	Team	Pld	W	D	L	PF	PA	PD	T	Pts
1	France	5	4	0	1	155	86	+69	15	8
2	Ireland	5	4	0	1	149	84	+65	17	8
3	England	5	3	0	2	119	115	+4	10	6
4	Italy	5	2	0	3	94	147	−53	9	4
5	Wales	5	1	0	4	86	113	−27	7	2
6	Scotland	5	1	0	4	95	153	−58	7	2

Source: Six Nations Rugby
- After Round 4 of the competition, all of the teams had lost at least one match, and as a result, no one could win the Grand Slam.
- Ireland won the Triple Crown for the second straight year and third time in four years.

== The first four rounds ==
In the build-up to the competition, Ireland were being tipped as favourites for the Grand Slam, having played well during the Autumn Tests. However, despite having started strongly with a win against Wales, they lost to France 20–17 in a historic encounter at Croke Park. (Note: This was the first rugby match ever at Croke Park. Before 2005, the constitution of the Gaelic Athletic Association, which owns Croke Park, prohibited "foreign games" from being played on the ground. In practice, this ban was applied only to football and the rugby codes, as the stadium had been used for matches in International Rules football (a hybrid between Australian Rules and Gaelic football) and American football.) In turn, Ireland went on to beat England, who subsequently won against France.

Round 3 of the competition saw Italy win their first ever away match in the Six Nations. Scotland conceded three tries (all converted) in the first six minutes, and Italy went on to secure a historic 37–17 victory. In the same round, England's defeat by Ireland at Croke Park 43–13 marked their worst result ever in the history of the tournament, both in number of points conceded and in points difference (30 points).

In round 4, Italy achieved a second victory in the same tournament for the first time, when they defeated Wales 23–20 in Rome in a match that ended in controversy. Trailing by three points, Wales had the chance to equalise in the closing moments of the game when they were awarded a kickable penalty near the Italian 22-metre line. But, having been informed by the referee that 10 seconds remained, they chose to kick for touch, believing that there was time for an attacking line-out and possible try-scoring opportunity, only for the referee to blow his whistle and end the game before the line-out could form. The Welsh players were incensed and the referee later apologised for the misunderstanding that had arisen.

== Final day ==
All three matches in week five of the tournament were played on the same day and four teams — France, Ireland, England and Italy — still had a chance of winning the tournament: France were narrowly ahead of Ireland on points difference, England and Italy could become champions if they won by a large margin and the other results favoured them.

The game between Ireland and Italy was played first. At half-time, Ireland led by a single point, but they extended their lead in the second half. As time ran out, Ireland were in possession and could have kicked the ball into touch, ending the game and leaving France requiring a 30-point margin in their game; instead, they opted to seek another try, supposedly to set France a bigger target, only for Italy to regain possession and score a converted try, reducing France's target to 23 points.

The second game was between France and Scotland. After starting slowly, France steadily extended their lead, but were still three points short of their target when, with time running out, Elvis Vermeulen scored a try in injury-time, which was converted, to give France a 27-point victory and put them in the lead in the tournament. The referee referred the try to the Television Match Official (TMO), an Irishman, asking if there was any reason why the try should not be awarded. The TMO advised that there was no reason, and the referee awarded the try.

In the final match, England needed to beat Wales by 57 points to overtake France, while Wales were trying to avoid the wooden spoon. Wales led 15–0 after 15 minutes and 18–15 at half-time, and though England managed to draw level in the second half, James Hook then kicked two penalties and a drop goal, to give Wales the victory by 27–18. This result confirmed France's position as champions and handed the wooden spoon to Scotland, both on points difference.

== Results ==
=== Round 1 ===
3 February 2007
13:30 GMT

Italy	3–39	France
Pen: Pez (1/1) 36'	Report	Try: Dominici 23' c Heymans 30' c Chabal (2) 40' m, 44' c Jauzion 63' c Con: Skrela (4/5); Pen: Skrela (1/1) 13'; Beauxis (1/1) 72'

Stadio Flaminio, Rome
Attendance: 24,973
Referee: Wayne Barnes (England)

FB	15	Roland de Marigny
RW	14	Maurizio Zaffri
OC	13	Gonzalo Canale	(substituted off) 78'
IC	12	Mirco Bergamasco
LW	11	Andrea Masi
FH	10	Andrea Scanavacca	(substituted off) 25'
SH	9	Paul Griffen	(substituted off) 71'
N8	8	Sergio Parisse
OF	7	Mauro Bergamasco
BF	6	Alessandro Troncon
RL	5	Roberto Mandelli (c)
LL	4	Santiago Dellapè	(substituted off) 49'
TP	3	David Dal Maso	(substituted off) 49'
HK	2	Fabio Ongaro	(substituted off) 49'
LP	1	Salvatore Perugini	(substituted off) 49'
Substitutions:
HK	16	Carlo Festuccia	(substituted in) 49'
PR	17	Andrea Lo Cicero	(substituted in) 49'
PR	18	Martin Castrogiovanni	(substituted in) 49'
LK	19	Marco Bortolami	(substituted in) 49'
SH	20	Josh Sole	(substituted in) 71'
FH	21	Ramiro Pez	(substituted in) 25'
WG	22	Kaine Robertson	(substituted in) 78'
Coach:
(France) Pierre Berbizier

FB	15	Clément Poitrenaud
RW	14	Cédric Heymans
OC	13	Florian Fritz	(substituted off) 69'
IC	12	Yannick Jauzion
LW	11	Christophe Dominici
FH	10	David Skrela
SH	9	Pierre Mignoni
N8	8	Sébastien Chabal	(substituted off) 72'
OF	7	Julien Bonnaire	(substituted off) 66'
BF	6	Serge Betsen
RL	5	Jérôme Thion
LL	4	Lionel Nallet
TP	3	Pieter de Villiers
HK	2	Raphaël Ibañez (c)	(substituted off) 58'
LP	1	Olivier Milloud	(substituted off) 58'
Substitutions:
HK	16	Dimitri Szarzewski	(substituted in) 58'
PR	17	Sylvain Marconnet	(substituted in) 58'
LK	18	Pascal Papé	(substituted in) 72'
FL	19	Imanol Harinordoquy	(substituted in) 66'
SH	20	Dimitri Yachvili
FH	21	Lionel Beauxis	(substituted in) 69'
WG	22	Vincent Clerc
Coach:
Bernard Laporte

3 February 2007
16:00 GMT

England	42–20	Scotland
Try: Robinson (2) 37' m, 55' c Wilkinson 59' c Lund 72' m Con: Wilkinson (2/4); Pen: Wilkinson (5/5) 11', 29', 31', 49', 53'; Drop: Wilkinson (1/2) 19'	Report	Try: Taylor 25' c Dewey 77' c Con: Paterson (2/2); Pen: Paterson (2/3) 18', 43'

Twickenham Stadium, London
Attendance: 82,000
Referee: Marius Jonker (South Africa)

FB	15	Olly Morgan
RW	14	Josh Lewsey
OC	13	Mike Tindall
IC	12	Andy Farrell
LW	11	Jason Robinson
FH	10	Jonny Wilkinson
SH	9	Harry Ellis
N8	8	Martin Corry
OF	7	Magnus Lund
BF	6	Joe Worsley
RL	5	Danny Grewcock
LL	4	Louis Deacon
TP	3	Phil Vickery (c)	(substituted off) 74'
HK	2	George Chuter
LP	1	Perry Freshwater
Substitutions:
HK	16	Lee Mears
PR	17	Julian White	(substituted in) 74'
LK	18	Tom Palmer
FL	19	Tom Rees
SH	20	Peter Richards
FH	21	Toby Flood
CE	22	Mathew Tait
Coach:
Brian Ashton

FB	15	Hugo Southwell
RW	14	Sean Lamont
OC	13	Marcus Di Rollo
IC	12	Andrew Henderson	(substituted off) 62'
LW	11	Chris Paterson
FH	10	Dan Parks
SH	9	Chris Cusiter
N8	8	Dave Callam
OF	7	Kelly Brown	(substituted off) 62'
BF	6	Simon Taylor
RL	5	Jim Hamilton	(substituted off) 62'
LL	4	Alastair Kellock (c)
TP	3	Euan Murray
HK	2	Dougie Hall
LP	1	Gavin Kerr	(substituted off) 55'
Substitutions:
HK	16	Ross Ford
PR	17	Allan Jacobsen	(substituted in) 55'
LK	18	Scott Murray	(substituted in) 62'
FL	19	Ally Hogg	(substituted in) 62'
SH	20	Rory Lawson
CE	21	Rob Dewey	(substituted in) 62'
FB	22	Rory Lamont
Coach:
Frank Hadden

4 February 2007
15:00 GMT

Wales	9–19	Ireland
Pen: S. Jones (3/3) 9', 19', 25'	Report	Try: R. Best 1' m B. O'Driscoll 33' c O'Gara 71' c Con: O'Gara (2/3)

Millennium Stadium, Cardiff
Attendance: 74,239
Referee: Kelvin Deaker (New Zealand)

FB	15	Kevin Morgan
RW	14	Hal Luscombe	(substituted off) 60'
OC	13	Jamie Robinson
IC	12	James Hook
LW	11	Chris Czekaj
FH	10	Stephen Jones
SH	9	Dwayne Peel	(substituted off) 73'
N8	8	Ryan Jones (c)	34' to 40'
OF	7	Martyn Williams			(substituted off) 79'
BF	6	Alix Popham
RL	5	Alun Wyn Jones
LL	4	Ian Gough	(substituted off) 71'
TP	3	Chris Horsman	(substituted off) 55'
HK	2	T. Rhys Thomas	(substituted off) 67'
LP	1	Gethin Jenkins
Substitutions:
HK	16	Matthew Rees	(substituted in) 67'
PR	17	Duncan Jones	(substituted in) 55'
LK	18	Robert Sidoli	(substituted in) 71'
FH	19	Gavin Thomas	(substituted in) 34'	(substituted off) 40'	(substituted in) 79'
SH	20	Mike Phillips	(substituted in) 73'
CE	21	Ceri Sweeney
WG	22	Aled Brew	(substituted in) 60'
Coach:
(Wales) Gareth Jenkins

FB	15	Girvan Dempsey
RW	14	Andrew Trimble
OC	13	Brian O'Driscoll (c)			(substituted off) 75'
IC	12	Gordon D'Arcy
LW	11	Denis Hickie	(substituted off) 27'	(substituted in) 37'
FH	10	Ronan O'Gara
SH	9	Peter Stringer
N8	8	Denis Leamy
OF	7	David Wallace
BF	6	Simon Easterby
RL	5	Paul O'Connell
LL	4	Donncha O'Callaghan
TP	3	John Hayes
HK	2	Rory Best	(substituted off) 65'
LP	1	Marcus Horan
Substitutions:
HK	16	Jerry Flannery	(substituted in) 65'
PR	17	Simon Best
LK	18	Mick O'Driscoll
FL	19	Neil Best
SH	20	Isaac Boss
FH	21	Paddy Wallace
FB	22	Geordan Murphy	(substituted in) 27'	(substituted off) 37'	(substituted in) 75'
Coach:
Eddie O'Sullivan

=== Round 2 ===
10 February 2007
13:30 GMT

England	20–7	Italy
Try: Robinson 39' m Pen: Wilkinson (5/5) 3', 15', 25', 56', 75'	Report	Try: Scanavacca 65' c Con: Scanavacca (1/1)

Twickenham Stadium, London
Attendance: 82,000
Referee: Nigel Owens (Wales)

FB	15	Iain Balshaw
RW	14	Josh Lewsey
OC	13	Mike Tindall
IC	12	Andy Farrell
LW	11	Jason Robinson
FH	10	Jonny Wilkinson
SH	9	Harry Ellis
N8	8	Martin Corry
OF	7	Magnus Lund
BF	6	Nick Easter
RL	5	Danny Grewcock
LL	4	Louis Deacon
TP	3	Phil Vickery (c)
HK	2	George Chuter	(substituted off) 70'
LP	1	Perry Freshwater
Substitutions:
HK	16	Lee Mears
PR	17	Julian White	(substituted in) 70'
LK	18	Tom Palmer
FL	19	Tom Rees
SH	20	Shaun Perry
FH	21	Toby Flood
CE	22	Mathew Tait
Coach:
Brian Ashton

FB	15	Roland de Marigny
RW	14	Kaine Robertson
OC	13	Gonzalo Canale
IC	12	Mirco Bergamasco
LW	11	Enrico Patrizio	(substituted off) 24'
FH	10	Andrea Scanavacca
SH	9	Alessandro Troncon
N8	8	Sergio Parisse
OF	7	Warren Spragg
BF	6	Roberto Mandelli
RL	5	Marco Bortolami (c)
LL	4	Santiago Dellapè	(substituted off) 71'
TP	3	Martin Castrogiovanni
HK	2	Walter Pozzebon
LP	1	Andrea Lo Cicero	(substituted off) 58'
Substitutions:
HK	16	Fabio Ongaro
PR	17	Salvatore Perugini	(substituted in) 58'
LK	18	Valerio Bernabò	(substituted in) 71'
FL	19	Josh Sole
SH	20	Paul Griffen
CE	21	Ramiro Pez
WG	22	Matteo Pratichetti (substituted in) 24'
Coach:
(France) Pierre Berbizier

10 February 2007
15:30 GMT

Scotland	21–9	Wales
Pen: Paterson (7/7) 6', 19', 37', 48', 52', 58', 79'	Report	Pen: S. Jones (3/3) 24', 40', 54'

Murrayfield Stadium, Edinburgh
Attendance: 67,500
Referee: Alan Lewis (Ireland)

FB	15	Hugo Southwell
RW	14	Sean Lamont
OC	13	Marcus Di Rollo
IC	12	Rob Dewey
LW	11	Chris Paterson
FH	10	Phil Godman	(substituted off) 70'
SH	9	Chris Cusiter
N8	8	Dave Callam
OF	7	Kelly Brown	(substituted off) 56'
BF	6	Simon Taylor (c)
RL	5	Scott Murray
LL	4	Jim Hamilton	(substituted off) 49'
TP	3	Euan Murray
HK	2	Ross Ford
LP	1	Gavin Kerr	(substituted off) 56'
Substitutions:
PR	16	Allan Jacobsen	(substituted in) 56'
LK	17	Nathan Hines	(substituted in) 49'
FL	18	Ally Hogg	(substituted in) 56'
SH	19	Rory Lawson
CE	20	Graeme Morrison
CE	21	Simon Webster
WG	22	Nikki Walker	(substituted in) 70'
Coach:
Frank Hadden

FB	15	Kevin Morgan
RW	14	Mark Jones
OC	13	Jamie Robinson
IC	12	James Hook
LW	11	Chris Czekaj
FH	10	Stephen Jones
SH	9	Dwayne Peel
N8	8	Ryan Jones (c)
OF	7	Martyn Williams
BF	6	Alix Popham
RL	5	Alun Wyn Jones
LL	4	Robert Sidoli	(substituted off) 53'
TP	3	Duncan Jones
HK	2	T. Rhys Thomas
LP	1	Adam Jones
Substitutions:
HK	16	Matthew Rees
PR	17	Gethin Jenkins
LK	18	Ian Gough	(substituted in) 53'
FH	19	Jonathan Thomas
SH	20	Mike Phillips
FH	21	Ceri Sweeney
CE	22	Tom Shanklin
Coach:
Gareth Jenkins

11 February 2007
15:00 GMT

Ireland	17–20	France
Try: O'Gara 31' m Pen: O'Gara (4/4) 12', 24', 56', 78'	Report	Try: Ibañez 14' c Clerc 79' c Con: Skrela (1/1); Beauxis (1/1); Pen: Skrela (2/4) 4', 9'

Croke Park, Dublin
Attendance: 81,000
Referee: Steve Walsh (New Zealand)

FB	15	Girvan Dempsey
RW	14	Geordan Murphy
OC	13	Gordon D'Arcy
IC	12	Shane Horgan
LW	11	Denis Hickie
FH	10	Ronan O'Gara
SH	9	Isaac Boss
N8	8	Denis Leamy
OF	7	David Wallace
BF	6	Simon Easterby
RL	5	Paul O'Connell
LL	4	Donncha O'Callaghan
TP	3	John Hayes
HK	2	Rory Best
LP	1	Marcus Horan
Substitutions:
HK	16	Jerry Flannery
PR	17	Simon Best
LK	18	Mick O'Driscoll
FL	19	Neil Best
SH	20	Eoin Reddan
FH	21	Paddy Wallace
WG	22	Andrew Trimble
Coach:
Eddie O'Sullivan

FB	15	Clément Poitrenaud
RW	14	Vincent Clerc
OC	13	David Marty
IC	12	Yannick Jauzion
LW	11	Christophe Dominici
FH	10	David Skrela
SH	9	Pierre Mignoni
N8	8	Sébastien Chabal
OF	7	Imanol Harinordoquy
BF	6	Serge Betsen
RL	5	Pascal Papé
LL	4	Lionel Nallet
TP	3	Pieter de Villiers
HK	2	Raphaël Ibañez
LP	1	Sylvain Marconnet
Substitutions:
HK	16	Yannick Bru
PR	17	Olivier Milloud
LK	18	Jérôme Thion
FL	19	Julien Bonnaire
SH	20	Dimitri Yachvili
FH	21	Lionel Beauxis
FB	22	Cédric Heymans
Coach:
Bernard Laporte

=== Round 3 ===
24 February 2007
15:00 GMT

Scotland	17–37	Italy
Try: Dewey 14' c Paterson 60' c Con: Paterson (2/2); Pen: Paterson (1/1) 40'	Report	Try: Ma. Bergamasco 1' c Scanavacca 4' c Robertson 6' c Troncon 75' c Con: Scanavacca (4/4); Pen: Scanavacca (3/3) 19', 66', 71'

Murrayfield Stadium, Edinburgh
Attendance: 50,284
Referee: Donal Courtney (Ireland)

FB	15	Hugo Southwell
RW	14	Sean Lamont
OC	13	Marcus Di Rollo
IC	12	Rob Dewey
LW	11	Chris Paterson
FH	10	Phil Godman
SH	9	Chris Cusiter
N8	8	Dave Callam
OF	7	Kelly Brown
BF	6	Simon Taylor
RL	5	Scott Murray
LL	4	Nathan Hines
TP	3	Euan Murray
HK	2	Dougie Hall
LP	1	Gavin Kerr
Substitutions:
HK	16	Ross Ford
PR	17	Allan Jacobsen
LK	18	Jim Hamilton
FL	19	Ally Hogg
SH	20	Rory Lawson
CE	21	Andrew Henderson
WG	22	Nikki Walker
Coach:
Frank Hadden

FB	15	Roland de Marigny
RW	14	Kaine Robertson
OC	13	Gonzalo Canale
IC	12	Mirco Bergamasco
LW	11	Andrea Masi
FH	10	Andrea Scanavacca
SH	9	Alessandro Troncon
N8	8	Sergio Parisse
OF	7	Mauro Bergamasco
BF	6	Alessandro Zanni
RL	5	Marco Bortolami
LL	4	Santiago Dellapè
TP	3	Martín Castrogiovanni
HK	2	Carlo Festuccia
LP	1	Andrea Lo Cicero
Substitutions:
HK	16	Fabio Ongaro
PR	17	Salvatore Perugini
PR	18	Enrico Patrizio
LK	19	Valerio Bernabò
FL	20	Maurizio Zaffiri
SH	21	Paul Griffen
FH	22	Ramiro Pez
Coach:
Pierre Berbizier

- This was Italy's biggest margin of victory over a Tier 1 nation.

24 February 2007
17:30 GMT

Ireland	43–13	England
Try: Dempsey 30' c D. Wallace 37' c Horgan 63' c Boss 78' c Con: O'Gara (3/3); P. Wallace (1/1); Pen: O'Gara (5/5) 6', 20', 26', 43', 57'	Report	Try: Strettle 46' c Con: Wilkinson (1/1); Pen: Wilkinson (2/3) 2', 56'

Croke Park, Dublin
Attendance: 81,611
Referee: Joël Jutge (France)

FB	15	Girvan Dempsey
RW	14	Shane Horgan
OC	13	Brian O'Driscoll (c)
IC	12	Gordon D'Arcy
LW	11	Denis Hickie
FH	10	Ronan O'Gara
SH	9	Peter Stringer
N8	8	Denis Leamy
OF	7	David Wallace
BF	6	Simon Easterby
RL	5	Paul O'Connell
LL	4	Donncha O'Callaghan
TP	3	John Hayes
HK	2	Rory Best
LP	1	Marcus Horan
Substitutions:
HK	16	Jerry Flannery
PR	17	Simon Best
LK	18	Mick O'Driscoll
FL	19	Neil Best
SH	20	Isaac Boss
FH	21	Paddy Wallace
WG	22	Andrew Trimble
Coach:
Eddie O'Sullivan

FB	15	Olly Morgan
RW	14	Josh Lewsey
OC	13	Mike Tindall
IC	12	Andy Farrell
LW	11	David Strettle
FH	10	Jonny Wilkinson
SH	9	Harry Ellis
N8	8	Martin Corry
OF	7	Magnus Lund
BF	6	Joe Worsley
RL	5	Danny Grewcock
LL	4	Louis Deacon
TP	3	Phil Vickery (c)
HK	2	George Chuter
LP	1	Perry Freshwater
Substitutions:
HK	16	Lee Mears
PR	17	Julian White
LK	18	Tom Palmer
FL	19	Tom Rees
SH	20	Shaun Perry
FH	21	Toby Flood
CE	22	Mathew Tait
Coach:
Brian Ashton

24 February 2007
20:00 GMT

France	32–21	Wales
Try: Dominici 28' c Nallet 34' c Con: Skrela (2/2); Pen: Skrela (5/6) 11', 18', 38', 46', 52'; Beauxis (1/1) 80'	Report	Try: Popham 13' c Shanklin 15' c Robinson 74' c Con: S. Jones (3/3)

Stade de France, Saint-Denis
Attendance: 79,959
Referee: Tony Spreadbury (England)

FB	15	Clément Poitrenaud
RW	14	Vincent Clerc
OC	13	David Marty
IC	12	Yannick Jauzion
LW	11	Christophe Dominici
FH	10	David Skrela
SH	9	Pierre Mignoni
N8	8	Elvis Vermeulen
OF	7	Julien Bonnaire
BF	6	Serge Betsen
RL	5	Jérôme Thion
LL	4	Lionel Nallet
TP	3	Nicolas Mas
HK	2	Raphaël Ibañez
LP	1	Olivier Milloud
Substitutions:
HK	16	Benoît August
PR	17	Sylvain Marconnet
LK	18	Grégory Lamboley
N8	19	Imanol Harinordoquy
SH	20	Dimitri Yachvili
FH	21	Lionel Beauxis
WG	22	Aurélien Rougerie
Coach:
Bernard Laporte

FB	15	Lee Byrne
RW	14	Mark Jones
OC	13	Tom Shanklin
IC	12	James Hook
LW	11	Shane Williams
FH	10	Stephen Jones
SH	9	Dwayne Peel
N8	8	Ryan Jones
OF	7	Martyn Williams
BF	6	Alix Popham
RL	5	Alun Wyn Jones
LL	4	Ian Gough
TP	3	Chris Horsman
HK	2	Matthew Rees
LP	1	Gethin Jenkins
Substitutions:
HK	16	T. Rhys Thomas
PR	17	Duncan Jones
LK	18	Brent Cockbain
FL	19	Jonathan Thomas
SH	20	Mike Phillips
FH	21	Ceri Sweeney
CE	22	Jamie Robinson
Coach:
Gareth Jenkins

=== Round 4 ===
10 March 2007
13:30 GMT

Scotland	18–19	Ireland
Pen: Paterson (6/6) 17', 36', 40', 51', 61', 66'	Report	Try: O'Gara 30' c Con: O'Gara (1/1); Pen: O'Gara (4/6) 9', 38', 68', 70'

Murrayfield Stadium, Edinburgh
Attendance: 67,800
Referee: Dave Pearson (England)

FB	15	Hugo Southwell
RW	14	Sean Lamont
OC	13	Marcus Di Rollo
IC	12	Rob Dewey
LW	11	Chris Paterson
FH	10	Dan Parks
SH	9	Chris Cusiter
N8	8	Dave Callam
OF	7	Kelly Brown
BF	6	Simon Taylor
RL	5	Scott Murray
LL	4	Nathan Hines
TP	3	Euan Murray
HK	2	Dougie Hall
LP	1	Gavin Kerr
Substitutions:
HK	16	Ross Ford
PR	17	Allan Jacobsen
LK	18	Jim Hamilton
FL	19	Ally Hogg
SH	20	Rory Lawson
CE	21	Andrew Henderson
WG	22	Rory Lamont
Coach:
Frank Hadden

FB	15	Girvan Dempsey
RW	14	Shane Horgan
OC	13	Brian O'Driscoll
IC	12	Gordon D'Arcy
LW	11	Denis Hickie
FH	10	Ronan O'Gara
SH	9	Peter Stringer
N8	8	Denis Leamy
OF	7	David Wallace
BF	6	Simon Easterby
RL	5	Paul O'Connell
LL	4	Donncha O'Callaghan
TP	3	John Hayes
HK	2	Rory Best
LP	1	Simon Best
Substitutions:
HK	16	Jerry Flannery
PR	17	Bryan Young
LK	18	Mick O'Driscoll
FL	19	Neil Best
SH	20	Eoin Reddan
FH	21	Paddy Wallace
WG	22	Andrew Trimble
Coach:
Eddie O'Sullivan

- Ireland won the Triple Crown.

10 March 2007
15:30 GMT

Italy	23–20	Wales
Try: Robertson 37' c Mauro Bergamasco 78' c Con: Pez (2/2); Pen: Pez (3/4) 12', 20', 73'	Report	Try: S. Williams 27' c Rees 45' c Con: S. Jones (1/1); Hook (1/1); Pen: Hook (2/2) 44', 54'

Stadio Flaminio, Rome
Attendance: 24,973
Referee: Chris White (England)

FB	15	Roland de Marigny
RW	14	Kaine Robertson
OC	13	Gonzalo Canale
IC	12	Mirco Bergamasco
LW	11	Andrea Pratichetti
FH	10	Ramiro Pez
SH	9	Alessandro Troncon
N8	8	Sergio Parisse
OF	7	Mauro Bergamasco
BF	6	Alessandro Zanni
RL	5	Marco Bortolami
LL	4	Santiago Dellapè
TP	3	Alessio Galante
HK	2	Carlo Festuccia
LP	1	Andrea Lo Cicero
Substitutions:
HK	16	Leonardo Ghiraldini
PR	17	Salvatore Perugini
PR	18	Fabio Staibano
LK	19	Valerio Bernabò
FL	20	Maurizio Zaffiri
SH	21	Paul Griffen
FH	22	Andrea Scanavacca
Coach:
Pierre Berbizier

FB	15	Kevin Morgan
RW	14	Mark Jones
OC	13	Tom Shanklin
IC	12	James Hook
LW	11	Shane Williams
FH	10	Stephen Jones
SH	9	Dwayne Peel
N8	8	Ryan Jones
OF	7	Martyn Williams
BF	6	Alix Popham
RL	5	Alun Wyn Jones
LL	4	Ian Gough
TP	3	Chris Horsman
HK	2	Matthew Rees
LP	1	Gethin Jenkins
Substitutions:
HK	16	T. Rhys Thomas
PR	17	Duncan Jones
PR	18	Adam Jones
LK	19	Brent Cockbain
FL	20	Jonathan Thomas
SH	21	Mike Phillips
FB	22	Gareth Thomas
Coach:
Gareth Jenkins

- This was the first time that Italy won two matches in a Six Nations Championship.

11 March 2007
15:00 GMT

England	26–18	France
Try: Flood 48' c Tindall 73' c Con: Flood (1/1); Geraghty (1/1); Pen: Flood (3/5) 8', 31', 35'; Geraghty (1/1) 68'	Report	Pen: Skrela (3/3) 4', 15', 21'; Yachvili (3/3) 34', 52', 59'

Twickenham Stadium, London
Attendance: 82,000
Referee: Jonathan Kaplan (South Africa)

FB	15	Josh Lewsey
RW	14	David Strettle
OC	13	Mike Tindall
IC	12	Mike Catt (c)
LW	11	Jason Robinson
FH	10	Toby Flood
SH	9	Harry Ellis
N8	8	Nick Easter
OF	7	Tom Rees
BF	6	Joe Worsley
RL	5	Tom Palmer
LL	4	Martin Corry
TP	3	Julian White
HK	2	George Chuter
LP	1	Tim Payne
Substitutions:
HK	16	Lee Mears
PR	17	Stuart Turner
LK	18	Louis Deacon
FL	19	Magnus Lund
SH	20	Shaun Perry
FH	21	Shane Geraghty
CE	22	Mathew Tait
Coach:
Brian Ashton

FB	15	Clément Poitrenaud
RW	14	Vincent Clerc
OC	13	David Marty
IC	12	Yannick Jauzion
LW	11	Christophe Dominici
FH	10	David Skrela
SH	9	Dimitri Yachvili
N8	8	Sébastien Chabal
OF	7	Julien Bonnaire
BF	6	Serge Betsen
RL	5	Jérôme Thion
LL	4	Lionel Nallet
TP	3	Pieter de Villiers
HK	2	Raphaël Ibañez (c)
LP	1	Olivier Milloud
Substitutions:
HK	16	Sébastien Bruno
PR	17	Nicolas Mas
LK	18	Pascal Papé
N8	19	Imanol Harinordoquy
SH	20	Pierre Mignoni
FH	21	Lionel Beauxis
FB	22	Cédric Heymans
Coach:
Bernard Laporte

- England's victory meant that no team could now win the Grand Slam.

=== Round 5 ===
17 March 2007
13:30 GMT

Italy	24–51	Ireland
Try: Bortolami 75' m De Marigny 80' c Con: Scanavacca (1/2); Pen: Pez (2/3) 15', 26'; Drop: Pez (2/2) 12', 29'	Report	Try: Dempsey (2) 17' m, 46' c Easterby 21' m D'Arcy 40' c Horgan 51' m Hickie (2) 55' c, 77' m O'Gara 59' c Con: O'Gara (4/8); Pen: O'Gara (1/1) 6'

Stadio Flaminio, Rome
Attendance: 24,973
Referee: Jonathan Kaplan (South Africa)

FB	15	Roland de Marigny
RW	14	Kaine Robertson
OC	13	Ezio Galon
IC	12	Mirco Bergamasco
LW	11	Andrea Pratichetti
FH	10	Ramiro Pez
SH	9	Alessandro Troncon
N8	8	Sergio Parisse
OF	7	Maurizio Zaffiri
BF	6	Alessandro Zanni
RL	5	Marco Bortolami
LL	4	Santiago Dellapè
TP	3	Walter Pozzebon
HK	2	Carlo Festuccia
LP	1	Salvatore Perugini
Substitutions:
HK	16	Leonardo Ghiraldini
PR	17	Fabio Staibano
LK	18	Valerio Bernabò
FL	19	Josh Sole
SH	20	Paul Griffen
FH	21	Warren Spragg
CE	22	Matteo Barbini
Coach:
Pierre Berbizier

FB	15	Girvan Dempsey
RW	14	Shane Horgan
OC	13	Brian O'Driscoll (c)
IC	12	Gordon D'Arcy
LW	11	Denis Hickie
FH	10	Ronan O'Gara
SH	9	Peter Stringer
N8	8	Denis Leamy
OF	7	David Wallace
BF	6	Simon Easterby
RL	5	Mick O'Driscoll
LL	4	Donncha O'Callaghan
TP	3	John Hayes
HK	2	Rory Best
LP	1	Marcus Horan
Substitutions:
HK	16	Jerry Flannery
PR	17	Simon Best
LK	18	Trevor Hogan
FL	19	Neil Best
SH	20	Eoin Reddan
FH	21	Paddy Wallace
WG	22	Andrew Trimble
Coach:
Eddie O'Sullivan

17 March 2007
15:30 GMT

France	46–19	Scotland
Try: Harinordoquy 29' c Jauzion 33' c Marty 52' c Heymans 59' m Milloud 62' c Vermeulen 80' c Con: Beauxis (5/6); Pen: Beauxis (2/2) 19', 37'	Report	Try: Walker 7' c S. Lamont 40' c E. Murray 76' m Con: Paterson (2/3)

Stade de France, Saint-Denis
Attendance: 79,959
Referee: Craig Joubert (South Africa)

FB	15	Clément Poitrenaud
RW	14	Vincent Clerc
OC	13	David Marty
IC	12	Yannick Jauzion
LW	11	Cédric Heymans
FH	10	Lionel Beauxis
SH	9	Pierre Mignoni
N8	8	Imanol Harinordoquy
OF	7	Julien Bonnaire
BF	6	Serge Betsen
RL	5	Jérôme Thion
LL	4	Lionel Nallet
TP	3	Pieter de Villiers
HK	2	Raphaël Ibañez (c)
LP	1	Olivier Milloud
Substitutions:
PR	16	Nicolas Mas
HK	17	Sébastien Bruno
LK	18	Pascal Papé
N8	19	Elvis Vermeulen
SH	20	Jean-Baptiste Élissalde
CE	21	Damien Traille
WG	22	Christophe Dominici
Coach:
Bernard Laporte

FB	15	Chris Paterson
RW	14	Sean Lamont
OC	13	Rob Dewey
IC	12	Andrew Henderson
LW	11	Nikki Walker
FH	10	Dan Parks
SH	9	Rory Lawson
N8	8	Ally Hogg
OF	7	Kelly Brown
BF	6	Simon Taylor
RL	5	Scott Murray
LL	4	Nathan Hines
TP	3	Euan Murray
HK	2	Ross Ford
LP	1	Gavin Kerr
Substitutions:
HK	16	Dougie Hall
PR	17	Allan Jacobsen
LK	18	Jim Hamilton
N8	19	Dave Callam
SH	20	Chris Cusiter
CE	21	Marcus Di Rollo
WG	22	Rory Lamont
Coach:
Frank Hadden

- France needed to win by 24 points to overtake Ireland.

17 March 2007
17:30 GMT

Wales	27–18	England
Try: Hook 3' c Horsman 13' m Con: Hook (1/2); Pen: Hook (4/5) 11', 39', 64', 74'; Drop: Hook (1/2) 68'	Report	Try: Ellis 32' c Robinson 40' m Con: Flood (1/2); Pen: Flood (1/1) 46'; Drop: Flood (1/1) 35'

Millennium Stadium, Cardiff
Attendance: 74,500
Referee: Alain Rolland (Ireland)

FB	15	Kevin Morgan
RW	14	Mark Jones
OC	13	Tom Shanklin
IC	12	Gareth Thomas (c)
LW	11	Shane Williams
FH	10	James Hook
SH	9	Dwayne Peel
N8	8	Ryan Jones
OF	7	Martyn Williams
BF	6	Alix Popham
RL	5	Alun Wyn Jones
LL	4	Ian Gough
TP	3	Chris Horsman
HK	2	Matthew Rees
LP	1	Gethin Jenkins
Substitutions:
HK	16	T. Rhys Thomas
PR	17	Duncan Jones
PR	18	Adam Jones
LK	19	Brent Cockbain
FL	20	Jonathan Thomas
SH	21	Mike Phillips
CE	22	Jamie Robinson
Coach:
Gareth Jenkins

FB	15	Mark Cueto
RW	14	David Strettle
OC	13	Mathew Tait
IC	12	Mike Catt (c)
LW	11	Jason Robinson
FH	10	Toby Flood
SH	9	Harry Ellis
N8	8	Joe Worsley
OF	7	Tom Rees
BF	6	James Haskell
RL	5	Tom Palmer
LL	4	Martin Corry
TP	3	Julian White
HK	2	George Chuter
LP	1	Tim Payne
Substitutions:
HK	16	Lee Mears
PR	17	Stuart Turner
LK	18	Louis Deacon
FL	19	Magnus Lund
SH	20	Shaun Perry
FH	21	Shane Geraghty
CE	22	Jamie Noon
Coach:
Brian Ashton

- England needed to win by 57 points to win the Championship.

== Scorers ==
Leading try scorers
Pos	Name	Tries	Pld	Team
1	Ronan O'Gara	4	5	Ireland
1	Jason Robinson	4	4	England
3	Girvan Dempsey	3	3	Ireland
4	Mauro Bergamasco	2	3	Italy
4	Sébastien Chabal	2	3	France
4	Rob Dewey	2	5	Scotland
4	Christophe Dominici	2	5	France
4	Cédric Heymans	2	4	France
4	Denis Hickie	2	5	Ireland
4	Shane Horgan	2	4	Ireland
4	Yannick Jauzion	2	5	France
4	Kaine Robertson	2	5	Italy
4	Andrea Scanavacca	2	4	Italy

Leading point scorers
Pos	Name	Points	Pld	Team
1	Ronan O'Gara	82	5	Ireland
2	Chris Paterson	65	5	Scotland
3	Jonny Wilkinson	50	3	England
