= Erik Lund (rugby union) =

Norway rugby union player (born 1979)

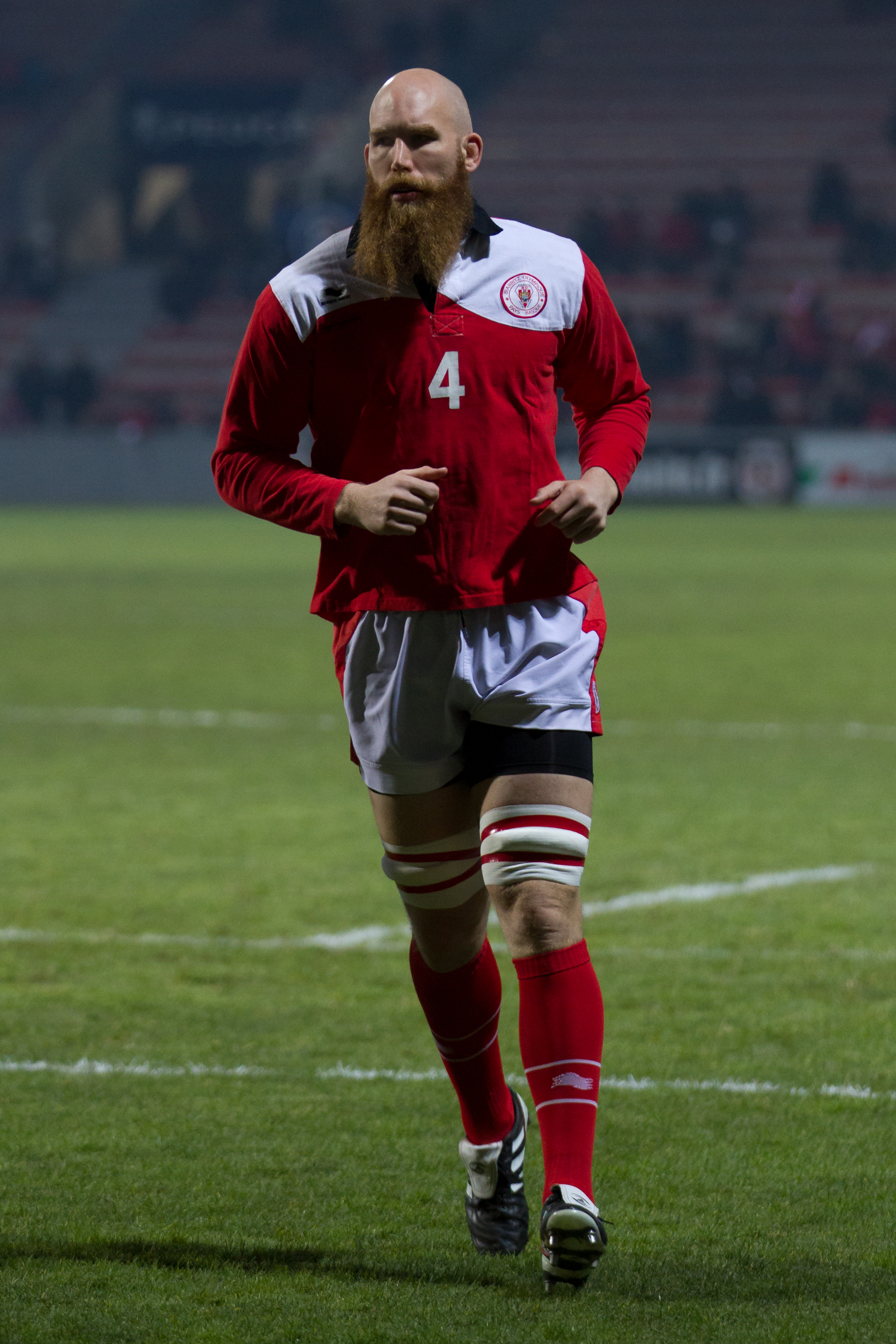
- Born: 3 July 1979 (age 47) Fredrikstad, Norway
- Height: 6 ft 8 in (2.03 m)
- Weight: 264 lb (120 kg)
- Notable relative: Magnus Lund (brother)

Rugby union career
- Position: Lock
Senior career
| Years | Team | Apps | (Points) |
| 2007–2010 | Leeds Carnegie | 74 | (25) |
| 2010–2016 | Biarritz | 137 | (10) |
International career
| Years | Team | Apps | (Points) |
| 1998–2016 | Norway | 89 | (15) |

Erik Lund (born 3 July 1979) is a former Norwegian rugby union footballer who played lock forward for Norway and since 2010 for the French team Biarritz, where he joined his younger brother Magnus. He formerly captained Leeds Carnegie.

The son of Norwegian basketball international Morten Lund, his family moved to England when he was six months old. He was educated at St Thomas's School and the Lancaster Royal Grammar School.

Lund played for the Jesmond Jaguars and a few games for Medicals RFC while he was at the University of Newcastle. He became a computer programmer after graduating and started playing rugby socially with Winnington Park in Cheshire, but he started taking steps up the rugby ladder, moving on to Manchester Rugby Club, Fylde Rugby Club, Sedgley Park R.U.F.C. and Rotherham R.U.F.C. He also became an international rugby player, returning to play for Norway when his work commitments would allow.

Lund's breakthrough came at Rotherham in National Division One, where he refined his technique and became highly motivated under the training of head coach Andre Bester. Following this form he was signed by Leeds ahead of their Premiership Campaign.

Lund was picked for the Barbarians squad against Wales in June 2011.
