= Shaun Perry =

England international rugby union player

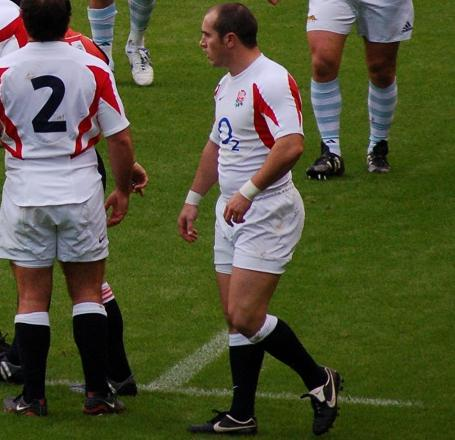
- Shaun Perry against Argentina in 2006
- Born: Shaun Andrew Perry; 4 May 1978 (age 48) Wolverhampton
- Height: 1.80 m (5 ft 11 in)
- Weight: 98 kg (15 st 6 lb)

Rugby union career
- Position: Scrum-half
Amateur team(s)
Years	Team	Apps	(Points)
1985–2003	Dudley Kingswinford RFC		
2003–2005	Coventry RFC		
Senior career
Years	Team	Apps	(Points)
2000–2003	Dudley Kingswinford	72	(276)
2003–2005	Coventry	39	(40)
2005–2009	Bristol	57	(50)
2009–2011	CA Brive	51	(20)
2011–2013	Worcester Warriors	29	(5)
- Correct as of 23 July 2013
International career
Years	Team	Apps	(Points)
2006–2007	England Saxons		
2006–2007	England	14	(10)
- Correct as of 23 July 2013

Shaun Perry (born 4 May 1978) is a former English rugby union footballer, who last played for Worcester Warriors in the Aviva Premiership. His usual position was at scrum half.

Perry began playing rugby in the Youth Section of Dudley Kingswinford RFC at age 7. He rose through the age groups to eventually make his senior debut in the DKRFC Colts team. The next year at age 18 he was playing for the 1st XV, where he played for seven seasons before joining Coventry.

== Biography ==
Born 4 May 1978 in Wolverhampton, Perry started his career at Dudley Kingswinford in tier 4 of the English club game. He scored over 270 points for the Midlands team including 52 tries with the highlight of his stay being the 2001-02 season where he was the league's top scorer with 25 tries, helping Dudley Kingswinford to a runners up spot and almost gaining promotion (they lost the playoff match). Perry's point scoring exploits saw him be picked up by another Midlands team, Coventry, whom he played for in National Division One for two seasons, during which time he scored a try in a match against his future club, Bristol. After eleven games for Bristol during the 2005–06 season, Perry was called up into the England A squad. He was given the captaincy for the match against Ireland A.

Towards the end of the 2005–06 season, Perry sustained a wrist injury which ruled him out for approximately eight weeks of play, and therefore also put him out of contention to represent England during the summer tests to Australia, for a two-test Cook Cup series. In August 2006, Perry was included in the 2006–07 England Elite Player Squad.

In October 2006, Perry was named in the squad that would compete in the 2006 Autumn Internationals against New Zealand, Australia, South Africa and Argentina. Perry scored a try for England on his debut against New Zealand on 5 November 2006, though England were defeated 41–20.

Perry made another appearance for England on 24 February against Ireland in the 2007 Six Nations match at Croke Park. He came on as a substitute replacing Harry Ellis. Perry gave away a try and a conversion after having his pass intercepted, providing an easy touch down for the Irish. However, having lost a stone in preparation for fighting for a World Cup place, his next game for England was a Man-of-the-Match performance against Wales in a World Cup warm-up match at Twickenham on 4 August 2007. A poor performance against South Africa in the 2007 Rugby World Cup led to Perry being dropped from the 22 by England coach Brian Ashton.

He missed the 2008 Six Nations Championship after sustaining a fractured windpipe against Harlequin F.C. where he was caught with a stray boot. Perry was a welder before turning to a career in professional rugby. Perry joined French club CA Brive for the 2009–10 Top 14 season.

In February 2011, it was announced that Perry has signed for Worcester Warriors for the 2011-12 season.

== Injury and retirement ==
In October 2012, he went down with a knee injury which required an operation and he was out for six months. In June 2013, he announced his retirement from rugby and a high contributing factor was the knee injury and operation from earlier in the year.

== Honours ==
Dudley Kingswinford

- National Division Three North runners up: 2001–02
- National Division Three North top try scorer (25 tries): 2001-02
