= Olly Morgan =

England international rugby union player

- Born: Oliver Morgan; 3 November 1985 (age 41) London, England
- Height: 1.88 m (6 ft 2 in)
- Weight: 94 kg (14 st 11 lb)
- School: Millfield School

Rugby union career
- Position: Fullback
Senior career
Years	Team	Apps	(Points)
2004–2013	Gloucester Rugby	131	(150)
International career
Years	Team	Apps	(Points)
2007	England	2	(0)

Oliver Morgan (born 3 November 1985 in London) is a former English rugby union player who played at fullback for Gloucester Rugby and England.

== Club career ==
=== 2004–05 ===
Morgan made 2 appearances for Gloucester during his debut season. His first start was against Saracens where he was put on the wing and he was Gloucester's sole try scorer in a 13–14 defeat at Kingsholm.

=== 2005–06 ===
During this season, Morgan made many more appearances for Gloucester competing mainly with Jon Goodridge for the number 15 shirt. Other young players such as Anthony Allen and Ryan Lamb made their debuts during the season. Morgan caught the eye with his fantastic ability to catch a high ball. Gloucester made the final of the European Challenge Cup which they went on to win but unfortunately Morgan was injured for the final at The Stoop. Overall, Morgan appeared 19 times for Gloucester in all competitions and he scored 2 tries, both in the European Challenge Cup.

=== 2006–07 ===
Morgan and Gloucester made a great start to the season by beating Bath on the opening day with Morgan scoring a try. He continued his great form and was rewarded with selection by England. Unfortunately he was injured in his second appearance for England which ruled him out of the rest of the season including Gloucester's defeat to Leicester in the Guinness Premiership Final. He did manage 4 tries in 18 appearances for Gloucester.

=== 2007–08 ===
Injury haunted Morgan once again after another fantastic start to the season. He scored 3 tries in his first 5 appearances of the season. During Gloucester's 31–7 victory at Bourgoin, Morgan dislocated his shoulder which ruled him out for nearly 4 months of the season. He returned in late March to play a part in helping Gloucester to top the table. However a dead leg meant he missed out on Gloucester's 25–26 home defeat to Leicester in the semi-finals of the Guinness Premiership. Morgan scored 4 tries in his 13 Gloucester appearances during the season.

=== 2008–09 ===
Despite an indifferent season from Gloucester, Morgan played exceptionally well. He scored many tries during the first half of the season including 2 fantastic tries against Bristol, one at Kingsholm and one at the Memorial Stadium. Another great try was scored against London Wasps at home. Overall he made 24 appearances and scored 8 tries in all competitions. His 7 Guinness Premiership tries made him joint top premiership scorer at the club with Iain Balshaw. His outstanding performances for Gloucester meant that he was named Young player of the season for the 2008/09 season and he was also runner up for the player of the season award. He was also named in the Sky Sports Dream Team for the season, selected by Will Greenwood, Dewi Morris and Stuart Barnes.

=== 2009–10 ===
Olly started at full back 16 times in all competitions for Gloucester throughout the season. Olly didn't score any tries during the season but he did play an important role in many game including playing in comprehensive wins over Harlequins (46–6) and Sale (47–3).

=== 2010–11 ===
Olly continued as Gloucester's first choice full-back for the season. He scored 6 tries in all competitions from 21 starts. Gloucester went 11 games unbeaten during the season and Olly started 9 of these games. The final game of the run saw Olly help Gloucester win the Anglo-Welsh Cup. A few weeks later Olly played a small but significant part in Gloucester's incredible 41–41 draw at Welford Road with Leicester. He scored the first try of the match after 6 minutes but a few minutes later, in the buildup to Leicester's first try, Olly injured his shoulder which would rule him out for the rest of the season.

=== 2011–12 ===
Olly started 16 out of Gloucester's first 19 games of the season, scoring 5 tries. In November he signed a new contract which ran until 2015. On 7 January 2012 he badly injured his knee which would prevent him from playing for a long time.

=== 2012–13 ===
Due to his knee injury Olly was unable to play for the entire season. On 9 October 2013, Olly Morgan is forced to retire from rugby because of serious knee injuries he sustained back in January 2012. He subsequently became Director of Rugby at Cheltenham College.

== England ==
Morgan made his England debut in the 2007 Six Nations opener against Scotland at Full Back. He played again for England three weeks later, against Ireland at Croke Park, in their third game of the tournament but had to leave the field with a season ending shoulder injury before half time. After a great 2008/09 season, Morgan was selected for England's 3 summer games, however he did not make any appearances.
