= Olivier Milloud =

France international rugby union player

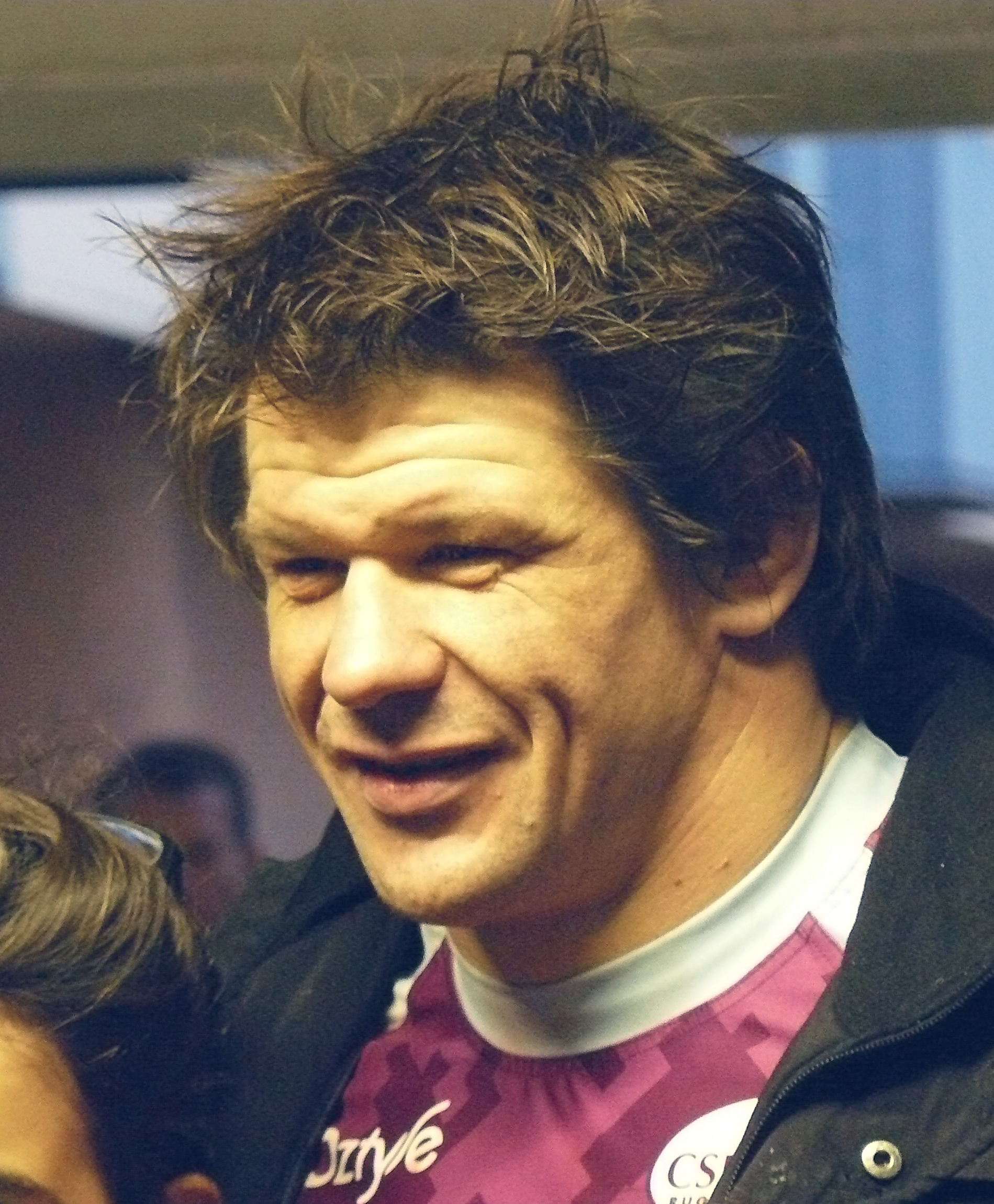
- Born: 9 December 1975 (age 50) Saint-Vallier, Drôme
- Height: 1.84 m (6 ft 1/2 in)
- Weight: 112 kg (17 st 9 lb)

Rugby union career
- Position: Loosehead prop
Amateur team(s)
Years	Team	Apps	(Points)
1994-1995	Beaurepaire		
- Correct as of March 17, 2007
Senior career
Years	Team	Apps	(Points)
1995-2011	Bourgoin		
2011-2012	Stade Français		
- Correct as of March 17, 2007
International career
Years	Team	Apps	(Points)
2000-2007	France	50	(5)
- Correct as of March 17, 2007

Olivier Milloud (born 9 December 1975) is a retired French rugby union footballer, who last played for Stade Français in the Top 14. He has also played for the France national team, including being a part of their 2003 Rugby World Cup squad. He usually plays as a prop.

He made his international debut for France in a match against Romania on 28 May 2000. He had surgery on his ankle in 2003, though he recovered in time to be named in France's squad for the 2003 Rugby World Cup. He played in five matches during the tournament in Australia. Although he did not play in the 2004 Six Nations Championship, he played three matches in 2005 and then played in France's summer and autumn internationals. He scored his first try for the France national team against Scotland on 17 March 2007 during the last match of the 2007 Six Nations Championship, which saw them win the title.
