= Paul Griffen =

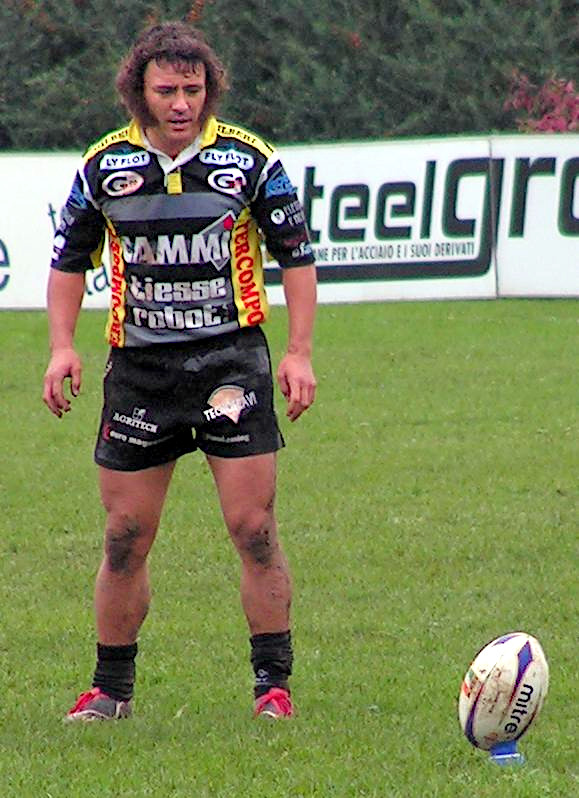
- Born: Paul Richard Griffen; 30 March 1975 (age 51) Dunedin, New Zealand
- Height: 1.72 m (5 ft 8 in)
- Weight: 85 kg (13 st 5 lb; 187 lb)

Rugby union career
- Position: Scrum-half
Senior career
Years	Team	Apps	(Points)
1993–1994	Blaketown		
1995–1999	Linwood		
1999–2000	Partenope		
2000–2014	Calvisano		
International career
Years	Team	Apps	(Points)
1993–1994	West Coast		
1997	Canterbury	1	(0)
2000–2009	Italy	42	(13)

Paul Richard Griffen (born 30 March 1975) is a former New Zealand-born rugby union player who represented Italy at scrum half in 42 full internationals. He played for Calvisano from 2000 to 2014.

== Club career ==
Paul Griffen was raised in New Zealand and played his early rugby at Blaketown RFC and at Linwood RFC, later representing the West Coast in 1993 and Canterbury in 1997 in the National Provincial Championship. In 1999, he left New Zealand and joined Partenope of Naples, a second tier Italian side where he played for one season. Griffen then transferred to Calvisano for the start of the 2000–01 season, appearing in the Super 10. He was an integral member of the team that won the Super 10 in 2004–2005 & 2007–2008 seasons and the Coppa Italia in the 2003–2004 season.

== International career ==
In 2004 he was selected by coach John Kirwan to represent Italy against England in the 2004 Six Nations Championship. Griffen had a successful tournament and was voted Italy's best player alongside Andrea Lo Cicero. He was replaced as first choice scrum-half by Alessandro Troncon for the 2005 Six Nations Championship, appearing as a replacement on two occasions. He remained a regular member of the Italy squad until 2007. The highlight of Griffen's career was his selection by Italy coach Pierre Berbizier for the 2007 Rugby World Cup, where he appeared in three games. Griffen was omitted from the national team for the 2008 Six Nations Championship, but was recalled after a 16-month absence by new Italy coach Nick Mallett for the 2009 Six Nations Championship, where he made four appearances.
