= Jamie Robinson (rugby union) =

Welsh rugby union player (born 1980)

- Born: Jamie Peter Robinson; 7 April 1980 (age 46) Penarth, Wales
- Height: 188 cm (6 ft 2 in)
- Weight: 98 kg (216 lb)
- School: Ysgol Gyfun Gymraeg Glantaf
- University: University of Glamorgan (now the University of South Wales)
- Notable relative: Nicky Robinson

Rugby union career
- Position: Centre
Senior career
Years	Team	Apps	(Points)
1999–2003	Cardiff RFC	104	(155)
2003-2009	Cardiff Blues	108	(145)
2009–2010	Toulon	16	(5)
2010-2013	Agen	44	(10)
International career
Years	Team	Apps	(Points)
2001-2007	Wales	23	(35)

Jamie Peter Robinson (born 7 April 1980 in Penarth, Wales) is a retired Wales international rugby union footballer who played at outside centre. He attended Ysgol Gyfun Gymraeg Glantaf with younger brother Nicky Robinson. He speaks Welsh fluently.

Robinson came to prominence playing for the Cardiff Blues. He played for Wales Under 19s, Under 21s, Wales A and played in the Youth World Cup in 1999 when Wales reached the final, losing to New Zealand along with fellow Cardiff Blues player Rhys Williams. Before playing his first match for Wales against Japan in 2001 where he scored a try on his debut. He maintained a place in the Wales squad until he was injured.

He suffered a long lay off through a knee injury at the beginning of the 2004–05 Celtic League, returning to action in the middle of the 2005–06 Celtic League. He immediately recovered his best form, leading to him gaining a place in the Wales squad to Argentina where he started both tests scoring one try. This was not the first time he and his brother Nicky, played together for Wales. They played their first test together against Ireland at Lansdowne Road in August 2003 in a Rugby World Cup warm-up fixture.

Robinson left the Blues following the 2008–09 Magners League, signing with the ambitious Top 14 side Toulon. After the 2009–10 Top 14 season, he was linked with a possible return to the Celtic League with the Italian expansion team Aironi, but ultimately decided to stay in France, signing with newly promoted Agen for the 2010–11 Top 14 season.

After three seasons with Agen, Robinson was forced to end his playing career in May 2013 because of injury, bringing an end to almost 15 years in professional rugby.
