= Alessandro Troncon =

Italy international rugby union player

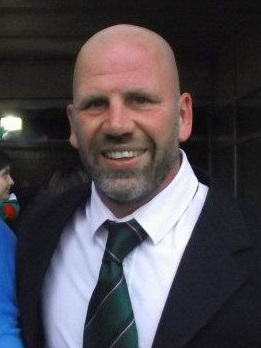
- Troncon in 2011
- Born: Alessandro Troncon; 6 September 1973 (age 53) Treviso, Italy
- Height: 5 ft 9 in (1.75 m)
- Weight: 242 lb (110 kg)

Rugby union career
- Position: Scrum-half
Senior career
Years	Team	Apps	(Points)
1991-1993	Benetton Treviso		
1993-1994	Mirano		
1994–1999	Benetton Treviso	16	(20)
1999–2002	Clermont	73	(35)
2002–2006	Benetton Treviso	10	(0)
2006–2007	Clermont	20	(15)
- Correct as of September 2007
International career
Years	Team	Apps	(Points)
1994–2007	Italy	101	(95)
- Correct as of 29 September 2007
Coaching career
- Years: Team
- 2008−2012: Italy(assistant coach)
- 2012−2013: Zebre(assistant coach)
- 2013−2017: Italy Under 20
- 2017−2021: Zebre(assistant coach)
- 2021−2023: Italy A(head coach)
- 2022−: Benetton(assistant coach)

Alessandro Troncon (born 6 September 1973 in Treviso) is a former Italian rugby union player.

Troncon is the 6th most capped player in Italian rugby union history, and the first Italian to gain 100 caps. The veteran scrum-half made his Italy debut against Spain (62–15) in 1994 and has played alongside fly-half Diego Dominguez on more than 50 occasions. He suffered a serious knee injury after the 2003 World Cup which forced him to miss the entire 2004 Six Nations, and to lose the captaincy for his national team.

Troncon spent two years at French side Montferrand before returning to Treviso.

In 2007, Troncon was named man of the match as he scored a try in Italy's first overseas victory at Murrayfield against Scotland (37–17) in the 2007 Six Nations. He was named Man of the Match in the defeat to England (7–20) at Twickenham in the 2007 Six Nations. Troncon was in the Italian squad at the 2007 World Cup, during which he made his 100th appearance for his country, in a pool-match game against Portugal (31–5). In doing this, he became only the seventh rugby union player to reach 100 caps, after George Gregan, Stephen Larkham, David Campese, Jason Leonard, Fabien Pelous, Philippe Sella and one game before Gareth Thomas. He announced he was leaving competition after the tournament.

He became assistant coach to Italy head coach Nick Mallett in 2008. In 2022, Troncon became Assistant Coach for Benetton Rugby.

== See also ==
- List of rugby union Test caps leaders
