= Perry Freshwater =

England international rugby union player

- Portrait of Perry Freshwater
- Born: Perry Thomas Freshwater; 27 July 1973 (age 53) Wellington, New Zealand
- Height: 5 ft 10 in (1.78 m)
- Weight: 17 st 2 lb (109 kg)
- School: Wellington College

Rugby union career
- Position: Loosehead Prop
- Current team: Perpignan
Senior career
| Years | Team | Apps | (Points) |
| 1995–2003 | Leicester Tigers | 70 | (5) |
| 2003–2012 | Perpignan | 107 | (10) |
- Correct as of 6 June 2009
International career
| Years | Team | Apps | (Points) |
| 2003– | England Saxons | | |
- England
- Correct as of 6 June 2009

Perry Thomas Freshwater (born 27 July 1973) is a retired English rugby union footballer. He is a loosehead prop and occasionally a hooker.

== Biography ==
Born on 27 July 1973 in Wellington, New Zealand, Freshwater started playing rugby union as a five-year-old for the Wellington club and later played for New Zealand Schoolboys against Welsh Schoolboys in Christchurch in 1990. He also played for New Zealand U19 and New Zealand U21 teams before deciding to spend a year in England playing for the Leicester Tigers.

== Club career ==
Freshwater made his debut against Nottingham in 1995 and went on to make over 130 appearances for the Tigers, many of them off the bench.

Freshwater was an unused replacement in the 2001 Heineken Cup Final, and was a used replacement against Munster in the 2002 Heineken Cup Final.

The presence of England international Graham Rowntree prevented Freshwater from establishing himself properly in the Tigers' team, and eventually in the summer of 2003 he moved to France to further his career at USA Perpignan. In his first season with the club, he was in the Perpignan team that lost to Stade Français in the 2004 Top 14 final. With USAP he won the 2008–09 French Championship, against ASM Clermont Auvergne.

== International career ==
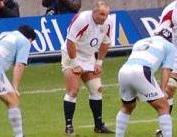
Freshwater in action for England

Freshwater qualified for England through his Plaistow-born father (he also had met the three-year residency requirement). In 2003, he received his first England Saxons cap when he played against France A in Perpignan. Freshwater went with the England Saxons team to Canada for the 2005 Churchill Cup and became Vice-Captain. The following year he was made Captain of the side against Italy A.

Freshwater made his international debut from the replacements bench during the 40–3 victory over Samoa in November 2005. He won a further two caps during the 2006 Six Nations Championship, against Scotland and Ireland.

Freshwater played in three games of the 2007 Six Nations Championship, and gained selection for the 2007 Rugby World Cup, where he played in two group games.
