= Magnus Lund =

England rugby union footballer (born 1983)

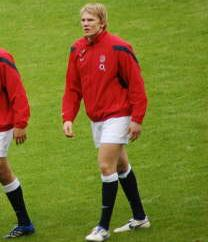
- Born: Magnus Burnett Lund; 25 June 1983 (age 43) Manchester, England
- Height: 6 ft 3 in (1.91 m)
- Weight: 105 kg (16 st 7 lb; 231 lb)
- School: Lancaster Royal Grammar School
- University: Manchester Metropolitan University
- Notable relative: Erik Lund

Rugby union career
- Position: Flanker
Senior career
Years	Team	Apps	(Points)
2002–2008	Sale Sharks	116	(55)
2008–2014	Biarritz Olympique	97	(30)
2014–2017	Sale Sharks	60	(15)
- Correct as of 7 June 2017
International career
Years	Team	Apps	(Points)
2005–2006	England Saxons		
2006–2007	England	10	(5)
National sevens team
Years	Team		Comps
2003–2006	England		Commonwealth
Medal record
Men's rugby sevens
Representing England
Commonwealth Games
Silver medal – second place	2006 Melbourne	Team competition

Magnus Lund (born 25 June 1983 in Manchester) is an English rugby union retired player.

He was educated at St Thomas's School and the Lancaster Royal Grammar School where he played for the first XV. He also studied Business Enterprise at the Manchester Metropolitan University. During his youth he represented England in both the under-16 and under-18 national sides.

Lund made his debut for the Sale Sharks in 2002 against the Bristol Shoguns. In 2002 he represented England at the under-19 World Cup in Italy. The following year he represented the under-21 team at the World Cup in South Africa. He then became a member of the England sevens side. In the 2005–06 season, Lund started the final and scored a try as Sale Sharks won their first ever Premiership title.

He was part of the 2006 Six Nations Championship Training squad, and was chosen in the 2006–07 Elite squad after a successful tour to Australia in the summer. Lund was chosen for England in the 2007 Six Nations Championship opener against Scotland, in which he scored a try as England won 42–20.

Lund playing for Biarritz

He was called up to the England squad for the 2008 Six Nations Championship.

Lund moved to Biarritz Olympique Pays Basque in June 2008 and spent six years playing for the French Top 14 club. He was a member of Biarritz when it finished runner-up to Toulouse in the 2010 Heineken Cup, and played with his brother Erik Lund there when the elder Lund joined the club in 2010. In July 2014 Lund returned to the Sharks.

== Family ==
Lund's father, Morten Lund, was an international basketball player for Norway, and stayed in England after studying in Manchester. He now lives back in Oslo, where Magnus tries to visit twice a year. Lund's elder brother, Erik, is the captain of the Norwegian national rugby union team and plays for the French Top 14 club Biarritz Olympique.
