= Elvis Vermeulen =

France international rugby union player (born 1979)

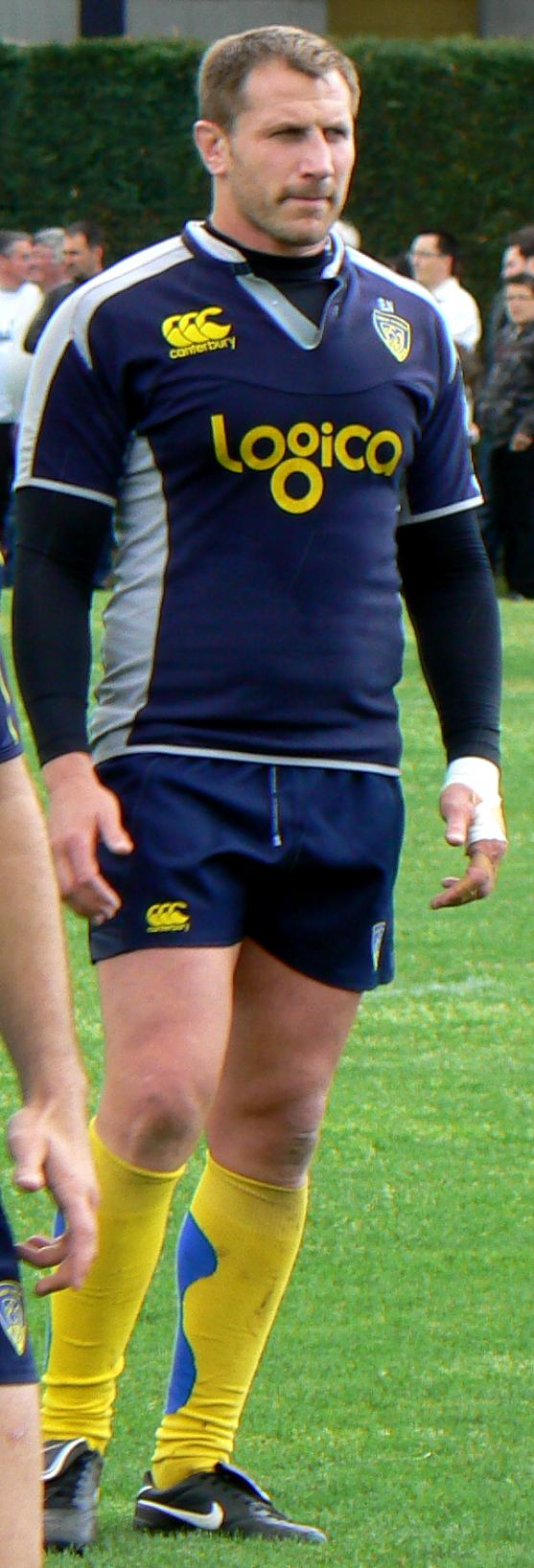
- Born: 5 April 1979 (age 47) Senlis
- Height: 1.87 m (6 ft 1 1/2 in)
- Weight: 105 kg (16 st 7 lb)

Rugby union career
- Position: Number 8
Senior career
Years	Team	Apps	(Points)
1998–2001	CA Brive		
2001–2014	AS Montferrand		
International career
Years	Team	Apps	(Points)
2001–2008	France	10	(5)

Elvis Vermeulen is a former French rugby union footballer. He played for ASM Clermont Auvergne and CA Brive in the top level of French rugby, the Top 14 competition. He has also played for the French national team, earning his first cap on 16 June 2001 against South Africa. He scored the championship winning try of the 2007 Six Nations against Scotland. This try meant France won the championship on points difference ahead of Ireland.

He played in the final as Clermont won the Top 14 title in 2009–10.
