= Marcus Di Rollo =

Scotland international rugby union player

- Born: 31 March 1978 (age 48) Edinburgh, Scotland
- Height: 6 ft 1 in (1.86 m)
- Weight: 15 st 0 lb (95 kg)

Rugby union career
- Position(s): Centre, Wing (Retired)
Senior career
Years	Team	Apps	(Points)
2001–2007	Edinburgh		(40)
2007–2008	Toulouse	1	(0)
- Correct as of 10 March 2010
International career
Years	Team	Apps	(Points)
2002–2007	Scotland	21	(13)
- Correct as of 10 March 2010

Marcus Di Rollo (born 31 March 1978 in Edinburgh) is a retired Scottish rugby union footballer. He played as a centre for Toulouse, Edinburgh, and the Scottish national team.

After moving from Edinburgh to Toulouse, Di Rollo endured a difficult time at the club. He only ever played one minute for the club due to conflicting medical opinions over a heart murmur he has carried since birth and left after a season. After a difficult season he returned to play for Scotland A in 2008.

Marcus Di Rollo was not favoured by the former Scotland national rugby union coach Matt Williams despite the support of respected Scottish rugby commentators such as Allan Massie. But under Frank Hadden, Di Rollo became a regular fixture in the national team.

Di Rollo earned his first cap as a second-half substitute in the 65–23 victory against the USA on the 2002 summer tour. He also made a try-scoring debut in the uncapped game against the Barbarians in May 2001 with an interception try. Scotland were grateful for the intervention of Marcus Di Rollo in the Autumn Test against Samoa in November 2005. The Scots were being held 11–11 by the Pacific Islanders when the then Edinburgh Gunners centre crossed over the line for his first try in the late win.

In 2010, Di Rollo was appointed head coach at Watsonians RFC.

== Tournaments ==
- 2006 Six Nations (4 appearances)
- 2007 Six Nations (4+1 appearances)
- 2007 Rugby World Cup (2 appearances)
