= Valerio Bernabò =

Italian rugby union player

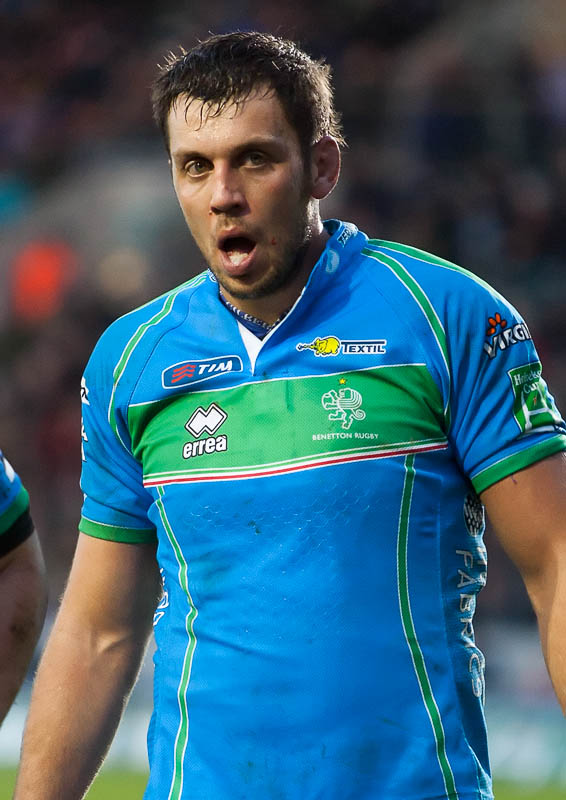
- Full name: Valerio Bernabò
- Born: 3 March 1984 (age 42) Rome, Italy
- Height: 1.98 m (6 ft 6 in)
- Weight: 112 kg (17 st 9 lb; 247 lb)

Rugby union career
- Position: Lock
- Current team: Zebre
Youth career
- Lazio
Senior career
Years	Team	Apps	(Points)
2002–2004	Lazio	17	(0)
2004–2007	Calvisano	31	(0)
2007–2008	Brive	5	(0)
2008–2009	Calvisano	12	(5)
2009–2010	Roma	19	(0)
2010–2014	Benetton Treviso	79	(5)
2014−2018	Zebre	69	(20)
- Correct as of 5 September 2015
International career
Years	Team	Apps	(Points)
2009−11	Emerging Italy	6	(0)
2004–16	Italy	33	(0)
- Correct as of 19 June 2016

Valerio Bernabò (born 3 March 1984 in Rome) is a retired Italian rugby union player. He has also been selected for the Italian national team with 33 caps, making his debut in 2004 against the USA. He also captained the Italian under-21 team. His usual position was at lock.

He played for CA Brive in 2007/08. In June 2010 he joined until 2013-2014 season Benetton Treviso for the 2010/11 Celtic League season and from 2014 to 2018 he played with Zebre
