= Andrea Scanavacca =

Italian former rugby union player

- Born: Andrea Scanavacca; 23 July 1973 (age 53) Rovigo, Italy
- Height: 5 ft 9 in (1.75 m)
- Weight: 189 lb (75 kg)

Rugby union career
- Position: Fly half
Youth career
- -: Rovigo
- Correct as of 28 January 2010
Senior career
Years	Team	Apps	(Points)
1991-2000	Rovigo	149	(2,036)
2000-2001	R. Roma	20	(225)
2001-2006	Rovigo	73	(820)
2006-2007	Calvisano	16	(198)
2007-2008	Rovigo	16	(89)
- Correct as of 28 January 2010
International career
Years	Team	Apps	(Points)
1999-2007	Italy	11	(49)
- Correct as of 28 January 2010

Andrea Scanavacca (born 23 July 1973 in Rovigo) is a former Italian rugby union footballer. His usual position was as a fly half.

He spent most of his club career (15 out of 17 seasons as senior player) with Rovigo which he entered at the age of 6. He also spent one season each with Rugby Roma in 2000–2001 and Calvisano in 2006–2007.

Scanavacca won his first cap for Italy in August 1999 against Uruguay. Since then he played 11 full international games until 2007 but never took part to a World Cup.

In 2007 it seemed likely that he would be included in the squad that would take part to the World Cup, but head coach Pierre Berbizier dropped him in June, well before the summer session of test matches that led to the tournament. Scanavacca was "disappointed".

Just some months before his dismissal, during the 2007 Six Nations Championship, Scanavacca scored 22 points against Scotland in a performance that included an interception try and 7 converted kicks. Italy won 37-17. He also scored the whole amount for his team (a try and a conversion) at Twickenham against England (that defeated Italy 20–7). The Azzurri went on to claim 4th place for the first time in the history of the tournament.

In autumn 2007 he agreed to play another season, his last, with Rovigo and in June 2008 he eventually announced his retirement at 34. "Since I joined Rovigo at 6 I have always thought I had to be the first to get on the training pitch and the last to leave, and that's what I have made ever since. But lately I was no longer feeling that way so I understand that this is time to change. I am satisfied of my career because I have always played the way I liked; I have always been proud to wear the red and blue (Rovigo's) jersey though I am aware that playing elsewhere I could have possibly won some titles", he said. He went on saying "I have no regrets, except for not having been able to show my skill in the National team. Not so many people there believed in me, maybe it was my fault, too. Not to mention injuries that did not help".

Having scored 3,368 points in his whole club career (2,945 with Rovigo, 225 with Rugby Roma and 198 with Calvisano), Andrea Scanavacca is, as of 2010, the alltime top scorer of the Italian premiership; in spite of such record he never won any title with the club he played for.

Currently he works for Rugby Rovigo as team and sport manager.
