= Stuart Turner (rugby union) =

England international rugby union player

- Born: Stuart Turner; 23 April 1972 (age 54) Southport, Merseyside, England
- Height: 6 ft 0 in (1.83 m)
- Weight: 17 st 9 lb (112 kg)
- University: University of Liverpool

Rugby union career
- Position: Prop
- Current team: Sale Sharks
Youth career
- Waterloo
Senior career
Years	Team	Apps	(Points)
- Waterloo
- Orrell
- Worcester
2000–2001	Rotherham Earth Titans	15	(15)
2001–2009	Sale Sharks	204	(35)
International career
Years	Team	Apps	(Points)
2007	England	3	(0)

Stuart Turner (born 22 April 1972 in Southport, Merseyside, England) was a rugby union player for Sale Sharks in the Guinness Premiership. In the 2005–2006 season, Turner started the final as Sale Sharks won their first ever Premiership title. He retired in 2009.

Turner's position of choice is as a prop.
