= David Marty =

French rugby union player (born 1982)

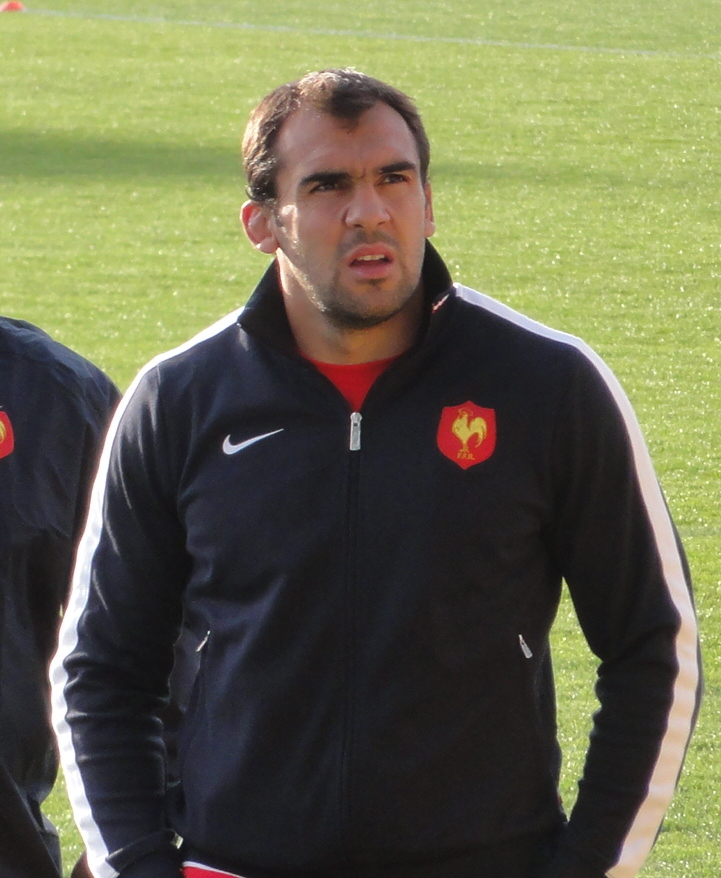
- Born: 30 October 1982 (age 44) Perpignan, France
- Height: 1.80 m (5 ft 11 in)
- Weight: 90 kg (14 st 2 lb; 198 lb)

Rugby union career
- Position: Centre
Senior career
Years	Team	Apps	(Points)
2001–2016	Perpignan	309	(205)
International career
Years	Team	Apps	(Points)
2005–2011	France	37	(55)

David Marty (born 30 October 1982) is a French former rugby union footballer who played as a centre for USA Perpignan and also for France.

Marty was first called up to the French rugby team during the 2005 Six Nations Championship, making his first appearance as an unused bench replacement in the match against Ireland at Lansdowne Road. He was elevated to the starting line-up for the subsequent match against Italy, and scored two tries in the match at Stadio Flaminio in Rome, which France won comfortably 56–13. Marty was capped in a Test against Canada in November in which he scored a try as well. He was also capped in the following match against Tonga.

Marty was included in France's 2006 Six Nations Championship squad, and was included in the starting line-up in the match against Ireland at Stade de France in Saint-Denis and scored two tries in the 43–31 victory. He was a replacement in the match against Italy as well. France went on to win the tournament. He was capped again in a mid-year test against Romania also.

Marty was selected as a member of France's 2007 Rugby World Cup squad in France and their 2011 Rugby World Cup squad in New Zealand.
