= Josh Sole =

- Born: Joshua Sole; 15 February 1980 (age 46) Hamilton, New Zealand
- Height: 6 ft 5 in (1.96 m)
- Weight: 17 st 4 lb (110 kg)

Rugby union career
- Position: Number Eight
- Current team: Heartbeat Tigers Dubai
Youth career
- 2004–05: Waikato
Senior career
Years	Team	Apps	(Points)
2005–10	Viadana	75	(80)
2010–12	Aironi	42	(10)
2012–13	Zebre	22	(0)
- Correct as of 9 October 2014
Provincial / State sides
Years	Team	Apps	(Points)
2004−05	Waikato	6	(5)
2013–15	Bay of Plenty	11	(5)
International career
Years	Team	Apps	(Points)
2005−11	Italy	47	(20)
- Correct as of 20 November 2011

Josh Sole (born 15 February 1980) is a retired New Zealand born rugby union player, currently playing for Heartbeat Tigers Rugby Union in Dubai. He played internationally for the Italian national team, making his debut in 2005 against Argentina. Sole played two games at the 2007 Rugby World Cup. His usual position was number 8.
