= Rob Dewey =

Scotland international rugby union player

- Born: 19 October 1983 (age 43) Marlborough, Wiltshire, England
- Height: 1.92 m (6 ft 4 in)
- Weight: 112 kg (17 st 9 lb)
- Occupation(s): Rugby player, Farmer

Rugby union career
- Position: Centre
Amateur team(s)
| Years | Team | Apps | (Points) |
- Heriot's
Senior career
| Years | Team | Apps | (Points) |
| 2004–2007 | Edinburgh Rugby | 22 | (40) |
| 2007–2009 | Ulster Rugby | 21 | (5) |
| 2009–2012 | Glasgow Warriors | 26 | (20) |
International career
| Years | Team | Apps | (Points) |
| 2006–2010 | Scotland | 16 | (25) |
- Correct as of 12 November 2016

Rob Dewey (born 19 October 1983) is a Scottish former rugby union player and played for the Glasgow Warriors. Despite having only come onto the professional rugby scene in the 2005–06 season, a lethal combination of pace and power gave him a name amongst the Scottish rugby community.

== Club career ==
Dewey first made his name in the amateur game in Scotland. He was the Scottish Premiership Division One joint top try scorer for the 2004–05 season while playing for Heriot's with 16 tries, and made four appearances (including two starts) for Edinburgh Rugby. This form earned him a professional contract with Edinburgh who signed him ahead of the 2005–06 season.

He scored eight tries in just 11 games in his first year of regular professional rugby union. Unfortunately, he suffered two dislocated shoulders in the same season, and so was unable to build on this tally.

In 2007, Dewey joined rival Celtic League side, Ulster, making his debut against Leinster in October 2007. After two years with the Irish provincial side, he returned to his home country and signed with Glasgow Warriors in March 2009.

== International career ==
Dewey made his debut for Scotland on 11 November 2006, scoring a try in the 48–6 victory over Romania.

In 2009, Dewey was included in Scotland's squad for the World Cup Sevens.

== Personal life ==
Dewey is a former pupil of Madras College, St Andrews.

Dewey retired from professional rugby at the end of the 2011–12 season after leaving Glasgow Warriors. He now breeds rare sheep at his family farm near St. Andrews. Rob married Rachael Pengelly on 28 July 2018.
