= Gavin Kerr =

Scotland international rugby union player (born 1977)

- Born: Gavin Kerr; 3 April 1977 (age 49) Newcastle upon Tyne, England
- Height: 5 ft 11 in (1.80 m)
- Weight: 17 st 11 lb (113 kg)
- School: Berwick County High School

Rugby union career
- Position: Prop
Youth career
- Berwick RFC
- Jed-Forest RFC
Senior career
Years	Team	Apps	(Points)
–2001	Caldy		
2001–2006	Leeds Tykes	103	(5)
2006–2007	Border Reivers		
2007–2009	Edinburgh		
2009–2010	Sale Sharks	17	(5)
International career
Years	Team	Apps	(Points)
2003–2008	Scotland	50	(5)
- Correct as of 23 February 2008

Gavin Kerr (born 3 April 1977) is a retired rugby union footballer who played prop on either side of the scrum. He played club rugby for Leeds Tykes (now Leeds Carnegie), the defunct Border Reivers, Edinburgh and Sale Sharks, and at international level for Scotland. During his time at Leeds, he helped them win the 2004–05 Powergen Cup, the final of which he started.

He debuted for Scotland in the February 2003 game against Ireland but became a regular starter for Scotland after his solid performance against New Zealand in the Autumn Test series, replacing Tom Smith after his retirement.

In April 2009 it was announced that Kerr will play for English club Sale Sharks in the Guinness Premiership. He signed a two-year deal keeping him at the Stockport based club for the 2009–10 and 2010–11 seasons. On 18 August 2010, Kerr announced he would retire from rugby due to a neck injury. Kerr currently works as a Chartered Building Surveyor.

== Honours ==
- Powergen Cup/Anglo-Welsh Cup: 2005

== See also ==
- 2003 Rugby World Cup
- Scotland national rugby union team
- Rugby World Cup 2003 try scorers
