= Dave Callam =

Scotland international rugby union player

- Born: David Alexander Callam; 15 February 1983 (age 43) Edinburgh, Scotland
- Height: 6 ft 4 in (1.93 m)
- Weight: 16 st 12 lb (109 kg)
- School: Bedford School
- Occupation: Professional rugby union player

Rugby union career
- Position: Number Eight
- Current team: Edinburgh
Amateur team(s)
Years	Team	Apps	(Points)
1996–2004	Hawick RFC		
- Correct as of 24 July 2007
Senior career
Years	Team	Apps	(Points)
2004–2010	Edinburgh	54	(25)
- Correct as of 24 July 2007
International career
Years	Team	Apps	(Points)
2006–2008	Scotland	11	(5)
- Correct as of 3 Feb 2008

David Alexander Callam (born 15 February 1983) is a professional rugby union player for Edinburgh Rugby in Scotland, he plays in the No.8 position in the back row for Edinburgh and is also a member of Scotland's 2007 RWC squad.

== Career ==
Callam became Scotland’s 999th international played when he replaced the injured Jason White during Scotland’s 48–6 victory against Romania in the Bank of Scotland Corporate international at Murrayfield in November 2006. A week later, also as a substitute at Murrayfield, he scored his first international try in the 34–22 win against the Pacific Islands, and seven days after that he made his first start in the match against Australia. His Six Nations debut followed against England at Twickenham on the opening day of the 2007 championship. Callam played international rugby at three age groups (under-18, under-19, and under-21) as well as Scotland A and the national sevens squad. His under-19 debut was in the team who beat the Australian Schools at Greenock in December 2001, and he went on to play in all four of Scotland’s matches in the 2002 IRB/FIRA world junior championship in Italy, scoring two tries, one against France and the other in the 17–10 victory against England at Treviso.

Callam played in four of Scotland’s under-21 Six Nations matches in 2003, but he missed that age group’s world cup in England in June of that year because of injury. He played for the Scottish Districts under-21 team who beat New Zealand Youth at Stirling in November 2003, and he subsequently captained Scotland in all five under-21 internationals in 2004, scoring a try in the games against Italy and France. He also captained his country during the IRB Under-21 World Championship in Scotland in June 2004 before an injury forced him to withdraw from the competition. He made his international sevens debut at the IRB Hong Kong Sevens in April 2006 before going on to the Singapore event a week later.

He was in the Scotland A squad who were runners-up in the Barclays Churchill Cup tournament in Canada in June 2006. Callam, a biomedical science graduate from Newcastle University, captained his school team whilst at Bedford School to an unbeaten season before joining Edinburgh Academicals. He was born in Edinburgh but played for Hawick before signing for Edinburgh Rugby in 2004. He is a member of the Scottish Institute of Sport.
