= Kaine Robertson =

Italy international rugby union player

- Born: Paul Kaine Robertson; 29 October 1980 (age 46) Auckland, New Zealand
- Height: 5 ft 10 in (1.78 m)
- Weight: 12 st 4 lb (78 kg)

Rugby union career
- Position: Wing
- Current team: Viadana
Youth career
- 2001: Mantova
Senior career
| Years | Team | Apps | (Points) |
| 2001–2010 | Viadana | 132 | (305) |
| 2010−2012 | Aironi | 9 | (5) |
| 2012−2014 | Viadana | 45 | (45) |
- Correct as of 18 February 2010
International career
| Years | Team | Apps | (Points) |
| 2004–2010 | Italy | 47 | (75) |
- Correct as of 20 November 2011
National sevens team
| Years | Team | | Comps |
| 2013−2014 | Italy Sevens | | 4 |

Paul Kaine Robertson (born 29 October 1980 in Auckland) is a rugby union player from New Zealand who plays rugby union for Viadana, and international rugby for Italy.

Auckland born Kaine Robertson moved to Italy in 1998, previously he played in the same Auckland Grammar school team as the All Blacks leading try scorer Doug Howlett.

== Club ==
Robertson joined the Viadana and first played for their junior squad; he made his debut for the senior squad on 22 September 2001 at Padua against Petrarca.

Robertson contributed to Viadana's victory in the 2001–02 Italian Championship with 12 tries that made him the Italian seasonal top try scorer; he went on winning two Italian Cups (in 2003 and 2007), and was part of the side that got to the Championship's final in 2008–09, who eventually lost to Benetton Treviso. He was also top try scorer in 2006–07 (9 tries) and 2008–09 (11 tries).

He joined the inaugural Aironi side for the 2010/11 season, but didn't play until January after suffering a shoulder injury in pre season, once back from injury he regained his position as starting winger, starting in all games for the rest of the season.

The season of 2011/2012 was again hindered by injury and he missed the entire season due to his 3rd knee reconstruction.

After Aironi was disbanded in the summer of 2012 Kaine chose to re-join Viadana. Many of his former Aironi teammates joined the new team Zebre.

== International ==
Robertson made his Italy debut against Romania in 2004, after becoming eligible through residency. He scored on his debut.

He made his Six Nations debut as a replacement against Ireland in 2005, but it was in 2007 that he had his finest moment in an Italy shirt. Robertson scored one of Italy's four tries against Scotland at Murrayfield to secure Italy's first ever away Six Nations win he backed this up with an incredible solo try against the Welsh team the following week in Rome with the Azzurri also winning this game.

He was selected by then Italy boss Pierre Berbizier for Italy's 2007 World Cup squad, playing in three matches as the Azzurri were knocked out at the group stages.

Robertson was back in action for the 2008 Six Nations, playing in four of five Tests before touring Argentina and South Africa in the summer. He then featured in all three of Italy's autumn internationals as they went down to Australia, Argentina and the Pacific Islanders.

He continued to be a constant member of the Italy side up until 2010 when a number of injuries halted his 15's international career.

He then continued his international career on the 7s series playing an integral part in the Azzurri making the final at Hong Kong 7s Qualifying tournament in 2014 losing that final to Japan.
