= Walter Pozzebon =

Italian rugby union footballer

- Born: 12 June 1979 (age 47)
- Height: 180 cm (5 ft 11 in)
- Weight: 90 kg (198 lb; 14 st 2 lb)

Rugby union career
- Position: Centre
Senior career
Years	Team	Apps	(Points)
2000–06	Benetton Treviso	90	(0)
2006–08	Bristol Bears	2	(0)
2008–10	Venezia Mestre	14	(0)
2010–12	ASD Rugby Paese		
International career
Years	Team	Apps	(Points)
2001–06	Italy	22	(20)
Coaching career
- Years: Team
- 2025–: Benetton (Women)

Walter Pozzebon (born 12 June 1979 in Treviso, Italy) is a rugby union coach and former international player for Italy.

== Career ==
Pozzebon's position of choice is as a centre. He used to play for Bristol in England.

He has been capped 22 times for Italy internationally.

== Personal life ==
Pozzebon graduated in communication science from the University of Padua, and later obtained a Master’s degree in sport business strategies from Ca' Foscari University of Venice.
