= Chris Horsman =

Wales international rugby union player (born 1978)

- Born: Christopher Leslie Horsman; 2 February 1978 (age 48) Newport Pagnell, Buckinghamshire, England
- Height: 6 ft 3 in (191 cm)
- Weight: 17 st 2 lb (240 lb; 109 kg)

Rugby union career
- Position: Tighthead prop
Senior career
Years	Team	Apps	(Points)
1997–2002	Bath	27	(0)
2002–2003	Bridgend	23	(45)
2003–2004	Celtic Warriors		
2004–2008	Worcester Warriors	72	(20)
International career
Years	Team	Apps	(Points)
2005–2007	Wales	14	(0)
Coaching career
- Years: Team
- 2012–2014: RGC 1404

Christopher Leslie Horsman (born 2 February 1978) is a former professional rugby union player who played as a prop. Although he was born in England and played for England at youth level, he elected to play senior international rugby for Wales after qualifying on residency; during his time with Bridgend and the Celtic Warriors, he lived in Porthcawl, where he remained after signing for Worcester in the wake of the Celtic Warriors' dissolution in 2004. He played 14 times for Wales between 2005 and 2007.

== Club career ==
Horsman attended Sheldon School in Chippenham, Wiltshire and represented England at youth international level.

Horsman started his club career at Bath in 1997 before joining Bridgend in 2002. With the advent of regional rugby in Wales, Horsman was called up to the Celtic Warriors regional side, but when the club was disbanded due to financial difficulties in 2004 he was forced to seek another club.

Horsman signed for Worcester in July 2004 and established himself as one of the best props in the English game. He signed a contract extension at the beginning of 2006 to keep him at Sixways until the summer of 2010 but in July 2009 he announced his retirement after a series of injuries.

== International career ==
Horsman was offered a place in the England national rugby union team, but two separate bouts with cancer prevented him from playing for England. During his time playing for the Celtic Warriors, he lived in Porthcawl and was approached by national team head coach Mike Ruddock about playing for Wales. It was originally thought that he would qualify through the three-year international residency rule in June 2005; however, although he had lived in Wales since June 2002, he was unable to find the paperwork to prove it and his eligibility was pushed back to September 2005.

He made his debut for Wales against New Zealand at the Millennium Stadium on 5 November 2005, coming on as a second-half substitute. He made his first start the following week against Fiji; during the game, he limped off with an injury that put his place in the team in doubt for the next game against South Africa; however, he recovered in time to start that match and the following week against Australia. He scored his first and only try against England at the Millennium Stadium on 17 March 2007. In August 2007, he was selected for the Wales squad for the 2007 Rugby World Cup, starting in the 73–18 win over Japan and the infamous 38–34 loss to Fiji that saw Wales eliminated from the competition in the pool stage. The game against Fiji was the last of his 14 caps for Wales.

== Refereeing and coaching ==
Following his retirement as a player, Horsman announced his intentions to begin training as a referee.

Horsman has also pursued a coaching career within the Welsh setup, as head coach of RGC 1404 from 2012 to 2014, and subsequent appointments within Wales' age-grade teams. In 2018, Horsman coached the Wales national under-20 rugby union team.

== Personal life ==
In 1997, Horsman was diagnosed with testicular cancer, which was successfully treated at the Royal Marsden hospital in Sutton, London; only for him to be later diagnosed with a strain of lymphatic cancer. The second occurrence of this cancer was also treated successfully and Horsman returned to rugby.
