= 2004 Six Nations Championship squads =

Rugby union competition squads

== England ==
Head Coach: Clive Woodward

1. Neil Back
2. Iain Balshaw
3. Olly Barkley
4. Steve Borthwick
5. Mike Catt
6. Ben Cohen
7. Martin Corry
8. Lawrence Dallaglio (c.)
9. Matt Dawson
10. Andy Gomarsall
11. Paul Grayson
12. Will Greenwood
13. Danny Grewcock
14. Richard Hill
15. Chris Jones
16. Ben Kay
17. Jason Leonard
18. Josh Lewsey
19. Henry Paul
20. Mark Regan
21. Jason Robinson
22. Alex Sanderson
23. Simon Shaw
24. James Simpson-Daniel
25. Matt Stevens
26. Steve Thompson
27. Mike Tindall
28. Phil Vickery
29. Julian White
30. Trevor Woodman
31. Joe Worsley

== France ==
Head Coach: Bernard Laporte

1. David Auradou
2. Serge Betsen
3. Julien Bonnaire
4. Yannick Bru
5. Nicolas Brusque
6. Vincent Clerc
7. Jean-Jacques Crenca
8. Pieter de Villiers
9. Christophe Dominici
10. Pépito Elhorga
11. Jean-Baptiste Élissalde
12. Imanol Harinordoquy
13. Cédric Heymans
14. Yannick Jauzion
15. Brian Liebenberg
16. Thomas Lièvremont
17. Olivier Magne
18. Sylvain Marconnet
19. Frédéric Michalak
20. Pierre Mignoni
21. Pascal Papé
22. Fabien Pelous (c)
23. Julien Peyrelongue
24. Clément Poitrenaud
25. Aurélien Rougerie
26. William Servat
27. Damien Traille
28. Dimitri Yachvili

== Ireland ==
Head Coach: Eddie O'Sullivan

Note: Flags indicate national union for the club/province as defined by World Rugby.

Player	Position	Date of birth (age)	Caps	Club/province
Shane Byrne	Hooker	11 February 1978		(Ireland) Leinster
Frankie Sheahan	Hooker	27 August 1976		(Ireland) Munster
Simon Best	Prop	11 February 1978		(Ireland) Ulster
Reggie Corrigan	Prop	19 November 1970		(Ireland) Leinster
John Hayes	Prop	2 November 1973		(Ireland) Munster
Marcus Horan	Prop	7 September 1977		(Ireland) Munster
Gary Longwell	Lock	30 July 1971		(Ireland) Ulster
Donncha O'Callaghan	Lock	23 March 1979		(Ireland) Munster
Paul O'Connell (c)*	Lock	20 October 1979		(Ireland) Munster
Malcolm O'Kelly	Lock	19 July 1974		(Ireland) Leinster
Victor Costello	Back row	23 October 1970		(Ireland) Leinster
Simon Easterby	Back row	21 July 1975		(Wales) Scarlets
Anthony Foley	Back row	30 October 1973		(Ireland) Munster
Keith Gleeson	Back row	21 June 1976		(Ireland) Leinster
David Wallace	Back row	8 July 1976		(Ireland) Munster
Guy Easterby	Scrum-half	21 March 1971		(Wales) Scarlets
Peter Stringer	Scrum-half	13 December 1977		(Ireland) Munster
David Humphreys	Fly-half	10 September 1971		(Ireland) Ulster
Ronan O'Gara	Fly-half	7 March 1977		(Ireland) Munster
Gordon D'Arcy	Centre	10 February 1980		(Ireland) Leinster
Kevin Maggs	Centre	3 June 1974		(Ireland) Ulster
Brian O'Driscoll (c)	Centre	21 January 1979		(Ireland) Leinster
Anthony Horgan	Wing	15 November 1976		(Ireland) Munster
Shane Horgan	Wing	18 July 1978		(Ireland) Leinster
Tyrone Howe	Wing	2 April 1971		(Ireland) Ulster
Girvan Dempsey	Fullback	2 October 1975		(Ireland) Leinster
Geordan Murphy	Fullback	19 April 1978		(England) Leicester

*captain in the first game

== Italy ==
Head Coach: John Kirwan

1. Mario Savi
2. Mirco Bergamasco
3. Marco Bortolami
4. Gonzalo Canale
5. Martin Castrogiovanni
6. Carlo Checchinato
7. Alessandro Troncon (c.)
8. Fabio Staibano
9. Roland de Marigny
10. Andrea De Rossi
11. Carlo Del Fava
12. Santiago Dellapè
13. Carlo Festuccia
14. Paul Griffen
15. Andrea Lo Cicero
16. Roberto Mandelli
17. Andrea Masi
18. Ezio Galon
19. Fabio Ongaro
20. Silvio Orlando
21. Kaine Robertson
22. Sergio Parisse
23. Aaron Persico
24. Salvatore Perugini
25. Pietro Travagli
26. Cristian Stoica
27. Rima Wakarua

== Scotland ==
Head Coach: Matt Williams

1. Mike Blair
2. Gordon Bulloch
3. Chris Cusiter
4. Simon Danielli
5. Bruce Douglas
6. Stuart Grimes
7. Andrew Henderson
8. Nathan Hines
9. Ben Hinshelwood
10. Ally Hogg
11. Allan Jacobsen
12. Gavin Kerr
13. Brendan Laney
14. Derrick Lee
15. Cameron Mather
16. Scott Murray
17. Dan Parks
18. Chris Paterson (c.)
19. Jon Petrie
20. Tom Philip
21. Robbie Russell
22. Tom Smith
23. Simon Taylor
24. Simon Webster
25. Jason White

== Wales ==
Head Coach: Steve Hansen

1. Huw Bennett
2. Colin Charvis (c.)
3. Brent Cockbain
4. Gareth Cooper
5. Mefin Davies
6. Ben Evans
7. Iestyn Harris
8. Gethin Jenkins
9. Adam Jones
10. Dafydd Jones
11. Duncan Jones
12. Stephen Jones
13. Gareth Llewellyn
14. Robin McBryde
15. Michael Owen
16. Sonny Parker
17. Dwayne Peel
18. Alix Popham
19. Jamie Robinson
20. Tom Shanklin
21. Robert Sidoli
22. Ceri Sweeney
23. Mark Taylor
24. Gareth Thomas
25. Iestyn Thomas
26. Jonathan Thomas
27. Martyn Williams (c.)*
28. Rhys Williams
29. Shane Williams

*captain in the second game
