= 2005 Six Nations Championship squads =

Rugby union competition squads

== England ==
Head Coach: Andy Robinson

1. Iain Balshaw
2. Olly Barkley
3. Duncan Bell
4. Steve Borthwick
5. Ben Cohen
6. Martin Corry (c.)*
7. Mark Cueto
8. Matt Dawson
9. Harry Ellis
10. James Forrester
11. Andy Goode
12. Danny Grewcock
13. Andy Hazell
14. Charlie Hodgson
15. Chris Jones
16. Ben Kay
17. Josh Lewsey
18. Lewis Moody
19. Jamie Noon
20. Henry Paul
21. Jason Robinson (c.)
22. Graham Rowntree
23. Andrew Sheridan
24. Ollie Smith
25. Matt Stevens
26. Mathew Tait
27. Steve Thompson
28. Andy Titterrell
29. Phil Vickery
30. Julian White
31. Joe Worsley
32. Mike Worsley

*captain in the last two games

== France ==
Head Coach: Bernard Laporte

1. Benoit Baby
2. Serge Betsen
3. Julien Bonnaire
4. Sébastien Bruno
5. Sébastien Chabal
6. Pieter de Villiers
7. Yann Delaigue
8. Christophe Dominici
9. Pépito Elhorga
10. Jean-Philippe Grandclaude
11. Imanol Harinordoquy
12. Cédric Heymans
13. Yannick Jauzion
14. Julien Laharrague
15. Gregory Lamboley
16. Brian Liebenberg
17. Sylvain Marconnet
18. Jimmy Marlu
19. David Marty
20. Nicolas Mas
21. Frédéric Michalak
22. Pierre Mignoni
23. Olivier Milloud
24. Yannick Nyanga
25. Pascal Papé
26. Fabien Pelous (c)
27. Aurélien Rougerie
28. William Servat
29. Dimitri Szarzewski
30. Patrick Tabacco
31. Jérôme Thion
32. Damien Traille
33. Ludovic Valbon
34. Dimitri Yachvili

== Ireland ==
Head Coach: Eddie O'Sullivan

Note: Flags indicate national union for the club/province as defined by World Rugby.

Player	Position	Date of birth (age)	Caps	Club/province
Shane Byrne	Hooker	11 February 1978		(Ireland) Leinster
Bernard Jackman	Hooker	5 May 1976		(Ireland) Leinster
Frankie Sheahan	Hooker	27 August 1976		(Ireland) Munster
Simon Best	Prop	11 February 1978		(Ireland) Ulster
Reggie Corrigan	Prop	19 November 1970		(Ireland) Leinster
John Hayes	Prop	2 November 1973		(Ireland) Munster
Marcus Horan	Prop	7 September 1977		(Ireland) Munster
Ronan McCormack	Prop	27 April 1977		(Ireland) Leinster
Leo Cullen	Lock	9 January 1978		(Ireland) Leinster
Donncha O'Callaghan	Lock	23 March 1979		(Ireland) Munster
Paul O'Connell (c)*	Lock	20 October 1979		(Ireland) Munster
Malcolm O'Kelly	Lock	19 July 1974		(Ireland) Leinster
Simon Easterby	Back row	21 July 1975		(Wales) Scarlets
Anthony Foley	Back row	30 October 1973		(Ireland) Munster
Denis Leamy	Back row	27 November 1981		(Ireland) Munster
Eric Miller	Back row	23 September 1975		(Ireland) Leinster
Johnny O'Connor	Back row	9 February 1980		(England) London Wasps
Alan Quinlan	Back row	13 July 1974		(Ireland) Munster
Roger Wilson	Back row	21 September 1981		(Ireland) Ulster
Kieran Campbell	Scrum-half	6 July 1979		(Ireland) Ulster
Guy Easterby	Scrum-half	21 March 1971		(Wales) Scarlets
Peter Stringer	Scrum-half	13 December 1977		(Ireland) Munster
David Humphreys	Fly-half	10 September 1971		(Ireland) Ulster
Ronan O'Gara	Fly-half	7 March 1977		(Ireland) Munster
Gordon D'Arcy	Centre	10 February 1980		(Ireland) Leinster
Kevin Maggs	Centre	3 June 1974		(Ireland) Ulster
Brian O'Driscoll (c)	Centre	21 January 1979		(Ireland) Leinster
Shaun Payne	Centre	2 February 1972		(Ireland) Munster
Tommy Bowe	Wing	22 February 1984		(Ireland) Ulster
Denis Hickie	Wing	13 February 1976		(Ireland) Leinster
Anthony Horgan	Wing	15 November 1976		(Ireland) Munster
Shane Horgan	Wing	18 July 1978		(Ireland) Leinster
Girvan Dempsey	Fullback	2 October 1975		(Ireland) Leinster
Gavin Duffy	Fullback	18 September 1981		(England) Harlequins
Geordan Murphy	Fullback	19 April 1978		(England) Leicester

*captain in the second game

== Italy ==
Head Coach: John Kirwan

1. Matteo Pratichetti
2. Mauro Bergamasco
3. Mirco Bergamasco
4. Marco Bortolami (c.)
5. Gonzalo Canale
6. Martin Castrogiovanni
7. David Dal Maso
8. Roland de Marigny
9. Carlo Del Fava
10. Santiago Dellapè
11. Carlo Festuccia
12. Paul Griffen
13. Giorgio Intoppa
14. Andrea Lo Cicero
15. Andrea Masi
16. Ludovico Nitoglia
17. Fabio Ongaro
18. Josh Sole
19. Luciano Orquera
20. Sergio Parisse
21. Andrea Moretti
22. Valerio Bernabó
23. Aaron Persico
24. Salvatore Perugini
25. Salvatore Costanzo
26. Walter Pozzebon
27. Kaine Robertson
28. Mario Savi
29. Cristian Stoica
30. Alessandro Troncon

== Scotland ==
Head Coach: Matt Williams

1. Graeme Beveridge
2. Mike Blair
3. Gordon Bulloch (c.)
4. Andy Craig
5. Chris Cusiter
6. Simon Danielli
7. Bruce Douglas
8. Jon Dunbar
9. Stuart Grimes
10. Andrew Henderson
11. Nathan Hines
12. Ben Hinshelwood
13. Ally Hogg
14. Gavin Kerr
15. Rory Lamont
16. Sean Lamont
17. Scott Murray
18. Dan Parks
19. Chris Paterson
20. Jon Petrie
21. Gordon Ross
22. Robbie Russell
23. Tom Smith
24. Hugo Southwell
25. Simon Taylor
26. Simon Webster
27. Jason White

== Wales ==
Head Coach: Mike Ruddock

1. Brent Cockbain
2. Gareth Cooper
3. Mefin Davies
4. Ian Gough
5. Gavin Henson
6. Gethin Jenkins
7. Adam Jones
8. Dafydd Jones
9. Ryan Jones
10. Stephen Jones
11. Hal Luscombe
12. Robin McBryde
13. Kevin Morgan
14. Michael Owen
15. Sonny Parker
16. Dwayne Peel
17. Mike Phillips
18. Tom Shanklin
19. Robert Sidoli
20. Robin Sowden-Taylor
21. Ceri Sweeney
22. Mark Taylor
23. Gareth Thomas (c.)
24. Jonathan Thomas
25. Martyn Williams
26. Rhys Williams
27. Shane Williams
28. John Yapp
