= 2004 Six Nations Championship =

Rugby Union tournament

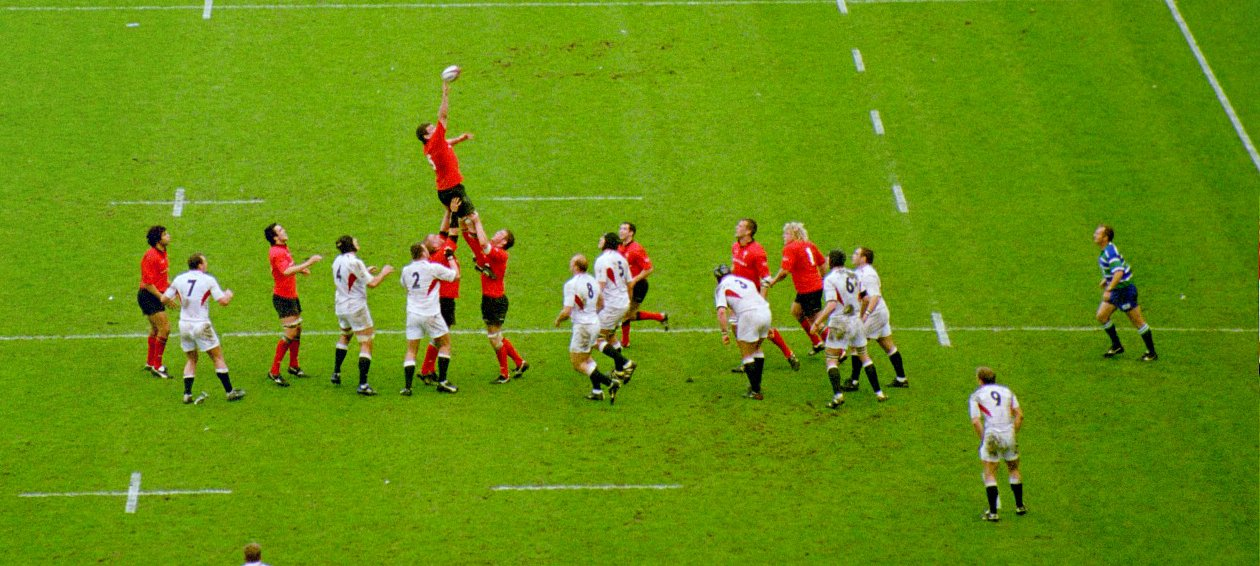
- Wales lineout at Twickenham
- Date: 14 February – 27 March 2004
- Countries: England; France; Ireland; Italy; Scotland; Wales

Tournament statistics
- Champions: France (14th title)
- Grand Slam: France (8th title)
- Triple Crown: Ireland (7th title)
- Matches played: 15
- Tries scored: 68 (4.53 per match)
- Top point scorer: (Wales) Stephen Jones (55)
- Top try scorers: (France) Imanol Harinordoquy (4) (Wales) Rhys Williams (4) (England) Ben Cohen (4)
- Player of the tournament: (Ireland) Gordon D'Arcy

The 2004 Six Nations Championship was the fifth series of the rugby union Six Nations Championship to be held since the competition expanded in 2000 to include Italy. Overall, this was the 110th series of the international championship.

Match winners received two points, with one for a draw and none for a loss. The first tiebreaker was points difference.

France won the competition, also winning the Grand Slam. Ireland won the Triple Crown, sweeping their matches against Wales, England and Scotland. Scotland were whitewashed, earning the wooden spoon as a result.

== Participants ==
Nation	Stadium			Coach	Captain	World Rugby Ranking	
Nation	Home stadium	Capacity	Location	Coach	Captain	Start (Note: As at 9 February 2004.)	End (Note: As at 29 March 2004.)
England	Twickenham Stadium	82,000	London	Clive Woodward	Lawrence Dallaglio	1st	1st
France	Stade de France	81,338	Saint-Denis	Bernard Laporte	Fabien Pelous	4th	4th
Ireland	Lansdowne Road	48,000	Dublin	Eddie O'Sullivan	Paul O'Connell/Brian O'Driscoll	6th	5th
Italy	Stadio Flaminio	30,000	Rome	John Kirwan	Andrea De Rossi	11th	11th
Scotland	Murrayfield Stadium	67,144	Edinburgh	Matt Williams	Chris Paterson	9th	9th
Wales	Millennium Stadium	73,931	Cardiff	Steve Hansen	Colin Charvis/Martyn Williams	8th	8th

== Table ==
Pos	Team	Pld	W	D	L	PF	PA	PD	T	Pts
1	France	5	5	0	0	144	60	+84	14	10
2	Ireland	5	4	0	1	128	82	+46	17	8
3	England	5	3	0	2	150	86	+64	17	6
4	Wales	5	2	0	3	125	116	+9	14	4
5	Italy	5	1	0	4	42	152	−110	2	2
6	Scotland	5	0	0	5	53	146	−93	4	0

Source: Six Nations Rugby

== Results ==
=== Round 1 ===
14 February 2004
14:00 GMT

France	35–17	Ireland
Try: Clerc 26' m Papé 50' c Jauzion 54' c Élissalde 76' c Con: Michalak (3) 51', 55', 77'; Pen: Michalak (3) 20', 32', 59'	Report	Try: Foley 43' c Howe 68' c Con: O'Gara (2) 45', 70'; Pen: O'Gara 5'

Stade de France, Saint-Denis
Attendance: 79,547
Referee: Chris White (England)

FB	15	Nicolas Brusque
RW	14	Vincent Clerc	(substituted off) 80'
OC	13	Yannick Jauzion
IC	12	Damien Traille	(substituted off) 65'
LW	11	Christophe Dominici
FH	10	Frédéric Michalak
SH	9	Jean-Baptiste Élissalde	(substituted off) 80'
N8	8	Imanol Harinordoquy
OF	7	Olivier Magne	(substituted off) 71'
BF	6	Serge Betsen
RL	5	Pascal Papé	(substituted off) 62'
LL	4	Fabien Pelous
TP	3	Pieter de Villiers
HK	2	William Servat	(substituted off) 73'
LP	1	Sylvain Marconnet	(substituted off) 71'
Substitutions:
HK	16	Yannick Bru	(substituted in) 73'
PR	17	Jean-Jacques Crenca	(substituted in) 71'
LK	18	David Auradou	(substituted in) 62'
N8	19	Thomas Lièvremont	(substituted in) 71'
SH	20	Dimitri Yachvili	(substituted in) 80'
CE	21	Brian Liebenberg	(substituted in) 65'
FB	22	Pépito Elhorga	(substituted in) 80'
Coach:
Bernard Laporte

FB	15	Girvan Dempsey
RW	14	Shane Horgan
OC	13	Gordon D'Arcy
IC	12	Kevin Maggs
LW	11	Tyrone Howe	(substituted off) 79'
FH	10	Ronan O'Gara
SH	9	Peter Stringer
N8	8	Anthony Foley
OF	7	Keith Gleeson	(substituted off) 80'
BF	6	Simon Easterby
RL	5	Malcolm O'Kelly
LL	4	Paul O'Connell	29' to 30'		(substituted off) 61'
TP	3	John Hayes
HK	2	Shane Byrne	(substituted off) 61'
LP	1	Reggie Corrigan
Substitutions:
HK	16	Frankie Sheahan	(substituted in) 61'
PR	17	Simon Best
LK	18	Donncha O'Callaghan	(substituted in) 29'	(substituted off) 30'	(substituted in) 61'
N8	19	Victor Costello	(substituted in) 80'
SH	20	Guy Easterby
FH	21	David Humphreys
WG	22	Anthony Horgan	(substituted in) 79'
Coach:
Eddie O'Sullivan

14 February 2004
16:00 GMT

Wales	23–10	Scotland
Try: R. Williams (2) 2' c, 47' m A. Jones 14' m Con: S. Jones 3'; Pen: S. Jones (2) 23', 39'	Report	Try: Taylor 79' c Con: Paterson 80'; Drop: Paterson 7'

Millennium Stadium, Cardiff
Attendance: 72,500
Referee: Donal Courtney (Ireland)

FB	15	Gareth Thomas
RW	14	Rhys Williams
OC	13	Sonny Parker
IC	12	Iestyn Harris
LW	11	Shane Williams
FH	10	Stephen Jones
SH	9	Gareth Cooper	(substituted off) 78'
N8	8	Dafydd Jones	(substituted off) 62'	(substituted in) 71'
OF	7	Martyn Williams
BF	6	Colin Charvis		(substituted off) 71'
RL	5	Gareth Llewellyn	(substituted off) 51'
LL	4	Brent Cockbain
TP	3	Adam Jones	(substituted off) 31'
HK	2	Mefin Davies	(substituted off) 65'
LP	1	Duncan Jones
Substitutions:
HK	16	Huw Bennett	(substituted in) 65'
PR	17	Gethin Jenkins	(substituted in) 31'
N8	18	Michael Owen	(substituted in) 51'
FL	19	Jonathan Thomas	(substituted in) 62'
SH	20	Dwayne Peel	(substituted in) 78'
FH	21	Ceri Sweeney
CE	22	Tom Shanklin
Coach:
Steve Hansen

FB	15	Ben Hinshelwood	(substituted off) 62'
RW	14	Simon Danielli
OC	13	Tom Philip
IC	12	Brendan Laney	(substituted off) 44'
LW	11	Andrew Henderson
FH	10	Chris Paterson
SH	9	Chris Cusiter	(substituted off) 71'
N8	8	Simon Taylor
OF	7	Ally Hogg	(substituted off) 50'
BF	6	Cameron Mather
RL	5	Stuart Grimes
LL	4	Scott Murray
TP	3	Bruce Douglas	(substituted off) 51'
HK	2	Gordon Bulloch	(substituted off) 76'
LP	1	Tom Smith
Substitutions:
PR	16	Gavin Kerr	(substituted in) 51'
HK	17	Robbie Russell	(substituted in) 76'
LK	18	Jason White	(substituted in) 50'
FL	19	Simon Cross
SH	20	Mike Blair	(substituted in) 71'
FH	21	Dan Parks	(substituted in) 44'
WG	22	Simon Webster	(substituted in) 62'
Coach:
Matt Williams

15 February 2004
15:00 GMT

Italy	9–50	England
Pen: Wakarua (2) 20', 27'; Drop: Wakarua 5'	Report	Try: Balshaw 14' c Robinson (3) 21' m, 40' m, 62' m Lewsey 57' c Grayson 67' c Jones 79' m Con: Grayson (3) 15', 57', 67'; Pen: Grayson (3) 1', 18', 34'

Stadio Flaminio, Rome
Attendance: 28,500
Referee: Andy Turner (South Africa)

FB	15	Andrea Masi
RW	14	Kaine Robertson	(substituted off) 48'
OC	13	Cristian Stoica
IC	12	Alessandro Troncon	(substituted off) 70'
LW	11	Ezio Galon
FH	10	Rima Wakarua
SH	9	Paul Griffen
N8	8	Sergio Parisse
OF	7	Aaron Persico	(substituted off) 68'
BF	6	Andrea de Rossi
RL	5	Marco Bortolami
LL	4	Santiago Dellapè	(substituted off) 63'
TP	3	Martín Castrogiovanni	(substituted off) 68'
HK	2	Fabio Ongaro	(substituted off) 63'
LP	1	Andrea Lo Cicero
Substitutions:
HK	16	Carlo Festuccia	(substituted in) 63'
PR	17	Salvatore Perugini	(substituted in) 68'
LK	18	Carlo Checchinato	(substituted in) 63'
FL	19	Silvio Orlando	(substituted in) 68'
SH	20	Fabio Staibano
FB	21	Roland de Marigny	(substituted in) 70'
CE	22	Mirco Bergamasco	(substituted in) 48'
Coach:
John Kirwan

FB	15	Iain Balshaw	(substituted off) 58'
RW	14	Josh Lewsey
OC	12	Jason Robinson
IC	13	Will Greenwood
LW	11	Ben Cohen
FH	10	Paul Grayson	(substituted off) 69'
SH	9	Andy Gomarsall	(substituted off) 63'
N8	8	Lawrence Dallaglio
OF	7	Richard Hill
BF	6	Joe Worsley	(substituted off) 63'
RL	5	Ben Kay
LL	4	Danny Grewcock	37' to 40'		(substituted off) 58'
TP	3	Phil Vickery	(substituted off) 69'
HK	2	Steve Thompson	(substituted off) 67'
LP	1	Trevor Woodman
Substitutions:
HK	16	Mark Regan	(substituted in) 67'
PR	17	Jason Leonard	(substituted in) 69'
LK	18	Simon Shaw	(substituted in) 37'	(substituted off) 40'	(substituted in) 58'
FL	19	Chris Jones	(substituted in) 63'
SH	20	Matt Dawson	(substituted in) 63'
FH	21	Olly Barkley	(substituted in) 69'
CE	22	Henry Paul	(substituted in) 58'
Coach:
Clive Woodward

=== Round 2 ===
21 February 2004
14:00 GMT

France	25–0	Italy
Try: Harinordoquy (2) 25' c, 64' c Elhorga 74' m Con: Élissalde (2) 25', 65'; Pen: Élissalde 12'; Traille 41'	Report

Stade de France, Saint-Denis
Attendance: 79,080
Referee: Alan Lewis (Ireland)

FB	15	Nicolas Brusque	(substituted off) 66'
RW	14	Vincent Clerc
OC	13	Yannick Jauzion
IC	12	Damien Traille
LW	11	Christophe Dominici
FH	10	Julien Peyrelongue
SH	9	Jean-Baptiste Élissalde	(substituted off) 77'
N8	8	Imanol Harinordoquy
OF	7	Olivier Magne	(substituted off) 79'
BF	6	Serge Betsen
RL	5	Pascal Papé
LL	4	Fabien Pelous	(substituted off) 79'
TP	3	Pieter de Villiers
HK	2	William Servat	(substituted off) 51'
LP	1	Sylvain Marconnet	(substituted off) 71'
Substitutions:
HK	16	Yannick Bru	(substituted in) 51'
PR	17	Jean-Jacques Crenca	(substituted in) 71'
LK	18	David Auradou	(substituted in) 79'
N8	19	Thomas Lièvremont	(substituted in) 79'
SH	20	Dimitri Yachvili	(substituted in) 77'
CE	21	Brian Liebenberg
FB	22	Pépito Elhorga	(substituted in) 66'
Coach:
Bernard Laporte

FB	15	Roland de Marigny	(substituted off) 7'	(substituted in) 23'
RW	14	Mirco Bergamasco
OC	13	Cristian Stoica
IC	12	Roberto Mandelli	(substituted off) 51'
LW	11	Kaine Robertson			(substituted off) 61'
FH	10	Rima Wakarua
SH	9	Paul Griffen
N8	8	Sergio Parisse
OF	7	Aaron Persico
BF	6	Andrea de Rossi
RL	5	Marco Bortolami
LL	4	Santiago Dellapè	(substituted off) 56'
TP	3	Martín Castrogiovanni	(substituted off) 76'
HK	2	Fabio Ongaro	(substituted off) 61'
LP	1	Andrea Lo Cicero
Substitutions:
HK	16	Carlo Festuccia	(substituted in) 61'
PR	17	Salvatore Perugini	(substituted in) 76'
LK	18	Carlo Checchinato	(substituted in) 56'
FL	19	Silvio Orlando
SH	20	Mario Savi
WG	21	Pietro Travagli	(substituted in) 7'	(substituted off) 23'	(substituted in) 61'
CE	22	Ezio Galon	(substituted in) 51'
Coach:
John Kirwan

21 February 2004
17:30 GMT

Scotland	13–35	England
Try: Danielli 57' c Con: Paterson 58'; Pen: Paterson (2) 2', 25'	Report	Try: Cohen 10' c Balshaw 30' c Lewsey 47' m Grewcock 68' c Con: Grayson (3) 11', 31', 69'; Pen: Grayson (3) 15', 28', 65'

Murrayfield Stadium, Edinburgh
Attendance: 67,500
Referee: David McHugh (Ireland)

FB	15	Ben Hinshelwood			(substituted off) 40'
RW	14	Simon Danielli	(substituted off) 80'
OC	13	Tom Philip	17' to 25'
IC	12	Brendan Laney
LW	11	Simon Webster
FH	10	Chris Paterson
SH	9	Chris Cusiter	(substituted off) 53'
N8	8	Simon Taylor
OF	7	Cameron Mather	(substituted off) 20'
BF	6	Jason White
RL	5	Stuart Grimes	(substituted off) 56'
LL	4	Scott Murray
TP	3	Bruce Douglas	(substituted off) 47'
HK	2	Gordon Bulloch	(substituted off) 68'
LP	1	Tom Smith
Substitutions:
HK	16	Robbie Russell	(substituted in) 68'
PR	17	Gavin Kerr	(substituted in) 47'
LK	18	Nathan Hines	(substituted in) 56'
FL	19	Ally Hogg	(substituted in) 20'
SH	20	Mike Blair	(substituted in) 53'
FH	21	Dan Parks	(substituted in) 80'
CE	22	Andrew Henderson	(substituted in) 17'	(substituted off) 25'	(substituted in) 40'
Coach:
Matt Williams

FB	15	Iain Balshaw
RW	14	Josh Lewsey
OC	12	Jason Robinson
IC	13	Will Greenwood	(substituted off) 80'
LW	11	Ben Cohen
FH	10	Paul Grayson
SH	9	Andy Gomarsall	(substituted off) 56'
N8	8	Lawrence Dallaglio
OF	7	Richard Hill
BF	6	Chris Jones
RL	5	Ben Kay	(substituted off) 59'
LL	4	Danny Grewcock
TP	3	Phil Vickery
HK	2	Steve Thompson
LP	1	Trevor Woodman
Substitutions:
HK	16	Mark Regan
PR	17	Jason Leonard
LK	18	Simon Shaw	(substituted in) 59'
FL	19	Alex Sanderson
SH	20	Matt Dawson	(substituted in) 56'
FH	21	Olly Barkley
CE	22	Henry Paul	(substituted in) 80'
Coach:
Clive Woodward

22 February 2004
15:00 GMT

Ireland	36–15	Wales
Try: Byrne (2) 1' c, 40' m O'Driscoll (2) 14' c, 52' c O'Gara 30' m Foley 47' m Con: O'Gara (3) 1', 15', 53'	Report	Try: Shanklin (2) 62' m, 76' c Con: S. Jones 76'; Pen: S. Jones 5'

Lansdowne Road, Dublin
Attendance: 49,000
Referee: Joël Jutge (France)

FB	15	Girvan Dempsey
RW	14	Shane Horgan
OC	13	Brian O'Driscoll	(substituted off) 78'
IC	12	Gordon D'Arcy	(substituted off) 58'
LW	11	Tyrone Howe
FH	10	Ronan O'Gara
SH	9	Peter Stringer	(substituted off) 78'
N8	8	Anthony Foley	(substituted off) 80'
OF	7	Keith Gleeson
BF	6	Simon Easterby
RL	5	Paul O'Connell
LL	4	Donncha O'Callaghan	(substituted off) 36'
TP	3	John Hayes
HK	2	Shane Byrne	(substituted off) 65'
LP	1	Reggie Corrigan	(substituted off) 80'
Substitutions:
HK	16	Frankie Sheahan	(substituted in) 65'
PR	17	Simon Best	(substituted in) 80'
LK	18	Malcolm O'Kelly	(substituted in) 36'
N8	19	Victor Costello	(substituted in) 80'
SH	20	Guy Easterby	(substituted in) 78'
FH	21	David Humphreys	(substituted in) 78'
CE	22	Kevin Maggs	(substituted in) 58'
Coach:
Eddie O'Sullivan

FB	15	Gareth Thomas
RW	14	Rhys Williams
OC	13	Sonny Parker	(substituted off) 55'
IC	12	Iestyn Harris	(substituted off) 69'
LW	11	Shane Williams
FH	10	Stephen Jones
SH	9	Gareth Cooper	(substituted off) 78'
N8	8	Dafydd Jones
OF	7	Martyn Williams
BF	6	Jonathan Thomas	(substituted off) 70'
RL	5	Robert Sidoli	(substituted off) 46'
LL	4	Brent Cockbain
TP	3	Adam Jones	(substituted off) 32'
HK	2	Robin McBryde
LP	1	Iestyn Thomas
Substitutions:
HK	16	Mefin Davies
PR	17	Gethin Jenkins	(substituted in) 32'
N8	18	Michael Owen	(substituted in) 46'
N8	19	Alix Popham	(substituted in) 70'
SH	20	Dwayne Peel	(substituted in) 78'
FH	21	Ceri Sweeney	(substituted in) 69'
CE	22	Tom Shanklin	(substituted in) 55'
Coach:
Steve Hansen

=== Round 3 ===
6 March 2004
13:30 GMT

Italy	20–14	Scotland
Try: Ongaro 41' m Pen: De Marigny (5) 2', 11', 40', 69', 78'	Report	Try: Webster 79' m Pen: Paterson (3) 8', 32', 38'

Stadio Flaminio, Rome
Attendance: 21,340
Referee: Nigel Whitehouse (Wales)

FB	15	Gonzalo Canale	(substituted off) 76'
RW	14	Kaine Robertson
OC	13	Cristian Stoica
IC	12	Mario Savi	(substituted off) 46'
LW	11	Ezio Galon
FH	10	Roland de Marigny
SH	9	Paul Griffen
N8	8	Sergio Parisse	(substituted off) 61'
OF	7	Aaron Persico
BF	6	Andrea de Rossi
RL	5	Marco Bortolami
LL	4	Santiago Dellapè
TP	3	Martín Castrogiovanni
HK	2	Fabio Ongaro	(substituted off) 74'
LP	1	Andrea Lo Cicero
Substitutions:
HK	16	Carlo Festuccia	(substituted in) 74'
PR	17	Salvatore Perugini
LK	18	Carlo Checchinato
FL	19	Silvio Orlando	(substituted in) 61'
SH	20	Alessandro Troncon
FH	21	Rima Wakarua	(substituted in) 46'
CE	22	Mirco Bergamasco	(substituted in) 76'
Coach:
John Kirwan

FB	15	Ben Hinshelwood
RW	14	Simon Danielli	(substituted off) 74'
OC	13	Tom Philip
IC	12	Brendan Laney	(substituted off) 78'
LW	11	Simon Webster
FH	10	Chris Paterson
SH	9	Chris Cusiter	(substituted off) 40'
N8	8	Simon Taylor
OF	7	Ally Hogg
BF	6	Jason White	(substituted off) 78'
RL	5	Stuart Grimes	(substituted off) 65'
LL	4	Scott Murray
TP	3	Bruce Douglas		(substituted off) 65'
HK	2	Gordon Bulloch
LP	1	Allan Jacobsen	(substituted off) 40'	(substituted in) 65'
Substitutions:
PR	16	Gavin Kerr	(substituted in) 40'
HK	17	Robbie Russell
LK	18	Nathan Hines	(substituted in) 65'
FL	19	Jon Petrie	(substituted in) 78'
SH	20	Mike Blair	(substituted in) 40'
CE	21	Andrew Henderson	(substituted in) 78'
FB	22	Derrick Lee	(substituted in) 74'
Coach:
Matt Williams

6 March 2004
16:00 GMT

England	13–19	Ireland
Try: Dawson 25' c Con: Grayson 26'; Pen: Grayson (2) 30', 66'	Report	Try: Dempsey 50' c Con: O'Gara 51'; Pen: O'Gara (4) 16', 23', 32', 40'

Twickenham Stadium, London
Attendance: 72,000
Referee: Paul Honiss (New Zealand)

FB	15	Iain Balshaw	(substituted off) 52'
RW	14	Josh Lewsey
OC	12	Jason Robinson
IC	13	Will Greenwood
LW	11	Ben Cohen
FH	10	Paul Grayson	54' to 63'
SH	9	Matt Dawson
N8	8	Lawrence Dallaglio
OF	7	Richard Hill
BF	6	Joe Worsley	(substituted off) 52'
RL	5	Ben Kay
LL	4	Steve Borthwick
TP	3	Phil Vickery
HK	2	Steve Thompson	(substituted off) 58'
LP	1	Trevor Woodman
Substitutions:
HK	16	Mark Regan	(substituted in) 58'
PR	17	Matt Stevens
FL	18	Chris Jones	(substituted in) 52'
FL	19	Neil Back
SH	20	Andy Gomarsall
FH	21	Olly Barkley	(substituted in) 54'	(substituted off) 63'
WG	22	James Simpson-Daniel	(substituted in) 52'
Coach:
Clive Woodward

FB	15	Girvan Dempsey	(substituted off) 62'
RW	14	Shane Horgan
OC	13	Brian O'Driscoll
IC	12	Gordon D'Arcy
LW	11	Tyrone Howe
FH	10	Ronan O'Gara
SH	9	Peter Stringer
N8	8	Anthony Foley
OF	7	Keith Gleeson
BF	6	Simon Easterby
RL	5	Paul O'Connell
LL	4	Malcolm O'Kelly
TP	3	John Hayes
HK	2	Shane Byrne
LP	1	Reggie Corrigan
Substitutions:
HK	16	Frankie Sheahan
PR	17	Simon Best
LK	18	Gary Longwell
N8	19	Victor Costello
SH	20	Guy Easterby
FH	21	David Humphreys
CE	22	Kevin Maggs	(substituted in) 62'
Coach:
Eddie O'Sullivan

Notes:

- Ireland won at Twickenham for the first time since 1994.
- This was England's first defeat at Twickenham since losing 30–16 to New Zealand at the 1999 Rugby World Cup.

7 March 2004
15:00 GMT

Wales	22–29	France
Try: M. Williams 77' c Con: S. Jones 78'; Pen: S. Jones (5) 11', 18', 22', 25', 53'	Report	Try: Harinordoquy 38' c Élissalde 56' c Con: Élissalde (2) 39', 57'; Pen: Élissalde (5) 5', 15', 44', 46', 69'

Millennium Stadium, Cardiff
Attendance: 73,359
Referee: Stuart Dickinson (Australia)

FB	15	Gareth Thomas
RW	14	Rhys Williams
OC	13	Mark Taylor
IC	12	Iestyn Harris	(substituted off) 71'
LW	11	Shane Williams
FH	10	Stephen Jones
SH	9	Gareth Cooper	(substituted off) 49'
N8	8	Dafydd Jones					(substituted off) 59'
OF	7	Colin Charvis	13' to 21'		27' to 32'
BF	6	Jonathan Thomas
RL	5	Michael Owen
LL	4	Brent Cockbain	(substituted off) 63'
TP	3	Gethin Jenkins		(substituted off) 71'
HK	2	Mefin Davies	(substituted off) 77'
LP	1	Iestyn Thomas	(substituted off) 59'	(substituted in) 71'
Substitutions:
HK	16	Huw Bennett	(substituted in) 77'
PR	17	Ben Evans	(substituted in) 59'
LK	18	Gareth Llewellyn	(substituted in) 63'
FL	19	Martyn Williams	(substituted in) 13'	(substituted off) 21'	(substituted in) 27'	(substituted off) 32'	(substituted in) 59'
SH	20	Dwayne Peel	(substituted in) 49'
FH	21	Ceri Sweeney	(substituted in) 71'
CE	22	Tom Shanklin
Coach:
Steve Hansen

FB	15	Nicolas Brusque
RW	14	Vincent Clerc
OC	13	Yannick Jauzion
IC	12	Damien Traille
LW	11	Christophe Dominici
FH	10	Frédéric Michalak	(substituted off) 78'
SH	9	Jean-Baptiste Élissalde	(substituted off) 72'
N8	8	Thomas Lièvremont	(substituted off) 58'
OF	7	Imanol Harinordoquy
BF	6	Serge Betsen
RL	5	Pascal Papé
LL	4	Fabien Pelous
TP	3	Pieter de Villiers
HK	2	William Servat	(substituted off) 67'
LP	1	Sylvain Marconnet	(substituted off) 58'
Substitutions:
HK	16	Yannick Bru	(substituted in) 67'
PR	17	Jean-Jacques Crenca	(substituted in) 58'
LK	18	David Auradou
FL	19	Olivier Magne	(substituted in) 58'
SH	20	Dimitri Yachvili	(substituted in) 72'
WG	21	Aurélien Rougerie
FB	22	Cédric Heymans	(substituted in) 78'
Coach:
Bernard Laporte

=== Round 4 ===
20 March 2004
13:30 GMT

Ireland	19–3	Italy
Try: O'Kelly 25' m O'Driscoll 32' c Horgan 52' c Con: O'Gara (2) 33', 53'	Report	Pen: De Marigny 66'

Lansdowne Road, Dublin
Attendance: 49,250
Referee: Kelvin Deaker (New Zealand)

FB	15	Girvan Dempsey
RW	14	Shane Horgan
OC	13	Brian O'Driscoll
IC	12	Gordon D'Arcy	(substituted off) 76'
LW	11	Geordan Murphy
FH	10	Ronan O'Gara	(substituted off) 77'
SH	9	Peter Stringer
N8	8	Anthony Foley
OF	7	Keith Gleeson	(substituted off) 59'
BF	6	Simon Easterby
RL	5	Donncha O'Callaghan	(substituted off) 79'
LL	4	Malcolm O'Kelly
TP	3	John Hayes
HK	2	Shane Byrne	(substituted off) 79'
LP	1	Reggie Corrigan	(substituted off) 63'
Substitutions:
HK	16	Frankie Sheahan	(substituted in) 79'
PR	17	Marcus Horan	(substituted in) 63'
LK	18	Gary Longwell	(substituted in) 79'
N8	19	Victor Costello	(substituted in) 59'
SH	20	Guy Easterby
FH	21	David Humphreys	(substituted in) 77'
CE	22	Kevin Maggs	(substituted in) 76'
Coach:
Eddie O'Sullivan

FB	15	Gonzalo Canale	(substituted off) 64'
RW	14	Mirco Bergamasco
OC	13	Cristian Stoica
IC	12	Kaine Robertson	(substituted off) 53'
LW	11	Pietro Travagli
FH	10	Roland de Marigny
SH	9	Paul Griffen	(substituted off) 76'
N8	8	Alessandro Troncon
OF	7	Aaron Persico
BF	6	Roberto Mandelli
RL	5	Marco Bortolami
LL	4	Carlo Checchinato	(substituted off) 53'
TP	3	Martín Castrogiovanni
HK	2	Fabio Ongaro
LP	1	Andrea Lo Cicero	(substituted off) 76'
Substitutions:
HK	16	Carlo Festuccia	(substituted in) 19'	(substituted off) 27'
PR	17	Salvatore Perugini	(substituted in) 76'
LK	18	Santiago Dellapè	(substituted in) 53'
FL	19	Andrea De Rossi			(substituted in) 77'
SH	20	Ezio Galon	(substituted in) 76'
CE	21	Mario Savi	(substituted in) 64'
CE	22	Andrea Masi	(substituted in) 53'
Coach:
John Kirwan

20 March 2004
16:00 GMT

England	31–21	Wales
Try: Cohen (2) 5' c, 63' c Worsley 78' m Con: Barkley (2) 6', 65'; Pen: Barkley (4) 16', 20', 39', 72'	Report	Try: G. Thomas 41' c Taylor 50' m Con: S. Jones 42'; Pen: S. Jones (3) 10', 13', 23'

Twickenham Stadium, London
Attendance: 72,200
Referee: Andrew Cole (Australia)

FB	15	Jason Robinson
RW	14	Josh Lewsey
OC	12	Mike Tindall
IC	13	Will Greenwood	(substituted off) 73'
LW	11	Ben Cohen
FH	10	Olly Barkley
SH	9	Matt Dawson
N8	8	Lawrence Dallaglio
OF	7	Richard Hill
BF	6	Chris Jones	(substituted off) 40'
RL	5	Ben Kay
LL	4	Danny Grewcock
TP	3	Phil Vickery	(substituted off) 69'
HK	2	Steve Thompson
LP	1	Trevor Woodman
Substitutions:
HK	16	Mark Regan
PR	17	Julian White	(substituted in) 69'
LK	18	Steve Borthwick
FL	19	Joe Worsley	(substituted in) 40'
SH	20	Andy Gomarsall
CE	21	Mike Catt	(substituted in) 73'
WG	22	James Simpson-Daniel
Coach:
Clive Woodward

FB	15	Gareth Thomas
RW	14	Rhys Williams
OC	13	Mark Taylor	(substituted off) 66'
IC	12	Tom Shanklin
LW	11	Shane Williams
FH	10	Stephen Jones
SH	9	Gareth Cooper	(substituted off) 60'
N8	8	Dafydd Jones
OF	7	Colin Charvis
BF	6	Jonathan Thomas
RL	5	Michael Owen
LL	4	Brent Cockbain	(substituted off) 25'
TP	3	Gethin Jenkins	62' to 69'
HK	2	Robin McBryde
LP	1	Duncan Jones
Substitutions:
HK	16	Mefin Davies
PR	17	Ben Evans	(substituted in) 62'	(substituted off) 69'
LK	18	Gareth Llewellyn	(substituted in) 25'
FL	19	Martyn Williams
SH	20	Dwayne Peel	(substituted in) 60'
FH	21	Ceri Sweeney	(substituted in) 66'
CE	22	Jamie Robinson
Coach:
Steve Hansen

21 March 2004
15:00 GMT

Scotland	0–31	France
	Report	Try: Magne 6' m Jauzion (2) 63' c, 72' c Con: Yachvili (2) 64', 73'; Pen: Yachvili (4) 14', 29', 43', 48'

Murrayfield Stadium, Edinburgh
Attendance: 66,324
Referee: Scott Young (Australia)

FB	15	Derrick Lee	(yellow card) 15'	(substituted off) 58'
RW	14	Simon Danielli
OC	13	Tom Philip
IC	12	Andrew Henderson
LW	11	Simon Webster
FH	10	Chris Paterson
SH	9	Chris Cusiter		(substituted off) 40'
N8	8	Simon Taylor
OF	7	Cameron Mather		(substituted off) 40'
BF	6	Jason White
RL	5	Stuart Grimes		(substituted off) 51'
LL	4	Scott Murray
TP	3	Bruce Douglas
HK	2	Gordon Bulloch		(substituted off) 64'
LP	1	Allan Jacobsen		(substituted off) 34'
Substitutions:
HK	16	Robbie Russell		(substituted in) 64'
PR	17	Gavin Kerr		(substituted in) 34'
LK	18	Nathan Hines		(substituted in) 51'
FL	19	Ally Hogg		(substituted in) 40'
SH	20	Mike Blair		(substituted in) 40'
FH	21	Brendan Laney
FH	22	Dan Parks		(substituted in) 58'
Coach:
Matt Williams

FB	15	Nicolas Brusque
RW	14	Pépito Elhorga
OC	13	Yannick Jauzion
IC	12	Damien Traille
LW	11	Christophe Dominici
FH	10	Frédéric Michalak	(substituted off) 40'
SH	9	Dimitri Yachvili
N8	8	Thomas Lièvremont		(substituted off) 49'
OF	7	Olivier Magne
BF	6	Serge Betsen	(substituted off) 21'
RL	5	Pascal Papé	(substituted off) 71'
LL	4	Fabien Pelous
TP	3	Pieter de Villiers
HK	2	William Servat	(substituted off) 51'
LP	1	Sylvain Marconnet	(substituted off) 63'
Substitutions:
HK	16	Yannick Bru	(substituted in) 51'
PR	17	Jean-Jacques Crenca	(substituted in) 63'
LK	18	David Auradou	(substituted in) 71'
FL	19	Julien Bonnaire	(substituted in) 21'	(substituted off) 49'
FH	20	Julien Peyrelongue	(substituted in) 40'
FB	21	Clément Poitrenaud
WG	22	Vincent Clerc
Coach:
Bernard Laporte

Notes:

- This was the first time since 1961 that France had kept a clean sheet against Scotland.

=== Round 5 ===
27 March 2004
14:00 GMT

Wales	44–10	Italy
Try: S. Williams (2) 24' m, 67' c R. Williams (2) 30' m, 70' c G. Thomas 55' c Shanklin 59' c Con: S. Jones (4) 56', 60', 68', 71'; Pen: S. Jones (2) 10', 16'	Report	Try: Masi 62' c Con: Staibano 63'; Pen: De Marigny 42'

Millennium Stadium, Cardiff
Attendance: 70,048
Referee: Mark Lawrence (South Africa)

FB	15	Gareth Thomas
RW	14	Rhys Williams
OC	13	Mark Taylor
IC	12	Iestyn Harris	(substituted off) 59'
LW	11	Shane Williams
FH	10	Stephen Jones	(substituted off) 73'
SH	9	Gareth Cooper	(substituted off) 73'
N8	8	Dafydd Jones	(substituted off) 76'
OF	7	Martyn Williams
BF	6	Colin Charvis
RL	5	Michael Owen	(substituted off) 79'
LL	4	Gareth Llewellyn
TP	3	Gethin Jenkins
HK	2	Robin McBryde	(substituted off) 73'
LP	1	Duncan Jones	(substituted off) 79'
Substitutions:
HK	16	Mefin Davies	(substituted in) 73'
PR	17	Ben Evans	(substituted in) 79'
LK	18	Robert Sidoli	(substituted in) 79'
N8	19	Alix Popham	(substituted in) 76'
SH	20	Dwayne Peel	(substituted in) 73'
FH	21	Ceri Sweeney	(substituted in) 73'
CE	22	Tom Shanklin	(substituted in) 59'
Coach:
Steve Hansen

FB	15	Silvio Orlando
RW	14	Mirco Bergamasco	(substituted off) 65'
OC	13	Andrea Masi	(substituted off) 73'
IC	12	Kaine Robertson
LW	11	Fabio Staibano	(substituted off) 53'
FH	10	Roland de Marigny
SH	9	Paul Griffen
N8	8	Roberto Mandelli
OF	7	Aaron Persico	11' to 21'		(substituted off) 37'
BF	6	Rima Wakarua
RL	5	Carlo Del Fava	(substituted off) 58'
LL	4	Santiago Dellapè
TP	3	Martín Castrogiovanni	(substituted off) 58'
HK	2	Fabio Ongaro
LP	1	Alessandro Troncon
Substitutions:
HK	16	Carlo Festuccia
PR	17	Salvatore Perugini	(substituted in) 58'
FL	18	Andrea Lo Cicero	(substituted in) 58'
FL	19	Ezio Galon	(substituted in) 11'	(substituted off) 21'	(substituted in) 37'
SH	20	Marco Bortolami	(substituted in) 73'
FH	21	Andrea De Rossi	(substituted in) 53'
CE	22	Cristian Stoica	(substituted in) 65'
Coach:
John Kirwan

27 March 2004
16:00 GMT

Ireland	37–16	Scotland
Try: D'Arcy (2) 18' m, 72' c Murphy 38' m Wallace 53' c Stringer 61' c Con: O'Gara (3) 54', 62', 73'; Pen: O'Gara (2) 4', 25'	Report	Try: Hogg 48' c Con: Paterson 49'; Pen: Paterson (2) 1', 22'; Drop: Parks 36'

Lansdowne Road, Dublin
Attendance: 42,750
Referee: Nigel Williams (Wales)

FB	15	Girvan Dempsey
RW	14	Shane Horgan
OC	13	Brian O'Driscoll
IC	12	Gordon D'Arcy	(substituted off) 78'
LW	11	Geordan Murphy
FH	10	Ronan O'Gara	(substituted off) 78'
SH	9	Peter Stringer	(substituted off) 78'
N8	8	Anthony Foley
OF	7	David Wallace	(substituted off) 78'
BF	6	Simon Easterby
RL	5	Paul O'Connell
LL	4	Malcolm O'Kelly	50' to 54'		(substituted off) 78'
TP	3	John Hayes
HK	2	Shane Byrne	(substituted off) 78'
LP	1	Reggie Corrigan	(substituted off) 60'
Substitutions:
HK	16	Frankie Sheahan	(substituted in) 78'
PR	17	Marcus Horan	(substituted in) 60'
LK	18	Donncha O'Callaghan	(substituted in) 50'	(substituted off) 54'	(substituted in) 78'
N8	19	Victor Costello	(substituted in) 78'
SH	20	Guy Easterby	(substituted in) 78'
FH	21	David Humphreys	(substituted in) 78'
CE	22	Kevin Maggs	(substituted in) 78'
Coach:
Eddie O'Sullivan

FB	15	Chris Paterson
RW	14	Simon Danielli	(substituted off) 76'
OC	13	Tom Philip
IC	12	Andrew Henderson	(substituted off) 65'
LW	11	Simon Webster
FH	10	Dan Parks
SH	9	Chris Cusiter	(substituted off) 57'
N8	8	Simon Taylor	(substituted off) 41'
OF	7	Ally Hogg
BF	6	Jason White
RL	5	Stuart Grimes	(substituted off) 57'
LL	4	Scott Murray
TP	3	Bruce Douglas		(substituted off) 72'
HK	2	Gordon Bulloch	(substituted off) 72'
LP	1	Allan Jacobsen	(substituted off) 40'	(substituted in) 72'
Substitutions:
HK	16	Robbie Russell	(substituted in) 72'
PR	17	Gavin Kerr	(substituted in) 40'
LK	18	Nathan Hines	(substituted in) 57'
FL	19	Jon Petrie	(substituted in) 41'
SH	20	Mike Blair	(substituted in) 57'
FH	21	Brendan Laney	(substituted in) 65'
FB	22	Derrick Lee	(substituted in) 76'
Coach:
Matt Williams

27 March 2004
20:00 GMT

France	24–21	England
Try: Harinordoquy 25' m Yachvili 40' c Con: Yachvili 40'; Pen: Yachvili (4) 21', 34', 39', 51'	Report	Try: Cohen 52' m Lewsey 75' c Con: Barkley 77'; Pen: Barkley (3) 40', 48', 72'

Stade de France, Saint-Denis
Attendance: 79,906
Referee: Alain Rolland (Ireland)

FB	15	Nicolas Brusque
RW	14	Pépito Elhorga
OC	13	Yannick Jauzion	(substituted off) 57'
IC	12	Damien Traille
LW	11	Christophe Dominici
FH	10	Frédéric Michalak
SH	9	Dimitri Yachvili
N8	8	Imanol Harinordoquy
OF	7	Olivier Magne
BF	6	Serge Betsen
RL	5	Pascal Papé
LL	4	Fabien Pelous	(substituted off) 77'
TP	3	Pieter de Villiers
HK	2	William Servat	(substituted off) 53'
LP	1	Sylvain Marconnet	(substituted off) 71'
Substitutions:
HK	16	Yannick Bru	(substituted in) 53'
PR	17	Jean-Jacques Crenca	(substituted in) 71'
LK	18	David Auradou	(substituted in) 77'
N8	19	Thomas Lièvremont
SH	20	Pierre Mignoni
FH	21	Julien Peyrelongue
FB	22	Clément Poitrenaud	(substituted in) 57'
Coach:
Bernard Laporte

FB	15	Jason Robinson
RW	14	Josh Lewsey
OC	12	Mike Tindall
IC	13	Will Greenwood	(substituted off) 48'
LW	11	Ben Cohen
FH	10	Olly Barkley
SH	9	Matt Dawson
N8	8	Lawrence Dallaglio
OF	7	Richard Hill
BF	6	Joe Worsley
RL	5	Ben Kay
LL	4	Danny Grewcock	(substituted off) 25'
TP	3	Phil Vickery	(substituted off) 63'
HK	2	Steve Thompson
LP	1	Trevor Woodman
Substitutions:
HK	16	Mark Regan
PR	17	Julian White	(substituted in) 63'
LK	18	Steve Borthwick	(substituted in) 25'
FL	19	Chris Jones
SH	20	Andy Gomarsall
CE	21	Mike Catt	(substituted in) 48'
WG	22	James Simpson-Daniel
Coach:
Clive Woodward

Notes:

- England needed to win by eight points to win the Championship.
