= Student rugby =

Student Rugby could refer to more than one topic.

- Student Rugby League, the organisation which administrates university and college rugby leagues in the United Kingdom
- Student rugby union, a collegiate version of rugby union administered by the Irish Rugby Football Union
