= Tom Philip =

Scotland international rugby union & league footballer

Thomas Philip
- Born: Thomas Kenneth Philip; 25 June 1983 (age 43) Edinburgh, Scotland
- Height: 1.83 m (6 ft 0 in)
- Weight: 95 kg (14 st 13 lb)

Rugby union career
- Position: Centre
Amateur team(s)
Years	Team	Apps	(Points)
2001-02	Glasgow Hawks RFC		
2008-09	Edinburgh Academicals	4	
Senior career
Years	Team	Apps	(Points)
2003-05	Edinburgh Rugby		
- Correct as of 18 December 2012
International career
Years	Team	Apps	(Points)
2004	Scotland	5	(0)
- Correct as of 18 December 2012
Coaching career
- Years: Team
- 2012-13: Haddington RFC
- Rugby league career

Playing information
Club
Years	Team	Pld	T	G	FG	P
2010	Whitehaven
	Edinburgh Eagles
	South Wales Scorpions
	Total	0	0	0	0	0

Tom Philip (born 25 June 1983) is a Scottish former rugby union and rugby league footballer who played as centre. He made five international appearances for the Scotland national team. He played rugby union for Edinburgh Rugby (2003–2005) and Edinburgh Academicals (2008–9), before switching to rugby league and playing for Whitehaven, Edinburgh Eagles and South Wales Scorpions. He coached Haddington rugby club.

== Early life ==
Philip was born in Edinburgh, Scotland.

== Rugby career ==
In 2001 Philip played at centre for BT Premiership Division One side Glasgow Hawks RFC. While only out of school, he was already being recognised as possessing power and talent. He featured for Hawks in the 2002 BT Cellnet Cup final, where they lost to Hawick RFC.

In May 2002, age 18, he was signed by Edinburgh Rugby. Philip had already been selected for the 2002 tour of North America and he played three uncapped matches for Scotland. He played for the under-21 rugby team in February 2003.

He was named in the Scotland squad by coach Matt Williams ahead of the 2004 Six Nations Championship. He made his international debut against Wales in Cardiff. He played in all five matches of the tournament. Following the Ireland match he was reported for a high tackle, but received no sanction. In May 2004, he appeared for Scotland at Murrayfield against Barbarian F.C.

In June 2004, while on Scotland's summer tour of Oceania, Philip sustained a torn anterior cruciate knee injury during a training drill. Despite recovering from this injury, he experienced persistent chronic back and groin pain that forced him to announce a break from sport in November 2005 at the age of only 22.

He returned to play for Scottish Premiership Division One side Edinburgh Academicals, making four starts in 2008–2009, after having part of his spine fused in 2005.

In April 2010, he returned to professional sport, switching codes to league in 2010 when he signed a three-month contract to play for RFL Championship team Whitehaven. He also then played for Edinburgh Eagles and South Wales Scorpions in the Championship One.

He did some coaching with Edinburgh Academicals, then in May 2012, Haddington RFC appointed him as head coach at the age of just 28. Just over a year later he had left this position.

== Personal Info ==
Philip has spoken about his experience with over-exercising, linking this to the mental health difficulties, having to come to terms with his playing career being cut short.
