= Silvio Orlando (rugby union) =

Italian rugby union player (born 1981)

Silvio Orlando (born 9 February 1981 in Venice) is an Italian rugby union player. He plays as a flanker.

Orlando first played for San Marco Mogliano, moving to Benetton Treviso, aged 18 years old, in the 1999–00 season, where he played until 2009–10. He won 5 titles of Italian Champion, in 2002–03, 2003–04, 2005–06, 2006–07 and 2008–09, and one Cup of Italy, in 2004–05. He moved to Mogliano for the 2010–11 season.

The Italian flanker has 14 caps for Italy, from 2004 to 2007, without ever scoring. He played one match at the 2007 Rugby World Cup, being chosen as replacement for the injured Robert Barbieri. He played in the 2004 Six Nations Championship and the 2005 Six Nations Championship, playing in five matches. He has also played for the Italy A team.
