= William Servat =

French rugby union player (born 1978)

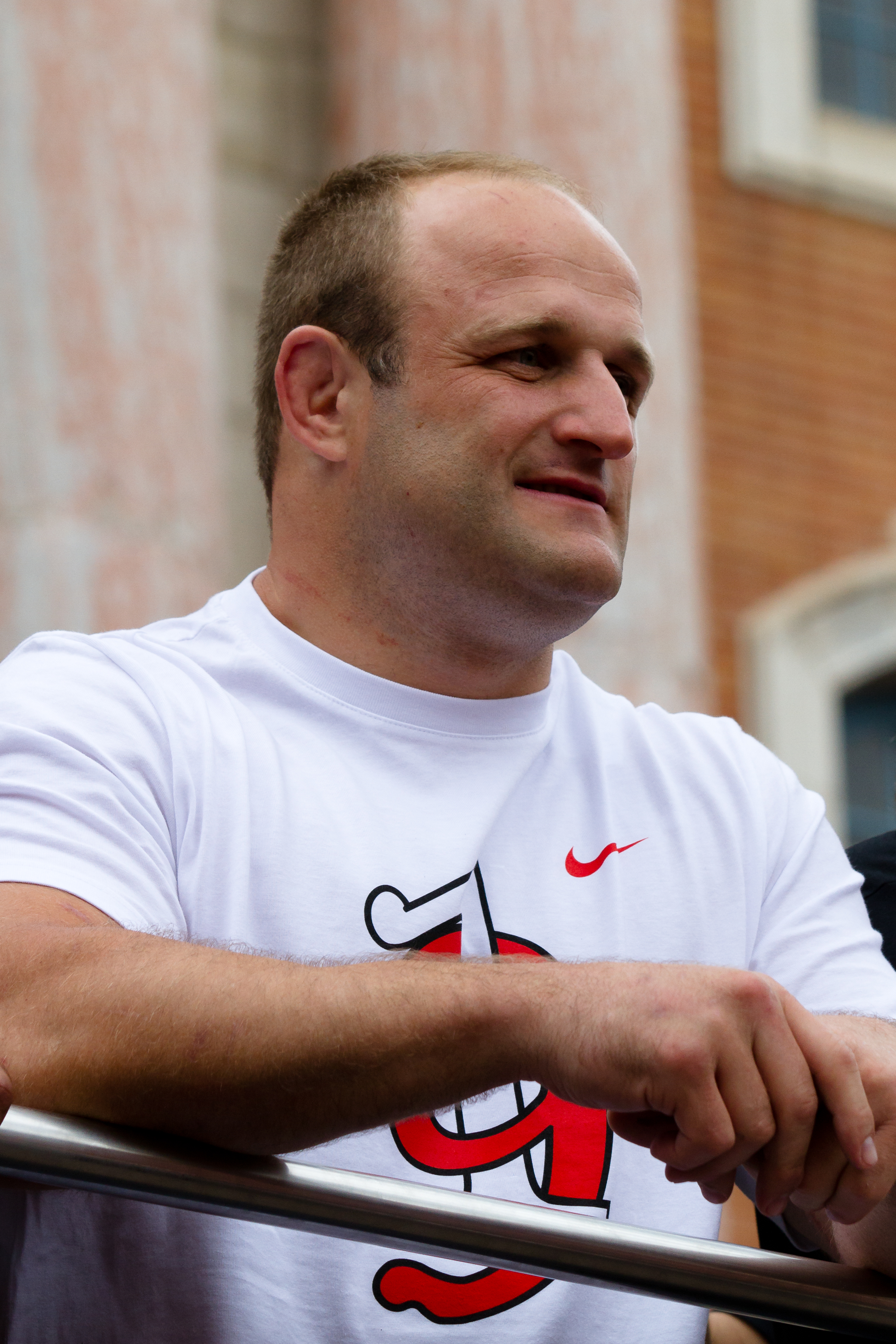
- William Servat, June 2012
- Born: William Servat; February 9, 1978 (age 48) Saint-Gaudens, France
- Height: 6 ft 0 in (1.83 m)
- Weight: 110 kg (240 lb; 17 st 5 lb)

Rugby union career
- Position: Hooker
Amateur team(s)
Years	Team	Apps	(Points)
- Mazères-Cassagne
1993–1999	Toulouse		
Senior career
Years	Team	Apps	(Points)
1999–2013	Toulouse	315	(95)
International career
Years	Team	Apps	(Points)
2004–2012	France	49	(10)
Coaching career
- Years: Team
- 2012–2019: Toulouse (forwards)
- 2019–: France (forwards)

William Servat (born 9 December 1978 in Saint-Gaudens, France) is a former French rugby union footballer and is currently an assistant coach for the France national team. Servat played as a hooker for Toulouse in the Top 14 club competition and for France at international level. Servat was regarded as one of the top hookers in the world in the late 2000's, culminating in 2010 Grand Slam & European Cup wins.

== Career ==
=== Club career ===
Born in Saint-Gaudens in the Haute-Garonne département of France, Servat began his rugby career at his local club, Mazères-Cassagne. He played for Mazères-Cassagne until 1998, when he was signed by Toulouse. In his first season at Toulouse, Servat helped the club to their fifth Top 14 title in six years. He has since been involved with just one more Top 14 title victory (in 2001), but he has helped the club to three Heineken Cup titles in 2002–03, playing as a replacement in the final, and starting in the 2004–05 and 2009-10 finals.

=== International career ===
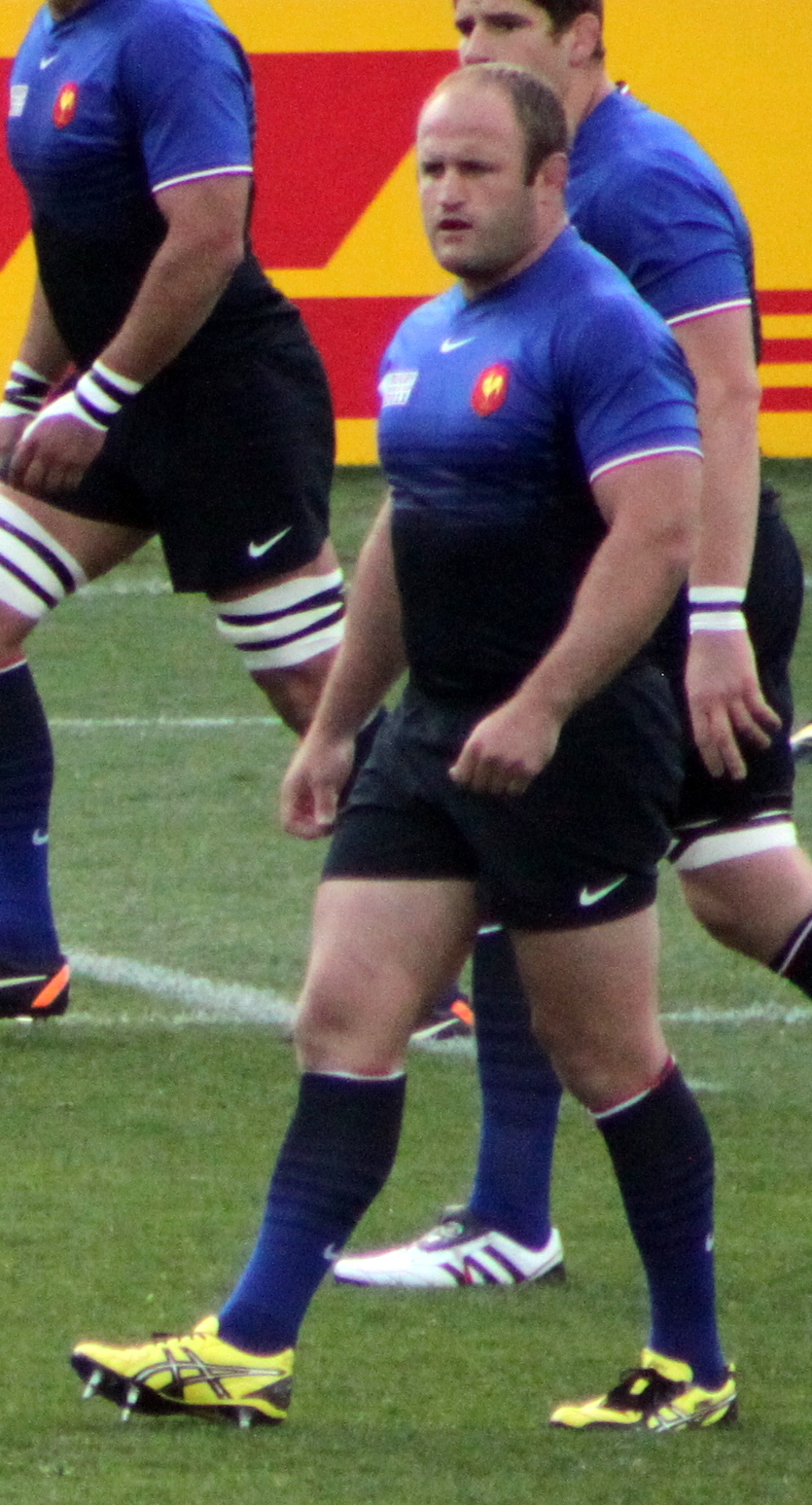
Servat during 2011 Rugby World Cup

Servat made his debut for the France national team on 14 February 2004 in a 35–17 victory over Ireland in the 2004 Six Nations Championship. That year, France won the Six Nations Grand Slam, by beating every other team in the competition, with Servat playing in every game. The following year, France came second in the Six Nations, finishing as runners-up to Wales. Servat only made one start in the 2005 tournament, but made three substitute appearances as well. Servat has now retired.

Servat was a playing member of the French 2011 Rugby World Cup squad that eventually lost 8-7 to hosts New Zealand in the final.

=== Coaching career ===
On 15 February 2012, Servat announced that he had accepted an offer to become the forwards coach at Toulouse, effective with the 2012–13 season. The position was opened up when incumbent Yannick Bru agreed to join the staff of the France national team under Philippe Saint-André after the 2011–12 season.

Servat followed suite in 2019 and took up the post of forwards coach for the France national team under head coach Fabien Galthié.

== Honours ==
=== Club ===
==== Toulouse (1998–present) ====
- Top 14
  - Winner: 1999, 2001, 2008, 2011, 2012
  - Runner-up: 2003, 2006
- Heineken Cup
  - Winner: 2003, 2005, 2010
  - Runner-up: 2004, 2008

=== International ===
- Six Nations
  - Winner: 2004, 2010
  - Runner-up: 2005
- World Cup
  - Runner-up: 2011
