= Duncan Jones (rugby union) =

Wales international rugby union footballer (born 1978)

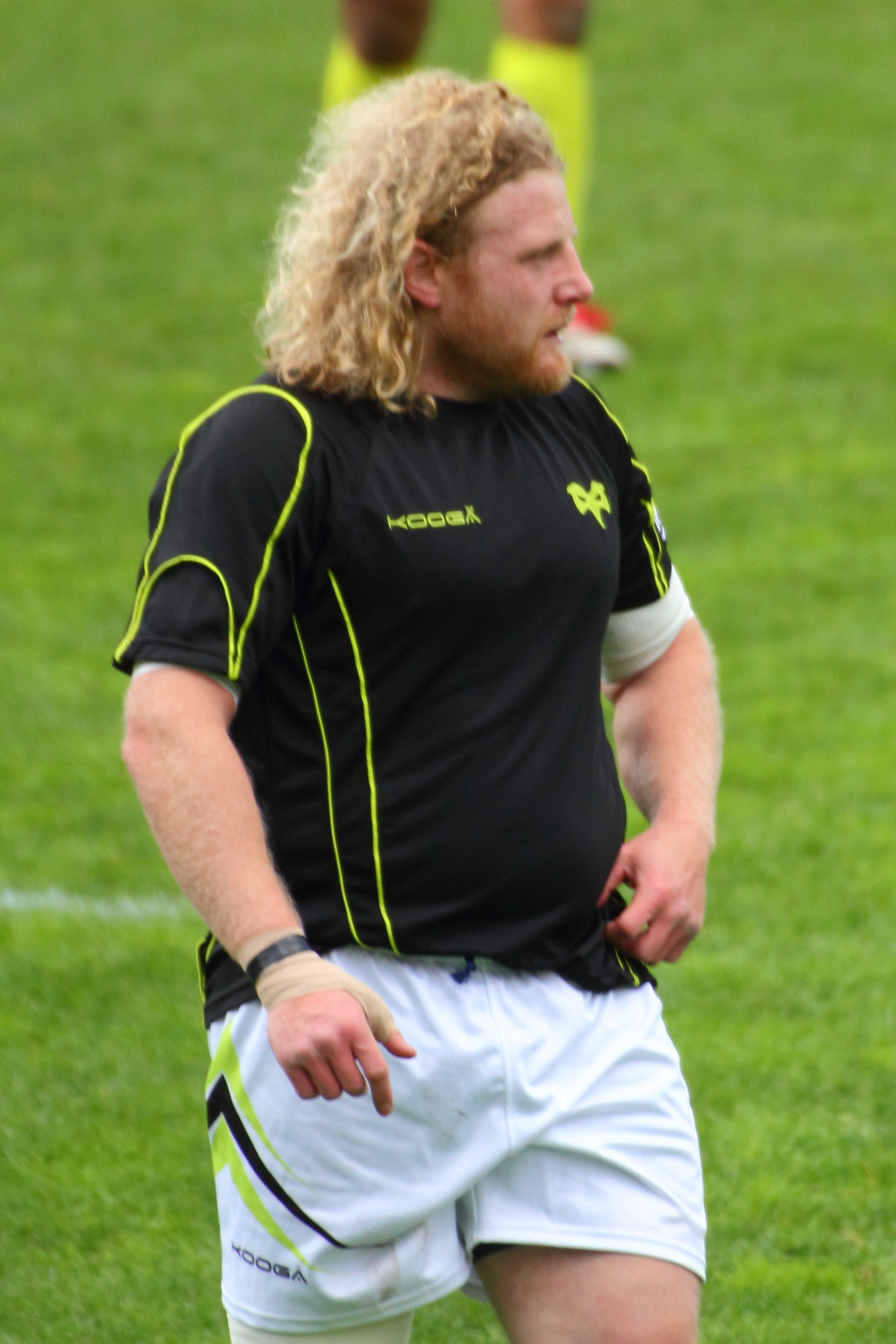
- Born: Duncan James Jones; 18 September 1978 (age 48) Neath, Wales
- Height: 183 cm (6 ft 0 in)
- Weight: 110 kg (17 st 5 lb; 243 lb)
- School: Cymer Afan Comprehensive School
- University: Neath College

Rugby union career
- Position: Prop
Senior career
Years	Team	Apps	(Points)
1998–2003	Neath	105	(40)
2003–2015	Ospreys	219	(20)
International career
Years	Team	Apps	(Points)
2001–2009	Wales	57	(0)

Duncan James Jones (born 18 September 1978 in Neath and brought up in Blaengwynfi, Port Talbot) is a former Welsh rugby union player who played at loose head prop for the Ospreys in the Pro12 and has played for Wales.

== Career ==
=== First-class career ===
Jones was educated at Cymer Afan Comprehensive School and Neath College. He has represented Wales at every level from Schools up to the national side, including the Grand Slam-winning Under-21 side of 1999. Jones played at both loosehead and tighthead at school level. During the early part of his professional career with Neath he played at tighthead but switched to loosehead in 2001.

He made his first-class debut for Neath RFC in 1999 and played for the club until the end of the 2002–03 season, when, following a reorganisation of Welsh rugby, Jones transferred to what was then the Neath-Swansea Ospreys. He made his debut for the Ospreys on 10 January 2004. However he was soon followed by Adam Jones who made his first appearance for Ospreys on 13 March 2004 against Stade Toulousain.

In 2005–06, Duncan Jones took over as captain of the Ospreys, following an injury to Barry Williams, and he was appointed captain for the 2006–07 season, during which he led the team to the Celtic League title.

=== International career ===
He made his debut for Wales on 25 November 2001, coming on as a substitute in the Autumn International against Australia. In the 2002 Six Nations Championship, he made two appearances as a substitute, against France and Ireland.

Jones made his first start for Wales in August 2003, playing in two warm-up matches, against Ireland and Scotland. He was selected in the squad for the 2003 Rugby World Cup and started in two pool games, against Canada and Italy, but suffered a fractured fibula during the game against Italy and had to return home, being replaced by Ospreys teammate Paul James.

He returned from injury in time to start three games in the 2004 Six Nations Championship; he also started in both Tests against Argentina and came on as a replacement against South Africa on Wales's mid-year tour.

Jones played in the 2004 Autumn Internationals but a dislocated thumb, sustained during a Heineken Cup match between the Ospreys and Munster in January 2005, meant that he was unavailable for the 2005 Six Nations Championship, in which Wales achieved the Grand Slam. He returned to the Welsh team for a two-game tour to the USA and Canada in June 2005.

In 2005–06, Jones started in all but one of Wales's Autumn Internationals (he missed the game against Fiji) and in all their 2006 Six Nations Championship matches, following which he was chosen by new coach Gareth Jenkins to captain the side during a mid-year two-Test tour of Argentina. In October 2006, Jenkins appointed Stephen Jones to captain Wales through to the 2007 Rugby World Cup, but when Stephen Jones was rested for the Autumn International against the Pacific Islanders, Duncan Jones returned to captain Wales at home for the first time. He played, as starter or substitute, in all four Autumn Internationals and all five matches in the 2007 Six Nations Championship, but was rested for the mid-year tour to Australia.

Jones was named in the Welsh squad for the 2007 World Cup, and started in the warm-up games against Argentina and France, but though he played in all four pool games during the tournament, he only started in one game, against Japan. He subsequently featured as a substitute in a one-off Test against new World Champions, South Africa, in November 2007 and started in Wales's first two games in the 2008 Six Nations Championship, against England and Scotland.

=== Skills ===
Jones plays as a prop, a position where he is smaller than the positional average. However, his style of play is characterized by mobility, speed, and handling skills comparable to those of a backline plater. In addition to his contributions as a ball-carrier, he is effective in the scrum and is noted for his defensive tackling work rate.
