= Fabio Staibano =

Italian rugby union player

- Born: 20 April 1983 (age 43) Eboli, Italy
- Height: 1.84 m (6 ft 0 in)
- Weight: 119 kg (18 st 10 lb; 262 lb)

Rugby union career
- Position: Prop
Youth career
- Parma
Senior career
Years	Team	Apps	(Points)
2002–2008	Crociati Parma	78	(10)
2008−2010	Castres Olympique	7	(0)
2010–2012	Aironi	36	(0)
2012–2013	Wasps	8	(5)
2013–2014	Petrarca Padova	14	(10)
2014–2016	Lyons Piacenza	10	(0)
2016–2017	Amatori Capoterra		
2017–2018	Arechi Rugby	7	(10)
2018–2019	Amatori Parma	7	(10)
2019–2020	Parma		
- Correct as of 1 February 2020
International career
Years	Team	Apps	(Points)
2011	Italy A	3	(0)
2004−2012	Italy	11	(0)
- Correct as of 1 February 2020

Fabio Staibano (born 20 April 1983) is an Italian rugby union footballer. He plays as a prop.

Staibano was born in Eboli. He played at a youth level at Battipaglia Rugby, moving to Overmach Rugby Parma F.C., aged 18, where he would stay from 2001/02 to 2007/08. Staibano represented the French team of Castres Olympique for the 2008/09 and 2009/10 seasons. Fabio joined Aironi for the 2010/2011 season.

Staibano has 11 caps for Italy, having yet to score his first points. The Italian prop's first cap came at 11 June 2006, in a 52-6 win over Japan, in Tokyo. He played two games during the 2007 Six Nations Championship. He had been called as Carlo Del Fava replacement for the 2007 Rugby World Cup finals, but he was ruled out too, due an injury. Del Fava was ruled fit soon and took his place. Staibano was originally called up for the 2009 Six Nations Championship but he was left out of the final team.
