= Student rugby union =

College rugby sport

Student rugby is a collegiate version of rugby union. It is played throughout universities and institutes on the island of Ireland, as well as throughout Britain.

Unlike most Irish university sports, collegiate club rugby is not administered by the National Collegiate Athletic Association or university athletic departments and is instead regulated by IRFU and club rec departments. Although full 15-a-side rugby union is clearly stressed in the leagues, the sevens variants can be routinely seen. Student rugby represents this first level competitiveness in the relatively small Irish system.

== Overview ==
The colleges division systems are structured in 2 separate divisions, these are further split up into 4 smaller divisions, so that travelling for each team is kept to a minimum, e.g. Division 2 (North), Division 2 (East). The top two teams from each of these sub-divisions qualify for an all-Ireland cup to be promoted to Division 1 for the following season, the most recent of these was UUJ.

Division 2 (North) is also the only cross-border league in the competition, with colleges from both the Republic of Ireland and Northern Ireland.

== College rugby pages ==
- UU Rugby
- Student Rugby
