= Andrea Lo Cicero =

Italy international rugby union player

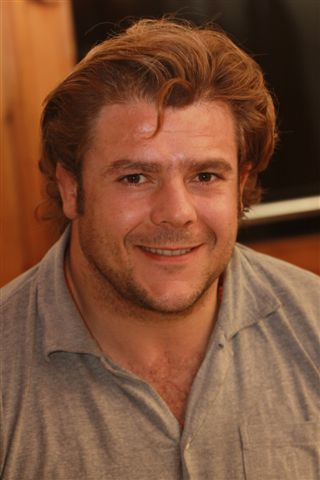
- Born: Andrea Lo Cicero Vaina; 7 May 1976 (age 50) Catania, Sicily, Italy
- Height: 1.85 m (6 ft 1 in)
- Weight: 117 kg (258 lb)

Rugby union career
- Position: Prop
Amateur team(s)
Years	Team	Apps	(Points)
1993-1995	Catania		
Senior career
Years	Team	Apps	(Points)
1995-1997	Catania	38	(5)
1997–98	Bologna	19	(0)
1998–99	Rovigo	12	(0)
1999–2001	Rugby Roma	34	(50)
2001–03	Toulouse	16	(0)
2004–07	L'Aquila	40	(15)
2007–13	Racing Métro	123	(35)
- Correct as of 10 February 2013
International career
Years	Team	Apps	(Points)
2000–13	Italy	103	(40)
- Correct as of 17 March 2013

Andrea Lo Cicero Vaina (Italian pronunciation: [anˈdrɛːa lo ˈtʃiːtʃero]; born Catania, 7 May 1976) is an Italian rugby union footballer, who retired from playing in 2013.

Born in Catania, Sicily, Lo Cicero began his professional career in the town of his birth with Amatori Catania. Later he moved to Bologna and then to Rugby Rovigo, winning his first Italian Championship in 2000 with Rugby Roma. Subsequently, he played for a season in the French team Stade Toulousain. He then played for L'Aquila and he completed his career playing for Racing Métro 92 in France's Top 14.

Lo Cicero was included in Italy's squad for the 1999 Rugby World Cup but did not see any action and had to wait until the following year to make his international debut. It came against England in 2000 when he had the difficult task of filling the gap left by the Azzurri prop and captain Massimo Cuttitta.

He was named in the BBC's dream XV at the 2004 Six Nations Championship and was part of the Barbarians squad to take on New Zealand later that year. Lo Cicero was the only European player to receive a call, and he capped the feat by scoring a try. In 2005 he again represented the Barbarians for their matches against Scotland and England.

In the 2007 Six Nations Championship, he celebrated his 50th appearance in the Six Nations with a thumping 37–17 victory over Scotland at Murrayfield, Italy's first away victory in the tournament.

Lo Cicero won his 100th cap for Italy against Scotland in the 2013 Six Nations tournament and his 101st in the match against Wales, equalling Alessandro Troncon's record as Italy's most-capped player, breaking that record against England. Lo Cicero announced he was retiring from the Italian national team after their final game of the 2013 Six Nations against Ireland, and came on to massive cheers from Italian fans. Italy went on to win the game 22–15, thus recording their first Six Nations victory over Ireland.

He was also selected for the 2013 Barbarians squad to play in Hong Kong against the British and Irish Lions and England.
