= Ezio Galon =

Italy international rugby union player

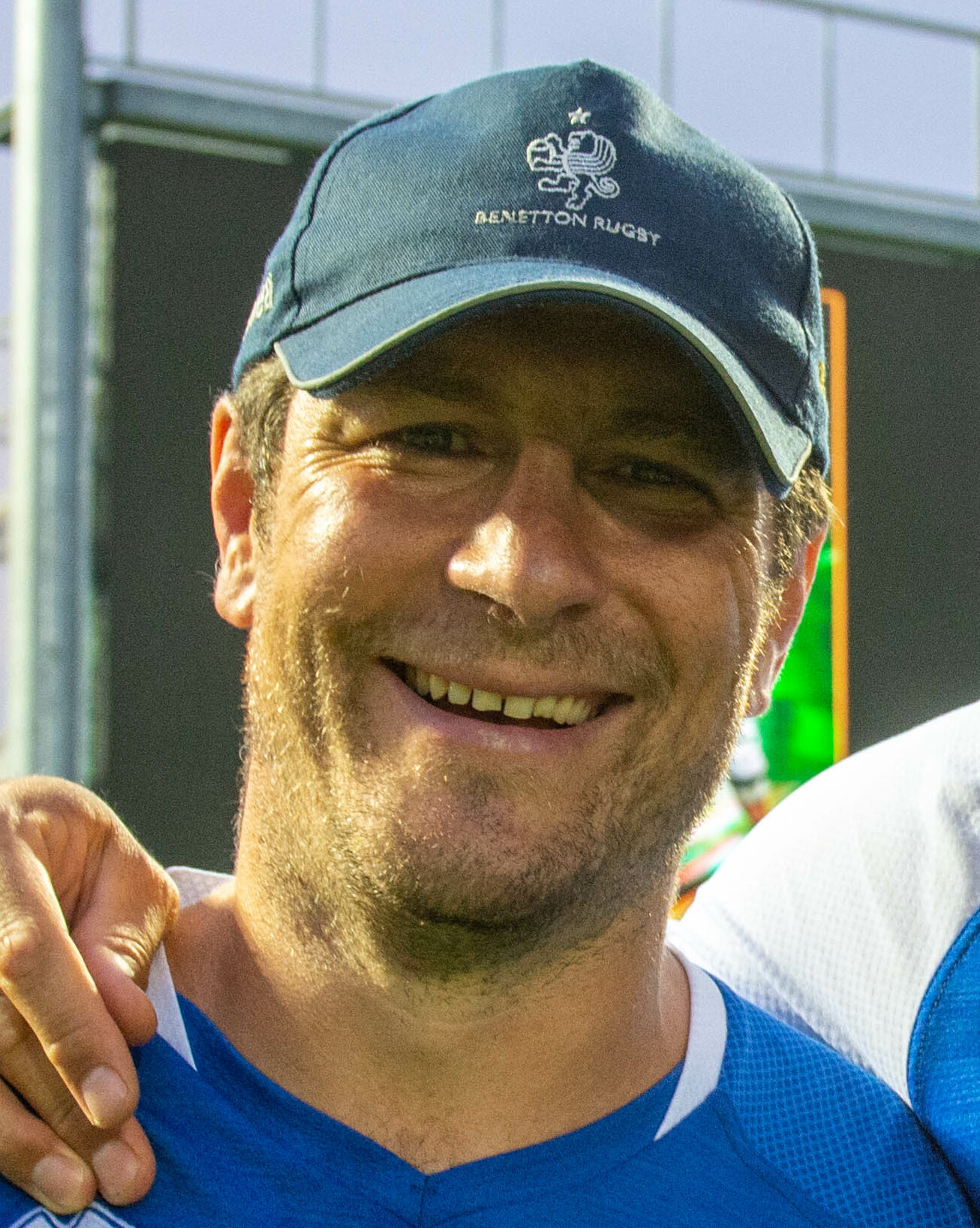
- Born: Ezio Galon; 22 July 1977 (age 49) Treviso, Italy
- Height: 1.85 m (6 ft 1 in)
- Weight: 91 kg (201 lb)

Rugby union career
- Position: Full-back / Wing / Centre
- Current team: Benetton Treviso
Senior career
Years	Team	Apps	(Points)
1996-1997	Bologna	18	(15)
1997-1998	San Donà	16	(37)
1998-2001	Bourgoin-Jallieu	28	(25)
2001-2004	La Rochelle	55	(59)
2004-2005	Lyon OU	27	(20)
2005-2008	Parma	46	(83)
2008-2012	Benetton Treviso	65	(57)
2012-2014	Mogliano	47	(60)
2012	→Benetton Treviso	1	(0)
International career
Years	Team	Apps	(Points)
2001-2008	Italy	19	(5)
- Correct as of 28 March 2016
Coaching career
- Years: Team
- 2015−2016: Mogliano (Head coach)
- 2016−: Benetton Treviso (assistant coach)

Ezio Galon (born 22 July 1977) is a former Italian rugby union player.

He played for Mogliano Rugby in the Excellence competition. A native of Treviso, he formerly played for Rugby Parma and, in 2000-2005, in the French sides of Bourgoin-Jallieu (2000–2001), La Rochelle (2001–2004, with whom he won two French Cups) and Lyon OU (2004–2005).

Ezio Galon's position of choice is as a full-back, but he is comfortable operating as a centre or on the wing.

He played for Italy in the 2006, 2007 and 2008 tournaments. He was called for the 2007 Rugby World Cup.

After being the Assistant and Head Coach for Mogliano Rugby, he became Assistant Coach for Benetton Treviso for the 2016-17 season.
