= Cameron Mather =

Scotland international rugby union player

- Born: Cameron George Mather; 20 August 1973 (age 53) Christchurch, New Zealand
- Height: 198 cm (6 ft 6 in)
- Weight: 110 kg (17 st 5 lb; 243 lb)

Rugby union career
- Position: Back Row
Amateur team(s)
Years	Team	Apps	(Points)
	East Coast Bays	152	
–	Watsonians		
Senior career
Years	Team	Apps	(Points)
	Edinburgh Rugby	126	
–	Leeds Tykes		
–	Glasgow Warriors		
Provincial / State sides
Years	Team	Apps	(Points)
- North Harbour
International career
Years	Team	Apps	(Points)
1999-2004	Scotland	12	(10)
–	Barbarians		

Cameron George Mather (born 20 August 1973 in Christchurch, New Zealand) is a rugby union footballer who plays in the back row. He won eleven caps for Scotland between 1999 and 2004.

== Notes ==
Cameron George Mather - Was born in Christchurch New Zealand, He was Educated at St Kentigern School and Auckland Grammar School before joining the University Club in Auckland upon leaving school. He had represented the Auckland Province at age level, but in 1993 chose to join the East Coast Bays Club in North Harbour. He was selected for the North Harbour representative Colts side and was an ever present member of the championship winning side. His successful season lead to his selection for the New Zealand colts trials, although not selected for the national side. In 1994 following another successful club and provincial season with further 7's and XV's honours Mather left New Zealand to join the Watsonians football club in Edinburgh.

He went on to play over 100 games for the Edinburgh club side helping them land their first Melrose 7's title for over 60 years in 1996 and lead them to their first Premiership title in 1998 before returning as player coach in 2006 and delivering the Scottish Cup at the first time of asking.

In 1996 Mather signed a professional contract with the Scottish Rugby Union and was placed with the Edinburgh Side. Mather qualified for Scotland through his Paternal Grandfather, George Scott Urquhart – who was honoured for gallantry as a young sailor in the Great War and is buried in the grounds of Stirling Castle. In 1998 the Edinburgh side was merged with the Border Reivers to form the Edinburgh Reivers. Mather toured South Africa and Zimbabwe with the Scottish side in 1997 having won international A caps and sevens honours in Dubai and the 7's world cup in Hong Kong earlier that season. He toured Australia in 1998 playing in 4 of the 8 touring matches scoring tries against Victoria and Queensland. He again toured South Africa in 1999 and was subsequently selected for the 1999 rugby world cup squad, winning his first cap in August 99 against Romania at Hampden Park in Glasgow. Further caps followed against Spain, Western Samoa and a quarter final against New Zealand at Murrayfield. Further 6 nations involvement followed with his championship debut against France in March 2000. At the beginning of the 2000/01 Season Mather Joined National Division one side Leeds Tykes helping them win promotion to the premiership and scoring the club's first ever premiership try in their opening day defeat of Bath at Headingley in August 2001. He would go on to score a further 5 in his first premiership season. Mather was an ever present in the Tykes side and a standout player in the Premiership, winning the player of the year and players player of the year award in 2003 having helped the Leeds outfit to its highest ever league position of 5th.

At the end of the 2002/03 season Mather returned to Scotland to Captain the Glasgow Warriors side. His form secured him a late replacement call for the 2003 World Cup Squad and he was one of the few standout Scottish performers in what was a disappointing tournament for the Scots. He gained further caps against France, Fiji and another quarter final appearance against hosts Australia in Brisbane. He was cornerstone of the new look Scotland side under the guidance of Australian Mat Williams, but injury against England and France faltered any consistency in his play. He returned to full fitness in the narrow defeat by the Barbarians at Murrayfield in May 2004 to subsequently break his ankle 5 days later against Queensland in Brisbane in the first Australian tour match. That was to be Mather's final appearance for Scotland as he chose to retire from the international game in the lead up to the 2005 Six nations sighting lack of Motivation and despondency with injury. He would play the remaindered of the season with Glasgow before returning to Edinburgh as Director of Rugby at Watsonians while assisting his former Glasgow Warriors side as a Lineout analyst.

Mather retired from Rugby in 2007 and moved into a Marketing role with brewer Heineken UK in October of that year.

In 2014 Mather returned to his native New Zealand. He became involved in top-level coaching again in 2017, taking over the reins as Head Coach in one of New Zealand's oldest and most famous clubs - Auckland University. The Students, having been relegated to the 2nd tier for the first time in its history the previous year, Mather helped guide the side to the Gallaher Shield Final. Defeating defending champions Suburbs in the decider at Eden Park to win the Auckland club Title. Mather was awarded Auckland Rugby Coach of the year at the provinces end of seasons awards.
