= Yannick Bru =

French rugby union coach and former player (born 1973)

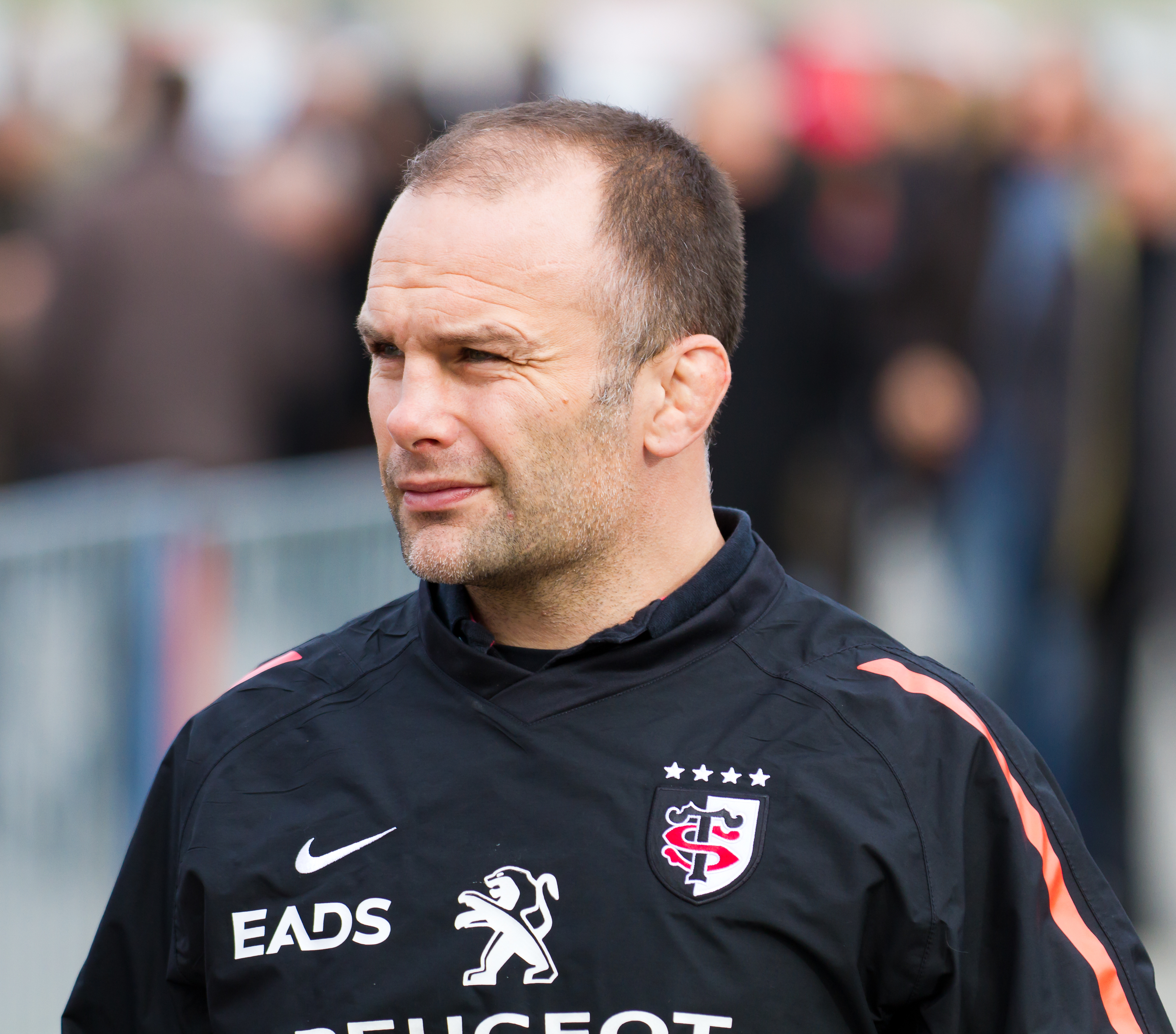
- Born: 22 May 1973 (age 53) Auch, France
- Height: 5 ft 11 in (180 cm)
- Weight: 15 st 6 lb (216 lb; 98 kg)

Rugby union career
- Position: Hooker
Senior career
Years	Team	Apps	(Points)
1995–1996	Auch		
1996–1997	Toulouse		
1997–1998	Colomiers		
1998–2007	Toulouse	197	(35)
International career
Years	Team	Apps	(Points)
2001–2004	France	18	(5)
Coaching career
- Years: Team
- 2007–2012: Toulouse (forwards)
- 2012–2017: France (forwards)
- 2018–2022: Bayonne
- 2022–2023: Sharks (breakdown)
- 2023–: Bordeaux Bègles

Yannick Bru (French pronunciation: [janik bʁy]; born 22 May 1973) is a French rugby union coach and former player who played as a hooker. He is the head coach of Union Bordeaux Bègles in the Top 14. Bru was capped 18 times for the France national team.

At Toulouse, Bru twice won the Heineken Cup, in 2003 when he started, and 2005 as a replacement, as well as winning the Top 14 title in 1999 and 2001. Bru has also been capped 18 times for France, including their grand slams in the 2002 and 2004 Six Nations Championships, as well as being a part of their 2003 Rugby World Cup squad.

Bru will left Toulouse at the end of the 2011–12 season to join the staff of the French national team as forwards coach.
