= Fabio Ongaro =

Italy international rugby union player

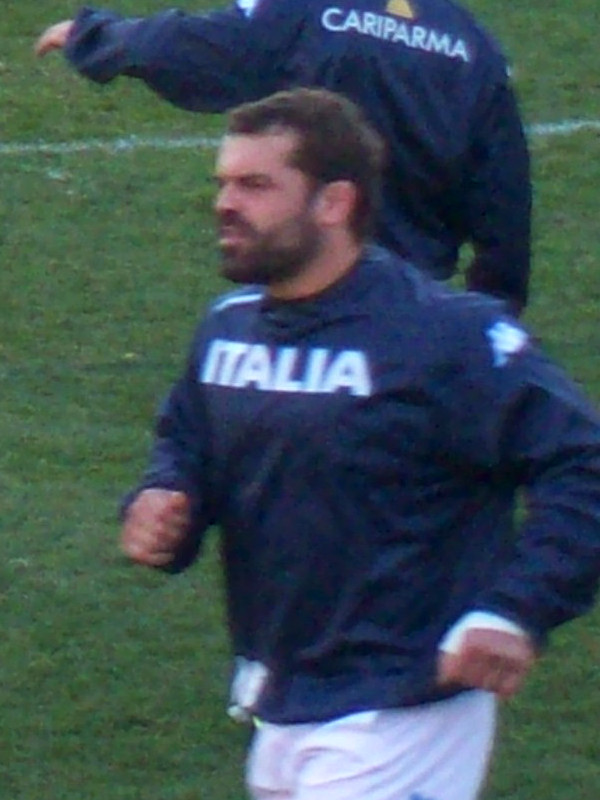
- Born: 23 September 1977 (age 49) Mestre
- Height: 6 ft 0 in (1.83 m)
- Weight: 229 lb (104 kg)

Rugby union career
- Position: Hooker
Amateur team(s)
Years	Team	Apps	(Points)
1988–1995	Casale		
Senior career
Years	Team	Apps	(Points)
1995–1998	Casale	32	(15)
1998–2006	Benetton Treviso	118	(60)
2006–2010	Saracens	40	(5)
2010–2012	Aironi	34	(0)
International career
Years	Team	Apps	(Points)
2000–2012	Italy	80	(25)
- Correct as of 20 November 2011
Coaching career
- Years: Team
- 2012−2014: Zebre(team manager)
- 2016−2025: Benetton (assistant coach)

Fabio Ongaro (born 23 September 1977 in Venice) is an Italian rugby union footballer. Although he now plays as a hooker, he played in the Italian youth teams as a flanker.

== Career ==
Ongaro first played for Rugby Casale (1994/95-1997/98), spending the most prolific time of his career at Benetton Treviso (1998/99-2005/06), where he won 5 Italian Championships (1998/99, 2000/01, 2002/03, 2003/04 and 2005/06), a Cup of Italy (2004/05) and a Supercup (2006). He moved to Saracens, in England, where he played from 2006/07 to 2009/10. He has played for Aironi since 2010/11.

Ongaro won his first cap in 2000 when the Azzurri played against Canada in Rovigo, in a 17–22 loss. Ongaro played every match for Italy in the 2003 World Cup. He scored the crucial try that helped beat Scotland 20–14 in Rome in the 2004 Six Nations Championship. His rise to the top peaked in November 2004 when he was named as Italy captain in place of the injured Marco Bortolami. He played 2 matches at the 2007 Rugby World Cup. He has been a regular player at the Six Nations since 2003. He played his last international match for Italy against Scotland on 17 March 2012.

== Coaching career ==
Ongaro became Assistant Coach at Benetton Treviso from the start of the 2016/17 season and until 2024/25 season.

== Doping allegations ==
In 2003 Ongaro, alongside fellow international Gianluca Faliva, had been accused of having made use of Epoetin beta (NeoRecormon) for doping purposes. In 2009 the trial was concluded with a sentence of absolution for Faliva and Ongaro, as no proof of either of them using or detaining the doping substance could be presented.
