= Robin McBryde =

British Lions & Wales international rugby union footballer

Robin McBride
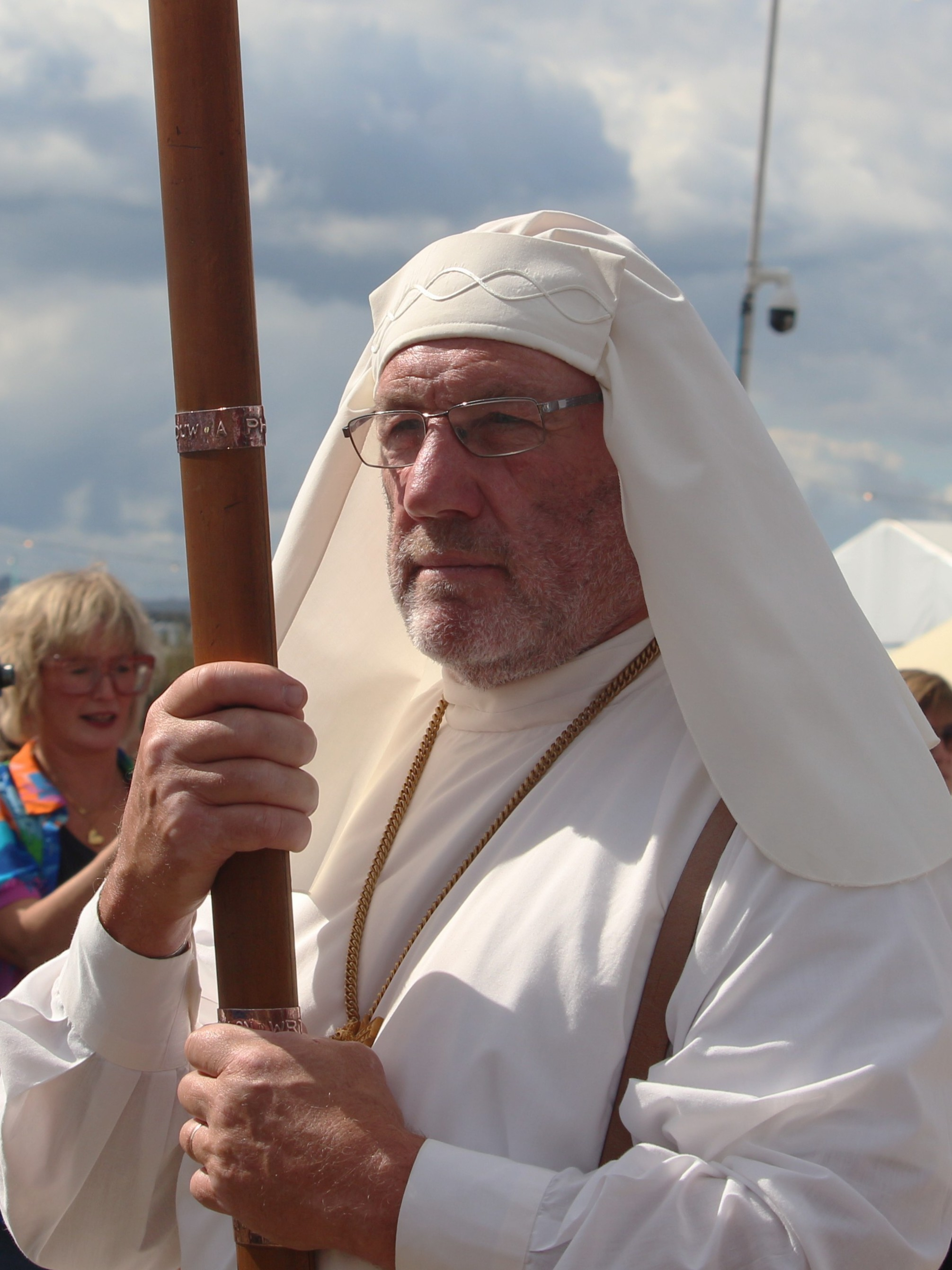
- McBryde in his role as the Sword-bearer in the National Eisteddfod, 2026
- Born: Robin Currie McBryde; 3 July 1970 (age 56) Bangor, Wales
- Height: 183 cm (6 ft 0 in)
- Weight: 108 kg (17 st 0 lb)

Rugby union career
- Position: Hooker
Senior career
Years	Team	Apps	(Points)
–	Bangor RFC		
–	Menai Bridge RFC		
–	Mold RFC		
1990-1995	Swansea RFC	64	(29)
1994-2005	Llanelli RFC/Scarlets	250	(90)
International career
Years	Team	Apps	(Points)
1994–2005	Wales	37	(5)
2001	British & Irish Lions	4	(0)
Coaching career
- Years: Team
- 2004–2008: Scarlets
- 2008-2019: Wales
- 2019-present: Leinster Rugby
- 2021: British & Irish Lions

Robin Currie McBryde (born 3 July 1970) is a Welsh rugby union former player and coach. He gained 37 caps for Wales. He played hooker.

== Background ==
McBryde was born in north Wales.

He is a fluent Welsh speaker.

McBryde worked as an overhead linesman before becoming a professional rugby player.

== Rugby playing career ==
McBryde first played club rugby for Bangor RFC, Porthaethwy and for the North Wales team. He then moved to South Wales in search of a higher standard of rugby. He joined Swansea then moved to Llanelli, making his first appearance for the club on 1 October 1994 against Cardiff. He captained Llanelli when they won the Welsh Cup in 1998 and the Welsh Championship in 1999 and later played for the Llanelli Scarlets regional side when they were formed in 2003. He played 250 games for Llanelli and the Scarlets between 1994 and 2005 scoring 19 tries.

He won his first cap for Wales against Fiji in 1994. His last international appearance was as a replacement in the match against Ireland in March 2005 which saw Wales clinch the Grand Slam.

He was selected for the 2001 British Lions tour to Australia, appearing against Western Australia, Queensland Presidents XV, Australia A and New South Wales, before he was unfortunately forced out of the tour by injury and replaced by Dorian West.

In August 2005 he announced his retirement from rugby following surgery to remove a disc from the top of his spine.

== Rugby coaching career ==
After retiring from playing, McBryde was appointed coach of the Scarlets Regional Under 18 team.

He was subsequently appointed forwards coach for the Welsh national team. In June 2009 he was caretaker head coach of the Wales national team for the two match North American tour during Warren Gatland's absence as assistant coach to the British & Irish Lions. Wales won both matches against Canada and USA. He was to be caretaker head coach for interim head coach Rob Howley who was filling in for Warren Gatland.

It was announced that he would join Leinster rugby as an Assistant coach after the 2019 Rugby World Cup.

== Other notable roles and work ==
McBryde won the "Wales' strongest man" competition in 1992.

In 2007, McBryde took over the role of Grand Sword Bearer (initially temporarily) at the National Eisteddfod of Wales, for the Gorsedd of bards, after Ray Gravell (the previous bearer) had his leg amputated. Gravell died in October 2007 and McBryde was confirmed in the role at the Gorsedd's 2008 annual meeting. McBryde uses the bardic name of 'Robin o Fôn'.
