= Carlo Del Fava =

- Born: Carlo Antonio Del Fava; 1 July 1981 (age 45) Mthatha, South Africa
- Height: 1.98 m (6 ft 6 in)
- Weight: 110 kg (17 st 5 lb; 243 lb)
- School: Queen's College

Rugby union career
- Position: Lock
Senior career
| Years | Team | Apps | (Points) |
| 2004–2005 | Parma | 9 | (0) |
| 2005–2007 | Bourgoin | 44 | (0) |
| 2007–2009 | Ulster | 26 | (5) |
| 2009–2010 | Viadana | 19 | (0) |
| 2010–2012 | Aironi | 21 | (0) |
| 2012–2014 | Newcastle Falcons | 28 | (0) |
- Correct as of 31 May 2014
Provincial / State sides
| Years | Team | Apps | (Points) |
| 2001 | Natal Wildebeest | | |
| 2002 | Sharks | | |
International career
| Years | Team | Apps | (Points) |
| 2001 | South Africa U21 | | |
| 2004–2011 | Italy | 52 | (5) |
- Correct as of 30 September 2011

Carlo Antonio Del Fava (born 1 July 1981) is a former rugby union player. His preferred position was Lock. After hanging his boots up he then decided to take up coaching. Born in South Africa, he played for Italy internationally.

== Rugby career ==
Del Fava made his Italy debut in the 2004 Six Nations Championship. Previously he played for the South African under-21 team.

While playing rugby in South Africa, Del Fava served a two-year ban after testing positive for the banned substance stanozolol.

He was called up to the Italy squad for the 2008 Six Nations Championship.

On 10 February 2014, it was announced Del Fava had been forced to retire due to a long-standing neck injury.

== Media work ==
Del Fava was part of the BBC Sport coverage for the 2014, 2015 and 2016 Six Nations, giving his views on the Italian side.

== Personal life ==
Del Fava was born in Mthatha, South Africa to Italian parents. His great-grandfather emigrated to South Africa from Lucca.

== See also ==
- Italian South Africans
