= Simon Webster (rugby union) =

Scotland international rugby union player

- Born: Simon Webster; 8 March 1981 (age 45) Hartlepool, England
- Height: 6 ft 0 in (1.84 m)
- Weight: 14 st 0 lb (89 kg)

Rugby union career
- Position: WingCentre
Senior career
Years	Team	Apps	(Points)
2000–2001	Northampton Saints		
2002–2012	Edinburgh	127	(170)
International career
Years	Team	Apps	(Points)
2003–2009	Scotland	37	(40)

Simon Webster is a former rugby union player that played for Edinburgh and Scotland on the wing and centre. He was quick and creative player known for his pace and committed approach to the game. Starting on the wing in later years he was noticed to have bulked up considerably and moved into the centre playing in the number 13 jersey.

== Club career ==
Webster attended Yarm School in Stockton-on-Tees where he captained the schools first XV side. Webster turned professional in 2000 and went on to make his debut for Northampton Saints against Newcastle Falcons. In 2001 he was in the Barbarians team who won the Melrose Sevens, and the following year he signed for Edinburgh Rugby.

Webster held a long career at Edinburgh playing at the club for nearly 10 years, taking part in over 100 games for the club, under various coaches including national coaches Frank Hadden and Andy Robinson. His last few years were plagued by injury, especially the last two seasons with an Achilles problem. Webster returned to full fitness in September but has been unable to dislodge prolific Tim Visser and Scotland international Lee Jones. In March 2012 he left the club by mutual consent in search of more regular playing time.

== International career ==
Webster qualified for Scotland through his grandparents, who hail from Greenock. In addition to playing for Scotland he has played for Scotland A, and the Scotland under-19 and under-21 squads.

Simon Webster made his Scotland debut against Ireland in a World Cup warm-up match in 2003, and although he didn't make into the squad for the tournament he became a regular during the 2004 Six Nations.

A versatile back, Webster has played both on the wing and in the centre for Scotland during his career. He finally made an impact on the World Cup in 2007, becoming the only Scotland player to start all five of their tournament matches as they were knocked out at the quarter final stages.

Webster crossed for a try against Ireland in the second game of the 2008 Six Nations, reverting to the centre after beginning the tournament against France on the wing. He then played in both games of Scotland's two-Test series in Argentina, including their victory in Buenos Aires. He only made a single appearance during the 2008 autumn internationals, against Canada at Pittodrie, but in January 2009 he was included in Frank Hadden's squad for the Six Nations.

== Other information ==
Webster also sells rugby gear, including the orange gloves that a large number of the Scottish backs wear.
