= Guy Easterby =

Ireland international rugby union player

- Born: 21 March 1971 (age 55) Tadcaster, West Riding of Yorkshire
- Height: 1.83 m (6 ft 0 in)
- Weight: 94 kg (14 st 11 lb)
- School: Ampleforth College
- Notable relative: Simon Easterby (brother)

Rugby union career
- Position: Scrum-half
Senior career
Years	Team	Apps	(Points)
1996-1999	Rotherham		
1999-2000	London Scottish		
2000–2003	Ebbw Vale		
2004–2007	Blackrock College		
Provincial / State sides
Years	Team	Apps	(Points)
2003–2006	Scarlets	1	(0)
2000–2003, 2006-2008	Leinster	55	(25)
- Correct as of 2007-12-15
International career
Years	Team	Apps	(Points)
2000–2005	Ireland	28	(30)
Coaching career
- Years: Team
- 2010-present: Leinster

Guy Easterby (born 21 March 1971) is a former rugby union player for Ireland. He is currently head of rugby operations of Leinster.

His father is English and his mother is Irish. He is the brother of Simon Easterby, also an Ireland international and the most capped back-rower to come from Yorkshire.

Easterby made his senior Ireland debut against the United States on 10 June 2000 and marked the occasion by scoring two tries in a record 83–3 victory. Easterby made his test debut in the same year as Peter Stringer but always trailed the Munster scrum-half in the Irish pecking order. 21 out of his 27 appearances before the 2005 Six Nations Championship were made as a substitute. He enjoyed a stint with London Scottish after enjoying his most successful part of his career with Rotherham in the English Premiership and with Leinster in Ireland. He retired after the 2006–07 season, though he made a comeback against Edinburgh Rugby on 15 December 2007
