= Pépito Elhorga =

France international rugby union player

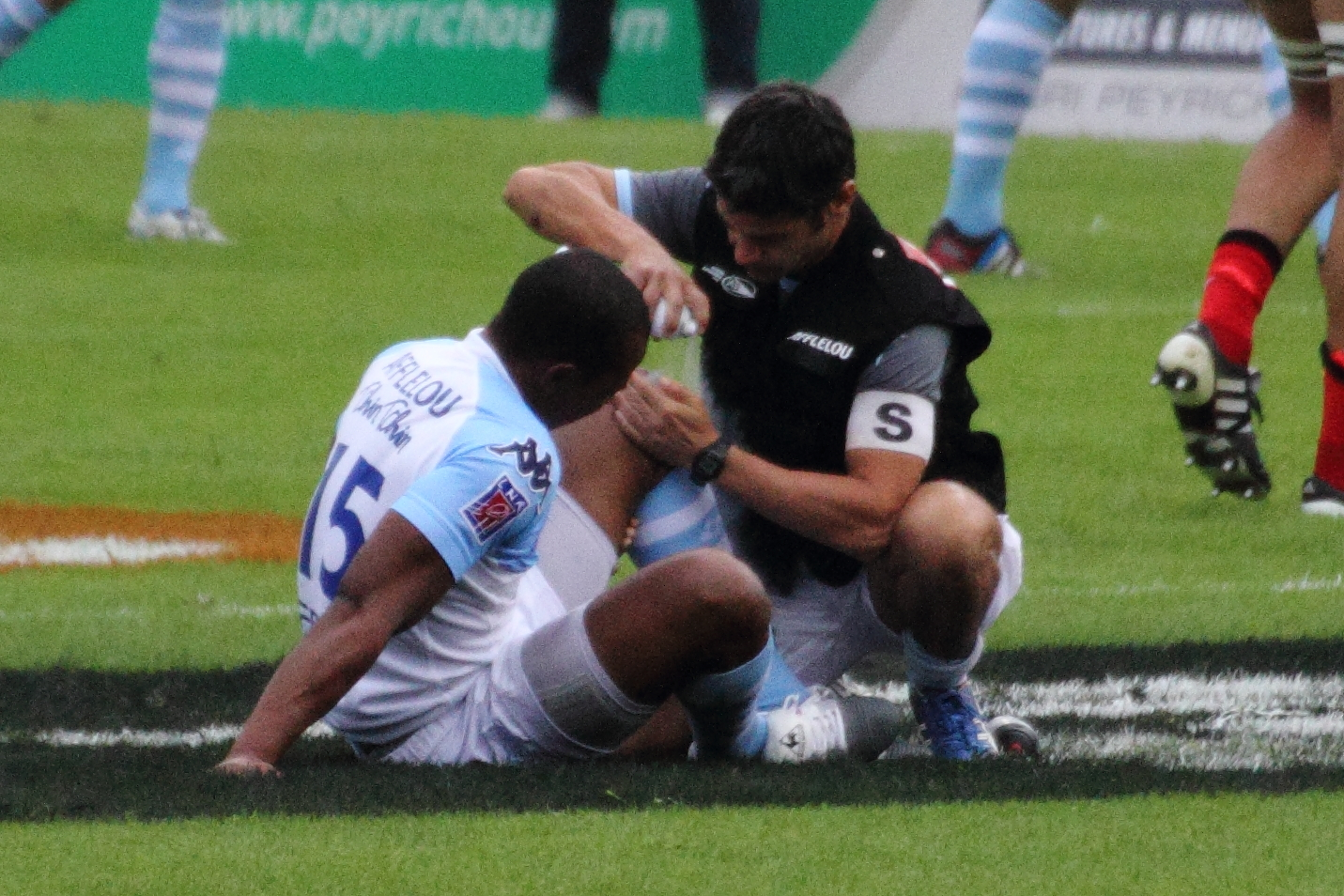
- Born: January 6, 1978 (age 48) Agboville, Côte d'Ivoire
- Height: 1.78 m (5 ft 10 in)
- Weight: 187 lb (85 kg)

Rugby union career
- Position: Full-back
Amateur team(s)
Years	Team	Apps	(Points)
- Saint-Jean-de-Luz OR
Senior career
Years	Team	Apps	(Points)
1996–1999	Biarritz		
2001–2007	Agen	122	(162)
2007–2012	Bayonne	75	(38)
2013–2014	Anglet ORC		
International career
Years	Team	Apps	(Points)
2001–2008	France	18	(15)

Pépito Elhorga (born 6 January 1978) is a former French rugby player. He played for Aviron Bayonnais in the Top 14 club competition, and previously played for Biarritz Olympique and SU Agen.

He was a member of France's 2003 Rugby World Cup squad. He had 18 caps, from 2001 to 2008, and scored 3 tries (15 points).
