= Anthony Horgan =

Irish rugby union player

- Born: Anthony Horgan; 15 November 1976 (age 49) Cork, Ireland
- Height: 1.8 m (5 ft 11 in)
- Weight: 96 kg (15 st 2 lb)

Rugby union career
- Position: Wing
Amateur team(s)
Years	Team	Apps	(Points)
1995-2011	Cork Constitution		
Senior career
Years	Team	Apps	(Points)
1997–2009	Munster	146	(205)
- Correct as of 30 September 2011
International career
Years	Team	Apps	(Points)
2000-05	Ireland A	9	(35)
2003-05	Ireland	7	(5)
- Correct as of 30 September 2011

Anthony Horgan (born 15 November 1976 in Cork, Ireland) is a former Irish rugby union player, who played for Cork Constitution, Munster and Ireland. He played the majority of his rugby as a Winger.

Upon leaving school in 1995, he joined Cork Constitution, playing his last game for the club in 2011. His professional career kicked off in 1997 when he was drafted into the Munster squad under then-new coach Declan Kidney.

== Munster ==
Horgan made his Munster debut against Connacht in August 1997. He started for Munster in their first Heineken Cup final against Northampton Saints in May 2000.Horgan was also selected to start the 2002 Heineken Cup final loss against Leicester but broke his hand the night before in a captains run. Due to his withdrawal John O'Neill started in his place He was part of the Munster team that beat Neath to win the 2002–03 Celtic League, and he picked up more silverware when Munster beat Scarlets to win the Celtic Cup in May 2005. Horgan started for Munster as they beat Biarritz 23-19 to win their first Heineken Cup final in May 2006.

He played his last game for Munster on 15 May 2009 in 36-10 Celtic League win over the Ospreys at Thomond Park, where the team also received the trophy as 2008–09 Celtic League winners. Horgan scored Munster's final try, to the delight of the home crowd.

Horgan was Munster's all-time leading try scorer, with 41 tries to his name when he retired in May 2009, until Simon Zebo broke that record in March 2016.

== Ireland ==
Horgan made his debut for Ireland against Samoa in June 2003. His first and only try for Ireland came against Scotland in September 2003. Horgan was selected in Ireland's squad for the 2003 Rugby World Cup, but he did not feature in the tournament. His last appearance for Ireland was against New Zealand in November 2005.
