= Ben Hinshelwood =

Scotland international rugby union player

- Born: Ben Gerald Hinshelwood; 22 March 1977 (age 49) Melbourne, Australia
- Height: 1.91 m (6 ft 3 in)
- Weight: 100 kg (220 lb)
- School: North Sydney Boys High School
- University: University of Sydney
- Notable relative: Sandy Hinshelwood

Rugby union career
- Position: Full-back
Senior career
| Years | Team | Apps | (Points) |
| 2000–2001 | Bedford Blues | | |
| 2001–2006 | Worcester Warriors | | |
International career
| Years | Team | Apps | (Points) |
| 2002–2005 | Scotland | 19 | (5) |

Benjamin Gerald Hinshelwood (born 22 March 1977 in Melbourne) is a Scottish international rugby union player. He is the son of wing Sandy Hinshelwood. He attended North Sydney Boys High School. He joined the University of Sydney rugby union team where as a centre, and helped secure the 2001 Premiership before leaving for England where he played at full-back for the Worcester Warriors.

Hinshelwood won 19 caps for Scotland, making his debut against Canada in 2002 and a final Test appearance from the bench in last season's Six Nations fixture against Italy. He played in the 2003 Rugby World Cup, making four appearances before Scotland's exit in the quarter-final stage to Australia.

He retired in December 2005 following a back injury. Two months previously he had announced that he was taking a break from international rugby but, after further medical advice called time on his career completely.
