= Santiago Dellapè =

Italy international rugby union player

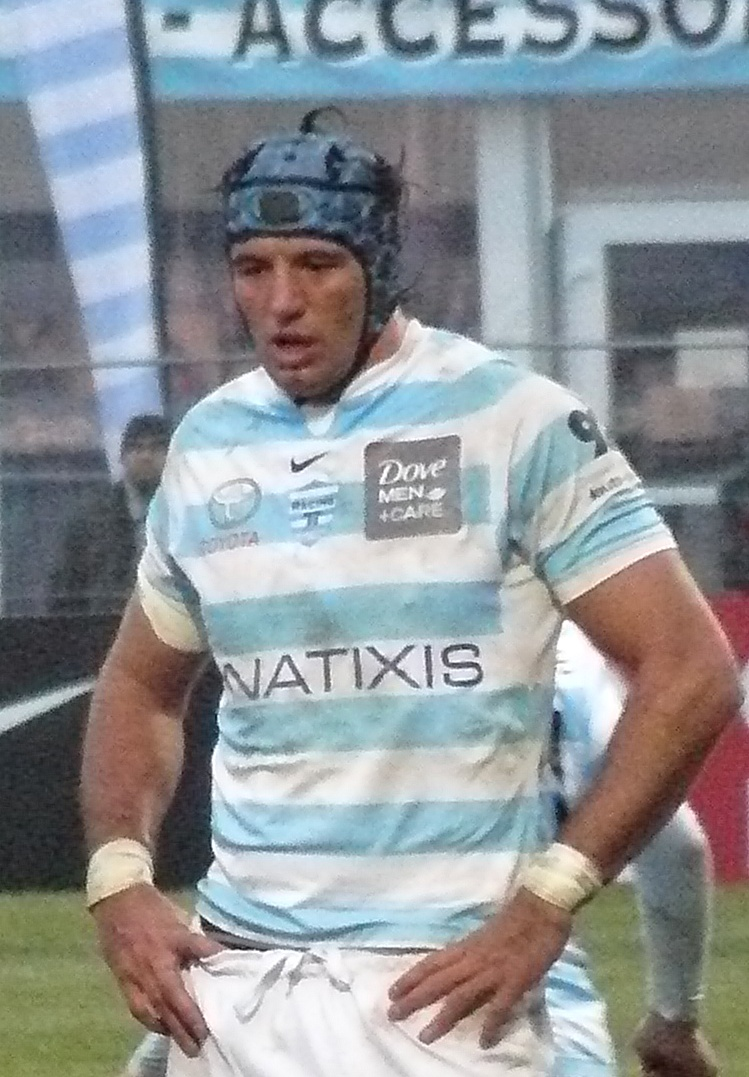
- Born: Santiago Dellapè; 9 May 1978 (age 48) La Plata, Argentina
- Height: 2.01 m (6 ft 7 in)
- Weight: 118 kg (18.6 st)

Rugby union career
- Position: Lock
- Current team: Racing Métro
Senior career
Years	Team	Apps	(Points)
–2001	L'Aquila		
2001–04	Treviso		
2004–06	Agen		
2006–08	Biarritz		
2008–09	Toulon		
2009–	Racing Métro		
International career
Years	Team	Apps	(Points)
2002–	Italy	64	(15)
- Correct as of 29 November 2011

Santiago Dellapè (born 9 May 1978) is an Italian Argentine rugby union footballer. His usual position is at lock. He plays for Italy, and was included their 2003 Rugby World Cup squad to Australia. He has played for the French Top 14 side Racing Métro since the 2009–10 season, having moved to the Parisian club from fellow Top 14 side Toulon.

Born in La Plata, Argentina, Dellapè played rugby there until he joined L'Aquila in Italy in 2001. He soon moved to Benetton Treviso, and was a part of the team that won the 2003–04 Super 10 title. Dellapè made his debut for Italy during the 2002 Six Nations Championship match against France, and since the 2002 series, has become a regular in the Italian side.

== Personal life ==
Dellapè is of Italian descent through a great-grandfather from Cosenza.
