= Carlo Festuccia =

Italian rugby union footballer

- Born: Carlo Festuccia; 20 June 1980 (age 46) L'Aquila, Italy
- Height: 1.82 m (6 ft 0 in)
- Weight: 92 kg (203 lb; 14 st 7 lb)

Rugby union career
- Position: Hooker
- Current team: Zebre
Senior career
Years	Team	Apps	(Points)
1998–2002	L'Aquila	12	(5)
2002−2007	Gran Rugby	87	(40)
2007−2011	Racing 92	67	(25)
2011	→Aironi		(0)
2011−2012	Crociati Parma	5	(10)
2012−2013	Zebre	19	(5)
2013−2016	Wasps	64	(15)
2016−2017	Zebre	13	(0)
2017	Wasps		(0)
2018−2019	Valorugby Emilia	13	(15)
International career
Years	Team	Apps	(Points)
2003-2012	Italy	54	(10)
- Correct as of 25 January 2016
Coaching career
- Years: Team
- 2018−: Valorugby Emilia (assistant coach)

Carlo Festuccia (born 20 June 1980) is an Italian rugby union footballer. He started playing for L'Aquila Rugby, then moved to Gran Rugby. With both teams he competed in the Super 10 in Italy. His usual position is at hooker.

Festuccia was born in L'Aquila. He has also played for the Italian national team. He made his debut for the national team in a 2003 match against Wales, and was that same year, included in Italy's squad for the 2003 Rugby World Cup in Australia.

In 2007, he moved to France, signing with Top 14 side Racing Métro 92 and playing there for four seasons. Festuccia returned to Italy in 2011 to join the Pro12 side Aironi.

On 2 September 2013 it was announced that Festuccia would leave Zebre to join London Wasps in the Aviva Premiership.

Festuccia returned to Zebre 3 years later ahead of the 2016/17 season. On 23 January 2017, Festuccia resign with Wasps for the rest of 2016–17 season.
