= Reggie Corrigan =

Irish rugby union player

- Born: Reggie Corrigan; 19 November 1970 (age 55) Dublin, Ireland
- Height: 1.88 m (6 ft 2 in)
- Weight: 118 kg (18 st 8 lb; 260 lb)

Rugby union career
- Position: Prop
Senior career
| Years | Team | Apps | (Points) |
- Lansdowne Football Club
| – | Greystones RFC | | |
Provincial / State sides
| Years | Team | Apps | (Points) |
| | Leinster Rugby | 136 | (10 2t) |
- Correct as of 20 February 2014
International career
| Years | Team | Apps | (Points) |
| 1997-2006 | Ireland | 47 | (0) |

Reggie Corrigan (born 19 November 1970) is a former Irish rugby union footballer, playing at loose-head prop-forward. He attended school in Presentation College, Bray.

Corrigan made his international debut against Canada in November 1997. He played for Ireland in the Rugby World Cup finals, in 1999 and 2003. He captained Ireland on two occasions against Tonga and Western Samoa in 2003. He was a member of the Triple Crown winning side in 2004. He won the last of his 47 caps against France in the 2006 Six Nations Championship. Corrigan continued to play club rugby and stayed at Leinster until the end of the 2006–07 season. At time of retirement, he had more appearances (138) for Leinster than any other player. Though that appearance record has since been beaten by players such as Brian O'Driscoll and Gordon D'Arcy.

Reggie now runs a healthy options menu to the students in Presentation College Bray where he went to school. He also is a permanent commentator on Setanta Ireland with rugby analysis. He lives in Greystones with his wife Frieda and their son Nathan. He was appointed scrummaging coach at Leinster for the 2009/10 season.
