= Bruce Douglas (rugby union) =

Scotland international rugby union player

- Born: Bruce Andrew Ferguson Douglas; 10 February 1980 (age 46) Edinburgh, Scotland
- Height: 1.80 m (5 ft 11 in)
- Weight: 119 kg (18 st 10 lb)
- School: George Heriot's, Edinburgh
- University: Edinburgh University

Rugby union career
- Position: Prop
Youth career
- -: Edinburgh Wanderers
- –: Heriot's
Senior career
Years	Team	Apps	(Points)
2001–2002	Harlequins	12	(0)
2002–2007	Borders Reivers	92	(0)
2007–2008	Scarlets	16	(0)
2008–2010	Montpellier	44	(0)
2010–2012	Worcester Warriors	43	(0)
2012–2014	Bristol	26	(0)
2014	→ Newport Gwent Dragons	8	(0)
International career
Years	Team	Apps	(Points)
2002–2006	Scotland	43	(5)

Bruce Andrew Ferguson Douglas (born 10 February 1980) is a former Scottish rugby union rugby player. He played as a prop, and had been signed with French top 14 club Montpellier from July 2008 up until March 2010 when it was confirmed that he was signed with Worcester Warriors. He has represented Scottish Schools, Scottish Districts and Scotland at under-16, under-18, under-19 and under-21 levels.

Douglas began his career at Harlequins, before moving back north to the newly formed Border Reivers in 2002.

Douglas won his first cap for Scotland in the 37–10 win against Romania in November 2002. He played in all three of Scotland's victories in the 2002 tour of North America.

In 2003, Douglas scored his first try for Scotland in the 30–22 victory over Wales. He toured South Africa with Scotland in 2003 and his work-rate earned him recognition on the 2004 tour of Australia.

After the Borders were disbanded in 2007, Douglas was signed by the Llanelli Scarlets as the Welsh region attempted to bolster their front row. After 1 season with the Scarlets Douglas, having made 16 appearances over the course of the season, opted to leave Wales for France. After two seasons for Montpellier, he joined Worcester Warriors on a two-year deal.

At the end of the 2012 season, it was announced that Douglas was going to move to Bristol. In February 2014, Douglas joined Newport Gwent Dragons on a loan deal until end of 2013–14 season.

Douglas went on to be an assistant coach at the Newport Gwent Dragons for 2 years, helping the team to 2 European semi final appearances and is now forwards and defence coach at Heriot's Rugby Club in Edinburgh.
