= Brent Cockbain =

British Lions & Wales international rugby union player

- Born: Brent John Cockbain; 15 November 1974 (age 51) Coffs Harbour, NSW, Australia
- Height: 203 cm (6 ft 8 in)
- Weight: 122 kg (19 st 3 lb; 269 lb)
- School: Innisfail High School
- Notable relative: Matt Cockbain (brother)

Rugby union career
- Position: Lock
Senior career
Years	Team	Apps	(Points)
1999–2000	London Irish	14	(0)
2000–2003	Pontypridd		
2003–2004	Celtic Warriors	10	(5)
2004–2007	Ospreys	53	(5)
2007–2010	Sale	38	(0)
Super Rugby
Years	Team	Apps	(Points)
1997–1999	Queensland Reds	2	(0)
International career
Years	Team	Apps	(Points)
1993	Australia U19		
1995	Australia U21		
2003–2007	Wales	24	(5)
2005	British & Irish Lions	0	(0)

Brent John Cockbain (born 15 November 1974 in New South Wales, Australia) is a former rugby union player who won 24 caps for Wales.

== Club career ==
Although born in Australia, and with his brother Matt Cockbain having played international rugby for Australia, Brent decided to emigrate to the UK. Cockbain played club rugby for London Irish, then came to Wales in 1999 to join Pontypridd RFC. With the advent of regional sides in 2003, he played for the Celtic Warriors, then when the Warriors were shut down signed for the Ospreys in 2004.

In the 2004–05 season he helped the Ospreys win the Celtic League and Wales win the Grand Slam, scoring his first and only international try against Italy.

Cockbain returned from injury to club rugby with the Ospreys, but missed Wales' 2006 Autumn Internationals due to an injury. On 3 December 2007, Cockbain signed for the English Premiership side Sale Sharks on a 2½ year contract.

Cockbain retired from competitive sport in June 2010.

== International career ==
Cockbain represented Australia at Under 19 and Under 21 level, but qualified for Wales under the residency rule and made his debut against Romania at Wrexham on 27 August 2003, a match which Wales won 54–8. This match also saw Mike Ruddock take charge of the side for the first time, albeit only for the one game. He went on to start in four of Wales' matches in the 2003 Rugby World Cup. In the 2004–05 season he helped Wales win the Grand Slam, scoring his first international try against Italy. He was flown out to join the 2005 British & Irish Lions tour to New Zealand as a late replacement after Danny Grewcock had been banned for biting.
