= Salvatore Perugini =

Italy international rugby union player

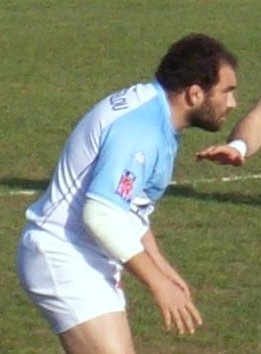
- Born: Salvatore Perugini; 6 March 1978 (age 48) Benevento, Italy
- Height: 5 ft 11 in (1.80 m)
- Weight: 17 st 6 lb (111 kg)

Rugby union career
- Position: Prop
- Current team: Zebre
Senior career
Years	Team	Apps	(Points)
2000−2002	L'Aquila	6	(0)
2002−2006	Calvisano	18	(0)
2006−2009	Stade Toulouse	61	(15)
2009−2010	Bayonne	20	(0)
2010−2012	Aironi	35	(0)
2012−2014	Zebre	38	(0)
2015	L'Aquila	2	(0)
International career
Years	Team	Apps	(Points)
2000–2012	Italy	83	(0)
- Correct as of 20 November 2011

Salvatore Perugini (born 6 March 1978 in Benevento) is a former Italian rugby union player. He made his debut for the Italian national team in 2000 against Ireland. Perugini usually played at prop. He previously played for Italian club Calvisano and French side Stade Toulouse. In April 2010 it was announced he would move to the newly formed Aironi for the 2010/2011 season. Perugini was selected to play for the Barbarians when they beat New Zealand in 2009.
