= Michael Owen (rugby union) =

British Lions & Wales international rugby union player

- Born: 7 November 1980 (age 46) Pontypridd, Wales
- Height: 1.97 m (6 ft 5 1/2 in)
- Weight: 109 kg (17.2 st)
- School: Bryn Celynnog
- University: University of Glamorgan (now the University of South Wales)

Rugby union career
- Position: No.8 / Flanker
Senior career
Years	Team	Apps	(Points)
1999–2003	Pontypridd	103	
2003–2008	Dragons	98	(45)
2008–2010	Saracens	23	(5)
International career
Years	Team	Apps	(Points)
2002–2010	Wales	41	(10)
2005	British & Irish Lions	1	(0)

Michael Owen (born 7 November 1980 in Pontypridd), is a former Welsh international rugby union player, who most often played Number 8, but was also versatile enough to play flanker or even lock. His ball handling was arguably his greatest asset.

== Club career ==
Having been educated at Bryn Celynnog Comprehensive School in Beddau, Owen played for Pontypridd RFC from 1999 until in 2003 the side merged with Bridgend RFC to form the ill-fated Celtic Warriors and then played for the Newport Gwent Dragons in the Celtic League from 2003 until 2008.

Owen joined Guinness Premiership side Saracens for the 2008/2009 season after signing a two-year deal with the club.

== International career ==
Owen became the 1,000th player capped by Wales when he made his debut in the first Test against South Africa in June 2002.

He took over from the injured Gareth Thomas as Wales captain during the 2005 Six Nations, and became the 122nd Captain of his country when he led Wales out against Scotland and led Wales to its first Grand Slam in 27 years.

Owen was selected for the British & Irish Lions for their 2005 New Zealand tour. On 23 May in Cardiff, he had the honour of captaining the side for their match at Millennium Stadium against Argentina. In doing so, he became the first player to captain a Lions Test team on British soil, and outside of the touring country. During the tour, Owen temporarily returned home for the birth of his second child.

=== International tries ===
Try	Opponent	Location	Venue	Competition	Date	Result
1	Scotland	Cardiff, Wales	Millennium Stadium	2003 Rugby World Cup warm-up matches	30 August 2003	Win
2	Fiji	Cardiff, Wales	Millennium Stadium	2005 Autumn Internationals	11 November 2005	Win

== Post professional rugby career ==
In July 2010, Owen announced his retirement from the game at 29 due to a persistent knee problem and embarked on a two-year master's degree course in Business at the University of Hertfordshire.

In March 2010 he began coaching at Hertford RFC, helping them to gain National 2 league status for the 2011/12 season.

Owen was a co-commentator for ITV's coverage of the 2011 Rugby World Cup.

From September 2013 Owen took up the position of Director of Rugby at Haileybury College.
