= Roland de Marigny =

Italian rugby union player (born 1975)

- Born: Roland de Marigny; 17 November 1975 (age 50) Durban, South Africa
- Height: 6 ft (1.8 m)
- Weight: 13.6 st (86 kg)
- School: Westville Boys' High School
- Notable relative: Marc de Marigny (brother)

Rugby union career
- Position(s): Flyhalf, Fullback
Amateur team(s)
Years	Team	Apps	(Points)
- Bangor
- Correct as of 13 July 2014
Senior career
Years	Team	Apps	(Points)
2000–01	Llanelli	2	(0)
2001-05	Overmach Parma		
2005-06	Leeds Tykes		
- Correct as of 13 July 2014
Provincial / State sides
Years	Team	Apps	(Points)
1996-97	Leopards		
1997-98	Blue Bulls		(229)
1998-2000	Sharks (Currie Cup)		
- Correct as of 13 July 2014
Super Rugby
Years	Team	Apps	(Points)
1997	Bulls		
1998-2000	Sharks		
- Correct as of 13 July 2014
International career
Years	Team	Apps	(Points)
2004-	Italy	?	((?))
- Correct as of 13 July 2014

Roland de Marigny (born 17 November 1975) is an Italian rugby union footballer. His normal position is fullback though he can also play centre or fly-half.

== Personal life ==
Marigny was born in Durban, South Africa. His parents originated from Mauritius.

He developed his rugby skills whilst at Westville Boys' High School, a school known for producing rugby talent such as former Springbok Tim Cocks and Shaun Payne.

== Playing career ==
He went on to play in Wales with Bangor and Llanelli and Super 12 with the Blue Bulls and Sharks. He moved to Italy originally to play for Overmach Parma for the 2000–2001 season. Roland joined Leeds Tykes for the 2005–2006 season.

Roland opted to play international rugby union for Italy, qualifying for them after playing there for more than five years in the domestic league. He made his Azzurri debut as a replacement in the 2004 Six Nations against the then newly crowned World Champions England. He followed this up in the following week when he made his first start against France in Paris and was part of the side which beat Scotland in Rome that season. Roland scored Italy's last gasp try that ultimately denied Ireland their first 6 Nations triumph.

His brother Marc de Marigny is a South Africa national rugby union team sevens player and has previously captained the SA sevens side.
