= Matt Williams (rugby union coach) =

Australian rugby player (born 1960)

- Born: Matthew Brian Williams; 1960 (age 65–66)
- Height: 5 ft 11 in (180 cm)

Rugby union career
Coaching career
- Years: Team
- 1997–1999: NSW Waratahs
- 2000–2003: Leinster
- 2003–2005: Scotland
- 2007–2010: Ulster
- 2017: Timișoara Saracens

Matt Williams (born 1960) is an Australian rugby union coach who has coached Eastwood and West Harbour in Sydney's Shute Shield. Coached the New South Wales Waratahs in Super Rugby. Coached Leinster to win the first Celtic League competition. Coached Ireland to win the Six Nations A competition before coaching Scotland in the Six Nations. He also coached Ulster in the Heineken Cup and the Magners League before coaching Narbonne in France. He has worked as a pundit for Virgin Media Television and has written for The Irish Times since 2011.

== Playing career ==
Williams played approximately 200 games from 1978 to 1992 with Eastwood and Western Suburbs Rugby Clubs in Sydney and with Swansea RFC in Wales.

== Coaching ==
Williams started by coaching Western Suburbs U20s in Sydney, Australia in 1992. A year later, he became head coach of his former club Eastwood in Sydney in 1993. Later that year, he was appointed fitness and skills coach for the Emerging Wallabies' tour of Zimbabwe, Namibia and South Africa.

In 1995 his coaching stints included New South Wales A, New South Wales Sevens, and as assistant coach for an Australian XV against England A. He was also a coaching assistant at the Wallaby World Cup camps.

In addition to national coaching duties, Williams also coached the Balmain Tigers 7s team in the Coca-Cola World Sevens in Sydney, winning the Cup.

In 1996 he became manager and assistant coach for the NSW Waratahs Super Rugby campaign. For the next three years he was Head Coach for the NSW Waratahs in Super Rugby.

=== Leinster and Ireland "A" ===
In the autumn of 1999, he acted as backs coach in Leinster Rugby's European Cup campaign, becoming the province's head coach in 2000. Williams also undertook the role of defensive coach for the Irish national team in 2001. Leinster won the inaugural Celtic League Final and were knocked out at the semi-final of the European Cup.

Williams was Ireland's defensive coach for the November internationals in 2001 against New Zealand. Williams was also appointed Head Coach of Ireland "A" (not to be confused with the actual Irish team) in 2002-03 and won the Six Nations title with the "A" team.

=== Scotland ===
After success with Ireland A, Williams was reportedly "head hunted" by the SRU and, in 2003, he was appointed as the head coach of Scotland. Williams was only the second Australian in over a century to be appointed as a head coach in the Six Nations Championship — and the Scottish national men's team's first foreign coach.

=== After Scotland ===
After his Scotland tenure, Williams returned to Australia and became head coach of West Harbour rugby club in Sydney from 2006 to 2007 before returning to Ireland to take over the Ulster team mid-season, after they had sacked former coach Mark McCall.

Williams resigned from the post of Head Coach at Ulster Rugby in May 2009.

In 2011 he was head coach of Club Narbonne Méditerranée in France. He resigned in July 2012.

He then returned to Australia and in 2013 he set up the rugby programme at the Knox Sports Academy in Sydney.

From 2018 to 2026 has worked with the Centre de Formation in France for both Racing Club Narbonne and Beziers.

== Media ==
Since 2007 Williams has worked in the Irish media. He has a weekly column in The Irish Times on topical rugby matters. He has been a guest commentator on Today FM's Matt Coopers, Last Word, Newstalk's Off the Ball, and the Eamon Dunphy podcasts.

Williams has worked on television. Working for the ABC in Australia on match analysis, then in Ireland with Setanta TV, TV3 and its successor channel, Virgin Media One.

Preceded by Ian McGeechan	Scotland national rugby union team coach 2003–2005	Succeeded by Frank Hadden
