= 2006 Six Nations Championship squads =

Rugby union competition squads

== England ==
Head coach: Andy Robinson

1. Stuart Abbott
2. Steve Borthwick
3. George Chuter
4. Ben Cohen
5. Martin Corry (c.)
6. Mark Cueto
7. Lawrence Dallaglio
8. Matt Dawson
9. Harry Ellis
10. Perry Freshwater
11. Andy Goode
12. Danny Grewcock
13. Charlie Hodgson
14. Josh Lewsey
15. Lee Mears
16. Lewis Moody
17. Jamie Noon
18. Simon Shaw
19. Andrew Sheridan
20. James Simpson-Daniel
21. Matt Stevens
22. Steve Thompson
23. Mike Tindall
24. Tom Voyce
25. Dave Walder
26. Julian White
27. Joe Worsley

== France ==
Head coach: Bernard Laporte

1. Julien Bonnaire
2. Guillaume Bousses
3. Benjamin Boyet
4. Sébastien Bruno
5. Nicolas Brusque
6. Thomas Castaignède
7. Pieter de Villiers
8. Christophe Dominici
9. Jean-Baptiste Élissalde
10. Florian Fritz
11. Cédric Heymans
12. Raphaël Ibañez
13. Thomas Lièvremont
14. Olivier Magne
15. Sylvain Marconnet
16. Rémy Martin
17. David Marty
18. Frédéric Michalak
19. Olivier Milloud
20. Lionel Nallet
21. Yannick Nyanga
22. Fabien Pelous (c.)
23. Aurélien Rougerie
24. Dimitri Szarzewski
25. Jérôme Thion
26. Damien Traille
27. Ludovic Valbon
28. Dimitri Yachvili

== Ireland ==
Head Coach: Eddie O'Sullivan

Note: Flags indicate national union for the club/province as defined by World Rugby.

Player	Position	Date of birth (age)	Caps	Club/province
Rory Best	Hooker	15 August 1982		(Ireland) Ulster
Jerry Flannery	Hooker	17 October 1978		(Ireland) Munster
Simon Best	Prop	11 February 1978		(Ireland) Ulster
Reggie Corrigan	Prop	19 November 1970		(Ireland) Leinster
John Hayes	Prop	2 November 1973		(Ireland) Munster
Marcus Horan	Prop	7 September 1977		(Ireland) Munster
Donncha O'Callaghan	Lock	23 March 1979		(Ireland) Munster
Paul O'Connell	Lock	20 October 1979		(Ireland) Munster
Mick O'Driscoll	Lock	8 October 1978		(Ireland) Munster
Malcolm O'Kelly	Lock	19 July 1974		(Ireland) Leinster
Simon Easterby	Back row	21 July 1975		(Wales) Scarlets
Denis Leamy	Back row	27 November 1981		(Ireland) Munster
Johnny O'Connor	Back row	9 February 1980		(England) London Wasps
David Wallace	Back row	8 July 1976		(Ireland) Munster
Eoin Reddan	Scrum-half	20 November 1980		(England) Wasps
Peter Stringer	Scrum-half	13 December 1977		(Ireland) Munster
David Humphreys	Fly-half	10 September 1971		(Ireland) Ulster
Ronan O'Gara	Fly-half	7 March 1977		(Ireland) Munster
Gordon D'Arcy	Centre	10 February 1980		(Ireland) Leinster
Brian O'Driscoll (c)	Centre	21 January 1979		(Ireland) Leinster
Tommy Bowe	Wing	22 February 1984		(Ireland) Ulster
Shane Horgan	Wing	18 July 1978		(Ireland) Leinster
Andrew Trimble	Wing	20 October 1984		(Ireland) Ulster
Girvan Dempsey	Fullback	2 October 1975		(Ireland) Leinster
Geordan Murphy	Fullback	19 April 1978		(England) Leicester

== Italy ==
Head coach: (France) Pierre Berbizier

1. Mauro Bergamasco
2. Mirco Bergamasco
3. Valerio Bernabò
4. Marco Bortolami (c.)
5. Gonzalo Canale
6. Pablo Canavosio
7. Martin Castrogiovanni
8. Carlo Del Fava
9. Santiago Dellapè
10. Carlo Festuccia
11. Ezio Galon
12. Paul Griffen
13. Andrea Lo Cicero
14. Carlos Nieto
15. Ludovico Nitoglia
16. Fabio Ongaro
17. Sergio Parisse
18. Aaron Persico
19. Salvatore Perugini
20. Ramiro Pez
21. Simon Picone
22. Josh Sole
23. Cristian Stoica
24. Rima Wakarua
25. Maurizio Zaffiri
26. Alessandro Zanni

== Scotland ==
Head coach: Frank Hadden

1. Mike Blair
2. Chris Cusiter
3. Marcus Di Rollo
4. Bruce Douglas
5. Ross Ford
6. Dougie Hall
7. Andrew Henderson
8. Nathan Hines
9. Ally Hogg
10. Alastair Kellock
11. Gavin Kerr
12. Sean Lamont
13. Scott Lawson
14. Ben MacDougall
15. Scott MacLeod
16. Scott Murray
17. Dan Parks
18. Chris Paterson
19. Jon Petrie
20. Gordon Ross
21. Craig Smith
22. Hugo Southwell
23. Simon Taylor
24. Simon Webster
25. Jason White (c.)

== Wales ==
Head coach: Mike Ruddock (resigned) / Scott Johnson

1. Lee Byrne
2. Colin Charvis
3. Gareth Cooper
4. Barry Davies
5. Mefin Davies
6. Gareth Delve
7. Ian Gough
8. Gavin Henson
9. Dafydd James
10. Gethin Jenkins
11. Adam M. Jones
12. Adam R. Jones
13. Dafydd Jones
14. Duncan Jones
15. Mark Jones
16. Stephen Jones
17. Hal Luscombe
18. Michael Owen (c.)**
19. Dwayne Peel
20. Mike Phillips
21. Alix Popham
22. Nicky Robinson
23. Robert Sidoli
24. Ceri Sweeney
25. Gareth Thomas (c.)*
26. Jonathan Thomas
27. T Rhys Thomas
28. Matthew Watkins
29. Andy Williams
30. Martyn Williams
31. Shane Williams

*captain in the first two games **captain in the third, fourth and fifth games

== Notes and references ==
- RBS Six Nations Squads
