= 2005 Australia rugby union tour of Europe =

Summary
P	W	D	L
Total
5	2	0	3
Test match
4	1	0	3
Opponent
P	W	D	L
France
1	0	0	1
England
1	0	0	1
Ireland
1	1	0	0
Wales
1	0	0	1

The 2005 Wallabies spring tour was a series of five matches played by the Australia national rugby union team in November 2005.

== Matches ==
=== French Barbarians ===
1 November 2005

French Barbarians (France)	12–42	Australia A

Bordeaux

=== France ===
George Gregan played his 115th test match, beating the world record of Jason Robinson

5 November 2005

France	26–16	Australia
Try: Heymans, Martin; Con: Élissalde 2 Pen: Élissalde 3, Michalak		Try: Mitchell; Con: Rogers; Pen: Rogers 3

Stade de France, Paris
Attendance: 60,000
Referee: Paul Honiss (New Zealand)

France: 15. Julien Laharrague, 14. Aurélien Rougerie, 13. Florian Fritz, 12. Yannick Jauzion, 11. Cédric Heymans, 10. Frédéric Michalak, 9. Jean-Baptiste Élissalde, 8. Thomas Lièvremont, 7. Rémy Martin, 6. Yannick Nyanga, 5. Jérôme Thion, 4. Fabien Pelous (c), 3. Pieter de Villiers, 2. Dimitri Szarzewski, 1. Olivier Milloud, – Replacements: 16. Sébastien Bruno, 17. Sylvain Marconnet, 18. Lionel Nallet, 19. Grégory Lamboley, 20. Sébastien Chabal, 21. Yann Delaigue, 22. Thomas Castaignède
Australia: 15. Chris Latham, 14. Wendell Sailor, 13. Lote Tuqiri, 12. Morgan Turinui, 11. Mat Rogers, 10. Matt Giteau, 9. George Gregan (c), 8. George Smith, 7. Phil Waugh, 6. Rocky Elsom, 5. Nathan Sharpe, 4. Mark Chisholm, 3. Al Baxter, 2. Brendan Cannon, 1. Matt Dunning, – Replacements: 16. Stephen Moore, 17. Greg Holmes, 18. Hugh McMeniman, 19. John Roe, 20. Chris Whitaker, 21. Lloyd Johansson, 22. Drew Mitchell

=== England ===
Wallabies lost this match, the same scoreline against France a week earlier. The man of the match was Andrew Sheridan. For the Wallabies the situation was dire, with Eddie Jones facing removal as head coach.

12 November 2005

England	26–16	Australia
Try: Cohen, Cueto; Con: Barkley, Hodgson; Pen: Barkley, Hodgson 2 Drop: Hodgson		Try: Mitchell; Con: Rogers; Pen: Rogers 3

Twickenham Stadium, London
Attendance: 62,000
Referee: Joël Jutge (France)

England: 15. Josh Lewsey, 14. Mark Cueto, 13. Jamie Noon, 12. Mike Tindall, 11. Ben Cohen, 10. Charlie Hodgson, 9. Matt Dawson, 8. Martin Corry (c), 7. Lewis Moody (yellow card) , 6. Pat Sanderson, 5. Danny Grewcock, 4. Steve Borthwick, 3. Phil Vickery, 2. Steve Thompson, 1. Andrew Sheridan, – Replacements: 21. Olly Barkley, 22. Mark van Gisbergen – Unused: 16. Lee Mears, 17. Matt Stevens, 18. Louis Deacon, 19. Chris Jones, 20. Harry Ellis
Australia: 15. Chris Latham, 14. Mark Gerrard, 13. Lote Tuqiri, 12. Morgan Turinui, 11. Drew Mitchell, 10. Mat Rogers, 9. George Gregan (c) (yellow card) , 8. George Smith, 7. Phil Waugh, 6. John Roe, 5. Nathan Sharpe, 4. Hugh McMeniman, 3. Al Baxter (yellow card) , 2. Brendan Cannon, 1. Matt Dunning, – Replacements: 16. Tatafu Polota-Nau, 17. Greg Holmes, 18. Mark Chisholm, 19. Scott Fava, 20. Chris Whitaker, 21. Matt Giteau, 22. Lloyd Johansson

=== Ireland ===
This was the only test match won by the Wallabies. The match was played in Lansdowne Road, with reduced capacity to 42,000 after a fire.

19 November 2005

Ireland	14–30	Australia
Try: Horgan; Pen: Humphreys, O'Gara 2		Try: Latham, Mitchell 2 Con: Rogers 3 Pen: Rogers 3

Lansdowne Road, Dublin
Attendance: 42,000
Referee: Chris White (England)

Ireland: 15. Geordan Murphy, 14. Shane Horgan, 13. Andrew Trimble, 12. Gordon D'Arcy, 11. Tommy Bowe, 10. Ronan O'Gara, 9. Peter Stringer, 8. Denis Leamy, 7. Johnny O'Connor, 6. Simon Easterby (c), 5. Malcolm O'Kelly, 4. Donncha O'Callaghan, 3. John Hayes, 2. Shane Byrne, 1. Marcus Horan, – Replacements: 16. Rory Best, 17. Simon Best, 18. Matt McCullough, 19. Neil Best, 20. Kieran Campbell, 21. David Humphreys, 22. Girvan Dempsey
Australia: 15. Chris Latham, 14. Mark Gerrard, 13. Lote Tuqiri, 12. Morgan Turinui, 11. Drew Mitchell, 10. Mat Rogers, 9. George Gregan (c), 8. George Smith (yellow card) , 7. Phil Waugh, 6. John Roe, 5. Nathan Sharpe, 4. Hugh McMeniman, 3. David Fitter, 2. Brendan Cannon, 1. Greg Holmes, – Replacements: 16. Tatafu Polota-Nau, 17. Al Baxter, 18. Mark Chisholm, 19. Scott Fava, 20. Matt Henjak, 21. Lloyd Johansson, 22. Wendell Sailor

=== Wales ===
After the victory against Ireland, the Wallabies crashed to a low with a close loss to Wales.

The day after the game, Eddie Jones was axed due to poor results.

26 November 2005

Wales	24–22	Australia
Try: S. Williams; Penalty try Con: S. Jones; Pen: S. Jones 4		Try: Latham, Sharpe, Tuqiri; Con: Rogers 2 Pen: Rogers 2

Millennium, Cardiff
Attendance: 74,000
Referee: Tony Spreadbury (England)

Wales: 15. Gareth Thomas (c), 14. Dafydd James, 13. Matthew Watkins, 12. Sonny Parker, 11. Shane Williams, 10. Stephen Jones, 9. Gareth Cooper, 8. Michael Owen, 7. Martyn Williams, 6. Colin Charvis, 5. Robert Sidoli, 4. Ian Gough, 3. Chris Horsman, 2. T.Rhys Thomas, 1. Duncan Jones, – Replacements: 16. Mefin Davies, 17. Adam R. Jones, 21. Ceri Sweeney – Unused: 18. Ian Evans, 19. Jonathan Thomas, 20. Mike Phillips, 22. Lee Byrne
Australia: 15. Chris Latham, 14. Mark Gerrard, 13. Lote Tuqiri, 12. Morgan Turinui, 11. Drew Mitchell, 10. Mat Rogers, 9. George Gregan (c), 8. George Smith, 7. Phil Waugh, 6. John Roe, 5. Nathan Sharpe, 4. Hugh McMeniman, 3. David Fitter, 2. Brendan Cannon, 1. Matt Dunning, – Replacements: 17. Al Baxter, 18. Mark Chisholm, 20. Chris Whitaker, 22. Wendell Sailor – Unused: 16. Tatafu Polota-Nau, 19. Scott Fava, 21. Lloyd Johansson
