= 2005 France rugby union tour of South Africa and Australia =

Rugby union tour

Summary
| P | W | D | L |
Total
| 3 | 0 | 1 | 2 |
Test match
| 3 | 0 | 1 | 2 |
Opponent
| P | W | D | L |
South Africa
| 1 | 0 | 1 | 1 |
Australia
| 1 | 0 | 0 | 1 |

Tour chronology
- ← USA & Canada 2004 Romania & South Africa 2006 →

The 2005 France rugby union tour of South Africa and Australia was a series of matches played in June and July 2005 in South Africa and Australia by France.

== Matches ==
18 June 2005

| South Africa | 30–30 | France |
| Try: De Villiers, Habana 2 Con: Montgomery 3 Pen: Montgomery 2 Drop: Montgomery | | Try: Bonnaire, Candelon; Nyanga, Pape; Con: Élissalde 2 Pen: Élissalde; Drop: Michalak |

Kings Park, Durban
Referee: Daniel Lewis (Ireland)

South Africa: 15.Percy Montgomery, 14.Jean de Villiers, 13.Marius Joubert, 12.De Wet Barry, 11.Bryan Habana, 10.Jaco van der Westhuyzen, 9.Fourie du Preez, 8.Jacques Cronjé, 7.Danie Rossouw, 6.Schalk Burger, 5.Victor Matfield, 4.Albert van den Berg, 3.Eddie Andrews, 2.John Smit (capt.), 1.Os du Randt, – replacements: 17.CJ van der Linde – No entry : 16.Hanyani Shimange, 18.Juan Smith, 19.Joe van Niekerk, 20.Ricky Januarie, 21.Jaque Fourie, 22.Brent Russell
France: 15.Julien Laharrague, 14.Julien Candelon, 13.Florian Fritz, 12.Yannick Jauzion, 11.Cédric Heymans, 10.Frédéric Michalak, 9.Jean-Baptiste Élissalde (capt), 8.Julien Bonnaire, 7.Olivier Magne, 6.Yannick Nyanga, 5.Romain Millo-Chluski, 4.Pascal Papé, 3.Sylvain Marconnet, 2.Sébastien Bruno, 1.Olivier Milloud, – replacements: 16.William Servat, 17.Pieter de Villiers, 18.Gregory Lamboley, 19.Rémy Martin, 20.Dimitri Yachvili, 21.Damien Traille, 22.Nicolas Brusque

25 June 2005

| South Africa | 27–13 | France |
| Try: de Villiers, Habana 2 Con: Montgomery 3 Pen: Montgomery 2 | | Try: Michalak; Con: Michalak; Pen: Michalak, Yachvili |

EPRU Stadium, Port Elisabeth
Attendance: 35000
Referee: Donal Courtney (Ireland)

South Africa: 15.Percy Montgomery, 14.Jean de Villiers, 13.Marius Joubert, 12.De Wet Barry, 11.Bryan Habana, 10.Jaco van der Westhuyzen, 9.Ricky Januarie, 8.Jacques Cronjé, 7.Danie Rossouw, 6.Schalk Burger (yellow card) , 5.Victor Matfield, 4.Albert van den Berg, 3.CJ van der Linde, 2.John Smit (capt.), 1.Lawrence Sephaka, – replacements: 17.Gurthro Steenkamp, 18.Juan Smith, 19.Joe van Niekerk, 20.Fourie du Preez, 21.Jaque Fourie, 22.Brent Russell – No entry : 16.Hanyani Shimange
France: 14.Vincent Clerc, 13.Yannick Jauzion, 12.Damien Traille, 11.Cédric Heymans, 10.Frédéric Michalak, 9.Dimitri Yachvili (capt.), 8.Julien Bonnaire, 7.Rémy Martin, 6.Yannick Nyanga, 5.Thibault Privat, 4.Pascal Papé, 3.Pieter de Villiers, 2.William Servat, 1.Sylvain Marconnet, replacements: 17.Olivier Milloud, 18.Gregory Lamboley, 19.Olivier Magne, 20.Jean-Baptiste Élissalde, 21.Benoit Baby, Julien Laharrague – No entry: 22.Julien Laharrague

2 July 2005

| Australia | 37–31 | France |
| Try: Larkham, Latham; Paul, Sailor, Turinui 2 Con: Giteau, Rogers; Pen: Giteau | | Try: Candelon, Heymans; Laharrague, Traille; Con: Élissalde 4 Pen: Élissalde |

Lang Park, Brisbane
Attendance: 50826
Referee: Nigel Williams (Wales)

Australia: 15.Chris Latham, 14.Wendell Sailor, 13.Stirling Mortlock, 12.Matt Giteau, 11.Lote Tuqiri, 10.Stephen Larkham, 9.George Gregan (capt), 8.David Lyons, 7.George Smith, 6.Rocky Elsom, 5.Nathan Sharpe, 4.Mark Chisholm, 3.Al Baxter, 2.Jeremy Paul, 1.Bill Young, – replacements: 16.Stephen Moore, 17.Matt Dunning, 18.Alister Campbell, 19.John Roe, 20.Chris Whitaker, 21.Morgan Turinui, 22.Mat Rogers
France: 15.Nicolas Brusque, 14.Julien Laharrague, 13.Yannick Jauzion, 12.Benoit Baby, 11.Cédric Heymans, 10.Frédéric Michalak, 9.Jean-Baptiste Élissalde (capt.), 8.Julien Bonnaire, 7.Olivier Magne, 6.Rémy Martin, 5.Pascal Papé, 4.Gregory Lamboley, 3.Denis Avril, 2.Dimitri Szarzewski, 1.Olivier Milloud, – replacements: 16.Sébastien Bruno, 17.Sylvain Marconnet, 18.Thibault Privat, 19.Yannick Nyanga, 20.Pieter de Villiers, 21.Damien Traille, 22.Julien Candelon
