= 2006 Six Nations Championship =

Rugby union championship

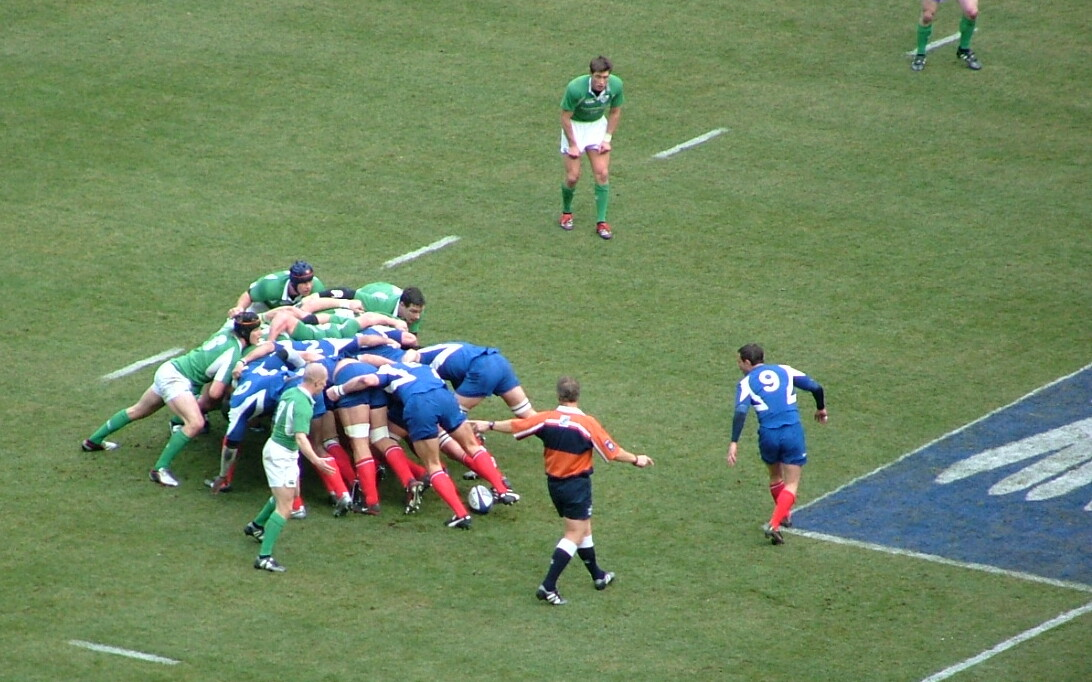
- France playing Ireland on 11 February 2006
- Date: 4 February – 18 March 2006
- Countries: England; France; Ireland; Italy; Scotland; Wales

Tournament statistics
- Champions: France (15th title)
- Triple Crown: Ireland (8th title)
- Matches played: 15
- Tries scored: 61 (4.07 per match)
- Top point scorer: (Ireland) Ronan O'Gara (72)
- Top try scorers: (Italy) Mirco Bergamasco (3) (Ireland) Shane Horgan (3)
- Player of the tournament: (Ireland) Brian O'Driscoll

The 2006 Six Nations Championship was the seventh series of the rugby union Six Nations Championship to be held since the competition expanded in 2000 to include Italy. Including the previous incarnations as the Home Nations and Five Nations, this was the 112th series of the northern hemisphere rugby union championship. This was the fourth edition sponsored by Royal Bank of Scotland.

This was the last Six Nations to be held before the redevelopment of Lansdowne Road into today's Aviva Stadium. Ireland played their 2007, 2008, 2009 and 2010 Six Nations home fixtures at Croke Park, also in Dublin.

In this year, France won the competition on points difference over Ireland. Ireland received the consolation prize of the Triple Crown Trophy, presented for the first time that year, by winning their matches against the other Home Nations: Wales, Scotland and England. Italy once more collected the Wooden Spoon, but showed considerable improvement over past years, earning a first-ever competition point away from home in a draw against Wales. For the first time since 2000, Scotland won the Calcutta Cup.

== Participants ==
| Nation | Venue | City | Head coach | Captain |
|---|---|---|---|---|
| England | Twickenham | London | (England) Andy Robinson | Martin Corry |
| France | Stade de France | Saint-Denis | (France) Bernard Laporte | Fabien Pelous |
| Ireland | Lansdowne Road | Dublin | (Republic of Ireland) Eddie O'Sullivan | Brian O'Driscoll |
| Italy | Stadio Flaminio | Rome | (France) Pierre Berbizier | Marco Bortolami |
| Scotland | Murrayfield | Edinburgh | (Scotland) Frank Hadden | Jason White |
| Wales | Millennium Stadium | Cardiff | (Wales) Mike Ruddock (Australia) Scott Johnson (caretaker) | Gareth Thomas/Michael Owen |

== Table ==
| Pos | Team | Pld | W | D | L | PF | PA | PD | T | Pts |
|---|---|---|---|---|---|---|---|---|---|---|
| 1 | France | 5 | 4 | 0 | 1 | 148 | 85 | +63 | 18 | 8 |
| 2 | Ireland | 5 | 4 | 0 | 1 | 131 | 97 | +34 | 12 | 8 |
| 3 | Scotland | 5 | 3 | 0 | 2 | 78 | 81 | −3 | 5 | 6 |
| 4 | England | 5 | 2 | 0 | 3 | 120 | 106 | +14 | 12 | 4 |
| 5 | Wales | 5 | 1 | 1 | 3 | 80 | 135 | −55 | 9 | 3 |
| 6 | Italy | 5 | 0 | 1 | 4 | 72 | 125 | −53 | 5 | 1 |

Source: Six Nations Rugby

== Results ==
=== Week 1 ===
4 February 2006
13:30 GMT

| Ireland | 26–16 | Italy |
| Try: Flannery 24' c Bowe 46' c Con: O'Gara (2/2) 25', 48'; Pen: O'Gara (4/5) 39', 58', 66', 77' | Report | Try: Mi. Bergamasco 28' c Con: Pez (1/1) 29'; Pen: Pez (2/3) 12', 60'; Griffen (1/1) 44' |

Lansdowne Road, Dublin
Attendance: 49,500
Referee: Dave Pearson (England)

| FB | 15 | Geordan Murphy |
| RW | 14 | Shane Horgan |
| OC | 13 | Brian O'Driscoll |
| IC | 12 | Gordon D'Arcy |
| LW | 11 | Tommy Bowe |
| FH | 10 | Ronan O'Gara |
| SH | 9 | Peter Stringer |
| N8 | 8 | Denis Leamy |
| OF | 7 | David Wallace |
| BF | 6 | Simon Easterby |
| RL | 5 | Paul O'Connell |
| LL | 4 | Malcolm O'Kelly | (substituted off) 61' |
| TP | 3 | John Hayes |
| HK | 2 | Jerry Flannery |
| LP | 1 | Marcus Horan |
Substitutions:
| HK | 16 | Rory Best |
| PR | 17 | Simon Best |
| LK | 18 | Donncha O'Callaghan | (substituted on) 61' |
| FL | 19 | Johnny O'Connor |
| SH | 20 | Eoin Reddan |
| FH | 21 | David Humphreys |
| WG | 22 | Andrew Trimble |
Coach:
Eddie O'Sullivan

| FB | 15 | Cristian Stoica |
| RW | 14 | Pablo Canavosio |
| OC | 13 | Gonzalo Canale |
| IC | 12 | Mirco Bergamasco |
| LW | 11 | Ludovico Nitoglia |
| FH | 10 | Ramiro Pez | (yellow card) 38' |
| SH | 9 | Paul Griffen |
| N8 | 8 | Sergio Parisse |
| OF | 7 | Mauro Bergamasco | | (substituted off) 61' |
| BF | 6 | Josh Sole |
| RL | 5 | Andrea Lo Cicero | | 26' to 32' | | (substituted off) 66' |
| LL | 4 | Santiago Dellapè |
| TP | 3 | Walter Pozzebon | | (substituted off) 66' |
| HK | 2 | Fabio Ongaro |
| LP | 1 | Salvatore Perugini |
Substitutions:
| HK | 16 | Carlo Festuccia |
| PR | 17 | Andrea Moretti |
| PR | 18 | Martín Castrogiovanni | | (substituted on) 66' |
| LK | 19 | Carlo Del Fava | | (substituted on) 26' | (substituted off) 32' | (substituted on) 66' |
| FL | 20 | Aaron Persico | | (substituted on) 61' |
| SH | 21 | David Dal Maso |
| FH | 22 | Rima Wakarua |
Coach:
Pierre Berbizier

4 February 2006
15:30 GMT

| England | 47–13 | Wales |
| Try: Cueto 13' c Moody 29' m Tindall 62' m Dallaglio 70' c Dawson 74' c Voyce 79' c Con: Hodgson (2/3) 14', 71'; Goode (2/3) 75', 79'; Pen: Hodgson (3/4) 26', 44', 53' | Report | Try: M. Williams 33' c Con: S. Jones (1/1) 33'; Pen: S. Jones (2/2) 19', 52' |

Twickenham Stadium, London
Attendance: 81,000
Referee: Paul Honiss (New Zealand)

| FB | 15 | Josh Lewsey | (substituted off) 20' |
| RW | 14 | Mark Cueto |
| OC | 13 | Jamie Noon |
| IC | 12 | Mike Tindall |
| LW | 11 | Ben Cohen |
| FH | 10 | Charlie Hodgson | (substituted off) 73' |
| SH | 9 | Harry Ellis | (substituted off) 72' |
| N8 | 8 | Martin Corry | | | (substituted off) 63' |
| OF | 7 | Lewis Moody |
| BF | 6 | Joe Worsley | 6' to 12' |
| RL | 5 | Danny Grewcock | (substituted off) 72' |
| LL | 4 | Steve Borthwick |
| TP | 3 | Matt Stevens |
| HK | 2 | Steve Thompson | (substituted off) 63' |
| LP | 1 | Andrew Sheridan | (substituted off) 68' |
Substitutions:
| HK | 16 | Lee Mears | (substituted on) 63' |
| PR | 17 | Julian White | (substituted on) 68' |
| LK | 18 | Simon Shaw | (substituted on) 72' |
| N8 | 19 | Lawrence Dallaglio | (substituted on) 6' | (substituted off) 12' | (substituted on) 63' |
| SH | 20 | Matt Dawson | (substituted on) 72' |
| FH | 21 | Andy Goode | (substituted on) 73' |
| FB | 22 | Tom Voyce | (substituted on) 20' |
Coach:
Andy Robinson

| FB | 15 | Gareth Thomas |
| RW | 14 | Mark Jones |
| OC | 13 | Hal Luscombe |
| IC | 12 | Matthew Watkins | 6' to 16' |
| LW | 11 | Shane Williams |
| FH | 10 | Stephen Jones |
| SH | 9 | Dwayne Peel | (substituted off) 65' |
| N8 | 8 | Michael Owen |
| OF | 7 | Martyn Williams |
| BF | 6 | Colin Charvis | (substituted off) 72' |
| RL | 5 | Robert Sidoli |
| LL | 4 | Ian Gough | 13' to 19' | | (substituted off) 65' |
| TP | 3 | Adam R. Jones | (substituted off) 60' |
| HK | 2 | T. Rhys Thomas |
| LP | 1 | Duncan Jones |
Substitutions:
| HK | 16 | Mefin Davies |
| PR | 17 | Gethin Jenkins | (substituted on) 60' |
| LK | 18 | Adam M. Jones | (substituted on) 13' | (substituted off) 19' | (substituted on) 65' |
| N8 | 19 | Alix Popham | (substituted on) 72' |
| SH | 20 | Gareth Cooper | (substituted on) 65' | | (substituted off) 79' |
| FH | 21 | Nicky Robinson |
| FB | 22 | Lee Byrne | (substituted on) 6' | (substituted off) 16' | (substituted on) 79' |
Coach:
Mike Ruddock

Notes:

- This was England's biggest win against Wales since 2002.

5 February 2006
15:00 GMT

| Scotland | 20–16 | France |
| Try: Lamont (2) 10' c, 45' c Con: Paterson (2/2) 10', 46'; Pen: Paterson (2/3) 21', 31' | Report | Try: Bonnaire 49' m Bruno 75' m Pen: Élissalde (2/2) 40', 60' |

Murrayfield Stadium, Edinburgh
Attendance: 66,028
Referee: Jonathan Kaplan (South Africa)

| FB | 15 | Hugo Southwell |
| RW | 14 | Chris Paterson |
| OC | 13 | Marcus Di Rollo | (substituted off) 28' |
| IC | 12 | Andrew Henderson |
| LW | 11 | Sean Lamont |
| FH | 10 | Dan Parks | (substituted off) 63' |
| SH | 9 | Mike Blair | (substituted off) 55' |
| N8 | 8 | Simon Taylor |
| OF | 7 | Ally Hogg |
| BF | 6 | Jason White | (substituted off) 70' |
| RL | 5 | Scott Murray |
| LL | 4 | Alastair Kellock | (substituted off) 71' |
| TP | 3 | Bruce Douglas | (substituted off) 40' |
| HK | 2 | Dougie Hall | (substituted off) 63' |
| LP | 1 | Gavin Kerr |
Substitutions:
| HK | 16 | Scott Lawson | (substituted on) 63' |
| PR | 17 | Craig Smith | (substituted on) 40' |
| LK | 18 | Scott MacLeod | (substituted on) 71' |
| FL | 19 | Jon Petrie | (substituted on) 70' |
| SH | 20 | Chris Cusiter | (substituted on) 55' |
| FH | 21 | Gordon Ross | (substituted on) 63' |
| WG | 22 | Simon Webster | (substituted on) 28' |
Coach:
Frank Hadden

| FB | 15 | Nicolas Brusque | (substituted off) 74' |
| RW | 14 | Cédric Heymans |
| OC | 13 | Florian Fritz |
| IC | 12 | Ludovic Valbon |
| LW | 11 | Christophe Dominici |
| FH | 10 | Frédéric Michalak |
| SH | 9 | Jean-Baptiste Élissalde | (substituted off) 79' |
| N8 | 8 | Julien Bonnaire | (substituted off) 70' |
| OF | 7 | Rémy Martin |
| BF | 6 | Yannick Nyanga |
| RL | 5 | Jérôme Thion |
| LL | 4 | Fabien Pelous |
| TP | 3 | Pieter de Villiers | (substituted off) 63' |
| HK | 2 | Dimitri Szarzewski | (substituted off) 64' |
| LP | 1 | Sylvain Marconnet |
Substitutions:
| HK | 16 | Sébastien Bruno | (substituted on) 64' |
| PR | 17 | Olivier Milloud | (substituted on) 63' |
| LK | 18 | Lionel Nallet |
| N8 | 19 | Thomas Lièvremont | (substituted on) 70' |
| SH | 20 | Dimitri Yachvili | (substituted on) 79' |
| FH | 21 | Benjamin Boyet |
| CE | 22 | Guillaume Boussès | (substituted on) 74' |
Coach:
Bernard Laporte

Notes:

- This was Scotland's first victory against France at Murrayfield Stadium since 1996.
- This was Scotland's first victory against France since 1999.
- Scotland won their opening match for the first time in the Six Nations.
- This was Nicolas Brusque's last game for France.

=== Week 2 ===
11 February 2006
13:30 GMT

| France | 43–31 | Ireland |
| Try: Rougerie 2' m Magne 6' c Marty (2) 17' c, 47' c Heymans (2) 34' c, 44' c Con: Élissalde (5/6) 7', 18', 35', 45', 47'; Pen: Élissalde (1/1) 29' | Report | Try: O'Gara 56' c D'Arcy 60' c O'Callaghan 65' c Trimble 69' c Con: O'Gara (4/4) 56', 60', 66', 69'; Pen: O'Gara (1/2) 27' |

Stade de France, Saint-Denis
Attendance: 80,000
Referee: Paul Honiss (New Zealand)

| FB | 15 | Christophe Dominici |
| RW | 14 | Aurélien Rougerie |
| OC | 13 | Florian Fritz |
| IC | 12 | David Marty |
| LW | 11 | Cédric Heymans |
| FH | 10 | Frédéric Michalak | (substituted off) 67' |
| SH | 9 | Jean-Baptiste Élissalde | (substituted off) 57' |
| N8 | 8 | Julien Bonnaire |
| OF | 7 | Olivier Magne | (substituted off) 37' | (substituted on) 40' | (substituted off) 57' | (substituted on) 71' | (substituted off) 72' |
| BF | 6 | Yannick Nyanga | (substituted off) 70' |
| RL | 5 | Jérôme Thion |
| LL | 4 | Fabien Pelous |
| TP | 3 | Pieter de Villiers |
| HK | 2 | Raphaël Ibañez | (substituted off) 46' |
| LP | 1 | Olivier Milloud | (substituted off) 57' |
Substitutions:
| HK | 16 | Sébastien Bruno | (substituted on) 46' |
| PR | 17 | Sylvain Marconnet | (substituted on) 57' |
| LK | 18 | Lionel Nallet | (substituted on) 70' |
| FL | 19 | Rémy Martin | (substituted on) 37' | (substituted off) 40' | (substituted on) 57' | (substituted off) 71' | (substituted on) 72' |
| SH | 20 | Dimitri Yachvili | (substituted on) 57' |
| FH | 21 | Benjamin Boyet | (substituted on) 67' |
| CE | 22 | Ludovic Valbon |
Coach:
Bernard Laporte

| FB | 15 | Geordan Murphy |
| RW | 14 | Shane Horgan |
| OC | 13 | Brian O'Driscoll |
| IC | 12 | Gordon D'Arcy |
| LW | 11 | Tommy Bowe | (substituted off) 61' |
| FH | 10 | Ronan O'Gara |
| SH | 9 | Peter Stringer |
| N8 | 8 | Denis Leamy |
| OF | 7 | David Wallace |
| BF | 6 | Simon Easterby |
| RL | 5 | Paul O'Connell |
| LL | 4 | Malcolm O'Kelly | (substituted off) 49' |
| TP | 3 | John Hayes |
| HK | 2 | Jerry Flannery |
| LP | 1 | Reggie Corrigan | (substituted off) 49' |
Substitutions:
| HK | 16 | Rory Best |
| PR | 17 | Simon Best | (substituted on) 49' |
| LK | 18 | Donncha O'Callaghan | (substituted on) 49' |
| FL | 19 | Johnny O'Connor |
| SH | 20 | Eoin Reddan |
| FH | 21 | David Humphreys |
| WG | 22 | Andrew Trimble | (substituted on) 61' |
Coach:
Eddie O'Sullivan

Notes:

- Ronan O'Gara became Ireland's all-time top point-scorer after converting Andrew Trimble's try.

11 February 2006
16:00 GMT

| Italy | 16–31 | England |
| Try: Mi. Bergamasco 77' c Con: Pez (1/1) 78'; Pen: Pez (1/2) 32'; Drop: Pez (2/2) 35', 41' | Report | Try: Tindall 25' c Hodgson 54' c Cueto 65' c Simpson-Daniel 80' c Con: Hodgson (4/4) 26', 55', 66', 80'; Pen: Hodgson (1/2) 49' |

Stadio Flaminio, Rome
Attendance: 24,973
Referee: Kelvin Deaker (New Zealand)

| FB | 15 | Cristian Stoica |
| RW | 14 | Pablo Canavosio | (substituted off) 59' |
| OC | 13 | Gonzalo Canale |
| IC | 12 | Mirco Bergamasco |
| LW | 11 | Ludovico Nitoglia |
| FH | 10 | Ramiro Pez |
| SH | 9 | Paul Griffen |
| N8 | 8 | Sergio Parisse |
| OF | 7 | Mauro Bergamasco |
| BF | 6 | Josh Sole | (substituted off) 56' |
| RL | 5 | Marco Bortolami |
| LL | 4 | Santiago Dellapè | (substituted off) 56' |
| TP | 3 | Carlos Nieto | (substituted off) 64' |
| HK | 2 | Fabio Ongaro | (substituted off) 64' |
| LP | 1 | Salvatore Perugini | (substituted off) 67' |
Substitutions:
| HK | 16 | Carlo Festuccia | (substituted on) 64' |
| PR | 17 | Andrea Lo Cicero | (substituted on) 67' |
| PR | 18 | Martín Castrogiovanni | (substituted on) 64' |
| LK | 19 | Carlo Del Fava | (substituted on) 56' |
| FL | 20 | Silvio Orlando | (substituted on) 56' |
| SH | 21 | Simon Picone | (substituted on) 59' |
| FH | 22 | Rima Wakarua |
Coach:
Pierre Berbizier

| FB | 15 | Tom Voyce |
| RW | 14 | Mark Cueto |
| OC | 13 | Jamie Noon |
| IC | 12 | Mike Tindall | (substituted off) 76' |
| LW | 11 | Ben Cohen |
| FH | 10 | Charlie Hodgson |
| SH | 9 | Harry Ellis | (substituted off) 54' |
| N8 | 8 | Martin Corry |
| OF | 7 | Lewis Moody |
| BF | 6 | Joe Worsley | (substituted off) 65' |
| RL | 5 | Danny Grewcock | (substituted off) 69' |
| LL | 4 | Steve Borthwick |
| TP | 3 | Matt Stevens |
| HK | 2 | Steve Thompson | (substituted off) 60' |
| LP | 1 | Andrew Sheridan | (substituted off) 60' |
Substitutions:
| HK | 16 | Lee Mears | (substituted on) 60' |
| PR | 17 | Julian White | (substituted on) 60' |
| LK | 18 | Simon Shaw | (substituted on) 69' |
| N8 | 19 | Lawrence Dallaglio | (substituted on) 65' |
| SH | 20 | Matt Dawson | (substituted on) 54' |
| FH | 21 | Andy Goode |
| WG | 22 | James Simpson-Daniel | (substituted on) 76' |
Coach:
Andy Robinson

12 February 2006
15:00 GMT

| Wales | 28–18 | Scotland |
| Try: Penalty try 5' c G. Thomas (2) 32' c, 61' c Sidoli 52' c Con: S. Jones (4/4) 6', 33', 53', 63' | Report | Try: Southwell 77' m Paterson 79' c Con: Paterson (1/2) 79'; Pen: Paterson (2/2) 17', 37' |

Millennium Stadium, Cardiff
Attendance: 73,340
Referee: Steve Walsh (New Zealand)

| FB | 15 | Gareth Thomas |
| RW | 14 | Mark Jones |
| OC | 13 | Hal Luscombe | (substituted off) 29' | (substituted on) 40' |
| IC | 12 | Matthew Watkins |
| LW | 11 | Shane Williams |
| FH | 10 | Stephen Jones |
| SH | 9 | Dwayne Peel |
| N8 | 8 | Michael Owen |
| OF | 7 | Martyn Williams |
| BF | 6 | Colin Charvis | (substituted off) 66' |
| RL | 5 | Robert Sidoli |
| LL | 4 | Ian Gough |
| TP | 3 | Adam R. Jones | (substituted off) 68' |
| HK | 2 | T. Rhys Thomas | (substituted off) 76' |
| LP | 1 | Duncan Jones |
Substitutions:
| HK | 16 | Mefin Davies | (substituted on) 76' |
| PR | 17 | Gethin Jenkins | (substituted on) 68' |
| LK | 18 | Adam M. Jones |
| N8 | 19 | Gareth Delve | (substituted on) 66' |
| SH | 20 | Mike Phillips |
| FH | 21 | Nicky Robinson |
| FB | 22 | Lee Byrne | (substituted on) 29' | (substituted off) 40' |
Coach:
Mike Ruddock

| FB | 15 | Hugo Southwell |
| RW | 14 | Chris Paterson |
| OC | 13 | Ben MacDougall |
| IC | 12 | Andrew Henderson |
| LW | 11 | Sean Lamont |
| FH | 10 | Dan Parks |
| SH | 9 | Mike Blair | (substituted off) 60' |
| N8 | 8 | Simon Taylor |
| OF | 7 | Ally Hogg | (substituted off) 66' |
| BF | 6 | Jason White |
| RL | 5 | Scott Murray |
| LL | 4 | Alastair Kellock | (substituted off) 66' |
| TP | 3 | Bruce Douglas |
| HK | 2 | Scott Lawson | (substituted off) 53' |
| LP | 1 | Gavin Kerr |
Substitutions:
| HK | 16 | Ross Ford | (substituted on) 53' |
| PR | 17 | Craig Smith |
| LK | 18 | Scott MacLeod |
| FL | 19 | Jon Petrie | (substituted on) 66' |
| SH | 20 | Chris Cusiter |
| FH | 21 | Gordon Ross | (substituted on) 60' |
| WG | 22 | Simon Webster | (substituted on) 66' |
Coach:
Frank Hadden

Notes:

- Steve Walsh showed Scott Murray a red card after he kicked Ian Gough in the face in a ruck. This was the first red card issued in the Six Nations since Alessandro Troncon was sent off against Ireland in 2001.
- Mike Ruddock resigned as Wales coach after this match due to a conflict with the Welsh Rugby Union.

=== Week 3 ===
25 February 2006
14:00 GMT

| France | 37–12 | Italy |
| Try: Lièvremont 25' m Nyanga 56' m De Villiers 64' c Rougerie 76' c Michalak 78' c Con: Yachvili (3/5) 64', 76', 79'; Pen: Élissalde (1/2) 2'; Yachvili (1/2) 44' | Report | Pen: Pez (3/4) 8', 16', 22'; Drop: Pez (1/1) 31' |

Stade de France, Saint-Denis
Attendance: 73,978
Referee: Tony Spreadbury (England)

| FB | 15 | Thomas Castaignède |
| RW | 14 | Aurélien Rougerie |
| OC | 13 | Florian Fritz |
| IC | 12 | Damien Traille | (substituted off) 51' |
| LW | 11 | Christophe Dominici |
| FH | 10 | Frédéric Michalak |
| SH | 9 | Jean-Baptiste Élissalde |
| N8 | 8 | Thomas Lièvremont |
| OF | 7 | Olivier Magne | (substituted off) 73' |
| BF | 6 | Yannick Nyanga |
| RL | 5 | Jérôme Thion |
| LL | 4 | Fabien Pelous |
| TP | 3 | Pieter de Villiers |
| HK | 2 | Raphaël Ibañez |
| LP | 1 | Olivier Milloud | (substituted off) 51' |
Substitutions:
| HK | 16 | Sébastien Bruno |
| PR | 17 | Sylvain Marconnet | (substituted on) 51' |
| LK | 18 | Lionel Nallet |
| FL | 19 | Julien Bonnaire | (substituted on) 73' |
| SH | 20 | Dimitri Yachvili |
| CE | 21 | David Marty | (substituted on) 51' |
| FB | 22 | Cédric Heymans |
Coach:
Bernard Laporte

| FB | 15 | Cristian Stoica |
| RW | 14 | Pablo Canavosio |
| OC | 13 | Gonzalo Canale |
| IC | 12 | Mirco Bergamasco |
| LW | 11 | David dal Maso |
| FH | 10 | Ramiro Pez |
| SH | 9 | Paul Griffen | 2' to 9' | | 61' to 63' |
| N8 | 8 | Sergio Parisse |
| OF | 7 | Mauro Bergamasco |
| BF | 6 | Josh Sole | (substituted off) 74' |
| RL | 5 | Marco Bortolami |
| LL | 4 | Carlo Del Fava |
| TP | 3 | Enrico Pavanello | (substituted off) 65' |
| HK | 2 | Fabio Ongaro | (substituted off) 68' |
| LP | 1 | Salvatore Perugini | (substituted off) 70' |
Substitutions:
| HK | 16 | Giorgio Intoppa | (substituted on) 68' |
| PR | 17 | Andrea Lo Cicero | (substituted on) 70' |
| PR | 18 | Mario Savi | (substituted on) 65' |
| LK | 19 | Valerio Bernabò |
| FL | 20 | Alessandro Zanni | (substituted on) 74' |
| SH | 21 | Roberto Pedrazzi | (substituted on) 2' | (substituted off) 9' | (substituted on) 61' | (substituted off) 63' |
| WG | 22 | Ezio Galon |
Coach:
Pierre Berbizier

25 February 2006
17:30 GMT

| Scotland | 18–12 | England |
| Pen: Paterson (5/5) 2', 42', 47', 71', 77'; Drop: Parks (1/1) 55' | Report | Pen: Hodgson (4/5) 7', 40', 61', 74' |

Murrayfield Stadium, Edinburgh
Attendance: 67,500
Referee: Alan Lewis (Ireland)

| FB | 15 | Hugo Southwell |
| RW | 14 | Chris Paterson |
| OC | 13 | Marcus Di Rollo | (substituted off) 78' |
| IC | 12 | Andrew Henderson |
| LW | 11 | Sean Lamont |
| FH | 10 | Dan Parks | (substituted off) 63' |
| SH | 9 | Mike Blair | (substituted off) 63' |
| N8 | 8 | Simon Taylor |
| OF | 7 | Ally Hogg |
| BF | 6 | Jason White |
| RL | 5 | Alastair Kellock |
| LL | 4 | Scott MacLeod | (substituted off) 51' |
| TP | 3 | Bruce Douglas | (substituted off) 60' |
| HK | 2 | Dougie Hall | (substituted off) 58' |
| LP | 1 | Gavin Kerr |
Substitutions:
| HK | 16 | Ross Ford | (substituted on) 58' |
| PR | 17 | Craig Smith | (substituted on) 60' |
| LK | 18 | Nathan Hines | (substituted on) 51' |
| FL | 19 | Jon Petrie |
| SH | 20 | Chris Cusiter | (substituted on) 63' |
| FH | 21 | Gordon Ross | (substituted on) 63' |
| WG | 22 | Simon Webster | (substituted on) 78' |
Coach:
Frank Hadden

| FB | 15 | Josh Lewsey |
| RW | 14 | Mark Cueto |
| OC | 13 | Jamie Noon |
| IC | 12 | Mike Tindall |
| LW | 11 | Ben Cohen |
| FH | 10 | Charlie Hodgson |
| SH | 9 | Harry Ellis | | (substituted off) 50' | (substituted on) 62' | (substituted off) 72' |
| N8 | 8 | Martin Corry | | (substituted off) 63' |
| OF | 7 | Lewis Moody |
| BF | 6 | Joe Worsley |
| RL | 5 | Danny Grewcock | (yellow card) 23' | (substituted off) 67' |
| LL | 4 | Steve Borthwick |
| TP | 3 | Julian White |
| HK | 2 | Steve Thompson |
| LP | 1 | Andrew Sheridan | | (substituted off) 40' | (substituted on) 75' |
Substitutions:
| HK | 16 | George Chuter |
| PR | 17 | Perry Freshwater | | (substituted on) 40' | (substituted off) 75' |
| LK | 18 | Simon Shaw | | (substituted on) 67' |
| N8 | 19 | Lawrence Dallaglio | | (substituted on) 63' |
| SH | 20 | Matt Dawson | | (substituted on) 50' | (substituted off) 62' | (substituted on) 72' |
| FH | 21 | Andy Goode |
| FB | 22 | Tom Voyce |
Coach:
Andy Robinson

Notes:

- This was Scotland's first victory against England since 2000.
- Scotland won the Calcutta Cup for the first time since 2000.
- England's defeat meant no team was able to win the Grand Slam.
- Scott Murray's suspension meant he missed his first match in the Championship, bringing to an end a run of 36 consecutive appearances.

26 February 2006
15:00 GMT

| Ireland | 31–5 | Wales |
| Try: Wallace 23' m Horgan 43' c Stringer 79' c Con: O'Gara (2/3) 44', 79'; Pen: O'Gara (4/5) 15', 32', 47', 58' | Report | Try: M. Jones 7' m |

Lansdowne Road, Dublin
Attendance: 49,500
Referee: Jonathan Kaplan (South Africa)

| FB | 15 | Geordan Murphy |
| RW | 14 | Shane Horgan |
| OC | 13 | Brian O'Driscoll |
| IC | 12 | Gordon D'Arcy |
| LW | 11 | Andrew Trimble |
| FH | 10 | Ronan O'Gara |
| SH | 9 | Peter Stringer |
| N8 | 8 | Denis Leamy |
| OF | 7 | David Wallace | (substituted off) 74' |
| BF | 6 | Simon Easterby | (substituted off) 76' |
| RL | 5 | Malcolm O'Kelly |
| LL | 4 | Donncha O'Callaghan |
| TP | 3 | John Hayes |
| HK | 2 | Jerry Flannery | (substituted off) 77' |
| LP | 1 | Marcus Horan | (substituted off) 68' |
Substitutions:
| HK | 16 | Rory Best | (substituted on) 77' |
| PR | 17 | Simon Best | (substituted on) 68' |
| LK | 18 | Mick O'Driscoll | (substituted on) 76' |
| FL | 19 | Johnny O'Connor | (substituted on) 74' |
| SH | 20 | Eoin Reddan |
| FH | 21 | David Humphreys |
| FB | 22 | Girvan Dempsey |
Coach:
Eddie O'Sullivan

| FB | 15 | Lee Byrne | (substituted off) 72' |
| RW | 14 | Mark Jones |
| OC | 13 | Hal Luscombe |
| IC | 12 | Matthew Watkins |
| LW | 11 | Dafydd James |
| FH | 10 | Stephen Jones | (substituted off) 18' |
| SH | 9 | Dwayne Peel |
| N8 | 8 | Michael Owen |
| OF | 7 | Martyn Williams |
| BF | 6 | Colin Charvis | (substituted off) 55' |
| RL | 5 | Robert Sidoli |
| LL | 4 | Ian Gough |
| TP | 3 | Adam R. Jones |
| HK | 2 | T. Rhys Thomas | (substituted off) 60' |
| LP | 1 | Duncan Jones | (substituted off) 45' |
Substitutions:
| HK | 16 | Mefin Davies | (substituted on) 60' |
| PR | 17 | Gethin Jenkins | (substituted on) 45' |
| FL | 18 | Jonathan Thomas |
| N8 | 19 | Gareth Delve | (substituted on) 55' |
| SH | 20 | Mike Phillips |
| CE | 21 | Gavin Henson | (substituted on) 18' |
| FB | 22 | Barry Davies | (substituted on) 72' |
Caretaker coach:
Scott Johnson

Notes:

- This was Wales' biggest defeat against Ireland since 2002.

=== Week 4 ===
11 March 2006
13:30 GMT

| Wales | 18–18 | Italy |
| Try: M. Jones 9' m S. Jones 25' c Con: S. Jones (1/2) 25'; Pen: S. Jones (2/2) 3', 58' | Report | Try: Galon 14' m Canavosio 38' c Con: Pez (1/2) 40'; Pen: Pez (2/5) 32', 45' |

Millennium Stadium, Cardiff
Attendance: 74,000
Referee: Joël Jutge (France)

| FB | 15 | Lee Byrne |
| RW | 14 | Mark Jones |
| OC | 13 | Hal Luscombe |
| IC | 12 | Matthew Watkins |
| LW | 11 | Shane Williams |
| FH | 10 | Stephen Jones |
| SH | 9 | Dwayne Peel | (substituted off) 7' |
| N8 | 8 | Michael Owen |
| OF | 7 | Martyn Williams |
| BF | 6 | Colin Charvis | (substituted off) 51' |
| RL | 5 | Robert Sidoli |
| LL | 4 | Ian Gough |
| TP | 3 | Adam R. Jones |
| HK | 2 | T. Rhys Thomas | (substituted off) 70' |
| LP | 1 | Duncan Jones | (substituted off) 56' |
Substitutions:
| HK | 16 | Mefin Davies | (substituted on) 70' |
| PR | 17 | Gethin Jenkins | (substituted on) 56' |
| FL | 18 | Jonathan Thomas |
| N8 | 19 | Alix Popham | (substituted on) 51' |
| SH | 20 | Mike Phillips | (substituted on) 7' |
| FH | 21 | Nicky Robinson |
| CE | 22 | Gavin Henson |
Caretaker coach:
Scott Johnson

| FB | 15 | Ezio Galon |
| RW | 14 | Pablo Canavosio | (substituted off) 46' |
| OC | 13 | Gonzalo Canale |
| IC | 12 | Mirco Bergamasco |
| LW | 11 | Ludovico Nitoglia |
| FH | 10 | Ramiro Pez |
| SH | 9 | Paul Griffen |
| N8 | 8 | Josh Sole |
| OF | 7 | Maurizio Zaffiri | (substituted off) 79' |
| BF | 6 | Sergio Parisse |
| RL | 5 | Michele Sepe |
| LL | 4 | Santiago Dellapè | (substituted off) 49' |
| TP | 3 | David Dal Maso | (substituted off) 27' |
| HK | 2 | Carlo Festuccia | (substituted off) 66' |
| LP | 1 | Salvatore Perugini |
Substitutions:
| HK | 16 | Fabio Ongaro | (substituted on) 66' |
| PR | 17 | Andrea Lo Cicero | (substituted on) 79' |
| PR | 18 | Martín Castrogiovanni | (substituted on) 27' |
| LK | 19 | Carlo Del Fava | (substituted on) 49' |
| FL | 20 | Alessandro Zanni |
| SH | 21 | Giorgio Intoppa |
| FB | 22 | Cristian Stoica | (substituted on) 46' |
Coach:
Pierre Berbizier

Notes:

- Italy won their first points in an away match in the competition.
- This was the first draw in the Six Nations since Scotland and Wales drew 28–28 in 2001.

11 March 2006
15:30 GMT

| Ireland | 15–9 | Scotland |
| Pen: O'Gara (5/7) 2', 9', 23', 37', 55' | Report | Pen: Paterson (3/3) 10', 16', 27' |

Lansdowne Road, Dublin
Referee: Stuart Dickinson (Australia)

| FB | 15 | Geordan Murphy |
| RW | 14 | Shane Horgan |
| OC | 13 | Brian O'Driscoll |
| IC | 12 | Gordon D'Arcy |
| LW | 11 | Andrew Trimble |
| FH | 10 | Ronan O'Gara |
| SH | 9 | Peter Stringer |
| N8 | 8 | Denis Leamy |
| OF | 7 | David Wallace |
| BF | 6 | Simon Easterby |
| RL | 5 | Paul O'Connell | (substituted off) 65' |
| LL | 4 | Malcolm O'Kelly |
| TP | 3 | John Hayes |
| HK | 2 | Jerry Flannery |
| LP | 1 | Marcus Horan |
Substitutions:
| HK | 16 | Rory Best |
| PR | 17 | Simon Best |
| LK | 18 | Donncha O'Callaghan | (substituted on) 65' |
| FL | 19 | Johnny O'Connor |
| SH | 20 | Eoin Reddan |
| FH | 21 | David Humphreys |
| FB | 22 | Girvan Dempsey |
Coach:
Eddie O'Sullivan

| FB | 15 | Hugo Southwell |
| RW | 14 | Chris Paterson | (substituted off) 69' |
| OC | 13 | Marcus Di Rollo |
| IC | 12 | Andrew Henderson |
| LW | 11 | Sean Lamont |
| FH | 10 | Dan Parks | (substituted off) 57' |
| SH | 9 | Mike Blair | (substituted off) 57' |
| N8 | 8 | Simon Taylor |
| OF | 7 | Ally Hogg |
| BF | 6 | Jason White | (substituted off) 71' |
| RL | 5 | Scott Murray |
| LL | 4 | Nathan Hines |
| TP | 3 | Bruce Douglas | 55' to 61' | | (substituted off) 69' |
| HK | 2 | Dougie Hall | (substituted off) 61' |
| LP | 1 | Gavin Kerr |
Substitutions:
| HK | 16 | Scott Lawson | (substituted on) 61' |
| PR | 17 | Craig Smith | (substituted on) 55' | (substituted off) 61' | (substituted on) 69' |
| LK | 18 | Alastair Kellock |
| FL | 19 | Jon Petrie | (substituted on) 71' |
| SH | 20 | Chris Cusiter | (substituted on) 57' |
| FH | 21 | Gordon Ross | (substituted on) 57' |
| WG | 22 | Simon Webster | (substituted on) 69' |
Coach:
Frank Hadden

Notes:

- This was Ireland's narrowest victory over Scotland since 1988.
- This was the last game ever played at Lansdowne Road in the Championship.

12 March 2006
15:00 GMT

| France | 31–6 | England |
| Try: Fritz 1' c Traille 66' m Dominici 78' c Con: Yachvili (2/3) 1', 79'; Pen: Yachvili (4/6) 6', 11', 33', 72' | Report | Pen: Hodgson 40' (1/2); Goode (1/1) 42' |

Stade de France, Saint-Denis
Attendance: 74,000
Referee: Alain Rolland (Ireland)

| FB | 15 | Thomas Castaignède |
| RW | 14 | Aurélien Rougerie |
| OC | 13 | Florian Fritz |
| IC | 12 | Damien Traille | (substituted off) 72' |
| LW | 11 | Christophe Dominici |
| FH | 10 | Frédéric Michalak |
| SH | 9 | Dimitri Yachvili |
| N8 | 8 | Thomas Lièvremont |
| OF | 7 | Olivier Magne | (substituted off) 57' |
| BF | 6 | Yannick Nyanga |
| RL | 5 | Jérôme Thion |
| LL | 4 | Fabien Pelous | (substituted off) 64' |
| TP | 3 | Pieter de Villiers | (substituted off) 50' |
| HK | 2 | Raphaël Ibañez | (substituted off) 60' |
| LP | 1 | Sylvain Marconnet |
Substitutions:
| HK | 16 | Dimitri Szarzewski | (substituted on) 60' |
| PR | 17 | Olivier Milloud | (substituted on) 50' |
| LK | 18 | Lionel Nallet | (substituted on) 64' |
| FL | 19 | Julien Bonnaire | (substituted on) 57' |
| SH | 20 | Jean-Baptiste Élissalde |
| CE | 21 | Ludovic Valbon | (substituted on) 72' |
| FB | 22 | Cédric Heymans |
Coach:
Bernard Laporte

| FB | 15 | Josh Lewsey |
| RW | 14 | Mark Cueto |
| OC | 13 | Jamie Noon |
| IC | 12 | Mike Tindall | (substituted off) 57' |
| LW | 11 | Ben Cohen |
| FH | 10 | Charlie Hodgson | (substituted off) 40' |
| SH | 9 | Matt Dawson | (substituted off) 57' |
| N8 | 8 | Martin Corry |
| OF | 7 | Lewis Moody |
| BF | 6 | Joe Worsley | (substituted off) 60' |
| RL | 5 | Danny Grewcock | (substituted off) 69' |
| LL | 4 | Steve Borthwick |
| TP | 3 | Julian White |
| HK | 2 | Steve Thompson | (substituted off) 60' |
| LP | 1 | Matt Stevens | (substituted off) 60' |
Substitutions:
| HK | 16 | Lee Mears | (substituted on) 60' |
| PR | 17 | Andrew Sheridan | (substituted on) 60' |
| LK | 18 | Simon Shaw | (substituted on) 69' |
| N8 | 19 | Lawrence Dallaglio |
| SH | 20 | Harry Ellis | (substituted on) 57' |
| FH | 21 | Andy Goode | (substituted on) 40' |
| FB | 22 | Tom Voyce | (substituted on) 57' |
Coach:
Andy Robinson

Notes:

- This was France's biggest victory against England since 1972.
- Florian Fritz's opening try was the quickest try scored in the Six Nations.

=== Week 5 ===
18 March 2006
13:30 GMT

| Italy | 10–13 | Scotland |
| Try: Mi. Bergamasco 5' c Con: Pez (1/1) 6'; Pen: Pez (1/1) 57' | Report | Try: Paterson 10' c Con: Paterson (1/1) 11'; Pen: Paterson (1/1) 77'; Drop: Ross (1/1) 39' |

Stadio Flaminio, Rome
Attendance: 24,062
Referee: Alain Rolland (Ireland)

| FB | 15 | Cristian Stoica | (substituted off) 22' |
| RW | 14 | Pablo Canavosio |
| OC | 13 | Gonzalo Canale |
| IC | 12 | Mirco Bergamasco |
| LW | 11 | Ludovico Nitoglia |
| FH | 10 | Ramiro Pez |
| SH | 9 | Paul Griffen | 12' to 20' |
| N8 | 8 | Josh Sole |
| OF | 7 | Maurizio Zaffiri | (substituted off) 53' |
| BF | 6 | Sergio Parisse |
| RL | 5 | Marco Bortolami |
| LL | 4 | Santiago Dellapè | (substituted off) 66' |
| TP | 3 | Martín Castrogiovanni | (substituted off) 54' |
| HK | 2 | Fabio Ongaro | (substituted off) 61' |
| LP | 1 | Salvatore Perugini |
Substitutions:
| HK | 16 | Carlo Festuccia | (substituted on) 61' |
| PR | 17 | Andrea Lo Cicero | (substituted on) 54' |
| LK | 18 | Carlo Del Fava | (substituted on) 66' |
| FL | 19 | Alessandro Zanni | (substituted on) 53' |
| SH | 20 | Simon Picone | (substituted on) 12' | (substituted off) 20' |
| FH | 21 | Rima Wakarua |
| WG | 22 | Ezio Galon | (substituted on) 22' |
Coach:
Pierre Berbizier

| FB | 15 | Hugo Southwell |
| RW | 14 | Chris Paterson |
| OC | 13 | Marcus Di Rollo |
| IC | 12 | Andrew Henderson |
| LW | 11 | Sean Lamont | (substituted off) 71' |
| FH | 10 | Gordon Ross | (substituted off) 61' |
| SH | 9 | Chris Cusiter | (substituted off) 8' |
| N8 | 8 | Simon Taylor |
| OF | 7 | Ally Hogg |
| BF | 6 | Jason White |
| RL | 5 | Scott Murray | (substituted off) 67' |
| LL | 4 | Nathan Hines |
| TP | 3 | Bruce Douglas | (substituted off) 54' |
| HK | 2 | Scott Lawson | (substituted off) 74' |
| LP | 1 | Gavin Kerr |
Substitutions:
| HK | 16 | Dougie Hall | (substituted on) 74' |
| PR | 17 | Craig Smith | (substituted on) 54' |
| LK | 18 | Alastair Kellock | (substituted on) 67' |
| FL | 19 | Jon Petrie |
| SH | 20 | Mike Blair | (substituted on) 8' |
| FH | 21 | Dan Parks | (substituted on) 61' |
| WG | 22 | Simon Webster | (substituted on) 71' |
Coach:
Frank Hadden

Notes:

- This was Scotland's highest finish in the Six Nations since 2001.

18 March 2006
15:30 GMT

| Wales | 16–21 | France |
| Try: Luscombe 31' c Con: S. Jones (1/1) 32'; Pen: S. Jones (2/2) 4', 25'; Henson (1/1) 55' | Report | Try: Szarzewski 48' m Fritz 72' c Con: Élissalde (1/2) 73'; Pen: Yachvili (2/2) 11', 38'; Élissalde (1/3) 78' |

Millennium Stadium, Cardiff
Attendance: 74,500
Referee: Chris White (England)

| FB | 15 | Lee Byrne | (substituted off) 40' |
| RW | 14 | Dafydd James |
| OC | 13 | Hal Luscombe |
| IC | 12 | Matthew Watkins |
| LW | 11 | Shane Williams |
| FH | 10 | Stephen Jones |
| SH | 9 | Mike Phillips |
| N8 | 8 | Alix Popham | (substituted off) 68' |
| OF | 7 | Martyn Williams |
| BF | 6 | Michael Owen |
| RL | 5 | Robert Sidoli | (substituted off) 74' |
| LL | 4 | Ian Gough |
| TP | 3 | Adam R. Jones |
| HK | 2 | T. Rhys Thomas | (substituted off) 42' |
| LP | 1 | Duncan Jones | (substituted off) 51' |
Substitutions:
| HK | 16 | Mefin Davies | (substituted on) 42' |
| PR | 17 | Gethin Jenkins | (substituted on) 51' |
| FL | 18 | Jonathan Thomas | (substituted on) 74' |
| FL | 19 | Dafydd Jones | (substituted on) 68' |
| SH | 20 | Andy Williams |
| FH | 21 | Nicky Robinson |
| CE | 22 | Gavin Henson | (substituted on) 40' |
Caretaker coach:
Scott Johnson

| FB | 15 | Thomas Castaignède | | (substituted off) 40' |
| RW | 14 | Aurélien Rougerie |
| OC | 13 | Florian Fritz |
| IC | 12 | Damien Traille |
| LW | 11 | Christophe Dominici |
| FH | 10 | Frédéric Michalak |
| SH | 9 | Dimitri Yachvili | | (substituted off) 43' |
| N8 | 8 | Thomas Lièvremont | | (substituted off) 26' | (substituted on) 35' | (substituted off) 50' |
| OF | 7 | Julien Bonnaire | | (substituted off) 55' |
| BF | 6 | Yannick Nyanga |
| RL | 5 | Jérôme Thion |
| LL | 4 | Fabien Pelous |
| TP | 3 | Pieter de Villiers |
| HK | 2 | Raphaël Ibañez | (yellow card) 25' | | | (substituted off) 43' |
| LP | 1 | Sylvain Marconnet | | (substituted off) 71' |
Substitutions:
| HK | 16 | Dimitri Szarzewski | | (substituted on) 26' | (substituted off) 35' | (substituted on) 43' |
| PR | 17 | Olivier Milloud | | (substituted on) 71' |
| LK | 18 | Lionel Nallet | | (substituted on) 55' |
| FL | 19 | Olivier Magne | | | | (substituted on) 50' |
| SH | 20 | Jean-Baptiste Élissalde | | (substituted on) 43' |
| CE | 21 | Ludovic Valbon |
| FB | 22 | Cédric Heymans | | (substituted on) 40' |
Coach:
Bernard Laporte

Notes:

- This was France's fourth consecutive victory at the Millennium Stadium.

18 March 2006
17:30 GMT

| England | 24–28 | Ireland |
| Try: Noon 1' m Borthwick 51' c Con: Goode (1/2) 51'; Pen: Goode (4/6) 33', 43', 68', 74' | Report | Try: Horgan (2) 6' m, 79' c Leamy 57' c Con: O'Gara (2/3) 58', 79'; Pen: O'Gara (3/5) 13', 32', 41' |

Twickenham Stadium, London
Attendance: 81,986
Referee: Nigel Whitehouse (Wales)

| FB | 15 | Tom Voyce |
| RW | 14 | Mark Cueto |
| OC | 13 | Jamie Noon | | 27' to 39' | | (substituted off) 40' |
| IC | 12 | Stuart Abbott |
| LW | 11 | Ben Cohen |
| FH | 10 | Andy Goode |
| SH | 9 | Harry Ellis | | (substituted off) 66' |
| N8 | 8 | Martin Corry |
| OF | 7 | Lewis Moody |
| BF | 6 | Joe Worsley |
| RL | 5 | Simon Shaw | (yellow card) 32' | (substituted off) 62' |
| LL | 4 | Steve Borthwick |
| TP | 3 | Julian White |
| HK | 2 | Lee Mears | | (substituted off) 62' |
| LP | 1 | Andrew Sheridan | | (substituted off) 68' |
Substitutions:
| HK | 16 | Steve Thompson | | (substituted on) 62' |
| PR | 17 | Perry Freshwater | | (substituted on) 68' |
| LK | 18 | Danny Grewcock | | (substituted on) 62' |
| N8 | 19 | Lawrence Dallaglio |
| SH | 20 | Matt Dawson | | (substituted on) 66' |
| FH | 21 | Dave Walder |
| CE | 22 | Mike Tindall | | (substituted on) 27' | (substituted off) 39' | (substituted on) 40' |
Coach:
Andy Robinson

| FB | 15 | Geordan Murphy |
| RW | 14 | Shane Horgan |
| OC | 13 | Brian O'Driscoll |
| IC | 12 | Gordon D'Arcy |
| LW | 11 | Andrew Trimble | (substituted off) 65' |
| FH | 10 | Ronan O'Gara |
| SH | 9 | Peter Stringer |
| N8 | 8 | Denis Leamy | | | (substituted off) 70' |
| OF | 7 | David Wallace | 16' to 26' |
| BF | 6 | Simon Easterby |
| RL | 5 | Paul O'Connell |
| LL | 4 | Malcolm O'Kelly | (substituted off) 53' |
| TP | 3 | John Hayes |
| HK | 2 | Jerry Flannery |
| LP | 1 | Marcus Horan |
Substitutions:
| HK | 16 | Rory Best |
| PR | 17 | Simon Best |
| LK | 18 | Donncha O'Callaghan | (substituted on) 53' |
| FL | 19 | Johnny O'Connor | (substituted on) 16' | (substituted off) 26' | (substituted on) 70' |
| SH | 20 | Eoin Reddan |
| FH | 21 | David Humphreys |
| FB | 22 | Girvan Dempsey | (substituted on) 65' |
Coach:
Eddie O'Sullivan

Notes:

- This was Ireland's second win in a row at Twickenham Stadium.
- Ireland won the Triple Crown.
- Ireland needed to win by 34 points to win the Championship.

== Scorers ==
Leading try scorers
| Rank | Name | Team | Tries |
|---|---|---|---|
| 1 | Mirco Bergamasco | Italy | 3 |
| 1 | Shane Horgan | Ireland | 3 |
| 3 | Mark Cueto | England | 2 |
| 3 | Florian Fritz | France | 2 |
| 3 | Cédric Heymans | France | 2 |
| 3 | Mark Jones | Wales | 2 |
| 3 | Sean Lamont | Scotland | 2 |
| 3 | David Marty | France | 2 |
| 3 | Aurélien Rougerie | France | 2 |
| 3 | Gareth Thomas | Wales | 2 |
| 3 | Mike Tindall | England | 2 |
| 3 | Chris Paterson | Scotland | 2 |

Leading point scorers
| Rank | Name | Team | Points |
|---|---|---|---|
| 1 | Ronan O'Gara | Ireland | 72 |
| 2 | Chris Paterson | Scotland | 57 |
| 3 | Charlie Hodgson | England | 44 |
| 3 | Ramiro Pez | Italy | 44 |
