= David Fitter =

- Born: David Edward Stanley Fitter; 27 January 1977 (age 49) Melbourne, Australia
- Height: 1.83 m (6 ft 0 in)
- Weight: 120 kg (18 st 13 lb)
- School: Scotch College, Melbourne
- Occupation: Medical Doctor

Rugby union career
- Position: Prop
Senior career
| Years | Team | Apps | (Points) |
| 2014− | ACT Brumbies, Western Force, | | |
| – | Australian Wallabies, | | |
| – | Australia A, London Irish | | |
International career
| Years | Team | Apps | (Points) |
| | Australia | 2 | (0) |
- Correct as of 22 August 2015

David Fitter (born 27 January 1977) is a retired Australian rugby union player who played for The Wallabies, Sydney University, Western Force, The Brumbies and London Irish.

Fitter played Australian rules football at Scotch College prior to switching to rugby. In June 2003, he joined the Australia ‘A’ squad playing Japan at the Prince Chichibu Memorial Stadium in Tokyo.

After retiring from rugby he returned to school at Melbourne University to study biomedicine and then postgraduate medicine.

He is now an Emergency Doctor.
