= Jérôme Thion =

France international rugby union player (born 1977)

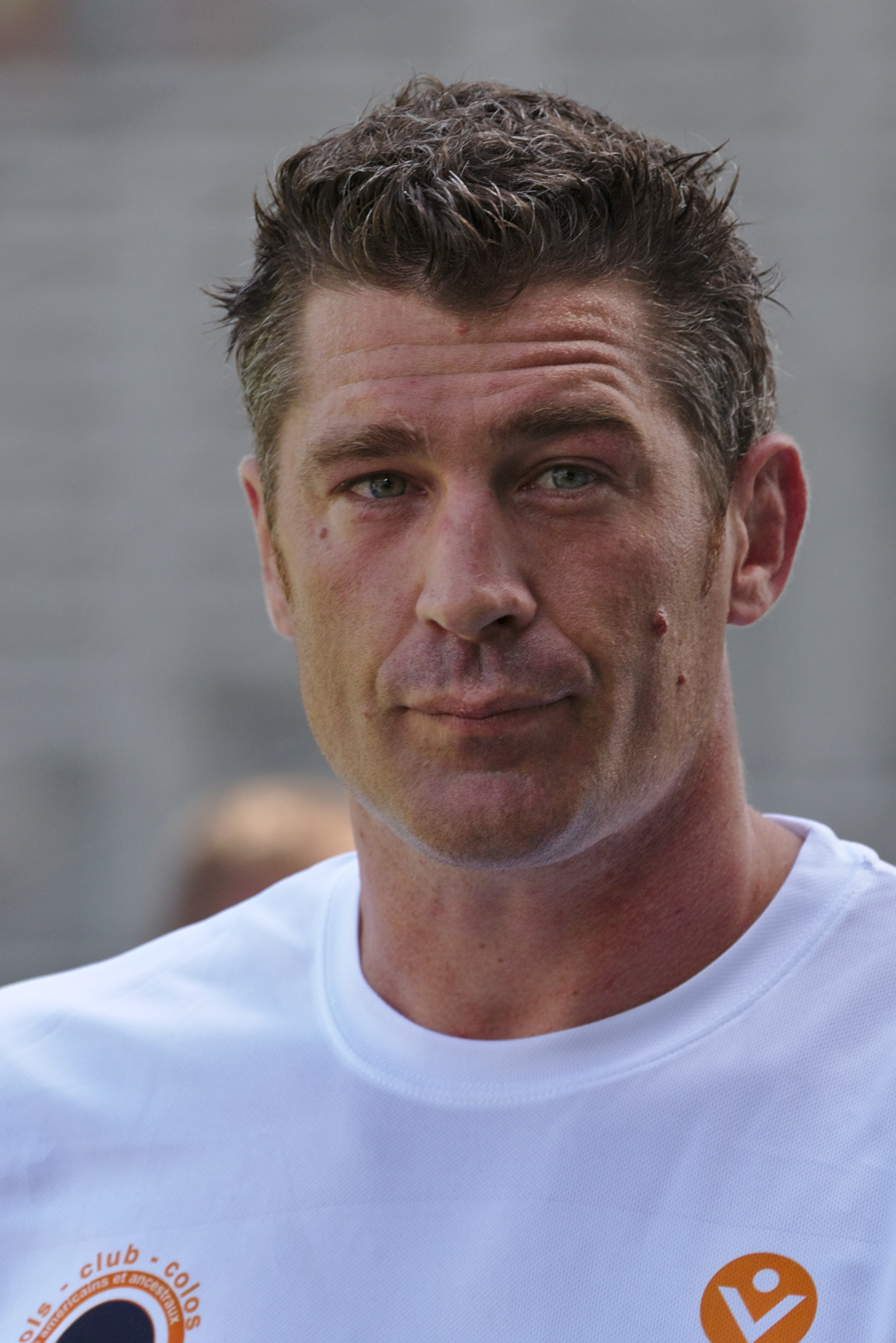
- Born: 2 December 1977 (age 48) Senlis, France
- Height: 1.99 m (6 ft 6 in)
- Weight: 120 kg (18 st 13 lb; 265 lb)

Rugby union career
- Position: Lock
Senior career
Years	Team	Apps	(Points)
1998-1999	Racing-Métro		
1999–2001	Montferrand		
2001-2003	Perpignan	24	(15)
2003–2013	Biarritz	243	(20)
International career
Years	Team	Apps	(Points)
2003-2011	France	54	(5)

Jérôme Thion (born 2 December 1977) is a French former professional rugby union footballer who played as a lock. He played for the France national team from 2003 to 2011, representing them at the 2003 and 2007 Rugby World Cups, as well as captaining them in three tests in late 2005. He was also a part of the side that won back-to-back Six Nations Championship titles in 2006 and 2007.

== Career ==
Before playing rugby union, Thion played basketball for Entente Osny Cergy Pontoise and Pau-Orthez. In fact, he made the switch from basketball to rugby late enough in his life that under current regulations of LNR, which operates France's professional rugby union league, he did not qualify as a "France-developed" player.

Thion's first club was AS Montferrand, where he stayed until 2001, then signing with USA Perpignan, where he stayed for two seasons, before moving to Biarritz, his current club.

He made his debut for France on 14 June 2003 in the first of two matches against Argentina. Argentina won the match 10–6 at José Amalfitani Stadium in Buenos Aires. He was in the starting line-up of the subsequent test against the Pumas a week later, which was again won by Argentina, although only by one point, with the final score being 33–32.

Thion played in the 31–23 loss to New Zealand at Jade Stadium in Christchurch on 28 June, as well as the 56–8 win over Romania on 22 August. Thion started for France in their last test before the 2003 Rugby World Cup in Australia. The game was played against England in Marseille, and was won by France by just one point, with the final score being 17–16. Thion was selected in France's 2003 World Cup squad. France made it to the semi-finals.

He earned international caps for France playing in the November tests against Australia, the All Blacks and Argentina. Thion played in every match during the 2005 Six Nations Championship, as well as a test against Australia in November. After the Australian test, Thion captained France in a test match against Canada, which France won 50–6. Thion captained France on two more occasions that year, the 43–8 win over Tonga and the 26–20 win over the Springboks.

In 2006, he played every match for France during the 2006 Six Nations Championship, which was won by France in the end. Biarritz made it to the 2005-06 Heineken Cup final, but were defeated by Munster. However, they went on to make it to the 2005-06 Top 14 final as well, where they beat Stade Toulousain to become the champions of France.

In 2007, he helped France retain their Six Nations title, defeating Scotland in the final match by 47-19 allowing France to pip Ireland to the title. Thion then played in the 2007 Rugby World Cup, where France were hosts. France finished four with semi-final defeat to England.
