= Ludovic Valbon =

France international rugby union player (born 1976)

Ludovic Valbon (born 22 May 1976, in Neuilly-sur-Seine) is a French rugby union footballer. He currently plays for CA Brive in the Top 14 championship. His usual position is as a centre or on the wing.

He has previous played for CA Bordeaux-Bègles Gironde until he moved to Brive. He made his Test debut for France in 2004 against the US Eagles. He was also included in France's mid-year Test squad for 2007 in the two game series against the All Blacks in New Zealand.
