= Jean-Baptiste Élissalde =

French rugby union player (born 1977)

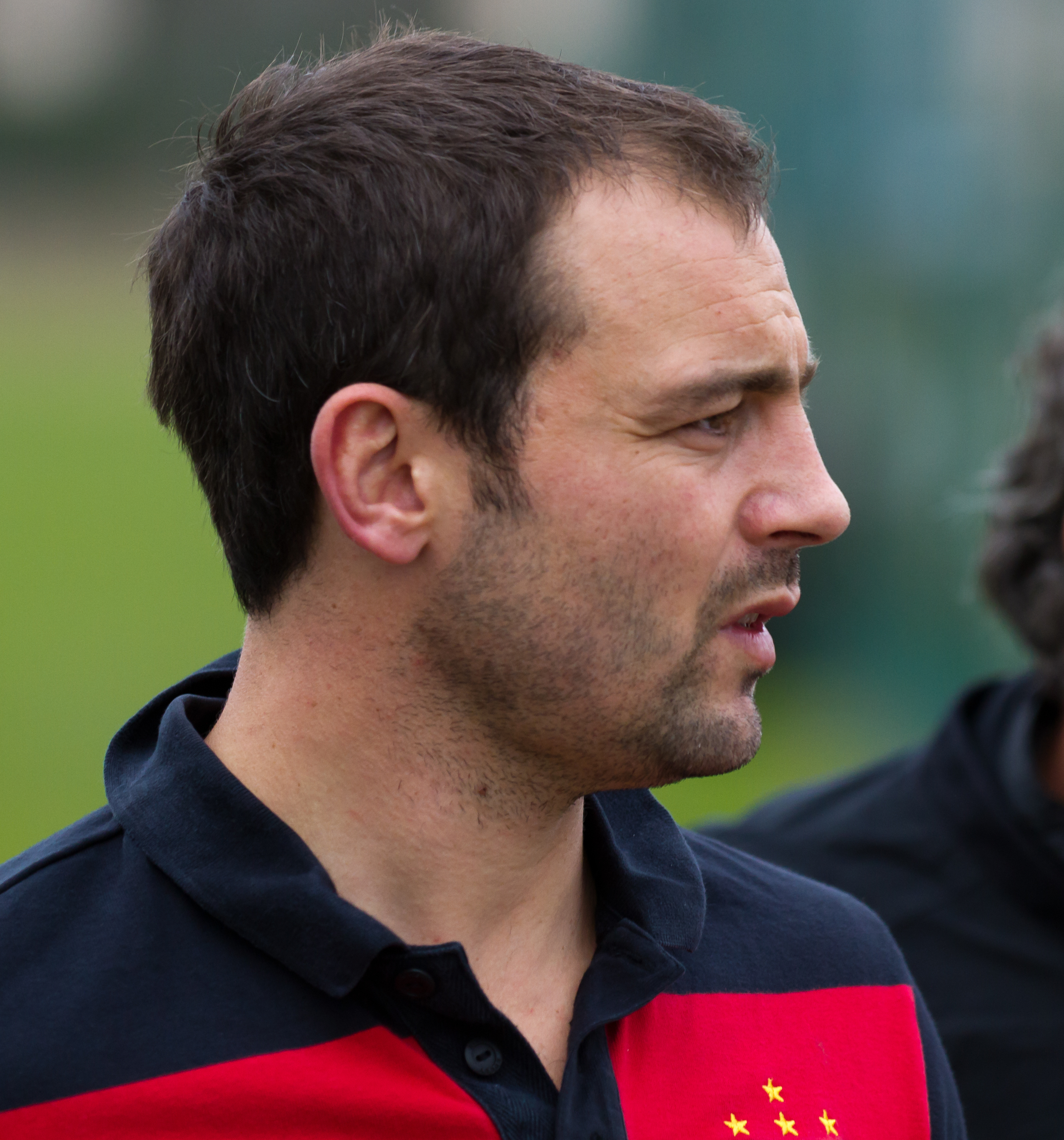
- Élissalde with Toulouse in 2012
- Born: 23 November 1977 (age 48) La Rochelle, France
- Height: 1.72 m (5 ft 8 in)
- Weight: 73 kg (11 st 7 lb)
- Notable relative: Jean-Pierre Élissalde (father)

Rugby union career
- Position(s): Scrum half, Fly-half
Senior career
Years	Team	Apps	(Points)
1997–2002	La Rochelle	103	(177)
2002–2010	Toulouse	190	(1,776)
2011	Toulouse	1	(0)
International career
Years	Team	Apps	(Points)
1997	France U21	(?)	(?)
1998–2010	French Barbarians	3	(?)
2002–2003	France A	3	(?)
2010	Barbarians	2	(9)
2000–2008	France	35	(214)
Coaching career
- Years: Team
- 2010–2017: Toulouse (backs)
- 2018–2019: France (backs)
- 2020–2023: Montpellier (defense)

Jean-Baptiste Élissalde (born 23 November 1977) is a former French rugby union player, playing either as a scrum-half or as a fly-half, and most recently defense coach for Montpellier in the Top 14.

== Biography ==
=== Early life ===
Born on 23 November 1977 in La Rochelle, France, Élissalde is a third generation French international. His maternal grandfather Laurent Bidart and his father Jean-Pierre Élissalde both represented France at international level. Élissalde began playing rugby with La Rochelle, where his father was a coach. He made his first appearance with the professional team in the 1997–8 season. Élissalde then gained caps with the France U21 team.

=== Toulouse ===
He played for La Rochelle until 2002 when La Rochelle dropped from the top tier championship and decided to go to Toulouse, where he initially had a hard time breaking into the senior squad, competing against the likes of Frédéric Michalak and Yann Delaigue. He then became the first choice scrum-half at Toulouse and was competing with Biarritz Olympique's Dimitri Yachvili for the No. 9 shirt in the French national team. Élissalde was a member of the Toulouse teams that won the Heineken Cup in 2005 and 2010, and the Top 14 winning team of 2008. In the 2005 Heineken Cup Final he scored three penalties to help his side defeat Stade Français.

=== International career ===
He made his international debut against Scotland in the 2000 Six Nations as a replacement for fly-half Gérald Merceron and went on to score his first international points later that year in a test against Romania with a try eight minutes after coming in, again for Merceron. Dropping to the France A side thus making no subsequent full international appearance until the 2003 Six Nations, he was unable to force his way into the 2003 French World Cup squad.

Élissalde bounced back from this disappointment with a strong showing in the 2004 Six Nations, making his first international start against Ireland at scrum-half (pairing with his club-mate Frédéric Michalak at fly-half) and scoring 36 points in his three starts, including a 24-point haul against Wales, to help France claim their second Grand Slam in three years. The 2006 Six Nations was also successful for both Élissalde and France with a Championship success and despite being unable to participate in the 2007 Six Nations due to injury, Élissalde was finally established ahead of Dimitri Yachvili in the French squad.

Élissalde went to the 2007 World Cup in good form, but was left on the bench for the opener against Argentina. Following a terrible display by his replacement Pierre Mignoni, he was restored as the French made it to the semi-finals. He scored a try and kicked 11 conversions for a tally of 27 points in an 87–10 thrashing against Namibia. He kicked the winning conversion in the quarter-final against New Zealand, a game which France won 20–18. Élissalde was limited to three appearances in the Six Nations in 2008, including the championship deciding loss to Wales in Cardiff. He gained the last of his 35 caps in November 2008 in a Test against the Pacific Islanders where he had to leave the pitch on a stretcher after 18 minutes when Napolioni Nalaga's high tackle left him unconscious.

=== Barbarians ===
Élissalde was selected to play for the Barbarians for their 2010 Summer tour alongside club-mates Cédric Heymans and Census Johnston. He played in non-cap tests against England and Ireland. Élissalde featured in both tests, scoring 6 points in a loss to England and 3 points in a victorious test against Ireland.

=== Retirement ===
After winning the Heineken Cup in 2010 with Toulouse, Jean-Baptiste Élissalde announced his retirement from playing rugby with France and his club. Élissalde took up a position with Toulouse as a backs coach, replacing Philippe Rougé-Thomas, working alongside head coach Guy Novès and forwards coach Yannick Bru, leading the club to its 18th domestic title in 2011.

In 2010, he briefly came out of retirement to be selected in the French Barbarians squad playing Tonga on 26 November, a match which was part of the French Barbarians' 30th anniversary celebrations. Élissalde started in the fly-half position and scored 3 points in what is considered his jubilee. The Barbarians lost 28–27.

In 2011 he once again came out of retirement as a World Cup joker when Jean-Marc Doussain was selected as a late addition to the French World Cup squad to replace the injured David Skrela and played a single minute in the home game against Agen as a scrum-half replacement to Nicolas Bézy, much to the fans' delight. As the Stade Toulousain retained their Domestic Championship title that year, Élissalde became a two-time French champion both as a player and as a coach (in addition to already being a three-time European champion and a two-time Six Nations champion as a player).

== Trivia ==
- His surname (Elizalde in Standard Basque, from eliza "church" and alde "side"), means "near the church" in Basque.
