= Lee Mears =

British Lions & England international rugby union player

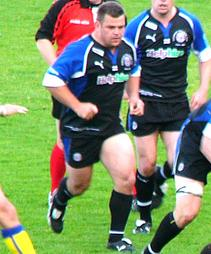
- Born: Lee Mears; 5 March 1979 (age 47) Torquay, England
- Height: 1.76 m (5 ft 9 in)
- Weight: 98 kg (15 st 6 lb)
- School: Paignton Community College; Colston's School

Rugby union career
- Position: Hooker
- Current team: Bath
Youth career
- Torquay Athletic
Senior career
| Years | Team | Apps | (Points) |
| 1998–2013 | Bath | 263 | (55) |
International career
| Years | Team | Apps | (Points) |
| 2005–2012 | England | 42 | (5) |
| – | British and Irish Lions | 4 | (5) |

Lee Mears (born 5 March 1979) is an English former professional rugby union player who played as a hooker. He played his club rugby for Bath from 1998 until his retirement in 2013. He also played for the England national team from 2004 to 2012; he earned 42 caps and played in two Rugby World Cups, and played for the British & Irish Lions on their 2009 tour to South Africa.

== Early years ==
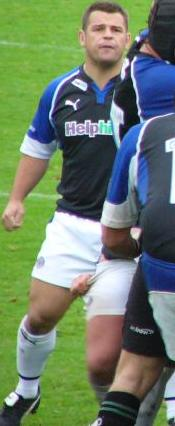
Mears in action for Bath

Mears first started playing rugby for the Torquay Athletic mini team. Then after playing at Paignton College, he went to Colston's School and came under the guidance of Andy Robinson and Alan Martinovic. He has played for Devon, and all the England age group teams. In 1997 he was a member of the unbeaten England U18 Schools team that toured Australia. He played in three world cup matches in New Zealand for England U21s.

== Senior team ==
Mears joined the Bath Academy in 1997 after leaving Colston's School. He managed to score on his first XV debut in a friendly against Saracens. Having made 268 Bath appearances over 16 seasons Mears had to retire following medical advice after routine cardiac screening.

== International career ==
Mears was selected for the 2004 Churchill Cup squad but did not play in any of the games. The next year he helped England win the 2005 Churchill Cup and after being named in the Autumn test squad, he made his test debut as a replacement against Samoa in November 2005. He came on as a replacement in the 2006 Six Nations Championship games against Wales, Italy and France, and earned a start against Ireland.

In 2007, Mears was selected in the England squad for the World Cup.

Mears was selected in the starting 15 against Scotland in the 2008 Six Nations. This came after several games trying to break into the side from the bench.

In June 2012, Mears announced his retirement from international rugby. He retired from all forms of rugby on 11 February 2013, following diagnosis of a heart condition.

Since retirement, he now runs a snack manufacturing company, specialising in budget potato crisps.
