= Ian Gough =

Wales international rugby union footballer

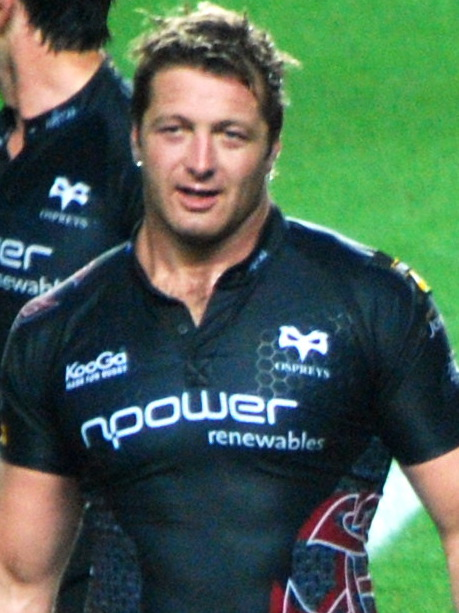
- Born: Ian Mervyn Gough; 10 November 1976 (age 50) Panteg, Torfaen, Wales
- Height: 6 ft 5 in (1.96 m)
- Weight: 18 st 10 lb (119 kg)
- School: Llantarnam

Rugby union career
- Position: Second row
Amateur team(s)
Years	Team	Apps	(Points)
1995	Toronto Nomads		
Senior career
Years	Team	Apps	(Points)
1998–2000	Pontypridd	57	(0)
1996–2003	Newport	139	(40)
2003–2007	NG Dragons	92	(25)
2007–2013	Ospreys	119	(10)
2013–2014	London Irish	13	(0)
2014–2015	NG Dragons	10	(0)
- Correct as of 10 May 2015
International career
Years	Team	Apps	(Points)
- Wales Youth
- Wales U-19
- Wales U-21
- Wales A
1998–2009	Wales	64	(5)
- Correct as of 14 November 2011

Ian Gough (born 10 November 1976) is a former Wales international rugby union rugby player. His usual position was lock forward. He made his debut for the Wales national rugby union team against South Africa in 1998, and was a regular thereafter, including playing in the 2006 Six Nations Championship, and the mid year series against Argentina. He also played within the Irish under-19 international team.

On 18 January 2010 he was named in the 35 man Wales national Squad for the 2010 Six Nations tournament.

He retired from professional rugby 5 September 2013, only to be tempted back with the opportunity to play for London Irish in the Aviva Premiership. In May 2014 Gough rejoined Newport Gwent Dragons. He announced his retirement from playing in May 2015.

Since April 2025, Ian now drives coaches for Bysiau Cwm Taf Valley Coaches Ltd in Whitland.

Ian has a son named Gabriel.

== Personal ==
In March 2015 Gough was cleared on appeal of assaulting his ex-girlfriend, Welsh glamour model Sophia Cahill.
