= Maurizio Zaffiri =

Italian rugby union flanker (born 1978)

Maurizio Zaffiri (born 12 January 1978 in L'Aquila) is an Italian rugby union flanker. He started playing with L'Aquila Rugby. He later moved to Gran Parma Rugby and then to Rugby Calvisano. He currently plays for L'Aquila Rugby. Zaffiri has been capped for the Italian national team, making his debut in 2000 against Fiji. He has 14 caps for his country.
