= Julien Bonnaire =

French rugby union player (born 1978)

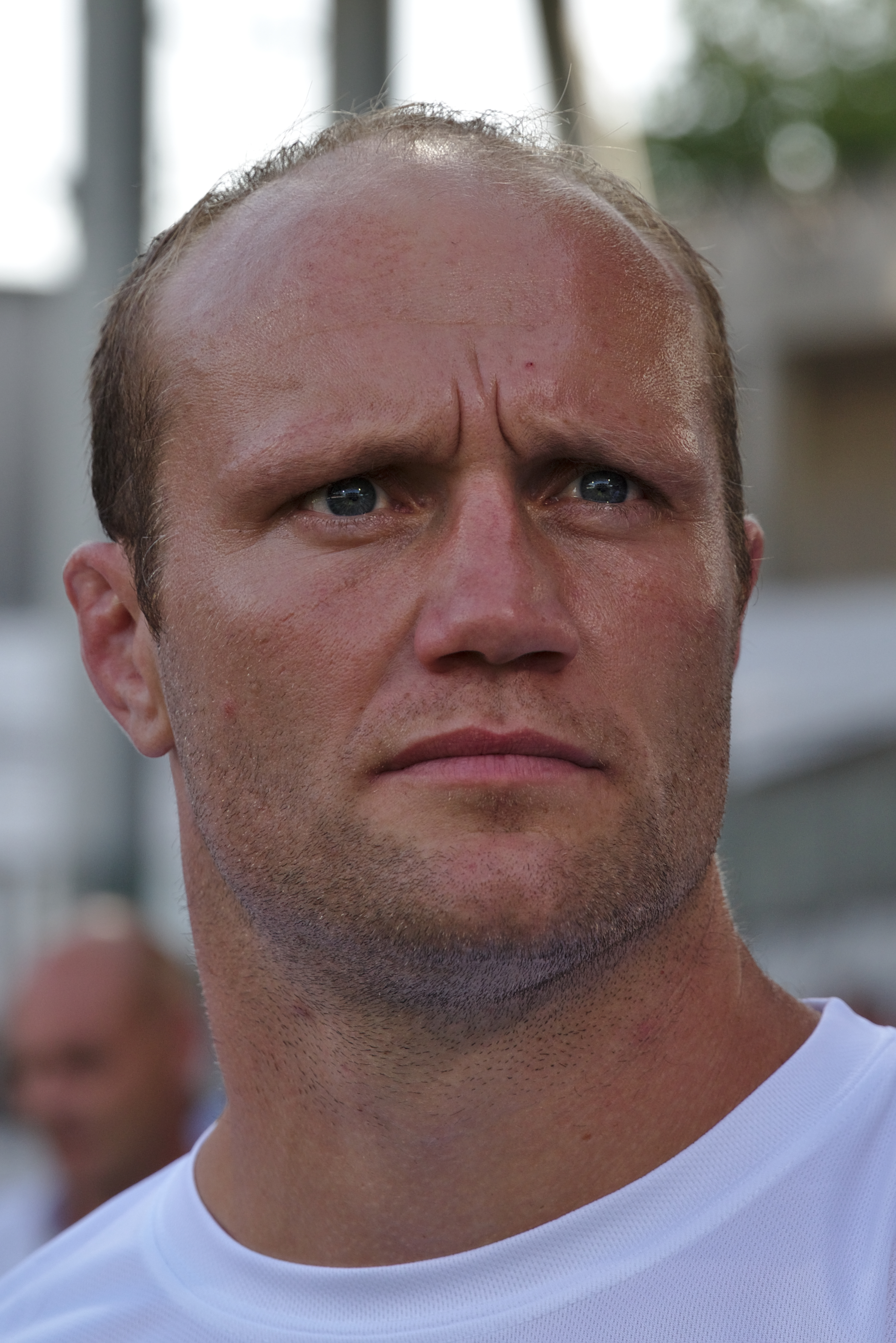
- Born: Julien Bonnaire; 20 September 1978 (age 48) Bourgoin-Jallieu, France
- Height: 6 ft 4 in (1.93 m)
- Weight: 100 kg (220 lb)

Rugby union career
- Position: Flanker / Number Eight
Senior career
Years	Team	Apps	(Points)
2001–2007	Bougoin-Jallieu	128	(70)
2007–2015	Clermont	191	(75)
2015–2017	Lyon	34	(15)
International career
Years	Team	Apps	(Points)
2004–2012	France	75	(30)
Coaching career
- Years: Team
- 2018–2019: France (Lineout)

Julien Bonnaire (French pronunciation: [ʒyljɛ̃ bɔnɛʁ]; born 20 September 1978) is a former French rugby union footballer, who played for CS Bourgoin-Jallieu in the Top 14 competition in France until the 2006–2007 season. He moved to ASM Clermont Auvergne during the summer of 2007. Bonnaire retired from International rugby after the 2012 Six Nations. However, he continued to play for club side, ASM Clermont Auvergne. Capping a decade of success between 2007 and 2017, before retiring and moving into coaching. He was most recently an assistant for France specialising in lineouts.

== Career ==
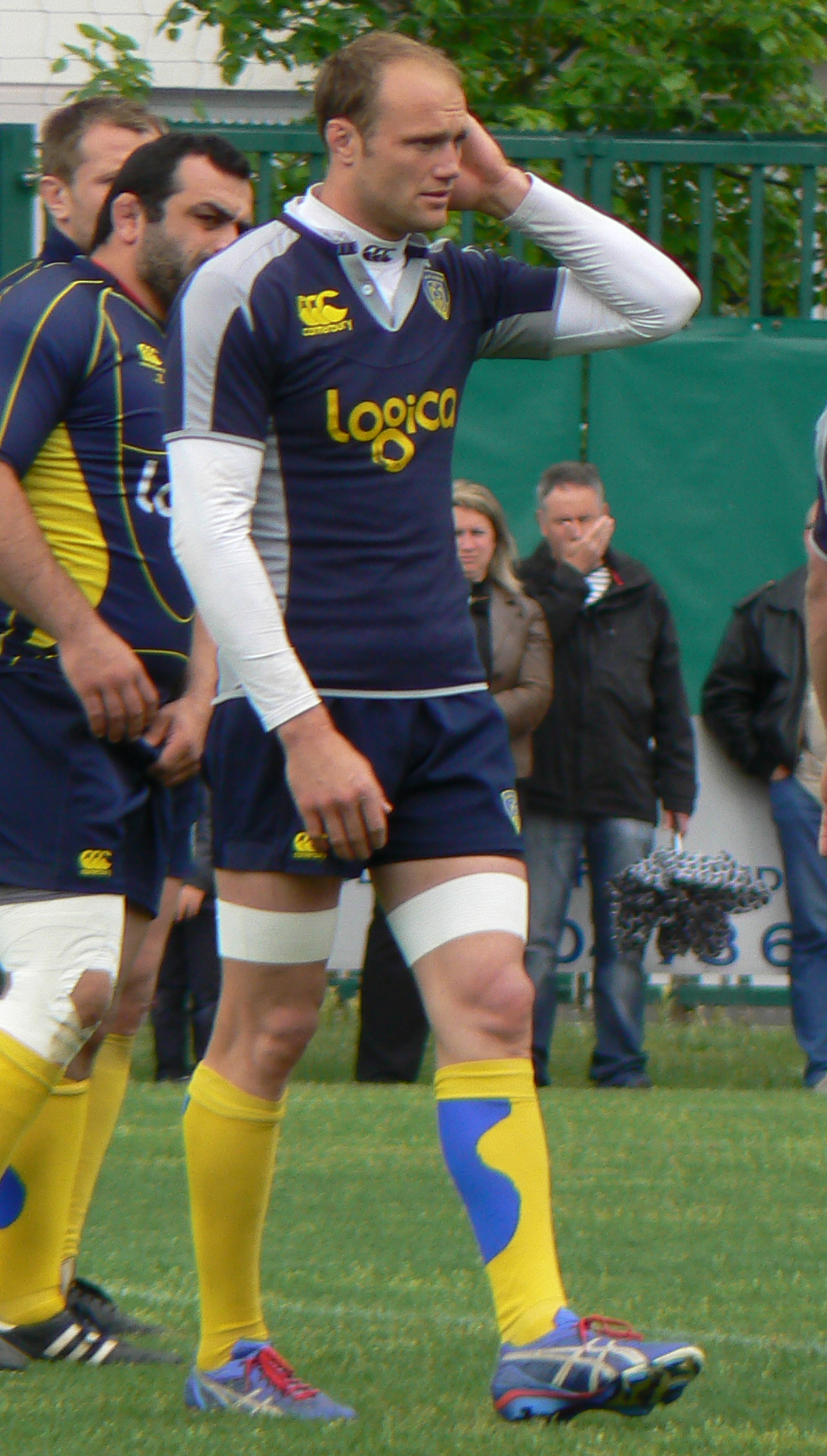
Bonnaire training with Clermont Auvergne

Bonnaire made his international debut for France in a match against Scotland on 21 March 2004 during the 2004 Six Nations Championship, as a replacement. He earned a further two caps for France that year, in tests against Australia and the All Blacks. The following year he was in the starting lineup for France in all five of their 2005 Six Nations Championship matches as well as the June/July tests against the South African Springboks and Australia. He scored his first try during the 18 June test against the Springboks.

He received another three test caps in November of that year. The following year he again played in every match at the 2006 Six Nations Championship, which France eventually won.

He played in the 2011 Rugby World Cup final.

Bonnaire retired from playing rugby professionally at the close of the top 14 season in 2017. He was appointed as a coach shortly before the start of the 2018 Six Nations, working under Jacques Brunel for the France national rugby union team.

At club level Bonnaire played in the final as Clermont won the Top 14 title in 2009–10.
