= Dimitri Szarzewski =

French rugby union player (born 1983)

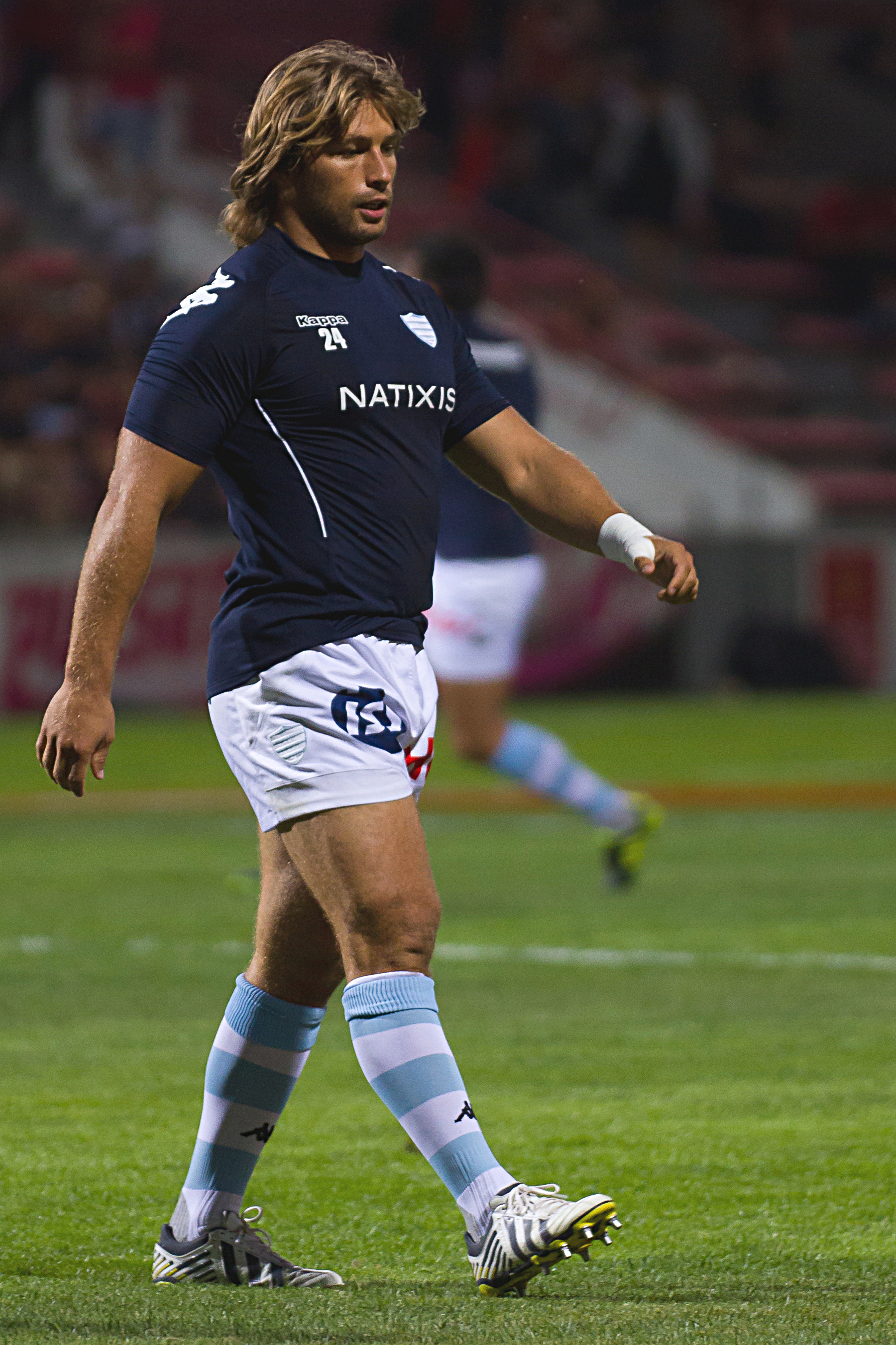
- Born: Dimitri Szarzewski; 26 January 1983 (age 43) Narbonne, France
- Height: 180 cm (5 ft 11 in)
- Weight: 98 kg (15 st 6 lb)

Rugby union career
- Position: Hooker
Senior career
Years	Team	Apps	(Points)
2002–2005	Béziers	57	(45)
2005–2012	Stade Français	131	(125)
2012–2019	Racing 92	128	(90)
- Correct as of 19 December 2019
International career
Years	Team	Apps	(Points)
2004–2015	France	83	(35)
- Correct as of 17 October 2015

Dimitri Szarzewski (French pronunciation: [dimiˈtʁi zaʁzɛfˈski]; born 26 January 1983) is a French former rugby union player. His usual position was at hooker, and also represented France internationally.

Szarzewski's first club was AS Béziers Hérault where he played from 2002 to 2004. He played five matches for Béziers during the 2002-03 Heineken Cup, as a substitute against Calvisano, Neath RFC and Leicester during 2002. He started the matches against Neath and Calvisano during the 2003 leg of the tournament.

The following season, Béziers played in the 2003-04 European Challenge Cup, as opposed to the Heineken Cup. He started against Connacht, and scored a try in the game, as well as playing in the matches against Grenoble and Bath. In 2004, he made his international debut for France on 10 July, in a match against Canada.

He played one match for France during the 2005 Six Nations Championship against Ireland. Although he did not play in any other Six Nations Championship games that year, he earned further caps for France with a match against Australia, as well as tests against Australia and South Africa. That season, Szarzewski signed with Stade Français, where he played five matches for them during the 2005-06 Heineken Cup.

Szarzewski played three matches during the 2006 Six Nations Championship, playing in the matches against Scotland, England and Wales. He scored a try in the 21–16 victory over Wales. Stade Français made it to the semi-finals of the 2005-06 Top 14 competition, but were defeated by Stade Toulousain 12 points to nine. He was subsequently included in France's squad for the mid-year tests against Romania and the Springboks.

He is married to Florence and has a son called Hugo and a daughter called Anna.

== Honours ==
(France) Stade Français

- Top 14: 2006–07

(France) Racing 92

- Top 14: 2015–16
