= Florian Fritz =

French rugby union player (born 1984)

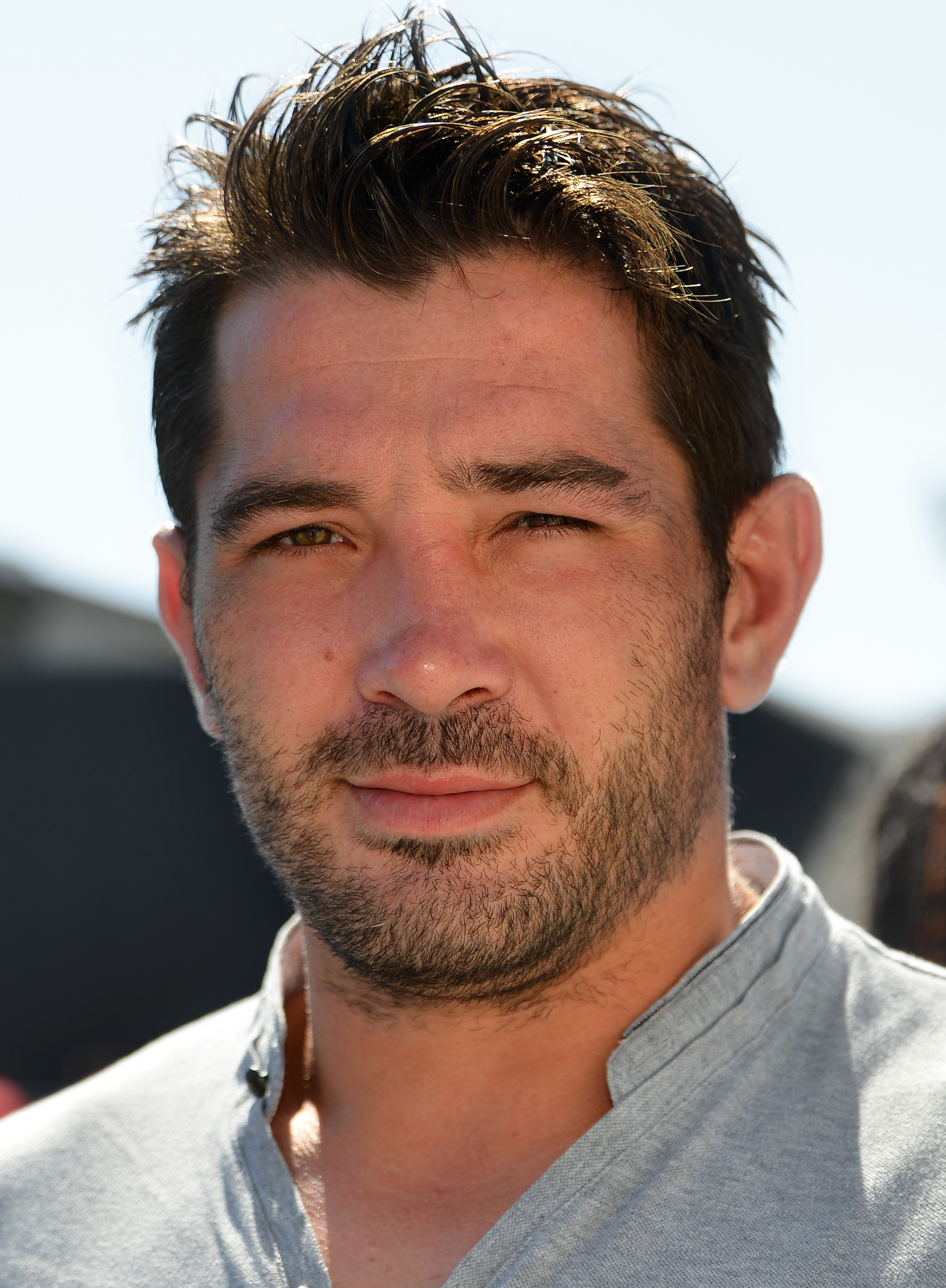
- Fritz in 2016
- Born: Florian Fritz; 17 January 1984 (age 42) Sens, France
- Height: 6 ft 1 in (1.85 m)
- Weight: 15 st 1 lb (96 kg)

Rugby union career
- Position: Centre
- Current team: Toulouse
Senior career
Years	Team	Apps	(Points)
2002–2004	Bourgoin	25	(10)
2004–2018	Toulouse	379	(355)
- Correct as of 29 April 2018
International career
Years	Team	Apps	(Points)
2005–2013	France	34	(24)

Florian Fritz (born 17 January 1984) is a French former rugby union rugby player. His usual position was in the centre. He played most of his career for Stade Toulousain in the Top 14 club competition in France. Fritz has also played for France.

He played his first Heineken Cup match during the 2003–04 tournament, scoring a try in his fifth match against Gloucester for CS Bourgoin-Jallieu. Fritz moved to Toulouse in 2004 and he scored two tries for Toulouse during their 2004-05 Heineken Cup campaign, with Toulouse eventually winning the tournament, defeating fellow French side, Stade Français 18 points to 12. He won the Heineken Cup for a second time in 2010, this time scoring a penalty and a drop goal in the final.

His good form at Toulouse was rewarded with selection in the France squad for the 2005 mid-year Test against South Africa. He went on to make his international debut against the Springboks on 18 June in Durban which resulted in a 30-all draw. That year, Fritz earned further international caps for France in matches against Australia in Marseille and South Africa in Paris. He played for France during the 2006 Six Nations Championship, playing his first Six Nations match against Scotland on 5 February. Although France lost that match 16 to 20, France went on to win the tournament. He was named in the French Rugby Squad for the Six Nations in 2009.

== International tries ==
#	Date	Venue	Opponent	Result (France-...)	Competition
1.	12 March 2006	Stade de France, Saint-Denis, France	England	31-6	Six Nations Championship
2.	18 March 2006	Millennium Stadium, Cardiff, Wales	Wales	21-16	Six Nations Championship
3.	25 September 2006	Stade de France, Saint-Denis, France	Argentina	27–26	Test Match
