= Sébastien Bruno =

French rugby union player (born 1974)

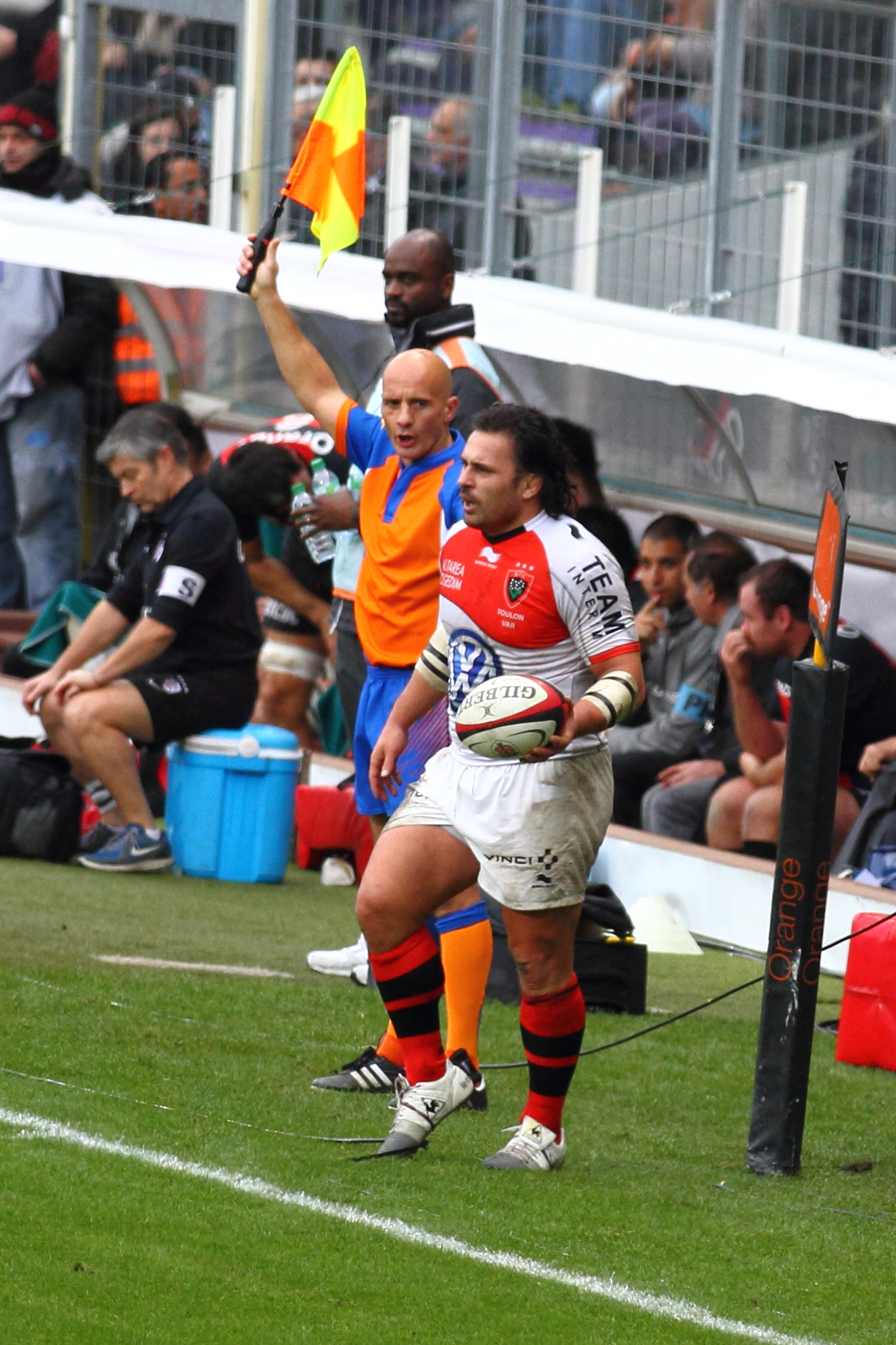
- Born: 26 August 1974 (age 52) Nîmes, France
- Height: 1.74 m (5 ft 8 1/2 in)
- Weight: 106 kg (16 st 10 lb)

Rugby union career
- Position: Hooker
Senior career
Years	Team	Apps	(Points)
1997–1999	Béziers	5	(0)
1999–2001	Pau	5	(0)
2001–2004	Béziers	57	(15)
2004–2009	Sale Sharks	107	(40)
2009–2014	Toulon	113	(5)
- Correct as of 14 September 2013
International career
Years	Team	Apps	(Points)
2002–2008	France	26	(20)
- Correct as of 5 July 2008
Coaching career
- Years: Team
- 2015–2018: Lyon (Forwards)
- 2018–2019: France (Scrum)

Sébastien Bruno (born 26 August 1974 in Nîmes, France) is a French rugby union footballer who plays as a hooker for Toulon and formerly for France. Born in Nîmes, Bruno joined Sale Sharks from French club Béziers, making his debut against Leicester Tigers in 2004. In the 2005–2006 season, Bruno played as a replacement in the final as Sale Sharks won their first ever Premiership title. He made his international debut in 2002 against Wales, and was selected as a member of France's 2007 Rugby World Cup squad held in France. Bruno returned to France for the 2009–10 Top 14 season, signing for Toulon.

Despite his sometimes inaccurate line-out throwing, Bruno is regarded as one of the strongest scrummaging hookers at the international level.

In May 2013 he started as Toulon won the 2013 Heineken Cup Final by 16–15 against Clermont Auvergne.

His son was born on New Year's Eve 2007.

Bruno is now (January 2018) the assistant coach at Lyon and one of three assistant coaches with the French national team.

== Honours ==
- Grand Slam : 2002
- Six Nations Championship : 2006
- European Challenge Cup : 2005
- Guinness Premiership : 2006
- Heineken Cup : 2013
