= T. Rhys Thomas =

Wales international rugby union footballer

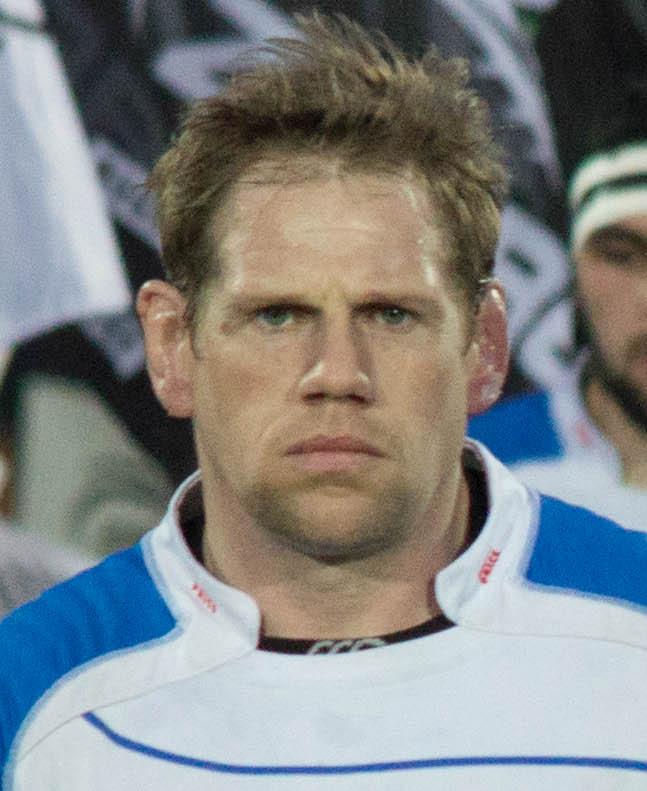
- Born: Thomas Rhys Thomas; 23 April 1982 (age 44) Abercynon, Wales
- Height: 183 cm (6 ft 0 in)
- Weight: 106 kg (16 st 10 lb)

Rugby union career
- Position: Hooker
Senior career
Years	Team	Apps	(Points)
2003–2012	Cardiff Blues	182	(50)
2012–2013	London Wasps	28	(15)
2013–2017	Newport Gwent Dragons	70	(30)
International career
Years	Team	Apps	(Points)
2005–2008	Wales	27	(5)

Thomas Rhys Thomas (born 23 April 1982 in Abercynon, Wales) is a former Wales International rugby player. His usual position was at hooker. Thomas made a try-scoring debut for the Cardiff Blues against Celtic Warriors on 27 December 2003. He made his Wales debut against USA Eagles on 4 June 2005.

Thomas left London Wasps at the end of the 2012–13 season and joined Newport Gwent Dragons. He retired from playing at the end of the 2016–17 season to take up a coaching role at the Dragons.
