= Johnny O'Connor =

Irish rugby union player

- Born: Jonathan O'Connor; 9 February 1980 (age 46) Galway, Ireland
- Height: 1.8 m (5 ft 11 in)
- Weight: 100 kg (16 st)
- School: Garbally College
- University: Setanta College

Rugby union career
- Position: Flanker
Amateur team(s)
Years	Team	Apps	(Points)
- Galwegians
–	Corinthians		
Senior career
Years	Team	Apps	(Points)
2000–2003	Connacht	27	(20)
2003–2007	Wasps	70	(45)
2007–2013	Connacht	110	(35)
- Correct as of 18 January 2013
International career
Years	Team	Apps	(Points)
2001–2008	Ireland A	9	(5)
2004–2006	Ireland	12	(5)
- Correct as of 18 March 2006

Johnny O'Connor (born 9 February 1980) is an Irish rugby union coach and former player. He is currently a strength and conditioning coach at his former club Connacht, having previously performed that role at football clubs Arsenal and Galway United.

During his playing career he was primarily a flanker. O'Connor spent most of his career with Irish provincial side Connacht, making over 100 appearances across two stints with the team. He also spent four seasons with English Premiership side Wasps in between. He also played amateur club rugby for Galwegians and Galway Corinthians.

O'Connor played for Ireland at full international level. He made his debut for in 2004 against South Africa. He made 12 appearances for Ireland, and was part of the 2006 team that won the Triple Crown. O'Connor was named 2005 Irish Rugby Union Players' Association player of the year.

O'Connor received his secondary education from Garbally College and is also a graduate of Setanta College.He now has a son named Jack who currently plays youth rugby
