= Andrew Sheridan =

British Lions & England international rugby union player

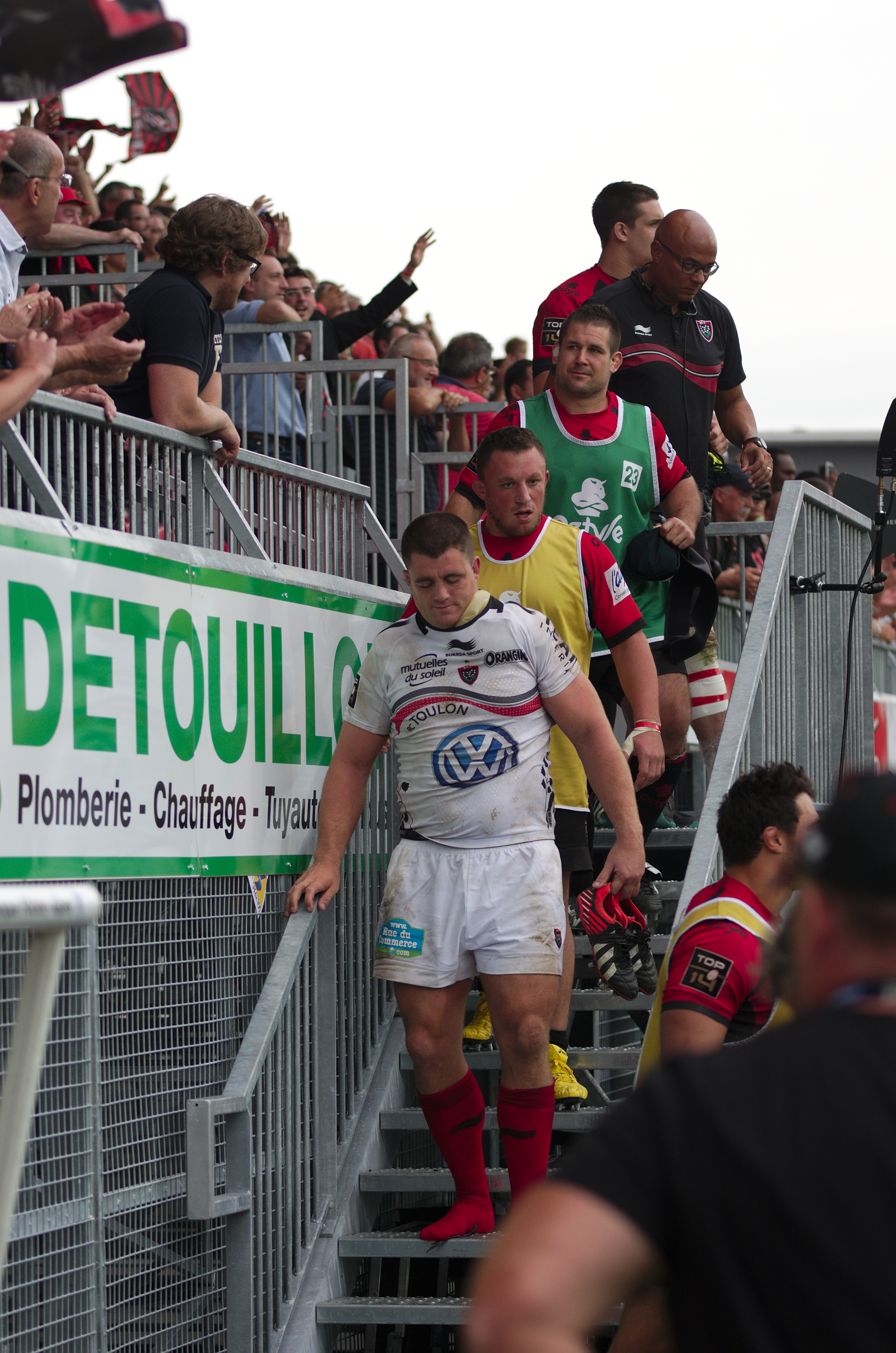
- Born: Andrew John Sheridan; 1 November 1979 (age 47) Bromley, England
- Height: 1.95 m (6 ft 5 in)
- Weight: 128 kg (20 st 2 lb; 282 lb)
- School: Dulwich College
- University: Royal Holloway, University of London

Rugby union career
- Position(s): Prop, Lock, Number-eight
Senior career
Years	Team	Apps	(Points)
1998–1999	Richmond	6	(0)
1999–2003	Bristol Shoguns	70	(25)
2003–2012	Sale Sharks	128	(40)
2012–2014	Toulon	44	(0)
International career
Years	Team	Apps	(Points)
2004–2011	England	40	(0)
2005, 2009	British & Irish Lions	2	(0)

Andrew John Sheridan (born 1 November 1979 in Petts Wood, Bromley, England) is a retired English rugby union player who played as a loosehead prop.

Sheridan is 1.95 m (6 ft 5 in) tall, which is unusually tall for a prop, and weighs 128 kg (20 st 2 lb; 282 lb). He is known for his great physical strength – he is a near-elite class powerlifter and able to bench press 225 kilograms (35 st 6 lb; 496 lb) and squat 275 kilograms (43 st 4 lb; 606 lb).

Sheridan announced his retirement from rugby in September 2014, due to a series of neck injuries.

== Domestic career ==
=== Early career ===
Born on 1 November 1979 in Petts Wood, Bromley, England, Sheridan started playing rugby union at the age of nine with Old Elthamians, where he played for five years. In 1991, he went to Dulwich College and there he worked his way through the Surrey age group teams and was capped by both the England U16 and U18 Group Schools teams as a lock.

He joined Richmond in the 1998–99 season and as they folded he won a place in the England U21 squad that played in the 1999 SANZAR tournament in Argentina.

=== Bristol and positional change ===
On his return from the SANZAR tournament he joined Bristol Shoguns, where he made around 80 appearances. His physique also caused problems; slightly short for a lock, he was also too heavy to be lifted in the line-out (a key area of second row play), meaning that if he played there, a tall back row forward (such as Dean Ryan) had to fill in; he was also not mobile enough to play in the back row himself; as a result it was decided to switch him to loosehead prop, despite his being very tall for that position. Sheridan was switched from lock to loosehead prop by New Zealander Peter Thorburn while at Bristol. He showed his versatility by also playing at Number 8.

=== Sale Sharks ===
After Bristol were relegated in the 2002–03 season, Sheridan joined Sale. In his first season at Sale, Sheridan played in the final of the 2004 Powergen Cup. Sheridan started for Sale as they defeated Pau in the final of the 2004–05 European Challenge Cup. Sheridan helped Sale Sharks to top the League in the 2005–06 season. An injury sustained earlier in the season meant Sheridan could not play in the final, as Sale defeated the Leicester Tigers to become Premiership champions for the first time.

=== Toulon ===
In 2012, he signed for French 14 club Toulon. In May 2013 he started as Toulon won the 2013 Heineken Cup Final by 16–15 against Clermont Auvergne.

== International career ==
=== Early international career and debut ===
In 2000 he was a squad member on England's tour to South Africa. During 2001/02 Sheridan played for England A against France A and Ireland A. In 2003 Sheridan was selected to represent England A at the 2003 Churchill Cup in Canada, as well as fixtures against the US and Japan. In December 2003, he played for the England XV that took on the Barbarians immediately following England's 2003 Rugby World Cup success. He finally won his first cap for England in November 2004, coming on as a replacement against Canada.

=== 2005 Lions Tour ===
He was somewhat controversially selected for the 2005 Lions tour of New Zealand, as many felt with only one cap to his name he was unlikely to feature heavily. On the 2005 tour, he was sent to the sin-bin after attempting to punch Luke McAlister following a clash of heads in the game against New Zealand Māori. Sheridan did not feature in the Test series.

=== First start for England ===
However, he established his reputation later that year in England's November Test against Australia, playing the main role in out-classing the Australian front row. Neither of his opposite numbers finished the match. First, Al Baxter proved unable to deal with Sheridan's power, and was eventually sin-binned late in the second half for collapsing a scrum after being warned for repeated scrum violations. Shortly afterwards, Matt Dunning, who was forced to move opposite Sheridan, was stretchered off after a scrum with what was feared to be a serious neck injury; however, scans showed no structural damage to Dunning's neck. Due to the sin-binning and Dunning's injury, the referee ordered uncontested scrums for the last 10 minutes of the match. He faced Carl Hayman of the All Blacks the next Saturday, who gave him a tough time at the scrum by scrumming very low, negating Sheridan's raw power.

=== 2006 injury ===
During a 23–21 victory over South Africa on 20 November 2006, Sheridan suffered a broken right ankle and ligament damage. The injury ruled him out for the rest of the 2006/07 season.

=== 2007 Rugby World Cup ===
He won 'Man of the match' against Australia in the Quarter final of the 2007 Rugby World Cup. Sheridan played the full 80 minutes in the 2007 Rugby World Cup Final.

=== 2009 Lions Tour ===
Sheridan was included in the squad for the 2009 British & Irish Lions tour to South Africa. Sheridan played in two Tests, starting the third and final Test.

== Outside rugby ==
In 2010, Sheridan recorded and released an acoustic rock album, entitled "Where We Go From Here". The acoustic album features Andrew on guitar, along with piano, drum and vocal accompaniment, and was recorded at the local Cotyso Studios after Sheridan's wife contacted the owner.
