= Yannick Nyanga =

France international rugby union player (born 1983)

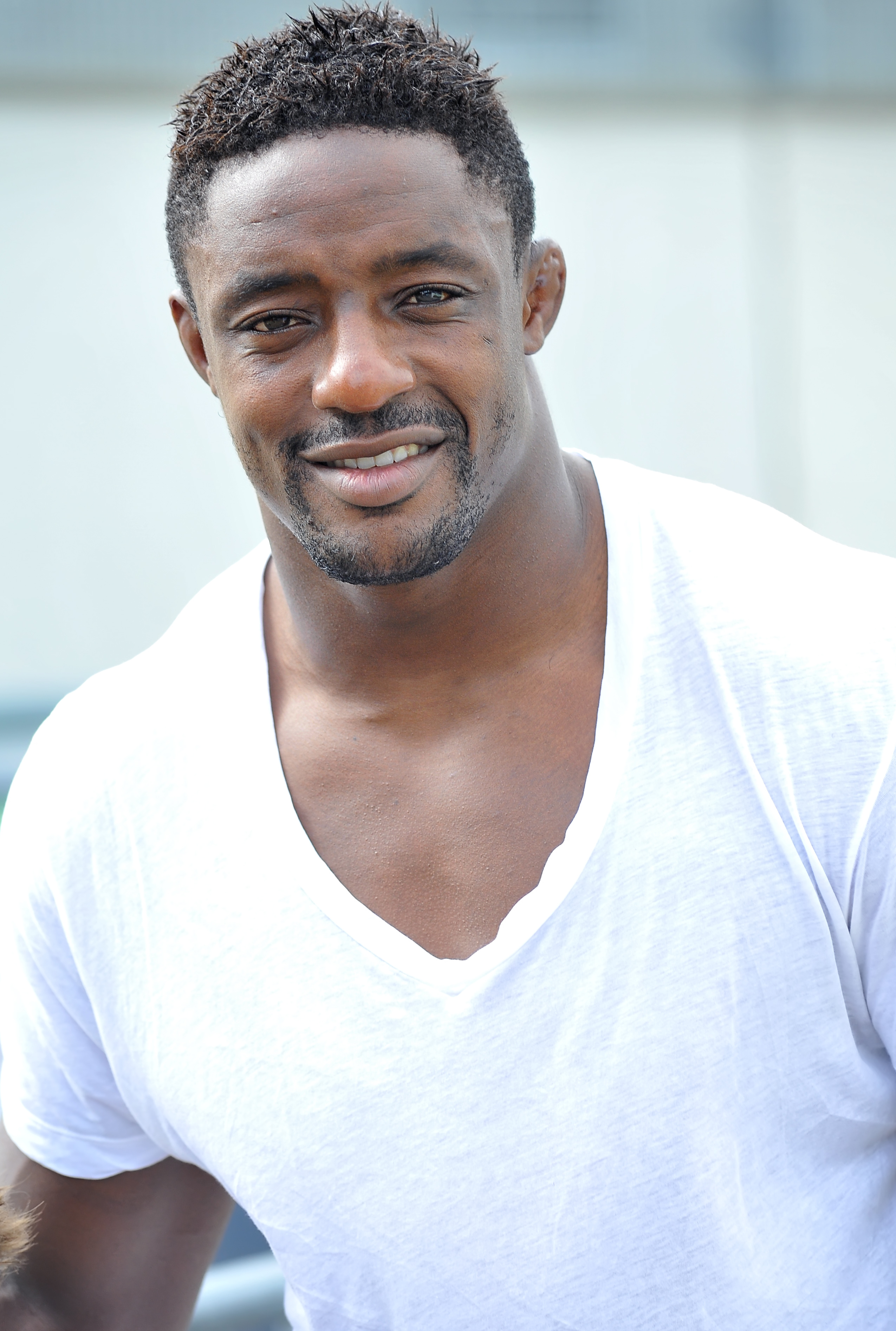
- Nyanga in 2013
- Born: 19 December 1983 (age 42) Kinshasa, Zaire
- Height: 1.87 m (6 ft 2 in)
- Weight: 96 kg (212 lb)

Rugby union career
- Position: Flanker
Senior career
Years	Team	Apps	(Points)
1998–2005	AS Béziers	57	(35)
2005–2015	Toulouse	257	(140)
2015–2018	Racing 92	78	(40)
- Correct as of 12 May 2018
International career
Years	Team	Apps	(Points)
2004–2015	France	46	(30)

Yannick Nyanga (born 19 December 1983 in Kinshasa, Zaire) is a former professional rugby union player who played as a flanker for Racing 92 and France, and is also known for his long tenure at Toulouse. He was a part of the victorious French team of the 2006 Six Nations Championship.

Nyanga plays at flanker in the style of a classic carrier with explosive pace from the scrum and excellent ability to support backs in later phases of play and good leg muscles to drive through the tackle, although being relatively light for a back row forward he can contain larger and more physical opposite numbers in rucks and mauls.

== Career ==
Nyanga joined AS Béziers in 1998. Nyanga received his first cap for France against the USA in France's 2004 tour of North America, making his debut in the 39 to 31 victory over the USA in Hartford. Following his first match for France, he played against Canada in Toronto, which France also won, 47 points to 13.

In 2005 he established himself firmly in France's regular line-up. After holding a reserve position in France's opening wins over Scotland and England during the 2005 Six Nations, he was called up into the starting line-up for the remainder of the tournament; playing Wales, Ireland and Italy. France lost only the one match; against eventual winners Wales.

Following the Six Nations he was included in France's touring squad for the mid-year. France left for South Africa, where they played the Springboks in a two test series; drawing the first, and losing the second. He was also capped against the Wallabies in Brisbane, which France also lost, 27 to 31. Following Béziers' relegation to Rugby Pro D2, Nyanga was signed by top club the then Heineken Cup champions Stade Toulousain for the upcoming season.

Nyanga was then capped another three times at the end of the year, in the win over Australia in Marseille, Tonga in Toulouse, as well as the 50 to six victory over Canada in Nantes, though he was partly rested, used as a reserve. He played in all of France's 2006 Six Nations the following year, which France eventually went on to win.

Toulouse finished third on the ladder for the 2005-06 Top 14, though they defeated Stade Français in the semi-finals to gain a place in the final. Toulouse lost the match to Biarritz 40 to 13. With consistent form, he was regarded by many pundits as an automatic selection for the French 2007 Rugby World Cup squad, and he was indeed named to the RWC squad.

Nyanga shares the cover of the French version of the EA Sports game Rugby 08 with All Blacks captain Richie McCaw.

== International tries ==
#	Date	Venue	Opponent	Result (France-...)	Competition
1.	19 March 2005	Stadio Flaminio, Rome, Italy	Italy	56–13	Six Nations Championship
2.	18 June 2005	Kings Park, Durban, South Africa	South Africa	30–30	Test match
3.	25 February 2006	Stade de France, Saint-Denis, France	Italy	37–12	Six Nations Championship
4.	27 September 2007	Stade Vélodrome, Marseille, France	Georgia	64–7	2007 Rugby World Cup
5.	20 November 2012	Grand Stade Lille Métropole, Lille, France	Argentina	39–22	Test match

== Honours ==
(France) Stade Toulousain

- Top 14: 2010–11, 2011–12
- Heineken Cup/European Rugby Champions Cup: 2010

(France) Racing 92

- Top 14: 2015–16

France

- Six Nations Championship: 2006
