= Cédric Heymans =

French rugby union player (born 1978)

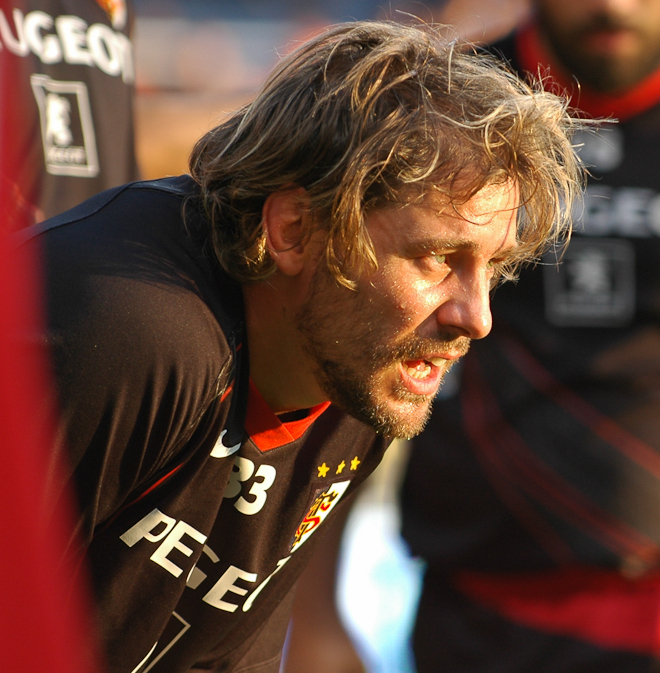
- Heymans with Toulouse in 2008
- Born: Cédric Heymans; 20 July 1978 (age 48) Brive-la-Gaillarde, France
- Height: 1.80 m (5 ft 11 in)
- Weight: 90 kg (14 st 2 lb)

Rugby union career
- Position(s): Wing, Full-back
Youth career
- 1993-1996: Brive
Senior career
Years	Team	Apps	(Points)
1996-1997	Brive		
1997-2001	Agen		
2001-2011	Toulouse	260	(435)
2011-2013	Bayonne	34	(11)
- Correct as of 30 March 2013
International career
Years	Team	Apps	(Points)
2000-2011	France	59	(8016t)
- Correct as of 8 October 2011
Coaching career
- Years: Team
- 2013–2015: Toulouse (U18)

Cédric Heymans (born 20 July 1978) is a French former rugby union footballer who played mainly as a wing or a full-back for French Top 14 club Toulouse and the France national team.

Known for his pace and his footwork, he started his club career with Brive where he won the Heineken Cup in 1997 before moving to Agen, where he stayed four seasons. He then moved to Toulouse in 2001 and won the Heineken Cup three times and the Top 14 twice. After ten years spent with the most successful club in France, he played two seasons for Bayonne before retiring in 2013.

Heymans scored 16 tries for the France national team within 59 caps. He won the Six Nations Championship three times, including one Grand Slam in 2004.

== Biography ==
Cédric Heymans was born on 20 July 1978 in Brive-la-Gaillarde, Corrèze. He started rugby in Meyssac, his hometown near Brive-la-Gaillarde, and then moved to French elite club Brive later.

Heymans made his debut for France in a match against Italy in Paris as a reserve during the 2000 Six Nations Championship. He made one other appearance for France that year, starting in a match against Romania in Bucharest.

In 2002, he started in two subsequent matches for the national side later that year, in the 30–10 win over South Africa in Marseille as well as the draw against the All Blacks in Paris. In 2004, he started against the United States, and was a reserve in a subsequent match against Canada. He received a further three national caps that year, starting in the win over Australia, as well as in the losses to Argentina and the All Blacks.

Heymans earned 8 caps for France during 2005, playing in the 2005 Six Nations Championship matches against Ireland and Italy as well as subsequent matches against the Springboks, Australia and Canada. In 2006, he played in three tests for France during the 2006 Six Nations Championship, as well as the 2006 mid-year rugby tests against Romania and the Springboks.

Heymans was the only person to have won the Heineken Cup on four occasions, having won it with Brive in 1997 and then with Toulouse three times in 2003, 2005 and 2010. However after the 2017–18 Champions Cup this record was equalled by Isa Nacewa, Johnny Sexton and Devin Toner as four time winners. He is also the youngest player to be involved in a final.

In 2010, he was selected in the French Barbarians squad to play Tonga on 26 November. After missing out on selection for the 2011 Six Nations Championship, Heymans was named in the French squad for the 2011 Rugby World Cup.

== Personal life ==
Heymans and his wife Justine have three children.

He currently works as a commentator and pundit for Canal+, and as a chief commercial officer for French fruit manufacturing company and Brive sponsor Andros as well.

== Honours ==
=== Brive ===
- Heineken Cup: 1996–97

=== Toulouse ===
- Heineken Cup: 2002–03, 2004–05, 2009–10
- Top 14: 2007–08, 2010–11

=== France ===
- Six Nations Championship: 2004 (Grand Slam), 2006, 2007
