= 2023 Rugby World Cup bids =

Three bids to host the 2023 Rugby World Cup (RWC2023) were submitted to World Rugby by the June 2017 deadline, with France selected on 15 November 2017 ahead of Ireland and South Africa. Italy withdrew its bid in September 2016, while Argentina and the United States initially expressed interest but ultimately decided against a formal bid. RWC2023 will be France's first time as sole host, having been principal host in 2007, co-host in 1991, and subsidiary host in 1999.

== Schedule ==
In 2010, it was reported that World Rugby might select the hosts for the 2023 and 2027 at the same time, as they did with the 2015 and 2019 tournaments. Later this idea was dropped. The bidding schedule was as follows:

Date	Event
14 May – 15 June 2015	Unions submit an expression of interest to World Rugby
3 July 2015	World Rugby confirms bidders
May 2016	World Rugby releases tender documentation
1 September 2016	Deadline for unions to confirm their intent to tender a bid
1 November 2016	Start of candidate phase for unions that meet the criteria outlined
1 June 2017	Deadline to submit detailed bid documents to World Rugby
25 September 2017	Bid presentations at World Rugby council meeting
31 October 2017	Recommendation of World Rugby council based on the Evaluation report
15 November 2017	World Rugby announces host for the 2023 Rugby World Cup

The bidding process formally kicked off on 14 May 2015. World Rugby held a meeting with five potential Rugby World Cup 2023 hosts on 6 May 2015 in London that was attended by representatives from Ireland, Italy, South Africa, France and the United States. Apart from the U.S., the countries attending had all previously publicly announced their interest to host the 2023 Rugby World Cup.

On 3 July 2015 World Rugby confirmed interest from the following four nations by the deadline of 15 June 2015:

- France
- Ireland
- Italy (withdrew bid on 28 September 2016)
- South Africa

=== Confirmed bidders ===
==== South Africa ====
Locations of the 8 stadia provisionally included in South Africa's bid.

South Africa was considered one of the frontrunners to host the 2023 competition, having hosted the 1995 tournament and bid unsuccessfully for the right to host the 2011, 2015, and 2019 tournaments.

In April 2016 the South African government banned its own rugby union from bidding to stage the 2023 World Cup over its failure to provide enough opportunities for black players. SA Rugby sought urgent talks with sports minister Fikile Mbalula in an effort to get its ban lifted in time for it to bid for the Rugby World Cup 2023. Jurie Roux, the chief executive of SA Rugby stated "There is no question that we have more work to do and we could be moving faster, but our sport has undergone a major overhaul in the past two or three years and we have definitely made great progress."

South Africa confirmed the bid on 9 May 2017 after the ban was lifted. There are optimistic projections of a R27 billion injection to the local economy by hosting the event, with a focus on eight stadiums across seven cities.

Stadium	Location	Capacity	Matches
FNB Stadium	Soweto, Johannesburg	94,736	Pool Matches, Quarter Finals, Final
Ellis Park Stadium	Johannesburg	62,567	Pool Matches, Quarter Final, Semi Final, Bronze Medal Match
Cape Town Stadium	Cape Town	55,000	Pool Matches, Quarter Finals, Semi Final
Moses Mabhida Stadium	Durban	54,000	Pool Matches, Quarter Finals
Loftus Versfeld Stadium	Pretoria	51,762	Pool Matches
Nelson Mandela Bay Stadium	Port Elizabeth	48,000	Pool Matches
Free State Stadium	Bloemfontein	46,000	Pool Matches
Mbombela Stadium	Nelspruit	40,929	Pool Matches

==== Ireland ====
The Irish Government and the Northern Ireland Executive, together with the Irish Rugby Football Union, formally announced on 5 December 2014 their intentions to launch a bid to host the event. Dick Spring, former Tánaiste and Ireland rugby player, and Chair of Ireland's Rugby World Cup 2023 bid, stated in May 2015 that Ireland already had received pledges of support from 40% of World Rugby's board's 27 votes. Ireland's bid included both rugby and Gaelic games grounds. The 82,000 capacity GAA stadium Croke Park would host the final, while other newly redeveloped GAA stadia such as Casement Park, Fitzgerald Stadium, MacHale Park and Páirc Uí Chaoimh would be part of the bid. In July 2017, emergency legislation was passed by the Oireachtas to grant the Minister for Transport, Tourism and Sport the explicit statutory authority to make the financial guarantees which Rugby World Cup Limited required.

Locations of the 12 stadia provisionally included in Ireland's bid.

On 15 November 2016, 12 stadia were announced as being part of the bid. The provisional list included Ireland's home stadium, Aviva Stadium, the home grounds of Leinster, Munster and Ulster, and eight GAA grounds, with two of these from each province. Some sites, such as Páirc Uí Chaoimh and Casement Park, were then undergoing renovations or expansions. Their planned capacities, as were listed on the IRFU's website, are provided.

Stadium	Owner	Location	Capacity	Match Category
Croke Park	GAA	Dublin (Drumcondra)	82,300	Opening match, pool games, quarter-final & final
Lansdowne Stadium	IRFU; FAI	Dublin (Ballsbridge)	51,700	Pool games, quarter-final, semi-final
Páirc Uí Chaoimh	Cork GAA	Cork	45,770	Pool games, quarter-final, semi-final
Fitzgerald Stadium	Kerry GAA	Killarney	43,180	Pool games, quarter-final
Casement Park	Antrim GAA	Belfast	34,186	Pool games
Pearse Stadium	Galway GAA	Galway	26,197	Pool games
MacHale Park	Mayo GAA	Castlebar	38,000	Pool games
Thomond Park	IRFU	Limerick	26,987	Pool games
Nowlan Park	Kilkenny GAA	Kilkenny	27,800	Pool games
RDS Arena	Royal Dublin Society	Dublin (Ballsbridge)	18,677	Pool games
Kingspan Stadium	IRFU	Belfast	18,168	Pool games
Celtic Park	Derry GAA	Derry	22,000	Pool games

==== France ====
Locations of the 9 stadia provisionally included in France's bid.

France, which hosted the 2007 Rugby World Cup, expressed interest in hosting the 2023 tournament. France launched its bid on 9 February 2017 revealing 19 potential host cities and an environmentally friendly transport plan. On 17 March, 12 host cities were selected. This list was later reduced to 9 cities (excluding Paris, Montpellier and Lens) :

Stadium	Location	Capacity
Stade de France	Saint-Denis (Paris)	81,338
Stade Vélodrome	Marseille	67,394
Stade Lyon-Décines	Décines-Charpieu (Lyon)	59,186
Stade Pierre-Mauroy	Villeneuve-d'Ascq (Lille)	50,157
Nouveau Stade de Bordeaux	Bordeaux	42,115
Stade Geoffroy Guichard	Saint-Étienne	41,965
Stade de la Beaujoire	Nantes	38,128* or 40,000
Stade de Nice	Nice	35,624
Stadium de Toulouse	Toulouse	33,150

- * To replace with new stadium also before 2024 Summer Olympics

=== Hosting recommendation and decision ===
On 31 October 2017, the Rugby World Cup Limited Board submitted a comprehensive evaluation report of the bidders. The report stated that all three countries were capable of hosting the 2023 Rugby World Cup, and recommended South Africa as the preferred host in light of the report's scoring. The evaluation report included a summary of the scoring:

RWCL executive summary scoring
Criteria	Weight	South Africa	France	Ireland
Finance, commercial and commitments	35%	26.69	28.44	26.69
Venues and host cities	30%	26.63	22.88	21.75
Tournament infrastructure	20%	15.50	13.75	13.63
Vision and hosting concept	10%	6.25	7.06	6.75
Tournament, organisation and schedule	5%	3.91	3.75	3.44
TOTAL	100%	78.97	75.88	72.25

The biggest differentiating factor among scoring was for venues. South Africa has an ample number of large and modern stadiums by virtue of its hosting the 2010 FIFA World Cup. By contrast, Ireland has not hosted a tournament of similar magnitude, and its stadiums would require significant technology and telecom upgrades to meet RWC requirements.

The evaluation report was met with criticism from French and Irish sources. The President of the French Rugby Federation, Bernard Laporte questioned why France, which had recently hosted the successful UEFA Euro 2016 football tournament, scored lower than South Africa for both stadiums and hotels. Irish media questioned why all three countries received the same score on security; South Africa has the eighth highest murder rate in the world, over 50 times higher than Ireland's rate, while France had suffered numerous terrorist attacks in 2012–17, leading to over 200 deaths. Additionally, the report included limited reference to the fact that Durban, South Africa had initially won the right to host the 2022 Commonwealth Games, before the Commonwealth Games Federation was forced to strip Durban of hosting rights for failure to deliver on key obligations and commitments.

The evaluation report by the Rugby World Cup Limited Board states that French law considers a criminal offence to use, hold or sell drugs. The French bid states that this "would have no impact on RWC 2023 as a tournament, including the participating teams", but it "has not provided any official government documentation to support this statement and therefore this could pose a risk to the tournament and participating teams". According to the report, RWCL "did not specifically request government commitment at this stage".

The World Rugby Council voted on 15 November 2017 to award the 2023 World Cup hosting rights to France. In the first round of voting, no country achieved a majority. Ireland were then eliminated as they gained the fewest votes in the first round. France defeated South Africa in the second round of voting. Council members reportedly preferred the financial superiority of the French bid. According to ESPN, "France's proposal guaranteed a net revenue return of £350 million for World Rugby to invest back into the game; Ireland and South Africa's in turn came in at around £270m." After the vote, IRFU chief executive Philip Browne conceded that last-placed Ireland could not match the other two countries financial offer and stadiums, and questioned whether World Rugby would allow a small country to host the World Cup.

The council voting was as follows:

RWC Council voting
Candidate	Round 1	Round 2
France	18	24
South Africa	13	15
Ireland	8	—
TOTAL	39	39

=== Declined or withdrew bid ===
==== Italy ====
Locations of the 12 stadia provisionally included in Italy's bid.

The Italian Rugby Federation (FIR) confirmed in March 2015 its intention to bid for the 2023 Rugby World Cup. On 12 August 2016, the Italian Rugby Federation announced the 12 stadiums they expressed interest in using for the 2023 event. However, on September 28, 2016, Italy officially withdrew from the competition to host the 2023 Rugby World Cup, after the decision of the Mayor of Rome, Virginia Raggi, to decline the bid of Rome to host the 2024 Summer Olympics.

==== United States ====
The United States was anticipated to bid and was considered a possible contender to host the 2023 or 2027 Rugby World Cup. World Rugby CEO Mike Miller stated in 2010 that the United States would host a Rugby World Cup, stating that "it's a question of when, not if." However, in 2023 United States was chosen as Host Nation for 2031 Rugby World Cup

==== Argentina ====
Argentina's World Rugby Council representative Agustín Pichot stated that Argentina wanted to host the 2023 tournament. In May 2016, following a meeting with Pichot, Argentine President Mauricio Macri announced government support for a 2027 Rugby World Cup bid.
