= Oregan Hoskins =

Rugby administrator

Vice-chairman of World Rugby
- In office 1 January 2012 – 30 June 2016
- Leader: Bernard Lapasset
- Preceded by: Bill Beaumont
- Succeeded by: Agustín Pichot

President of SARU
- In office 14 February 2006 – 17 August 2017
- Preceded by: Brian van Rooyen
- Succeeded by: Mark Alexander

Oregan Hoskins is a rugby administrator who served as president of the South African Rugby Union from 2006 to 2016, and as vice-president of World Rugby (formerly known as the International Rugby Board) from 2012 to 2016.

== Overview of policies ==
He was appointed to his role as SARU president in 2006, having previous been the president of the KwaZulu-Natal Rugby Union. Noted events that have occurred during his tenure as President include South Africa victory at the 2007 Rugby World Cup. One of Hoskins' key policies has been an increase in the rate of racial integration of South African blacks into the South African National team and the Super Rugby competition.

Soon after being appointed as President of SARU, he commented that there was an anti-South African bias in rugby.

Hoskins specifically accused Australian and New Zealand referees saying "Australia and New Zealand need to look at their referees when it comes to games involving South Africa. There is a genuine bias against South African teams."

Among the policies that Hoskins has promoted and encouraged is the development of a South African Haka based on some kind of traditional Zulu or Xhosa war dance. This, Hoskins noted, would help more of the South African population to identify directly with the sport.

== Criticism and controversy ==
=== Selection of Black players ===
Hoskins has encouraged the South African Super 14 teams, and the national team, to involve a higher number of black players. This policy was encouraged after the ANC chairman of the Parliamentary Committee for sport, Butana Komphela, criticized SARU heavily.

=== Conflict with Jake White ===
His period as president occurred over a period of continued clashes between the SARU administration and coach Jake White. After having led South Africa to the country's second world cup victory, White was informed by the administration that he was expected to apply to retain his position. White was not considered to remain as coach, while he argued that he should have since it was stated in his contract that he need not reapply.

Hoskins commented on the dispute, saying that "Jake was seen as someone who was never prepared to give the whole story and relied on public sentiment after the World Cup to support his cause as a martyr... The unfortunate thing is that Jake is now portrayed as the victim and the council as a bunch of idiots who just did not like him after we won the World Cup."

=== 2007 World Cup Controversies ===
Yet another controversy involving Hoskins was the selection of Luke Watson for the 2007 World Cup team. White and his selectors (Peter Jooste and former national coach Ian Macintosh), submitted a list of 45 players to the South African Rugby Union. Without White's knowledge, Watson was added to the list as a 46th player by SARU President Hoskins, fellow SARU executive council member Koos Basson, and Springbok team manager Zola Yeye. It was later revealed that Hoskins and other members of the SARU presidency (Deputy President Mike Stofile and Vice President Basson) had approached White and his selectors a week prior to the announcement to champion the inclusion of Watson and Odwa Ndungane.

Hoskins was also criticized for his failure to attend the homecoming of the World Cup winning team as it arrived home from the tournament, as well as his failure to appear on-field after the final. One member of the administration of the South African Rugby Supporters Union suggested that these two noted absences were due to Hoskins' rift with coach Jack White.

== See also ==
- South African Rugby Board
- South Africa national rugby union team
- Super Rugby
