= Cheeky Watson =

South African rugby union player (b.1954)

Daniel "Cheeky" Watson (born 1954) was one of the first white South African rugby union players to participate in a mixed race rugby game, during the period when mixed-race activities were forbidden by apartheid legislation.

== History ==
Watson grew up on a farm near Somerset East, in the Eastern Cape province of South Africa. His father was a lay preacher who taught his sons Daniel, Valence, Ronald, and Gavin that all people are equal. Watson attended Graeme College boarding school in Grahamstown, where he began playing rugby union. He later captained the Graeme College side.

After completing compulsory National Service, Watson returned to Port Elizabeth, where he played for the Crusaders Rugby Club.

As a 21-year-old, Watson played for the Eastern Province team which lost by 28 points to 13 to the visiting All Blacks in 1976. Mona Badela, black journalist and president of the KwaZakhele Rugby Union (Kwaru), invited him to practise his Christian convictions by coaching a black side in the townships. When Watson took the black rugby team to practise at the Saint George's sports ground in Port Elizabeth, they met with strong opposition.

Watson was selected as a wing for the Junior Springboks in 1976. However he declined an invitation to participate in the trials for the 1976 senior Springbok team. He joined the Spring Rose Rugby Football Club in the black township of New Brighton, Port Elizabeth, which was affiliated with Kwaru. His wing partner was Zola Yeye, later manager of the 2007 Springbok squad

On 10 October 1976, Watson and Valence played with 13 black players for Kwaru against the South Eastern Districts Rugby Union (Sedru) in the Dan Qeqe stadium in KwaZakhele township. Local authorities and the Crusaders Rugby Club tried to dissuade him from participating Inter-racial sports meetings were at that time prohibited in terms of the apartheid-era Group Areas Act and the Separate Amenities Act. Armored vehicles circled the stadium, and Watson and brother Valence had to lie flat on the floor of a taxi that transported black Africans. The black rugby team regularly stayed in the Watson's home.

By 1978 the Watson family had been drawn into the anti-apartheid struggle, with dual membership in the then-banned African National Congress and South African Communist Party. Brother Ronnie reportedly gathered intelligence for such organisations

The Watsons were subsequently threatened, ostracised, and shot at. Their home was burned down in 1986,. Friends stopped visiting, either because they were being threatened by authorities, or because they disagreed with the Watsons' political stance.

== Eastern Province Rugby Union ==
Watson is a business consultant and was the president of the Eastern Province Rugby Union based in Port Elizabeth, which operates the Eastern Province Elephants Currie Cup team and is also the co-owner of the Southern Kings team which was launched in June 2009 and will play Super Rugby from 2013 onwards.

In February 2017 Watson stepped down from his role as president of the EPRU. The EPRU's affairs had been placed into the administrative control of SA Rugby – at the union's invitation – in April 2016 to help regularise the union's financial affairs. Under Watson as president, the EPRU plunged into a financial crisis in 2015, with the union unable to pay players' salaries; players were forced to accept food vouchers following the non-payment of salaries. SA Rugby was eventually forced to step in and take control of the union which was eventually liquidated.

== Arrest on charges of fraud ==
On 31 March 2017 Watson and three others were arrested for fraud and appeared in the Port Elizabeth Magistrate's Court where they were released on bail. Their arrests come after an investigation by the Hawks into money laundering and corruption related to the Nelson Mandela Bay Municipality Public Transport System.

== Involvement in the career of his son, Luke Watson ==
Daniel Watson's son Luke Watson is also a rugby union footballer. In 2007 Watson senior stated he would not be supporting the Springboks at the World Cup in Paris because he did not believe the team was representative of the country. He also refused to comment on whether he supported John Smit as the captain.

== Order of Ikhamanga ==
On Monday 23 April 2012 the South African Presidency announced that Daniel Watson would be awarded the National Order of Ikhamanga in Silver for "his exceptional contribution to the field of sport, in particular rugby. He is recognised for his excellent contribution towards the creation of non-racial rugby, and his stand in the struggle for the creation of a non-racial, non-sexist and democratic society."

== See also ==
- Luke Watson

== Sources ==
- Williamson, Kristin (1998). Brothers to Us: The Story of a Remarkable Family's Fight Against Apartheid. Penguin. ISBN 978-0-14-026553-8.
- Clinton van der Berg and Lauren Cohen. "The gospel according to Luke", Sunday Times Online, 20 May 2007.
- Forde, Fiona; Westhuyzen, Jacques van der; Mohamed, Ashfak (16 May 2007). "Third force is running SA rugby". iol.co.za.
