= Bill Beaumont =

British Lions & England international rugby union player and administrator (born 1952)

Sir Bill Beaumont GBE DL
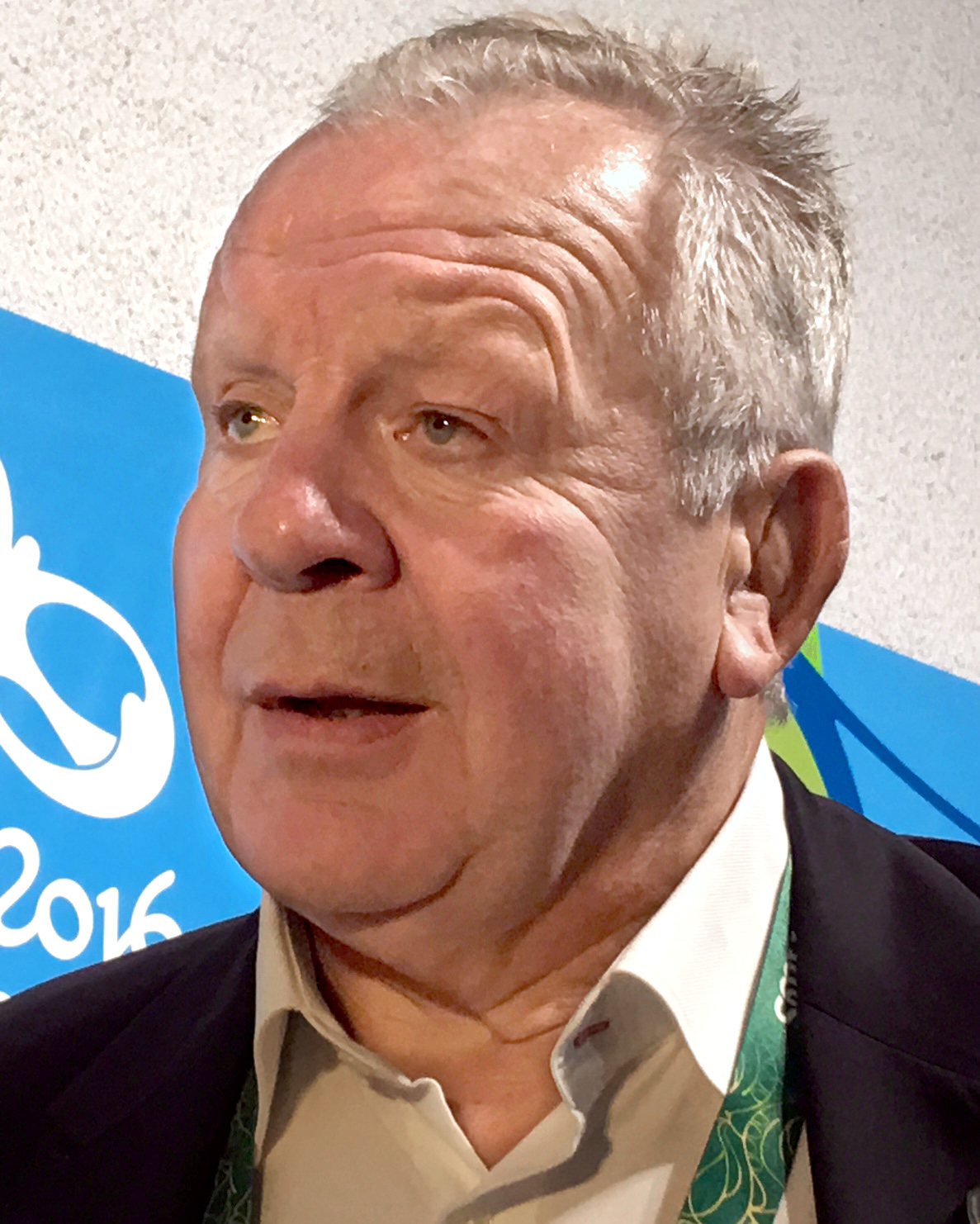
- Beaumont in 2016

Chairman of World Rugby
- In office 1 July 2016 – 14 November 2024
- Deputy: John Jeffrey (2020–2024); Bernard Laporte (2020–2022); Agustín Pichot (2016–2020)
- Preceded by: Bernard Lapasset
- Succeeded by: Brett Robinson

Chairman of the Rugby Football Union
- In office 8 July 2012 – October 2016
- Preceded by: Paul Murphy
- Succeeded by: Andy Cosslett

Vice-chairman of the IRB
- In office 1 January 2008 – 31 December 2011
- Preceded by: Bob Tuckey
- Succeeded by: Oregan Hoskins
- Born: William Blackledge Beaumont; 9 March 1952 (age 74) Chorley, Lancashire, England
- Height: 6 ft 3 in (1.91 m)
- Notable relative: Josh Beaumont (son)

Rugby union career
- Position: Lock
Amateur team(s)
Years	Team	Apps	(Points)
1969–1982	Fylde Rugby Club		
1975–1981	Barbarian F.C.		
1972–1982	Lancashire		
–	North of England		
International career
Years	Team	Apps	(Points)
1975–1982	England	34	(0)
1977–1980	British & Irish Lions	7	(0)
- Correct as of 1 September 2006

Sir William Blackledge Beaumont (born 9 March 1952) is an English former rugby union player, and was captain of the England national team, earning 34 caps. His greatest moment as captain was the unexpected 1980 Grand Slam win. He played as a lock.

He is currently the interim chairman of the Rugby Football Union, having previously held the position from 2012 to 2016, and was chairman of World Rugby from July 2016 to November 2024.

== Early life and youth ==
Beaumont was educated at Cressbrook School, Kirkby Lonsdale (also attended by another England and British Lions player, John Spencer) and Ellesmere College in Shropshire. He joined Fylde Rugby Club, Lancashire, in 1969 when he was 17 years old and stayed with the club until injury forced his retirement in 1982.

== Playing career ==
Beaumont won 34 caps for England, then a record for a lock, and was captain 21 times. He made his international debut as a 22-year-old in Dublin in 1975 as a late replacement for Roger Uttley. He toured Australia in 1975, Japan, Fiji and Tonga in 1979, and Argentina in 1981 with England. He played 15 times for the Barbarians, including the match against the All Blacks in 1978.

Beaumont took part in the 1977 British Lions tour to New Zealand after being called up as a replacement when Nigel Horton broke his thumb, and played in the final three tests. He took over as England captain in Paris in 1978. He was an inspiring captain of the North of England, whom he led to victory over the All Blacks in 1979, and also of England, who won their first Grand Slam for 23 years in 1980.

Beaumont then captained the 1980 British Lions tour to South Africa playing in 10 of the 18 matches. He was the first English captain of the Lions since Doug Prentice in 1930. He retired from rugby in 1982 on medical advice from doctors, because of successive concussions.

== Rugby administration ==
Beaumont has represented England since 1999 on the International Rugby Board (now World Rugby). He was the tour manager for the 2005 British & Irish Lions tour to New Zealand. In January 2012 he put his name forward to become the next Rugby Football Union (RFU) chairman, and was appointed as the chairman on 8 July 2012.

He then applied for the role of Chairman of World Rugby to replace Bernard Lapasset and on 11 May 2016 he was unanimously elected to the office, with his tenure beginning on 1 July 2016. Beaumont returned as interim chairman of the RFU in December 2024 after the resignation of Tom Ilube.

In 2007 the Rugby Football Union announced that the winners of the English County Championship would be awarded the Bill Beaumont Cup.

Already Officer of the Order of the British Empire (OBE), he was appointed Commander of the Order of the British Empire (CBE) in the 2008 Birthday Honours He was knighted in the Queen's New Years Honours list in 2019. and appointed Knight Grand Cross of the Order of the British Empire (GBE) in the 2024 New Year Honours for services to rugby football and charity.

He is a Deputy Lieutenant of Lancashire.

== Honours ==
- Grand Cordon of the Order of the Rising Sun (2025)

== See also ==
- International Rugby Hall of Fame

== Sources ==
- Profile on Rugby Hall of Fame

Sporting positions
Preceded by Roger Uttley; Roger Uttley	England national rugby union team captain 1978; Feb 1979-Jan 1982	Succeeded by Roger Uttley; Steve Smith
Preceded by Phil Bennett	British Lions captain 1980	Succeeded by Ciaran Fitzgerald
