= Bernard Lapasset =

French rugby administrator (1947–2023)

Bernard Lapasset ONZM
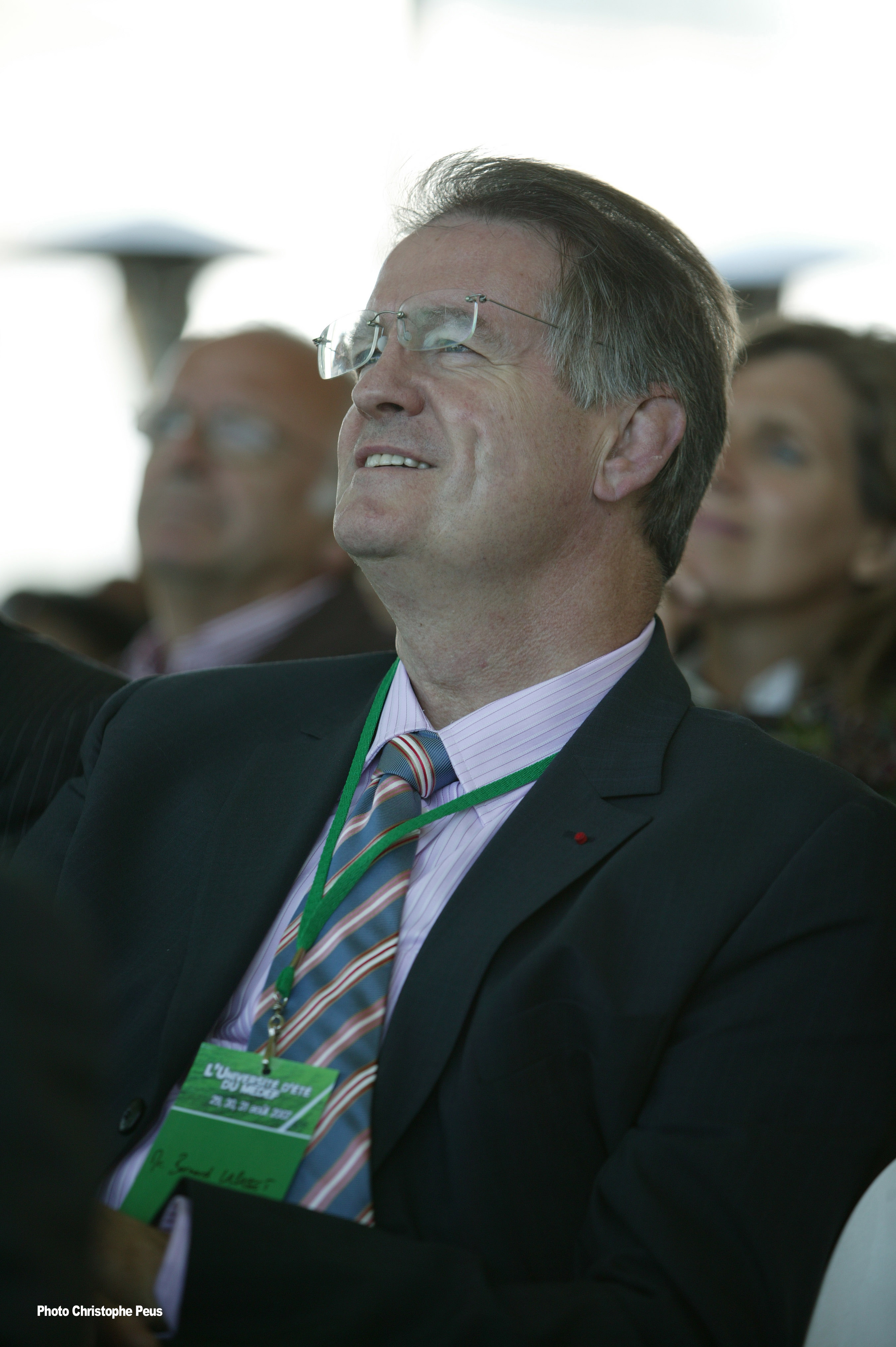
- Lapasset in 2007

Chairman of the International Rugby Board
- In office 1 January 2008 – 30 June 2016
- Preceded by: Syd Millar
- Succeeded by: Bill Beaumont

President of the French Rugby Federation
- In office 14 December 1991 – 12 July 2008
- Preceded by: Albert Ferrasse
- Succeeded by: Pierre Camou

Personal details
- Born: 20 October 1947 Tarbes, France
- Died: 3 May 2023 (aged 75) Louit, Hautes-Pyrénées, France

Bernard Lapasset ONZM (20 October 1947 – 3 May 2023) was a French rugby administrator who was Chairman of the World Rugby from 2008 to 2016. He previously served as President of the French Federation of Rugby Union from 1991 to May 2008, when Pierre Camou, then vice-president took over. He was also vice-chairman of the National Olympic Committee (CNOSF).

Lapasset played a critical role in France winning the hosting rights to the 2007 Rugby World Cup and its organisation and the introduction of rugby sevens into the Olympics for Rio 2016.

== Biography ==
Lapasset was born in Tarbes, Hautes-Pyrénées on 20 October 1947. He was married and had three children. Law degree and office, he was Director of Customs (General Directorate of Customs and Excise) before embarking on a career in rugby administration.

As a player of rugby, he was junior champion of France Agen Reichel with the U.S. in 1967 and Champion of France with the U.S. Customs Corporate Paris. As leader, he was chairman of the regional rugby in Île-de-France from 1988 to 1992, then secretary general of the French Rugby Federation in 1991.

In 2003, he helped obtain for France, the organization of the World Cup Rugby 2007. Since 2004, he was president of ILM 2007 World Cup.

On 19 October 2007, he was elected president of the IRB and thus succeeded Syd Millar. He served two terms and was succeeded by Englishman Bill Beaumont on 1 July 2016.

Lapasset was an Officer of the Legion of Honour and co-chairman of the France New Zealand Friendship Fund. In the 2006 Queen's Birthday Honours, he was appointed an honorary Officer of the New Zealand Order of Merit, for services to France–New Zealand relations.

Lapasset was also the co-chairman of the Organizing Committee of the Paris 2024 Olympic and Paralympic Games.

Lapasset died from Alzheimer's disease in Louit on 2 May 2023, at the age of 75.

== Controversy ==
The 1993 French Rugby Union Championship was won by Castres who beat Grenoble 14–11 in the final, in a match decided by an irregular try accorded by the referee.

A try of Olivier Brouzet was denied to Grenoble and the decisive try by Gary Whetton was awarded by the referee, Daniel Salles, when in fact the defender Franck Hueber from Grenoble touched down the ball first in his try zone. This error gave the title to Castres.

Daniel Salles admitted the error 13 years later.

Jacques Fouroux conflict with the Federation cry out conspiracy.
