= Pierre Camou =

French rugby union administrator

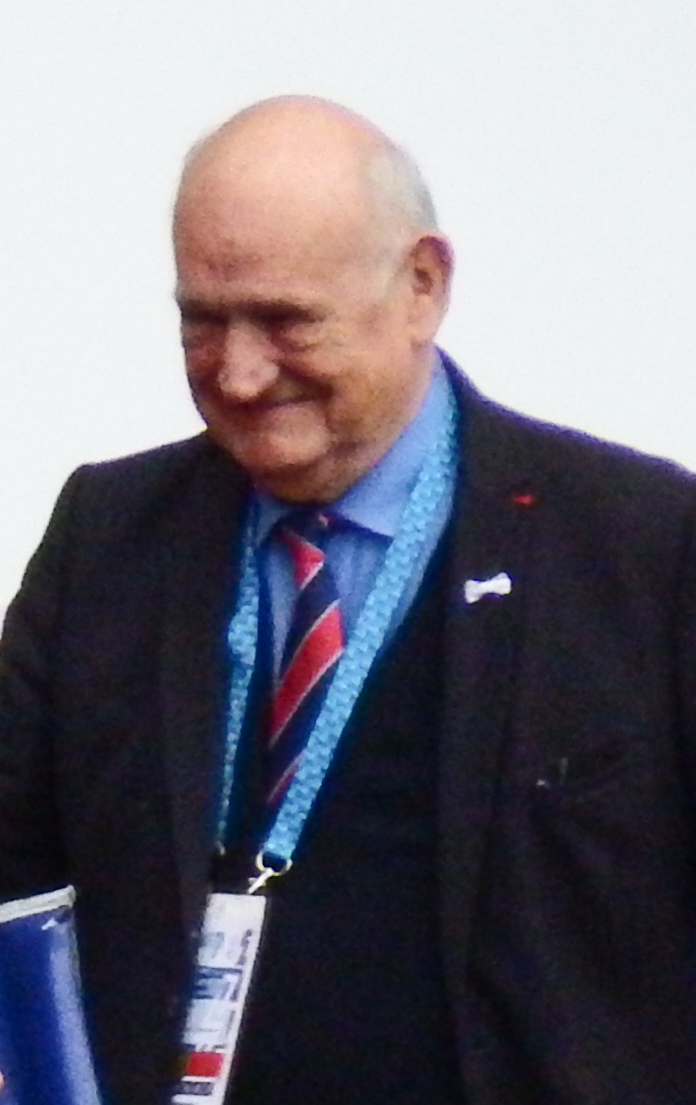

President of the French Rugby Federation
- In office 12 July 2008 – 3 December 2016
- Preceded by: Bernard Lapasset
- Succeeded by: Bernard Laporte

Personal details
- Born: 18 August 1945 Uhart-Cize, France
- Died: 15 August 2018 (aged 72) Ispoure, France

Pierre Camou (18 August 1945 – 15 August 2018) was a French rugby union administrator. He was the President of the French Rugby Federation from 2008 to 2016, before he was succeeded by Bernard Laporte. Prior to becoming President of the FFR he was also the treasurer then vice-president of FIRA-AER.

In 2011, Camou was ranked by ESPN as the 20th most influential person in World Rugby. Camou was also involved in France’s successful bid to host the 2023 Rugby World Cup.
