= Rugby World Cup hosts =

Rugby World Cup host nation

The Rugby World Cup host nation for both men and women is selected by World Rugby at a meeting six years before each tournament. Each of the Men's Rugby World Cups from 1987 to 2015 were hosted by countries that are considered the traditional powers in World Rugby. The first non Rugby Championship or Six Nations country to host a Rugby World Cup was Japan in 2019, after failed bids for the 2011 (awarded to New Zealand) and 2015 (awarded to England) tournaments. The women's version of the Rugby World Cup, which is known as the Women's Rugby World Cup, was first held in 1991, alternating with even-numbered non-leap years from 1994 to 2014 before switching to odd-numbered years from 2017 onwards.

== Current criteria ==
World Rugby requires a country to possess the necessary facilities to host a Rugby World Cup. Stadiums must have a capacity at least 15,000, with the stadium for the final having a capacity of at least 60,000. The stadiums have other requirements, such as pitch size and floodlighting.

World Rugby also looks for hosts that will either generate significant revenue or hosts that will spread the geographic reach of the sport. According to World Rugby Chairman Bernard Lapasset in 2008: "As the revenue generation is vital to our ongoing development plans, we recognise that the World Cup has to be held in one of our senior core markets on a regular basis . . . However, the commercial success of the tournament also means we can now consider placing the tournament in new developing markets to assist the game's strategic growth."

World Rugby also tends to rotate continents, with no continent to date hosting two consecutive World Cups.

== List of Rugby World Cup hosts ==
=== Men's ===
| Tournament | Matches | Matches hosted by nation(s) | Other bidders |
|---|---|---|---|
| 1987 | 32 | New Zealand (21); Australia (11) | —N/a |
| 1991 | 32 | France (8); England (7); Wales (7); Scotland (5); Ireland (5) | —N/a |
| 1995 | 32 | South Africa (32) | —N/a |
| 1999 | 41 | Wales (9); England (9); France (8); Scotland (8); Ireland (7) | —N/a |
| 2003 | 48 | Australia (48) | ~~New Zealand~~ |
| 2007 | 48 | France (42); Wales (4); Scotland (2) | England |
| 2011 | 48 | New Zealand (48) | Japan; South Africa |
| 2015 | 48 | England (40); Wales (8) | South Africa; Italy; Japan |
| 2019 | 45 (Note: 48 matches were scheduled for 2019 in Japan, but three were cancelled due to Typhoon Hagibis.) | Japan (45) | South Africa; Italy; ~~Russia~~; ~~Australia~~ |
| 2023 | 48 | France (48) | South Africa; Ireland |
| Totals 1987–2023 | 422 | France (106); New Zealand (69); Australia (59); England (56); Japan (45); South Africa (32); Wales (28); Scotland (15); Ireland (12) | |
| 2027 | 52 (Expec.) | Australia | ~~Argentina~~; ~~Russia~~ |
| 2031 | TBD | United States | —N/a (Note: The 2031 Men's Rugby World Cup was given to the United States without any other unions making a bid at the time it was acclaimed.) |

=== Women's ===
| Tournament | Matches | Matches hosted by nation(s) |
|---|---|---|
| 1991 | 15 | Wales (15) |
| 1994 | 31 | Scotland (31) |
| 1998 | 40 | Netherlands (40) |
| 2002 | 32 | Spain (32) |
| 2006 | 30 | Canada (30) |
| 2010 | 30 | England (30) |
| 2014 | 30 | France (30) |
| 2017 | 30 | Ireland (30) |
| 2021 | 26 | New Zealand (26) |
| 2025 | 32 | England (32) |
| 2029 | TBD (Expec.) | Australia |
| 2033 | TBD (Expec.) | United States |

== Hosts by tournament for both men and women ==
=== 1987: New Zealand and Australia (Men) ===
The first Men's Rugby World Cup was hosted by Australia and New Zealand after the Australian Rugby Union and the New Zealand Rugby Union each independently wrote to the International Rugby Board seeking to conduct a World Cup tournament. The final was played in Auckland, New Zealand, at Eden Park and won by New Zealand.

=== 1991: Wales (Women) ===
The first Women's Rugby World Cup was hosted by Wales and there were 12 nations. The final was played in Cardiff, Wales at Cardiff Arms Park and won by the United States.

=== 1991: England, Ireland, Wales, France and Scotland (Men) ===
Shortly after the inaugural Women's Rugby World Cup was held, the 1991 Rugby World Cup was jointly hosted by the Five Nations Championship countries (England, Ireland, Wales, France and Scotland), with games played all over these five European nations. Pool A, in which England played, saw half of the matches played in London, though games were also in Leicester, Gloucester and Otley. Pool B games involved European nations Scotland and Ireland, which had all their games in either Dublin or Edinburgh; one game was played in Belfast. Pool C included Wales, whose games were all played in Cardiff, with the other games in Pontypool, Pontypridd, and Llanelli. Pool D, of which France were a part, saw games played in Agen, Bayonne, Béziers Brive, Grenoble, and Toulouse. None of the quarter-finals or semi-finals was played in England. The final was played at the Rugby Football Union's Twickenham.

=== 1994: Scotland (Women) ===
Originally scheduled to be held in Amsterdam, Netherlands but cancelled only weeks before, the second Women's Rugby World Cup was hosted by Scotland and once again, there were 12 nations. The final was played in Edinburgh, Scotland at Raeburn Place where England became the first British women's rugby union team to win the Women's Rugby World Cup.

=== 1995: South Africa (Men) ===
The 1995 World Cup was hosted and won by South Africa. The IRB broke new ground by awarding the tournament to an African nation, making it the first major sporting event ever held on the continent. This was also the first Rugby World Cup to be played entirely in one country.

The tournament is most remembered for two moments—the emergence of Jonah Lomu as a rugby superstar, and the trophy presentation. In one of the most emotional moments in sports history, President Nelson Mandela wore a Springbok jersey and matching Springbok cap when presenting the trophy to the team's Afrikaner captain Francois Pienaar. Mandela's jersey had Pienaar's number 6 on the back. The presentation was widely seen as a sign of reconciliation between South Africa's black and white communities.

=== 1998: Netherlands (Women) ===
This was the first Women's Rugby World Cup to be fully sanctioned by the International Rugby Board and also the first Women's Rugby World Cup to be held outside the British Isles. The number of teams increased from 12 to 16. New Zealand became the first Australasian women's rugby union to win the Women's Rugby World Cup.

=== 1999: Wales (Men) ===
The 1999 World Cup was hosted by Wales with some matches spread across Scotland, England, Ireland and France. The format of the pool games was similar to the 1991 World Cup in England. All Pool A games were held in Scotland, Pool B games in England, Pool C games in France, Pool D games were all held in Wales and Pool E games were all held in Ireland. Second round play-offs and the quarter-finals were held a variety of European venues, the semi-finals were held at Twickenham Stadium, London. The third place play-off and the final were held at the new Millennium Stadium in Cardiff.

=== 2002: Spain (Women) ===
This was the second Women's Rugby World Cup to be fully sanctioned by the International Rugby Board and all six teams from the Women's Six Nations Championship England, Scotland, Wales, France, Ireland and Italy competed for the first time The final was staged at Barcelona. New Zealand won for the second time.

=== 2003: Australia (Men) ===
The 2003 Cup was intended to be held jointly by Australia and New Zealand, but disagreements between the International Rugby Board and the NZRU, over sponsorship, advertising and ticketing, saw the competition played solely in Australia. This was the first and only tournament to date to be won by a team from the northern hemisphere. The 2003 World Cup saw matches played in eleven stadia in ten Australian cities.

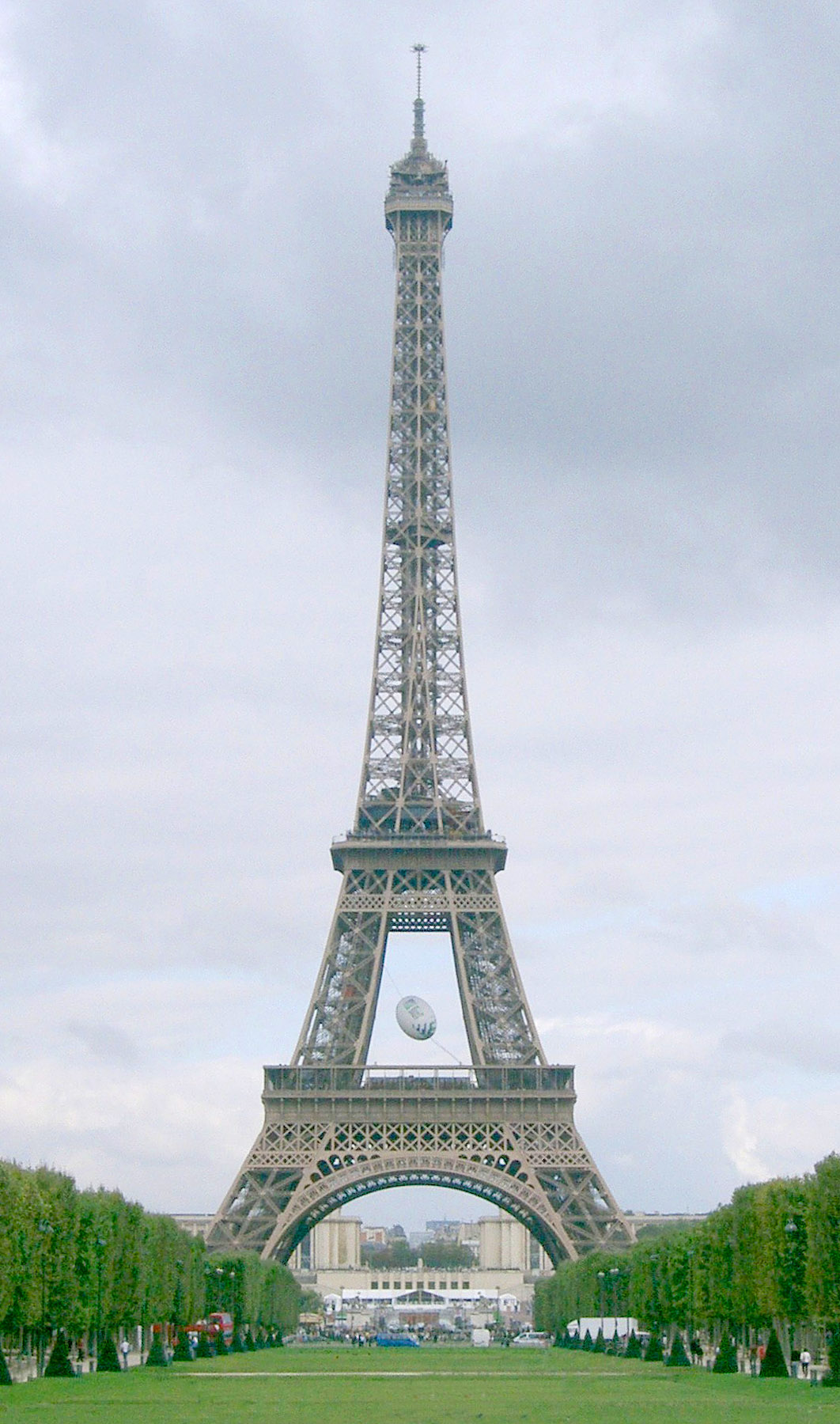
Eiffel Tower decorated with a rugby ball for the 2007 RWC.

=== 2006: Canada (Women) ===
This was the first Women's Rugby World Cup to be played in North America and also the first Women's Rugby World Cup to held outside Europe. New Zealand won for the third time.

=== 2007: France (Men) ===
Unlike the previous tournaments in 1991 and 1999 where five countries in Europe hosted matches, the IRB decided to award the right to host the 2007 tournament to one country.

Both England and France bid to host the tournament. England's bid included a two-tier tournament – a 16 team format, and a separate Nations Cup for emerging countries – and altering the structure of the qualifying tournament. France's bid had a traditional 20-team format to be held in September and October.

The IRB announced in April 2003 that France had won the right to host the tournament. The French bid won with 18 out of 21 votes, with IRB Chairman Syd Millar stating that "The council was overwhelmingly of the view that the structure should remain as it is." The tournament was moved to the proposed September–October dates with the tournament structure remaining as it was. It was also announced that ten French cities would be hosting games, with the final at the Stade de France.

=== 2010: England (Women) ===
The 2010 Women's Rugby World Cup was played in England for the first time and the third British host nation to do so, following the previous two tournaments that were held Wales in 1991 and Scotland in 1994 respectively. New Zealand won the fourth title.

=== 2011: New Zealand (Men) ===
New Zealand, Japan, and South Africa bid to host the tournament. South Africa was eliminated in the first round of IRB voting; in the second round, New Zealand won the vote 13 to 8, and the IRB Council awarded the hosting of the 2011 Rugby World Cup to New Zealand. The bidding occurred in November 2005, the first time that hosting rights had been awarded to a nation six years in advance. The voting procedure was managed by a team of independent auditors.

Some bookmakers had initially made Japan the favourite to win the vote, reasoning that it was believed there was a desire to take the Rugby World Cup to a non-traditional rugby nation, and host the event in Asia for the first time.

There were also concerns about New Zealand's infrastructure, however an IRB fact-finding mission impressed the executives.

South Africa had initially explored the possibility of inviting other African countries to stage some matches, and South Africa had also discussed with Argentina the possibility of hosting some matches in Buenos Aires. Ultimately, however, South Africa submitted a solo bid.

Additionally, the United States were discussed in the media as a country that might submit a bid, but the United States did not bid.

Japan responded critically to the IRB's decision to award the 2011 World Cup to New Zealand, with the Japanese RFU chief Yoshiro Mori declaring: "The established nations pass the ball around their friends . . . Only the interests of the bigger unions remain." Despite not winning the right to host the 2011 World Cup, Japan Rugby officials remained optimistic about future opportunities. Japan Rugby stated: "We want to help with the spread of rugby fever . . . and we believe that dispersing rugby fever in the biggest continent on the planet will help the IRB in their mission of globalizing the game we all love."

The IRB defended its decision to award the 2011 World Cup to New Zealand instead of Japan, stating: "New Zealand can guarantee packed stadiums and that can't be guaranteed in Japan."

=== 2014: France (Women) ===
The 2014 Women's Rugby World Cup was held in France. It was the first time since 1994 when they hadn't competed, that New Zealand failed to win the major title. England won the tournament 21-9 for the second time against Canada on 17 August. This was the last Women's Rugby World Cup to be held in even-numbered non-leap years prior to the next tournament in 2017, held jointly in Ireland and Northern Ireland.

=== 2015: England (Men) ===
The host for the 2015 tournament was England, who won their bid on 28 July 2009. A record ten unions indicated formal interest in hosting the 2015 and/or the 2019 events: Australia, England, Ireland, Italy, Jamaica, Japan, Russia, Scotland, South Africa and Wales. Argentina had been reported in early 2008 as having given preliminary consideration to bidding, but did not ultimately formally indicate an interest in bidding.

=== 2017: Ireland (Women) ===
The 2017 Women's Rugby World Cup was held in Ireland as well Northern Ireland. The tournament moved to odd-numbered years alternating with the men's counterpart which avoided the clash with other rugby 7s-based tournaments which are staged in both the Commonwealth Games as well as the Summer Olympics. New Zealand won their 5th title and their first since 2010.

=== 2019: Japan (Men) ===
The host for the 2019 tournament was Japan, who won the right to host the tournament on 28 July 2009. Japan became the event's first-ever host outside of the sport's traditional top-tier nations.

=== 2021: New Zealand (Women) ===
The 2021 Women's Rugby World Cup was held in New Zealand and the first to be held in Australasia. Due to the COVID-19 pandemic, the tournament was postponed to 2022 and New Zealand won their tournament in home soil.

=== 2023: France (Men) ===
Several countries declared their interest in hosting the 2023 Rugby World Cup, including ones that have already hosted RWC matches and countries looking to host a tournament for the first time.

South Africa was considered one of the front runners to host the 2023 competition, having bid unsuccessfully for the right to host the 2011, 2015 and 2019 tournaments. Ireland submitted a formal bid, following the January 2014 establishment of a government taskforce to assess a bid to host the Rugby World Cup. Previous host nation France also submitted a bid to host again in 2023.

The United States, Argentina, and Italy had also expressed interest in hosting, but none of the three countries submitted a formal bid.

On 15 November 2017, it was announced that France had beaten rivals Ireland and South Africa, in its successful bid to host the 2023 Rugby World Cup.

=== 2025: England (Women) ===
The 2025 Women's Rugby World Cup was held in England for the second time after the previous edition which was held in 2010. England won their tournament in home soil for the first time since 2014.

=== 2027: Australia (Men) ===
After Argentina withdrew its bid, the Australian bid was the sole favourite for the 2027 Rugby World Cup host. During the annual meeting in Dublin on May 12, 2022, the World Rugby Council unanimously approved Australia and the United States as the host tournament of the men's World Cup in 2027 and 2031, respectively.

=== 2029: Australia (Women) ===
After the men's version, the 2029 Women's Rugby World Cup will be held in Australia and the second Australasian nation after the 2021 Women's Rugby World Cup in New Zealand to do so.

=== 2031: United States (Men) ===
The United States became the sole bid for the 2031 Rugby World Cup in November 2021. During the annual meeting in Dublin on May 12, 2022, the World Rugby Council unanimously approved Australia and the United States as the host tournament of the men's World Cup in 2027 and 2031, respectively.

=== 2033: United States (Women) ===
After the men's version, the 2033 Women's Rugby World Cup will be held in the United States and the second North American nation after the 2006 Women's Rugby World Cup in Canada to do so.

=== 2035: TBC (Men) ===
The host selection process for the 2035 Men's Rugby World Cup was officially launched by World Rugby in September 2025, with expressions of interest opening the following month.

== See also ==
- Rugby League World Cup hosts
