= Luke Watson =

South African rugby union player

- Full name: Luke Asher Watson
- Born: 26 October 1983 (age 43) Port Elizabeth, South Africa
- Height: 1.84 m (6 ft 1/2 in)
- Weight: 103 kg (227 lb; 16 st 3 lb)
- School: Grey High School
- Notable relative: Cheeky Watson (father)

Rugby union career
- Position(s): Flanker; No 8
Youth career
- 2002: Mighty Elephants
Senior career
Years	Team	Apps	(Points)
2002, 2011–2015	Eastern Province Kings	34	(125)
2003–2004	Sharks	20	(5)
2003–2004	Sharks (Currie Cup)	19	(10)
2005–2009	Stormers	62	(50)
2005–2009	Western Province	48	(130)
2009–2011	Bath Rugby	41	(25)
2013	Southern Kings	6	(10)
- Correct as of 6 September 2015
International career
Years	Team	Apps	(Points)
2001	S.A. Schools		
2002	South Africa Under-19		
2002	South Africa 7s		
2004	South Africa Under-21	2	(7)
2007–2008	South Africa	10	(0)
2011	South African Kings	2	(0)
- Correct as of 22 February 2013
Medal record
Men's rugby sevens
Representing South Africa
Commonwealth Games
Bronze medal – third place	2002 Manchester	Team competition

Luke Asher Watson (born 26 October 1983 in Port Elizabeth) is a South African former rugby union footballer who can play at flank or eighthman. He has represented and captained the South African Schools rugby team (2001), South Africa's under-19 (2002) and under-21 (2004) teams, as well as the Springbok Sevens team (2001). Watson has also captained both the Western Province and the Super Rugby Stormers. He most recently played for the Eastern Province Kings.

Watson has been controversial due to his relationship with then-national coach Jake White, political interference in his selection for the 2007 Springbok team, interaction with the squad afterwards, and his comments in a speech. Watson told a public gathering on 3 October 2008 that he had to stop himself from vomiting when he wore the Springbok jersey, and referred to black players such as Zola Yeye who during apartheid had been excluded from national selection. The media suggested that Watson had also denigrated Afrikaner players and rugby officials in a question and answer session, although the transcript of the speech does not bear this out.

Consequently, some South African rugby supporters and players (mostly Afrikaners) launched verbal attacks against Watson (often vehement and personal), Afrikaner rights groups like the Afrikanerbond sought his exclusion from rugby, and some spectators vocally expressed their disapproval whenever he played in South Africa.

Watson has denied that he is against Afrikaners, pointing out that not only does he oppose all forms of discrimination but that he also has Afrikaner ancestors. He conceded in 2010 that he had been used as "a political pawn" and that he would have done things differently if he had the chance to do them over. He regretted attending the Springbok training camp in 2007, knowing that neither he, the squad, nor White wanted him to be there.

== Youth ==
Luke Watson is the son of anti-apartheid activist Daniel "Cheeky" Watson, who was also a rugby player of national standard in his youth. Watson comes from a family traditionally strongly committed to Christianity. His grandfather, Daniel John Watson, was a Pentecostal lay preacher and transmitted Christian values to Luke's father while Cheeky was growing up in Grahamstown. Luke Watson has openly admitted to being a committed Christian who wanted to become a minister at the age of 17, and who believes that doing God's work is to help those on the margins. He sports four religious tattoos on his body, including a cross on his right biceps and the reference "Habakkuk 3:17" on his left arm. While living in Cape Town he fed homeless persons three times a week and let them shower at his home. Watson says that he prays continuously while on the field, asking God " 'where the gaps are, where the weaknesses are in defence and help me be in the right place' ". Yet he does not believe in being judgmental, and describes himself as " 'very tentative to preach too quickly' ".

=== School years ===
While attending Grey Junior School in Port Elizabeth Luke realized, at the age of 7, that because they associated with blacks and had supported the anti-apartheid struggle, his family was different from other white South Africans. His father had joined the African National Congress in 1978 and had helped to hide cadres from the secret police, who burnt down his home in 1986 as well as his business. Luke Watson was ostracized by other students and someone wrote "Kill the Watsons" on his desk. When his father was imprisoned his mother, Tracey, hid this from him. He learnt about racism and apartheid from his father, and wanted to represent the change that his father had worked for.

Watson played rugby at Grey High School where he was coached from Grade 10 onwards by Mike Howe. Howe first switched Watson from eighthman to openside flank. Later Howe favourably remembered Watson's ball-fetching skills from rucks and his motivational abilities, but said that at the time his organisational skills "let him down".

In Grade 12 Watson captained Grey High's First XV. He organized a strike of the team after objections were raised that he had abused his position as captain. During his final year of high school Watson told his principal, Roy Simpson, that he was resigning as prefect. Some claim that Watson's resignation was due to his loyalty to "the wrong crowd", while his father maintained it was because the younger Watson had objected to "autocratic leadership" at the school. Despite his actions, Watson was given the Headmaster's Leadership award that year.

With his cousin, Daniel, Luke Watson represented the Eastern Province XV at the 2000 Craven Week. Aged 16, he scored a try in their 21-all draw against Griqualand-West, and was in the Eastern Province schools team that played in a curtain raiser for the test between South Africa and Canada on 10 June. In July 2001 he was back at the Craven Week where he impressed in Eastern Province's 15–17 loss against a Blue Bulls side.

=== National selection ===
Watson was selected for the South African Academy side in 2000 that beat the South African Schools side that year. He was invited to a training camp in March 2001 but was not selected for the national under-19 team that participated in the Junior World Championship in Santiago, Chile.

In 2001 Watson was chosen as captain of the South African Schools team that played the French under-18 team twice. The SA Schools side, which included Bismarck du Plessis and Derick Hougaard won the first match in Cape Town 36–15. In the second clash at Loftus Versfeld, which was drawn 23–23, Watson "played well" and scored a try. In October 2001 he was one of five nominees for the Craven Week Player of the Tournament, which was awarded to Derick Hougaard.

In 2002 Watson was chosen to captain South Africa's under-19 team at the IRB Junior World Championship in Italy. The team had three weeks to prepare and beat Chili (48–3) in their first game and England (17–8) on their way to a semifinal in Milan which they lost 41–9 to New Zealand, the eventual champions. The IRB commended Watson for representing the spirit of the competition in being well-spoken and without pretense. Watson told a reporter that it was an honour to be part of Springbok history. He added, "for my Dad, Cheeky Watson, it is a dream come true. He is very proud that his son plays for a unified South African team".

Watson was selected for the South African Sevens team that played at the 2002 Commonwealth Games, replacing Marius Schoeman who withdrew due to a broken arm. Coached by Chester Williams and managed by Rob Louw, the team placed third. Watson and teammate Jean de Villiers impressed former England international Matt Dawson as potential future Springboks for the 15-aside format.

Despite speculation that he would be selected for the Springbok squad in 2003, national coach Rudolf Straeuli overlooked Watson for tests against Scotland and Australia. The national selectors did include him in the South African A-team that faced Argentina A at Wellington on 25 June.

Watson was selected in 2004 to represent South Africa in the IRB's Under 21 Rugby World Championship in a team that included Andries Bekker, Bryan Habana and Wynand Olivier. Coached by Peter de Villiers, the team beat Australia 44–10 to finish third.

Watson later credited former Springbok and national coach Michael du Plessis as the person (apart from his father) who had the greatest influence on his playing abilities early on. His parents asked Du Plessis to help develop a teenage Watson in Port Elizabeth. A reporter claimed that "within two seconds" Du Plessis taught young Watson "more about running lines than other coaches could do in two years".

== Early senior career ==
=== Eastern Province Elephants, 2002 ===
In 2002 Watson was included in the Eastern Province under-21 team before progressing to the senior squad.

During round one of the Currie Cup Watson was included in the Elephants' first match against the Pumas on 20 July after impressing coach Allister Coetzee with his speed and work rate in the warm-up game against Boland. Watson played alongside experienced players like Paul Treu, who had already represented the Emerging Springboks, and Barry Pinnock, who had played more than 150 times for Eastern Province. Despite having won seven consecutive games prior to the 2002 season, the Elephants lost all but one of their 6 first-round games. In one of these, against the SWD Eagles on 24 August, Watson was "involved in too many incidents off the ball to be of much value to his team". He scored his "first try at senior level" in the match against the Leopards on 7 September. Watson was included in the team that pulled off an unlikely round one victory against unbeaten log leaders the Bulls on 14 September.

The Elephants fared better in the second round of the Bankfin Cup, the bottom division of the Currie Cup, with Watson scoring a try in their come-from-behind 41–35 win against Boland. But he had to withdraw from the semi-final after sustaining a serious lower back injury against the Griffons on 5 October. The Elephants lost the semifinal against Border, so finishing in third place with 3 wins of 5 games played.

By the end of the 2002 season Watson was called "promising" and "one of the most exciting young ball fetchers in the country", and by November he was being actively sought by the Durban-based Sharks. Watson revealed that while he would have preferred to stay with Eastern Province, they had offered him a small contract which had not yet been confirmed. He felt that Eastern Province's reluctance was due to his father having stood against and narrowly lost to George Davids for election as president of the Eastern Province Rugby Football Union.

=== Sharks, 2003–04 ===
Watson relocated to Durban in 2003 where he represented the Sharks in the Currie Cup and the Sharks in the Super 12 competitions. By June 2003 he had signed up with rugby agent Jason Smith's World Artists, who represented South African players such as Victor Matfield and Clyde Rathbone locally and abroad. Sharks Coach Kevin Putt included Watson in the team that won 32–19 against a weakened Harlequins at the Stoop in London on 2 February.

At the start of the Super 12 season Watson was hailed by Sharks fitness coach Kevin Stevenson as the fittest among the Shark forwards while also able to bench-press "1.6 times his body weight" and complete 29 pull-ups. He made the squad for what would have been his Super 12 debut on 21 February against a Stormers side that included "two of the best fetchers in South Africa, Corné Krige en Hendrik Gerber". But Watson did not play in the game, as his inclusion had been part of Putt's failed ruse to mislead his opponents. Watson made his actual Super 12 debut came against the Brumbies, at 19 the youngest player in the Super 12 that year. His direct opponent was flank George Smith, regarded as "one of the best fetchers in the world". Smith had been Watson's hero while he was a schoolboy at Grey. Watson's performance was excellent, according to Putt, who claimed that he and forwards coach John Allan had only recently taught Watson the finer arts of being a fetcher.

During the Super 12 season "the exciting" Watson was commended for combining "a high tackle count with good skills" while producing "sparkling tries", as he did in the Sharks' 35–20 loss to the Hurricanes in March. There were some concerns about his "lack of bulk", despite his "gutsy" performances. A hamstring injury and a bruised hip early in March caused Watson to miss Super rugby matches against the Highlanders and the Cats respectively. His rival for the open-side flank position, Roland Bernard, was selected instead for the game against the Chiefs. On his return to the team Watson won the man of the match award in the Sharks' 18–23 defeat to the Crusaders in Christchurch on 12 April. He retained his place for the match against the Bulls on 10 May, which his team lost 16–24. The Sharks ended a miserable and injury-plagued Super 12 season in 11th place with only 3 wins.

The 2003 Currie Cup season started badly for Watson, who had contracted tick-bite fever and was forced to miss the Sharks' first warm-up game in July. He was replaced by Solly Tyibilika, newly arrived in Durban from the Lions. Watson then injured his leg, and Tyibilika retained his place for subsequent games against the Eagles and Griquas. During the season Watson was switched from flank to eighthman five times, anticipating where coaches would use him later at the Stormers and Bath. In the Currie Cup final against the Bulls which the Sharks lost 19–40, Watson replaced Brad McLeod-Henderson in the 54-minute of the match. He was not nominated for any category in the end-of-season awards, despite a reporter calling him "the country's top rookie loose-forward".

Watson's good form during the 2004 Super 12 season made him a recruiting target for professional teams. While he was still under contract to the Sharks, his terms were to expire at the end of 2004. During the Currie Cup season Watson was rumored to be seeking to represent the Stormers in the 2005 Super 12 season, and by 30 August the Stormers had offered him a contract. On 14 September Watson publicly announced that he had signed with the Stormers, despite efforts by the Sharks' management to retain his services. Watson expected to play out the remainder of his Sharks contract in the Currie Cup until the Stormers' started their Super rugby training in December 2004. Instead, he was released on the same day as he made his announcement. Both Sharks CEO Brian van Zyl and coach Kevin Putt indicated that they preferred to work with players who had a long-term commitment to the team. Watson was left without a professional home base for the remaining three months of the Currie Cup season. He spent the time with his parents in Port Elizabeth to recuperate from injuries and prepare for upcoming season. Meanwhile, he joined local club SK Walmers which had strong ties to the black community and his family.

=== Western Province, 2005 ===
In 2005 Watson moved to Cape Town where he played for both the Western Province Currie Cup and Stormers Super rugby sides. His home club was Schotsekloof Walmers Rugby Football Club. Coach Gert Smal included Watson in his Super 12 training camp at Somerset-West in January, and in the team for their warm-up games against Boland and Welsh side Gwent Dragons.

Watson made his Super 12 debut for the Stormers against his old team, the Sharks, on 25 February. He dismissed suggestions that his unhappy departure from the Natal team would cause unlawful play on either side. Ahead of the game, the media made much of the "dream combination" of Watson, Burger, and Joe van Niekerk. Watson and Burger agreed before the match to take turns to act as fetcher, depending on who was on the open side of the playing field at scrums. Watson had looked forward to playing with Burger and Van Niekerk, who he described as " 'quality players from whom I will learn a lot' ".

Watson's perceived lineout weakness was a factor when Smal replaced him with the 197 cm tall Adri Badenhorst for the 19 March game against the Waratahs in Sydney. Ironically, Watson replaced Badenhorst in the 67th minute of the game. Despite being restricted to his hotel room during the week by Smal due to signs of flu, Watson played in the Stormers' 9–12 loss to the Hurricanes in their next game. Due to injuries Watson, Burger, and Van Niekerk would not play together again before the game against the Chiefs on 30 April. Throughout the season rugby journalists commented positively on Watson's performance, particularly his "excellent fetching skills". One said that at times his playing "set the field alight", although another lamented that he lacked Burger's physical abilities. The Stormers ended the season at 9th place with 3 wins and one drawn game, 27 points behind log leaders Crusaders.

A shoulder injury prevented Watson from playing in Western Province's first warm-up game of the Currie Cup season against the Lions on 11 June. He was one of 17 regulars who were unavailable for Province at the time because of Springbok squad duties or injuries. But he recovered sufficiently to play in the second warm-up match against the French Barbarians on 16 June. Because he had been used in this position by the Sharks, Province coach Kobus van der Merwe temporarily switched Watson to eighthman for Province's opening Currie Cup match against the Cheetahs on 24 June. He was back at flank when he scored a try in the next game against the Griffons on 1 July. He missed the game against the Leopards because of flu, and was relegated to the substitutes' bench for the following one against the Bulldogs. David Hendricks took his place for both matches. Watson regained his place and scored two tries in the 42–16 victory over Griquas on 29 July. He did not play in Western Province's 11–16 semi-final Currie Cup loss to the Cheetahs.

== Controversies ==
=== Relationship with former national coach Jake White, 2002–07 ===
In 2003 coach Jake White chose Schalk Burger and omitted Watson for the South African under-21 team that won the world championship. White suggested that Watson switch to hooker instead where he could reach the highest echelons, as Watson did not have the requisite attributes to be a first-class flank. White's suggestions may have been prompted by his own experience, when as a youth player he had to switch from flank to hooker because he was too short. White reportedly insisted that "Watson would never make a side he coached".

By 2004 White was said to be against picking Burger and Watson in the same team, Although he had shown "sensational form" in 2004, Watson was again ignored by White and selectors Andre Markgraaff and Pieter Jooste in favour of Solly Tyibilika, who had lost his position to Watson at the Sharks during the season. Some believe that White's preference for Burger motivated Watson's 2005 move to Cape Town, where he could prove himself against Burger in the Western Province team.

==== Non-selection for Springboks, 2006 ====
Watson showed such good form in the 2006 Super 14 competition that he received that year's Vodacom Super Rugby Player of the Tournament award. According to statistics compiled by the New Zealand company Verusco, Watson was the second best openside flanker in the 2006 Super 14 competition, preceded only by Richie McCaw and followed by Phil Waugh.

Despite Watson's form during that season, national coach Jake White again preferred 2004 IRB Player of the Year Burger over Watson, this time for the No. 6 position in the Springbok squad. At the time White stated that Watson offered limited options, and that South Africa had many quality loose forwards who offer more. White said in 2009 of Watson: "I don't think he's a good rugby player. He is a most overrated player". By contrast McCaw described Watson in 2006 as "an excellent player" and "perhaps...unlucky not to be part of the Springbok set-up".

White repeatedly emphasised the need for tall loose-forwards who could add extra line-out options. Similar sentiments regarding stature, while not aimed at Watson specifically, had been expressed by other rugby pundits. Italy coach and former Springbok coach Nick Mallett has been a supporter of Watson. When asked in 2008 why in his opinion the Springboks won the 2007 World Cup, Mallett told an audience that the reason the Springboks won was because Schalk Burger is the smallest player in the Springboks' forward pack. Schalk Burger is 1,93m tall, while Watson is 1,84m. And in March 2008 SA Rugby Magazine quoted newly appointed Springbok coach Peter de Villiers as saying: "A small talented guy will always be better than a big untalented guy, and a big talented guy is better than a small talented guy. I will select the best player for the job". After Jake White's preferred selections won the 2007 World Cup, England line-out specialist Ben Kay was quoted as saying: "Their line-out was fantastic and was a major difference between the two teams. They have been the best line-out in the world for many years and gave us enormous problems."

White's public stance against shorter loose forwards was contradicted in November 2006 when he included Kabamba Floors for the Springbok squad against England in the place of an injured Pierre Spies. At 1.75m Floors is 9 cm shorter than Watson. White admitted at the time that his view that Floors also was too short had been incorrect.

SARU president Oregan Hoskins, certain journalists and Watson himself at the time accused White of personal bias. For them, Watson's non-selection was due partly to the fact that his father Daniel "Cheeky" Watson was a former anti-apartheid activist, who alienated himself from the SA Rugby establishment by playing club rugby in the 'black' townships of Eastern Province at a time when this was illegal in terms of racist apartheid legislation. Watson claimed that Mike Howe, one of his coaches at Grey High School, had told him while he was still a student there that White had made derogatory comments about Watson. Cheeky Watson suggested that Howe had influenced White against Luke – a charge Howe denies. The elder Watson said that White, while the coach of the Under-21 national team, had told a South African Rugby Football Union before witnesses that he would not select Luke " 'because he would come with his father's baggage' ".

Hoskins explained that he interfered in Watson's 2007 selection because "the relationship between the two was extremely strained for a very long time. It had gone past the breaking point and I felt the player was being prejudiced".

White dismissed the charge of bias in 2006, claiming that his reasons were purely rugby-related and that he had "no personal issues with anybody".

==== SA Sports Illustrated interview, 2006 ====
Apart from his objections to what he perceived as Watson's limited skills and lack of stature, White implied that Watson was not a team player, and would have been a divisive influence on the Springbok team if selected.

White's accusation that Watson was divisive was no doubt supported by Watson's public criticism of Jake White in a 2006 SA Sports Illustrated article. Watson accused White of a "lack of integrity", as White had "attacked Schalk Brits" for wanting to play professionally in England, yet he himself had "tried to hold SA Rugby to ransom with an overseas offer". Watson also questioned the credentials of captain John Smit and he said there was no longer any pride and passion in the Springbok squad. Watson reportedly said: "Obviously I would love to play for the Springboks, but I do not want to find myself in a position where I'm compromising my beliefs in equality, integrity and honour to achieve that goal." Watson's comments in the 2006 SA Sports Illustrated interview revealed his own negative feeling at the time towards White, captain John Smit and the squad. When Watson was finally selected as a Springbok in 2007 and was asked in media interviews to comment on his earlier public criticisms, he maintained that he stood by what he had said a year earlier.

Watson's comments raised concerns that he could be charged by SARU for "bringing the game into disrepute", a broadly defined transgression that can be used to sanction players and officials who make negative public statements. For example, in 2000 then-national coach Nick Mallett was charged for publicly criticising SARU for "greed" in inflating Test match ticket prices. White himself had been threatened with sanctions for breaching this regulation.

No action was apparently taken by SARU against Watson for bringing the game into disrepute, nor any explanation provided why it had not done so. Springboks or officials are not always charged for making negative public comments about teammates. Smit was not sanctioned for his "cancerous effect" comments about Watson, for example. "Bringing the game into disrepute" is so broadly defined that it has been used to remove players or officials that have fallen into disfavour. The Independent's correspondent suggested that such an internal settling of scores had happened to Mallet. By reaffirming his 2006 position after his 2007 selection, Watson may have breached the Springbok code of conduct according to which a player undertakes not to discredit or insult a Springbok teammate. But a player makes this commitment to the code when senior teammates initiate new Springboks after their debut game, and Watson's teammates had refused to initiate him.

==== Resolution ====
In October 2008 White was said to have reconciled with Watson by shaking hands with him at a service of the Hillsong Church in Cape Town that both then attended. White was quoted as saying " 'I feel sorry for Luke...and it is not for me to judge him". White's actions were ascribed to his conversion to Christianity.

=== SA Rugby Players' Association's 2006 player of the year award ===
Due to his good form in 2006, Watson was nominated for awards as the Players' Player of the Year, Super 14 Player of the Year, and Currie Cup Player of the Year. Rugby journalist Mark Keohane reported that on the morning of Monday 30 October 2006 Watson had been confirmed as the winner. But the decision was overturned later the same day and awarded to Free State loose forward Kabamba Floors. Players' Association chair Piet Heymans said that Floors had won by 8 votes when voting closed at 5pm on Monday. Heymans' assertion was placed in doubt when SARU revealed that the vote had actually been tied, and that SARU president Oregan Hoskins had cast the deciding vote in favour of Floors to break the deadlock. Keohane questioned why SARU's leadership became involved in what was the voting prerogative of players. He alleged that White and Hoskins had intervened when it appeared that Watson would win, and that in this context the Players' Association had demanded a recount. Keohane suggested that a joint award would have had precedent in that the Currie Cup had been shared among teams who were tied at the end of the season.

=== Politicised Springbok selection, 2007 ===
In May 2007 White and selectors Pieter Jooste and Ian Macintosh, the former national coach, submitted a list of 45 players to the South African Rugby Union for the Springbok training squad. After White's list was submitted, Watson was added to the list without Jake White's knowledge by SARU President Hoskins, fellow SARU executive council member Koos Basson, and Springbok team manager Zola Yeye – a long-time friend of the Watson family. Hoskins later said in an interview with Talk Radio 702 host John Robbie that he had added Watson because Watson was South Africa's 2006 Super 14 Player of the Year. Politicians such as Butana Komphela, ANC chairman of the parliamentary sports portfolio committee, and the then-Western Cape Premier Ebrahim Rasool, also insisted on Watson's inclusion. Rasool went so far as to say that Watson should be regarded as a "black player" based on his father's anti-apartheid contribution, and that he should therefore be included in the Springbok team ahead of "white players of equal talent".

Jake White considered legal action if the SARU executive interfered further with his final team selection. However, White eventually accepted SARU's decision to include Watson in the Springboks. The senior players then refused to include him in the traditional initiation ceremony for newly capped players, due to the nepotistic manner of his selection.

In his autobiography In Black and White – The Jake White Story, White mentions that he was approached at the start of the 2007 international season by lawyer Brian Biebuyck on behalf of the Watson family. Biebuyck, who was also White's lawyer at the time, passed a nine-point proposal to White. These included the selection of Watson in the World Cup squad; in return, White's contract with SA Rugby would be extended beyond the 2007 World Cup. Failure to select Luke Watson would result in him losing his job before the World Cup. White claims that the Watsons subsequently backed down. Luke's father, Cheeky Watson, has denied these claims.

Watson made his controversial Springbok debut against Manu Samoa on 9 June 2007 but made little impression, and was substituted early in the second half after sustaining a rib injury.

Watson's father has since told South African newspapers that Luke never wanted to play for the Springboks under White. Watson Snr also boycotted his son's capping ceremony, apparently in protest against White's attitude towards his son. An unknown media source criticized Watson for being "hypocritical in taking up his forced selection" against Samoa, given his public opinions about White and Smit.

The nature of the relationship between Watson and his teammates for the test against Samoa can be gauged from reports that the senior Springboks "had refused to initiate him into the squad", saying that Yeye, Stofile, and Hoskins should do it instead.

As part of his forced selection Watson was included in the tour to Australia and New Zealand for the away leg of the Tri-Nations series, as White rested many of his first-choice players. Watson withdrew from the tour pleading a rib injury which was estimated to need about 10 days to heal. But Watson turned out for Western Province in the Currie Cup on the same day as the first of the Tri-Nations matches. Convener of Springbok selectors Jooste expressed surprise at how quickly Watson had recovered. Andy Marinos, SARU's manager of national teams, cleared Watson to play for his province, saying that uncertainty about the length of Watson's recovery time had prompted the national selectors to omit him. Watson had been assessed by the provincial team doctor and passed a fitness test. Watson was dropped from the national squad, and did not take part in the World Cup. Injured for most of the season, he hardly featured in the 2007 Currie Cup.

After the non-selection controversy of 2006 and the politicised-selection controversy of 2007, Watson was firmly established in the media spotlight, and aspects of his behaviour now became subject to more media scrutiny than for other players.

=== Stormers captaincy, 2007 ===
The coach of the Stormers team in 2007, Kobus van der Merwe, appointed Watson as captain for their Super Rugby campaign. The relationship between coach and captain was not always straightforward. For example, Van der Merwe substituted Watson after 60 minutes of a Super 14 match in April 2007 while the Stormers were being heavily defeated by the Blue Bulls. Watson appeared confused while being substituted, and did not attend the post-match press conference. The following day Watson was still in the dark as to why he was substituted. Van der Merwe first said that he wanted to try a new combination as the match was already lost, but later told Watson that he wanted to rest him. According to some reporters the player and coach clashed in the dressing room after the match, but Watson denied that he and Van der Merwe had problems.

In December 2007 new Stormers coach Rassie Erasmus replaced Watson with Springbok backline veteran Jean de Villiers as captain of the Stormers. Watson retained his place in the Stormers' team. Some commentators suggested that one reason why Watson was relieved of the captaincy was that his leadership skills had been criticized by various senior players.

Earlier rumors in the press had suggested that Burger would replace Watson as captain for the 2008 Super 14 tournament.

Reportedly the original decision was revisited after Erasmus met with Luke's father, Dan Watson, to discuss "the role that he [Luke Watson] should play in the Stormers' side". Dan Watson allegedly said "that he had no problem with Luke not captaining the side, provided Schalk Burger did not have a higher profile" than Luke. Erasmus was said to be concerned that Burger, despite his star status, should not be treated differently from his teammates. Previously Erasmus had opined that a good leader does not polarize opinion, and does not make waves or headlines.

Just hours after being officially relieved of the Stormers captaincy Watson breached the terms of the team's Adidas sponsorship contract by wearing rival Nike logos at an official training session. The matter was dealt with internally.

Despite his sacking as captain, Watson scored most tries (5) for the Stormers in the 2007 Super rugby season, only the second forward after Bobby Skinstad to achieve this accomplishment between 1998 and 2011.

In September 2008 Watson was also replaced by De Villiers as captain of the Western Province side under coach Allister Coetzee. Watson had been appointed Western Province captain on 1 June 2006, and had occupied the position 33 times by 14 June 2009.

=== Speech at Ubumbo rugby festival, 2008 ===
On 3 October 2008 Watson delivered a speech at the Ubumbo rugby festival at the University of Cape Town. He spoke about his family's political record, and described wearing the Springbok jersey as "a burden" and said he had to struggle "to keep myself from vomiting on it." Watson said that his Springbok teammates refused to associate with him after his forced inclusion in the team in 2007. Although Watson gave no context to his comments, some have inferred that he was referring to the controversy over the retention of the Springbok emblem for national sports teams.

In a question and answer session after the speech Watson allegedly stated that he hated losing his place in the Bok team to an Afrikaner (Schalk Burger, a former IRB Player of the Year). He also allegedly quoted his father as saying that the rugby administration was "rotten to the core" and run by "Dutchmen." Afrikaners associate the term with pejorative attitudes towards them by British colonists and their descendants, connoting lack of intelligence and low breeding. No reference to Burger or to "Dutchmen" occur in the transcript of his speech.

Watson's words completely contradicted sentiments that he had expressed in his 2006 interview with SA Sports Illustrated magazine, when he had said: "It (the Springbok emblem) has the potential and it has the ability to become one of the most powerful emblems this world has seen. … It stands for equality. It stands for unity. It stands for a once divided nation that now stands together. It stands for everything this world doesn't have, and everything this world wants". Watson added that "Playing for the Boks would be a great honour" and that "Obviously I would love to play for the Springboks".

Rugby journalist Gavin Rich speculated that Watson's change of heart between 2006 and 2008 was due to his experiences as "the unwanted Player No 46". Rich felt that Watson was fighting a battle on behalf of others, and expressed "sorrow that we may never get to see the real Luke Watson, only the one that has been created in his father's image".

Journalist Andrew Austin summed up the reactions to the speech by noting how in general terms Watson's story reveals ongoing divides between Afrikaans- and English-speaking South Africans, as well as between those designated "whites" and "blacks".

The ANC's parliamentary sports committee chair, Butana Khompela, on 9 October seized on the event to demand the replacement of the Springbok.

Soon after the contents of the speech was made public the Pro-Afrikaans Action Group condemned Watson's comments as hate-speech, while the civil rights group AfriForum considered pressing charges against him on the same grounds.

A number of senior players reportedly threatened to boycott the 2008 end of year tour to England, Wales and Scotland if Watson was included in the squad. But Andy Marinos, then acting managing director of SARU, dismissed the reports as "speculation" and said that they were "utterly groundless".

When Watson made his first playing appearance after the incident, in a friendly warm-up match against English club Saracens at Newlands in January 2009, he was repeatedly booed by his home crowd. This treatment continued for at least three games into the Super 14 tournament and reached a climax in the Stormers fixture against the Blue Bulls at Loftus Versfeld in Pretoria. Watson's detractors branded him "Luke the Puke" on various social media sites on the internet.

The head of SARU's legal affairs department, Christo Ferreira, commented in public media that Watson could be charged of breach of SARU's code of conduct and fined, suspended or warned if found guilty. SARU appointed lawyer Dekker Govender to conduct a preliminary investigation into the incident. On 14 October 2008 the Ubombo Rugby wrote in a letter to Govender that Watson had not said anything that was racist or defamatory. Watson eventually appeared before a disciplinary hearing, which was abandoned on a technical legal matter, and SARU decided to drop the matter entirely.

== Later senior career ==
=== Further international selection, 2008–09 ===
Following the appointment in January 2008 of Peter de Villiers as the new coach of the Springbok rugby team, Watson was selected for nine more Test caps. Critics continued to question his performance at test level throughout the year with comments that his performances were "ordinary" and "anonymous". Eventually De Villiers relegated Watson to a substitute role, and reverted instead to the flankers whom Jake White had been criticised for preferring to Watson, namely Schalk Burger and Juan Smith. Even as a substitute Watson made no impact, and a number of journalists criticized him for not living up to expectations on the field. Two said, "Like a dirty smell, he has tended to hang around in this year's [TriNations] tournament."

As in 2007, Watson's teammates were less than flattering in their assessment of his 2008 contributions to the national team. John Smit, Watson's Springbok captain, said in his autobiography (The Captain in the Cauldron) that Watson was referred to as the " ' "cancer" of the team' " and was the primary reason for the Springboks' poor performances in the 2008 TriNations tournament. Springbok vice-captain Victor Matfield said that during his stand-in captaincy in 2008 "I did my best to involve Luke in all the activities". He had invited Watson to contribute but Watson "didn't want to". Matfield also stated, "It is untrue that the other players didn't try to accept him. It is rather a case of Luke never wanting to be part of the Springbok set-up." Matfield revealed that many players had complained about Watson.

Watson dismissed the claims after the publication of Smit's autobiography in 2009, saying that it was not possible for one player to so badly affect a 40-member squad. While acknowledging that Smit had done " 'incredibly well with South Africa' " he concluded that Smit's statements were " 'a cop-out' ".

On 24 October 2008, the day before the announcement of the Bok squad to tour Europe, Watson declared himself unavailable for selection. His form at the time was considered so poor that he stood little chance of making the squad on merit.

=== Super Rugby season, 2009 ===
Watson had a better season in the 2009 Super 14, and speculation arose again that he might be selected to face the British and Irish Lions. Former Springbok captain Corné Krige said in April 2009 that Watson was playing "unbelievable rugby" and that he would pick him on form as " 'among the best fetchers in the Super 14' ", but not at eighthman.

When a Springbok squad was named in May 2009 to face a Namibian team in a warm-up for the Lions tour, Watson was omitted. According to then-Springbok coach De Villiers, Watson was not selected because he was neither the best nor the second best player in his position (8th Man). Stephen Jones, a rugby correspondent for The Times who was following the Lions tour, described Watson as "nothing more than a Currie Cup player" and as a "second or third choice" for a Guinness Premiership club. Jones also described father Cheeky Watson as "just another version of a pushy parent".

Watson shone in the 2009 Currie Cup in the absence of the Springboks, and won the "Currie Cup Player of the Year" award.

=== Bath Rugby career, 2009–11 ===
Watson left South Africa to join Bath Rugby in November 2009, when the club was lying 11th of the 12 teams in the Guinness Premiership table after losing key players to drug controversy during the June 2009 off-season. Coming off the bench on his debut for Bath in November 2009, Watson scored a decisive try against the Ospreys.

In contrast to Jones' predictions, Watson became one of the outstanding players of the 2009–10 Guinness Premiership. During December 2009 he won the Man of the Match award for his performance against Edinburgh. Bath ended 4th in the 2009–10 Premiership. Despite this, Jones refused to retract his earlier statement, perhaps due to the dislike he formed for Watson on the Lions Tour.

At the start of the 2010–11 season Watson earned the captaincy of his premiership club, replacing fellow South African Michael Claassens who had declined to occupy the position for a second season. He suffered a neck injury that required him to spend the night in hospital, while a "ridiculously niggly foot injury" sustained against Harlequins in October 2010 sidelined Watson for two months. Despite playing with some discomfort, Watson returned to premiership rugby when he led his side to a win against London Irish on 1 January 2011. Watson was nominated for the 2011 Gatorade Performance of the Season Award for his contribution to Bath's game against Leicester Tigers on 23 October 2010. By December 2010 Watson had played 29 games in all and scored three tries for Bath.

Facing none of the controversy that surrounded him in South Africa, Watson's play was hailed as "inspirational" by Bath's head coach, Steve Meehan. Meehan also noted Watson's popularity off the field.

=== Eastern Province Kings, 2011– ===
Watson announced in December 2010 that he would leave Bath Rugby to join the Eastern Province Kings, the South African provincial side based in Watson's former home town, Port Elizabeth and the team where he started his career in 2002 when they were known as the Mighty Elephants. The Kings won the 2010 Currie Cup First Division just before Watson signed and were the base union of the Southern Kings, a Super Rugby franchise that would represent South Africa as the South African Kings in the IRB Nations Cup in Romania in June 2011 and play Super Rugby in 2013. He said that the "decision to leave Bath Rugby was the hardest of my life", but dismissed claims that his move was influenced by his father Cheeky's position as president of the Eastern Province Rugby Union. Instead, he credited Southern Kings' coach Alan Solomons (assistant Springbok coach under Mallett) for his decision.

Watson's move coincided with his signing in May 2011 as the first client of Shane Keohane's new sports management agency, which is part of Highbury Safika Media. Highbury's Chief Operating Officer at the time was Mark Keohane and the company publishes SA Rugby magazine.

On the playing field, his first appearances for the side came during the 2011 IRB Nations Cup, as the team – playing as the South African Kings – won all three matches to win the competition. Watson played in their 31–17 victory over Georgia and their 27–23 victory over Romania. In domestic action, he started in nine of the Eastern Province Kings' matches during the 2011 Currie Cup First Division season, scoring seven tries – the joint-highest by a forward in the competition – including two tries in their match against the Border Bulldogs as the Kings finished second on the log and losing 43–12 to table-toppers Boland Cavaliers in the final. Watson was available for the title run-in, however, sustaining a knock to the head in training prior to their semi-final match against the Falcons, ruling him out of the semi-finals and final with concussion.

He sustained a shoulder injury in the build-up to the 2012 season which ruled him out of the entire 2012 Vodacom Cup competition. He returned to action in the 2012 Currie Cup First Division in July 2012. Despite being restricted to just seven starts, Watson scored 13 tries during the Kings' campaign. He scored hat-tricks in their matches against the Falcons and the Griffons and two tries in each of their matches against the Border Bulldogs, Boland Cavaliers and the Pumas. He missed three rounds of the competition with a rib injury and suffered a broken ankle in their semi-final match against the Leopards. Despite his absence, the Kings won the final of the competition, beating the Pumas 26–25 in Port Elizabeth, but failed to gain promotion to the Premier Division, losing to the Free State Cheetahs in a two-legged promotion/relegation play-off.

Watson was named captain of the Southern Kings Super Rugby squad for their inaugural season in the competition in 2013. He played in their first ever game – a 22–10 victory over the Force in Port Elizabeth – but suffered a throat injury in the 32nd minute, was substituted off and subsequently missed their next six matches. He returned to the starting line-up for the home match against the Bulls, but looked unfit and had a poor game. He started the next two matches against the Cheetahs and the Waratahs from the substitutes' bench before returning to the starting line-up for the matches against the Highlanders – where he scored two tries in a 34–27 victory – and the Cheetahs. He was ruled out of the Stormers match with flu and then suffered an ankle fracture that ruled him out of the remainder of the season.

He finally returned to action in August 2014 after more than a year out. Due to the Currie Cup's expansion from six to eight teams, the Eastern Province Kings found themselves in the Premier Division of the competition after a long absence. Watson played in two matches for the Kings – a 16–35 opening day defeat to former side Western Province, during which Watson took just 33 minutes to score his first try for the EP Kings after injury and a 30–25 loss to the Blue Bulls in Pretoria. However, the injury curse struck again and Watson missed the remainder of the 2014 through a serious concussion.

== See also ==
- Springbok Rugby
- Rugby World Cup
