= Dan Qeqe =

Dan Dumile Qeqe (died 2005) was a prominent sports administrator who struggled to establish non-racial sport in the Eastern Cape province of South Africa. When the Bantu Administration Board denied him access for black teams to sports grounds, he rallied the community to build his own rugby stadium.

== History ==
Qeqe joined Spring Rose Rugby Football Club in the 1950s after leaving Fort Beaufort for Port Elizabeth.

During the 1970s Dan Qeqe administered non-racial rugby and cricket in the Eastern Cape. Qeqe also campaigned for better living conditions. He was harassed and detained by the Security Branch of the South African Police. After the Bantu Administration Board denied the Kwazakele Rugby Union (Kwaru) access to sports grounds, Qeqe led the fight to build his own stadium.

As a deacon of the Edward Memorial Congregational Church, he also helped to build two churches in Motherwell and KwaMagxaki townships.

Qeqe resigned from membership of the Port Elizabeth Joint Advisory Board, which he came to see as ineffective.

Qeqe remained Spring Rose's club treasurer up to his death.
