= Agustín Pichot =

Argentina rugby union player and executive

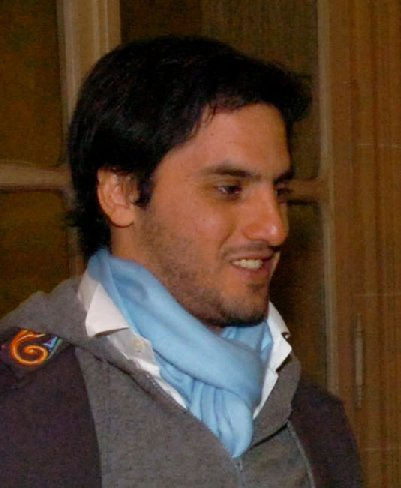
- Pichot at the Casa Rosada in 2007

Vice-chairman of World Rugby
- In office 1 July 2016 – 12 May 2020
- Preceded by: Oregan Hoskins
- Succeeded by: Bernard Laporte

Member of Board of Directors of UAR
- Incumbent
- Assumed office 1 July 2009
- Born: Agustín Pichot; 22 August 1974 (age 52) Buenos Aires, Argentina
- Height: 1.77 m (5 ft 10 in)
- Weight: 77 kg (12 st 2 lb; 170 lb)

Rugby union career
- Position: Scrum-half
Senior career
Years	Team	Apps	(Points)
2009	Paris		
2007–2008	Racing Métro		
2003–2007	Paris		
1999–2003	Bristol	65	(48)
1997–1999	Richmond	25	(35)
1992–1997	CASI		
- Correct as of 2011-08-23
International career
Years	Team	Apps	(Points)
1995–2008	Argentina	71	(60)
- Correct as of 2011-08-23
National sevens team
Years	Team		Comps
1994–2002	Argentina		7
- Correct as of 12 March 2007

Agustín Pichot (born 22 August 1974) is an Argentine retired rugby union player and executive. He was the captain of the Argentine team and the English club Bristol. He also played for French sides Stade Français and Racing Métro after leaving Argentine team CASI from San Isidro in 1997. In 2011, he was inducted into the IRB Hall of Fame. He was vice-chairman of World Rugby between 2016 and 2020.

Pichot also owns PEGSA, an television company that produces sports broadcasts and studio shows for ESPN Latin America, and is an executive of Australian mining and energy company Fortescue.

== Playing career ==
Pichot made his debut for Los Pumas in April 1996 during the Pumas' tour to Australia, scoring a try in the first Test in Brisbane. Pichot was capped another three times that year for the Pumas; playing in Tests against Romania, Italy and France during October. The following year he was capped another three times for Argentina, playing two Tests against France and one against Uruguay in June, scoring a try in the match against Uruguay. In October/November of the next year, he earned another four Test caps, playing in matches against Italy, France and the Wallabies, scoring a try in the second of two matches against the Wallabies. He moved from CASI to Richmond, and later switched to Bristol.

Pichot would be capped six times during the 1998 international season, including playing France three times, as well as playing matches against Italy, Romania and Wales, scoring tries in the games against Wales and Romania. In the lead up to the 1999 Rugby World Cup in Wales Pichot played two Tests against the hosts in June, and Tests against Scotland and Ireland that August, scoring a try in the Test against Ireland. He played five matches during the World Cup and helped the Pumas reach the quarter-finals. Argentina played France in their quarter-final, which France won 26–47, Pichot being one of Argentina's try scorers in the match.

After the World Cup Pichot captained Argentina for the first time in a Test against Ireland in June 2000, which Argentina won 34 points to 23. He was also capped another four times that year, playing two games against World Champions Australia and then matches against South Africa and England in November. He earned eight Test caps during 2001, and captained Argentina on three more occasions, in matches against Uruguay, the United States and Canada in May. He played six Tests the following year, captaining the Pumas during two of them (June Tests against England and South Africa).

Pichot then moved to Paris club Stade Français in 2003. He played two Tests during August 2003, including captaining the Pumas against Uruguay. He was named captain for the opening match of the 2003 Rugby World Cup against hosts Australia. The Wallabies won the match 24–8. He also scored tries in the pool matches against Uruguay and Canada. He then captained the team in the last pool game against Ireland, which they lost 16–15. He was named to Argentina's 2007 Rugby World Cup squad, which he captained successfully to a 3rd place showing in the World Cup, after a second win in the 2007 Rugby World Cup against France in the 3rd/4th place playoff.

Pichot was the first foreign captain of a French team that won the French championship in 2007.

He spent the 2007–2008 season with Racing Métro, then in Rugby Pro D2, before retiring. Pichot briefly came out of retirement for one last stint with Stade Français in 2009. However, an injury suffered in April 2009 that ended his 2008–09 season led Pichot to call time on his playing career.

Pichot returned to Argentina for one final match on 27 June at CASI, an informal exhibition divided into three periods that saw nearly 60 players take the pitch, including many of his former CASI teammates and past and present Pumas. He was the only player to remain on the field through the match. Also present were Alex Wyllie, who coached the Pumas to their first World Cup quarterfinal in 1999; Marcelo Loffreda, the Pumas' coach for their 2007 World Cup run; and Pichot's successor as Pumas captain, Felipe Contepomi, who was unable to play as he was recovering from a torn ACL. Every player on the pitch wore #9, the standard number for starting scrum-halves.

He narrated the Argentine version of the documentary Earth.

On 24 October 2011, at the IRB Awards ceremony in Auckland, Pichot was inducted into the IRB Hall of Fame alongside 18 other key figures in the history of the Rugby World Cup.

== Rugby administration ==
Pichot's boardroom career began in 2009 following an overhaul of the Argentine Rugby Union, known as UAR, which changed its long-standing amateur status and moved towards rugby as a professional game in Argentina. He became a member of the UAR Council that year, while still in his final season of rugby in France, and went on to be the driving force behind Argentina's integration into The Rugby Championship and Super Rugby.

In 2016, less than a year after being elected Vice Chairman of World Rugby, Pichot was making waves, calling for the three-year residency rule for eligibility to play for a country to be extended to five years, in the face of the view of other senior members of the WR Executive Committee. A few months later, he was voted most influential figure in world rugby, ahead of England head coach Eddie Jones, in a ranking by Rugby World magazine.

Pichot stood for election as World Rugby chairman in 2020 but, following his loss to incumbent Bill Beaumont by 28 votes to 23, he vacated his seat on the World Rugby council.

== Honours ==
- In 1995 he received the Olimpia Award for rugby
- In 1998 he received Best Rugby Player
- In 1999 he received Sportsman Clarín Award of the year
- In 2000 he received the Platinum Konex Award for Rugby
- In 2000 he again received the Olimpia Award
- In 2001 he received Best Rugby player
- In 2000/01 and 2002/03 he was voted Supporter's Player of the Season at Bristol Shoguns
- In 2010, once again he received the Platinum Konex Award for rugby
- IRB Hall of Fame Class of 2011

== Achievements ==
- 75 tests with the Pumas
- Finals of the European Cup 2004/05
- Finals of the French Championship 2005 (Championnat de France de rugby)
- Finals of the English Cup 2001
- Champion of France 2004 and 2007 (captain)
- 5th position in 1999 Rugby World Cup
- 3rd position in 2007 Rugby World Cup
- Captain and 3 position in 2001 Rugby World Cup Sevens
- Argentine Provincial Champion with Buenos Aires 1996
- Argentine National Club Champion with CASI
- Sevens National Champion with Buenos Aires 1994/1995
- Most selected Argentine player for the Barbarians

== Trivia ==
- Pichòt means "little" in Occitan.
