= Louit =

- Commune
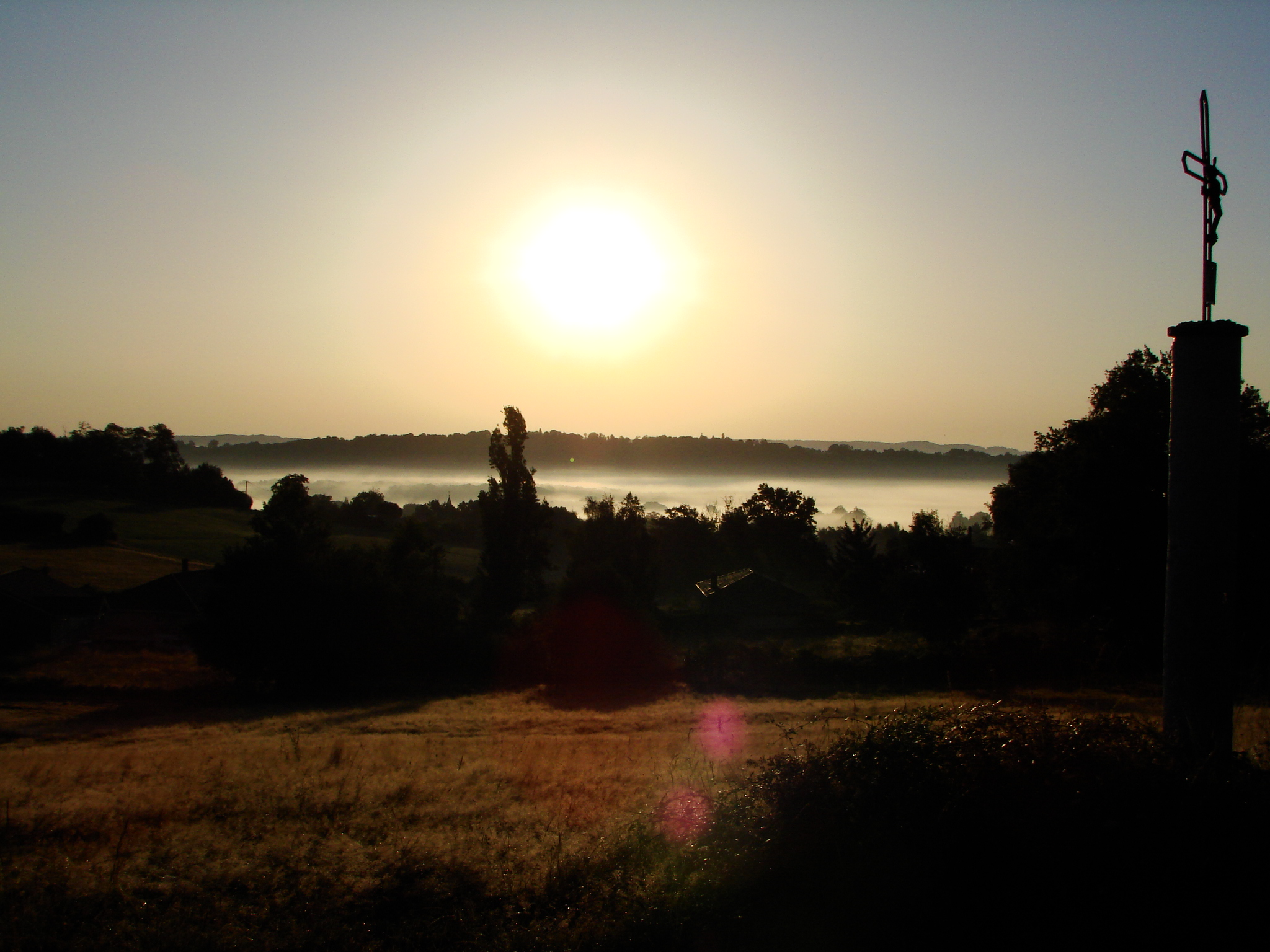
- A view of the village in the morning mist

- Coat of arms
- Location of Louit
- Location within France Location within Occitanie
- Coordinates: 43°18′13″N 0°09′22″E
- Country: France
- Region: Occitania
- Department: Hautes-Pyrénées
- Arrondissement: Tarbes
- Canton: Les Coteaux
- Intercommunality: Coteaux du Val-d'Arros

Government
  - Mayor (2020–2026): André Trinc
- Area^{1}: 5.04 km^{2} (1.95 sq mi)
- Elevation: 258 m (846 ft)
- Highest elevation: 353 m (1,158 ft)
- Lowest elevation: 240 m (790 ft)
- Population (2023): 194
  - Density: 38.5/km^{2} (99.7/sq mi)
- Time zone: UTC+01:00 (CET)
  - Summer (DST): UTC+02:00 (CEST)
- INSEE/Postal code: 65285 /65350
- ^{1} French Land Register data, which excludes lakes, ponds, glaciers > 1 km^{2} (0.386 sq mi or 247 acres) and river estuaries.

Louit is a commune in the Hautes-Pyrénées department in south-western France.

== See also ==
- Communes of the Hautes-Pyrénées department
