= 2031 Men's Rugby World Cup =

12th edition of the Men's Rugby World Cup

- Bid logo. 31 refers to Men's 2031 and 33 to Women's 2033 RWC.

Tournament details
- Host nation: United States
- Dates: 3-5 October – 14-16 November 2031
- No. of nations: 24

The 2031 Men's Rugby World Cup will be the 12th edition of the Men's Rugby World Cup, the quadrennial world championship for men's rugby union teams. It is scheduled to take place in the United States. This will be the first time the tournament is held in the Americas.

== Host nation selection ==
USA Rugby officially launched their bid to host the 2027 or 2031 editions of the Men's Rugby World Cup in October 2021, while in February the same year, England, Wales, Scotland and Ireland had considered a joint bid to host the 2031 edition. At the time, the United States was the only bidder for the 2031 Rugby World Cup and the following month (November 2021) were in an "exclusive targeted dialogue" with World Rugby with regard to hosting the 2031 edition.

In April 2022, President Joe Biden sent a letter of support to World Rugby affirming his support for the bid. On May 12, 2022, World Rugby announced that it had awarded both the 2031 Men's and 2033 Women's Rugby World Cup to the United States.

2031 Rugby World Cup bidding results
Nation	Votes
United States	Acclamation

== Development and preparations ==
=== Expansion and format ===
The tournament will use the 24-team format adopted for the 2027 tournament in Australia, with six pools consisting of four teams, and a round of 16 prior to the quarter-finals. A total of 52 matches will be played over the course of six weeks.

=== Dates ===
The Rugby World Cup typically takes place from September to October. In the United States, this would overlap with the 2031 National Football League season and the 2031 Major League Soccer season. As many of the proposed venues are NFL stadiums, MLB stadiums and MLS stadiums, there is the possibility of the tournament being held during the summer months (June–September) to minimize clashes with other leagues' schedules, mainly that of the NFL. However, a determination of scheduling is yet to be made. (Note: The NFL regular season traditionally starts on the Thursday after Labor Day, a holiday fixed on the first Monday in September. Major League Baseball ends its regular season near the start of October, with playoffs running into early November. Major League Soccer prior to 2027 held its season entirely within a calendar year; its regular season ended in October, with the playoffs extending into December. This was changed in 2027 to align with the typical fall to spring schedule seen internationally.) Additional scheduling conflicts will arise as a result of the United States co-hosting the 2031 FIFA Women's World Cup in the summer.

On 19 November 2026, World Rugby announced the date window of the tournament. The event will kick off on the weekend of 3-5 October, with the final on the weekend of 14-16 November, placing it in both the 2031 NFL season, and 2031-32 MLS season.

=== Candidate cities ===
A total of 27 cities have been shortlisted for the 2031 Rugby World Cup. Most of the proposed venues are MLS and NFL stadiums. Among the 27 cities which are under consideration, 11 of them were selected as host cities for the 2026 FIFA World Cup. World Rugby chief Brett Robinson has said they expect to select 12-14 cities from which they can base matches in.

Shortlisted locations

Candidate Cities
City	State
Atlanta	Georgia
Baltimore	Maryland
Birmingham	Alabama
Boston	Massachusetts
Charlotte	North Carolina
Chicago	Illinois
Cincinnati	Ohio
Denver	Colorado
Houston	Texas
Kansas City	Missouri
Los Angeles	California
Miami	Florida
Minneapolis	Minnesota
Nashville	Tennessee
New Orleans	Louisiana
New York	New York
Orlando	Florida
Philadelphia	Pennsylvania
Phoenix	Arizona
Pittsburgh	Pennsylvania
Salt Lake City	Utah
San Diego	California
San Francisco Bay Area	California
Seattle	Washington
St Louis	Missouri
Vancouver	British Columbia, Canada
Washington, DC	Washington, DC

== Qualifying ==
The below table shows the qualified teams current until October, 2027:

Team	Qualification method	Date of qualification	Appearance(s)				Previous best performance (Note: Bold text indicates they hosted that edition.)	WR (Note: World ranking at start of tournament.)
Team	Qualification method	Date of qualification	Total	First	Last	Streak	Previous best performance	WR
United States	Host nation	12 May 2022	10th	1987	2027	2	Pool Stage (Eight times) (Note: Pool stages in 1987, 1991, 1999, 2003, 2007, 2011, 2015 and 2019.)	TBD

== See also ==
- 2033 Women's Rugby World Cup
- Rugby World Cup hosts
