= Bernard Laporte =

French rugby union player & administrator

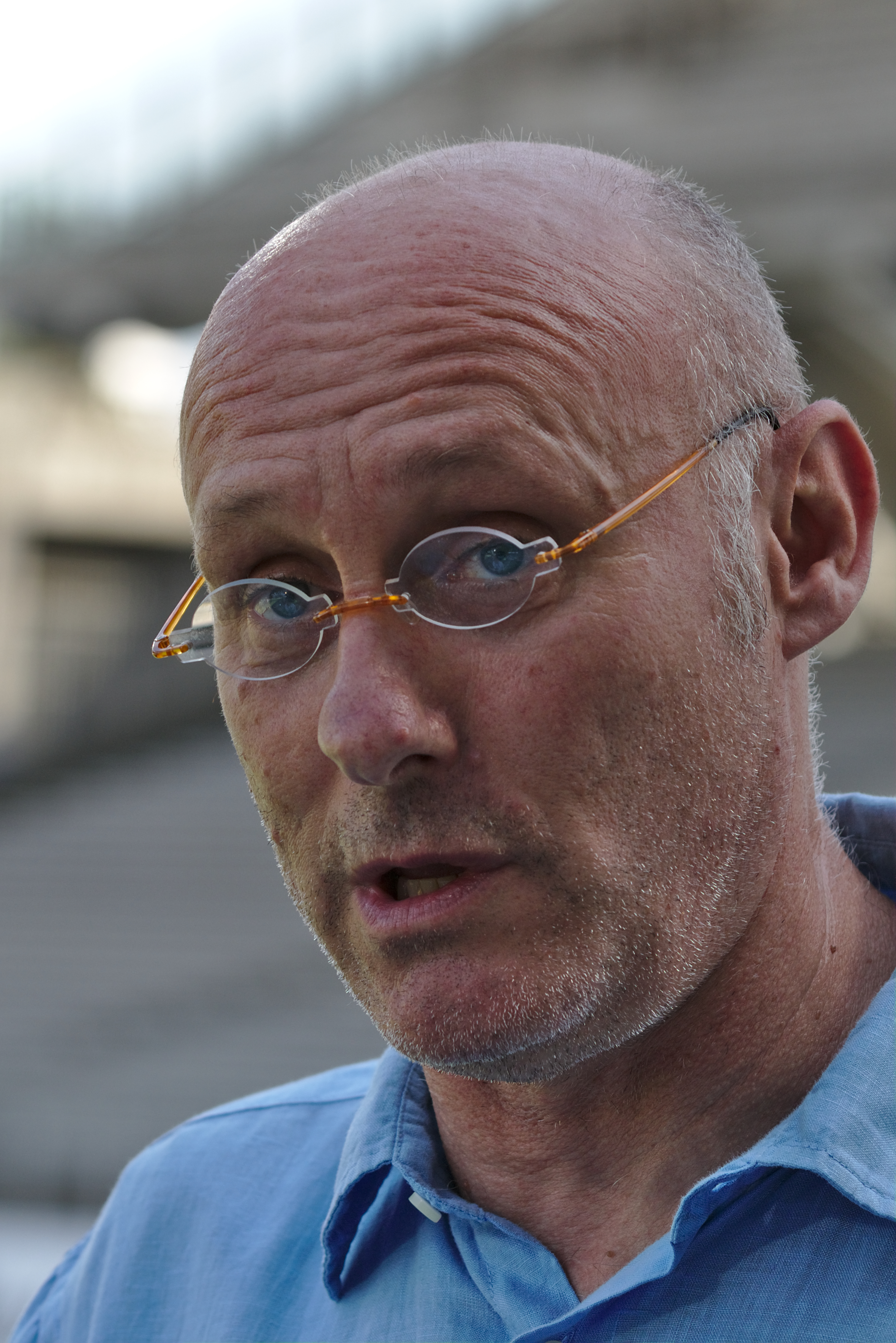

Vice-Chairman of World Rugby
- Incumbent
- Assumed office 12 May 2020
- Chairman: Bill Beaumont
- Preceded by: Agustín Pichot

President of French Rugby Federation
- In office 3 December 2016 – 27 January 2023
- Preceded by: Pierre Camou
- Succeeded by: Florian Grill

Secretary of State for Sport
- In office 22 October 2007 – 23 June 2009
- President: Nicolas Sarkozy
- Prime Minister: François Fillon
- Minister: Roselyne Bachelot
- Succeeded by: Rama Yade

Personal details
- Born: 7 January 1964 (age 62) Rodez, Aveyron, France

Rugby union career
- Position: Scrum-half
Amateur team(s)
Years	Team	Apps	(Points)
1980–1984	Gaillac		
1984–1993	Bordeaux-Bègles		
Coaching career
- Years: Team
- 1993–1996: Bordeaux-Bègles
- 1996–1999: Stade Français
- 1999–2007: France
- 2011–2016: Toulon
- 2023–: Montpellier (Director)

Bernard Laporte (born 1 July 1964) is a French rugby union coach, administrator and former player. Since 2023 he has been director of rugby at Montpellier. He served as French Secretary of State for Sport from 2007 to 2009, and was president of the French Rugby Federation from December 2016 to January 2023.

From 1999 to 2007, Laporte was the head coach of the France national team. He was the first fully professional head coach of France. He has also coached Bordeaux-Bègles, Stade Français and Toulon.

== Playing career ==
Laporte played rugby union at scrum-half and won the French Under-21 championship with UA Gaillac in 1983 and then again in 1984, in which he was captain. Seven years later he captained Begles-Bordeaux to the French championship (won the title in 1991).

== Early coaching roles ==
Laporte's first coaching role was in the early 1990s, when he was assistant coach of the Stade Bordelais University club between 1993 and 1995. He took over at Stade Français in 1995, who were in the third division at the time. He took them right up to the first division in three seasons, winning the respective championships. The club were crowned champions of France in 1998, when they defeated USA Perpignan 34–7 at Stade de France.

== Head coach of France ==
Laporte took over as head coach of the national team at the end of 1999. His first task was the 2000 Six Nations Championship, the first of its format, since the addition of Italy. Laporte drew on the experience of the 1999 Rugby World Cup, where France had been losing finalists (to Australia). Laporte named Fabien Pelous as captain. In France's first game under Laporte, they defeated Wales 36–3. France ended up winning three of their five matches which saw them finish second, behind winner England.

Laporte became renowned for his commitment to improving discipline; he even suspended captain Fabien Pelous once for foul play. Laporte said that discipline was not only important for team morale, but also for promoting the game of rugby:

I am trying to make them understand that these acts are inadmissible... If a player goes into the sinbin, his teammates have to fill in for him. I wanted [Pelous] to realise that by being yellow-carded he simply punishes his own team. ... We are talking about the future of our sport and if we want rugby to become more successful and more media friendly, we have to take a hard line on violence.

The following season, France fell to fifth place in the 2001 Six Nations Championship, winning only two of their five matches; against Scotland and Italy. However, the following year, Laporte took France to victory in the 2002 Six Nations Championship – not only winning the tournament, but completing a grand slam.

After the massive success at the 2002 Six Nations, France fell to third place in the subsequent tournament, though they still won three of their five matches. France finished top of their pool at the 2003 Rugby World Cup in Australia winning all four of their pool matches. France then defeated Ireland 43–21 in the quarter-finals to move into the semi-finals. They were defeated 24–7 by England in the semi-final and moved on to the third/fourth place play-off, which they lost to the All Blacks, and thus finished fourth at the World Cup.

After the strong showing at the World Cup, France reproduced their Six Nations success of 2002 at the 2004 Six Nations Championship. France won all five of their matches to win the tournament and complete another grand slam. France finished second, behind Wales in the 2005 Six Nations Championship, and the following year at the 2006 tournament, France won again, getting their third Six Nations trophy under Laporte.

After eight years in charge of the French national team, he resigned as coach following the 2007 Rugby World Cup. In his final Six Nations Championship in charge of France, his team won four out of their five games and emerged champions after edging out Ireland on points difference.

=== International matches as Head coach ===
Note: World Rankings Column shows the World Ranking France was placed at on the following Monday after each of their matches

Matches (2000–2007)
Matches	Date	Opposition	Venue	Score (Fra.–Opponent)	Competition	Captain	World Rank
2000
1	5 February	Wales	Millennium Stadium, Cardiff	36–3	2000 Six Nations	Fabien Pelous	N/A
2	19 February	England	Stade de France, Saint-Denis	9–15	2000 Six Nations	Fabien Pelous	N/A
3	4 March	Scotland	Murrayfield Stadium, Edinburgh	28–16	2000 Six Nations	Fabien Pelous	N/A
4	19 March	Ireland	Stade de France, Saint-Denis	25–27	2000 Six Nations	Fabien Pelous	N/A
5	1 April	Italy	Stade de France, Saint-Denis	42–31	2000 Six Nations	Fabien Pelous	N/A
6	28 May	Romania	Stadionul Dinamo, Bucharest	67–20	Test match	Abdelatif Benazzi	N/A
7	4 November	Australia	Stade de France, Saint-Denis	13–18	Autumn internationals	Fabien Pelous	N/A
8	11 November	New Zealand	Stade de France, Saint-Denis	26–39	Autumn internationals	Fabien Pelous	N/A
9	18 November	New Zealand	Stade Vélodrome, Marseille	42–33	Autumn internationals	Fabien Pelous	N/A
2001
10	4 February	Scotland	Stade de France, Saint-Denis	16–6	2001 Six Nations	Fabien Pelous	N/A
11	17 February	Ireland	Lansdowne Road, Dublin	15–22	2001 Six Nations	Fabien Pelous	N/A
12	3 March	Italy	Stadio Flaminio, Rome	30–19	2001 Six Nations	Fabien Pelous	N/A
13	17 March	Wales	Stade de France, Saint-Denis	35–43	2001 Six Nations	Fabien Pelous	N/A
14	7 April	England	Twickenham, London	19–48	2001 Six Nations	Fabien Pelous	N/A
15	16 June	South Africa	Ellis Park Stadium, Johannesburg	32–23	2001 tour	Fabien Galthié	N/A
16	23 June	South Africa	Kings Park Stadium, Durban	15–20	2001 tour	Fabien Galthié	N/A
17	30 June	New Zealand	Westpac Stadium, Wellington	12–37	2001 tour	Fabien Galthié	N/A
18	10 November	South Africa	Stade de France, Saint-Denis	20–10	Autumn internationals	Fabien Galthié	N/A
19	17 November	Australia	Stade Vélodrome, Marseille	14–13	Autumn internationals	Fabien Galthié	N/A
20	24 November	Fiji	Stade Geoffroy-Guichard, Saint-Étienne	77–10	Autumn internationals	Fabien Galthié	N/A
2002
21	2 February	Italy	Stade de France, Saint-Denis	33–12	2002 Six Nations	Olivier Magne	N/A
22	16 February	Wales	Millennium Stadium, Cardiff	37–33	2002 Six Nations	Raphaël Ibañez	N/A
23	2 March	England	Stade de France, Saint-Denis	20–15	2002 Six Nations	Fabien Galthié	N/A
24	23 March	Scotland	Murrayfield Stadium, Edinburgh	22–10	2002 Six Nations	Fabien Galthié	N/A
25	7 April	Ireland	Stade de France, Saint-Denis	44–5	2002 Six Nations	Fabien Galthié	N/A
26	15 June	Argentina	José Amalfitani Stadium, Buenos Aires	27–28	2002 tour	Raphaël Ibañez	N/A
27	22 June	Australia	Docklands Stadium, Melbourne	17–29	2002 tour	Fabien Pelous	N/A
28	29 June	Australia	Stadium Australia, Sydney	25–31	2002 tour	Raphaël Ibañez	N/A
29	9 November	South Africa	Stade Vélodrome, Marseille	30–10	Autumn internationals	Fabien Galthié	N/A
30	16 November	New Zealand	Stade de France, Saint-Denis	20–20	Autumn internationals	Fabien Galthié	N/A
31	23 November	Canada	Stade de France, Saint-Denis	35–3	Autumn internationals	Fabien Galthié	N/A
2003
32	15 February	England	Twickenham, London	17–25	2003 Six Nations	Fabien Galthié	N/A
33	23 February	Scotland	Stade de France, Saint-Denis	38–3	2003 Six Nations	Fabien Galthié	N/A
34	8 March	Ireland	Lansdowne Road, Dublin	12–15	2003 Six Nations	Fabien Pelous	N/A
35	23 March	Italy	Stadio Flaminio, Rome	53–27	2003 Six Nations	Fabien Pelous	N/A
36	29 March	Wales	Stade de France, Saint-Denis	33–5	2003 Six Nations	Fabien Pelous	N/A
37	14 June	Argentina	José Amalfitani Stadium, Buenos Aires	6–10	2003 tour	Fabien Galthié	N/A
38	20 June	Argentina	José Amalfitani Stadium, Buenos Aires	32–33	2003 tour	Fabien Galthié	N/A
39	28 June	New Zealand	Carisbrook, Dunedin	23–31	2003 tour	Fabien Galthié	N/A
40	22 August	Romania	Stade Félix-Bollaert, Lens	56–8	2003 RWC warm-up	Fabien Galthié	N/A
41	30 August	England	Stade Vélodrome, Marseille	17–16	2003 RWC warm-up	Fabien Galthié	N/A
42	6 September	England	Twickenham, London	14–45	2003 RWC warm-up	Raphaël Ibañez	N/A
43	11 October	Fiji	Lang Park, Brisbane, Australia	61–18	2003 Rugby World Cup	Fabien Galthié	5th
44	18 October	Japan	Dairy Farmers Stadium, Townsville, Australia	51–29	2003 Rugby World Cup	Fabien Galthié	5th
45	25 October	Scotland	Stadium Australia, Sydney	51–9	2003 Rugby World Cup	Fabien Galthié	5th
46	31 October	United States	WIN Stadium, Wollongong, Australia	41–14	2003 Rugby World Cup	Yannick Bru	4th
47	9 November	Ireland	Docklands Stadium, Melbourne	43–21	2003 Rugby World Cup	Fabien Galthié	3rd
48	16 November	England	Stadium Australia, Sydney	7–24	2003 Rugby World Cup	Fabien Galthié	4th
49	20 November	New Zealand	Stadium Australia, Sydney	13–40	2003 Rugby World Cup	Yannick Bru	4th
2004
50	14 February	Ireland	Stade de France, Saint-Denis	35–17	2004 Six Nations	Fabien Pelous	4th
51	21 February	Italy	Stade de France, Saint-Denis	25–0	2004 Six Nations	Fabien Pelous	4th
52	7 March	Wales	Millennium Stadium, Cardiff	29–22	2004 Six Nations	Fabien Pelous	4th
53	21 March	Scotland	Murrayfield Stadium, Edinburgh	31–0	2004 Six Nations	Fabien Pelous	4th
54	27 March	England	Stade de France, Saint-Denis	24–21	2004 Six Nations	Fabien Pelous	4th
55	3 July	United States	Dillon Stadium, Hartford	39–31	2004 tour	Fabien Pelous	4th
56	10 July	Canada	York Stadium, Toronto	47–13	2004 tour	Fabien Pelous	4th
57	13 November	Australia	Stade de France, Saint-Denis	27–14	Autumn internationals	Fabien Pelous	4th
58	20 November	Argentina	Stade Vélodrome, Marseille	14–24	Autumn internationals	Fabien Pelous	4th
59	27 November	New Zealand	Stade de France, Saint-Denis	6–45	Autumn internationals	Fabien Pelous	5th
2005
60	5 February	Scotland	Stade de France, Saint-Denis	16–9	2005 Six Nations	Fabien Pelous	5th
61	13 February	England	Twickenham, London	18–17	2005 Six Nations	Fabien Pelous	4th
62	26 February	Wales	Stade de France, Saint-Denis	18–24	2005 Six Nations	Fabien Pelous	5th
63	12 March	Ireland	Lansdowne Road, Dublin	26–19	2005 Six Nations	Fabien Pelous	4th
64	19 March	Italy	Stadio Flaminio, Rome	56–13	2005 Six Nations	Fabien Pelous	4th
65	18 June	South Africa	Kings Park Stadium, Durban	30–30	2005 tour	Jean-Baptiste Élissalde	4th
66	25 June	South Africa	Nelson Mandela Bay Stadium, Port Elizabeth	13–27	2005 tour	Dimitri Yachvili	4th
67	2 July	Australia	Lang Park, Brisbane	31–37	2005 tour	Jean-Baptiste Élissalde	4th
68	5 November	Australia	Stade Vélodrome, Marseille	26–16	Autumn internationals	Fabien Pelous	3rd
69	12 November	Canada	Stade de la Beaujoire, Nantes	50–6	Autumn internationals	Jérôme Thion	3rd
70	19 November	Tonga	Stadium de Toulouse, Toulouse	43–8	Autumn internationals	Jérôme Thion	4th
71	26 November	South Africa	Stade de France, Saint-Denis	26–20	Autumn internationals	Jérôme Thion	3rd
2006
72	5 February	Scotland	Murrayfield Stadium, Edinburgh	16–20	2006 Six Nations	Fabien Pelous	4th
73	11 February	Ireland	Stade de France, Saint-Denis	43–31	2006 Six Nations	Fabien Pelous	3rd
74	25 February	Italy	Stade de France, Saint-Denis	37–12	2006 Six Nations	Fabien Pelous	4th
75	12 March	England	Stade de France, Saint-Denis	31–6	2006 Six Nations	Fabien Pelous	3rd
76	18 March	Wales	Millennium Stadium, Cardiff	21–16	2006 Six Nations	Fabien Pelous	3rd
77	17 June	Romania	Stadionul Dinamo, Bucharest	62–14	2006 tour	Fabien Pelous	3rd
78	24 June	South Africa	Newlands Stadium, Cape Town	36–26	2006 tour	Fabien Pelous	2nd
79	11 November	New Zealand	Stade de Gerland, Lyon	3–47	Autumn internationals	Fabien Pelous	2nd
80	18 November	New Zealand	Stade de France, Saint-Denis	11–23	Autumn internationals	Raphaël Ibañez	2nd
81	25 November	Argentina	Stade de France, Saint-Denis	27–26	Autumn internationals	Raphaël Ibañez	2nd
2007
82	3 February	Italy	Stadio Flaminio, Rome	39–3	2007 Six Nations	Raphaël Ibañez	2nd
83	11 February	Ireland	Croke Park, Dublin	20–17	2007 Six Nations	Raphaël Ibañez	2nd
84	24 February	Wales	Stade de France, Saint-Denis	32–21	2007 Six Nations	Raphaël Ibañez	2nd
85	11 March	England	Twickenham, London	18–26	2007 Six Nations	Raphaël Ibañez	2nd
86	17 March	Scotland	Stade de France, Saint-Denis	46–19	2007 Six Nations	Raphaël Ibañez	2nd
87	2 June	New Zealand	Eden Park, Auckland	11–42	2007 tour	Pascal Papé	2nd
88	9 June	New Zealand	Westpac Stadium, Wellington	10–61	2007 tour	Pascal Papé	2nd
89	11 August	England	Twickenham, London	21–15	2007 RWC warm-up	Raphaël Ibañez	3rd
90	18 August	England	Stade Vélodrome, Marseille	22–9	2007 RWC warm-up	Raphaël Ibañez	3rd
91	26 August	Wales	Millennium Stadium, Cardiff	34–7	2007 RWC warm-up	Serge Betsen	3rd
92	7 September	Argentina	Stade de France, Saint-Denis	12–17	2007 Rugby World Cup	Raphaël Ibañez	5th
93	16 September	Namibia	Stadium de Toulouse, Toulouse	87–10	2007 Rugby World Cup	Jean-Baptiste Élissalde	5th
94	21 September	Ireland	Stade de France, Saint-Denis	25–3	2007 Rugby World Cup	Raphaël Ibañez	4th
95	30 September	Georgia	Stade Vélodrome, Marseille	64–7	2007 Rugby World Cup	Serge Betsen	5th
96	6 October	New Zealand	Millennium Stadium, Cardiff, Wales	20–18	2007 Rugby World Cup	Raphaël Ibañez	2nd
97	13 October	England	Stade de France, Saint-Denis	9–14	2007 Rugby World Cup	Raphaël Ibañez	4th
98	19 October	Argentina	Parc des Princes, Paris	10–34	2007 Rugby World Cup	Raphaël Ibañez	6th

=== Record by country ===
Opponent	Played	Won	Drew	Lost	Win ratio (%)	For	Against
Argentina	7	1	0	6	14	128	172
Australia	7	3	0	4	43	153	158
Canada	3	3	0	0	100	132	22
England	14	7	0	7	50	246	296
Fiji	2	2	0	0	100	138	28
Georgia	1	1	0	0	100	64	7
Ireland	10	7	0	3	70	288	177
Italy	8	8	0	0	100	315	117
Japan	1	1	0	0	100	51	29
Namibia	1	1	0	0	100	87	10
New Zealand	12	2	1	9	17	197	436
Romania	3	3	0	0	100	185	42
Scotland	9	8	0	1	89	264	92
South Africa	8	5	1	2	63	202	166
Tonga	1	1	0	0	100	43	8
United States	2	2	0	0	100	80	45
Wales	9	7	0	2	78	275	174
TOTAL	98	62	2	34	63	2848	1979

=== Honors ===
- French Rugby Union Championship/Top 14
  - Winner: 1997–98
- Rugby World Cup
  - Fourth place : 2003, 2007
- Six Nations Championship
  - Winner : 2002, 2004, 2006, 2007
  - Grand Slam : 2002, 2004
  - Runner-up : 2000, 2005
  - Third place : 2003
- Giuseppe Garibaldi Trophy
  - Winner : 2007
- Trophée des Bicentenaires
  - Winner : November 2001, November 2004, November 2005
- IRB International Coach of the Year
  - Winner: 2002

== Secretary of Sport ==
It was announced on 19 June 2007, that after the Rugby World Cup in October, Laporte would be named Secretary of State for Youth and Sports in the government of François Fillon. He was appointed on 22 October 2007 as Secretary of State for Sports only.

He was involved in the disputes between the Amaury Sport Organisation, organizers of the Tour de France, the French Cycling Federation and the Union Cycliste Internationale.

Laporte left this cabinet office on 23 June 2009, and was succeeded by Rama Yade.

== Further club coaching ==
Laporte returned to rugby coaching at Bayonne in 2010, but lasted only two months. Laporte was then involved with Stade Français until being signed by Toulon.

Toulon achieved enormous success under his coaching, including winning the Heineken Cup/European Rugby Champions Cup in 2012–13, 2013–14 and 2014–15.

== Rugby administration ==
Laporte was elected president of the French Rugby Federation in late 2016. In May 2017, he joined the World Rugby executive committee, taking the seat left vacant by his predecessor Pierre Camou. He was elected during the general assembly of World Rugby in Kyoto, at the expense of the president of the South African Federation, Mark Alexander.

In July 2019, Laporte was elected vice-president of the Six Nations tournament committee. In 2020 he ran unopposed for vice-chairman of World Rugby, replacing Agustín Pichot and taking office from 12 May 2020 alongside the re-elected chairman Bill Beaumont.

In December 2022 a French court found Laporte guilty of corruption, fining him €75,000 and sentencing him to two years' imprisonment (suspended). He has stated that he will "self-suspend" from rugby administration, but that he will appeal.

== Trivia ==
- He participates in a programme of RMC-Info each Monday, Direct Laporte.
- His puppet is a recurrent character in the satirical TV show Les Guignols de l'Info, who incenses violence in rugby, described as the "valeurs de l'ovalie" (values of rugby) in a hyperbolic manner.
- Laporte has named Bakkies Botha as the greatest player he coached.

Awards
Preceded by (Australia) Rod Macqueen	IRB International Coach of the Year; 2002	Succeeded by (England) Clive Woodward
Sporting positions
Preceded by (France) Jean-Claude Skrela	French National Rugby Union Coach; 1999–2007	Succeeded by (France) Marc Lièvremont
