= French Rugby Federation =

Governing body for rugby union in France

Fédération Française de Rugby
- Sport: Rugby union
- Founded: 13 May 1919; 107 years ago
- World Rugby affiliation: 1978
- Europe affiliation: 1938
- Headquarters: Marcoussis, Essonne
- President: Florian Grill
- Men's coach: Fabien Galthié
- Women's coach: Gaëlle Mignot; David Ortiz
- Sevens coach: Benoît Baby (men); Romain Huet (women)
- Website: www.ffr.fr

The French Rugby Federation (French: Fédération Française de Rugby, pronounced [fedeʁɑsjɔ̃ fʁɑ̃sɛːz də ʁyɡbi]; FFR) is the governing body for rugby union in France. It is responsible for the French national team and the Ligue nationale de rugby that administers the country's professional leagues.

== History ==
Before the FFR was established, football, rugby union and other sports in France were regulated by the Union des Sociétés Françaises de Sports Athlétiques (USFSA). Founded in November 1890, the USFSA was initially headquartered in Paris, but its membership soon expanded to include sports clubs from throughout France.

The FFR was formed in 1919 and is affiliated to World Rugby, the sport's governing body.

In 1934 the FFR set up the Fédération internationale de rugby amateur, now known as Rugby Europe, in an attempt to organise rugby union outside the authority of World Rugby, then known as the International Rugby Football Board (IRFB). It included the national teams of Italy, France, Catalonia, Czechoslovakia, Romania and Germany.

Following German occupation, FFR officials closely associated with the Vichy government lobbied to have certain "un-French" sports banned. Between the end of 1940 and the middle of 1942, one semi-professional and at least six French Amateur Sport Federations were banned and destroyed by the Vichy regime. These actions were independently verified by the French government in 2002.

In 1978 the federation became a member of the IRFB, which later became the International Rugby Board and is now World Rugby.

In November 2026, the FFR expressed interest in hosting the 2028 Nations Championship finals, after the previous hosts, Qatar, withdrew from the hosting rights owing to conflicts in the Middle East.

== Presidents ==
- Bernard Lapasset (1991–2008)
- Pierre Camou (2008–2016)
- Bernard Laporte (2016–2023)
- Alexandre Martinez (interim) (2023)
- Florian Grill (2023–present)

== See also ==
- France national rugby union team
- Ligue Nationale de Rugby
- List of rugby union clubs in France
