= 2014 June rugby union tests =

List of international matches

The 2014 mid-year rugby union internationals (also known as the summer internationals in the Northern Hemisphere) were international rugby union matches mostly played in the Southern Hemisphere during the June international window.

These matches were part of the International Rugby Board (IRB) global rugby calendar (2012–2019) that includes test matches between touring Northern Hemisphere nations and home Southern Hemisphere nations, whilst some of the touring teams played mid-week matches against provincial or regional sides. In addition to this, the calendar gave Tier 2 nations the opportunity to host Tier 1 nations outside the November international window, leading to the 2015 Rugby World Cup.

All Six Nations teams were in action, with England playing a three-test series against New Zealand, whilst playing a mid-week match against the Crusaders. France played Australia in a three-test series, whilst Italy played Fiji, Samoa and Japan. Wales played South Africa in a two-test series, with an additional mid-week match against the Eastern Province Kings, and Ireland played Argentina in a two-test series. Scotland, the only nation that played four tests, visited the Americas, playing the United States, Canada and Argentina, before playing South Africa outside the IRB international window. Unlike previous June windows, 2014 saw Tier 3 fixtures with Uruguay hosting Canadian side BC Bears, to celebrate the 125th Anniversary of the British Columbia Rugby Union. It also acted as a preparation match for Uruguay, ahead of their 2015 Rugby World Cup repechage play-offs in August against Hong Kong.

Tonga played a test match against a Pacific Barbarians side in Auckland to fill a shortfall in their international calendar leading to the World Cup.

== Overview ==
=== Series ===
Event	Result	Victor
Argentina v Ireland test series	0–2	Ireland
Australia v France test series	3–0	Australia
New Zealand v England test series	3–0	New Zealand
South Africa v Wales test series	2–0	South Africa

=== Other tours ===
Team/Tour	Opponents
Italy tour	Fiji (lost) – Japan – (lost) Samoa (lost)
Scotland tour	Argentina (won) – Canada (won) – South Africa (lost) – United States (won)

== Fixtures ==
=== 30 May–1 June ===
30 May 2014
19:05 JST (UTC+09)

Japan	33–14	Samoa
Try: Fujita (2) 11' c, 25' c Matsushima 70' c Con: Goromaru (3/3) 12', 26', 71; Pen: Goromaru (4/4) 15', 40', 41', 67'	Report	Try: Otto 6' c Va'aulu 42' c Con: Fa'apale (2/2) 7', 42'

Chichibunomiya Rugby Stadium, Tokyo
Attendance: 8,460
Referee: John Lacey (Ireland)

Team details

FB	15	Ayumu Goromaru
RW	14	Yoshikazu Fujita
OC	13	Kotaro Matsushima
IC	12	Yuu Tamura		(substituted off) 77'
LW	11	Akihito Yamada
FH	10	Harumichi Tatekawa
SH	9	Atsushi Hiwasa
N8	8	Koliniasi Holani
OF	7	Michael Leitch (c)		(substituted off) 72'
BF	6	Hendrik Tui
RL	5	Shinya Makabe		(substituted off) 49'
LL	4	Hitoshi Ono		(substituted off) 67'
TP	3	Kensuke Hatakeyama		(substituted off) 77'
HK	2	Takeshi Kizu		(substituted off) 74'
LP	1	Masataka Mikami		(substituted off) 67'
Replacements:
PR	16	Hisateru Hirashima		(substituted on) 67'
HK	17	Hiroki Yuhara		(substituted on) 74'
PR	18	Hiroshi Yamashita		(substituted on) 77'
LK	19	Shoji Ito		(substituted on) 67'
FL	20	Luke Thompson	(yellow card) 52' to 62'	(substituted on) 49'
LK	21	Justin Ives		(substituted on) 72'
FH	22	Keisuke Uchida
CE	23	Ryoto Nakamura		(substituted on) 77'
Coach:
(Australia) Eddie Jones

FB	15	Tulolo Tulolo
RW	14	Tua Otto
OC	13	Brando Va'aulu		(substituted off) 77'
IC	12	Anitelea Tuilagi (c)		(substituted off) 67'
LW	11	Reupena Levasa
FH	10	Patrick Fa'apale		(substituted off) 73'
SH	9	Vavao Afemai
N8	8	Misioka Timoteo		(substituted off) 29'
OF	7	Oneone Fa'afou		(substituted off) 67'
BF	6	Faalemiga Selesele
RL	5	Maselino Paulino	(yellow card) 17' to 27'
LL	4	Fa'atiga Lemalu
TP	3	Jake Grey		(substituted off) 72'
HK	2	Andrew Williams		(substituted off) 77'
LP	1	Aniseko Sio
Replacements:
HK	16	Ropeti Lafo		(substituted on) 77'
PR	17	Manu Leiataua		(substituted on) 29'
PR	18	Sam Aiono		(substituted on) 72'
LK	19	Levi Asifa'amatala
FL	20	Lio Lolo		(substituted on) 67'
SH	21	Vaiofoga Simanu		(substituted on) 73'
CE	22	Meki Magele		(substituted on) 67'
CE	23	Kaino Thomsen		(substituted on) 77'
Coach:
(Samoa) Stephen Betham

Touch judges:
Dudley Phillips (Ireland)
Michael Black (Ireland)
Television match official:
Simon McDowell (Ireland)

Notes:

- Twelve players made their international debuts for Samoa, eight in the starting XV; Vavao Afemai, Oneone Fa'afou, Patrick Fa'apale, Jake Grey, Reupena Levasa, Faalemiga Selesele, Aniseko Sio and Tulolo Tulolo, and four off the bench; Sam Aiono, Lio Lolo, Vaiofoga Simanu and Kaino Thomsen.
- Japan's Hitoshi Ono surpassed Hirotoki Onozawa's 81 caps to become Japan's most capped player with 82 caps.
- This was Japan's seventh consecutive win, the longest winning streak they have ever had.

31 May 2014
16:00 ART (UTC-03)

Argentina	40–0	South American XV
Try: Cordero 19' c Tuculet 38' c González Iglesias 58' m Postiglioni (2) 66' c, 71' c Montero 75' c Con: Sánchez (2/2) 20', 39'; González Iglesias (3/4) 67', 71', 76'	Report (In Spanish)

Santo Tomé, Santa Fe
Referee: Francisco Pastrana (Argentina)

Team details

FB	15	Joaquín Tuculet	(substituted off) 40'
RW	14	Matías Orlando	(substituted off) 40'
OC	13	Jerónimo de la Fuente
IC	12	Gabriel Ascárate	(substituted off) 40'
LW	11	Santiago Cordero	(substituted off) 40'
FH	10	Nicolás Sánchez	(substituted off) 49'
SH	9	Martín Landajo (c)	(substituted off) 61'
N8	8	Benjamín Macome	(substituted off) 47'
OF	7	Facundo Isa	(substituted off) 40'	(substituted on) 61'
BF	6	Rodrigo Báez		(substituted off) 61'
RL	5	Tomás Lavanini
LL	4	Matías Alemano	(substituted off) 58'
TP	3	Tetaz Chaparro	(substituted off) 49'
HK	2	Matías Cortese	(substituted off) 50'	(substituted on) 73'
LP	1	Lucas Noguera Paz	(substituted off) 73'
Replacements:
HK	16	Julián Montoya	(substituted on) 50'	(substituted off) 73'
HK	17	Santiago Iglesias	(substituted on) 73'
PR	18	Bruno Postiglioni	(substituted on) 49'
LK	19	Lucas Ponce	(substituted on) 58'
FL	20	Javier Ortega Desio	(substituted on) 40'
N8	21	Antonio Ahualli de Chazal	(substituted on) 47'
SH	22	Felipe Ezcurra	(substituted on) 61'
FH	23	Santiago González Iglesias	(substituted on) 49'
CE	24	Javier Rojas	(substituted on) 40'
WG	25	Manuel Montero	(substituted on) 40'
WG	26	Ramiro Moyano	(substituted on) 40'
FB	27	Lucas González Amorosino	(substituted on) 40'
Coach:
(Argentina) Daniel Hourcade
Touch judges:
Juan Sylvestre (Argentina); Emilio Traverso (Argentina)

FB	15	(Argentina) Gonzalo Gutiérrez Taboada
RW	14	(Argentina) Facundo Barrea	(substituted off) 40'
OC	13	(Argentina) Matías Masera	(substituted off) 65'
IC	12	(Argentina) Juan Ignacio Brex
LW	11	(Argentina) Tomás Carrió	(substituted off) 65'
FH	10	(Argentina) Sebastián Poet	(substituted off) 46'
SH	9	(Argentina) Marcos Bollini	(substituted off) 60'
N8	8	(Argentina) Lisandro Ahualli de Chazal (c)		(substituted off) 65'
OF	7	(Argentina) Lautaro Casado	(substituted off) 38'
BF	6	(Argentina) Lucas Maguire
RL	5	(Argentina) Franco Baldoni	(substituted off) 35'
LL	4	(Argentina) Martin Chiappesoni	(substituted off) 46'
TP	3	(Argentina) Santiago García Botta
HK	2	(Argentina) Tomás Baravalle	(substituted off) 33'
LP	1	(Argentina) Ignacio Sáenz Lancuba	(substituted off) 55'
Replacements:
HK	16	(Argentina) Facundo Bosch	(substituted on) 33'
PR	17	(Argentina) Facundo Maina	(substituted on) 55'
LK	18	(Argentina) Juan Martín Guerineau	(substituted on) 46'
LK	19	(Argentina) Santiago Rocchia Ferro	(substituted on) 35'	(substituted off) 61'
FL	20	(Colombia) Gil Mejia		(substituted on) 61'
FL	21	(Argentina) Nicolás Proto	(substituted on) 38'	(substituted off) 55'
FL	22	(Chile) Ignacio Silva		(substituted on) 55'
N8	23	(Brazil) João Luiz Daros		(substituted on) 65'
SH	24	(Argentina) Gonzalo Bertranou	(substituted on) 60'
FH	25	(Argentina) Bautista Güemes	(substituted on) 46'
CE	26	(Paraguay) Diego Argaña	(substituted on) 65'
WG	27	(Venezuela) Carlos Eloy Barbosa	(substituted on) 65'
WG	28	(Argentina) Dan Isaack	(substituted on) 40'
Coach:
(Argentina) Bernardo Urdaneta (Argentina) Pablo Gómez Cora (Argentina) Elías Santillán

1 June 2014
15:00 BST (UTC+01)

England	29–39	Barbarians
Try: Ewers 11' c Sharples 23' m Slade 55' m Con: Slade (1/2) 13'; Pen: Daly (1/1) 21'; Slade (3/3) 36', 61', 67'	Report	Try: Stanley 17' c Hernández 26' c Gorgodze 45' c Gear (2) 63' c, 76' m Con: James (3/3) 18', 28', 46'; Trinh-Duc (1/2) 64'; Pen: James (1/1) 51'; Trinh-Duc (1/1) 58'

Twickenham Stadium, London
Attendance: 50,498
Referee: Mathieu Raynal (France)

Team details

FB	15	Elliot Daly
RW	14	Semesa Rokoduguni
OC	13	Jonathan Joseph			(substituted off) 53'
IC	12	Sam Hill
LW	11	Charlie Sharples	(substituted off) 53'
FH	10	Henry Slade	18' to 28'
SH	9	Joe Simpson	(substituted off) 51'
N8	8	Dave Ewers			(substituted off) 72'
OF	7	Luke Wallace
BF	6	Jamie Gibson	(substituted off) 30'
RL	5	Graham Kitchener (c)
LL	4	Michael Paterson	(substituted off) 57'	(substituted on) 66'
TP	3	Kyle Sinckler	(substituted off) 51'
HK	2	Rob Buchanan	(substituted off) 46'	(substituted on) 64'
LP	1	Ross Harrison	(substituted off) 51'
Replacements:
HK	16	Tommy Taylor	(substituted on) 46'	(substituted off) 64'
PR	17	Fraser Balmain	(substituted on) 51'
PR	18	Will Collier	(substituted on) 51'
LK	19	Charlie Matthews	(substituted on) 57'	(substituted off) 66'	(substituted on) 72'
FL	20	James Gaskell	(substituted on) 30'
SH	21	Dan Robson	(substituted on) 51'
FH	22	Ollie Devoto	(substituted on) 18'	(substituted off) 28'	(substituted on) 53'
FB	23	Rob Miller	(substituted on) 53'
Coach:
(England) Jon Callard

FB	15	(Argentina) Juan Martín Hernández
RW	14	(New Zealand) Joe Rokocoko	(substituted off) 47'
OC	13	(New Zealand) Rene Ranger
IC	12	(New Zealand) Benson Stanley
LW	11	(New Zealand) Hosea Gear
FH	10	(Australia) Brock James	(substituted off) 52'
SH	9	(New Zealand) Jimmy Cowan	(substituted off) 47'	(substituted on) 66'
N8	8	(Georgia (country)) Mamuka Gorgodze
OF	7	(France) Alexandre Lapandry	(substituted off) 55'
BF	6	(Argentina) Juan Manuel Leguizamón (c)
RL	5	(South Africa) Juandré Kruger
LL	4	(Ireland) Donncha O'Callaghan	(substituted off) 52'
TP	3	(Georgia (country)) Davit Zirakashvili	(substituted off) 74'
HK	2	(Samoa) Ti’i Paulo	(substituted off) 64'
LP	1	(Tonga) Sona Taumalolo	(substituted off) 47'
Replacements:
HK	16	(New Zealand) Andrew Hore	(substituted on) 64'
PR	17	(France) Julien Brugnaut	(substituted on) 47'
PR	18	(Argentina) Nahuel Lobo	(substituted on) 74'
LK	19	(Samoa) Joe Tekori	(substituted on) 52'
N8	20	(Ireland) Roger Wilson	(substituted on) 55'
SH	21	(Argentina) Tomás Cubelli	(substituted on) 47'	(substituted off) 66'
FH	22	(France) François Trinh-Duc	(substituted on) 52'
CE	23	(New Zealand) Anthony Tuitavake	(substituted on) 47'
Coach:
(England) Dean Ryan

Man of the Match:
(New Zealand) Hosea Gear (Barbarians)

Touch judges:
Neil Hennessey (Wales)
Ben Whitehouse (Wales)
Television match official:
Gareth Simmonds (Wales)

Notes:

- Jon Callard coached England, with Lancaster in New Zealand with the touring 30-man squad.
- This was the Barbarians' first back-to-back win since beating England and Wales in 2011, which was also the last time the Barbarians beat England.

=== 7 June ===
7 June 2014
15:10 FJT (UTC+12)

Fiji	25–14	Italy
Try: Nadolo 19' m Waqaniburotu 60' c Nalaga 78' c Con: Ralulu (1/2) 61'; Nadolo (1/1) 79'; Pen: Nadolo (2/2) 66', 71'	Report (In Italian)	Try: Penalty try (2) 10' c, 76' c Con: Orquera (2/2) 10', 77'

ANZ National Stadium, Suva
Attendance: 12,000
Referee: JP Doyle (England)

Team details

FB	15	Metuisela Talebula			(substituted off) 77'
RW	14	Napolioni Nalaga
OC	13	Asaeli Tikoirotuma
IC	12	Nemani Nadolo	44' to 50'
LW	11	Timoci Nagusa	(substituted off) 70'
FH	10	Jonetani Ralulu
SH	9	Nemia Kenatale	(substituted off) 40'
N8	8	Nemani Nagusa	(substituted off) 76'
OF	7	Akapusi Qera (c)
BF	6	Dominiko Waqaniburotu
RL	5	Apisai Naikatini	(substituted off) 63'
LL	4	Apisalome Ratuniyarawa
TP	3	Manasa Saulo	(substituted off) 40'
HK	2	Talemaitoga Tuapati	(substituted off) 40'
LP	1	Campese Ma'afu	(substituted off) 47'
Replacements:
HK	16	Sunia Koto	(substituted on) 40'
PR	17	Jerry Yanuyanutawa	(substituted on) 47'
PR	18	Isei Colati	(substituted on) 40'
LK	19	Wame Lewaravu	(substituted on) 63'
FL	20	Malakai Ravulo	(substituted on) 76'
SH	21	Nikola Matawalu	(substituted on) 40'
WG	22	Watisoni Votu	(substituted on) 44'	(substituted off) 50'	(substituted on) 77'
CE	23	Adriu Delai	(substituted on) 70'
Coach:
(New Zealand) John McKee

FB	15	Luke McLean
RW	14	Leonardo Sarto	(substituted off) 67'
OC	13	Michele Campagnaro
IC	12	Alberto Sgarbi
LW	11	Giovanbattista Venditti
FH	10	Luciano Orquera
SH	9	Guglielmo Palazzani
N8	8	Manoa Vosawai	(substituted off) 66'
OF	7	Mauro Bergamasco
BF	6	Joshua Furno
RL	5	Marco Bortolami	(substituted off) 61'
LL	4	Quintin Geldenhuys (c)
TP	3	Lorenzo Cittadini	(substituted off) 53'
HK	2	Leonardo Ghiraldini	(substituted off) 53'
LP	1	Matías Agüero	(substituted off) 53'
Replacements:
HK	16	Davide Giazzon	(substituted on) 53'
PR	17	Andrea De Marchi	(substituted on) 53'
PR	18	Alberto De Marchi	(substituted on) 53'
LK	19	George Biagi	(substituted on) 61'
FL	20	Paul Derbyshire	(substituted on) 66'
SH	21	Tito Tebaldi
FH	22	Tommaso Allan
FB	23	Andrea Masi	(substituted on) 67'
Coach:
(France) Jacques Brunel

Touch judges:
Johan Hoffmann (Australia)
James Leckie (Australia)

Notes:

- Isei Colati made his international debut for Fiji.
- Andrea De Marchi and Guglielmo Palazzani made their international debuts for Italy.

7 June 2014
19:35 NZST (UTC+12)

New Zealand	20–15	England
Try: C. Smith 77' m Pen: Cruden (5/5) 9', 24', 38', 66', 70'	Report	Pen: Burns (4/4) 2', 18', 21', 63'; Cipriani (1/1) 73'

Eden Park, Auckland
Attendance: 47,195
Referee: Nigel Owens (Wales)

Team details

FB	15	Israel Dagg	(substituted off) 54'
RW	14	Ben Smith
OC	13	Conrad Smith
IC	12	Ma'a Nonu	(substituted off) 59'
LW	11	Cory Jane
FH	10	Aaron Cruden
SH	9	Aaron Smith	(substituted off) 70'
N8	8	Jerome Kaino
OF	7	Richie McCaw (c)
BF	6	Liam Messam	(substituted off) 71'
RL	5	Sam Whitelock
LL	4	Brodie Retallick
TP	3	Owen Franks	(substituted off) 54'
HK	2	Dane Coles	(substituted off) 59'
LP	1	Tony Woodcock	(substituted off) 59'
Replacements:
HK	16	Keven Mealamu	(substituted on) 59'
PR	17	Wyatt Crockett	(substituted on) 59'
PR	18	Charlie Faumuina	(substituted on) 54'
LK	19	Patrick Tuipulotu
FL	20	Victor Vito	(substituted on) 71'
SH	21	TJ Perenara	(substituted on) 70'
FH	22	Beauden Barrett	(substituted on) 54'
CE	23	Malakai Fekitoa	(substituted on) 59'
Coach:
(New Zealand) Steve Hansen

FB	15	Mike Brown
RW	14	Marland Yarde	(yellow card) 69' to 79'
OC	13	Manu Tuilagi
IC	12	Kyle Eastmond
LW	11	Jonny May		(substituted off) 79'
FH	10	Freddie Burns		(substituted off) 71'
SH	9	Ben Youngs		(substituted off) 79'
N8	8	Ben Morgan
OF	7	Chris Robshaw (c)
BF	6	James Haskell		(substituted off) 70'
RL	5	Geoff Parling
LL	4	Joe Launchbury		(substituted off) 70'
TP	3	David Wilson		(substituted off) 70'
HK	2	Rob Webber		(substituted off) 70'
LP	1	Joe Marler
Replacements:
HK	16	Joe Gray		(substituted on) 70'
PR	17	Matt Mullan
PR	18	Henry Thomas		(substituted on) 70'
LK	19	Dave Attwood		(substituted on) 70'
FL	20	Tom Johnson		(substituted on) 70'
SH	21	Lee Dickson		(substituted on) 79'
FH	22	Danny Cipriani		(substituted on) 71'
FB	23	Chris Pennell		(substituted on) 79'
Coach:
(England) Stuart Lancaster

Man of the Match:
Conrad Smith (New Zealand)

Touch judges:
Jaco Peyper (South Africa)
Jérôme Garcès (France)
Television match official:
George Ayoub (Australia)

Notes:

- Malakai Fekitoa and TJ Perenara made their international debuts for New Zealand.
- Chris Pennell and Joe Gray made their international debuts for England.
- With this win, New Zealand win 31 consecutive home matches, a world record by a test team.

7 June 2014
20:00 AEST (UTC+10)

Australia	50–23	France
Try: Folau 18' c Ashley-Cooper 23' m Hooper 32' c To'omua 38' c Cummins 55' c Beale 67' c McCabe 70' c Con: Foley (6/7) 20', 32', 39', 57', 68', 71'; Pen: Foley (1/2) 3'	Report	Try: Parra 72' c Penalty try 80' c Con: Michalak (2/2) 73', 80'; Pen: Michalak (2/2) 26', 36'; Drop: Michalak (1/1) 4'

Lang Park, Brisbane
Attendance: 33,718
Referee: Craig Joubert (South Africa)

Team details

FB	15	Israel Folau
RW	14	Adam Ashley-Cooper
OC	13	Tevita Kuridrani	(substituted off) 70'
IC	12	Matt To'omua	(substituted off) 62'
LW	11	Nick Cummins
FH	10	Bernard Foley
SH	9	Nic White	(substituted off) 62'
N8	8	Wycliff Palu	(substituted off) 54'
OF	7	Michael Hooper
BF	6	Scott Fardy
RL	5	Rob Simmons	(substituted off) 70'
LL	4	Sam Carter
TP	3	Sekope Kepu	(substituted off) 53'
HK	2	Stephen Moore (c)	(substituted off) 5'
LP	1	James Slipper	(substituted off) 62'
Replacements:
HK	16	Tatafu Polota-Nau	(substituted on) 5'
PR	17	Pekahou Cowan	(substituted on) 62'
PR	18	Paddy Ryan	(substituted on) 53'
LK	19	James Horwill	(substituted on) 70'
N8	20	Ben McCalman	(substituted on) 54'
SH	21	Nick Phipps	(substituted on) 62'
FH	22	Kurtley Beale	(substituted on) 62'
CE	23	Pat McCabe	(substituted on) 70'
Coach:
(Australia) Ewen McKenzie

FB	15	Hugo Bonneval
RW	14	Yoann Huget
OC	13	Gaël Fickou	(substituted off) 73'
IC	12	Wesley Fofana
LW	11	Felix Le Bourhis	(substituted off) 53'
FH	10	Frédéric Michalak
SH	9	Maxime Machenaud	(substituted off) 69'
N8	8	Damien Chouly
OF	7	Bernard Le Roux	(substituted off) 61'
BF	6	Fulgence Ouedraogo
RL	5	Yoann Maestri
LL	4	Sébastien Vahaamahina	(substituted off) 53'
TP	3	Nicolas Mas (c)	(substituted off) 53'
HK	2	Guilhem Guirado	(substituted off) 69'
LP	1	Thomas Domingo	(substituted off) 53'
Replacements:
HK	16	Christopher Tolofua	(substituted on) 69'
PR	17	Vincent Debaty	(substituted on) 53'
PR	18	Rabah Slimani	(substituted on) 53'
LK	19	Alexandre Flanquart	(substituted on) 53'
FL	20	Antoine Burban	(substituted on) 61'
SH	21	Morgan Parra	(substituted on) 69'
CE	22	Rémi Lamerat	(substituted on) 73'
FB	23	Brice Dulin	(substituted on) 53'
Coach:
(France) Philippe Saint-André

Man of the Match:
Sam Carter (Australia)

Touch judges:
Chris Pollock (New Zealand)
Garratt Williamson (New Zealand)
Television match official:
Ben Skeen (New Zealand)

Notes:

- James Slipper and Wycliff Palu earned their 50th test cap for Australia.
- Sam Carter made his international debut for Australia.
- Felix Le Bourhis and Rémi Lamerat made their international debuts for France.

7 June 2014
17:00 SAST (UTC+02)

South Africa	47–13	World XV
Try: Habana 16' m Botha 32' c B. Du Plessis (2) 48' m, 58' c Goosen 77' c Le Roux 79' c Con: M. Steyn (2/4) 33', 59'; Goosen (2/2) 78', 79'; Pen: M. Steyn (3/3) 16', 30', 44'	Report	Try: Hargreaves 5' c Con: O'Connor (1/1) 5'; Pen: O'Connor (2/2) 23', 40'

Newlands Stadium, Cape Town
Attendance: 31,500
Referee: George Clancy (Ireland)

Team details

FB	15	Willie le Roux
RW	14	Cornal Hendricks
OC	13	JP Pietersen
IC	12	François Steyn
LW	11	Bryan Habana	(substituted off) 68'
FH	10	Morné Steyn	(substituted off) 68'
SH	9	Ruan Pienaar	(substituted off) 50'
N8	8	Duane Vermeulen
OF	7	Willem Alberts	(substituted off) 59'
BF	6	Francois Louw
RL	5	Victor Matfield (c)
LL	4	Bakkies Botha	(substituted off) 50'
TP	3	Jannie du Plessis	(substituted off) 64'
HK	2	Bismarck du Plessis	(substituted off) 59'
LP	1	Tendai Mtawarira	(substituted off) 64'
Replacements:
HK	16	Schalk Brits	(substituted on) 59'
PR	17	Gurthrö Steenkamp	(substituted on) 64'
PR	18	Coenie Oosthuizen	(substituted on) 64'
LK	19	Flip van der Merwe	(substituted on) 50'
FL	20	Schalk Burger	(substituted on) 59'
SH	21	Fourie du Preez	(substituted on) 50'
FH	22	Johan Goosen	(substituted on) 68'
WG	23	Lwazi Mvovo	(substituted on) 68'
Coach:
(South Africa) Heyneke Meyer

FB	15	(Australia) James O'Connor
RW	14	(Australia) Drew Mitchell		(substituted off) 61'
OC	13	(New Zealand) Rene Ranger
IC	12	(South Africa) Wynand Olivier
LW	11	(New Zealand) Hosea Gear
FH	10	(Australia) Matt Giteau (c)		(substituted off) 58'
SH	9	(South Africa) Rory Kockott		(substituted off) 64'
N8	8	(Ireland) Roger Wilson
OF	7	(England) Steffon Armitage		(substituted off) 61'
BF	6	(Georgia (country)) Mamuka Gorgodze	(yellow card) 47' to 57'
RL	5	(South Africa) Alistair Hargreaves
LL	4	(South Africa) Juandré Kruger		(substituted off) 40'
TP	3	(New Zealand) Carl Hayman		(substituted off) 57'
HK	2	(South Africa) Craig Burden		(substituted off) 47'
LP	1	(Tonga) Sona Taumalolo		(substituted off) 54'
Replacements:
HK	16	(New Zealand) Andrew Hore		(substituted on) 47'
PR	17	(South Africa) Schalk Ferreira		(substituted on) 54'
PR	18	(South Africa) Pat Cilliers		(substituted on) 54'
LK	19	(Samoa) Joe Tekori		(substituted on) 40'
FL	20	(France) Alexandre Lapandry		(substituted on) 61'
SH	21	(New Zealand) Jimmy Cowan	(yellow card) 73' to 80'	(substituted on) 64'
FH	22	(France) François Trinh-Duc		(substituted on) 58'
CE	23	(New Zealand) Benson Stanley		(substituted on) 61'
Coach:
(South Africa) Nick Mallett

Man of the Match:
Bakkies Botha (South Africa)

Touch judges:
Lourens van der Merwe (South Africa)
Quinton Immelman (South Africa)
Television match official:
Deon van Blommestein (South Africa)

7 June 2014
15:40 ART (UTC-03)

Argentina	17–29	Ireland
Try: Montero 30' c De la Vega 78' c Con: Sánchez (1/1) 31'; González Iglesias (1/1) 79'; Pen: Sánchez (1/2) 26'	Report	Try: Henry 34' m Sexton 42' m Trimble 57' c Con: Sexton (1/3) 58'; Pen: Sexton (2/2) 9', 18'; Madigan (2/2) 67', 70'

Estadio Centenario, Resistencia
Attendance: 21,000
Referee: Glen Jackson (New Zealand)

Team details

FB	15	Joaquín Tuculet			(substituted off) 73'
RW	14	Santiago Cordero		(substituted off) 64'	(substituted on) 73'
OC	13	Jerónimo de la Fuente
IC	12	Gabriel Ascárate
LW	11	Manuel Montero
FH	10	Nicolás Sánchez		(substituted off) 69'
SH	9	Martín Landajo (c)		(substituted off) 63'
N8	8	Benjamín Macome	(yellow card) 28' to 38'
OF	7	Tomás de la Vega
BF	6	Rodrigo Baez		(substituted off) 63'
RL	5	Tomás Lavanini
LL	4	Manuel Carizza		(substituted off) 40'
TP	3	Ramiro Herrera		(substituted off) 56'
HK	2	Matías Cortese		(substituted off) 58'
LP	1	Lucas Noguera Paz		(substituted off) 75'
Replacements:
HK	16	Julián Montoya		(substituted on) 58'
PR	17	Bruno Postiglioni		(substituted on) 75'
PR	18	Tetaz Chaparro		(substituted on) 56'
LK	19	Matías Alemano		(substituted on) 40'
FL	20	Javier Ortega Desio		(substituted on) 63'
SH	21	Tomás Cubelli		(substituted on) 63'
FH	22	Santiago González Iglesias		(substituted on) 69'
FB	23	Lucas González Amorosino		(substituted on) 64'
Coach:
(Argentina) Daniel Hourcade

FB	15	Felix Jones
RW	14	Andrew Trimble
OC	13	Darren Cave
IC	12	Luke Marshall	(substituted off) 56'
LW	11	Simon Zebo
FH	10	Johnny Sexton	(substituted off) 63'
SH	9	Conor Murray	(substituted off) 58'
N8	8	Jordi Murphy	(substituted off) 58'
OF	7	Chris Henry
BF	6	Robbie Diack
RL	5	Paul O'Connell (c)	(substituted off) 67'
LL	4	Iain Henderson
TP	3	Mike Ross	(substituted off) 67'
HK	2	Rory Best	(substituted off) 67'
LP	1	Jack McGrath	(substituted off) 60'
Replacements:
HK	16	Damien Varley	(substituted on) 67'
PR	17	Dave Kilcoyne	(substituted on) 60'
PR	18	Rodney Ah You	(substituted on) 67'
LK	19	Devin Toner	(substituted on) 67'
N8	20	Jamie Heaslip	(substituted on) 58'
SH	21	Kieran Marmion	(substituted on) 58'
FH	22	Ian Madigan	(substituted on) 63'
WG	23	Fergus McFadden	(substituted on) 56'
Coach:
(New Zealand) Joe Schmidt

Man of the Match:
Johnny Sexton (Ireland)

Touch judges:
Mike Fraser (New Zealand)
Jaco van Heerden (South Africa)
Television match official:
Shaun Veldsman (South Africa)

Notes:

- Ramiro Herrera made his international debut for Argentina.
- Rodney Ah You, Robbie Diack and Kieran Marmion made their international debuts for Ireland.
- Paul O'Connell played his 100th test match; 93 for Ireland and 7 for the British and Irish Lions.
- This was Ireland's first victory over Argentina, when playing on Argentine soil, in a fully test capped match.

7 June 2014
19:30 CDT (UTC-05)

United States	6–24	Scotland
Pen: Wyles (2/3) 11', 51'	Report	Try: Visser 15' c Penalty try 30' c Hogg 66' c Con: Laidlaw (3/3) 16', 31', 67'; Pen: Laidlaw (1/2) 6'

BBVA Compass Stadium, Houston
Attendance: 20,001
Referee: Pascal Gaüzère (France)

Team details

FB	15	Chris Wyles
RW	14	Blaine Scully
OC	13	Seamus Kelly
IC	12	Andrew Suniula		(substituted off) 19'
LW	11	Luke Hume
FH	10	Shalom Suniula
SH	9	Mike Petri		(substituted off) 70'
N8	8	Cam Dolan
OF	7	Scott LaValla
BF	6	Todd Clever (c)		77' to 79'
RL	5	Hayden Smith		(substituted off) 29'	(substituted on) 39'	(substituted off) 53'
LL	4	Louis Stanfill		(substituted off) 63'
TP	3	Eric Fry				(substituted off) 40'
HK	2	Phil Thiel		(substituted off) 18'
LP	1	Olive Kilifi	(yellow card) 29' to 39'	(substituted off) 52'
Replacements:
HK	16	Tom Coolican		(substituted on) 18'
PR	17	Nicholas Wallace		(substituted on) 29'	(substituted off) 39'	(substituted on) 40'
PR	18	Titi Lamositele		(substituted on) 52'
LK	19	Tai Tuisamoa		(substituted on) 63'
FL	20	Danny Barrett				(substituted on) 53'
CE	21	Folau Niua		(substituted on) 19'
CE	22	Chad London		(substituted on) 77'	(substituted off) 79'
WG	23	Tim Maupin		(substituted on) 70'
Coach:
(United States) Mike Tolkin

FB	15	Stuart Hogg	(substituted off) 74'
RW	14	Sean Maitland
OC	13	Sean Lamont
IC	12	Duncan Taylor	(substituted off) 62'
LW	11	Tim Visser
FH	10	Finn Russell
SH	9	Greig Laidlaw (c)
N8	8	Johnnie Beattie
OF	7	Blair Cowan
BF	6	Alasdair Strokosch	(substituted off) 62'
RL	5	Jim Hamilton	(substituted off) 37'
LL	4	Richie Gray
TP	3	Geoff Cross	(substituted off) 44'
HK	2	Scott Lawson	(substituted off) 62'
LP	1	Gordon Reid	(substituted off) 55'
Replacements:
HK	16	Pat MacArthur	(substituted on) 62'
PR	17	Alex Allan	(substituted on) 55'
PR	18	Moray Low	(substituted on) 44'
LK	19	Grant Gilchrist	(substituted on) 37'
FL	20	Kieran Low	(substituted on) 62'
SH	21	Grayson Hart
FH	22	Ruaridh Jackson	(substituted on) 74'
CE	23	Max Evans	(substituted on) 62'
Coach:
(New Zealand) Vern Cotter

Man of the Match:
Stuart Hogg (Scotland)

Touch judges:
Francisco Pastrana (Argentina)
Chris Assmus (Canada)
Television match official:
Andrew Hosie (Canada)

Notes:

- Danny Barrett made his international debut for the United States.
- Alex Allan, Blair Cowan, Gordon Reid and Finn Russell made their international debuts for Scotland.

=== 14 June ===
14 June 2014
14:00 WST (UTC+13)

Samoa	15–0	Italy
Pen: T. Pisi (5/7) 10', 24', 30', 47', 69'	Report (In Italian)

Apia Park, Apia
Attendance: 7,000
Referee: George Clancy (Ireland)

Team details

FB	15	Fa'atoina Autagavaia
RW	14	Tua Otto	(substituted off) 71'
OC	13	George Pisi
IC	12	Alapati Leiua
LW	11	David Lemi (c)
FH	10	Tusi Pisi
SH	9	Kahn Fotuali'i	(substituted off) 71'
N8	8	Kane Thompson	(substituted off) 55'
OF	7	Jack Lam
BF	6	Ofisa Treviranus
RL	5	Daniel Leo
LL	4	Fa'atiga Lemalu	(substituted off) 63'
TP	3	James Johnston	(substituted off) 55'
HK	2	Ti’i Paulo	(substituted off) 55'
LP	1	Logovi'i Mulipola	(substituted off) 71'
Replacements:
HK	16	Ole Avei	(substituted on) 55'
PR	17	Sakaria Taulafo	(substituted on) 71'
PR	18	Census Johnston	(substituted on) 55'
FL	19	Maurie Fa'asavalu	(substituted on) 55'
LK	20	Piula Fa'asalele	(substituted on) 63'
FH	21	Patrick Fa'apale
SH	22	Vavao Afemai	(substituted on) 71'
CE	23	Johnny Leota	(substituted on) 71'
Coach:
(Samoa) Stephen Betham

FB	15	Luke McLean
RW	14	Angelo Esposito
OC	13	Andrea Masi
IC	12	Gonzalo Garcia	(substituted off) 77'
LW	11	Giovanbattista Venditti
FH	10	Tommaso Allan	(substituted off) 68'
SH	9	Tito Tebaldi	(substituted off) 72'
N8	8	Robert Barbieri	(substituted off) 68'
OF	7	Mauro Bergamasco
BF	6	Joshua Furno
RL	5	George Biagi	(substituted off) 71'
LL	4	Quintin Geldenhuys (c)
TP	3	Lorenzo Cittadini	(substituted off) 53'
HK	2	Leonardo Ghiraldini	(substituted off) 61'
LP	1	Alberto De Marchi	(substituted off) 53'
Replacements:
HK	16	Andrea Manici	(substituted on) 61'
PR	17	Matías Agüero	(substituted on) 53'
PR	18	Dario Chistolini	(substituted on) 53'
LK	19	Marco Bortolami	(substituted on) 71'
N8	20	Manoa Vosawai	(substituted on) 68'
SH	21	Guglielmo Palazzani	(substituted on) 72'
FH	22	Luciano Orquera	(substituted on) 68'
WG	23	Tommaso Iannone	(substituted on) 77'
Coach:
(France) Jacques Brunel

Touch judges:
Andrew Lees (Australia)
James Leckie (Australia)

Notes:

- Dario Chistolini made his international debut for Italy.
- Marco Bortolami surpassed Martin Castrogiovanni and Sergio Parisse, to become Italy's most capped player with 106 caps.

14 June 2014
19:35 NZST (UTC+12)

New Zealand	28–27	England
Try: B. Smith 43' c Savea 49' m Nonu 63' c Con: Cruden (1/2) 44'; Barrett (1/1) 65'; Pen: Cruden (2/3) 11', 40'; Barrett (1/2) 59'	Report	Try: Yarde 7' c Brown 71' c Ashton 80' c Con: Farrell (3/3) 8', 71', 80'; Pen: Farrell (2/3) 2', 47'

Forsyth Barr Stadium, Dunedin
Attendance: 28,470
Referee: Jaco Peyper (South Africa)

Team details

FB	15	Ben Smith
RW	14	Cory Jane
OC	13	Conrad Smith
IC	12	Ma'a Nonu
LW	11	Julian Savea
FH	10	Aaron Cruden	(substituted off) 50'
SH	9	Aaron Smith	(substituted off) 76'
N8	8	Jerome Kaino
OF	7	Richie McCaw (c)
BF	6	Liam Messam	(substituted off) 65'
RL	5	Sam Whitelock
LL	4	Brodie Retallick	(substituted off) 76'
TP	3	Owen Franks	(substituted off) 65'
HK	2	Dane Coles	(substituted off) 59'
LP	1	Tony Woodcock	(substituted off) 65'
Replacements:
HK	16	Keven Mealamu	(substituted on) 59'
PR	17	Wyatt Crockett	(substituted on) 65'
PR	18	Charlie Faumuina	(substituted on) 65'
LK	19	Patrick Tuipulotu	(substituted on) 76'
FL	20	Victor Vito	(substituted on) 65'
SH	21	TJ Perenara	(substituted on) 76'
FH	22	Beauden Barrett	(substituted on) 50'
CE	23	Malakai Fekitoa
Coach:
(New Zealand) Steve Hansen

FB	15	Mike Brown
RW	14	Manu Tuilagi
OC	13	Luther Burrell		(substituted off) 74'
IC	12	Billy Twelvetrees
LW	11	Marland Yarde
FH	10	Owen Farrell	(yellow card) 58' to 68'
SH	9	Danny Care		(substituted off) 71'
N8	8	Ben Morgan
OF	7	Chris Robshaw (c)
BF	6	Tom Wood		(substituted off) 56'
RL	5	Geoff Parling
LL	4	Joe Launchbury		(substituted off) 56'
TP	3	David Wilson		(substituted off) 76'
HK	2	Rob Webber		(substituted off) 47'
LP	1	Joe Marler		(substituted off) 71'
Replacements:
HK	16	Dylan Hartley		(substituted on) 47'
PR	17	Matt Mullan		(substituted on) 71'
PR	18	Kieran Brookes		(substituted on) 76'
LK	19	Courtney Lawes		(substituted on) 56'
N8	20	Billy Vunipola		(substituted on) 56'
SH	21	Ben Youngs		(substituted on) 71'
FH	22	Freddie Burns
WG	23	Chris Ashton		(substituted on) 74'
Coach:
(England) Stuart Lancaster

Man of the Match:
Ben Smith (New Zealand)

Touch judges:
Nigel Owens (Wales)
Jérôme Garcès (France)
Television match official:
George Ayoub (Australia)

Notes:

- Jerome Kaino earned his 50th test cap for New Zealand.
- Patrick Tuipulotu made his international debut for New Zealand.
- Kieran Brookes made his international debut for England.
- New Zealand retain the Hillary Shield, the fifth time they have held the trophy.

14 June 2014
20:00 AEST (UTC+10)

Australia	6–0	France
Pen: White (1/4) 64'; Foley (1/1) 52'	Report

Docklands Stadium, Melbourne
Attendance: 27,189
Referee: Wayne Barnes (England)

Team details

FB	15	Israel Folau
RW	14	Adam Ashley-Cooper
OC	13	Tevita Kuridrani	(substituted off) 59'
IC	12	Matt To'omua
LW	11	Nick Cummins
FH	10	Bernard Foley	(substituted off) 60'
SH	9	Nic White	(substituted off) 78'
N8	8	Ben McCalman
OF	7	Michael Hooper (c)
BF	6	Scott Fardy	(substituted off) 66'
RL	5	James Horwill	(substituted off) 59'
LL	4	Rob Simmons
TP	3	Sekope Kepu	(substituted off) 74'
HK	2	Tatafu Polota-Nau	(substituted off) 74'
LP	1	James Slipper	(substituted off) 71'
Replacements:
HK	16	Nathan Charles	(substituted on) 74'
PR	17	Pekahou Cowan	(substituted on) 71'
PR	18	Laurie Weeks	(substituted on) 74'
LK	19	Luke Jones	(substituted on) 59'
N8	20	Scott Higginbotham	(substituted on) 66'
SH	21	Nick Phipps	(substituted on) 78'
FH	22	Kurtley Beale	(substituted on) 60'
CE	23	Pat McCabe	(substituted on) 59'
Coach:
(Australia) Ewen McKenzie

FB	15	Brice Dulin
RW	14	Yoann Huget
OC	13	Mathieu Bastareaud
IC	12	Wesley Fofana
LW	11	Maxime Médard		(substituted off) 76'
FH	10	Rémi Talès
SH	9	Morgan Parra		(substituted off) 74'
N8	8	Damien Chouly
OF	7	Yannick Nyanga		(substituted off) 46'
BF	6	Thierry Dusautoir (c)		(substituted off) 66'
RL	5	Yoann Maestri
LL	4	Alexandre Flanquart		(substituted off) 65'
TP	3	Rabah Slimani		(substituted off) 49'
HK	2	Guilhem Guirado		(substituted off) 70'
LP	1	Alexandre Menini		(substituted off) 49'
Replacements:
HK	16	Brice Mach		(substituted on) 70'
PR	17	Thomas Domingo		(substituted on) 49'
PR	18	Nicolas Mas		(substituted on) 49'
FL	19	Bernard Le Roux	(yellow card) 68' to 78'	(substituted on) 65'
N8	20	Louis Picamoles		(substituted on) 66'
FL	21	Antoine Burban		(substituted on) 46'
FH	22	Frédéric Michalak		(substituted on) 74'
CE	23	Rémi Lamerat		(substituted on) 76'
Coach:
(France) Philippe Saint-André

Man of the Match:
Nic White (Australia)

Touch judges:
Craig Joubert (South Africa)
Chris Pollock (New Zealand)
Television match official:
Ben Skeen (New Zealand)

Notes:

- James Horwill earned his 50th test cap for Australia.
- Nathan Charles, Luke Jones and Laurie Weeks made their international debuts for Australia.
- Alexandre Menini made his international debut for France.
- Australia reclaim the Trophée des Bicentenaires for the first time since 2010, after losing it in 2012.
- This was the first time France has failed to score any points against Australia, in the 44 meetings between the two teams.
- Fewest points in an Australian win since their 6–3 win over New Zealand in 1958, and first Australian win without a try since their 21–13 win over Wales in 2001.

14 June 2014
17:00 SAST (UTC+02)

South Africa	38–16	Wales
Try: Habana (2) 6' c, 20' c Vermeulen 15' c Le Roux 37' c Hendricks 51' c Con: Steyn (5/5) 7', 17', 21', 38', 52'; Pen: Steyn (1/1) 44'	Report	Try: Cuthbert 68' c Con: Hook (1/1) 69'; Pen: Biggar (1/1) 40'; Drop: Biggar (2/2) 2', 19'

Kings Park Stadium, Durban
Referee: Romain Poite (France)

Team details

FB	15	Willie le Roux	(substituted off) 70'
RW	14	Cornal Hendricks
OC	13	JP Pietersen
IC	12	Jan Serfontein
LW	11	Bryan Habana
FH	10	Morné Steyn	(substituted off) 70'
SH	9	Fourie du Preez
N8	8	Duane Vermeulen
OF	7	Willem Alberts	(substituted off) 58'
BF	6	Francois Louw
RL	5	Victor Matfield (c)
LL	4	Bakkies Botha	(substituted off) 40'
TP	3	Jannie du Plessis	(substituted off) 58'
HK	2	Bismarck du Plessis	(substituted off) 70'
LP	1	Gurthrö Steenkamp	(substituted off) 44'
Replacements:
HK	16	Schalk Brits	(substituted on) 70'
PR	17	Tendai Mtawarira	(substituted on) 44'
PR	18	Coenie Oosthuizen	(substituted on) 58'
LK	19	Lood de Jager	(substituted on) 40'
FL	20	Schalk Burger	(substituted on) 58'
SH	21	Ruan Pienaar		(substituted on) 73'
FH	22	Johan Goosen	(substituted on) 70'	(substituted off) 73'
WG	23	Lwazi Mvovo	(substituted on) 70'
Coach:
(South Africa) Heyneke Meyer

FB	15	Liam Williams		(substituted off) 55'
RW	14	Alex Cuthbert
OC	13	Jonathan Davies
IC	12	Jamie Roberts	(yellow card) 12' to 22'
LW	11	George North
FH	10	Dan Biggar		(substituted off) 64'
SH	9	Mike Phillips		(substituted off) 55'
N8	8	Taulupe Faletau
OF	7	Aaron Shingler		(substituted off) 55'
BF	6	Dan Lydiate
RL	5	Alun Wyn Jones (c)
LL	4	Luke Charteris		(substituted off) 55'
TP	3	Adam Jones		(substituted off) 31'
HK	2	Ken Owens		(substituted off) 58'
LP	1	Gethin Jenkins		(substituted off) 58'
Replacements:
HK	16	Matthew Rees		(substituted on) 58'
PR	17	Paul James		(substituted on) 58'
PR	18	Samson Lee		(substituted on) 31'
LK	19	Ian Evans		(substituted on) 55'
FL	20	Josh Turnbull		(substituted on) 55'
SH	21	Gareth Davies		(substituted on) 55'
FH	22	James Hook		(substituted on) 64'
FB	23	Matthew Morgan		(substituted on) 55'
Coach:
(New Zealand) Warren Gatland

Man of the Match:
Willie le Roux (South Africa)

Touch judges:
Steve Walsh (Australia)
Marius Mitrea (Italy)
Television match official:
Vinny Munro (New Zealand)

Notes:

- Cornal Hendricks and Lood de Jager made their international debuts for South Africa.
- Victor Matfield joined John Smit as the most capped South African player with 111 caps.
- Gareth Davies and Matthew Morgan made their international debuts for Wales.
- Adam Jones played his 100th test match; 95 for Wales and 5 for the British and Irish Lions.

14 June 2014
14:10 EDT (UTC-04)

Canada	17–19	Scotland
Try: Hassler 22' m Pen: Pritchard (4/5) 20', 43', 51', 70'	Report	Try: Gilchrist 27' c Con: Laidlaw (1/1) 28'; Pen: Laidlaw (3/3) 2', 38', 71'; Hogg (1/1) 60'

BMO Field, Toronto
Attendance: 18,788
Referee: Mike Fraser (New Zealand)

Team details

FB	15	James Pritchard
RW	14	Jeff Hassler		(substituted off) 43'
OC	13	Ciaran Hearn
IC	12	Nick Blevins		(substituted off) 63'
LW	11	Taylor Paris
FH	10	Harry Jones
SH	9	Phil Mack		(substituted off) 70'
N8	8	Tyler Ardron (c)
OF	7	John Moonlight
BF	6	Jebb Sinclair	(red card) 75'
RL	5	Jamie Cudmore
LL	4	Tyler Hotson
TP	3	Jason Marshall		(substituted off) 77'
HK	2	Aaron Carpenter		(substituted off) 58'
LP	1	Hubert Buydens		(substituted off) 54'
Replacements:
HK	16	Ray Barkwill		(substituted on) 58'
PR	17	Andrew Tiedemann		(substituted on) 54'
PR	18	Jake Illnicki		(substituted on) 77'
FL	19	Kyle Gilmour
LK	20	Jon Phelan
SH	21	Gordon McRorie		(substituted on) 70'
FB	22	Connor Braid		(substituted on) 63'
WG	23	D. T. H. van der Merwe		(substituted on) 43'
Coach:
(New Zealand) Kieran Crowley

FB	15	Stuart Hogg
RW	14	Sean Maitland
OC	13	Sean Lamont
IC	12	Peter Horne
LW	11	Tim Visser	(substituted off) 73'
FH	10	Finn Russell	(substituted off) 61'
SH	9	Greig Laidlaw (c)
N8	8	Johnnie Beattie	(substituted off) 59'
OF	7	Kelly Brown	(substituted off) 47'
BF	6	Alasdair Strokosch	(substituted off) 30'
RL	5	Grant Gilchrist
LL	4	Richie Gray
TP	3	Moray Low	(substituted off) 51'
HK	2	Scott Lawson
LP	1	Gordon Reid
Replacements:
HK	16	Kevin Bryce	(substituted on) 59'
PR	17	Kyle Traynor
PR	18	Geoff Cross	(substituted on) 51'
FL	19	Kieran Low	(substituted on) 47'
FL	20	Blair Cowan	(substituted on) 30'
SH	21	Grayson Hart		(substituted on) 75'
FH	22	Ruaridh Jackson	(substituted on) 61'	(substituted off) 75'
CE	23	Max Evans	(substituted on) 73'
Coach:
(New Zealand) Vern Cotter

Man of the Match:
Greig Laidlaw (Scotland)

Touch judges:
Stuart Berry (South Africa)
Nick Ricono (United States)
Television match official:
Davey Ardrey (United States)

Notes:

- Kevin Bryce and Grayson Hart made their international debuts for Scotland.

14 June 2014
15:40 ART (UTC-03)

Argentina	17–23	Ireland
Try: Tuculet 24' c González Amorosino 79' c Con: Sánchez (1/1) 25'; González Iglesias (1/1) 79'; Pen: Sánchez (1/1) 16'	Report	Try: Zebo 50' c Madigan 72' c Con: Sexton (1/1) 51'; Madigan (1/1) 73'; Pen: Sexton (3/5) 4', 9', 31'

Estadio Monumental José Fierro, Tucumán
Referee: Pascal Gaüzère (France)

Team details

FB	15	Joaquín Tuculet		55' to 65'
RW	14	Lucas González Amorosino
OC	13	Jerónimo de la Fuente
IC	12	Gabriel Ascárate		(substituted off) 60'
LW	11	Manuel Montero
FH	10	Nicolás Sánchez			(substituted off) 65'
SH	9	Martín Landajo (c)		(substituted off) 63'
N8	8	Antonio Ahualli de Chazal		(substituted off) 11'	(substituted on) 19'	(substituted off) 63'
OF	7	Tomás de la Vega
BF	6	Rodrigo Báez
RL	5	Tomás Lavanini		(substituted off) 69'
LL	4	Manuel Carizza
TP	3	Ramiro Herrera		(substituted off) 51'	(substituted on) 68'
HK	2	Matías Cortese	(yellow card) 8' to 18'			(substituted off) 26'
LP	1	Lucas Noguera Paz			(substituted off) 68'
Replacements:
HK	16	Santiago Iglesias		(substituted on) 11'	(substituted off) 19'	(substituted on) 26'	(substituted off) 63'
PR	17	Bruno Postiglioni					(substituted on) 63'
PR	18	Matías Díaz		(substituted on) 51'
LK	19	Matías Alemano		(substituted on) 69'
FL	20	Javier Ortega Desio				(substituted on) 63'
SH	21	Tomás Cubelli		(substituted on) 63'
FB	22	Santiago González Iglesias		(substituted on) 60'
WG	23	Matías Orlando		(substituted on) 55'
Coach:
(Argentina) Daniel Hourcade

FB	15	Rob Kearney
RW	14	Andrew Trimble	(yellow card) 15' to 25'
OC	13	Fergus McFadden
IC	12	Darren Cave		(substituted off) 73'
LW	11	Simon Zebo
FH	10	Johnny Sexton		(substituted off) 64'
SH	9	Eoin Reddan		(substituted off) 77'
N8	8	Jamie Heaslip
OF	7	Chris Henry		(substituted off) 63'
BF	6	Rhys Ruddock
RL	5	Paul O'Connell (c)
LL	4	Devin Toner		(substituted off) 42'
TP	3	Mike Ross		(substituted off) 73'
HK	2	Rory Best		(substituted off) 73'
LP	1	Dave Kilcoyne		(substituted off) 57'
Replacements:
HK	16	Rob Herring		(substituted on) 77'
PR	17	James Cronin		(substituted on) 73'
PR	18	Jack McGrath		(substituted on) 57'
LK	19	Iain Henderson		(substituted on) 42'
FL	20	Jordi Murphy		(substituted on) 63'
SH	21	Kieran Marmion		(substituted on) 77'
FH	22	Ian Madigan		(substituted on) 64'
CE	23	Noel Reid		(substituted on) 73'
Coach:
(New Zealand) Joe Schmidt

Touch judges:
Glen Jackson (New Zealand)
John Lacey (Ireland)
Television match official:
Shaun Veldsman (South Africa)

Notes:

- James Cronin, Rob Herring and Noel Reid made their international debuts for Ireland.
- This was Ireland's first test series victory over Argentina, and with it, they retain the Admiral Brown Cup.

=== 17 June ===
17 June 2014
19:35 NZST (UTC+12)

Crusaders (New Zealand)	7–38	England
Try: Todd 21' c Con: Taylor (1/1) 23'	Report	Try: Gray 1' c Foden 6' m Barritt 28' c Goode 33' c Watson 58' c Pennell 80' m Con: Cipriani (3/4) 2', 30', 35'; Myler (1/2) 59'

Rugby League Park, Christchurch
Attendance: 17,500
Referee: Nigel Owens (Wales)

Team details

FB	15	(New Zealand) Tom Taylor
RW	14	(New Zealand) Johnny McNicholl
OC	13	(Samoa) Rey Lee-Lo	(substituted off) 67'
IC	12	(New Zealand) Kieron Fonotia	(substituted off) 50'
LW	11	(New Zealand) Nafi Tuitavake
FH	10	(New Zealand) Tyler Bleyendaal
SH	9	(New Zealand) Willi Heinz	(substituted off) 50'
N8	8	(New Zealand) Luke Whitelock
OF	7	(New Zealand) George Whitelock (c)	(substituted off) 18'
BF	6	(New Zealand) Jordan Taufua
RL	5	(New Zealand) Joel Everson
LL	4	(New Zealand) Jimmy Tupou	(substituted off) 30'
TP	3	(New Zealand) Nepo Laulala	(substituted off) 76'
HK	2	(New Zealand) Corey Flynn	(substituted off) 56'
LP	1	(New Zealand) Tim Perry	(substituted off) 56'
Replacements:
HK	16	(New Zealand) Ben Funnell	(substituted on) 56'
PR	17	(New Zealand) Joe Moody	(substituted on) 56'
PR	18	(Tonga) Siate Tokolahi	(substituted on) 76'
LK	19	(New Zealand) Scott Barrett	(substituted on) 30'
FL	20	(New Zealand) Matt Todd	(substituted on) 18'
SH	21	(New Zealand) Andrew Ellis	(substituted on) 50'
CE	22	(New Zealand) Adam Whitelock	(substituted on) 50'
WG	23	(New Zealand) Rob Thompson	(substituted on) 67'
Coach:
(New Zealand) Todd Blackadder

FB	15	Alex Goode	(substituted off) 56'
RW	14	Ben Foden
OC	13	Henry Trinder	(substituted off) 56'
IC	12	Brad Barritt
LW	11	Anthony Watson
FH	10	Danny Cipriani	(substituted off) 47'
SH	9	Lee Dickson	(substituted off) 47'
N8	8	Tom Johnson
OF	7	Matt Kvesic
BF	6	James Haskell
RL	5	Dave Attwood	(substituted off) 67'
LL	4	Ed Slater (c)
TP	3	Henry Thomas	(substituted off) 56'
HK	2	Joe Gray	(substituted off) 59'
LP	1	Alex Waller	(substituted off) 56'
Replacements:
HK	16	Dave Ward	(substituted on) 59'
PR	17	Nathan Catt	(substituted on) 56'
PR	18	Kyle Sinckler	(substituted on) 56'
LK	19	Michael Paterson	(substituted on) 67'
SH	20	Richard Wigglesworth	(substituted on) 47'
FH	21	Stephen Myler	(substituted on) 47'
WG	22	Jonny May	(substituted on) 56'
FB	23	Chris Pennell	(substituted on) 56'
Coach:
(England) Stuart Lancaster

Touch judges:
Andrew Lees (Australia)
James Leckie (Australia)
Television match official:
George Ayoub (Australia)

=== 20–22 June ===
20 June 2014
16:10 ART (UTC-03)

Argentina	19–21	Scotland
Try: Ortega Desio 13' m Tuculet 59' m Pen: Sánchez (2/2) 42', 57'; Drop: Sánchez (1/3) 27'	Report	Try: Hogg 6' c Pyrgos 73' m Con: Weir (1/2) 7'; Pen: Weir (3/4) 55', 70', 78'

Estadio Mario Alberto Kempes, Córdoba
Attendance: 22,000
Referee: John Lacey (Ireland)

Team details

FB	15	Lucas González Amorosino
RW	14	Santiago Cordero	(substituted off) 57'
OC	13	Matías Orlando	(substituted off) 61'
IC	12	Santiago González Iglesias
LW	11	Manuel Montero
FH	10	Nicolás Sánchez		(substituted off) 64'	(substituted on) 71'
SH	9	Tomás Cubelli (c)	(substituted off) 57'	(substituted on) 64'	(substituted off) 71'
N8	8	Tomás de la Vega
OF	7	Javier Ortega Desio	(substituted off) 56'
BF	6	Rodrigo Baez
RL	5	Matías Alemano	(substituted off) 55'
LL	4	Manuel Carizza
TP	3	Matías Díaz	(substituted off) 46'
HK	2	Julián Montoya	(substituted off) 50'
LP	1	Bruno Postiglioni	(substituted off) 57'
Replacements:
HK	16	Santiago Iglesias	(substituted on) 50'
PR	17	Lucas Noguera Paz	(substituted on) 57'
PR	18	Tetaz Chaparro	(substituted on) 46'
LK	19	Tomás Lavanini	(substituted on) 55'
N8	20	Antonio Ahualli de Chazal	(substituted on) 56'
SH	21	Martín Landajo	(substituted on) 57'
CE	22	Matías Moroni	(substituted on) 61'
FB	23	Joaquín Tuculet	(substituted on) 57'
Coach:
(Argentina) Daniel Hourcade

FB	15	Stuart Hogg
RW	14	Sean Maitland
OC	13	Nick De Luca
IC	12	Peter Horne	(substituted off) 64'
LW	11	Tommy Seymour
FH	10	Duncan Weir
SH	9	Grayson Hart	(substituted off) 47'
N8	8	Kieran Low
OF	7	Blair Cowan	(substituted off) 61'
BF	6	Rob Harley
RL	5	Grant Gilchrist (c)
LL	4	Jonny Gray	(substituted off) 55'
TP	3	Geoff Cross	(substituted off) 61'
HK	2	Ross Ford	(substituted off) 61'
LP	1	Alasdair Dickinson	(substituted off) 61'
Replacements:
HK	16	Pat MacArthur	(substituted on) 61'
PR	17	Gordon Reid	(substituted on) 61'
PR	18	Jon Welsh	(substituted on) 61'
LK	19	Tim Swinson	(substituted on) 55'
FL	20	Chris Fusaro	(substituted on) 61'
SH	21	Henry Pyrgos	(substituted on) 47'
FH	22	Tom Heathcote
WG	23	Dougie Fife	(substituted on) 64'
Coach:
(New Zealand) Vern Cotter

Touch judges:
Pascal Gaüzère (France)
Lourens van der Merwe (South Africa)
Television match official:
Deon van Bloomestein (South Africa)

Notes:

- Matías Moroni made his international debut for Argentina.

21 June 2014
14:00 JST (UTC+09)

Japan	26–23	Italy
Try: Yamada 4' c Sa'u 59' c Con: Goromaru (2/2) 5', 60'; Pen: Goromaru (4/5) 13', 22', 42', 48'	Report (In Italian)	Try: Penalty try 17' c Barbieri 74' c Con: Orquera (1/1) 17'; Allan (1/1) 75'; Pen: Orquera (3/3) 7', 35', 52'

Chichibunomiya Rugby Stadium, Tokyo
Attendance: 13,816
Referee: Jaco Peyper (South Africa)

Team details

FB	15	Ayumu Goromaru
RW	14	Akihito Yamada	(yellow card) 17' to 27'
OC	13	Male Sa'u
IC	12	Yuu Tamura
LW	11	Kenki Fukuoka
FH	10	Harumichi Tatekawa
SH	9	Fumiaki Tanaka
N8	8	Koliniasi Holani		59' to 64'		(substituted off) 74'
OF	7	Michael Leitch (c)
BF	6	Justin Ives
RL	5	Luke Thompson		(substituted off) 74'
LL	4	Shoji Ito		(substituted off) 64'
TP	3	Kensuke Hatakeyama		(substituted off) 74'
HK	2	Shota Horie
LP	1	Masataka Mikami		(substituted off) 63'
Replacements:
PR	16	Hisateru Hirashima		(substituted on) 63'
HK	17	Takeshi Kizu
PR	18	Hiroshi Yamashita		(substituted on) 74'
LK	19	Shinya Makabe		(substituted on) 59'	(substituted off) 64'	(substituted on) 74'
LK	20	Hitoshi Ono		(substituted on) 64'
FL	21	Hendrik Tui		(substituted on) 74'
SH	22	Atsushi Hiwasa
WG	23	Toshiaki Hirose
Coach:
(Australia) Eddie Jones

FB	15	Luke McLean
RW	14	Leonardo Sarto		(substituted off) 74'
OC	13	Michele Campagnaro
IC	12	Andrea Masi
LW	11	Giovanbattista Venditti	(yellow card) 42' to 52'
FH	10	Luciano Orquera		(substituted off) 74'
SH	9	Tito Tebaldi		(substituted off) 64'
N8	8	Robert Barbieri
OF	7	Mauro Bergamasco		(substituted off) 60'
BF	6	Joshua Furno
RL	5	Marco Bortolami		(substituted off) 68'
LL	4	Quintin Geldenhuys (c)
TP	3	Lorenzo Cittadini		(substituted off) 59'
HK	2	Leonardo Ghiraldini		(substituted off) 67'
LP	1	Alberto De Marchi		(substituted off) 59'
Replacements:
HK	16	Andrea Manici		(substituted on) 67'
PR	17	Andrea de Marchi		(substituted on) 59'
PR	18	Dario Chistolini		(substituted on) 59'
LK	19	Marco Fuser		(substituted on) 68'
N8	20	Manoa Vosawai		(substituted on) 60'
SH	21	Guglielmo Palazzani		(substituted on) 64'
FH	22	Tommaso Allan		(substituted on) 74'
CE	23	Gonzalo Garcia		(substituted on) 74'
Coach:
(France) Jacques Brunel

Touch judges:
Garratt Williamson (New Zealand)
Brendon Pickerill (New Zealand)
Television match official:
Peter Marshall (Australia)

Notes:

- Mauro Bergamasco becomes the sixth Italian player to earn 100 test caps.
- This win was Japan's tenth consecutive win, a record for a Tier 2 nation.

21 June 2014
15:00 AEST (UTC+10)

Australia	39–13	France
Try: Skelton 7' c Folau (2) 26' c, 41' c Hooper 60' c Phipps 73' m Con: Foley (4/5) 9', 27', 42', 61'; Pen: Foley (2/2) 2', 17'	Report	Try: Guirado 65' c Con: Machenaud (1/1) 65'; Pen: Machenaud (1/2) 34'; Dulin (1/1) 15'

Sydney Football Stadium, Sydney
Attendance: 43,188
Referee: Chris Pollock (New Zealand)

Team details

FB	15	Israel Folau
RW	14	Adam Ashley-Cooper
OC	13	Tevita Kuridrani	(substituted off) 70'
IC	12	Matt To'omua	(substituted off) 54'
LW	11	Nick Cummins
FH	10	Bernard Foley
SH	9	Nic White	(substituted off) 58'
N8	8	Wycliff Palu	(substituted off) 63'
OF	7	Michael Hooper (c)
BF	6	Scott Fardy
RL	5	Rob Simmons
LL	4	Will Skelton	(substituted off) 56'
TP	3	Sekope Kepu	(substituted off) 58'
HK	2	Tatafu Polota-Nau	(substituted off) 68'
LP	1	James Slipper	(substituted off) 52'
Replacements:
HK	16	Nathan Charles	(substituted on) 68'
PR	17	Scott Sio	(substituted on) 52'
PR	18	Laurie Weeks	(substituted on) 58'
LK	19	James Horwill	(substituted on) 56'
N8	20	Ben McCalman	(substituted on) 63'
SH	21	Nick Phipps	(substituted on) 58'
FH	22	Kurtley Beale	(substituted on) 54'
WG	23	Rob Horne	(substituted on) 70'
Coach:
(Australia) Ewen McKenzie

FB	15	Brice Dulin
RW	14	Yoann Huget
OC	13	Mathieu Bastareaud
IC	12	Wesley Fofana
LW	11	Hugo Bonneval		(substituted off) 43'
FH	10	Rémi Talès		(substituted off) 70'
SH	9	Maxime Machenaud
N8	8	Damien Chouly		(substituted off) 58'
OF	7	Fulgence Ouedraogo		(substituted off) 50'
BF	6	Thierry Dusautoir (c)
RL	5	Yoann Maestri
LL	4	Alexandre Flanquart		(substituted off) 59'
TP	3	Rabah Slimani	(yellow card) 26' to 36'	(substituted off) 47'
HK	2	Guilhem Guirado		(substituted off) 68'
LP	1	Alexandre Menini		(substituted off) 47'
Replacements:
HK	16	Christopher Tolofua		(substituted on) 68'
PR	17	Vincent Debaty		(substituted on) 47'
PR	18	Thomas Domingo		(substituted on) 47'
FL	19	Bernard Le Roux		(substituted on) 59'
N8	20	Louis Picamoles		(substituted on) 58'
FL	21	Yannick Nyanga		(substituted on) 50'
FH	22	Frédéric Michalak		(substituted on) 70'
CE	23	Rémi Lamerat		(substituted on) 43'
Coach:
(France) Phillipe Saint-Andre

Man of the Match:
Wycliff Palu (Australia)

Touch judges:
Wayne Barnes (England)
George Clancy (Ireland)
Television match official:
Ben Skeen (New Zealand)

Notes:

- Will Skelton made his international debut for Australia.
- The 43,188-person crowd was a record crowd for an Australian test at Allianz Stadium.

21 June 2014
19:35 NZST (UTC+12)

New Zealand	36–13	England
Try: Savea (3) 3' m, 8' c, 80' c Smith (2) 26' c, 33' c Con: Cruden (3/4) 9', 27', 34'; Barrett (1/1) 80'; Pen: Cruden (1/1) 17'	Report	Try: Yarde 42' c Con: Burns (1/1) 43'; Pen: Burns (2/3) 7', 19'

Waikato Stadium, Hamilton
Referee: Jérôme Garcès (France)

Team details

FB	15	Ben Smith
RW	14	Cory Jane
OC	13	Malakai Fekitoa		(substituted off) 63'
IC	12	Ma'a Nonu
LW	11	Julian Savea
FH	10	Aaron Cruden		(substituted off) 44'
SH	9	Aaron Smith		(substituted off) 74'
N8	8	Kieran Read		(substituted off) 40'
OF	7	Richie McCaw (c)
BF	6	Jerome Kaino			(substituted off) 74'
RL	5	Sam Whitelock
LL	4	Brodie Retallick		(substituted off) 76'
TP	3	Owen Franks		(substituted off) 58'
HK	2	Dane Coles		(substituted off) 44'
LP	1	Tony Woodcock		(substituted off) 63'	(substituted on) 74'
Replacements:
HK	16	Keven Mealamu		(substituted on) 44'
PR	17	Wyatt Crockett	(yellow card) 72' to 80'	(substituted on) 63'
PR	18	Charlie Faumuina		(substituted on) 58'
LK	19	Patrick Tuipulotu		(substituted on) 76'
FL	20	Liam Messam		(substituted on) 40'
SH	21	TJ Perenara		(substituted on) 74'
FH	22	Beauden Barrett		(substituted on) 44'
CE	23	Ryan Crotty		(substituted on) 63'
Coach:
(New Zealand) Steve Hansen

FB	15	Mike Brown
RW	14	Chris Ashton
OC	13	Manu Tuilagi
IC	12	Kyle Eastmond		(substituted off) 40'
LW	11	Marland Yarde
FH	10	Freddie Burns		(substituted off) 59'
SH	9	Ben Youngs		(substituted off) 71'
N8	8	Billy Vunipola	(yellow card) 20' to 30'	(substituted off) 56'
OF	7	Chris Robshaw (c)
BF	6	Tom Wood
RL	5	Courtney Lawes
LL	4	Joe Launchbury		(substituted off) 21'	(substituted on) 28'	(substituted off) 65'
TP	3	David Wilson		(substituted off) 56'
HK	2	Dylan Hartley		(substituted off) 58'
LP	1	Joe Marler		(substituted off) 65'
Replacements:
HK	16	Rob Webber		(substituted on) 58'
PR	17	Matt Mullan		(substituted on) 65'
PR	18	Kieran Brookes		(substituted on) 56'
LK	19	Dave Attwood		(substituted on) 21'	(substituted off) 28'	(substituted on) 65'
N8	20	Ben Morgan		(substituted on) 56'
SH	21	Lee Dickson		(substituted on) 71'
FH	22	Danny Cipriani		(substituted on) 59'
CE	23	Luther Burrell		(substituted on) 40'
Coach:
(England) Stuart Lancaster

Man of the Match:
Julian Savea (New Zealand)

Touch judges:
Nigel Owens (Wales)
James Leckie (Australia)
Television match official:
George Ayoub (Australia)

21 June 2014
15:00 SAST (UTC+02)

South Africa	31–30	Wales
Try: Penalty try (2) 32' c, 77' c Hendricks 33' c Le Roux 71' c Con: Steyn (4/4) 32', 35', 72', 78'; Pen: Steyn (1/2) 55'	Report	Try: Roberts 18' c Cuthbert 21' c Owens 45' c Con: Biggar (3/3) 19', 22', 45'; Pen: Biggar (3/4) 12', 56', 65'

Mbombela Stadium, Nelspruit
Attendance: 25,424
Referee: Steve Walsh (Australia)

Team details

FB	15	Willie le Roux
RW	14	Cornal Hendricks
OC	13	JP Pietersen
IC	12	Jan Serfontein		(substituted off) 74'
LW	11	Bryan Habana
FH	10	Morné Steyn		23' to 29'
SH	9	Fourie du Preez
N8	8	Duane Vermeulen
OF	7	Willem Alberts		(substituted off) 24'
BF	6	Francois Louw
RL	5	Victor Matfield (c)
LL	4	Flip van der Merwe	(yellow card) 57' to 67'	45' to 49'
TP	3	Jannie du Plessis		(substituted off) 58'
HK	2	Bismarck du Plessis		(substituted off) 65'
LP	1	Tendai Mtawarira		(substituted off) 65'
Replacements:
HK	16	Schalk Brits		(substituted on) 65'
PR	17	Gurthrö Steenkamp		(substituted on) 65'
PR	18	Coenie Oosthuizen		(substituted on) 58'
LK	19	Lood de Jager		(substituted on) 45'	(substituted off) 49'
FL	20	Schalk Burger		(substituted on) 24'
SH	21	Ruan Pienaar		(substituted on) 23'	(substituted off) 29'
CE	22	Wynand Olivier		(substituted on) 74'
WG	23	Lwazi Mvovo
Coach:
(South Africa) Heyneke Meyer

FB	15	Liam Williams
RW	14	Alex Cuthbert
OC	13	Jonathan Davies
IC	12	Jamie Roberts
LW	11	George North
FH	10	Dan Biggar	(yellow card) 32' to 42'
SH	9	Mike Phillips
N8	8	Taulupe Faletau
OF	7	Josh Turnbull
BF	6	Dan Lydiate
RL	5	Alun Wyn Jones (c)
LL	4	Luke Charteris	(yellow card) 29' to 39'	(substituted off) 74'
TP	3	Samson Lee		(substituted off) 51'
HK	2	Ken Owens		(substituted off) 74'
LP	1	Gethin Jenkins		(substituted off) 74'
Replacements:
HK	16	Matthew Rees		(substituted on) 74'
PR	17	Paul James		(substituted on) 74'
PR	18	Aaron Jarvis		(substituted on) 51'
LK	19	Jake Ball		(substituted on) 74'
N8	20	Dan Baker
SH	21	Gareth Davies
FH	22	James Hook
FB	23	Matthew Morgan
Coach:
(New Zealand) Warren Gatland

Man of the Match:
Duane Vermeulen (South Africa)

Touch judges:
Romain Poite (France)
Francisco Pastrana (Argentina)
Television match official:
Glenn Newman (New Zealand)

Notes:

- Victor Matfield surpassed John Smit, to become South Africa's most capped player with 112 caps.
- South Africa retain the Prince William Cup for the seventh time.

22 June 2014
15:00 NZST (UTC+12)

Pacific Barbarians	14–36	Tonga

Mount Smart Stadium, Auckland
Referee: Nick Briant (New Zealand)

=== 28 June ===
28 June 2014
17:00 SAST (UTC+02)

South Africa	55–6	Scotland
Try: Coetzee (2) 3' c, 51' c Le Roux 10' c Mvovo (2) 16' m, 61' c Pietersen 56' m De Jager (2) 64' c, 78' c Con: Pollard (5/7) 4', 11', 52', 62', 65'; Boshoff 79'; Pen: Pollard (1/1) 44'	Report	Pen: Weir (2/2) 7', 36'

Nelson Mandela Bay Stadium, Port Elizabeth
Attendance: 40,973
Referee: Glen Jackson (New Zealand)

Team details

FB	15	Willie le Roux	21' to 27'		(substituted off) 75'
RW	14	Cornal Hendricks
OC	13	JP Pietersen
IC	12	Jan Serfontein
LW	11	Lwazi Mvovo
FH	10	Handré Pollard	(substituted off) 70'
SH	9	Fourie du Preez	(substituted off) 28'
N8	8	Duane Vermeulen	(substituted off) 66'
OF	7	Schalk Burger
BF	6	Marcell Coetzee
RL	5	Victor Matfield (c)	(substituted off) 70'
LL	4	Lood de Jager
TP	3	Jannie du Plessis	(substituted off) 70'
HK	2	Bismarck du Plessis	(substituted off) 54'
LP	1	Coenie Oosthuizen	(substituted off) 50'
Replacements:
HK	16	Adriaan Strauss	(substituted on) 54'
PR	17	Trevor Nyakane	(substituted on) 70'
PR	18	Marcel van der Merwe	(substituted on) 50'
LK	19	Stephan Lewies	(substituted on) 70'
FL	20	Oupa Mohojé	(substituted on) 66'
SH	21	Francois Hougaard	(substituted on) 29'
FH	22	Marnitz Boshoff	(substituted on) 70'
FB	23	Zane Kirchner	(substituted on) 21'	(substituted off) 27'	(substituted on) 75'
Coach:
(South Africa) Heyneke Meyer

FB	15	Stuart Hogg		(substituted off) 71'
RW	14	Sean Maitland		(substituted off) 53'
OC	13	Nick De Luca
IC	12	Peter Horne
LW	11	Tommy Seymour
FH	10	Duncan Weir
SH	9	Henry Pyrgos		(substituted off) 76'
N8	8	Adam Ashe
OF	7	Chris Fusaro		(substituted off) 49'
BF	6	Rob Harley
RL	5	Grant Gilchrist (c)
LL	4	Tim Swinson	(yellow card) 50' to 60'	(substituted off) 60'
TP	3	Geoff Cross		(substituted off) 50'
HK	2	Ross Ford		(substituted off) 60'
LP	1	Alasdair Dickinson		(substituted off) 79'
Replacements:
HK	16	Kevin Bryce		(substituted on) 60'
PR	17	Moray Low		(substituted on) 79'
PR	18	Euan Murray		(substituted on) 50'
LK	19	Jonny Gray		(substituted on) 60'
FL	20	Tyrone Holmes		(substituted on) 49'
SH	21	Grayson Hart		(substituted on) 76'
WG	22	Dougie Fife		(substituted on) 53'
FB	23	Peter Murchie		(substituted on) 71'
Coach:
(New Zealand) Vern Cotter

Man of the Match:
JP Pietersen (South Africa)

Touch judges:
Romain Poite (France)
Marius Mitrea (Italy)
Television match official:
Glenn Newman (New Zealand)

Notes:

- Marnitz Boshoff, Stephan Lewies, Marcel van der Merwe, Oupa Mohojé and Handré Pollard made their international debuts for South Africa.
- Adam Ashe and Tyrone Holmes made their international debuts for Scotland.

== See also ==
- Mid-year rugby union tests
- End-of-year rugby union tests
- 2014 Africa Cup
- 2014 Asian Five Nations
- 2014 IRB Nations Cup
- 2014 IRB Tbilisi Cup
- 2014 end-of-year rugby union tests
