= 2014 Scotland rugby union tour of the Americas and South Africa =

- Coach: Vern Cotter
- Tour captain(s): Greig Laidlaw; Grant Gilchrist
- Top test point scorer: Greig Laidlaw (20)
- Top test try scorer: Stuart Hogg (2)
Summary
P	W	D	L
Total
4	3	0	1
Test match
4	3	0	1
Opponent
P	W	D	L
Argentina
1	1	0	0
Canada
1	1	0	0
South Africa
1	0	0	1
United States
1	1	0	0

Tour chronology
- ← Aus, Fij & Sam 2012 Japan 2016 →

In June 2014, the Scotland rugby union team played single test matches against four countries; Argentina, Canada, South Africa and the United States. The opening three tests, United States, Canada and Argentina, coincided with the June international window, whereas the test against South Africa fell outside the international window. This meant players playing outside Scotland at club level were not permitted to be released by their clubs to represent Scotland against South Africa; Scotland effectively picked two separate squads, one for the USA and Canada games, the other for Argentina and South Africa.

The tour was the start of Vern Cotter's period in charge. Head coach Andy Robinson had resigned in November 2012, and the Scottish Rugby Union had appointed the subsequent interim coach Scott Johnson as Director of Rugby. Scotland lost their match to South Africa but won all three of their Americas tests.

== Fixtures ==
Date and time	Venue	Home	Score	Away
7 June 2014, 19:30 CDT (UTC-05)	BBVA Compass Stadium, Houston	United States	6–24	Scotland
14 June 2014, 14:10 EDT (UTC-04)	BMO Field, Toronto	Canada	17–19	Scotland
20 June 2014, 16:20 ART (UTC-03)	Estadio Mario Alberto Kempes, Córdoba	Argentina	19–21	Scotland
28 June 2014, 17:00 SAST (UTC+02)	Nelson Mandela Bay Stadium, Port Elizabeth	South Africa	55–6	Scotland

== Squads ==
On 20 May, Head Coach Vern Cotter named two squads for the tour; a 27-man squad for the North America leg and a 25-man squad for the Argentina-South Africa leg - 9 players were initially named in both squads. The reasoning was for Cotter to look at as many players as possible. It also meant that players playing outside Scotland at club level, were not selected in the Argentina-South Africa squad, which was predominantly made up of Glasgow Warriors and Edinburgh Rugby players.

Jack Cuthbert, Matt Scott, Ross Rennie and Ryan Wilson were not considered due to injury.

Head coach: (New Zealand) Vern Cotter

=== North America leg ===
On 1 June, Grayson Hart was added to the North America squad, in addition to the Argentina-South Africa squad, to cover the injured Chris Cusiter. While Mark Bennett was also added to the North America squad to cover the injured Alex Dunbar, who was ruled out of whole tour.

On 2 June, Tom Heathcote and Ruaridh Jackson swapped positions on tour. Jackson was moved to the North America squad, and Heathcote was moved to the Argentina-South Africa squad.

On 9 June, Tim Swinson and Peter Horne were added to the North America squad, in addition to the Argentina-South Africa squad, to cover the injured Duncan Taylor and Jim Hamilton.

Note: Caps and ages are to pre United States match - 7 June 2014.

Note: Flags indicate national union for the club/province as defined by World Rugby.

Player	Position	Date of birth (age)	Caps	Club/province
Kevin Bryce	Hooker	7 September 1988 (aged 25)	0	(Scotland) Glasgow Warriors
Scott Lawson	Hooker	28 September 1981 (aged 32)	43	(England) Newcastle Falcons
Pat MacArthur	Hooker	27 April 1987 (aged 27)	4	(Scotland) Glasgow Warriors
Alex Allan	Prop	28 February 1992 (aged 22)	0	(Scotland) Glasgow Warriors
Geoff Cross	Prop	11 December 1982 (aged 31)	28	(England) London Irish
Moray Low	Prop	28 November 1984 (aged 29)	26	(England) Exeter Chiefs
Gordon Reid	Prop	4 March 1987 (aged 27)	0	(Scotland) Glasgow Warriors
Kyle Traynor	Prop	27 February 1986 (aged 28)	4	(England) Bristol
Grant Gilchrist	Lock	9 August 1990 (aged 23)	4	(Scotland) Edinburgh
Richie Gray	Lock	24 August 1989 (aged 24)	37	(France) Castres
Jim Hamilton	Lock	17 November 1982 (aged 31)	55	(England) Saracens
Tim Swinson	Lock	17 February 1987 (aged 27)	7	(Scotland) Glasgow Warriors
Kelly Brown	Flanker	8 June 1982 (aged 31)	63	(England) Saracens
Blair Cowan	Flanker	21 April 1986 (aged 28)	0	(England) London Irish
Kieran Low	Flanker	27 January 1991 (aged 23)	1	(England) London Irish
Alasdair Strokosch	Flanker	21 February 1983 (aged 31)	38	(France) Perpignan
Johnnie Beattie	Number 8	21 November 1985 (aged 28)	30	(France) Castres
David Denton	Number 8	5 February 1990 (aged 24)	22	(Scotland) Edinburgh
Chris Cusiter	Scrum-half	13 June 1982 (aged 31)	68	(England) Sale Sharks
Grayson Hart	Scrum-half	19 June 1988 (aged 25)	0	(Scotland) Edinburgh
Greig Laidlaw	Scrum-half	12 October 1985 (aged 28)	29	(England) Gloucester
Ruaridh Jackson	Fly-half	12 February 1988 (aged 26)	23	(England) London Wasps
Finn Russell	Fly-half	23 September 1992 (aged 21)	0	(Scotland) Glasgow Warriors
Mark Bennett	Centre	3 March 1993 (aged 21)	0	(Scotland) Glasgow Warriors
Alex Dunbar	Centre	23 April 1990 (aged 24)	8	(Scotland) Glasgow Warriors
Max Evans	Centre	28 September 1983 (aged 30)	42	(France) Castres
Peter Horne	Centre	5 October 1989 (aged 24)	2	(Scotland) Glasgow Warriors
Duncan Taylor	Centre	5 September 1989 (aged 24)	10	(England) Saracens
Sean Lamont	Wing	15 January 1981 (aged 33)	86	(Scotland) Glasgow Warriors
Sean Maitland	Wing	14 September 1988 (aged 25)	9	(Scotland) Glasgow Warriors
Tim Visser	Wing	29 May 1987 (aged 27)	12	(Scotland) Edinburgh
Stuart Hogg	Fullback	24 June 1992 (aged 21)	20	(Scotland) Glasgow Warriors

=== Argentina-South Africa leg ===
On 2 June, Tom Heathcote and Ruaridh Jackson swapped positions on tour. Jackson was moved to the North America squad, and Heathcote was moved to the Argentina-South Africa squad.

On 15 June, Kieran Low and Blair Cowan was added to the Argentina-South Africa squad to face Argentina to cover the injured Kelly Brown and Alasdair Strokosch, who were under assessment to feature in the Argentina match.

On 16 June, Nick De Luca was added to the Argentina-South Africa squad to cover the backs.

On 21 June, Adam Ashe, Tyrone Holmes and Euan Murray were added to the squad ahead of the final tour match against South Africa.

Note: Caps and ages are to pre Argentina match - 20 June 2014.

Note: Flags indicate national union for the club/province as defined by World Rugby.

Player	Position	Date of birth (age)	Caps	Club/province
Kevin Bryce	Hooker	7 September 1988 (aged 25)	1	(Scotland) Glasgow Warriors
Ross Ford	Hooker	23 April 1984 (aged 30)	75	(Scotland) Edinburgh
Pat MacArthur	Hooker	27 April 1987 (aged 27)	5	(Scotland) Glasgow Warriors
Geoff Cross	Prop	11 December 1982 (aged 31)	30	(England) London Irish
Alasdair Dickinson	Prop	11 September 1983 (aged 30)	34	(Scotland) Edinburgh
Moray Low	Prop	28 November 1984 (aged 29)	28	(England) Exeter Chiefs
Euan Murray	Prop	7 August 1980 (aged 33)	59	(Scotland) Glasgow Warriors
Gordon Reid	Prop	4 March 1987 (aged 27)	2	(Scotland) Glasgow Warriors
Jon Welsh	Prop	13 October 1986 (aged 27)	2	(Scotland) Glasgow Warriors
Grant Gilchrist	Lock	9 August 1990 (aged 23)	6	(Scotland) Edinburgh
Jonny Gray	Lock	14 March 1994 (aged 20)	3	(Scotland) Glasgow Warriors
Tim Swinson	Lock	17 February 1987 (aged 27)	7	(Scotland) Glasgow Warriors
Blair Cowan	Flanker	21 April 1986 (aged 28)	2	(England) London Irish
Chris Fusaro	Flanker	21 July 1989 (aged 24)	2	(Scotland) Glasgow Warriors
Rob Harley	Flanker	26 May 1990 (aged 24)	4	(Scotland) Glasgow Warriors
Tyrone Holmes	Flanker	15 April 1986 (aged 28)	0	(Scotland) Glasgow Warriors
Kieran Low	Flanker	27 January 1991 (aged 23)	3	(England) London Irish
Adam Ashe	Number 8	24 July 1993 (aged 20)	0	(Scotland) Glasgow Warriors
David Denton	Number 8	5 February 1990 (aged 24)	22	(Scotland) Edinburgh
Grayson Hart	Scrum-half	19 June 1988 (aged 26)	1	(Scotland) Edinburgh
Henry Pyrgos	Scrum-half	9 July 1989 (aged 24)	10	(Scotland) Glasgow Warriors
Tom Heathcote	Fly-half	11 February 1992 (aged 22)	3	(Scotland) Edinburgh
Duncan Weir	Fly-half	10 May 1991 (aged 23)	13	(Scotland) Glasgow Warriors
Nick De Luca	Centre	1 February 1984 (aged 30)	41	(France) Biarritz
Alex Dunbar	Centre	23 April 1990 (aged 24)	8	(Scotland) Glasgow Warriors
Peter Horne	Centre	5 October 1989 (aged 24)	3	(Scotland) Glasgow Warriors
Dougie Fife	Wing	8 August 1990 (aged 23)	1	(Scotland) Edinburgh
Sean Maitland	Wing	14 September 1988 (aged 25)	11	(Scotland) Glasgow Warriors
Tommy Seymour	Wing	1 July 1988 (aged 25)	8	(Scotland) Glasgow Warriors
Stuart Hogg	Fullback	24 June 1992 (aged 21)	22	(Scotland) Glasgow Warriors
Peter Murchie	Fullback	7 January 1986 (aged 28)	2	(Scotland) Glasgow Warriors

== Matches ==
=== United States ===
7 June 2014
19:30 CDT (UTC-05)

United States	6–24	Scotland
Pen: Wyles (2/3) 11', 51'	Report	Try: Visser 15' c Penalty try 30' c Hogg 66' c Con: Laidlaw (3/3) 16', 31', 67'; Pen: Laidlaw (1/2) 6'

BBVA Compass Stadium, Houston
Attendance: 20,001
Referee: Pascal Gaüzère (France)

United States	Scotland

FB	15	Chris Wyles
RW	14	Blaine Scully
OC	13	Seamus Kelly
IC	12	Andrew Suniula		(substituted off) 19'
LW	11	Luke Hume
FH	10	Shalom Suniula
SH	9	Mike Petri		(substituted off) 70'
N8	8	Cam Dolan
OF	7	Scott LaValla
BF	6	Todd Clever (c)		77' to 79'
RL	5	Hayden Smith		(substituted off) 29'	(substituted on) 39'	(substituted off) 53'
LL	4	Louis Stanfill		(substituted off) 63'
TP	3	Eric Fry				(substituted off) 40'
HK	2	Phil Thiel		(substituted off) 18'
LP	1	Olive Kilifi	(yellow card) 29' to 39'	(substituted off) 52'
Replacements:
HK	16	Tom Coolican		(substituted on) 18'
PR	17	Nicholas Wallace		(substituted on) 29'	(substituted off) 39'	(substituted on) 40'
PR	18	Titi Lamositele		(substituted on) 52'
LK	19	Tai Tuisamoa		(substituted on) 63'
FL	20	Danny Barrett				(substituted on) 53'
CE	21	Folau Niua		(substituted on) 19'
CE	22	Chad London		(substituted on) 77'	(substituted off) 79'
WG	23	Tim Maupin		(substituted on) 70'
Coach:
(United States) Mike Tolkin

FB	15	Stuart Hogg	(substituted off) 74'
RW	14	Sean Maitland
OC	13	Sean Lamont
IC	12	Duncan Taylor	(substituted off) 62'
LW	11	Tim Visser
FH	10	Finn Russell
SH	9	Greig Laidlaw (c)
N8	8	Johnnie Beattie
OF	7	Blair Cowan
BF	6	Alasdair Strokosch	(substituted off) 62'
RL	5	Jim Hamilton	(substituted off) 37'
LL	4	Richie Gray
TP	3	Geoff Cross	(substituted off) 44'
HK	2	Scott Lawson	(substituted off) 62'
LP	1	Gordon Reid	(substituted off) 55'
Replacements:
HK	16	Pat MacArthur	(substituted on) 62'
PR	17	Alex Allan	(substituted on) 55'
PR	18	Moray Low	(substituted on) 44'
LK	19	Grant Gilchrist	(substituted on) 37'
FL	20	Kieran Low	(substituted on) 62'
SH	21	Grayson Hart
FH	22	Ruaridh Jackson	(substituted on) 74'
CE	23	Max Evans	(substituted on) 62'
Coach:
(New Zealand) Vern Cotter

Man of the Match:
Stuart Hogg (Scotland)

Touch judges:
Francisco Pastrana (Argentina)
Chris Assmus (Canada)
Television match official:
Andrew Hosie (Canada)

Notes:

- Danny Barrett made his international debut for the United States.
- Alex Allan, Blair Cowan, Gordon Reid and Finn Russell made their international debuts for Scotland.

=== Canada ===
14 June 2014
14:10 EDT (UTC-04)

Canada	17–19	Scotland
Try: Hassler 22' m Con: Pritchard (0/1); Pen: Pritchard (4/5) 20', 43', 51', 70'	Report	Try: Gilchrist 27' c Con: Laidlaw (1/1) 28'; Pen: Laidlaw (3/3) 2', 38', 71'; Hogg (1/1) 60'

BMO Field, Toronto
Attendance: 18,788
Referee: Mike Fraser (New Zealand)

Canada	Scotland

FB	15	James Pritchard
RW	14	Jeff Hassler		(substituted off) 43'
OC	13	Ciaran Hearn
IC	12	Nick Blevins		(substituted off) 63'
LW	11	Taylor Paris
FH	10	Harry Jones
SH	9	Phil Mack		(substituted off) 70'
N8	8	Tyler Ardron (c)
OF	7	John Moonlight
BF	6	Jebb Sinclair	(red card) 75'
RL	5	Jamie Cudmore
LL	4	Tyler Hotson
TP	3	Jason Marshall		(substituted off) 77'
HK	2	Aaron Carpenter		(substituted off) 58'
LP	1	Hubert Buydens		(substituted off) 54'
Replacements:
HK	16	Ray Barkwill		(substituted on) 58'
PR	17	Andrew Tiedemann		(substituted on) 54'
PR	18	Jake Illnicki		(substituted on) 77'
FL	19	Kyle Gilmour
LK	20	Jon Phelan
SH	21	Gordon McRorie		(substituted on) 70'
FB	22	Connor Braid		(substituted on) 63'
WG	23	D. T. H. van der Merwe		(substituted on) 43'
Coach:
(New Zealand) Kieran Crowley

FB	15	Stuart Hogg
RW	14	Sean Maitland
OC	13	Sean Lamont
IC	12	Peter Horne
LW	11	Tim Visser	(substituted off) 73'
FH	10	Finn Russell	(substituted off) 61'
SH	9	Greig Laidlaw (c)
N8	8	Johnnie Beattie	(substituted off) 59'
OF	7	Kelly Brown	(substituted off) 47'
BF	6	Alasdair Strokosch	(substituted off) 30'
RL	5	Grant Gilchrist
LL	4	Richie Gray
TP	3	Moray Low	(substituted off) 51'
HK	2	Scott Lawson
LP	1	Gordon Reid
Replacements:
HK	16	Kevin Bryce	(substituted on) 59'
PR	17	Kyle Traynor
PR	18	Geoff Cross	(substituted on) 51'
FL	19	Kieran Low	(substituted on) 47'
FL	20	Blair Cowan	(substituted on) 30'
SH	21	Grayson Hart		(substituted on) 75'
FH	22	Ruaridh Jackson	(substituted on) 61'	(substituted off) 75'
CE	23	Max Evans	(substituted on) 73'
Coach:
(New Zealand) Vern Cotter

Man of the Match:
Greig Laidlaw (Scotland)

Touch judges:
Stuart Berry (South Africa)
Nick Ricono (United States)
Television match official:
Davey Ardrey (United States)

Notes:

- Kevin Bryce and Grayson Hart made their international debuts for Scotland.

=== Argentina ===
20 June 2014
16:10 ART (UTC-03)

Argentina	19–21	Scotland
Try: Ortega Desio 13' m Tuculet 59' m Pen: Sánchez (2/2) 42', 57'; Drop: Sánchez (1/3) 27'	Report	Try: Hogg 6' c Pyrgos 73' m Con: Weir (1/2) 7'; Pen: Weir (3/4) 55', 70', 78'

Estadio Mario Alberto Kempes, Córdoba
Attendance: 22,000
Referee: John Lacey (Ireland)

Argentina	Scotland

FB	15	Lucas González Amorosino
RW	14	Santiago Cordero	(substituted off) 57'
OC	13	Matías Orlando	(substituted off) 61'
IC	12	Santiago González Iglesias
LW	11	Manuel Montero
FH	10	Nicolás Sánchez		(substituted off) 64'	(substituted on) 71'
SH	9	Tomás Cubelli (c)	(substituted off) 57'	(substituted on) 64'	(substituted off) 71'
N8	8	Tomás de la Vega
OF	7	Javier Ortega Desio	(substituted off) 56'
BF	6	Rodrigo Baez
RL	5	Matías Alemanno	(substituted off) 55'
LL	4	Manuel Carizza
TP	3	Matías Díaz	(substituted off) 46'
HK	2	Julián Montoya	(substituted off) 50'
LP	1	Bruno Postiglioni	(substituted off) 57'
Replacements:
HK	16	Santiago Iglesias	(substituted on) 50'
PR	17	Lucas Noguera Paz	(substituted on) 57'
PR	18	Tetaz Chaparro	(substituted on) 46'
LK	19	Tomás Lavanini	(substituted on) 55'
N8	20	Antonio Ahualli de Chazal	(substituted on) 56'
SH	21	Martín Landajo	(substituted on) 57'
CE	22	Matías Moroni	(substituted on) 61'
FB	23	Joaquín Tuculet	(substituted on) 57'
Coach:
(Argentina) Daniel Hourcade

FB	15	Stuart Hogg
RW	14	Sean Maitland
OC	13	Nick De Luca
IC	12	Peter Horne	(substituted off) 64'
LW	11	Tommy Seymour
FH	10	Duncan Weir
SH	9	Grayson Hart	(substituted off) 47'
N8	8	Kieran Low
OF	7	Blair Cowan	(substituted off) 61'
BF	6	Rob Harley
RL	5	Grant Gilchrist (c)
LL	4	Jonny Gray	(substituted off) 55'
TP	3	Geoff Cross	(substituted off) 61'
HK	2	Ross Ford	(substituted off) 61'
LP	1	Alasdair Dickinson	(substituted off) 61'
Replacements:
HK	16	Pat MacArthur	(substituted on) 61'
PR	17	Gordon Reid	(substituted on) 61'
PR	18	Jon Welsh	(substituted on) 61'
LK	19	Tim Swinson	(substituted on) 55'
FL	20	Chris Fusaro	(substituted on) 61'
SH	21	Henry Pyrgos	(substituted on) 47'
FH	22	Tom Heathcote
WG	23	Dougie Fife	(substituted on) 64'
Coach:
(New Zealand) Vern Cotter

Touch judges:
Pascal Gaüzère (France)
Lourens van der Merwe (South Africa)
Television match official:
Deon van Bloomestein (South Africa)

Notes:

- Matías Moroni made his international debut for Argentina.

=== South Africa ===
28 June 2014
17:00 SAST (UTC+02)

South Africa	55–6	Scotland
Try: Coetzee (2) 3' c, 51' c Le Roux 10' c Mvovo (2) 16' m, 61' c Pietersen 56' m De Jager (2) 64' c, 78' c Con: Pollard (5/7) 4', 11', 52', 62', 65'; Boshoff 79'; Pen: Pollard (1/1) 44'	Report	Pen: Weir (2/2) 7', 36'

Nelson Mandela Bay Stadium, Port Elizabeth
Attendance: 40,973
Referee: Glen Jackson (New Zealand)

South Africa	Scotland

FB	15	Willie le Roux	21' to 27'		(substituted off) 75'
RW	14	Cornal Hendricks
OC	13	JP Pietersen
IC	12	Jan Serfontein
LW	11	Lwazi Mvovo
FH	10	Handré Pollard	(substituted off) 70'
SH	9	Fourie du Preez	(substituted off) 28'
N8	8	Duane Vermeulen	(substituted off) 66'
OF	7	Schalk Burger
BF	6	Marcell Coetzee
RL	5	Victor Matfield (c)	(substituted off) 70'
LL	4	Lood de Jager
TP	3	Jannie du Plessis	(substituted off) 70'
HK	2	Bismarck du Plessis	(substituted off) 54'
LP	1	Coenie Oosthuizen	(substituted off) 50'
Replacements:
HK	16	Adriaan Strauss	(substituted on) 54'
PR	17	Trevor Nyakane	(substituted on) 70'
PR	18	Marcel van der Merwe	(substituted on) 50'
LK	19	Stephan Lewies	(substituted on) 70'
FL	20	Oupa Mohojé	(substituted on) 66'
SH	21	Francois Hougaard	(substituted on) 29'
FH	22	Marnitz Boshoff	(substituted on) 70'
FB	23	Zane Kirchner	(substituted on) 21'	(substituted off) 27'	(substituted on) 75'
Coach:
(South Africa) Heyneke Meyer

FB	15	Stuart Hogg		(substituted off) 71'
RW	14	Sean Maitland		(substituted off) 53'
OC	13	Nick De Luca
IC	12	Peter Horne
LW	11	Tommy Seymour
FH	10	Duncan Weir
SH	9	Henry Pyrgos		(substituted off) 76'
N8	8	Adam Ashe
OF	7	Chris Fusaro		(substituted off) 49'
BF	6	Rob Harley
RL	5	Grant Gilchrist (c)
LL	4	Tim Swinson	(yellow card) 50' to 60'	(substituted off) 60'
TP	3	Geoff Cross		(substituted off) 50'
HK	2	Ross Ford		(substituted off) 60'
LP	1	Alasdair Dickinson		(substituted off) 79'
Replacements:
HK	16	Kevin Bryce		(substituted on) 60'
PR	17	Moray Low		(substituted on) 79'
PR	18	Euan Murray		(substituted on) 50'
LK	19	Jonny Gray		(substituted on) 60'
FL	20	Tyrone Holmes		(substituted on) 49'
SH	21	Grayson Hart		(substituted on) 76'
WG	22	Dougie Fife		(substituted on) 53'
FB	23	Peter Murchie		(substituted on) 71'
Coach:
(New Zealand) Vern Cotter

Man of the Match:
JP Pietersen (South Africa

Touch judges:
Romain Poite (France)
Marius Mitrea (Italy)
Television match official:
Glenn Newman (New Zealand)

Notes:

- Marnitz Boshoff, Stephan Lewies, Marcel van der Merwe, Oupa Mohojé and Handré Pollard made their international debuts for South Africa.
- Adam Ashe and Tyrone Holmes made their international debuts for Scotland.

== Statistics ==
Key

- Con: Conversions
- Pen: Penalties
- DG: Drop goals
- Pts: Points

=== Scotland Statistics ===
Name	Played	Tries	Con	Pen	DG	Pts	Temporarily suspended	Sent off (straight red)
Greig Laidlaw	2	0	4	4	0	20	–	–
Duncan Weir	2	0	1	5	0	17	–	–
Stuart Hogg	4	2	0	1	0	13	–	–
Grant Gilchrist	4	1	0	0	0	5	–	–
Henry Pyrgos	2	1	0	0	0	5	–	–
Tim Visser	2	1	0	0	0	5	–	–
Geoff Cross	4	0	0	0	0	0	–	–
Sean Maitland	4	0	0	0	0	0	–	–
Blair Cowan	3	0	0	0	0	0	–	–
Grayson Hart	3	0	0	0	0	0	–	–
Peter Horne	3	0	0	0	0	0	–	–
Kieran Low	3	0	0	0	0	0	–	–
Moray Low	3	0	0	0	0	0	–	–
Gordon Reid	3	0	0	0	0	0	–	–
Johnnie Beattie	2	0	0	0	0	0	–	–
Kevin Bryce	2	0	0	0	0	0	–	–
Alasdair Dickinson	2	0	0	0	0	0	–	–
Max Evans	2	0	0	0	0	0	–	–
Dougie Fife	2	0	0	0	0	0	–	–
Ross Ford	2	0	0	0	0	0	–	–
Chris Fusaro	2	0	0	0	0	0	–	–
Jonny Gray	2	0	0	0	0	0	–	–
Richie Gray	2	0	0	0	0	0	–	–
Rob Harley	2	0	0	0	0	0	–	–
Ruaridh Jackson	2	0	0	0	0	0	–	–
Sean Lamont	2	0	0	0	0	0	–	–
Scott Lawson	2	0	0	0	0	0	–	–
Nick De Luca	2	0	0	0	0	0	–	–
Pat MacArthur	2	0	0	0	0	0	–	–
Finn Russell	2	0	0	0	0	0	–	–
Tommy Seymour	2	0	0	0	0	0	–	–
Alasdair Strokosch	2	0	0	0	0	0	–	–
Tim Swinson	2	0	0	0	0	0	1	–
Alex Allan	1	0	0	0	0	0	–	–
Adam Ashe	1	0	0	0	0	0	–	–
Kelly Brown	1	0	0	0	0	0	–	–
Jim Hamilton	1	0	0	0	0	0	–	–
Tyrone Holmes	1	0	0	0	0	0	–	–
Peter Murchie	1	0	0	0	0	0	–	–
Euan Murray	1	0	0	0	0	0	–	–
Duncan Taylor	1	0	0	0	0	0	–	–
Jon Welsh	1	0	0	0	0	0	–	–
Mark Bennett	–	–	–	–	–	0	–	–
Chris Cusiter	–	–	–	–	–	0	–	–
David Denton	–	–	–	–	–	0	–	–
Alex Dunbar	–	–	–	–	–	0	–	–
Tom Heathcote	–	–	–	–	–	0	–	–
Kyle Traynor	–	–	–	–	–	0	–	–

=== Tour statistics ===
Name	Team	Tries	Con	Pen	DG	Pts
Greig Laidlaw	Scotland	0	4	4	0	20
Duncan Weir	Scotland	0	1	5	0	17
Stuart Hogg	Scotland	2	0	1	0	13
Handré Pollard	South Africa	0	5	1	0	13
James Pritchard	Canada	0	0	4	0	12
Marcell Coetzee	South Africa	2	0	0	0	10
Lood de Jager	South Africa	2	0	0	0	10
Lwazi Mvovo	South Africa	2	0	0	0	10
Nicolás Sánchez	Argentina	0	0	2	1	9
Chris Wyles	United States	0	0	2	0	6
Javier Ortega Desio	Argentina	1	0	0	0	5
Grant Gilchrist	Scotland	1	0	0	0	5
Jeff Hassler	Canada	1	0	0	0	5
JP Pietersen	South Africa	1	0	0	0	5
Henry Pyrgos	Scotland	1	0	0	0	5
Willie le Roux	South Africa	1	0	0	0	5
Joaquín Tuculet	Argentina	1	0	0	0	5
Tim Visser	Scotland	1	0	0	0	5
Penalty try	Scotland	1	0	0	0	5
Marnitz Boshoff	South Africa	0	1	0	0	2

== See also ==
- 2014 mid-year rugby union internationals
- Mid-year rugby union tests
- History of rugby union matches between Argentina and Scotland
- History of rugby union matches between Scotland and South Africa
