= Mark Bennett (rugby union, born 1993) =

Scotland international rugby union player

- Born: Mark Stewart Bennett; 3 February 1993 (age 33) Irvine, Scotland
- Height: 1.83 m (6 ft 0 in)
- Weight: 90 kg (14 st 2 lb; 198 lb)

Rugby union career
- Position: Centre
Senior career
Years	Team	Apps	(Points)
2010–2011	Glasgow Warriors	1	(0)
2011–2012	Clermont Auvergne	0	(0)
2012–2017	Glasgow Warriors	65	(110)
2017–2025	Edinburgh Rugby	112	(118)
2026–	Seattle Seawolves	0	(0)
- Correct as of 14 November 2025
International career
Years	Team	Apps	(Points)
2011–2013	Scotland U20	23	(45)
2014–2022	Scotland	29	(40)
2022	Scotland 'A'	1	(0)
- Correct as of 13 April 2023
National sevens teams
Years	Team		Comps
2013–2014	Scotland 7s		4 (55)
2016	GB 7s		1 (10)
Medal record
Men's rugby sevens
Representing Great Britain
Olympic Games
Silver medal – second place	2016 Rio de Janeiro	Team competition

17th Sir Willie Purves Quaich
- In office 2016–2016
- Preceded by: Finn Russell
- Succeeded by: Magnus Bradbury

Mark Stewart Bennett (born 3 February 1993) is a Scottish rugby union player who played for Edinburgh Rugby in the United Rugby Championship.

== Rugby union career ==
=== Amateur career ===
Bennett started his career playing for Cumnock in 2002 before moving to Ayr RFC and winning the Scottish Premiership in 2011.

=== Professional career ===
He also made his senior debut for Glasgow in 2011 and secured a move to French side ASM Clermont Auvergne. A serious knee injury disrupted his season, and he returned to Glasgow in 2012 to join the Warriors on loan with the move being made permanent in 2013.

On 14 February 2017, Edinburgh Rugby announced that they had signed him on a three-year deal and that he would begin playing for them from the summer.

Edinburgh Rugby did not renew his contract after the conclusion of the 2024-2025 season, with Bennett only playing around 80 minutes across the full season.

In November 2025, it was announced that Bennett had been signed by the Seattle Seawolves for the 2026 season.

=== International career ===
Bennett has represented Scotland at Under 18 level four times and played 21 times at under-20 level including appearances at the 2011, 2012 and 2013 IRB Junior World Championships.

Bennett was named in Vern Cotter's first ever squad for Scotland's 2014 summer tour, but failed to play in any of the four games. He was reselected in Scotland's squad for the 2014 Autumn Internationals, making his debut in Scotland's 41–31 victory over Argentina on 8 November 2014.

After establishing himself in the squad, Bennett played in all five of Scotland's matches in the 2015 Six Nations Championship, notching tries against Italy and England. He also had a potentially decisive try against Wales controversially disallowed, after team-mate Sam Hidalgo-Clyne was judged to have knocked-on when fouled near the try line.

After recovering from an injury which ruled him out of the run-in to Glasgow Warriors' 2014–15 Pro12 title triumph, Bennett was selected in Scotland's 31-man squad for the 2015 Rugby World Cup. He scored two tries in the team's opening match victory over Japan. Bennett was nominated for "Breakthrough Player of the Year" by World Rugby after the tournament. During the 2022 Six Nations Championship, Bennet was called up to the international squad and made his international return as a replacement in the loss to France at BT Murrayfield.

He represented Great Britain at the 2016 Summer Olympics where the team won silver after losing the gold medal match to Fiji.

==== International tries ====
As of 3 July 2022.

Try	Opposing Team	Venue	Competition	Date	Result	Score
1	Italy	Murrayfield Stadium, Edinburgh	2015 Six Nations	28 February 2015	Loss	19-22
2	England	Twickenham Stadium, London	2015 Six Nations	14 March 2015	Loss	25-13
3	Italy	Murrayfield Stadium, Edinburgh	2015 Rugby World Cup warm-ups	29 August 2015	Win	48-7
4	Japan	Kingsholm Stadium, Gloucester	2015 Rugby World Cup	23 September 2015	Win	10-45
5	Japan	Kingsholm Stadium, Gloucester	2015 Rugby World Cup	23 September 2015	Win	10-45
6	Australia	Twickenham Stadium, London	2015 Rugby World Cup	18 October 2015	Loss	35-34
7	Argentina	Estadio 23 de Agosto, Jujuy	2022 Summer Internationals	2 July 2022	Loss	26-18
8	Argentina	Estadio Padre Ernesto Martearena, Salta	2022 Summer Internationals	9 July 2022	Win	6-29
