= Finn Russell =

Scottish rugby union player (born 1992)

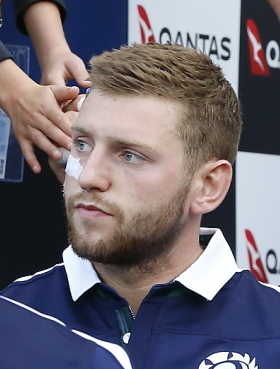
- Russell representing Scotland during the 2017 Summer Internationals
- Full name: Finn Alastair Russell
- Born: 23 September 1992 (age 34) Bridge of Allan, Stirling, Scotland
- Height: 1.82 m (6 ft 0 in)
- Weight: 87 kg (192 lb; 13 st 10 lb)
- School: Wallace High School
- University: Lincoln University

Rugby union career
- Position(s): Fly-half, Centre
- Current team: Bath
Senior career
Years	Team	Apps	(Points)
2013–2018	Glasgow Warriors	81	(596)
2018–2023	Racing 92	107	(470)
2023–	Bath	69	(657)
- Correct as of 31 October 2026
International career
Years	Team	Apps	(Points)
2012	Scotland U20	10	(10)
2014–	Scotland	97	(523)
2017, 2021, 2025	British & Irish Lions	4	(26)
- Correct as of 15 November 2026

Finn Alastair Russell (born 23 September 1992) is a Scottish professional rugby union player who plays as a fly-half for Premiership Rugby club Bath and often captains the Scotland national team.

Russell made his international debut against the United States in 2014, and has since played over eighty test matches. He has also represented the British & Irish Lions during their tours of New Zealand in 2017, South Africa in 2021 and Australia in 2025 playing in three tests. In 2024, Russell featured in the Netflix documentary Six Nations Full Contact.

Russell has been described as one of Scotland's greatest-ever players and among the best players in the world. Gregor Townsend praised him as “one of the most skilful players to ever play the game”, while Johann van Graan described him as “world-class” and “a genius [who] hits a target that nobody else can see”.

== Early life ==
Russell's father played a lot of racket sports, and worked in sports administration, including as Director of Domestic Rugby for the Scottish Rugby Union.

Russell started playing rugby in Wallace High School in Stirling. Russell did not feel drawn to academic work. After secondary school, he pursued an apprenticeship for three years as a stonemason, in a business owned by a family friend, whilst his rugby developed.

In 2013 Russell received the John Macphail Scholarship, linked with New Zealand's Lincoln University, spending 15 weeks in New Zealand's South Island playing for local clubs in the Christchurch area. He benefited from the facilities and specialist coaching offered by the Canterbury Rugby Football Union international high performance unit.

== Club career ==
=== Ayr ===
Russell initially played rugby at Stirling County, but in 2011 moved to second-flight Falkirk to improve his chances of first XV club rugby. Russell was selected to play for Ayr after the IRB Championship tournament, helping them win the league and cup double in the 2012–13 season of the Scottish Premiership. Russell joined Glasgow Warriors in 2012, but was injured in his first season.

=== Glasgow Warriors ===
Russell returned to Glasgow for the 2013/14 season. With Glasgow's top players away on international duty for the 2013 Six Nations Championship, Russell was named on the bench to face Zebre on 10 February 2013 as part of the 2012–13 Pro12 season, coming onto the field and making his professional debut at the 56th minute of the game. During the 2013–14 Pro12 season, Russell made his first start at the club, starting at Inside Centre against the Newport Gwent Dragons at Scotstoun Stadium on 22 November 2013. Glasgow head coach Gregor Townsend offered Russell a full-time contract with the club that began in the 2014–15 season.

2014–15 also saw Russell play a prominent role in Glasgow's Pro12 title triumph. In the final match of the regular season, he scored 22 points (including two tries) in a bonus-point victory over Ulster which was needed to secure a home play-off. The following week, against the same opposition, Russell's pass to D. T. H. van der Merwe in the 75th minute resulted in a try, tying the score at 14–14. Russell then scored the decisive conversion from a wide angle to send Glasgow into the final.

In the final at Belfast's Ravenhill Stadium, Russell scored a try and four conversions in a 31–13 victory over Munster, as Glasgow won their maiden title.

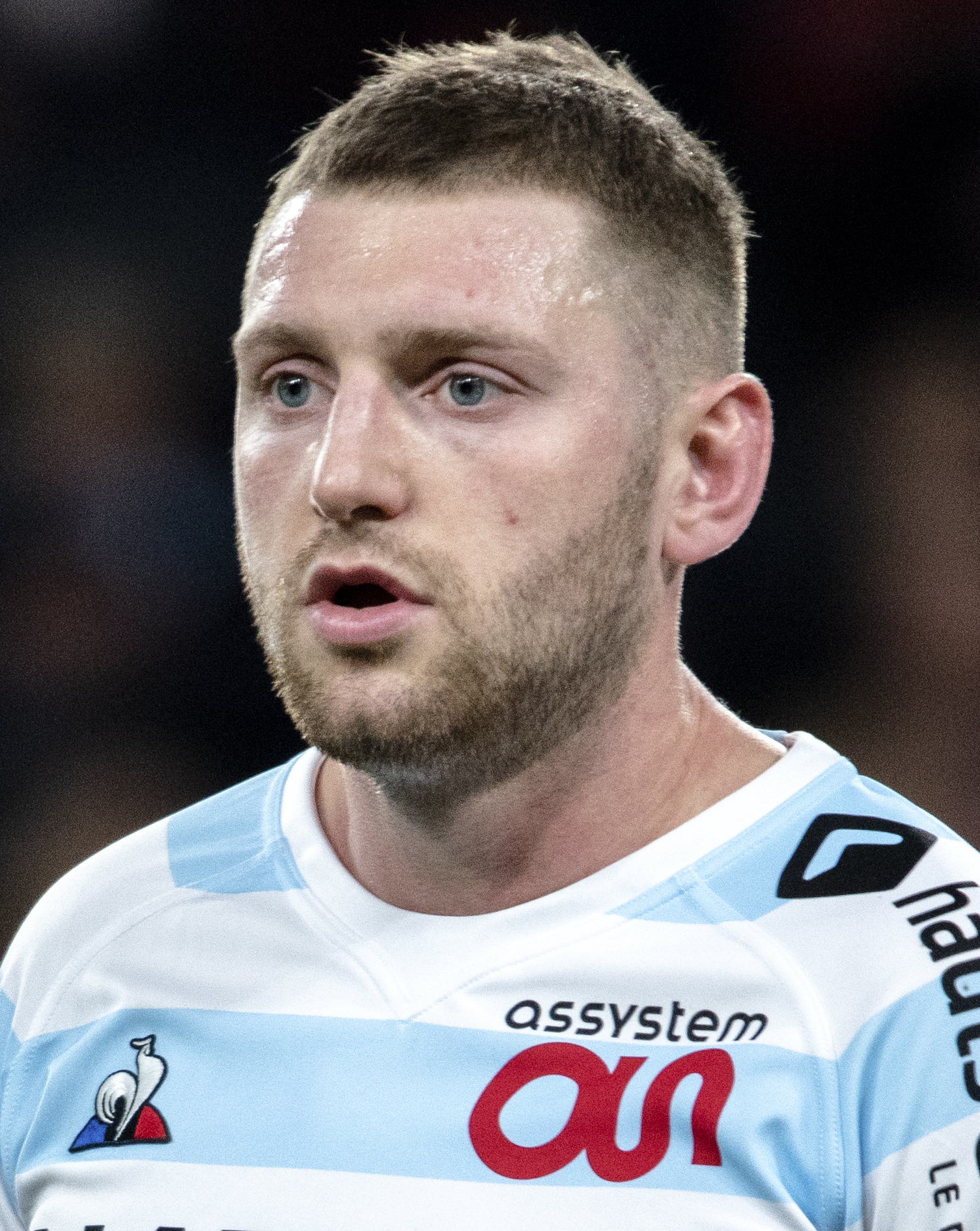
Russell playing for Racing 92 in 2020

=== Racing 92 ===
On 29 November 2017, it was announced that Russell would leave Glasgow Warriors at the end of the 2017–18 season to play for French club Racing 92, where he was to replace All Black Dan Carter who was moving to Japan.

In December 2022, it was announced that Russell would join Bath Rugby after the 2023 Rugby World Cup.

=== Bath ===
Following Scotland's early exit from the 2023 Rugby World Cup, Russell made his Bath debut as a substitute in the opening round of the 2023-24 Premiership Rugby season, contributing to Bath's 34–26 victory over Newcastle Falcons.

Russell sustained a groin injury during Bath's Investec Champions Cup defeat to Exeter Chiefs, taking him out of action for five weeks. He returned for the final two rounds of the regular season, playing a crucial role in helping Bath reach the playoffs for the first time in four years. In the semi-final against Sale Sharks, Russell scored 16 points, leading Bath to a 31–23 victory and securing their first Premiership Final appearance in nine years. However, Bath fell to Northampton Saints, losing the final 25–21.

He was instrumental in Bath's run to the final of the 2024–25 EPCR Challenge Cup, where they lifted the trophy after beating Lyon 37–12.

Russell won his second career league title in June 2025, scoring 13 points and setting up a try as Bath defeated Leicester Tigers in the 2024–25 Premiership Rugby Final.

On the 19th of June 2025, just five days after winning the 2024-25 Premiership Rugby Final, Bath Rugby announced Russell had signed a contract extension up until June 2028, adding another two years to his contract that had been due to run out in Summer 2026.

== International career ==
=== Scotland ===
In 2012, Russell played at centre for Scotland at the World Rugby U20 Championships. Russell earned his first call-up to the senior national team during Scotland's summer 2014 tour of North America, where he started in the matches against the United States and Canada. That autumn, he started in all three of Scotland's November Tests against Argentina, New Zealand and Tonga.

In 2014, Russell had what Scottish sportswriter Andy Newport called "a meteoric rise [that] saw the former Stirling County youngster blast his way into the national team in the space of six months."

Russell established himself as Scotland's first-choice Number 10 during the 2015 Six Nations Championship, starting four of the team's five matches. He missed the defeat to Italy through suspension, his sin-binning against Wales having been upgraded to a two-week ban following a citation (and unsuccessful appeal). Russell scored his first international try in the final day defeat to eventual champions Ireland.

Russell was selected in Scotland's 31-man squad for the 2015 Rugby World Cup, and scored a try in the team's opening match victory over Japan.

The summer of 2017 began with Russell as part of Scotland's Southern Hemisphere tour. He created two tries in the opening match win over Italy in Singapore, and followed this with a try of his own a week later during victory over Australia.

Russell played in all five of Scotland's 2018 Six Nations Championship fixtures. During the 25–13 victory over England, he threw a pass on his own 22-yard line as part of an attack leading to a try scored by Sean Maitland. This piece of skill was subsequently described by many pundits as being one of the greatest of all time.

Russell played in four of Scotland's 2019 Six Nations Championship fixtures, missing the match against France due to injury. He scored a try and two conversions and played pivotal role in Scotland's come back against England to earn a 38–38 draw.

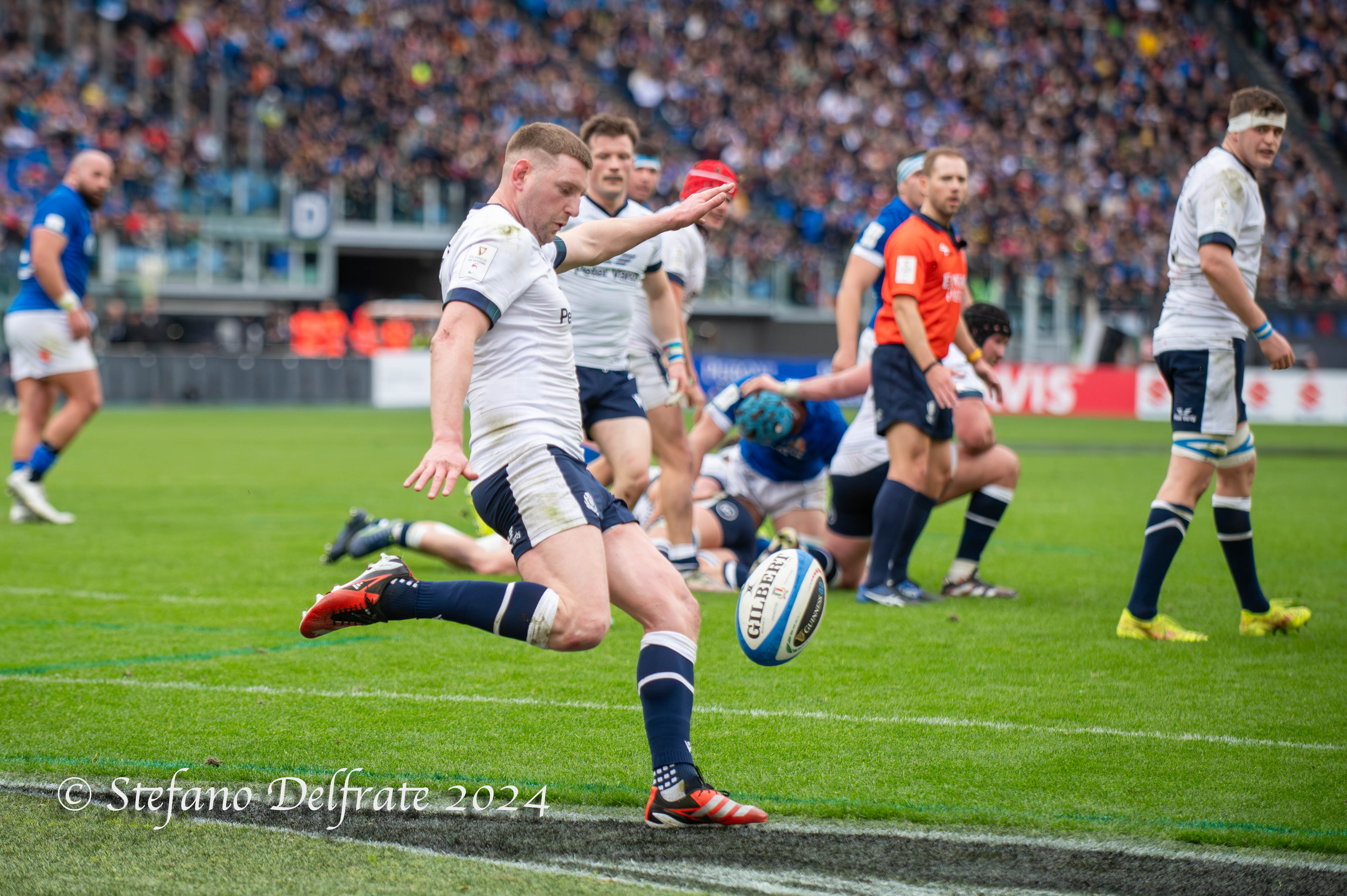
Russell in a Six Nations match against Italy in March 2024

Russell played in three of Scotland's group matches at the 2019 Rugby World Cup scoring a try in the loss to Japan, as Scotland failed to qualify to the quarter-finals.

In 2023, Russell was selected as one of two specialist stand offs, the other being Ben Healy, in Scotland's 33 player squad for the 2023 Rugby World Cup in France.

In 2024, Russell was named co-captain alongside Rory Darge for the 2024 Six Nations Championship.

=== British & Irish Lions ===
Following an instrumental man-of-the-match performance for Scotland against Australia in Sydney, Russell was called up as a replacement to the 2017 British & Irish Lions tour to New Zealand. He made a brief mid-week appearance during the 31–31 draw with Super Rugby champions Hurricanes as replacement for Dan Biggar who had sustained a head injury, becoming Lion number #835.

In 2021, Russell was selected in the 37-man squad for the Lions' tour to South Africa. His first Lions points came when he kicked four conversions in the 7–54 victory over the Sharks. Following an achilles tendon injury that kept him out of the first two Tests, he was selected on the bench for the decisive third Test match, coming on to the field after only 11 minutes to kick 11 points. Russell's performance was widely praised, with former England scrum half Matt Dawson stating, “if he was an All Black, you’d be saying he’s the next Dan Carter, he’s that good”.

In May 2025, Russell was selected for his third tour by Head Coach Andy Farrell, ahead of the 2025 British & Irish Lions tour to Australia. He was selected to start the first test and contributed three conversions and a penalty, a 100% kicking success rate, in the 19–27 victory. He again played the full 80 minutes second test, which the Lions won to secure a series victory. His field kicking played a notable part in the victory, with Ronan O'Gara subsequently describing his performance as 'exceptional'. He again played the full match in the final test, after which he was named as Howden's Player of the Series.

== Personal life ==
After leaving secondary school, Russell spent three years working as a stonemason, making windowsills, door frames, fireplaces, and building walls. In a 2015 interview he described the work as cold and often miserable but said he had enjoyed it, and that the experience still frames his outlook - on a bad day at training, he recalls "what it was like working in that cold shed."

Russell has been nicknamed 'Russell the Muscle' due to having a somewhat slender build for a modern-day rugby player, and has also been given the moniker 'White Chocolate' by teammate Simon Zebo.

Russell has been in a relationship with Emma Canning, a Scottish heptathlete, since 2017. In November 2022 Canning gave birth to the couple's first child, a daughter. The couple married in 2026.

== Career statistics ==
=== List of international tries ===
No.	Date	Venue	Opponent	Score	Result	Competition
1	21 March 2015	Murrayfield Stadium, Edinburgh, Scotland	Ireland	8–17	10–40	2015 Six Nations Championship
2	23 September 2015	Kingsholm Stadium, Gloucester, England	Japan	43–10	45–10	2015 Rugby World Cup
3	18 March 2017	Murrayfield Stadium, Edinburgh, Scotland	Italy	8–0	29–0	2017 Six Nations Championship
4	17 June 2017	Sydney Football Stadium, Sydney, Australia	Australia	17–7	24–19	2017 mid-year rugby union internationals
5	16 March 2019	Twickenham Stadium, London, England	England	29–31	38–38	2019 Six Nations Championship
6	13 October 2019	Nissan Stadium, Yokohama, Japan	Japan	5–0	21–28	2019 Rugby World Cup
7	14 March 2021	Murrayfield Stadium, Edinburgh, Scotland	Ireland	8–8	24–27	2021 Six Nations Championship
8	26 February 2023	Stade de France, Paris, France	France	17–7	21–32	2023 Six Nations Championship
9	24 November 2024	Murrayfield, Edinburgh, Scotland	Australia	27–6	27–13	2024 end-of-year rugby union internationals
10	21 February 2026	Millennium Stadium, Cardiff, Wales	Wales	20–10	23–26	2026 Six Nations Championship
11	14 March 2026	Aviva Stadium, Dublin, Ireland	Ireland	19-12	43–21	2026 Six Nations Championship

as of 14 March 2026

== Honours ==
Glasgow Warriors

- 2013-14 Pro12 - losing finalists
- 2014–15 Pro12

Racing 92

- 2019-20 European Rugby Champions Cup - losing finalists

Bath Rugby

- 2023-24 Premiership Rugby - losing finalists
- 2024–25 European Challenge Cup
- 2024–25 Premiership Rugby
- 2024–25 Premiership Rugby Cup

British & Irish Lions

- 2025 British & Irish Lions tour to Australia - series winners
- 2025 British & Irish Lions tour to Australia - Howden Player of the Series award winner

Awards and achievements
Previous: Jonny Gray and Gregor Hunter	John Macphail Scholarship; 2013	Next: Ewan McQuillin and Adam Ashe
Previous: Jonny Gray	Sir Willie Purves Quaich; 2015	Next: Mark Bennett
