= Andrea De Marchi (rugby union, born 1988) =

Italian rugby union player

- Born: 19 November 1988 (age 37) Montebelluna
- Height: 1.89 m (6 ft 2 in)
- Weight: 113 kg (17 st 11 lb; 249 lb)

Rugby union career
- Position: Prop
Youth career
- Treviso
Senior career
Years	Team	Apps	(Points)
2007−2008	Stade Montois	6	(0)
2008−2010	Rovigo Delta	46	(10)
2010−2012	Aironi	14	(0)
2012−2018	Zebre	109	(10)
2018−2020	I Medicei	31	(0)
- Correct as of 5 November 2017
International career
Years	Team	Apps	(Points)
2008	Italy Under 20	5	(0)
2009−2013	Emerging Italy	9	(0)
2014	Italy	2	(0)
- Correct as of 10 October 2017

Andrea De Marchi (Montebelluna, 19 November 1988) is a retired Italian rugby union player. His usual position was as a Prop, and he represented Italy on 2 occasions.

After the experience with Aironi, from 2012 to 2018, he played for Zebre.

In 2009, 2010 and 2013, De Marchi was named in the Italy A squad for the annual World Rugby Nations Cup, and he represented Italy on 2 occasions, in 2014.
