= Blair Cowan (rugby union) =

Scottish rugby union player

- Born: Blair Cowan; 21 April 1986 (age 40) Upper Hutt, Wellington
- Height: 1.88 m (6 ft 2 in)
- Weight: 108 kg (17 st 0 lb)
- Notable relative: Pekahou Cowan (cousin)

Rugby union career
- Position: Loose forward
Senior career
| Years | Team | Apps | (Points) |
- Upper Hutt
| 2009–2012 | Cornish Pirates | 53 | (110) |
| 2012–2013 | Worcester Warriors | 21 | (35) |
| 2013–2021 | London Irish | 153 | (130) |
| 2018 | →Saracens | 2 | (0) |
| 2022 | Black Rams Tokyo | 6 | (0) |
| 2023– | San Diego Legion | | |
- Correct as of 10 April 2023
International career
| Years | Team | Apps | (Points) |
| 2014–2020 | Scotland | 18 | (10) |
- Correct as of 13 February 2016

Blair Cowan (born 21 April 1986) is a Scottish rugby union player with Black Rams Tokyo. He also plays for the San Diego Legion of Major League Rugby (MLR) in the U.S. He plays as a number eight or flanker.

== Rugby Union career ==
=== Professional career ===
In 2013, he signed a three-year contract with London Irish. He was granted early release from his contract ahead of the 2021–22 season in order to pursue an opportunity in Japan.

=== International career ===
In October 2013, he was named in Scotland's Squad for Autumn Internationals. Although born in New Zealand, Cowan qualifies for Scotland duty through his Scottish-born mother, who was born in the village of Blairmore near Dunoon in Argyll. He eventually made his debut for Scotland during the 2014 summer tour of North America.
