= Kieran Low =

Scotland international rugby union player

- Full name: Kieran Low
- Born: 27 January 1991 (age 35) Chichester, West Sussex, England
- Height: 1.98 m (6 ft 6 in)
- Weight: 112 kg (17 st 9 lb; 247 lb)

Rugby union career
- Position: Lock / Loose forward
Amateur team(s)
Years	Team	Apps	(Points)
- Chichester Rugby Club
Senior career
Years	Team	Apps	(Points)
2009–2015	London Irish	61	(20)
2011	→ London Welsh	1	(0)
2015-16	Glasgow Warriors	3	((0))
2015-16	→ Saracens	1	((0))
- Correct as of 25 November 2014
International career
Years	Team	Apps	(Points)
2009	England U18		
2011	England U20		
2013	Scotland	5	(0)
- Correct as of 25 November 2014

Kieran Low (born 27 January 1991) is a retired Scottish international rugby union footballer who played either as a lock or loose forward. He spent most of his career at London Irish and had short spells at London Welsh, Glasgow Warriors and Saracens.

== Club career ==
Low was born in Chichester and started out playing for Chichester Rugby Club in his hometown before being spotted by London Irish. He was initially a member of the London Irish academy and had a short spell on loan at London Welsh before establishing himself firmly in the Exiles first team. He made more than 60 appearances for Irish.

Low moved to Scotland to join Glasgow Warriors for the 2015–16 season, but he did not settle and his playing time was limited by the mental and physical effects of repeated concussions.

Low joined Aviva Premiership champions Saracens 30 December 2015 on loan for the remainder of the 2015–16 season. He retired at the end of the season, aged 25, and has since worked as a painter and decorator.

== International career ==
Low represented England at under-18 and under-20 level but chose to play senior international rugby for Scotland, for whom he qualified through his Dingwall-born grandfather. He made his international debut on 23 November 2013 as a second-half substitute in Scotland's 21–15 defeat to Australia at Murrayfield.
