= Grayson Hart =

New Zealand rugby union player

- Born: Grayson J. Hart; 19 June 1988 (age 38) Kaitaia, New Zealand
- Height: 1.85 m (6 ft 1 in)
- Weight: 95 kg (14 st 13 lb)

Rugby union career
- Position(s): Scrum-half, Centre
- Current team: Bedford Blues
Amateur team(s)
Years	Team	Apps	(Points)
2011-13	Southern Districts		
2016–17	Gala rfc		
Senior career
Years	Team	Apps	(Points)
2013–2015	Edinburgh Rugby	24	(25)
2015–17	Glasgow Warriors	32	(5)
2017-2018	Ealing Trailfinders	14	(15)
2018-2019	London Scottish	25	(16)
2019-	Bedford Blues		
Provincial / State sides
Years	Team	Apps	(Points)
2007–2009	Auckland	25	(10)
2010	North Harbour	6	(0)
Super Rugby
Years	Team	Apps	(Points)
2008–2010	Blues	8	(0)
2012–2013	Waratahs	2	(0)
International career
Years	Team	Apps	(Points)
2008	New Zealand U20	5	(5)
2014	Scotland A	1	(0)
2014	Scotland	3	(0)
2015	Barbarian FC	1	(5)
2017	Scotland Sevens	21	(10)

Grayson Hart (born 19 June 1988 in Kaitaia, New Zealand) is a professional rugby union player for Bedford Blues. He previously played for Glasgow Warriors and Edinburgh Rugby in the Pro12 and the Blues and the NSW Waratahs in Super Rugby. Also Ealing Trailfinders and London Scottish in the RFU Championship. His usual position is Scrum-half.

== Early years ==
Hart grew up in the Auckland suburb of Mt Roskill where he excelled in many sports while attending Dilworth School. He then moved to Mt Roskill Grammar School for the last two years of secondary school. He was a member of Auckland representative rugby sides from under-14 through to under-16.

== Playing career ==
Known as a quick and skilled scrum-half with a great pass who isn't shy when it comes to the physical aspects of the game, Grayson Hart has played Super Rugby for the Blues and NSW Waratahs as well as NPC Rugby for Auckland and North Harbour. In the Northern Hemisphere he has played for Edinburgh Rugby and is currently a member of Glasgow Warriors and has been capped internationally by Scotland.

=== 2007 ===
Grayson made his debut for Auckland in the 2007 Air New Zealand Cup as a 19-year-old and made 13 appearances for a team that went undefeated during the season, won the Air New Zealand Cup and reclaimed the Ranfurly Shield from Canterbury.

=== 2008 ===
Hart was a key member of the New Zealand under-20 team which won the inaugural IRB Junior World Championship in 2008 in Wales, scoring a try against Ireland in the process. At the end of 2008 he played in an All Blacks practice match against the New Zealand Barbarians side. He would again suit up for Auckland in the Air New Zealand Cup where he shared time at scrum-half with Taniela Moa.

=== 2009 ===
Hart made his Super Rugby debut for the Blues against the Bulls in Round 2 of 2009, he then went on to play seven Super 14 matches that season. At 20 years old, he is the youngest scrum-half ever to play for the Blues at Super Rugby level. Again played for Auckland at ITM Cup level.

=== 2010 ===
He was again part of the Blues Wider Training Group but with the signing of more experienced players at the scrum-half position Grayson did not play in any Super Rugby matches. Hart spent the 2010 season on loan to North Harbour for the ITM Cup.

=== 2011 ===
With opportunities in New Zealand limited, Hart set off to Australia where he signed with Southern Districts Rugby Club in Sydney's Shute Shield competition and was immediately signed to the NSW Waratahs academy. He impressed the NSW coaching staff with his play for Souths and signed on for the 2012 Super Rugby season.

=== 2012 ===
In 2012 Hart trained with the Waratahs, as a member of the Extended Playing Group. He also played for Southern Districts in the Shute Shield, where his form at scrum-half helped convince Waratahs selectors him to partner with flyhalf with Bernard Foley. Hart made his debut for the Waratahs in the starting lineup in Round 20 against the Brumbies. Waratahs wing Drew Mitchell wrote a glowing column in the Herald Sun about Grayson's contribution. Following this performance Hart was retained as the starter for the Waratahs in the team's final game of the season against the playoff bound Reds. Hart held his own in the face of world class competition, in the form of scrum-half Will Genia.

Grayson remained a member of the Waratahs squad in 2013.

=== 2013–2015 ===
After another season at the Tahs, Hart moved to Edinburgh, in the Pro12 tournament along with team mate Oliver Atkins. He made his debut for Edinburgh in a RaboPro12 game against Ulster at Ravenhill on 22 November, coming on as a substitute and scoring a try in the process. Hart was rewarded with his first start for Edinburgh in a Heineken Cup match against Gloucester at Kingsholm Stadium and was at the forefront of a gallant Edinburgh effort, he played 80 minutes and led the team around the park remarkably for an upset win which revived their European campaign. Hart would go on to make 24 appearances for Edinburgh over the next two seasons, making 13 starts and scoring five tries.

=== 2015-2018 ===
In March 2015, Grayson Hart signed a two-year deal with Scottish rivals Glasgow Warriors, where he made the short trip down the M8 to compete for a starting place on Gregor Townsend's league leading squad.

Over two seasons with the Warriors, Grayson Hart made 32 appearances in the Pro12 and European Rugby Champions CUp, including 11 starts. When not in use for the Warriors, Hart played for the Glasgow Hawks in the Scottish Premiership.

In 2017, Hart joined the Ealing Trailfinders. He joined Aviva Premiership side Worcester Warriors for the final few weeks of the 2017-2018 season.

=== 2018- ===
London Scottish signed Hart in May 2018 and he will join the club for the 2018/19 season.

2019

Bedford Blues signed the scrum-half in March 2019 and will be heading to Goldington Road for the 2019/20 season

== International career ==
=== New Zealand Under 20 ===
Hart played for the New Zealand under-20 side in the 2008 IRB Junior World Championship where he kept current All Blacks scrum-half Aaron Smith on the bench throughout the tournament. Also part of the 2008 World Champion New Zealand under-20 side were current All Blacks, Zac Guildford, Sam Whitelock as well as Wallabies flyhalf Mike Harris.

=== Scotland ===
He is eligible to play internationally for Scotland through his maternal Grandmother who was born in Glasgow.

On the back of some strong club form Grayson Hart was selected for Scotland A to face England Saxons in January 2014.

Grayson Hart made his test debut for Scotland after coming on as a substitute in a win over Canada on 14 June at BMO Field in Toronto. He went on to make a total of three appearances for Scotland on their Summer Tour.

2017

Hart was selected to join the Scotland sevens team for the Hong Kong 7s and the Singapore 7s, he went on to become a key contributor in their march to the London Sevens title in 2017, setting up the match winning try in the quarterfinal upset against his birth country New Zealand.

== Honours ==
- 2007: Air New Zealand Cup winner with Auckland
- 2007: Ranfurly Shield winner with Auckland
- 2008: IRB Junior World Championship winner with New Zealand U20
- 2015: European Rugby Challenge Cup (Note: Formerly known as European Challenge Cup) Runners-up with Edinburgh
- 2016: 2017 London Sevens Cup Champions with Scotland national rugby sevens team
