= Antonio Ahualli de Chazal =

Argentine rugby union player (born 1987)

- Born: 6 September 1987 (age 39) Tucumán, Argentina
- Height: 6 ft 3 in (191 cm)
- Weight: 231 lb (105 kg)

Rugby union career
- Position: No. 8
International career
Years	Team	Apps	(Points)
2014	Argentina	4	(5)

Antonio Ahualli de Chazal (born 6 September 1987) is an Argentine former international rugby union player.

Born in Tucumán, Ahualli de Chazal is a nephew of Argentina prop Leopoldo de Chazal and elder brother of international flanker Lisandro Ahualli de Chazal. He got started in the sport as an eight-year-old and played his early rugby with Universitario in his native Tucumán, winning the Torneo del Noroeste three times.

Ahualli de Chazal moved to Buenos Aires to join San Isidro Club in the 2012–13 Top 14 season. It was from San Isidro Club that he gained his Pumas call up in 2014 and he won a total of four caps as a loose forward, including home internationals against Ireland and Scotland. He also played rugby sevens for Argentina.

In 2015, Ahualli de Chazal announced his retirement from rugby, at the age of 27.

== See also ==
- List of Argentina national rugby union players
