= Geoff Cross =

Scotland international rugby union player

- Born: Geoffrey Dominic Sebastian Cross; 11 December 1982 (age 43) Edinburgh, Scotland
- Height: 1.85 m (6 ft 1 in)
- Weight: 116 kg (256 lb; 18 st 4 lb)
- School: Galashiels Academy

Rugby union career
- Position: Tighthead Prop
Senior career
Years	Team	Apps	(Points)
2003–2006	Border Reivers	49	(15)
2006–2014	Edinburgh	162	(20)
2014	→ Glasgow	6	(5)
2014−2016	London Irish	14	(15)
2015	→ London Scottish	0	(0)
- Correct as of 24 January 2015
International career
Years	Team	Apps	(Points)
2009–14	Scotland	40	(10)
2008–2011	Scotland A	6	(0)
- Correct as of 21 March 2015

Geoffrey Dominic Sebastian Cross (born 11 December 1982) is a Scottish former rugby union player. He played as a tight-head prop for the Border Reivers, Edinburgh and London Irish. He won 40 caps for Scotland between 2009 and 2014. He is also a qualified doctor.

== Career ==
=== Club ===
Cross entered professional rugby when he joined Border Reivers in 2003 from Heriot's after having played for Scotland under-21 that year, including being at tight-head in the team who beat England 33–22 at Newbury in the final match of the age group's world championship.

In December 2006 Cross moved from the Border Reivers to Edinburgh on loan until the end of the season, and his debut for the capital city's team followed later that month in the Celtic League game against Glasgow Warriors at Hughenden. The move was made permanent after Cross's ten appearances during the 2006–07 season. He continued to play an increasingly prominent role in the Edinburgh set up and was called up to the Scotland squad for their tour of Argentina in 2008.

Cross continued to play at Edinburgh until midway through the 2013–14 season, when he was loaned to rivals Glasgow Warriors following an emergency request due to front-row injuries at the Warriors. The departure of Cross, a crowd favourite, to a league rival while Edinburgh were struggling for form and results was an unpopular move with the fans at Murrayfield.

Cross's loan to Warriors lasted to the end of the season where he signed for Aviva Premiership side London Irish once his contract with Edinburgh expired.

=== International ===
Cross was selected for the Scotland squad for the 2009 Six Nations Championship. His debut match against Wales ended prematurely when he was sin-binned for a tackle in the air on full-back Lee Byrne. Cross was carried off with horrific self-inflicted head injuries. Many people found this ironic as Cross is a qualified doctor. He did not play for the rest of Scotland's campaign. He has since returned for Edinburgh but was not included in new coach Andy Robinson's squad for the 2009 Autumn Tests. Despite being involved in the Scotland set up, including being selected for the victorious tour of Argentina in 2010, he did not add to his caps during the remainder of 2010.

Cross was once again called up for the 2011 Six Nations Championship, making appearances against England, Ireland and Italy, and has been regularly involved during Scotland's subsequent campaigns.

== Beard ==
For a period of over a year during 2014 and 2015, Cross grew a beard of epic magnitude. He was encouraged to cultivate during a loan spell at Glasgow Warriors by team-mate – and similarly bearded wonder – Josh Strauss:

I was at Glasgow for ten weeks last season and I talked to Josh Strauss, and he said, 'You know, Geoff, you say that after rugby you’re going to work as a medic, and I see you haven’t shaved for a few days – really I don’t think very many people would be happy if they went to a GP practice to talk about their sore back, looking to be reassured, and there was this man with this enormous beard. So really, this is the only time in your life that you’ve got to grow a beard. You should seize that opportunity.

The hirsute prop's face was eventually shaved by London Irish teammates on the last day of March 2015 (much to the delight of his wife, Helen), having raised over £10,000 for the Wooden Spoon charity.

== Retirement ==
Cross retired from professional rugby at the end of the 2015/16 season in order to take up his medical career.
