= Sean Maitland =

NZ Maori and Scotland international rugby union footballer

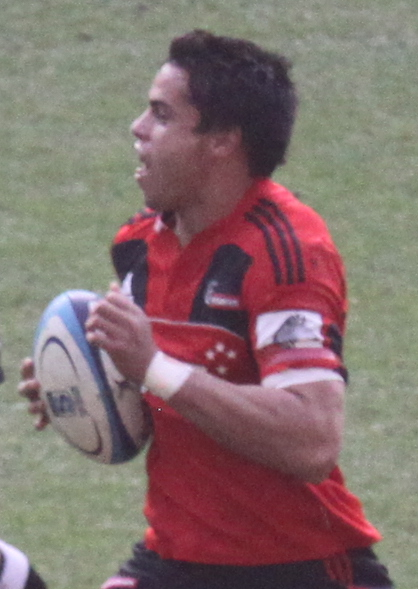
- Maitland representing the Crusaders during the 2011 Super Rugby season.
- Born: Sean Daniel Maitland; 14 September 1988 (age 38) Tokoroa, New Zealand
- Height: 1.85 m (6 ft 1 in)
- Weight: 101 kg (15 st 13 lb; 223 lb)
- School: Hamilton Boys High School
- Notable relative(s): Quade Cooper (cousin); Pele Cowley (cousin)

Rugby union career
- Position(s): Wing, Fullback
Senior career
Years	Team	Apps	(Points)
2006	Waikato	1	(0)
2007–2012	Canterbury	46	(95)
2008–2012	Crusaders	54	(115)
2012–2015	Glasgow	38	(50)
2015–2016	London Irish	18	(20)
2016–2024	Saracens	137	(260)
International career
Years	Team	Apps	(Points)
2008	New Zealand U20	4	(0)
2010	Māori All Blacks	3	(0)
2013–2021	Scotland	53	(75)
2013	British & Irish Lions		

Sean Daniel Maitland (born 14 September 1988) is a retired New Zealand-born Scottish rugby union player. He last played for Saracens in the Premiership Rugby. He previously played for London Irish and before that for Glasgow Warriors in the PRO12, Crusaders in Super Rugby and Canterbury in the Mitre 10 Cup. His regular playing positions were Wing and Full back.

== Early life ==
Maitland was born in Tokoroa, New Zealand, on 14 September 1988. He attended Hamilton Boys' High School where he played in the first XV and competed in athletics, recording a personal best of 11.29 and 22.30 seconds for the 100m and 200m respectively, and threw the discus 45.47m. Maitland is half-Scottish and is of Samoan and Maori descent from his mother's side. He is the cousin of New Zealand born, Australian rugby union player Quade Cooper. Maitland and cousin Cooper also grew up with future Kiwi Rugby League international Isaac John.

== Club career ==
Maitland spent 2005 and 2006 in the New Zealand Schools team and was a member of New Zealand under-19 World Cup winning side in 2007 and the New Zealand under-20 side in 2008 winning the IRB Junior World Championship. Sean scored four tries against teams from Argentina, Ireland and Wales. One of his teammates was John Hardie who he would go on to play with in the Scotland Rugby Team.

Maitland debuted for Canterbury in 2006, and made his Super Rugby debut for the Crusaders against the ACT Brumbies in 2008 and played in every Crusaders match that year. In 2010, he was selected for the New Zealand Maori where he impressed, scoring a try against Ireland. On 11 March 2011 he scored four tries in a game against the Brumbies, equaling the record for the most tries scored in a Super Rugby match. Maitland joined Glasgow Warriors in 2012, and won his first cap for Scotland at the start of the 2013 Six Nations Championship. After 3 years playing for Glasgow Warriors, Maitland moved to London Irish, and in 2016 to Saracens. During his time at Saracens he won three Premiership titles in 2018, 2019 and 2023, scoring a try in the 2019 final. He also helped Saracens win the European Champions Cup in 2019, scoring a try in the final. He had previously missed Saracens' victory in the 2017 European Champions Cup final through injury.

== International career ==
On 30 April 2013, Maitland was announced in the British and Irish Lions squad for the tour of Australia later that year. The tour marked a possible first encounter with cousin Quade Cooper in the test arena, having played one another before at Super Rugby level. The two never met in-game as Cooper was controversially left out of the extended Wallaby squad for the series, and Maitland never took to the field in the one test that he was on the bench. Maitland was not selected in the team to play the Queensland Reds mid-week game, in which Cooper captained the Reds for the first time. The two would go on to play against each other in November 2013, when Scotland lost to Australia in the end-of-year-internationals

Maitland played in the Rugby World Cup 2015, in which Scotland reached the quarter-finals. He was controversially sin binned for a supposed deliberate knock-on in the quarter-finals. Scotland eventually went on to lose the match 35–34, ending their Rugby World Cup.

== Personal life ==
Maitland qualifies for Scotland by his Glaswegian grandparents who emigrated to New Zealand in the 1960s. Maitland said "My granddad always reminded me that I was part Scottish and that I should never forget that."

On Maitland's maternal grandfather's side, Sean is also closely related to 'Smoking Joe' Stanley of New Zealand All Black fame in the mid 1980s–1990 on his Samoan side. In 2009, Maitland was a finalist in the Cleo New Zealand Bachelor of the Year competition.

In November 2013, Maitland and three other Scottish rugby players were charged with assault following an incident outside a Glasgow takeaway shop in August, although these were ultimately dropped and Maitland faced no further action.

In October 2020 Maitland was charged by the RFU for “conduct prejudicial to the interests of the Union” for breaking COVID-19 regulations whilst on duty with the Barbarians.

=== International tries ===
As of 15 March 2022.

Try	Opposing Team	Venue	Competition	Date	Result	Score
1	England	Twickenham Stadium, London	2013 Six Nations	2 February 2013	Loss	38-19
2	Argentina	Murrayfield Stadium, Edinburgh	2014 Autumn Internationals	8 November 2014	Win	41-31
3	United States	Elland Road, Leeds	2015 Rugby World Cup	27 September 2015	Win	39-16
4	Argentina	Murrayfield Stadium, Edinburgh	2016 Autumn Internationals	19 November 2016	Win	19-16
5	Georgia	Rugby Park, Kilmarnock	2016 Autumn Internationals	26 November 2016	Win	43-16
6	Australia	Murrayfield Stadium, Edinburgh	2017 Autumn Internationals	25 November 2017	Win	53-24
7	France	Murrayfield Stadium, Edinburgh	2018 Six Nations	11 February 2018	Win	32-26
8	England	Murrayfield Stadium, Edinburgh	2018 Six Nations	24 February 2018	Win	25-13
9	Italy	Stadio Olimpico, Rome	2018 Six Nations	17 March 2018	Win	27-29
10	Fiji	Murrayfield Stadium, Edinburgh	2018 Autumn Internationals	10 November 2018	Win	54-17
11	Argentina	Murrayfield Stadium, Edinburgh	2018 Autumn Internationals	24 November 2018	Win	14-9
12	France	Murrayfield Stadium, Edinburgh	2019 Rugby World Cup warm-up matches	24 August 2019	Win	17-14
13	Samoa	Kobe Misaki Stadium, Kobe	2019 Rugby World Cup	30 September 2019	Win	34-0
14	France	Murrayfield Stadium, Edinburgh	2020 Six Nations	8 March 2020	Win	28-17
15	France	Murrayfield Stadium, Edinburgh	2020 Six Nations	8 March 2020	Win	28-17
