= 2014–15 Edinburgh Rugby season =

- Ground(s): Murrayfield Stadium, Myerside
- CEO: (England) David Davies
- Coach: (South Africa) Alan Solomons
- Captain: Mike Coman
- Most caps: (South Africa) WP Nel (32)
- Top scorer: (Scotland) Sam Hidalgo-Clyne (175)
- Most tries: (Scotland) Tim Visser (9)
- League: Pro12
1st kit	2nd kit

The 2014–15 season was Edinburgh Rugby's fourteenth season competing in the Pro12.

== Team ==
=== Coaches ===
Alan Solomons will continue as head coach along with Stevie Scott as assistant coach.

=== Squad ===
Hookers (Scotland) Neil Cochrane (Scotland) Ross Ford (United States) James Hilterbrand (Scotland) Stuart McInally (Scotland) George Turner Props (Ireland) John Andress (New Zealand) Simon Berghan (South Africa) Allan Dell (Scotland) Alasdair Dickinson (Scotland) Grant Shiells (South Africa) WP Nel Locks (Scotland) Oliver Atkins (Namibia) Anton Bresler (Scotland) Grant Gilchrist (Scotland) Fraser McKenzie (Australia) Alex Toolis (Scotland) Ben Toolis	Loose forwards (New Zealand) Hugh Blake ^{TC} (New Zealand) Mike Coman (c) (Scotland) David Denton (South Africa) Cornell du Preez (Scotland) Roddy Grant (Argentina) Tomás Leonardi (Scotland) Jamie Ritchie (Scotland) Hamish Watson Half backs (England) Nathan Fowles (Scotland) Grayson Hart (Scotland) Sam Hidalgo-Clyne (Scotland) Sean Kennedy Stand offs (South Africa) Carl Bezuidenhout (Scotland) Tom Heathcote (Scotland) Greig Tonks (New Zealand) Jade Te Rure ^{TC}	Centres (New Zealand) Ben Atiga (New Zealand) Sam Beard (New Zealand) Phil Burleigh (Scotland) Chris Dean (Argentina) Joaquín Domínguez (Scotland) Matt Scott (South Africa) Andries Strauss Back Three (Scotland) Tom Brown (Scotland) Jack Cuthbert (Scotland) Jamie Farndale (Scotland) Dougie Fife (Scotland) Damien Hoyland (New Zealand) Nick McLennan (Scotland) Tim Visser

(c) Denotes team captain,
Italicised denotes Scottish qualified
^{TC} denotes players signed on a trial contract.

=== BT Sport Scottish Rugby Academy Stage 3 players ===
- Chris Auld - Centre
- Magnus Bradbury - Back row
- Hugh Fraser - Scrum half
- Alex Glashan - Scrum half
- Ruaridh Howarth - Full back
- Jake Kerr - Hooker
- Max McFarland - Wing/full-back
- Ewan McQuillin - Prop
- Ally Miller - Back row
- Ben Robbins - Wing
- Rory Sutherland - Prop
- Callum Sheldon - Prop

=== Transfers ===
==== Personnel In ====
- (Scotland) Neil Cochrane from (England) Wasps
- (Scotland) Damien Hoyland from (Scotland) Melrose RFC
- (South Africa) / (Scotland) Allan Dell from (South Africa) Sharks
- (New Zealand) / (Scotland) Nick McLennan from (New Zealand) Hawke's Bay
- (Scotland) Michael Tait from (England) Newcastle Falcons
- Chris Dean from Scotland 7s
- (Ireland) John Andress from Worcester Warriors
- (Scotland) Jamie Ritchie from Howe of Fife RFC
- (Scotland) Tom Heathcote from Bath
- (Scotland) Fraser McKenzie from Newcastle Falcons
- (New Zealand) Phil Burleigh from (New Zealand) Highlanders
- (Namibia) Anton Bresler from the (South Africa) Sharks
- (United States) Brett Thompson from (United States) USA 7s
- (Scotland) Grant Shiells from (England) Bath
- (New Zealand) Hugh Blake from (New Zealand) Otago trial contracts
- (New Zealand) Jade Te Rure from (New Zealand) Manawatutrial contracts
- (England) Nathan Fowles from Sale Sharks loan

==== Personnel Out ====
- (Scotland) Steven Lawrie retired
- (Scotland) Ben Cairns retired
- (Scotland) Greig Laidlaw to (England) Gloucester
- (South Africa) Izak van der Westhuizen to (South Africa) Eastern Province Kings
- (Scotland) Geoff Cross to (England) London Irish
- (England) Sean Cox to (England) London Irish
- (England) Piers Francis released
- (Scotland) Gregor Hunter released
- (Scotland) Harry Leonard to (England) Yorkshire Carnegie
- (Scotland) Nick De Luca to (France) Biarritz Olympique
- (Scotland) Robin Hislop to (England) Rotherham Titans
- (Scotland) Ross Rennie to (England) Bristol
- (Georgia (country)) Dimitri Basilaia
- (Scotland) Lee Jones
- (England) Perry Parker to (England) Rotherham Titans
- (England) Chris Leck
- (Scotland) Lewis Niven to Edinburgh Accies
- (Scotland) Alex Black
- (Scotland) Alun Walker
- (Scotland) Robert McAlpine
- (Tonga) Aleki Lutui to (England) Gloucester
- (Scotland) Michael Tait retired
- (South Africa) Omar Mouneimne
- (Scotland) Nikki Walker to Hawick RFC
- (Namibia) Wicus Blaauw released
- (United States) Brett Thompson released

== Sponsorship ==
- BT Sport
- Mitsubishi Cars

== Competitions ==
=== Player statistics ===
During the 2014–15 season, Edinburgh have used forty five different players in competitive games. The table below shows the number of appearances and points scored by each player.

As of 06 April 2015 (UTC)

Position	Nation	Name	Pro12			Challenge Cup			Total	
Position	Nation	Name	Apps (sub)	Points		Apps (sub)	Points		Apps (sub)	Total Pts
Position	Nation	Name	Apps (sub)	Try	Kick	Apps (sub)	Try	Kick	Apps (sub)	Total Pts
HK	(Scotland)	Ross Ford	13	1	0	7	1	0	20	10
HK	(Australia)	James Hilterbrand	3(5)	0	0	1(2)	0	0	4(9)	0
HK	(Scotland)	Neil Cochrane	4(9)	0	0	1(5)	1	0	5(12)	5
HK	(Scotland)	Stuart McInally	4(6)	2	0	2(4)	1	0	4(10)	15
HK	(Scotland)	George Turner	(1)	0	0	0	0	0	(1)	0
PR	(New Zealand)	Simon Berghan	(1)	0	0	0	0	0	(1)	0
PR	(South Africa)	Allan Dell	1(2)	0	0	1(1)	0	0	2(3)	0
PR	(Scotland)	Alasdair Dickinson	13	0	0	6	0	0	19	0
PR	(Ireland)	John Andress	9(10)	0	0	1(7)	0	0	10(17)	0
PR	(South Africa)	WP Nel	13(8)	1	0	8(1)	3	0	21(9)	20
PR	(Scotland)	Rory Sutherland	8(7)	0	0	2(5)	1	0	10(12)	5
PR	(Scotland)	Grant Shiells	(8)	0	0	(1)	0	0	(9)	0
LK	(Scotland)	Ollie Atkins	8(6)	0	0	1	0	0	9(6)	0
LK	(Namibia)	Anton Bresler	15(2)	0	0	8(1)	0	0	23(3)	0
LK	(Scotland)	Grant Gilchrist	2(1)	0	0	2	0	0	4(1)	0
LK	(Scotland)	Fraser McKenzie	6(10)	0	0	(6)	1	0	6(16)	5
LK	(Scotland)	Ben Toolis	14	0	0	7(1)	1	0	21(1)	5
LK	(New Zealand)	Jack Turley	1	0	0	0	0	0	1	0
BR	(New Zealand)	Hugh Blake	1(2)	0	0	0	0	0	1(2)	0
BR	(Scotland)	Magnus Bradbury	1	0	0	0	0	0	1	0
BR	(New Zealand)	Mike Coman	13(2)	1	0	7	0	0	20(2)	5
BR	(Scotland)	David Denton	11	3	0	3(1)	0	0	14(1)	15
BR	(Scotland)	Roddy Grant	12(4)	5	0	7(2)	1	0	19(6)	30
BR	(Argentina)	Tomás Leonardi	5(5)	1	0	4	0	0	9(5)	5
BR	(Scotland)	Jamie Ritchie	(1)	0	0	0	0	0	(1)	0
BR	(Scotland)	Hamish Watson	12(1)	3	0	4(2)	0	0	16(3)	15
BR	(South Africa)	Cornell du Preez	8(1)	1	0	1(1)	0	0	9(2)	5
SH	(England)	Nathan Fowles	1(5)	0	0	(1)	0	0	1(6)	0
SH	(Scotland)	Sean Kennedy	5	0	0	(3)	0	0	5(3)	0
SH	(Scotland)	Sam Hidalgo-Clyne	13(5)	1	86	8(1)	3	84	21(6)	188
SH	(Scotland)	Grayson Hart	3(6)	2	5	1(1)	0	0	4(7)	15
FH	(South Africa)	Carl Bezuidenhout	(1)	0	0	0	0	0	(1)	0
FH	(Scotland)	Tom Heathcote	11(7)	0	109	3(3)	0	33	14(10)	142
FH	(New Zealand)	Jade Te Rure	2	1	5	(2)	0	0	2(2)	10
FH	(Scotland)	Greig Tonks	10(2)	0	0	7(1)	0	2	17(3)	2
CE	(New Zealand)	Sam Beard	12(3)	0	0	4(3)	0	0	16(6)	0
CE	(New Zealand)	Phil Burleigh	12(4)	3	0	7	0	0	19(4)	15
CE	(Argentina)	Joaquín Domínguez	1(2)	0	0	(1)	0	0	1(3)	0
CE	(Scotland)	Matt Scott	6	2	0	4	1	0	10	15
CE	(South Africa)	Andries Strauss	17(2)	2	0	6(2)	0	0	23(4)	10
WG	(Scotland)	Tom Brown	5(2)	2	0	1(3)	0	0	6(5)	10
WG	(Scotland)	Dougie Fife	16	3	0	7	4	0	23	35
WG	(Scotland)	Damien Hoyland	1	0	0	0	0	0	1	0
WG	(Scotland)	Tim Visser	18	6	0	9	3	0	27	45
FB	(Scotland)	Jack Cuthbert	16(1)	1	0	4	1	0	20(1)	10
FB	(New Zealand)	Nick McLennan	6(2)	0	0	2(2)	0	3	9(4)	3

=== Preseason ===
==== Match 1 ====
23 August 2014
14:00

Edinburgh (Scotland)	10–11	(England) Leicester Tigers
Try: Roddy Grant (m); Pen: Greig Tonks, Tom Heathcote	Report	Try: Logovi'i Mulipola (m); Pen: Freddie Burns, David Mélé

The Greenyards, Melrose
Attendance: n/a
Referee: Andrew McMenemy

==== Match 2 ====
29 August 2014
19:45

Newcastle Falcons (England)	15 - 21	(Scotland) Edinburgh
Try: Mike Blair, Scott Wilson; Con: Juan Pablo Socino (1/2); Pen: Juan Pablo Socino	Report	Try: Tim Visser (m), Tim Visser; Con: Greig Tonks (1/2); Pen: Greig Tonks (2/3), Tom Heathcote

Mansfield Park, Hawick
Attendance: n/a
Referee: n/a

=== Pro12 ===
==== League table ====
Pro12 Table
	Team	Played	Won	Drawn	Lost	Points For	Points Against	Points Difference	Tries For	Tries Against	Try Bonus	Losing Bonus	Points
1	(Scotland) Glasgow Warriors (CH)	22	16	1	5	540	360	+180	63	33	9	0	75
2	(Ireland) Munster (RU)	22	15	2	5	581	367	+214	68	31	8	3	75
3	(Wales) Ospreys (SF)	22	16	1	5	546	358	+188	53	30	6	2	74
4	(Ireland) Ulster (SF)	22	14	2	6	524	372	+152	59	34	6	3	69
5	(Ireland) Leinster	22	11	3	8	483	375	+108	54	39	8	4	62
6	(Wales) Scarlets	22	11	3	8	452	388	+64	43	39	4	3	57
7	(Ireland) Connacht	22	10	1	11	447	419	+28	49	48	3	5	50
8	(Scotland) Edinburgh	22	10	1	11	399	419	−20	41	48	3	3	48
9	(Wales) Newport Gwent Dragons	22	8	0	14	393	484	−91	38	55	4	6	42
10	(Wales) Cardiff Blues	22	7	1	14	430	545	−115	46	57	3	2	35
11	(Italy) Benetton Treviso	22	3	1	18	306	641	−335	34	81	2	3	19
12	(Italy) Zebre	22	3	0	19	266	639	−373	27	80	0	3	15
If teams are level at any stage, tiebreakers are applied in the following order: 1. number of matches won; 2. the difference between points for and points against; 3. the number of tries scored; 4. the most points scored; 5. the difference between tries for and tries against; 6. the fewest red cards received; 7. the fewest yellow cards received.
Green background (rows 1 to 4) are play-off places, and earn a place in the 2015–16 European Rugby Champions Cup. Blue background indicates teams outside the play-off places, that earn a place in the European Rugby Champions Cup. The top team from each country will qualify. Yellow background indicates the team that advances to a play-off semi-final against Aviva Premiership side Gloucester, who qualified for the play-off as the 2014–15 European Rugby Challenge Cup winners. Plain background indicates teams that earn a place in the 2015–16 European Rugby Challenge Cup.

==== Results ====
===== Round 1 =====
5 September 2014
19:35

(1 BP) Munster (Ireland)	13–14	(Scotland) Edinburgh
Try: Stander (2) 35' m, 59' m Pen: Keatley (1/2) 69'	Report	Try: Cuthbert 47' m Pen: Heathcote (3/5) 3', 8', 40'

Thomond Park
Attendance: 13,428
Referee: Leighton Hodges (WRU)

===== Round 2 =====
12 September 2014
19:35

(1 BP) Edinburgh (Scotland)	13–14	(Ireland) Connacht
Try: du Preez 40' c Con: Heathcote (1/1); Pen: Heathcote (2/3) 3', 9'	Report	Try: Faloon 75' m Pen: Leader (3/5) 23', 37', 55'

Murrayfield Stadium
Attendance: 3,777
Referee: Gary Conway (IRFU)

===== Round 3 =====
21 September 2014
16:00

(1 BP) Ospreys (Wales)	62–13	(Scotland) Edinburgh
Try: Webb (2) 1' c, 11' c Baker 32' c Biggar 45' c Hassler 49' m Spratt 61' m Dirksen 69' c Grabham 72' c Ardron 76' c Con: Biggar (4/6); Davies (3/3); Pen: Biggar (1/1) 40'	Report	Try: Watson 36' c Con: Heathcote (1/1); Pen: Heathcote (2/2) 8', 43'

Liberty Stadium
Attendance: 6,340
Referee: Peter Fitzgibbon (IRFU)

===== Round 4 =====
26 September 2014
19:35

Edinburgh (Scotland)	20–20	(Wales) Scarlets
Try: Visser 35' c Burleigh 72' c Con: Heathcote (2/2); Pen: Heathcote (2/3) 8', 50'	Report	Try: Robinson 1' c Li. Williams 31' c Con: Priestland (2/2); Pen: Priestland (2/3) 11', 44'

Murrayfield Stadium
Attendance: 3,328
Referee: John Lacey (IRFU)

===== Round 5 =====
3 October 2014
19:35

(1 BP) Ulster (Ireland)	30–0	(Scotland) Edinburgh
Try: Trimble (2) 25' c, 78' m Williams 61' m Best 68' c Con: Jackson (1/1); Olding (1/3); Pen: Jackson (2/3) 13', 39'	Report

Kingspan Stadium
Attendance: 15,479
Referee: Claudio Blessano (FIR)

===== Round 6 =====
11 October 2014
14:40

Edinburgh (Scotland)	24–10	(Wales) Newport Gwent Dragons
Try: Visser 47' c Fife 55' m Con: Heathcote (1/2); Pen: Heathcote (4/4) 33', 37', 46', 63'	Report	Try: Pewtner 43' c Con: Tovey (1/1); Pen: O'Brien (1/2) 60'

Murrayfield Stadium
Attendance: 3,156
Referee: Dudley Phillips (IRFU)

===== Round 7 =====
31 October 2014
19:35

(1 BP) Leinster (Ireland)	33–8	(Scotland) Edinburgh
Try: Ryan (2) 3' m, 52' c Conan 12' c Marshall 63' c M. McGrath 79' c Con: Gopperth (4/5)	Report	Try: Leonardi 75' m Pen: Heathcote (1/3) 23'

RDS Arena
Attendance: 15,077
Referee: Nigel Owens (WRU)

===== Round 8 =====
23 November 2014
16:00

Edinburgh (Scotland)	28–13	(Wales) Cardiff Blues
Try: Strauss 7' c Fife 46' c Brown 57' m Con: Heathcote (2/3); Pen: Heathcote (3/4) 15', 24', 36'	Report	Try: A. Thomas 73' c Con: G. Davies (1/1); Pen: G. Davies (2/3) 12', 38'

Murrayfield Stadium
Attendance: 3,803
Referee: Leo Colgan (IRFU)

===== Round 9 =====
29 November 2014
16:00

Zebre (Italy)	18–10	(Scotland) Edinburgh
Try: Bisegni 62' c Visentin 70' m Con: Haimona (1/2); Pen: Haimona (2/4) 10', 53'	Report	Try: Grant 38' c Con: Heathcote (1/1); Pen: Heathcote (1/2) 44'

Stadio XXV Aprile
Attendance: 2,583
Referee: David Wilkinson (IRFU)

===== Round 10 =====
19 December 2014
19:35

(1 BP) Edinburgh (Scotland)	48–0	(Italy) Benetton Treviso
Try: Hidalgo-Clyne 1' c Coman 24' c Nel 59' c Hart 62' c Grant 70' c Denton 80' c Con: Hidalgo-Clyne (3/3); Heathcote (3/3); Pen: Hidalgo-Clyne (2/3) 16', 50'	Report

Murrayfield Stadium
Attendance: 2,768
Referee: David Wilkinson (IRFU)

===== Round 11 (1872 Cup - 16-6 agg.) =====
27 December 2014
14:40

Glasgow Warriors (Scotland)	16–6	(Scotland) Edinburgh
Try: Strauss 36' c Con: Weir (1/1); Pen: Weir (3/4) 15', 34', 69'	Report	Pen: Hidalgo-Clyne (1/1) 5'; Heathcote (1/1) 52'

Scotstoun Stadium
Attendance: 6,945
Referee: George Clancy (IRFU)

===== Round 12 (1872 Cup - 26-24 agg.) =====
2 January 2015
19:35

Edinburgh (1872 winner) (Scotland)	20–8	(Scotland) Glasgow Warriors
Try: Visser (2) 28' c, 32' c Con: Hidalgo-Clyne (2/2); Pen: Hidalgo-Clyne (2/4) 17', 25'	Report	Try: Matawalu 41' m Pen: Russell (1/1) 10'

Murrayfield Stadium
Attendance: 15,810
Referee: Nigel Owens (WRU)

===== Round 13 =====
9 January 2015
19:35

(1 BP) Connacht (Ireland)	13–16	(Scotland) Edinburgh
Try: penalty try 37' c Con: Nikora (1/1); Pen: Nikora (2/3) 23', 40'	Report	Try: Denton 16' c Con: Hidalgo-Clyne (1/1); Pen: Hidalgo-Clyne (3/4) 44', 49', 70'

Galway Sportsgrounds
Attendance: 5,267
Referee: Leighton Hodges (WRU)

===== Round 14 =====
13 February 2015
20:05

Edinburgh (Scotland)	24–16	(Wales) Ospreys
Try: Te Rure 18' c Brown 62' c Hart 77' c Con: Te Rure (1/1); Heathcote (2/2); Pen: Te Rure (1/3) 40'	Report	Try: D. Evans 80' c Con: Davies (1/1); Pen: Davies (3/4) 15', 26', 35'

Myreside
Attendance: 2,891
Referee: Gary Conway (IRFU)

===== Round 15 =====
20 February 2015
19:35

(1 BP) Edinburgh (Scotland)	17–20	(Ireland) Ulster
Try: Burleigh 8' m Pen: Heathcote (4/9) 18', 29', 36', 64'	Report	Try: Pienaar 13' c Cave 51' c Con: Pienaar (2/2); Pen: Pienaar (2/2) 34', 48'

Murrayfield Stadium
Attendance: 4,797
Referee: Leighton Hodges (WRU)

===== Round 16 =====
1 March 2015
12:45

Cardiff Blues (Wales)	21–15	(Scotland) Edinburgh (1 BP)
Try: L. Williams 17' c E. Jenkins 39' c Patchell 63' c Con: Patchell (3/3)	Report	Try: Visser 54' c Grant 69' m Con: Heathcote (1/1); Pen: Heathcote (1/1) 44'

BT Sport Cardiff Arms Park
Attendance: 5,740
Referee: Dudley Phillips (IRFU)

===== Round 17 =====
7 March 2015
19:00

Benetton Treviso (Italy)	8–29	(Scotland) Edinburgh (1 BP)
Try: Ragusi 69' m Pen: Hayward (1/2) 33'	Report	Try: Watson 17' c Scott (2) 19' c, 73' c Strauss 59' m Con: Hidalgo-Clyne (3/4); Pen: Hidalgo-Clyne (1/1) 35'

Stadio Comunale di Monigo
Attendance: 3,018
Referee: Nigel Owens (WRU)

===== Round 18 =====
28 March 2015
14:40

Scarlets (Wales)	15–26	(Scotland) Edinburgh
Pen: S. Shingler (5/5) 1', 11', 18', 22', 25'	Report	Try: Burleigh 8' c Denton 38' c Con: Hidalgo-Clyne (2/2); Pen: Hidalgo-Clyne (4/4) 33', 60', 73', 78'

Parc y Scarlets
Attendance: 7,310
Referee: John Lacey (IRFU)

===== Round 19 =====
11 April 2015
19:30

Edinburgh (Scotland)	3–34	(Ireland) Munster (1 BP)
Pen: Heathcote (1/1) 3'	Report	Try: Casey 32' c Stander 52' m Murray 56' c Zebo 62' m Earls 64' c Con: Keatley (3/5); Pen: Keatley (1/1) 19'

Murrayfield Stadium
Attendance: 4,818
Referee: Ian Davies (WRU)

===== Round 20 =====
24 April 2015
19:35

(1 BP) Edinburgh (Scotland)	37–0	(Italy) Zebre
Try: Grant (2) 7' c, 54' c Fife 25' c Ford 50' m McInally 79' m Con: Hidalgo-Clyne (3/4); Pen: Hidalgo-Clyne (2/2) 19', 31'	Report

Murrayfield Stadium
Attendance: 3,490
Referee: Leighton Hodges (WRU)

===== Round 21 =====
8 May 2015
19:30

Newport Gwent Dragons (Wales)	19–5	(Scotland) Edinburgh
Try: Gustafson 49' c Con: Tovey (1/1); Pen: Tovey (3/4) 4', 37', 78'; Prydie (1/1) 40'	Report	Try: McInally 76' m

Rodney Parade
Attendance: 5,608
Referee: Gary Conway (IRFU)

===== Round 22 =====
16 May 2015
15:00

Edinburgh (Scotland)	23–36	(Ireland) Leinster (1 BP)
Try: Watson 27' c Visser 55' c Con: Hidalgo-Clyne (2/2); Pen: Hidalgo-Clyne (3/4) 7', 44', 65'	Report	Try: Reid 17' c Conan 31' c Kirchner 51' m Murphy 71' c L. McGrath 77' c Con: Madigan (4/5); Drop: Madigan (1/1) 15'

Murrayfield Stadium
Attendance: 4,643
Referee: Nigel Owens (WRU)

=== Europe ===
==== Table ====
Pos	Team	Pld	W	D	L	PF	PA	PD	TF	TA	TB	LB	Pts
1	(Scotland) Edinburgh (5)	6	5	0	1	146	90	+56	14	8	1	1	22
2	(France) Lyon	6	4	0	2	149	139	+10	17	15	2	0	18
3	(France) Bordeaux Bègles	6	3	0	3	176	142	+34	22	14	3	1	16
4	(England) London Welsh	6	0	0	6	72	172	−100	7	23	0	1	1

Source: espn.co.uk

==== Results ====
===== Round 1 =====
17 October 2014
19:35

Bordeaux-Begles (France)	13–15	(Scotland) Edinburgh
Try: Serin 49' c Con: Beauxis 50'; Pen: Beauxis 32', 58'	Report	Try: Fife 45' m, Penalty try 72' c Con: Heathcote 73'; Pen: McLennan 70'

Stade Andre Moga
Attendance: 6,658
Referee: Neil Hennessy (WRU)

===== Round 2 =====
24 October 2014
19:45

Edinburgh (Scotland)	25-17	(France) Lyon
Try: Cuthbert c Con: Heathcote; Pen: Heathcote x 6	Report	Try: Matadigo, Tison; Con: Porical, Loree; Pen: Porical

Murrayfield Stadium
Attendance: 4,651
Referee: Matthew Carley (RFU)

===== Round 3 =====
7 December 2014
14:00

Edinburgh (Scotland)	25-13	(England) London Welsh
Try: Nel, Cochrane 67' c, Sutherland 71' c Con: Heathcote 67', Hidalgo-Clyne 71'; Pen: Heathcote (2', 22')	Report	Try: Elder 16' c Con: Ross (16'); Pen: Ross (10', 29')

Murrayfield Stadium
Attendance: 3,213
Referee: Cedric Marchat (FFR)

===== Round 4 =====
14 December 2014
14:30

London Welsh (England)	6-24	(Scotland) Edinburgh
Pen: Elder x2	Report	Try: Fife, Grant; Con: Tonks; Pen: Hidalgo-Clyne x 4

Kassam Stadium, Oxford
Attendance: 3,258
Referee: Alex Ruiz (FFR)

===== Round 5 =====
17 January 2015
20:45

Lyon (France)	21 - 19	(Scotland) Edinburgh (1 BP)
Try: Loursac 37' c, Fitzpatrick 51'; Con: Munro 39'; Pen: Munro 18', Porical 66'; Drop: Estebanez 75'	Report	Try: Visser 7', Fife 25'; Pen: Hidalgo-Clyne 4', 50', 69'

Matmut Stadium
Attendance: 10,000
Referee: Neil Hennessy (WRU)

===== Round 6 =====
23 January 2015
19:45

Edinburgh (1 BP) (Scotland)	38 - 20	(France) Bordeaux Begles
Try: Hidalgo-Clyne 37' c, Scott 50' c, Nel 56' c, Hidalgo-Clyne 65' c Con: Hidalgo-Clyne 51', 57', 66'; Pen: Hidalgo-Clyne 6', 31', 36', 42'	Report	Try: Serin 54' c, Bernard 75' c Con: Bernard 54', 75'; Pen: Beauxis 23', 33'

Murrayfield Stadium
Attendance: 4,817
Referee: Ian Davies (WRU)

==== Knock-out stage ====
===== Quarter finals =====
5 April 2015
17:45

London Irish (England)	18–23	(Scotland) Edinburgh
Try: Gilsenan 40' c Steele 52' m Con: Geraghty (1/2) 40'; Pen: Geraghty (2/4) 32', 45'	Report	Try: Nel 10' c McKenzie 59' c Con: Hidalgo-Clyne (2/2) 11', 61'; Pen: Hidalgo-Clyne (3/3) 1', 18', 20'

Madejski Stadium
Attendance: 4,728
Referee: Pascal Gaüzère (FFR)

===== Semi finals =====
18 April 2015
19:45

Edinburgh (Scotland)	45–16	(Wales) Dragons
Try: McInally 14', Visser 22', Toolis 54', Hidalgo-Clyne 60', Fife 67'; Con: Hidalgo-Clyne (4/5) 16', 56', 61', 69'; Pen: Hidalgo-Clyne 10', 33', 40', 58'	Report	Try: Harris 43'; Con: Jones 44'; Pen: Jones 3', 18', 30'

Murrayfield Stadium
Attendance: 8,231
Referee: JP Doyle (RFU)

===== Finals =====
1 May 2015
19:45

Edinburgh (Scotland)	13-19	(England) Gloucester
Try: Ford 65'; Con: Hidalgo-Clyne 65'; Pen: Hidalgo-Clyne 2', 35'	Report	Try: Twelvetrees 10'; Con: Laidlaw 11'; Pen: Laidlaw 8', 36', 49', 53'

Twickenham Stoop
Attendance: 14,316
Referee: Jerome Garces (FFR)
