= 2015–16 Edinburgh Rugby season =

- Ground(s): Murrayfield Stadium, Meggetland
- CEO: (Scotland) Jon Petrie
- Coach: (South Africa) Alan Solomons
- Captain: (New Zealand) Mike Coman
- League: Pro 12
| 1st kit | 2nd kit |

== Team ==
=== Coaches ===
Alan Solomons signed a contract extension to stay on as head coach for another year. He'll again be assisted by Stevie Scott.

Joining the coaching team former Scotland stand-off Duncan Hodge who joined from the Scotland national team. Also joining in the summer was former All Black, Australia and Crusaders strength and conditioning coach Ash Jones. He also worked with the Scotland national squad in preparation for Rugby World Cup 2015. Englishman Peter Wilkins joined as defence coach from Queensland Reds.

Coaches

- Alan Solomons (Head coach)
- Stevie Scott (Forwards coach)
- Duncan Hodge (Backs coach)
- Ash Jones (Head of S&C)
- Peter Wilkins (Defence coach)

Other coaches

- Marc Keys (Assistant S&C Coach)
- Ben Atiga (Player and Skills Coach)
- Murray Fleming (Lead performance analyst)
- Paul Larter (Performance analyst)

=== Squad ===
| Hookers (Scotland) Neil Cochrane (Scotland) Ross Ford (United States) James Hilterbrand ^{WCC} (Scotland) Stuart McInally (Scotland) George Turner Props (Ireland) John Andress (Poland) Craig Bachurzewsk ^{WCC} (New Zealand) Simon Berghan (Scotland) Jack Cosgrove ^{SRA} (South Africa) Allan Dell (Scotland) Alasdair Dickinson (Scotland) Grant Shiells (Scotland) Rory Sutherland (Scotland) WP Nel Locks (Namibia) Anton Bresler (Scotland) Grant Gilchrist (Scotland) Fraser McKenzie (Australia) Alex Toolis (Scotland) Ben Toolis | Loose forwards (Scotland) Magnus Bradbury (New Zealand) Mike Coman (c) (Scotland) David Denton (South Africa) Cornell du Preez (Scotland) Roddy Grant (Scotland) John Hardie (New Zealand) Nasi Manu (Scotland) Jamie Ritchie (Scotland) Hamish Watson Half backs (England) Nathan Fowles (Scotland) Sam Hidalgo-Clyne (Scotland) Sean Kennedy (Scotland) Murdo McAndrew ^{WCC} Stand offs (Scotland) Blair Kinghorn (Scotland) Greig Tonks (Wales) Jason Tovey ^{(loan)} (New Zealand) Jade Te Rure | Centres (Ireland) Michael Allen (New Zealand) Sam Beard (New Zealand) Phil Burleigh (Scotland) Chris Dean (Scotland) James Johnstone ^{WCC} (Scotland) Matt Scott (South Africa) Andries Strauss Back Three (Scotland) Tom Brown (Scotland) Jack Cuthbert (Scotland) Dougie Fife (Tonga) Will Helu (Scotland) Damien Hoyland (Tonga) Otulea Katoa ^{WCC} (Scotland) Nick McLennan |

(c) Denotes team captain,

Italicised denotes Scottish qualified

WCC – World Cup Cover

=== Transfers ===
==== Personnel In ====
- (Scotland) Magnus Bradbury from Scottish Rugby Academy
- (Tonga) William Helu from (England) Wasps
- (New Zealand) Nasi Manu from Highlanders/Canterbury
- (Scotland) Rory Sutherland from Scottish Rugby Academy
- (England) Nathan Fowles from Sale Sharks
- (Ireland) Michael Allen from Ulster Rugby
- (Scotland) Blair Kinghorn
- (Scotland) Duncan Hodge from (Scotland) Scottish national team
- (Scotland) Murdo McAndrew 4 month trial
- (Tonga) Otulea Katoa from (New Zealand) Southland Rugby
- (Scotland) John Hardie from (New Zealand) Southland Rugby and Highlanders
- (Wales) Jason Tovey from Newport Gwent Dragons(loan)

==== Players Out ====
- (Scotland) Tom Heathcote to (England) Worcester Warriors
- (Scotland) Grayson Hart to (Scotland) Glasgow Warriors
- (Scotland) Ollie Atkins to (England) Exeter Chiefs
- (Scotland) Tim Visser to (England) Harlequins
- (South Africa) Carl Bezuidenhout Retired
- Jamie Farndale to Scotland 7s
- (Scotland) Hugh Blake to Glasgow Warriors
- (Argentina) Joaquín Domínguez to (France) US Cognac
- (Argentina) Tomás Leonardi to (France) Toulouse
- (Australia) James Hilterbrand to (Australia) Manly
- (Scotland) David Denton to Bath Rugby
- (Scotland) Greig Tonks to London Irish

== Competitions ==
=== Preseason ===
==== Match 1 ====
21 August 2015
18:00

| Edinburgh (Scotland) | 31-16 | Romania |
| Try: Grant (3), Te Rure, Du Preez; Con: Fowles, Te Rure (2) | Report | Try: Apostol; Con: Dumbrava; Pen: Dumbrava, Vlaicu (2) |

The Greenyards, Melrose
Attendance: 1300

==== Match 2 ====
29 August 2014
19:45

| Edinburgh (Scotland) | 23-10 | (Ireland) Ulster |
| | Report |

Goldenacre, Edinburgh
Attendance: 2124
Referee: Sam Grove-White (SRU)

=== Player statistics ===
During the 2015–16 season, Edinburgh have used forty different players in competitive games. The table below shows the number of appearances and points scored by each player.

As of 06 April 2015 (UTC)

| Position | Nation | Name | Pro12 | | | Challenge Cup | | | Total | |
| Position | Nation | Name | Apps (sub) | Points | | Apps (sub) | Points | | Apps (sub) | Total Pts |
| Position | Nation | Name | Apps (sub) | Try | Kick | Apps (sub) | Try | Kick | Apps (sub) | Total Pts |
|---|---|---|---|---|---|---|---|---|---|---|
| HK | (Scotland) | Neil Cochrane | 12(4) | 0 | 0 | 1(4) | 0 | 0 | 13(8) | 0 |
| HK | (Scotland) | Ross Ford | 7 | 0 | 0 | 4 | 0 | 0 | 11 | 0 |
| HK | (Scotland) | Stuart McInally | (4) | 0 | 0 | 1 | 0 | 0 | 1(4) | 0 |
| HK | (Scotland) | George Turner | (8) | 0 | 0 | (1) | 0 | 0 | (9) | 0 |
| PR | (Ireland) | John Andress | 11(8) | 1 | 0 | 2(1) | 0 | 0 | 13(9) | 5 |
| PR | (New Zealand) | Simon Berghan | (11) | 0 | 0 | (4) | 0 | 0 | (15) | 0 |
| PR | (South Africa) | Allan Dell | 3(10) | 1 | 0 | (1) | 0 | 0 | 3(11) | 5 |
| PR | (Scotland) | Alasdair Dickinson | 5 | 1 | 0 | 3 | 0 | 0 | 8 | 5 |
| PR | (Scotland) | WP Nel | 8 | 1 | 0 | 4 | 0 | 0 | 12 | 5 |
| PR | (Scotland) | Grant Shiells | (2) | 0 | 0 | (2) | 0 | 0 | (4) | 0 |
| PR | (Scotland) | Rory Sutherland | 11(3) | 0 | 0 | 3(2) | 0 | 0 | 14(5) | 0 |
| LK | (Namibia) | Anton Bresler | 15 | 0 | 0 | 5(1) | 0 | 0 | 21(1) | 0 |
| LK | (Scotland) | Grant Gilchrist | 0(1) | 0 | 0 | 0 | 0 | 0 | 0(1) | 0 |
| LK | (Scotland) | Fraser McKenzie | 6(1) | 0 | 0 | 1 | 0 | 0 | 7(1) | 0 |
| LK | (Australia) | Alex Toolis | 7(9) | 2 | 0 | 4(1) | 0 | 0 | 11(10) | 10 |
| LK | (Scotland) | Ben Toolis | 8(1) | 1 | 0 | 2 | 0 | 0 | 10(1) | 5 |
| BR | (Scotland) | Magnus Bradbury | (4) | 0 | 0 | 1(1) | 1 | 0 | 1(5) | 5 |
| BR | (New Zealand) | Mike Coman | 13 | 0 | 0 | 3(1) | 1 | 0 | 16(1) | 5 |
| BR | (Scotland) | Roddy Grant | 4(1) | 0 | 0 | 0 | 0 | 0 | 4(1) | 0 |
| BR | (Scotland) | John Hardie | 5 | 1 | 0 | 4 | 3 | 0 | 9 | 20 |
| BR | (New Zealand) | Nasi Manu | 5(1) | 0 | 0 | 1(1) | 0 | 0 | 6(2) | 0 |
| BR | (South Africa) | Cornell du Preez | 16(3) | 3 | 0 | 6 | 3 | 0 | 21(3) | 30 |
| BR | (Scotland) | Jamie Ritchie | 5(4) | 0 | 0 | 2(2) | 0 | 0 | 7(6) | 0 |
| BR | (Scotland) | Hamish Watson | 10(5) | 3 | 0 | 2(2) | 1 | 0 | 11(7) | 20 |
| SH | (England) | Nathan Fowles | 5(2) | 0 | 15 | 1(2) | 0 | 0 | 6(4) | 15 |
| SH | (Scotland) | Sam Hidalgo-Clyne | 8(3) | 1 | 66 | 3(1) | 0 | 30 | 11(4) | 111 |
| SH | (Scotland) | Sean Kennedy | 6(6) | 0 | 0 | 2(1) | 0 | 0 | 8(7) | 0 |
| FH | (Scotland) | Blair Kinghorn | 6(6) | 0 | 18 | (2) | 0 | 0 | 6(8) | 18 |
| FH | (New Zealand) | Phil Burleigh | 17 | 4 | 0 | 2 | 0 | 0 | 19 | 20 |
| FH | (Scotland) | Greig Tonks | 9(2) | 0 | 44 | 6 | 1 | 23 | 15(2) | 72 |
| FH | (Wales) | Jason Tovey | 1 | 0 | 9 | 0 | 0 | 0 | 1 | 9 |
| CE | (Ireland) | Mike Allen | 9(2) | 0 | 0 | 3 | 0 | 0 | 12(2) | 0 |
| CE | (New Zealand) | Sam Beard | 7(1) | 1 | 0 | 0 | 0 | 0 | 7(1) | 5 |
| CE | (Scotland) | Chris Dean | 8(4) | 1 | 0 | 1(2) | 0 | 0 | 9(6) | 5 |
| CE | (Scotland) | James Johnstone | (3) | 0 | 0 | 0 | 0 | 0 | (3) | 0 |
| CE | (Scotland) | Matt Scott | 7 | 2 | 0 | 4 | 0 | 0 | 11 | 10 |
| CE | (South Africa) | Andries Strauss | 4(3) | 0 | 0 | 2(1) | 0 | 0 | 6(4) | 0 |
| WG | (Scotland) | Tom Brown | 13 | 1 | 0 | 4(1) | 1 | 0 | 16(1) | 10 |
| WG | (Scotland) | Dougie Fife | 8(4) | 0 | 0 | 3(2) | 0 | 0 | 11(6) | 0 |
| WG | (Tonga) | Will Helu | 6(2) | 1 | 0 | 4 | 1 | 0 | 10(2) | 10 |
| WG | (Scotland) | Damien Hoyland | 14 | 8 | 0 | 4(1) | 0 | 0 | 18(1) | 40 |
| WG | (Tonga) | Otulea Katoa | 0 | 0 | 0 | 2 | 0 | 0 | 2 | 0 |
| FB | (Scotland) | Jack Cuthbert | 7(1) | 0 | 4 | 1(1) | 0 | 0 | 8(2) | 4 |
| FB | (Scotland) | Nick McLennan | (1) | 0 | 0 | 0 | 0 | 0 | (1) | 0 |

=== Pro12 ===
==== League table ====
2015–16 Pro12
| | Team | Played | Won | Drawn | Lost | Points For | Points Against | Points Diff | Tries For | Tries Against | Try Bonus | Losing Bonus | Points |
| 1 | (Ireland) Leinster (RU) | 22 | 16 | 0 | 6 | 458 | 290 | +168 | 51 | 27 | 6 | 3 | 73 |
| 2 | (Ireland) Connacht (CH) | 22 | 15 | 0 | 7 | 507 | 406 | +101 | 60 | 46 | 8 | 5 | 73 |
| 3 | (Scotland) Glasgow Warriors (SF) | 22 | 14 | 1 | 7 | 557 | 380 | +177 | 68 | 37 | 8 | 6 | 72 |
| 4 | (Ireland) Ulster (SF) | 22 | 14 | 0 | 8 | 488 | 307 | +181 | 61 | 29 | 8 | 5 | 69 |
| 5 | (Wales) Scarlets | 22 | 14 | 0 | 8 | 477 | 458 | +19 | 45 | 54 | 2 | 5 | 63 |
| 6 | (Ireland) Munster | 22 | 13 | 0 | 9 | 459 | 417 | +42 | 56 | 36 | 6 | 5 | 63 |
| 7 | (Wales) Cardiff Blues | 22 | 11 | 0 | 11 | 542 | 461 | +81 | 62 | 53 | 5 | 7 | 56 |
| 8 | (Wales) Ospreys | 22 | 11 | 1 | 10 | 490 | 455 | +35 | 55 | 49 | 6 | 3 | 55 |
| 9 | (Scotland) Edinburgh | 22 | 11 | 0 | 11 | 405 | 366 | +39 | 41 | 36 | 2 | 8 | 54 |
| 10 | (Wales) Newport Gwent Dragons | 22 | 4 | 0 | 18 | 353 | 492 | −139 | 33 | 57 | 0 | 10 | 26 |
| 11 | (Italy) Zebre | 22 | 5 | 0 | 17 | 308 | 718 | −410 | 35 | 99 | 3 | 1 | 24 |
| 12 | (Italy) Benetton Treviso | 22 | 3 | 0 | 19 | 320 | 614 | −294 | 35 | 79 | 0 | 8 | 20 |
If teams are level at any stage, tiebreakers are applied in the following order: 1. number of matches won; 2. the difference between points for and points against; 3. the number of tries scored; 4. the most points scored; 5. the difference between tries for and tries against; 6. the fewest red cards received; 7. the fewest yellow cards received.
Green background (rows 1 to 4) were play-off places, and earned places in the 2016–17 European Rugby Champions Cup. Blue background indicates teams outside the play-off places that earned places in the European Rugby Champions Cup. To facilitate the 2015 Rugby World Cup, there were no play-offs for the 2016–17 European Rugby Champions Cup; the 20th place went to the winner of the 2015–16 European Rugby Challenge Cup if not already qualified. Because Challenge Cup winner Montpellier qualified via the Top 14, its place passed to the top team from that league not already qualified. Plain background indicates teams that earned a place in the 2016–17 European Rugby Challenge Cup.

==== Results ====
===== Round 1 =====
4 September 2015
19:35

| Edinburgh (Scotland) | 16–9 | (Ireland) Leinster (1 BP) |
| Try: Hoyland (2) 54' m, 78' m Pen: Fowles (1/3) 24'; Cuthbert (1/2) 70' | Report | Pen: Nacewa (3/5) 16', 57', 72' |

Meggetland
Attendance: 2,478
Referee: Peter Fitzgibbon (IRFU)

===== Round 2 =====
12 September 2015
17:10

| (1 BP) Benetton Treviso (Italy) | 24–27 | (Scotland) Edinburgh |
| Try: Pratichetti 40' c Naude 41' m Con: Hayward (1/2); Pen: Hayward (4/4) 24', 29', 38', 56' | Report | Try: Burleigh 4' c Hoyland 12' c Beard 33' c Con: Tonks (3/3); Pen: Tonks (2/4) 25', 72' |

Stadio Comunale di Monigo
Attendance: 4,000
Referee: Gary Conway (IRFU)

===== Round 3 =====
2 October 2015
18:00

| Edinburgh (Scotland) | 20–9 | (Wales) Ospreys |
| Try: Burleigh 37' c Andress 73' c Con: Tonks (1/1); Cuthbert (1/1); Pen: Tonks (2/2) 47', 63' | Report | Pen: Davies (3/5) 4', 17', 40' |

Murrayfield Stadium
Attendance: 2,475
Referee: Andrew Brace (IRFU)

===== Round 4 =====
16 October 2015
19:45

| Edinburgh (Scotland) | 16–10 | (Ireland) Ulster (1 BP) |
| Try: Watson 54' c Con: Tonks (1/1); Pen: Tonks (3/4) 5', 17', 65' | Report | Try: Reidy 44' c Con: Nelson (1/1); Pen: Nelson (1/1) 24' |

Murrayfield Stadium
Attendance: 4,324
Referee: Dudley Phillips (IRFU)

===== Round 5 =====
24 October 2015
14:30

| Zebre (Italy) | 19–11 | (Scotland) Edinburgh |
| Try: Berryman 54' c Con: Canna (1/1); Pen: Canna (4/5) 10', 19', 26', 59' | Report | Try: Watson 37' m Pen: Fowles (2/3) 8', 33' |

Stadio Sergio Lanfranchi
Attendance: 1,500
Referee: Peter Fitzgibbon (IRFU)

===== Round 6 =====
31 October 2015
18:45

| Connacht (Ireland) | 14–9 | (Scotland) Edinburgh (1 BP) |
| Try: O'Halloran 9' m Pen: Carty (3/5) 7', 44', 55' | Report | Pen: Hidalgo-Clyne (2/2) 15', 53'; Kinghorn (1/1) 37' |

Galway Sportsgrounds
Attendance: 3,834
Referee: Leighton Hodges (WRU)

===== Round 7 =====
7 November 2015
17:15

| (1 BP) Edinburgh (Scotland) | 14–16 | (Ireland) Munster |
| Try: Helu 46' m Pen: Hidalgo-Clyne (3/3) 10', 39', 56' | Report | Try: J. Ryan 7' c Con: Keatley (1/1); Pen: Keatley (3/4) 29', 61', 67' |

Murrayfield Stadium
Attendance: 4,981
Referee: David Wilkinson (IRFU)

===== Round 8 =====
27 November 2015
19:35

| (1 BP) Edinburgh (Scotland) | 32–13 | (Wales) Newport Gwent Dragons |
| Try: Nel 18' c Dickinson 59' c Brown 72' m Scott 76' c Con: Hidalgo-Clyne (2/3); Kinghorn (1/1); Pen: Hidalgo-Clyne (2/2) 6', 27' | Report | Try: Cudd 80' c Con: D. Jones (1/1); Pen: D. Jones (2/2) 15', 34' |

Murrayfield Stadium
Attendance: 3,294
Referee: Marius Mitrea (FIR)

===== Round 9 =====
4 December 2015
19:35

| Ulster (Ireland) | 14–7 | (Scotland) Edinburgh (1 BP) |
| Try: penalty try 4' c Scholes 10' c Con: Pad. Jackson (2/2) | Report | Try: Du Preez 47' c Con: Cuthbert (1/1) |

Kingspan Stadium
Attendance: 12,640
Referee: Ian Davies (WRU)

===== Round 10 (1872 Cup - 23-11 agg.) =====
27 December 2015
15:05

| Edinburgh (Scotland) | 23–11 | (Scotland) Glasgow Warriors |
| Try: Scott 12' c Hardie 69' c Con: Hidalgo-Clyne (2/2); Pen: Hidalgo-Clyne (3/4) 30', 50', 59' | Report | Try: Bennett 6' m Pen: Russell (2/2) 47', 56' |

Murrayfield Stadium
Attendance: 23,642
Referee: John Lacey (IRFU)

===== Round 11 (1872 Cup - 34-25 agg.) =====
2 January 2016
17:15

| (1 BP) Glasgow Warriors (Scotland) | 11–14 | (Scotland) Edinburgh |
| Try: Bennett 31' m Pen: Weir (2/2) 5', 54' | Report | Try: Burleigh 74' m Pen: Hidalgo-Clyne (3/4) 16', 25', 67' |

Murrayfield Stadium
Attendance: 8,000
Referee: Peter Fitzgibbon (IRFU)

===== Round 12 =====
8 January 2016
19:30

| Edinburgh (Scotland) | 28–13 | (Italy) Benetton Treviso |
| Try: Hoyland (2) 12' c, 80' m penalty try 58' c Con: Hidalgo-Clyne (2/2); Pen: Hidalgo-Clyne (3/3) 7', 46', 50' | Report | Try: McLean 64' c Con: Ambrosini (1/1); Pen: Ambrosini (2/2) 17', 24' |

Murrayfield Stadium
Attendance: 3,159
Referee: Gary Conway (IRFU)

===== Round 13 =====
30 January 2016
17:15

| Cardiff Blues (Wales) | 10–3 | (Scotland) Edinburgh (1 BP) |
| Try: Fish 1' c Con: Patchell (1/1); Pen: Patchell (1/3) 15' | Report | Pen: Fowles (1/1) 21' |

Cardiff Arms Park
Attendance: 6,058
Referee: David Wilkinson (IRFU)

===== Round 14 =====
12 February 2016
20:15

| Scarlets (Wales) | 22–21 | (Scotland) Edinburgh (1 BP) |
| Try: Allen 5' c Con: S. Shingler (1/1); Pen: S. Shingler (1/1) 17'; A. Thomas (4/4) 23', 46', 53', 76' | Report | Try: Du Preez 57' m A. Toolis 73' c Con: Tonks (1/2); Pen: Fowles (2/3) 20', 42'; Tonks (1/1) 66' |

Parc y Scarlets
Attendance: 5,569
Referee: Andrew Brace (IRFU)

===== Round 15 =====
19 February 2016
19:05

| Ospreys (Wales) | 27–13 | (Scotland) Edinburgh |
| Try: Underhill 34' c Otten 76' m Con: S. Davies (1/2); Pen: S. Davies (5/5) 13', 24', 45', 62', 71' | Report | Try: Dell 25' c Con: Tonks (1/1); Pen: Tonks (2/4) 11', 17' |

Liberty Stadium
Attendance: 7,264
Referee: Marius Mitrea (FIR)

===== Round 16 =====
28 February 2016
14:05

| Edinburgh (Scotland) | 24–23 | (Wales) Scarlets (1 BP) |
| Try: Burleigh 11' c B. Toolis 68' m Con: Kinghorn (1/2); Pen: Kinghorn (4/4) 5', 22', 40', 42' | Report | Try: Parkes 15' m J. Davies 26' m S. Evans 35' c Con: Thomas (1/3); Pen: Thomas (2/4) 7', 14' |

Murrayfield Stadium
Attendance: 3,618
Referee: Dudley Phillips (IRFU)

===== Round 17 =====
4 March 2016
19:35

| (1 BP) Edinburgh (Scotland) | 23–28 | (Ireland) Connacht (1 BP) |
| Try: Dean 43' m Hoyland 51' c Du Preez 59' m Con: Hidalgo-Clyne (1/3); Pen: Hidalgo-Clyne (2/3) 68', 80' | Report | Try: MacGinty 20' c Heenan 32' c Aki 45' c E. McKeon 72' c Con: Ronaldson (3/3); MacGinty (1/1) |

Murrayfield Stadium
Attendance: 3,584
Referee: Ben Whitehouse (WRU)

===== Round 18 =====
27 March 2016
14:30

| (1 BP) Newport Gwent Dragons (Wales) | 15–16 | (Scotland) Edinburgh |
| Try: Amos (2) 41' c, 53' m Con: D. Jones (1/2); Pen: D. Jones (1/2) 38' | Report | Try: Watson 44' c Con: Hidalgo-Clyne (1/1); Pen: Kinghorn (1/2) 17'; Hidalgo-Clyne (2/4) 30', 40' |

Rodney Parade
Attendance: 6,352
Referee: George Clancy (IRFU)

===== Round 19 =====
1 April 2016
19:35

| (1 BP) Edinburgh (Scotland) | 29–0 | (Italy) Zebre |
| Try: Hoyland (2) 51' c, 56' c Hidalgo-Clyne 68' c A. Toolis 80' m Con: Tovey (3/4); Pen: Tovey (1/1) 13' | Report |

Murrayfield Stadium
Attendance: 3,799
Referee: Leighton Hodges (WRU)

=== European Rugby Challenge Cup ===
==== Table ====
| Pos | Team | Pld | W | D | L | PF | PA | PD | TF | TA | TB | LB | Pts |
|---|---|---|---|---|---|---|---|---|---|---|---|---|---|
| 1 | (France) Grenoble (4) | 6 | 5 | 0 | 1 | 187 | 154 | +33 | 22 | 19 | 2 | 0 | 22 |
| 2 | (England) London Irish (8) | 6 | 3 | 0 | 3 | 170 | 106 | +64 | 25 | 10 | 3 | 2 | 17 |
| 3 | (Scotland) Edinburgh | 6 | 4 | 0 | 2 | 125 | 103 | +22 | 14 | 12 | 1 | 0 | 17 |
| 4 | (France) Agen | 6 | 0 | 0 | 6 | 98 | 217 | −119 | 13 | 32 | 1 | 1 | 2 |

Source: espn.co.uk

==== Results ====
===== Round 1 =====
13 November 2015
19:30

| Edinburgh (Scotland) | 28–10 | (France) Grenoble |
| Try: Du Preez (2) 5' m, 78' c Penalty try 59' c Con: Hidalgo-Clyne (1/2) 62'; Tonks (1/1) 79'; Pen: Hidalgo-Clyne (3/3) 32', 39', 44' | Report | Try: Kilioni 70' c Con: Bosch (1/1) 71'; Pen: Hart (1/1) 49' |

Murrayfield Stadium
Attendance: 3,264
Referee: Ben Whitehouse (WRU)

===== Round 2 =====
20 November 2015
19:30

| Agen (France) | 6–27 | (Scotland) Edinburgh |
| Pen: Darbo (2/2) 50', 55' | Report | Try: Penalty try 32' c Du Preez 42' c Hardie 69' c Con: Penalty try (3/3) 33', 43', 70'; Pen: Tonks (2/2) 20', 23' |

Stade Armandie
Attendance: 4,532
Referee: Peter Fitzgibbon (IRFU)

===== Round 3 =====
12 December 2015
15:00

| (1 BP) London Irish (England) | 38–6 | (Scotland) Edinburgh |
| Try: Fenby (3) 9' m, 13' c, 76' c Lewington 27' c Williams 40' c Tikoirotuma 60' m Con: Geraghty (4/6) 14', 28', 40', 77' | Report | Pen: Tonks (2/3) 3', 8' |

Madejski Stadium
Attendance: 3,959
Referee: Leighton Hodges (WRU)

===== Round 4 =====
18 December 2015
19:30

| Edinburgh (Scotland) | 18–15 | (England) London Irish (1 BP) |
| Try: Brown 16' c Hardie 71' m Con: Hidalgo-Clyne (1/2) 17'; Pen: Hidalgo-Clyne (2/3) 20', 36' | Report | Try: Ellis 8' m Smallbone 59 'c Con: Geraghty (1/2) 60'; Pen: Geraghty (1/1) 28' |

Murrayfield Stadium
Attendance: 3,551
Referee: Tom Foley (RFU)

===== Round 5 =====
15 January 2016
19:30

| (1 BP) Edinburgh (Scotland) | 23–0 | (France) Agen |
| Try: Bradbury 35' m Coman 59' m Tonks 68' m Watson 73' m Pen: Tonks (1/1) 19' | Report |

Murrayfield Stadium
Attendance: 3,100
Referee: Ian Davies (WRU)

===== Round 6 =====
23 January 2016
20:45

| Grenoble (France) | 34–23 | (Scotland) Edinburgh |
| Try: Heguy 30' c Aplon (2) 69' c, 78' m Con: Wisniewski (2/3) 32', 70'; Pen: Wisniewski (5/6) 15', 18', 51', 57', 77' | Report | Try: Hardie 3' c Helu 34' c Con: Hidalgo-Clyne (2/2) 5', 35'; Pen: Hidalgo-Clyne (3/4) 27', 54', 67' |

Stade des Alpes
Attendance: 10,072
Referee: Greg Garner (RFU)
