= 2013–14 Edinburgh Rugby season =

Edinburgh 2013 / 2014
- Ground(s): Murrayfield Stadium, Meggetland
- CEO: (England) David Davies
- Coach: (South Africa) Alan Solomons
- Captain: (Scotland) Greig Laidlaw
- Most caps: (South Africa) WP Nel (28)
- Top scorer: (Scotland) Greig Laidlaw (129)
- Most tries: (South Africa) Cornell du Preez (7)
- League: Pro12
1st kit	2nd kit

The 2013–14 season was Edinburgh Rugby's thirteenth season competing in the Pro12.

== Team ==
=== Coaches ===
Alan Solomons, formerly of Western Province, Stormers, Ulster and more recently Super 15 team the Kings was appointed as Head Coach at the end of July '13. Stevie Scott, Philippe Doussy and Omar Mouneimne were appointed as Assistant Coaches.

=== Squad ===
Hookers (Scotland) Ross Ford (United States) James Hilterbrand* (Scotland) Steven Lawrie (Scotland) Stuart McInally (Tonga) Aleki Lutui (Scotland) Alun Walker Props (Namibia) Wicus Blaauw (New Zealand) Simon Berghan* (Scotland) Geoff Cross (Scotland) Alasdair Dickinson (Scotland) Robin Hislop (South Africa) WP Nel (Scotland) Lewis Niven Locks (Scotland) Oliver Atkins (Scotland) Grant Gilchrist (Scotland) Rob McAlpine (England) Perry Parker (South Africa) Izak van der Westhuizen	Loose forwards (Georgia (country)) Dimitri Basilaia (New Zealand) Mike Coman (England) Sean Cox (Scotland) David Denton (South Africa) Cornell du Preez (Scotland) Roddy Grant (Argentina) Tomás Leonardi (Scotland) Ross Rennie Half backs (Scotland) Alex Black (South Africa) Carl Bezuidenhout (England) Piers Francis (Scotland) Grayson Hart (Scotland) Sam Hidalgo-Clyne (Scotland) Sean Kennedy (Scotland) Greig Laidlaw (C) (England) Chris Leck (Scotland) Harry Leonard	Centres (New Zealand) Ben Atiga (New Zealand) Sam Beard (Scotland) Nick De Luca (Argentina) Joaquín Domínguez (Scotland) Matt Scott (South Africa) Andries Strauss Back Three (Scotland) Tom Brown (Scotland) Jack Cuthbert (Scotland) Dougie Fife (Scotland) Lee Jones (Scotland) Greig Tonks (Scotland) Tim Visser (Scotland) Nikki Walker

- *Scottish qualified

=== Elite Development Players ===
- (Scotland) Alex Allan - Prop
- (Scotland) Chris Auld - Centre
- (Scotland) Magnus Bradbury - Back row
- (Scotland) Philip Cringle - Prop
- (Scotland) Bruce Dick - Centre
- (Scotland) Jamie Farndale - Wing
- (Scotland) Neil Irvine-Hess - Lock/Back row
- (Scotland) Ewan McQuillin - Prop
- (Australia) / (Scotland) Alex Toolis - Lock
- (Australia) / (Scotland) Ben Toolis - Lock
- (Scotland) George Turner - Hooker
- (Scotland) Hamish Watson - Back row

=== Transfers ===
==== Players In ====
- (Scotland) Nikki Walker from (England) Worcester Warriors
- (Scotland) Jack Cuthbert from (England) Bath Rugby
- (Tonga) Aleki Lutui from (England) Worcester Warriors
- (Scotland) Alasdair Dickinson from (England) Sale Sharks
- (New Zealand) Grayson Hart from (Australia) NSW Waratahs
- (Australia) Oliver Atkins from (Australia) NSW Waratahs
- (Namibia) Wicus Blaauw from (France) Biarritz
- (Australia) James Hilterbrand from (Australia) Western Force
- (Scotland) Michael Tait from (England) Newcastle Falcons (Month loan from Falcons)
- (Argentina) Joaquín Domínguez from (Argentina) San Isidro Club
- (South Africa) Cornell du Preez from the (South Africa) Eastern Province Kings / (South Africa) Southern Kings
- (Argentina) Tomás Leonardi from (South Africa) Southern Kings
- (New Zealand) Mike Coman from (New Zealand) Hawke's Bay / (New Zealand) Huricannes
- (New Zealand) Sam Beard from (New Zealand) Bay of Plenty
- (England) Tony Fenner from (Italy) Viadana (Loan)
- (South Africa) Carl Bezuidenhout from (South Africa) Pumas
- (South Africa) Andries Strauss from the (South Africa) Eastern Province Kings / (South Africa) Southern Kings
- (New Zealand) / (Scotland) Simon Berghan from (New Zealand) Sydenham RFC

==== Players Out ====
- Lee Jones to Scotland 7s (loan until the end of the season)
- (Wales) Richie Rees to (Wales) Newport Gwent Dragons
- (Fiji) Netani Talei to (Wales) Newport Gwent Dragons
- (Netherlands) Sep Visser released
- (England) Mike Penn to (England) Moseley
- (England) Andy Titterrell to (England) London Welsh
- (Scotland) Allan Jacobsen retired
- (Scotland) James King retired
- (Scotland) Steven Turnbull retired
- (Wales) John Yapp to London Irish
- (Scotland) Alun Walker to Nottingham RFC (loan until the end of the season)
- (Scotland) Robin Hislop to Rotherham R.U.F.C. (loan until the end of the season)
- (Scotland) Stuart McInally to Bristol RFC (loan until the end of the season)
- (Scotland) Ross Rennie to Bristol RFC (loan until the end of the season)
- (England) Perry Parker to Ospreys (loan until the end of the season)
- (Scotland) Lee Jones to Glasgow Warriors (loan until the end of the season)
- (Scotland) Sean Kennedy to London Irish (month loan)
- (Scotland) Geoff Cross to Glasgow Warriors (loan until the end of the season)

== Sponsorship ==
This year saw the shirts branded with BT Sport on four-year sponsorship and continuing relationship with sportswear company Macron. The BT Sports deals was seen as way to circumvent Sky Sports’ ban on carrying adverts for its new sports channels after agreeing a sponsorship deal under which its logo will be emblazoned all over BSkyB's Scottish rugby coverage.

- BT Sport
- Mitsubishi Cars

== Competitions ==
=== Pro12 ===
==== League table ====
Pro12 Table
	Team	Played	Won	Drawn	Lost	Points For	Points Against	Points Difference	Tries For	Tries Against	Try Bonus	Losing Bonus	Points
1	(Ireland) Leinster (CH)	22	17	1	4	554	352	+202	57	30	8	4	82
2	(Scotland) Glasgow Warriors (RU)	22	18	0	4	484	309	+175	53	22	4	3	79
3	(Ireland) Munster (SF)	22	16	0	6	538	339	+199	56	27	7	3	74
4	(Ireland) Ulster (SF)	22	15	0	7	470	319	+151	45	26	6	4	70
5	(Wales) Ospreys	22	13	1	8	571	388	+183	59	32	6	6	66
6	(Wales) Scarlets	22	11	1	10	435	438	−3	43	45	3	6	55
7	(Wales) Cardiff Blues	22	8	1	13	425	538	−113	32	55	1	6	41
8	(Scotland) Edinburgh	22	7	0	15	397	526	−129	38	57	2	8	38
9	(Wales) Newport Gwent Dragons	22	7	1	14	392	492	−100	34	46	0	5	35
10	(Ireland) Connacht	22	6	0	16	371	509	−138	42	54	4	7	35
11	(Italy) Benetton Treviso	22	5	1	16	376	591	−215	31	72	1	7	30
12	(Italy) Zebre	22	5	2	15	347	559	−212	35	59	0	5	29
If teams are level at any stage, tiebreakers are applied in the following order: 1. number of matches won; 2. the difference between points for and points against; 3. the number of tries scored; 4. the most points scored; 5. the difference between tries for and tries against; 6. the fewest red cards received; 7. the fewest yellow cards received.
Green background (rows 1 to 4) are play-off places, and earn a place in the European Rugby Champions Cup. Blue background indicates teams outside the play-off places, that earn a place in the European Rugby Champions Cup. Plain background indicates teams that earn a place in the European Rugby Challenge Cup. European Rugby Champions/Challenge Cup qualification: The top team from each country, plus the three highest-placed teams apart from those, will qualify for the European Rugby Champions Cup. The remaining teams qualify for the European Rugby Challenge Cup. Updated 19 May 2014. Source: RaboDirect PRO12

==== Results ====
===== Round 1 =====
7 September 2013
19:15

(1 BP) Munster (Ireland)	34–23	(Scotland) Edinburgh
Try: Hurley 13' m Coughlan 15' c Cronin 32' c Dineen 53' m Hanrahan 68' c Con: Keatley (2/4); Hanrahan (1/1); Pen: Keatley (1/2) 22'	Report	Try: De Luca 50' c Jones 70' c Con: Francis (1/1); Leonard (1/1); Pen: Francis (2/4) 11', 26'; Leonard (1/1) 62'

Musgrave Park
Attendance: 6,810
Referee: Marius Mitrea (FIR)

===== Round 2 =====
13 September 2013
19:45

Edinburgh (Scotland)	16–13	(Wales) Newport Gwent Dragons (1 BP)
Try: T. Visser 47' c Con: Leonard (1/1); Pen: Leonard (3/4) 5', 20', 80'	Report	Try: Rees 53' c Con: Tovey (1/1); Pen: Tovey (1/2) 3'; Burton (1/1) 75'

Murrayfield Stadium
Attendance: 3,692
Referee: Dudley Phillips (IRFU)

===== Round 3 =====
21 September 2013
18:30

(1 BP) Ospreys (Wales)	44–10	(Scotland) Edinburgh
Try: Hassler 3' c Walker (2) 38' m, 55' c Hibbard (2) 42' m, 53' c Morgan 77' c Con: Biggar (3/5); Morgan (1/1); Pen: Biggar (2/2) 16', 19'	Report	Try: T. Visser 45' c Con: Leonard (1/1); Pen: Leonard (1/1) 32'

Liberty Stadium
Attendance: 8,356
Referee: Marius Mitrea (FIR)

===== Round 4 =====
27 September 2013
19:45

Edinburgh (Scotland)	9–22	(Wales) Scarlets
Pen: Leonard (3/3) 29', 40', 42'	Report	Try: Reynolds 35' c J. Williams 46' m J. Davies 72' c Con: Priestland (2/3); Pen: Priestland (1/2) 32'

Murrayfield Stadium
Attendance: 3,586
Referee: David Wilkinson (IRFU)

===== Round 5 =====
6 October 2013
14:05

Cardiff Blues (Wales)	29–12	(Scotland) Edinburgh Rugby
Try: Cuthbert (2) 28' c, 66' c Con: Halfpenny (2/2); Pen: Halfpenny (5/6) 4', 26', 53', 57', 60'	Report	Pen: Laidlaw (4/5) 16', 24', 32', 38'

Cardiff Arms Park
Attendance: 7,245
Referee: George Clancy (IRFU)

===== Round 6 =====
25 October 2013
19:45

Edinburgh (Scotland)	20–13	(Italy) Benetton Treviso (1 BP)
Try: Tonks 11' c Nel 74' c Con: Laidlaw (2/2); Pen: Laidlaw (2/3) 40', 53'	Report	Try: McLean 61' c Con: Botes (1/1); Pen: Ambrosini (1/2) 36'; Botes (1/1) 67'

Murrayfield Stadium
Attendance: 3,993
Referee: Alain Rolland (IRFU)

===== Round 7 =====
1 November 2013
19:45

Edinburgh (Scotland)	25–23	(Italy) Zebre (1 BP)
Try: Tonks 20' m Nel 28' c du Preez 55' c Con: Leonard (2/3); Pen: Leonard (2/3) 43', 63'	Report	Try: Iannone 31' c Sarto 40' c Con: Orquera (2/2); Pen: Orquera (3/3) 17', 68', 74'

Murrayfield Stadium
Attendance: 3,156
Referee: Leighton Hodges (WRU)

===== Round 8 =====
22 November 2013
19:05

(1 BP) Ulster (Ireland)	41–17	(Scotland) Edinburgh
Try: Gilroy (2) 28' c, 64' c P. Marshall 33' c Diack 61' c McKinney 66' c Con: McKinney (5/5); Pen: McKinney (2/2) 20', 40'	Report	Try: du Preez 15' m Fife 72' m Hart 75' c Con: Leonard (1/3)

Ravenhill Stadium
Attendance: 12,955
Referee: Neil Hennessy (WRU)

===== Round 9 =====
29 November 2013
19:45

(1 BP) Edinburgh (Scotland)	43–10	(Ireland) Connacht
Try: Fife 40' c du Preez 73' c De Luca 77' c Nel 79' c Con: Laidlaw (4/4); Pen: Laidlaw (5/5) 9', 20', 29', 51', 59'	Report	Try: Henshaw 15' c Con: Parks (1/1); Drop: Parks (1/1) 11'

Murrayfield Stadium
Attendance: 3,515
Referee: Leighton Hodges (WRU)

===== Round 10 =====
20 December 2013
19:35

Edinburgh (Scotland)	11–6	(Ireland) Leinster (1 BP)
Try: Fife 31' m Pen: Laidlaw (2/3) 38', 47'	Report	Pen: Madigan (2/2) 22', 43'

Murrayfield Stadium
Attendance: 3,321
Referee: Peter Fitzgibbon (IRFU)

===== Round 11 =====
26 December 2013
15:05

(1 BP) Edinburgh (Scotland)	16–20	(Scotland) Glasgow Warriors
Try: Fife 14' c Con: Laidlaw (1/1); Pen: Laidlaw (3/4) 8', 27', 39'	Report	Try: Hogg 67' m Pen: Weir (5/5) 3', 12', 22', 51', 62'

Murrayfield Stadium
Attendance: 10,125
Referee: Neil Paterson (SRU)

===== Round 12 =====
1 January 2014
18:05

Glasgow Warriors (Scotland)	P–P	(Scotland) Edinburgh
	Postponed due to a waterlogged pitch.

Scotstoun Stadium
Referee: Andrew McMenemy (SRU)

===== Round 13 =====
9 February 2014
13:05

Newport Gwent Dragons (Wales)	P–P	(Scotland) Edinburgh
	Postponed due to a waterlogged pitch.

Rodney Parade
Referee: Alain Rolland (IRFU)

===== Round 14 =====
15 February 2014
17:00

Connacht (Ireland)	11–7	(Scotland) Edinburgh (1 BP)
Try: Swift 47' m Pen: Ronaldson (1/4) 20'; Parks (1/1) 68'	Report	Try: Grant 7' c Con: Bezuidenhout (1/1)

Galway Sportsgrounds
Attendance: 4,038
Referee: Claudio Blessano (FIR)

===== Round 15 =====
22 February 2014
14:30

Scarlets (Wales)	25–21	(Scotland) Edinburgh (1 BP)
Try: J. Williams (2) 32' c, 39' m Warren 58' c Con: A. Thomas (2/3); Pen: A. Thomas (2/2) 16', 22'	Report	Try: De Luca 4' c Brown 45' m Con: Bezuidenhout (1/1); Pen: Bezuidenhout (2/2) 12', 33'; Cuthbert (1/1) 62'

Parc y Scarlets
Attendance: 5,675
Referee: Marius Mitrea (FIR)

===== Round 16 =====
28 February 2014
19:35

Edinburgh (Scotland)	31–25	(Wales) Ospreys (1 BP)
Try: Hart (2) 12' c, 34' c Beard 25' m Con: Bezuidenhout (2/3); Pen: Bezuidenhout (4/4) 16', 58', 70', 77'	Report	Try: Hassler (2) 6' m, 61' m Pen: Biggar (5/5) 30', 38', 46', 55', 79'

Meggetland
Attendance: 3,000
Referee: Peter Fitzgibbon (IRFU)

===== Round 17 =====
21 March 2014
19:45

(1 BP) Edinburgh (Scotland)	3–9	(Ireland) Ulster
Pen: Bezuidenhout (1/2) 14'	Report	Pen: Jackson (3/4) 24', 36', 46'

Murrayfield Stadium
Attendance: 6,333
Referee: John Lacey (IRFU)

===== Round 18 =====
29 March 2014
19:00

Benetton Treviso (Italy)	20–16	(Scotland) Edinburgh (1 BP)
Try: Ghiraldini 61' c De Marchi 65' c Con: Botes (2/2); Pen: Botes (2/2) 13', 45'	Report	Try: du Preez 80' c Con: Bezuidenhout (1/1); Pen: Bezuidenhout (3/4) 25', 32', 37'

Stadio Comunale di Monigo
Attendance: 3,160
Referee: Nigel Owens (WRU)

===== Round 13 rescheduled match =====
3 April 2014
18:30

(1 BP) Newport Gwent Dragons (Wales)	19–23	(Scotland) Edinburgh
Try: Wardle 73' c Con: Tovey (1/1); Pen: Tovey (4/4) 14', 33', 40', 48'	Report	Try: Nel 38' c Scott 50' c Con: Cuthbert (2/2); Pen: Cuthbert (3/4) 36', 67', 70'

Rodney Parade
Attendance: 4,574
Referee: Leo Colgan (IRFU)

This match – originally scheduled to be held during Round 13, on 9 February 2014 – was postponed due to a waterlogged pitch.

===== Round 19 =====
11 April 2014
19:45

(1 BP) Edinburgh (Scotland)	22–29	(Wales) Cardiff Blues (1 BP)
Try: Scott 10' c Brown 47' c du Preez 80' m Con: Cuthbert (2/3); Pen: Cuthbert (1/1) 5'	Report	Try: Allen (2) 19' c, 35' c Fish 42' c Hewitt 75' m Con: G. Davies (3/4); Pen: G. Davies (1/1) 4'

Meggetland
Attendance: 3,700
Referee: Dudley Phillips (IRFU)

===== Round 20 =====
19 April 2014
15:30

Zebre (Italy)	26–13	(Scotland) Edinburgh
Try: Venditti 16' m Cristiano 52' m Ratuvou 77' c Con: Orquera (1/3); Pen: Orquera (1/1) 8'; Garcia (2/2) 28', 40'	Report	Try: Scott 45' c Con: Cuthbert (1/1); Pen: Bezuidenhout (2/3) 2', 33'

Stadio XXV Aprile
Attendance: 1,866
Referee: Peter Fitzgibbon (IRFU)

===== Round 12 rescheduled match =====
26 April 2014
19:05

(1 BP) Glasgow Warriors (Scotland)	37–34	(Scotland) Edinburgh (2 BP)
Try: Murchie (2) 8' m, 49' c Jackson 22' m Bennett 40' c Harley 76' c Con: Russell (3/5); Pen: Russell (2/3) 4', 12'	Report	Try: Nel 15' c Scott 58' c Visser (2) 79' c, 80' c Con: Laidlaw (4/4); Pen: Laidlaw (2/3) 21', 36'

Scotstoun Stadium
Attendance: 8,855
Referee: Mathieu Raynal (FFR)

This match – originally scheduled to be held during Round 12, on 1 January 2014 – was postponed due to a waterlogged pitch.

===== Round 21 =====
3 May 2014
17:00

Edinburgh (Scotland)	12–55	(Ireland) Munster (1 BP)
Try: Bezuidenhout 9' m Nel 22' c Con: Laidlaw (1/2)	Report	Try: Conway 16' c D. Hurley 40' c Varley 49' c penalty try (2) 55' c, 73' c Williams 66' c O'Donnell 80' c Con: Hanrahan (5/5); Murray (2/2); Pen: Hanrahan (2/2) 15', 27'

Meggetland
Attendance: 3,782
Referee: Marius Mitrea (FIR)

===== Round 22 =====
10 May 2014
18:30

Leinster (Ireland)	15–13	(Scotland) Edinburgh (1 BP)
Try: Murphy 10' m D. Kearney 57' c Con: Gopperth (1/2); Pen: Gopperth (1/1) 51'	Report	Try: Visser 66' c Con: Laidlaw (1/1); Pen: Laidlaw (2/2) 6', 40'

RDS Arena
Attendance: 17,900
Referee: Leighton Hodges (WRU)

=== Heineken Cup ===
==== Table ====
Team	P	W	D	L	PF	PA	Diff	TF	TA	TB	LB	Pts
(Ireland) Munster (4)	6	5	0	1	161	77	+84	19	6	2	1	23
(England) Gloucester (7C)	6	3	0	3	113	114	−1	13	10	1	1	14
(Scotland) Edinburgh	6	3	0	3	104	141	−37	10	17	0	0	12
(France) Perpignan	6	1	0	5	112	158	−46	10	19	1	2	7
Source : www.ercrugby.com Points breakdown: *4 points for a win *2 points for a draw *1 bonus point for a loss by seven points or less *1 bonus point for scoring four or more tries in a match

==== Results ====
===== Round 1 =====
12 October 2013
13:35

Edinburgh (Scotland)	29–23	(Ireland) Munster (1 BP)
Try: Scott 5' c T. Visser 68' c Con: Laidlaw (2/2); Pen: Laidlaw (5/6) 11', 21', 28', 33', 75'	Report	Try: Laulala 19' c Sherry 25' c Con: Keatley (2/2); Pen: Keatley (3/3) 15', 52', 64'

Murrayfield
Attendance: 7,024
Referee: JP Doyle (RFU)

===== Round 2 =====
20 October 2013
13:45

(1 BP) Perpignan (France)	31–14	(Scotland) Edinburgh
Try: Michel 43' c Mjekevu (2) 47' c, 63' c Purll 60' c Con: Hook (4/4); Pen: Hook (1/1) 11'	Report	Try: T. Visser 38' c du Preez 76' c Con: Laidlaw (2/2)

Stade Aimé Giral
Attendance: 10,073
Referee: Marius Mitrea (FIR)

===== Round 3 =====
8 December 2013
13:00

Edinburgh (Scotland)	12–23	(England) Gloucester
Try: Tonks 6' m Denton 51' c Con: Laidlaw (1/2)	Report	Try: Cook 10' m M. Thomas (2) 17' c, 45' m Con: F. Burns (1/3); Pen: F. Burns (2/3) 15', 31'

Murrayfield
Attendance: 5,417
Referee: Jérôme Garcès (FFR)

===== Round 4 =====
15 December 2013
15:00

(1 BP) Gloucester (England)	10–16	(Scotland) Edinburgh
Try: penalty try 34' c Con: F. Burns (1/1); Pen: F. Burns (1/2) 45'	Report	Try: Atiga 50' c Con: Cuthbert (1/1); Pen: Cuthbert (3/5) 9', 17', 39'

Kingsholm
Attendance: 10,975
Referee: Romain Poite (FFR)

===== Round 5 =====
11 January 2014
18:00

Edinburgh (Scotland)	27–16	(France) Perpignan
Try: Brown 15' c du Preez 45' c Fife 56' c Con: Laidlaw (3/3); Pen: Laidlaw (2/3) 11', 37'	Report	Try: Delonca 74' c Con: Hook (1/1); Pen: Hook (3/3) 19', 32', 42'

Murrayfield
Attendance: 5,061
Referee: Peter Fitzgibbon (IRFU)

===== Round 6 =====
19 January 2014
12:45

(1 BP) Munster (Ireland)	38–6	(Scotland) Edinburgh
Try: Coughlan 7' m Murphy 21' c Murray 43' c P. O'Mahony 56' c Zebo 65' m Jones 75' c Con: Keatley (4/6)	Report	Pen: Laidlaw (2/3) 6', 27'

Thomond Park
Attendance: 25,600
Referee: Wayne Barnes (RFU)
