= Akeley Wood School =

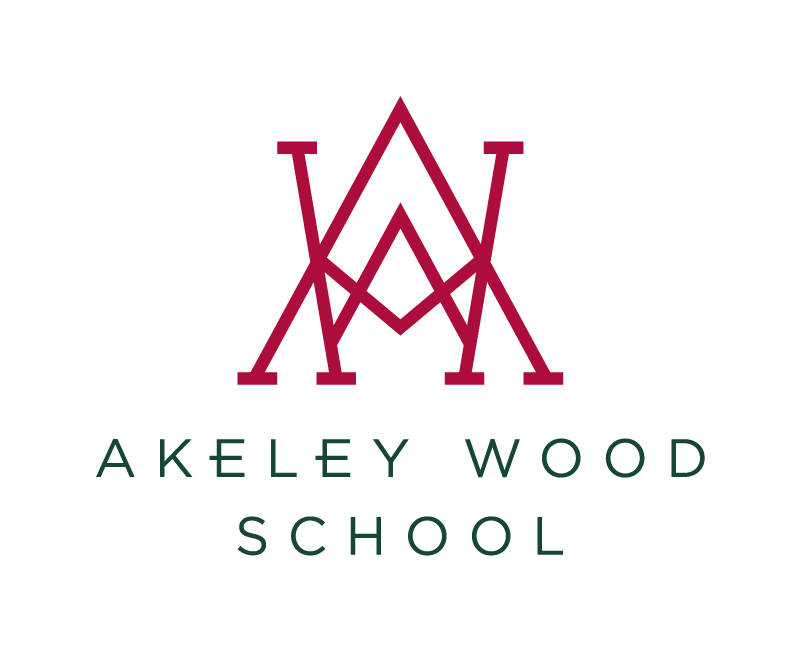
- Buckingham, Buckinghamshire, MK18 5AE; England

Information
- Type: Private day school
- Mottoes: Esto te ipsum. Ingeniose.
- Religious affiliation: Church of England
- Established: 1846
- Local authority: Buckinghamshire
- Department for Education URN: 110536 Tables
- Headteacher: Head of Junior School - Leanne Brydon Head of Senior school & AW6 Sixth Form - Jonathan Stevens
- Staff: 193
- Gender: Mixed
- Age range: 12 months to 18 years
- Enrolment: 970
- Average class size: 12
- Campus size: 267 Acres
- Houses: 4 Sports Houses known as Thompson, Pilgrim, Stuart and Hillcrest
- Colours: Green & Red
- School fees: From £5,247 per term for Reception Entry.
- Alumni name: Old Akelians
- Website: http://www.akeleywoodschool.co.uk/

Akeley Wood School is a coeducational private primary and secondary school, with an attached sixth form near Buckingham. It is owned by Blenheim Schools Group, which is an independent schools company.

The school accommodates pupils aged 12 months –18 years across two school sites; the Junior School, Wicken and the Senior School & AW6 Sixth Form at Akeley Wood House.

== History ==
Akeley Wood School was originally named Hillcrest School, and located in Frinton-on-Sea. Hillcrest School moved, avoiding the war, to Wales; and, in 1946, to Akeley Wood, where it was renamed. In 1967 the school changed from a boy's boarding to a co-educational day school.

A junior division of the school was introduced, and in 1976 provision was also made for those pupils who wanted to remain at the school to take their Ordinary Levels (subsequently GCSEs). The school expanded in 1987 to accommodate a sixth form.

The school grew requiring a new site, and in 1988 Wicken Park was purchased to run a junior school. In 1998 Tile House Mansion was purchased and the lower school was taken off site.

The Junior School includes a nursery and provides education for boys and girls aged from 12 months to 11 years. Pupils aged 11 to 18 years attend the Senior School & AW6 Sixth Form.

In May 2013 Cognita announced plans to construct a new Sixth Form centre which was opened in September 2013. The new facilities are based in the Stable Hall and include a careers centre, seminar rooms, independent study rooms, social and recreation areas over two floors and a purpose built kitchen.

In September 2026, the AW6 Sixth Form returned to the heart of the school at Akeley Wood House.

== Notable former pupils ==
- Pamela Cookey, netball player
- Samuel Ricketts, footballer
- Tom Stephenson, rugby player
- Greig Tonks, rugby player
- Andrew Selkirk, archaeologist
- Oliver Harvey, retired professional rugby player
