= Allan Dell =

British Lions & Scotland international rugby union player

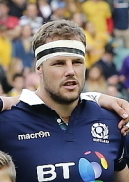
- Dell in 2017
- Born: Allan Michael Elgin Dell; 16 March 1992 (age 34) Humansdorp, South Africa
- Height: 1.86 m (6 ft 1 in)
- Weight: 111 kg (245 lb; 17 st 7 lb)
- School: Queen's College

Rugby union career
- Position: Loosehead Prop
Youth career
- -: Border Bulldogs
- –: Sharks
Senior career
Years	Team	Apps	(Points)
2014–19	Edinburgh	84	(20)
2019–22	London Irish	26	(0)
2022-24	Glasgow Warriors	12	(5)
Provincial / State sides
Years	Team	Apps	(Points)
2012–14	Sharks (Currie Cup)	11	((0))
International career
Years	Team	Apps	(Points)
2012	South Africa U20	4	(0)
2016–22	Scotland	34	(5)
2017	British & Irish Lions	0	(0)
- Correct as of 7 September 2021

Allan Dell (born 16 March 1992) is a Scotland international rugby union player. He played for Glasgow Warriors. He previously played for Edinburgh Rugby and London Irish. His usual position is prop.

== Rugby Union career ==
=== Professional career ===
At early level, he played for the Border Bulldogs, from Under-13 level to Under-18 level. In 2011, he moved to the Sharks, where he played in their Under-19 team.

He made his debut in the 2012 Vodacom Cup game against Western Province. He made his Currie Cup debut in the same season against Free State Cheetahs.

Dell signed for Edinburgh for the 2014–15 season.

On 15 January 2019, it was announced that Dell would leave Edinburgh and join London Irish from the 2019–20 season.

He signed with Glasgow Warriors on 15 July 2022. A former Edinburgh player, Dell has experience of playing against the Warriors in the 1872 Cup. On his signing he stated:

It'll be nice to have the fans on my side, too! The crowd always gets stuck into you as the opposition and always get right behind their team, it's a brilliant atmosphere. I can't wait to be a part of it and get this club back to where it should be.

He made his competitive debut for Glasgow Warriors on 25 February 2023, coming off the bench in the match against the Lions in the United Rugby Championship. Dell earned the Glasgow Warrior No. 352.

On 23 December 2024 it was announced that Dell would leave Glasgow Warriors with immediate effect to pursue new career opportunities.

=== International career ===
Dell qualifies for Scotland through his grandmother, Joan Carmichael, who was born in Paisley and brought up in Edinburgh.

He was a member of the victorious South Africa Under-20 team at the 2012 IRB Junior World Championship, including playing in the final against New Zealand Under-20.

Dell was called up to the senior Scotland squad by Vern Cotter in October 2016. He earned his first cap starting in the 2016 Autumn Internationals series against Australia.

Dell was called up to the 2017 British & Irish Lions tour to New Zealand as cover for the two final games against the provinces. He made one substitute appearance, becoming Lion number #834.
