= Chris Dean (rugby union) =

Scottish rugby union player

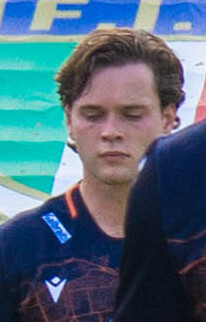
- Born: Christopher Paul Dean; 15 March 1994 (age 32)
- Height: 1.88 m (6 ft 2 in)
- Weight: 103 kg (16 st 3 lb)
- School: Law Primary School; Edinburgh Academy
- University: Edinburgh Napier

Rugby union career
- Position: Centre Flanker
- Current team: Edinburgh Rugby
Senior career
Years	Team	Apps	(Points)
2014–	Edinburgh Rugby	150	(95)
2023	→ Edinburgh 'A'	1	(0)
- Correct as of 17 April 2023
International career
Years	Team	Apps	(Points)
2014	Scotland U20	1	(5)
- Correct as of 31 May 2022
National sevens team
Years	Team		Comps
2012–2016	Scotland 7s		20 (90)

Chris Dean (born 15 March 1994) is a retired Scottish rugby union player who formerly played for Edinburgh Rugby in the United Rugby Championship.

== Background ==
Dean lifted the Brewin Dolphin Scottish Schools' Cup for Edinburgh Academy in three consecutive seasons: in 2009 (under-15) and as under-18 captain in 2010 and 2011.

He has represented Scotland at every age-grade, and skippered Scotland under-17 through the Wellington Festival in 2011, before his development was fast-tracked on a Scotland 7s elite development player contract in May 2012.

In June 2014, after two years contracted with the 7s, Chris moved on to a first team contract with Edinburgh Rugby, signed as a centre.

On 16 January 2019 Gregor Townsend named seven uncapped players, for his Scotland Six Nations squad. Dean was among those selected however injury in a League in fixture in South Africa ultimately compromised his opportunity to play in that tournament having been a 24th man earlier in the series.

In July 2024, it was announced that Dean had been released from his playing contract "by mutual agreement", allowing him to "explore opportunities both in and outwith rugby" Dean subsequently applied to and was ultimately successful in joining a Major Corporate's Eliite Athlete ( And Military Veteran) Talent Transition programme.
