= Nathan Fowles =

English rugby union player

- Born: Nathan Shane Fowles; 8 April 1993 (age 33) Rochdale, England
- Height: 1.78 m (5 ft 10 in)
- Weight: 87 kg (13 st 10 lb)

Rugby union career
- Position: Scrum-half
- Current team: Edinburgh
Senior career
Years	Team	Apps	(Points)
2011–2015	Sale Sharks	26	(5)
2011–2012	→ Preston Grasshoppers	19	(126)
2015	→ Edinburgh	6	(0)
2015–2019	Edinburgh	68	(43)
2019–	Ealing Trailfinders		
- Correct as of 29 March 2019
Provincial / State sides
Years	Team	Apps	(Points)
2012	→ Border Bulldogs	1	(0)
International career
Years	Team	Apps	(Points)
2012–2013	England U20	2	(0)
- Correct as of 25 October 2014

Nathan Shane Fowles (born 8 April 1993 in Rochdale, England) is a professional rugby union player who plays Scrum-half for Ealing Trailfinders in the English RFU Championship.

== Club career ==
Fowles progressed through the Sale Sharks academy and made his first ten appearances for the club while still a teenager. While on loan to Preston Grasshoppers during the 2011–12 season, he was named in the National League 2 North Team of the Year. He subsequently spent the summer of 2012 at Border Bulldogs competing in the under-21 Currie Cup. In March 2013, Fowles scored the winning try against Saracens in the semi-final of the Anglo-Welsh Cup. He started the defeat against Harlequin F.C. in the final.

In February 2015, Fowles joined Edinburgh on loan. In April 2015 the deal was made permanent. In May 2015, Fowles was an unused substitute in the final of the European Challenge Cup against Gloucester.

It was confirmed in March 2019 that Fowles would be leaving Edinburgh at the end of the season to join RFU Championship side Ealing Trailfinders on a two-year deal.

== International career ==
Fowles represented England under-20 in the 2013 Six Nations Under 20s Championship. In October 2016, Fowles received his first call up to the senior Scotland squad by coach Gregor Townsend for the Autumn Internationals. He is Scottish qualified through his Edinburgh born grandfather.
