= Wicus Blaauw =

Namibian rugby union player

- Born: Johannes Lodewicus Blaauw; 8 April 1986 (age 40) Windhoek, Namibia
- Height: 1.90 m (6 ft 3 in)
- Weight: 120 kg (18 st 13 lb; 265 lb)
- School: Upington High School

Rugby union career
- Position: Loosehead Prop
Senior career
Years	Team	Apps	(Points)
2012–2013	Biarritz Olympique	15	(0)
2013–2015	Edinburgh	23	(0)
- Correct as of 13 May 2014
Provincial / State sides
Years	Team	Apps	(Points)
2007	Leopards	6	(5) 1t)
2008–2012	W. Province	51	(0)
- Correct as of 18 May 2012
Super Rugby
Years	Team	Apps	(Points)
2009–2012	Stormers	33	(0)
- Correct as of 17 April 2012

Wicus Blaauw (born 8 April 1986) is a South African rugby union footballer.

He previously represented Edinburgh in the Pro12, Biarritz in the French Top 14 Championship, the Stormers in Super Rugby and Western Province in the Currie Cup and Vodacom Cup.
