= Greig Laidlaw =

British Lions & Scotland international rugby union player

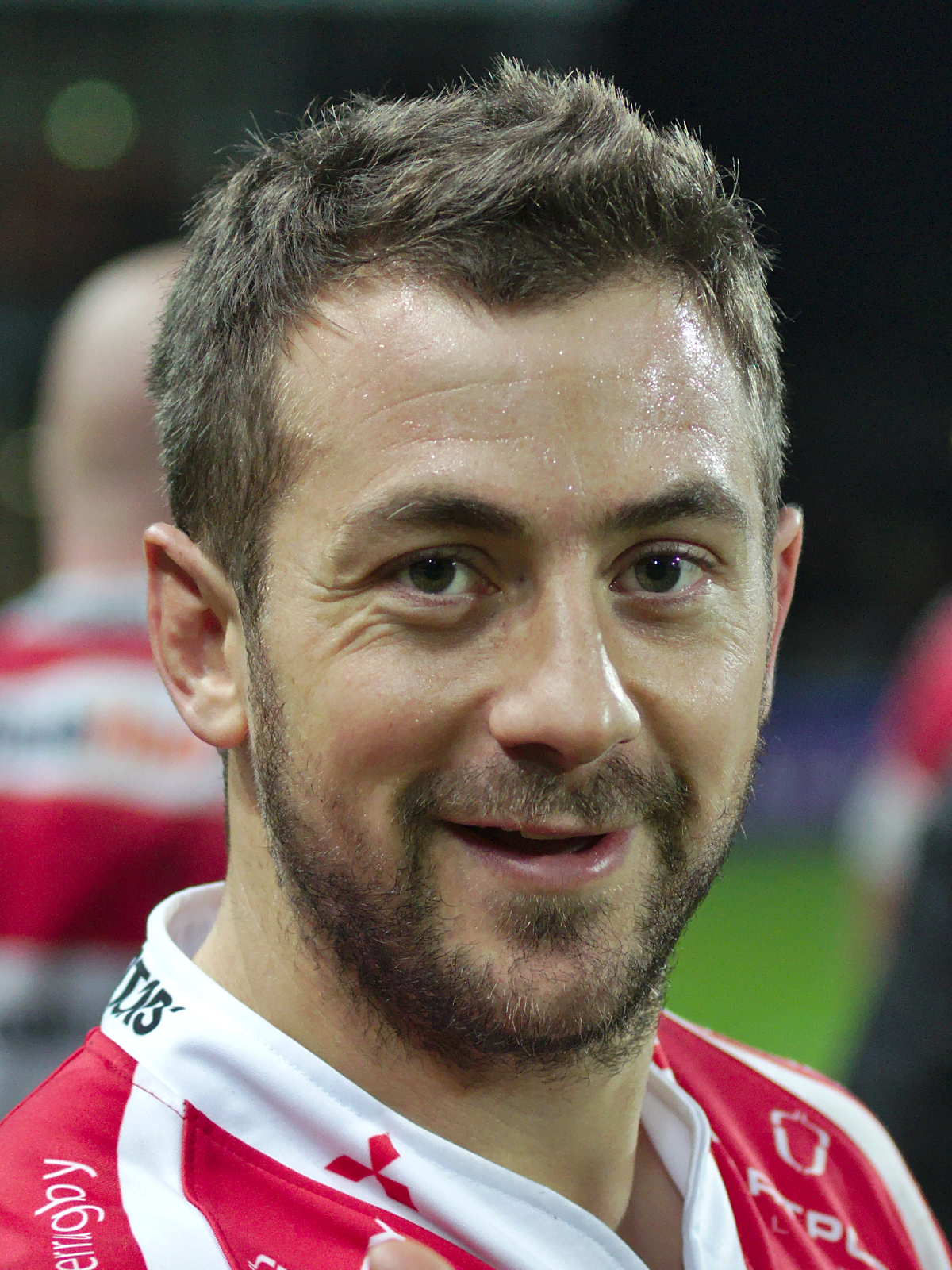
- Born: Greig David Laidlaw; 12 October 1985 (age 41) Edinburgh, Scotland
- Height: 1.76 m (5 ft 9 1/2 in)
- Weight: 80 kg (12 st 8 lb; 176 lb)
- School: Jedburgh Grammar School

Rugby union career
- Position(s): Scrum-half, Fly-Half
Senior career
Years	Team	Apps	(Points)
2007–2014	Edinburgh	137	(598)
2014–2017	Gloucester	59	(559)
2017–2020	Clermont	58	(408)
2020–2023	Shining Arcs	25	(122)
International career
Years	Team	Apps	(Points)
2004–2006	Scotland U21	14	(0)
2008–2011	Scotland A	10	(0)
2010–2019	Scotland	76	(714)
2017	British & Irish Lions	0	(0)
2018	Barbarians	1	(7)
National sevens team
Years	Team		Comps
2008–2010	Scotland		8
Coaching career
- Years: Team
- 2024–2025: Urayasu D-Rocks

Greig Laidlaw (born 12 October 1985) is a Scottish professional rugby union coach and former player who played as a scrum-half and fly-half. Laidlaw holds the record for most caps as captain, 39, of the men's Scottish national team. He also represented the British & Irish Lions in 2017.

Although Laidlaw was a scrum half, he was often used as the first-choice goal kicker by his teams. Laidlaw scored over 700 points for Scotland in his career and is one of the highest points scorers in rugby union history.

== Early life ==
A nephew of Scotland scrum half Roy Laidlaw, he joined Edinburgh in the summer of 2006. His first-team opportunities were limited at first behind Scotland scrum half Mike Blair, but in 2010 he signed a new two-year contract.

Laidlaw's earlier representative rugby included games for Borders under-16 and under-18 as well as Scotland under-18. After stints with the Scotland sevens and under-21 sides, he made his full Scotland debut against New Zealand at Murrayfield in November 2010. In January 2011, he was called up to Scotland's Six Nations squad and, although he did not get any game time, he was retained in Andy Robinson's 40-man squad ahead of the World Cup. He captained Scotland A to wins over the Ireland Wolfhounds and Italy A in early 2011, and then skippered Edinburgh in the Celtic League.

== Club career ==
On 4 March 2014 it was announced that Laidlaw would depart Murrayfield at the end of the season and join English Premiership side Gloucester.

After spending three seasons with English Premiership side Gloucester, Laidlaw would depart Kingsholm at the end of 2016–17 season and join French Top 14 side Clermont Auvergne on a three-year deal.

Laidlaw joined Japanese side Shining Arcs ahead of the 2020–21 Top League season, playing with the squad through 2023. In 2024 he was appointed head coach for the team.

== International career ==
=== Scotland ===
Laidlaw became a regular part of the Scotland team during the 2012 Six Nations, following Dan Parks' sudden retirement after the first round of the tournament. He took on the kicking duties, and in his first start against Wales he scored all of Scotland's 13 points, including a try. He remained at fly-half throughout the rest of 2012 at both international and club level, and captained Edinburgh to a semi-final appearance in that year's Heineken Cup.

The 2013 Six Nations saw Ruaridh Jackson recalled to the national side, so Laidlaw was shifted back to scrum-half while still taking Scotland's kicks. He was second-leading scorer of the season with 61 points, behind Wales' Leigh Halfpenny. He was left out of the 2013 Lions squad, instead heading to the South African Quadrangular Tournament with Scotland. He kicked a last-minute conversion against Italy to salvage something from an underwhelming tournament, giving Scotland a 30–29 victory. He continued to captain Edinburgh throughout the 2013–14 season, missing out on a place in the Amlin Challenge Cup on points difference. Laidlaw was also named as the captain of Scotland internationally in 2013, and has since captained the country 39 times, the most of any Scottish player.

Laidlaw missed the 2017 Six Nations Championship due to injury, with flanker John Barclay standing in as captain during Laidlaw's absence. Laidlaw returned to Scotland for the 2018 Six Nations Championship, retaining his place as a regular starter under new coach Gregor Townsend.

With injury to John Barclay, Laidlaw was reinstated as the Scottish Captain during the 2018 end-of-year rugby union internationals.

After 9 years playing for and captaining the national side Laidlaw retired from international rugby in December 2019. Laidlaw's 714 points in 76 test matches places him second on the Scotland all-time points list behind Chris Paterson.

=== British & Irish Lions ===
On 6 May 2017, Laidlaw was called up to 2017 British & Irish Lions tour to New Zealand as England international Ben Youngs withdrew from the tour party due to family reasons.

=== Barbarians ===
In 2018, Greig Laidlaw was capped with the Barbarians against England during the mid-year rugby tests. He scored a conversion and a try, helping his team beat England 45–63 at Twickenham.
