= Mike Coman =

- Born: Michael Coman; 28 September 1987 (age 39) Nelson, New Zealand
- Height: 1.92 m (6 ft 3 1/2 in)
- Weight: 108 kg (238 lb)
- School: Waimea College

Rugby union career
- Position: Loose forward
Senior career
Years	Team	Apps	(Points)
2013–2016	Edinburgh	32	(5)
2016–	London Irish		
- Correct as of 27 June 2015
Provincial / State sides
Years	Team	Apps	(Points)
2009	Canterbury	2	(0)
2010–2013	Hawke's Bay	38	(5)
Super Rugby
Years	Team	Apps	(Points)
2012	Hurricanes	1	(0)
- Correct as of 23 December 2014

Mike Coman (born 28 September 1987) is a former New Zealand rugby union footballer who played as loose forward (back row) for London Irish in the Aviva Premiership. He has been involved in the Hurricanes Wider Training Group in both the 2012 and 2013 Super Rugby seasons.

== Early life ==
Born in Richmond, New Zealand, Coman was educated at Waimea College, where he captained the 1st XV. Coman was a member of the New Zealand schoolboys team and also represented New Zealand U21 team.

== Career ==
Having previously played in his homeland for Hawke's Bay Magpies in the ITM Cup, Coman moved to Scotland upon signing for Edinburgh Rugby in September 2013, and made his debut with a brief appearance from the replacements' bench during the home Boxing Day defeat to Glasgow Warriors.

With Edinburgh's captain Greig Laidlaw on international duty during the 2014 Six Nations Championship, Coman captained the side during their ongoing Pro12 campaign, with his first victory as skipper coming in the win over Ospreys on 28 February. Laidlaw left the side in summer 2014, and Coman was named as skipper on a permanent basis ahead of the 2014–15 season.

Coman's first points for the club came courtesy of a try during December 2014's 48–0 demolition of Pro12 opponents Benetton Treviso.

After big improvements to Edinburgh's form in 2014–15, during which he led the team to the final of the European Rugby Challenge Cup, Coman signed a contract extension which will see him remain in the Scottish capital until at least the end of the 2015–16 season.

Coman then moved onto London Irish at the conclusion of the 2015/2016 season. Coman played two seasons for the Exiles taking home player of the season in his first year with the club. A hamstring injury in 2018 forced him to retire from professional rugby.

== Personal life ==
Coman's Father Gordon Coman played number eight for Nelson Bays and his elder brother Ben Coman played for both Tasman and Buller. Coman was married in Hawke's bay in 2017 and has a son and two twin daughters
