= Cornell du Preez =

Scotland international rugby union player

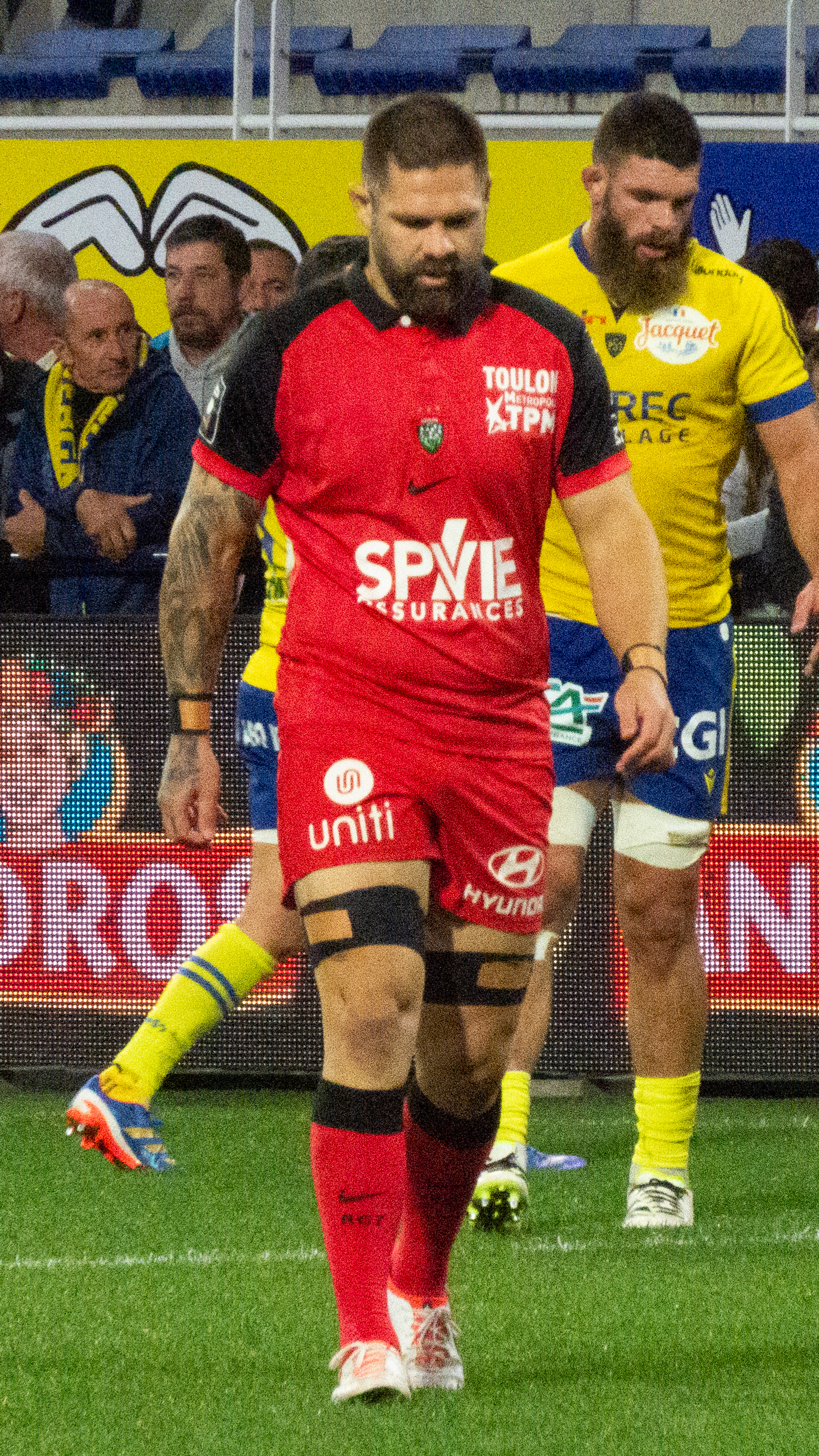
- Born: Cornell Gerhard du Preez; 23 March 1991 (age 35) Port Elizabeth, South Africa
- Height: 1.93 m (6 ft 4 in)
- Weight: 115 kg (254 lb; 18 st 2 lb)
- School: Framesby High School
- University: North West University
- Occupation: Professional rugby union player

Rugby union career
- Position: Loose forward
Youth career
- -: Leopards, S.A. Academy
Amateur team(s)
| Years | Team | Apps | (Points) |
| 2011 | NWU Pukke | 5 | (0) |
| – | Edinburgh Academicals | | |
| – | Heriots | | |
Senior career
| Years | Team | Apps | (Points) |
| 2013–2018 | Edinburgh | 105 | (75) |
| 2018–2021 | Worcester Warriors | 31 | (10) |
| 2021–2024 | Toulon | 49 | (15) |
| 2024– | Biarritz | | |
- Correct as of 1 November 2021
Provincial / State sides
| Years | Team | Apps | (Points) |
| 2012–2013 | Eastern Province Elephants | 23 | (55) |
Super Rugby
| Years | Team | Apps | (Points) |
| 2013 | Southern Kings | 16 | (15) |
International career
| Years | Team | Apps | (Points) |
| 2011 | South Africa U20 | 5 | (5) |
| 2017–2020 | Scotland | 9 | (0) |
- Correct as of 1 November 2021

Cornell du Preez (born 23 March 1991) is a South African-born Scottish rugby union player. He currently plays as a loose forward for Toulon in the Top 14 and represented Scotland internationally.

== Rugby union career ==
=== Early life ===
Born in Port Elizabeth, South Africa, du Preez attended North-West University in Potchefstroom, where he played in the Varsity Cup for NWU Pukke. He represented the Leopards in the Under-19 and Under-21 Provincial Championship competitions and was named in the Leopards squad for 2011, without making an appearance.

=== Professional career ===
Du Preez joined the Eastern Province Kings on 1 November 2011, where he signed a two-year deal. He was also named in the Southern Kings squad for the 2013 Super Rugby season. He was released during the 2013 Currie Cup First Division season to join Alan Solomons at Edinburgh Rugby for the 2013–14 season. Du Preez had a successful first season at Murrayfield, racking up 23 appearances and ultimately being named 'Newcomer of the Year'. A serious leg injury sustained in October 2014 during a match against Newport Gwent Dragons saw Du Preez missing a substantial part of the 2014–2015 season. Du Preez was first assigned to Edinburgh Academicals when not in use by Edinburgh Rugby, and in 2015 was assigned to Heriots.

On 13 February 2018 it was announced that Du Preez would leave Edinburgh for English side Worcester Warriors in the Aviva Premiership ahead of the 2018-19 season.

On 16 June 2021, it was confirmed that du Preez has left Worcester to complete his move with French side Toulon in the Top 14 ahead of the 2021-22 season.

In his first season in France, he was used a great deal and established himself as a regular in the second half of the season. He played in the European Challenge finals in this role, but lost in the final with his team against the Bristol Bears. In all, he played twenty-seven games and was a regular in Toulon's third row eighteen times that season.

The following season, he retained his starting place in Toulon's starting XV and once again qualified for the Challenge Cup final with his team, this time beating Glasgow Warriors 43-19. During this season, he played twenty-three games, including only two as a substitute, and was one of the Top 14's leading tacklers of the season.

At the start of the 2023-2024 season, having reached the end of his contract at the end of the season, he is used less often and is a more regular substitute than in previous seasons.

On 9 August 2024, du Preez would join Biarritz in the second-tier Pro D2 competition from the 2024-25 season.

=== International career ===
Du Preez was part of the South Africa Under-20s team that played at the 2011 IRB Junior World Championship. However, on 13 November 2016 he was called into the Scotland squad for the Autumn International Series as an injury replacement, having qualified for Scotland through the three year residency requirement, although he didn't take part in any match. He was called up again for the 2017 Six Nations Championship, and made his debut against England at Twickenham before gaining his second test cap the following week in the final day victory over Italy. Du Preez made his first international start in November 2017, wearing the Number 8 shirt in a narrow 17-22 defeat to the All Blacks.
