= Perry Parker =

Perry-John Parker (born 25 June 1987 in Crawley, England) is a Professional Rugby player for Stade Dijonnais, Dijon, France. Parker is a second row who can play 4 or 5.

In 2012, Parker began playing for the Scottish side Edinburgh Rugby, having previously played an excellent season for Esher RFC. In the English championship.

In January 2014, Perry signed a loan deal with Ospreys. After the Ospreys, Parker played for Rotherham Titans for a season before he signed with Rugby Rovigo, Italy.

In Parker's debut season for Rugby Rovigo, he had an outstanding campaign. Rovigo finished top of the league and went on to win the final in 2015/16 season, first win in 26 years. Parker signed a contract extension to remain with Rugby Rovigo until the end of 2017/18 season.

In 2018 Parker moved to sign for Stade Dijonnais, France.
