= Fraser McKenzie =

Scottish rugby union player

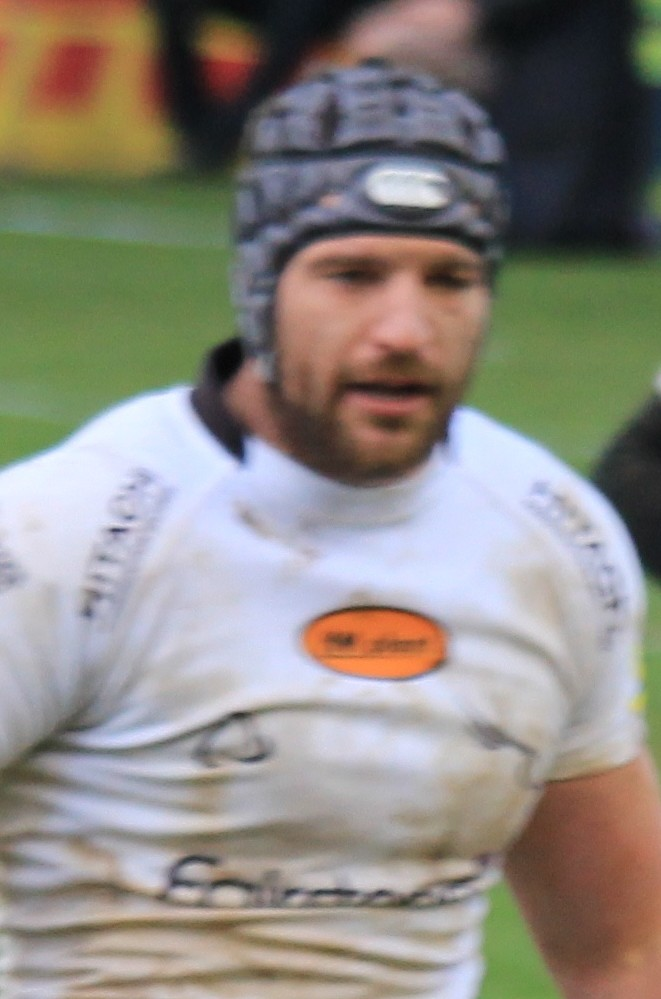
- Born: Fraser Rolland McKenzie; 28 March 1988 (age 38) Dunfermline, Scotland
- Height: 1.98 m (6 ft 6 in)
- Weight: 116.8 kg (18 st 5 lb)

Rugby union career
- Position(s): Lock, Flanker
Amateur team(s)
Years	Team	Apps	(Points)
- Dunfermline
Senior career
Years	Team	Apps	(Points)
2006–2011	Edinburgh Rugby	28	(10)
2011–2013	Sale Sharks	42	(15)
2013–2014	Newcastle Falcons	21	(5)
2014–	Edinburgh Rugby	71	(25)
2015	→ Glasgow Warriors	1	(0)
- Correct as of 17 March 2018
International career
Years	Team	Apps	(Points)
2006–2007	Scotland U19	5	(0)
2007–2008	Scotland U20	4	(0)
2009–	Scotland A	3	(0)

Fraser McKenzie (born 1988) is a Scottish professional rugby union player, who plays for Edinburgh Rugby in the Pro14.

He plays either at lock or blindside flanker and is a former Scotland under-20 captain. He started his career at Dunfermline Rugby Club and later joined Edinburgh. From the 2011–12 season until the end of 2012–13 season he played for Sale Sharks in the Aviva Premiership, and then Newcastle Falcons during the 2013–14 Aviva Premiership season.

McKenzie rejoined Edinburgh in the summer of 2014, and scored his first try of this second spell at the club in the European Rugby Challenge Cup 2014–15 quarter-final victory over London Irish.

He played one match on loan with Glasgow Warriors in the 2014–15 season and is part of the celebrated 52 players used that season when the Warriors won the Pro 12 league.

Fraser was appointed club captain of Edinburgh as of 24 October 2017.

Due to numerous shoulder injuries, Fraser announced his retirement in April 2021.

== International career ==
McKenzie was called up to the senior Scotland squad for the 2012 Six Nations Championship.
