= Nick McLennan =

New Zealand rugby union player

- Born: Nick McLennan; 23 June 1988 (age 38) Oamaru, New Zealand
- Height: 1.8 m (5 ft 11 in)
- Weight: 89 kg (196 lb)
- School: Waitaki Boys’ High School
- University: Lincoln University

Rugby union career
- Position: Stand-off/Fullback/Centre
Senior career
Years	Team	Apps	(Points)
2010	Krasny Yar		
2014–16	Edinburgh	11	(0)
2018-	Nice	12	(0)
Provincial / State sides
Years	Team	Apps	(Points)
- North Otago
2010	Canterbury		
2012–2013	Hawke's Bay		
- Correct as of 30 April 2014
- Correct as of 13 May 2014
National sevens team
Years	Team		Comps
2015–2018	Scotland 7s		96

Nick McLennan (born 23 June 1988) is a New Zealand born Rugby Union footballer who plays as Stand-off/Fullback/Centre for Edinburgh Rugby in the Pro14 and the Scotland Sevens team.

Born in New Zealand, he qualifies for Scotland through his grandmother, Jean, from Balmoral, and his grandfather, Alexander McLennan, who was from Dunblane and served with the Gordon Highlanders.

He made his Sevens début at the Dubai 7s reaching the Plate final.
