= Robin Hislop =

- Born: Robin Walter Hislop; 26 February 1992 (age 34) Dumfries, Scotland
- Height: 1.80 m (5 ft 11 in)
- Weight: 116 kg (18 st 4 lb)
- School: Langholm Academy

Rugby union career
- Position: Loosehead Prop
Amateur team(s)
Years	Team	Apps	(Points)
- Hawick Wanderers
Senior career
Years	Team	Apps	(Points)
2011–2014	Edinburgh Rugby	19	(0)
2014–2016	Rotherham Titans	61	(10)
2016–2021	Doncaster Knights	60	(15)
2020	→ Saracens	3	(0)
2021–2022	Wasps	17	(0)
2022–2023	Saracens	11	(0)
2023–	Edinburgh Rugby	5	(5)
- Correct as of 29 May 2024
International career
Years	Team	Apps	(Points)
2010–2012	Scotland U20	13	(5)
- Correct as of 9 November 2012

Robin Walter Hislop (born 26 February 1992) is a Scottish rugby union player currently playing for Edinburgh Rugby in the United Rugby Championship.

Hislop first came through the ranks at Edinburgh Rugby earning international recognition for Scotland at Under 17, 18 and 20 level, eventually going on to Captain the U20s.

In 2023, he helped Saracens win the Premiership title, featuring as a replacement in the final as Saracens defeated Sale Sharks. Hislop was sin-binned for the last few minutes of the game but this did not prevent Saracens holding on for victory.

== International career ==
Hislop was called up to the Scotland squad for the Summer internationals in June 2021.
