= Anton Bresler =

Namibian rugby union player

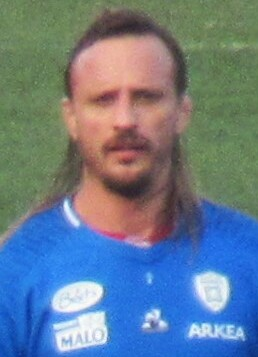
- Born: 16 February 1988 (age 38) Windhoek, Namibia
- Height: 1.98 m (6 ft 6 in)
- Weight: 114.9 kg (18 st 1 lb)
- School: Durban High School
- Notable relative: Tinus du Plessis (cousin)

Rugby union career
- Position: Lock
Senior career
Years	Team	Apps	(Points)
2014–2017	Edinburgh	55	(0)
2017–2021	Worcester Warriors	54	(0)
2021–	Racing 92	12	(0)
- Correct as of July 2017
Provincial / State sides
Years	Team	Apps	(Points)
2009–2013	Sharks (Currie Cup)	44	(5)
- Correct as of 26 October 2013
Super Rugby
Years	Team	Apps	(Points)
2011–2014	Sharks	42	(5)
- Correct as of 26 July 2014

Anton Bresler (born 16 February 1988) is a Namibian rugby union player. He plays for English side Worcester Warriors in the Aviva Premiership in the lock position, having previously played for the Sharks.

He moved to Scotland in the summer of 2014, signing for Pro12 side Edinburgh. On 28 December 2017, Bresler joined English Premiership side Worcester Warriors with immediate effect.

On 30 November 2021, Bresler left Worcester as he signed for Top 14 side Racing 92 in France with immediate effect
