= Grant Shiells =

Scottish rugby union player (born 1989)

- Born: Grant Shiells; 23 September 1989 (age 37) Melrose, Scottish Borders
- Height: 1.86 m (6 ft 1 in)
- Weight: 107 kg (16 st 12 lb)
- School: Kelso High School
- University: Napier University

Rugby union career
- Position: Prop
- Current team: Edinburgh
Amateur team(s)
Years	Team	Apps	(Points)
–2009	Kelso RFC		
Senior career
Years	Team	Apps	(Points)
2009–2014	Newcastle Falcons	80	(5)
2014	Bath	0	(0)
2014–2016	Edinburgh	12	(0)
2016–2017	London Scottish	26	(10)
Super Rugby
Years	Team	Apps	(Points)
2019-	Southern Knights		
International career
Years	Team	Apps	(Points)
2008–2009	Scotland U20	4	(0)
2013	Scotland A	1	(0)

Grant Shiells (born 23 September 1989 in Melrose, Scottish Borders) is a rugby union player for Edinburgh in the Pro14. Formerly a player at Newcastle Falcons in the Aviva Premiership, he plays as a loosehead prop.
