= John Andress =

Irish former rugby union player

- Born: 20 January 1984 (age 42) Belfast, Northern Ireland
- Height: 1.88 m (6 ft 2 in)
- Weight: 118 kg (18.6 st; 260 lb)

Rugby union career
- Position: Prop
Senior career
Years	Team	Apps	(Points)
2007–2009	Exeter	44	(25)
2009–2011	Harlequins	43	(5)
2011–2012	Exeter	18	(0)
2012–2014	Worcester Warriors	47	(0)
2014–2016	Edinburgh	53	(5)
2016	Munster	0	(0)
2016–2017	Connacht	5	(0)
- Correct as of 8 January 2016
International career
Years	Team	Apps	(Points)
2009	Ireland A	1	(0)
- Correct as of 13 February 2009

John Andress (born 20 January 1984) is an Irish former rugby union player. He played as a prop. During his career, Andress played for English sides Exeter Chiefs, Harlequins and Worcester Warriors and Scottish side Edinburgh. He returned to Ireland in 2016 to play for Munster, retiring due to a lack of game time in December of that year, but shortly after he came out of retirement to play for an injury-stricken Connacht. After this stint with the western province, Andress retired from professional rugby again.

== Early life ==
He attended Campbell College, Belfast.

== Career ==
Andress, who has played for Ireland at both A and Under-21 level, originally joined Exeter Chiefs in 2007 and made 44 appearances before moving to Harlequins in 2009 where in his first season he made 26 appearances and played in all but 1 Gallagher Premiership fixture. He returned to Exeter in 2011 and impressed as the Chiefs enjoyed another strong campaign, finishing fifth in the Aviva Premiership. Andress then joined another Aviva Premiership team, Worcester Warriors, in 2012, moving to Scottish Pro12 side Edinburgh Rugby in 2014 with Worcester Warriors being relegated.

In March 2016, it was announced that Andress would be joining Edinburgh's Pro12 rivals, Irish province Munster, for the 2016–17 season. He announced his retirement from rugby union in December 2016, having not played for Munster in his time there. Later that month however Andress joined another Irish province, Connacht, as temporary injury covery.
