= Greig Tonks =

Scotland international rugby union footballer

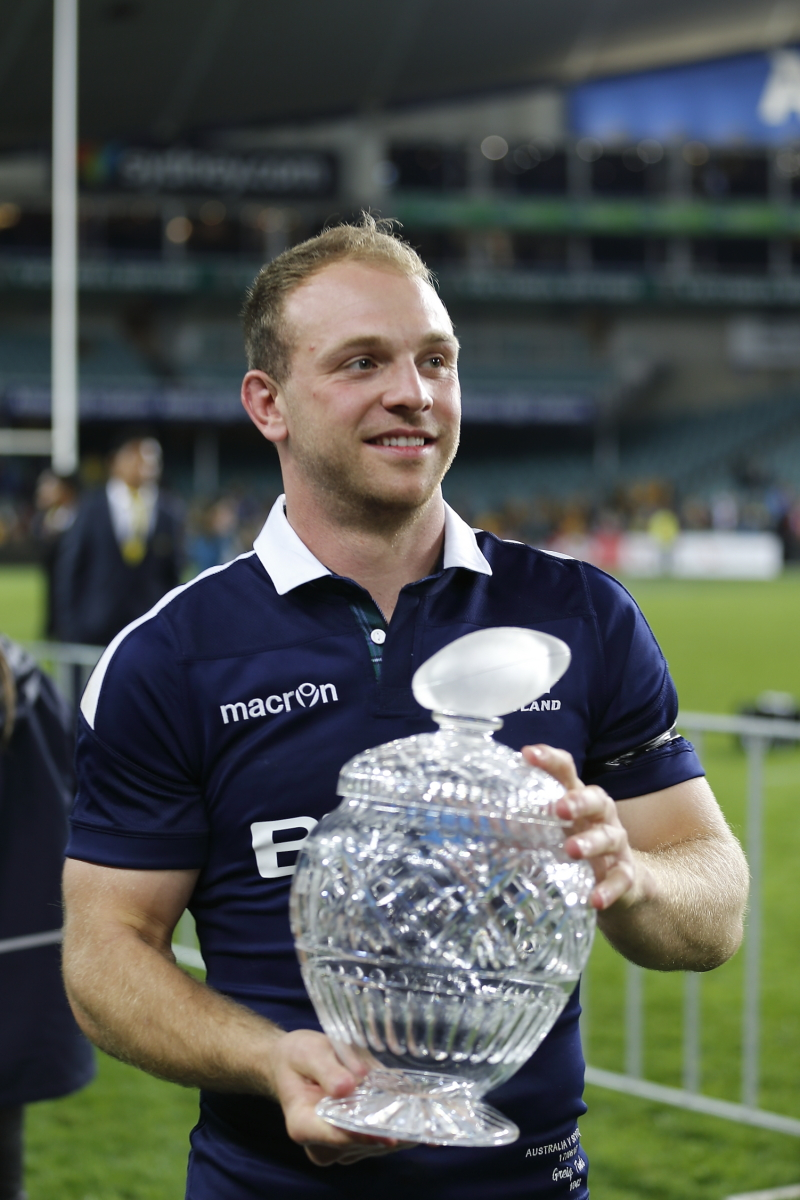
- Tonks in 2017
- Born: Greig Alexander Tonks; 20 May 1989 (age 37) Pretoria, South Africa
- Height: 1.85 m (6 ft 1 in)
- Weight: 86 kg (13 st 8 lb)
- School: Nottingham High School
- University: University of Leicester

Rugby union career
- Position(s): Fullback/Outside and Inside Centre/Fly half
- Current team: Rams
Senior career
Years	Team	Apps	(Points)
2008–2010	Leicester Tigers	1	(0)
2010–2012	Northampton Saints	12	(25)
2012–2016	Edinburgh	79	(103)
2016–2020	London Irish	14	(77)
- Correct as of 8 April 2017
International career
Years	Team	Apps	(Points)
2008–2009	England U20	9	(0)
2013–	Scotland A	1	(0)
2013–2017	Scotland	8	(3)
- Correct as of 24 June 2017

Greig Tonks (born 20 May 1989) is a Scottish former rugby union player who played for London Irish in the position of Fullback, Centre or Fly-half.

== Career ==
Born in Pretoria, South Africa, Tonks moved to England aged two. He was educated at Akeley Wood School and Nottingham High School. He played for Newark Rugby club in Nottinghamshire before being signed for Leicester Tigers and has spent long periods on loan at Nottingham Rugby.

In May 2010 it was announced that Tonks had signed for the Northampton Saints. Tonks made his debut for Northampton Saints starting their Heineken cup match against Edinburgh at fullback.

Tonks agreed a move to Edinburgh on 28 February 2012, and made his competitive debut against Munster in the opening game of the 2012–13 Pro12 season.

In March 2015, Tonks signed a new contract with Edinburgh, which would have seen him remain at Murrayfield until 2017. However, on 29 February 2016, it was announce that Tonks would leave Edinburgh and join London Irish with immediate effect.

In April 2017, London Irish were crowned Champions of the RFU Championship, with Tonks playing a large role in their title-winning campaign. Tonks signed a new two-year contract with the Exiles as they won promotion back to the Aviva Premiership. He retired at the end of the 2018–19 season in order to pursue a coaching role with National League 1 side Rams.

=== International career ===
Tonks is eligible to play for Scotland through his Ayrshire born mother. He made his début for Scotland A in a 13–9 victory against the Saxons on 1 February 2013 in Newcastle. The win was notable for being the A side's first ever recorded victory in England.

He made his full international debut for Scotland against Samoa in 2013, starting in the full-back position. He added to his cap collection with three appearances from the replacements' bench during the 2015 Six Nations Championship.

Tonks represented England at under-16 level and took part in the England under-18's tour of Australia. Tonks was a member of the England under-20 squad for the 2008 Six Nations Championship. Tonks also represented England at the 2009 IRB Junior World Championship.
