= Ben Toolis =

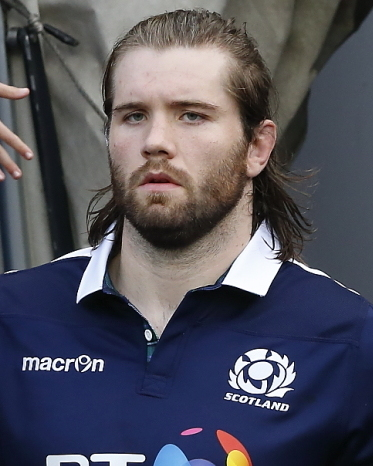
- Toolis in 2017
- Born: Ben Toolis; 31 March 1992 (age 34) Brisbane, Australia
- Height: 2.01 m (6 ft 7 in)
- Weight: 118 kg (18 st 8 lb)
- School: Marist College Ashgrove
- Notable relative: Alex Toolis (twin-brother)

Rugby union career
- Position: Lock
Amateur team(s)
Years	Team	Apps	(Points)
2010–13	GPS Old Boys	48	
Senior career
Years	Team	Apps	(Points)
2013–2022	Edinburgh Rugby	127	(25)
2014	→ London Irish	2	(0)
2022–2024	Kintetsu Liners	20	(20)
- Correct as of 5 April 2023
International career
Years	Team	Apps	(Points)
2015–2020	Scotland	30	(5)
- Correct as of 31 May 2022

Ben Toolis (born 31 March 1992) is a former Scottish rugby union player who most recently played for Kintetsu Liners in the Japan Rugby League One. Toolis represented Scotland at an international level.

== Early life ==
Born in Brisbane, Australia, he played for Australia Youth (U18) and Junior (U20) in volleyball games and had a background of rugby. Ben was in the Australian National Rugby Academy squad and played in the IRB Pacific Nations Cup with his twin brother Alex. Subsequently, he was able to make it to the Premier Grade semi-finals in 2012 and 2013, a privilege he shared with Alex.

== Professional rugby career ==
In 2013 Ben and Alex signed for Edinburgh Rugby, joining the club's Elite Development Player Programme. Coach Stevie Scott stated: "They're both very athletic and mobile, which are important attributes in the modern game."

Ben's first try for Edinburgh came during the European Challenge Cup semi-final thrashing of Newport Gwent Dragons in April 2015.

== International career ==
Although born in Australia, Toolis is eligible to represent Scotland as his mother, Linda, is from Carluke in Lanarkshire. After a good run of form for his club Toolis was called up to the Scotland squad for the 2015 Six Nations Championship, going on to make his international debut against Italy. He has subsequently played in two victories for Scotland over the country of his birth.
