= Ollie Atkins =

Australian rugby union player

Oliver Atkins
- Born: Oliver Atkins; 12 August 1988 (age 38) Hobart, Tasmania, Australia
- Height: 2.00 m (6 ft 6 1/2 in)
- Weight: 117 kg (18 st 6 lb)

Rugby union career
- Position: Lock
Senior career
Years	Team	Apps	(Points)
2012–2013	Sydney University	31	(5)
2013–2015	Edinburgh	33	(5)
2015–2019	Exeter Chiefs	57	(5)
2019–2020	Rouen	14	(5)
2020–	Gloucester	0	(0)
- Correct as of 22 April 2015
Super Rugby
Years	Team	Apps	(Points)
2012	Western Force	2	(0)
2013	Waratahs	1	(5)
2020	Western Force	6	(0)
- Correct as of 17 July 2020
International career
Years	Team	Apps	(Points)
2014	Scotland A	1	(0)

Oliver Atkins (born 12 August 1988 in Hobart, Australia) is a rugby union footballer. His regular playing position is lock.

He previously played for Aviva Premiership side Exeter, when he left Edinburgh in the summer of 2015.

He was named in the Waratahs squad for the 2013 Super Rugby season. Atkins previously made two appearances for the Western Force during the 2012 Super Rugby season.

Atkins left Exeter Chiefs after four years to join French side Rouen in the Pro D2 for the 2019–20 season. Afterwards, he returned to his home nation in Australia to rejoin Western Force for the 2020 Super Rugby AU season.

On 13 November 2020, Atkins returns to England back in the Premiership Rugby with Gloucester from the 2020–21 season.
