= Simon Berghan =

Scotland international rugby union player

- Born: 7 December 1990 (age 35) Christchurch, New Zealand
- Height: 1.93 m (6 ft 4 in)
- Weight: 126 kg (278 lb; 19 st 12 lb)
- School: Shirley Boys' High School
- University: Edinburgh Napier University

Rugby union career
- Position: Tighthead Prop
Amateur team(s)
Years	Team	Apps	(Points)
2014	Sydenham		
Senior career
Years	Team	Apps	(Points)
2014–21	Edinburgh Rugby	91	(10)
2021–23	Glasgow Warriors	33	(0)
International career
Years	Team	Apps	(Points)
2017–23	Scotland	33	(0)

Simon Berghan (born 7 December 1990) is a former Scotland international rugby union player. A prop forward, he played for Glasgow Warriors in the United Rugby Championship, having previously played for Edinburgh Rugby in the Pro14. On 18 June 2023 he announced his retirement from rugby, and he moved into working in finance with BlackRock.

== Rugby Union career ==
=== Amateur career ===
Berghan played for Sydenham in Christshurch, New Zealand. He captained the side for 2 seasons.

=== Professional career ===
Berghan earned selection for the provincial Canterbury academy, B team and Crusader Knights, the development squad of the Super Rugby side, before securing a one-year contract to play for Edinburgh.

Berghan signed for Glasgow Warriors in 2021. The move to Edinburgh's derby rivals made headlines as a 'shock switch'. Berghan said of the move:

Danny [Wilson] gave me a call and outlined what he's looking to build at Scotstoun over the next few years, and it sounds like a really exciting time to get involved with the club. Everyone talks about the culture of the club, and for my partner and I it seemed like a really sensible and exciting move. I’ve got to admit, the Scotstoun crowd is always incredible. Every time I’ve come through as an Edinburgh player the noise has been unbelievable. Players, coaches, even friends and family all talk about how incredible the atmosphere is for a Glasgow home game and I can't wait to be a part of that in the near future. I know a few of the boys from Scotland camps, but I’m also really looking forward to meeting the rest of the squad, as well as the coaches and backroom staff for the first time. The quality of the front-row players at Glasgow is unreal. With Jamie [Bhatti] coming back to Scotland next season too, you can make two, nearly three, front rows full of international players. There's going to be a lot of competition for places and a challenge I’m looking forward to. It's an exciting prospect, and I want to put my best foot forward and show what I’m all about.

Berghan made his debut for the Warriors in the pre-season 'Clash of the Warriors' fixture with Worcester on 10 September 2021. He made his competitive debut for Glasgow in the 24 September 2021 match against Ulster away at Ravenhill Stadium in the United Rugby Championship – earning the Glasgow Warrior No. 330. He made 33 appearances for the club. He was released in the summer of 2023.

=== International career ===
Berghan is eligible to represent Scotland through his grandfather, Andrew Davidson, from Stirling. He was called up to the Scotland squad for the 2017 Six Nations Championship and won his first cap, coming on as a 2nd half substitute in the match against France.

== Outside rugby union ==
Berghan is a qualified electrician and has a degree from Edinburgh Napier University. He now works for BlackRock.
