= Tom Brown (rugby union, born 1990) =

Scotland international rugby union player

- Born: Thomas Gordon Brown; 31 March 1990 (age 36) Edinburgh, Scotland
- Height: 5 ft 11 in (1.80 m)
- Weight: 88.5 kg (195 lb)
- School: Law Primary School; Edinburgh Academy
- University: Edinburgh University

Rugby union career
- Position: Full-back
Senior career
Years	Team	Apps	(Points)
2010–19	Edinburgh	116	(100)
Super Rugby
Years	Team	Apps	(Points)
2019-	Boroughmuir Bears		
International career
Years	Team	Apps	(Points)
2008–09	Scotland U20	12	(10)
2012	Scotland	1	(0)
- Correct as of 29 March 2018
National sevens team
Years	Team		Comps
2016–	Scotland 7's		15

Tom Brown (born 31 March 1990) is a Scotland and Scotland 7's international rugby union player.

== Rugby Union career ==
=== Amateur career ===
He played rugby union for his school, Edinburgh Academy; and went on a rugby-playing tour to South Africa with the school team.

=== Professional career ===
He played for Edinburgh District at age-grade.

Brown made his Edinburgh Rugby debut against Leinster at Murrayfield in September 2010, and impressed sufficiently throughout the rest of the campaign, he offered a one-year contract for the 2010–11 season at Edinburgh Rugby.

After regular and solid displays for Edinburgh, Brown was rewarded with a two-year contract extension in April 2014.

In a covid-19 hit season 2020-21 he was with the Glasgow Warriors squad. He did not manage a first team competitive game for the Warriors - but played for their 'A' side at Full-back against Edinburgh 'A' on 4 February 2021. At the end of the season, Brown was thanked in a 'leavers video' by the club for his support to the squad over the season.

=== International career ===
Brown was capped by Scotland U20 at the IRB Junior World Championship in the 2009 IRB Junior World Championship in Japan and the 2010 IRB Junior World Championship in Argentina.

Brown made the cut for Scotland's 2012 summer tour the Australia and Pacific Islands, during which he made his debut for Scotland off the bench in the historic victory against Australia.

He has been capped by Scotland 7's in the World Rugby Sevens Series.
