= James Hilterbrand =

US international rugby union player

- Born: 21 May 1989 (age 37) Adelaide, South Australia, Australia
- Height: 1.84 m (6 ft 1/2 in)
- Weight: 108 kg (238 lb; 17 st 0 lb)

Rugby union career
- Position: Hooker / Prop
Amateur team(s)
Years	Team	Apps	(Points)
2013–	Manly	69	(75)
Senior career
Years	Team	Apps	(Points)
2013–2015	Edinburgh	26	(0)
2016–2017	Sydney Rays	13	(0)
2022	San Diego Legion	0	(0)
- Correct as of 20 May 222
Super Rugby
Years	Team	Apps	(Points)
2013	Western Force	2	(0)
2016	Waratahs	1	(0)
- Correct as of 3 April 2016
International career
Years	Team	Apps	(Points)
2007	Australia U18		
2016–2019	United States	24	(0)
- Correct as of 13 October 2019

James Hilterbrand (born 21 May 1989) is an Australian-born United States international rugby union player, currently playing for New South Wales Shute Shield side Manly and the United States rugby union team. His regular position is hooker, however he can also play as a prop.

== Youth ==
Hilterbrand was born and grew up in Adelaide, South Australia, and played for South Australia at junior rugby level. He represented them at Under-16 level in 2004 and 2005, at Under-18 level in the Australian Schools Championship Division II in 2005 and 2006, and at Under-21 level in 2007.

== Playing career ==
=== Manly ===
Hilterbrand then moved to Sydney, where he joined Shute Shield side Manly for the 2008 season. He played for their Colts side in 2008, before working his way up the various grade levels, breaking into their Grade I side in 2011 as they reached the semi-final of the Shute Shield.

Hilterbrand was the regular starting hooker for Manly in the 2012 Shute Shield, helping them to second position on the ladder before they were eliminated from the competition by Southern Districts in the preliminary final. He was also selected to represent a Sydney Anchors team against NSW Country.

=== Western Force ===
Hilterbrand moved to Perth to join the Western Force on an Extended Playing Squad contract for the 2013 Super Rugby season. He was named on the bench for their match against the Hurricanes in Wellington, but remained unused for the match. He made his Super Rugby debut the following week, however, coming on as a late replacement in a 7–41 defeat to the Brumbies in Canberra. He was named on the bench for a further five matches in the competition, but failed to make an appearance in any of those. He featured in one more match in the competition, starting their 21–15 victory over the Brumbies in Perth.

At the conclusion of the 2013 Super Rugby season, Hilterbrand returned to Sydney to make four appearances for Manly in the 2013 Shute Shield.

=== Edinburgh ===
On 26 August 2013, Scottish Pro12 side Edinburgh confirmed that Hilterbrand joined them on a two-year contract. He made his debut for Edinburgh in their 2013–14 Pro12 Round Three match against Welsh side Ospreys, coming on for the final sixteen minutes as they suffered a 10–44 loss. He made a total of thirteen appearances in the competition, starting two of those, as Edinburgh finished the competition in 8th place in the table. He also made one appearance for Edinburgh in the 2013–14 Heineken Cup in their 12–23 defeat to Gloucester.

Hilterbrand made ten appearances for Edinburgh in the 2014–15 Pro12 competition, as they matched their 2013–14 performance by finishing in eighth position in the table. He also made appearances against Lyon and London Welsh in the 2014–15 European Rugby Challenge Cup, in which Edinburgh finished top of their group.

Hilterbrand left the Scottish club at the end of the 2014–15 season and returned to Australia to once again represent Manly in the Shute Shield competition, making nine appearances. He returned to Edinburgh on a temporary contract as cover during the 2015 Rugby World Cup; however, he failed to make any competitive appearances for the side. He was also named in the North Harbour Rays squad for the 2015 National Rugby Championship, but failed to feature in the competition.

=== Kings ===
In November 2015, it was announced that Hilterbrand was one of South African Super Rugby side the Southern Kings' new acquisitions prior to the 2016 Super Rugby season.

== International ==
Hilterbrand was born in Australia and represented their Under-18 team in 2007. In addition, he was also eligible to represent Scotland and the United States.

In February 2016, United States head coach John Mitchell included Hilterbrand as a reserve in the matchday squad for their opening match of the 2016 Americas Rugby Championship against Argentina, but he failed to make an appearance in the match. He made his international debut off the bench against Canada the following week. Hilterbrand retired from international rugby following the 2019 Rugby World Cup
