= Joaquín Domínguez =

Joaquin María Dominguez
- Born: 13 March 1987 (age 39)
- Height: 190 cm (6 ft 3 in)
- Weight: 94 kg (14 st 11 lb)

Rugby union career
- Position: Winger
Senior career
Years	Team	Apps	(Points)
2009-13	San Isidro Club	63	(0)
2013-15	Edinburgh	13	(199)
2015-2016	US Cognac		
2016-17	CR Cisneros		
2017-2018	San Isidro Club		
- Correct as of 17 Aug 2023
International career
Years	Team	Apps	(Points)
2005-06	Argentina under 19 squad	3	(0)
- Correct as of 24 November 2013

Joaquin María Dominguez (born 13 March 1987), is an Argentine professional rugby union player.

He initially joined the Murrayfield team on a trial basis in September 2013, before putting pen to paper on a contract running until summer 2013, after impressing Head Coach Alan Solomons.

== Early years ==
Dominguez featured in Argentina's under 19 squad that competed in the 2006 World Championship in Dubai, with highlights coming in victories against both England and South Africa.
