= Dougie Fife =

Scotland international rugby union player (born 1990)

- Full name: Douglas James Fife
- Born: 8 August 1990 (age 36) Edinburgh, Scotland
- Height: 1.85 m (6 ft 1 in)
- Weight: 90 kg (14 st 2 lb; 198 lb)
- School: Firrhill High School
- University: Telford College

Rugby union career
- Position: Centre / Wing/ fullback
Youth career
- 1997-2008: Boroughmuir
Amateur team(s)
Years	Team	Apps	(Points)
2025	Mystic River Rugby Club		
Senior career
Years	Team	Apps	(Points)
2011–2019	Edinburgh Rugby	123	(130)
2021–2022	New England Free Jacks	29	(55)
2023-	New Orleans Gold		
- Correct as of 17 February 2023
International career
Years	Team	Apps	(Points)
2009–2010	Scotland U20	9	(10)
2014–2018	Scotland	8	(15)
2016–2020	Scotland 7s	82	(135)
- Correct as of 24 February 2021

Dougie Fife (born 8 August 1990) is a Scottish rugby union player who currently plays for the New Orleans Gold of Major League Rugby (MLR). He previously played for Edinburgh Rugby and the New England Free Jacks.

== Career ==
He has represented Scotland at the under-17, under-19 and under-20 age groups, as well as in the IRB Sevens World Series. Fife spent most of the 2010–11 season with the Scotland Sevens team.

Fife received his first full international call-up on 15 January 2014, when he was named in Scotland's 36-man training squad ahead of the 2014 Six Nations Championship by Head Coach Scott Johnson. His first international try came during a narrow defeat to France on the opening weekend of the 2015 Six Nations Championship.

At the end of the 2015–16 season Fife left Edinburgh Rugby for the Scotland 7s team before rejoining for the 2017–18 season. He was called up to Scotland's 2018 summer tour of the Americas, scoring tries in both appearances (against the US and Argentina).

Fife signed a two-year contract with the US Major League Rugby team New England Free Jacks in August 2020. He started 29 games over two seasons and led the Free Jacks to a first-place divisional finish and playoff appearance in 2022. In September 2022 the New Orleans Gold announced they had signed Fife to a two-year contract. He currently plays fullback for the team.
