= Sam Beard =

- Born: Samuel Thomas Beard; 3 May 1990 (age 36) Timaru, New Zealand
- Height: 1.83 m (6 ft 0 in)
- Weight: 93 kg (14 st 9 lb)

Rugby union career
- Position: Centre
Senior career
Years	Team	Apps	(Points)
2011	South Canterbury	9	(15)
2013	Bay of Plenty	8	(0)
2013–2016	Edinburgh	41	(10)
2016–2018	Dragons	34	(25)
2018	Crusaders	2	(0)
2018	Canterbury	12	(5)
2020	New England Free Jacks	5	
- Correct as of 12 November 2019

Sam Beard (born 3 May 1990 in Timaru, New Zealand) is a rugby union footballer. His regular playing position is Centre.

== Career ==
Beard moved to Christchurch as a young player to pursue a career in rugby and kicked off matters in earnest with Burnside's championship-winning team.

He was then called up to the provincial Canterbury B team and, after an impressive season in which he was named player of the year, was brought into the Crusader Knights, the development squad of Super Rugby giants Crusaders.

Bay of Plenty then offered the midfielder the next step on the provincial ladder, where he played out his first season before being approached in 2013 to join Edinburgh in Scotland.

Having made his initial appearances for the team from the replacements' bench, Beard started a match for the first time on 28 February 2014, during which he ran in Edinburgh's second try in a victory over Ospreys.

Beard was contracted to Edinburgh until 2016, having signed a contract extension at the end of his first season with the club. On 22 February 2016, Beard signed a two-year deal with Welsh region the Dragons from the 2016–17 season. He was released by the Dragons at the end of the 2017–18 season.

== Rugby Statistics ==
As of 28 June 2015

Season	Team	Games	Starts	Sub	Mins	Tries	Cons	Pens	Drops	Points	Yel	Red
2015–16	Edinburgh	2	2	0	121	1	0	0	0	5	0	0
2014–15	Edinburgh	20	16	4	1237	0	0	0	0	0	0	0
2013–14	Edinburgh	13	4	9	468	1	0	0	0	5	0	0
Total		35	22	13	1826	2	0	0	0	10	0	0
