= WP Nel =

Scotland international rugby union player

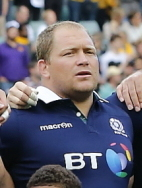
- Nel representing Scotland during the Summer Internationals
- Full name: Willem Petrus Nel
- Born: 30 April 1986 (age 40) Loeriesfontein, South Africa
- Height: 1.80 m (5 ft 11 in)
- Weight: 114 kg (251 lb; 17 st 13 lb)
- School: Drostdy THS

Rugby union career
- Position: Prop
- Current team: Stirling County
Senior career
Years	Team	Apps	(Points)
2008	Western Province	4	(0)
2009	Boland	10	(5)
2009–2012	Free State Cheetahs	46	(60)
2009–2012	Cheetahs	47	(45)
2012–2024	Edinburgh Rugby	206	(125)
- Correct as of 27 June 2024
International career
Years	Team	Apps	(Points)
2015–2023	Scotland	61	(15)
- Correct as of 27 June 2024

Willem Petrus Nel (born 30 April 1986) is a South African-born Scottish former professional rugby union player.

== Professional career ==
Nel joined Scottish Pro 12 side Edinburgh in July 2012.

After three years at Murrayfield Stadium, Nel became eligible to represent Scotland in June 2015, and claimed he would decline an invitation to represent his native Springboks in order to do so. He made his international bow against Italy during the 2015 summer Tests, and was subsequently named in the final 31-man squad for the 2015 Rugby World Cup.

He scored his first international try in the 39–16 World Cup match against the USA.

Nel played in all of Scotland's matches in the 2016 Six Nations but missed the 2016 Autumn Internationals and the entire 2017 Six Nations due to a neck injury. This injury probably cost him a place in the Lions touring squad to New Zealand in 2017.

In March 2017 it was announced that Nel had signed a three-year extension to his contract with Edinburgh.

Nel played in four (starting three) of Scotland's group matches at the 2019 Rugby World Cup.

In 2023 Nel was selected in the 33 player squad for the 2023 Rugby World Cup in France, making his final appearance for Scotland in the pool stage loss against Ireland.

In March 2024, Nel announced his intention to retire from rugby at the end of the season.
