= Alex Toolis =

- Born: Alexander William Toolis; 31 March 1992 (age 34) Brisbane, Australia
- Height: 2.01 m (6 ft 7 in)
- Weight: 118 kg (18 st 8 lb)
- School: Marist College Ashgrove
- Notable relative: Ben Toolis (twin brother)

Rugby union career
- Position: Lock
Amateur team(s)
Years	Team	Apps	(Points)
2012–13	GPS Old Boys		
Senior career
Years	Team	Apps	(Points)
2013–2016	Edinburgh Rugby	27	(10)
2014	→ London Irish	1	(0)
2015	→ Glasgow Warriors	1	(0)
2016–2018	Melbourne Rebels	11	(5)
2018–2019	Kurita Water Gush	7	(0)
2019–2020	London Scottish	12	(5)
2020–2021	Blagnac	4	(0)
- Correct as of 31 May 2022

Alex Toolis (born 31 March 1992) is a retired Australian rugby union player. His twin brother, Ben, played international rugby for Scotland.

== Early life ==
Toolis was born in Brisbane, Australia.

== Rugby career ==
Toolis arrived in Edinburgh, August 2013 after competing in the Queensland Premier Rugby competition playing for GPS Old Boys, where he helped GPS reach consecutive Premier Grade finals. He was also in the ARU's National Academy where he played in the IRB Pacific Nations Cup with his twin brother, Ben. He was also selected to play for the Queensland 'A' side in the IRB Pacific Nations Cup.

In November 2013, both twins were signed by London Irish on a short-term loan from Edinburgh Rugby. Toolis made his debut on 17 November 2013 against the Northampton Saints at Madjeski Stadium in London, where he started in the second row with his brother. This was the first time that London Irish had a pair of twins starting at the lock position.

He played one match on loan with Glasgow Warriors against Munster during their Pro12 title-winning 2014–15 season.

He played alongside Ben in the second row for the first time for Edinburgh in the away win over Benetton in September 2015. They were the first brothers to do so since Tim and Sep Visser in 2012, and the first set of twins to do so for the club in the professional era. They were the first twins to start a match together for the home side in Scotland in the professional era, in January 2016 win over SU Agen Lot-et-Garonne.

Toolis signed a two-year deal for the Rebels to return to Australia for the 2017 Super Rugby season; however, he received a serious neck injury which ruled him out for a year.

Alex was forced to retire through several repeated injuries.

In Dec 2021 Alex took up the role of Academy and Performance Manager at Boroughmuir Rugby Club, in Edinburgh, Scotland, where he is responsible for driving, developing and delivery of a rugby performance programme to support youth development from Micros (Under-5s) through to Colts (U18s) and their transition to senior rugby, with an emphasis on players achieving their best, whether at club, region or national levels. In his first season the Boroughmuir U18s went on to win the Scottish National Club Cup and two of the squad, Jerry Blyth-Lafferty and Liam McConnell played for the Scotland U18s Team, with Liam also being selected as Captain, a strong start to a new career in club rugby player development.
