= Jack Cuthbert =

Scotland international rugby union player

- Born: Jack M Cuthbert; 3 September 1987 (age 39) Bristol, England
- Height: 1.96 m (6 ft 5 in)
- Weight: 105 kg (16 st 7 lb)
- School: Queen Elizabeth's Hospital
- University: University of Bath

Rugby union career
- Position: Fullback/Wing/Centre
- Current team: Scotland
Amateur team(s)
Years	Team	Apps	(Points)
1999–2005	Weston Hornets Weston-super-Mare R.F.C		
Senior career
Years	Team	Apps	(Points)
2006–2013	Bath Rugby	96	(51)
2013–2016	Edinburgh Rugby	46	(46)
2016–	Jersey Reds		
International career
Years	Team	Apps	(Points)
2006–2007	Scotland U19	7	(33)
2010	Scotland A	5	(0)
2011	Scotland	1	(0)

Jack Cuthbert (born 3 September 1987 in Bristol, England) is a Scottish rugby union player for Jersey Reds in the RFU Championship. He plays as a winger/fullback or outside centre, although most of his senior appearances have come in the number 15 jersey. He has also acted as a goal kicker on occasions.

Cuthbert joined Edinburgh from Bath in the summer of 2013.

Cuthbert made his international debut for Scotland on 6 August 2011 against Ireland at Murrayfield, coming off the bench for an injured Nikki Walker, and was also called into the squad during the 2014 Six Nations Championship.

On 4 April 2016, Cuthbert moved to the Jersey Reds in the RFU Championship to play there from the 2016–17 season.

In late 2020, Cuthbert topped a poll for the best Scottish winger of the decade by a remarkable 50% margin.
