= 2013–14 Pro12 =

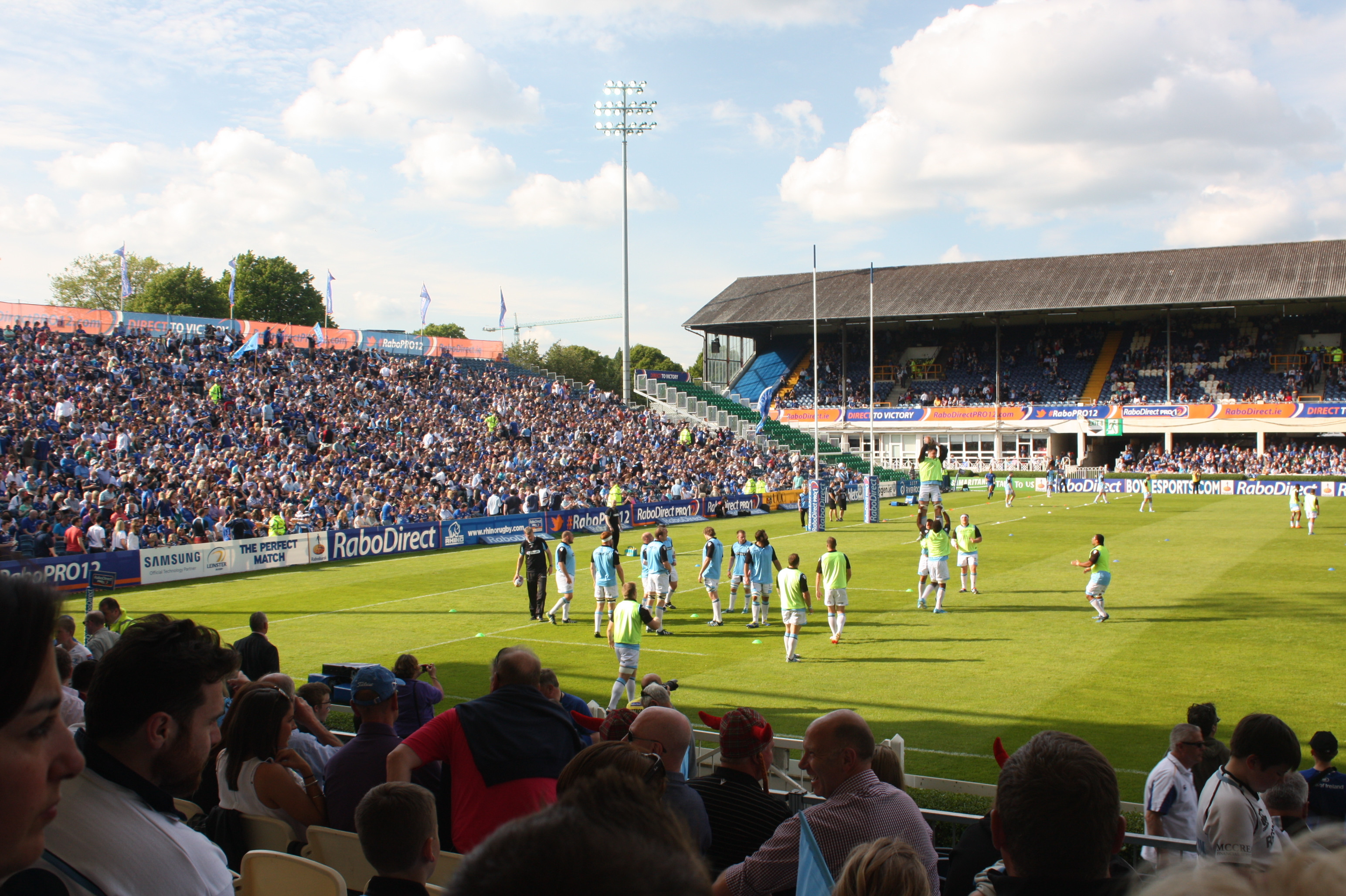
- Glasgow Warriors warming up
- Countries: Ireland; Italy; Scotland; Wales
- Date: 6 September 2013 – 31 May 2014
- Champions: (Ireland) Leinster (4th title)
- Runners-up: (Scotland) Glasgow Warriors
- Matches played: 135
- Attendance: 1,107,707 (average 8,205 per match)
- Tries scored: 531 (average 3.9 per match)
- Top point scorer: Dan Biggar (Ospreys) (219 points)
- Top try scorer: Gareth Davies (Scarlets) (10 tries)

Official website
- www.rabodirectpro12.com

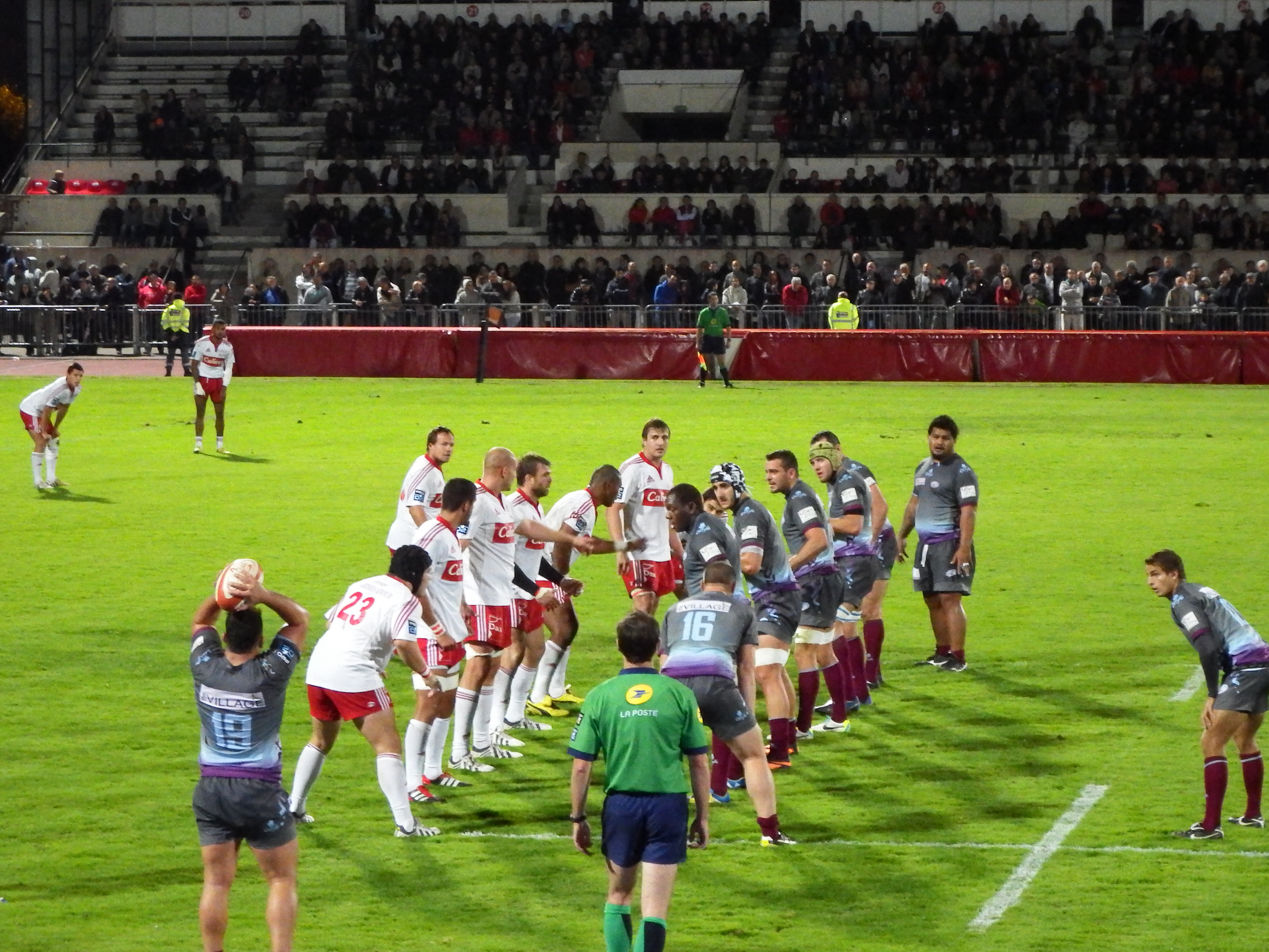
US Dax-CS Bourgoin-Jallieu 2013-10-12

The 2013–14 Pro12 (also known as the RaboDirect Pro12 for sponsorship reasons) was the 13th season of the Pro12 rugby union competition originally known as the Celtic League, the fourth with its current 12-team format, and the third with RaboDirect as title sponsor.

Leinster were the defending champions, having beaten Ulster in the 2013 playoff final.

The twelve competing teams were the four Irish teams, Connacht, Leinster, Munster and Ulster; two Scottish teams, Edinburgh and Glasgow Warriors; four Welsh teams, Cardiff Blues, Newport Gwent Dragons, Ospreys and Scarlets; and two Italian teams, Benetton Treviso and Zebre.

== Changes for the season ==
=== Ireland ===
New Zealand native Pat Lam replaced Eric Elwood as head coach of Connacht, following Elwood's decision to step down, while out-half Dan Parks took on a coaching role with Connacht U18 Schools and Clubs while continuing to play with the senior team. Following changes between captains in previous seasons the start of the season saw three players, Gavin Duffy, John Muldoon and Michael Swift, captain the side jointly. After a poor run of form culminating in a 43–10 defeat against Edinburgh, former Chiefs captain Craig Clarke was made team captain.

Following the departure of head coach Joe Schmidt, who left to take over the Irish national team, Leinster were coached by Matt O'Connor. O'Connor joined Leinster from 2012–13 Aviva Premiership winners Leicester Tigers.

Back row player, Peter O'Mahony was appointed as Munster captain following the retirement of previous captain Doug Howlett. Munster entered their first league season without long-serving out-half Ronan O'Gara, as he moved to a coaching role with Racing Métro following his retirement from playing. He left as the team's all-time leading scorer, as well as the record holder for number of appearances for the province.

=== Scotland ===
With the departure of Michael Bradley, who left the team after two seasons as coach, Edinburgh were coached by South Africa native Alan Solomons. Solomons joined the team after coming from a Director of Rugby role with South African side, the Southern Kings.

=== Wales ===
Cardiff Blues replaced the grass playing surface at their home grounds with a new artificial pitch. On 16 August 2013, hooker Matthew Rees was named as captain for the season in place of Andries Pretorius. However, Rees was later diagnosed with testicular cancer, and was forced to take a leave of absence from the game to receive treatment.

Former Ospreys and London Welsh coach Lyn Jones was appointed Director of Rugby for Newport Gwent Dragons, with former Wales captain Kingsley Jones as his assistant. Previous season's head coach Darren Edwards stays on with the club, working under Lyn Jones in the new structure. Also, after serving as skipper for the side in the 2012–13 season, Lewis Evans was replaced by Andrew Coombs as Dragons captain.

== Teams ==
Location of 2013–14 Pro12 teams in Great Britain and Ireland.	Location of 2013–14 Pro12 teams in Italy
Winners; 2nd–4th place; Other teams.

Team	Coach	Captain	Stadium	Capacity
(Italy) Benetton Treviso	(South Africa) Franco Smith	(Italy) Antonio Pavanello	Stadio Comunale di Monigo	6,700
(Wales) Cardiff Blues	(Wales) Phil Davies	(Wales) Matthew Rees	Cardiff Arms Park	12,500
(Ireland) Connacht	(Samoa) Pat Lam	(New Zealand) Craig Clarke	Galway Sportsgrounds	7,800
(Scotland) Edinburgh	(South Africa) Alan Solomons	(Scotland) Greig Laidlaw	Murrayfield Stadium; Meggetland	67,144 (Note: Although Murrayfield's full capacity is 67,144, only the lower section of the West Stand, with a capacity of 12,464, is generally opened for Edinburgh fixtures.); 3,000 (Note: Used to replace Murrayfield for three of Edinburgh's home fixtures, due to concerns over the current Murrayfield Stadium playing surface.)
(Scotland) Glasgow Warriors	(Scotland) Gregor Townsend	(Scotland) Alastair Kellock	Scotstoun Stadium	10,000
(Ireland) Leinster	(Australia) Matt O'Connor	(Ireland) Leo Cullen	RDS Arena; Aviva Stadium	18,500; 51,700
(Ireland) Munster	(New Zealand) Rob Penney	(Ireland) Peter O’Mahony	Thomond Park; Musgrave Park	26,500; 9,251
(Wales) Newport Gwent Dragons	(Wales) Lyn Jones	(Wales) Andrew Coombs	Rodney Parade	11,676
(Wales) Ospreys	(Wales) Steve Tandy	(Wales) Alun Wyn Jones	Liberty Stadium	20,532
(Wales) Scarlets	(Ireland) Simon Easterby	(Wales) Jonathan Davies (Wales) Rob McCusker	Parc y Scarlets	14,870
(Ireland) Ulster	(New Zealand) Mark Anscombe	(South Africa) Johann Muller	Ravenhill	18,000
(Italy) Zebre	(Italy) Roberto Manghi	(Italy) Marco Bortolami	Stadio XXV Aprile	3,500

== Table ==
Pro12 Table
	Team	Played	Won	Drawn	Lost	Points For	Points Against	Points Difference	Tries For	Tries Against	Try Bonus	Losing Bonus	Points
1	(Ireland) Leinster (CH)	22	17	1	4	554	352	+202	57	30	8	4	82
2	(Scotland) Glasgow Warriors (RU)	22	18	0	4	484	309	+175	53	22	4	3	79
3	(Ireland) Munster (SF)	22	16	0	6	538	339	+199	56	27	7	3	74
4	(Ireland) Ulster (SF)	22	15	0	7	470	319	+151	45	26	6	4	70
5	(Wales) Ospreys	22	13	1	8	571	388	+183	59	32	6	6	66
6	(Wales) Scarlets	22	11	1	10	435	438	−3	43	45	3	6	55
7	(Wales) Cardiff Blues	22	8	1	13	425	538	−113	32	55	1	6	41
8	(Scotland) Edinburgh	22	7	0	15	397	526	−129	38	57	2	8	38
9	(Wales) Newport Gwent Dragons	22	7	1	14	392	492	−100	34	46	0	5	35
10	(Ireland) Connacht	22	6	0	16	371	509	−138	42	54	4	7	35
11	(Italy) Benetton Treviso	22	5	1	16	376	591	−215	31	72	1	7	30
12	(Italy) Zebre	22	5	2	15	347	559	−212	35	59	0	5	29
If teams are level at any stage, tiebreakers are applied in the following order: 1. number of matches won; 2. the difference between points for and points against; 3. the number of tries scored; 4. the most points scored; 5. the difference between tries for and tries against; 6. the fewest red cards received; 7. the fewest yellow cards received.
Green background (rows 1 to 4) are play-off places, and earn a place in the European Rugby Champions Cup. Blue background indicates teams outside the play-off places, that earn a place in the European Rugby Champions Cup. Plain background indicates teams that earn a place in the European Rugby Challenge Cup. European Rugby Champions/Challenge Cup qualification: The top team from each country, plus the three highest-placed teams apart from those, will qualify for the European Rugby Champions Cup. The remaining teams qualify for the European Rugby Challenge Cup. Updated 19 May 2014. Source: RaboDirect PRO12

== Fixtures ==
The weekend dates for the 2013–14 season were announced on 19 July 2013. All times are local.

=== Round 1 ===
6 September 2013
19:05

Scarlets (Wales)	19–42	(Ireland) Leinster (1 BP)
Try: McCusker 13' c Con: S. Shingler (1/1); Pen: S. Shingler (4/4) 4', 7', 38', 57'	Report	Try: Moore 17' c Murphy 41' c Hudson 68' c Gopperth 73' m D. Kearney 79' c Con: Gopperth (4/5); Pen: Gopperth (3/4) 32', 47', 62

Parc y Scarlets
Attendance: 6,329
Referee: John Lacey (IRFU)

6 September 2013
19:15

Newport Gwent Dragons (Wales)	15–8	(Ireland) Ulster (1 BP)
Pen: Tovey (4/6) 14', 48', 60', 70'; Drop: Tovey (1/1) 7'	Report	Try: Wilson 16' m Pen: Jackson (1/3) 11'

Rodney Parade
Attendance: 5,165
Referee: Claudio Blessano (FIR)

6 September 2013
19:35

Glasgow Warriors (Scotland)	22–15	(Wales) Cardiff Blues (1 BP)
Try: Seymour 68' c Con: Jackson (1/1); Pen: Wight (2/3) 3', 34'; Bennett (2/3) 13', 40'; Jackson (1/1) 73'	Report	Pen: Patchell (4/6) 6', 9', 52', 56'; Drop: Patchell (1/1) 66'

Scotstoun Stadium
Attendance: 5,052
Referee: Dudley Phillips (IRFU)

7 September 2013
17:00

Connacht (Ireland)	25–16	(Italy) Zebre
Try: White 4' m Healy 29' c Carr 75' c Con: Parks (2/3); Pen: Parks (2/4) 37', 62'	Report	Try: Manici 80' c Con: Orquera (1/1); Pen: Orquera (3/3) 7', 46', 60'

Galway Sportsgrounds
Attendance: 4,084
Referee: Rhys Thomas (WRU)

7 September 2013
19:30

(1 BP) Benetton Treviso (Italy)	19–24	(Wales) Ospreys
Try: Favaro 66' c Con: Di Bernardo (1/1); Pen: Di Bernardo (4/5) 12', 35', 39', 47'	Report	Try: Baldwin 23' c John 56' m Con: Biggar (1/2); Pen: Biggar (2/3) 14', 73'; Drop: Biggar (2/2) 50', 62'

Stadio Comunale di Monigo
Attendance: 4,981
Referee: Neil Paterson (SRU)

7 September 2013
19:15

(1 BP) Munster (Ireland)	34–23	(Scotland) Edinburgh
Try: D. Hurley 13' m Coughlan 15' c Cronin 32' c Dineen 53' m Hanrahan 68' c Con: Keatley (2/4); Hanrahan (1/1); Pen: Keatley (1/2) 22'	Report	Try: De Luca 50' c Jones 70' c Con: Francis (1/1); Leonard (1/1); Pen: Francis (2/4) 11', 26'; Leonard (1/1) 62'

Musgrave Park
Attendance: 6,810
Referee: Marius Mitrea (FIR)

=== Round 2 ===
13 September 2013
19:05

Cardiff Blues (Wales)	21–10	(Ireland) Connacht
Pen: Patchell (6/9) 20', 26', 52', 67', 74', 78'; Drop: Patchell (1/1) 33'	Report	Try: Healy 12' c Con: Parks (1/1); Pen: Parks (1/3) 40'

Cardiff Arms Park
Attendance: 6,874
Referee: Claudio Blessano (FIR)

13 September 2013
19:05

(1 BP) Ulster (Ireland)	12–13	(Scotland) Glasgow Warriors
Pen: Jackson (4/5) 8', 16', 22', 34'	Report	Try: Eddie 80' c Con: Hogg (1/1); Pen: Hogg (2/3) 6', 28'

Ravenhill
Attendance: 11,500
Referee: Ian Davies (WRU)

13 September 2013
19:30

Zebre (Italy)	21–43	(Ireland) Munster (1 BP)
Try: Orquera 22' m Manici 39' c Con: Orquera (1/2); Pen: Orquera (3/3) 19', 36', 64'	Report	Try: Butler 46' c Stander (2) 58' c, 66' c Keatley 75' c Con: Hanrahan (3/3); Keatley (1/1); Pen: Hanrahan (5/5) 5', 15', 32', 45', 51'

Stadio XXV Aprile
Attendance: 2,550
Referee: Andrew McMenemy (SRU)

13 September 2013
19:45

Edinburgh (Scotland)	16–13	(Wales) Newport Gwent Dragons (1 BP)
Try: Visser 47' c Con: Leonard (1/1); Pen: Leonard (3/4) 5', 20', 80'	Report	Try: Rees 53' c Con: Tovey (1/1); Pen: Tovey (1/2) 3'; Burton (1/1) 75'

Murrayfield Stadium
Attendance: 3,692
Referee: Dudley Phillips (IRFU)

14 September 2013
18:15

Leinster (Ireland)	29–29	(Wales) Ospreys
Try: Strauss 5' m D. Kearney 13' m J. McGrath 70' c Con: Gopperth (1/3); Pen: Gopperth (3/3) 30', 50', 76'; Drop: Gopperth (1/1) 24'	Report	Try: Bearman 53' c Beck 55' c Con: Biggar (2/2); Pen: Biggar (5/5) 3', 26', 40', 46', 80'

RDS Arena
Attendance: 16,885
Referee: Leighton Hodges (WRU)

14 September 2013
18:30

Scarlets (Wales)	26–10	(Italy) Benetton Treviso
Try: G. Davies (2) 3' c, 14' c Con: S. Shingler (2/2); Pen: S. Shingler (4/4) 44', 56', 64', 71'	Report	Try: Nitoglia 47' c Con: Botes (1/1); Pen: Botes (1/1) 40'

Parc y Scarlets
Attendance: 5,847
Referee: David Wilkinson (IRFU)

=== Round 3 ===
20 September 2013
19:05

Newport Gwent Dragons (Wales)	23–16	(Wales) Scarlets (1 BP)
Try: Price 11' c D. Evans 20' c Con: Tovey (2/2); Pen: Prydie (2/2) 4', 69'; Tovey (1/1) 55'	Report	Try: S. Williams 34' c Con: Priestland (1/1); Pen: Priestland (3/4) 17', 27', 45'

Rodney Parade
Attendance: 6,777
Referee: Nigel Owens (WRU)

20 September 2013
19:30

(1 BP) Cardiff Blues (Wales)	25–30	(Italy) Zebre
Try: Hewitt 2' c Con: Halfpenny (1/1); Pen: Halfpenny (6/7) 31', 42', 49', 63', 68', 75'	Report	Try: Bergamasco 14' c Odiete 66' c Leonard 72' c Con: Orquera (3/3); Pen: Orquera (3/4) 20', 35', 47'

Cardiff Arms Park
Attendance: 7,513
Referee: Leo Colgan (IRFU)

20 September 2013
19:35

Glasgow Warriors (Scotland)	12–6	(Ireland) Leinster (1 BP)
Try: Fusaro 39' c Yanuyanutawa 75' m Con: Hogg (1/1)	Report	Pen: Gopperth (2/2) 24', 60'

Scotstoun Stadium
Attendance: 5,152
Referee: Peter Fitzgibbon (IRFU)

20 September 2013
20:30

Benetton Treviso (Italy)	29–19	(Ireland) Munster
Try: Nitoglia (2) 49' c, 61' c Con: Berquist (2/2); Pen: Berquist (5/5) 13', 17', 37', 59', 65'	Report	Try: Earls 7' m penalty try 28' c Archer 46' c Con: Keatley (2/3)

Stadio Comunale di Monigo
Attendance: 4,528
Referee: Leighton Hodges (WRU)

21 September 2013
18:30

(1 BP) Ospreys (Wales)	44–10	(Scotland) Edinburgh
Try: Hassler 3' c Walker (2) 38' m, 55' c Hibbard (2) 42' m, 53' c Morgan 77' c Con: Biggar (3/5); Morgan (1/1); Pen: Biggar (2/2) 16', 19'	Report	Try: Visser 45' c Con: Leonard (1/1); Pen: Leonard (1/1) 32'

Liberty Stadium
Attendance: 8,356
Referee: Marius Mitrea (FIR)

21 September 2013
18:45

Connacht (Ireland)	7–18	(Ireland) Ulster
Try: Parks 10' c Con: Parks (1/1)	Report	Try: Allen 15' m Jackson 57' c Con: Jackson (1/2); Pen: Jackson (2/4) 55', 64'

Galway Sportsgrounds
Attendance: 5,485
Referee: John Lacey (IRFU)

=== Round 4 ===
27 September 2013
19:05

(1 BP) Ulster (Ireland)	32–13	(Italy) Benetton Treviso
Try: L. Marshall 22' c Allen (2) 29' m, 80' c Bowe 52' m Best 63' m Con: Jackson (2/5); Pen: Jackson (1/1) 11'	Report	Try: Barbieri 70' c Con: Di Bernardo (1/1); Pen: Berquist (1/1) 18'; Di Bernardo (1/1) 43'

Ravenhill
Attendance: 10,693
Referee: Ian Davies (WRU)

27 September 2013
19:30

(1 BP) Zebre (Italy)	17–24	(Scotland) Glasgow Warriors
Try: Vunisa 73' c Sarto 77' c Con: Orquera (2/2); Pen: Orquera (1/2) 32'	Report	Try: McGuigan (2) 27' c, 56' c Hall 41' c Con: Pyrgos (3/3); Pen: Pyrgos (1/2) 25'

Stadio XXV Aprile
Attendance: 2,800
Referee: Dudley Phillips (IRFU)

27 September 2013
19:35

(1 BP) Leinster (Ireland)	34–20	(Wales) Cardiff Blues
Try: Cronin 13' c penalty try 49' c Ryan 67' c Madigan 74' c Con: Madigan (4/4); Pen: Madigan (2/2) 22', 25'	Report	Try: Cuthbert 53' c Allen 77' c Con: Halfpenny (1/1); Patchell (1/1); Pen: Halfpenny (2/3) 6', 29'

RDS Arena
Attendance: 17,180
Referee: Marius Mitrea (FIR)

27 September 2013
19:45

Edinburgh (Scotland)	9–22	(Wales) Scarlets
Pen: Leonard (3/3) 29', 40', 42'	Report	Try: Reynolds 35' c J. Williams 46' m J. Davies 72' c Con: Priestland (2/3); Pen: Priestland (1/2) 32'

Murrayfield Stadium
Attendance: 3,586
Referee: David Wilkinson (IRFU)

28 September 2013
17:00

Connacht (Ireland)	26–43	(Wales) Ospreys (1 BP)
Try: Poolman 55' c Marmion 62' c Con: Parks (2/2); Pen: Ronaldson (4/5) 4', 26', 32', 37'	Report	Try: Biggar 7' c Fussell 15' c Walker 29' m Tebaldi 59' c Hassler 71' c A. W. Jones 77' c Con: Biggar (5/6); Pen: Biggar (1/1) 35'

Galway Sportsgrounds
Attendance: 3,888
Referee: Andrew McMenemy (SRU)

28 September 2013
18:45

Munster (Ireland)	23–9	(Wales) Newport Gwent Dragons
Try: Cronin 35' c P. O'Mahony 51' c Con: Hanrahan (2/2); Pen: Hanrahan (3/4) 7', 19', 62'	Report	Pen: Burton (3/3) 10', 20', 46'

Musgrave Park
Attendance: 6,248
Referee: Neil Paterson (SRU)

=== Round 5 ===
4 October 2013
19:05

(1 BP) Ospreys (Wales)	12–18	(Ireland) Ulster
Pen: Biggar (4/4) 21', 40', 42', 45'	Report	Pen: Jackson (6/6) 49', 53', 57', 65', 73', 77'

Liberty Stadium
Attendance: 10,049
Referee: Peter Fitzgibbon (IRFU)

4 October 2013
19:15

Newport Gwent Dragons (Wales)	30–7	(Italy) Zebre
Try: Amos (2) 40' c, 49' c Rees 66' c Con: Tovey (3/3); Pen: Tovey (3/3) 13', 18', 33'	Report	Try: Sarto 60' c Con: Orquera (1/1)

Rodney Parade
Attendance: 5,554
Referee: Matteo Liperini (FIR)

4 October 2013
20:30

Benetton Treviso (Italy)	23–3	(Ireland) Connacht
Try: Zanni 52' c Morisi 79' c Con: Botes (2/2); Pen: Di Bernardo (3/3) 8', 34', 40'	Report	Pen: Parks (1/2) 51'

Stadio Comunale di Monigo
Attendance: 3,948
Referee: Neil Hennessy (WRU)

5 October 2013
18:30

(1 BP) Scarlets (Wales)	12–17	(Scotland) Glasgow Warriors
Pen: Priestland (3/3) 17', 38', 42'; J. Williams (1/2) 60'	Report	Try: Grant 4' c Swinson 30' c Con: Weir (2/2); Pen: Weir (1/1) 62'

Parc y Scarlets
Attendance: 6,504
Referee: Giuseppe Vivarini (FIR)

5 October 2013
18:45

Munster (Ireland)	19–15	(Ireland) Leinster (1 BP)
Try: Earls 33' c Con: Keatley (1/1); Pen: Keatley (4/6) 30', 43', 57', 63'	Report	Pen: Madigan (4/5) 3', 24', 53', 55'; McFadden (1/1) 40'

Thomond Park
Attendance: 20,646
Referee: Romain Poite (FFR)

6 October 2013
14:05

Cardiff Blues (Wales)	29–12	(Scotland) Edinburgh Rugby
Try: Cuthbert (2) 28' c, 66' c Con: Halfpenny (2/2); Pen: Halfpenny (5/6) 4', 26', 53', 57', 60'	Report	Pen: Laidlaw (4/5) 16', 24', 32', 38'

Cardiff Arms Park
Attendance: 7,245
Referee: George Clancy (IRFU)

=== Round 6 ===
25 October 2013
19:05

(1 BP) Ulster (Ireland)	39–21	(Wales) Cardiff Blues
Try: Tuohy (2) 15' m, 80' c Payne 23' m L. Marshall 42' m Trimble 67' m Con: Pienaar (1/2); Pen: Jackson (3/4) 8', 28', 46'; Pienaar (1/2) 55'	Report	Try: Copeland 34' m Smith 51' c Con: Halfpenny (1/2); Pen: Halfpenny (3/3) 11', 38', 57'

Ravenhill
Attendance: 12,948
Referee: Giuseppe Vivarini (FIR)

25 October 2013
19:05

(1 BP) Ospreys (Wales)	40–17	(Wales) Newport Gwent Dragons
Try: Tipuric (2) 19' c, 46' c penalty try 53' c Baldwin 71' c Con: Biggar (4/4); Pen: Biggar (3/3) 9', 28', 38'; Drop: Morgan (1/1) 45'	Report	Try: Prydie 4' c Tetaz Chaparro 76' c Con: Burton (2/2); Drop: Burton (1/1) 33'

Liberty Stadium
Attendance: 8,732
Referee: Nigel Owens (WRU)

25 October 2013
19:30

Zebre (Italy)	16–16	(Wales) Scarlets
Try: Garcia 15' c Con: Iannone (1/1); Pen: Iannone (2/3) 21', 66'; Orquera (1/1) 77'	Report	Try: G. Davies 28' c Con: S. Shingler (1/1); Pen: S. Shingler (1/2) 4'; Priestland (2/2) 73', 80'

Stadio XXV Aprile
Attendance: 1,560
Referee: John Lacey (IRFU)

25 October 2013
19:35

(1 BP) Glasgow Warriors (Scotland)	6–13	(Ireland) Munster
Pen: Weir (2/3) 3', 25'	Report	Try: Hanrahan 44' c Con: Hanrahan (1/1); Pen: Hanrahan (2/2) 21', 47'

Scotstoun Stadium
Attendance: 5,726
Referee: Ian Davies (WRU)

25 October 2013
19:45

Edinburgh (Scotland)	20–13	(Italy) Benetton Treviso (1 BP)
Try: Tonks 11' c Nel 74' c Con: Laidlaw (2/2); Pen: Laidlaw (2/3) 40', 53'	Report	Try: McLean 61' c Con: Botes (1/1); Pen: Ambrosini (1/2) 36'; Botes (1/1) 67'

Murrayfield Stadium
Attendance: 3,993
Referee: Alain Rolland (IRFU)

26 October 2013
18:45

Leinster (Ireland)	16–13	(Ireland) Connacht (1 BP)
Try: penalty try 77' c Con: Madigan (1/1); Pen: Madigan (3/4) 10', 29', 40'	Report	Try: Marmion 13' c Con: Parks (1/1); Pen: Parks (2/3) 2', 7'

RDS Arena
Attendance: 16,780
Referee: David Wilkinson (IRFU)

=== Round 7 ===
1 November 2013
19:05

(1 BP) Newport Gwent Dragons (Wales)	19–23	(Ireland) Leinster
Try: Wardle 31' c Con: Tovey (1/1); Pen: Prydie (1/2) 15'; Tovey (3/3) 43', 71', 73'	Report	Try: Dundon 58' c Reid 62' c Con: Gopperth (2/2); Pen: Gopperth (3/5) 13', 40', 50'

Rodney Parade
Attendance: 6,174
Referee: Peter Fitzgibbon (IRFU)

1 November 2013
19:45

Edinburgh (Scotland)	25–23	(Italy) Zebre (1 BP)
Try: Tonks 20' m Nel 28' c du Preez 55' c Con: Leonard (2/3); Pen: Leonard (2/3) 43', 63'	Report	Try: Iannone 31' c Sarto 40' c Con: Orquera (2/2); Pen: Orquera (3/3) 17', 68', 74'

Murrayfield Stadium
Attendance: 3,156
Referee: Leighton Hodges (WRU)

2 November 2013
14:30

Cardiff Blues (Wales)	17–13	(Italy) Benetton Treviso (1 BP)
Try: Dacey 17' c Hobbs 54' c Con: G. Davies (2/2); Pen: G. Davies (1/2) 14'	Report	Try: Campagnaro 32' c Con: Berquist (1/1); Pen: Berquist (2/2) 21', 28'

Cardiff Arms Park
Attendance: 6,986
Referee: Andrew McMenemy (SRU)

2 November 2013
17:00

(1 BP) Connacht (Ireland)	12–19	(Scotland) Glasgow Warriors
Pen: Parks (2/4) 15', 51'; Ronaldson (2/3) 61', 69'	Report	Try: Van der Merwe 5' c Con: Weir (1/1); Pen: Weir (4/4) 24', 33', 55', 79'

Galway Sportsgrounds
Attendance: 4,185
Referee: Neil Paterson (SRU)

2 November 2013
18:30

Scarlets (Wales)	17–9	(Ireland) Ulster
Try: Barclay 31' m Pen: S. Shingler (1/1) 23'; A. Thomas (3/3) 40', 64', 77'	Report	Pen: Pienaar (3/5) 9', 45', 69'

Parc y Scarlets
Attendance: 6,506
Referee: Alain Rolland (IRFU)

2 November 2013
19:15

Munster (Ireland)	12–6	(Wales) Ospreys (1 BP)
Pen: Keatley (3/5) 5', 22', 56'; Hanrahan (1/1) 68'	Report	Pen: Morgan (2/3) 26', 80'

Thomond Park
Attendance: 14,216
Referee: Giuseppe Vivarini (FIR)

=== Round 8 ===
22 November 2013
19:05

(1 BP) Ulster (Ireland)	41–17	(Scotland) Edinburgh
Try: Gilroy (2) 28' c, 64' c P. Marshall 33' c Diack 61' c McKinney 66' c Con: McKinney (5/5); Pen: McKinney (2/2) 20', 40'	Report	Try: du Preez 15' m Fife 72' m Hart 75' c Con: Leonard (1/3)

Ravenhill
Attendance: 12,955
Referee: Neil Hennessy (WRU)

22 November 2013
19:35

Glasgow Warriors (Scotland)	8–23	(Wales) Newport Gwent Dragons
Try: Matawalu 2' m Pen: Pyrgos (1/2) 44'	Report	Try: Tovey 33' c Harries 57' c Con: Tovey (2/2); Pen: Tovey (2/2) 8', 11'; Drop: Tovey (1/1) 76'

Scotstoun Stadium
Attendance: 4,665
Referee: Peter Fitzgibbon (IRFU)

23 November 2013
14:30

Ospreys (Wales)	30–20	(Italy) Zebre
Try: Ardron 45' m D. Jones 48' c Con: Morgan (1/2); Pen: Morgan (6/6) 2', 10', 23', 37', 40', 76'	Report	Try: Cristiano 12' c Vunisa 61' c Con: Buso (1/1); Garcia (1/1); Pen: Buso (1/1) 27'; Garcia (1/2) 30'

Liberty Stadium
Attendance: 6,529
Referee: Leo Colgan (IRFU)

23 November 2013
17:00

(1 BP) Connacht (Ireland)	21–24	(Wales) Scarlets
Try: Healy 56' c Harris-Wright 67' m Con: Ronaldson (1/1); Pen: Ronaldson (3/4) 3', 9', 34'	Report	Try: Climo 38' c Myhill 47' c G. Davies 52' c Con: A. Thomas (3/3); Pen: A. Thomas (1/1) 21'

Galway Sportsgrounds
Attendance: 4,172
Referee: Matteo Liperini (FIR)

23 November 2013
18:30

Cardiff Blues (Wales)	10–31	(Ireland) Munster (1 BP)
Try: Dacey 49' c Con: Humberstone (1/1); Pen: Humberstone (1/2) 13'	Report	Try: Jones 17' c Varley 27' c Cronin 31' c Conway 43' c Con: Hanrahan (4/4); Pen: Hanrahan (1/1) 38'

Cardiff Arms Park
Attendance: 6,122
Referee: David Wilkinson (IRFU)

24 November 2013
15:00

(1 BP) Benetton Treviso (Italy)	20–21	(Ireland) Leinster
Try: Nitoglia 28' c Esposito 61' c Con: Berquist (2/2); Pen: Berquist (2/2) 22', 57'	Report	Try: Tuqiri 13' m Reid 15' c Con: Gopperth (1/2); Pen: Gopperth (3/5) 47', 53', 75'

Stadio Comunale di Monigo
Attendance: 3,938
Referee: Neil Paterson (SRU)

=== Round 9 ===
29 November 2013
19:05

Ospreys (Wales)	16–28	(Scotland) Glasgow Warriors
Try: Hassler 17' c Con: Davies (1/1); Pen: Davies (2/2) 34', 54'; Drop: Davies (1/1) 25'	Report	Try: Cusiter 58' m Van der Merwe 68' c Wilson 80' c Con: Jackson (2/3); Pen: Jackson (2/2) 3', 23'; Hogg (1/1) 61'

Liberty Stadium
Attendance: 5,679
Referee: Dudley Phillips (IRFU)

29 November 2013
19:15

(1 BP) Newport Gwent Dragons (Wales)	14–18	(Ireland) Munster
Try: Pewtner 43' m Pen: Tovey (2/4) 11', 40'; Drop: Tovey (1/1) 70'	Report	Pen: Keatley (6/7) 25', 52', 61', 67', 73', 76'

Rodney Parade
Attendance: 7,118
Referee: Marius Mitrea (FIR)

29 November 2013
19:45

(1 BP) Edinburgh (Scotland)	43–10	(Ireland) Connacht
Try: Fife 40' c du Preez 73' c De Luca 77' c Nel 79' c Con: Laidlaw (4/4); Pen: Laidlaw (5/5) 9', 20', 29', 51', 59'	Report	Try: Henshaw 15' c Con: Parks (1/1); Drop: Parks (1/1) 11'

Murrayfield Stadium
Attendance: 3,515
Referee: Leighton Hodges (WRU)

30 November 2013
15:00

Zebre (Italy)	11–19	(Ireland) Ulster
Try: Palazzani 54' m Pen: Garcia (2/2) 9', 16'	Report	Try: Cave 27' c Con: Jackson (1/1); Pen: Jackson (4/5) 11', 23', 48', 51'

Stadio XXV Aprile
Attendance: 1,250
Referee: Andrew McMenemy (SRU)

30 November 2013
17:00

Benetton Treviso (Italy)	26–26	(Wales) Cardiff Blues
Try: Zanni 49' c Gori 57' c Con: Berquist (2/2); Pen: Berquist (4/5) 3', 12', 22', 68'	Report	Try: Czekaj 7' c Copeland 31' c Con: G. Davies (2/2); Pen: G. Davies (4/4) 13', 17', 61', 76'

Stadio Comunale di Monigo
Attendance: 3,351
Referee: Leo Colgan (IRFU)

30 November 2013
19:15

(1 BP) Leinster (Ireland)	36–19	(Wales) Scarlets
Try: Macken 10' m penalty try 20' c J. McGrath 27' c Reddan 61' c Kirchner 76' c Con: Madigan (4/5); Pen: Madigan (1/1) 8'	Report	Try: G. Davies 47' m Maule 58' c Warren 80' c Con: A. Thomas (2/3)

RDS Arena
Attendance: 15,740
Referee: Ian Davies (WRU)

=== Round 10 ===
20 December 2013
19:05

(1 BP) Cardiff Blues (Wales)	19–22	(Wales) Ospreys
Try: Dacey 27' c Con: Halfpenny (1/1); Pen: Halfpenny (4/6) 3', 44', 56', 61'	Report	Try: Tipuric 48' c Con: Biggar (1/1); Pen: Biggar (4/4) 11', 22', 38', 40'; Drop: Biggar (1/1) 5'

Cardiff Arms Park
Attendance: 10,615
Referee: Jérôme Garcès (FFR)

20 December 2013
19:05

Ulster (Ireland)	13–6	(Italy) Zebre (1 BP)
Try: Payne 30' c Con: Pienaar (1/1); Pen: Pienaar (2/2) 49', 72'	Report	Pen: Orquera (1/2) 4'; Iannone (1/1) 15'

Ravenhill
Attendance: 13,937
Referee: Neil Hennessy (WRU)

20 December 2013
19:35

Edinburgh (Scotland)	11–6	(Ireland) Leinster (1 BP)
Try: Fife 31' m Pen: Laidlaw (2/3) 38', 47'	Report	Pen: Madigan (2/2) 22', 43'

Murrayfield Stadium
Attendance: 3,321
Referee: Peter Fitzgibbon (IRFU)

20 December 2013
19:35

Glasgow Warriors (Scotland)	P–P	(Italy) Benetton Treviso
	Postponed due to a waterlogged pitch.

Scotstoun Stadium
Referee: Claudio Blessano (FIR)

21 December 2013
17:00

Connacht (Ireland)	14–11	(Wales) Newport Gwent Dragons (1 BP)
Try: Carr 75' m Pen: Parks (2/3) 33', 44'; Drop: Parks (1/1) 80'	Report	Try: D. Evans 8' m Pen: Tovey (2/3) 16', 51'

Galway Sportsgrounds
Attendance: 4,033
Referee: Alain Rolland (IRFU)

21 December 2013
19:15

Munster (Ireland)	16–10	(Wales) Scarlets (1 BP)
Try: R. O'Mahony 80' c Con: Hanrahan (1/1); Pen: Hanrahan (3/5) 23', 47', 57'	Report	Try: Barclay 42' c Con: A. Thomas (1/1); Pen: A. Thomas (1/2) 14'

Musgrave Park
Attendance: 7,867
Referee: Nigel Owens (WRU)

=== Round 11 ===
26 December 2013
14:05

(1 BP) Scarlets (Wales)	6–10	(Wales) Ospreys
Pen: Priestland (2/2) 7', 49'	Report	Try: Evans 74' c Con: Biggar (1/1); Pen: Biggar (1/3) 68'

Parc y Scarlets
Attendance: 14,796
Referee: Leighton Hodges (WRU)

26 December 2013
17:00

Newport Gwent Dragons (Wales)	22–16	(Wales) Cardiff Blues (1 BP)
Try: Faletau 16' c Con: Tovey (1/1); Pen: Tovey (5/5) 2', 51', 53', 62', 65'	Report	Try: Dacey 25' c Con: Halfpenny (1/1); Pen: Halfpenny (3/3) 40', 46', 70'

Rodney Parade
Attendance: 8,526
Referee: Ian Davies (WRU)

27 December 2013
19:15

Munster (Ireland)	22–16	(Ireland) Connacht (1 BP)
Try: Hanrahan 20' c Con: Hanrahan (1/1); Pen: Hanrahan (5/5) 9', 29', 44', 50', 76'	Report	Try: Heffernan 80' c Con: Parks (1/1); Pen: Parks (3/3) 13', 16', 61'

Thomond Park
Attendance: 18,870
Referee: Dudley Phillips (IRFU)

28 December 2013
15:00

Benetton Treviso (Italy)	20–15	(Italy) Zebre (1 BP)
Try: Van Zyl 19' c Vosawai 38' c Con: Berquist (2/2); Pen: Berquist (2/6) 59', 77'	Report	Try: Bortolami 12' m Van Schalkwyk 43' c Con: Orquera (1/2); Pen: Orquera (1/2) 18'

Stadio Comunale di Monigo
Attendance: 4,862
Referee: Andrew McMenemy (SRU)

28 December 2013
18:45

Leinster (Ireland)	19–6	(Ireland) Ulster
Try: Murphy 37' c Con: Gopperth (1/1); Pen: Gopperth (4/6) 4', 50', 57', 62'	Report	Pen: Jackson (2/2) 2', 33'

RDS Arena
Attendance: 18,500
Referee: John Lacey (IRFU)

==== 1872 Cup 1st round ====
26 December 2013
15:05

(1 BP) Edinburgh (Scotland)	16–20	(Scotland) Glasgow Warriors
Try: Fife 14' c Con: Laidlaw (1/1); Pen: Laidlaw (3/4) 8', 27', 39'	Report	Try: Hogg 67' m Pen: Weir (5/5) 3', 12', 22', 51', 62'

Murrayfield Stadium
Attendance: 10,125
Referee: Neil Paterson (SRU)

=== Round 12 ===
1 January 2014
14:05

Cardiff Blues (Wales)	21–13	(Wales) Newport Gwent Dragons
Pen: Patchell (1/1) 9'; Halfpenny (5/8) 22', 28', 55', 63', 80'; Drop: G. Davies (1/1) 71'	Report	Try: Harries 29' c Con: Tovey (1/1); Pen: Tovey (2/5) 34', 42'

Cardiff Arms Park
Attendance: 10,413
Referee: Leighton Hodges (WRU)

1 January 2014
18:05

Glasgow Warriors (Scotland)	P–P	(Scotland) Edinburgh
	Postponed due to a waterlogged pitch.

Scotstoun Stadium
Referee: Andrew McMenemy (SRU)

3 January 2014
19:05

Ulster (Ireland)	29–19	(Ireland) Munster
Try: Payne 6' c Cave 37' c Con: Pienaar (2/2); Pen: Pienaar (5/6) 4', 18', 62', 71', 80'	Report	Try: Dineen 40' m Kilcoyne 48' c Coughlan 66' c Con: Keatley (2/3)

Ravenhill
Attendance: 13,945
Referee: Alain Rolland (IRFU)

3 January 2014
19:15

Ospreys (Wales)	17–12	(Wales) Scarlets (1 BP)
Try: Beck 18' c Natoga 40' c Con: Biggar (2/2); Pen: Biggar (1/1) 50'	Report	Pen: Priestland (4/6) 38', 54', 59', 74'

Liberty Stadium
Attendance: 13,201
Referee: Nigel Owens (WRU)

4 January 2014
15:00

Zebre (Italy)	14–12	(Italy) Benetton Treviso (1 BP)
Try: Palazzani 12' m Pen: Orquera (3/4) 42', 52', 65'	Report	Pen: Berquist (4/5) 15', 27', 40', 55'

Stadio XXV Aprile
Attendance: 5,000
Referee: Alexandre Ruiz (FFR)

4 January 2014
19:15

Connacht (Ireland)	8–16	(Ireland) Leinster
Try: Carr 22' m Pen: Carty (1/1) 40'	Report	Try: D'Arcy 73' c Con: Gopperth (1/1); Pen: Madigan (1/3) 36'; Gopperth (2/2) 57', 63'

Galway Sportsgrounds
Attendance: 7,210
Referee: George Clancy (IRFU)

=== Round 13 ===
7 February 2014
19:35

Ulster (Ireland)	10–7	(Wales) Ospreys (1 BP)
Try: Cave 44' c Con: Pienaar (1/1); Pen: Pienaar (1/2) 24'	Report	Try: Lewis 10' c Con: Davies (1/1)

Ravenhill
Attendance: 12,986
Referee: Nigel Owens (WRU)

8 February 2014
14:00

Benetton Treviso (Italy)	33–41	(Wales) Scarlets (1 BP)
Try: Barbieri 60' c Swanepoel 69' c Nitoglia 75' c Con: Berquist (3/3); Pen: Berquist (4/4) 19', 31', 40', 45'	Report	Try: Penalty try 25' m Climo (2) 37' m, 42' c G. Davies 46' c K. Phillips 64' c J. Williams 78' c Con: A. Thomas (4/6); Pen: A. Thomas (1/2) 9'

Stadio Comunale di Monigo
Attendance: 2,918
Referee: Lloyd Linton (SRU)

8 February 2014
19:15

(1 BP) Munster (Ireland)	54–13	(Wales) Cardiff Blues
Try: Kilcoyne 10' c penalty try 60' c Zebo 64' c Van den Heever 66' c Conway 78' c Stander 80' c Con: Hanrahan (6/6); Pen: Hanrahan (4/4) 4', 22', 27', 40'	Report	Try: O. Williams 13' c Con: G. Davies (1/1); Pen: G. Davies (2/2) 8', 31'

Thomond Park
Attendance: 13,821
Referee: Giuseppe Vivarini (FIR)

9 February 2014
13:05

Newport Gwent Dragons (Wales)	P–P	(Scotland) Edinburgh
	Postponed due to a waterlogged pitch.

Rodney Parade
Referee: Alain Rolland (IRFU)

9 February 2014
14:00

Glasgow Warriors (Scotland)	8–6	(Ireland) Connacht (1 BP)
Try: Bennett 18' m Pen: Jackson (1/4) 43'	Report	Pen: Ronaldson (2/5) 8', 40'

Scotstoun Stadium
Attendance: 3,904
Referee: Leighton Hodges (WRU)

9 February 2014
18:00

Zebre (Italy)	8–31	(Ireland) Leinster (1 BP)
Try: Van Schalkwyk 15' m Pen: Haimona (1/1) 58'	Report	Try: Cooney 22' c Reid 55' c Kirchner 66' c Hudson 78' c Con: Gopperth (2/2); Madigan (2/2); Pen: Gopperth (1/1) 40'

Stadio XXV Aprile
Attendance: 1,450
Referee: Neil Hennessy (WRU)

=== Round 14 ===
14 February 2014
19:05

Ulster (Ireland)	P–P	(Wales) Scarlets
	Postponed due to a waterlogged pitch.

Ravenhill
Referee: Leighton Hodges (WRU)

14 February 2014
19:45

(1 BP) Leinster (Ireland)	31–19	(Wales) Newport Gwent Dragons
Try: J. McGrath 38' c penalty try (2) 60' c, 67' c Hudson 80' c Con: Madigan (4/4); Pen: Madigan (1/1) 14'	Report	Try: Smith 46' m Rees 48' m Pen: Tovey (2/2) 53', 70'; Drop: Tovey (1/1) 28'

RDS Arena
Attendance: 15,000
Referee: Marius Mitrea (FIR)

15 February 2014
17:00

Connacht (Ireland)	11–7	(Scotland) Edinburgh (1 BP)
Try: Swift 47' m Pen: Ronaldson (1/4) 20'; Parks (1/1) 68'	Report	Try: Grant 7' c Con: Bezuidenhout (1/1)

Galway Sportsgrounds
Attendance: 4,038
Referee: Claudio Blessano (FIR)

15 February 2014
18:30

(1 BP) Cardiff Blues (Wales)	20–27	(Scotland) Glasgow Warriors
Try: Copeland 34' c Jones 44' c Con: Humberstone (2/2); Pen: Humberstone (1/1) 7'; G. Davies (1/1) 68'	Report	Try: Jones 40' c Eddie 71' c Bennett 78' c Con: Jackson (1/1); Russell (2/2); Pen: Russell (2/2) 54', 66'

Cardiff Arms Park
Attendance: 5,645
Referee: George Clancy (IRFU)

15 February 2014
18:45

(1 BP) Munster (Ireland)	36–8	(Italy) Zebre
Try: Zebo (2) 26' c, 34' m Slattery (2) 62' c, 79' c O'Donnell 70' c Con: Hanrahan (1/2); Keatley (3/3); Pen: Hanrahan (1/1) 15'	Report	Try: D'Apice 12' m Pen: Palazzani (1/1) 44'

Musgrave Park
Attendance: 7,330
Referee: Dudley Phillips (IRFU)

16 February 2014
16:00

(1 BP) Ospreys (Wales)	75–7	(Italy) Benetton Treviso
Try: Spratt (2) 21' c, 42' c Beck 24' c Webb 34' c Natoga 49' c Hassler 57' c Davies (2) 59' c, 79' c Baker 63' c Dirksen 65' m Ry. Jones 73' c Con: Biggar (4/4); Davies (6/7)	Report	Try: Tveraga 54' c Con: Berquist (1/1)

Liberty Stadium
Attendance: 5,089
Referee: Nigel Owens (WRU)

=== Round 15 ===
20 February 2014
20:05

Cardiff Blues (Wales)	22–34	(Ireland) Leinster (1 BP)
Try: G. Davies 21' c Dacey 35' m Fish 61' c Con: G. Davies (2/3); Pen: G. Davies (1/1) 45'	Report	Try: Conan 4' c Strauss 18' c Bent 52' c Reddan 56' c Con: Gopperth (4/4); Pen: Gopperth (2/3) 28', 47'

Cardiff Arms Park
Attendance: 5,063
Referee: Andrew McMenemy (SRU)

22 February 2014
14:30

Scarlets (Wales)	25–21	(Scotland) Edinburgh (1 BP)
Try: J. Williams (2) 32' c, 39' m Warren 58' c Con: A. Thomas (2/3); Pen: A. Thomas (2/2) 16', 22'	Report	Try: De Luca 4' c Brown 45' m Con: Bezuidenhout (1/1); Pen: Bezuidenhout (2/2) 12', 33'; Cuthbert (1/1) 62'

Parc y Scarlets
Attendance: 5,675
Referee: Marius Mitrea (FIR)

23 February 2014
15:00

(1 BP) Benetton Treviso (Italy)	12–14	(Ireland) Ulster
Pen: Berquist (4/5) 6', 49', 57', 71'	Report	Try: Cave 11' c Diack 51' c Con: Pienaar (2/2)

Stadio Comunale di Monigo
Attendance: 2,720
Referee: George Clancy (IRFU)

23 February 2014
14:30

Newport Gwent Dragons (Wales)	24–23	(Scotland) Glasgow Warriors (1 BP)
Try: O. Evans 14' c Hill 62' c Wardle 70' c Con: Tovey (1/1); R. Jones (2/2); Pen: Tovey (1/1) 10'	Report	Try: Harley 3' c Matawalu 35' c Con: Russell (2/2); Pen: Bennett (1/2) 13'; Russell (2/3) 56', 67'

Rodney Parade
Attendance: 3,916
Referee: Matteo Liperini (FIR)

23 February 2014
16:00

Ospreys (Wales)	11–25	(Ireland) Munster
Try: Beck 39' m Pen: Davies (2/4) 18', 68'	Report	Try: Dougall 6' c Zebo 46' m Downey 71' c Con: Keatley (1/2); Hanrahan (1/1); Pen: Keatley (2/2) 16', 26'

Liberty Stadium
Attendance: 5,766
Referee: David Wilkinson (IRFU)

23 February 2014
17:30

Zebre (Italy)	19–27	(Ireland) Connacht (1 BP)
Try: Venditti 58' c Vunisa 66' m Van Schalkwyk 78' c Con: Nathan (1/2); Chillon (1/1)	Report	Try: Ah You 5' m Marmion 26' c penalty try 37' c Griffin 56' m Con: Parks (2/4); Pen: Parks (1/1) 3'

Stadio XXV Aprile
Attendance: 1,265
Referee: Ian Davies (WRU)

=== Round 16 ===
28 February 2014
19:05

(1 BP) Ulster (Ireland)	38–8	(Wales) Newport Gwent Dragons
Try: Pienaar 15' c Bowe (2) 24' c, 27' c penalty try 34' c Doyle 46' c Con: Jackson (5/5); Pen: Pienaar (1/1) 3'	Report	Try: Wardle 62' m Pen: R. Jones (1/2) 40'

Ravenhill
Attendance: 12,960
Referee: Lloyd Linton (SRU)

28 February 2014
19:35

Edinburgh (Scotland)	31–25	(Wales) Ospreys (1 BP)
Try: Hart (2) 12' c, 34' c Beard 25' m Con: Bezuidenhout (2/3); Pen: Bezuidenhout (4/4) 16', 58', 70', 77'	Report	Try: Hassler (2) 6' m, 61' m Pen: Biggar (5/5) 30', 38', 46', 55', 79'

Meggetland
Attendance: 3,000
Referee: Peter Fitzgibbon (IRFU)

1 March 2014
16:00

Zebre (Italy)	15–10	(Wales) Cardiff Blues (1 BP)
Try: Leonard 3' c Toniolatti 22' m Con: Haimona (1/1); Pen: Orquera (1/2) 65'	Report	Try: T. Williams 50' c Con: G. Davies (1/1); Pen: G. Davies (1/1) 7'

Stadio XXV Aprile
Attendance: 1,050
Referee: Gary Conway (IRFU)

1 March 2014
17:00

(1 BP) Connacht (Ireland)	38–6	(Italy) Benetton Treviso
Try: Carr 5' c Muldoon (2) 13' c, 63' c Marmion 33' c McKeon 75' c Con: Parks (4/4); Nikora (1/1); Pen: Parks (1/1) 23'	Report	Pen: Berquist (2/3) 9', 21'

Galway Sportsgrounds
Attendance: 3,850
Referee: Leighton Hodges (WRU)

1 March 2014
18:30

Scarlets (Wales)	18–13	(Ireland) Munster (1 BP)
Try: G. Davies 27' m Barclay 51' c Con: A. Thomas (1/1); Pen: Barkley (1/1) 13'; A. Thomas (1/1) 50'	Report	Try: Van den Heever 36' c Con: Keatley (1/1); Pen: Keatley (2/3) 15', 40'

Parc y Scarlets
Attendance: 6,487
Referee: Dudley Phillips (IRFU)

1 March 2014
20:30

Leinster (Ireland)	28–25	(Scotland) Glasgow Warriors (1 BP)
Try: Reid 6' c Fanning 38' m Ruddock 63' c Con: Madigan (2/3); Pen: Madigan (3/3) 18', 27', 30'	Report	Try: Vernon (2) 12' c, 23' m Matawalu 50' c Con: Russell (2/3); Pen: Russell (2/2) 40', 76'

RDS Arena
Attendance: 14,400
Referee: Nigel Owens (WRU)

=== Round 14 rescheduled match ===
14 March 2014
19:05

(1 BP) Ulster (Ireland)	26–13	(Wales) Scarlets
Try: Jackson (2) 16' c, 34' c Bowe 18' c Court 80' m Con: Pienaar (3/3)	Report	Try: G. Davies 36' c Con: Barkley (1/1); Pen: Barkley (2/3) 33', 62'

Ravenhill
Attendance: 14,000
Referee: Neil Hennessy (WRU)

This match – originally scheduled to be held during Round 14, on 14 February 2014 – was postponed due to a waterlogged pitch.

=== Round 17 ===
21 March 2014
19:05

(1 BP) Ospreys (Wales)	34–9	(Wales) Cardiff Blues
Try: Beck 10' c Natoga (3) 16' m, 29' m, 70' c Webb 48' c Con: Biggar (3/5); Pen: Biggar (1/1) 52'	Report	Pen: G. Davies (3/3) 13', 21', 27'

Liberty Stadium
Attendance: 8,832
Referee: Nigel Owens (WRU)

21 March 2014
19:15

(1 BP) Leinster (Ireland)	27–0	(Italy) Zebre
Try: Reid 33' m Fitzgerald (2) 59' c, 66' m Murphy 80' c Con: Madigan (2/4); Pen: Madigan (1/1) 8'	Report

RDS Arena
Attendance: 14,855
Referee: Marius Mitrea (FIR)

21 March 2014
19:45

(1 BP) Edinburgh (Scotland)	3–9	(Ireland) Ulster
Pen: Bezuidenhout (1/2) 14'	Report	Pen: Jackson (3/4) 24', 36', 46'

Murrayfield Stadium
Attendance: 6,333
Referee: John Lacey (IRFU)

22 March 2014
18:30

Glasgow Warriors (Scotland)	14–6	(Wales) Scarlets
Try: Matawalu 31' m Pen: Weir (3/3) 8', 21', 43'	Report	Pen: Barkley (2/2) 26', 50'

Scotstoun Stadium
Attendance: 4,679
Referee: Alain Rolland (IRFU)

22 March 2014
19:15

Munster (Ireland)	14–3	(Italy) Benetton Treviso
Try: Earls 37' c Downey 55' c Con: Hanrahan (2/2)	Report	Pen: Berquist (1/3) 3'

Thomond Park
Attendance: 13,946
Referee: Leighton Hodges (WRU)

23 March 2014
15:05

Newport Gwent Dragons (Wales)	8–24	(Ireland) Connacht (1 BP)
Try: Prydie 69' m Pen: Tovey (1/2) 2'	Report	Try: Muldoon (2) 17' c, 67' m Ah You 23' c Swift 79' m Con: Parks (2/2)

Rodney Parade
Attendance: 5,474
Referee: George Clancy (IRFU)

=== Round 18 ===
28 March 2014
19:35

Glasgow Warriors (Scotland)	11–9	(Wales) Ospreys (1 BP)
Try: Seymour 76' m Pen: Weir (2/3) 49', 58'	Report	Pen: Biggar (2/2) 20', 66'; Drop: Biggar (1/2) 72'

Scotstoun Stadium
Attendance: 5,038
Referee: John Lacey (IRFU)

29 March 2014
16:00

Zebre (Italy)	25–25	(Wales) Newport Gwent Dragons
Try: Vunisa 20' c Con: Orquera (1/1); Pen: Garcia (1/1) 32'; Orquera (5/5) 40', 47', 59', 65', 73'	Report	Try: D. Evans 26' m Smith 34' c Groves 77' c Con: Tovey (2/3); Pen: Tovey (2/3) 39', 54'

Stadio XXV Aprile
Attendance: 1,800
Referee: Peter Fitzgibbon (IRFU)

29 March 2014
19:00

Benetton Treviso (Italy)	20–16	(Scotland) Edinburgh (1 BP)
Try: Ghiraldini 61' c De Marchi 65' c Con: Botes (2/2); Pen: Botes (2/2) 13', 45'	Report	Try: du Preez 80' c Con: Bezuidenhout (1/1); Pen: Bezuidenhout (3/4) 25', 32', 37'

Stadio Comunale di Monigo
Attendance: 3,160
Referee: Nigel Owens (WRU)

29 March 2014
18:30

Cardiff Blues (Wales)	28–23	(Ireland) Ulster (1 BP)
Try: Copeland 36' c Con: G. Davies (1/1); Pen: G. Davies (7/7) 13', 26', 30', 33', 39', 65', 79'	Report	Try: Cave 3' m Pen: Jackson (6/6) 43', 47', 57', 67', 72', 75'

Cardiff Arms Park
Attendance: 7,084
Referee: Marius Mitrea (FIR)

29 March 2014
19:00

Leinster (Ireland)	22–18	(Ireland) Munster (1 BP)
Try: O'Driscoll 57' c Con: Madigan (1/1); Pen: Madigan (5/6) 25', 38', 46', 51', 79'	Report	Pen: Keatley (6/6) 4', 9', 22', 30', 64', 77'

Aviva Stadium
Attendance: 51,700
Referee: Alain Rolland (IRFU)

30 March 2014
14:05

(1 BP) Scarlets (Wales)	32–30	(Ireland) Connacht (2 BP)
Try: J. Davies 2' c G. Davies 49' c Turnbull 52' m Maule 79' c Con: Priestland (3/4); Pen: Priestland (2/5) 24', 34'	Report	Try: Marmion 55' m Carr 72' c Henshaw 75' m McKeon 80' c Con: Nikora (2/3); Pen: Parks (2/2) 6', 22'

Parc y Scarlets
Attendance: 6,111
Referee: Neil Paterson (SRU)

=== Round 13 rescheduled match ===
3 April 2014
18:30

(1 BP) Newport Gwent Dragons (Wales)	19–23	(Scotland) Edinburgh
Try: Wardle 73' c Con: Tovey (1/1); Pen: Tovey (4/4) 14', 33', 40', 48'	Report	Try: Nel 38' c Scott 50' c Con: Cuthbert (2/2); Pen: Cuthbert (3/4) 36', 67', 70'

Rodney Parade
Attendance: 4,574
Referee: Leo Colgan (IRFU)

This match – originally scheduled to be held during Round 13, on 9 February 2014 – was postponed due to a waterlogged pitch.

=== Round 10 rescheduled match ===
4 April 2014
19:35

(1 BP) Glasgow Warriors (Scotland)	29–10	(Italy) Benetton Treviso
Try: Pyrgos (2) 1' m, 14' c Matawalu 4' c Maitland 53' c Con: Russell (3/4); Pen: Russell (1/1) 46'	Report	Try: Sgarbi 11' c Con: Botes (1/1); Pen: Botes (1/3) 18'

Scotstoun Stadium
Attendance: 4,710
Referee: Giuseppe Vivarini (FIR)

This match – originally scheduled to be held during Round 10, on 20 December 2013 – was postponed due to a waterlogged pitch.

=== Round 19 ===
11 April 2014
19:05

Ospreys (Wales)	25–19	(Ireland) Leinster (1 BP)
Try: Hassler 33' c Con: Biggar (1/1); Pen: Biggar (5/6) 16', 21', 43', 51', 77'; Drop: Biggar (1/4) 71'	Report	Try: Healy 37' c Con: Gopperth (1/1); Pen: Gopperth (4/5) 10', 53', 60', 68'

Liberty Stadium
Attendance: 8,656
Referee: Marius Mitrea (FIR)

11 April 2014
19:05

(1 BP) Ulster (Ireland)	58–12	(Ireland) Connacht
Try: P. Marshall (2) 5' m, 25' c Trimble (3) 16' m, 42' c, 59' c Bowe 23' c L. Marshall 48' c Gilroy 68' c Con: Jackson (5/7); McKinney (1/1); Pen: Jackson (2/2) 12', 40'	Report	Try: McSharry 8' m Leader 62' c Con: Nikora (1/1)

Ravenhill
Attendance: 13,948
Referee: Ian Davies (WRU)

11 April 2014
19:45

(1 BP) Edinburgh (Scotland)	22–29	(Wales) Cardiff Blues (1 BP)
Try: Scott 10' c Brown 47' c du Preez 80' m Con: Cuthbert (2/3); Pen: Cuthbert (1/1) 5'	Report	Try: Allen (2) 19' c, 35' c Fish 42' c Hewitt 75' m Con: G. Davies (3/4); Pen: G. Davies (1/1) 4'

Meggetland
Attendance: 3,700
Referee: Dudley Phillips (IRFU)

12 April 2014
19:00

(1 BP) Benetton Treviso (Italy)	45–27	(Wales) Newport Gwent Dragons
Try: Nitoglia 22' c McLean 44' c Campagnaro 51' m Vosawai 61' c Muccignat 65' c Con: Berquist (4/5); Pen: Berquist (4/4) 17', 28', 31', 37'	Report	Try: Screech 57' c Wardle 64' c Hill 71' c Con: Tovey (3/3); Pen: Tovey (2/2) 10', 21'

Stadio Comunale di Monigo
Attendance: 3,183
Referee: George Clancy (IRFU)

12 April 2014
18:30

Munster (Ireland)	5–22	(Scotland) Glasgow Warriors
Try: Stander 18' m	Report	Try: Gray 4' c Maitland 25' m Strauss 36' c Con: Weir (2/3); Pen: Weir (1/1) 9'

Thomond Park
Attendance: 13,946
Referee: Nigel Owens (WRU)

12 April 2014
18:30

Scarlets (Wales)	27–20	(Italy) Zebre (1 BP)
Try: J. Williams 43' c Owens 53' m Con: Priestland (1/2); Pen: Priestland (5/6) 2', 9', 47', 58', 69'	Report	Try: Vunisa 27' m Toniolatti 34' m Garcia 65' c Con: Orquera (1/1); Pen: Garcia (1/2) 15'

Parc y Scarlets
Attendance: 6,708
Referee: Andrew McMenemy (SRU)

=== Round 20 ===
18 April 2014
17:00

(1 BP) Leinster (Ireland)	62–7	(Italy) Benetton Treviso
Try: Murphy 10' m Cronin 15' c Healy 22' c Kirchner 26' c Ryan 60' m Reid (2) 68' c, 80' c Heaslip 72' c L. McGrath 76' c Con: Gopperth (7/9); Pen: Gopperth (1/1) 5'	Report	Try: penalty try 39' c Con: Berquist (1/1)

RDS Arena
Attendance: 17,200
Referee: Neil Paterson (SRU)

18 April 2014
19:35

Glasgow Warriors (Scotland)	27–9	(Ireland) Ulster
Try: Maitland 40' c Seymour 48' c Bennett 67' c Con: Russell (3/3); Pen: Russell (2/2) 9', 43'	Report	Pen: Jackson (3/5) 21', 25', 28'

Scotstoun Stadium
Attendance: 7,417
Referee: John Lacey (IRFU)

19 April 2014
15:30

Zebre (Italy)	26–13	(Scotland) Edinburgh
Try: Venditti 16' m Cristiano 52' m Ratuvou 77' c Con: Orquera (1/3); Pen: Orquera (1/1) 8'; Garcia (2/2) 28', 40'	Report	Try: Scott 45' c Con: Cuthbert (1/1); Pen: Bezuidenhout (2/3) 2', 33'

Stadio XXV Aprile
Attendance: 1,866
Referee: Peter Fitzgibbon (IRFU)

19 April 2014
18:15

Connacht (Ireland)	23–32	(Ireland) Munster (1 BP)
Try: Healy 20' m McKeon 53' m Poolman 78' c Con: Parks (1/1); Pen: Nikora (2/2) 15', 63'	Report	Try: Conway 17' c Van den Heever 34' c D. Hurley 38' c Butler 72' m Con: Keatley (3/4); Pen: Keatley (2/2) 26', 30'

Galway Sportsgrounds
Attendance: 6,227
Referee: Marius Mitrea (FIR)

==== Judgement Day ====
20 April 2014
14:00

Cardiff Blues (Wales)	17–13	(Wales) Scarlets (1 BP)
Try: Cuthbert 4' m Pen: G. Davies (4/5) 10', 16', 36', 76'	Report	Try: Priestland 33' m Owens 71' m Pen: Priestland (1/2) 40'

Millennium Stadium
Attendance: 30,441
Referee: Ian Davies (WRU)

20 April 2014
16:45

Newport Gwent Dragons (Wales)	10–20	(Wales) Ospreys
Try: Rees 46' c Con: Burton (1/1); Pen: Prydie (1/1) 64'	Report	Try: Habberfield 61' c penalty try 78' c Con: Biggar (2/2); Pen: Biggar (2/2) 53', 70'

Millennium Stadium
Attendance: 30,441
Referee: Nigel Owens (WRU)

=== Round 12 rescheduled match ===
==== 1872 Cup 2nd round ====
26 April 2014
19:05

(1 BP) Glasgow Warriors (Scotland)	37–34	(Scotland) Edinburgh (2 BP)
Try: Murchie (2) 8' m, 49' c Jackson 22' m Bennett 40' c Harley 76' c Con: Russell (3/5); Pen: Russell (2/3) 4', 12'	Report	Try: Nel 15' c Scott 58' c Visser (2) 79' c, 80' c Con: Laidlaw (4/4); Pen: Laidlaw (2/3) 21', 36'

Scotstoun Stadium
Attendance: 8,855
Referee: Mathieu Raynal (FFR)

This match – originally scheduled to be held during Round 12, on 1 January 2014 – was postponed due to a waterlogged pitch.

=== Round 21 ===
1 May 2014
18:00

Zebre (Italy)	30–27	(Wales) Ospreys (1 BP)
Try: Venditti 12' c Leonard 69' c Palazzani 80' c Con: Orquera (1/1); Iannone (2/2); Pen: Orquera (3/4) 9', 29', 40'	Report	Try: Tipuric 41' c Beck 54' c A. W. Jones 67' c Con: Biggar (3/3); Pen: Biggar (2/3) 19', 23'

Stadio XXV Aprile
Attendance: 3,025
Referee: Peter Fitzgibbon (IRFU)

2 May 2014
20:00

Benetton Treviso (Italy)	16–38	(Scotland) Glasgow Warriors (1 BP)
Try: penalty try 78' c Con: Ambrosini (1/1); Pen: Berquist (3/3) 13', 24', 31'	Report	Try: Seymour (3) 21' c, 42' c, 58' c Reid 48' m Con: Russell (3/4); Pen: Russell (3/4) 15', 27', 39'; Bennett (1/1) 40'

Stadio Comunale di Monigo
Attendance: 3,113
Referee: George Clancy (IRFU)

2 May 2014
19:05

(1 BP) Scarlets (Wales)	34–23	(Wales) Newport Gwent Dragons
Try: Ball 16' c G. Davies 27' c J. Williams 31' c Owens 47' c Con: Priestland (4/4); Pen: Priestland (2/2) 24', 69'	Report	Try: Prydie (2) 40' c, 59' c Con: Burton (1/1); Tovey (1/1); Pen: Burton (3/4) 11', 39', 42'

Parc y Scarlets
Attendance: 6,521
Referee: Leighton Hodges (WRU)

2 May 2014
19:30

(1 BP) Ulster (Ireland)	20–22	(Ireland) Leinster
Try: Jackson 24' m Pen: Jackson (5/5) 34', 58', 68', 73', 78'	Report	Try: Jennings 59' c Con: Madigan (1/1); Pen: Madigan (4/7) 6', 12', 36', 53'; Gopperth (1/1) 70'

Ravenhill
Attendance: 16,950
Referee: Luke Pearce (RFU)

3 May 2014
17:00

(1 BP) Connacht (Ireland)	15–22	(Wales) Cardiff Blues
Try: Healy 26' c Henshaw 45' m Con: Nikora (1/2); Pen: Nikora (1/1) 22'	Report	Try: penalty try 56' c Jones 59' c Fish 69' m Con: G. Davies (2/2); Pen: G. Davies (1/1) 40'

Galway Sportsgrounds
Attendance: 5,168
Referee: Neil Paterson (SRU)

3 May 2014
17:00

Edinburgh (Scotland)	12–55	(Ireland) Munster (1 BP)
Try: Bezuidenhout 9' m Nel 22' c Con: Laidlaw (1/2)	Report	Try: Conway 16' c D. Hurley 40' c Varley 49' c penalty try (2) 55' c, 73' c Williams 66' c O'Donnell 80' c Con: Hanrahan (5/5); Murray (2/2); Pen: Hanrahan (2/2) 15', 27'

Meggetland
Attendance: 3,782
Referee: Marius Mitrea (FIR)

=== Round 22 ===
10 May 2014
18:30

(1 BP) Glasgow Warriors (Scotland)	54–0	(Italy) Zebre
Try: Hogg (2) 1' c, 19' m Grant 7' c Kellock 15' c Dunbar 22' c Matawalu (2) 31' c, 76' c Cross 66' c Con: Weir (6/7); Jackson (1/1)	Report

Scotstoun Stadium
Attendance: 5,950
Referee: Alain Rolland (IRFU)

10 May 2014
18:30

Leinster (Ireland)	15–13	(Scotland) Edinburgh (1 BP)
Try: Murphy 10' m D. Kearney 57' c Con: Gopperth (1/2); Pen: Gopperth (1/1) 51'	Report	Try: Visser 66' c Con: Laidlaw (1/1); Pen: Laidlaw (2/2) 6', 40'

RDS Arena
Attendance: 17,900
Referee: Leighton Hodges (WRU)

10 May 2014
18:30

(1 BP) Munster (Ireland)	17–19	(Ireland) Ulster
Try: Williams 14' c Dougall 49' c Con: Keatley (2/2); Pen: Keatley (1/1) 11'	Report	Try: Heaney 17' c Con: McKinney (1/1); Pen: McKinney (4/4) 36', 47', 53', 65'

Thomond Park
Attendance: 16,436
Referee: Nigel Owens (WRU)

10 May 2014
18:30

Newport Gwent Dragons (Wales)	20–19	(Italy) Benetton Treviso (1 BP)
Try: Morgan 30' c Harries 45' c Con: Tovey (2/2); Pen: Tovey (2/2) 4', 73'	Report	Try: Semenzato 15' m Vosawai 60' m Pen: Di Bernardo (3/5) 25', 32', 69'

Rodney Parade
Attendance: 6,026
Referee: John Lacey (IRFU)

10 May 2014
18:30

(1 BP) Ospreys (Wales)	45–20	(Ireland) Connacht
Try: Hassler 12' c Beck (2) 27' c, 45' c A. W. Jones 36' c N. Smith 60' c Baker 68' c Con: Biggar (6/6); Pen: Biggar (1/1) 34'	Report	Try: Leader 17' m Buckley 40' c Gilsenan 63' m Con: Nikora (1/3); Pen: Nikora (1/1) 4'

Liberty Stadium
Attendance: 6,403
Referee: Andrew McMenemy (SRU)

10 May 2014
18:30

Scarlets (Wales)	27–15	(Wales) Cardiff Blues
Try: R. Williams 13' c L. Williams 44' c S. Shingler 75' c Con: Priestland (1/1); S. Shingler (2/2); Pen: Priestland (1/2) 40'; S. Shingler (1/1) 70'	Report	Try: Cook 18' m penalty try 53' c Con: Humberstone (1/2); Pen: Humberstone (1/1) 24'

Parc y Scarlets
Attendance: 9,046
Referee: Ian Davies (WRU)

== Play-offs ==
=== Semi-finals ===
The semi-finals will follow a 1 v 4, 2 v 3 system with the games being played at the home ground of the higher placed teams.

16 May 2014
19:35

Glasgow Warriors (Scotland)	16–15	(Ireland) Munster
Try: Reid 46' c Con: Russell (1/1); Pen: Russell (3/4) 17', 36', 39'	Report	Try: Varley 9' c Dougall 51' m Con: Keatley (1/2); Pen: Keatley (1/1) 66'

Scotstoun Stadium
Attendance: 10,000
Referee: Marius Mitrea (FIR)

17 May 2014
19:00

Leinster (Ireland)	13–9	(Ireland) Ulster
Try: Madigan 72' c Con: Gopperth (1/1); Pen: Gopperth (2/2) 58', 64'	Report	Pen: Jackson (3/3) 7', 40', 53'

RDS Arena
Attendance: 18,246
Referee: Leighton Hodges (WRU)

=== Final ===
31 May 2014
18:15

Leinster (Ireland)	34–12	(Scotland) Glasgow Warriors
Try: Kirchner (2) 17' c, 74' c Jennings 38' c D'Arcy 76' c Con: Gopperth (4/4); Pen: Gopperth (2/3) 60', 65'	Report	Pen: Russell (4/4) 4', 13', 35', 40'

RDS Arena
Attendance: 19,200
Referee: Nigel Owens (WRU)

== Leading scorers ==
Note: Flags to the left of player names indicate national team as has been defined under IRB eligibility rules, or primary nationality for players who have not yet earned international senior caps. Players may hold one or more non-IRB nationalities.

=== Top points scorers ===
Rank	Player	Club	Points
1	(Wales) Dan Biggar	(Wales) Ospreys	219
2	(Ireland) Paddy Jackson	(Ireland) Ulster	183
3	(Wales) Jason Tovey	(Wales) Newport Gwent Dragons	176
4	(New Zealand) Jimmy Gopperth	(Ireland) Leinster	170
5	(Ireland) JJ Hanrahan	(Ireland) Munster	152

=== Top try scorers ===
Rank	Player	Club	Tries
1	(Wales) Gareth Davies	(Wales) Scarlets	10
2	(Wales) Ashley Beck	(Wales) Ospreys	8
2	(Canada) Jeff Hassler	(Wales) Ospreys	8
4	(Fiji) Nikola Matawalu	(Scotland) Glasgow Warriors	7
4	(Ireland) Noel Reid	(Ireland) Leinster	7

== End-of-season awards ==
Award	Winner
Players' Player of the Season:	(Wales) Dan Biggar (Ospreys)
Young Player of the Season:	(Scotland) Jonny Gray (Glasgow)
Coach of the Season:	(New Zealand) Rob Penney (Munster)
Chairman's Award:	(Ireland) Leo Cullen (Leinster) (Ireland) Brian O'Driscoll (Leinster)
Golden Boot:	(Ireland) JJ Hanrahan (Munster)
Collision Kings:	(Ireland) Connacht
Fairplay Award:	(Ireland) Connacht (Ireland) Ulster
Try of the Season:	(Scotland) Tommy Seymour (Glasgow vs Ospreys)

2013/2014 Dream Team

Pos		Player	Team
FB	15	(Wales) Liam Williams	(Wales) Scarlets
RW	14	(Canada) Jeff Hassler	(Wales) Ospreys
OC	13	(New Zealand) Casey Laulala	(Ireland) Munster
IC	12	(Scotland) Alex Dunbar	(Scotland) Glasgow
LW	11	(Ireland) Andrew Trimble	(Ireland) Ulster
FH	10	(Wales) Dan Biggar	(Wales) Ospreys
SH	9	(Wales) Gareth Davies	(Wales) Scarlets
N8	8	(Ireland) Robin Copeland	(Wales) Cardiff Blues
OF	7	(Ireland) Jordi Murphy	(Ireland) Leinster
BF	6	(Ireland) Rhys Ruddock	(Ireland) Leinster
RL	5	(Wales) Alun Wyn Jones	(Wales) Ospreys
LL	4	(South Africa) Johann Muller (c)	(Ireland) Ulster
TP	3	(Wales) Samson Lee	(Wales) Scarlets
HK	2	(Ireland) Seán Cronin	(Ireland) Leinster
LP	1	(Ireland) Dave Kilcoyne	(Ireland) Munster
