= Cristiano (given name) =

Cristiano is an Italian and Portuguese form of the male given name Christian.

Cristiano may also refer to:

- Cris (footballer, born 1977), Cristiano Marques Gomes, Brazilian footballer and manager
- Cris (footballer, born 1979), Cristiano Lima da Silva, Brazilian footballer
- Cris (footballer, born 1980), Cristiano Alves Pereira, Brazilian-born Togolese footballer
- Cristiano (footballer, born 1976), Cristiano Rocha Canedo Roland, Brazilian footballer
- Cristiano (footballer, born 1981), Cristiano dos Santos Rodrigues, Brazilian footballer
- Cristiano (footballer, born 1983), Cristiano Moraes de Oliveira, Brazilian footballer
- Cristiano (footballer, born May 1987), Cristiano da Silva Santos, Brazilian footballer
- Cristiano (footballer, born 1990), Cristiano Pereira Figueiredo, German-born Portuguese footballer
- Cristiano Alves, Brazilian clarinetist
- Cristiano Amon (born 1970), Brazilian electrical engineer
- Cristiano André, Angolan judge
- Cristiano Andrei (born 1973), Italian discus thrower
- Cristiano Araújo (1986–2015), Brazilian singer-songwriter
- Cristiano Ávalos (born 1977), Brazilian footballer
- Cristiano Bacci (born 1975), Italian footballer and coach
- Cristiano Banti (1824–1904), Italian genre and landscape painter
- Cristiano Bergodi (born 1964), Italian footballer and manager
- Cristiano Biraghi (born 1992), Italian footballer
- Cristiano Bortone (born 1968), Italian director, screenwriter and producer
- Cristiano Caccamo (born 1989), Italian actor
- Cristiano Camillucci (born 1981), Italian footballer
- Cristiano Caporezzo (born 1988), Brazilian politician
- Cristiano Caratti (born 1970), Italian tennis player
- Cristiano Castelfranchi (born 1944), Italian associate researcher
- Cristiano Citton (born 1974), Italian track cyclist
- Cristiano Corazzari (born 1975), Italian politician
- Cristiano Cordeiro (born 1973), Brazilian-born Hong Kong footballer
- Cristiano da Matta (born 1973), Brazilian racing driver
- Cristiano da Silva (born 1987), Brazilian footballer
- Cris Silva (born 1993), Cristiano da Silva Leite, Brazilian footballer
- Cristiano Dal Sasso (born 1965), Italian paleontologist
- Cristiano Del Grosso (born 1983), Italian footballer
- Cristiano Dias (born 1986), Brazilian footballer
- Cristiano Doni (born 1973), Italian footballer
- Cristiano Farinelli (17th century), Italian composer and violinist
- Cristiano Felício (born 1992), Brazilian basketball player
- Cristiano Ficco (born 2001), Italian weightlifter
- Cristiano Fitzgerald (born 2003), Singaporean-born Irish footballer
- Cristiano Fumagalli (born 1984), Italian road cyclist
- Cristiano Gimelli (born 1982), Italian footballer
- Cristiano Giuseppe Lidarti (1730–1793), Austrian composer
- Cristiano Godano (born 1966), Italian musician and author
- Cristiano Gomes (disambiguation), several people
- Cristiano Júnior (1979–2004), Brazilian footballer
- Cristiano Lombardi (born 1995), Italian footballer
- Cristiano Lopes (born 1978), Brazilian footballer
- Cristiano Lucarelli (born 1975), Italian footballer and manager
- Cristiano Luís Rodrigues or Asprilla (footballer, born 1981), Brazilian footballer
- Cristiano Lupatelli (born 1978), Italian footballer and coach
- Cristiano Machado (1893–1953), Brazilian politician
- Cristiano Malgioglio (born 1945), Italian composer
- Cristiano Marcello (born 1977), Brazilian mixed martial artist
- Cristiano Michelena (born 1971), Brazilian swimmer
- Cristiano Migliorati (born 1968), Italian motorcycle racer
- Cristiano Monguzzi (born 1985), Italian racing cyclist
- Cristiano Morgado (born 1979), South African racing driver
- Cristiano Novembre (born 1987), Italian football goalkeeper
- Cristiano Parreiro (born 1979), Portuguese futsal player
- Cristiano Pascoal (born 1992), Portuguese footballer
- Cristiano Pereira de Souza or Brasília (born 1977), Brazilian footballer
- Cristiano Piccini (born 1992), Italian footballer
- Cristiano Ronaldo (born 1985), Portuguese footballer
- Cristiano Ruiu (born 1979), Brazilian sports journalist
- Cristiano Salerno (born 1985), Italian road cyclist
- Cristiano Scazzola (born 1971), Italian footballer and coach
- Cristiano Sergipano (born 1989), Brazilian footballer
- Cristiano Souza (born 1982), Brazilian mixed martial artist
- Cristiano Spirito (born 1992), Italian footballer
- Cristiano Testa (born 1973), Brazilian tennis player
- Cristiano Vidal (born 1996), Brazilian footballer
- Cristiano Vasconcelos (born 1989), Portuguese footballer
- Cristiano Zanetti (born 1977), Italian footballer and coach
- Cristiano Zanin (born 1975), Brazilian lawyer and judge

== See also ==
- Cristiano Otoni, Brazilian municipality located in the state of Minas Gerais
- Christianno, Brazilian footballer
- Christian (disambiguation)
- Cristiano (surname)
