= Christiano (surname) =

Christiano is a surname. Notable people with the surname include:

- Angela Christiano, molecular geneticist in the field of dermatology
- Jon Christiano (born 1958), American former ice hockey coach
- Lawrence J. Christiano, American economist and researcher
- Paul Christiano, American researcher
- Paul Christiano (choreographer) (1976–2015), American choreographer and dancer
- Rich Christiano (born 1956), an American filmmake

== See also ==
- Christiano (disambiguation)
