= Cristiano =

Cristiano may refer to:

- Cristiano (given name), Italian and Portuguese male given name
- Cristiano (surname)
- Cristiano Ronaldo (born 1985), Portuguese soccer forward
- Cristiano (footballer, born 1976), Brazilian soccer defender
- Cristiano (footballer, born 1981), Brazilian soccer striker
- Cristiano (footballer, born 1983), Brazilian soccer midfielder
- Cristiano (footballer, born January 1987), Brazilian soccer midfielder
- Cristiano (footballer, born May 1987), Brazilian soccer striker
- Cristiano (footballer, born 1990), Portuguese soccer goalkeeper
- Cristiano (footballer, born 1999), Brazilian soccer forward
- Cristiano (footballer, born 2000), Brazilian soccer midfielder

== See also ==
- Christiano (disambiguation)
- Christian (disambiguation)
- Cristiano Ronaldo (disambiguation)
