= Cristiano (surname) =

Cristiano is a surname. Notable people with the surname include:

- Andrea Cristiano (born 1984), Italian footballer
- Anthony Cristiano, Italian-born Canadian film director, educator, and writer
- Carmela Marie Cristiano (1927–2011), American Roman Catholic religious sister
- Domenico Cristiano (born 1976), Italian football coach and player
- Filippo Cristiano (born 1987), Italian rugby union player

== See also ==
- Cristiano (given name)
