= Christiano =

Christiano may refer to:

- Christiano (footballer), Brazilian footballer
- Christiano (surname), surname

== See also ==
- Cristiano (disambiguation)
- Christian (disambiguation)
- Cristiani
