= Michele Strazzabosco =

Italian ice hockey player (born 1976)

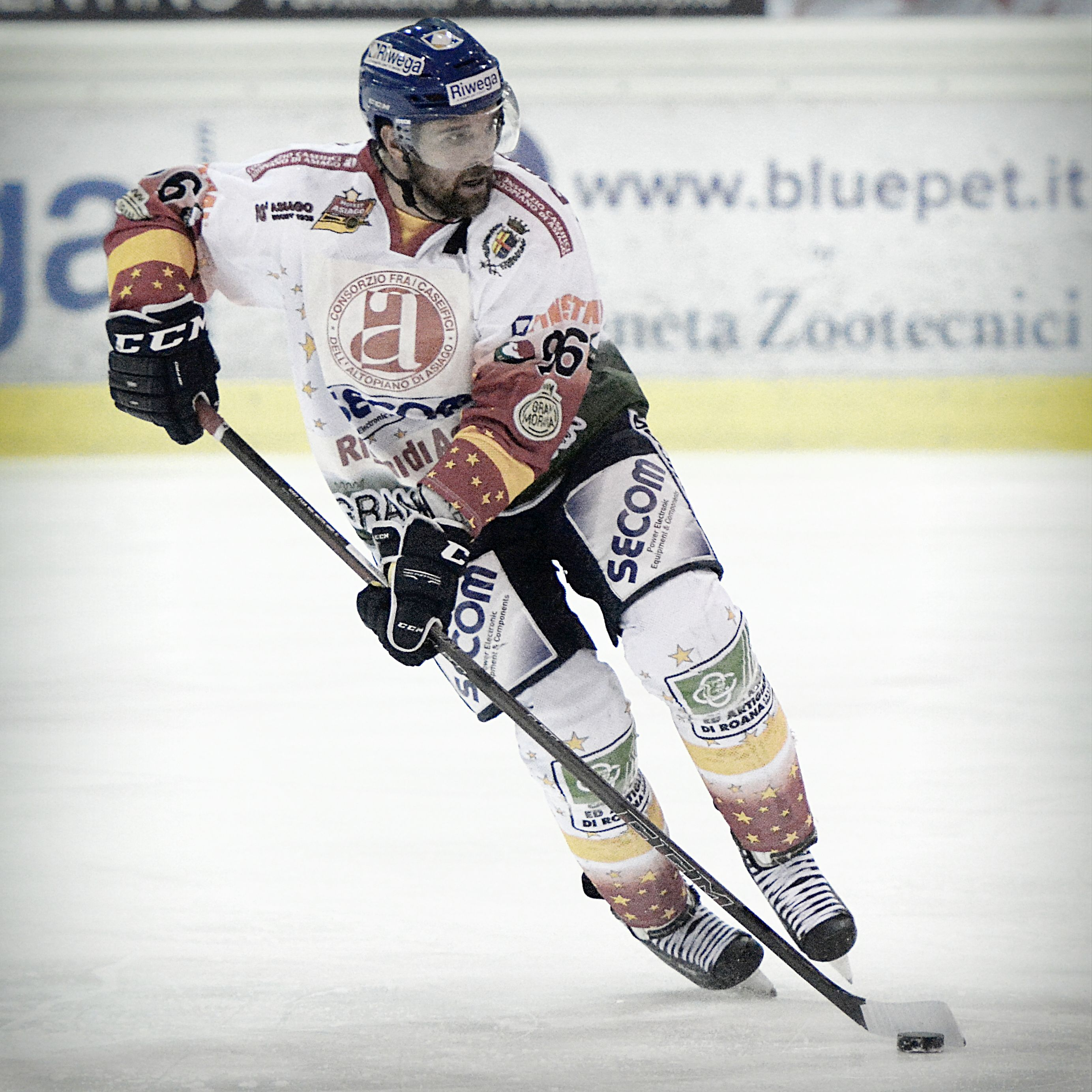
- Born: February 6, 1976 (age 50) Asiago, Italy
- Height: 6 ft 4 in (193 cm)
- Weight: 223 lb (101 kg; 15 st 13 lb)
- Position: Defence
- Shot: Left
- Played for: Asiago HC; Sportivi Ghiaccio Cortina; HC Milano
- National team: Italy
- Playing career: 1993–2015

Michele Strazzabosco (born February 6, 1976) is an Italian former ice hockey defenseman. He played for two decades in the top Italian ice hockey league (Serie A) and was a member of the Italian national ice hockey team for a dozen years, including at the 2006 Winter Olympics in Turin. Strazzabosco is considered one of the top native players in Italian ice hockey history.

== Serie A ==
Strazzabosco debuted in Italy's Serie A at the age of 17 in the 1993–94 season, playing for his hometown Asiago HC. He played there for 12 seasons before joining the H.C.J. Milano Vipers in 2005–06.

In the 2008–09 season, Strazzabosco joined Sportivi Ghiaccio Cortina. He went back to Asiago HC the following season, where he played until retiring at the end of the 2014–15 season.

He played in 793 games in Italy's top league during his career, tallying 68 goals and adding 211 assists. He also played in 89 playoff games, scoring 9 goals and 23 assists.

During his career, Strazzabosco was part of five Italian league championships for his hometown team, in addition to a championship with Milano. He also participated in three IIHF Continental Cup tournaments with Asiago HC, including a third-place finish in 2013–14.

== National Hockey League ==
At the age of 30, Strazzabosco was offered a tryout from the National Hockey League's Buffalo Sabres prior to the 2006–07 NHL season. On September 19, he became the first Italian-trained player to appear in an NHL preseason game. Wearing No. 24 and paired with Sabres defenseman Michael Funk, Strazzabosco played just over 13 minutes in the game, a 4–1 loss to the Columbus Blue Jackets. He spent two minutes in the penalty box for a hooking call.

Strazzabosco and Italian goaltender Thomas Tragust, who participated in the Sabres' developmental camp, had been recommended to Buffalo by goalie coach Jim Corsi and scout Jon Christiano. Corsi had been an assistant coach for the Italian national team during the 2006 Olympics, while Christiano was an assistant for Italy at that year's World Championships. According to Corsi, Strazzabosco had also attracted interest from the Detroit Red Wings and Vancouver Canucks.

Buffalo Sabres general manager Darcy Regier, however, opted not to sign Strazzabosco to a contract for either Buffalo or their American Hockey League affiliate, the Rochester Americans. During his time with the Sabres organization, Strazzabosco said team co-captain Chris Drury was one of his biggest influences.

== International ==
Stazzabosco represented Italy at the highest level internationally in 170 games from 1998 to 2010, including 12 World Championships and the 2006 Winter Olympics, which the nation hosted. He also played in two European Junior Championships and three World Junior Championships.

In the 2006 IIHF World Championship, he scored a game-tying goal in Italy's final match, against Slovenia, that saved the team from being relegated. Another memorable goal came when he scored against the Canadian team in the 2010 IIHF World Championship.

Strazzabosco was expected to be part of Italy's team at the 2011 IIHF World Championship; however, he was removed from the team's roster along with two Asiago teammates (Enrico Miglioranzi and Federico Benetti) after they missed a training session following a late-night party celebrating Asiago's league championship.

== Personal ==
Following his playing career, Strazzabosco became a commentator for Asiago HC's streaming platform, Asiago.TV.

== Career statistics ==
=== Regular season and playoffs ===
			Regular season					Playoffs
Season	Team	League	GP	G	A	Pts	PIM	GP	G	A	Pts	PIM
1993–94	HC Asiago	ITA	9	0	1	1	8	—	—	—	—	—
1994–95	HC Asiago	ITA	33	2	7	9	62	—	—	—	—	—
1995–96	Rayside–Balfour Sabrecats	NOJHL	26	6	21	27	43	—	—	—	—	—
1996–97	HC Asiago	ITA.2	16	1	3	4	14	—	—	—	—	—
1997–98	HC Asiago	ITA	43	4	7	11	112	—	—	—	—	—
1998–99	HC Asiago	ITA	29	4	4	8	87	—	—	—	—	—
1999–2000	HC Asiago	ITA	46	11	22	33	60	—	—	—	—	—
2000–01	HC Asiago	ITA	37	1	13	14	71	10	2	4	6	24
2001–02	HC Asiago	ITA	38	2	5	7	87	4	0	0	0	2
2002–03	HC Asiago	ITA	38	3	8	11	108	11	1	0	1	14
2003–04	HC Asiago	ITA	42	2	9	11	46	11	1	2	3	49
2004–05	HC Asiago	ITA	33	1	7	8	62	9	2	4	6	26
2005–06	Milano Vipers	ITA	47	5	10	15	80	7	1	3	4	12
2006–07	Milano Vipers	ITA	32	6	13	19	77	9	2	2	4	20
2007–08	Milano Vipers	ITA	38	2	11	13	58	9	1	0	1	18
2008–09	SG Cortina	ITA	42	4	17	21	52	4	0	2	2	4
2009–10	HC Asiago	ITA	40	4	12	16	92	15	2	3	5	30
2010–11	HC Asiago	ITA	40	2	10	12	62	17	1	3	4	16
2011–12	HC Asiago	ITA	44	2	8	10	88	4	0	0	0	6
2012–13	HC Asiago	ITA	36	4	15	19	26	15	1	5	6	14
2013–14	HC Asiago	ITA	40	3	9	12	38	11	0	3	3	8
2014–15	HC Asiago	ITA	17	0	5	5	10	18	0	2	2	12
ITA totals			724	62	193	255	1286	154	14	33	47	255

=== International ===
Year	Team	Event	Result	GP	G	A	Pts	PIM
1992	Italy	EJC B	1st (B)	5	0	0	0	8
1993	Italy	WJC B	3rd (B)	5	0	0	0	4
1993	Italy	EJC	8th	6	0	1	1	4
1994	Italy	WJC B	5th (B)	7	1	1	2	8
1994	Italy	EJC B	5th (B)	4	1	1	2	22
1995	Italy	WJC B	8th (B)	7	2	0	2	20
1996	Italy	WJC B	5th (B)	6	0	0	0	10
1998	Italy	WC	10th	6	0	1	1	2
1999	Italy	WC	13th	3	0	0	0	0
1999	Italy	WC Q	Q	3	0	0	0	2
2000	Italy	OGQ	DNQ	3	0	3	3	2
2000	Italy	WC	12th	5	0	0	0	10
2001	Italy	WC	12th	6	0	0	0	6
2002	Italy	WC	15th	6	0	0	0	2
2003	Italy	WC D1	4th (D1)	5	0	2	2	4
2004	Italy	WC D1	2nd (D1)	5	1	3	4	4
2005	Italy	WC D1	1st (D1)	5	0	2	2	4
2006	Italy	OG	11th	5	0	0	0	10
2006	Italy	WC	14th	6	1	0	1	18
2007	Italy	WC	12th	6	0	1	1	6
2008	Italy	WC	16th	4	0	1	1	10
2009	Italy	OGQ	DNQ	3	0	1	1	10
2009	Italy	WC D1	1st (D1)	5	0	2	2	2
2010	Italy	WC	15th	6	2	0	2	10
Junior totals				40	4	3	7	76
Senior totals				82	4	16	20	104
