= Cristiani =

Cristiani is a surname. Notable people with the surname include:

- Alfredo Cristiani (born 1947), President of El Salvador
- Federico Cristiani (born 2005), Italian para swimmer
- Gabriella Cristiani (born 1949), Italian film editor
- Giovanni di Bartolomeo Cristiani, Tuscan painter
- Quirino Cristiani (1896–1984), Argentine animation director
- Stefano Cristiani (born 1958), Italian astronomer
- Tony Cristiani, American football player
