= Anthony Cristiano =

Canadian film director

Anthony Cristiano is an Italian-born Canadian film director, educator, and writer.

As a film director, Cristiano's style is chiefly characterized by a poetic tone via the use of raw film texture, counterpointed use of music, and psychologically meandering situations and characters. This style is manifested in his DVD titled "A Self-Conscious Mise-en-scene", which is released in 2008 and consists of 10 short films he made between the years 1998–2008. The DVD collection was later presented and screened by Cristiano in a special lecture at the Frank Iacobucci Centre in University of Toronto.

Cristiano is also a film scholar. For several years, he has been a workshop instructor at various film co-operatives across Canada. In 2006, Cristiano gave a lecture and led workshops on experimental films for Atlantic Filmmakers Cooperative (AFCOOP) at the National Film Board of Canada in Halifax. In 2007, he instructed the first session of a Masterclass Workshop Series led by Island Media Arts Cooperative in Prince Edward Island. In 2010, he was a workshop instructor for the Liaison of Independent Filmmakers of Toronto (LIFT). From the springs of 2013 to 2015, Cristiano has hosted an Italian Film Series of public screening as part of the Culture, Arts, and Entertainment programs of the Toronto Reference Library. On 27 March 2014 Cristiano gave a public lecture titled "The Incidence of Screens: an Extension of Human Abilities or a Historic Distraction?" as part of the Laurier Milton Lecture Series V at the Milton Public Library, in which he discussed the relevance of McLuhan laws of media and axioms and argued that there is evidence of harm, especially among young users, caused by the addiction to personal devices. Cristiano also gave a public talk on Canadian practices, "Digital Technologies & Surveillance Practices: Do they protect or harm us?" at the Brantford Public Library on May 13, 2015. On May 26, 2015, Cristiano also gave a talk on the dangers associated with digitization and new media trends given to Nicolaus Copernicus University in Toruń (Toruń, Poland) students.

== Short films ==
Cristiano's flair as a writer and poet is translated into his short films to capture the bewilderment of everyday life. For example, his short films Il mio umore (2000) and Intervalli chiaroscuri (2002) are based on his homonymous poems. In Infinitely Near (1999), which appeared at the 30th Student Film & Video Festival of Montreal World Film Festival, Cristiano explores the issues of everyday life and human relationship through the mathematical concept of limit. The character of the mathematics professor in Infinitely Near was played by Patrick O'Donnell, a physics professor at University of Toronto, who also appeared in Gus Van Sant's Good Will Hunting. Cristiano also uses short film to express his scholarly ideas. Screened in New York, his A Matter of Style discusses cinematic theory as the dialogue between two different styles of chair. A Self-Conscious Mise-en-scene(2006) is based on Cristiano's short story "The Millenary Man". In his scholarly article about this short film, titled "A Self-Conscious Mise-en-scène: Experimenting with 'Disownment and Appropriation'", Cristiano explains his experimental work as a way to solve a communicative crisis. On May 28, 2015, "A Minute Life (1-20)" film screened at Collegium Maius, Toruǹ (Poland).

== Filmography ==
=== Short films ===
- Voiceless Lilies (1998)
- Infinitely Near (1999)
- Il mio umore (2000)
- Sera di settembre (2001)
- Intervalli chiaroscuri (2002)
- Displaced Love (2003)
- La risata (2005)
- A Matter of Style (2005)
- A Self-Conscious Mise-en-scene (2006)
- 316 Albany Avenue (2008)
- A Minute Life (2014)

=== Feature film ===
- The Wave Canadiana Blue (2011)

== Bibliography ==
In 2010 he authored Dante Alighieri's Inferno Metaphor: The Revised Interlinear Edition + 5 novi canti by Anthony Cristiano With Illustrations., and the book also contains 30 original illustrations by Cristiano. As part of the book launch in Toronto, Cristiano gave a lecture titled "Modernism and Visuality in Dante's Inferno Journey".
Cristiano's other writings include: The Adolescent (2000), The Graviton, The Millenary Man (2002), and "A Self-Conscious Mise-en-scene: Experimenting with Disownment and Appropriation" (2007), Contemporary Italian Cinema: Images of Italy at the Turn of the Century (2008).

== Art ==
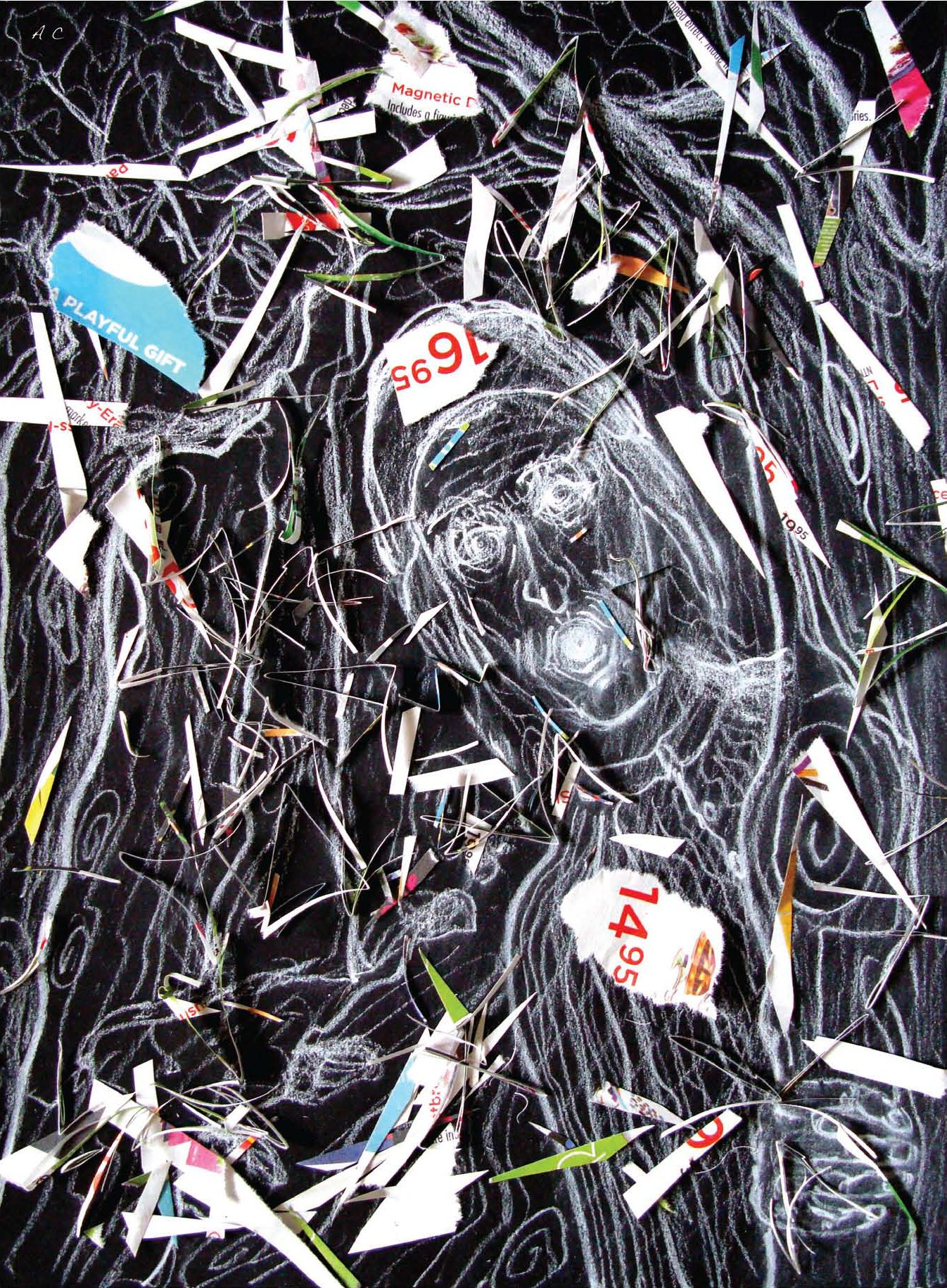
Inf I 1-.3 Pilgrim Dante in dark forest, Anthony Cristiano, white chalk; shreds from advertisement flyers

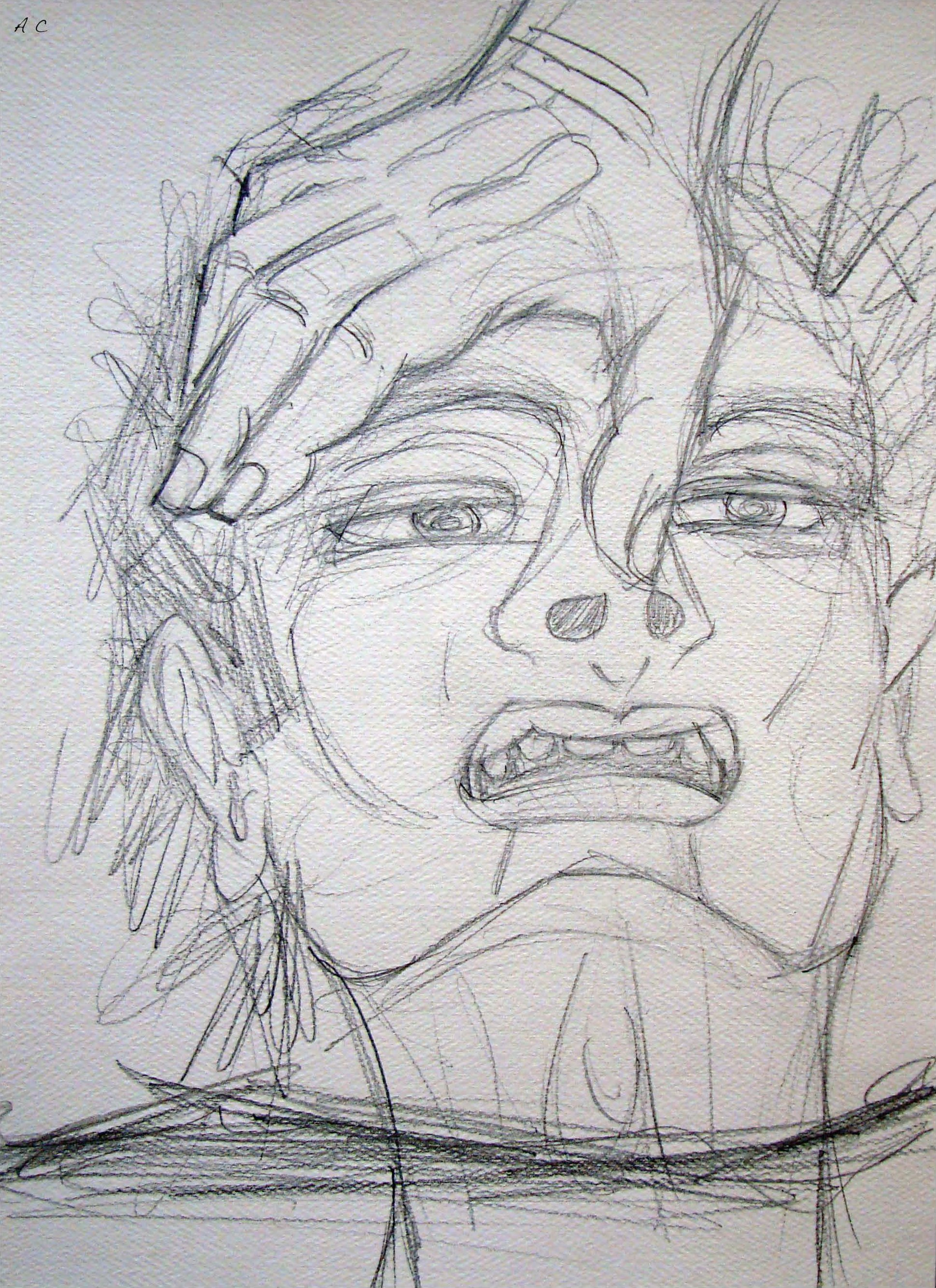
Inf VIII 52-63 Revenge on Filippo Argenti, Anthony Cristiano, pencil drawing

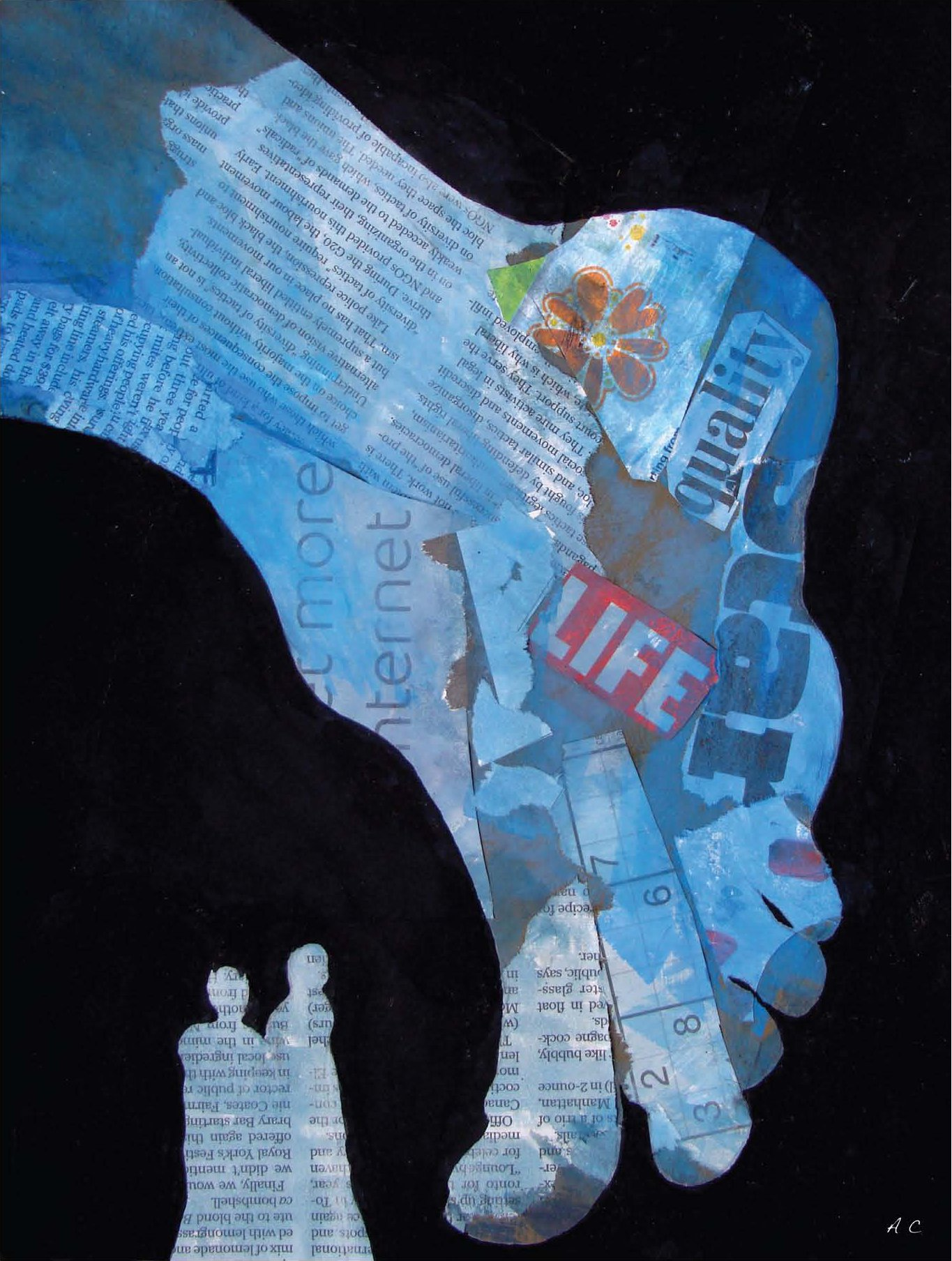
Inf XXXI 34-51, Virgil and the Dante meet Giants, Anthony Cristiano, watercolours; paper pieces and cutouts
