= Cristiano Gomes =

Cristiano Gomes may refer to:

- Cristiano Gomes (footballer, born 1985), Brazilian footballer
- Cristiano Gomes (footballer, born 1994), Portuguese footballer
