= Cristiano Ronaldo (disambiguation) =

Cristiano Ronaldo (born 1985) is a Portuguese professional footballer.

Cristiano Ronaldo may also refer to:

- Cristiano Ronaldo Jr. (born 2010), son of the Portuguese international footballer, and forward for Al-Nassr's youth academy
- Cristiano Ronaldo: The World at His Feet, 2014 Spanish documentary film
- Cristiano Ronaldo International Airport, an international airport in Madeira, Portugal
- Cristiano Ronaldo Campus Futebol, the campus of Estádio da Madeira

== See also ==
- Ronaldo (film), 2015 British documentary film
- Cristiano (disambiguation)
- Ronaldo (name)
- CR7 (disambiguation)
