= Ross Wardle =

- Born: Ross Wardle; 28 April 1991 (age 35) Cardiff, Wales
- Height: 188 cm (6 ft 2 in)
- Weight: 101 kg (15 st 13 lb)

Rugby union career
- Position: Wing
Senior career
Years	Team	Apps	(Points)
2012–2016	Newport Gwent Dragons	50	(60)
- Correct as of 28 December 2022

Ross Wardle (born 28 April 1991) is a retired Welsh rugby union player. Wardle played primarily for the Newport Gwent Dragons regional team as a winger, as well as Bedwas RFC.

Wardle scored a try on his debut for Newport Gwent Dragons on 10 November 2012 versus Bath.

During the 2013–14 Pro12 season, Wardle was the Dragons top try scorer, touching down seven times. He suffered a serious knee injury near the end of the season.

After sustaining a knee injury in 2016, Wardle retired from professional rugby, taking up a career as a pharmacist. He later returned to the game with Bedwas, the side where he began his career.
