= Stefano Cristiani =

Italian astronomer and astrophysicist

Stefano Vittorio Giovanni Cristiani (born 4 November 1958) is an Italian astronomer and astrophysicist.

== Career ==
Cristiani graduated in Physics at the University of Rome La Sapienza, carrying out his thesis work at the Asiago Astrophysical Observatory. He held a post-doctoral and staff positions at the European Southern Observatory, La Silla Observatory, University of Padua, and Trieste Astronomical Observatory. He has been director of the Trieste Astronomical Observatory from 2005 to 2010 and a member of the Board of INAF from 2011 to 2013.

The main areas of his research are: extragalactic astronomy, cosmology, formation and evolution of galaxies, quasars, advanced data analysis methods.

== Honours ==
Awards 1976, 1977, 1978, 1979: Enrico Persico award of the Accademia dei Lincei
