= Giovanni di Bartolomeo Cristiani =

Italian painter

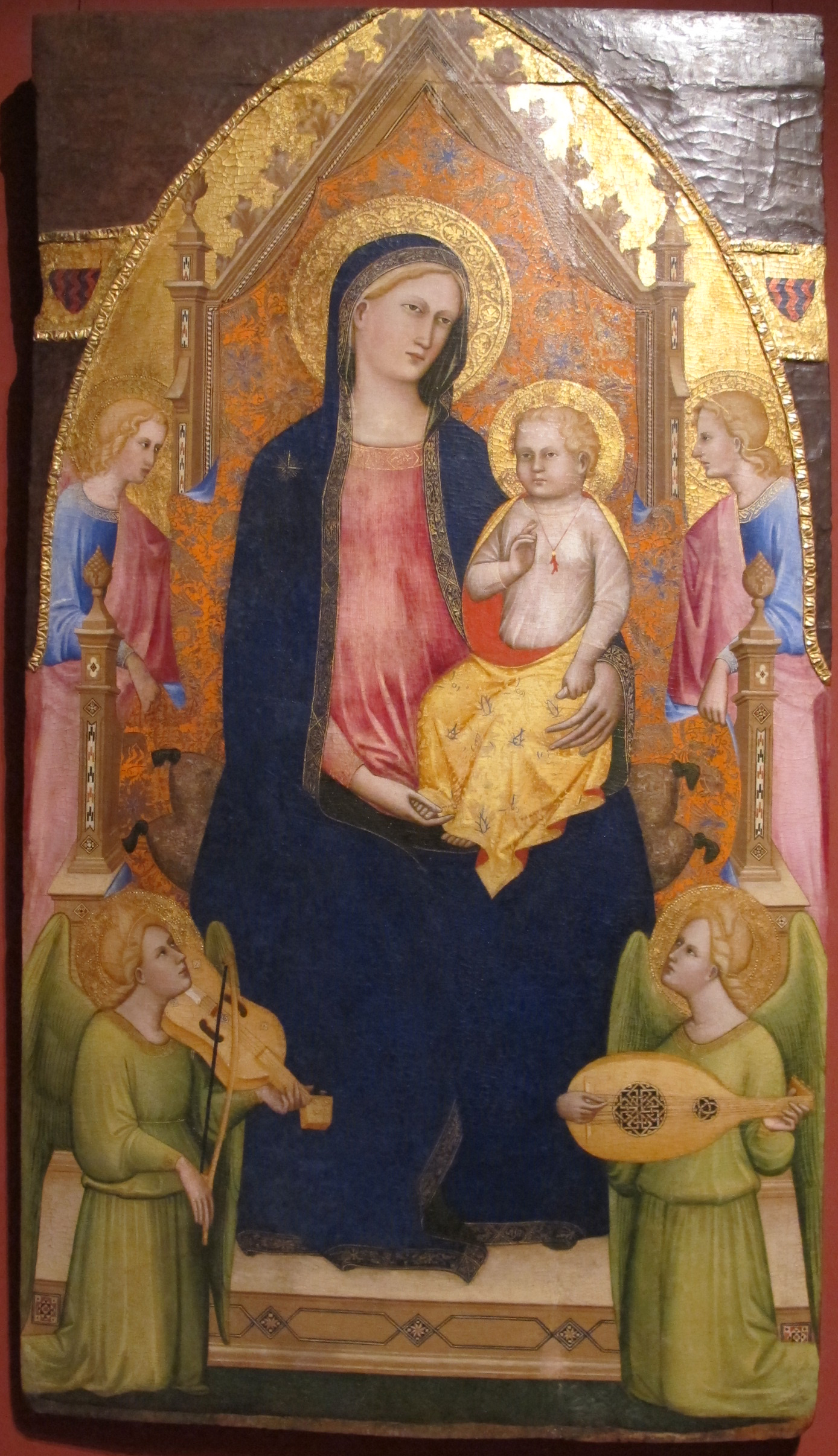
Maestà, Pushkin Museum, Moscow

Giovanni di Bartolomeo Cristiani was an Italian painter active in Pistoia and Pisa in the second half of the 14th century.

Originally from Pistoia, Cristiani is documented in Florence in 1366. His career is mainly situated in Pistoia and Pisa. The last records about the artist date to 1398. His style points to a training in Pistoia. His work also shows the influence of the Florentine master Niccolò di Tommaso, who had himself worked in Pistoia. Nardo di Cione also seems to have left a mark on Cristiani's style.

He is thought by Ciampi to have been employed at the Campo Santo of Pisa in 1382. He is known to have painted a 'Virgin and Child between SS. Nicholas and John the Baptist' in the Oratorio dei Nerli at Montemurlo. His last work, which is now lost, was the decoration of a church in Pistoia, which was begun in 1396 and finished in 1398.

Very little remains of this artist's productions, and no exact date is known of his death. In the Sacristy of San Giovanni Evangelista at Pistoia, there is a painting by him of 'St. John the Baptist enthroned with Angels' (1370). A fragmentary panel by the artist is in the church of San Michele at Crespina, near Pisa.
