= Andrew McMenemy =

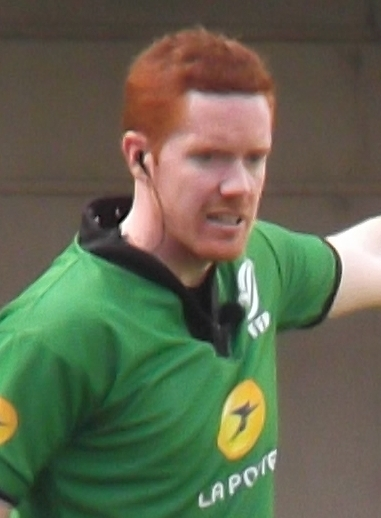
- Born: Andrew McMenemy; 7 August 1984 (age 42) Galashiels, Scotland

Rugby union career
Amateur team(s)
Years	Team	Apps	(Points)
- Gala
Refereeing career
Years	Competition		Apps
- Scottish Premiership
2010-15	Celtic League		

Andrew McMenemy (born 7 August 1984) is an ex professional rugby union referee who represents the Scottish Rugby Union. He now serves as a Television Match Official for the Pro14.

== Rugby union career ==
=== Playing career ===
==== Amateur career ====
McMenemy played for Gala.

=== Referee career ===
==== Professional career ====
McMenemy's first ever game he refereed was Kelso U18s v Musselburgh U18s.

He became a professional referee in 2010.

McMenemy refereed in the Scottish Premiership.

His final game as a professional referee was in the Pro12 on 1 March 2015 when Connacht played Benetton Treviso.

==== International career ====
He was in the panel of referees for the 2008 Rugby Union Junior World Championship; five years later also as head referee. He also gained experience in female test matches, including the 2010 World Cup. At the representative level, he made his debut in the Georgia-Romania match in March 2009 in the 2008 European Nations Cup of Nations 2008-2010 and in the following years he also appeared in this competition. In addition to conducting representation meetings, he was also a line judge. He was a TMO at the Women’s Rugby World Cup 2025.

== Outside of rugby ==
He played cricket for Gala Cricket Club and captained the side in 2004.

McMenemy was originally a Fire Prevention Engineer.
