= Cristiano Gomes (footballer, born 1985) =

Brazilian footballer (born 1985)

Cristiano Gomes Machado (born 20 February 1985) is a Brazilian former professional footballer who played as a defender.

== Teams ==
- Atlético Mineiro 2005
- Danubio 2006–2008
- Cerro Largo 2009–2010
- Cerrito 2010–
