= Jeff Hassler =

Canada rugby union player (born 1991)

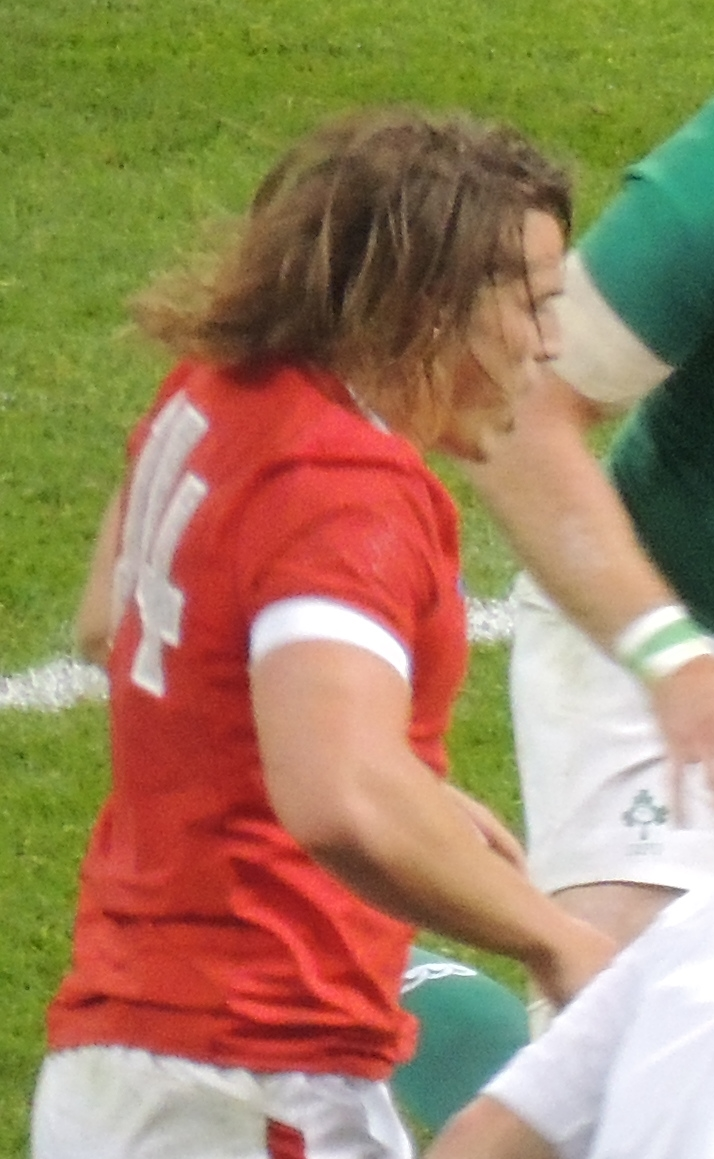
- Born: Jeffrey Scott Hassler; 21 August 1991 (age 35) Calgary, Alberta, Canada
- Height: 178 cm (5 ft 10 in)
- Weight: 99 kg (15 st 8 lb; 218 lb)
- University: University of Saskatchewan

Rugby union career
- Position(s): Wing, Centre
Amateur team(s)
Years	Team	Apps	(Points)
- Foothills Lions
–	James Bay AA		
Senior career
Years	Team	Apps	(Points)
2013–2018	Ospreys	88	(125)
2019-	Seattle Seawolves	16	(40)
- Correct as of 9 September 2019
Provincial / State sides
Years	Team	Apps	(Points)
2011-2012,2018-	Prairie Wolf Pack		
International career
Years	Team	Apps	(Points)
2010–2011	Canada U20	8	(40)
2012–	Canada	36	(55)
- Correct as of 9 September 2019
National sevens team
Years	Team		Comps
2012–2013	Canada		

Jeff Hassler (born 21 August 1991) is a Canadian rugby union player. He plays at wing and occasionally at the centre position for the Seattle Seawolves in Major League Rugby (MLR), and Rugby Canada's National 15s. He has 36 caps for the National squad in all contests, and former member of the Neath-Swansea, Ospreys.

Hassler is an Alberta native having attended Holy Trinity Academy in the southern foothill town of Okotoks. As a youth he excelled at all sports but in particular Canadian football and Rugby.

In his rookie year as an Osprey, he appeared in seventeen matches and notched 8 tries earning him a spot on the RaboDirect Dream Team. In addition, Hassler was voted by fans and peers as Team Canada's 15's player of the year for the 2014 season. Although injury sidelined him for the majority of the 14/15 campaign, Hassler scored 6 tries in eleven appearances with the Ospreys in what was a frustrating campaign in all Guinness Pro14 (formerly Pro12) and European Cup Competitions. On 10 May 2019, it was announced that Hassler signed with the Seattle Seawolves of Major League Rugby.

== Early career ==
Hassler played both Canadian football and Rugby as a youth where he developed a propensity for a powerful and dynamic running style having excelled at running back in Pee Wee, Bantam, Midget and High School Football. Hassler's aggressive play caught the attention of multiple CIS (Canadian Interuniversity Sport) programs and after deliberation he would go on to commit to the University of Saskatchewan Huskies Men's football program.

During his stint as a Huskey, he was selected to represent Team World in the 2010 IFAF International Federation of American Football game vs the USA.

Huskies Individual Career Statistics

Rushing	Games	att	Yards	TD	Long	avg/c	avg/g
2009	4	45	367	5	49	8.2	91.8
2010	2	20	177	1	69	8.9	88.5
Total	6	65	544	6	69	8.4	90.7

Receiving	Games	Rec	Yards	TD	Long	rec/g	avg/c	avg/g
2009	4	7	127	1	49	1.8	18.1	31.8
2010	2	2	41	0	22	1.0	20.5	20.5
Total	6	9	168	1	49	1.5	18.7	28.0

Kick Returns	Games	no.	Yards	TD	Long	avg/r	avg/g
2009	4	3	119	0	86	39.7	29.8
2010	2	1	25	0	25	25.0	12.5
Total	6	4	144	0	86	36.0	24.0

All Purpose	Games	Rush	RCV	PR	KR	IR	Total	Avg/g
2009	4	367	127	0	119	0	613	153.2
2010	2	177	41	0	25	0	243	121.5
Total	6	544	168	0	144	0	856	142.7

== Professional rugby career and statistics ==
National Team Senior Men's XV's Statistics

Hassler has represented Canada internationally at the U17, U20 and Senior Men's XV's level and also in the HSBC Sevens World Series. He made his debut on the Sevens circuit in Feb 2012 and later that summer with the Senior Men's XV's vs the USA. At the end of the autumn internationals in 2014, Hassler suffered a serious knee injury that sidelined him for the majority of the remaining season. He has since gone on to represent Canada in two Rugby World Cups.

Season	Team	MP	TOT	TR	PK	C	DG	YC	RC	CAPS	NCAPS
2012	Canada	5	10	2	0	0	0	0	0	4	1
2013	Canada	3	5	1	0	0	0	0	0	2	1
2014	Canada	4	5	1	0	0	0	0	0	4	0
2015	Canada	0	0	0	0	0	0	0	0	0	0
Career totals	Canada	12	20	4	0	0	0	0	0	10	2

Hassler signed with the Ospreys in 2013, and extended his stay with a three-year deal that would see him as a member of the club until the end of the 2017 campaign. He had started the 2014/15 year with a bang, co-leading the team in tries through seven games before injuring his knee in an international friendly. He returned to play on 8 May 2015 versus the Glasgow Warriors. Despite having multiple season ending injuries during his time with the Ospreys Hassler's tough style of play never wavered to the delight of his fans.

Competition	Team	Played	Tries	Points
2014–2015 – Guinness PRO12 Total	Ospreys	9	5	25
2013–2014 – RaboDirect PRO12 Total	Ospreys	17+3	8	40
Total – Guinness PRO12	Ospreys	26+3	13	65
2014/2015 European Rugby Champions Cup	Ospreys	2	1	5
2013/2014 Heineken Cup	Ospreys	5+1	0	0
