= Cristiano André =

Angolan judge

Cristiano André is an Angolan judge who was the Chief Justice of the Supreme Court of Angola from 1997 to 2014.
