= Cristiano Vasconcelos =

Portuguese footballer

Personal information
- Full name: Cristiano Pinto Vasconcelos
- Date of birth: 10 July 1989 (age 37)
- Place of birth: Funchal, Portugal
- Height: 1.85 m (6 ft 1 in)
- Position: Defender

Team information
- Current team: Andorinha

Youth career
- 1998–2004: Marítimo
- 2004–2005: Barreirense
- 2005–2006: Marítimo
- 2006–2007: 1º Maio Funchal
- 2007–2008: Marítimo

Senior career*
Years	Team	Apps	(Gls)
2008–2018	Marítimo B	106	(6)
2013	→ AD Oliveirense (loan)	6	(0)
2018–2019	União Madeira	20	(3)
2020	Os Xavelhas	2	(0)
2020–	Andorinha		
- * Club domestic league appearances and goals as of 21:17, 25 January 2021 (UTC)

Cristiano Pinto Vasconcelos (born 10 July 1989) is a Portuguese footballer who plays for CF Andorinha as a defender.

== Career ==
On 18 May 2013, Vasconcelos made his professional debut with Marítimo B in a 2012–13 Segunda Liga match against Aves.
