= Cristiano Camillucci =

Italian professional football player (born 1981)

Personal information
- Date of birth: March 7, 1981 (age 45)
- Place of birth: Terni, Italy
- Height: 1.79 m (5 ft 10 in)
- Position: Midfielder

Team information
- Current team: UC Sinalunghese

Senior career*
Years	Team	Apps	(Gls)
2000–2001	Cesi	33	(7)
2001–2004	Sambenedettese	34	(0)
2004–2007	Sansovino	94	(1)
2007–2008	Sangiovannese	17	(0)
2008	→ Ancona (loan)	2	(0)
2008–2010	Ancona	38	(0)
2010–2011	Alessandria	32	(1)
2011–2012	Sorrento	34	(0)
2012–2014	Empoli	11	(0)
2014	Cuneo	5	(0)
2014–2015	Ancona	24	(1)
2015–2017	Sangiovannese	58	(3)
2017–2019	Sangiustese	60	(6)
2019–	UC Sinalunghese	0	(0)
- * Club domestic league appearances and goals

Cristiano Camillucci (born March 7, 1981) is an Italian professional football player. He currently plays for UC Sinalunghese.

== Biography ==
In January 2008 he joined Ancona. After Ancona was expelled from the professional league, he joined Alessandria in 1-year contract.

On 9 July 2011 he was signed by Sorrento along with Daniele Croce. Camillucci himself was offered a 1-year deal.

Camillucci joined UC Sinalunghese ahead of the 2019/20 season.
