= Angela Christiano =

Molecular geneticist

Angela M. Christiano
- Education: Rutgers University (BS, MS, PhD)
- Awards: National Academy of Sciences
- Scientific career
- Fields: Dermatology; Genetics; Stem cells
- Workplaces: Columbia University
- Thesis: The human tropoelastin gene: Allelic heterogeneity, evolutionary divergence, identification of restriction fragment length polymorphisms and linkage analyses in families with pseudoxanthoma elasticum
- Doctoral advisor: Charles D. Boyd

Angela M. Christiano is a molecular geneticist in the field of dermatology. Her research focuses on genes involved in hair and skin growth, as well as treatments for hair loss and skin cancers. She is the Richard and Mildred Rhodebeck Professor of Dermatology and Professor of Genetics and Development at Columbia University Vagelos College of Physicians and Surgeons.

== Education and early career ==
Christiano attended Nutley High School in Nutley, New Jersey. She attended Douglass College, a women-only residential college within Rutgers University-New Brunswick, earning her Bachelor of Science degree in 1987. She continued her scientific training at Rutgers University, earning her Master of Science in Molecular Pathology and Doctor of Philosophy in Genetics. As a postdoctoral researcher in the Jefferson Medical College Department of Dermatology, Christiano focused on genetic blistering skin diseases.

== Research ==
Christiano established her laboratory at Columbia University in 1996.

=== Genes driving alopecia areata ===
Alopecia areata is an autoimmune disease where a patient's immune cells attack their own hair follicles, causing hair to fall out in clumps. In collaboration with the National Alopecia Areata Foundation (NAAF), Christiano and her group were able to compare genomes between patients and healthy control individuals.

In 2009, Christiano and her group published the discovery of 139 genetic markers linked to alopecia areata. Although many expected that genes involved in alopecia would also be involved in other inherited hair and skin diseases, they found that genes linked to alopecia were linked to other types of autoimmune diseases instead: type-1 diabetes, rheumatoid arthritis, and celiac disease.

==== Potential implications for cancer therapy ====
In patients with alopecia, one of the genes that are hyperactive is IKZF1, which results in overproduction of immune cells that subsequently attack hair follicles. In contrast, many cancer cells escape detection and elimination by immune cells. Scientists in the Christiano Lab were able to activate IKZF1 in certain cancer types, e.g. melanoma, and suppress tumor growth.

=== Strategies for growing human hair ===
In addition to her efforts in understanding the genetics behind alopecia, Christiano is also researching ways to treat it and other types of hair loss. Most therapies focus on stopping or slowing down hair loss, while hair transplantation simply moves one part of the scalp to another. Christiano's goal is to grow human hair in lab settings that could be then transplanted onto human scalp with minimal scarring. Although mouse and rat hair easily grow in lab, the methods do not work as well when growing human hair. In 2013, Christiano and her group adapted the hanging drop cell culture technique to grow human cells that successfully grew human hair when transplanted onto the backs of nude mice. In 2015, Christiano and her group found that a class of drugs called JAK inhibitors promoted hair follicles to enter growth phase. In 2019, Christiano and colleagues developed a "hair farm", using a 3D-printed scaffold as a microenvironment to grow human skin cells and produce hair.

== Honors and awards ==
- Elected member, National Academy of Sciences (2020)
- William Montagna Lectureship from the Society for Investigative Dermatology (2009)

== Personal life ==
Christiano is the first member in her family to attend college and graduate school. Hair has been an integral part of her family, as her grandfather was a barber and her mother was retired hairdresser. In her first year of establishing her lab, Christiano started experiencing hair loss and was diagnosed with alopecia areata. While it was known that alopecia areata is genetic, it was not well understood which genes were involved and how they worked. Christiano decided to use her scientific training to address this gap in knowledge.
