= Liaison of Independent Filmmakers of Toronto =

- Abbreviation: LIFT
- Founded: 1981
- Type: Non-profit organization
- Headquarters: Toronto, Ontario, Canada
- Region served: Canada
- Official language: English
- Website: https://lift.ca

The Liaison of Independent Filmmakers of Toronto (or LIFT) is an artist-run charitable organization based in Toronto, Ontario, Canada. It provides resources such as classes, production space and discounted production equipment for filmmaking and photography.

== Background ==
LIFT was founded in 1981 by a small collective of independent artists. In 2012, they celebrated their 30th anniversary. They are funded by and associated with the Canada Council for the Arts, Ontario Arts Council, Ontario Arts Foundation, Ontario Trillium Foundation and the Toronto Arts Council. The facilities have been used by filmmakers such as Atom Egoyan, Bruce McDonald and Midi Onodera. Their facilities are in the vicinity of major media production hubs such as Ubisoft and Wallace Film Studios. The facilities still have a large focus on traditional film cinematography and photography as opposed to digital production.

== Notable projects ==
LIFT provided essential support for the development of an animated series based on Karleen Pendleton Jiménez's memoir, How to Get a Girl Pregnant.
