= Neil Paterson (rugby union) =

- Born: Neil Paterson; 9 August 1975 (age 51) Belfast, Northern Ireland
- Height: 1.83 m (6 ft 0 in)
- Weight: 86 kg (13 st 8 lb)
- Occupation: Rugby union referee

Rugby union career
- Position: Fly-half
Amateur team(s)
Years	Team	Apps	(Points)
-	Malone		
–	Dundee HSFP		
International career
Years	Team	Apps	(Points)
-	Scotland Universities		
Refereeing career
Years	Competition		Apps
-	Scottish Premiership		
2006-	Celtic League		
–	European Challenge Cup		29

Neil Paterson (born 9 August 1975) is a professional rugby union referee who represents the Scottish Rugby Union. He now serves as a Television Match Official for the Pro14, and in international matches.

== Rugby union career ==
=== Playing career ===
==== Amateur career ====
Paterson started playing rugby union in Northern Ireland. He played for Malone RFC in Belfast.

On moving to Scotland, Paterson then turned out for Dundee HSFP. A fly-half, he was top scorer for the club in seasons 2000-01 and 2002-03.

His playing career highlight was captaining the Scottish University team against the English University team. Scotland won the match.

=== Referee career ===
==== Professional career ====
In Scotland he joined the Midlands Society of the SRU.

His first game in charge was Fife Southern 2XV v Stirling County 3XV in December 2003.

Paterson has refereed in the Scottish Premiership.

He made his Celtic League debut in 2006 when Cardiff Blues played Connacht on 18 November.

He has refereed in the European Challenge Cup, making 29 appearances.

He refereed his first 1872 Cup match on 26 December 2008.

He won the SRU Referee of the Season in 2010-11.

==== International career ====
He made his representative debut in 2007 when Czech Republic played Spain.

== Outside of rugby ==
Paterson is a dentist.
