= Jon Christiano =

American former ice hockey coach

Jon Christiano (born July 8, 1958) is an American former ice hockey coach. He was an assistant coach in the National Hockey League with the Buffalo Sabres during the 1998–99 NHL season.

Born in Buffalo, New York, Christiano is currently employed by the Buffalo Sabres as their Director of Professional Scouting.
