= Filippo Cristiano =

Italian rugby union player (born 1987)

- Born: 13 March 1987 (age 39) Turin, Italy
- Height: 1.88 m (6 ft 2 in)
- Weight: 102 kg (16 st 1 lb; 225 lb)

Rugby union career
- Position: Flanker
- Current team: Fiamme Oro
Youth career
- CUS Torino
Senior career
Years	Team	Apps	(Points)
2006−2009	Calvisano	18	(0)
2009−2011	I Cavalieri Prato	40	(15)
2011−2012	Rovigo Delta	22	(5)
2011	→ Aironi	-	(-)
2012−2016	Zebre	66	(20)
2016−2021	Fiamme Oro	65	(10)
- Correct as of 27 May 2020
International career
Years	Team	Apps	(Points)
2012	Emerging Italy	3	(0)
- Correct as of 27 May 2020

Filippo Cristiano (born 13 March 1987) is an Italian retired rugby union player. His usual position was as a Flanker. From May 2023 he is Team Manager for Fiamme Oro.

From 2012 to 2016 he played for Zebre.

In 2013 Cristiano was named in the Emerging Italy squad for 2013 IRB Nations Cup.
