= 2011–12 Edinburgh Rugby season =

Edinburgh 2011 / 2012
- Ground(s): Murrayfield Stadium (Capacity: 67,130)
- CEO: (Scotland) Craig Docherty
- Coach(es): (Ireland) Michael Bradley
- Captain(s): (Scotland) Greig Laidlaw
- Most caps: (Scotland) Roddy Grant(28)
- Top scorer: (Scotland) Greig Laidlaw (250)
- Most tries: (Scotland) Tim Visser (13)
- League(s): Pro12
1st kit	2nd kit

The 2011–12 season was Edinburgh Rugby's eleventh season competing in the Pro12.

Michael Bradley took over Edinburgh in the summer of 2011. He previously had been in charge of Connacht and Ireland A.

While domestically the season never really took off, the 2011–12 Heineken Cup campaign proved to be the most successful in the club's history by topping Pool 2. Along the way, competing in the remarkable 48-47 match against Racing Métro and setting up a quarter final against French rugby giants Toulouse by scoring 4 tries against London Irish. The game itself was very tight, with Edinburgh holding out for a 19–14 win thanks to an early try from Mike Blair and penalties from captain Greig Laidlaw, setting up a semi-final in Dublin against Ulster.

2011 saw the introduction of numerous youngster into the squad this season, which makes the results even more astonishing. Début seasons for regular starters, 21-year-olds Matt Scott and Grant Gilchrist as well as 19-year-old Harry Leonard. And first full season for back row pair Stuart McInally and David Denton.

More than 37 881 fans, a UK record crowd for a Heineken Cup quarter final, witnessed Edinburgh become the first Scottish club to reach the Heineken Cup semi-final.

== Squad List ==
Note: Flags indicate national union under World Rugby eligibility rules. Players may hold more than one non-World Rugby nationality.

Player	Position	Union
Ross Ford	Hooker	Scotland
Andrew Kelly	Hooker	Scotland
Steven Lawrie	Hooker	Scotland
Geoff Cross	Prop	Scotland
Jack Gilding	Prop	Scotland
Allan Jacobsen	Prop	Scotland
Lewis Niven	Prop	Scotland
Kyle Traynor	Prop	Scotland
Sean Cox	Lock	England
Esteban Lozada	Lock	Argentina
Steven Turnbull	Lock	Scotland
Roddy Grant	Flanker	Scotland
Alan MacDonald	Flanker	Scotland
Ross Rennie	Flanker	Scotland
David Denton	Flanker	Scotland
Stuart McInally	Flanker	Scotland
Netani Talei	Number 8	Fiji

Player	Position	Union
Mike Blair	Scrum-half	Scotland
Greig Laidlaw	Scrum-half	Scotland
Chris Leck	Scrum-half	England
Phil Godman	Fly-half	Scotland
Ben Cairns	Centre	Scotland
Nick De Luca	Centre	Scotland
John Houston	Centre	Scotland
James King	Centre	Scotland
Lee Jones	Wing	Scotland
Tim Visser	Wing	Netherlands
Sep Visser	Wing	Netherlands
Simon Webster	Wing	Scotland
Tom Brown	Fullback	Scotland
Chris Paterson	Fullback	Scotland
Jim Thompson	Fullback	Scotland

== Transfers 2011/2012 ==
=== Players in ===
- Steven Lawrie from Doncaster
- Matthew Scott - Currie RFC
- Sean Cox - Sale Sharks
- Chris Leck - Sale Sharks
- Alex Black - Leeds Carnegie
- Sep Visser - Tynedale R.F.C. (will have dual registration with Boroughmuir RFC)

=== Players out ===
- Fraser McKenzie - Sale Sharks
- Scott Macleod - Kobelco Steelers
- David Blair - Retired
- Craig Hamilton - Tarbes
- Mark Robertson - Scotland 7s
- Scott Newlands - Oyonnax
- David Young - Leeds Carnegie
- Simon Webster - Retired

== Pro 12 League Table ==
Pro12 Table
Pos	Team	Pld	W	D	L	PF	PA	PD	TF	TA	TB	LB	Pts	Qualification (Note: Qualification for the Heineken Cup is based on each country's allocation, i.e. three highest-ranked Irish teams, three highest-ranked Welsh teams, both Italian teams and both Scottish teams. Because Leinster won the 2012 Heineken Cup Final, Ireland earned an extra Heineken Cup place, which will go to Connacht. Aironi were denied a licence for the 2012–13 season due to financial issues; the newly established Zebre side replaced Aironi in the Pro12 and Heineken Cup.)
1	(Ireland) Leinster (F)	22	18	1	3	568	326	+242	48	28	5	2	81	Play-off place
2	(Wales) Ospreys (C)	22	16	1	5	491	337	+154	44	22	2	3	71	Play-off place
3	(Ireland) Munster (SF)	22	14	1	7	489	367	+122	45	27	5	4	67	Play-off place
4	(Scotland) Glasgow Warriors (SF)	22	13	4	5	445	321	+124	34	23	2	3	65	Play-off place
5	(Wales) Scarlets	22	12	2	8	446	373	+73	43	30	5	5	62	
6	(Ireland) Ulster	22	12	0	10	474	424	+50	53	41	5	3	56	
7	(Wales) Cardiff Blues	22	10	0	12	446	460	−14	43	45	5	5	50	
8	(Ireland) Connacht	22	7	1	14	321	433	−112	27	36	0	7	37	
9	(Wales) Newport Gwent Dragons	22	7	1	14	370	474	−104	27	41	1	5	36	
10	(Italy) Benetton Treviso	22	7	0	15	419	558	−139	41	57	3	5	36	
11	(Scotland) Edinburgh	22	6	1	15	454	588	−134	42	65	2	4	32	
12	(Italy) Aironi	22	4	0	18	289	551	−262	22	54	1	5	22	

Updated to match(es) played on 5 May 2012. Source: RaboDirect PRO12
Rules for classification: If teams are level at any stage, tiebreakers are applied in the following order:
1. number of matches won;
2. the difference between points for and points against;
3. the number of tries scored;
4. the most points scored;
5. the difference between tries for and tries against;
6. the fewest red cards received;
7. the fewest yellow cards received.
  (C) Champions; (F) Lost in the final; (SF) Lost in the semi-finals
  Notes:

== Heineken Cup ==
=== Pool stage ===
Team	P	W	D	L	Tries for	Tries against	Try diff	Points for	Points against	Points diff	TB	LB	Pts
(Scotland) Edinburgh	6	5	0	1	17	11	+6	156	138	+18	2	0	22
(Wales) Cardiff Blues	6	5	0	1	9	5	+4	145	110	+35	0	1	21
(France) Racing Métro	6	1	0	5	13	19	−6	160	190	−30	1	4	9
(England) London Irish	6	1	0	5	7	11	−4	116	139	−23	1	4	9

=== Quarter-finals ===
7 April 2012
15:00 BST

Edinburgh (Scotland)	19–14	(France) Toulouse
Try: Blair 1' c Con: Laidlaw (1/1); Pen: Laidlaw (3/4) 46', 51', 80'; Drop: Laidlaw (1/1) 38'	Report	Try: Matanavou 30' m Pen: Beauxis (3/5) 5', 19', 28'

Murrayfield Stadium, Edinburgh
Attendance: 37,881
Referee: Nigel Owens (Wales)

=== Semi-finals ===
28 April 2012
17:45 IST

Ulster (Ireland)	22–19	(Scotland) Edinburgh
Try: Wannenburg 15' c Con: Pienaar (1/1); Pen: Pienaar (5/5) 5', 38', 58', 63', 75'	Report	Try: Thompson 80' c Con: Laidlaw (1/1); Pen: Laidlaw (4/4) 9', 11', 40', 45'

Aviva Stadium, Dublin
Attendance: 45,147
Referee: Romain Poite (France)
