= 2010–11 Edinburgh Rugby season =

Edinburgh 2010 / 2011
- Ground(s): Murrayfield Stadium (Capacity: 67,130)
- Coach(es): (Scotland) Rob Moffat
- Captain(s): (Scotland) Roddy Grant
- Top scorer: (Scotland) Chris Paterson (133 pts.)
- Most tries: (Netherlands) Tim Visser (14 tries)
- League(s): Celtic League
1st kit	2nd kit

During the 2010–11 season, the Edinburgh Rugby team came 8th out of the 12 teams in the PRO12 league, and played in the pool stage of the Heineken Cup.

== Squad list ==
Note: Flags indicate national union under World Rugby eligibility rules. Players may hold more than one non-World Rugby nationality.

Player	Position	Union
Fraser Brown	Hooker	Scotland
Sean Crombie	Hooker	Scotland
Ross Ford	Hooker	Scotland
Finlay Gillies	Hooker	Scotland
Andrew Kelly	Hooker	Scotland
Alun Walker	Hooker	Scotland
Geoff Cross	Prop	Scotland
Jack Gilding	Prop	Scotland
Robin Hislop	Prop	Scotland
Allan Jacobsen	Prop	Scotland
Nicky Little	Prop	Scotland
Lewis Niven	Prop	Scotland
Colin Philips	Prop	Scotland
Kyle Traynor	Prop	Scotland
Dave Young	Prop	Ireland
Grant Gilchrist	Lock	Scotland
Craig Hamilton	Lock	Scotland
Esteban Lozada	Lock	Argentina
Scott Macleod	Lock	Scotland
Fraser McKenzie	Lock	Scotland
Steven Turnbull	Lock	Scotland
Struan Dewar	Flanker	Scotland
Roddy Grant	Flanker	Scotland
Alan MacDonald	Flanker	Scotland
Scott Newlands	Flanker	Scotland
Ross Rennie	Flanker	Scotland
David Denton	Number 8	Scotland
Netani Talei	Number 8	Fiji

Player	Position	Union
Mike Blair	Scrum-half	Scotland
Greig Laidlaw	Scrum-half	Scotland
Ross Samson	Scrum-half	Scotland
Alex Blair	Fly-half	Scotland
David Blair	Fly-half	Scotland
Phil Godman	Fly-half	Scotland
Gregor Hunter	Fly-half	Scotland
David Bishop	Centre	Wales
Ben Cairns	Centre	Scotland
Nick De Luca	Centre	Scotland
Andrew Easson	Centre	Scotland
Alex Grove	Centre	Scotland
John Houston	Centre	Scotland
James King	Centre	Scotland
Chris Bloomfield	Wing	England
Lee Jones	Wing	Scotland
Andrew Turnbull	Wing	Scotland
Tim Visser	Wing	Netherlands
Simon Webster	Wing	Scotland
Mark Robertson	Wing	Scotland
Tom Brown	Fullback	Scotland
Chris Paterson	Fullback	Scotland
Jim Thompson	Fullback	Scotland

== PRO12 League table ==
	Team	Pld	W	D	L	PF	PA	PD	TF	TA	Try bonus	Losing bonus	Pts
1	(Ireland) Munster	22	19	0	3	496	327	+169	44	22	5	2	83
2	(Ireland) Leinster	22	15	1	6	495	336	+159	50	25	5	3	70
3	(Ireland) Ulster	22	15	1	6	480	418	+62	44	35	3	2	67
4	(Wales) Ospreys	22	12	1	9	553	418	+135	56	29	6	7	63
5	(Wales) Scarlets	22	12	1	9	503	453	+50	49	43	5	7	62
6	(Wales) Cardiff Blues	22	13	1	8	479	392	+87	37	33	3	3	60
7	(Wales) Newport Gwent Dragons	22	10	1	11	444	462	−18	47	49	3	4	49
8	(Scotland) Edinburgh	22	9	0	13	421	460	−39	39	44	2	5	43
9	(Ireland) Connacht	22	7	1	14	394	459	−65	32	44	3	6	39
10	(Italy) Benetton Treviso	22	9	0	13	374	502	−128	29	58	0	2	38
11	(Scotland) Glasgow Warriors	22	6	1	15	401	543	−142	33	48	1	6	33
12	(Italy) Aironi	22	1	0	21	247	517	−270	21	52	0	8	12
Under the standard bonus point system, points are awarded as follows: 4 points for a win; 2 points for a draw; 1 bonus point for scoring 4 tries (or more) (Try bonus); 1 bonus point for losing by 7 points (or fewer) (Losing bonus)
Green background (rows 1 to 4) are play-off places. Correct as of 7 May 2011. Source: RaboDirect PRO12
