= 2012–13 Edinburgh Rugby season =

Edinburgh 2012 / 2013
- Ground: Murrayfield Stadium (Capacity: 67,130)
- CEO: (Scotland) Craig Docherty
- Coach: (Ireland) Michael Bradley
- Captain: (Scotland) Greig Laidlaw
- Most caps: (Scotland) Greig Tonks(29)
- Top scorer: (Scotland) Greig Laidlaw (156)
- Most tries: (Scotland) Tim Visser (10)
- League: Pro12
1st kit	2nd kit

The 2012–13 season was Edinburgh Rugby's twelfth season competing in the Pro12.

== Squad list ==
Hookers (Scotland) Ross Ford (Scotland) Steven Lawrie (England) Andy Titterrell (Scotland) Alun Walker Props (Scotland) Geoff Cross (Scotland) Allan Jacobsen (South Africa) W. P. Nel (Scotland) Lewis Niven (Wales) John Yapp Locks (England) Sean Cox (England) Perry Parker (Scotland) Steven Turnbull (South Africa) Izak van der Westhuizen (Scotland) Grant Gilchrist	Loose forwards (Georgia (country)) Dimitri Basilaia (Scotland) David Denton (Scotland) Roddy Grant (Scotland) Stuart McInally (Scotland) Ross Rennie (Fiji) Netani Talei Half backs (Scotland) Alex Black (England) Chris Leck (Wales) Richie Rees (Scotland) Greig Laidlaw (C) (Scotland) Harry Leonard (England) Piers Francis	Centres (New Zealand) Ben Atiga (Scotland) Ben Cairns (Scotland) Nick De Luca (Scotland) John Houston (Scotland) James King (Scotland) Matt Scott Back Three (Scotland) Tom Brown (Scotland) Lee Jones (England) Mike Penn (Netherlands) Sep Visser (Scotland) Tim Visser (South Africa) Greig Tonks*

== Heineken Cup ==
Team	P	W	D	L	PF	PA	Diff	TF	TA	TB	LB	Pts
(England) Saracens (3)	6	5	0	1	180	76	+104	15	6	2	1	23
(Ireland) Munster (8)	6	4	0	2	133	73	+60	14	4	2	2	20
(France) Racing Métro	6	3	0	3	103	125	−22	7	11	0	0	12
(Scotland) Edinburgh	6	0	0	6	36	178	−142	3	18	0	0	0

13 October 2012
13:35

Edinburgh (Scotland)	0–45	(England) Saracens (1 BP)
	Report	Try: Tomkins 13' c Farrell 59' m Ashton 65' c Goode 68' c Hodgson 75' c Con: Hodgson (4/5); Pen: Hodgson (4/4) 23', 30', 39', 50'

Murrayfield, Edinburgh
Attendance: 6,543
Referee: John Lacey (Ireland)

21 October 2012
12:45

(1 BP) Munster (Ireland)	33–0	(Scotland) Edinburgh
Try: Murray 50' c P. O'Mahony 70' c Dougall 73' m Varley 80' m Con: Keatley (2/4); Pen: Keatley (3/5) 3', 23', 56'	Report

Thomond Park, Limerick
Attendance: 22,146
Referee: Wayne Barnes (England)

8 December 2012
19:00

Racing Métro (France)	19–9	(Scotland) Edinburgh
Try: Imhoff 19' m Ben Arous 60' m Pen: Barkley (2/2) 10', 30'; Machenaud (1/1) 77'	Report	Pen: Laidlaw (3/6) 1', 39', 65'

Stade Yves-du-Manoir, Colombes
Attendance: 6,873
Referee: Peter Fitzgibbon (Ireland)

14 December 2012
20:00

Edinburgh (Scotland)	3–15	(France) Racing Métro
Pen: Francis (1/5) 28'	Report	Pen: Barkley (1/2) 4'; Germain (4/5) 7', 53', 61', 68'

Murrayfield, Edinburgh
Attendance: 4,598
Referee: Dudley Phillips (Ireland)

13 January 2013
12:45

Edinburgh (Scotland)	17–26	(Ireland) Munster
Try: Fife (2) 71' c, 76' c Con: Laidlaw (2/2); Pen: Laidlaw (1/1) 32'	Report	Try: penalty try 53' c Murray 61' c Con: O'Gara (2/2); Pen: O'Gara (4/5) 2', 25', 29', 35'

Murrayfield, Edinburgh
Attendance: 6,220
Referee: Romain Poite (France)

== Transfers 2012/2013 ==
=== Players in ===
- (Wales) John Yapp from (Wales) Cardiff Blues
- (South Africa) W. P. Nel from (South Africa) Cheetahs
- (South Africa) Izak van der Westhuizen from (South Africa) Cheetahs
- (England) Perry-John Parker from (England) Esher
- (Georgia (country)) Dimitri Basilaia from (France) Valence d’Agen
- (Wales) Richie Rees from (Wales) Cardiff Blues
- (South Africa) Greig Tonks from (England) Northampton
- (New Zealand) Ben Atiga from (New Zealand) Otago
- (England) Mike Penn from (England) Nottingham

=== Players out ===
- (Scotland) Kyle Traynor
- (Scotland) Andrew Kelly
- (England) Jack Gilding
- (Argentina) Esteban Lozada to (France) Agen
- (Scotland) Alan MacDonald
- (Scotland) Mike Blair to (France) Brive
- (Scotland) Phil Godman to (England) London Scottish
- (Scotland) Jim Thompson to (England) London Scottish
- (Scotland) Chris Paterson Retired
