= 2011–12 Pro12 =

- Countries: Ireland; Italy; Scotland; Wales
- Date: 2 September 2011 – 27 May 2012
- Champions: (Wales) Ospreys (4th title)
- Runners-up: (Ireland) Leinster
- Matches played: 135
- Attendance: 1,042,374 (average 7,721 per match)
- Tries scored: 484 (average 3.6 per match)
- Top point scorer: Dan Biggar (Ospreys) (257 points)
- Top try scorer: Tim Visser (Edinburgh) (13 tries)

Official website
- www.rabodirectpro12.com

The 2011–12 Pro12 League (also known as the RaboDirect Pro12 for sponsorship reasons) was the 11th season of the rugby union competition originally known as the Celtic League, the second with its current 12-team format, and also the first with RaboDirect as title sponsor.

The twelve teams competing were the four Irish provinces, Munster, Leinster, Connacht and Ulster; two Scottish regions, Edinburgh Rugby and Glasgow Warriors; four Welsh regions, Cardiff Blues, Newport Gwent Dragons, Ospreys and Scarlets; and two Italian clubs Aironi and Benetton Treviso.

The competition was won by Ospreys, who defeated Leinster in the final 31–30.

== Teams ==
| Location of 2011–12 Pro12 teams in Great Britain and Ireland. | Location of 2011–12 Pro12 teams in Italy |
Winners; 2nd–4th place; Other teams.

| Team | Coach | Captain | Stadium | Capacity |
|---|---|---|---|---|
| (Italy) Aironi | (Wales) Rowland Phillips | (Italy) Quintin Geldenhuys | Stadio Luigi Zaffanella | 6,000 |
| (Italy) Benetton Treviso | (South Africa) Franco Smith | (Italy) Antonio Pavanello | Stadio Comunale di Monigo | 6,700 |
| (Wales) Cardiff Blues | (Wales) Gareth Baber (Wales) Justin Burnell | (New Zealand) Paul Tito | Cardiff City Stadium (Note: Cardiff Blues played two of their matches back in their traditional Cardiff Arms Park home.) | 26,828 |
| (Ireland) Connacht | (Ireland) Eric Elwood | (Ireland) Gavin Duffy | Galway Sportsgrounds | 7,500 |
| (Scotland) Edinburgh | (Ireland) Michael Bradley | (Scotland) Greig Laidlaw | Murrayfield Stadium | 67,144 (Note: Although Murrayfield's full capacity is 67,144, only the lower section of the West Stand, with a capacity of 12,464, is generally opened for Edinburgh fixtures.) |
| (Scotland) Glasgow Warriors | (Scotland) Sean Lineen | (Scotland) Alastair Kellock | Firhill Stadium | 10,887 |
| (Ireland) Leinster | (New Zealand) Josef Schmidt | (Ireland) Leo Cullen | RDS Arena; Aviva Stadium | 18,500; 51,700 |
| (Ireland) Munster | (Australia) Tony McGahan | (Ireland) Paul O'Connell | Thomond Park; Musgrave Park | 26,500; 9,251 |
| (Wales) Newport Gwent Dragons | (Wales) Darren Edwards | (New Zealand) Tom Willis | Rodney Parade | 11,676 |
| (Wales) Ospreys | (Australia) Scott Johnson | (Wales) Alun Wyn Jones | Liberty Stadium | 20,532 |
| (Wales) Scarlets | (Wales) Nigel Davies | (Wales) Matthew Rees | Parc y Scarlets | 14,870 |
| (Ireland) Ulster | (Ireland) Brian McLaughlin | (South Africa) Johann Muller | Ravenhill | 12,300 |

== Table ==
Pro12 Table
| Pos | Team | Pld | W | D | L | PF | PA | PD | TF | TA | TB | LB | Pts | Qualification (Note: Qualification for the Heineken Cup is based on each country's allocation, i.e. three highest-ranked Irish teams, three highest-ranked Welsh teams, both Italian teams and both Scottish teams. Because Leinster won the 2012 Heineken Cup Final, Ireland earned an extra Heineken Cup place, which will go to Connacht. Aironi were denied a licence for the 2012–13 season due to financial issues; the newly established Zebre side replaced Aironi in the Pro12 and Heineken Cup.) |
|---|---|---|---|---|---|---|---|---|---|---|---|---|---|---|
| 1 | (Ireland) Leinster (F) | 22 | 18 | 1 | 3 | 568 | 326 | +242 | 48 | 28 | 5 | 2 | 81 | Play-off place |
| 2 | (Wales) Ospreys (C) | 22 | 16 | 1 | 5 | 491 | 337 | +154 | 44 | 22 | 2 | 3 | 71 | Play-off place |
| 3 | (Ireland) Munster (SF) | 22 | 14 | 1 | 7 | 489 | 367 | +122 | 45 | 27 | 5 | 4 | 67 | Play-off place |
| 4 | (Scotland) Glasgow Warriors (SF) | 22 | 13 | 4 | 5 | 445 | 321 | +124 | 34 | 23 | 2 | 3 | 65 | Play-off place |
| 5 | (Wales) Scarlets | 22 | 12 | 2 | 8 | 446 | 373 | +73 | 43 | 30 | 5 | 5 | 62 | |
| 6 | (Ireland) Ulster | 22 | 12 | 0 | 10 | 474 | 424 | +50 | 53 | 41 | 5 | 3 | 56 | |
| 7 | (Wales) Cardiff Blues | 22 | 10 | 0 | 12 | 446 | 460 | −14 | 43 | 45 | 5 | 5 | 50 | |
| 8 | (Ireland) Connacht | 22 | 7 | 1 | 14 | 321 | 433 | −112 | 27 | 36 | 0 | 7 | 37 | |
| 9 | (Wales) Newport Gwent Dragons | 22 | 7 | 1 | 14 | 370 | 474 | −104 | 27 | 41 | 1 | 5 | 36 | |
| 10 | (Italy) Benetton Treviso | 22 | 7 | 0 | 15 | 419 | 558 | −139 | 41 | 57 | 3 | 5 | 36 | |
| 11 | (Scotland) Edinburgh | 22 | 6 | 1 | 15 | 454 | 588 | −134 | 42 | 65 | 2 | 4 | 32 | |
| 12 | (Italy) Aironi | 22 | 4 | 0 | 18 | 289 | 551 | −262 | 22 | 54 | 1 | 5 | 22 | |

Updated to match(es) played on 5 May 2012. Source: RaboDirect PRO12
Rules for classification: If teams are level at any stage, tiebreakers are applied in the following order:
1. number of matches won;
2. the difference between points for and points against;
3. the number of tries scored;
4. the most points scored;
5. the difference between tries for and tries against;
6. the fewest red cards received;
7. the fewest yellow cards received.
  (C) Champions; (F) Lost in the final; (SF) Lost in the semi-finals
  Notes:

== Fixtures ==
All times are local.

=== Round 1 ===
2 September 2011
19:05

| Ospreys (Wales) | 27 – 3 | (Ireland) Leinster |
| | Report |

Liberty Stadium, Swansea
Attendance: 5,424
Referee: Peter Fitzgibbon

2 September 2011
19:05

| Ulster (Ireland) | 28 – 14 | (Scotland) Glasgow Warriors |
| | Report |

Ravenhill, Belfast
Attendance: 6,296
Referee: Leighton Hodges

2 September 2011
19:30

| Edinburgh (Scotland) | 15 – 38 | (Wales) Cardiff Blues (1 BP) |
| | Report |

Murrayfield Stadium, Edinburgh
Attendance: 2,431
Referee: Leo Colgan

3 September 2011
15:00

| (1 BP) Benetton Treviso (Italy) | 9 – 11 | (Ireland) Connacht |
| | Report |

Stadio Comunale di Monigo, Treviso
Attendance: 3,100
Referee: Dudley Phillips

3 September 2011
19:45

| Munster (Ireland) | 20 – 12 | (Wales) Newport Gwent Dragons |
| | Report |

Musgrave Park, Cork
Attendance: 7,252
Referee: Stefano Penne

4 September 2011
16:00

| Scarlets (Wales) | 32 – 9 | (Italy) Aironi |
| | Report |

Parc y Scarlets, Llanelli
Attendance: 6,493
Referee: Andrew McMenemy

=== Round 2 ===
9 September 2011
19:30

| Glasgow Warriors (Scotland) | 12 – 23 | (Ireland) Munster |
| | Report |

Firhill Stadium, Glasgow
Attendance: 2,914
Referee: Dudley Phillips

9 September 2011
19:35

| Leinster (Ireland) | 31 – 10 | (Wales) Newport Gwent Dragons |
| | Report |

RDS Arena, Dublin
Attendance: 14,362
Referee: Andrew Macpherson

10 September 2011
15:00

| (1 BP) Aironi (Italy) | 19 – 25 | (Ireland) Ulster |
| | Report |

Stadio Luigi Zaffanella, Viadana
Attendance: 3,000
Referee: Neil Hennessy

10 September 2011
15:15

| Connacht (Ireland) | 13 – 11 | (Wales) Scarlets (1 BP) |
| | Report |

Galway Sportsgrounds, Galway
Attendance: 3,408
Referee: Marius Mitrea

10 September 2011
18:30

| Ospreys (Wales) | 26 – 19 | (Scotland) Edinburgh (1 BP) |
| | Report |

Liberty Stadium, Swansea
Attendance: 5,179
Referee: David Wilkinson

11 September 2011
15:45

| (1 BP) Cardiff Blues (Wales) | 33 – 18 | (Italy) Benetton Treviso |
| | Report |

Cardiff City Stadium, Cardiff
Attendance: 4,847
Referee: Andrew McMenemy

=== Round 3 ===
16 September 2011
19:05

| Ulster (Ireland) | 20 – 3 | (Wales) Cardiff Blues |
| | Report |

Ravenhill, Belfast
Attendance: 6,555
Referee: James Jones

16 September 2011
19:30

| Edinburgh (Scotland) | 19 – 14 | (Ireland) Connacht (1 BP) |
| | Report |

Murrayfield Stadium, Edinburgh
Attendance: 2,364
Referee: Alan Falzone

17 September 2011
15:00

| (1 BP) Benetton Treviso (Italy) | 27 – 32 | (Wales) Ospreys |
| | Report |

Stadio Comunale di Monigo, Treviso
Attendance: 3,000
Referee: Neil Hennessy

17 September 2011
18:00

| (1 BP) Leinster (Ireland) | 19 – 23 | (Scotland) Glasgow Warriors |
| | Report |

RDS Arena, Dublin
Attendance: 14,686
Referee: Andrew McMenemy

17 September 2011
18:30

| Newport Gwent Dragons (Wales) | 23 – 14 | (Italy) Aironi |
| | Report |

Rodney Parade, Newport
Attendance: 4,197
Referee: Leo Colgan

17 September 2011
19:45

| (1 BP) Munster (Ireland) | 35 – 12 | (Wales) Scarlets |
| | Report |

Musgrave Park, Cork
Attendance: 7,648
Referee: Andrew Macpherson

=== Round 4 ===
23 September 2011
19:05

| (1 BP) Cardiff Blues (Wales) | 13 – 18 | (Ireland) Munster |
| | Report |

Cardiff City Stadium, Cardiff
Attendance: 5,466
Referee: David Wilkinson

23 September 2011
19:30

| Connacht (Ireland) | 17 – 13 | (Wales) Newport Gwent Dragons (1 BP) |
| | Report |

Galway Sportsgrounds, Galway
Attendance: 3,706
Referee: Leighton Hodges

23 September 2011
19:30

| (1 BP) Glasgow Warriors (Scotland) | 13 – 15 | (Italy) Benetton Treviso |
| | Report |

Firhill Stadium, Glasgow
Attendance: 2,864
Referee: Alan Falzone

24 September 2011
15:00

| Aironi (Italy) | 25 – 19 | (Scotland) Edinburgh (1 BP) |
| | Report |

Stadio Luigi Zaffanella, Viadana
Attendance: 2,500
Referee: Peter Allan

24 September 2011
18:30

| (1 BP) Scarlets (Wales) | 10 – 15 | (Ireland) Leinster |
| | Report |

Parc y Scarlets, Llanelli
Attendance: 8,823
Referee: John Lacey

25 September 2011
16:30

| Ospreys (Wales) | 32 – 14 | (Ireland) Ulster |
| | Report |

Liberty Stadium, Swansea
Attendance: 5,590
Referee: Dudley Phillips

=== Round 5 ===
30 September 2011
19:05

| Newport Gwent Dragons (Wales) | 22 – 9 | (Ireland) Ulster |
| | Report |

Rodney Parade, Newport
Attendance: 4,554
Referee: Neil Paterson

30 September 2011
19:30

| Edinburgh (Scotland) | 29 – 14 | (Ireland) Munster |
| | Report |

Murrayfield Stadium, Edinburgh
Attendance: 3,467
Referee: Leighton Hodges

30 September 2011
19:30

| Ospreys (Wales) | 26 – 21 | (Ireland) Connacht (1 BP) |
| | Report |

Liberty Stadium, Swansea
Attendance: 5,726
Referee: Stefano Penne

1 October 2011
15:00

| Benetton Treviso (Italy) | 20 – 10 | (Wales) Scarlets |
| | Report |

Stadio Comunale di Monigo, Treviso
Attendance: 3,200
Referee: David Wilkinson

1 October 2011
18:00

| (1 BP) Leinster (Ireland) | 26 – 7 | (Italy) Aironi |
| | Report |

RDS Arena, Dublin
Attendance: 14,920
Referee: Marius Mitrea

1 October 2011
18:30

| Cardiff Blues (Wales) | 13 – 34 | (Scotland) Glasgow Warriors (1 BP) |
| | Report |

Cardiff City Stadium, Cardiff
Attendance: 8,198
Referee: John Lacey

=== Round 6 ===
7 October 2011
19:05

| (1 BP) Scarlets (Wales) | 33 – 17 | (Scotland) Edinburgh |
| | Report |

Parc y Scarlets, Llanelli
Attendance: 6,188
Referee: Dudley Phillips

7 October 2011
19:05

| Ulster (Ireland) | 12 – 23 | (Italy) Benetton Treviso |
| | Report |

Ravenhill, Belfast
Attendance: 7,372
Referee: Stefano Penne

7 October 2011
19:30

| Glasgow Warriors (Scotland) | 24 – 19 | (Wales) Newport Gwent Dragons (1 BP) |
| | Report |

Firhill Stadium, Glasgow
Attendance: 2,705
Referee: Marius Mitrea

8 October 2011
15:00

| (1 BP) Aironi (Italy) | 26 – 37 | (Wales) Cardiff Blues (1 BP) |
| | Report |

Stadio Luigi Zaffanella, Viadana
Attendance: 3,000
Referee: Neil Hennessy

8 October 2011
17:00

| Leinster (Ireland) | 30 – 20 | (Ireland) Connacht |
| | Report |

RDS Arena, Dublin
Attendance: 15,220
Referee: Peter Fitzgibbon

8 October 2011
19:30

| (1 BP) Munster (Ireland) | 13 – 17 | (Wales) Ospreys |
| | Report |

Thomond Park, Limerick
Attendance: 16,599
Referee: James Jones

=== Round 7 ===
28 October 2011
19:05

| Glasgow Warriors (Scotland) | 28 – 17 | (Wales) Ospreys |
| | Report |

Firhill Stadium, Glasgow
Attendance: 3,443
Referee: Carlo Damasco

28 October 2011
19:35

| Edinburgh (Scotland) | 28 – 36 | (Ireland) Leinster |
| | Report |

Murrayfield Stadium, Edinburgh
Attendance: 3,580
Referee: Leighton Hodges

28 October 2011
20:30

| Munster (Ireland) | 18 – 6 | (Italy) Aironi |
| | Report |

Musgrave Park, Cork
Attendance: 8,742
Referee: Peter Allan

29 October 2011
15:00

| (1 BP) Benetton Treviso (Italy) | 50 – 24 | (Wales) Newport Gwent Dragons |
| | Report |

Stadio Comunale di Monigo, Treviso
Attendance: 4,700
Referee: John Lacey

29 October 2011
15:00

| Scarlets (Wales) | 24 – 17 | (Ireland) Ulster (1 BP) |
| | Report |

Parc y Scarlets, Llanelli
Attendance: 7,075
Referee: Alan Falzone

29 October 2011
18:00

| (1 BP) Connacht (Ireland) | 20 – 26 | (Wales) Cardiff Blues |
| | Report |

Galway Sportsgrounds, Galway
Attendance: 3,996
Referee: Neil Paterson

=== Round 8 ===
4 November 2011
19:05

| Newport Gwent Dragons (Wales) | P – P | (Wales) Cardiff Blues |
| | Report |

Rodney Parade, Newport

4 November 2011
20:00

| Leinster (Ireland) | 24 – 19 | (Ireland) Munster (1 BP) |
| | Report |

Aviva Stadium, Dublin
Attendance: 48,365
Referee: Pascal Gauzere

5 November 2011
14:30

| Aironi (Italy) | 6 – 18 | (Scotland) Glasgow Warriors |
| | Report |

Stadio Luigi Zaffanella, Viadana
Attendance: 2,200
Referee: Dudley Phillips

5 November 2011
15:00

| Benetton Treviso (Italy) | 11 – 22 | (Scotland) Edinburgh |
| | Report |

Stadio Comunale di Monigo, Treviso
Attendance: 3,500
Referee: Andrew Macpherson

5 November 2011
17:35

| Ulster (Ireland) | 22 – 3 | (Ireland) Connacht |
| | Report |

Ravenhill, Belfast
Attendance: 6,887
Referee: John Lacey

5 November 2011
18:30

| Ospreys (Wales) | 9 – 9 | (Wales) Scarlets |
| | Report |

Liberty Stadium, Swansea
Attendance: 12,332
Referee: Mathieu Raynal

=== Round 9 ===
24 November 2011
19:30

| (1 BP) Cardiff Blues (Wales) | 38 – 0 | (Italy) Aironi |
| | Report |

Cardiff City Stadium, Cardiff
Attendance: 4,557
Referee: Leo Colgan

25 November 2011
19:05

| Scarlets (Wales) | 22 – 12 | (Wales) Newport Gwent Dragons |
| | Report |

Parc y Scarlets, Llanelli
Attendance: 7,950
Referee: Leighton Hodges

25 November 2011
19:35

| Glasgow Warriors (Scotland) | 17 – 9 | (Ireland) Ulster |
| | Report |

Firhill Stadium, Glasgow
Attendance: 3,940
Referee: Stefano Penne

26 November 2011
15:00

| Benetton Treviso (Italy) | 20 – 30 | (Ireland) Leinster |
| | Report |

Stadio Comunale di Monigo, Treviso
Attendance: 4,600
Referee: George Clancy

26 November 2011
18:30

| Connacht (Ireland) | 6 – 17 | (Wales) Ospreys |
| | Report |

Galway Sportsgrounds, Galway
Attendance: 4,107
Referee: Andrew McMenemy

26 November 2011
20:30

| (1 BP) Munster (Ireland) | 34 – 17 | (Scotland) Edinburgh |
| | Report |

Thomond Park, Limerick
Attendance: 18,200
Referee: Neil Paterson

=== Round 10 ===
2 December 2011
19:05

| Ulster (Ireland) | 24 – 17 | (Wales) Scarlets (1 BP) |
| | Report |

Ravenhill, Belfast
Attendance: 8,117
Referee: Alain Rolland

2 December 2011
19:30

| (1 BP) Connacht (Ireland) | 13 – 15 | (Italy) Benetton Treviso |
| | Report |

Galway Sportsgrounds, Galway
Attendance: 3,614
Referee: Neil Hennessy

2 December 2011
19:30

| (1 BP) Edinburgh (Scotland) | 50 – 10 | (Italy) Aironi |
| | Report |

Murrayfield Stadium, Edinburgh
Attendance: 4,403
Referee: John Lacey

2 December 2011
20:05

| (1 BP) Leinster (Ireland) | 52 – 9 | (Wales) Cardiff Blues |
| | Report |

RDS Arena, Dublin
Attendance: 16,347
Referee: Andrew Macpherson

3 December 2011
18:30

| Ospreys (Wales) | 19 – 13 | (Ireland) Munster (1 BP) |
| | Report |

Liberty Stadium, Swansea
Attendance: 5,783
Referee: Peter Allan

4 December 2011
16:30

| Newport Gwent Dragons (Wales) | 14 – 14 | (Scotland) Glasgow Warriors |
| | Report |

Rodney Parade, Newport
Attendance: 5,273
Referee: David Wilkinson

=== Round 11 ===
23 December 2011
19:00

| Aironi (Italy) | 27 – 13 | (Italy) Benetton Treviso |
| | Report |

Stadio Luigi Zaffanella, Viadana
Attendance: 3,326
Referee: Carlo Damasco

23 December 2011
19:35

| Cardiff Blues (Wales) | 28 – 9 | (Wales) Newport Gwent Dragons |
| | Report |

Cardiff City Stadium, Cardiff
Attendance: 10,660
Referee: Leighton Hodges

26 December 2011
14:05

| Scarlets (Wales) | 22 – 14 | (Wales) Ospreys |
| | Report |

Parc y Scarlets, Llanelli
Attendance: 14,756
Referee: Nigel Owens

26 December 2011
17:30

| (1 BP) Leinster (Ireland) | 42 – 13 | (Ireland) Ulster |
| | Report |

RDS Arena, Dublin
Attendance: 18,500
Referee: Peter Fitzgibbon

26 December 2011
19:45

| Munster (Ireland) | 24 – 9 | (Ireland) Connacht |
| | Report |

Thomond Park, Limerick
Attendance: 21,030
Referee: Dudley Phillips

==== 1872 Cup 1st round ====
26 December 2011
17:35

| Edinburgh (Scotland) | 23 – 23 | (Scotland) Glasgow Warriors |
| | Report |

Murrayfield Stadium, Edinburgh
Attendance: 13,246
Referee: Neil Paterson

=== Round 12 ===
30 December 2011
19:05

| (1 BP) Newport Gwent Dragons (Wales) | 6 – 10 | (Wales) Scarlets |
| | Report |

Rodney Parade, Newport
Attendance: 7,571
Referee: Neil Hennessy

30 December 2011
19:05

| (1 BP) Ulster (Ireland) | 33 – 17 | (Ireland) Munster |
| | Report |

Ravenhill, Belfast
Attendance: 11,379
Referee: Alain Rolland

31 December 2011
15:00

| (1 BP) Benetton Treviso (Italy) | 37 – 14 | (Italy) Aironi |
| | Report |

Stadio Comunale di Monigo, Treviso
Attendance: 4,200
Referee: Stefano Penne

1 January 2012
17:00

| (1 BP) Connacht (Ireland) | 13 – 15 | (Ireland) Leinster |
| | Report |

Galway Sportsgrounds, Galway
Attendance: 6,582
Referee: John Lacey

1 January 2012
18:30

| Ospreys (Wales) | 17 – 12 | (Wales) Cardiff Blues (1 BP) |
| | Report |

Liberty Stadium, Swansea
Attendance: 11,186
Referee: Nigel Owens

==== 1872 Cup 2nd round ====
1 January 2012
17:35

| Glasgow Warriors (Scotland) | 17 – 12 | (Scotland) Edinburgh (1 BP) |
| | Report |

Firhill Stadium, Glasgow
Attendance: 8,852
Referee: Peter Allan

=== Round 13 ===
6 January 2012
19:05

| Newport Gwent Dragons (Wales) | 21 – 20 | (Wales) Ospreys (1 BP) |
| | Report |

Rodney Parade, Newport
Attendance: 6,897
Referee: James Jones

6 January 2012
19:30

| Edinburgh (Scotland) | 20 – 42 | (Ireland) Ulster (1 BP) |
| | Report |

Murrayfield Stadium, Edinburgh
Attendance: 3,792
Referee: George Clancy

7 January 2012
16:35

| Aironi (Italy) | 20 – 6 | (Ireland) Connacht |
| | Report |

Stadio Luigi Zaffanella, Viadana
Attendance: 2,500
Referee: Andrew McMenemy

7 January 2012
18:15

| (1 BP) Cardiff Blues (Wales) | 19 – 23 | (Ireland) Leinster |
| | Report |

Cardiff City Stadium, Cardiff
Attendance: 9,390
Referee: Marius Mitrea

7 January 2012
18:15

| Scarlets (Wales) | 16 – 14 | (Scotland) Glasgow Warriors (1 BP) |
| | Report |

Parc y Scarlets, Llanelli
Attendance: 9,869
Referee: Dudley Phillips

7 January 2012
20:15

| (1 BP) Munster (Ireland) | 29 – 11 | (Italy) Benetton Treviso |
| | Report |

Thomond Park, Limerick
Attendance: 16,816
Referee: Nigel Owens

=== Round 14 ===
9 February 2012
19:05

| Glasgow Warriors (Scotland) | 19 – 9 | (Wales) Scarlets |
| | Report |

Firhill Stadium, Glasgow
Attendance: 2,665
Referee: Nigel Owens

9 February 2012
19:05

| (1 BP) Leinster (Ireland) | 42 – 8 | (Italy) Benetton Treviso |
| | Report |

RDS Arena, Dublin
Attendance: 15,648
Referee: Leighton Hodges

10 February 2012
19:05

| (1 BP) Ulster (Ireland) | 30 – 12 | (Wales) Newport Gwent Dragons |
| | Report |

Ravenhill, Belfast
Attendance: 7,435
Referee: Carlo Damasco

10 February 2012
19:30

| Cardiff Blues (Wales) | 22 – 15 | (Ireland) Connacht (1 BP) |
| | Report |

Cardiff Arms Park, Cardiff
Attendance: 8,000
Referee: Andrew McMenemy

10 February 2012
19:35

| (1 BP) Edinburgh (Scotland) | 14 – 15 | (Wales) Ospreys |
| | Report |

Murrayfield Stadium, Edinburgh
Attendance: 3,209
Referee: Leo Colgan

12 February 2012
15:00

| Aironi (Italy) | P – P | (Ireland) Munster |
| | Report |

Stadio Luigi Zaffanella, Viadana

=== Round 15 ===
17 February 2012
19:05

| Cardiff Blues (Wales) | 21 – 14 | (Ireland) Ulster (1 BP) |
| | Report |

Cardiff Arms Park, Cardiff
Attendance: 9,154
Referee: George Clancy

17 February 2012
19:30

| Ospreys (Wales) | 23 – 7 | (Italy) Aironi |
| | Report |

Liberty Stadium, Swansea
Attendance: 5,554
Referee: Marius Mitrea

17 February 2012
19:35

| Leinster (Ireland) | 16 – 13 | (Wales) Scarlets (1 BP) |
| | Report |

RDS Arena, Dublin
Attendance: 16,683
Referee: Nigel Owens

18 February 2012
16:15

| Benetton Treviso (Italy) | 14 – 35 | (Ireland) Munster (1 BP) |
| | Report |

Stadio Comunale di Monigo, Treviso
Attendance: 4,200
Referee: Neil Hennessy

18 February 2012
17:30

| Connacht (Ireland) | 13 – 13 | (Scotland) Glasgow Warriors |
| | Report |

Galway Sportsgrounds, Galway
Attendance: 4,189
Referee: Peter Allan

18 February 2012
18:30

| Newport Gwent Dragons (Wales) | 21 – 10 | (Scotland) Edinburgh |
| | Report |

Rodney Parade, Newport
Attendance: 5,130
Referee: Alan Falzone

=== Round 16 ===
23 February 2012
19:35

| (1 BP) Scarlets (Wales) | 34 – 20 | (Italy) Benetton Treviso |
| | Report |

Parc y Scarlets, Llanelli
Attendance: 6,594
Referee: Stefano Penne

24 February 2012
19:05

| Munster (Ireland) | 16 – 13 | (Wales) Cardiff Blues (1 BP) |
| | Report |

Thomond Park, Limerick
Attendance: 16,000
Referee: Leighton Hodges

24 February 2012
19:05

| Ulster (Ireland) | 15 – 14 | (Wales) Ospreys (1 BP) |
| | Report |

Ravenhill, Belfast
Attendance: 8,131
Referee: Neil Hennessy

24 February 2012
19:30

| Connacht (Ireland) | 26 – 13 | (Scotland) Edinburgh |
| | Report |

Galway Sportsgrounds, Galway
Attendance: 4,324
Referee: Carlo Damasco

25 February 2012
18:00

| Glasgow Warriors (Scotland) | 10 – 10 | (Ireland) Leinster |
| | Report |

Firhill Stadium, Glasgow
Attendance: 3,115
Referee: John Lacey

26 February 2012
16:30

| (1 BP) Aironi (Italy) | 9 – 10 | (Wales) Newport Gwent Dragons |
| | Report |

Stadio Luigi Zaffanella, Viadana
Attendance: 2,712
Referee: Leo Colgan

=== Round 17 ===
2 March 2012
19:00

| Aironi (Italy) | 6 – 22 | (Ireland) Leinster |
| | Report |

Stadio Luigi Zaffanella, Viadana
Attendance: 2,100
Referee: Andrew Macpherson

2 March 2012
19:05

| (1 BP) Ospreys (Wales) | 20 – 26 | (Scotland) Glasgow Warriors |
| | Report |

Liberty Stadium, Swansea
Attendance: 5,782
Referee: Neil Paterson

2 March 2012
19:05

| (1 BP) Ulster (Ireland) | 38 – 16 | (Scotland) Edinburgh |
| | Report |

Ravenhill, Belfast
Attendance: 8,044
Referee: Nigel Owens

2 March 2012
19:30

| (1 BP) Scarlets (Wales) | 38 – 10 | (Ireland) Connacht |
| | Report |

Parc y Scarlets, Llanelli
Attendance: 7,534
Referee: Marius Mitrea

3 March 2012
16:30

| (1 BP) Benetton Treviso (Italy) | 13 – 20 | (Wales) Cardiff Blues |
| | Report |

Stadio Comunale di Monigo, Treviso
Attendance: 3,000
Referee: David Wilkinson

3 March 2012
18:30

| Newport Gwent Dragons (Wales) | 14 – 24 | (Ireland) Munster |
| | Report |

Rodney Parade, Newport
Attendance: 6,012
Referee: Carlo Damasco

=== Rearranged fixtures ===
11 March 2012
15:00

| Aironi (Italy) | 21 – 17 | (Ireland) Munster (1 BP) |
| | Report |

Stadio Luigi Zaffanella, Viadana
Attendance: 3,000
Referee: David Wilkinson

15 March 2012
19:05

| Newport Gwent Dragons (Wales) | 18 – 14 | (Wales) Cardiff Blues (1 BP) |
| | Report |

Rodney Parade, Newport
Attendance: 7,821
Referee: Leighton Hodges

=== Round 18 ===
23 March 2012
19:05

| (1 BP) Leinster (Ireland) | 22 – 23 | (Wales) Ospreys |
| | Report |

RDS Arena, Dublin
Attendance: 18,300
Referee: Peter Fitzgibbon

23 March 2012
19:30

| Edinburgh (Scotland) | 15 – 29 | (Wales) Newport Gwent Dragons |
| | Report |

Murrayfield Stadium, Edinburgh
Attendance: 4,459
Referee: John Lacey

23 March 2012
19:35

| Glasgow Warriors (Scotland) | 29 – 6 | (Italy) Aironi |
| | Report |

Firhill Stadium, Glasgow
Attendance: 4,110
Referee: Dudley Phillips

24 March 2012
16:15

| (1 BP) Benetton Treviso (Italy) | 23 – 27 | (Ireland) Ulster |
| | Report |

Stadio Comunale di Monigo, Treviso
Attendance: 4,200
Referee: Leighton Hodges

24 March 2012
18:30

| Cardiff Blues (Wales) | 14 – 26 | (Wales) Scarlets (1 BP) |
| | Report |

Cardiff City Stadium, Cardiff
Attendance: 8,337
Referee: Nigel Owens

24 March 2012
19:45

| (1 BP) Connacht (Ireland) | 16 – 20 | (Ireland) Munster |
| | Report |

Galway Sportsgrounds, Galway
Attendance: 7,022
Referee: Neil Paterson

=== Round 19 ===
30 March 2012
19:05

| (1 BP) Ulster (Ireland) | 45 – 7 | (Italy) Aironi |
| | Report |

Ravenhill, Belfast
Attendance: 10,125
Referee: Neil Paterson

30 March 2012
19:15

| Newport Gwent Dragons (Wales) | 19 – 27 | (Ireland) Connacht |
| | Report |

Rodney Parade, Newport
Attendance: 6,297
Referee: Giuseppe Vivarini

30 March 2012
19:30

| (1 BP) Glasgow Warriors (Scotland) | 31 – 3 | (Wales) Cardiff Blues |
| | Report |

Firhill Stadium, Glasgow
Attendance: 4,224
Referee: George Clancy

30 March 2012
19:35

| Edinburgh (Scotland) | 26 – 23 | (Wales) Scarlets (1 BP) |
| | Report |

Murrayfield Stadium, Edinburgh
Attendance: 2,969
Referee: Peter Fitzgibbon

31 March 2012
18:30

| (1 BP) Ospreys (Wales) | 41 – 10 | (Italy) Benetton Treviso |
| | Report |

Liberty Stadium, Swansea
Attendance: 7,514
Referee: Alain Rolland

31 March 2012
19:30

| Munster (Ireland) | 9 – 18 | (Ireland) Leinster |
| | Report |

Thomond Park, Limerick
Attendance: 26,500
Referee: Nigel Owens

=== Round 20 ===
13 April 2012
19:30

| (2 BP) Newport Gwent Dragons (Wales) | 32 – 33 | (Italy) Benetton Treviso (1 BP) |
| | Report |

Rodney Parade, Newport
Attendance: 5,168
Referee: James Matthews

13 April 2012
19:45

| (1 BP) Leinster (Ireland) | 54 – 13 | (Scotland) Edinburgh |
| | Report |

RDS Arena, Dublin
Attendance: 16,224
Referee: Peter Fitzgibbon

14 April 2012
17:15

| Connacht (Ireland) | 26 – 21 | (Ireland) Ulster (1 BP) |
| | Report |

Galway Sportsgrounds, Galway
Attendance: 5,017
Referee: Dudley Phillips

14 April 2012
18:30

| Cardiff Blues (Wales) | 12 – 33 | (Wales) Ospreys |
| | Report |

Cardiff City Stadium, Cardiff
Attendance: 8,396
Referee: George Clancy

14 April 2012
19:15

| Munster (Ireland) | 35 – 29 | (Scotland) Glasgow Warriors (1 BP) |
| | Report |

Musgrave Park, Cork
Attendance: 8,742
Referee: Nigel Owens

15 April 2012
15:05

| (1 BP) Aironi (Italy) | 23 – 26 | (Wales) Scarlets |
| | Report |

Stadio Luigi Zaffanella, Viadana
Attendance: 3,300
Referee: John Lacey

=== Round 21 ===
20 April 2012
19:05

| (1 BP) Ospreys (Wales) | 31 – 12 | (Wales) Newport Gwent Dragons |
| | Report |

Liberty Stadium, Swansea
Attendance: 14,478
Referee: Nigel Owens

20 April 2012
19:05

| Ulster (Ireland) | 8 – 16 | (Ireland) Leinster |
| | Report |

Ravenhill, Belfast
Attendance: 10,500
Referee: John Lacey

21 April 2012
17:00

| Connacht (Ireland) | 19 – 16 | (Italy) Aironi (1 BP) |
| | Report |

Galway Sportsgrounds, Galway
Attendance: 5,216
Referee: Ian Davies

21 April 2012
18:30

| Scarlets (Wales) | 20 – 20 | (Ireland) Munster |
| | Report |

Parc y Scarlets, Llanelli
Attendance: 10,741
Referee: Alain Rolland

22 April 2012
14:05

| (1 BP) Cardiff Blues (Wales) | 38 – 13 | (Scotland) Edinburgh |
| | Report |

Cardiff City Stadium, Cardiff
Attendance: 3,580
Referee: Dudley Phillips

22 April 2012
15:05

| (1 BP) Benetton Treviso (Italy) | 8 – 13 | (Scotland) Glasgow Warriors |
| | Report |

Stadio Comunale di Monigo, Treviso
Attendance: 4,200
Referee: Leighton Hodges

=== Round 22 ===
5 May 2012
19:30

| (1 BP) Edinburgh (Scotland) | 44 – 21 | (Italy) Benetton Treviso |
| | Report |

Murrayfield Stadium, Edinburgh
Attendance: 2,855
Referee: Mark Patton

5 May 2012
19:30

| Glasgow Warriors (Scotland) | 24 – 3 | (Ireland) Connacht |
| | Report |

Firhill Stadium, Glasgow
Attendance: 5,374
Referee: Peter Fitzgibbon

5 May 2012
19:30

| (1 BP) Munster (Ireland) | 36 – 8 | (Ireland) Ulster |
| | Report |

Thomond Park, Limerick
Attendance: 19,362
Referee: Alain Rolland

5 May 2012
19:30

| (1 BP) Newport Gwent Dragons (Wales) | 18 – 22 | (Ireland) Leinster |
| | Report |

Rodney Parade, Newport
Attendance: 8,038
Referee: Marius Mitrea

5 May 2012
19:30

| (1 BP) Scarlets (Wales) | 29 – 20 | (Wales) Cardiff Blues |
| | Report |

Parc y Scarlets, Llanelli
Attendance: 13,047
Referee: Nigel Owens

5 May 2012
20:30

| (1 BP) Aironi (Italy) | 11 – 18 | (Wales) Ospreys |
| | Report |

Stadio Luigi Zaffanella, Viadana
Attendance: 4,000
Referee: Neil Paterson

== Playoffs ==
=== Semi-finals ===
11 May 2012
19:35

| Ospreys (Wales) | 45 – 10 | (Ireland) Munster |
| Try: Biggar 12' c Fotuali'i 40' c Dirksen 55' m Bishop 63' c Webb 71' c Con: Biggar (4/5); Pen: Biggar (4/4) 8', 22', 30', 49' | Report | Try: Keatley 3' c Con: Keatley (1/1); Pen: Keatley (1/1) 20' |

Liberty Stadium, Swansea
Attendance: 10,026
Referee: Alain Rolland

12 May 2012
19:35

| Leinster (Ireland) | 19 – 15 | (Scotland) Glasgow Warriors |
| Try: D. Kearney 66' c Con: Sexton (1/1); Pen: Sexton (4/4) 7', 23', 38', 63' | Report | Try: Hall 77' m Hogg 80' c Con: Jackson (1/2); Pen: Weir (1/3) 9' |

RDS Arena, Dublin
Attendance: 15,113
Referee: George Clancy

=== Final ===
27 May 2012
16:00

| Leinster (Ireland) | 30–31 | (Wales) Ospreys |
| Try: Cronin 26' c Nacewa (2) 35' c, 61' c Con: Sexton (3/3); Pen: Sexton (3/4) 11', 44', 51' | Report | Try: Beck 42' c Williams (2) 59' m, 78' c Con: Biggar (2/3); Pen: Biggar (4/4) 8', 22', 34', 73' |

RDS Arena, Dublin
Attendance: 18,500
Referee: Romain Poite

| FB | 15 | (Ireland) Rob Kearney |
| RW | 14 | (Ireland) Fergus McFadden |
| OC | 13 | (Ireland) Brian O'Driscoll |
| IC | 12 | (Ireland) Gordon D'Arcy |
| LW | 11 | (Fiji) Isa Nacewa |
| FH | 10 | (Ireland) Johnny Sexton |
| SH | 9 | (Ireland) Eoin Reddan |
| N8 | 8 | (Ireland) Jamie Heaslip |
| OF | 7 | (Ireland) Shane Jennings |
| BF | 6 | (Ireland) Kevin McLaughlin |
| RL | 5 | (Ireland) Devin Toner |
| LL | 4 | (Ireland) Leo Cullen (c) |
| TP | 3 | (Ireland) Mike Ross |
| HK | 2 | (Ireland) Seán Cronin |
| LP | 1 | (South Africa) Heinke van der Merwe |
Replacements:
| HK | 16 | (South Africa) Richardt Strauss |
| PR | 17 | (Ireland) Jack McGrath |
| PR | 19 | (New Zealand) Nathan White |
| LK | 21 | (New Zealand) Brad Thorn |
| FL | 20 | (Ireland) Dominic Ryan |
| SH | 18 | (Ireland) John Cooney |
| FH | 22 | (Ireland) Ian Madigan |
| WG | 23 | (Ireland) Dave Kearney |
Coach:
(New Zealand) Joe Schmidt

| FB | 15 | (Wales) Richard Fussell |
| RW | 14 | (South Africa) Hanno Dirksen |
| OC | 13 | (Wales) Andrew Bishop |
| IC | 12 | (Wales) Ashley Beck |
| LW | 11 | (Wales) Shane Williams |
| FH | 10 | (Wales) Dan Biggar |
| SH | 9 | (Wales) Rhys Webb |
| N8 | 8 | (Wales) Joe Bearman |
| OF | 7 | (Wales) Justin Tipuric |
| BF | 6 | (Wales) Ryan Jones |
| RL | 5 | (Wales) Ian Evans |
| LL | 4 | (Wales) Alun Wyn Jones (c) |
| TP | 3 | (Wales) Adam Rhys Jones |
| HK | 2 | (Wales) Richard Hibbard |
| LP | 1 | (Wales) Paul James |
Replacements:
| HK | 16 | (Wales) Scott Baldwin |
| PR | 17 | (Wales) Ryan Bevington |
| PR | 18 | (Wales) Aaron Jarvis |
| FL | 19 | (Wales) James King |
| FL | 20 | (Wales) Tom Smith |
| SH | 21 | (Samoa) Kahn Fotuali'i |
| FB | 22 | (Wales) Matthew Morgan |
| CE | 23 | (Wales) Tom Isaacs |
Coach:
Sean Holley

== Leading scorers ==
Note: Flags to the left of player names indicate national team as has been defined under IRB eligibility rules, or primary nationality for players who have not yet earned international senior caps. Players may hold one or more non-IRB nationalities.

=== Top points scorers ===
| Rank | Player | Club | Points |
|---|---|---|---|
| 1 | (Wales) Dan Biggar | (Wales) Ospreys | 257 |
| 2 | (Scotland) Duncan Weir | (Scotland) Glasgow Warriors | 198 |
| 3 | (Ireland) Ian Keatley | (Ireland) Munster | 187 |
| 4 | (Scotland) Greig Laidlaw | (Scotland) Edinburgh | 171 |
| 5 | (Italy) Kris Burton | (Italy) Benetton Treviso | 154 |

=== Top try scorers ===
| Rank | Player | Club | Tries |
|---|---|---|---|
| 1 | (Netherlands) Tim Visser (Note: Tim Visser did not qualify for Scotland until June 2012.) | (Scotland) Edinburgh | 13 |
| 2 | (Wales) Alex Cuthbert | (Wales) Cardiff Blues | 10 |
| 3 | (Ireland) Simon Zebo | (Ireland) Munster | 8 |
| 4 | (Ireland) Ian Madigan | (Ireland) Leinster | 7 |
| 5 | (South Africa) Hanno Dirksen (Note: Hanno Dirksen will qualify for Wales in 2014.) | (Wales) Ospreys | 6 |

2011/2012 Dream Team

| Pos | | Player | Team |
|---|---|---|---|
| FB | 15 | (Fiji) Isa Nacewa | Leinster |
| RW | 14 | (Scotland) Tim Visser | Edinburgh |
| OC | 13 | (New Zealand) Casey Laulala | Blues |
| IC | 12 | (Wales) Ashley Beck | Ospreys |
| LW | 11 | (Wales) Alex Cuthbert | Blues |
| FH | 10 | (Scotland) Duncan Weir | Glasgow |
| SH | 9 | (South Africa) Ruan Pienaar | Ulster |
| N8 | 8 | (England) Ben Morgan | Scarlets |
| OF | 7 | (Wales) Justin Tipuric | Ospreys |
| BF | 6 | (Scotland) David Denton | Edinburgh |
| RL | 5 | (Scotland) Tom Ryder | Glasgow |
| LL | 4 | (Republic of Ireland) Dan Tuohy | Ulster |
| TP | 3 | (South Africa) BJ Botha | Ulster |
| HK | 2 | (Republic of Ireland) Richardt Strauss | Leinster |
| LP | 1 | (Scotland) Jon Welsh | Glasgow |

== Broadcasting rights ==
Setanta Sports Australia broadcasts live RaboDirect Pro12 matches in Australia. Setanta Sports Asia broadcast live RaboDirect Pro12 matches in Asia also.
