= Struan =

Struan is a name of Scottish origin and may refer to:

== Places ==
- Struan, South Australia, Australia
- Struan, Saskatchewan, Canada
- Struan, Skye, Scotland
- Struan, Perthshire, Scotland
  - Struan railway station

== People ==
- Struan Dewar (born 1989), Scottish rugby player
- Struan Murray, Scottish scientist and author; winner of the 2021 Branford Boase Award
- Struan Rodger (born 1946), British actor
- Struan Stevenson (born 1948), Scottish politician
- Struan Sutherland (1936–2002), Australian medical researcher
- Struan Walker (born 2002), Scottish field hockey player

== Other uses ==
- Struan, a shipwreck of Oregon
- Struan's, a trading company in the Asian Saga novels by James Clavell
  - Dirk Struan, the founder of Struan's
- Struan Michael, a variety of flat quick bread served on Michaelmas

== See also ==
- Clan Robertson
- Clan Duncan
- List of listed buildings in Bracadale, Highland
