= 2010 IRB Nations Cup =

Tournament details
- Countries: Argentina XV; Georgia; Italy A Namibia; Romania; Scotland A
- Tournament format(s): Modified Round-robin
- Date: 11 – 20 June 2010

Tournament statistics
- Teams: 6
- Matches played: 9
- Attendance: 0 (0 per match)
- Tries scored: 25 (2.78 per match)
- Top point scorer(s): Luciano Orquera (Italy A) (55 points)
- Top try scorer(s): Cătălin Fercu (Romania); Bryan Rennie (Scotland A); Joaquín Tuculet (Argentina Jaguars) (2 tries)

Final
- Champions: Namibia (1st title)
- Runners-up: Romania

The 2010 IRB Nations Cup was the fifth edition of the international rugby union tournament, a competition created by the International Rugby Board. It pits the "A" Teams of the stronger (Tier 1) rugby nations (Argentina Jaguars, Italy A and Scotland A) against some of the Tier 2 and 3 nations (Romania, Namibia and Georgia).

For the fourth consecutive year the event was held in Bucharest, Romania. Scotland A returned to defend their title, but Namibia were the overall winners of the tournament.

The competition format was a modified round-robin whereby each team played 3 of the other 5 teams. The competition was played over three match days, with three matches played consecutively on each day.

== Final standings ==
2010 IRB Nations Cup
	Team	Played	Won	Drawn	Lost	Points For	Points Against	Points Difference	Tries For	Tries Against	Try Bonus	Losing Bonus	Points
1	Namibia	3	3	0	0	65	53	+12	7	5	0	0	12
2	Romania	3	2	0	1	68	51	+17	4	4	0	1	9
3	Italy A	3	2	0	1	65	50	+15	2	4	0	1	9
4	Argentina XV	3	1	0	2	61	59	+2	5	2	0	1	5
5	Georgia	3	1	0	2	41	63	-22	2	4	0	1	5
6	Scotland A	3	0	0	3	54	78	-24	5	6	0	2	2
Source : irb.com Points breakdown: *4 points for a win *2 points for a draw *1 bonus point for a loss by seven points or less *1 bonus point for scoring four or more tries in a match

== Fixtures ==
=== Round 1 ===
IRB Reports

11 June 2010
15:00 EET (UTC+02)

Namibia	21 – 17	Romania
Try: de la Harpe 44' c Winckler 80' m Con: Botha (1/2); Pen: Bock (0/2); Botha (3/4) 38', 58', 63'	Stats	Try: Fercu 16' c Maris 78' c Con: Dumbravă (2/2); Pen: Dumbravă (1/2) 56'; Drop: Dumbravă (0/1)

Referee: (United States) Aruna Ranaweera

11 June 2010
17:00 EET (UTC+02)

Argentina XV	20 – 22	Italy A
Try: Agulla 10' c Imhoff 35' c Con: Iglesias (2/2); Pen: Iglesias (2/2) 42', 58'; Sanchez (0/1); Drop: Tuculet (0/1); Rosati (0/1)	Stats	Try: Barbieri 80' c Con: Orquera (1/1); Pen: Orquera (5/6) 5', 16', 30', 50', 70'

Stadionul Arcul de Triumf, Bucharest
Referee: (Canada) Bryan Arciero

11 June 2010
19:00 EET (UTC+02)

Scotland A	21 – 22	Georgia
Try: Robertson 3' c Fusaro 77' m Con: Laidlaw (1/1); Blair (0/1); Pen: Laidlaw (2/2) 16', 21'; Blair (1/1) 64'; Drop: Blair (0/1)	Stats	Try: Sutiashvili 42' c Con: Kiasashvili (1/1); Pen: Kiasashvili (5/5) 39', 42', 49', 61', 70'; Drop: Kiasashvili (0/1)

Stadionul Arcul de Triumf, Bucharest
Referee: (South Africa) Marius Jonker

=== Round 2 ===
IRB Reports

15 June 2010
15:00 EET (UTC+02)

Italy A	21 – 3	Georgia
Pen: Orquera (7/8) 7', 10', 34', 38', 47', 49', 59'	Stats	Pen: Kvirikashvili (1/3) 53'; Drop: Kvirikashvili (0/1); Urjukashvili (0/1)

Stadionul Arcul de Triumf, Bucharest
Referee: (South Africa) Marius Jonker

15 June 2010
17:00 EET (UTC+02)

Scotland A	20 – 23	Namibia
Try: Rennie 14' c Laidlaw 73' c Con: Blair (1/1); Laidlaw (1/1); Pen: Blair (2/3) 6', 26'	Stats	Try: Jantjies 25' m Esterhuizen 49' c du Plessis 58' m Con: Botha (1/3) 22', 43'; Pen: Botha (2/2) 22', 43'

Stadionul Arcul de Triumf, Bucharest
Referee: (Canada) Bryan Arciero

15 June 2010
19:00 EET (UTC+02)

Romania	24 – 8	Argentina XV
Pen: Dumbravă (5/6) 12', 16', 28', 33', 37'; Vlaicu (2/3) 44', 69'; Drop: Dumbravă (0/1)	Stats	Try: Cuneo 10' m Con: Rosati (0/1); Pen: Rosati (1/2) 21'

Stadionul Arcul de Triumf, Bucharest
Referee: (Scotland) Neil Paterson

=== Round 3 ===
IRB Reports

20 June 2010
15:00 EET (UTC+02)

Georgia	16 – 21	Namibia
Try: Kolelishvili 23' c Con: Urjukashvili (1/1); Pen: Urjukashvili (3/3) 5', 14', 63'	Stats	Try: Koll 56' m Botha 73' c Con: Botha (0/1); Jantjies (1/1); Pen: Botha (3/4) 43', 45', 70'; Jantjies (0/1); Drop: Walters (0/1)

Stadionul Arcul de Triumf, Bucharest
Referee: (Scotland) Neil Paterson

20 June 2010
17:00 EET (UTC+02)

Argentina XV	33 – 13	Scotland A
Try: Tuculet (2) 20' m, 52' c Con: Iglesias (1/2); Pen: Iglesias (5/7) 2', 30', 35', 50', 73'; Sanchez (2/2) 78', 80'; Drop: Iglesias (0/1)	Stats	Try: Rennie 9' c Con: Laidlaw (1/1); Pen: Laidlaw (2/3) 37', 63'

Stadionul Arcul de Triumf, Bucharest
Referee: (United States) Aruna Ranaweera

20 June 2010
19:00 EET (UTC+02)

Italy A	22 – 27	Romania
Try: Sgarbi 18' c Con: Orquera (1/1); Pen: Orquera (5/6) 1', 12', 39', 63', 77'	Stats	Try: Popescu 2' m Fercu 73' c Con: Dumbravă (1/2); Pen: Dumbravă (5/6) 9', 30', 40', 42', 71'; Vlaicu (0/1); Drop: Dumbravă (0/1)

Stadionul Arcul de Triumf, Bucharest
Referee: (South Africa) Marius Jonker

== Top scorers ==
=== Top points scorers ===
Rank	Player	Team	Points
1	Luciano Orquera	Italy A	55
2	Dănuț Dumbravă	Romania	42
3	Chrysander Botha	Namibia	33
4	Santiago Gonzalez Iglesias	Argentina XV	27
5	Greig Laidlaw	Scotland A	23
6	Irakli Kiasashvili	Georgia	17
7	David Blair	Scotland A	11
7	Malkhaz Urjukashvili	Georgia	11
9	Cătălin Fercu	Romania	10
9	Bryan Rennie	Scotland A	10
9	Joaquín Tuculet	Argentina XV	10

Source: irb.com

=== Top try scorers ===
Rank	Player	Team	Tries
1	Cătălin Fercu	Romania	2
1	Bryan Rennie	Scotland A	2
1	Joaquín Tuculet	Argentina XV	2
4	19 players		1

Source: irb.com

== See also ==
- 2010 IRB Pacific Nations Cup
