= Craig Hamilton =

Scotland international rugby union player

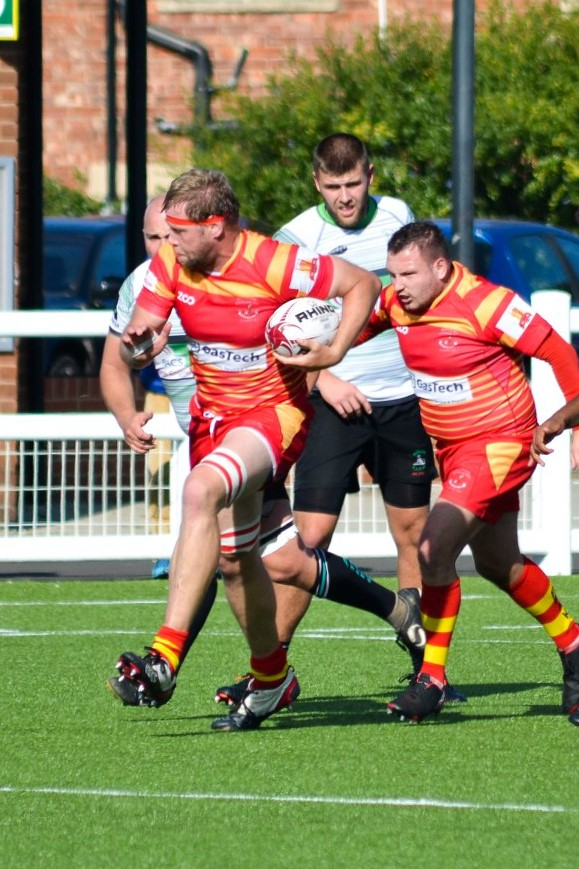
- Full name: Craig Peter Hamilton
- Born: 1 September 1974 (age 52) Dumfries, Scotland
- Height: 204 cm (6 ft 8 in)
- Weight: 98 kg (216 lb; 15 st 6 lb)
- Occupation: Rugby player

Rugby union career
- Position: Lock
- Current team: Whitley Bay Rockcliff RFC
Senior career
Years	Team	Apps	(Points)
1999–2005	Newcastle Falcons	50	
2005–2006	Glasgow Warriors		
2007–2009	Border Reivers		
2009–2011	Edinburgh Rugby	74	
2011–2012	Tarbes Pyrénées Rugby		
2012–2013	Valance d'Agen		
2014–2017	Falkirk		
2017–2018	Hawick RFC		
2018–Present	Whitley Bay Rockcliff		
- Correct as of 13 December 2019
International career
Years	Team	Apps	(Points)
2000	Scotland Under–21	3	
2002	Scottish Students		
2004	Scotland	5	(0)
2005–2010	Scotland A	10	
- Correct as of 13 December 2019

Craig Peter Hamilton (born 1 September 1974, Dumfries) is a Scottish international rugby union player. He is a lock and currently plays at Whitley Bay Rockcliff RFC, Northumbria University Men's 1st XV and previously for Glasgow Warriors, Border Reivers, Edinburgh Rugby and French Second Division club Tarbes Pyrénées Rugby. He also currently coaches at Whitley Bay Rockcliff RFC

== Career ==
=== Club ===
Hamilton was born in Dumfries and is a former pupil of Stranraer Academy. He is 6 feet 8 inches tall and weighs 15 stones 8 pounds. He was previously with West of Scotland before moving to Newcastle to study where he played for Newcastle Falcons playing 50 games for the club between 1999 and 2005. He was a replacement as they won the 2004 Anglo-Welsh Cup final.

He then moved to Glasgow Warriors in the summer of 2005

He stayed in Glasgow for one season before moving to Border Reivers. From there he moved to Edinburgh Rugby.

In May 2011 it was announced that Hamilton was leaving Edinburgh had agreed to join French Second Division club Tarbes Pyrénées Rugby. He left the club along with Scott Newlands and Mark Robertson.

In June 2018 Hamilton took up the position of Player/Coach with Durham/Northumberland Division 2 side Whitley Bay Rockcliff RFC, helping the team secure promotion into Durham/Northumberland Division 1 for the first time in over 15 years and also the league record of the most points scored in a season.

In December 2019 Hamilton received the first red card of his career, in a hard fought game between Whitley Bay Rockcliff and Newcastle Medicals RFC, where a total of nine cards were given including seven yellow cards and two red.

=== International ===
He represented Scotland U21 in the 2000 SANZAR tournament, starting against Tonga and coming on as a replacement against South Africa and Argentina. He also represented Scottish Students, in particular starting in their game against French Students at Inverleith in March 2002. He has made 17 appearances for Scotland A including appearances in February 2010.

He was awarded his first Scotland cap on 19 June 2004 in Sydney, coming on as a replacement in the second Test against Australia. He gained 4 further caps in the five months from June to November 2005 when he started against each of Romania, Argentina, Samoa and New Zealand. He was on Scotland’s 2008 tour to Argentina but did not figure in the match squad for either Test match.
