= Bryan Rennie (rugby union) =

South African rugby union player

- Born: 21 December 1984 (age 41) Durban, South Africa
- Height: 1.88 m (6 ft 2 in)
- Weight: 107 kg (16 st 12 lb)
- School: Westville Boys' High School

Rugby union career
- Position: Centre
- Current team: Hong Kong Scottish
Senior career
Years	Team	Apps	(Points)
2006–07	Border Reivers	13	(0)
2007–08	London Irish	1	(0)
2009–12	Exeter Chiefs	38	(20)
2012-14	Bristol	9	(25)
2014-15	Hong Kong Scottish	19	(0)
International career
Years	Team	Apps	(Points)
2010-12	Scotland A	3	(10)

Bryan Rennie (born 21 December 1984, in South Africa) is a former rugby union player best known for his stint with the Exeter Chiefs in the RFU Championship and Aviva Premiership. His position of choice was as a centre. He matriculated from Westville Boys' High School in 2002, playing alongside future Springbok Waylon Murray in the first XV backline.

Bryan spent 3 years with the Natal Sharks academy in South Africa but was overlooked for Sharks selection despite excellent form for his amateur club side Collegians. With an Aberdeen-born father, he took advantage of a British passport at age 20 to pursue a professional career in the UK in 2005 playing initially for Scottish club Watsonians where they won their first (and only) Scottish Cup (rugby union) in 2006. His performances with Watsonians secured a professional deal with the Border Reivers until they folded in 2007 and he joined London Irish. He would make just one competitive start for London Irish and signed for the Exeter Chiefs in 2009 to get more first team game time.

He would become an integral member of the Exeter Chiefs side in the Championship during their rise and push for promotion into the Aviva Premiership. They would be runners-up in 2009 before finally winning the Championship and promotion in 2010. He made himself available for the Scotland National Team, receiving a call-up to play for Scotland A in 2010.

In 2012, it was announced that he would be joining Bristol but after impressive performances in pre-season, cruciate ligament injuries would limit his first team opportunities.

He signed for Hong Kong Scottish in 2014 as a player and general manager, ending his playing career in 2015. He is now the Commercial Manager for Hong Kong Rugby & co-owner of RugbyTots Hong Kong.

At representative level he also ran out for Barbarians RFC and The Classic Lions.

== Honours ==
Watsonians - Scottish Cup - Winner - 2006

Exeter Chiefs - RFU English Championship - Winner - 2010; Runner-up - 2009

Bristol Rovers - RFU English Championship - Runner-up - 2014
