= Ross Samson =

Scottish rugby union player

- Born: 17 January 1988 (age 38) Edinburgh, Scotland
- Height: 1.78 m (5 ft 10 in)
- Weight: 83 kg (13 st 1 lb; 183 lb)

Rugby union career
- Position: Scrumhalf
- Current team: London Scottish
Senior career
| Years | Team | Apps | (Points) |
| – | Edinburgh Rugby | | |
| – | London Irish | | |
| – | London Scottish | | |

Ross Gordon Samson (born 17 January 1988 in Edinburgh, Scotland) is a Scottish rugby union player and a former player for Edinburgh Rugby & London Irish, he currently plays for London Scottish.

A former pupil of Stewart's Melville College, he studied history at Newcastle University. He competed with Mike Blair for the number nine jersey whilst at Edinburgh Rugby. He made his first start for Edinburgh against Glasgow at Murrayfield on 2 January 2010.

Samson signed for Edinburgh Rugby in the summer of 2009 from the north east of England where he represented Newcastle Falcons and Tynedale RFC. He has also represented Barbarians FC on 3 occasions, scoring 4 tries in total.

Samson left Irish at the end of the 2011–12 season and joined London Scottish, alongside fellow Edinburgh alumni Phil Godman and Jim Thompson ahead of the 2012–13 season.
