= Tom Smith (rugby union, born 1985) =

Welsh rugby union footballer

- Born: Thomas Mitchell Smith; 14 December 1985 (age 40) Bristol, England
- Height: 6 ft 2 in (1.88 m)
- Weight: 16 st 11 lb (107 kg)
- School: Dyffryn Comprehensive School
- University: Cardiff University

Rugby union career
- Position(s): Flanker, number eight
Senior career
Years	Team	Apps	(Points)
- Neath
2007–2015	Ospreys	91	(15)
- Correct as of 3 July 2012
International career
Years	Team	Apps	(Points)
	Wales U21	3	(0)

Thomas Mitchell Smith (born 14 December 1985) is a Welsh rugby union player. A flanker, he currently plays for Welsh regional team Ospreys having previously played for Neath RFC and the Ospreys academy.

Smith made his debut for the Ospreys as a replacement against Connacht in February 2007. In July 2012 he signed an extension contract with the Ospreys after there was speculation linking him with London Irish.

== International ==
Despite being born in England, Smith captained the Wales under-21 team.
