= List of listed buildings in Bracadale, Highland =

This is a list of listed buildings in the parish of Bracadale on the Isle of Skye in Highland, Scotland.

== List ==
Name	Location	Date Listed	Grid Ref. (Note: Sometimes known as OSGB36, the grid reference (where provided) is based on the British national grid reference system used by the Ordnance Survey. • "Guide to National Grid". Ordnance Survey. • "Get-a-map". Ordnance Survey.)	Geo-coordinates	Notes	LB Number (Note: Historic Environment Scotland assign a unique alphanumeric identifier to each designated site in Scotland, for listed buildings this always begins with "LB", for example "LB12345".)	Image
Struan Inn				57°21′25″N 6°24′24″W	Category C(S)	6365	Upload Photo
Struan, Free Church Manse				57°21′24″N 6°24′54″W	Category C(S)	1786	Upload Photo
Borline, Kilmory Churches And Graveyard				57°14′57″N 6°21′08″W	Category B	1791	Upload Photo
Struan, Free Church				57°21′23″N 6°25′00″W	Category B	1784	Upload another image See more images
Gesto House				57°20′36″N 6°23′42″W	Category B	1792	Upload Photo
Glenbrittle House And Steading				57°12′35″N 6°17′18″W	Category B	1794	Upload Photo
Sligachan, Old Bridge (Over River Sligachan)				57°17′23″N 6°10′24″W	Category B	1783	Upload another image See more images
Struan, The Haven				57°21′23″N 6°24′59″W	Category C(S)	1785	Upload Photo
Talisker House				57°17′02″N 6°26′30″W	Category C(S)	1787	Upload Photo
Gesto Farm Square				57°20′32″N 6°23′45″W	Category B	1793	Upload Photo
Struan Inn, Out Building				57°21′27″N 6°24′26″W	Category B	6366	Upload Photo

== Key ==
The scheme for classifying buildings in Scotland is:

- Category A: "buildings of national or international importance, either architectural or historic; or fine, little-altered examples of some particular period, style or building type."
- Category B: "buildings of regional or more than local importance; or major examples of some particular period, style or building type, which may have been altered."
- Category C: "buildings of local importance; lesser examples of any period, style, or building type, as originally constructed or moderately altered; and simple traditional buildings which group well with other listed buildings."

In March 2016 there were 47,288 listed buildings in Scotland. Of these, 8% were Category A, and 50% were Category B, with the remaining 42% being Category C.

== See also ==
- List of listed buildings in Highland
