= Alex Blair =

Scottish rugby union player

- Born: Alexander Philip Blair; 16 November 1990 (age 35) Edinburgh, Scotland
- Height: 1.86 m (6 ft 1 in)
- Weight: 83 kg (13.1 st; 183 lb)
- Notable relative(s): Mike Blair, brother David Blair, brother

Rugby union career
- Position: Fly half
Amateur team(s)
Years	Team	Apps	(Points)
-2010	Edinburgh Academicals		
2010–11	Melrose		
2011–13	Edinburgh Academicals		
2013	Southern Districts		
2013–	Edinburgh Academicals		
Senior career
Years	Team	Apps	(Points)
2010–11	Edinburgh Rugby	1	(0)
- Sale Sharks
2013	Edinburgh Rugby		
International career
Years	Team	Apps	(Points)
- Scotland U20
–	Scotland 'A'		

11th Sir Willie Purves Quaich
- In office 2010–2010
- Preceded by: Richie Gray
- Succeeded by: Duncan Weir

Alex Blair (born 16 November 1990) is a Scotland 'A' international rugby union player.

== Rugby Union career ==
=== Amateur career ===
Impressing for Edinburgh Academicals, he was offered a contract by Edinburgh Rugby in 2010.

While with Edinburgh Rugby he played for Melrose.

He turned out for Edinburgh Academicals again when he was released by Edinburgh Rugby in 2011.

He played for Southern Districts in Australia in the summer of 2013.

When he was offered a trial to return to Edinburgh Rugby he was still playing for Edinburgh Academicals.

=== Professional career ===
Blair signed for Edinburgh Rugby in 2010. He played one match against Leinster in the Pro12.

He was released a year later in 2011 due to a back injury.

He had a spell with Sale Sharks.

He was offered the chance to train with Edinburgh Rugby again in 2013.

=== International career ===
He played for Scotland U20s.

Blair was capped by Scotland 'A'.

== Outside of rugby union ==
Blair studied sports science at Edinburgh College.
