= Mike Penn =

English rugby union player

Mike Penn (born 7 August 1989) is an English rugby union player for Moseley, having joined for the 2013–14 season from Edinburgh. He plays as a fullback or wing.

His former club is Worcester Warriors, whom he left in 2012. In May 2012, Penn signed a one-year contract with Edinburgh.

Penn was educated at Bromsgrove School in England. His elder brother Russell was a professional association football player and later a coach.
