= Chris Leck =

English rugby union player

- Born: 21 May 1986 (age 40) Manchester, England
- Height: 1.75 m (5 ft 9 in)
- Weight: 88 kg (13 st 12 lb)

Rugby union career
Youth career
- Burnley RUFC
Senior career
Years	Team	Apps	(Points)
2007-2011	Sale Sharks	11	(0)
2011-2014	Edinburgh	34	

Chris Leck (born 21 May 1986) is a rugby union player. He plays as a scrum-half.

He started his pro career at Sale Sharks where he remained up until the end of the 2011 season. He then signed for Edinburgh Rugby where he mainly played as understudy to Scottish internationalists Mike Blair & Greig Laidlaw as well as competing against Welsh cap Richie Rees 2014 in the Pro12.

His crowning moment came in the 2012 Heineken Cup quarter final game against Toulouse. Leck was summoned from the bench with Edinburgh trailing 14–7 at half time to help secure a famous 19–14 win, securing the club's first ever European cup semi-final appearance.

However, shortly afterwards he suffered a shoulder injury that would ultimately keep him out of the team for the next year, an injury that required three operations. With the departure of previous coach Michael Bradley and the appointment of Alan Solomons, along with the appearance of Scots youngsters Sean Kennedy & Sam Hidalgo-Clyne he was released from his contract at the end of the 2013–14 season having never played for his new coach.
