= Struan Dewar =

Scottish rugby union player

- Born: 6 July 1989 (age 37)
- Height: 6 ft 2 in (1.88 m)
- Weight: 14 st (89 kg)
- School: Strathallan School
- University: Heriot-Watt University

Rugby union career
- Position: Back-row
Senior career
Years	Team	Apps	(Points)
2010-12	Edinburgh	3	(0)
- Scotland U18
- Scotland U19
2009	Scotland U20	10	(5)
National sevens team
Years	Team		Comps
2008-15	Scotland 7s		35 (130)

Struan Douglas Dewar (born 6 July 1989) is a Scottish rugby union player.

He was a member of the Scotland national rugby sevens team between 2008-2015. Outwith those commitments he was available to play for Edinburgh Rugby.

== Career ==
Struan Dewar has played for Scotland at various age-group levels including the Under 20 2009 IRB Junior World Championship in Japan in which he played all five matches. He has played in numerous international tournaments for the Scotland sevens team including the IRB Sevens World Series.

As of 2015/16 he plays for Heriot's in the Scottish Premiership.
