= Steven Lawrie =

Scotland international rugby union player

Steve Lawrie
- Born: Steven Lawrie; 22 February 1984 (age 42) Haddington, Scotland
- Height: 6 ft 1 in (1.85 m)
- Weight: 103 kg (227 lb)
- School: Stewart's Melville College
- University: Edinburgh University

Rugby union career
- Position: Hooker
- Current team: Edinburgh Rugby
Amateur team(s)
Years	Team	Apps	(Points)
2002–03	Currie RFC		
2003–07	Watsonians RFC		
Senior career
Years	Team	Apps	(Points)
2005–09	Edinburgh	21	(0)
2009–11	Doncaster	16	(25)
2011–2014	Edinburgh	23	(5)
- Correct as of 19 May 2013
International career
Years	Team	Apps	(Points)
2013	Scotland	1	(0)
2010	Scotland A	2	(0)
–	Scotland U21		
–	Scotland U19		
–	Scotland U18		
- Correct as of 8 June 2013
National sevens team
Years	Team		Comps
2008	Scotland Sevens		

Steven Lawrie (born 22 February 1984) is a Scottish rugby union coach and former player who played for Edinburgh Rugby in the Pro12.

== Background ==
Steve has played for Scotland at A, under-21 and under-19 levels as well as appearing in the Scotland Sevens squad, making his debut in the 2008 London Sevens tournament and Twickenham and going on to play a week later in the 2008 Edinburgh Sevens at Murrayfield. His Scotland A debut came in the 25–0 win over the United States at Netherdale in November 2010, and he came off the bench in the victory over Italy A in January 2011. Steve captained the Edinburgh under-18, under-19, and under-20 teams who won their respective district championships in successive years (2002 to 2004), and he played for the Scotland under-19 team in the 2002–03 season.
