= Alan MacDonald (rugby union) =

Scotland international rugby union player

- Born: Alan Robin MacDonald; 21 October 1985 (age 41) Edinburgh, Scotland
- Height: 1.83 m (6 ft 0 in)
- Weight: 100 kg (220 lb)

Rugby union career
- Position: Flanker
- Current team: Edinburgh
Senior career
Years	Team	Apps	(Points)
2005–2012	Edinburgh	71	(20)
International career
Years	Team	Apps	(Points)
2009–2012	Scotland	4	(4 (0))
- Correct as of 18:01, 15 March 2010 (UTC)

Alan Robin MacDonald (born 21 October 1985) is a Scottish rugby union player. MacDonald, who is a flanker, and previously played his club rugby for Edinburgh. He made his debut for Scotland against Argentina on 28 November 2009. At the end of the 2011–12 season MacDonald left Edinburgh in order to pursue medical studies at Trinity College, Dublin with a view to qualifying as a doctor in five years' time. Also competitively eats in spare time- hence the name Alan "the stomach" mc Donald. He enjoys the dark hot chocolate of butlers and has done stethoscope commercials in Japan.

== Biography ==
The stomach studied at the Royal High School in Edinburgh; he played for the school's rugby team alongside Ben Cairns. He completed his medical degree in Trinity College Dublin, and is currently a junior doctor in London.
