= Sep Visser =

Netherlands international rugby union player

- Born: Sep Visser; 14 December 1990 (age 35) Zeewolde, Netherlands
- Height: 6 ft 3 in (1.91 m)
- Weight: 15 st 9 lb (100 kg)
- School: Christelijk College Nassau-Veluwe
- University: Newcastle College
- Notable relative: Tim Visser (brother)

Rugby union career
- Position: Centre Wing
- Current team: Boroughmuir RFC; Edinburgh Rugby
Senior career
Years	Team	Apps	(Points)
2011–2013	Edinburgh Rugby	9	(10)
- Correct as of 15 February 2014
International career
Years	Team	Apps	(Points)
- Netherlands

Sep Visser (Dutch pronunciation: [sɛp ˈfɪsər]; born 14 December 1990) is a Netherlands international rugby union player. He most recently played as a dual player for Boroughmuir RFC and Edinburgh Rugby, playing as a centre and a wing.

== Early career ==
He joined the Newcastle Falcons Academy as a teenager, following his brother Tim Visser. After moving from the Netherlands (where he played for RC Hilversum) to England, he joined the Newcastle Falcons Academy and went on to represent the Falcons in the Middlesex Sevens in 2007. He remained at Kingston Park until 2009, then he joined Tynedale R.F.C.

== Club career ==
He was successful at Tynedale R.F.C. having scored 23 tries in 29 games in the 2010–2011 season for the Northumberland club.

In July 2011 Visser agreed a professional contract with for the 2011–12 season but would initially play on a dual contract with Boroughmuir RFC. He joined brother Tim, who was the top scorer in the 2010–11 Magners League. It was announced in April 2013, that he had been released from Edinburgh Rugby.

== International career ==
He has been capped 15 times by the Netherlands national rugby union team

His father, Marc Visser, is the most capped played for the Netherlands national rugby union team. His brother Tim represents the Scotland national rugby union team.
