= Steven Turnbull (rugby union) =

Scottish rugby union player

- Born: Steven Turnbull; 10 April 1987 (age 39)
- Height: 6 ft 7 in (2.01 m)
- Weight: 119 kg (262 lb)
- School: Dunblane High School; Strathallan School
- University: Napier University

Rugby union career
- Position: Lock
- Current team: Edinburgh Rugby
Senior career
Years	Team	Apps	(Points)
2008–13	Edinburgh	48	(5)
- Correct as of 3 June 2013
International career
Years	Team	Apps	(Points)
–	Scotland U18		
–	Scotland U19		
–	Scotland U20		

Steven Turnbull (born 10 April 1987) is a former Scottish rugby union player who played for Edinburgh Rugby in the Pro12 from 2008 until 2013.

== Early life ==
Turnbull was educated at Dunblane High School and Strathallan School, Turnbull put his studies in sport and exercise science at Napier University on hold during his apprenticeship.

== Rugby career ==
Turnbull played for Caledonia under-16 and under-18 and Scotland under-18A and under-18. He also represented his country at basketball in the under-16 and under-18 groups. He was named Scotland Under-19 Player of the Year at the Scottish Rugby Awards Dinner in May 2006. Injury prevented his participation in other shadow Six Nations matches until the final game against France in March 2007.

He joined Edinburgh as a full-time professional during the summer of 2008 after graduating from the National Academy. He made his debut two years previously as a replacement in the draw with Connacht in the Celtic League match in Galway in September, and his first start followed two months later against Cardiff Blues at Murrayfield.

Turnbull formed a lock partnership with Richie Vernon in Scotland's four under-19 internationals in season 2005–06, before going on to play in four matches in the age group's world championship in Dubai. He added to his international honours by playing in the under-20 match against England at Bath in February 2007.

He was named in the Scotland A squad for the 2010 IRB Nations Cup.

In October 2011, Edinburgh extended his contract. He missed four months of the season in early 2012 after surgery on an injured ankle.

On 20 June 2013 he announced his retirement from rugby following a knee injury.
