= Dave Young (rugby union) =

Rugby union player from Northern Ireland

- Born: 18 February 1985 (age 41) Belfast, Northern Ireland
- Height: 1.85 m (6 ft 1 in)
- Weight: 117 kg (18 st 6 lb)
- School: Glenrothes High School

Rugby union career
- Position: Prop
Amateur team(s)
Years	Team	Apps	(Points)
- Glenrothes
Senior career
Years	Team	Apps	(Points)
2005–2008	Leicester Tigers	13	(0)
2008–2009	Gloucester Rugby	8	(0)
2009–2011	Edinburgh Rugby	0	(0)
2011–2012	Leeds Carnegie	0	(0)
2012–2013	Lazio	0	(0)
2013–2014	Jersey	0	(0)
2014–	NG Dragons	0	(0)

For the Welsh rugby union prop forward see Dai Young

Dave Young (born 18 February 1985 in Belfast, Northern Ireland) is a Scotland 'A' international rugby union prop. He plays for Jersey. He previously played for the Leicester Tigers, Gloucester, Edinburgh, Lazio, Leeds Carnegie and Jersey.

Young joined Newport Gwent Dragons for the 2014–15 season.
