= Sean Cox (rugby union) =

English rugby union player

- Born: 16 January 1985 (age 41) Lancaster, Lancashire
- Height: 1.95 m (6 ft 5 in)
- Weight: 113 kg (17 st 11 lb)
- School: Lancaster Royal Grammar School
- University: University of Leeds

Rugby union career
- Position: Lock
Senior career
Years	Team	Apps	(Points)
2004–11	Sale Sharks	93	(15)
2011–14	Edinburgh	63	(5)
2014-2015	London Irish	11	(0)
- Correct as of 20 December 2013

Sean Cox (born 16 January 1985 in Lancaster, Lancashire, England) is a rugby union player. Cox plays as a lock.

Cox played rugby at Lancaster Royal Grammar School, before being selected for the England under-19s in 2003.

In 2015, Cox retired from rugby to work in the finance sector. At the time he had completed a single season with London Irish, following 63 appearances for Edinburgh and 93 for Sale Sharks.
