= John Houston (rugby union) =

Scottish rugby union player

- Born: John Houston; 10 March 1983 (age 43) Edinburgh, Scotland
- Height: 6 ft 2 in (1.88 m)
- Weight: 15 st 7 lb (98.4 kg)
- School: Hawick High School
- University: Heriot-Watt University
- Occupation: Professional rugby union player

Rugby union career
- Position: Centre or Wing
- Current team: Edinburgh Rugby
Amateur team(s)
Years	Team	Apps	(Points)
- Hawick Wanderers
- Hawick RFC
-2007	Heriot's		
- Correct as of 22 June 2008
Senior career
Years	Team	Apps	(Points)
2007–present	Edinburgh	85	(25)
- Correct as of 3 June 2013
International career
Years	Team	Apps	(Points)
2007–present	Scotland A	7	
National sevens team
Years	Team		Comps
	Scotland		Edinburgh Sevens

John Houston (born 10 March 1983) is a Scottish professional rugby Centre or Wing, currently with Edinburgh Rugby. Houston also plays for Scotland's national rugby sevens team.

Houston won the club's Newcomer of the Year award after his rookie season and went on to help the Scotland A side clinch the IRB Nations Cup in June 2009.

Recording 16 starts in his first campaign as a professional, Houston scored on his home debut against Ulster in September 2008 before repeating the feat on his Heineken Cup debut against Toulouse in November – the effort which won him Edinburgh's Try of the Season award.

He had previously been part of the Hawick side that won the Scottish Premiership Division One, the Scottish Cup and Border League honours in 2001–02.
