= Jack Gilding =

English rugby union player

- Born: Jack Philip Robert Gilding; March 10, 1988 (age 38) Plymouth
- Height: 5 ft 10 in (1.78 m)
- Weight: 260 lb (120 kg; 18 st 8 lb)

Rugby union career
- Position: Prop
Senior career
Years	Team	Apps	(Points)
2009-2010	Worcester Warriors		
2010-2014	Viadana		
2014-	London Welsh		

Jack Gilding (born 10 March 1988) is a rugby union player for London Welsh.

He hails from Plymouth and attended St Boniface's Catholic College, but qualifies to play for the Scotland national rugby union team through his Scottish Grandmother.

He plays as a tighthead prop. He previously played for Worcester Warriors.
