= David Blair (rugby union) =

Scottish rugby union player

- Born: July 14, 1985 (age 41) Edinburgh, Scotland
- Height: 5 ft 11 in (1.80 m)
- Weight: 176 lb (80 kg; 12 st 8 lb)
- School: St Leonards School
- University: University of Stirling

Rugby union career
- Position(s): Fullback, Fly-half
Senior career
Years	Team	Apps	(Points)
2005-2007	Sale Sharks	6	(16)
2007-2011	Edinburgh	55	(162)
International career
Years	Team	Apps	(Points)
2009-2010	Scotland A	5	(23)

David William Blair (born 14 July 1985) is a Scottish former rugby union player who played Stand Off and played for Sale Sharks from 2003 to 2007 and then Edinburgh Gunners in the Magners League from 2007 to 2011. Blair was captain and the highest points scorer for Scotland Under 21 in the team's history. He is the younger brother of Scotland captain Mike Blair who also plays for Edinburgh, as did a third brother Alex. David Blair started at Sale Sharks and then moved to Edinburgh to join up with his brother. David has also represented Scotland A team on several occasions.

An injury to Phil Godman in September 2010 made him the first choice standoff for Edinburgh. He started with a man of the match performance to beat Leinster.
