= James King (rugby union, born 1986) =

Scottish rugby union player (born 1986)

- Born: James King; 31 March 1986 (age 40) Berwick-upon-Tweed, England
- Height: 5 ft 10 in (1.78 m)
- Weight: 86 kg (190 lb)
- School: Berwick High School

Rugby union career
- Position: Centre
- Current team: Edinburgh Rugby
Amateur team(s)
Years	Team	Apps	(Points)
2008–10	Melrose RFC		
Senior career
Years	Team	Apps	(Points)
2004 2007	Border Reivers	4	(15)
2007–08	L'Aquila		
2010–13	Edinburgh	30	(5)
- Correct as of 3 June 2013
International career
Years	Team	Apps	(Points)
- Scotland U21
–	Scotland U19		
–	Scotland U18		

James King (born 31 March 1986) was a Scottish rugby union player who played for Edinburgh Rugby in the Pro14.

== Background ==
He has also represented Scotland at U18, U19 and U21 level and was educated at Berwick High School. He has had spells with both Border Reivers and L'Aquila, the outfit from central Italy.

King scored his first try for the club away to Connacht in April 2011, and followed this up by signing a two-year contract extension four days later.

He retired in 2013.
