= Scott Newlands =

Scottish rugby union player

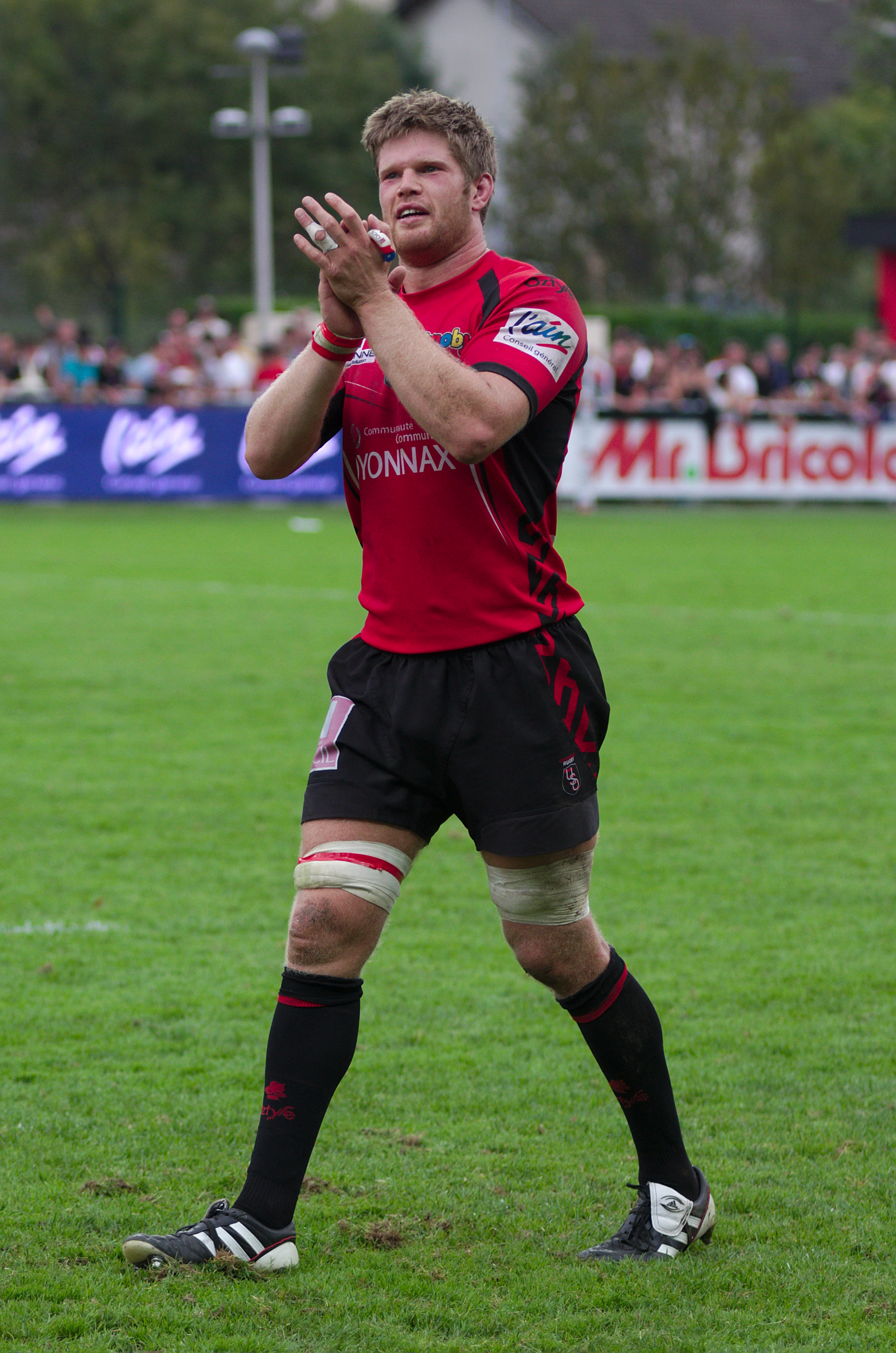
- Born: Scott Newlands; 1985 (age 40–41) Kelso, Scottish Borders, Scotland

Rugby union career
Amateur team(s)
Years	Team	Apps	(Points)
- Kelso RFC
–	Heriot's Rugby Club		
Senior career
Years	Team	Apps	(Points)
- US Carcassonne
–	Oyonnax Rugby		
–	Edinburgh Rugby		
International career
Years	Team	Apps	(Points)
- Scotland A

Scott Newlands (born 1985) is a former Scottish professional rugby player, currently coaching the French ProD2 team Valence Romans Drome Rugby. He comes from Kelso and has previously played rugby professionally at US Carcassonne, Oyonnax Rugby, Edinburgh Rugby and at amateur level for Kelso RFC and Heriot's Rugby Club. Newlands has also played for Scotland's national rugby sevens team, as well as for Scotland A in the Churchill Cup.
