= Tim Visser =

Scotland international rugby union player

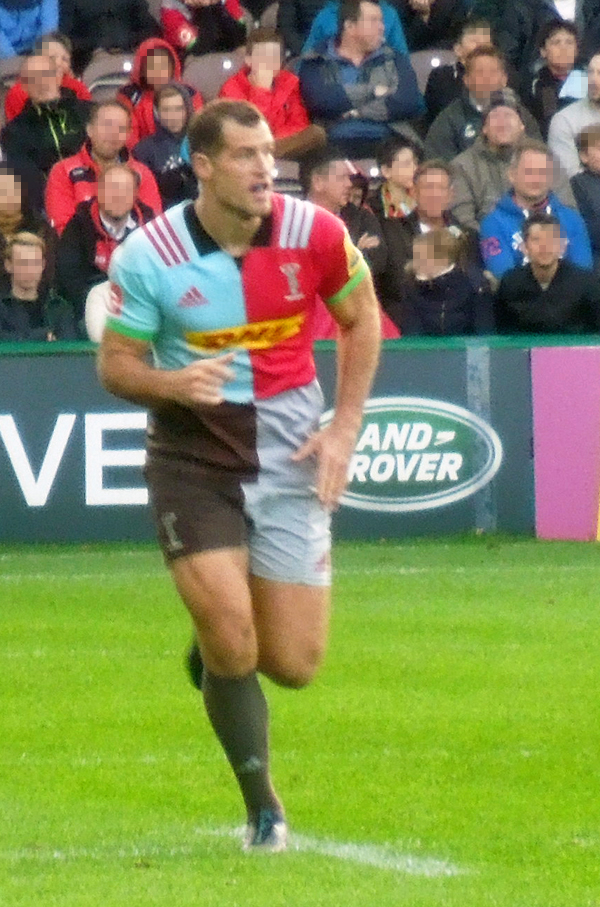
- Born: Tim Jan Willem Visser; 29 May 1987 (age 39) De Bilt, Utrecht, Netherlands
- Height: 1.95 m (6 ft 5 in)
- Weight: 109 kg (17 st 2 lb; 240 lb)
- School: Christelijk College Nassau-Veluwe; Barnard Castle School
- Notable relative: Sep Visser (brother)

Rugby union career
- Position(s): Wing, Full-Back
Senior career
Years	Team	Apps	(Points)
2007–2009	Newcastle Falcons	57	(65)
2010–2015	Edinburgh	130	(345)
2015–2019	Harlequins	57	(150)
International career
Years	Team	Apps	(Points)
2012–2017	Scotland	33	(70)
2011	Barbarians	1	(10)
- Correct as of 24 June 2017

Tim Visser (Dutch pronunciation: [tɪɱ ˈvɪsər]; born 29 May 1987) is a former professional rugby union player who played as a winger. Born in the Netherlands, Visser represented the Scotland national team between 2012 and 2017.

== Early life ==
Visser was born in De Bilt, Netherlands. He was brought up in Maartensdijk and played for RC Hilversum, the club where his father played. He joined the Newcastle Falcons Academy as a teenager, after having been spotted playing in the Amsterdam Sevens. On moving to England he joined Barnard Castle School and went on to represent England Schools at under-18 level in 2005.

== Career ==
=== Newcastle Falcons ===
Having signed a two-year contract with Newcastle in April 2007, he started the 2007–08 season on loan with the recently relegated Northampton Saints.

Visser made his competitive debut in the English Premiership on 8 September 2006 against Worcester, coming on as a substitute and scoring the winning try. He played a further 10 games for the Falcons in his first season, scoring four tries in total, before finishing the season on loan to Darlington Mowden Park, a National Division Three club.

The 2008–09 season saw Visser add another five tries for Newcastle in 21 appearances, but at the end of the season he chose to sign for the Celtic League club Edinburgh.

=== Edinburgh ===
Visser was the top try scorer in the Pro12 league in each of his first four seasons for Edinburgh.

In his first season in the Scottish capital Visser became top scorer in the Magners League with 10 tries, winning the Young Player of the Season Award and being named in the Magners League Dream Team. In the 2010–11 season he again became top try scorer with 14 tries. He was again included in the Magners League Dream Team. Visser finished the 2011–12 Pro12 season with 13 tries, again being the league's top try scorer. With Edinburgh, Visser also reached the semi-finals of the 2011–12 Heineken Cup, scoring four tries in total during the competition, and was selected for the third consecutive season to the RaboDirect Pro12 Dream Team. In addition he was voted the Player's Player of the Season.

In March 2015 it was announced that Visser would move on from Edinburgh at the end of the season to join Harlequins.

=== Barbarians ===
On 29 May 2011, his 24th birthday, Visser made his debut for the Barbarians against England. Visser scored two tries, including a last effort try which saw the Barbarians snatch away the victory from England at Twickenham.

== International career ==
Visser opted not to play for the Netherlands in order to become eligible to play test rugby for one of the Home Nations. World Rugby eligibility rules state that a player may play for a country's national team after 3 years of residency. Visser stated in 2011 that he wished to play for Scotland when he became eligible in June 2012. Scotland coach Andy Robinson named Visser to the 28-player squad for Scotland's tour of Oceania in June 2012. He completed his three years of residency on 12 June and thus was not available for the match in Australia on 5 June, but was available for their two remaining tests against Fiji and Samoa.

Visser made his Scotland debut against Fiji on 16 June and scored two tries in a 37–25 win. Visser made his home debut against New Zealand on 11 November 2012 during the autumn internationals, scoring two tries.

Two tries in the defeat of Italy in August 2015 helped Visser clinch a place in the 31-man squad for the 2015 Rugby World Cup.

On 3 May 2018 Tim Visser announced his retirement from international rugby.

=== International tries ===
Try	Opponent	City/Country	Venue	Competition	Year
[1–2]	Fiji	Lautoka, Fiji	Churchill Park	Summer Tour	2012
[3–4]	New Zealand	Edinburgh, Scotland	Murrayfield Stadium	Autumn Test	2012
[5]	Italy	Edinburgh, Scotland	Murrayfield Stadium	Six Nations	2013
[6]	France	Saint-Denis, France	Stade de France	Six Nations	2013
[7]	United States	Houston, USA	BBVA Compass	Summer Tour	2014
[8–9]	Italy	Edinburgh, Scotland	Murrayfield Stadium	World Cup warm-up	2015
[10]	United States	Leeds, England	Elland Road	2015 Rugby World Cup	2015
[11]	France	Edinburgh, Scotland	Murrayfield Stadium	Six Nations	2016
[12]	Wales	Edinburgh, Scotland	Murrayfield Stadium	Six Nations	2017
[13]	Italy	Edinburgh, Scotland	Murrayfield Stadium	Six Nations	2017
[14]	Italy	Singapore	National Stadium	Summer Tour	2017

== Awards/Records ==
- Celtic League Dream Team 2009–10
- Celtic League Dream Team 2010–11
- Pro12 Dream Team 2011–12
- Celtic League Young Player of the Year 2009–10
- Pro12 Players' Player of the Year 2011–12
- Most tries scored by a player in one Celtic League/Pro12 season – 14
- Record Edinburgh try scorer with 59 tries (in all competitions Pro12, Heineken Cup, and Challenge Cup)

== Controversies ==
=== 2026 criminal charges ===
On 22 October 2026, Visser was charged with four formal offences in the Glasgow High Court spanning a 14-year period in the United Kingdom and the Netherlands. One of the charges is rape alongside two counts of coercive and abusive behaviour, comprising 26 specific claims such as non-consensual taking and sharing of intimate images, physical violence, persistent harassment, social isolation, and extreme control over the alleged victims daily life, appearance, and finances. The prosecutors also intend to introduce evidence of additional uncharged controlling and violent incidents dating back to 2004, though Visser has entered a plea of not guilty to all counts ahead of his scheduled trial in January 2028.
