= Ben Cairns =

Scotland international rugby union player

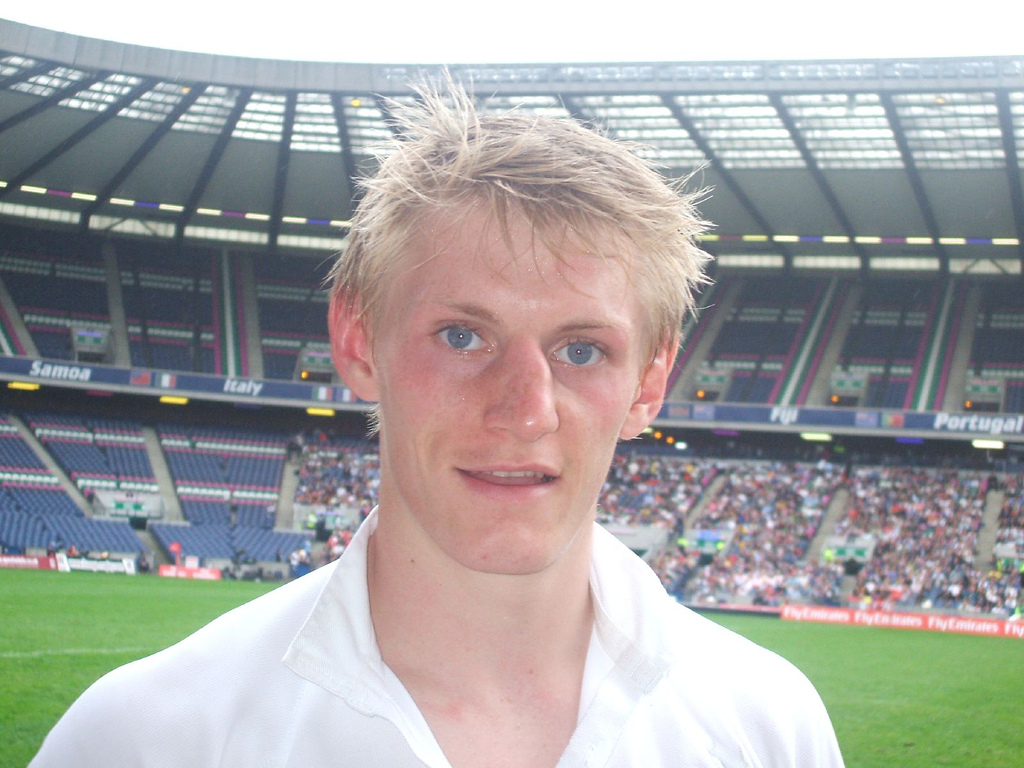
- Born: Benjamin James Cairns; 29 September 1985 (age 41) Leeds, England
- Height: 1.83 m (6 ft 0 in)
- Weight: 98 kg (15 st 6 lb)
- School: Royal High School
- Notable relative: Mark Cairns

Rugby union career
- Position: Centre / Full-back / Wing
- Current team: Retired
Senior career
Years	Team	Apps	(Points)
2004–14	Edinburgh	117	(135)
2006	→Glasgow Warriors	1	(0)
International career
Years	Team	Apps	(Points)
2008–2014	Scotland	8	(5)

Ben Cairns (born 29 September 1985 in Leeds) is a former Scotland rugby union international who played for Edinburgh Rugby in the Pro12.

Cairns' position of choice is as a Centre and he can also operate at Full-back and on the Wing. He won his First Cap for Scotland in Rosario against Argentina and then won his Second in Buenos Aires against the same Opponents a Week later. Before that he was called up to the Scotland squad for the 2008 Six Nations Championship but was not used.

Cairns' retirement from professional rugby due to injury was announced on 24 February 2014.

== Club career ==
Cairns played at Currie RFC alongside his brother, former Scotland under-21 internationalist Mark, prior to his signing for the Scottish Pro12 team Edinburgh Rugby on a development contract in 2004, making his debut for the team in the 2005–06 season. Bizarrely, even though Cairns was a contracted apprentice with Edinburgh, he his Celtic League debut by playing for Glasgow Warriors as a replacement while on loan for the match against Ospreys in January 2006. He made his first competitive appearance in the black and red in May 2006, during Edinburgh’s Magners League match against Leinster at Murrayfield.

Cairns was soon singled out as one of the young Scotland backs that may be able to break their distressing lack of creativity in the long-term after some sharp displays at regional level for Edinburgh in both the Magners League and Heineken Cup. He established himself in the team the following season, becoming an important part of the first team. Cairns was voted Edinburgh’s Young Player of the Year for the 2007–08 season. He was selected as Edinburgh captain for the first time in the League match against Newport Gwent Dragons in February 2008 and he responded with a try, underlining his growing importance to the team. The same year he recorded his 50th appearance for Edinburgh against Wasps in December 2008.

He agreed a new three-season contract in May 2010, a deal that will see him spend his prime years at the capital club. His 100th club appearance came in the 1872 Cup derby against Glasgow Warriors at Firhill in December 2010.

He suffered a pre-season knee injury with Edinburgh Rugby that ruled him out of the entire 2011–12 season, with his attention fixed on a 2012–13 return. He made his return to first team action in the Heiniken cup against Racing Metro in December 2012 following that with another appearance against Munster in January 2013.

== International career ==
Cairns had already represented Scotland at all age-grade levels and 'A' level before making the step-up to full international level. He is the joint-leading try-scorer for the U21 side alongside club mate Nick De Luca and has skippered both the U18 and U19 sides as well as in the IRB sevens circuit.

In March 2007, he made his Scotland A debut as a substitute in the victory against Italy A at McDiarmid Park, Perth. He scored his first Scotland A try in the 37–15 victory against their Italian counterparts in Mogliano, near Venice, in February 2008, and followed up with another score in the 67–7 win against Ireland A three weeks later at McDiarmid Park.

He went on to make his Scotland debut in the first Test loss to Argentina in June 2008 before playing a crucial part in the victory over the Pumas the following week tying the series one all.

He won further caps against New Zealand and South Africa during the 2008 autumn internationals before scoring his first Test try against Canada at Pittodrie. In January 2009 he was selected in Frank Hadden's squad for the 2009 Six Nations.

Cairns made a solitary appearance in the tournament, at outside centre against Wales, and was to make only one other international appearance in 2009. His slide out of the international picture continued in 2010, although at club level he made his 100th appearance for Edinburgh and secured a new three-year deal. Despite missing out on the 2011 Six Nations, he was called up to Scotland's provisional World Cup squad In May but missed out on a place in the final squad before suffering the knee injury that kept him out of action for over the next year.
