= David Denton =

Scotland international rugby union player

- Born: David Kipling Denton; 5 February 1990 (age 36) Marondera, Zimbabwe
- Height: 1.96 m (6 ft 5 in)
- Weight: 119 kg (18 st 10 lb; 262 lb)
- School: Kingswood College, South Africa
- University: Edinburgh University

Rugby union career
- Position: Loose forward
Senior career
Years	Team	Apps	(Points)
2010–2015	Edinburgh	79	(40)
2015–2017	Bath	17	(0)
2017–2018	Worcester Warriors	22	(25)
2018–2019	Leicester Tigers	6	(5)
- Correct as of 16 April 2019
International career
Years	Team	Apps	(Points)
2010	Scotland U20	10	(0)
2011–2019	Scotland	42	(0)
- Correct as of 23 June 2018

13th Sir Willie Purves Quaich
- In office 2012–2012
- Preceded by: Duncan Weir
- Succeeded by: Sean Kennedy

David Kipling Denton (born 5 February 1990) is a retired Zimbabwean-born Scottish rugby union player. He played in the back row, but could also play in the second row, and represented Edinburgh in the Pro12, Bath, Worcester Warriors and Leicester Tigers in England, and Scotland internationally.

== Background ==
Denton was born in Zimbabwe, and qualified for Scotland as his mother was born in Glasgow. He attended Peterhouse Boys School in Zimbabwe, before moving to Kingswood College in the Eastern Cape in South Africa, where he made several appearances for Eastern Province in Port Elizabeth.

== Rugby playing career ==
=== Club career ===
He moved to Edinburgh to study economics at the University of Edinburgh. While at university he played for Edinburgh Academicals. Although he struggled to begin with, playing in the 3rd XV for much of his first season, he advanced into the Accies' 2nd team, "TWAYS", under the tutelage of Malcolm McVie. He was brought into the Scotland under-20s set-up before playing for the Scottish National Academy. He was then awarded a professional contract at Edinburgh for the 2010–11 season.

His performances in his debut season lead him to being selected for Scotland's extended World Cup squad in the build-up to the showpiece. As well as his defensive capabilities, Denton is known to be an effective ball carrier due to his strength and agility (particularly for a man of his size — 1.96m and 119 kg).

In December 2013, Denton ended speculation about his future (which had seen him linked with a move to the Aviva Premiership) by signing a contract extension which saw him remain at Murrayfield until 2015.

On 10 November 2015, Denton signed for English club Bath Rugby who compete in the Aviva Premiership from the 2015–16 season.

On 30 May 2017, it was announced Denton would move from Bath to local rivals Worcester Warriors for the 2017–18 season. On 14 February 2018 Leicester Tigers announced the signing of Denton from Worcester for the 2018–19 season. Denton was forced to retire from rugby due to concussion in September 2019.

=== International career ===
Denton made his debut for Scotland, coming on off the bench in the 10–6 win over Ireland in the Rugby World Cup warm-up matches in August 2011. However, he was not named in the final squad for the tournament. He also appeared in all of Scotland's under-20 side's games in 2010, five games in the 2010 Six Nations Under 20s Championship and in the IRB Junior World Championship. He has appeared for the Scottish Sevens team in 2010 in the Dubai and George events.

Denton won the "man of the match" award, despite being on the losing side, in Scotland's 6–13 defeat to England in the opening game of the 6 Nations on 4 February 2012. Denton was "Man of the Match" in the 6 Nations match against France on 8 March 2014 despite being on the losing side. Following the announcement of the 6 Nations Squad for the 2018 tournament, Denton was recalled into the team after a notable absence from the Scotland side since the summer tour of Japan in 2016.

=== Concussion ===
Denton retired from rugby in September 2019 after almost 14 months of not playing due to debilitating concussion.

In November 2024 Denton joined a group of 390 rugby union players taking part in a concussion lawsuit against the sport's authorities.
