= Mike Blair =

British Lions & Scotland international rugby union player

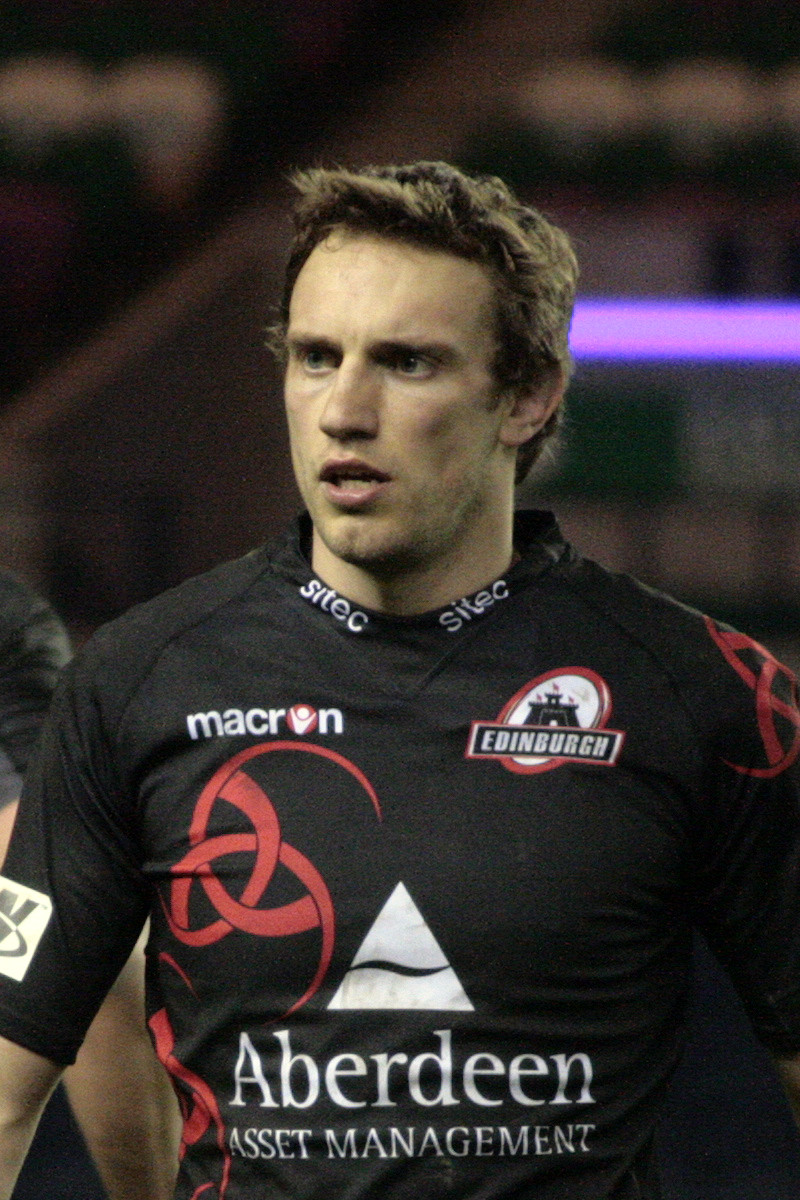
- Born: Michael Robert Leighton Blair; 20 April 1981 (age 45) Edinburgh, Scotland
- Height: 1.83 m (6 ft 0 in)
- Weight: 85 kg (13 st 5 lb)
- School: Edinburgh Academy
- University: Durham University; Edinburgh University
- Notable relative(s): David Blair; Alex Blair

Rugby union career
- Position: Scrum-half
Amateur team(s)
Years	Team	Apps	(Points)
-	Edinburgh Academicals		
–	Boroughmuir		
Senior career
Years	Team	Apps	(Points)
2002–12	Edinburgh	169	(78)
2012–13	CA Brive	24	(5)
2013–15	Newcastle Falcons	34	(15)
2015–16	Glasgow Warriors	12	(0)
International career
Years	Team	Apps	(Points)
- Scotland U19
- Scotland U21
- Scotland A
2002–12	Scotland	85	(35)
2009	British & Irish Lions	0	(0)
National sevens team
Years	Team		Comps
- Scotland
Coaching career
- Years: Team
- 2014–15: Ponteland RFC (Assistant)
- 2016–19: Glasgow Warriors (Assistant)
- 2017–21: Scotland (Assistant)
- 2021: Scotland (Interim head coach)
- 2021–23: Edinburgh
- 2023-26: Kobe Steelers (Assistant)
- 2026-: New Zealand (Attack)

Michael Robert Leighton Blair (born 20 April 1981) is a Scottish rugby union coach and former professional player. He is currently the attack coach for the New Zealand national team. He was previously an assistant coach of the Kobe Steelers, head coach of Edinburgh, assistant coach with Glasgow Warriors and then an assistant coach of the Scotland national team.

He played at scrum-half for Glasgow Warriors, Newcastle Falcons, Brive and Edinburgh. He represented Scotland 85 times, a record for a scrum half, as well as touring with the British & Irish Lions in 2009. He retired from playing on 21 April 2016 aged 35. He was the first Scottish player to be nominated for the IRB World Player of the Year award. He was inducted into the Scottish Rugby Hall of Fame in October 2025.

Blair started his coaching career at Glasgow Warriors, before his appointment as Scotland attack coach. He was acting head coach for Scotland's summer tour in 2021 before being appointed as head coach of Edinburgh Rugby. He stepped down from this role to focus on attack and skills coaching. He accepted the role of attack coach at Kobe Steelers in 2023 working alongside head coach Dave Rennie. In March 2026, he became attack coach of New Zealand, again working with Rennie.

== Playing career ==
Blair spent most of his club career at Edinburgh, and was named in the Pro12 Dream team at the end of the 2007/08 season.

Blair was Edinburgh Player of the year in 2006 and 2008, Scotland Pro Team Player of the Year in 2008, and Scotland Player of the Year in 2008. He was nominated for the IRB Player of the Year in 2008, the first Scot to be nominated for this award. That year he featured in a list of the 50 best rugby players in the world by The Independent newspaper.

Blair spent the 2012–13 season playing in France with Brive helping them to gain promotion back to the Top 14.

Blair then returned to the UK to play for the Newcastle Falcons in the English Premiership. He joined Glasgow Warriors for the 2015/16 season, becoming Glasgow Warrior No. 248 and he finished this playing career at the club.

=== International ===
Blair's international debut came on 15 June 2002 against Canada and scored his first try in the same game.

Blair was a member of Scotland's 2003, 2007 and 2011 World Cup squads.

Blair was injured playing for Edinburgh against the Llanelli Scarlets in January 2007 and required surgery on his shoulder which prevented him from playing in the entire 2007 Six Nations Championship.

Blair was made captain of Scotland for the first time against Ireland in the 2008 Six Nations Championship and for the next 12 consecutive games. At the 2008 Six Nations, he captained his squad to a 15–9 victory over England at Murrayfield to win the 2008 Calcutta Cup. He captained the national side 14 times in total.

Blair made his 50th appearance against Argentina in 2008 (2nd test).

Having been left out of the original Lions touring squad to South Africa in 2009, Blair was called up as a replacement for the injured Tomás O'Leary on 11 May, starting against The Presidents XV and the Southern Kings and coming off the bench against the Sharks.

Blair was included in Scotland's 2011 Rugby World Cup Squad. He scored the first try in the team's first match against Romania on 10 September, a 34–24 victory to Scotland. He started against England later in the tournament winning his 75th cap. Blair earned his final cap before retirement against South Africa in November 2012.

Blair won 85 caps and is Scotland's most capped scrum-half of all time.

== Coaching career ==
In the 2014–15 season, Blair became assistant coach of Ponteland Rugby Club.

After finishing playing with Glasgow Warriors, Blair then became an assistant coach at the club, first under Gregor Townsend and then under Dave Rennie.

Townsend brought Blair into the Scotland coaching set-up and he was assistant coach to Scotland.

He moved to become a head coach at Edinburgh. After a relatively successful first season with Edinburgh, his side finished higher than Glasgow Warriors for the first time in over a decade, the second season proved lacklustre. Blair quit Edinburgh as head coach, reasoning that he preferred the more hands-on role as an attack coach.

For the 2023-24 season, he will once again team up with his former Glasgow Warriors boss Dave Rennie as assistant coach. Rennie will be the head coach of Kobe Steelers.

On March 24 2026, Blair was announced as the new attack coach for the All Blacks working under Dave Rennie.

== Personal life ==
Blair attended the Edinburgh Academy. He is married with two children.

Blair has an older brother Peter, and two younger brothers, David and Alex. David played fly half for Sale Sharks and Edinburgh Rugby between 2007 and 2011, and Alex, who also played for Edinburgh Rugby from 2010 to 2011.
