= 2015 Six Nations Championship squads =

Rugby union competition squads

This is a list of the complete squads for the 2015 Six Nations Championship, an annual rugby union tournament contested by the national rugby teams of England, France, Ireland, Italy, Scotland and Wales. Ireland are the defending champions.

Note: Number of caps and players' ages are indicated as of 6 February 2015 – the tournament's opening day.

== England ==
On 21 January, England announced a 34-man squad for the 2015 Six Nations Championship, including 2 uncapped players.

Head coach: (England) Stuart Lancaster

Note: Flags indicate national union for the club/province as defined by World Rugby.

Player	Position	Date of birth (age)	Caps	Club/province
Dylan Hartley	Hooker	24 March 1986 (aged 28)	61	(England) Northampton Saints
Tom Youngs	Hooker	28 January 1987 (aged 28)	17	(England) Leicester Tigers
Dan Cole	Prop	9 May 1987 (aged 27)	45	(England) Leicester Tigers
Alex Corbisiero	Prop	30 August 1988 (aged 26)	19	(England) Northampton Saints
Joe Marler	Prop	7 July 1990 (aged 24)	26	(England) Harlequins
Mako Vunipola	Prop	13 January 1991 (aged 24)	15	(England) Saracens
David Wilson	Prop	9 April 1985 (aged 29)	41	(England) Bath
Dave Attwood	Lock	5 April 1987 (aged 27)	16	(England) Bath
Graham Kitchener	Lock	29 September 1989 (aged 25)	0	(England) Leicester Tigers
George Kruis	Lock	22 February 1990 (age 36)	4	(England) Saracens
Geoff Parling	Lock	28 October 1983 (aged 31)	21	(England) Leicester Tigers
Calum Clark	Flanker	10 June 1989 (aged 25)	0	(England) Northampton Saints
James Haskell	Flanker	2 April 1985 (aged 29)	53	(England) Wasps
Chris Robshaw (c)	Flanker	4 June 1986 (aged 28)	32	(England) Harlequins
Tom Wood	Flanker	3 November 1986 (aged 28)	34	(England) Northampton Saints
Nick Easter	Number 8	15 August 1978 (aged 36)	47	(England) Harlequins
Billy Vunipola	Number 8	3 November 1992 (aged 22)	12	(England) Saracens
Danny Care	Scrum-half	2 January 1987 (aged 28)	50	(England) Harlequins
Richard Wigglesworth	Scrum-half	9 June 1983 (aged 31)	16	(England) Saracens
Ben Youngs	Scrum-half	5 September 1989 (aged 25)	42	(England) Leicester Tigers
Danny Cipriani	Fly-half	2 November 1987 (aged 27)	9	(England) Sale Sharks
Owen Farrell	Fly-half	24 September 1991 (aged 23)	29	(England) Saracens
George Ford	Fly-half	16 March 1993 (aged 21)	6	(England) Bath
Stephen Myler	Fly-half	21 July 1984 (aged 30)	1	(England) Northampton Saints
Brad Barritt	Centre	7 August 1986 (aged 28)	22	(England) Saracens
Luther Burrell	Centre	6 December 1987 (aged 27)	7	(England) Northampton Saints
Kyle Eastmond	Centre	17 July 1989 (aged 25)	6	(England) Bath
Jonathan Joseph	Centre	21 May 1991 (aged 23)	6	(England) Bath
Billy Twelvetrees	Centre	15 November 1988 (aged 26)	16	(England) Gloucester
Jonny May	Wing	1 April 1990 (aged 24)	11	(England) Gloucester
Jack Nowell	Wing	11 April 1993 (aged 21)	5	(England) Exeter Chiefs
Anthony Watson	Wing	26 February 1994 (aged 20)	4	(England) Bath
Mike Brown	Fullback	4 September 1985 (aged 29)	33	(England) Harlequins
Alex Goode	Fullback	7 May 1988 (aged 26)	16	(England) Saracens

=== Call-ups ===
On 26 January, Tom Croft and Christian Day were added to the squad to cover the injured Tom Wood and Geoff Parling.

On 27 January, Owen Farrell was ruled out the whole Championship.

On 29 January, Kieran Brookes was added to the squad as injury cover for David Wilson.

On 31 January, Henry Slade was added to the squad as injury cover for Kyle Eastmond, while Henry Thomas has also been added to the squad as injury cover in the front row. Sam Burgess was also invited by head coach Stuart Lancaster to train with the senior squad, to continue his learning process in union.

On 12 February, David Wilson was ruled out of the whole Championship.

On 24 February, Chris Pennell was added to the squad as a precautionary injury cover for Mike Brown ahead of the Round 3 clash against Ireland.

On 9 March, Sam Burgess, Courtney Lawes and Rob Webber were added to the squad ahead of the Scotland clash in round 4.

Note: Flags indicate national union for the club/province as defined by World Rugby.

Player	Position	Date of birth (age)	Caps	Club/province
Rob Webber	Hooker	1 August 1986 (aged 28)	12	(England) Bath
Kieran Brookes	Prop	29 August 1990 (aged 24)	6	(England) Newcastle Falcons
Henry Thomas	Prop	30 October 1991 (aged 23)	7	(England) Bath
Christian Day	Lock	24 June 1983 (aged 31)	0	(England) Northampton Saints
Courtney Lawes	Lock	23 February 1989 (aged 25)	36	(England) Northampton Saints
Tom Croft	Flanker	7 November 1985 (aged 29)	38	(England) Leicester Tigers
Sam Burgess	Centre	14 December 1988 (aged 26)	0	(England) Bath
Henry Slade	Centre	19 March 1993 (aged 21)	0	(England) Exeter Chiefs
Chris Pennell	Fullback	26 April 1987 (aged 27)	1	(England) Worcester Warriors

== France ==
On 15 January, France named a 31-man squad for the 2015 Six Nations Championship. Additional players maybe added to the squad throughout the tournament due to the selection formart the FFR uses during the Six Nations and End-of-year tests.

Head coach: (France) Philippe Saint-André

Note: Flags indicate national union for the club/province as defined by World Rugby.

Player	Position	Date of birth (age)	Caps	Club/province
Guilhem Guirado	Hooker	17 June 1986 (aged 28)	26	(France) Toulon
Benjamin Kayser	Hooker	26 July 1984 (aged 30)	27	(France) Clermont
Uini Atonio	Prop	26 March 1990 (aged 24)	3	(France) La Rochelle
Eddy Ben Arous	Prop	25 August 1990 (aged 24)	1	(France) Racing Métro
Nicolas Mas	Prop	23 May 1980 (aged 34)	76	(France) Montpellier
Alexandre Menini	Prop	5 August 1983 (aged 31)	5	(France) Toulon
Rabah Slimani	Prop	18 October 1989 (aged 25)	10	(France) Stade Français
Alexandre Flanquart	Lock	9 October 1989 (aged 25)	10	(France) Stade Français
Yoann Maestri	Lock	14 January 1988 (aged 27)	31	(France) Toulouse
Pascal Papé	Lock	5 October 1980 (aged 34)	57	(France) Stade Français
Romain Taofifénua	Lock	14 September 1990 (aged 24)	3	(France) Toulon
Thierry Dusautoir (c)	Flanker	18 November 1981 (aged 33)	70	(France) Toulouse
Bernard Le Roux	Flanker	4 June 1989 (aged 25)	11	(France) Racing Métro
Yannick Nyanga	Flanker	19 December 1983 (aged 31)	40	(France) Toulouse
Charles Ollivon	Flanker	11 May 1993 (aged 21)	2	(France) Bayonne
Damien Chouly	Number 8	27 November 1985 (aged 29)	24	(France) Clermont
Louis Picamoles	Number 8	5 February 1986 (aged 29)	44	(France) Toulouse
Rory Kockott	Scrum-half	25 June 1986 (aged 28)	3	(France) Castres
Sébastien Tillous-Borde	Scrum-half	29 April 1985 (aged 29)	11	(France) Toulon
Camille Lopez	Fly-half	3 April 1989 (aged 25)	5	(France) Clermont
Rémi Talès	Fly-half	2 May 1984 (aged 30)	13	(France) Castres
Mathieu Bastareaud	Centre	17 September 1988 (aged 26)	28	(France) Toulon
Alexandre Dumoulin	Centre	24 August 1989 (aged 25)	2	(France) Racing Métro
Wesley Fofana	Centre	20 January 1988 (aged 27)	30	(France) Clermont
Rémi Lamerat	Centre	14 January 1990 (aged 25)	3	(France) Castres
Sofiane Guitoune	Wing	27 March 1989 (aged 25)	2	(France) Bordeaux Bègles
Yoann Huget	Wing	2 June 1987 (aged 27)	33	(France) Toulouse
Noa Nakaitaci	Wing	11 July 1990 (aged 24)	0	(France) Clermont
Teddy Thomas	Wing	18 September 1993 (aged 21)	2	(France) Racing Métro
Brice Dulin	Fullback	13 April 1990 (aged 24)	18	(France) Racing Métro
Scott Spedding	Fullback	4 May 1986 (aged 28)	3	(France) Bayonne

=== Call-ups ===
On 19 January, Saint-André added Wenceslas Lauret to the squad to replace the injured Charles Ollivon.

On 21 January, Loann Goujon is brought in to the squad to cover for Louis Picamoles.

On 25 January, Morgan Parra was brought in to the squad to cover the injured Brice Dulin.

On 1 February, Gaël Fickou was added to the squad as injury cover for the injured Alexandre Dumoulin.

On 8 February, Vincent Debaty and Jocelino Suta were added to the squad for the Ireland game, as injury cover for Alexandre Menini and Alexandre Flanquart respectively.

On 19 February, Pierre Bernard was added to the squad.

On 21 February, Jules Plisson was added to the squad to replace the newly added Pierre Bernard, who was ruled out due to injury.

On 5 March, Maxime Mermoz was called up to the squad in replacement for Wesley Fofana for the final two rounds of the tournament.

On 10 March, Marc Andreu was called up to the squad to replace Sofiane Guitoune who was ruled out of Round 4 due to injury.

On 17 March, Thomas Domingo was called up to the squad to replace Eddy Ben Arous who was ruled out of the final week due to injury.

Note: Flags indicate national union for the club/province as defined by World Rugby.

Player	Position	Date of birth (age)	Caps	Club/province
Vincent Debaty	Prop	2 October 1981 (aged 33)	25	(France) Clermont
Thomas Domingo	Prop	20 August 1985 (aged 29)	36	(France) Clermont
Jocelino Suta	Lock	18 November 1982 (aged 32)	5	(France) Toulon
Wenceslas Lauret	Flanker	28 March 1989 (aged 25)	7	(France) Racing Métro
Loann Goujon	Number 8	23 April 1989 (aged 25)	0	(France) La Rochelle
Morgan Parra	Scrum-half	15 November 1988 (aged 26)	56	(France) Clermont
Pierre Bernard	Fly-half	31 January 1989 (aged 26)	0	(France) Bordeaux Bègles
Jules Plisson	Fly-half	20 August 1986 (aged 28)	4	(France) Stade Français
Gaël Fickou	Centre	26 March 1994 (aged 20)	9	(France) Toulouse
Maxime Mermoz	Centre	28 July 1986 (aged 28)	28	(France) Toulon
Marc Andreu	Wing	27 December 1985 (aged 29)	7	(France) Racing Métro

== Ireland ==
On 1 February, following the Ireland Wolfhounds match, Ireland reduced the extended 46-man squad down to a 38-man squad for the 2015 Six Nations Championship.

Head coach: (New Zealand) Joe Schmidt

Note: Flags indicate national union for the club/province as defined by World Rugby.

Player	Position	Date of birth (age)	Caps	Club/province
Rory Best	Hooker	15 August 1982 (aged 32)	78	(Ireland) Ulster
Seán Cronin	Hooker	6 May 1986 (aged 28)	38	(Ireland) Leinster
Richardt Strauss	Hooker	29 January 1986 (aged 29)	6	(Ireland) Leinster
James Cronin	Prop	23 November 1990 (aged 24)	1	(Ireland) Munster
Cian Healy	Prop	7 October 1987 (aged 27)	47	(Ireland) Leinster
Jack McGrath	Prop	11 October 1989 (aged 25)	12	(Ireland) Leinster
Martin Moore	Prop	1 March 1991 (aged 23)	5	(Ireland) Leinster
Mike Ross	Prop	21 December 1979 (aged 35)	44	(Ireland) Leinster
Nathan White	Prop	4 September 1981 (aged 33)	0	(Ireland) Connacht
Iain Henderson	Lock	21 February 1992 (aged 22)	12	(Ireland) Ulster
Mike McCarthy	Lock	27 November 1981 (aged 33)	17	(Ireland) Leinster
Paul O'Connell (c)	Lock	20 October 1979 (aged 35)	96	(Ireland) Munster
Devin Toner	Lock	29 June 1986 (aged 28)	20	(Ireland) Leinster
Jordi Murphy	Flanker	22 April 1991 (aged 23)	4	(Ireland) Leinster
Seán O'Brien	Flanker	14 February 1987 (aged 27)	30	(Ireland) Leinster
Tommy O'Donnell	Flanker	21 May 1987 (aged 27)	6	(Ireland) Munster
Peter O'Mahony	Flanker	17 September 1989 (aged 25)	25	(Ireland) Munster
Dominic Ryan	Flanker	28 March 1990 (aged 24)	1	(Ireland) Leinster
Robbie Diack	Number 8	12 November 1985 (aged 29)	2	(Ireland) Ulster
Jamie Heaslip	Number 8	15 December 1983 (aged 31)	69	(Ireland) Leinster
Isaac Boss	Scrum-half	9 April 1980 (aged 34)	20	(Ireland) Leinster
Kieran Marmion	Scrum-half	11 February 1992 (aged 22)	3	(Ireland) Connacht
Conor Murray	Scrum-half	20 April 1989 (aged 25)	30	(Ireland) Munster
Eoin Reddan	Scrum-half	20 November 1980 (aged 34)	58	(Ireland) Leinster
Ian Keatley	Fly-half	1 April 1987 (aged 27)	3	(Ireland) Munster
Ian Madigan	Fly-half	21 March 1989 (aged 25)	13	(Ireland) Leinster
Johnny Sexton	Fly-half	11 July 1985 (aged 29)	47	(France) Racing Métro
Darren Cave	Centre	5 April 1987 (aged 27)	8	(Ireland) Ulster
Gordon D'Arcy	Centre	10 February 1980 (aged 34)	81	(Ireland) Leinster
Robbie Henshaw	Centre	12 June 1993 (aged 21)	5	(Ireland) Connacht
Jared Payne	Centre	13 October 1985 (aged 29)	1	(Ireland) Ulster
Tommy Bowe	Wing	22 February 1984 (aged 30)	56	(Ireland) Ulster
Keith Earls	Wing	2 October 1987 (aged 27)	39	(Ireland) Munster
Luke Fitzgerald	Wing	13 September 1987 (aged 27)	27	(Ireland) Leinster
David Kearney	Wing	19 June 1989 (aged 25)	7	(Ireland) Leinster
Simon Zebo	Wing	16 March 1990 (aged 24)	11	(Ireland) Munster
Felix Jones	Fullback	5 August 1987 (aged 27)	9	(Ireland) Munster
Rob Kearney	Fullback	26 March 1986 (aged 28)	57	(Ireland) Leinster

=== Call-ups ===
On 24 February, Billy Holland and Roger Wilson were added to the squad as injury cover for Jamie Heaslip.

On 9 March, Michael Bent, Tadhg Furlong and Dan Tuohy were added to the squad for the final two matches against Wales and Scotland.

Note: Flags indicate national union for the club/province as defined by World Rugby.

Player	Position	Date of birth (age)	Caps	Club/province
Michael Bent	Prop	25 April 1986 (aged 28)	2	(Ireland) Leinster
Tadhg Furlong	Prop	14 November 1992 (aged 22)	0	(Ireland) Leinster
Dan Tuohy	Lock	18 June 1985 (aged 29)	9	(Ireland) Ulster
Billy Holland	Flanker	3 August 1985 (aged 29)	0	(Ireland) Munster
Roger Wilson	Number 8	21 September 1981 (aged 33)	1	(Ireland) Ulster

== Italy ==
On 15 January, Italy named a 31-man squad for the 2015 Six Nations Championship, featuring 4 uncapped players.

Head coach: (France) Jacques Brunel

Note: Flags indicate national union for the club/province as defined by World Rugby.

Player	Position	Date of birth (age)	Caps	Club/province
Leonardo Ghiraldini	Hooker	26 December 1984 (age 41)	70	(England) Leicester Tigers
Andrea Manici	Hooker	28 April 1990 (aged 24)	6	(Italy) Zebre
Matías Agüero	Prop	13 February 1981 (aged 33)	29	(Italy) Zebre
Martin Castrogiovanni	Prop	21 October 1981 (aged 33)	107	(France) Toulon
Dario Chistolini	Prop	14 September 1988 (aged 26)	5	(Italy) Zebre
Alberto De Marchi	Prop	13 March 1986 (aged 28)	23	(England) Sale Sharks
George Biagi	Lock	4 October 1985 (aged 29)	3	(Italy) Zebre
Marco Bortolami	Lock	12 June 1980 (aged 34)	110	(Italy) Zebre
Joshua Furno	Lock	21 October 1989 (aged 25)	24	(England) Newcastle Falcons
Quintin Geldenhuys	Lock	19 June 1981 (aged 33)	52	(Italy) Zebre
Robert Barbieri	Flanker	5 June 1984 (aged 30)	38	(England) Leicester Tigers
Mauro Bergamasco	Flanker	1 May 1979 (aged 35)	100	(Italy) Zebre
Simone Favaro	Flanker	7 November 1988 (aged 26)	23	(Italy) Benetton Treviso
Francesco Minto	Flanker	20 May 1987 (aged 27)	11	(Italy) Benetton Treviso
Alessandro Zanni	Flanker	31 January 1984 (aged 31)	86	(Italy) Benetton Treviso
Sergio Parisse (c)	Number 8	12 September 1983 (aged 31)	108	(France) Stade Français
Edoardo Gori	Scrum-half	5 March 1990 (aged 24)	37	(Italy) Benetton Treviso
Guglielmo Palazzani	Scrum-half	11 April 1991 (aged 23)	5	(Italy) Zebre
Marcello Violi	Scrum-half	11 October 1993 (aged 21)	0	(Italy) Calvisano
Tommaso Allan	Fly-half	26 April 1993 (aged 21)	10	(France) Perpignan
Kelly Haimona	Fly-half	30 July 1986 (aged 28)	3	(Italy) Zebre
Giulio Bisegni	Centre	4 April 1992 (aged 22)	0	(Italy) Zebre
Michele Campagnaro	Centre	13 March 1993 (aged 21)	12	(Italy) Benetton Treviso
Luca Morisi	Centre	22 February 1991 (aged 23)	9	(Italy) Benetton Treviso
Simone Ragusi	Wing	28 March 1992 (aged 22)	0	(Italy) Benetton Treviso
Leonardo Sarto	Wing	15 January 1992 (aged 23)	12	(Italy) Zebre
Giovanbattista Venditti	Wing	27 March 1990 (aged 24)	22	(Italy) Zebre
Michele Visentin	Wing	13 December 1991 (aged 23)	0	(Italy) Zebre
Andrea Masi	Fullback	30 March 1981 (aged 33)	87	(England) Wasps
Luke McLean	Fullback	29 June 1987 (aged 27)	63	(England) Sale Sharks

=== Call-ups ===
On 25 January, Marco Barbini was added to the squad to further selection options in the back row.

On 29 January, Marco Fuser was added to the squad as cover for the injured Quintin Geldenhuys.

On 8 February, Tommaso Boni and Samuela Vunisa were added to the squad as injury cover for Michele Campagnaro and Alessandro Zanni.

On 22 February, Lorenzo Cittadini, was added as injury cover for Martin Castrogiovanni, while Enrico Bacchin and Antonio Pavanello were added to the squad after strong performances for Treviso in the first week off.

On 12 March, Luciano Orquera was added to the squad as injury cover for Kelly Haimona.

On 16 March, Michele Rizzo was added to the squad to replace Matías Agüero who was ruled out of the final match due to injury.

Note: Flags indicate national union for the club/province as defined by World Rugby.

Player	Position	Date of birth (age)	Caps	Club/province
Lorenzo Cittadini	Prop	17 December 1982 (aged 32)	36	(England) Wasps
Michele Rizzo	Prop	16 September 1982 (aged 32)	15	(England) Leicester Tigers
Marco Fuser	Lock	9 March 1991 (aged 23)	2	(Italy) Benetton Treviso
Antonio Pavanello	Lock	13 October 1982 (aged 32)	23	(Italy) Benetton Treviso
Marco Barbini	Flanker	16 October 1990 (aged 24)	0	(Italy) Benetton Treviso
Samuela Vunisa	Flanker	19 August 1988 (aged 26)	1	(Italy) Zebre
Luciano Orquera	Fly-half	12 October 1981 (aged 33)	46	(Italy) Zebre
Enrico Bacchin	Centre	28 November 1992 (aged 22)	0	(Italy) Benetton Treviso
Tommaso Boni	Centre	15 January 1993 (aged 22)	0	(Italy) Mogliano

== Scotland ==
On 20 January, Scotland announced a 32-man squad for the 2015 Six Nations Championship, including four uncapped players, one of whom is the Scottish-qualified Australian-born Ben Toolis.

Head coach: (New Zealand) Vern Cotter

Note: Flags indicate national union for the club/province as defined by World Rugby.

Player	Position	Date of birth (age)	Caps	Club/province
Fraser Brown	Hooker	20 June 1989 (aged 25)	3	(Scotland) Glasgow Warriors
Ross Ford	Hooker	23 April 1984 (aged 30)	80	(Scotland) Edinburgh
Geoff Cross	Prop	11 December 1982 (aged 32)	35	(England) London Irish
Alasdair Dickinson	Prop	11 September 1983 (aged 31)	39	(Scotland) Edinburgh
Euan Murray	Prop	7 August 1980 (aged 34)	62	(Scotland) Glasgow Warriors
Gordon Reid	Prop	4 March 1987 (aged 27)	6	(Scotland) Glasgow Warriors
Jon Welsh	Prop	13 October 1986 (aged 28)	3	(Scotland) Glasgow Warriors
Jonny Gray	Lock	14 March 1994 (aged 20)	8	(Scotland) Glasgow Warriors
Richie Gray	Lock	24 August 1989 (aged 25)	42	(France) Castres
Jim Hamilton	Lock	17 November 1982 (aged 32)	57	(England) Saracens
Ben Toolis	Lock	31 March 1992 (aged 22)	0	(Scotland) Edinburgh
Hugh Blake	Flanker	10 September 1992 (aged 22)	0	(Scotland) Edinburgh
Blair Cowan	Flanker	21 April 1986 (aged 28)	6	(England) London Irish
Rob Harley	Flanker	26 May 1990 (aged 24)	10	(Scotland) Glasgow Warriors
Alasdair Strokosch	Flanker	21 February 1983 (aged 31)	42	(France) Perpignan
Hamish Watson	Flanker	15 October 1991 (aged 23)	0	(Scotland) Edinburgh
David Denton	Number 8	5 February 1990 (aged 25)	23	(Scotland) Edinburgh
Sam Hidalgo-Clyne	Scrum-half	4 August 1993 (aged 21)	0	(Scotland) Edinburgh
Greig Laidlaw (c)	Scrum-half	12 October 1985 (aged 29)	34	(England) Gloucester
Henry Pyrgos	Scrum-half	9 July 1989 (aged 25)	13	(Scotland) Glasgow Warriors
Finn Russell	Fly-half	23 September 1992 (aged 22)	5	(Scotland) Glasgow Warriors
Greig Tonks	Fly-half	20 May 1989 (aged 25)	1	(Scotland) Edinburgh
Mark Bennett	Centre	3 March 1993 (aged 21)	2	(Scotland) Glasgow Warriors
Alex Dunbar	Centre	23 April 1990 (aged 24)	11	(Scotland) Glasgow Warriors
Peter Horne	Centre	5 October 1989 (aged 25)	5	(Scotland) Glasgow Warriors
Sean Lamont	Centre	15 January 1981 (aged 34)	91	(Scotland) Glasgow Warriors
Matt Scott	Centre	30 September 1990 (aged 24)	21	(Scotland) Edinburgh
Dougie Fife	Wing	8 August 1990 (aged 24)	3	(Scotland) Edinburgh
Sean Maitland	Wing	14 September 1988 (aged 26)	15	(Scotland) Glasgow Warriors
Tommy Seymour	Wing	1 July 1988 (aged 26)	13	(Scotland) Glasgow Warriors
Tim Visser	Wing	29 May 1987 (aged 27)	15	(Scotland) Edinburgh
Stuart Hogg	Fullback	24 June 1992 (aged 22)	27	(Scotland) Glasgow Warriors

=== Call-ups ===
On 26 January, Johnnie Beattie was added to the squad as injury cover for Dave Denton.

On 1 February, Ryan Grant was recalled to the squad following his disciplinary hearings.

On 17 February, Tim Swinson was called up to the squad to replace Richie Gray who was ruled out of the tournament after an injury sustained in round 2.

On 23 February, Alex Allan, Adam Ashe, Chris Cusiter and Moray Low were added to the squad, with Allan and Low replacing Gordon Reid and Jon Welsh due to injury.

On 9 March, Stuart McInally was added to the squad as precautionary injury cover for Ross Ford.

Note: Flags indicate national union for the club/province as defined by World Rugby.

Player	Position	Date of birth (age)	Caps	Club/province
Stuart McInally	Hooker	9 August 1990 (aged 24)	0	(Scotland) Edinburgh
Alex Allan	Prop	28 February 1992 (aged 22)	1	(Scotland) Glasgow Warriors
Ryan Grant	Prop	8 October 1985 (aged 29)	19	(Scotland) Glasgow Warriors
Moray Low	Prop	28 November 1984 (aged 30)	29	(England) Exeter Chiefs
Tim Swinson	Lock	17 February 1987 (aged 27)	9	(Scotland) Glasgow Warriors
Adam Ashe	Number 8	24 July 1993 (aged 21)	3	(Scotland) Glasgow Warriors
Johnnie Beattie	Number 8	21 November 1985 (aged 29)	34	(France) Castres
Chris Cusiter	Scrum-half	13 June 1982 (aged 32)	70	(England) Sale Sharks

== Wales ==
On 20 January, Wales named a 34-man squad for the 2015 Six Nations Championship, including four uncapped players, one of whom was the Welsh-qualified New Zealand-born Gareth Anscombe.

Head coach: (New Zealand) Warren Gatland

Note: Flags indicate national union for the club/province as defined by World Rugby.

Player	Position	Date of birth (age)	Caps	Club/province
Scott Baldwin	Hooker	12 July 1988 (aged 26)	5	(Wales) Ospreys
Kristian Dacey	Hooker	25 July 1989 (aged 25)	0	(Wales) Cardiff Blues
Richard Hibbard	Hooker	13 December 1983 (aged 31)	33	(England) Gloucester
Scott Andrews	Prop	1 August 1989 (aged 25)	9	(Wales) Cardiff Blues
Rob Evans	Prop	14 April 1992 (aged 22)	0	(Wales) Scarlets
Paul James	Prop	13 May 1982 (aged 32)	57	(England) Bath
Aaron Jarvis	Prop	20 May 1986 (aged 28)	5	(Wales) Ospreys
Gethin Jenkins	Prop	17 November 1980 (aged 34)	110	(Wales) Cardiff Blues
Samson Lee	Prop	30 November 1992 (aged 22)	9	(Wales) Scarlets
Jake Ball	Lock	21 June 1991 (aged 23)	8	(Wales) Scarlets
Luke Charteris	Lock	9 March 1983 (aged 31)	50	(France) Racing Métro
Bradley Davies	Lock	9 January 1987 (aged 28)	44	(England) Wasps
Alun Wyn Jones	Lock	19 September 1985 (aged 29)	84	(Wales) Ospreys
James King	Flanker	24 July 1990 (aged 24)	3	(Wales) Ospreys
Dan Lydiate	Flanker	18 December 1987 (aged 27)	41	(Wales) Ospreys
Justin Tipuric	Flanker	6 August 1989 (aged 25)	27	(Wales) Ospreys
Sam Warburton (c)	Flanker	5 December 1988 (aged 26)	49	(Wales) Cardiff Blues
Taulupe Faletau	Number 8	12 November 1990 (aged 24)	40	(Wales) Newport Gwent Dragons
Gareth Davies	Scrum-half	18 August 1990 (aged 24)	1	(Wales) Scarlets
Mike Phillips	Scrum-half	29 August 1982 (aged 32)	90	(France) Racing Métro
Rhys Webb	Scrum-half	9 December 1988 (aged 26)	9	(Wales) Ospreys
Gareth Anscombe	Fly-half	10 May 1991 (aged 23)	0	(Wales) Cardiff Blues
Dan Biggar	Fly-half	16 October 1989 (aged 25)	28	(Wales) Ospreys
Rhys Priestland	Fly-half	9 January 1987 (aged 28)	32	(Wales) Scarlets
Cory Allen	Centre	11 February 1993 (aged 21)	2	(Wales) Cardiff Blues
Jonathan Davies	Centre	5 April 1988 (aged 26)	43	(France) Clermont
Tyler Morgan	Centre	11 September 1995 (aged 19)	0	(Wales) Newport Gwent Dragons
Jamie Roberts	Centre	8 November 1986 (aged 28)	64	(France) Racing Métro
Scott Williams	Centre	10 October 1990 (aged 24)	27	(Wales) Scarlets
Hallam Amos	Wing	24 September 1994 (aged 20)	1	(Wales) Newport Gwent Dragons
Alex Cuthbert	Wing	5 April 1990 (aged 24)	30	(Wales) Cardiff Blues
George North	Wing	13 April 1992 (aged 22)	45	(England) Northampton Saints
Leigh Halfpenny	Fullback	22 December 1988 (aged 26)	55	(France) Toulon
Liam Williams	Fullback	9 April 1991 (aged 23)	18	(Wales) Scarlets

=== Call-ups ===
On 9 March, Ken Owens was added to the squad after recovering from a neck injury in 2014, while prop Tomas Francis (Exeter Chiefs) was invited to train with the squad following injury to Paul James.

On 16 March, Tomas Francis was promoted to the main team for the final week of the tournament, following injury to Samson Lee. While Rhys Gill was invited to train with the squad following injury to Gethin Jenkins.

Note: Flags indicate national union for the club/province as defined by World Rugby.

Player	Position	Date of birth (age)	Caps	Club/province
Ken Owens	Hooker	3 January 1987 (aged 28)	26	(Wales) Scarlets
Tomas Francis	Prop	27 April 1992 (aged 22)	0	(England) Exeter Chiefs
Rhys Gill	Prop	30 October 1986 (aged 28)	5	(England) Saracens
