= 2016 Six Nations Championship squads =

Rugby union competition squads

This is a list of the complete squads for the 2016 Six Nations Championship, an annual rugby union tournament contested by the national rugby teams of England, France, Ireland, Italy, Scotland and Wales. Ireland are the defending champions.

Note: Number of caps and players' ages are indicated as of 6 February 2016 – the tournament's opening day.

== England ==
On 13 January, Eddie Jones named a 33-man squad for the 2016 Six Nations Championship.

Head coach: (Australia) Eddie Jones

Player	Position	Date of birth (age)	Caps	Club/province
Luke Cowan-Dickie	Hooker	20 June 1993 (aged 22)	1	Exeter Chiefs
Jamie George	Hooker	22 October 1990 (aged 25)	3	Saracens
Dylan Hartley (c)	Hooker	24 March 1986 (aged 29)	66	Northampton Saints
Dan Cole	Prop	9 May 1987 (aged 28)	56	Leicester Tigers
Paul Hill	Prop	2 March 1995 (aged 20)	0	Northampton Saints
Joe Marler	Prop	7 July 1990 (aged 25)	37	Harlequins
Matt Mullan	Prop	23 February 1987 (aged 28)	9	Wasps
Henry Thomas	Prop	30 October 1991 (aged 24)	7	Bath
Mako Vunipola	Prop	13 January 1991 (aged 25)	27	Saracens
Maro Itoje	Lock	28 October 1994 (aged 21)	0	Saracens
George Kruis	Lock	22 February 1990 (aged 25)	10	Saracens
Joe Launchbury	Lock	12 April 1991 (aged 24)	28	Wasps
Courtney Lawes	Lock	23 February 1989 (aged 26)	42	Northampton Saints
Jack Clifford (rugby)	Flanker	12 February 1993 (aged 22)	0	Harlequins
James Haskell	Flanker	2 April 1985 (aged 30)	62	Wasps
Matt Kvesic	Flanker	14 April 1992 (aged 23)	2	Gloucester
Chris Robshaw	Flanker	4 June 1986 (aged 29)	43	Harlequins
Josh Beaumont	Number 8	24 March 1992 (aged 23)	0	Sale Sharks
Billy Vunipola	Number 8	3 November 1992 (aged 23)	21	Saracens
Danny Care	Scrum-half	2 January 1987 (aged 29)	53	Harlequins
Ben Youngs	Scrum-half	5 September 1989 (aged 26)	52	Leicester Tigers
Owen Farrell	Fly-half	24 September 1991 (aged 24)	35	Saracens
George Ford	Fly-half	16 March 1993 (aged 22)	17	Bath
Elliot Daly	Centre	8 October 1992 (aged 23)	0	Wasps
Ollie Devoto	Centre	22 September 1993 (aged 22)	0	Bath
Sam Hill	Centre	14 July 1993 (aged 22)	0	Exeter Chiefs
Jonathan Joseph	Centre	21 May 1991 (aged 24)	16	Bath
Chris Ashton	Wing	29 March 1987 (aged 28)	39	Saracens
Jack Nowell	Wing	11 April 1993 (aged 22)	10	Exeter Chiefs
Anthony Watson	Wing	26 February 1994 (aged 21)	15	Bath
Marland Yarde	Wing	20 April 1992 (aged 23)	7	Harlequins
Mike Brown	Fullback	4 September 1985 (aged 30)	43	Harlequins
Alex Goode	Fullback	7 May 1988 (aged 27)	19	Saracens

=== Call-ups ===
On 24 January, Semesa Rokoduguni was called up as cover for Chris Ashton, who had been given a 10-week ban.

On 1 February, Kieran Brookes replaced Henry Thomas, who had been covering Brookes in the initial squad, after recovering from a pre-squad announcement injury.

On 22 February, Luther Burrell was added to the squad as an injury replacement for Ollie Devoto.

On 29 February, Dave Ewers and Manu Tuilagi were called up to the squad ahead of the final two rounds of the Championship.

On 6 March, Ed Slater was called up to the squad as injury cover for Courtney Lawes.

Player	Position	Date of birth (age)	Caps	Club/province
Kieran Brookes	Prop	29 August 1990 (aged 25)	15	Northampton Saints
Ed Slater	Lock	1 August 1988 (aged 27)	0	Leicester Tigers
Dave Ewers	Number 8	3 November 1990 (aged 25)	0	Exeter Chiefs
Luther Burrell	Centre	6 December 1987 (aged 28)	13	Northampton Saints
Manu Tuilagi	Centre	18 May 1991 (aged 24)	25	Leicester Tigers
Semesa Rokoduguni	Wing	28 August 1987 (aged 28)	1	Bath

== France ==
On 19 January, head coach Guy Novès named a 31-man squad for the 2016 Six Nations Championship.

Head coach: (France) Guy Novès

Player	Position	Date of birth (age)	Caps	Club/province
Camille Chat	Hooker	December 18, 1995 (aged 20)	0	Racing 92
Guilhem Guirado (c)	Hooker	June 17, 1986 (aged 29)	38	Toulon
Uini Atonio	Prop	March 26, 1990 (aged 25)	10	La Rochelle
Eddy Ben Arous	Prop	August 25, 1990 (aged 25)	12	Racing 92
Jefferson Poirot	Prop	November 1, 1992 (aged 23)	0	Bordeaux Bègles
Rabah Slimani	Prop	October 18, 1989 (aged 26)	21	Stade Français
Alexandre Flanquart	Lock	October 9, 1989 (aged 26)	18	Stade Français
Paul Jedrasiak	Lock	February 17, 1993 (aged 22)	0	Clermont
Yoann Maestri	Lock	January 14, 1988 (aged 28)	42	Toulouse
Sébastien Vahaamahina	Lock	October 21, 1991 (aged 24)	17	Clermont
Antoine Burban	Flanker	July 22, 1987 (aged 28)	3	Stade Français
Yacouba Camara	Flanker	June 2, 1994 (aged 21)	0	Toulouse
Kevin Gourdon	Flanker	January 23, 1990 (aged 26)	0	La Rochelle
Wenceslas Lauret	Flanker	March 28, 1989 (aged 26)	7	Racing 92
Damien Chouly	Number 8	November 27, 1985 (aged 30)	36	Clermont
Louis Picamoles	Number 8	February 5, 1986 (aged 30)	51	Toulouse
Sébastien Bezy	Scrum-half	November 22, 1991 (aged 24)	0	Toulouse
Maxime Machenaud	Scrum-half	December 30, 1988 (aged 27)	18	Racing 92
Morgan Parra	Scrum-half	November 15, 1988 (aged 27)	66	Clermont
Jean-Marc Doussain	Fly-half	February 12, 1991 (aged 24)	10	Toulouse
Jules Plisson	Fly-half	August 20, 1991 (aged 24)	6	Stade Français
Jonathan Danty	Centre	October 7, 1992 (aged 23)	0	Stade Français
Alexandre Dumoulin	Centre	August 24, 1989 (aged 26)	8	Racing 92
Gaël Fickou	Centre	March 26, 1994 (aged 21)	15	Toulouse
Rémi Lamerat	Centre	January 14, 1990 (aged 26)	7	Castres
Wesley Fofana	Centre	January 20, 1988 (aged 28)	39	Clermont
Benjamin Fall	Wing	March 3, 1989 (aged 26)	6	Montpellier
Maxime Médard	Wing	November 16, 1986 (aged 29)	41	Toulouse
Virimi Vakatawa	Wing	May 1, 1992 (aged 23)	0	France Sevens
Hugo Bonneval	Fullback	November 19, 1990 (aged 25)	4	Stade Français
Scott Spedding	Fullback	May 4, 1986 (aged 29)	14	Clermont

=== Call-ups ===
On 24 January, Marvin O'Connor was called up to the squad as injury cover for Benjamin Fall.

On 25 January, Baptiste Serin and Bernard Le Roux were added to the squad as injury cover for Morgan Parra and Sébastien Vahaamahina.

On 28 January, Vincent Pelo and Maxime Mermoz were added to the squad, with Mermoz acting as injury cover for Alexandre Dumoulin.

On 31 January, Wesley Fofana was ruled out of France's opening test against Italy due to injury, with Teddy Thomas being called up as cover.

On 7 February, Loann Goujon replaced Louis Picamoles haven suffered an injury in France's opening match against Italy.

On 21 February, Djibril Camara, David Smith and François Trinh-Duc were called up to the squad as injury cover for Teddy Thomas and Marvin O'Connor. However, later that day Smith was made ineligible to play for France haven played for the New Zealand sevens team.

On 3 March, Xavier Chiocci was called up to the squad ahead of the Scotland game in round 4.

Player	Position	Date of birth (age)	Caps	Club/province
Xavier Chiocci	Prop	February 13, 1990 (aged 25)	4	Toulon
Vincent Pelo	Prop	April 22, 1988 (aged 27)	0	La Rochelle
Bernard Le Roux	Flanker	June 4, 1989 (aged 26)	23	Racing 92
Loann Goujon	Number 8	April 23, 1989 (aged 26)	6	Bordeaux Bègles
Baptiste Serin	Scrum-half	June 20, 1994 (aged 21)	0	Bordeaux Bègles
François Trinh-Duc	Fly-half	November 11, 1986 (aged 29)	50	Montpellier
Maxime Mermoz	Centre	July 28, 1986 (aged 29)	30	Toulon
Djibril Camara	Wing	June 22, 1989 (aged 26)	0	Stade Français
Marvin O'Connor	Wing	April 18, 1991 (aged 24)	0	Montpellier
Teddy Thomas	Wing	April 18, 1991 (aged 24)	4	Racing 92

== Ireland ==
On 20 January, Joe Schmidt announced his 35-man squad for Ireland.

Head Coach: (New Zealand) Joe Schmidt

Player	Position	Date of birth (age)	Caps	Club/province
Rory Best (c)	Hooker	15 August 1982 (aged 33)	89	(Ireland) Ulster
Seán Cronin	Hooker	6 May 1986 (aged 29)	48	(Ireland) Leinster
Rob Herring	Hooker	27 April 1990 (aged 25)	1	(Ireland) Ulster
Richardt Strauss	Hooker	29 January 1986 (aged 30)	13	(Ireland) Leinster
James Cronin	Prop	23 November 1990 (aged 25)	2	(Ireland) Munster
Tadhg Furlong	Prop	14 November 1992 (aged 23)	3	(Ireland) Leinster
Jack McGrath	Prop	11 October 1989 (aged 26)	25	(Ireland) Leinster
Marty Moore	Prop	1 March 1991 (aged 24)	10	(Ireland) Leinster
Nathan White	Prop	4 September 1981 (aged 34)	8	(Ireland) Connacht
Ultan Dillane	Lock	9 November 1993 (aged 22)	0	(Ireland) Connacht
Mike McCarthy	Lock	27 November 1981 (aged 34)	17	(Ireland) Leinster
Donnacha Ryan	Lock	11 December 1983 (aged 32)	34	(Ireland) Munster
Devin Toner	Lock	29 June 1986 (aged 29)	31	(Ireland) Leinster
Seán O'Brien	Flanker	14 February 1987 (aged 28)	41	(Ireland) Leinster
Tommy O'Donnell	Flanker	21 May 1987 (aged 28)	9	(Ireland) Munster
Rhys Ruddock	Flanker	13 November 1990 (aged 25)	6	(Ireland) Leinster
Josh van der Flier	Flanker	25 April 1993 (aged 22)	0	(Ireland) Leinster
Jamie Heaslip	Number 8	15 December 1983 (aged 32)	80	(Ireland) Leinster
CJ Stander	Number 8	5 April 1990 (aged 25)	0	(Ireland) Munster
Kieran Marmion	Scrum-half	11 February 1992 (aged 23)	4	(Ireland) Connacht
Conor Murray	Scrum-half	20 April 1989 (aged 26)	42	(Ireland) Munster
Eoin Reddan	Scrum-half	20 November 1980 (aged 35)	68	(Ireland) Leinster
Paddy Jackson	Fly-half	5 January 1992 (aged 24)	13	(Ireland) Ulster
Ian Madigan	Fly-half	21 March 1989 (aged 26)	25	(Ireland) Leinster
Johnny Sexton	Fly-half	11 July 1985 (aged 30)	56	(Ireland) Leinster
Robbie Henshaw	Centre	12 June 1993 (aged 22)	15	(Ireland) Connacht
Luke Marshall	Centre	3 March 1991 (aged 24)	6	(Ireland) Ulster
Stuart McCloskey	Centre	6 August 1992 (aged 23)	0	(Ireland) Ulster
Jared Payne	Centre	13 October 1985 (aged 30)	10	(Ireland) Ulster
Keith Earls	Wing	2 October 1987 (aged 28)	46	(Ireland) Munster
Luke Fitzgerald	Wing	13 September 1987 (aged 28)	34	(Ireland) Leinster
Dave Kearney	Wing	19 June 1989 (aged 26)	14	(Ireland) Leinster
Andrew Trimble	Wing	20 October 1984 (aged 31)	58	(Ireland) Ulster
Simon Zebo	Wing	16 March 1990 (aged 25)	21	(Ireland) Munster
Rob Kearney	Fullback	26 March 1986 (aged 29)	67	(Ireland) Leinster

=== Call-ups ===
On 25 January, Finlay Bealham joined the squad as an injury replacement for Martin Moore who suffered a ham-string injury.

On 9 February, Fergus McFadden was called up as injury cover for Keith Earls who sustained an injury in the opening round of the championship.

On 22 February, Dave Foley, Craig Gilroy and Jordi Murphy were called up as injury replacements for Dave Kearney, Mike McCarthy and Seán O'Brien. While Cian Healy and Mike Ross were called up to the squad haven recovered from injury.

On 7 March, Jack O'Donoghue was called up for the final two rounds.

Player	Position	Date of birth (age)	Caps	Club/province
Finlay Bealham	Prop	9 October 1991 (aged 24)	0	(Ireland) Connacht
Cian Healy	Prop	7 October 1987 (aged 28)	56	(Ireland) Leinster
Mike Ross	Prop	21 December 1979 (aged 36)	56	(Ireland) Leinster
Dave Foley	Lock	16 May 1988 (aged 27)	2	(Ireland) Munster
Jordi Murphy	Flanker	22 April 1991 (aged 24)	14	(Ireland) Leinster
Jack O'Donoghue	Flanker	8 January 1994 (aged 22)	0	(Ireland) Munster
Craig Gilroy	Wing	11 March 1991 (aged 24)	6	(Ireland) Ulster
Fergus McFadden	Wing	17 June 1986 (aged 29)	29	(Ireland) Leinster

== Italy ==
On 20 January, Brunel named a 30-man squad for the 2016 Six Nations Championship.

Head coach: (France) Jacques Brunel

Note: Flags indicate national union for the club/province as defined by World Rugby.

Player	Position	Date of birth (age)	Caps	Club/province
Ornel Gega	Hooker	24 March 1990 (aged 25)	0	(Italy) Benetton Treviso
Leonardo Ghiraldini	Hooker	26 December 1984 (aged 31)	80	(England) Leicester Tigers
Martin Castrogiovanni	Prop	21 October 1981 (aged 34)	115	(France) Racing 92
Dario Chistolini	Prop	14 September 1988 (aged 27)	13	(Italy) Zebre
Lorenzo Cittadini	Prop	17 December 1982 (aged 33)	44	(England) Wasps
Andrea Lovotti	Prop	28 July 1989 (aged 26)	0	(Italy) Zebre
Matteo Zanusso	Prop	9 April 1993 (aged 22)	0	(Italy) Benetton Treviso
Valerio Bernabò	Lock	3 March 1984 (aged 31)	27	(Italy) Zebre
George Biagi	Lock	4 October 1985 (aged 30)	8	(Italy) Zebre
Marco Fuser	Lock	9 March 1991 (aged 24)	6	(Italy) Benetton Treviso
Francesco Minto	Flanker	20 May 1987 (aged 28)	23	(Italy) Benetton Treviso
Jacopo Sarto	Flanker	15 July 1990 (aged 25)	0	(Italy) Zebre
Braam Steyn	Flanker	2 May 1992 (aged 23)	0	(Italy) Benetton Treviso
Alessandro Zanni	Flanker	31 January 1984 (aged 32)	94	(Italy) Benetton Treviso
Sergio Parisse (c)	Number 8	12 September 1983 (aged 32)	114	(France) Stade Français
Dries van Schalkwyk	Number 8	21 December 1984 (aged 31)	0	(Italy) Zebre
Edoardo Gori	Scrum-half	5 March 1990 (aged 25)	47	(Italy) Benetton Treviso
Guglielmo Palazzani	Scrum-half	11 April 1991 (aged 24)	15	(Italy) Zebre
Carlo Canna	Fly-half	25 August 1992 (aged 23)	7	(Italy) Zebre
Edoardo Padovani	Fly-half	15 May 1993 (aged 22)	0	(Italy) Zebre
Giulio Bisegni	Centre	4 April 1992 (aged 23)	2	(Italy) Zebre
Michele Campagnaro	Centre	13 March 1993 (aged 22)	18	(England) Exeter Chiefs
Tommaso Castello	Centre	14 August 1991 (aged 24)	0	(Italy) Calvisano
Gonzalo García	Centre	18 February 1984 (aged 31)	39	(Italy) Zebre
Kelly Haimona	Centre	30 July 1986 (aged 29)	7	(Italy) Zebre
Andrea Pratichetti	Centre	26 November 1988 (aged 27)	1	(Italy) Benetton Treviso
Mattia Bellini	Wing	8 February 1994 (aged 21)	0	(Italy) Petrarca
David Odiete	Wing	24 February 1993 (aged 22)	0	(Italy) Mogliano
Leonardo Sarto	Wing	15 January 1992 (aged 24)	23	(Italy) Zebre
Luke McLean	Fullback	29 June 1987 (aged 28)	75	(Italy) Benetton Treviso

=== Call-ups ===
On 23 January, Davide Giazzon was a late addition to the original 30-man squad.

On 8 February, Robert Barbieri and Andrea Buondonno were called up to the squad as injury cover for David Odiete and Jacopo Sarto.

On 21 February, Joshua Furno and Luca Morisi were called up to the squad, with Furno joining the squad as injury cover for George Biagi.

On 3 March, Quintin Geldenhuys was drafted into the squad haven recovered from injury pre-championship.

On 6 March, Oliviero Fabiani and Alberto Lucchese added to the squad to face Ireland in Round 4.

On 10 March, Pietro Ceccarelli was named as a travelling replacement, who was later drafted into the match-day squad for Lorenzo Cittadini.

On 17 March, Tommaso Allan returned to the squad haven recovered from injury pre-championship.

Note: Flags indicate national union for the club/province as defined by World Rugby.

Player	Position	Date of birth (age)	Caps	Club/province
Oliviero Fabiani	Hooker	13 July 1990 (aged 25)	0	(Italy) Zebre
Davide Giazzon	Hooker	16 January 1986 (aged 30)	24	(Italy) Benetton Treviso
Pietro Ceccarelli	Prop	16 February 1992 (aged 23)	0	(Italy) Zebre
Joshua Furno	Lock	21 October 1989 (aged 26)	35	(England) Newcastle Falcons
Quintin Geldenhuys	Lock	19 June 1981 (aged 34)	61	(Italy) Zebre
Robert Barbieri	Flanker	5 June 1984 (aged 31)	39	(Italy) Benetton Treviso
Alberto Lucchese	Scrum-half	28 March 1986 (aged 29)	0	(Italy) Zebre
Tommaso Allan	Fly-half	26 April 1993 (aged 22)	21	(France) Perpignan
Luca Morisi	Centre	22 February 1991 (aged 24)	16	(Italy) Benetton Treviso
Andrea Buondonno	Wing		0	(Italy) Mogliano

== Scotland ==
On 19 January, head coach Vern Cotter named a 35-man squad for the 2016 Six Nations Championship. In addition to the 35-man squad, injured players Grant Gilchrist and Henry Pyrgos will train with the squad.

Head Coach: (New Zealand) Vern Cotter

Note: Flags indicate national union for the club/province as defined by World Rugby.

Player	Position	Date of birth (age)	Caps	Club/province
Ross Ford	Hooker	23 April 1984 (aged 31)	94	(Scotland) Edinburgh
Pat MacArthur	Hooker	27 April 1987 (aged 28)	6	(Scotland) Glasgow Warriors
Stuart McInally	Hooker	9 August 1990 (aged 25)	2	(Scotland) Edinburgh
Alasdair Dickinson	Prop	11 September 1983 (aged 32)	52	(Scotland) Edinburgh
Zander Fagerson	Prop	19 January 1996 (aged 20)	0	(Scotland) Glasgow Warriors
Moray Low	Prop	28 November 1984 (aged 31)	29	(England) Exeter Chiefs
WP Nel	Prop	30 April 1986 (aged 29)	8	(Scotland) Edinburgh
Gordon Reid	Prop	4 March 1987 (aged 28)	15	(Scotland) Glasgow Warriors
Rory Sutherland	Prop	24 August 1992 (aged 23)	0	(Scotland) Edinburgh
Jonny Gray	Lock	14 March 1994 (aged 21)	19	(Scotland) Glasgow Warriors
Richie Gray	Lock	24 August 1989 (aged 26)	51	(France) Castres
Tim Swinson	Lock	17 February 1987 (aged 28)	17	(Scotland) Glasgow Warriors
Ben Toolis	Lock	31 March 1992 (aged 23)	1	(Scotland) Edinburgh
John Barclay	Flanker	24 September 1986 (aged 29)	45	(Wales) Scarlets
Blair Cowan	Flanker	21 April 1986 (aged 29)	15	(England) London Irish
Chris Fusaro	Flanker	21 July 1989 (aged 26)	4	(Scotland) Glasgow Warriors
John Hardie	Flanker	27 July 1988 (aged 27)	5	(Scotland) Edinburgh
Josh Strauss	Flanker	23 October 1986 (aged 29)	5	(Scotland) Glasgow Warriors
Adam Ashe	Number 8	24 July 1993 (aged 22)	6	(Scotland) Glasgow Warriors
David Denton	Number 8	5 February 1990 (aged 26)	32	(England) Bath
Sam Hidalgo-Clyne	Scrum-half	4 August 1993 (aged 22)	8	(Scotland) Edinburgh
Greig Laidlaw (c)	Scrum-half	12 October 1985 (aged 30)	46	(England) Gloucester
Finn Russell	Fly-half	23 September 1992 (aged 23)	15	(Scotland) Glasgow Warriors
Duncan Weir	Fly-half	10 May 1991 (aged 24)	21	(Scotland) Glasgow Warriors
Mark Bennett	Centre	3 February 1993 (aged 23)	13	(Scotland) Glasgow Warriors
Alex Dunbar	Centre	23 April 1990 (aged 25)	14	(Scotland) Glasgow Warriors
Peter Horne	Centre	5 October 1989 (aged 26)	15	(Scotland) Glasgow Warriors
Matt Scott	Centre	30 September 1990 (aged 25)	33	(Scotland) Edinburgh
Duncan Taylor	Centre	5 September 1989 (aged 26)	12	(England) Saracens
Sean Lamont	Wing	15 January 1981 (aged 35)	101	(Scotland) Glasgow Warriors
Sean Maitland	Wing	14 September 1988 (aged 27)	20	(England) London Irish
Tommy Seymour	Wing	1 July 1988 (aged 27)	22	(Scotland) Glasgow Warriors
Tim Visser	Wing	29 May 1987 (aged 28)	23	(England) Harlequins
Ruaridh Jackson	Fullback	12 February 1988 (aged 27)	27	(England) Wasps
Stuart Hogg	Fullback	24 June 1992 (age 34)	38	(Scotland) Glasgow Warriors

=== Call-ups ===
On 25 January, Alex Allan and Hamish Watson were late additions to the squad ahead of the championship.

On 22 February, Rob Harley, Grayson Hart, George Turner and Ryan Wilson were called up to the squad as injury cover for Alex Allan, Blair Cowan, Chris Fusaro, Pat MacArthur and Sean Maitland.

On 7 March, Fraser Brown and Henry Pyrgos joined the squad ahead of the French fixture in round 4.

Note: Flags indicate national union for the club/province as defined by World Rugby.

Player	Position	Date of birth (age)	Caps	Club/province
Fraser Brown	Hooker	20 June 1989 (aged 26)	15	(Scotland) Glasgow Warriors
George Turner	Hooker	3 January 1991 (aged 25)	0	(Scotland) Edinburgh
Alex Allan	Prop	28 February 1992 (aged 23)	1	(Scotland) Glasgow Warriors
Rob Harley	Flanker	26 May 1990 (age 36)	17	(Scotland) Glasgow Warriors
Hamish Watson	Flanker	15 October 1991 (aged 24)	2	(Scotland) Edinburgh
Ryan Wilson	Number 8	18 May 1989 (age 37)	15	(Scotland) Glasgow Warriors
Grayson Hart	Scrum-half	19 June 1988 (aged 27)	3	(Scotland) Glasgow Warriors
Henry Pyrgos	Scrum-half	9 July 1989 (aged 26)	17	(Scotland) Glasgow Warriors

== Wales ==
On 19 January, Warren Gatland named a 37-man squad for the 2016 Six Nations Championship.

Head Coach: (New Zealand) Warren Gatland

Note: Flags indicate national union for the club/province as defined by World Rugby.

Player	Position	Date of birth (age)	Caps	Club/province
Scott Baldwin ‡	Hooker	12 July 1988 (aged 27)	15	(Wales) Ospreys
Kristian Dacey	Hooker	25 July 1989 (aged 26)	2	(Wales) Cardiff Blues
Ken Owens	Hooker	3 January 1987 (aged 29)	34	(Wales) Scarlets
Rob Evans	Prop	14 April 1992 (aged 23)	3	(Wales) Scarlets
Tomas Francis	Prop	27 April 1992 (aged 23)	7	(England) Exeter Chiefs
Paul James	Prop	13 May 1982 (aged 33)	65	(Wales) Ospreys
Aaron Jarvis	Prop	20 May 1986 (aged 29)	16	(Wales) Ospreys
Gethin Jenkins	Prop	17 November 1980 (aged 35)	119	(Wales) Cardiff Blues
Samson Lee ‡	Prop	30 November 1992 (aged 23)	17	(Wales) Scarlets
Jake Ball ‡	Lock	21 June 1991 (aged 24)	15	(Wales) Scarlets
Luke Charteris	Lock	9 March 1983 (aged 32)	62	(France) Racing 92
Bradley Davies	Lock	9 January 1987 (aged 29)	49	(England) Wasps
Dominic Day	Lock	22 August 1985 (aged 30)	3	(England) Bath
Alun Wyn Jones ‡	Lock	19 September 1985 (aged 30)	94	(Wales) Ospreys
Josh Turnbull	Flanker	12 March 1988 (aged 27)	7	(Wales) Cardiff Blues
James King ‡	Flanker	24 July 1990 (aged 25)	7	(Wales) Ospreys
Dan Lydiate ‡	Flanker	18 December 1987 (aged 28)	51	(Wales) Ospreys
Ross Moriarty	Flanker	18 April 1994 (aged 21)	4	(England) Gloucester
Justin Tipuric	Flanker	6 August 1989 (aged 26)	38	(Wales) Ospreys
Sam Warburton (c) ‡	Flanker	5 October 1988 (aged 27)	60	(Wales) Cardiff Blues
Taulupe Faletau	Number 8	12 November 1990 (aged 25)	52	(Wales) Newport Gwent Dragons
Aled Davies	Scrum-half	19 July 1992 (aged 23)	0	(Wales) Scarlets
Gareth Davies	Scrum-half	18 August 1990 (aged 25)	9	(Wales) Scarlets
Lloyd Williams	Scrum-half	30 November 1989 (aged 26)	24	(Wales) Cardiff Blues
Dan Biggar ‡	Fly-half	16 October 1989 (aged 26)	39	(Wales) Ospreys
Rhys Priestland	Fly-half	9 January 1987 (aged 29)	40	(England) Bath
Cory Allen	Centre	11 February 1993 (aged 22)	4	(Wales) Cardiff Blues
Jonathan Davies	Centre	5 April 1988 (aged 27)	48	(France) Clermont
Tyler Morgan ‡	Centre	11 September 1995 (aged 20)	3	(Wales) Newport Gwent Dragons
Jamie Roberts	Centre	8 November 1986 (age 39)	74	(England) Harlequins
Hallam Amos	Wing	24 September 1994 (aged 21)	5	(Wales) Newport Gwent Dragons
Alex Cuthbert	Wing	5 April 1990 (aged 25)	40	(Wales) Cardiff Blues
Tom James	Wing	17 April 1987 (aged 28)	10	(Wales) Cardiff Blues
George North	Wing	13 April 1992 (aged 23)	55	(England) Northampton Saints
Gareth Anscombe ‡	Fullback	10 May 1991 (aged 24)	3	(Wales) Cardiff Blues
Matthew Morgan	Fullback	23 April 1992 (aged 23)	5	(England) Bristol
Liam Williams	Fullback	9 April 1991 (aged 24)	26	(Wales) Scarlets

‡ – Denotes dual contracted players.

=== Call-ups ===
On 7 March, Rhys Webb returned to the national squad haven recovered from injury sustained pre-championship.

Note: Flags indicate national union for the club/province as defined by World Rugby.

Player	Position	Date of birth (age)	Caps	Club/province
Rhys Webb ‡	Scrum-half	9 December 1988 (aged 27)	16	(Wales) Ospreys

‡ – Denotes dual contracted players.
