= 2015 Six Nations Championship =

Rugby union competition in Europe

- Date: 6 February – 21 March 2015
- Countries: England; France; Ireland; Italy; Scotland; Wales

Tournament statistics
- Champions: Ireland (13th title)
- Matches played: 15
- Attendance: 1,040,680 (69,379 per match)
- Tries scored: 62 (4.13 per match)
- Top point scorer: (England) George Ford (75)
- Top try scorer: (England) Jonathan Joseph (4)
- Player of the tournament: (Ireland) Paul O'Connell
- Official website: Six Nations Website

The 2015 Six Nations Championship, known as the 2015 RBS 6 Nations because of the tournament's sponsorship by the Royal Bank of Scotland, was the 16th series of the Six Nations Championship, the annual rugby union tournament. It was contested by England, France, Ireland, Italy, Scotland and Wales. Including the competition's previous incarnations as the Home Nations Championship and Five Nations Championship, it was the 121st edition of the tournament.

Ireland retained their title from the previous year, their 13th triumph in the competition. This was the first time that Ireland had retained their title outright since 1949, having shared the 1983 championship with France after winning in 1982. They were the first team to be awarded the redesigned Six Nations trophy introduced for 2015, which featured six sides as opposed to five.

== Participants ==
Nation	Stadium			Head coach	Captain
Nation	Home stadium	Capacity	City	Head coach	Captain
England	Twickenham Stadium	82,000	London	(England) Stuart Lancaster	Chris Robshaw
France	Stade de France	81,338	Saint-Denis	(France) Philippe Saint-André	Thierry Dusautoir
Ireland	Aviva Stadium	51,700	Dublin	(New Zealand) Joe Schmidt	Paul O'Connell
Italy	Stadio Olimpico	73,261	Rome	(France) Jacques Brunel	Sergio Parisse*
Scotland	Murrayfield Stadium	67,144	Edinburgh	(New Zealand) Vern Cotter	Greig Laidlaw
Wales	Millennium Stadium	74,500	Cardiff	(New Zealand) Warren Gatland	Sam Warburton

* Parisse did not play in Italy's final match at home against Wales after an injury sustained in their round four match against France. Leonardo Ghiraldini took his place as captain.

== Table ==
Pos	Team	Pld	W	D	L	PF	PA	PD	T	Pts
1	Ireland	5	4	0	1	119	56	+63	8	8
2	England	5	4	0	1	157	100	+57	18	8
3	Wales	5	4	0	1	146	93	+53	13	8
4	France	5	2	0	3	103	101	+2	9	4
5	Italy	5	1	0	4	62	182	−120	8	2
6	Scotland	5	0	0	5	73	128	−55	6	0

Source: RBS 6 Nations Table (accessed 21 March 2015)

== Fixtures ==
The 2015 Six Nations Championship commenced with a Friday night fixture, once again held at the Millennium Stadium in Cardiff, this time between Wales and England.

=== Round 1 ===
6 February 2015
20:05 GMT (UTC+0)

Wales	16–21	England
Try: Webb 7' c Con: Halfpenny (1/1) 8'; Pen: Halfpenny (2/3) 1', 23'; Drop: Biggar (1/1) 40'	Report	Try: Watson 14' m Joseph 43' c Con: Ford (1/2) 45'; Pen: Ford (3/4) 31', 61', 78'

Millennium Stadium, Cardiff
Attendance: 73,815
Referee: Jérôme Garcès (France)

FB	15	Leigh Halfpenny
RW	14	Alex Cuthbert	(yellow card) 60'
OC	13	Jonathan Davies
IC	12	Jamie Roberts
LW	11	George North		(substituted off) 30'	(substituted on) 38'
FH	10	Dan Biggar
SH	9	Rhys Webb		(substituted off) 68'
N8	8	Taulupe Faletau
OF	7	Sam Warburton (c)
BF	6	Dan Lydiate
RL	5	Alun Wyn Jones
LL	4	Jake Ball		(substituted off) 68'
TP	3	Samson Lee		(substituted off) 71'
HK	2	Richard Hibbard
LP	1	Gethin Jenkins		(substituted off) 59'
Replacements:
HK	16	Scott Baldwin
PR	17	Paul James		(substituted on) 59'
PR	18	Aaron Jarvis		(substituted on) 71'
LK	19	Luke Charteris		(substituted on) 68'
FL	20	Justin Tipuric
SH	21	Mike Phillips		(substituted on) 68'
FH	22	Rhys Priestland
FB	23	Liam Williams		(substituted on) 30'	(substituted off) 38'
Coach:
(New Zealand) Warren Gatland

FB	15	Mike Brown
RW	14	Anthony Watson
OC	13	Jonathan Joseph
IC	12	Luther Burrell	(substituted off) 75'
LW	11	Jonny May
FH	10	George Ford
SH	9	Ben Youngs	(substituted off) 68'
N8	8	Billy Vunipola
OF	7	Chris Robshaw (c)
BF	6	James Haskell
RL	5	George Kruis	(substituted off) 71'
LL	4	Dave Attwood
TP	3	Dan Cole	(substituted off) 61'
HK	2	Dylan Hartley	(substituted off) 54'
LP	1	Joe Marler	(substituted off) 54'
Replacements:
HK	16	Tom Youngs	(substituted on) 54'
PR	17	Mako Vunipola	(substituted on) 54'
PR	18	Kieran Brookes	(substituted on) 61'
N8	19	Nick Easter	(substituted on) 71'
FL	20	Tom Croft
SH	21	Richard Wigglesworth	(substituted on) 68'
FH	22	Danny Cipriani
CE	23	Billy Twelvetrees	(substituted on) 75'
Coach:
(England) Stuart Lancaster

Man of the Match:
George Ford (England)

Touch judges:
Romain Poite (France)
Mathieu Raynal (France)
Television match official:
Simon McDowell (Ireland)

Notes:

- Welsh captain Sam Warburton earned his 50th cap for Wales.

7 February 2015
15:30 CET (UTC+1)

Italy	3–26	Ireland
Pen: Haimona (1/1) 40'	Report	Try: Murray 64' c O'Donnell 66' c Con: Keatley (1/1) 65'; Madigan (1/1) 67'; Pen: Keatley (4/4) 6', 20', 35', 57'

Stadio Olimpico, Rome
Attendance: 57,700
Referee: Pascal Gaüzère (France)

FB	15	Andrea Masi		(substituted off) 76'
RW	14	Leonardo Sarto
OC	13	Michele Campagnaro		(substituted off) 63'
IC	12	Luca Morisi
LW	11	Luke McLean
FH	10	Kelly Haimona
SH	9	Edoardo Gori
N8	8	Sergio Parisse (c)
OF	7	Francesco Minto		(substituted off) 68'	(substituted on) 74'
BF	6	Alessandro Zanni		(substituted off) 46'
RL	5	George Biagi				(substituted off) 74'
LL	4	Joshua Furno
TP	3	Martin Castrogiovanni		(substituted off) 68'
HK	2	Leonardo Ghiraldini	(yellow card) 63'		(substituted off) 74'
LP	1	Matías Agüero		(substituted off) 52'
Replacements:
HK	16	Andrea Manici		(substituted on) 68'
PR	17	Alberto De Marchi		(substituted on) 52'
PR	18	Dario Chistolini		(substituted on) 68'
LK	19	Marco Fuser			(substituted on) 67'
FL	20	Marco Barbini		(substituted on) 46'	67' to 74'
SH	21	Guglielmo Palazzani
FH	22	Tommaso Allan		(substituted on) 63'
WG	23	Giovanbattista Venditti		(substituted on) 76'
Coach:
(France) Jacques Brunel

FB	15	Rob Kearney
RW	14	Tommy Bowe	(substituted off) 67'
OC	13	Jared Payne
IC	12	Robbie Henshaw
LW	11	Simon Zebo
FH	10	Ian Keatley	(substituted off) 65'
SH	9	Conor Murray	(substituted off) 68'
N8	8	Jordi Murphy
OF	7	Tommy O'Donnell
BF	6	Peter O'Mahony	(substituted off) 65'
RL	5	Paul O'Connell (c)
LL	4	Devin Toner
TP	3	Mike Ross	(substituted off) 51'
HK	2	Rory Best	(substituted off) 46'
LP	1	Jack McGrath	(substituted off) 67'
Replacements:
HK	16	Seán Cronin	(substituted on) 46'
PR	17	James Cronin	(substituted on) 67'
PR	18	Martin Moore	(substituted on) 51'
LK	19	Iain Henderson	(substituted on) 65'
N8	20	Robbie Diack
SH	21	Isaac Boss	(substituted on) 68'
FH	22	Ian Madigan	(substituted on) 65'
FB	23	Felix Jones	(substituted on) 67'
Coach:
(New Zealand) Joe Schmidt

Man of the Match:
Conor Murray (Ireland)

Touch judges:
Wayne Barnes (England)
Stuart Berry (South Africa)
Television match official:
Graham Hughes (England)

Notes:

- Marco Barbini made his international debut for Italy.
- Seán O'Brien was set to return to the Irish line-up after injury, but was replaced by Tommy O'Donnell in the starting XV following injury in the pre-game warm-up.

7 February 2015
18:00 CET (UTC+1)

France	15–8	Scotland
Pen: Lopez (5/6) 2', 16', 37', 49', 78'	Report	Try: Fife 39' m Pen: Laidlaw (1/1) 13'

Stade de France, Saint-Denis
Attendance: 78,191
Referee: Nigel Owens (Wales)

FB	15	Scott Spedding
RW	14	Yoann Huget
OC	13	Mathieu Bastareaud	(substituted off) 71'
IC	12	Wesley Fofana
LW	11	Teddy Thomas
FH	10	Camille Lopez
SH	9	Rory Kockott	(substituted off) 54'
N8	8	Damien Chouly
OF	7	Bernard Le Roux
BF	6	Thierry Dusautoir (c)	(substituted off) 79'
RL	5	Yoann Maestri
LL	4	Pascal Papé	(substituted off) 60'
TP	3	Rabah Slimani	(substituted off) 54'
HK	2	Guilhem Guirado	(substituted off) 47'
LP	1	Alexandre Menini	(substituted off) 40'
Replacements:
HK	16	Benjamin Kayser	(substituted on) 47'
PR	17	Uini Atonio	(substituted on) 54'
PR	18	Eddy Ben Arous	(substituted on) 40'
LK	19	Romain Taofifénua	(substituted on) 60'
N8	20	Loann Goujon	(substituted on) 79'
SH	21	Morgan Parra	(substituted on) 54'
FH	22	Rémi Talès
CE	23	Rémi Lamerat	(substituted on) 71'
Coach:
(France) Philippe Saint-André

FB	15	Stuart Hogg
RW	14	Tommy Seymour		(substituted off) 16'
OC	13	Mark Bennett
IC	12	Alex Dunbar		(substituted off) 67'
LW	11	Tim Visser
FH	10	Finn Russell
SH	9	Greig Laidlaw (c)		(substituted off) 78'
N8	8	Johnnie Beattie	(yellow card) 61'
OF	7	Blair Cowan			(substituted off) 54'	(substituted on) 61'
BF	6	Rob Harley		(substituted off) 52'	(substituted on) 54'	(substituted off) 61'
RL	5	Jonny Gray
LL	4	Richie Gray		(substituted off) 64'
TP	3	Euan Murray		(substituted off) 64'
HK	2	Ross Ford		(substituted off) 67'
LP	1	Alasdair Dickinson		(substituted off) 64'
Replacements:
HK	16	Fraser Brown		(substituted on) 67'
PR	17	Gordon Reid		(substituted on) 64'
PR	18	Geoff Cross		(substituted on) 64'
LK	19	Jim Hamilton		(substituted on) 64'
FL	20	Alasdair Strokosch		(substituted on) 52'
SH	21	Sam Hidalgo-Clyne		(substituted on) 78'
CE	22	Peter Horne		(substituted on) 67'
WG	23	Dougie Fife		(substituted on) 16'
Coach:
(New Zealand) Vern Cotter

Man of the Match:
Camille Lopez (France)

Touch judges:
Glen Jackson (New Zealand)
Mike Fraser (New Zealand)
Television match official:
George Ayoub (Australia)

Notes:

- Loann Goujon made his international debut for France.
- Sam Hidalgo-Clyne made his international debut for Scotland.

=== Round 2 ===
14 February 2015
14:30 GMT (UTC+0)

England	47–17	Italy
Try: B. Vunipola 23' m Joseph (2) 26' c, 60' c B. Youngs 54' c Cipriani 63' c Easter 68' m Con: Ford (3/4) 28', 55', 62'; Cipriani (1/2) 63'; Pen: Ford (3/3) 20', 45', 57'	Report	Try: Parisse 3' m Morisi (2) 49' m, 78' c Con: Allan (1/1) 79'

Twickenham Stadium, London
Attendance: 82,061
Referee: John Lacey (Ireland)

FB	15	Mike Brown	(substituted off) 12'
RW	14	Anthony Watson
OC	13	Jonathan Joseph
IC	12	Luther Burrell
LW	11	Jonny May
FH	10	George Ford	(substituted off) 62'
SH	9	Ben Youngs	(substituted off) 66'
N8	8	Billy Vunipola
OF	7	Chris Robshaw (c)
BF	6	James Haskell	(substituted off) 62'
RL	5	George Kruis
LL	4	Dave Attwood	(substituted off) 50'
TP	3	Dan Cole	(substituted off) 58'
HK	2	Dylan Hartley	(substituted off) 58'
LP	1	Joe Marler	(substituted off) 62'
Replacements:
HK	16	Tom Youngs	(substituted on) 58'
PR	17	Mako Vunipola	(substituted on) 62'
PR	18	Kieran Brookes	(substituted on) 58'
N8	19	Nick Easter	(substituted on) 50'
FL	20	Tom Croft	(substituted on) 62'
SH	21	Richard Wigglesworth	(substituted on) 66'
FH	22	Danny Cipriani	(substituted on) 62'
CE	23	Billy Twelvetrees	(substituted on) 12'
Coach:
(England) Stuart Lancaster

FB	15	Luke McLean
RW	14	Leonardo Sarto	(substituted off) 71'
OC	13	Luca Morisi
IC	12	Andrea Masi
LW	11	Giovanbattista Venditti
FH	10	Kelly Haimona	(substituted off) 69'
SH	9	Edoardo Gori	(substituted off) 69'
N8	8	Sergio Parisse (c)
OF	7	Mauro Bergamasco			(substituted off) 58'
BF	6	Francesco Minto	(substituted off) 28'	(substituted on) 37'
RL	5	Marco Bortolami	(substituted off) 45'
LL	4	George Biagi
TP	3	Martin Castrogiovanni	(substituted off) 58'
HK	2	Leonardo Ghiraldini	(substituted off) 58'
LP	1	Alberto De Marchi	(substituted off) 58'
Replacements:
HK	16	Andrea Manici	(substituted on) 58'
PR	17	Matías Agüero	(substituted on) 58'
PR	18	Dario Chistolini	(substituted on) 58'
LK	19	Joshua Furno	(substituted on) 45'
FL	20	Samuela Vunisa	(substituted on) 28'	(substituted off) 37'	(substituted on) 58'
SH	21	Guglielmo Palazzani	(substituted on) 69'
FH	22	Tommaso Allan	(substituted on) 69'
CE	23	Giulio Bisegni	(substituted on) 71'
Coach:
(France) Jacques Brunel

Man of the Match:
Jonathan Joseph (England)

Touch judges:
Pascal Gaüzère (France)
Mike Fraser (New Zealand)
Television match official:
George Ayoub (Australia)

Notes:

- Giulio Bisegni made his international debut for Italy.
- Nick Easter, aged 36, became the oldest English player to score a try in a test match.

14 February 2015
17:00 WET (UTC+0)

Ireland	18–11	France
Pen: Sexton (5/5) 13', 18', 32', 38', 67'; Madigan (1/1) 50'	Report	Try: Taofifénua 70' m Pen: Lopez (2/3) 16', 35'

Aviva Stadium, Dublin
Attendance: 51,200
Referee: Wayne Barnes (England)

FB	15	Rob Kearney
RW	14	Tommy Bowe
OC	13	Jared Payne
IC	12	Robbie Henshaw
LW	11	Simon Zebo
FH	10	Johnny Sexton		44' to 54'
SH	9	Conor Murray
N8	8	Jamie Heaslip		(substituted off) 60'
OF	7	Seán O'Brien		(substituted off) 65'	(substituted on) 71'
BF	6	Peter O'Mahony
RL	5	Paul O'Connell (c)
LL	4	Devin Toner		(substituted off) 74'
TP	3	Mike Ross		(substituted off) 62'
HK	2	Rory Best	(yellow card) 60'		(substituted off) 71'
LP	1	Jack McGrath		(substituted off) 62'
Replacements:
HK	16	Seán Cronin		(substituted on) 65'
PR	17	Cian Healy		(substituted on) 62'
PR	18	Martin Moore		(substituted on) 62'
LK	19	Iain Henderson		(substituted on) 74'
FL	20	Jordi Murphy		(substituted on) 60'
SH	21	Isaac Boss
FH	22	Ian Madigan		(substituted on) 44'	(substituted off) 54'
FB	23	Felix Jones
Coach:
(New Zealand) Joe Schmidt

FB	15	Scott Spedding			(substituted off) 52'
RW	14	Yoann Huget
OC	13	Mathieu Bastareaud		44' to 52'
IC	12	Wesley Fofana		(substituted off) 15'	(substituted on) 22'
LW	11	Teddy Thomas				(substituted off) 32'
FH	10	Camille Lopez
SH	9	Rory Kockott		(substituted off) 65'
N8	8	Damien Chouly		(substituted off) 71'
OF	7	Bernard Le Roux
BF	6	Thierry Dusautoir (c)
RL	5	Yoann Maestri
LL	4	Pascal Papé	(yellow card) 52'	(substituted off) 63'
TP	3	Rabah Slimani		(substituted off) 49'
HK	2	Guilhem Guirado		(substituted off) 49'
LP	1	Eddy Ben Arous		(substituted off) 49'
Replacements:
HK	16	Benjamin Kayser		(substituted on) 49'
PR	17	Uini Atonio		(substituted on) 49'
PR	18	Vincent Debaty		(substituted on) 49'
LK	19	Romain Taofifénua		(substituted on) 63'
N8	20	Loann Goujon		(substituted on) 71'
SH	21	Morgan Parra		(substituted on) 65'
FH	22	Rémi Talès		(substituted on) 44'
CE	23	Rémi Lamerat		(substituted on) 15'	(substituted off) 22'	(substituted on) 32'
Coach:
(France) Philippe Saint-André

Man of the Match:
Johnny Sexton (Ireland)

Touch judges:
Nigel Owens (Wales)
Stuart Berry (South Africa)
Television match official:
Graham Hughes (England)

15 February 2015
15:00 GMT (UTC+0)

Scotland	23–26	Wales
Try: Hogg 9' c Welsh 79' c Con: Laidlaw (1/1) 10'; Russell (1/1) 79'; Pen: Laidlaw (3/3) 17', 44', 54'	Report	Try: Webb 33' c Davies 63' c Con: Halfpenny (2/2) 34', 64'; Pen: Halfpenny (4/5) 6', 19', 31', 48'

Murrayfield Stadium, Edinburgh
Attendance: 67,144
Referee: Glen Jackson (New Zealand)

FB	15	Stuart Hogg
RW	14	Sean Lamont
OC	13	Mark Bennett
IC	12	Alex Dunbar		(substituted off) 58'
LW	11	Tim Visser
FH	10	Finn Russell	(yellow card) 30'
SH	9	Greig Laidlaw (c)		(substituted off) 71'
N8	8	Johnnie Beattie		(substituted off) 58'
OF	7	Blair Cowan
BF	6	Rob Harley
RL	5	Jonny Gray
LL	4	Richie Gray		(substituted off) 56'
TP	3	Geoff Cross		(substituted off) 49'
HK	2	Ross Ford		(substituted off) 71'
LP	1	Alasdair Dickinson		(substituted off) 61'	(substituted on) 64'
Replacements:
HK	16	Fraser Brown		(substituted on) 71'
PR	17	Gordon Reid		(substituted on) 61'	(substituted off) 64'
PR	18	Jon Welsh		(substituted on) 49'
LK	19	Jim Hamilton		(substituted on) 56'
FL	20	Alasdair Strokosch		(substituted on) 58'
SH	21	Sam Hidalgo-Clyne		(substituted on) 71'
FH	22	Greig Tonks
CE	23	Matt Scott		(substituted on) 58'
Coach:
(New Zealand) Vern Cotter

FB	15	Leigh Halfpenny
RW	14	Alex Cuthbert
OC	13	Jonathan Davies	(yellow card) 35'
IC	12	Jamie Roberts
LW	11	Liam Williams
FH	10	Dan Biggar
SH	9	Rhys Webb		(substituted off) 74'
N8	8	Taulupe Faletau
OF	7	Sam Warburton (c)
BF	6	Dan Lydiate		(substituted off) 61'
RL	5	Alun Wyn Jones
LL	4	Jake Ball		(substituted off) 60'
TP	3	Aaron Jarvis		(substituted off) 60'
HK	2	Richard Hibbard		(substituted off) 60'
LP	1	Gethin Jenkins		(substituted off) 71'
Replacements:
HK	16	Scott Baldwin		(substituted on) 60'
PR	17	Paul James		(substituted on) 71'
PR	18	Scott Andrews		(substituted on) 60'
LK	19	Luke Charteris		(substituted on) 60'
FL	20	Justin Tipuric		(substituted on) 61'
SH	21	Mike Phillips		(substituted on) 74'
FH	22	Rhys Priestland
CE	23	Scott Williams
Coach:
(New Zealand) Warren Gatland

Man of the Match:
Alun Wyn Jones (Wales)

Touch judges:
George Clancy (Ireland)
Dudley Phillips (Ireland)
Television match official:
Simon McDowell (Ireland)

=== Round 3 ===
28 February 2015
14:30 GMT (UTC+0)

Scotland	19–22	Italy
Try: Bennett 7' c Con: Laidlaw (1/1) 8'; Pen: Laidlaw (4/4) 1', 15', 26', 66'	Report	Try: Furno 9' m Venditti 36' c Penalty try 79' c Con: Haimona (1/2) 37'; Allan (1/1) 80'; Pen: Haimona (1/2) 17'

Murrayfield Stadium, Edinburgh
Attendance: 62,188
Referee: George Clancy (Ireland)

FB	15	Stuart Hogg
RW	14	Tommy Seymour
OC	13	Mark Bennett		(substituted off) 66'
IC	12	Alex Dunbar
LW	11	Sean Lamont
FH	10	Peter Horne		(substituted off) 78'
SH	9	Greig Laidlaw (c)		(substituted off) 74'
N8	8	Johnnie Beattie		(substituted off) 50'
OF	7	Blair Cowan
BF	6	Rob Harley
RL	5	Jonny Gray
LL	4	Tim Swinson		(substituted off) 69'
TP	3	Euan Murray		(substituted off) 74'
HK	2	Ross Ford		(substituted off) 66'
LP	1	Alasdair Dickinson		(substituted off) 66'
Replacements:
HK	16	Fraser Brown		(substituted on) 66'
PR	17	Ryan Grant		(substituted on) 66'
PR	18	Geoff Cross		(substituted on) 74'
LK	19	Ben Toolis	(yellow card) 77'	(substituted on) 69'
FL	20	Hamish Watson	(yellow card) 79'	(substituted on) 50'
SH	21	Sam Hidalgo-Clyne		(substituted on) 74'
FH	22	Greig Tonks		(substituted on) 78'
CE	23	Matt Scott		(substituted on) 66'
Coach:
(New Zealand) Vern Cotter

FB	15	Luke McLean
RW	14	Michele Visentin
OC	13	Luca Morisi
IC	12	Enrico Bacchin
LW	11	Giovanbattista Venditti	(substituted off) 69'
FH	10	Kelly Haimona	(substituted off) 43'
SH	9	Edoardo Gori
N8	8	Sergio Parisse (c)
OF	7	Simone Favaro	(substituted off) 61'
BF	6	Francesco Minto
RL	5	Joshua Furno
LL	4	George Biagi	(substituted off) 66'
TP	3	Dario Chistolini	(substituted off) 56'
HK	2	Leonardo Ghiraldini	(substituted off) 66'
LP	1	Matías Agüero	(substituted off) 56'
Replacements:
HK	16	Andrea Manici	(substituted on) 66'
PR	17	Alberto De Marchi	(substituted on) 56'
PR	18	Lorenzo Cittadini	(substituted on) 56'
LK	19	Marco Fuser	(substituted on) 66'
FL	20	Samuela Vunisa	(substituted on) 61'
SH	21	Guglielmo Palazzani
FH	22	Tommaso Allan	(substituted on) 43'
CE	23	Giulio Bisegni	(substituted on) 69'
Coach:
(France) Jacques Brunel

Man of the Match:
Luke McLean (Italy)

Touch judges:
Romain Poite (France)
Leighton Hodges (Wales)
Television match official:
Graham Hughes (England)

Notes:

- Enrico Bacchin and Michele Visentin made their international debuts for Italy.
- Ben Toolis and Hamish Watson made their international debuts for Scotland.
- Italy got its first Six Nations win since beating Ireland 22–15 in 2013, and its second away win since beating Scotland 37–17 in 2007.

28 February 2015
18:00 CET (UTC+1)

France	13–20	Wales
Try: Dulin 67' c Con: Lopez (1/1) 68'; Pen: Lopez (2/4) 17', 48'	Report	Try: Biggar 59' m Pen: Halfpenny (5/5) 7', 28', 51', 64', 73'

Stade de France, Saint-Denis
Attendance: 78,814
Referee: Jaco Peyper (South Africa)

FB	15	Brice Dulin
RW	14	Yoann Huget
OC	13	Rémi Lamerat	(substituted off) 17'
IC	12	Wesley Fofana	(substituted off) 69'
LW	11	Sofiane Guitoune
FH	10	Camille Lopez
SH	9	Morgan Parra	(substituted off) 52'
N8	8	Damien Chouly	(substituted off) 73'
OF	7	Bernard Le Roux
BF	6	Thierry Dusautoir (c)
RL	5	Yoann Maestri
LL	4	Romain Taofifénua	(substituted off) 61'
TP	3	Rabah Slimani	(substituted off) 52'
HK	2	Guilhem Guirado	(substituted off) 52'
LP	1	Eddy Ben Arous	(substituted off) 52'
Replacements:
HK	16	Benjamin Kayser	(substituted on) 52'
PR	17	Uini Atonio	(substituted on) 52'
PR	18	Vincent Debaty	(substituted on) 52'
LK	19	Jocelino Suta	(substituted on) 61'
N8	20	Loann Goujon	(substituted on) 73'
SH	21	Sébastien Tillous-Borde	(substituted on) 52'
FH	22	Rémi Talès	(substituted on) 69'
CE	23	Mathieu Bastareaud	(substituted on) 17'
Coach:
(France) Philippe Saint-André

FB	15	Leigh Halfpenny
RW	14	George North
OC	13	Jonathan Davies
IC	12	Jamie Roberts
LW	11	Liam Williams
FH	10	Dan Biggar	(substituted off) 74'
SH	9	Rhys Webb
N8	8	Taulupe Faletau
OF	7	Sam Warburton (c)	(substituted off) 69'
BF	6	Dan Lydiate
RL	5	Alun Wyn Jones
LL	4	Luke Charteris	(substituted off) 69'
TP	3	Samson Lee	(substituted off) 79'
HK	2	Scott Baldwin	(substituted off) 69'
LP	1	Gethin Jenkins	(substituted off) 69'
Replacements:
HK	16	Richard Hibbard	(substituted on) 69'
PR	17	Paul James	(substituted on) 69'
PR	18	Aaron Jarvis	(substituted on) 79'
LK	19	Bradley Davies	(substituted on) 69'
FL	20	Justin Tipuric	(substituted on) 69'
SH	21	Mike Phillips
FH	22	Rhys Priestland	(substituted on) 74'
CE	23	Scott Williams
Coach:
(New Zealand) Warren Gatland

Man of the Match:
Morgan Parra (France)

Touch judges:
JP Doyle (England)
Marius Mitrea (Italy)
Television match official:
Simon McDowell (Ireland)

Notes:

- Brice Dulin's try was France's first try against Wales since their 2011 Six Nations fixture.
- Wales captain Sam Warburton equalled Ryan Jones' record of 33 Tests as captain.
- George North became the youngest player to earn 50 international caps (47 for Wales, 3 for the British and Irish Lions) at the age of 22, surpassing Australia's Joe Roff, who was 24.

1 March 2015
15:00 WET (UTC+0)

Ireland	19–9	England
Try: Henshaw 52' c Con: Sexton (1/1) 52'; Pen: Sexton (4/5) 1', 8', 29', 47'	Report	Pen: Ford (2/3) 58', 67'; Drop: Ford (1/1) 11'

Aviva Stadium, Dublin
Attendance: 51,200
Referee: Craig Joubert (South Africa)

FB	15	Rob Kearney
RW	14	Tommy Bowe
OC	13	Jared Payne	(substituted off) 70'
IC	12	Robbie Henshaw
LW	11	Simon Zebo
FH	10	Johnny Sexton	(substituted off) 54'
SH	9	Conor Murray
N8	8	Jordi Murphy
OF	7	Seán O'Brien	(substituted off) 24'
BF	6	Peter O'Mahony
RL	5	Paul O'Connell (c)
LL	4	Devin Toner	(substituted off) 65'
TP	3	Mike Ross	(substituted off) 57'
HK	2	Rory Best	(substituted off) 73'
LP	1	Jack McGrath	(substituted off) 58'
Replacements:
HK	16	Seán Cronin	(substituted on) 73'
PR	17	Cian Healy	(substituted on) 58'
PR	18	Martin Moore	(substituted on) 57'
LK	19	Iain Henderson	(substituted on) 65'
FL	20	Tommy O'Donnell	(substituted on) 24'
SH	21	Eoin Reddan
FH	22	Ian Madigan	(substituted on) 54'
FB	23	Felix Jones	(substituted on) 70'
Coach:
(New Zealand) Joe Schmidt

FB	15	Alex Goode
RW	14	Anthony Watson
OC	13	Jonathan Joseph	(substituted off) 67'
IC	12	Luther Burrell
LW	11	Jack Nowell
FH	10	George Ford
SH	9	Ben Youngs	(substituted off) 67'
N8	8	Billy Vunipola
OF	7	Chris Robshaw (c)
BF	6	James Haskell	(substituted off) 61'
RL	5	George Kruis
LL	4	Dave Attwood	(substituted off) 67'
TP	3	Dan Cole
HK	2	Dylan Hartley	(substituted off) 53'
LP	1	Joe Marler	(substituted off) 65'
Replacements:
HK	16	Tom Youngs	(substituted on) 53'
PR	17	Mako Vunipola	(substituted on) 65'
PR	18	Henry Thomas
N8	19	Nick Easter	(substituted on) 67'
FL	20	Tom Croft	(substituted on) 61'
SH	21	Richard Wigglesworth	(substituted on) 67'
FH	22	Danny Cipriani
CE	23	Billy Twelvetrees	(substituted on) 67'
Coach:
(England) Stuart Lancaster

Man of the Match:
Robbie Henshaw (Ireland)

Touch judges:
Jérôme Garcès (France)
Mathieu Raynal (France)
Television match official:
Deon van Blommestein (South Africa)

Notes:

- Nick Easter earned his 50th cap for England.
- Ireland reclaim the Millennium Trophy for the first time since 2011.

=== Round 4 ===
14 March 2015
14:30 GMT (UTC+0)

Wales	23–16	Ireland
Try: S. Williams 61' m Pen: Halfpenny (5/5) 2', 7', 11', 13', 74'; Drop: Biggar (1/1) 33'	Report	Try: Penalty try 68' c Con: Sexton (1/1) 69'; Pen: Sexton (3/4) 17', 29', 36'

Millennium Stadium, Cardiff
Attendance: 73,950
Referee: Wayne Barnes (England) (Note: Referee Wayne Barnes replaced referee Steve Walsh for the match between Wales and Ireland after Walsh withdrew due to "business commitments". Barnes was due to be a touch judge for the match between Italy and France; he was replaced by referee Nigel Owens. Referee Chris Pollock was due to be a touch judge for the match between Wales and Ireland, but he was replaced by referee Jérôme Garcès.)

FB	15	Leigh Halfpenny
RW	14	George North
OC	13	Jonathan Davies	(yellow card) 77'
IC	12	Jamie Roberts		(substituted off) 59'
LW	11	Liam Williams
FH	10	Dan Biggar
SH	9	Rhys Webb		(substituted off) 68'
N8	8	Taulupe Faletau
OF	7	Sam Warburton (c)	(yellow card) 27'
BF	6	Dan Lydiate		(substituted off) 68'
RL	5	Alun Wyn Jones		(substituted off) 71'
LL	4	Luke Charteris
TP	3	Samson Lee		(substituted off) 12'
HK	2	Scott Baldwin		(substituted off) 56'	(substituted on) 78'
LP	1	Gethin Jenkins		(substituted off) 40'
Replacements:
HK	16	Richard Hibbard		(substituted on) 56'	(substituted off) 78'
PR	17	Rob Evans		(substituted on) 40'
PR	18	Aaron Jarvis		(substituted on) 12'
LK	19	Jake Ball		(substituted on) 71'
FL	20	Justin Tipuric		(substituted on) 68'
SH	21	Mike Phillips		(substituted on) 68'
FH	22	Rhys Priestland
CE	23	Scott Williams		(substituted on) 59'
Coach:
(New Zealand) Warren Gatland

FB	15	Rob Kearney
RW	14	Tommy Bowe
OC	13	Jared Payne
IC	12	Robbie Henshaw
LW	11	Simon Zebo
FH	10	Johnny Sexton	(substituted off) 74'
SH	9	Conor Murray	(substituted off) 62'
N8	8	Jamie Heaslip	(substituted off) 71'
OF	7	Seán O'Brien
BF	6	Peter O'Mahony
RL	5	Paul O'Connell (c)
LL	4	Devin Toner	(substituted off) 62'
TP	3	Mike Ross	(substituted off) 62'
HK	2	Rory Best	(substituted off) 62'
LP	1	Jack McGrath	(substituted off) 56'
Replacements:
HK	16	Seán Cronin	(substituted on) 62'
PR	17	Cian Healy	(substituted on) 56'
PR	18	Martin Moore	(substituted on) 62'
LK	19	Iain Henderson	(substituted on) 62'
FL	20	Jordi Murphy	(substituted on) 71'
SH	21	Eoin Reddan	(substituted on) 62'
FH	22	Ian Madigan	(substituted on) 74'
FB	23	Felix Jones
Coach:
(New Zealand) Joe Schmidt

Man of the Match:
Sam Warburton (Wales)

Touch judges:
Jérôme Garcès (France)
Federico Anselmi (Argentina)
Television match official:
Graham Hughes (England)

Notes:

- With this Welsh win, no team could win the Grand Slam or the Triple Crown.
- Rob Evans made his international debut for Wales.
- Wales captain Sam Warburton captained his country for a record 34th time, surpassing Ryan Jones' record of 33 Tests as captain.
- Paul O'Connell became the fourth player to earn 100 test caps for Ireland.
- Johnny Sexton and Cian Healy earned their 50th caps for Ireland.

14 March 2015
17:00 GMT (UTC+0)

England	25–13	Scotland
Try: Joseph 4' c Ford 43' c Nowell 75' m Con: Ford (2/3) 5', 43'; Pen: Ford (2/3) 25', 50'	Report	Try: Bennett 21' c Con: Laidlaw (1/1) 22'; Pen: Laidlaw (2/2) 29', 38'

Twickenham Stadium, London
Attendance: 82,000
Referee: Romain Poite (France)

FB	15	Mike Brown	(substituted off) 76'
RW	14	Anthony Watson
OC	13	Jonathan Joseph
IC	12	Luther Burrell
LW	11	Jack Nowell
FH	10	George Ford
SH	9	Ben Youngs	(substituted off) 66'
N8	8	Billy Vunipola
OF	7	Chris Robshaw (c)
BF	6	James Haskell	(substituted off) 66'
RL	5	Courtney Lawes
LL	4	Dave Attwood	(substituted off) 50'
TP	3	Dan Cole	(substituted off) 66'
HK	2	Dylan Hartley	(substituted off) 50'
LP	1	Joe Marler	(substituted off) 59'
Replacements:
HK	16	Tom Youngs	(substituted on) 50'
PR	17	Mako Vunipola	(substituted on) 59'
PR	18	Kieran Brookes	(substituted on) 66'
LK	19	Geoff Parling	(substituted on) 50'
FL	20	Tom Wood	(substituted on) 66'
SH	21	Richard Wigglesworth	(substituted on) 66'
FH	22	Danny Cipriani	(substituted on) 76'
CE	23	Billy Twelvetrees
Coach:
(England) Stuart Lancaster

FB	15	Stuart Hogg
RW	14	Dougie Fife
OC	13	Mark Bennett
IC	12	Matt Scott	(substituted off) 40'
LW	11	Tommy Seymour
FH	10	Finn Russell	(substituted off) 71'
SH	9	Greig Laidlaw (c)
N8	8	David Denton	(substituted off) 54'
OF	7	Blair Cowan
BF	6	Rob Harley	(substituted off) 66'
RL	5	Jonny Gray
LL	4	Jim Hamilton	(substituted off) 35'	(substituted on) 40'	(substituted off) 47'
TP	3	Euan Murray	(substituted off) 54'
HK	2	Ross Ford	(substituted off) 59'
LP	1	Alasdair Dickinson	(substituted off) 59'
Replacements:
HK	16	Fraser Brown	(substituted on) 59'
PR	17	Ryan Grant	(substituted on) 59'
PR	18	Geoff Cross	(substituted on) 54'
LK	19	Tim Swinson	(substituted on) 35'	(substituted off) 40'	(substituted on) 47'
N8	20	Johnnie Beattie	(substituted on) 66'
N8	21	Adam Ashe	(substituted on) 54'
SH	22	Sam Hidalgo-Clyne	(substituted on) 71'
FH	23	Greig Tonks	(substituted on) 40'
Coach:
(New Zealand) Vern Cotter

Man of the Match:
Ben Youngs (England)

Touch judges:
George Clancy (Ireland)
Marius Mitrea (Italy)
Television match official:
Ben Skeen (New Zealand)

Notes:

- England retained the Calcutta Cup.
- With this win, and Wales' win against Ireland, Australia dropped to sixth in the World Rugby Rankings, their lowest ever position.

15 March 2015
16:00 CET (UTC+1)

Italy	0–29	France
	Report	Try: Maestri 45' c Bastareaud 80' c Con: Plisson (2/2) 46', 80'; Pen: Lopez (2/2) 28', 34'; Spedding (1/2) 40'; Plisson (2/2) 41', 57'

Stadio Olimpico, Rome
Attendance: 67,127
Referee: JP Doyle (England)

FB	15	Luke McLean
RW	14	Leonardo Sarto
OC	13	Luca Morisi	(substituted off) 37'
IC	12	Andrea Masi
LW	11	Giovanbattista Venditti
FH	10	Tommaso Allan	(substituted off) 13'
SH	9	Edoardo Gori	(substituted off) 72'
N8	8	Sergio Parisse (c)	(substituted off) 74'
OF	7	Samuela Vunisa
BF	6	Francesco Minto
RL	5	Joshua Furno
LL	4	George Biagi	(substituted off) 50'
TP	3	Dario Chistolini	(substituted off) 50'
HK	2	Leonardo Ghiraldini	(substituted off) 58'
LP	1	Matías Agüero	(substituted off) 32'
Replacements:
HK	16	Andrea Manici	(substituted on) 58'
PR	17	Alberto De Marchi	(substituted on) 32'
PR	18	Lorenzo Cittadini	(substituted on) 50'
LK	19	Quintin Geldenhuys	(substituted on) 50'
FL	20	Marco Barbini	(substituted on) 74'
SH	21	Guglielmo Palazzani	(substituted on) 72'
FH	22	Luciano Orquera	(substituted on) 13'
CE	23	Enrico Bacchin	(substituted on) 37'
Coach:
(France) Jacques Brunel

FB	15	Scott Spedding
RW	14	Yoann Huget
OC	13	Gaël Fickou	(substituted off) 69'
IC	12	Maxime Mermoz
LW	11	Noa Nakaitaci
FH	10	Camille Lopez	(substituted off) 40'
SH	9	Sébastien Tillous-Borde	(substituted off) 63'
N8	8	Loann Goujon	(substituted off) 72'
OF	7	Bernard Le Roux
BF	6	Thierry Dusautoir (c)
RL	5	Yoann Maestri	(substituted off) 64'
LL	4	Alexandre Flanquart
TP	3	Nicolas Mas	(substituted off) 50'
HK	2	Guilhem Guirado	(substituted off) 53'
LP	1	Eddy Ben Arous	(substituted off) 57'
Replacements:
HK	16	Benjamin Kayser	(substituted on) 53'
PR	17	Rabah Slimani	(substituted on) 50'
PR	18	Vincent Debaty	(substituted on) 57'
LK	19	Romain Taofifénua	(substituted on) 64'
N8	20	Damien Chouly	(substituted on) 72'
SH	21	Rory Kockott	(substituted on) 63'
FH	22	Jules Plisson	(substituted on) 40'
CE	23	Mathieu Bastareaud	(substituted on) 69'
Coach:
(France) Philippe Saint-André

Man of the Match:
Thierry Dusautoir (France)

Touch judges:
Nigel Owens (Wales)
Stuart Berry (South Africa)
Television match official:
Simon McDowell (Ireland)

Notes:

- Sergio Parisse won his 112th cap for Italy, a new national record.
- Noa Nakaitaci made his international debut for France.
- This was the first time that Italy failed to score any points in the Six Nations since their 25–0 loss to France in 2004.

=== Round 5 ===
21 March 2015
13:30 CET (UTC+1)

Italy	20–61	Wales
Try: Venditti 24' c Sarto 79' c Con: Orquera (2/2) 26', 80'; Pen: Haimona (1/1) 1'; Orquera (1/1) 10'	Report	Try: Roberts 18' m L. Williams 47' c North (3) 49' c, 54' c, 59' c Webb 66' m Warburton 68' c S. Williams 73' c Con: Biggar (6/7) 47', 50', 55', 59', 69', 73'; Pen: Halfpenny (2/2) 7', 12'; Biggar (1/1) 40'

Stadio Olimpico, Rome
Attendance: 65,827
Referee: Chris Pollock (New Zealand)

FB	15	Luke McLean
RW	14	Leonardo Sarto
OC	13	Luca Morisi
IC	12	Andrea Masi	(yellow card) 52'	(substituted off) 73'
LW	11	Giovanbattista Venditti
FH	10	Kelly Haimona		(substituted off) 4'
SH	9	Edoardo Gori		(substituted off) 73'
N8	8	Samuela Vunisa		(substituted off) 69'
OF	7	Mauro Bergamasco
BF	6	Francesco Minto
RL	5	Joshua Furno
LL	4	George Biagi		(substituted off) 50'
TP	3	Martin Castrogiovanni		(substituted off) 50'
HK	2	Leonardo Ghiraldini (c)		(substituted off) 50'
LP	1	Michele Rizzo		(substituted off) 50'
Replacements:
HK	16	Andrea Manici		(substituted on) 50'
PR	17	Alberto De Marchi		(substituted on) 50'
PR	18	Dario Chistolini		(substituted on) 50'
LK	19	Quintin Geldenhuys	(yellow card) 64'	(substituted on) 50'
FL	20	Robert Barbieri		(substituted on) 69'
SH	21	Guglielmo Palazzani		(substituted on) 73'
FH	22	Luciano Orquera		(substituted on) 4'
CE	23	Enrico Bacchin		(substituted on) 73'
Coach:
(France) Jacques Brunel

FB	15	Leigh Halfpenny	(substituted off) 33'
RW	14	George North
OC	13	Jonathan Davies
IC	12	Jamie Roberts
LW	11	Liam Williams	(substituted off) 70'
FH	10	Dan Biggar
SH	9	Rhys Webb	(substituted off) 70'
N8	8	Taulupe Faletau
OF	7	Sam Warburton (c)
BF	6	Dan Lydiate	(substituted off) 55'
RL	5	Alun Wyn Jones
LL	4	Luke Charteris	(substituted off) 73'
TP	3	Aaron Jarvis	(substituted off) 73'
HK	2	Scott Baldwin	(substituted off) 55'
LP	1	Rob Evans	(substituted off) 52'
Replacements:
HK	16	Ken Owens	(substituted on) 55'
PR	17	Rhys Gill	(substituted on) 52'
PR	18	Scott Andrews	(substituted on) 73'
LK	19	Jake Ball	(substituted on) 73'
FL	20	Justin Tipuric	(substituted on) 55'
SH	21	Gareth Davies	(substituted on) 70'
FH	22	Rhys Priestland	(substituted on) 70'
CE	23	Scott Williams	(substituted on) 33'
Coach:
(New Zealand) Warren Gatland

Man of the Match:
Alun Wyn Jones (Wales)

Touch judges:
JP Doyle (England)
Luke Pearce (England)
Television match official:
Simon McDowell (Ireland)

Notes:

- Wales' 41-point margin of victory was their biggest winning margin over Italy, surpassing the previous record of 39 they set in 1999.

21 March 2015
14:30 GMT (UTC+0)

Scotland	10–40	Ireland
Try: Russell 29' c Con: Laidlaw (1/1) 30'; Pen: Laidlaw (1/1) 17'	Report	Try: O'Connell 4' c O'Brien (2) 24' c, 71' c Payne 49' c Con: Sexton (3/3) 5', 25', 50'; Madigan (1/1) 72'; Pen: Sexton (4/6) 9', 33', 44', 61'

Murrayfield Stadium, Edinburgh
Attendance: 67,144
Referee: Jérôme Garcès (France)

FB	15	Stuart Hogg
RW	14	Dougie Fife		11' to 21'
OC	13	Mark Bennett				(substituted off) 70'
IC	12	Matt Scott		(substituted off) 69'
LW	11	Tommy Seymour
FH	10	Finn Russell
SH	9	Greig Laidlaw (c)		(substituted off) 55'
N8	8	David Denton
OF	7	Blair Cowan
BF	6	Adam Ashe		(substituted off) 55'
RL	5	Jonny Gray
LL	4	Jim Hamilton		(substituted off) 52'
TP	3	Euan Murray		(substituted off) 11'
HK	2	Ross Ford		(substituted off) 52'
LP	1	Ryan Grant		(substituted off) 31'
Replacements:
HK	16	Fraser Brown		(substituted on) 52'
PR	17	Alasdair Dickinson		(substituted on) 31'
PR	18	Geoff Cross	(yellow card) 55'	(substituted on) 11'
LK	19	Tim Swinson		(substituted on) 52'
FL	20	Rob Harley		(substituted on) 55'
SH	21	Sam Hidalgo-Clyne		(substituted on) 55'
FH	22	Greig Tonks		(substituted on) 69'
WG	23	Tim Visser		(substituted on) 11'	(substituted off) 21'	(substituted on) 70'
Coach:
(New Zealand) Vern Cotter

FB	15	Rob Kearney
RW	14	Tommy Bowe
OC	13	Jared Payne
IC	12	Robbie Henshaw
LW	11	Luke Fitzgerald
FH	10	Johnny Sexton	(substituted off) 70'
SH	9	Conor Murray	(substituted off) 79'
N8	8	Jamie Heaslip
OF	7	Seán O'Brien	(substituted off) 72'
BF	6	Peter O'Mahony
RL	5	Paul O'Connell (c)
LL	4	Devin Toner	(substituted off) 61'
TP	3	Mike Ross	(substituted off) 45'
HK	2	Rory Best	(substituted off) 61'
LP	1	Cian Healy	(substituted off) 52'
Replacements:
HK	16	Seán Cronin	(substituted on) 61'
PR	17	Jack McGrath	(substituted on) 52'
PR	18	Martin Moore	(substituted on) 45'
LK	19	Iain Henderson	(substituted on) 61'
FL	20	Jordi Murphy	(substituted on) 72'
SH	21	Eoin Reddan	(substituted on) 79'
FH	22	Ian Madigan	(substituted on) 70'
FB	23	Felix Jones
Coach:
(New Zealand) Joe Schmidt

Man of the Match:
Seán O'Brien (Ireland)

Touch judges:
Pascal Gaüzère (France)
Federico Anselmi (Argentina)
Television match official:
Graham Hughes (England)

Notes:

- Euan Murray earned his 66th test cap to become Scotland's most-capped prop, surpassing Allan Jacobsen's previous record of 65.
- Ireland required a win of at least 21 points in order to remain capable of winning the championship.
- Ireland retain the Centenary Quaich.
- With this loss, Scotland were whitewashed and finished bottom of the table, receiving the wooden spoon for the fourth time in the Six Nations era, and the first time since 2012.

21 March 2015
17:00 GMT (UTC+0)

England	55–35	France
Try: B. Youngs (2) 1' c, 35' c Watson 30' c Ford 46' c Nowell (2) 53' c, 74' c B. Vunipola 63' c Con: Ford (7/7) 3', 30', 36', 46', 54', 63', 75'; Pen: Ford (2/3) 26', 40'	Report	Try: Tillous-Borde 13' m Nakaitaci 17' c Mermoz 42' c Debaty 59' m Kayser 65' m Con: Plisson (2/3) 18', 42'; Kockott (0/2); Pen: Plisson (1/3) 10'; Kockott (1/1) 51'

Twickenham Stadium, London
Attendance: 82,319
Referee: Nigel Owens (Wales)

FB	15	Mike Brown
RW	14	Anthony Watson		(substituted off) 62'
OC	13	Jonathan Joseph
IC	12	Luther Burrell		(substituted off) 71'
LW	11	Jack Nowell
FH	10	George Ford
SH	9	Ben Youngs		(substituted off) 71'
N8	8	Billy Vunipola
OF	7	Chris Robshaw (c)
BF	6	James Haskell	(yellow card) 56'	(substituted off) 67'
RL	5	Courtney Lawes
LL	4	Geoff Parling		(substituted off) 67'
TP	3	Dan Cole		(substituted off) 62'
HK	2	Dylan Hartley		(substituted off) 52'
LP	1	Joe Marler		(substituted off) 62'
Replacements:
HK	16	Tom Youngs		(substituted on) 52'
PR	17	Mako Vunipola		(substituted on) 62'
PR	18	Kieran Brookes		(substituted on) 62'
N8	19	Nick Easter		(substituted on) 67'
FL	20	Tom Wood		(substituted on) 67'
SH	21	Richard Wigglesworth		(substituted on) 71'
FH	22	Danny Cipriani		(substituted on) 62'
CE	23	Billy Twelvetrees		(substituted on) 71'
Coach:
(England) Stuart Lancaster

FB	15	Scott Spedding
RW	14	Yoann Huget
OC	13	Gaël Fickou
IC	12	Maxime Mermoz	(substituted off) 71'
LW	11	Noa Nakaitaci
FH	10	Jules Plisson	(substituted off) 71'
SH	9	Sébastien Tillous-Borde	(substituted off) 48'
N8	8	Loann Goujon	(substituted off) 62'
OF	7	Bernard Le Roux
BF	6	Thierry Dusautoir (c)
RL	5	Yoann Maestri	(substituted off) 67'
LL	4	Alexandre Flanquart
TP	3	Nicolas Mas	(substituted off) 47'
HK	2	Guilhem Guirado	(substituted off) 47'
LP	1	Vincent Debaty	(substituted off) 60'
Replacements:
HK	16	Benjamin Kayser	(substituted on) 47'
PR	17	Rabah Slimani	(substituted on) 47'
PR	18	Uini Atonio	(substituted on) 60'
LK	19	Romain Taofifénua	(substituted on) 67'
N8	20	Damien Chouly	(substituted on) 62'
SH	21	Rory Kockott	(substituted on) 48'
FH	22	Rémi Talès	(substituted on) 71'
CE	23	Mathieu Bastareaud	(substituted on) 71'
Coach:
(France) Philippe Saint-André

Man of the Match:
Ben Youngs (England)

Touch judges:
John Lacey (Ireland)
Leighton Hodges (Wales)
Television match official:
Ben Skeen (New Zealand)

Notes:

- Dan Cole earned his 50th cap for England.
- This is the greatest number of points England has ever scored against France.
- England had to win this game by 26 points or more to claim the Championship. They only won by 20, meaning that Ireland won the Championship instead.

== Statistics ==
=== Points scorers ===
Pos	Name	Team	Pts
1	George Ford	England	75
2	Leigh Halfpenny	Wales	60
3	Johnny Sexton	Ireland	58
4	Greig Laidlaw	Scotland	41
5	Camille Lopez	France	35
6	Dan Biggar	Wales	26
7	Jonathan Joseph	England	20
8	Jules Plisson	France	17
9	George North	Wales	15
9	Jack Nowell	England	15
9	Rhys Webb	Wales	15
9	Ben Youngs	England	15

=== Try scorers ===
Pos	Name	Team	Tries
1	Jonathan Joseph	England	4
2	George North	Wales	3
2	Jack Nowell	England	3
2	Rhys Webb	Wales	3
2	Ben Youngs	England	3
6	Mark Bennett	Scotland	2
6	George Ford	England	2
6	Luca Morisi	Italy	2
6	Seán O'Brien	Ireland	2
6	Giovanbattista Venditti	Italy	2
6	Billy Vunipola	England	2
6	Anthony Watson	England	2
6	Scott Williams	Wales	2

== Broadcasting ==
In the United Kingdom, BBC One televised all the matches live, although for viewers in Scotland the week 4 match between Italy and France was shown on BBC Two Scotland. BBC Two also televised live the buildup of the opening match between Wales and England and after the match, an extra between the two sides on BBC Two but only for viewers in Wales. There was also a special Six Nations special looking ahead to the final week match on BBC Two but only for viewers in Northern Ireland. On the morning of the final week of matches, BBC Two televised classic Five Nations matches including Scotland vs Ireland in 1991 and France vs England in 1992. The final match of the tournament between England and France was watched live on BBC One by 9.63 million people, beating the previous record for that fixture of 9.56 million, set in 2011. This followed audiences of 4.1 million for the match between Italy and Wales and 5.1 million for the match between Scotland and Ireland earlier in the day. The BBC website also received 8.22 million unique browser hits during the day, breaking the previous record of 8.03 million set during the 2012 Summer Olympics in London. S4C simulcasted Wales matches in the Welsh language.
