= Marco Barbini =

Italian rugby union player

- Born: 16 October 1990 (age 36) Padua, Italy
- Height: 1.91 m (6 ft 3 in)
- Weight: 99 kg (15 st 8 lb; 218 lb)

Rugby union career
Youth career
- Petrarca
Senior career
Years	Team	Apps	(Points)
2009-2012	Petrarca	32	(30)
2012-2014	Mogliano	38	(15)
2014-2021	Benetton	105	(20)
- Correct as of 19 Jun 2021
International career
Years	Team	Apps	(Points)
2009-2010	Italy Under 20	3	(0)
2012	Emerging Italy	3	(5)
2015-2019	Italy	3	(0)
- Correct as of 15 March 2015

Marco Barbini (born 16 October 1990) is a retired Italian rugby union player. His usual position was in the back-row.

From 2014 to 2021, Barbini played with Italian Pro14 team Benetton.

From 2009 to 2012 Barbini was named in the Italy Under 20 squad and in 2012 he was named in the Emerging Italy squad for the 2012 IRB Nations Cup. In January 2015, Barbini was called into the Italian squad for the 2015 Six Nations Championship. He represented Italy on 3 occasions, from 2015 to 2019.
