= Michele Visentin =

- Born: Michele Visentin; 13 December 1991 (age 34) Paese, Italy
- Height: 1.85 m (6 ft 1 in)
- Weight: 89 kg (196 lb; 14 st 0 lb)

Rugby union career
- Position: Wing
Senior career
| Years | Team | Apps | (Points) |
| 2010-2011 | F.I.R. Academy | | |
| 2011-2014 | Calvisano | 66 | (80) |
| 2014−2016 | Zebre | 15 | (10) |
| 2016−2018 | Mogliano | 20 | (15) |
| 2018− | Rugby Paese | | |
- Correct as of 30 September 2015
International career
| Years | Team | Apps | (Points) |
| 2011 | Italy Under 20 | 8 | (15) |
| 2013−2014 | Emerging Italy | 4 | (10) |
| 2015 | Italy | 1 | (0) |
- Correct as of 30 September 2015

Michele Visentin (born 13 December 1991) is an Italian rugby union player. His usual position is as a winger, and he currently plays for Zebre.

In January 2015, Visentin was named in the Italian squad for the 2015 Six Nations Championship.
