= Alexandre Dumoulin =

France international rugby union player

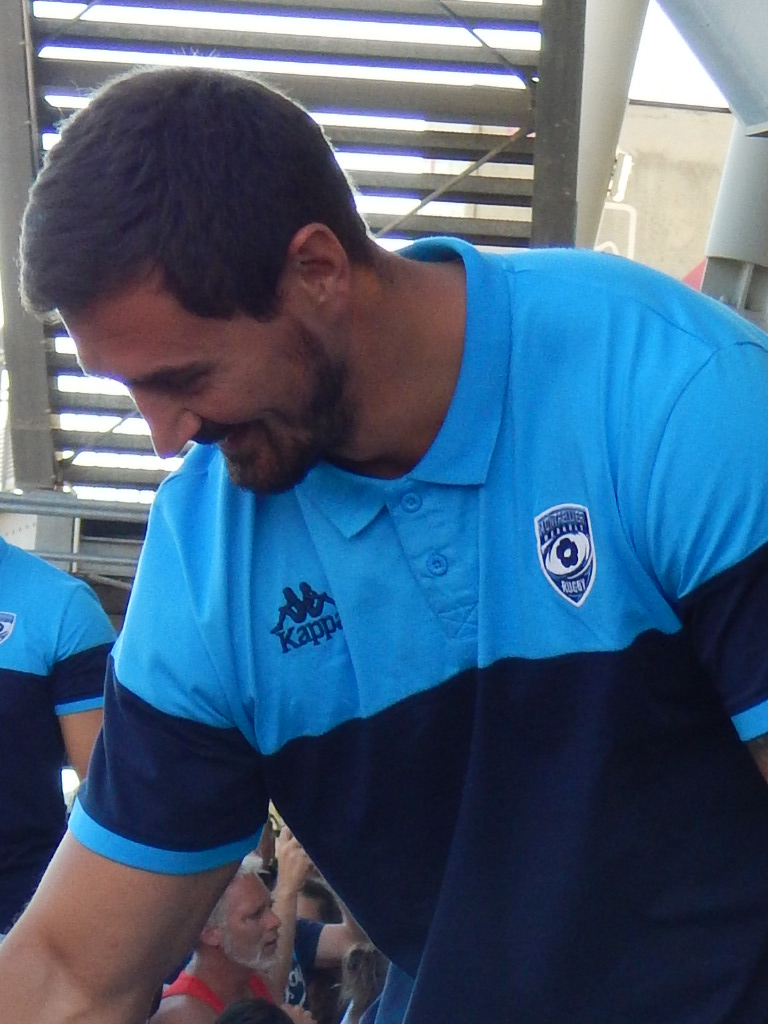
- Born: Alexandre Dumoulin; 24 August 1989 (age 37) Bourgoin-Jallieu, France
- Height: 1.89 m (6 ft 2 1/2 in)
- Weight: 95 kg (14 st 13 lb; 209 lb)
- Notable relative: Marc Cécillon (father)

Rugby union career
- Position: Centre
Senior career
Years	Team	Apps	(Points)
2008-2011	Bourgoin	20	(5)
2011-2016	Racing Métro	71	(35)
2016-19	Montpellier	40	(20)
2019-	Section Paloise	29	(10)
- Correct as of 10 Oct 2021
International career
Years	Team	Apps	(Points)
2014-	France	8	(0)
- Correct as of 17 Oct 2015

Alexandre Dumoulin (born 24 August 1989) is a French rugby union player. His position is centre and he currently plays for Montpellier in the Top 14. In January 2015 he was named in the France 31-man squad for the 2015 Six Nations Championship by coach Philippe Saint-André. He made his debut for France on 8 November 2014 against Fiji.

== Personal life ==
On 30 January 2015, Dumoulin announced that he was the biological son of former French international Marc Cécillon.
