= Andrea Manici =

- Full name: Andrea Manici
- Born: 28 April 1990 (age 36) Parma, Italy
- Height: 1.83 m (6 ft 0 in)
- Weight: 104 kg (16 st 5 lb; 229 lb)

Rugby union career
- Position: Hooker
- Current team: Zebre
Senior career
Years	Team	Apps	(Points)
2009–2011	Gran Parma	27	(15)
2011–2012	Crociati Parma	18	(10)
2012–2018	Zebre	60	(20)
- Correct as of 28 August 2015
International career
Years	Team	Apps	(Points)
2008–10	Italy U20	16	(20)
2011–13	Emerging Italy	4	(0)
2013–18	Italy	16	(0)
- Correct as of 11 October 2015

Andrea Manici (born 28 April 1990) is an Italian rugby union player who plays as a Hooker. He currently plays for Zebre in the Pro14.

In May 2013, Manici was called up by the Italian national rugby union team for the South African Quadrangular Tournament. On 22 June, he made his debut against Samoa.
