= Scott Spedding =

France international rugby union player (born 1986)

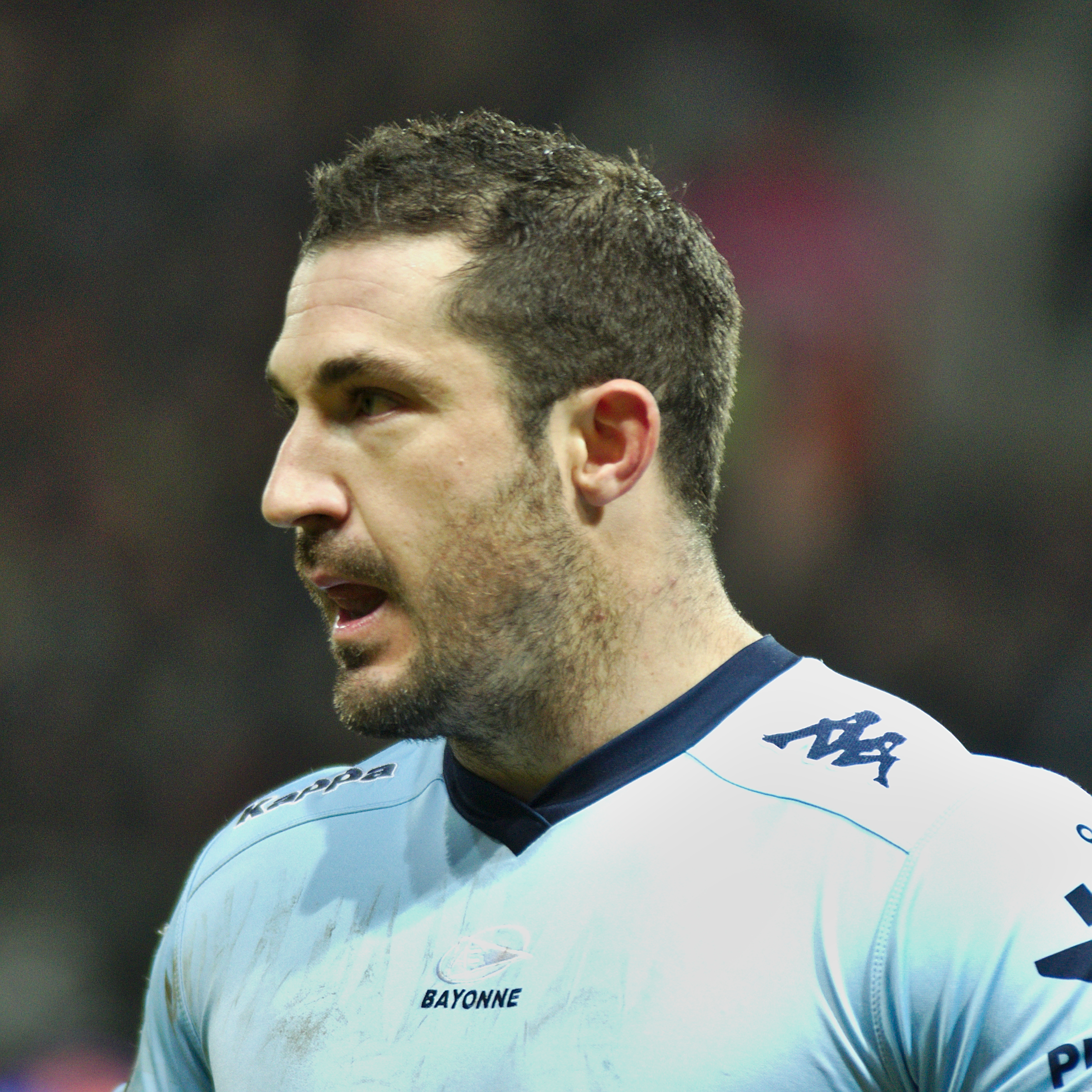
- Spedding playing for Bayonne in 2013
- Born: 4 May 1986 (age 40) Krugersdorp, South Africa
- Height: 1.88 m (6 ft 2 in)
- Weight: 97 kg (214 lb; 15 st 4 lb)

Rugby union career
- Position: Full back
Senior career
Years	Team	Apps	(Points)
2008–2012	Brive	79	(61)
2012–2015	Bayonne	78	(71)
2015–2018	Clermont	55	(59)
2018–2019	Castres	15	(18)
Provincial / State sides
Years	Team	Apps	(Points)
2005–2008	Sharks (Currie Cup)	10	(58)
Super Rugby
Years	Team	Apps	(Points)
2006	Sharks	1	(0)
International career
Years	Team	Apps	(Points)
2006	South Africa U21	5	(17)
2014–2017	France	23	(26)

Scott Spedding (born 4 May 1986) is a retired French rugby union player. His position was as fullback and he last played for Castres Olympique in the Top 14. He retired in 2019.

Spedding attended St. John's College, Johannesburg from 2000 to 2004 where he captained the first XV Rugby team. He was in the same boarding house and matriculated one year after four-time Tour de France champion Chris Froome.

In 2008, Spedding moved to France to play with Brive in the Top 14. After seven years of living in France, Spedding gained French nationality in 2014. In January 2015 he was named in the France 31-man squad for the 2015 Six Nations Championship by coach Philippe Saint-André. He debuted for France on 8 November 2014 against Fiji.

In May 2019, Spedding announced his retirement from rugby. He was also a guest pundit on Supersport during the 2019 Rugby World Cup in Japan.
