= Loann Goujon =

French rugby union player (born 1989)

- Born: 23 April 1989 (age 37) Combronde, France
- Height: 1.94 m (6 ft 4 in)
- Weight: 114 kg (17 st 13 lb; 251 lb)
- School: EM Lyon Business School

Rugby union career
- Position: Flanker / Number 8
Senior career
Years	Team	Apps	(Points)
2008–2012	Clermont	3	(0)
2012–15	La Rochelle	58	(30)
2015-18	Bordeaux	55	(10)
2018-	Lyon	66	(25)
- Correct as of 14 December 2019
International career
Years	Team	Apps	(Points)
2009	France U20	8	(0)
2014–	France	17	(5)
- Correct as of 27 June 2017

Loann Goujon (French pronunciation: [loan ɡuʒɔ̃]; born 23 April 1989) is a French rugby union player. He currently plays for La Rochelle in the Top 14, normally playing at Flanker or Number 8.

== Career ==
Goujon first started playing rugby in 2003 at Junior rugby level. From 2003 to 2005 he played for his local side RC Combronde, before playing for RC Vichy at the age of 16. At the age of 17 he was recruited by Clermont Auvergne to play for the Junior side, and by the age of 19 he was promoted to the senior squad. Although he played for Clermont's second team between 2008 and 2011. During this time, he was selected for the France U20's team to play in the 2009 Six Nations Under 20s Championship. He played in all five games in what was France U20's first Championship title. He was later selected for the 2009 IRB Junior World Championship in Japan, where he was part of the team that beat Wales U20's 68–13 to claim 5th place.

For the 2011–12 Top 14 season, he was offered a full professional contract by Vern Cotter, and was made an official member of the Clermont senior side. He debuted professionally on the 17 September 2011 against Racing Métro in a 22–11 victory. In July 2012, he was loaned to La Rochelle in the Pro D2, to gain some game time and experience. Surprisingly, he played in all but 2 matches in that season, making 23 starts. He remained with the club for the 2013–14 Rugby Pro D2 season, and was a key figure in the team that gained them promotion to the Top 14 for the 2014–15 season. Having put in strong ball carrying performances for La Rochelle, he was called up to the France national side for the 2015 Six Nations Championship by coach Philippe Saint-André. Although he was a late call-up, being added to the squad as injury cover for Louis Picamoles.

He made his international debut off the bench against Scotland in the opening week of the Six Nations, though he replaced captain Thierry Dusautoir on the 79th minute.
