= Benjamin Kayser =

France international rugby union player

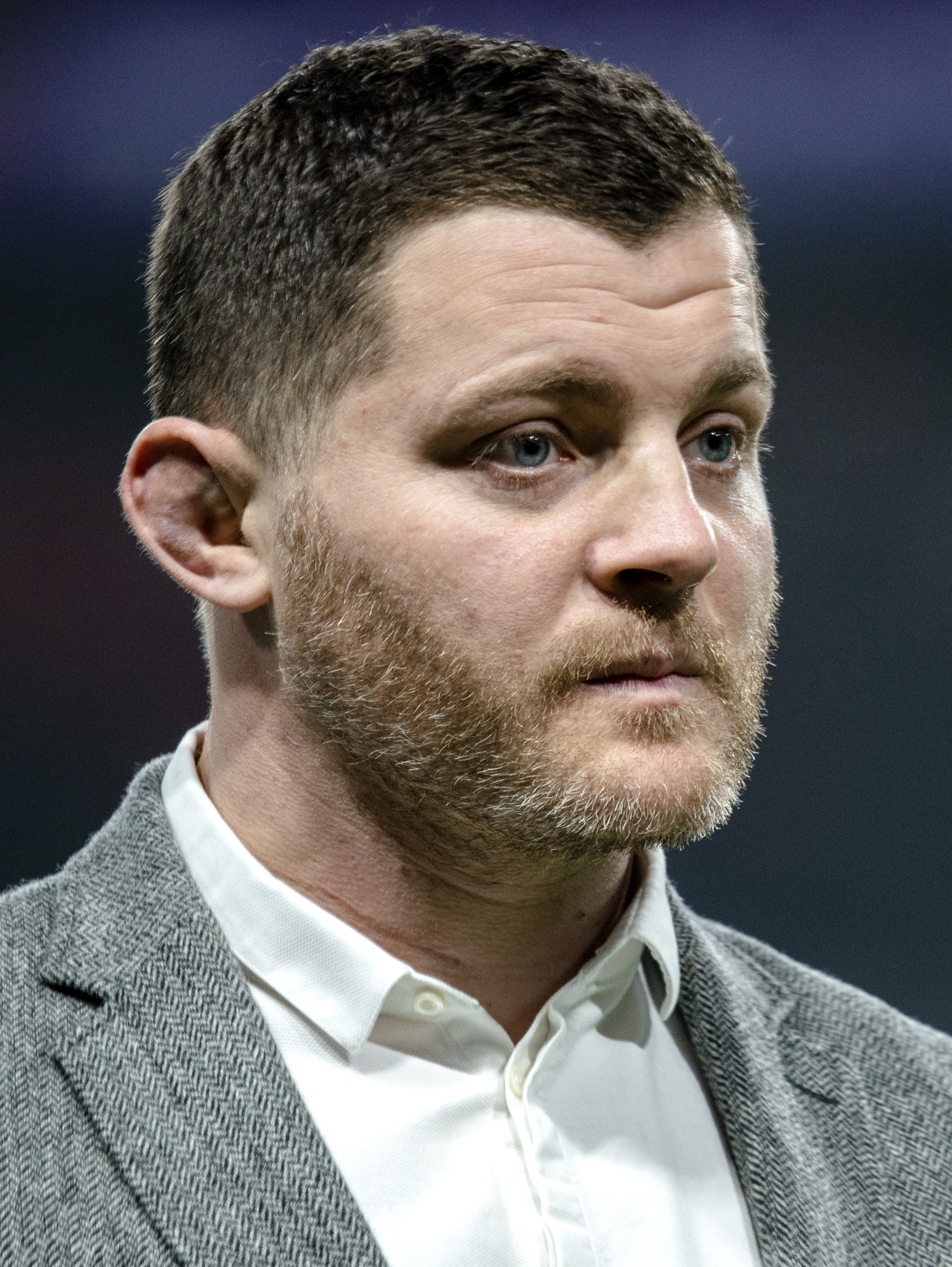
- Born: Benjamin Kayser; 26 July 1984 (age 42) Paris, France
- Height: 6 ft 0 in (1.83 m)
- Weight: 17 st 8 lb (112 kg)

Rugby union career
- Position: Hooker
Senior career
Years	Team	Apps	(Points)
2004–2007	Stade Français	60	(40)
2007–2009	Leicester Tigers	50	(5)
2009–2010	Stade Français	26	(10)
2010–2011	Castres	29	(0)
2011–2019	Clermont	199	(45)
- Correct as of `
International career
Years	Team	Apps	(Points)
2008–2015	France	37	(10)

Benjamin Kayser (born 26 July 1984) is a French former rugby union player.

Kayser rejoined Stade Français at the end of the 2008/2009 season from Leicester Tigers in the Guinness Premiership, who he joined during the 2007–08 season. While at Leicester he played as a replacement as they won the 2009 Premiership final. Kayser signed for Castres Olympique for the 2010–11 Top 14 season. In February 2011, Kayser signed a 3-year contract with ASM Clermont Auvergne.

Kayser played for France at international level, winning his first cap in their summer tour against Australia in 2008.

In 2010, Kayser was selected in the French Barbarians squad to play Tonga on 26 November. Kayser played for the Barbarians in 2018, winning against England at Twickenham.

== Honours ==
(France) Stade Français

- Top 14: 2006–07

(England) Leicester Tigers

- Premiership Rugby: 2008–09

(France) ASM Clermont Auvergne

- Top 14: 2016–17
