= Scott Baldwin (rugby union) =

Wales international rugby union player

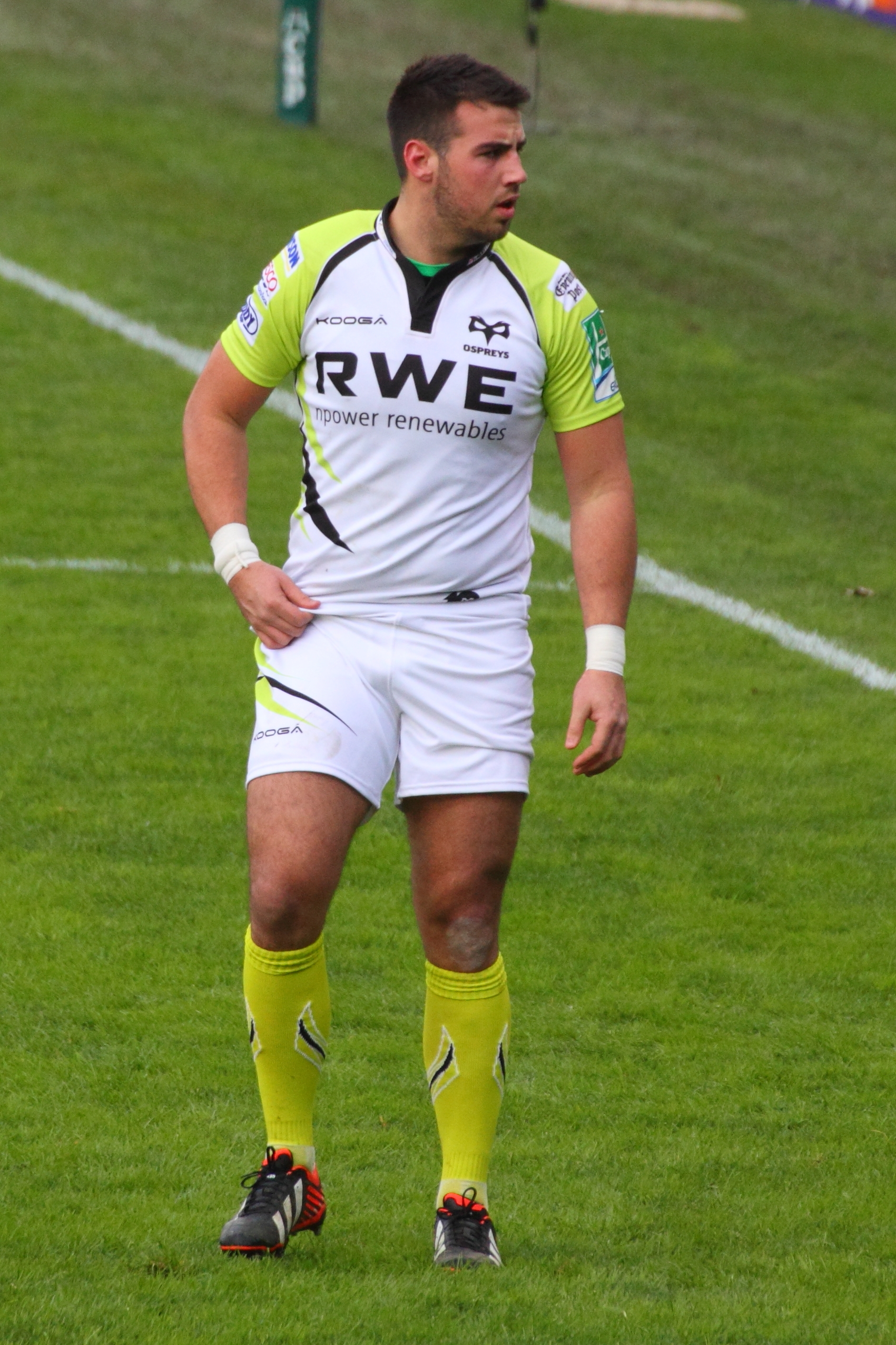
- Baldwin on 8 December 2012
- Born: Scott Baldwin; 12 July 1988 (age 38) Bridgend, Wales
- Height: 1.91 m (6 ft 3 in)
- Weight: 114 kg (251 lb; 17 st 13 lb)

Rugby union career
- Position: Hooker
Youth career
- Bridgend Athletic
Amateur team(s)
Years	Team	Apps	(Points)
2007–2011	Bridgend		
2009–2011	Swansea		
Senior career
Years	Team	Apps	(Points)
2009–2019	Ospreys	162	(45)
2019–2021	Harlequins	37	(20)
2021–2022	Worcester Warriors	13	(0)
2022–2023	Ospreys	17	(10)
- Correct as of 20 June 2023
International career
Years	Team	Apps	(Points)
2013–2023	Wales	37	(5)
- Correct as of 20 June 2023

Scott Baldwin (born 12 July 1988) is a Welsh rugby union coach and former Welsh international rugby union player. He played as a hooker for the Ospreys, Harlequins and Worcester Warriors.

== Club career ==
Bridgend-born Baldwin began his professional career with local team Bridgend Ravens, before signing his contract with the Ospreys in January 2009. Baldwin made his Ospreys debut the same year. In 2011, Baldwin spent six weeks on loan with Italian club ASR Milano.

After ten years with the Ospreys, Baldwin joined Harlequins prior to the 2019–2020 season.

He started in the Premiership final against Exeter on 26 June 2021 as Harlequins won the game 40–38 in the highest scoring Premiership final ever.

Following his Premiership success, Baldwin joined Worcester Warriors ahead of the 2021–22 Premiership Rugby season. Baldwin departed the club during the season, returning to the Ospreys having been released on compassionate grounds.

Baldwin announced his retirement from professional rugby on 20 June 2023.

=== Lion incident ===
Prior to an Ospreys rugby union match against Cheetahs in September 2017, Baldwin was bitten on the hand by a captive lion at Weltevrede Game Lodge near Bloemfontein, South Africa. Ospreys coach Steve Tandy described Baldwin's conduct as "pretty stupid", and added "I don't know what sort of wildlife show Scott has been watching where you can pat a lion on the head as if it's a kitten." The injury resulted in Baldwin missing the fixture against the Cheetahs.

== International career ==
In May 2013, Baldwin was selected in the Wales national rugby union team 32-man training squad for the summer 2013 tour to Japan. He made his international debut in the 2nd test versus Japan on 15 June 2013, as a second-half replacement.

Baldwin had to wait until 2014 for his next cap, but featured in all four tests for Wales during the 2014 Autumn internationals. Baldwin started against South Africa, as Wales secured only their second win over the Springboks, their first in 15 years. He maintained his spot in the Welsh squad for the 2015 Six Nations, impressing during the win over Ireland having completed 20 tackles during his time on the field. Baldwin established himself as first choice hooker, starting the three final tests of the tournament.

Baldwin was selected in the Wales squad for the 2015 Rugby World Cup, and started every match, scoring a try against Fiji in the pool stages.

By the end of 2016, Baldwin found himself increasingly utilised off the bench, with Ken Owens taking the starting shirt. Baldwin featured as a substitute in every match during the 2017 Six Nations.

Baldwin came off the bench against Samoa on 23 June 2017. He was not selected in the squad for the 2018 Six Nations, and upon signing for Harlequins in 2019, was no longer eligible to be selected for Wales due to the 60 cap rule.

On 24 January 2023 Baldwin earned a recall to the Welsh squad, his first selection in more than five years, having been called up to replace the injured Dewi Lake for the 2023 Six Nations.

=== International tries ===
Try	Opponent	Location	Venue	Competition	Date	Result
1	Fiji	Cardiff, Wales	Millennium Stadium	2015 Rugby World Cup	1 October 2015	Win

== Coaching career ==
In 2022, Baldwin was announced as the forwards coach for Bridgend Ravens, the club where he began his career more than a decade prior.

On 20 June 2023, it was announced Baldwin would join Newcastle Falcons as defence coach. He left Newcastle Falcons in June 2024. He is now head coach of Bridgend Ravens
