= George Biagi =

Italian rugby union

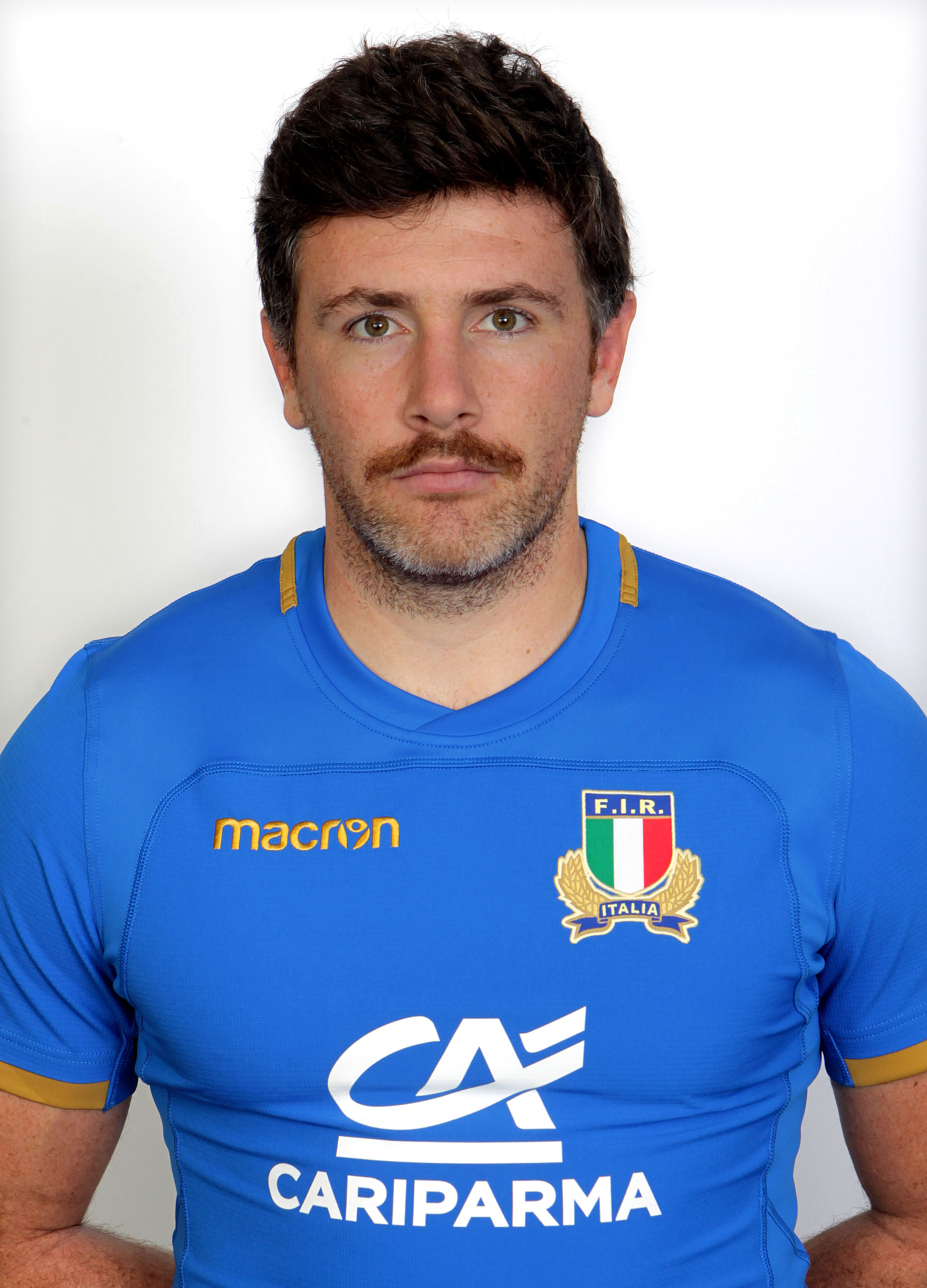
- Full name: George Biagi
- Born: 4 October 1985 (age 41) Irvine, Scotland
- Height: 1.98 m (6 ft 6 in)
- Weight: 117 kg (18 st 6 lb; 258 lb)
- School: Fettes College
- University: Bocconi University

Rugby union career
- Position: Lock
- Current team: Zebre
Youth career
- Fettes College
Senior career
Years	Team	Apps	(Points)
2004−2005	Grande Milano Rugby		
2005−2008	Amatori Milano		
2008-2010	Cavalieri Prato	26	(10)
2010−2012	Aironi	23	(10)
2012−2013	Bristol	7	(0)
2013−2020	Zebre	119	(40)
- Correct as of 21 Feb 2020
International career
Years	Team	Apps	(Points)
2014−2018	Italy	23	(0)
- Correct as of 3 November 2018

George Biagi (born 4 October 1985 in Irvine, Scotland) is a retired Italy international rugby union. He represented Italy on 23 occasions. He was born in Scotland to Scots/Italian father and an Italian mother and later went to Italy to study. He has stated he has equal allegiance to both countries.

Biagi started playing rugby at the age of 13 at Fettes College, Edinburgh. He attended Bocconi University in Milan and started playing with Grande Milano; the following year he moved to Amatori Milano. He was signed by Cavalieri Prato with whom he got promoted to Super 10 (now Top12) and qualified for the European Amlin Challenge Cup. He subsequently transferred to Aironi where he played since the 2010/2011 season, in the Pro12 and the Heineken Cup. In June 2012 he signed for Bristol Rugby but in the summer of 2013, Biagi returned to Italy to join the new franchise Zebre in the Pro12. He played for Zebre until 2019-20 Pro14 season.
