= Aaron Jarvis (rugby union) =

Wales international rugby union footballer

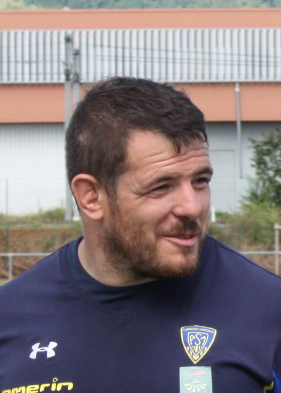
- Born: Aaron Ronald Jarvis; 20 May 1986 (age 40) Exeter, England
- Height: 183 cm (6 ft 0 in)
- Weight: 117 kg (18 st 6 lb; 258 lb)
- School: Honiton Community College
- University: University of Bath
- Occupation: Assistant coach

Rugby union career
- Position: Tighthead/Loosehead Prop
Senior career
Years	Team	Apps	(Points)
2006–2011	Bath	50	(5)
2011–2016	Ospreys	98	(0)
2016–2018	Clermont	40	(10)
2018–2021	Dragons	40	(0)
- Correct as of 13 October 2022
International career
Years	Team	Apps	(Points)
2012–2016	Wales	18	(0)
- Correct as of 13 October 2022
Coaching career
- Years: Team
- 2021-: Dallas Jackals

Aaron Jarvis (born 20 May 1986) is a former Wales international rugby union player. A prop forward he had previously played for the Dragons, ASM Clermont Auvergne, Ospreys and Bath. He was an assistant coach for the Dallas Jackals in the Major League Rugby (MLR).

In February 2011, it was announced that Jarvis had signed for the Ospreys for the 2011–12 season.

Jarvis joined the Dragons for the 2018–19 season. He retired at the end of 2021 to take up a coaching position for the Dallas Jackals.

Jarvis departed from Dallas Jackals along with other coaching and management staff further to an ownership change in 2022.

Jarvis became Head of Rugby at Ivybridge Community College and Forwards Coach at Plymouth Albion.

== International ==
Jarvis is eligible to represent Wales as his grandmother was born in Wales. In October 2012 Jarvis was named in the 35 man Wales squad for the Autumn international series. He made his international debut on 10 November 2012 against Argentina in Cardiff.
