= Dario Chistolini =

Italy international rugby union player

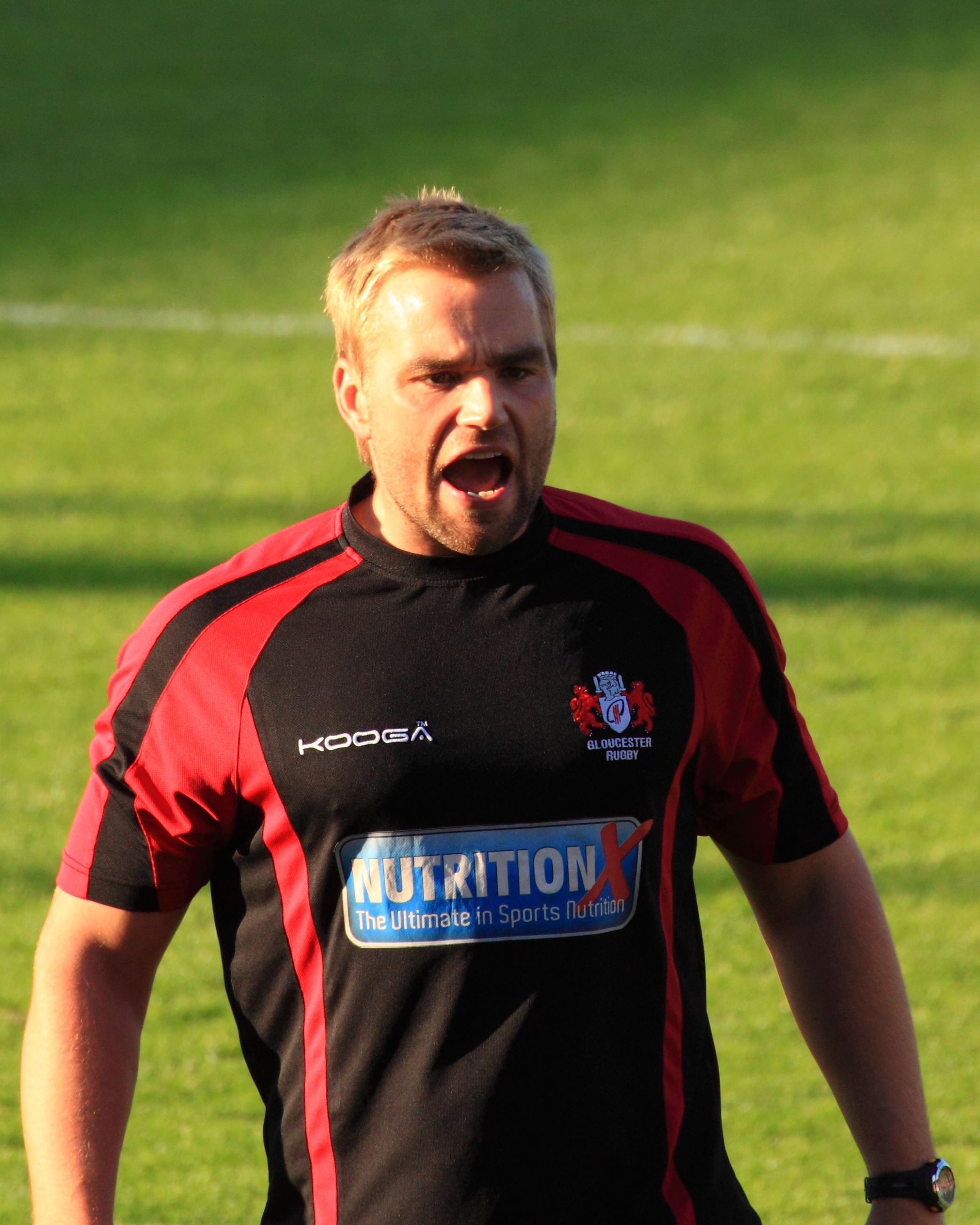
- Full name: Dario Chistolini
- Born: 14 September 1988 (age 38) Kempton Park, South Africa
- Height: 1.80 m (5 ft 11 in)
- Weight: 110 kg (17 st 5 lb; 243 lb)

Rugby union career
- Position: Tighthead Prop
- Current team: Verona Rugby
Youth career
- Boland Rugby
- –: Western Province Academy
Senior career
Years	Team	Apps	(Points)
2007−2011	Petrarca Padova	42	(5)
2011−2013	Gloucester Rugby	30	(0)
2013−2019	Zebre	116	(5)
2019−2022	Valorugby Emilia	36	(30)
2022−2023	Petrarca Padova	10	(0)
2023−	Verona Rugby		
- Correct as of 11 October 2023
International career
Years	Team	Apps	(Points)
2010−2013	Emerging Italy	10	(0)
2014−2017	Italy	20	(0)
- Correct as of 11 October 2023
Coaching career
- Years: Team
- 2023−: Verona Rugby (Assistant coach)

Dario Chistolini (born 14 September 1988 in Kempton Park, South Africa) is a South African-born Italian rugby union player. He currently plays for Verona Rugby in the Italian domestic league Serie A. He plays as a prop and also Assistant coach of First XV.

Dario joined Gloucester for the start of the 2011–12 season. He joined from Petrarca. On 6 April 2013, Chistolini will leave Gloucester to return home to Italy to join the new franchise Zebre for 2013/14 season. In 2022–2023 season, he played for Petrarca Padova in the Italian domestic league Top10.

He previously played for Italy A. Chistolini was selected for Italy for the 2014 mid-year Test series. He made his debut, as a replacement from the bench, losing to Samoa 15–0 on 14 June 2014.
