= 2017 Six Nations Championship squads =

Rugby union competition squads

This is a list of the complete squads for the 2017 Six Nations Championship, an annual rugby union tournament contested by the national rugby teams of England, France, Ireland, Italy, Scotland and Wales. England are the defending champions.

Note: Number of caps and players' ages are indicated as of 4 February 2017 – the tournament's opening day.

== England ==
On 20 January, head coach Eddie Jones named a 35-man squad.

Head coach: (Australia) Eddie Jones

Player	Position	Date of birth (age)	Caps	Club/province
Jamie George	Hooker	20 October 1990 (aged 26)	12	Saracens
Dylan Hartley (c)	Hooker	24 March 1986 (aged 30)	79	Northampton Saints
Tommy Taylor	Hooker	11 November 1991 (aged 25)	1	Wasps
Dan Cole	Prop	9 May 1987 (aged 29)	69	Leicester Tigers
Nathan Catt	Prop	6 January 1988 (aged 29)	0	Bath
Ellis Genge	Prop	16 February 1995 (aged 21)	1	Leicester Tigers
Joe Marler	Prop	7 July 1990 (aged 26)	46	Harlequins
Matt Mullan	Prop	23 February 1987 (aged 29)	13	Wasps
Kyle Sinckler	Prop	10 March 1993 (aged 23)	4	Harlequins
Charlie Ewels	Lock	29 June 1995 (aged 21)	3	Bath
George Kruis	Lock	22 February 1990 (aged 26)	20	Saracens
Joe Launchbury	Lock	12 April 1991 (aged 25)	37	Wasps
Courtney Lawes	Lock	23 February 1989 (aged 27)	53	Northampton Saints
Maro Itoje	Lock	28 October 1994 (aged 22)	7	Saracens
Jack Clifford (rugby)	Flanker	12 February 1993 (aged 23)	8	Harlequins
Teimana Harrison	Flanker	5 September 1992 (aged 24)	5	Northampton Saints
James Haskell	Flanker	2 April 1985 (aged 31)	70	Wasps
Mike Williams	Flanker	4 November 1991 (aged 25)	0	Leicester Tigers
Tom Wood	Flanker	3 November 1986 (aged 30)	45	Northampton Saints
Nathan Hughes	Number 8	10 June 1991 (aged 25)	3	Wasps
Danny Care	Scrum-half	2 January 1987 (aged 30)	66	Harlequins
Ben Youngs	Scrum-half	5 September 1989 (aged 27)	65	Leicester Tigers
Owen Farrell	Fly-half	24 September 1991 (aged 25)	47	Saracens
George Ford	Fly-half	16 March 1993 (aged 23)	30	Bath
Alex Lozowski	Fly-half	30 June 1993 (aged 23)	0	Saracens
Elliot Daly	Centre	8 October 1992 (aged 24)	8	Wasps
Jonathan Joseph	Centre	21 May 1991 (aged 25)	29	Bath
Ben Te'o	Centre	27 January 1987 (aged 30)	3	Worcester Warriors
Jonny May	Wing	1 April 1990 (aged 26)	22	Gloucester Rugby
Jack Nowell	Wing	11 April 1993 (aged 23)	18	Exeter Chiefs
Anthony Watson	Wing	26 February 1994 (aged 22)	24	Bath
Marland Yarde	Wing	20 April 1992 (aged 24)	11	Harlequins
Mike Brown	Fullback	4 September 1985 (aged 31)	55	Harlequins

=== Call-ups ===
On 20 February, Mako Vunipola returned to the squad following injury while Henry Slade was an addition to the team ahead of Italy.

On 28 February, Paul Hill was an addition to the training squad during the week off between Rounds 3 and 4.

On 7 March, Billy Vunipola returned to the squad following injury.

Player	Position	Date of birth (age)	Caps	Club/province
Paul Hill	Prop	2 March 1995 (aged 21)	5	Northampton Saints
Mako Vunipola	Prop	13 January 1991 (aged 26)	39	Saracens
Billy Vunipola	Number 8	3 November 1992 (aged 24)	32	Saracens
Henry Slade	Centre	19 March 1993 (aged 23)	4	Exeter Chiefs

== France ==
On 18 January 2017, Novès called up a 32-man squad in preparation for the tournament.

Head coach: (France) Guy Novès

Player	Position	Date of birth (age)	Caps	Club/province
Camille Chat	Hooker	18 December 1995 (aged 21)	7	(France) Racing 92
Guilhem Guirado (c)	Hooker	17 June 1986 (age 39)	46	(France) Toulon
Clément Maynadier	Hooker	11 October 1988 (aged 28)	2	(France) Bordeaux
Uini Atonio	Prop	26 March 1990 (aged 26)	20	(France) La Rochelle
Cyril Baille	Prop	15 September 1993 (aged 23)	3	(France) Toulouse
Eddy Ben Arous	Prop	25 August 1990 (aged 26)	14	(France) Racing 92
Mohamed Boughanmi	Prop	27 October 1991 (aged 25)	0	(France) La Rochelle
Rabah Slimani	Prop	18 October 1989 (aged 27)	31	(France) Stade Français
Arthur Iturria	Lock	13 May 1994 (aged 22)	0	(France) Clermont Auvergne
Julien Le Devedec	Lock	4 June 1986 (aged 30)	5	(France) Brive
Yoann Maestri	Lock	14 January 1988 (aged 29)	51	(France) Toulouse
Sébastien Vahaamahina	Lock	21 October 1991 (aged 25)	21	(France) Clermont Auvergne
Loann Goujon	Flanker	23 April 1989 (aged 27)	13	(France) Bordeaux Bègles
Kevin Gourdon	Flanker	23 January 1990 (aged 27)	5	(France) La Rochelle
Raphaël Lakafia	Flanker	28 October 1988 (aged 28)	4	(France) Stade Français
Fabien Sanconnie	Flanker	21 February 1995 (aged 21)	0	(France) Brive
Damien Chouly	Number 8	27 November 1985 (aged 31)	43	(France) Clermont Auvergne
Louis Picamoles	Number 8	5 February 1986 (aged 30)	57	(England) Northampton Saints
Maxime Machenaud	Scrum-half	30 December 1988 (aged 28)	26	(France) Racing 92
Baptiste Serin	Scrum-half	20 June 1994 (aged 22)	5	(France) Bordeaux Bègles
Jean-Marc Doussain	Fly-half	12 February 1991 (aged 25)	14	(France) Toulouse
Camille Lopez	Fly-half	3 April 1989 (aged 27)	11	(France) Clermont Auvergne
Gaël Fickou	Centre	26 March 1994 (aged 22)	24	(France) Toulouse
Wesley Fofana	Centre	20 January 1988 (aged 29)	44	(France) Clermont Auvergne
Rémi Lamerat	Centre	14 January 1990 (aged 27)	11	(France) Clermont Auvergne
Djibril Camara	Wing	22 June 1989 (aged 27)	3	(France) Stade Français
Yann David	Wing	15 April 1988 (aged 28)	4	(France) Toulouse
Yoann Huget	Wing	2 June 1987 (aged 29)	42	(France) Toulouse
Noa Nakaitaci	Wing	11 July 1990 (aged 26)	10	(France) Clermont Auvergne
Virimi Vakatawa	Wing	1 May 1992 (aged 24)	8	(France) FFR
Geoffrey Palis	Fullback	8 July 1991 (aged 25)	0	(France) Castres
Scott Spedding	Fullback	4 May 1986 (aged 30)	18	(France) Clermont Auvergne

=== Call-ups ===
On 22 January, Henry Chavancy was called up to the squad as an injury replacement for Wesley Fofana.

On 23 January, Mathieu Bastareaud and Xavier Chiocci were called up as injury cover following injuries to Henry Chavancy and Eddy Ben Arous.

On 24 January, Christopher Tolofua was called up to the squad as an injury replacement for Camille Chat. Raphaël Lakafia also withdrew from the squad but was not replaced.

On 5 February, Gabriel Lacroix was called up to the squad to replace the injured Yann David.

On 20 February, Brice Dulin, Paul Jedrasiak, Bernard Le Roux and Charles Ollivon were called up to the squad.

On 5 March, Jonathan Danty and François Trinh-Duc were called up to the squad ahead of the round 4 clash with Italy.

On 9 March, Antoine Dupont was a late call up to the squad following an injury to Maxime Machenaud in training.

Player	Position	Date of birth (age)	Caps	Club/province
Christopher Tolofua	Hooker	31 December 1993 (aged 23)	4	(France) Toulouse
Xavier Chiocci	Prop	13 February 1990 (aged 26)	7	(France) Toulon
Paul Jedrasiak	Lock	6 February 1993 (aged 23)	5	(France) Clermont Auvergne
Bernard Le Roux	Flanker	4 June 1989 (aged 27)	24	(France) Racing 92
Charles Ollivon	Flanker	11 May 1993 (aged 23)	5	(France) Toulon
Antoine Dupont	Scrum-half	15 November 1996 (aged 20)	0	(France) Castres
François Trinh-Duc	Fly-half	11 November 1986 (aged 30)	56	(France) Toulon
Mathieu Bastareaud	Centre	17 September 1988 (aged 28)	39	(France) Toulon
Henry Chavancy	Centre	22 May 1988 (aged 28)	0	(France) Racing 92
Jonathan Danty	Centre	7 October 1992 (aged 24)	4	(France) Stade Français
Gabriel Lacroix	Wing	10 October 1993 (aged 23)	0	(France) La Rochelle
Brice Dulin	Fullback	13 April 1990 (aged 26)	25	(France) Racing 92

== Ireland ==
On 23 January 2017, Joe Schmidt named a 40-man squad for the opening two rounds of the championship.

Head coach: (New Zealand) Joe Schmidt

Player	Position	Date of birth (age)	Caps	Club/province
Rory Best (c)	Hooker	15 August 1982 (aged 34)	100	(Ireland) Ulster
Niall Scannell	Hooker	8 April 1992 (aged 24)	0	(Ireland) Munster
James Tracy	Hooker	2 April 1991 (aged 25)	1	(Ireland) Leinster
Finlay Bealham	Prop	9 October 1991 (aged 25)	6	(Ireland) Connacht
Tadhg Furlong	Prop	14 November 1992 (aged 24)	11	(Ireland) Leinster
Cian Healy	Prop	7 October 1987 (aged 29)	62	(Ireland) Leinster
Dave Kilcoyne	Prop	14 December 1988 (aged 28)	17	(Ireland) Munster
Jack McGrath	Prop	11 October 1989 (aged 27)	36	(Ireland) Leinster
John Ryan	Prop	2 August 1988 (aged 28)	1	(Ireland) Munster
Ultan Dillane	Lock	9 November 1993 (aged 23)	8	(Ireland) Connacht
Iain Henderson	Lock	21 February 1992 (aged 24)	28	(Ireland) Ulster
Billy Holland	Lock	3 August 1985 (aged 31)	1	(Ireland) Munster
Donnacha Ryan	Lock	11 December 1983 (aged 33)	43	(Ireland) Munster
Devin Toner	Lock	29 June 1986 (aged 30)	42	(Ireland) Leinster
Jack Conan	Flanker	29 July 1992 (aged 24)	1	(Ireland) Leinster
Dan Leavy	Flanker	23 May 1994 (aged 22)	1	(Ireland) Leinster
Seán O'Brien	Flanker	14 February 1987 (aged 29)	44	(Ireland) Leinster
Tommy O'Donnell	Flanker	21 June 1987 (aged 29)	12	(Ireland) Munster
Peter O'Mahony	Flanker	17 September 1989 (aged 27)	37	(Ireland) Munster
CJ Stander	Flanker	5 April 1990 (aged 26)	10	(Ireland) Munster
Josh van der Flier	Flanker	25 April 1993 (aged 23)	5	(Ireland) Leinster
Jamie Heaslip	Number 8	15 December 1983 (aged 33)	91	(Ireland) Leinster
Kieran Marmion	Scrum-half	11 February 1992 (aged 24)	9	(Ireland) Connacht
Luke McGrath	Scrum-half	3 February 1993 (aged 24)	1	(Ireland) Leinster
Conor Murray	Scrum-half	20 April 1989 (aged 27)	53	(Ireland) Munster
Paddy Jackson	Fly-half	5 January 1992 (aged 25)	19	(Ireland) Ulster
Johnny Sexton	Fly-half	11 July 1985 (aged 31)	63	(Ireland) Leinster
Robbie Henshaw	Centre	12 June 1993 (aged 23)	24	(Ireland) Leinster
Luke Marshall	Centre	3 March 1991 (aged 25)	9	(Ireland) Ulster
Stuart McCloskey	Centre	6 August 1992 (aged 24)	1	(Ireland) Ulster
Garry Ringrose	Centre	26 January 1995 (aged 22)	3	(Ireland) Leinster
Rory Scannell	Centre	22 December 1993 (aged 23)	0	(Ireland) Munster
Tommy Bowe	Wing	22 February 1984 (aged 32)	67	(Ireland) Ulster
Andrew Conway	Wing	11 July 1991 (aged 25)	0	(Ireland) Munster
Keith Earls	Wing	2 October 1987 (aged 29)	54	(Ireland) Munster
Craig Gilroy	Wing	11 March 1991 (aged 25)	9	(Ireland) Ulster
Andrew Trimble	Wing	20 October 1984 (aged 32)	69	(Ireland) Ulster
Simon Zebo	Wing	16 March 1990 (aged 26)	28	(Ireland) Munster
Rob Kearney	Fullback	26 March 1986 (aged 30)	72	(Ireland) Leinster
Tiernan O'Halloran	Fullback	26 February 1991 (aged 25)	3	(Ireland) Connacht

=== Call-ups ===
On 31 January, Ian Keatley was called up to the squad as injury cover for Johnny Sexton who was ruled out of the opening round of the Championship.

On 19 February, Quinn Roux was named in an extended squad ahead of the third round clash against France.

Player	Position	Date of birth (age)	Caps	Club/province
Quinn Roux	Lock	30 October 1990 (aged 26)	1	(Ireland) Connacht
Ian Keatley	Fly-half	1 April 1987 (aged 29)	4	(Ireland) Munster

== Italy ==
On 13 January 2017, head coach Conor O'Shea named a 32-man squad.

Head coach: (Ireland) Conor O'Shea

Player	Position	Date of birth (age)	Caps	Club/province
Tommaso D'Apice	Hooker	30 June 1988 (aged 28)	11	(Italy) Zebre
Ornel Gega	Hooker	24 March 1990 (aged 26)	8	(Italy) Benetton Treviso
Leonardo Ghiraldini	Hooker	26 December 1984 (aged 32)	82	(France) Toulouse
Pietro Ceccarelli	Prop	16 February 1992 (aged 24)	5	(Italy) Zebre
Dario Chistolini	Prop	14 September 1988 (aged 28)	15	(Italy) Zebre
Lorenzo Cittadini	Prop	17 December 1982 (aged 34)	53	(France) Bayonne
Andrea Lovotti	Prop	28 July 1989 (aged 27)	9	(Italy) Zebre
Sami Panico	Prop	4 June 1993 (aged 23)	6	(Italy) Calvisano
George Biagi	Lock	4 October 1985 (aged 31)	14	(Italy) Zebre
Joshua Furno	Lock	21 October 1989 (aged 27)	36	(Italy) Zebre
Marco Fuser	Lock	9 March 1991 (aged 25)	16	(Italy) Benetton Treviso
Federico Ruzza	Lock	4 August 1994 (aged 22)	0	(Italy) Zebre
Dries van Schalkwyk	Lock	21 December 1984 (aged 32)	8	(Italy) Zebre
Marco Barbini	Flanker	16 October 1990 (aged 26)	2	(Italy) Benetton Treviso
Simone Favaro	Flanker	7 November 1988 (aged 28)	33	(Scotland) Glasgow Warriors
Maxime Mbanda	Flanker	10 April 1993 (aged 23)	3	(Italy) Zebre
Francesco Minto	Flanker	20 May 1987 (aged 29)	31	(Italy) Benetton Treviso
Sergio Parisse (c)	Number 8	12 September 1983 (aged 33)	121	(France) Stade Français
Braam Steyn	Number 8	2 May 1992 (aged 24)	6	(Italy) Benetton Treviso
Giorgio Bronzini	Scrum-half	20 April 1990 (aged 26)	3	(Italy) Benetton Treviso
Edoardo Gori	Scrum-half	5 March 1990 (aged 26)	56	(Italy) Benetton Treviso
Marcello Violi	Scrum-half	11 October 1993 (aged 23)	2	(Italy) Zebre
Tommaso Allan	Fly-half	26 April 1993 (aged 23)	27	(Italy) Benetton Treviso
Carlo Canna	Fly-half	25 August 1992 (aged 24)	15	(Italy) Zebre
Tommaso Benvenuti	Centre	12 December 1990 (aged 26)	37	(Italy) Benetton Treviso
Tommaso Boni	Centre	15 January 1993 (aged 24)	2	(Italy) Zebre
Michele Campagnaro	Centre	13 March 1993 (aged 23)	25	(England) Exeter Chiefs
Luke McLean	Centre	29 June 1987 (aged 29)	84	(Italy) Benetton Treviso
Giulio Bisegni	Wing	4 April 1992 (aged 24)	5	(Italy) Zebre
Angelo Esposito	Wing	14 June 1993 (aged 23)	8	(Italy) Benetton Treviso
Giovanbattista Venditti	Wing	27 March 1990 (aged 26)	38	(Italy) Zebre
Edoardo Padovani	Fullback	15 May 1993 (aged 23)	6	(Italy) Zebre

=== Call-ups ===
On 22 February, Michele Rizzo was named in the team to face England in round 3.

On 1 March, uncapped duo Luca Sperandio and Matteo Minozzi were called up to the squad, with Minozzi providing cover for Tommaso Allan.

Player	Position	Date of birth (age)	Caps	Club/province
Michele Rizzo	Prop	16 September 1982 (aged 34)	22	(England) Leicester Tigers
Matteo Minozzi	Fly-half	4 June 1996 (aged 20)	0	(Italy) Calvisano
Luca Sperandio	Fullback	28 January 1996 (aged 21)	0	(Italy) Benetton Treviso

== Scotland ==
On 18 January, Vern Cotter named a 37-man squad ahead of the tournament.

Head coach: (New Zealand) Vern Cotter

Player	Position	Date of birth (age)	Caps	Club/province
Fraser Brown	Hooker	20 June 1989 (aged 27)	20	(Scotland) Glasgow Warriors
Ross Ford	Hooker	23 April 1984 (aged 32)	102	(Scotland) Edinburgh
Stuart McInally	Hooker	9 August 1990 (aged 26)	9	(Scotland) Edinburgh
Alex Allan	Prop	28 February 1992 (aged 24)	3	(Scotland) Glasgow Warriors
Simon Berghan	Prop	12 July 1990 (aged 26)	0	(Scotland) Edinburgh
Allan Dell	Prop	16 March 1992 (aged 24)	3	(Scotland) Edinburgh
Zander Fagerson	Prop	19 January 1996 (aged 21)	4	(Scotland) Glasgow Warriors
WP Nel	Prop	30 April 1986 (aged 30)	15	(Scotland) Edinburgh
Gordon Reid	Prop	4 March 1987 (aged 29)	19	(Scotland) Glasgow Warriors
Jon Welsh	Prop	13 October 1986 (aged 30)	11	(England) Newcastle Falcons
Jonny Gray	Lock	14 March 1994 (aged 22)	28	(Scotland) Glasgow Warriors
Richie Gray	Lock	24 August 1989 (aged 27)	60	(France) Toulouse
Grant Gilchrist	Lock	9 August 1990 (aged 26)	15	(Scotland) Edinburgh
Tim Swinson	Lock	17 February 1987 (aged 29)	25	(Scotland) Glasgow Warriors
Ben Toolis	Lock	31 March 1992 (aged 24)	1	(Scotland) Edinburgh
John Barclay	Flanker	24 September 1986 (aged 30)	55	(Wales) Scarlets
Cornell du Preez	Flanker	23 March 1991 (aged 25)	0	(Scotland) Edinburgh
John Hardie	Flanker	27 July 1988 (aged 28)	13	(Scotland) Edinburgh
Rob Harley	Flanker	26 May 1990 (aged 26)	19	(Scotland) Glasgow Warriors
Hamish Watson	Flanker	15 October 1991 (aged 25)	5	(Scotland) Edinburgh
Ryan Wilson	Number 8	18 May 1989 (aged 27)	23	(Scotland) Glasgow Warriors
Josh Strauss	Number 8	23 October 1986 (aged 30)	9	(Scotland) Glasgow Warriors
Greig Laidlaw (c)	Scrum-half	12 October 1985 (aged 31)	56	(England) Gloucester
Ali Price	Scrum-half	12 May 1993 (aged 23)	1	(Scotland) Glasgow Warriors
Henry Pyrgos	Scrum-half	9 July 1989 (aged 27)	18	(Scotland) Glasgow Warriors
Finn Russell	Fly-half	23 September 1992 (aged 24)	22	(Scotland) Glasgow Warriors
Duncan Weir	Fly-half	10 May 1991 (aged 25)	23	(Scotland) Edinburgh
Mark Bennett	Centre	3 March 1993 (aged 23)	17	(Scotland) Glasgow Warriors
Alex Dunbar	Centre	23 April 1990 (aged 26)	19	(Scotland) Glasgow Warriors
Huw Jones	Centre	17 December 1993 (aged 23)	3	(South Africa) Stormers
Matt Scott	Centre	30 September 1990 (aged 26)	36	(England) Gloucester
Duncan Taylor	Centre	5 September 1989 (aged 27)	18	(England) Saracens
Damien Hoyland	Wing	11 January 1994 (aged 23)	2	(Scotland) Edinburgh
Sean Maitland	Wing	14 September 1988 (aged 28)	26	(England) Saracens
Tommy Seymour	Wing	1 July 1988 (aged 28)	31	(Scotland) Glasgow Warriors
Tim Visser	Wing	29 May 1987 (aged 29)	28	(England) Harlequins
Stuart Hogg	Fullback	24 June 1992 (aged 24)	48	(Scotland) Glasgow Warriors

== Wales ==
On 17 January 2017, caretaker head coach Rob Howley named a 36-man squad.

Head coach: (Wales) Rob Howley (caretaker)

Player	Position	Date of birth (age)	Caps	Club/province
Scott Baldwin	Hooker	12 July 1988 (aged 28)	28	(Wales) Ospreys
Kristian Dacey	Hooker	25 July 1989 (aged 27)	3	(Wales) Cardiff Blues
Ken Owens	Hooker	3 January 1987 (aged 30)	45	(Wales) Scarlets
Scott Andrews	Prop	1 August 1989 (aged 27)	13	(Wales) Cardiff Blues
Rob Evans	Prop	14 April 1992 (aged 24)	12	(Wales) Scarlets
Tomas Francis	Prop	27 April 1992 (aged 24)	17	(England) Exeter Chiefs
Rhodri Jones	Prop	23 December 1991 (aged 25)	14	(Wales) Ospreys
Samson Lee	Prop	30 November 1992 (aged 24)	29	(Wales) Scarlets
Nicky Smith	Prop	7 April 1994 (aged 22)	7	(Wales) Ospreys
Jake Ball	Lock	21 June 1991 (aged 25)	21	(Wales) Scarlets
Luke Charteris	Lock	9 March 1983 (aged 33)	71	(England) Bath
Cory Hill	Lock	10 February 1992 (aged 24)	3	(Wales) Newport Gwent Dragons
Alun Wyn Jones (c)	Lock	19 September 1985 (aged 31)	105	(Wales) Ospreys
Rory Thornton	Lock	16 March 1995 (aged 21)	0	(Wales) Ospreys
Olly Cracknell	Flanker	26 May 1994 (aged 22)	0	(Wales) Ospreys
James King	Flanker	24 July 1990 (aged 26)	10	(Wales) Ospreys
Ross Moriarty	Flanker	18 April 1994 (aged 22)	12	(England) Gloucester
Justin Tipuric	Flanker	6 August 1989 (aged 27)	46	(Wales) Ospreys
Sam Warburton	Flanker	5 October 1988 (aged 28)	69	(Wales) Cardiff Blues
Thomas Young	Flanker	18 May 1992 (aged 24)	0	(England) Wasps
Taulupe Faletau	Number 8	12 November 1990 (aged 26)	62	(England) Bath
Aled Davies	Scrum-half	19 July 1992 (aged 24)	0	(Wales) Scarlets
Gareth Davies	Scrum-half	18 August 1990 (aged 26)	21	(Wales) Scarlets
Rhys Webb	Scrum-half	9 December 1988 (aged 28)	23	(Wales) Ospreys
Dan Biggar	Fly-half	16 October 1989 (aged 27)	51	(Wales) Ospreys
Sam Davies	Fly-half	6 October 1993 (aged 23)	3	(Wales) Ospreys
Owen Williams	Fly-half	27 February 1992 (aged 24)	0	(England) Leicester Tigers
Jonathan Davies	Centre	5 April 1988 (aged 28)	59	(Wales) Scarlets
Jamie Roberts	Centre	8 November 1986 (aged 30)	86	(England) Harlequins
Scott Williams	Centre	10 October 1990 (aged 26)	41	(Wales) Scarlets
Alex Cuthbert	Wing	5 April 1990 (aged 26)	44	(Wales) Cardiff Blues
Steff Evans	Wing	1 September 1994 (aged 22)	0	(Wales) Scarlets
Ashton Hewitt	Wing	20 November 1994 (aged 22)	0	(Wales) Newport Gwent Dragons
George North	Wing	13 April 1992 (aged 24)	65	(England) Northampton Saints
Leigh Halfpenny	Fullback	22 December 1988 (aged 28)	66	(France) Toulon
Liam Williams	Fullback	9 April 1991 (aged 25)	38	(Wales) Scarlets
