= 2017 Six Nations Championship =

Rugby union competition in Europe

- Date: 4 February – 18 March 2017
- Countries: England; France; Ireland; Italy; Scotland; Wales

Tournament statistics
- Champions: England (28th title)
- Matches played: 15
- Attendance: 996,662 (66,444 per match)
- Tries scored: 66 (4.4 per match)
- Top point scorer: (France) Camille Lopez (67)
- Top try scorers: Eight players: (England) Danny Care (3); (Ireland) Keith Earls (3); (Ireland) Craig Gilroy (3); (Scotland) Stuart Hogg (3); (England) Jonathan Joseph (3); (Wales) George North (3); (Ireland) CJ Stander (3); (Wales) Liam Williams (3)
- Player of the tournament: (Scotland) Stuart Hogg
- Official website: Six Nations Website

The 2017 Six Nations Championship was the 18th series of the Six Nations Championship, the annual northern hemisphere rugby union championship. The tournament was also known as the RBS 6 Nations because of the tournament's sponsorship by The Royal Bank of Scotland Group.

It was contested by defending champions England, France, Ireland, Italy, Scotland and Wales. Including the competition's previous iterations as the Home Nations Championship and Five Nations Championship, it was the 123rd edition of the tournament.

For the first time the 2017 tournament used the bonus point system common to most other professional rugby union tournaments. As well as the standard four points for a win and two for a draw, a team scoring four tries in a match received an additional league table point, as did a team losing by seven or fewer points. Additionally, to ensure that a team winning all of its five matches (a Grand Slam) would also win the Championship, three bonus points were to be awarded for this achievement.

For the second successive year, the championship was won by England with a round to spare. However, they were denied the Grand Slam and Triple Crown in the final game by a defeat to Ireland in the final round, the fifth time this has happened to England in the Six Nations era (2000, 2001, 2011, 2013 and 2017) and the third time at the hands of the Irish (the other two being 2001 and 2011).

== Participants ==
| Nation | Stadium | | | Head coach | Captain |
| Nation | Home stadium | Capacity | Location | Head coach | Captain |
|---|---|---|---|---|---|
| England | Twickenham Stadium | 82,000 | London | (Australia) Eddie Jones | Dylan Hartley |
| France | Stade de France | 81,338 | Saint-Denis | (France) Guy Novès | Guilhem Guirado |
| Ireland | Aviva Stadium | 51,700 | Dublin | (New Zealand) Joe Schmidt | Rory Best ^{1} |
| Italy | Stadio Olimpico | 73,261 | Rome | (Ireland) Conor O'Shea | Sergio Parisse |
| Scotland | Murrayfield Stadium | 67,144 | Edinburgh | (New Zealand) Vern Cotter | John Barclay ^{2} |
| Wales | Millennium Stadium | 74,500 | Cardiff | (Wales) Rob Howley (caretaker) | Alun Wyn Jones |

^{1} Except the round 2 match against Italy, when Best was a late withdrawal due to illness and Jamie Heaslip took over the captaincy.
^{2} Replaced original captain Greig Laidlaw, who was ruled out of the Championship after sustaining an injury during Scotland's game against France in round 2.

== Table ==
| Pos | Team | Pld | W | D | L | PF | PA | PD | T | TB | LB | Pts |
|---|---|---|---|---|---|---|---|---|---|---|---|---|
| 1 | England | 5 | 4 | 0 | 1 | 146 | 81 | +65 | 16 | 2 | 1 | 19 |
| 2 | Ireland | 5 | 3 | 0 | 2 | 126 | 77 | +49 | 14 | 1 | 1 | 14 |
| 3 | France | 5 | 3 | 0 | 2 | 107 | 90 | +17 | 8 | 1 | 1 | 14 |
| 4 | Scotland | 5 | 3 | 0 | 2 | 122 | 118 | +4 | 14 | 1 | 1 | 14 |
| 5 | Wales | 5 | 2 | 0 | 3 | 102 | 86 | +16 | 8 | 0 | 2 | 10 |
| 6 | Italy | 5 | 0 | 0 | 5 | 50 | 201 | −151 | 6 | 0 | 0 | 0 |

Source: ESPN

== Fixtures ==
=== Round 1 ===
4 February 2017
14:25 GMT (UTC+0)

| Scotland | 27–22 | Ireland (1 BP) |
| Try: Hogg (2) 8' c, 20' c Dunbar 28' c Con: Laidlaw (3/3) 9', 21', 29'; Pen: Laidlaw (2/2) 72', 80' | Report | Try: Earls 25' m Henderson 47' c Jackson 61' c Con: Jackson (2/3) 48', 62'; Pen: Jackson (1/1) 33' |

Murrayfield Stadium, Edinburgh
Attendance: 67,144
Referee: Romain Poite (France)

| FB | 15 | Stuart Hogg |
| RW | 14 | Sean Maitland |
| OC | 13 | Huw Jones | (substituted off) 59' |
| IC | 12 | Alex Dunbar |
| LW | 11 | Tommy Seymour |
| FH | 10 | Finn Russell | (substituted off) 45' | (substituted on) 51' |
| SH | 9 | Greig Laidlaw (c) |
| N8 | 8 | Josh Strauss | (substituted off) 65' |
| OF | 7 | Hamish Watson | (substituted off) 48' |
| BF | 6 | Ryan Wilson |
| RL | 5 | Jonny Gray |
| LL | 4 | Richie Gray |
| TP | 3 | Zander Fagerson |
| HK | 2 | Fraser Brown | 4' to 9' | | (substituted off) 26' |
| LP | 1 | Allan Dell | (substituted off) 55' |
Replacements:
| HK | 16 | Ross Ford | (substituted on) 4' | (substituted off) 9' | (substituted on) 26' |
| PR | 17 | Gordon Reid | (substituted on) 55' |
| PR | 18 | Simon Berghan |
| LK | 19 | Tim Swinson | (substituted on) 65' |
| FL | 20 | John Barclay | (substituted on) 48' |
| SH | 21 | Ali Price |
| FH | 22 | Duncan Weir | (substituted on) 45' | (substituted off) 51' |
| CE | 23 | Mark Bennett | (substituted on) 59' |
Coach:
(New Zealand) Vern Cotter

| FB | 15 | Rob Kearney |
| RW | 14 | Keith Earls | (substituted off) 67' |
| OC | 13 | Garry Ringrose |
| IC | 12 | Robbie Henshaw |
| LW | 11 | Simon Zebo |
| FH | 10 | Paddy Jackson |
| SH | 9 | Conor Murray |
| N8 | 8 | Jamie Heaslip |
| OF | 7 | Seán O'Brien | (substituted off) 65' |
| BF | 6 | CJ Stander |
| RL | 5 | Devin Toner |
| LL | 4 | Iain Henderson | (substituted off) 63' |
| TP | 3 | Tadhg Furlong | (substituted off) 68' |
| HK | 2 | Rory Best (c) |
| LP | 1 | Jack McGrath | (substituted off) 55' |
Replacements:
| HK | 16 | Niall Scannell |
| PR | 17 | Cian Healy | (substituted on) 55' |
| PR | 18 | John Ryan | (substituted on) 67' |
| LK | 19 | Ultan Dillane | (substituted on) 63' |
| FL | 20 | Josh van der Flier | (substituted on) 65' |
| SH | 21 | Kieran Marmion |
| FH | 22 | Ian Keatley |
| WG | 23 | Tommy Bowe | (substituted on) 68' |
Coach:
(New Zealand) Joe Schmidt

Man of the Match:
Stuart Hogg (Scotland)

Touch judges:
Jaco Peyper (South Africa)
Nick Briant (New Zealand)
Television match official:
Glenn Newman (New Zealand)

Notes:

- Scotland reclaimed the Centenary Quaich for the first time since 2013, the last time they beat Ireland.
- Scotland won their opening Six Nations match for the first time since 2006.
- Ireland lost their opening Six Nations match for the first time since 2012.
- Stuart Hogg became Scotland's highest try scorer in the Six Nations.
- Ireland received the first bonus point in the history of the Six Nations.

4 February 2017
16:50 GMT (UTC+0)

| England | 19–16 | France (1 BP) |
| Try: Te'o 70'; Con: Farrell (1/1) 71' c Pen: Farrell (3/4) 9', 22', 54'; Daly (1/1) 37' | Report | Try: Slimani 59'; Con: Lopez (1/1) 60' c Pen: Lopez (3/4) 6', 12', 19' |

Twickenham Stadium, London
Attendance: 81,902
Referee: Angus Gardner (Australia)

| FB | 15 | Mike Brown |
| RW | 14 | Jonny May | (yellow card) 12' |
| OC | 13 | Jonathan Joseph | | (substituted off) 68' |
| IC | 12 | Owen Farrell |
| LW | 11 | Elliot Daly |
| FH | 10 | George Ford | | (substituted off) 68' |
| SH | 9 | Ben Youngs | | (substituted off) 65' |
| N8 | 8 | Nathan Hughes |
| OF | 7 | Tom Wood |
| BF | 6 | Maro Itoje |
| RL | 5 | Courtney Lawes |
| LL | 4 | Joe Launchbury | | (substituted off) 63' |
| TP | 3 | Dan Cole |
| HK | 2 | Dylan Hartley (c) | | (substituted off) 54' |
| LP | 1 | Joe Marler | | (substituted off) 65' |
Replacements:
| HK | 16 | Jamie George | | (substituted on) 54' |
| PR | 17 | Matt Mullan | | (substituted on) 65' |
| PR | 18 | Kyle Sinckler |
| FL | 19 | Teimana Harrison |
| FL | 20 | James Haskell | | (substituted on) 63' |
| SH | 21 | Danny Care | | (substituted on) 65' |
| CE | 22 | Ben Te'o | | (substituted on) 68' |
| WG | 23 | Jack Nowell | | (substituted on) 68' |
Coach:
(Australia) Eddie Jones

| FB | 15 | Scott Spedding |
| RW | 14 | Noa Nakaitaci |
| OC | 13 | Rémi Lamerat | (substituted off) 71' |
| IC | 12 | Gaël Fickou |
| LW | 11 | Virimi Vakatawa |
| FH | 10 | Camille Lopez | (substituted off) 71' |
| SH | 9 | Baptiste Serin | (substituted off) 56' |
| N8 | 8 | Louis Picamoles |
| OF | 7 | Kevin Gourdon |
| BF | 6 | Damien Chouly | (substituted off) 63' |
| RL | 5 | Yoann Maestri |
| LL | 4 | Sébastien Vahaamahina | (substituted off) 71' |
| TP | 3 | Uini Atonio | (substituted off) 45' |
| HK | 2 | Guilhem Guirado (c) | (substituted off) 71' |
| LP | 1 | Cyril Baille | (substituted off) 45' |
Replacements:
| HK | 16 | Clément Maynadier | (substituted on) 71' |
| PR | 17 | Rabah Slimani | (substituted on) 45' |
| PR | 18 | Xavier Chiocci | (substituted on) 45' |
| LK | 19 | Arthur Iturria | (substituted on) 71' |
| FL | 20 | Loann Goujon | (substituted on) 63' |
| SH | 21 | Maxime Machenaud | (substituted on) 56' |
| FH | 22 | Jean-Marc Doussain | (substituted on) 71' |
| WG | 23 | Yoann Huget | (substituted on) 71' |
Coach:
(France) Guy Novès

Man of the Match:
Louis Picamoles (France)

Touch judges:
Glen Jackson (New Zealand)
Marius van der Westhuizen (South Africa)
Television match official:
Peter Fitzgibbon (Ireland)

Notes:

- Arthur Iturria (France) made his international debut.
- England won their 15th consecutive match, their longest winning run.

5 February 2017
15:00 CET (UTC+1)

| Italy | 7–33 | Wales |
| Try: Gori 28' c Con: Canna (1/1) 29' | Report | Try: J. Davies 60' c L. Williams 66' c North 77' c Con: Halfpenny (3/3) 61', 68', 78'; Pen: Halfpenny (4/5) 35', 45', 52', 55' |

Stadio Olimpico, Rome
Attendance: 40,986
Referee: JP Doyle (England)

| FB | 15 | Edoardo Padovani | | | (substituted off) 73' |
| RW | 14 | Giulio Bisegni | | (substituted off) 59' | (substituted on) 70' |
| OC | 13 | Tommaso Benvenuti | | (substituted off) 52' |
| IC | 12 | Luke McLean |
| LW | 11 | Giovanbattista Venditti |
| FH | 10 | Carlo Canna | | (substituted off) 68' | (substituted on) 73' |
| SH | 9 | Edoardo Gori | | (substituted off) 64' |
| N8 | 8 | Sergio Parisse (c) |
| OF | 7 | Maxime Mbanda |
| BF | 6 | Braam Steyn |
| RL | 5 | George Biagi | | | | (substituted off) 52' |
| LL | 4 | Marco Fuser | | (substituted off) 34' | (substituted on) 40' | (substituted off) 62' |
| TP | 3 | Lorenzo Cittadini | | (substituted off) 58' |
| HK | 2 | Ornel Gega | | (substituted off) 46' |
| LP | 1 | Andrea Lovotti | (yellow card) 59' |
Replacements:
| HK | 16 | Leonardo Ghiraldini | | (substituted on) 46' |
| PR | 17 | Sami Panico | | (substituted on) 59' | (substituted off) 70' |
| PR | 18 | Pietro Ceccarelli | | (substituted on) 58' |
| LK | 19 | Joshua Furno | | (substituted on) 34' | (substituted off) 40' | (substituted on) 52' |
| FL | 20 | Francesco Minto | | | | (substituted on) 62' |
| SH | 21 | Giorgio Bronzini | | (substituted on) 64' |
| FH | 22 | Tommaso Allan | | (substituted on) 68' |
| CE | 23 | Michele Campagnaro | | (substituted on) 52' |
Coach:
(Ireland) Conor O'Shea

| FB | 15 | Leigh Halfpenny |
| RW | 14 | George North |
| OC | 13 | Jonathan Davies |
| IC | 12 | Scott Williams | (substituted off) 73' |
| LW | 11 | Liam Williams |
| FH | 10 | Dan Biggar | (substituted off) 40' |
| SH | 9 | Rhys Webb | (substituted off) 73' |
| N8 | 8 | Ross Moriarty | (substituted off) 73' |
| OF | 7 | Justin Tipuric |
| BF | 6 | Sam Warburton |
| RL | 5 | Alun Wyn Jones (c) | (substituted off) 4' | (substituted on) 15' |
| LL | 4 | Jake Ball | | | (substituted off) 62' |
| TP | 3 | Samson Lee | (substituted off) 49' |
| HK | 2 | Ken Owens | (substituted off) 68' |
| LP | 1 | Nicky Smith | (substituted off) 49' |
Replacements:
| HK | 16 | Scott Baldwin | (substituted on) 68' |
| PR | 17 | Rob Evans | (substituted on) 49' |
| PR | 18 | Tomas Francis | (substituted on) 49' |
| LK | 19 | Cory Hill | (substituted on) 4' | (substituted off) 15' | (substituted on) 62' |
| FL | 20 | James King | (substituted on) 73' |
| SH | 21 | Gareth Davies | (substituted on) 73' |
| FH | 22 | Sam Davies | (substituted on) 40' |
| CE | 23 | Jamie Roberts | (substituted on) 73' |
Coach:
(Wales) Rob Howley

Man of the Match:
Leigh Halfpenny (Wales)

Touch judges:
John Lacey (Ireland)
Craig Maxwell-Keys (England)
Television match official:
Rowan Kitt (England)

=== Round 2 ===
11 February 2017
15:25 CET (UTC+1)

| Italy | 10–63 | Ireland (1 BP) |
| Try: Penalty try 31' c Con: Canna (1/1) 31'; Pen: Canna (1/1) 15' | Report | Try: Earls (2) 11' c, 25' c Stander (3) 17' c, 34' c, 45' c Gilroy (3) 67' c, 77' c, 80' c Ringrose 71' c Con: Jackson (9/9) 13', 19', 27', 35', 56', 68', 72', 78', 80' |

Stadio Olimpico, Rome
Attendance: 50,197
Referee: Glen Jackson (New Zealand)

| FB | 15 | Edoardo Padovani |
| RW | 14 | Angelo Esposito |
| OC | 13 | Tommaso Benvenuti | (substituted off) 48' |
| IC | 12 | Luke McLean |
| LW | 11 | Giovanbattista Venditti |
| FH | 10 | Carlo Canna | (substituted off) 70' |
| SH | 9 | Edoardo Gori | (substituted off) 60' |
| N8 | 8 | Sergio Parisse (c) |
| OF | 7 | Simone Favaro | (substituted off) 56' |
| BF | 6 | Maxime Mbanda |
| RL | 5 | Dries van Schalkwyk | (substituted off) 46' |
| LL | 4 | Marco Fuser |
| TP | 3 | Lorenzo Cittadini | (substituted off) 41' | (substituted on) 58' |
| HK | 2 | Leonardo Ghiraldini | (substituted off) 46' |
| LP | 1 | Andrea Lovotti | (substituted off) 63' |
Replacements:
| HK | 16 | Ornel Gega | (substituted on) 46' |
| PR | 17 | Sami Panico | (substituted on) 63' |
| PR | 18 | Dario Chistolini | (substituted on) 41' | (substituted off) 58' |
| LK | 19 | George Biagi | (substituted on) 46' |
| N8 | 20 | Braam Steyn | (substituted on) 56' |
| SH | 21 | Giorgio Bronzini | (substituted on) 60' |
| FH | 22 | Tommaso Allan | (substituted on) 70' |
| CE | 23 | Michele Campagnaro | (substituted on) 48' |
Coach:
(Ireland) Conor O'Shea

| FB | 15 | Rob Kearney | | (substituted off) 78' |
| RW | 14 | Keith Earls |
| OC | 13 | Garry Ringrose |
| IC | 12 | Robbie Henshaw | | (substituted off) 47' |
| LW | 11 | Simon Zebo | | (substituted off) 74' |
| FH | 10 | Paddy Jackson |
| SH | 9 | Conor Murray | | (substituted off) 68' |
| N8 | 8 | Jamie Heaslip (c) |
| OF | 7 | Seán O'Brien | | (substituted off) 68' |
| BF | 6 | CJ Stander |
| RL | 5 | Devin Toner | | (substituted off) 59' |
| LL | 4 | Donnacha Ryan | (yellow card) 31' |
| TP | 3 | Tadhg Furlong | | (substituted off) 53' |
| HK | 2 | Niall Scannell | | (substituted off) 62' |
| LP | 1 | Cian Healy | | (substituted off) 50' |
Replacements:
| HK | 16 | James Tracy | | (substituted on) 62' |
| PR | 17 | Jack McGrath | | (substituted on) 50' |
| PR | 18 | John Ryan | | (substituted on) 53' |
| LK | 19 | Ultan Dillane | | (substituted on) 59' |
| FL | 20 | Josh van der Flier | | (substituted on) 68' |
| SH | 21 | Kieran Marmion | | (substituted on) 68' |
| FH | 22 | Ian Keatley | | (substituted on) 74' |
| WG | 23 | Craig Gilroy | | (substituted on) 47' |
Coach:
(New Zealand) Joe Schmidt

Man of the Match:
CJ Stander (Ireland)

Touch judges:
Angus Gardner (Australia)
Marius van der Westhuizen (South Africa)
Television match official:
Rowan Kitt (England)

Notes:

- Niall Scannell (Ireland) made his test debut.
- Ireland captain Rory Best was named to start but was withdrawn from the team due to illness on the day of the match.
- CJ Stander became the first forward to score a hat-trick in the Six Nations.
- Ireland earned the first try bonus point in the history of the Six Nations.
- This was Ireland's largest victory in the tournament.

11 February 2017
16:50 GMT (UTC+0)

| (1 BP) Wales | 16–21 | England |
| Try: L. Williams 37' c Con: Halfpenny (1/1) 38'; Pen: Halfpenny (3/3) 2', 22', 60' | Report | Try: Youngs 17' m Daly 75' c Con: Farrell (1/2) 77'; Pen: Farrell (3/3) 10', 55', 70' |

Millennium Stadium, Cardiff
Attendance: 74,500
Referee: Jérôme Garcès (France)

| FB | 15 | Leigh Halfpenny |
| RW | 14 | Alex Cuthbert |
| OC | 13 | Jonathan Davies |
| IC | 12 | Scott Williams | (substituted off) 70' |
| LW | 11 | Liam Williams |
| FH | 10 | Dan Biggar |
| SH | 9 | Rhys Webb | (substituted off) 64' |
| N8 | 8 | Ross Moriarty | (substituted off) 52' |
| OF | 7 | Justin Tipuric | (substituted off) 77' |
| BF | 6 | Sam Warburton |
| RL | 5 | Alun Wyn Jones (c) |
| LL | 4 | Jake Ball |
| TP | 3 | Tomas Francis | (substituted off) 52' |
| HK | 2 | Ken Owens | (substituted off) 60' |
| LP | 1 | Rob Evans | (substituted off) 52' |
Replacements:
| HK | 16 | Scott Baldwin | (substituted on) 60' |
| PR | 17 | Nicky Smith | (substituted on) 52' |
| PR | 18 | Samson Lee | (substituted on) 52' |
| LK | 19 | Cory Hill | (substituted on) 77' |
| N8 | 20 | Taulupe Faletau | (substituted on) 52' |
| SH | 21 | Gareth Davies | (substituted on) 64' |
| FH | 22 | Sam Davies |
| CE | 23 | Jamie Roberts | (substituted on) 70' |
Coach:
(Wales) Rob Howley

| FB | 15 | Mike Brown |
| RW | 14 | Jack Nowell | (substituted off) 70' |
| OC | 13 | Jonathan Joseph | (substituted off) 64' |
| IC | 12 | Owen Farrell |
| LW | 11 | Elliot Daly |
| FH | 10 | George Ford |
| SH | 9 | Ben Youngs | (substituted off) 64' |
| N8 | 8 | Nathan Hughes | (substituted off) 77' |
| OF | 7 | Jack Clifford | (substituted off) 48' |
| BF | 6 | Maro Itoje |
| RL | 5 | Courtney Lawes |
| LL | 4 | Joe Launchbury |
| TP | 3 | Dan Cole | (substituted off) 70' |
| HK | 2 | Dylan Hartley (c) | (substituted off) 46' |
| LP | 1 | Joe Marler | (substituted off) 70' |
Replacements:
| HK | 16 | Jamie George | (substituted on) 46' |
| PR | 17 | Matt Mullan | (substituted on) 70' |
| PR | 18 | Kyle Sinckler | (substituted on) 70' |
| FL | 19 | Tom Wood | (substituted on) 77' |
| FL | 20 | James Haskell | (substituted on) 48' |
| SH | 21 | Danny Care | (substituted on) 64' |
| CE | 22 | Ben Te'o | (substituted on) 64' |
| WG | 23 | Jonny May | (substituted on) 70' |
Coach:
(Australia) Eddie Jones

Man of the Match:
Joe Launchbury (England)

Touch judges:
Pascal Gaüzère (France)
Nick Briant (New Zealand)
Television match official:
Glenn Newman (New Zealand)

Notes:

- George North was named to start for Wales but was replaced by Alex Cuthbert after failing to recover from injury.

12 February 2017
16:00 CET (UTC+1)

| France | 22–16 | Scotland (1 BP) |
| Try: Fickou 30' c Con: Lopez (1/1) 31'; Pen: Lopez (5/6) 6', 19', 46', 71', 76' | Report | Try: Hogg 16' m Swinson 43' m Pen: Russell (2/2) 35', 38' |

Stade de France, Paris
Attendance: 75,283
Referee: Jaco Peyper (South Africa)

| FB | 15 | Scott Spedding |
| RW | 14 | Noa Nakaitaci |
| OC | 13 | Rémi Lamerat |
| IC | 12 | Gaël Fickou |
| LW | 11 | Virimi Vakatawa | (substituted off) 52' |
| FH | 10 | Camille Lopez |
| SH | 9 | Baptiste Serin | (substituted off) 55' |
| N8 | 8 | Louis Picamoles |
| OF | 7 | Kevin Gourdon |
| BF | 6 | Loann Goujon | (substituted off) 44' | (substituted on) 47' | (substituted off) 59' |
| RL | 5 | Yoann Maestri | (substituted off) 58' |
| LL | 4 | Sébastien Vahaamahina |
| TP | 3 | Uini Atonio | (substituted off) 44' |
| HK | 2 | Guilhem Guirado (c) | (substituted off) 71' |
| LP | 1 | Cyril Baille | (substituted off) 58' |
Replacements:
| HK | 16 | Christopher Tolofua | (substituted on) 71' |
| PR | 17 | Rabah Slimani | (substituted on) 44' |
| PR | 18 | Xavier Chiocci | (substituted on) 58' |
| LK | 19 | Julien Le Devedec | (substituted on) 58' |
| N8 | 20 | Damien Chouly | (substituted on) 44' | (substituted off) 47' | (substituted on) 59' |
| SH | 21 | Maxime Machenaud | (substituted on) 55' |
| FH | 22 | Jean-Marc Doussain |
| WG | 23 | Yoann Huget | (substituted on) 52' |
Coach:
(France) Guy Novès

| FB | 15 | Stuart Hogg |
| RW | 14 | Sean Maitland |
| OC | 13 | Huw Jones |
| IC | 12 | Alex Dunbar | (substituted off) 56' | (substituted on) 61' |
| LW | 11 | Tommy Seymour |
| FH | 10 | Finn Russell | (substituted off) 74' |
| SH | 9 | Greig Laidlaw (c) | (substituted off) 24' |
| N8 | 8 | Josh Strauss |
| OF | 7 | Hamish Watson |
| BF | 6 | John Barclay | (substituted off) 35' |
| RL | 5 | Jonny Gray |
| LL | 4 | Richie Gray |
| TP | 3 | Zander Fagerson | (substituted off) 58' |
| HK | 2 | Fraser Brown | (substituted off) 66' |
| LP | 1 | Allan Dell | (substituted off) 44' |
Replacements:
| HK | 16 | Ross Ford | (substituted on) 66' |
| PR | 17 | Gordon Reid | (substituted on) 44' |
| PR | 18 | Simon Berghan | (substituted on) 58' |
| LK | 19 | Tim Swinson | | (substituted on) 41' |
| FL | 20 | John Hardie | (substituted on) 35' | (substituted off) 41' |
| SH | 21 | Ali Price | (substituted on) 24' |
| FH | 22 | Duncan Weir | (substituted on) 74' |
| CE | 23 | Mark Bennett | (substituted on) 56' | (substituted off) 61' |
Coach:
(New Zealand) Vern Cotter

Man of the Match:
Kevin Gourdon (France)

Touch judges:
John Lacey (Ireland)
Luke Pearce (England)
Television match official:
Peter Fitzgibbon (Ireland)

Notes:

- Stuart Hogg (Scotland) earned his 50th test cap.
- Simon Berghan (Scotland) made his international debut.

=== Round 3 ===
25 February 2017
14:25 GMT (UTC+0)

| Scotland | 29–13 | Wales |
| Try: Seymour 43' c Visser 66' c Con: Russell (2/2) 44', 67'; Pen: Russell (5/5) 6', 29', 40', 54', 72' | Report | Try: L. Williams 22' c Con: Halfpenny (1/1) 24'; Pen: Halfpenny (2/3) 11', 33' |

Murrayfield Stadium, Edinburgh
Attendance: 67,144
Referee: John Lacey (Ireland)

| FB | 15 | Stuart Hogg |
| RW | 14 | Tommy Seymour |
| OC | 13 | Huw Jones |
| IC | 12 | Alex Dunbar |
| LW | 11 | Tim Visser |
| FH | 10 | Finn Russell |
| SH | 9 | Ali Price | (substituted off) 54' |
| N8 | 8 | Ryan Wilson |
| OF | 7 | John Hardie | (substituted off) 24' |
| BF | 6 | John Barclay (c) |
| RL | 5 | Jonny Gray |
| LL | 4 | Richie Gray |
| TP | 3 | Zander Fagerson |
| HK | 2 | Fraser Brown | (substituted off) 70' |
| LP | 1 | Gordon Reid | (substituted off) 51' |
Replacements:
| HK | 16 | Ross Ford | (substituted on) 70' |
| PR | 17 | Allan Dell | (substituted on) 51' |
| PR | 18 | Simon Berghan |
| LK | 19 | Tim Swinson |
| FL | 20 | Hamish Watson | (substituted on) 24' |
| SH | 21 | Henry Pyrgos | (substituted on) 54' |
| FH | 22 | Duncan Weir |
| CE | 23 | Mark Bennett |
Coach:
(New Zealand) Vern Cotter

| FB | 15 | Leigh Halfpenny |
| RW | 14 | George North |
| OC | 13 | Jonathan Davies |
| IC | 12 | Scott Williams | (substituted off) 62' |
| LW | 11 | Liam Williams |
| FH | 10 | Dan Biggar | (substituted off) 68' |
| SH | 9 | Rhys Webb |
| N8 | 8 | Ross Moriarty | (substituted off) 62' |
| OF | 7 | Justin Tipuric |
| BF | 6 | Sam Warburton |
| RL | 5 | Alun Wyn Jones (c) |
| LL | 4 | Jake Ball | (substituted off) 56' |
| TP | 3 | Tomas Francis | (substituted off) 57' |
| HK | 2 | Ken Owens | (substituted off) 68' |
| LP | 1 | Rob Evans | (substituted off) 68' |
Replacements:
| HK | 16 | Scott Baldwin | (substituted on) 68' |
| PR | 17 | Nicky Smith | (substituted on) 68' |
| PR | 18 | Samson Lee | (substituted on) 57' |
| LK | 19 | Luke Charteris | (substituted on) 56' |
| N8 | 20 | Taulupe Faletau | (substituted on) 62' |
| SH | 21 | Gareth Davies |
| FH | 22 | Sam Davies | (substituted on) 68' |
| CE | 23 | Jamie Roberts | (substituted on) 62' |
Coach:
(Wales) Rob Howley

Man of the Match:
Finn Russell (Scotland)

Touch judges:
JP Doyle (England)
Matthew Carley (England)
Television match official:
Rowan Kitt (England)

Notes:

- Scotland ended a record nine-match losing streak against Wales by winning for the first time since their 21–9 victory in 2007.
- With this victory, Scotland climbed from seventh to fifth in the World Rugby Rankings, their highest position since the rankings were introduced in 2003, overtaking South Africa and Wales.

25 February 2017
16:50 GMT (UTC+0)

| Ireland | 19–9 | France |
| Try: Murray 29' c Con: Sexton (1/1) 30'; Pen: Sexton (2/2) 45', 54'; Jackson (1/1) 75'; Drop: Sexton (1/1) 49' | Report | Pen: Lopez (3/3) 11', 18', 73' |

Aviva Stadium, Dublin
Attendance: 51,700
Referee: Nigel Owens (Wales)

| FB | 15 | Rob Kearney | (substituted off) 50' |
| RW | 14 | Keith Earls |
| OC | 13 | Garry Ringrose |
| IC | 12 | Robbie Henshaw |
| LW | 11 | Simon Zebo |
| FH | 10 | Johnny Sexton | (substituted off) 68' |
| SH | 9 | Conor Murray | (substituted off) 78' |
| N8 | 8 | Jamie Heaslip |
| OF | 7 | Seán O'Brien | (substituted off) 67' |
| BF | 6 | CJ Stander |
| RL | 5 | Devin Toner |
| LL | 4 | Donnacha Ryan | (substituted off) 59' |
| TP | 3 | Tadhg Furlong | (substituted off) 73' |
| HK | 2 | Rory Best (c) | (substituted off) 67' |
| LP | 1 | Jack McGrath | (substituted off) 59' |
Replacements:
| HK | 16 | Niall Scannell | (substituted on) 67' |
| PR | 17 | Cian Healy | (substituted on) 59' |
| PR | 18 | John Ryan | (substituted on) 73' |
| LK | 19 | Iain Henderson | (substituted on) 59' |
| FL | 20 | Peter O'Mahony | (substituted on) 67' |
| SH | 21 | Kieran Marmion | (substituted on) 78' |
| FH | 22 | Paddy Jackson | (substituted on) 68' |
| WG | 23 | Andrew Trimble | (substituted on) 50' |
Coach:
(New Zealand) Joe Schmidt

| FB | 15 | Scott Spedding | (substituted off) 73' |
| RW | 14 | Yoann Huget |
| OC | 13 | Rémi Lamerat | (substituted off) 59' |
| IC | 12 | Gaël Fickou |
| LW | 11 | Noa Nakaitaci |
| FH | 10 | Camille Lopez |
| SH | 9 | Baptiste Serin | (substituted off) 61' |
| N8 | 8 | Louis Picamoles |
| OF | 7 | Kevin Gourdon |
| BF | 6 | Bernard Le Roux | (substituted off) 59' |
| RL | 5 | Yoann Maestri |
| LL | 4 | Sébastien Vahaamahina | (substituted off) 50' |
| TP | 3 | Rabah Slimani | (substituted off) 50' |
| HK | 2 | Guilhem Guirado (c) | (substituted off) 61' |
| LP | 1 | Cyril Baille | (substituted off) 50' |
Replacements:
| HK | 16 | Christopher Tolofua | (substituted on) 61' |
| PR | 17 | Uini Atonio | (substituted on) 50' |
| PR | 18 | Eddy Ben Arous | (substituted on) 50' |
| LK | 19 | Julien Le Devedec | (substituted on) 50' |
| FL | 20 | Charles Ollivon | (substituted on) 59' |
| SH | 21 | Maxime Machenaud | (substituted on) 61' |
| CE | 22 | Henry Chavancy | (substituted on) 59' |
| WG | 23 | Djibril Camara | (substituted on) 73' |
Coach:
(France) Guy Novès

Man of the Match:
Conor Murray (Ireland)

Touch judges:
Luke Pearce (England)
Dan Jones (Wales)
Television match official:
George Ayoub (Australia)

Notes:

- Henry Chavancy (France) made his international debut.

26 February 2017
15:00 GMT (UTC+0)

| (1 BP) England | 36–15 | Italy |
| Try: Cole 23' m Care 43' m Daly 46' c Nowell (2) 69' m, 79' c Te'o 72' c Con: Farrell (3/6) 47', 73', 79' | Report | Try: Venditti 39' c Campagnaro 59' m Con: Allan (1/1) 40'; Drop: Allan (1/1) 32' |

Twickenham Stadium, London
Attendance: 81,904
Referee: Romain Poite (France)

| FB | 15 | Mike Brown |
| RW | 14 | Jonny May | (substituted off) 55' |
| OC | 13 | Ben Te'o | (substituted off) 75' |
| IC | 12 | Owen Farrell |
| LW | 11 | Elliot Daly |
| FH | 10 | George Ford |
| SH | 9 | Danny Care | (substituted off) 51' |
| N8 | 8 | Nathan Hughes | (substituted off) 71' |
| OF | 7 | James Haskell | (substituted off) 71' |
| BF | 6 | Maro Itoje |
| RL | 5 | Courtney Lawes |
| LL | 4 | Joe Launchbury |
| TP | 3 | Dan Cole | (substituted off) 71' |
| HK | 2 | Dylan Hartley (c) | (substituted off) 55' |
| LP | 1 | Joe Marler | (substituted off) 55' |
Replacements:
| HK | 16 | Jamie George | (substituted on) 55' |
| PR | 17 | Mako Vunipola | (substituted on) 55' |
| PR | 18 | Kyle Sinckler | (substituted on) 71' |
| FL | 19 | Tom Wood | (substituted on) 71' |
| FL | 20 | Jack Clifford | (substituted on) 71' |
| SH | 21 | Ben Youngs | (substituted on) 51' |
| CE | 22 | Henry Slade | (substituted on) 75' |
| WG | 23 | Jack Nowell | (substituted on) 55' |
Coach:
(Australia) Eddie Jones

| FB | 15 | Edoardo Padovani |
| RW | 14 | Giulio Bisegni | (substituted off) 51' |
| OC | 13 | Michele Campagnaro |
| IC | 12 | Luke McLean |
| LW | 11 | Giovanbattista Venditti |
| FH | 10 | Tommaso Allan | (substituted off) 61' |
| SH | 9 | Edoardo Gori | (substituted off) 35' |
| N8 | 8 | Sergio Parisse (c) |
| OF | 7 | Simone Favaro | (substituted off) 57' |
| BF | 6 | Braam Steyn |
| RL | 5 | Dries van Schalkwyk |
| LL | 4 | Marco Fuser | (substituted off) 74' |
| TP | 3 | Lorenzo Cittadini | (substituted off) 51' |
| HK | 2 | Ornel Gega | (substituted off) 74' |
| LP | 1 | Andrea Lovotti | (substituted off) 57' |
Replacements:
| HK | 16 | Tommaso D'Apice | (substituted on) 74' |
| PR | 17 | Michele Rizzo | (substituted on) 57' |
| PR | 18 | Pietro Ceccarelli | (substituted on) 51' |
| LK | 19 | George Biagi | (substituted on) 74' |
| FL | 20 | Maxime Mbanda | (substituted on) 57' |
| SH | 21 | Giorgio Bronzini | (substituted on) 35' |
| FH | 22 | Carlo Canna | (substituted on) 61' |
| CE | 23 | Tommaso Benvenuti | (substituted on) 51' |
Coach:
(Ireland) Conor O'Shea

Man of the Match:
Joe Launchbury (England)

Touch judges:
Mathieu Raynal (France)
Andrew Brace (Ireland)
Television match official:
George Ayoub (Australia)

Notes:

- Leonardo Ghiraldini was named in Italy's starting XV, but was ruled out before kick-off due to injury.
- Owen Farrell (England) earned his 50th cap.
- Michele Campagnaro scored Italy's 900th try in tests.
- Italy made the unorthodox tactical decision not to commit any players to rucks after tacking an English ball carrier. Under the laws at the time, this meant that no offside line formed and the Italians were free to position themselves among the English formation, threatening interceptions. In reaction, the rules regarding rucks were changed later that year.

=== Round 4 ===
10 March 2017
20:05 GMT (UTC+0)

| Wales | 22–9 | Ireland |
| Try: North (2) 19' m, 43' c Roberts 77' c Con: Halfpenny (2/3) 45', 78'; Pen: Halfpenny (1/1) 38' | Report | Pen: Sexton (2/2) 6', 56'; Jackson (1/1) 26' |

Millennium Stadium, Cardiff
Attendance: 74,500
Referee: Wayne Barnes (England)

| FB | 15 | Leigh Halfpenny |
| RW | 14 | George North |
| OC | 13 | Jonathan Davies |
| IC | 12 | Scott Williams | (substituted off) 66' |
| LW | 11 | Liam Williams |
| FH | 10 | Dan Biggar | (substituted off) 79' |
| SH | 9 | Rhys Webb | (substituted off) 66' |
| N8 | 8 | Ross Moriarty | (substituted off) 66' |
| OF | 7 | Justin Tipuric |
| BF | 6 | Sam Warburton |
| RL | 5 | Alun Wyn Jones (c) |
| LL | 4 | Jake Ball | (substituted off) 62' |
| TP | 3 | Tomas Francis | (substituted off) 69' |
| HK | 2 | Ken Owens | (substituted off) 71' |
| LP | 1 | Rob Evans | (substituted off) 66' |
Replacements:
| HK | 16 | Scott Baldwin | (substituted on) 71' |
| PR | 17 | Nicky Smith | (substituted on) 66' |
| PR | 18 | Samson Lee | (substituted on) 69' |
| LK | 19 | Luke Charteris | (substituted on) 62' |
| N8 | 20 | Taulupe Faletau | (substituted on) 66' |
| SH | 21 | Gareth Davies | (substituted on) 66' |
| FH | 22 | Sam Davies | (substituted on) 79' |
| CE | 23 | Jamie Roberts | (substituted on) 66' |
Coach:
(Wales) Rob Howley

| FB | 15 | Rob Kearney | | (substituted off) 79' |
| RW | 14 | Keith Earls |
| OC | 13 | Garry Ringrose |
| IC | 12 | Robbie Henshaw |
| LW | 11 | Simon Zebo |
| FH | 10 | Johnny Sexton | (yellow card) 37' | (substituted off) 18' | (substituted on) 26' | (substituted off) 79' |
| SH | 9 | Conor Murray | | (substituted off) 45' |
| N8 | 8 | Jamie Heaslip |
| OF | 7 | Seán O'Brien |
| BF | 6 | CJ Stander | | (substituted off) 62' |
| RL | 5 | Devin Toner | | (substituted off) 62' |
| LL | 4 | Donnacha Ryan |
| TP | 3 | Tadhg Furlong | | (substituted off) 79' |
| HK | 2 | Rory Best (c) | | (substituted off) 79' |
| LP | 1 | Jack McGrath | | (substituted off) 58' |
Replacements:
| HK | 16 | Niall Scannell | | (substituted on) 79' |
| PR | 17 | Cian Healy | | (substituted on) 58' |
| PR | 18 | John Ryan | | (substituted on) 79' |
| LK | 19 | Iain Henderson | | (substituted on) 62' |
| FL | 20 | Peter O'Mahony | | (substituted on) 62' |
| SH | 21 | Kieran Marmion | | (substituted on) 45' |
| FH | 22 | Paddy Jackson | | (substituted on) 18' | (substituted off) 26' | (substituted on) 79' |
| WG | 23 | Tommy Bowe | | (substituted on) 79' |
Coach:
(New Zealand) Joe Schmidt

Man of the Match:
Rhys Webb (Wales)

Touch judges:
Jérôme Garcès (France)
Matthew Carley (England)
Television match official:
Ben Skeen (New Zealand)

Notes:

- Justin Tipuric (Wales) earned his 50th test cap.

11 March 2017
14:30 CET (UTC+1)

| Italy | 18–40 | France (1 BP) |
| Try: Parisse 2' m Esposito 80' c Con: Canna (1/2) 80'; Pen: Canna (2/2) 16', 27' | Report | Try: Fickou 20' c Vakatawa 47' c Picamoles 66' c Dulin 76' c Con: Lopez (4/4) 21', 48', 71', 77'; Pen: Lopez (4/4) 8', 18', 33', 42' |

Stadio Olimpico, Rome
Attendance: 51,770
Referee: Ben O'Keeffe (New Zealand)

| FB | 15 | Edoardo Padovani | (substituted off) 72' |
| RW | 14 | Angelo Esposito |
| OC | 13 | Michele Campagnaro | (substituted off) 64' |
| IC | 12 | Luke McLean |
| LW | 11 | Giovanbattista Venditti |
| FH | 10 | Carlo Canna |
| SH | 9 | Edoardo Gori | (substituted off) 50' |
| N8 | 8 | Sergio Parisse (c) |
| OF | 7 | Simone Favaro | (substituted off) 50' |
| BF | 6 | Braam Steyn |
| RL | 5 | Dries van Schalkwyk |
| LL | 4 | Marco Fuser | (substituted off) 56' |
| TP | 3 | Lorenzo Cittadini | (substituted off) 40' |
| HK | 2 | Leonardo Ghiraldini | (substituted off) 61' |
| LP | 1 | Andrea Lovotti | (substituted off) 66' |
Replacements:
| HK | 16 | Tommaso D'Apice | (substituted on) 61' |
| PR | 17 | Sami Panico | (substituted on) 66' |
| PR | 18 | Dario Chistolini | (substituted on) 40' |
| LK | 19 | George Biagi | (substituted on) 56' |
| FL | 20 | Maxime Mbanda | (substituted on) 50' |
| SH | 21 | Giorgio Bronzini | (substituted on) 50' |
| CE | 22 | Tommaso Benvenuti | (substituted on) 64' |
| WG | 23 | Luca Sperandio | (substituted on) 72' |
Coach:
(Ireland) Conor O'Shea

| FB | 15 | Brice Dulin |
| RW | 14 | Noa Nakaitaci |
| OC | 13 | Rémi Lamerat | (substituted off) 69' |
| IC | 12 | Gaël Fickou |
| LW | 11 | Virimi Vakatawa | (substituted off) 63' |
| FH | 10 | Camille Lopez |
| SH | 9 | Baptiste Serin | (substituted off) 72' |
| N8 | 8 | Louis Picamoles | (substituted off) 72' |
| OF | 7 | Kevin Gourdon |
| BF | 6 | Fabien Sanconnie |
| RL | 5 | Yoann Maestri |
| LL | 4 | Julien Le Devedec | (substituted off) 58' |
| TP | 3 | Rabah Slimani | (substituted off) 53' |
| HK | 2 | Guilhem Guirado (c) | (substituted off) 54' |
| LP | 1 | Cyril Baille | (substituted off) 53' |
Replacements:
| HK | 16 | Christopher Tolofua | (substituted on) 54' |
| PR | 17 | Uini Atonio | (substituted on) 53' |
| PR | 18 | Eddy Ben Arous | (substituted on) 53' |
| LK | 19 | Paul Jedrasiak | (substituted on) 58' |
| FL | 20 | Bernard Le Roux | (substituted on) 72' |
| SH | 21 | Antoine Dupont | (substituted on) 72' |
| FH | 22 | François Trinh-Duc | (substituted on) 69' |
| WG | 23 | Yoann Huget | (substituted on) 63' |
Coach:
(France) Guy Novès

Man of the Match:
Baptiste Serin (France)

Touch judges:
Nigel Owens (Wales)
JP Doyle (England)
Television match official:
Marius Jonker (South Africa)

Notes:

- Luca Sperandio (Italy) and Antoine Dupont and Fabien Sanconnie (both France) made their international debuts.
- Guilhem Guirado (France) earned his 50th test cap.
- France retained the Giuseppe Garibaldi Trophy.
- France's win also guaranteed Italy would win the "wooden spoon" for coming last.

11 March 2017
16:00 GMT (UTC+0)

| (1 BP) England | 61–21 | Scotland |
| Try: Joseph (3) 2' c, 24' c, 42' c Watson 34' c B. Vunipola 56' c Care (2) 71' c, 80' c Con: Farrell (7/7) 3', 24', 36', 43', 57', 72', 80'; Pen: Farrell (4/5) 6', 14', 31', 46' | Report | Try: Reid 28' c Jones (2) 49' c, 68' c Con: Russell (3/3) 29', 50', 69' |

Twickenham Stadium, London
Attendance: 82,100
Referee: Mathieu Raynal (France)

| FB | 15 | Mike Brown |
| RW | 14 | Jack Nowell |
| OC | 13 | Jonathan Joseph | (substituted off) 57' |
| IC | 12 | Owen Farrell |
| LW | 11 | Elliot Daly | (substituted off) 1' | (substituted on) 9' | (substituted off) 15' |
| FH | 10 | George Ford |
| SH | 9 | Ben Youngs | (substituted off) 60' |
| N8 | 8 | Nathan Hughes | (substituted off) 51' |
| OF | 7 | James Haskell |
| BF | 6 | Maro Itoje |
| RL | 5 | Courtney Lawes | (substituted off) 66' |
| LL | 4 | Joe Launchbury |
| TP | 3 | Dan Cole | (substituted off) 60' |
| HK | 2 | Dylan Hartley (c) | (substituted off) 51' | (substituted on) 61' | (substituted off) 70' |
| LP | 1 | Joe Marler | (substituted off) 57' |
Replacements:
| HK | 16 | Jamie George | (substituted on) 51' | (substituted off) 61' | (substituted on) 70' |
| PR | 17 | Mako Vunipola | (substituted on) 57' |
| PR | 18 | Kyle Sinckler | (substituted on) 60' |
| FL | 19 | Tom Wood | (substituted on) 66' |
| N8 | 20 | Billy Vunipola | (substituted on) 51' |
| SH | 21 | Danny Care | (substituted on) 60' |
| CE | 22 | Ben Te'o | (substituted on) 57' |
| WG | 23 | Anthony Watson | (substituted on) 1' | (substituted off) 9' | (substituted on) 15' |
Coach:
(Australia) Eddie Jones

| FB | 15 | Stuart Hogg | | (substituted off) 17' |
| RW | 14 | Tommy Seymour | | (substituted off) 44' |
| OC | 13 | Huw Jones |
| IC | 12 | Alex Dunbar |
| LW | 11 | Tim Visser |
| FH | 10 | Finn Russell |
| SH | 9 | Ali Price |
| N8 | 8 | Ryan Wilson | | (substituted off) 61' |
| OF | 7 | Hamish Watson |
| BF | 6 | John Barclay (c) |
| RL | 5 | Jonny Gray | | (substituted off) 74' |
| LL | 4 | Richie Gray |
| TP | 3 | Zander Fagerson | | (substituted off) 60' |
| HK | 2 | Fraser Brown | (yellow card) 1' | (substituted off) 43' |
| LP | 1 | Gordon Reid | | (substituted off) 43' |
Replacements:
| HK | 16 | Ross Ford | | (substituted on) 43' |
| PR | 17 | Allan Dell | | (substituted on) 43' |
| PR | 18 | Simon Berghan | | (substituted on) 60' |
| LK | 19 | Tim Swinson | | (substituted on) 74' |
| FL | 20 | Cornell du Preez | | (substituted on) 61' |
| SH | 21 | Henry Pyrgos | | | (substituted on) 21' |
| FH | 22 | Duncan Weir | | (substituted on) 44' |
| CE | 23 | Mark Bennett | | (substituted on) 17' | (substituted off) 21' |
Coach:
(New Zealand) Vern Cotter

Man of the Match:
Jonathan Joseph (England)

Touch judges:
Romain Poite (France)
Marius Mitrea (Italy)
Television match official:
Ben Skeen (New Zealand)

Notes:

- Joe Marler (England) earned his 50th test cap.
- Cornell du Preez (Scotland) made his international debut.
- For a second consecutive season, England claimed the Six Nations title prior to the final round.
- The 61 points scored by England is the most scored against Scotland, and the 40-point margin equalled their previous largest winning margin set in 2001 (43–3).
- This was also the most points Scotland had scored against England at Twickenham since 2005, when they scored 22 points, and the second largest number of points they had ever scored in a game away to England overall.
- England matched New Zealand's International record of 18 consecutive wins set between August 2015 and October 2016.
- England won their 11th consecutive Six Nations match, a championship record.
- England retained the Calcutta Cup.

=== Round 5 ===
18 March 2017
12:30 GMT (UTC+0)

| (1 BP) Scotland | 29–0 | Italy |
| Try: Russell 27' c Scott 37' m Visser 61' c Seymour 72' c Con: Russell (3/4) 28', 62', 73'; Pen: Hogg (1/1) 5' | Report |

Murrayfield Stadium, Edinburgh
Attendance: 67,144
Referee: Pascal Gaüzère (France)

| FB | 15 | Stuart Hogg |
| RW | 14 | Tommy Seymour |
| OC | 13 | Huw Jones | | (substituted off) 26' |
| IC | 12 | Alex Dunbar |
| LW | 11 | Tim Visser |
| FH | 10 | Finn Russell |
| SH | 9 | Ali Price | | (substituted off) 53' |
| N8 | 8 | Ryan Wilson | | (substituted off) 48' |
| OF | 7 | Hamish Watson |
| BF | 6 | John Barclay (c) | (yellow card) 48' |
| RL | 5 | Jonny Gray |
| LL | 4 | Grant Gilchrist | | (substituted off) 56' |
| TP | 3 | Zander Fagerson | | (substituted off) 65' |
| HK | 2 | Ross Ford | | (substituted off) 65' |
| LP | 1 | Gordon Reid | | (substituted off) 55' |
Replacements:
| HK | 16 | Fraser Brown | | (substituted on) 65' |
| PR | 17 | Allan Dell | | (substituted on) 55' |
| PR | 18 | Simon Berghan | | (substituted on) 65' |
| LK | 19 | Tim Swinson | | (substituted on) 56' |
| FL | 20 | Cornell du Preez | | (substituted on) 48' |
| SH | 21 | Henry Pyrgos | | (substituted on) 53' |
| FH | 22 | Duncan Weir | | | (substituted on) 74' |
| CE | 23 | Matt Scott | | (substituted on) 26' | (substituted off) 74' |
Coach:
(New Zealand) Vern Cotter

| FB | 15 | Edoardo Padovani |
| RW | 14 | Angelo Esposito |
| OC | 13 | Tommaso Benvenuti |
| IC | 12 | Luke McLean |
| LW | 11 | Giovanbattista Venditti |
| FH | 10 | Carlo Canna | (substituted off) 62' |
| SH | 9 | Edoardo Gori | (substituted off) 52' |
| N8 | 8 | Sergio Parisse (c) |
| OF | 7 | Maxime Mbanda | (substituted off) 52' |
| BF | 6 | Braam Steyn |
| RL | 5 | George Biagi | (substituted off) 74' |
| LL | 4 | Marco Fuser | (substituted off) 52' |
| TP | 3 | Lorenzo Cittadini | (substituted off) 40' |
| HK | 2 | Ornel Gega | (substituted off) 40' |
| LP | 1 | Andrea Lovotti | (substituted off) 52' |
Replacements:
| HK | 16 | Leonardo Ghiraldini | (substituted on) 40' |
| PR | 17 | Sami Panico | (substituted on) 52' |
| PR | 18 | Dario Chistolini | (substituted on) 40' |
| LK | 19 | Dries van Schalkwyk | (substituted on) 52' |
| LK | 20 | Federico Ruzza | (substituted on) 74' |
| FL | 21 | Francesco Minto | (substituted on) 52' |
| SH | 22 | Marcello Violi | (substituted on) 52' |
| FB | 23 | Luca Sperandio | (substituted on) 62' |
Coach:
(Ireland) Conor O'Shea

Man of the Match:
Finn Russell (Scotland)

Touch judges:
Nigel Owens (Wales)
Luke Pearce (England)
Television match official:
Marius Jonker (South Africa)

Notes:

- Federico Ruzza (Italy) made his international debut.
- This was Vern Cotter's last game as head coach.
- This was the first time Scotland has kept Italy scoreless.
- This was the first time, since beating Canada 41–0 in 2008, that Scotland kept their opponent scoreless.
- This was Scotland's first match in the Six Nations where they kept their opponent scoreless.
- The match concluded Scotland's most successful Six Nations tournament since they won 3 games in 2006.

18 March 2017
15:45 CET (UTC+1)

| France | 20–18 | Wales (1 BP) |
| Try: Lamerat 6' c Chouly 80+19' c Con: Lopez (2/2) 7', 80+20'; Pen: Lopez (2/3) 15', 66' | Report | Pen: Halfpenny (6/6) 19', 27', 39', 53', 64', 71' |

Stade de France, Paris
Attendance: 78,688
Referee: Wayne Barnes (England)

| FB | 15 | Brice Dulin |
| RW | 14 | Noa Nakaitaci |
| OC | 13 | Rémi Lamerat | | | | (substituted off) 65' |
| IC | 12 | Gaël Fickou |
| LW | 11 | Virimi Vakatawa | (yellow card) 18' | (substituted off) 53' |
| FH | 10 | Camille Lopez | | (substituted off) 32' | (substituted on) 39' |
| SH | 9 | Baptiste Serin | | (substituted off) 18' | (substituted on) 24' | (substituted off) 71' |
| N8 | 8 | Louis Picamoles |
| OF | 7 | Kevin Gourdon |
| BF | 6 | Fabien Sanconnie | | (substituted off) 54' |
| RL | 5 | Yoann Maestri |
| LL | 4 | Sébastien Vahaamahina | | (substituted off) 77' |
| TP | 3 | Rabah Slimani | | (substituted off) 54' | (substituted on) 80' |
| HK | 2 | Guilhem Guirado (c) | | (substituted off) 71' |
| LP | 1 | Cyril Baille | | (substituted off) 54' |
Replacements:
| HK | 16 | Camille Chat | | (substituted on) 71' |
| PR | 17 | Uini Atonio | | (substituted on) 54' | (substituted off) 80' |
| PR | 18 | Eddy Ben Arous | | (substituted on) 54' |
| LK | 19 | Julien Le Devedec | | (substituted on) 77' |
| N8 | 20 | Damien Chouly | | (substituted on) 54' |
| SH | 21 | Antoine Dupont | | (substituted on) 18' | (substituted off) 24' | (substituted on) 71' |
| FH | 22 | François Trinh-Duc | | (substituted on) 32' | (substituted off) 39' | (substituted on) 65' |
| WG | 23 | Yoann Huget | | (substituted on) 53' |
Coach:
(France) Guy Novès

| FB | 15 | Leigh Halfpenny | | | (substituted off) 80+5' | (substituted on) 80+12' |
| RW | 14 | George North |
| OC | 13 | Jonathan Davies |
| IC | 12 | Scott Williams | | (substituted off) 53' |
| LW | 11 | Liam Williams |
| FH | 10 | Dan Biggar |
| SH | 9 | Rhys Webb |
| N8 | 8 | Ross Moriarty | | (substituted off) 53' | (substituted on) 71' |
| OF | 7 | Justin Tipuric |
| BF | 6 | Sam Warburton |
| RL | 5 | Alun Wyn Jones (c) | | (substituted off) 51' |
| LL | 4 | Jake Ball | | (substituted off) 59' |
| TP | 3 | Tomas Francis | | (substituted off) 59' | (substituted on) 80+5' | (substituted off) 80+12' |
| HK | 2 | Ken Owens |
| LP | 1 | Rob Evans | | (substituted off) 80+16' |
Replacements:
| HK | 16 | Scott Baldwin | | (substituted on) 59' | (substituted off) 71' |
| PR | 17 | Nicky Smith | | (substituted on) 80+16' |
| PR | 18 | Samson Lee | (yellow card) 80+1' | (substituted on) 59' |
| LK | 19 | Luke Charteris | | (substituted on) 51' |
| N8 | 20 | Taulupe Faletau | | (substituted on) 53' |
| SH | 21 | Gareth Davies |
| FH | 22 | Sam Davies |
| CE | 23 | Jamie Roberts | | (substituted on) 53' |
Coach:
(Wales) Rob Howley

Man of the Match:
Brice Dulin (France)

Touch judges:
Ben O’Keeffe (New Zealand)
Matthew Carley (England)
Television match official:
Peter Fitzgibbon (Ireland)

Notes:

- Ken Owens (Wales) earned his 50th test cap.
- This was France's first win over Wales since their 9–8 victory during the 2011 Rugby World Cup.
- France finished in the top half of the table for the first time since 2011 and Wales finished in the bottom half for the first time since that same year, with fifth their lowest position since 2007.
- The winning points were scored in the 100th minute of the match in one of the longest games on record.

18 March 2017
17:00 GMT (UTC+0)

| Ireland | 13–9 | England (1 BP) |
| Try: Henderson 23' c Con: Sexton (1/1) 23'; Pen: Sexton (2/2) 10', 62' | Report | Pen: Farrell (3/3) 17', 50', 66' |

Aviva Stadium, Dublin
Attendance: 51,700
Referee: Jérôme Garcès (France)

| FB | 15 | Jared Payne |
| RW | 14 | Keith Earls | (substituted off) 40' |
| OC | 13 | Garry Ringrose |
| IC | 12 | Robbie Henshaw |
| LW | 11 | Simon Zebo |
| FH | 10 | Johnny Sexton |
| SH | 9 | Kieran Marmion | (substituted off) 68' |
| N8 | 8 | CJ Stander |
| OF | 7 | Seán O'Brien | (substituted off) 65' |
| BF | 6 | Peter O'Mahony |
| RL | 5 | Iain Henderson |
| LL | 4 | Donnacha Ryan | (substituted off) 64' |
| TP | 3 | Tadhg Furlong | (substituted off) 75' |
| HK | 2 | Rory Best (c) | 9' to 17' | | (substituted off) 72' |
| LP | 1 | Jack McGrath | (substituted on) 59' |
Replacements:
| HK | 16 | Niall Scannell | (substituted on) 9' | (substituted off) 17' | (substituted on) 72' |
| PR | 17 | Cian Healy | (substituted on) 59' |
| PR | 18 | John Ryan | (substituted on) 75' |
| LK | 19 | Devin Toner | (substituted on) 64' |
| FL | 20 | Dan Leavy | (substituted on) 65' |
| SH | 21 | Luke McGrath | (substituted on) 68' |
| FH | 22 | Paddy Jackson |
| WG | 23 | Andrew Conway | (substituted on) 40' |
Coach:
(New Zealand) Joe Schmidt

| FB | 15 | Mike Brown |
| RW | 14 | Anthony Watson |
| OC | 13 | Jonathan Joseph | (substituted off) 67' |
| IC | 12 | Owen Farrell |
| LW | 11 | Elliot Daly |
| FH | 10 | George Ford | (substituted off) 62' | (substituted on) 69' |
| SH | 9 | Ben Youngs | (substituted off) 62' |
| N8 | 8 | Billy Vunipola | (substituted off) 62' |
| OF | 7 | James Haskell | (substituted off) 59' |
| BF | 6 | Maro Itoje |
| RL | 5 | Courtney Lawes |
| LL | 4 | Joe Launchbury |
| TP | 3 | Dan Cole | (substituted off) 77' |
| HK | 2 | Dylan Hartley (c) | (substituted off) 54' |
| LP | 1 | Joe Marler | (substituted off) 40' |
Replacements:
| HK | 16 | Jamie George | (substituted on) 54' |
| PR | 17 | Mako Vunipola | (substituted on) 40' |
| PR | 18 | Kyle Sinckler | (substituted on) 77' |
| FL | 19 | Tom Wood | (substituted on) 59' |
| N8 | 20 | Nathan Hughes | (substituted on) 62' |
| SH | 21 | Danny Care | (substituted on) 62' |
| CE | 22 | Ben Te'o | (substituted on) 62' | (substituted off) 69' |
| WG | 23 | Jack Nowell | (substituted on) 67' |
Coach:
(Australia) Eddie Jones

Man of the Match:
Peter O'Mahony (Ireland)

Touch judges:
Mathieu Raynal (France)
Marius Mitrea (Italy)
Television match official:
Ben Skeen (New Zealand)

Notes:

- Jamie Heaslip withdrew from the team after suffering an injury during the pre-match warm-up. He never recovered from the injury or played again and retired in February 2018.
- Andrew Conway (Ireland) made his international debut.
- Tom Wood (England) earned his 50th test cap.
- This was Eddie Jones's first loss as England coach, and England's first since losing 33–13 to Australia in the 2015 Rugby World Cup.
- Ireland reclaimed the Millennium Trophy.
- This was the second time in six months that Ireland had beaten a team with 18 straight wins, having also ended New Zealand's winning streak in November 2016.

== Statistics ==
A record eight players were joint top try scorers, with Ireland flanker CJ Stander the first forward in the Six Nations era to score a hat-trick in a single match, against Italy. Stander's compatriot Craig Gilroy's own hat-trick in the same game set a new record – a replacement scoring three tries despite playing only 33 minutes in the entire tournament.

=== Top points scorers ===
| Pos | Name | Team | Pts |
|---|---|---|---|
| 1 | Camille Lopez | France | 67 |
| 2 | Owen Farrell | England | 63 |
| 3 | Leigh Halfpenny | Wales | 62 |
| 4 | Finn Russell | Scotland | 45 |
| 5 | Paddy Jackson | Ireland | 36 |
| 6 | Johnny Sexton | Ireland | 25 |
| 7 | Stuart Hogg | Scotland | 18 |
| 8 | Carlo Canna | Italy | 15 |
| 8 | Danny Care | England | 15 |
| 8 | Keith Earls | Ireland | 15 |
| 8 | Craig Gilroy | Ireland | 15 |
| 8 | Jonathan Joseph | England | 15 |
| 8 | George North | Wales | 15 |
| 8 | CJ Stander | Ireland | 15 |
| 8 | Liam Williams | Wales | 15 |

=== Top try scorers ===
| Pos | Name | Team | Tries |
|---|---|---|---|
| 1 | Danny Care | England | 3 |
| 1 | Keith Earls | Ireland | 3 |
| 1 | Craig Gilroy | Ireland | 3 |
| 1 | Stuart Hogg | Scotland | 3 |
| 1 | Jonathan Joseph | England | 3 |
| 1 | George North | Wales | 3 |
| 1 | CJ Stander | Ireland | 3 |
| 1 | Liam Williams | Wales | 3 |
| 9 | Elliot Daly | England | 2 |
| 9 | Gaël Fickou | France | 2 |
| 9 | Iain Henderson | Ireland | 2 |
| 9 | Huw Jones | Scotland | 2 |
| 9 | Jack Nowell | England | 2 |
| 9 | Tommy Seymour | Scotland | 2 |
| 9 | Ben Te'o | England | 2 |
| 9 | Tim Visser | Scotland | 2 |

== See also ==
- 2017 Women's Six Nations Championship
