= Gabriel Lacroix =

French rugby union player (born 1993)

- Born: 19 October 1993 (age 33) Toulouse, France
- Height: 1.71 m (5 ft 7 1/2 in)
- Weight: 80 kg (12 st 8 lb; 180 lb)

Rugby union career
- Position: Winger
Amateur team(s)
Years	Team	Apps	(Points)
- Toulouse
2010–2011	Auch		
Senior career
Years	Team	Apps	(Points)
2011–2015	Albi	57	(80)
2015–2021	La Rochelle	60	(100)
- Correct as of 13 January 2018
International career
Years	Team	Apps	(Points)
2013	France U20	8	(10)
2017	France	1	(5)
- Correct as of 25 November 2017

Gabriel Lacroix (born 19 October 1993) is a former French rugby union player. His position was a winger and he used to play for Stade Rochelais.

== Club career ==
Born in Toulouse, he began his career with nearby club Toulouse in the Top 14 before moving to SC Albi and then Stade Rochelais. In December 2016, he scored four tries in twelve minutes against Bayonne. In 2021, after years of struggling with injuries, he announced his retirement from the sport.

== International career ==
On 5 February 2017, Lacroix was called up to the France senior squad for the first time to replace the injured Yann David in the 2017 Six Nations.
