= Henry Chavancy =

French rugby union player

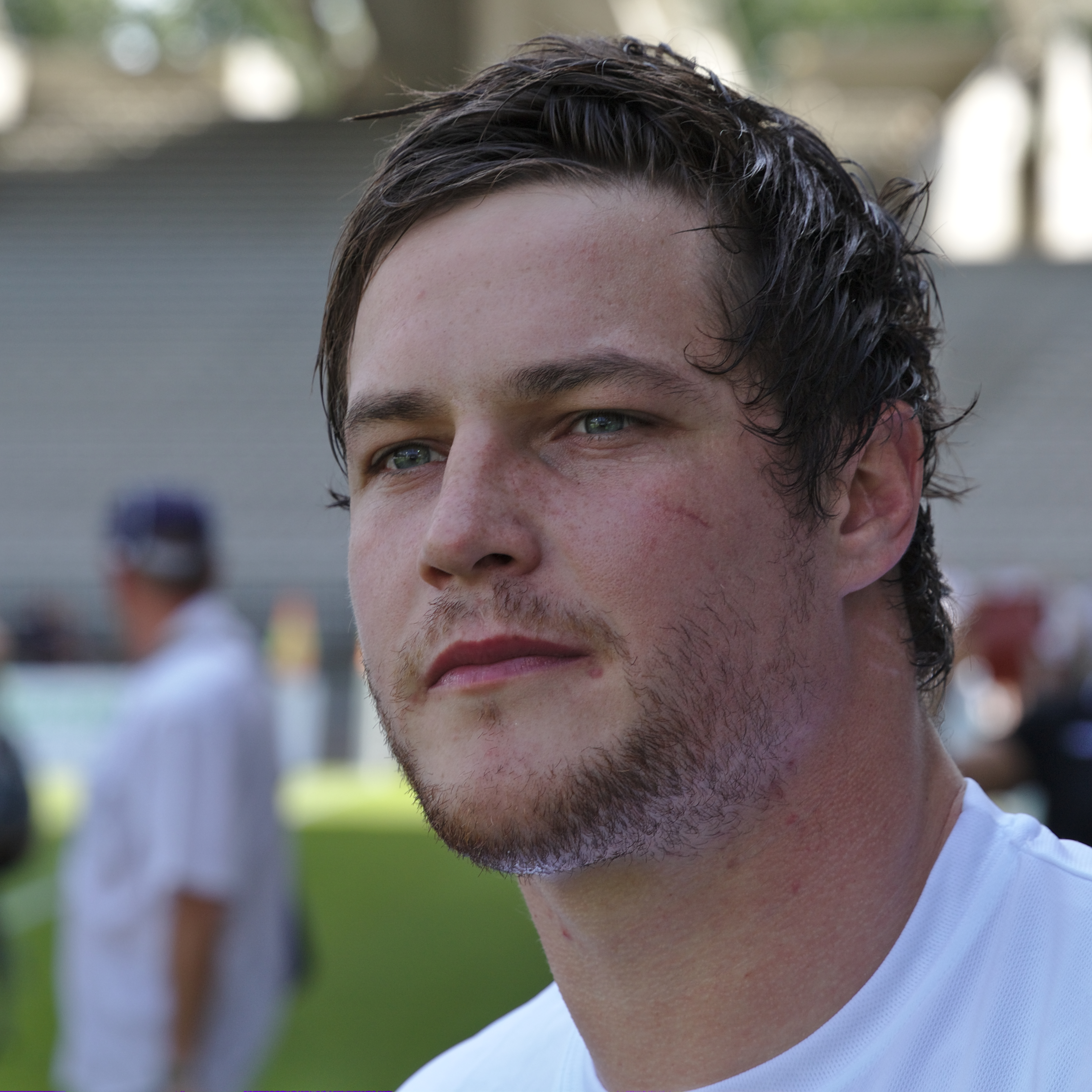
- Born: 22 May 1988 (age 38) Strasbourg, France
- Height: 1.80 m (5 ft 11 in)
- Weight: 97 kg (15 st 4 lb)

Rugby union career
- Position: Centre
- Current team: Racing 92
Senior career
| Years | Team | Apps | (Points) |
| 2007– | Racing 92 | 415 | (285) |
- Correct as of 13 May 2025
International career
| Years | Team | Apps | (Points) |
| 2008 | France U20 | 6 | (10) |
| 2017–2018 | France | 5 | (10) |

Henry Chavancy (born 22 May 1988) is a French rugby union player. He plays as a centre for Racing 92 in the Top 14.

== Early life ==
He studied at lycée Saint-Louis-de-Gonzague and lycée militaire de Saint-Cyr after 2 years at the secondary school Joseph Kessel in Djibouti. He also studied 4 years at the Léonard de Vinci Business School.

== Career ==
=== Club ===
Henry Chavancy has been playing for the Racing Métro 92 since 1999. He is 2005 French Taddei Champion, 2009 French Pro D2 Champion and 2011 Top 14 semi-finalist. He played his first game of Pro D2 during the 2007/2008 season. During the 2008/2009 season he played 20 games and become French Champion of Pro D2 with his team. Since 2009 he has been playing 54 Top 14 games and 8 games during the European Cup.

In 2016, he won Top 14 by defeating Toulon in the final at Camp Nou in Barcelona, before an attendance exceeding 99,000 people.

=== International ===
Under-20 French International player, he played the worldchampionship in June 2008 and then the college worldchampionship if rugby 7 the same year. In 2009 he played during six nations championship with the university French team. In June 2010 he was selected in the French team A for the Churchill Cup in the United-States.

Chavancy made his debut against Ireland in the 2017 Six Nations replacing Rémi Lamerat in the 59th minute of a 19–9 away loss.

== Honours ==
=== Racing 92 ===
- Top 14: 2015–16
- Pro D2: 2008–09
- European Rugby Champions Cup runner-up: 2015–16, 2017–18, 2019–20
