= Michele Campagnaro =

Italian rugby union player

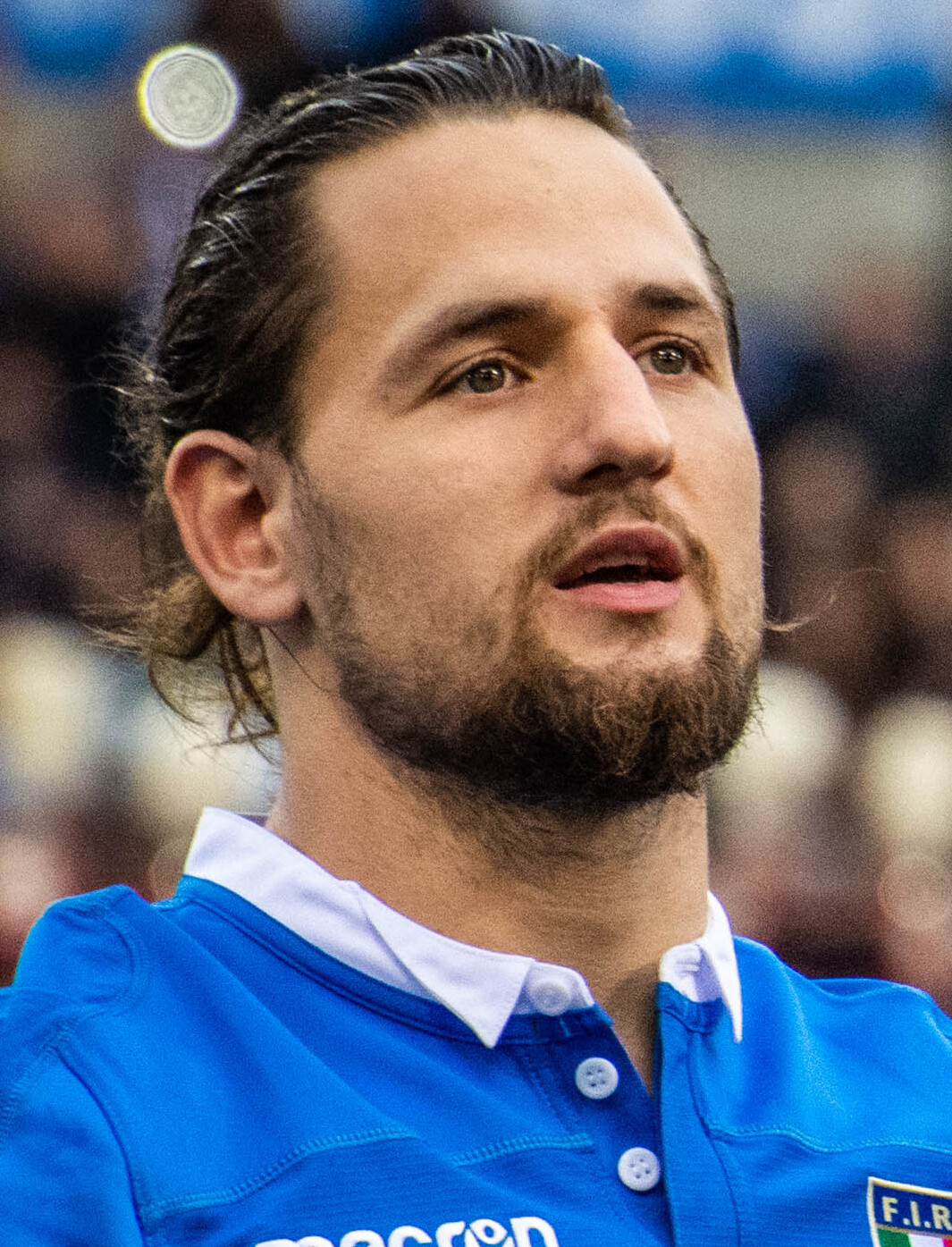
- Born: 13 March 1993 (age 33) Mirano, Italy
- Height: 182 cm (6 ft 0 in)
- Weight: 99 kg (218 lb; 15 st 8 lb)

Rugby union career
- Position(s): Centre, Wing
Senior career
Years	Team	Apps	(Points)
2013–2015	Benetton	34	(30)
2015–2017	Exeter Chiefs	25	(40)
2018–2019	Wasps	7	(0)
2019-2021	Harlequins	7	(0)
2021–2023	Colomiers	36	(15)
- Correct as of 23 January 2024
International career
Years	Team	Apps	(Points)
2011–2013	Italy U20	20	(29)
2013–	Italy	46	(45)
- Correct as of 6 November 2022

Michele Campagnaro (Italian pronunciation: [miˈkɛːle kampaɲˈɲaːro]; born 13 March 1993) is a former Italian rugby union player. He represented Italy at international level, having made his test debut against Fiji during the 2013 Autumn Internationals.

== Club career ==
On his debut for Benetton against Connacht in May 2013, Campagnaro was awarded man of the match.

On 19 February 2015, Campagnaro signed for English club Exeter Chiefs in the Aviva Premiership on a two-year contract from the 2015–16 season.

Campagnaro took a while to find his feet in the Chiefs' first team, scoring his first try for the club against the Cardiff Blues in the Anglo-Welsh Cup. He had a run of games in the number 13 jersey during January 2017 that saw him score six tries in four matches, including a hat-trick against Wasps. He was a replacement as Exeter Chiefs defeated Wasps to be crowned champions of the 2016-17 English Premiership.

Following his departure from Exeter, he signed for Wasps on a deal until the end of the 2018–19 season. On 19 March 2019, Campagnaro has signed for Harlequins from the 2019–20 season, after the 2019 Rugby World Cup.

On 6 April 2021, Campagnaro would leave Harlequins as signed a two-year deal with Pro D2 side Colomiers in France from the 2021-22 season.

== International career ==
Campagnaro has caps for Italy including four appearances in the 2015 Rugby World Cup and two in the 2019 Rugby World Cup. He made his international debut vs Fiji on 23 November 2013. He has captained Italy on one occasion, in a test match played in Chicago against Ireland during the 2018 Autumn test series; on the occasion, Campagnaro also scored the lone try of Italy, in a 54-7 defeat. He has scored nine tries for Italy including two in the Six Nations match between Wales and Italy in 2014 which Wales won 23-15 despite Campagnaro scoring twice. Campagnaro won many plaudits for his Man of the match performance.

He was injured for much of the 2015 Six Nations campaign.

Campagnaro returned to the Italy team during the 2016 tournament and was one of the team's standout performers, in an otherwise disappointing campaign.

In the 2017 Six Nations, Campagnaro came off the bench in the first two games against Wales and Ireland. He started Italy's third test of the championship against England at Twickenham. In the 59th minute of this game, Campagnaro scored a magnificent solo try which saw him evade challenges from both George Ford and Mike Brown.
