= Arthur Iturria =

French rugby union player (born 1994)

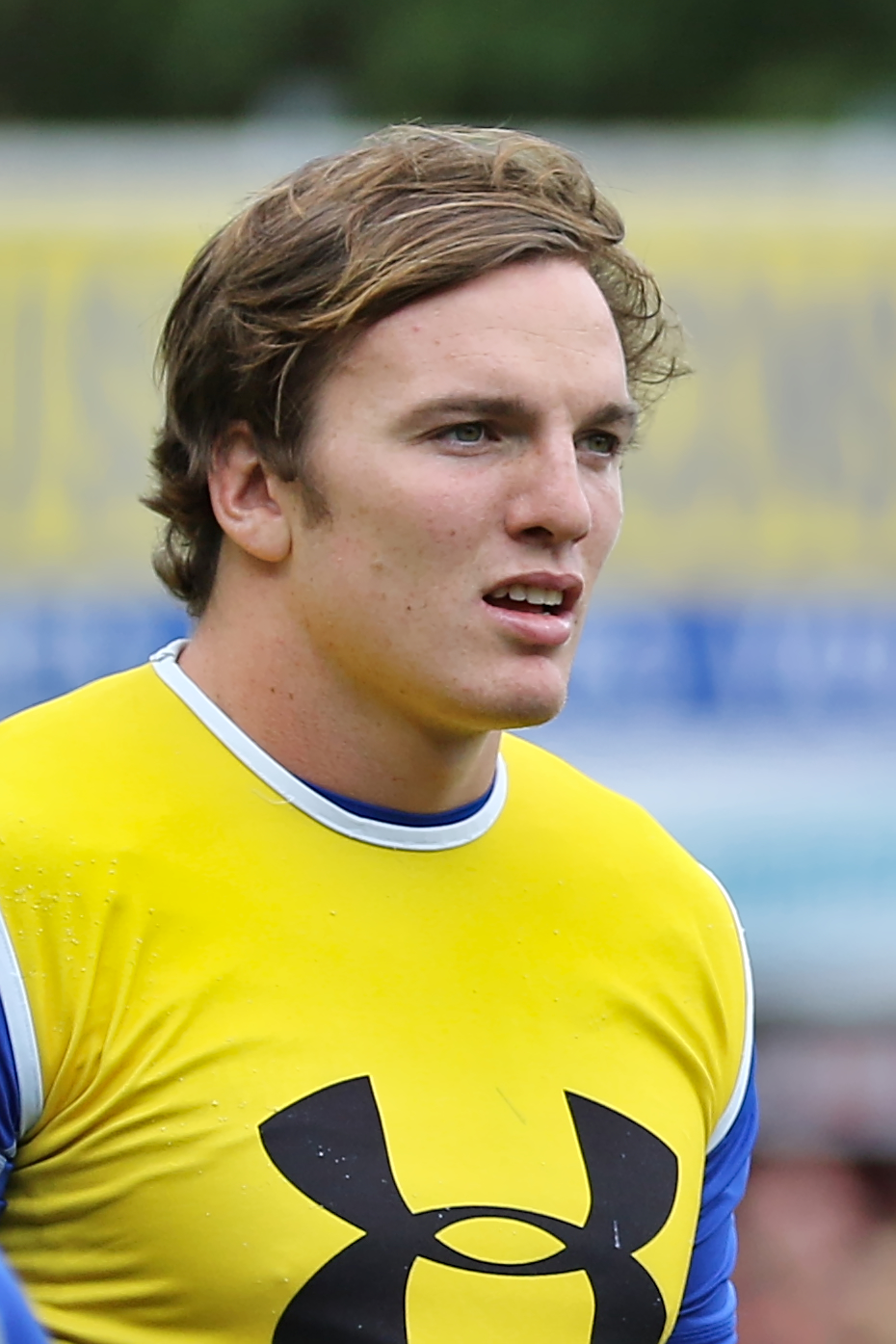
- Iturria in 2015
- Born: 13 May 1994 (age 32) Bayonne, France
- Height: 1.98 m (6 ft 6 in)
- Weight: 107 kg (16 st 12 lb; 236 lb)

Rugby union career
- Position(s): Lock, Flanker
Amateur team(s)
Years	Team	Apps	(Points)
- US Morlaas
Senior career
Years	Team	Apps	(Points)
2015–2023	Clermont	124	(65)
2023–	Bayonne	16	(0)
- Correct as of 18 March 2024
International career
Years	Team	Apps	(Points)
2017–	France	15	(5)
- Correct as of 2 October 2019

Arthur Iturria (born 13 May 1994) is a French rugby union player who plays for French Top 14 side Bayonne. Iturria was part of the French squad for the 2017 Six Nations Championship.
