= Kevin Gourdon =

French rugby union player (born 1990)

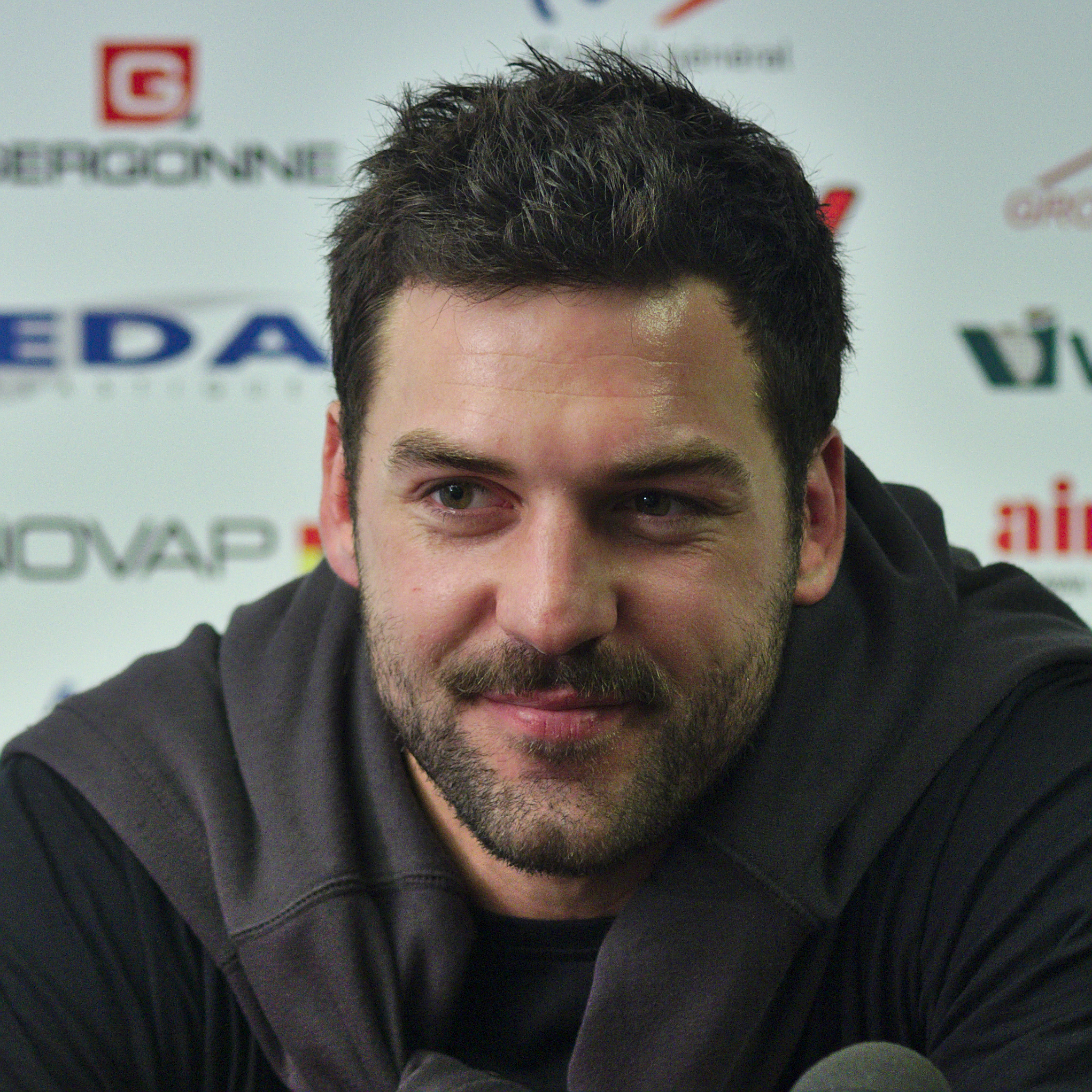
- Born: Kevin Gourdon; 23 January 1990 (age 36) Valence, France
- Height: 1.90 m (6 ft 3 in)
- Weight: 103 kg (16 st 3 lb; 227 lb)

Rugby union career
- Position: Flanker
- Current team: La Rochelle
Amateur team(s)
Years	Team	Apps	(Points)
–2007	La Voulte Rugby		
2007–2008	Toulon		
2008–2011	Clermont		
Senior career
Years	Team	Apps	(Points)
2011–2021	La Rochelle	222	(125)
International career
Years	Team	Apps	(Points)
2016–2018	France	19	(0)

Kevin Gourdon (born 23 January 1990) is a former French rugby union player. He played as a flanker for French Top 14 side La Rochelle and the France national team.

== International career ==
Gourdon made his debut for France in June 2016 and was part of the squad for the 2017 Six Nations Championship.
