= Sami Panico =

- Born: 4 June 1993 (age 33) Albano Laziale
- Height: 1.85 m (6 ft 1 in)
- Weight: 107 kg (16 st 12 lb; 236 lb)

Rugby union career
- Position: Prop/Hooker
- Current team: Zebre
Youth career
- Capitolina
Senior career
Years	Team	Apps	(Points)
2011-2012	F.I.R. Academy		
2012-2013	Lazio	12	(5)
2013-2017	Calvisano	64	(30)
2017-2018	Zebre	6	(0)
- Correct as of 3 July 2016
International career
Years	Team	Apps	(Points)
2011−2013	Italy Under 20	11	(0)
2016-2017	Italy	10	(0)
- Correct as of 18 March 2017

Sami Panico (born 4 June 1993) is an Italian rugby union player of Ethiopian descent who plays as a Prop, he currently plays for Calvisano. Panico made his debut for the Italian national team in June 2016 and was part of the squad for the 2017 Six Nations Championship.

In 2014 and 2016, Panico was a permit player for Zebre, but he didn't play in official matches.

On 1 October 2018, it was announced that Panico had been arrested after 1.5 kilos of marijuana, 330 grammes of hashish and €10,000 in cash were discovered in the garden of his home in Rome, Italy. His rugby club, Zebre, suspended him on 8 September 2018 while the investigation was taking place. On 5 October 2018, Zebre announced that they had cancelled Panico's contract with the club.
