= Fabien Sanconnie =

French rugby union player (born 1995)

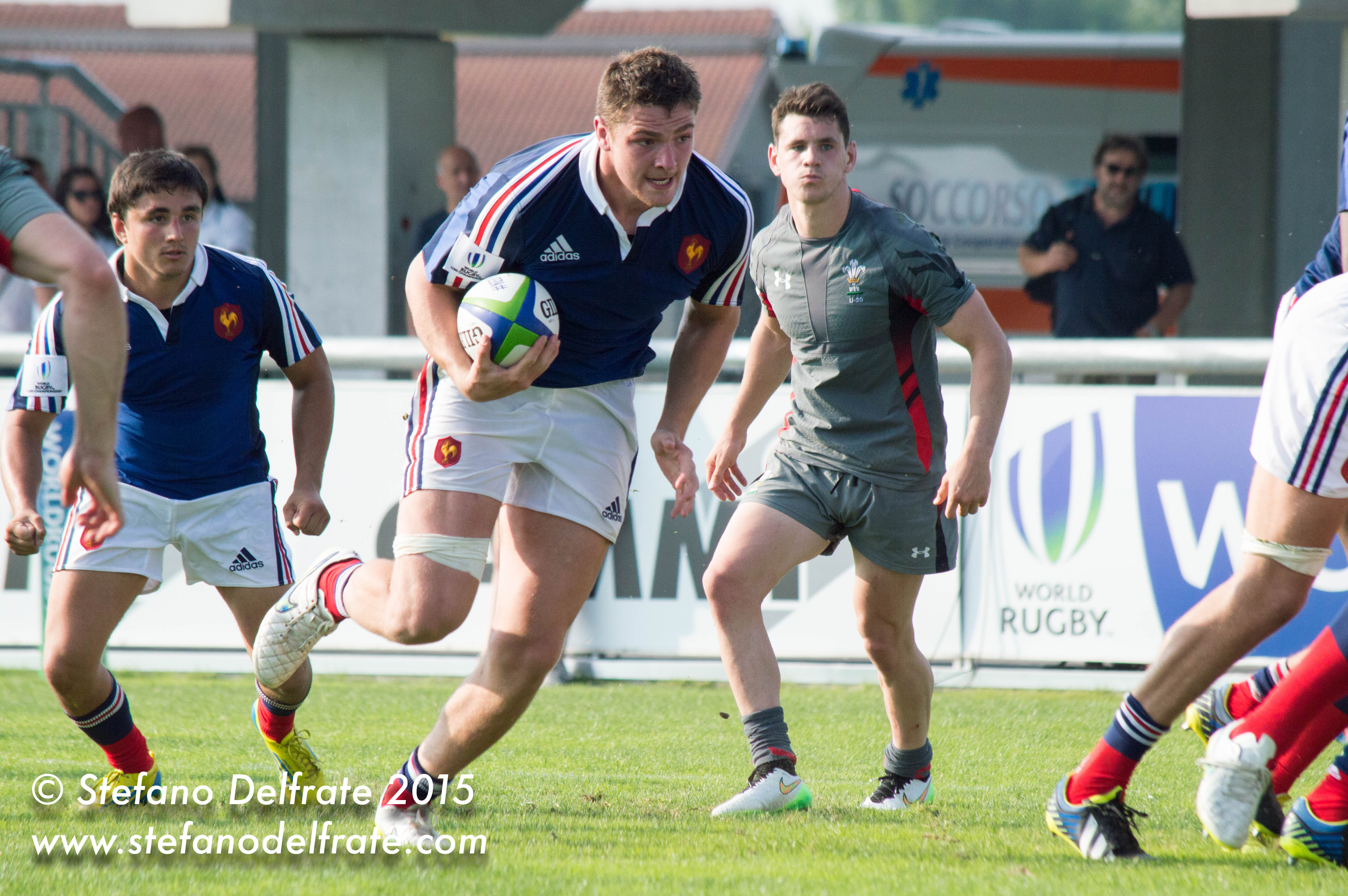
- Sanconnie with ball-in-hand at the 2015 World Rugby Under 20 Championship
- Born: Fabien Sanconnie; 21 February 1995 (age 31) France
- Height: 1.95 m (6 ft 5 in)
- Weight: 114 kg (17 st 13 lb; 251 lb)

Rugby union career
- Position: Flanker
- Current team: Racing 92
Amateur team(s)
| Years | Team | Apps | (Points) |
- Larche
Senior career
| Years | Team | Apps | (Points) |
| 2014–2018 | Brive | 65 | (20) |
| 2018– | Racing 92 | 0 | (0) |
- Correct as of 5 May 2018
International career
| Years | Team | Apps | (Points) |
| 2015 | France U20 | 10 | (10) |
| 2017– | France | 5 | (0) |
- Correct as of 9 June 2018

Fabien Sanconnie (born 21 February 1995) is a French rugby union player, who plays for French Top 14 side Racing 92.

== International career ==
Sanconnie was part of the French squad for the 2017 Six Nations Championship.
