= Elliot Daly =

British Lions & England international rugby union player

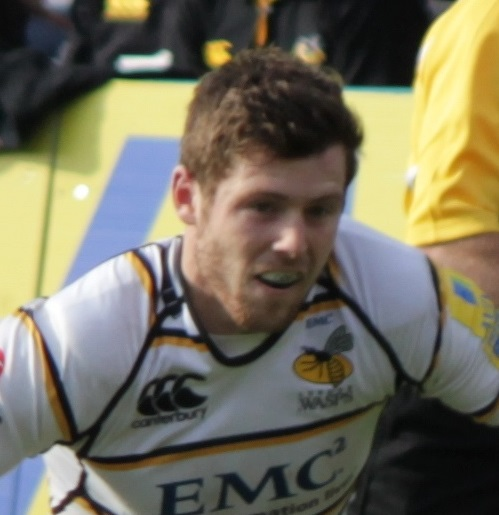
- Daly representing Wasps during the Aviva Premiership
- Full name: Elliot Fitzgerald Daly
- Born: 8 October 1992 (age 34) Croydon, England
- Height: 1.84 m (6 ft 0 in)
- Weight: 94 kg (207 lb; 14 st 11 lb)
- School: Whitgift School

Rugby union career
- Position(s): Centre, Wing, Full-back, Fly-half
- Current team: Saracens
Senior career
Years	Team	Apps	(Points)
2010–2019	Wasps	193	(404)
2019–	Saracens	103	(177)
- Correct as of 19 January 2025
International career
Years	Team	Apps	(Points)
2009–2010	England U18	9	(20)
2011–2012	England U20	8	(48)
2013	England Saxons	4	(3)
2016–	England	79	(128)
2017–	British & Irish Lions	5	(3)
- Correct as of 24th March 2026
Medal record
Men's Rugby union
Representing England
Rugby World Cup
Silver medal – second place	2019 Japan	Squad
Bronze medal – third place	2023 France	Squad

Elliot Fitzgerald Daly (born 8 October 1992) is an English professional rugby union player who plays as a utility back for Premiership Rugby club Saracens and the England national team.

== Early life ==
Daly was a talented cricketer as a teenager, representing England Under-15s and Surrey at various age-group levels. He was an all-rounder, with fast bowling his forte, and appeared good enough to possibly make the first-class county grade before he chose rugby union. Daly played his early rugby at Beckenham from age five before moving to Dorking in 2006, where he spent three years. He was educated at Whitgift School. It was at Whitgift that he developed his long range kicking game where he was known to take the car keys of his teacher, Bobby Walsh, to get balls for practice.

== Club career ==
Daly joined Wasps' Elite Player Development Squad before progressing to the academy. He debuted at centre against Exeter Chiefs in the Anglo-Welsh Cup in November 2010 whilst still a pupil at Whitgift and in the process became the second-youngest player to represent the club. His first Premiership game followed later that month against Bath and he finished the 2010–11 season with six appearances which came at centre, full-back and on the wing.

Daly was an established member of Wasps having featured in over 150 Premiership matches for the side. His speed and long-range kicking abilities alongside his ability to see space is among what made him such a stand-out player, and he played a vital role for Wasps whether he was at 13, 11, or 15.

On 4 February 2019, Daly agreed to leave Wasps to join Premiership rivals Saracens prior to the 2019–20 season.

Daly helped Saracens win the Premiership title in 2023. He began the game on the bench, but came on as a first half replacement for Sean Maitland and then scored a crucial try, as Saracens defeated Sale Sharks by 35–25.

== International career ==
=== England ===
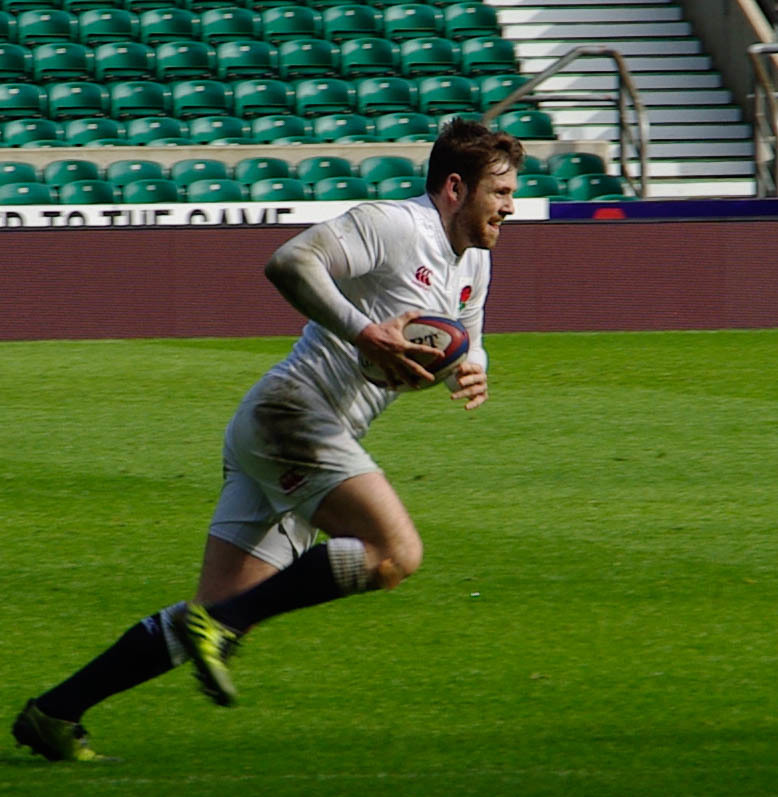
Daly training during the 2017 Six Nations

Daly has represented England at U16, U18, U20 and senior level, including winning an U20 Grand Slam in 2011, and reaching the Junior World Cup final in the same year. Since making his senior debut for England in 2016, Daly has gone on to win back-to-back Six Nations Championships in 2016 and 2017. In the years following his debut, he has made over 70 appearances for the senior team.

Daly was selected for England's 2015 Rugby World Cup training squad. Daly received his first call up to the senior England squad by new coach Eddie Jones on 13 January 2016 for the 2016 Six Nations Championship.

Daly made his international debut against Ireland on 27 February 2016, replacing Owen Farrell at inside centre in a 21–10 victory.

Daly made his first international start against South Africa on 12 November 2016 in the Old Mutual Wealth series. He started at outside centre starring alongside Owen Farrell who played inside centre. He also scored his first international points kicking a long-range penalty in the 39th minute of the first half.

Daly scored his first international try for England when he started on the wing in England's 58–15 victory over Fiji at Twickenham on 19 November 2016.

On 26 November 2016, he became the first England back, and only the second England player, to be sent off at Twickenham. Daly went for a tackle in the air against Argentina's number 8 Leonardo Senatore who landed on his head and shoulders in the fifth minute of the first half, and was subsequently given a red card and 3 week ban. Despite Daly's dismissal and playing 75 minutes a man short, England won the match 27–14.

Daly was named in the England team to face France at Twickenham in the first game of the 2017 Six Nations on 4 February. He scored a long-range penalty and was denied a try by a last-gasp tackle from the French. Daly started on the wing again against Wales in Cardiff on 11 February. With England losing 16-14 and five minutes left on the clock, Daly took a pass from Owen Farrell, escaped the clutches of Alex Cuthbert and sprinted 20 metres to dive over in the corner, winning the match for England. Daly scored his second try of the tournament during England's 36–15 win over Italy. In the 2019 Six Nations, Daly played at fullback and scored the second try in England's opening 32–20 away win over Ireland, grounding his own grubber kick following Jacob Stockdale's handling error under pressure.

On 12 August 2019, Daly was announced as part of the England squad for the 2019 Rugby World Cup in Japan, having impressed with his pace and his ability to kick long-range penalties.

In January 2025, Daly was recalled to the senior squad for the 2025 Six Nations Championship. He was named on the bench for the second round fixture against France, his first involvement with the national side since featuring in the 2024 tournament. Having entered the match with his team behind on the scoreboard, Daly scored the decisive try in the 79th minute, which led to a 26–25 victory for England.

=== British & Irish Lions ===
Daly made history on the 2017 British & Irish Lions tour to New Zealand, both individually and as part of a test side that claimed a dramatic drawn series with the All Blacks. On a personal level, he joined an elite club of people to have played for and against the Lions, and an even smaller club to have scored both for and against the British and Irish Lions. In 2013, he was part of the Barbarians side that took on the tourists in Hong Kong on the first leg of their tour to Australia – he even kicked a penalty in the defeat.

Daly did not feature in the match against the Blues, he played in the following fixtures against the Highlanders and Māori All Blacks before going on to play in all three Tests during which he proved his worth and demonstrated how crucial his long-range kicking can be. He came within inches of scoring in the second minute of the first test, collecting Owen Farrell's pass in the left corner after a free-flowing Lions move, but was denied by a tackle from Israel Dagg. In the same game, he was involved in one of the greatest Lions tries ever scored as he exchanged passes with Jonathan Davies, who set up Sean O'Brien to cross the whitewash after Liam Williams' break.

Daly played all 80 minutes of the Lions' remarkable come-from-behind win in the second test, before his penalty just after half-time in the third helped bring the Lions back within three points and heap pressure on the All Blacks in Auckland, as the match eventually finished 15–15 to draw the series in historic fashion.

One 8 May 2025, Elliot Daly was selected for the Lions for the third time, when he was called up to be a member of the 2025 British & Irish Lions tour to Australia. In July 2025, he was ruled out of the rest of the tour after sustaining a forearm injury during a 52–12 victory over the Queensland Reds.

== Career statistics ==
=== List of international tries ===
No.	Date	Venue	Opponent	Score	Result	Competition
1	19 November 2016	Twickenham Stadium, London, England	Fiji	12–0	58–15	2016 end-of-year rugby union internationals
2	11 February 2017	Millennium Stadium, Cardiff, Wales	Wales	19–16	21–16	2017 Six Nations Championship
3	26 February 2017	Twickenham Stadium, London, England	Italy	15–10	36–15	2017 Six Nations Championship
4	18 November 2017	Twickenham Stadium, London, England	Australia	11–3	30–6	2017 end-of-year rugby union internationals
5	25 November 2017	Twickenham Stadium, London, England	Samoa	27–7	48–14	2017 end-of-year rugby union internationals
6	25 November 2017	Twickenham Stadium, London, England	Samoa	41–14	48–14	2017 end-of-year rugby union internationals
7	17 March 2018	Twickenham Stadium, London, England	Ireland	5–14	15–24	2018 Six Nations Championship
8	17 March 2018	Twickenham Stadium, London, England	Ireland	10–24	15–24	2018 Six Nations Championship
9	9 June 2018	Ellis Park Stadium, Johannesburg, South Africa	South Africa	15–3	39–42	2018 England rugby union tour of South Africa
10	24 November 2018	Twickenham Stadium, London, England	Australia	18–13	37–18	2018 end-of-year rugby union internationals
11	2 February 2019	Aviva Stadium, Dublin, Ireland	Ireland	12–10	32–20	2019 Six Nations Championship
12	24 August 2019	Twickenham Stadium, London, England	Ireland	13–10	57–15	2019 Rugby World Cup warm-up matches
13	5 October 2019	Tokyo Stadium, Tokyo, Japan	Argentina	10–3	39–10	2019 Rugby World Cup
14	23 February 2020	Twickenham Stadium, London, England	Ireland	5–0	24–12	2020 Six Nations Championship
15	7 March 2020	Twickenham Stadium, London, England	Wales	15–6	33–30	2020 Six Nations Championship
16	14 November 2020	Twickenham Stadium, London, England	Georgia	24–0	40–0	Autumn Nations Cup
17	13 February 2021	Twickenham Stadium, London, England	Italy	39–18	41–18	2021 Six Nations Championship
18	13 February 2022	Stadio Olimpico, Rome, Italy	Italy	26–0	33–0	2022 Six Nations Championship
19	3 February 2024	Stadio Olimpico, Rome, Italy	Italy	10–8	27–24	2024 Six Nations Championship
20	8 February 2025	Twickenham Stadium, London, England	France	24–25	26–25	2025 Six Nations Championship

as of 8 February 2025

== Honours ==
England

- 3× Six Nations Championship winner: 2016, 2017, 2020
- 1× Grand Slam winner: 2016
- 2× Triple Crown winner: 2016, 2020
- 1× Rugby World Cup runner-up: 2019
- 1x Rugby World Cup third place: 2023

Saracens

- 1× Premiership winner: 2023
- 1x Premiership runner-up: 2022
- 1× RFU Championship winner: 2021

Wasps

- 1x Premiership runner-up: 2017
