= Nathan Hughes =

England international rugby union player

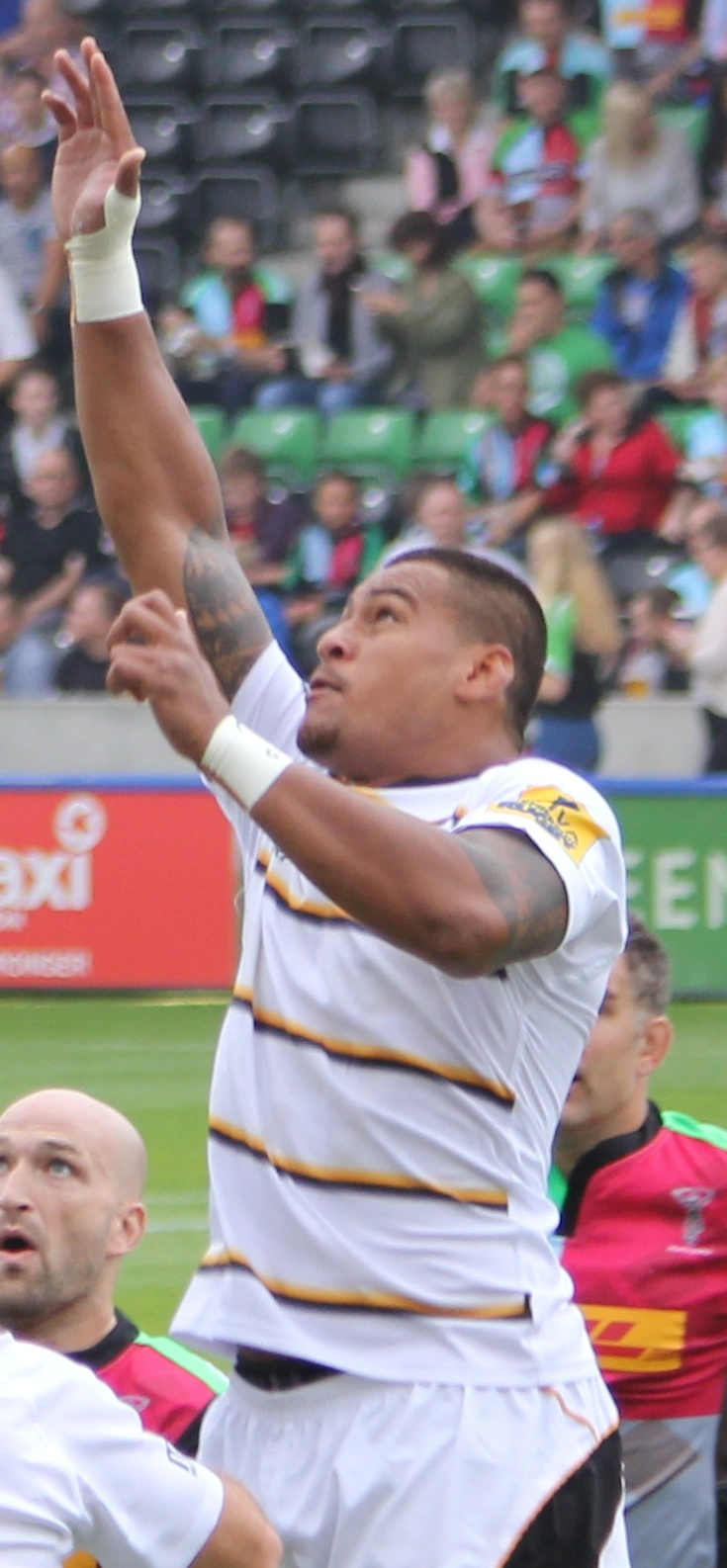
- Hughes in action for Wasps against Harlequins
- Born: Nathan Hughes; 10 June 1991 (age 35) Lautoka, Fiji
- Height: 1.96 m (6 ft 5 in)
- Weight: 126 kg (19 st 12 lb; 278 lb)
- School: St Thomas High School; Kelston Boys' High School

Rugby union career
- Position(s): Number 8, Lock
- Current team: Racing 92
Senior career
Years	Team	Apps	(Points)
2011–2013	Auckland	17	(10)
2013–2019	Wasps	125	(160)
2019–2022	Bristol Bears	54	(50)
2022	→Hartpury University (loan)	1	(5)
2022	→Bath (loan)	7	(0)
2022–2025	Black Rams Tokyo	34	(115)
2025	→Urayasu D-Rocks (loan)	5	(15)
2025–	Racing 92	27	(55)
- Correct as of 17 October 2026
International career
Years	Team	Apps	(Points)
2016–2019	England	22	(5)
2026–	Fiji	2	(0)
- Correct as of 21 November 2026

Nathan William Jeremy Hughes (born 10 June 1991) is a professional rugby union player who is currently playing for Racing 92 in France’s Top 14. He plays as a flanker, number 8 or at lock.

Born in Fiji, Hughes qualified to play for England on residency and won 22 caps between 2016 and 2019. In 2026 he switched to represent the nation of his birth Fiji.

== Career ==
In 2009, Hughes was scouted by Athens Henare, the head of the PE department at New Zealand's Kelston Boys' High School, during Kelston's tour of Fiji and went to the school on a partial scholarship. In his first year, Hughes scooped the Team Player of the Year Award. He also made the Auckland Under-18s team and followed this up by making the Auckland Under-20s team while still playing for Kelston Boys' High School 1st XV. This resulted in him joining the Auckland High Performance Academy.

In January 2012, Hughes returned to Fiji to take part in the invitational Uprising 7s, missing the New Zealand 7s team trials for the chance to represent Fiji. He played for the Auckland Invitational side coached by former Fiji 15s coach, Wayne Pivac. He also helped his Auckland side win the NZ 7s Championships in 2012.

In February 2013, Hughes was selected by the then Fiji 15s coach, Inoke Male to join the Fiji Warriors team for the 2013 Pacific Rugby Cup. He was named the Vice-captain of the Warriors' team which was skippered by winger Nemani Nadolo who went on to sign for Leicester Tigers.

In March 2013, Hughes signed for English Premiership side, Wasps. In March 2015, during the 2014–15 season, Hughes was red carded (a career first) in the game against Northampton Saints after his shin collided with George North's head after he had scored a try, knocking him unconscious. He was handed a 3-week suspension but an appeal was lodged and he was cleared. His red card and three-week ban were judged to have been predicated more on the injury to North than the intent of the challenge.

In January 2019, it was announced that Hughes had signed a three-year contract with Bristol Bears. In his first season at the club he scored a try during their EPCR Challenge Cup quarter-final victory over Dragons RFC. Hughes missed the final against Toulon due to a rib injury.

In January 2022, having played some games for Hartpury University R.F.C., Hughes joined Bath on a short-term loan, winning the Player of the Match award in his first game in which Bath defeated Premiership champions Harlequins.

In 2022 Hughes joined Japanese side Black Rams Tokyo. After three years in Asia, Hughes signed for Racing 92 and in his first campaign with the club he started in their 2025–26 Top 14 season semi-final defeat against Toulouse.

== International career ==
=== England ===
In April 2014, Hughes confirmed he was considering his international allegiance as he was eligible for Fiji through birthplace, Samoa due to ancestry and qualified to represent England on residency in 2016. In August 2016, Hughes was named in the provisional 45-man elite player squad (EPS) England squad by coach Eddie Jones for their pre-season training camp. On 30 September 2016 he was named in the training squad for the Autumn Internationals.

On 12 November 2016, Hughes made his Test debut for England, coming off the bench in the 53rd minute as a replacement for Tom Wood during a 2016 autumn international against South Africa. He played in their next match against Fiji and then made his first start at international level against Australia.

Hughes was included in the squad for the 2017 Six Nations Championship and featured in all five of their fixtures as England retained the title. Later that year Hughes scored his only try for England during a 2017 autumn international against Argentina.

Hughes was part of the side that were runners-up in the 2019 Six Nations Championship and played in the last round draw with Scotland. This proved to be his last appearance for England. In total he won twenty-two caps between 2016 and 2019.

=== Fiji ===
On 7 November 2026, Hughes made his debut for Fiji starting in a defeat against France in the 2026 Nations Championship.

On the 21 November, Hughes was in the starting team for Fiji against Italy in the 2026 Nations Championship.

=== International tries ===
As of 7 July 2019

Try	Opposing team	Location	Venue	Competition	Date	Result	Score
1	Argentina	London, England	Twickenham Stadium	2017 Autumn Internationals	11 November 2017	Win	21 – 8

== Personal life ==
Hughes was born and raised in Lautoka, Fiji. He attended St Thomas High School in Lautoka and represented the school in hockey, which he played throughout most of his childhood. Hughes' father William Hughes represented Fiji at hockey. His uncle, Asaeli Hughes, is a dual international having represented Fiji at both 15s rugby and basketball. Married to Alanna Hughes. Nathan has four children, two from a previous marriage and two with his current wife.

== Honours ==
England

- Six Nations Championship: 2017

Bristol Bears

- EPCR Challenge Cup: 2019–2020
