= Ornel Gega =

- Born: Ornel Gega; 24 March 1990 (age 36) Lezhë, Albania
- Height: 1.80 m (5 ft 11 in)
- Weight: 103 kg (227 lb; 16 st 3 lb)

Rugby union career
- Position: Hooker
Amateur team(s)
| Years | Team | Apps | (Points) |
| 2005−2008 | Rugby Paese | | |
| 2008−2010 | Treviso | | |
Senior career
| Years | Team | Apps | (Points) |
| 2010–2013 | Petrarca | 46 | (40) |
| 2013–2015 | Mogliano | 37 | (5) |
| 2015–2020 | Benetton | 24 | (10) |
- Correct as of 12 February 2016
International career
| Years | Team | Apps | (Points) |
| 2009−2010 | Italy Under 20 | 7 | (10) |
| 2014−2015 | Emerging Italy | 5 | (0) |
| 2016–2017 | Italy | 15 | (15) |
- Correct as of 27 June 2017
Coaching career
- Years: Team
- 2020–: Rugby Paese (assistant coach)

Ornel Gega (born 24 March 1990) is a retired Albanian-born Italian rugby union player. and his position was hooker.

From 2015 to 2020 he played for Benetton.

He was named in the Italian squad for the 2016 Six Nations Championship. He made his debut on 6 February against France He is the first Albanian-born rugby union player to have featured in a major international tournament, having played for Italy at the 2016 Six Nations Championship.

He had two outings during last season's tournament and has gone from strength to strength since then, figuring as a regular starter and producing a big display in November's victory over the Springboks.

In January 2017, he was included in the Italy squad for the 2017 Six Nations Championship, in a competition where he has played 2 games before, without scoring.

Gega faced a knee injury while preparing for the 6 Nations for which he had to undergo surgery. Due to the injury, he did not play during the 2017-2018 Rugby season.
