= Dries van Schalkwyk =

- Full name: Andries Johannes van Schalkwyk
- Born: 21 December 1984 (age 41) Bloemfontein, South Africa
- Height: 1.93 m (6 ft 4 in)
- Weight: 108 kg (238 lb; 17 st 0 lb)
- School: St. Andrew's School, Bloemfontein
- University: University of the Free State

Rugby union career
- Position(s): Number 8, Flanker
Youth career
- 2003–2005: Free State Cheetahs
Senior career
Years	Team	Apps	(Points)
2006	Free State Cheetahs	4	(5)
2006	Falcons	4	(0)
2007–2008	Boland Cavaliers	31	(35)
2009–2010	Blue Bulls	20	(10)
2009	→ Southern Kings	1	(0)
2011	Golden Lions XV	7	(20)
2011	Lions	1	(0)
2011	Golden Lions	1	(0)
2011	→ Leopards	1	(0)
2012	Free State XV	7	(0)
2012–2017	Zebre	94	(120)
2017–2019	Southern Kings	26	(15)
2018	Eastern Province Elephants	1	(5)
- Correct as of 4 May 2019
International career
Years	Team	Apps	(Points)
2016–2017	Italy	15	(5)
- Correct as of 27 June 2017

Andries Johannes van Schalkwyk (born 21 December 1984) is a South African-born rugby union player who played internationally for Italy in 2016 and 2017. His position is number 8 and he last played for the Southern Kings in the Pro14.

He was named in the Italian squad for the 2016 Six Nations Championship.

In 2009, he played for Southern Kings against British & Irish Lions during 2009 tour.

In 2017, he rejoined Southern Kings for their entry into the Pro14.

== Zebre ==
In the 2012–13 Pro12 season, he played 19 matches, coming on as a substitute for 1, and scoring six tries. For 2013/2014 season he played 17 matches, coming on as substitute for 2 matches. In the 2014/2015 season he played 12 matches, coming on as substitute for 1. In the 2015-2016 season he played 13 matches, coming on as substitute for 1, scoring 6 tries. He was top try scorer for the season with teammate Kayle van Zyl 2nd top try scorer with 5 tries for Zebre. In the 2016/2017 season he played 9 matches, substituting for 1, scoring 5 tries and picking up 5 yellow cards. He did not renew his contract with Zebre at the end of the 2016–17 season. and signed with the Southern Kings.

== Southern Kings ==
Van Schalkwyk moves from Zebre to join the Southern Kings in Port Elizabeth on a two-year contract.
