= Noa Nakaitaci =

France international rugby union player (born 1990)

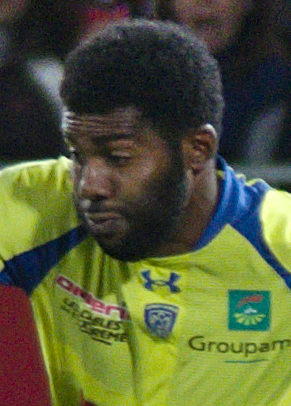
- Born: Noa Seru Nakaitaci; 11 July 1990 (age 36) Lautoka, Fiji
- Height: 1.90 m (6 ft 3 in)
- Weight: 97 kg (15 st 4 lb; 214 lb)

Rugby union career
- Position: Wing
- Current team: Toulon
Amateur team(s)
Years	Team	Apps	(Points)
- Lautoka RFC
Senior career
Years	Team	Apps	(Points)
2011–2018	Clermont	130	(220)
2018–2023	Lyon	83	(110)
2023-	Toulon	1	(0)
- Correct as of 18 October 2023
International career
Years	Team	Apps	(Points)
2009	Fiji U20	5	(20)
2015–	France	15	(10)
- Correct as of 10 December 2019

Noa Seru Nakaitaci (born 11 July 1990) is a Fiji-born rugby union player who plays on the wing for the France national rugby union team. He currently plays for Toulon in the Top 14.

He began his career in Fiji, playing for the national under-20 team, before moving to Clermont in 2011. He was selected to play for France in 2013 against the All Blacks.

Noa was raised in Lautoka and in 2009, he was picked by the Lautoka Rugby coach to join Lautoka from the Lautoka under-23 team and into the main team. He also captained the Fiji Schoolboys to Samoa for the FORU championships that year where they won, beating the hosts Samoa. He played for Lautoka for a short while before getting a contract to play in France.
