= Giorgio Bronzini =

Italian rugby union player

- Born: 20 April 1990 (age 36) Viadana, Lombardy
- Height: 1.80 m (5 ft 11 in)
- Weight: 87 kg (13 st 10 lb; 192 lb)
- Notable relative: Andrea Bronzini (brother)

Rugby union career
- Position: Scrum-half
- Current team: Viadana
Youth career
- Viadana
Senior career
Years	Team	Apps	(Points)
2009-10	Viadana	1	(0)
2010-11	Gran Ducato	5	(0)
2011	→Aironi	2	(0)
2011-12	Aironi	6	(0)
2012-14	Viadana	38	(30)
2014-16	Rovigo	36	(35)
2016-19	Benetton	37	(5)
2019-2021	Viadana	11	(5)
- Correct as of 22 November 2016
International career
Years	Team	Apps	(Points)
2013-2016	Emerging Italy	6	(6)
2016	Italy	7	(0)
2018	Italy Sevens	10	(10)
- Correct as of 12 March 2017
Coaching career
- Years: Team
- 2021–: Viadana Academy (Head Coach)

Giorgio Bronzini (born 20 April 1990) is a retired Italian rugby union player. His usual position was a scrum-half and he currently is named coach for Viadana Academy.

From 2016 to 2019 he played with Italian Pro14 team Benetton.

From 2013 to 2016 Bronzini was named with Emerging Italy and in 2016 with Italy squad. He represented Italy on 10 occasions in 2016. In 2018 he played also with Italy Sevens.
