= Julien Le Devedec =

French rugby union player (born 1986)

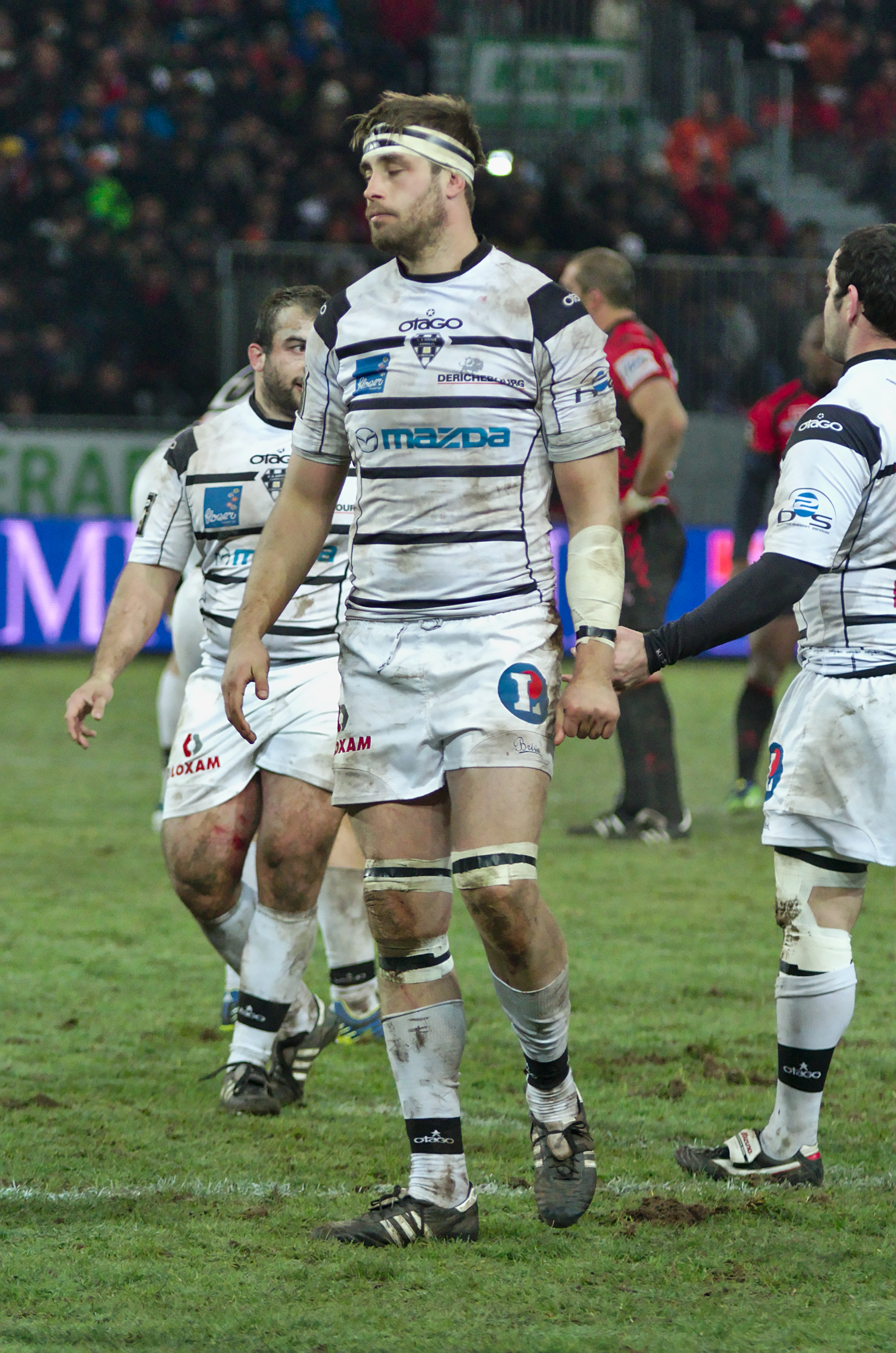
- Born: Julien Le Devedec; 4 June 1986 (age 40) Sainte-Foy-la-Grande, France
- Height: 2.00 m (6 ft 6 1/2 in)
- Weight: 112 kg (17 st 9 lb; 247 lb)

Rugby union career
- Position(s): Lock, Number 8
Senior career
Years	Team	Apps	(Points)
2005–2010	Toulouse	26	(0)
2010–2014	CA Brive	102	(10)
2014-2016	Union Bordeaux Begles	44	(0)
2016-18	CA Brive	38	(10)
2018-2019	Montpellier Herault Rugby	18	(0)
2020-	Provence Rugby		
International career
Years	Team	Apps	(Points)
2016–	France	11	(0)

Julien Le Devedec (born 6 June 1986 in Sainte-Foy-la-Grande, France) is a French rugby union footballer, currently playing for Provence Rugby in the Pro D2. His usual position is at Lock or Number 8. Prior to joining CA Brive he played for Stade Toulousain where he won the 2007-08 Top 14 and the 2004-05 Heineken Cup and the 2009-10 Heineken Cup.

== Honours ==
- Top 14, 2008 with Stade Toulousain
- Heineken Cup, 2005 and 2010 with Stade Toulousain
