= Rémi Lamerat =

French rugby union player (born 1990)

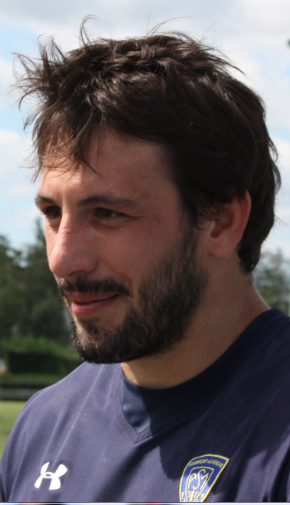
- Born: 14 January 1990 (age 36) Sainte-Foy-la-Grande, France
- Height: 1.84 m (6 ft 1/2 in)
- Weight: 105 kg (16 st 7 lb; 231 lb)

Rugby union career
- Position: Centre
Senior career
| Years | Team | Apps | (Points) |
| 2008–2011 | Toulouse | 19 | (20) |
| 2011–2016 | Castres | 91 | (60) |
| 2016–2019 | Clermont | 53 | (30) |
| 2019–2023 | Bordeaux Bègles | 58 | (40) |
International career
| Years | Team | Apps | (Points) |
| 2014–2018 | France | 19 | (10) |

Rémi Lamerat ([ʁe.mi la.mə.ʁa]; born 14 January 1990) is a French former rugby union player. His position was centre. He began his career with Stade Toulousain before moving to Castres in 2012, then onto Clermont Auvergne in 2016, and then to Union Bordeaux Bègles in 2019.

After retiring from professional rugby in 2023, Lamerat transitioned into the wine industry, a field he had been passionate about alongside his rugby career. He expressed a desire to continue indulging in his passion for wine, indicating a shift from sports to viticulture.
