= 2016 Six Nations Championship =

Rugby union competition in Europe

- Date: 6 February – 19 March 2016
- Countries: England; France; Ireland; Italy; Scotland; Wales

Tournament statistics
- Champions: England (27th title)
- Grand Slam: England (13th title)
- Triple Crown: England (25th title)
- Matches played: 15
- Attendance: 1,034,521 (68,968 per match)
- Tries scored: 71 (4.73 per match)
- Top point scorer: (England) Owen Farrell (69)
- Top try scorer: (Wales) George North (4)
- Player of the tournament: (Scotland) Stuart Hogg
- Official website: Six Nations Website

The 2016 Six Nations Championship, known as the 2016 RBS 6 Nations due to the tournament's sponsorship by The Royal Bank of Scotland, was the 17th series of the Six Nations Championship, the annual northern hemisphere rugby union championship.

It was contested by England, France, defending champions Ireland, Italy, Scotland and Wales. Including the competition's previous incarnations as the Home Nations Championship and Five Nations Championship, it was the 122nd edition of the tournament.

England won the Championship on 13 March with a game to play, winning their first Championship since 2011. On 19 March, they earned the Grand Slam for the 13th time, their first since 2003.

The 2016 Championship was the first time in the Six Nations era that both the champions and the wooden spoon "winners" had been decided before the final day, as Italy were confirmed to finish in sixth place for the 11th time on 13 March with Scotland's victory over France. Italy went on to lose their final match, and were thus whitewashed for the seventh time. The 29 tries conceded by Italy was also a Championship record, exceeding the 25 tries they conceded in 2000 and 2003.

== Participants ==
Nation	Stadium			Head coach	Captain
Nation	Home stadium	Capacity	Location	Head coach	Captain
England	Twickenham Stadium	82,000	London	(Australia) Eddie Jones	Dylan Hartley
France	Stade de France	81,338	Saint-Denis	(France) Guy Novès	Guilhem Guirado
Ireland	Aviva Stadium	51,700	Dublin	(New Zealand) Joe Schmidt	Rory Best
Italy	Stadio Olimpico	73,261	Rome	(France) Jacques Brunel	Sergio Parisse
Scotland	Murrayfield Stadium	67,144	Edinburgh	(New Zealand) Vern Cotter	Greig Laidlaw
Wales	Millennium Stadium	74,500	Cardiff	(New Zealand) Warren Gatland	Sam Warburton*

* Except the final match at home against Italy, when Warburton was ruled out due to concussion protocol. Dan Lydiate took his place as captain, with championship vice-captain Alun Wyn Jones also ruled out injured.

== Story of the tournament ==
=== Round 1 (6–7 February) ===
The tournament started with a surprisingly narrow 23–21 win for France over Italy. At one point, Italy had led 18–10 and then 21–20, but a late penalty from Jules Plisson gave France the points. The same day, another tight game saw England retain the Calcutta Cup in a narrow 15–9 win over Scotland, with tries from George Kruis and Jack Nowell. The following day, two of the three tournament favourites, Ireland and Wales, drew 16–16 in Dublin. Ireland had led 13–0 before Wales battled back to lead 16–13. Johnny Sexton's late penalty gave Ireland a share of the spoils.

=== Round 2 (13–14 February) ===
Ireland's defence of the title was damaged further in Week 2 when they were beaten 10–9 in a second successive narrow victory for France. Ireland had led 9–3 from before half-time, but Maxime Médard's 69th minute converted try proved to be the winner. Another comeback later that day saw Wales beat Scotland 27–23 in Cardiff. Scotland had led 13–10 at half time, but tries from Jamie Roberts and George North gave Wales a 27–16 lead before a late Scotland score. On Sunday, England easily beat Italy 40–9 after a tight first half, with Jonathan Joseph scoring a hat-trick of tries.

=== Round 3 (26–27 February) ===
In the Friday evening kick-off, Wales maintained their title hopes with a 19–10 win over France. Another George North try helped them to a comfortable 19–3 lead before a France try in the last minute. On Saturday, Scotland won their first Six Nations game in 10 attempts, winning 36–20 in Rome with Greig Laidlaw kicking 21 points. Ireland's title hopes were extinguished when they were beaten 21–10 by England at Twickenham; Ireland had led 10–6 early in the second half, but conceded 15 unanswered points in 13 minutes with tries by Anthony Watson and Mike Brown.

=== Round 4 (12–13 March) ===
Entering the fourth round of matches, the England-Wales game was touted as a Championship decider, although France – a point behind Wales and two behind England – still had an outside chance of winning it. The first match of the weekend saw Ireland trounce Italy 58–15, running in nine tries. England then beat Wales 25–21 in a thrilling encounter at Twickenham; England had led 25–7 with less than 10 minutes remaining before two converted Wales tries made it a tense ending. England thus won the Triple Crown, and the next day won the Championship outright, as France, needing to win to take the tournament to a final week, lost 29–18 to Scotland in Edinburgh, the Scots' first win over the French in 10 years. In addition to guaranteeing that England would win the tournament, Scotland's victory over France also guaranteed that Italy would finish last and "win" the wooden spoon as a result.

=== Round 5 (19 March) ===
All three matches were played on the same day in the last round, with England needing to win in Paris to complete the Grand Slam for the first time since 2003. In the first match, Wales scored nine tries to easily beat Italy 67–14 in Cardiff, effectively whitewashing Italy; they had lost all five of their matches. Ireland then beat Scotland 35–25 in Dublin in an open game where the sides shared seven tries. In the final game in Paris, England scored two early tries through Danny Care and Dan Cole but the excellent kicking of Maxime Machenaud – who scored all of his side's points with seven penalties – kept France in the game until two late Owen Farrell penalties stretched England's lead to 31–21, enough to win the game and the Grand Slam, and to leave Farrell the leading points scorer in the Championship.

== Table ==
Pos	Team	Pld	W	D	L	PF	PA	PD	T	Pts
1	England	5	5	0	0	132	70	+62	13	10
2	Wales	5	3	1	1	150	88	+62	17	7
3	Ireland	5	2	1	2	128	87	+41	15	5
4	Scotland	5	2	0	3	122	115	+7	11	4
5	France	5	2	0	3	82	109	−27	7	4
6	Italy	5	0	0	5	79	224	−145	8	0

Source: RBS 6 Nations Table (accessed 19 March 2016)

== Fixtures ==
=== Round 1 ===
6 February 2016
15:25 CET (UTC+1)

France	23–21	Italy
Try: Vakatawa 13' m Chouly 32' m Bonneval 59' c Con: Plisson (1/1) 59'; Pen: Plisson (2/2) 68', 75'	Report	Try: Parisse 25' m Canna 45' c Con: Canna (1/2) 46'; Pen: Canna (1/2) 43'; Haimona (1/1) 73'; Drop: Canna (1/1) 7'

Stade de France, Paris
Attendance: 64,000
Referee: JP Doyle (England)

FB	15	Maxime Médard	(substituted off) 77'
RW	14	Hugo Bonneval
OC	13	Gaël Fickou	(substituted off) 56'
IC	12	Jonathan Danty
LW	11	Virimi Vakatawa
FH	10	Jules Plisson
SH	9	Sébastien Bézy	(substituted off) 68'
N8	8	Louis Picamoles	(substituted off) 15'
OF	7	Damien Chouly
BF	6	Wenceslas Lauret
RL	5	Yoann Maestri
LL	4	Paul Jedrasiak	(substituted off) 72'
TP	3	Rabah Slimani	(substituted off) 50'
HK	2	Guilhem Guirado (c)
LP	1	Eddy Ben Arous	(substituted off) 50'
Replacements:
HK	16	Camille Chat
PR	17	Uini Atonio	(substituted in) 50'
PR	18	Jefferson Poirot	(substituted in) 50'
LK	19	Alexandre Flanquart	(substituted in) 72'
FL	20	Yacouba Camara	(substituted in) 15'
SH	21	Maxime Machenaud	(substituted in) 68'
FH	22	Jean-Marc Doussain	(substituted in) 77'
CE	23	Maxime Mermoz	(substituted in) 56'
Coach:
(France) Guy Novès

FB	15	David Odiete	(substituted off) 55'
RW	14	Leonardo Sarto
OC	13	Michele Campagnaro
IC	12	Gonzalo Garcia	(substituted off) 70'
LW	11	Mattia Bellini
FH	10	Carlo Canna	(substituted off) 77'
SH	9	Edoardo Gori
N8	8	Sergio Parisse (c)
OF	7	Alessandro Zanni	12' to 20'		(substituted off) 66'
BF	6	Francesco Minto
RL	5	Marco Fuser
LL	4	George Biagi	(substituted off) 43'
TP	3	Lorenzo Cittadini	(substituted off) 65'
HK	2	Ornel Gega	(substituted off) 56'
LP	1	Andrea Lovotti	(substituted off) 65'
Replacements:
HK	16	Davide Giazzon	(substituted in) 56'
PR	17	Matteo Zanusso	(substituted in) 65'
PR	18	Martin Castrogiovanni	(substituted in) 65'
LK	19	Valerio Bernabò	(substituted in) 43'
N8	20	Dries Van Schalkwyk	(substituted in) 12'	(substituted off) 20'	(substituted in) 66'
SH	21	Guglielmo Palazzani	(substituted in) 77'
CE	22	Kelly Haimona	(substituted in) 70'
FB	23	Luke McLean	(substituted in) 55'
Coach:
(France) Jacques Brunel

Man of the Match:
Virimi Vakatawa (France)

Touch judges:
George Clancy (Ireland)
Federico Anselmi (Argentina)
Television match official:
Graham Hughes (England)

Notes:

- Sébastien Bezy, Yacouba Camara, Jonathan Danty, Paul Jedrasiak, Jefferson Poirot, Virimi Vakatawa (all France), Mattia Bellini, Ornel Gega, Andrea Lovotti, David Odiete, Dries van Schalkwyk and Matteo Zanusso (all Italy) made their international debuts.
- France retained the Giuseppe Garibaldi Trophy for the third consecutive year.

6 February 2016
16:50 GMT (UTC+0)

Scotland	9–15	England
Pen: Laidlaw (3/4) 16', 37', 68'	Report	Try: Kruis 13' c Nowell 50' m Con: Farrell (1/2) 14'; Pen: Farrell (1/2) 62'

Murrayfield Stadium, Edinburgh
Attendance: 67,144
Referee: John Lacey (Ireland)

FB	15	Stuart Hogg
RW	14	Sean Maitland
OC	13	Mark Bennett
IC	12	Matt Scott
LW	11	Tommy Seymour	(substituted off) 65'
FH	10	Finn Russell
SH	9	Greig Laidlaw (c)
N8	8	David Denton
OF	7	John Hardie
BF	6	John Barclay	(substituted off) 58'
RL	5	Jonny Gray	(substituted off) 69'
LL	4	Richie Gray
TP	3	WP Nel	(substituted off) 69'
HK	2	Ross Ford	(substituted off) 64'
LP	1	Alasdair Dickinson	(substituted off) 57'
Replacements:
HK	16	Stuart McInally	(substituted in) 64'
PR	17	Gordon Reid	(substituted in) 57'
PR	18	Zander Fagerson	(substituted in) 69'
LK	19	Tim Swinson	(substituted in) 69'
FL	20	Blair Cowan	(substituted in) 58'
FH	21	Sam Hidalgo-Clyne
FH	22	Duncan Weir
CE	23	Duncan Taylor	(substituted in) 65'
Coach:
(New Zealand) Vern Cotter

FB	15	Mike Brown
RW	14	Anthony Watson
OC	13	Jonathan Joseph
IC	12	Owen Farrell
LW	11	Jack Nowell
FH	10	George Ford
SH	9	Danny Care	(substituted off) 54'
N8	8	Billy Vunipola
OF	7	James Haskell
BF	6	Chris Robshaw	(substituted off) 69'
RL	5	George Kruis
LL	4	Joe Launchbury	(substituted off) 46'
TP	3	Dan Cole
HK	2	Dylan Hartley (c)	(substituted off) 76'
LP	1	Joe Marler	(substituted off) 48'
Replacements:
HK	16	Jamie George	(substituted in) 76'
PR	17	Mako Vunipola	(substituted in) 48'
PR	18	Paul Hill
LK	19	Courtney Lawes	(substituted in) 46'
FL	20	Jack Clifford	(substituted in) 69'
SH	21	Ben Youngs	(substituted in) 54'
CE	22	Ollie Devoto
FB	23	Alex Goode
Coach:
(Australia) Eddie Jones

Man of the Match:
Billy Vunipola (England)

Touch judges:
Romain Poite (France)
Stuart Berry (South Africa)
Television match official:
George Ayoub (Australia)

Notes:

- Zander Fagerson (Scotland) and Jack Clifford (England) made their international debuts.
- England retained the Calcutta Cup.

7 February 2016
15:00 GMT (UTC+0)

Ireland	16–16	Wales
Try: Murray 26' c Con: Sexton (1/1) 27'; Pen: Sexton (3/3) 4', 13', 74'	Report	Try: Faletau 37' c Con: Priestland (1/1) 38'; Pen: Priestland (3/3) 31', 46', 72'

Aviva Stadium, Dublin
Attendance: 51,700
Referee: Jérôme Garcès (France)

FB	15	Simon Zebo
RW	14	Andrew Trimble
OC	13	Jared Payne
IC	12	Robbie Henshaw
LW	11	Keith Earls	(substituted off) 71'
FH	10	Johnny Sexton	(substituted off) 75'
SH	9	Conor Murray
N8	8	Jamie Heaslip
OF	7	Tommy O'Donnell	(substituted off) 48'
BF	6	CJ Stander
RL	5	Devin Toner
LL	4	Mike McCarthy	(substituted off) 63'
TP	3	Nathan White	(substituted off) 63'
HK	2	Rory Best (c)	(substituted off) 75'
LP	1	Jack McGrath
Replacements:
HK	16	Seán Cronin	(substituted in) 75'
PR	17	James Cronin
PR	18	Tadhg Furlong	(substituted in) 63'
LK	19	Donnacha Ryan	(substituted in) 63'
FL	20	Rhys Ruddock	(substituted in) 48'
SH	21	Kieran Marmion
FH	22	Ian Madigan	(substituted in) 75'
WG	23	Dave Kearney	(substituted in) 71'
Coach:
(New Zealand) Joe Schmidt

FB	15	Liam Williams
RW	14	George North
OC	13	Jonathan Davies
IC	12	Jamie Roberts
LW	11	Tom James
FH	10	Dan Biggar	(substituted off) 21'
SH	9	Gareth Davies	(substituted off) 71'
N8	8	Taulupe Faletau
OF	7	Justin Tipuric
BF	6	Sam Warburton (c)	(substituted off) 72'
RL	5	Alun Wyn Jones
LL	4	Luke Charteris	(substituted off) 61'
TP	3	Samson Lee	(substituted off) 57'
HK	2	Scott Baldwin	(substituted off) 63'
LP	1	Rob Evans	(substituted off) 52'
Replacements:
HK	16	Ken Owens	(substituted in) 63'
PR	17	Gethin Jenkins	(substituted in) 52'
PR	18	Tomas Francis	(substituted in) 57'
LK	19	Bradley Davies	(substituted in) 61'
FL	20	Dan Lydiate	(substituted in) 72'
SH	21	Lloyd Williams	(substituted in) 71'
FH	22	Rhys Priestland	(substituted in) 21'
WG	23	Alex Cuthbert
Coach:
(New Zealand) Warren Gatland

Man of the Match:
CJ Stander (Ireland)

Touch judges:
Glen Jackson (New Zealand)
Ben O’Keeffe (New Zealand)
Television match official:
Graham Hughes (England)

Notes:

- CJ Stander (Ireland) made his international debut.
- Bradley Davies (Wales) earned his 50th test cap.
- This was the first time that Ireland and Wales had drawn since the 21–21 draw in Cardiff during the 1991 Five Nations Championship.

=== Round 2 ===
13 February 2016
15:25 CET (UTC+1)

France	10–9	Ireland
Try: Médard 69' c Con: Plisson (1/1) 70'; Pen: Plisson (1/2) 31'	Report	Pen: Sexton (3/3) 14', 28', 38'

Stade de France, Paris
Attendance: 78,000
Referee: Jaco Peyper (South Africa)

FB	15	Maxime Médard
RW	14	Teddy Thomas	(substituted off) 44'
OC	13	Maxime Mermoz
IC	12	Jonathan Danty	(substituted off) 76'
LW	11	Virimi Vakatawa
FH	10	Jules Plisson
SH	9	Sébastien Bézy	(substituted off) 56'
N8	8	Damien Chouly
OF	7	Yacouba Camara	(substituted off) 67'
BF	6	Wenceslas Lauret
RL	5	Yoann Maestri	(substituted off) 58'
LL	4	Alexandre Flanquart
TP	3	Uini Atonio	(substituted off) 44'
HK	2	Guilhem Guirado (c)	47' to 57'		(substituted off) 73'
LP	1	Jefferson Poirot	(substituted off) 44'	(substituted in) 73'
Replacements:
HK	16	Camille Chat	(substituted in) 47'	(substituted off) 57'	(substituted in) 73'
PR	17	Rabah Slimani	(substituted in) 44'
PR	18	Eddy Ben Arous	(substituted in) 44'	(substituted off) 73'
LK	19	Paul Jedrasiak	(substituted in) 58'
N8	20	Loann Goujon	(substituted in) 67'
SH	21	Maxime Machenaud	(substituted in) 56'
FH	22	Jean-Marc Doussain	(substituted in) 76'
WG	23	Hugo Bonneval	(substituted in) 44'
Coach:
(France) Guy Novès

FB	15	Rob Kearney
RW	14	Andrew Trimble
OC	13	Jared Payne
IC	12	Robbie Henshaw
LW	11	Dave Kearney	(substituted off) 29'
FH	10	Johnny Sexton	(substituted off) 69'
SH	9	Conor Murray
N8	8	Jamie Heaslip
OF	7	Seán O'Brien	(substituted off) 19'
BF	6	CJ Stander
RL	5	Devin Toner
LL	4	Mike McCarthy	34' to 40'		(substituted off) 62'
TP	3	Nathan White	(substituted off) 62'
HK	2	Rory Best (c)	(substituted off) 71'
LP	1	Jack McGrath	(substituted off) 73'
Replacements:
HK	16	Richardt Strauss	(substituted in) 71'
PR	17	James Cronin	(substituted in) 73'
PR	18	Tadhg Furlong	(substituted in) 62'
LK	19	Donnacha Ryan	(substituted in) 34'	(substituted off) 40'	(substituted in) 62'
FL	20	Tommy O'Donnell	(substituted in) 19'
SH	21	Eoin Reddan
FH	22	Ian Madigan	(substituted in) 69'
WG	23	Fergus McFadden	(substituted in) 29'
Coach:
(New Zealand) Joe Schmidt

Man of the Match:
Guilhem Guirado (France)

Touch judges:
Nigel Owens (Wales)
Stuart Berry (South Africa)
Television match official:
George Ayoub (Australia)

Notes:

- Camille Chat (France) made his international debut.
- This was France's first victory over Ireland since their 26–22 win during the 2011 Rugby World Cup warm-up matches.

13 February 2016
16:50 GMT (UTC+0)

Wales	27–23	Scotland
Try: G. Davies 6' c Roberts 64' c North 70' c Con: Biggar (3/3) 7', 64', 71'; Pen: Biggar (2/2) 34', 46'	Report	Try: Seymour 12' c Taylor 78' c Con: Laidlaw (1/1) 13'; Weir (1/1) 79'; Pen: Laidlaw (3/3) 30', 40', 54'

Millennium Stadium, Cardiff
Attendance: 74,160
Referee: George Clancy (Ireland)

FB	15	Liam Williams
RW	14	George North
OC	13	Jonathan Davies
IC	12	Jamie Roberts
LW	11	Tom James	(substituted off) 65'
FH	10	Dan Biggar	(substituted off) 75'
SH	9	Gareth Davies
N8	8	Taulupe Faletau
OF	7	Justin Tipuric	(substituted off) 61'
BF	6	Sam Warburton (c)
RL	5	Alun Wyn Jones
LL	4	Luke Charteris	(substituted off) 47'
TP	3	Samson Lee	(substituted off) 68'
HK	2	Scott Baldwin	(substituted off) 47'
LP	1	Rob Evans	(substituted off) 47'
Replacements:
HK	16	Ken Owens	(substituted in) 47'
PR	17	Gethin Jenkins	(substituted in) 47'
PR	18	Tomas Francis	(substituted in) 68'
LK	19	Bradley Davies	(substituted in) 47'
FL	20	Dan Lydiate	(substituted in) 61'
SH	21	Lloyd Williams
FH	22	Rhys Priestland	(substituted in) 75'
FB	23	Gareth Anscombe	(substituted in) 65'
Coach:
(New Zealand) Warren Gatland

FB	15	Stuart Hogg	(substituted off) 28'
RW	14	Tommy Seymour
OC	13	Mark Bennett
IC	12	Duncan Taylor
LW	11	Sean Lamont
FH	10	Finn Russell	(substituted off) 68'
SH	9	Greig Laidlaw (c)	(substituted off) 77'
N8	8	David Denton
OF	7	John Hardie
BF	6	John Barclay	(substituted off) 65'	(substituted in) 75'
RL	5	Jonny Gray	(substituted off) 68'
LL	4	Richie Gray
TP	3	WP Nel
HK	2	Ross Ford	(substituted off) 65'
LP	1	Alasdair Dickinson	(substituted off) 65'
Replacements:
HK	16	Stuart McInally	(substituted in) 65'
PR	17	Gordon Reid	(substituted in) 65'
PR	18	Zander Fagerson
LK	19	Tim Swinson	(substituted in) 68'
FL	20	Blair Cowan	(substituted in) 65'	(substituted off) 75'
SH	21	Sam Hidalgo-Clyne	(substituted in) 77'
FH	22	Duncan Weir	(substituted in) 68'
FB	23	Ruaridh Jackson	(substituted in) 28'
Coach:
(New Zealand) Vern Cotter

Man of the Match:
Jamie Roberts (Wales)

Touch judges:
John Lacey (Ireland)
Federico Anselmi (Argentina)
Television match official:
Graham Hughes (England)

Notes:

- Jonathan Davies (Wales) earned his 50th test cap.
- This was Scotland's ninth consecutive loss in the competition, their worst run of losses ever in the six-team format.

14 February 2016
15:00 CET (UTC+1)

Italy	9–40	England
Pen: Canna (3/4) 8', 18', 35'	Report	Try: Ford 24' m Joseph (3) 52' c, 57' c, 70' m Farrell 74' c Con: Farrell (3/5) 53', 58', 75'; Pen: Farrell (2/2) 11', 62'; Ford (1/1) 16'

Stadio Olimpico, Rome
Attendance: 70,000
Referee: Glen Jackson (New Zealand)

FB	15	Luke McLean
RW	14	Leonardo Sarto
OC	13	Michele Campagnaro
IC	12	Gonzalo Garcia	(substituted off) 32'
LW	11	Mattia Bellini
FH	10	Carlo Canna	(substituted off) 60'
SH	9	Edoardo Gori	(substituted off) 75'
N8	8	Sergio Parisse (c)
OF	7	Alessandro Zanni	(substituted off) 30'
BF	6	Francesco Minto
RL	5	Marco Fuser	(substituted off) 14'
LL	4	George Biagi
TP	3	Lorenzo Cittadini	(substituted off) 58'
HK	2	Ornel Gega	(substituted off) 41'
LP	1	Andrea Lovotti	(substituted off) 62'
Replacements:
HK	16	Davide Giazzon	(substituted in) 41'
PR	17	Matteo Zanusso	(substituted in) 62'
PR	18	Martin Castrogiovanni	(substituted in) 58'
LK	19	Valerio Bernabò	(substituted in) 14'
FL	20	Braam Steyn	(substituted in) 30'
SH	21	Guglielmo Palazzani	(substituted in) 75'
FH	22	Edoardo Padovani	(substituted in) 60'
CE	23	Andrea Pratichetti	(substituted in) 32'
Coach:
(France) Jacques Brunel

FB	15	Mike Brown			(substituted off) 69'
RW	14	Anthony Watson
OC	13	Jonathan Joseph
IC	12	Owen Farrell	(substituted off) 15'	(substituted in) 21'
LW	11	Jack Nowell
FH	10	George Ford
SH	9	Ben Youngs	(substituted off) 49'
N8	8	Billy Vunipola
OF	7	James Haskell	(substituted off) 54'
BF	6	Chris Robshaw	(substituted off) 62'
RL	5	George Kruis
LL	4	Courtney Lawes	(substituted off) 47'
TP	3	Dan Cole	(substituted off) 69'
HK	2	Dylan Hartley (c)	(substituted off) 69'
LP	1	Mako Vunipola	(substituted off) 47'
Replacements:
HK	16	Jamie George	(substituted in) 69'
PR	17	Joe Marler	(substituted in) 47'
PR	18	Paul Hill	(substituted in) 69'
LK	19	Joe Launchbury	(substituted in) 47'
LK	20	Maro Itoje	(substituted in) 54'
FL	21	Jack Clifford	(substituted in) 62'
SH	22	Danny Care	(substituted in) 49'
FB	23	Alex Goode	(substituted in) 15'	(substituted off) 21'	(substituted in) 69'
Coach:
(Australia) Eddie Jones

Man of the Match:
Ben Youngs (England)

Touch judges:
Jérôme Garcès (France)
Ben O'Keeffe (New Zealand)
Television match official:
George Ayoub (Australia)

Notes:

- Braam Steyn and Edoardo Padovani (both Italy), Paul Hill and Maro Itoje (both England) made their international debuts.

=== Round 3 ===
26 February 2016
20:05 GMT (UTC+0)

Wales	19–10	France
Try: North 45'; Con: Biggar (1/1) 47'; Pen: Biggar (4/5) 21', 30', 42', 65'	Report	Try: Guirado 78'; Con: Trinh-Duc (1/1) 79'; Pen: Plisson (1/2) 33'

Millennium Stadium, Cardiff
Attendance: 74,160
Referee: Wayne Barnes (England)

FB	15	Liam Williams	(substituted off) 73'
RW	14	Alex Cuthbert
OC	13	Jonathan Davies
IC	12	Jamie Roberts
LW	11	George North
FH	10	Dan Biggar	(substituted off) 70'
SH	9	Gareth Davies	(substituted off) 76'
N8	8	Taulupe Faletau
OF	7	Sam Warburton (c)
BF	6	Dan Lydiate	(substituted off) 76'
RL	5	Alun Wyn Jones	(substituted off) 76'
LL	4	Bradley Davies
TP	3	Samson Lee	(substituted off) 66'
HK	2	Scott Baldwin	(substituted off) 66'
LP	1	Rob Evans	(substituted off) 55'
Replacements:
HK	16	Ken Owens	(substituted in) 66'
PR	17	Gethin Jenkins	(substituted in) 55'
PR	18	Tomas Francis	(substituted in) 66'
LK	19	Jake Ball	(substituted in) 76'
FL	20	Justin Tipuric	(substituted in) 76'
SH	21	Lloyd Williams	(substituted in) 76'
FH	22	Rhys Priestland	(substituted in) 70'
FB	23	Gareth Anscombe	(substituted in) 73'
Coach:
(New Zealand) Warren Gatland

FB	15	Maxime Médard	(substituted off) 70'
RW	14	Virimi Vakatawa
OC	13	Maxime Mermoz	(substituted off) 66'
IC	12	Jonathan Danty
LW	11	Djibril Camara
FH	10	Jules Plisson	(substituted off) 62'
SH	9	Maxime Machenaud
N8	8	Damien Chouly	(substituted off) 62'
OF	7	Antoine Burban	(substituted off) 29'	(substituted in) 33'	(substituted off) 52'
BF	6	Wenceslas Lauret
RL	5	Alexandre Flanquart
LL	4	Paul Jedrasiak	(substituted off) 43'
TP	3	Rabah Slimani	(substituted off) 62'
HK	2	Guilhem Guirado (c)
LP	1	Jefferson Poirot	(substituted off) 62'
Replacements:
HK	16	Camille Chat	(substituted in) 62'
PR	17	Uini Atonio	(substituted in) 62'
PR	18	Vincent Pelo	(substituted in) 62'
LK	19	Yoann Maestri	(substituted in) 43'
N8	20	Loann Goujon	(substituted in) 29'	(substituted off) 33'	(substituted in) 52'
SH	21	Sébastien Bézy	(substituted in) 70'
FH	22	François Trinh-Duc	(substituted in) 62'
CE	23	Gaël Fickou	(substituted in) 66'
Coach:
(France) Guy Novès

Man of the Match:
Gareth Davies (Wales)

Touch judges:
JP Doyle (England)
Luke Pearce (England)
Television match official:
Shaun Veldsman (South Africa)

Notes:

- Djibril Camara and Vincent Pelo (France) made their international debuts.

27 February 2016
15:25 CET (UTC+1)

Italy	20–36	Scotland
Try: Ghiraldini 29' c Fuser 62' c Con: Haimona (2/2) 30', 63'; Pen: Haimona (2/2) 9', 49'	Report	Try: Barclay 9' c Hardie 16' c Seymour 77'; Con: Laidlaw (3/3) 10', 17', 78'; Pen: Laidlaw (5/6) 25', 45', 53', 58', 65'

Stadio Olimpico, Rome
Attendance: 67,721
Referee: Jaco Peyper (South Africa)

FB	15	David Odiete
RW	14	Leonardo Sarto
OC	13	Michele Campagnaro
IC	12	Gonzalo Garcia	(substituted off) 75'
LW	11	Mattia Bellini
FH	10	Kelly Haimona	(substituted off) 72'
SH	9	Edoardo Gori	(substituted off) 79'
N8	8	Sergio Parisse (c)
OF	7	Alessandro Zanni
BF	6	Francesco Minto	(substituted off) 67'
RL	5	Joshua Furno	(substituted off) 36'
LL	4	Marco Fuser
TP	3	Lorenzo Cittadini	(substituted off) 57'
HK	2	Leonardo Ghiraldini	(substituted off) 57'
LP	1	Andrea Lovotti	(substituted off) 57'
Replacements:
HK	16	Davide Giazzon	(substituted in) 57'
PR	17	Matteo Zanusso	(substituted in) 57'
PR	18	Martin Castrogiovanni	(substituted in) 57'
LK	19	Valerio Bernabò	(substituted in) 36'
N8	20	Dries van Schalkwyk	(substituted in) 67'
SH	21	Guglielmo Palazzani	(substituted in) 79'
FH	22	Edoardo Padovani	(substituted in) 72'
CE	23	Andrea Pratichetti	(substituted in) 75'
Coach:
(France) Jacques Brunel

FB	15	Stuart Hogg
RW	14	Tommy Seymour
OC	13	Mark Bennett		(substituted off) 62'
IC	12	Duncan Taylor
LW	11	Tim Visser		(substituted off) 72'
FH	10	Finn Russell	(yellow card) 61'
SH	9	Greig Laidlaw (c)
N8	8	Ryan Wilson		(substituted off) 67'
OF	7	John Hardie
BF	6	John Barclay		(substituted off) 79'
RL	5	Jonny Gray
LL	4	Richie Gray		(substituted off) 79'
TP	3	WP Nel	(yellow card) 75'
HK	2	Ross Ford		(substituted off) 63'
LP	1	Alasdair Dickinson
Replacements:
HK	16	Stuart McInally		(substituted in) 63'
PR	17	Rory Sutherland
PR	18	Moray Low		(substituted in) 79'
LK	19	Tim Swinson		(substituted in) 79'
FL	20	Josh Strauss		(substituted in) 67'
SH	21	Sam Hidalgo-Clyne
CE	22	Peter Horne		(substituted in) 62'
WG	23	Sean Lamont		(substituted in) 72'
Coach:
(New Zealand) Vern Cotter

Man of the Match:
Greig Laidlaw (Scotland)

Touch judges:
Pascal Gaüzère (France)
Nick Briant (New Zealand)
Television match official:
Graham Hughes (England)

Notes:

- Edoardo Gori (Italy) earned his 50th test cap.
- The 36 points scored by Scotland was the most they have scored in any Six Nations game.

27 February 2016
16:50 GMT (UTC+0)

England	21–10	Ireland
Try: Watson 57' m Brown 62' c Con: Farrell (1/2) 63'; Pen: Farrell (3/4) 11', 34', 50'	Report	Try: Murray 45' c Con: Sexton (1/1) 46'; Pen: Sexton (1/1) 5'

Twickenham Stadium, London
Attendance: 81,826
Referee: Romain Poite (France)

FB	15	Mike Brown
RW	14	Anthony Watson
OC	13	Jonathan Joseph
IC	12	Owen Farrell		(substituted off) 65'
LW	11	Jack Nowell
FH	10	George Ford
SH	9	Ben Youngs		(substituted off) 59'
N8	8	Billy Vunipola
OF	7	James Haskell	(yellow card) 44'	(substituted off) 76'
BF	6	Chris Robshaw		(substituted off) 70'
RL	5	George Kruis
LL	4	Maro Itoje
TP	3	Dan Cole
HK	2	Dylan Hartley (c)		(substituted off) 70'
LP	1	Joe Marler		(substituted off) 59'
Replacements:
HK	16	Jamie George		(substituted in) 70'
PR	17	Mako Vunipola		(substituted in) 59'
PR	18	Paul Hill
LK	19	Courtney Lawes		(substituted in) 76'
FL	20	Jack Clifford		(substituted in) 70'
SH	21	Danny Care	(yellow card) 70'	(substituted in) 59'
CE	22	Elliot Daly		(substituted in) 65'
FB	23	Alex Goode
Coach:
(Australia) Eddie Jones

FB	15	Rob Kearney
RW	14	Andrew Trimble
OC	13	Robbie Henshaw
IC	12	Stuart McCloskey	(substituted off) 63'
LW	11	Keith Earls
FH	10	Johnny Sexton	(substituted off) 76'
SH	9	Conor Murray	(substituted off) 70'
N8	8	Jamie Heaslip
OF	7	Josh van der Flier
BF	6	CJ Stander	(substituted off) 66'
RL	5	Devin Toner
LL	4	Donnacha Ryan	(substituted off) 65'
TP	3	Mike Ross	(substituted off) 59'
HK	2	Rory Best (c)	(substituted off) 70'
LP	1	Jack McGrath	(substituted off) 59'
Replacements:
HK	16	Richardt Strauss	(substituted in) 70'
PR	17	Cian Healy	(substituted in) 59'
PR	18	Nathan White	(substituted in) 59'
LK	19	Ultan Dillane	(substituted in) 65'
FL	20	Rhys Ruddock	(substituted in) 66'
SH	21	Eoin Reddan	(substituted in) 70'
FH	22	Ian Madigan	(substituted in) 76'
WG	23	Simon Zebo	(substituted in) 63'
Coach:
(New Zealand) Joe Schmidt

Man of the Match:
Billy Vunipola (England)

Touch judges:
Nigel Owens (Wales)
Alexandre Ruiz (France)
Television match official:
Shaun Veldsman (South Africa)

Notes:

- Ultan Dillane, Stuart McCloskey and Josh van der Flier (all Ireland), Elliot Daly (England) made their international debuts.
- England regained the Millennium Trophy, having lost it in 2015.

=== Round 4 ===
12 March 2016
13:30 GMT (UTC+0)

Ireland	58–15	Italy
Try: Trimble 6' m McGrath 14' c Stander 29' m Heaslip (2) 39' m, 48' c Payne 42' c Cronin 53' c Madigan 63' m McFadden 78' c Con: Sexton (3/6) 14', 43', 49'; Madigan (2/3) 54', 79'; Pen: Sexton (1/1) 26'	Report	Try: Odiete 57'; Sarto 74' m Con: Haimona (1/2) 58'; Pen: Padovani (1/1) 23'

Aviva Stadium, Dublin
Attendance: 51,700
Referee: Angus Gardner (Australia)

FB	15	Simon Zebo
RW	14	Andrew Trimble	20' to 28'
OC	13	Jared Payne					(substituted off) 71'
IC	12	Robbie Henshaw			(substituted off) 36'	(substituted in) 40'
LW	11	Keith Earls
FH	10	Johnny Sexton	(substituted off) 49'
SH	9	Conor Murray	(substituted off) 59'
N8	8	Jamie Heaslip
OF	7	Josh van der Flier
BF	6	CJ Stander	(substituted off) 61'
RL	5	Devin Toner	(substituted off) 54'
LL	4	Donnacha Ryan
TP	3	Mike Ross	(substituted off) 54'
HK	2	Rory Best (c)	(substituted off) 49'
LP	1	Jack McGrath	(substituted off) 65'
Replacements:
HK	16	Seán Cronin	(substituted in) 49'
PR	17	Finlay Bealham	(substituted in) 65'
PR	18	Nathan White	(substituted in) 54'
LK	19	Ultan Dillane	(substituted in) 54'
FL	20	Rhys Ruddock	(substituted in) 61'
SH	21	Kieran Marmion	(substituted in) 59'
FH	22	Ian Madigan	(substituted in) 49'
WG	23	Fergus McFadden	(substituted in) 20'	(substituted off) 28'	(substituted in) 36'	(substituted off) 40'	(substituted in) 71'
Coach:
(New Zealand) Joe Schmidt

FB	15	David Odiete
RW	14	Leonardo Sarto
OC	13	Michele Campagnaro
IC	12	Gonzalo Garcia	(substituted off) 54'
LW	11	Mattia Bellini
FH	10	Edoardo Padovani	(substituted off) 59'
SH	9	Guglielmo Palazzani	(substituted off) 61'
N8	8	Sergio Parisse (c)
OF	7	Alessandro Zanni
BF	6	Francesco Minto
RL	5	Marco Fuser	(substituted off) 26'
LL	4	George Biagi	(substituted off) 35'
TP	3	Dario Chistolini	(substituted off) 54'
HK	2	Davide Giazzon	(substituted off) 54'
LP	1	Andrea Lovotti	(substituted off) 71'
Replacements:
HK	16	Oliviero Fabiani	(substituted in) 54'
PR	17	Matteo Zanusso	(substituted in) 71'
PR	18	Pietro Ceccarelli	(substituted in) 54'
LK	19	Quintin Geldenhuys	(substituted in) 26'
FL	20	Braam Steyn	(substituted in) 35'
SH	21	Alberto Lucchese	(substituted in) 61'
CE	22	Kelly Haimona	(substituted in) 54'
FB	23	Luke McLean	(substituted in) 59'
Coach:
(France) Jacques Brunel

Man of the Match:
Donnacha Ryan (Ireland)

Touch judges:
Romain Poite (France)
Marius van der Westhuizen (South Africa)
Television match official:
George Ayoub (Australia)

Notes:

- Finlay Bealham (Ireland), Oliviero Fabiani, Pietro Ceccarelli and Alberto Lucchese (all Italy) made their international debuts.
- Seán Cronin (Ireland) earned his 50th test cap.
- Sergio Parisse equalled Martin Castrogiovanni's record as Italy's most capped player.
- The nine tries scored by Ireland is the most tries they have scored in a Six Nations match.

12 March 2016
16:00 GMT (UTC+0)

England	25–21	Wales
Try: Watson 31' c Con: Farrell (1/1) 32'; Pen: Farrell (6/6) 9', 18', 20', 45', 65', 67'	Report	Try: Biggar 53' c North 73' c Faletau 76' c Con: Biggar (1/1) 54'; Priestland (2/2) 74', 77'

Twickenham Stadium, London
Attendance: 81,916
Referee: Craig Joubert (South Africa)

FB	15	Mike Brown
RW	14	Anthony Watson
OC	13	Jonathan Joseph		(substituted off) 74'
IC	12	Owen Farrell
LW	11	Jack Nowell
FH	10	George Ford		(substituted off) 63'
SH	9	Ben Youngs		(substituted off) 63'
N8	8	Billy Vunipola
OF	7	James Haskell		(substituted off) 67'
BF	6	Chris Robshaw		(substituted off) 71'
RL	5	George Kruis		(substituted off) 78'
LL	4	Maro Itoje
TP	3	Dan Cole	(yellow card) 71'
HK	2	Dylan Hartley (c)		(substituted off) 71'
LP	1	Joe Marler		(substituted off) 56'
Replacements:
HK	16	Luke Cowan-Dickie		(substituted in) 71'
PR	17	Mako Vunipola		(substituted in) 56'
PR	18	Kieran Brookes		(substituted in) 71'
LK	19	Joe Launchbury		(substituted in) 78'
FL	20	Jack Clifford		(substituted in) 67'
SH	21	Danny Care		(substituted in) 63'
CE	22	Manu Tuilagi		(substituted in) 63'
CE	23	Elliot Daly		(substituted in) 74'
Coach:
(Australia) Eddie Jones

FB	15	Liam Williams
RW	14	Alex Cuthbert
OC	13	Jonathan Davies
IC	12	Jamie Roberts
LW	11	George North
FH	10	Dan Biggar	(substituted off) 73'
SH	9	Gareth Davies	(substituted off) 63'
N8	8	Taulupe Faletau
OF	7	Sam Warburton (c)	(substituted off) 56'
BF	6	Dan Lydiate
RL	5	Alun Wyn Jones	(substituted off) 63'
LL	4	Bradley Davies
TP	3	Samson Lee	(substituted off) 53'
HK	2	Scott Baldwin	(substituted off) 53'
LP	1	Rob Evans	(substituted off) 53'
Replacements:
HK	16	Ken Owens	(substituted in) 53'
PR	17	Paul James	(substituted in) 53'
PR	18	Tomas Francis	(substituted in) 53'
LK	19	Luke Charteris	(substituted in) 63'
FL	20	Justin Tipuric	(substituted in) 56'
SH	21	Rhys Webb	(substituted in) 63'
FH	22	Rhys Priestland	(substituted in) 73'
FB	23	Gareth Anscombe
Coach:
(New Zealand) Warren Gatland

Man of the Match:
Maro Itoje (England)

Touch judges:
Jérôme Garcès (France)
Mathieu Raynal (France)
Television match official:
Ben Skeen (New Zealand)

Notes:

- England secured their 25th Triple Crown trophy; the previous one was in 2014.

13 March 2016
15:00 GMT (UTC+0)

Scotland	29–18	France
Try: Hogg 32' m Taylor 35' c Visser 65' m Con: Laidlaw (1/3) 37'; Pen: Laidlaw (3/3) 15', 21', 74'; Hogg (1/1) 46'	Report	Try: Guirado 4' m Fickou 40' c Con: Machenaud (1/1) 40'; Pen: Machenaud (2/2) 51', 57'

Murrayfield Stadium, Edinburgh
Attendance: 67,500
Referee: Glen Jackson (New Zealand)

FB	15	Stuart Hogg
RW	14	Tommy Seymour
OC	13	Duncan Taylor
IC	12	Alex Dunbar
LW	11	Tim Visser
FH	10	Finn Russell	(substituted off) 5'
SH	9	Greig Laidlaw (c)
N8	8	Josh Strauss	(substituted off) 61'
OF	7	John Hardie
BF	6	John Barclay
RL	5	Jonny Gray
LL	4	Richie Gray	(substituted off) 77'
TP	3	WP Nel	(substituted off) 72'
HK	2	Ross Ford	(substituted off) 67'
LP	1	Alasdair Dickinson
Replacements:
HK	16	Stuart McInally	(substituted in) 67'
PR	17	Rory Sutherland
PR	18	Moray Low	(substituted in) 72'
LK	19	Tim Swinson	(substituted in) 77'
N8	20	Ryan Wilson	(substituted in) 61'
SH	21	Sam Hidalgo-Clyne
CE	22	Peter Horne	(substituted in) 5'
WG	23	Sean Lamont
Coach:
(New Zealand) Vern Cotter

FB	15	Scott Spedding
RW	14	Wesley Fofana
OC	13	Gaël Fickou
IC	12	Maxime Mermoz	(substituted off) 68'
LW	11	Virimi Vakatawa
FH	10	François Trinh-Duc	(substituted off) 68'
SH	9	Maxime Machenaud	(substituted off) 74'
N8	8	Damien Chouly
OF	7	Yacouba Camara	(substituted off) 64'
BF	6	Wenceslas Lauret
RL	5	Yoann Maestri
LL	4	Alexandre Flanquart	(substituted off) 51'
TP	3	Rabah Slimani	(substituted off) 61'
HK	2	Guilhem Guirado (c)	(substituted off) 69'
LP	1	Jefferson Poirot	(substituted off) 61'	(substituted in) 64'
Replacements:
HK	16	Camille Chat	(substituted in) 69'
PR	17	Uini Atonio	(substituted in) 61'
PR	18	Vincent Pelo	(substituted in) 61'	(substituted off) 64'
LK	19	Sébastien Vahaamahina	(substituted in) 51'
N8	20	Loann Goujon	(substituted in) 64'
SH	21	Sébastien Bézy	(substituted in) 74'
FH	22	Jules Plisson	(substituted in) 68'
WG	23	Maxime Médard	(substituted in) 68'
Coach:
(France) Guy Novès

Man of the Match:
Stuart Hogg (Scotland)

Touch judges:
Wayne Barnes (England)
Marius Mitrea (Italy)
Television match official:
Ben Skeen (New Zealand)

Notes:

- Greig Laidlaw (Scotland) earned his 50th test cap, and equalled David Sole's record of 25 matches as Scottish captain.
- Scotland beat France for the first time since their 20–16 victory at Murrayfield during the 2006 Six Nations Championship.
- This was also Scotland's first win at Murrayfield in the Six Nations since they beat Ireland in round three of the 2013 Championship, breaking a 7-game losing streak at home.
- France's loss guaranteed that England won the championship. This was the first time that a nation has been sure of winning the championship title before their final match during the competition's current six-team format.
- Scotland's win also guaranteed Italy would win the "wooden spoon" for coming last. This was also the first time that a nation has been confirmed as coming bottom of the Championship table before their final match in the competition's current six-team format.

=== Round 5 ===
19 March 2016
14:30 GMT (UTC+0)

Wales	67–14	Italy
Try: Webb 4' c Biggar 28' c J. Davies 32' c Roberts 44' m North 48' c Williams 56' c Moriarty (2) 64' c, 78' c G. Davies 80+2' c Con: Biggar (5/6) 4', 29', 32', 49', 58'; Priestland (3/3) 65', 79', 80+2'; Pen: Biggar (2/2) 14', 20'	Report	Try: Palazzani 53' c Garcia 61' c Con: Haimona (2/2) 54', 62'

Millennium Stadium, Cardiff
Attendance: 74,160
Referee: Romain Poite (France)

FB	15	Liam Williams
RW	14	George North
OC	13	Jonathan Davies
IC	12	Jamie Roberts
LW	11	Hallam Amos	(substituted off) 48'
FH	10	Dan Biggar	(substituted off) 58'
SH	9	Rhys Webb	(substituted off) 63'
N8	8	Taulupe Faletau
OF	7	Justin Tipuric	(substituted off) 16'
BF	6	Dan Lydiate (c)
RL	5	Luke Charteris
LL	4	Bradley Davies	(substituted off) 58'
TP	3	Samson Lee	(substituted off) 58'
HK	2	Scott Baldwin	(substituted off) 49'
LP	1	Rob Evans	(substituted off) 49'
Replacements:
HK	16	Ken Owens	(substituted in) 49'
PR	17	Gethin Jenkins	(substituted in) 49'
PR	18	Aaron Jarvis	(substituted in) 58'
LK	19	Jake Ball	(substituted in) 58'
FL	20	Ross Moriarty	(substituted in) 16'
SH	21	Gareth Davies	(substituted in) 63'
FH	22	Rhys Priestland	(substituted in) 58'
FB	23	Gareth Anscombe	(substituted in) 48'
Coach:
(New Zealand) Warren Gatland

FB	15	David Odiete
RW	14	Leonardo Sarto
OC	13	Andrea Pratichetti		(substituted off) 35'
IC	12	Gonzalo Garcia
LW	11	Mattia Bellini		(substituted off) 33'
FH	10	Tommaso Allan
SH	9	Guglielmo Palazzani	(yellow card) 18'	(substituted off) 64'
N8	8	Sergio Parisse (c)
OF	7	Alessandro Zanni
BF	6	Francesco Minto		(substituted off) 58'
RL	5	Valerio Bernabò		(substituted off) 46'
LL	4	Quintin Geldenhuys
TP	3	Martin Castrogiovanni		(substituted off) 46'
HK	2	Davide Giazzon		(substituted off) 49'
LP	1	Andrea Lovotti		(substituted off) 64'
Replacements:
HK	16	Oliviero Fabiani		(substituted in) 49'
PR	17	Matteo Zanusso		(substituted in) 64'
PR	18	Dario Chistolini		(substituted in) 46'
FL	19	Jacopo Sarto		(substituted in) 46'
FL	20	Braam Steyn		(substituted in) 58'
SH	21	Alberto Lucchese		(substituted in) 64'
CE	22	Kelly Haimona		(substituted in) 35'
FB	23	Luke McLean		(substituted in) 33'
Coach:
(France) Jacques Brunel

Man of the Match:
George North (Wales)

Touch judges:
Wayne Barnes (England)
Marius van der Westhuizen (South Africa)
Television match official:
Graham Hughes (England)

Notes:

- Jacopo Sarto (Italy) made his international debut.
- Wales' 53-point margin of victory was their biggest winning margin over Italy, surpassing the previous record of 41 set during the previous 2015 tournament.
- This was Wales' biggest winning margin in a Six Nations match, surpassing the 48-point winning margin set against Scotland in 2014.

19 March 2016
17:00 GMT (UTC+0)

Ireland	35–25	Scotland
Try: Stander 27' c Earls 30' m Murray 47' c Toner 68' c Con: Sexton (3/4) 28', 49', 68'; Pen: Sexton (3/4) 5', 12', 17'	Report	Try: Hogg 19' c Gray 55' c Dunbar 77' m Con: Laidlaw (2/3) 20', 55'; Pen: Laidlaw (2/2) 14', 40'

Aviva Stadium, Dublin
Attendance: 51,700
Referee: Pascal Gaüzère (France)

FB	15	Simon Zebo
RW	14	Andrew Trimble		(substituted off) 78'
OC	13	Jared Payne
IC	12	Robbie Henshaw
LW	11	Keith Earls
FH	10	Johnny Sexton	(yellow card) 76'
SH	9	Conor Murray		(substituted off) 78'
N8	8	Jamie Heaslip
OF	7	Tommy O'Donnell		(substituted off) 68'
BF	6	CJ Stander
RL	5	Devin Toner
LL	4	Donnacha Ryan		(substituted off) 68'
TP	3	Mike Ross		(substituted off) 62'
HK	2	Rory Best (c)		(substituted off) 67'
LP	1	Jack McGrath		(substituted off) 67'
Replacements:
HK	16	Richardt Strauss		(substituted in) 67'
PR	17	Cian Healy		(substituted in) 67'
PR	18	Nathan White		(substituted in) 62'
LK	19	Ultan Dillane		(substituted in) 68'
FL	20	Rhys Ruddock		(substituted in) 68'
SH	21	Eoin Reddan		(substituted in) 78'
FH	22	Ian Madigan
WG	23	Fergus McFadden		(substituted in) 78'
Coach:
(New Zealand) Joe Schmidt

FB	15	Stuart Hogg
RW	14	Tommy Seymour
OC	13	Duncan Taylor
IC	12	Alex Dunbar	(yellow card) 67'
LW	11	Tim Visser		(substituted off) 68'
FH	10	Duncan Weir		(substituted off) 62'
SH	9	Greig Laidlaw (c)
N8	8	Ryan Wilson
OF	7	John Hardie		(substituted off) 52'
BF	6	John Barclay	(yellow card) 24'
RL	5	Tim Swinson		(substituted off) 62'
LL	4	Richie Gray
TP	3	WP Nel		(substituted off) 67'
HK	2	Ross Ford		(substituted off) 50'
LP	1	Alasdair Dickinson		(substituted off) 66'
Replacements:
HK	16	Stuart McInally		(substituted in) 50'
PR	17	Rory Sutherland		(substituted in) 66'
PR	18	Moray Low		(substituted in) 67'
LK	19	Rob Harley		(substituted in) 62'
FL	20	Josh Strauss		(substituted in) 52'
SH	21	Henry Pyrgos
CE	22	Peter Horne		(substituted in) 62'
WG	23	Sean Lamont		(substituted in) 68'
Coach:
(New Zealand) Vern Cotter

Man of the Match:
Jamie Heaslip (Ireland)

Touch judges:
Craig Joubert (South Africa)
Alexandre Ruiz (France)
Television match official:
Shaun Veldsman (South Africa)

Notes:

- Ireland retained the Centenary Quaich for the third consecutive year.
- Rory Sutherland (Scotland) made his international debut.
- Keith Earls (Ireland) and John Barclay (Scotland) earned their 50th test caps.
- Ross Ford (Scotland) made his 100th international appearance; 99 for Scotland, 1 for the British and Irish Lions.

19 March 2016
21:00 CET (UTC+1)

France	21–31	England
Pen: Machenaud (7/7) 2', 15', 28', 39', 43', 50', 58'	Report	Try: Care 11' c Cole 19' c Watson 55' m Con: Farrell (2/3) 12', 20'; Pen: Farrell (4/5) 4', 44', 71', 77'

Stade de France, Paris
Attendance: 78,750
Referee: Nigel Owens (Wales)

FB	15	Scott Spedding
RW	14	Wesley Fofana
OC	13	Gaël Fickou
IC	12	Maxime Mermoz		(substituted off) 69'
LW	11	Virimi Vakatawa
FH	10	François Trinh-Duc		(substituted off) 13'
SH	9	Maxime Machenaud		(substituted off) 75'
N8	8	Loann Goujon		(substituted off) 69'
OF	7	Bernard Le Roux			(substituted off) 79'
BF	6	Damien Chouly
RL	5	Yoann Maestri
LL	4	Alexandre Flanquart		(substituted off) 57'
TP	3	Rabah Slimani		(substituted off) 57'
HK	2	Guilhem Guirado (c)		(substituted off) 66'
LP	1	Jefferson Poirot		(substituted off) 57'	(substituted in) 79'
Replacements:
HK	16	Camille Chat		(substituted in) 66'
PR	17	Uini Atonio		(substituted in) 57'
PR	18	Xavier Chiocci	(yellow card) 76'	(substituted in) 57'
LK	19	Paul Jedrasiak		(substituted in) 57'
FL	20	Wenceslas Lauret		(substituted in) 69'
SH	21	Sébastien Bezy		(substituted in) 75'
FH	22	Jules Plisson		(substituted in) 13'
WG	23	Maxime Médard		(substituted in) 69'
Coach:
(France) Guy Novès

FB	15	Mike Brown
RW	14	Anthony Watson
OC	13	Jonathan Joseph
IC	12	Owen Farrell
LW	11	Jack Nowell
FH	10	George Ford
SH	9	Danny Care	(substituted off) 43'
N8	8	Billy Vunipola
OF	7	James Haskell
BF	6	Chris Robshaw	(substituted off) 75'
RL	5	George Kruis
LL	4	Maro Itoje
TP	3	Dan Cole
HK	2	Dylan Hartley (c)	(substituted off) 67'
LP	1	Mako Vunipola	(substituted off) 40'
Replacements:
HK	16	Luke Cowan-Dickie	(substituted in) 67'
PR	17	Joe Marler	(substituted in) 40'
PR	18	Kieran Brookes
LK	19	Joe Launchbury
FL	20	Jack Clifford	(substituted in) 75'
SH	21	Ben Youngs	(substituted in) 43'
CE	22	Manu Tuilagi
CE	23	Elliot Daly
Coach:
(Australia) Eddie Jones

Man of the Match:
Billy Vunipola (England)

Touch judges:
John Lacey (Ireland)
Leighton Hodges (Wales)
Television match official:
Ben Skeen (New Zealand)

Notes:

- England secured their first Grand Slam since the 2003 Six Nations Championship
- Owen Farrell became England's second-highest points scorer in history, behind only Jonny Wilkinson and overtaking Paul Grayson.

== Statistics ==
=== Points scorers ===
Pos	Name	Team	Pts
1	Owen Farrell	England	69
2	Greig Laidlaw	Scotland	62
3	Dan Biggar	Wales	54
4	Johnny Sexton	Ireland	49
5	Maxime Machenaud	France	29
6	Carlo Canna	Italy	22
7	Rhys Priestland	Wales	21
8	George North	Wales	20
9	Kelly Haimona	Italy	19
10	Jules Plisson	France	16

=== Try scorers ===
Pos	Name	Team	Tries
1	George North	Wales	4
2	Jonathan Joseph	England	3
2	Conor Murray	Ireland	3
2	Anthony Watson	England	3
5	Dan Biggar	Wales	2
5	Gareth Davies	Wales	2
5	Taulupe Faletau	Wales	2
5	Guilhem Guirado	France	2
5	Jamie Heaslip	Ireland	2
5	Stuart Hogg	Scotland	2
5	Ross Moriarty	Wales	2
5	Jamie Roberts	Wales	2
5	Tommy Seymour	Scotland	2
5	CJ Stander	Ireland	2
5	Duncan Taylor	Scotland	2

== Broadcasting ==
In the United Kingdom, 2016 marked the first year that the tournament was broadcast across both the BBC and ITV, with the BBC broadcasting France, Scotland and Wales home matches and ITV screening England, Ireland and Italy home fixtures. In this first year of the split UK TV deal, the BBC covered eight matches from the tournament, and ITV the other seven. This arrangement will alternate every year for the remainder of the deal to 2021. S4C in Wales will also broadcast every Wales game in Welsh for the remainder of this contract.

In France, all of the matches were broadcast on France 2, the traditional French channel for rugby. In the Republic of Ireland, matches are being broadcast by RTÉ. In Italy, all of the matches are being broadcast live on DMAX.
