= Jacques Brunel (rugby union) =

French rugby union player & coach

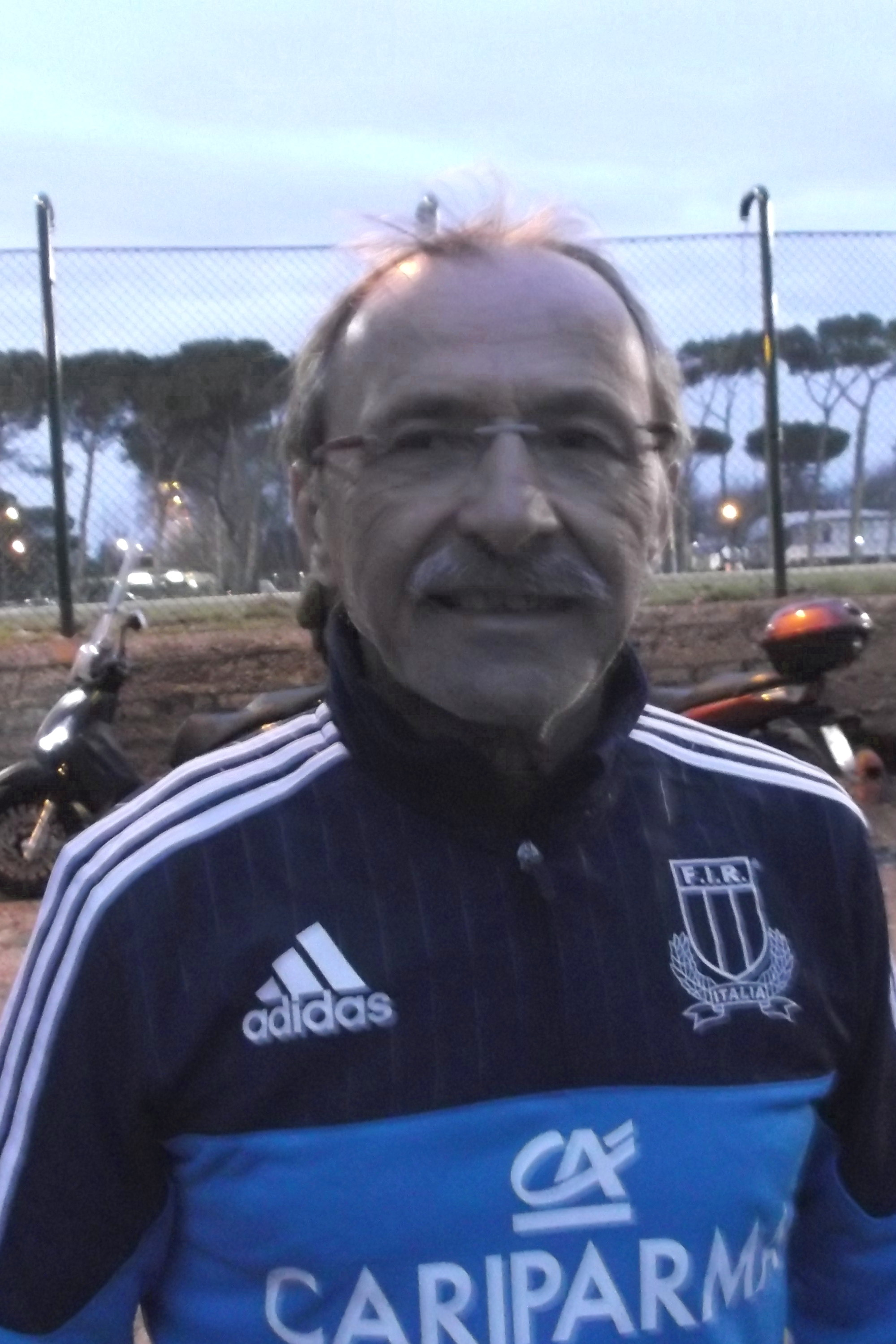
- Brunel with Italy in 2016
- Born: 14 January 1954 (age 72) Courrensan, France

Rugby union career
- Position: Fullback
Amateur team(s)
Years	Team	Apps	(Points)
1972–1979	Auch		
1979–1980	Grenoble		
1980–1981	Carcassonne		
1981–1988	Auch		
Coaching career
- Years: Team
- 1988–1995: Auch
- 1995–1999: Colomiers
- 1999–2001: Pau
- 2001–2007: France (Asst.)
- 2007–2011: Perpignan
- 2011–2016: Italy
- 2016–2017: Bordeaux Bègles
- 2017–2019: France
- Correct as of 28 August 2015

Jacques Brunel (born 14 January 1954) is a French rugby union coach and former player. He was most recently the French national team head coach, having previously been assistant coach for his nation and had led the Italian national team between 2011 and 2016. Brunel, who has spent most of his career in France, formally coached his former team Auch, as well as Bordeaux Bègles, Colomiers, Pau and Perpignan.

== Early life and playing career ==
Jacques Brunel, born in Courrensan, played club rugby for his local side at age grade level, and joined the academy side at Auch in 1967 at the age of 13. Haven moved through the age grade ranks, he graduated to the club's senior side in 1972 at the age of 18. He represented the club up until 1979, playing in the French Rugby Union Championship, where for most of the time, the club failed to progress past the Pool stages. During the 1979–80 French Rugby Union Championship, Brunel played for Grenoble, where they made it to the Last 32 stage, but was beaten by Montferrand 10–3. In 1980, again Brunel only made it as far as the Last 32, with Carcassonne, being beaten by Béziers 29–6. In 1981, he returned to Auch, where he remained with the club until his retirement at the end of 1987–88 season.

== Coaching career ==
=== The beginning ===
He started coaching immediately after he retired from playing rugby in 1988, where he became the head coach of Auch until 1995. During his time as coach at the club, he led the team to 4 Top 16 rounds, 3 of which came in consecutive years. In 1995, he arrived at Colomiers, where in just his second season in charge, he led the team to the Quarter-finals of the 1996–97 French Rugby Union Championship. During the 1997–98 season, he led the team to the Semi-final of the French Rugby Union Championship, but narrowly lost to Perpignan 15–12. However, he did oversee Colomiers first ever silverware, when they won the 1997–98 European Challenge Cup. In 1999, Brunel took the team one step forwards, leading them to the 1999 Heineken Cup Final, only to lose to Ulster 21–6.

In 1999, he moved to Pau, where during the 1999–2000 French Rugby Union Championship, they made it to the semi-final, where they lost to Brunel former club Colomiers 24–22. Pau did however, make it to the 1999–2000 European Challenge Cup final, where they beat Castres Olympique 34–21. However, in Brunel stood down from his post after his second season, following Pau's poor form, and close call with relegation. In 2001, Jacques Brunel joined the technical staff of the French national team under the guidance of Bernard Laporte, training the forwards. Under his guidance, France became known for their strong forwards work, which was a key element in their Six Nations Championship grand slam winning campaigns in 2002 and 2004. It was also a key part in France coming fourth in the 2003 Rugby World Cup, and saw them through to the Semi-finals of the 2007 Rugby World Cup, which saw France beat New Zealand, 20–18, in the Quarter-finals. However, France were dominated by a strong England pack during the Semi-finals, which saw the home side lose 14–9, before being dominated again by Argentina in the Bronze final, to lose 34–10. France's form during that world cup, saw all coached lose their job with the National team.

=== Perpignan (2007–2011) ===
After the world cup, he joined Perpignan as the head coach. In his debut season, he guided the team to fourth on the table, however they lost to Clermont 21–7 in the Semi-final. Though, during the 2008–09 Top 14 season, he led the team to victory, topping the table with 92 points, 20 wins from 26 matches, and a Semi-final win over Stade Français 25–21. They then beat Clermont 22–13. Perpignan topped the table again in the 2009–10 Top 14 season, and then went on to beat Toulouse 21–13 in the Semi-final to set up a repeat of the 2009 final. However, on this occasion, Clermont won 19–6. In 2011 he left his post with Perpignan to join the Italian national team as head coach.

=== Italy (2011–2016) ===
Jacques Brunel's first match in charge of Italy came during the 2012 Six Nations Championship, which saw Italy face France in Paris. France scored 4 tries to claim a 30–12 victory in Brunel's opening match. That was followed by a narrow 15–19 loss to England in Rome and a 42–10 loss to Ireland. They went into the final week with 4 losses, however a 13–6 win over Scotland saw Italy avoid the wooden spoon. Brunel's starting pack during that Scottish game, was the most internationally experienced ever to play an international match. Brunel gained a further two victories during Italy's 2012 Summer Tour, where they beat Canada 25–16 and the United States 30–10. They did however lose to Argentina in the opening fixture of the tour, losing 37–22. During Italy's 2012 end of year tests, they came within three points of beating Australia, losing 19–22 in Florence.

During the 2013 Six Nations Championship, Italy equaled their best positioning of fourth, with wins over France and Ireland, with the Irish win the first against the team in the Championship. Due to the 2013 British & Irish Lions tour to Australia, Italy joined Scotland, Samoa and South Africa in a quadrangular tournament hosted by the Springboks. Italy lost all three games, to finish last in the tournament. During the 2013 end of year tests, Italy claimed a sole win against Fiji, who was down to just 11 player at one point in the game, where Italy scored 17 points in that time, to earn a full-time score of 37–31.

Italy finished last during the 2014 Six Nations Championship, the first time since Brunel became head coach. They lost all five matches, which was followed by a Summer Tour white-wash in June later that year. They lost in consecutive week-ends to Fiji 25–14, Samoa 15–0 and Japan 26–23 - which was Italy's first ever loss to the Japanese. Their 9-match losing streak came to an end in their opening fixture of the 2014 end of year tests, beating Samoa 24–13.

In 2015, Italy finished fifth during the 2015 Six Nations Championship, with their only win coming against Scotland, winning 22–19. Though, this win was Italy's first win over Scotland in Scotland, since 2007. Italy later went down to Scotland twice during the Rugby World Cup Warm-ups, with the second test being a record defeat, 48–7. During their 2015 Rugby World Cup campaign, Italy only came away with 2 wins to finish third in their pool. They opened with a 32–10 loss to France, before narrowly beating Canada 23–18 a week later. They were massively competitive in their game against Ireland, losing by just 7 points, 16–9. Their final game came against Romania, which was a must win game for both teams if they wanted to qualify for the 2019 Rugby World Cup. Italy scored 4 tries to earn a bonus point, which led them to a 32–22 win.

=== Bordeaux Bègles ===
On 14 March 2016, following the completion of his contract with Italy, Brunel announced he would become the forwards coach for Bordeaux Bègles. However, by the end of the 2015–16 Top 14 season, Brunel had been promoted to head coach of Bordeaux, with Régis Sonnes stepping down as the lead coach.

Brunel's first match in charge was a 15–9 victory over reigning champions Racing 92. Despite the good start to the season, Bordeaux only went on to win 10 games in 25 matches for the rest of the season, placing them in eleventh on the table. While in Europe, they failed to progress out of the pool stage, winning just half of their games.

Until his departure, Bordeaux put in inconsistent performances in the 2017–18 Top 14 season, winning just 7 games in the opening 13 rounds. Though this did include victories over giants Clermont, Montpellier and Toulon. Whilst in the European Challenge Cup, they had only managed to defeat Russian side Enisey-STM heading into the final two rounds. With the announcement of Brunel stepping up to lead the French national team, he coached his last game at Bordeaux on 30 December 2017, losing away to Stade Français 22–12.

=== France ===
On 27 December 2017, Brunel was named as the new coach of the French national team after Guy Novès was sacked due to a series of poor results. Brunel's first match in charge, was a last minute loss to Ireland, losing 15–13, with a drop goal from Johnny Sexton three minutes into over time during the 2018 Six Nations Championship. The following week, in what was the first ever match where the Auld Alliance Trophy was contested, Scotland claimed the victory winning 32–26. Brunel gained his first victory in round 3, defeating Italy at the Stade Vélodrome in Marseille, the first time France had taken a home game away from Paris during the Championship, to retain the Giuseppe Garibaldi Trophy. In round 4, France defeated England for the first time since 2015, running out 22–16 victors, and had it not been because of a defeat to Wales (14–13) in the final round, France could have finished second. However, their narrow loss meant they finished fourth, ahead of England and Italy in fifth and sixth. During the 2018 June rugby union tests, Brunel led France to a series whitewash against New Zealand, losing the first test 52–11, the second 26–13 and the third 49–14.

The 2018/19 International Season for France saw Brunel lead his nation to just three wins in eight matches, defeating Argentina during the 2018 November test window and Scotland and Italy during the 2019 Six Nations Championship; finishing fourth on the table. Despite this, the Championship was not without recorded for the French side, losing to Wales in the opening round after leading 16–0 at half time before going onto recording their biggest defeat to England, losing 44–8.

== Coaching statistics ==
=== Italy ===
==== International matches as head coach ====
Note: World Rankings Column shows the World Ranking Italy was placed at on the following Monday after each of their matches.

Matches (2012–2016)
Matches	Date	Opposition	Venue	Score (Ita.–Opponent)	Competition	Captain	World Ranking
2012
1	4 February	France	Stade de France, Saint-Denis	12–30	Six Nations	Sergio Parisse	12th
2	11 February	England	Stadio Olimpico, Rome	15–19	Six Nations	Sergio Parisse	12th
3	25 February	Ireland	Aviva Stadium, Dublin	10–42	Six Nations	Sergio Parisse	12th
4	10 March	Wales	Millennium Stadium, Cardiff	3–24	Six Nations	Sergio Parisse	12th
5	17 March	Scotland	Stadio Olimpico, Rome	13–6	Six Nations	Sergio Parisse	11th
6	9 June	Argentina	Estadio Bicentenario, San Juan	22–37	Americas tour	Marco Bortolami	12th
7	15 June	Canada	BMO Field, Toronto	25–16	Americas tour	Martin Castrogiovanni	12th
8	15 June	United States	BBVA Compass Stadium, Houston	30–10	Americas tour	Martin Castrogiovanni	11th
9	10 November	Tonga	Stadio Mario Rigamonti, Brescia	28–23	End of year tests	Sergio Parisse	11th
10	17 November	New Zealand	Stadio Olimpico, Rome	10–42	End of year tests	Sergio Parisse	11th
11	24 November	Australia	Stadio Artemio Franchi, Florence	19–22	End of year tests	Sergio Parisse	10th
2013
12	3 February	France	Stadio Olimpico, Rome	23–18	Six Nations	Sergio Parisse	9th
13	9 February	Scotland	Murrayfield Stadium, Edinburgh	10–34	Six Nations	Sergio Parisse	11th
14	23 February	Wales	Stadio Olimpico, Rome	9–26	Six Nations	Martin Castrogiovanni	12th
15	10 March	England	Twickenham Stadium, London	11–18	Six Nations	Sergio Parisse	12th
16	16 March	Ireland	Stadio Olimpico, Rome	22–15	Six Nations	Sergio Parisse	12th
17	8 June	South Africa	Kings Park Stadium, Durban	10–44	SA quadrangular tournament	Sergio Parisse	10th
18	15 June	Samoa	Mbombela Stadium, Nelspruit, South Africa	10–39	SA quadrangular tournament	Sergio Parisse	12th
19	22 June	Scotland	Loftus Versfeld, Pretoria, South Africa	29–30	SA quadrangular tournament	Sergio Parisse	12th
20	9 November	Australia	Stadio Olimpico di Torino, Turin	20–50	End of year tests	Sergio Parisse	11th
21	16 November	Fiji	Stadio Giovanni Zini, Cremona	37–31	End of year tests	Sergio Parisse	11th
22	23 November	Argentina	Stadio Olimpico, Rome	14–19	End of year tests	Sergio Parisse	13th
2014
23	1 February	Wales	Millennium Stadium, Cardiff	15–23	Six Nations	Sergio Parisse	13th
24	9 February	France	Stade de France, Saint-Denis	10–30	Six Nations	Sergio Parisse	13th
25	22 February	Scotland	Stadio Olimpico, Rome	20–21	Six Nations	Sergio Parisse	14th
26	8 March	Ireland	Aviva Stadium, Dublin	7–46	Six Nations	Marco Bortolami	14th
27	15 March	England	Stadio Olimpico, Rome	11–52	Six Nations	Sergio Parisse	14th
28	7 June	Fiji	ANZ National Stadium, Suva	14–25	Summer tour	Quintin Geldenhuys	14th
29	14 June	Samoa	Apia Park, Apia	0–15	Summer tour	Quintin Geldenhuys	14th
30	21 June	Japan	Chichibunomiya Rugby Stadium, Tokyo	23–26	Summer tour	Quintin Geldenhuys	14th
31	8 November	Samoa	Stadio Cino e Lillo Del Duca, Ascoli Piceno	24–13	End of year tests	Sergio Parisse	14th
32	14 November	Argentina	Stadio Luigi Ferraris, Genoa	18–20	End of year tests	Sergio Parisse	14th
33	22 November	South Africa	Stadio Euganeo, Padua	6–22	End of year tests	Sergio Parisse	14th
2015
34	7 February	Ireland	Stadio Olimpico, Rome	3–26	Six Nations	Sergio Parisse	14th
35	14 February	England	Twickenham Stadium, London	17–47	Six Nations	Sergio Parisse	14th
36	28 February	Scotland	Murrayfield Stadium, Edinburgh	22–19	Six Nations	Sergio Parisse	14th
37	15 March	France	Stadio Olimpico, Rome	0–29	Six Nations	Sergio Parisse	14th
38	21 March	Wales	Stadio Olimpico, Rome	20–61	Six Nations	Sergio Parisse	15th (Teams worst)
39	22 August	Scotland	Stadio Olimpico di Torino, Turin	12–16	2015 RWC warm-ups	Quintin Geldenhuys	15th
40	29 August	Scotland	Murrayfield Stadium, Edinburgh	7–48	2015 RWC warm-ups	Leonardo Ghiraldini	15th
41	5 September	Wales	Millennium Stadium, Cardiff	19–23	2015 RWC warm-ups	Sergio Parisse	14th
42	19 September	France	Twickenham Stadium, London, England	10–32	2015 Rugby World Cup	Leonardo Ghiraldini	15th
43	26 September	Canada	Elland Road, Leeds, England	23–18	2015 Rugby World Cup	Leonardo Ghiraldini	14th
44	4 October	Ireland	Olympic Stadium, London, England	9–16	2015 Rugby World Cup	Sergio Parisse	13th
45	11 October	Romania	Sandy Park, Exeter, England	32–22	2015 Rugby World Cup	Quintin Geldenhuys	12th
2016
46	6 February	France	Stade de France, Saint-Denis	21–23	Six Nations	Sergio Parisse	12th
47	14 February	England	Stadio Olimpico, Rome	9–40	Six Nations	Sergio Parisse	12th
48	27 February	Scotland	Stadio Olimpico, Rome	20–36	Six Nations	Sergio Parisse	14th
49	12 March	Ireland	Aviva Stadium, Dublin	15–58	Six Nations	Sergio Parisse	14th
50	19 March	Wales	Principality Stadium, Cardiff	14–67	Six Nations	Sergio Parisse	14th

==== Record by country ====
Opponent	Played	Won	Drew	Lost	Win ratio (%)	For	Against
Argentina	3	0	0	3	0%	54	76
Australia	2	0	0	2	0%	39	72
Canada	2	2	0	0	100%	48	34
England	5	0	0	5	0%	63	176
Fiji	2	1	0	1	50%	51	56
France	6	1	0	5	16.67%	76	162
Ireland	6	1	0	5	16.67%	66	203
Japan	1	0	0	1	0%	23	26
New Zealand	1	0	0	1	0%	10	42
Romania	1	1	0	0	100%	32	22
Samoa	3	1	0	2	33.33%	34	67
Scotland	8	2	0	6	25.00%	133	210
South Africa	2	0	0	2	0%	16	66
Tonga	1	1	0	0	100%	28	23
United States	1	1	0	0	100%	30	10
Wales	6	0	0	6	0%	80	224
TOTAL	50	11	0	39	22.00%	783	1469

==== Honors ====
- Giuseppe Garibaldi Trophy
  - Winners: 2013

=== France ===
==== International matches as head coach ====
Note: World Rankings Column shows the World Ranking France was placed at on the following Monday after each of their matches

Matches (2018–2019)
Matches	Date	Opposition	Venue	Score (Fra.–Opponent)	Competition	Captain	World Ranking
2018
1	3 February	Ireland	Stade de France, Saint-Denis	13–15	Six Nations	Guilhem Guirado	10th
2	11 February	Scotland	Murrayfield Stadium, Edinburgh	26–32	Six Nations	Guilhem Guirado	10th
3	23 February	Italy	Stade Vélodrome, Marseille	34–17	Six Nations	Guilhem Guirado	10th
4	10 March	England	Stade de France, Saint-Denis	22–16	Six Nations	Guilhem Guirado	8th
5	17 March	Wales	Millennium Stadium, Cardiff	13–14	Six Nations	Mathieu Bastareaud	8th
6	9 June	New Zealand	Eden Park, Auckland	11–52	New Zealand test series	Mathieu Bastareaud	8th
7	16 June	New Zealand	Wellington Regional Stadium, Wellington	13–26	New Zealand test series	Mathieu Bastareaud	8th
8	23 June	New Zealand	Forsyth Barr Stadium, Dunedin	14–49	New Zealand test series	Morgan Parra	8th
9	10 November	South Africa	Stade de France, Saint-Denis	26–29	Autumn internationals	Guilhem Guirado	8th
10	17 November	Argentina	Stade Pierre-Mauroy, Villeneuve-d'Ascq	28–13	Autumn internationals	Guilhem Guirado	8th
11	24 November	Fiji	Stade de France, Saint-Denis	14–21	Autumn internationals	Guilhem Guirado	8th
2019
12	1 February	Wales	Stade de France, Saint-Denis	19–24	Six Nations	Guilhem Guirado	10th
13	10 February	England	Twickenham Stadium, London	8–44	Six Nations	Guilhem Guirado	10th
14	23 February	Scotland	Stade de France, Saint-Denis	27–10	Six Nations	Guilhem Guirado	8th
15	9 March	Ireland	Aviva Stadium, Dublin	14–26	Six Nations	Guilhem Guirado	8th
16	16 March	Italy	Stadio Olimpico, Rome	25–14	Six Nations	Guilhem Guirado	8th
17	17 August	Scotland	Allianz Riviera, Nice	32–3	2019 RWC warm-ups	Jefferson Poirot	7th
18	24 August	Scotland	Murrayfield Stadium, Edinburgh	14–17	2019 RWC warm-ups	Guilhem Guirado	8th
19	30 August	Italy	Stade de France, Saint-Denis	47–19	2019 RWC warm-ups	Jefferson Poirot	8th
20	21 September	Argentina	Tokyo Stadium, Chōfu	23–21	2019 Rugby World Cup	Guilhem Guirado	7th
21	2 October	United States	Fukuoka Hakatanomori Stadium, Fukuoka	33–9	2019 Rugby World Cup	Louis Picamoles	7th
22	6 October	Tonga	Kumamoto Stadium, Kumamoto	23–21	2019 Rugby World Cup	Jefferson Poirot	7th
(Note: Match cancelled due to Typhoon Hagibis; result awarded as a nil-nil draw although the match is not included in official records.)	12 October	England	International Stadium Yokohama, Yokohama	C–C	2019 Rugby World Cup	–	8th
23	20 October	Wales	Ōita Stadium, Ōita	19–20	2019 Rugby World Cup	Guilhem Guirado	7th

==== Record by country ====
Opponent	Played	Won	Drew	Lost	Win ratio (%)	For	Against
Argentina	2	2	0	0	100%	51	34
England	2	1	0	1	50%	30	60
Fiji	1	0	0	1	0%	14	21
Ireland	2	0	0	2	0%	27	41
Italy	3	3	0	0	100%	106	50
New Zealand	3	0	0	3	0%	38	127
Scotland	4	2	0	2	50%	99	62
South Africa	1	0	0	1	0%	26	29
Tonga	1	1	0	0	100%	23	21
United States	1	1	0	0	100%	33	9
Wales	3	0	0	3	0%	51	58
TOTAL	23	10	0	13	43.48%	498	512

==== Honors ====
- Giuseppe Garibaldi Trophy
  - Winner: 2018, 2019
- Auld Alliance Trophy
  - Winner: 2019

== Other honours ==
Colomiers

- European Challenge Cup
  - Winner: 1998
- Heineken Cup
  - runner up: 1999

Pau

- European Challenge Cup
  - Winner: 2000

Perpignan

- Top 14
  - Winner: 2009
  - Runner-up: 2010

France (as assistant coach)

- Six Nations Championship
  - Winner: 2002, 2004, 2006, 2007
  - Runner-up: 2005
- Grand Slam
  - Winners: 2002, 2004
- Trophée des Bicentenaires
  - Winner: 2004, Nov 2005
- Giuseppe Garibaldi Trophy
  - Winner: 2007

Sporting positions
Preceded by (South Africa) Nick Mallett	Italy National Rugby Union Coach; 2011–2016	Succeeded by (Ireland) Conor O'Shea
Preceded by (France) Guy Novès	French National Rugby Union Coach; 2017 – 2019	Succeeded by (France) Fabien Galthié
