= Paul Jedrasiak =

French rugby union player (born 1993)

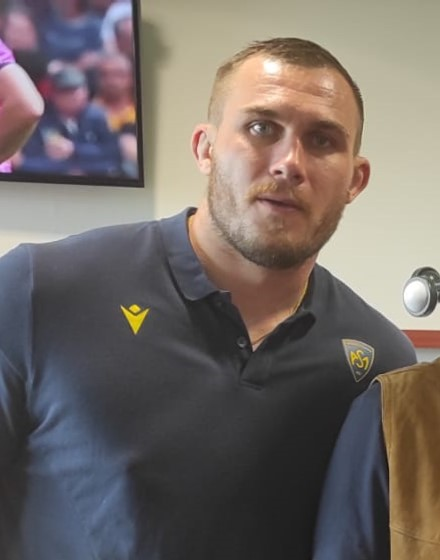
- Born: 6 February 1993 (age 33) Montluçon, France
- Height: 2.00 m (6 ft 6 1/2 in)
- Weight: 120 kg (18 st 13 lb; 260 lb)

Rugby union career
- Position: Lock
Senior career
Years	Team	Apps	(Points)
2013–2024	Clermont	203	(97)
2024–	Castres	7	(0)
- Correct as of 6 February 2025
International career
Years	Team	Apps	(Points)
2016–2017	France	10	(0)

Paul Jedrasiak (born 6 February 1993) is a French rugby union player. His position is Lock and he currently plays for Castres in the Top 14. He was named in the French squad for the 2016 Six Nations Championship, and made his debut on 6 February against Italy.
