= George Kruis =

British Lions & England international rugby union player

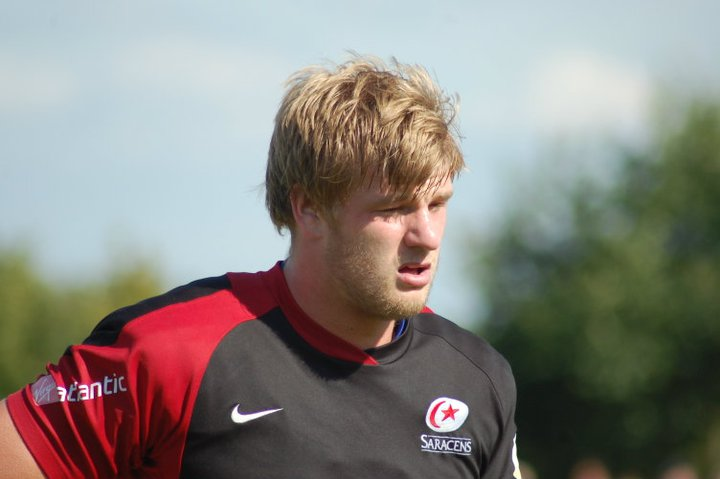
- Kruis in 2011
- Born: George John Kruis; 22 February 1990 (age 36) Guildford, Surrey, England
- Height: 1.98 m (6 ft 6 in)
- Weight: 123 kg (19 st 5 lb; 271 lb)
- School: St John's School, Leatherhead
- University: University of Hertfordshire

Rugby union career
- Position: Lock
Youth career
- Dorking RFC
Amateur team(s)
Years	Team	Apps	(Points)
2009–2010	Barking RFC	9	(15)
Senior career
Years	Team	Apps	(Points)
2009–2020	Saracens	185	(55)
2020–2022	Panasonic Wild Knights	23	(5)
- Correct as of 29 May 2022
International career
Years	Team	Apps	(Points)
2010	England U20	9	(5)
2013	England A	2	(0)
2014–2020	England	45	(15)
2017	British & Irish Lions	1	(0)
- Correct as of 7 March 2020

George Edward John Kruis (born 22 February 1990) is an English former professional rugby union player. He played lock for Saracens and represented England and the British & Irish Lions. He was almost always used as a jumper in the line-out due to his height and athleticism.

== Early life ==
Kruis was born in Guildford, Surrey and was educated at Belmont Preparatory School and St John's School, Leatherhead. He played all of his youth rugby for Dorking RFC. Kruis was a relatively late developer in both physique and rugby terms, not really coming into his own until his sixth form years at School. In the Spring of 2007 Kruis and his Dorking RFC under-17 teammates won the U17 National Cup beating Altrincham Kersal in the final at Sixways Stadium. He continued his rapid ascent and enjoyed an exceptional season for the St John's, Leatherhead 1st XV in the winter of 2007, being selected to captain Surrey U18s. With some strong showings for the county he impressed enough to gain selection for London and South East U18s in the annual Divisional tournament at Broadstreet RFC. He started every game in the second row, captaining the team and scoring three tries in the final fixture against South West U18s.

Kruis was also eligible to play for Canada or the Netherlands as his Canadian father Leo is of Dutch ancestry.

== Club career ==
=== Saracens ===
==== 2008–2009 season ====
Kruis was offered a trial with Saracens in the summer of 2008. Having played in the A League fixtures, Kruis impressed and was kept on until the end of the 2008/09 season. He was also dual registered with Barking RFC during this season. Later in the season he agreed a 2-year professional contract covering the 2009/10 and 2010/11 seasons. He joined Saracens full-time from 1 July 2009.

==== 2009–2010 season ====
In the 2009–2010 season Kruis prospered under the trust shown in him by the Saracens staff. In November 2009 he made his club debut in an Anglo-Welsh Cup against Northampton Saints and was the standout player for the reserve side Saracens Storm being awarded the Saracens Storm Player of the Year. Kruis was also dual registered with Barking RFC again.

==== 2010–2011 season ====
Kruis saw continued first team action in the 2010/2011 season, making his premiership debut against London Irish in the London Double Header. Kruis also made his Heineken Cup debut playing in both the home and away fixtures against Racing Metro. This promising season was put on hold when Kruis fracture-dislocated his right wrist playing in a Saracens Storm match in early January. After surgery and a prolonged period of rehabilitation he made a comeback in April playing for Bedford Blues in the culmination of the RFU Championship season and the British and Irish Cup Final defeat to Bristol. Kruis also signed a new deal with Saracens.

==== 2011–2012 season ====
After a strong pre-season and with the 2011 Rugby World Cup in progress, Kruis became a regular first team player at the North London club. Kruis started in the 'Big Game 4' against Harlequins at Twickenham. It was watched by 82,000 people, creating a new world record for the largest attended regular season rugby match in the world. Kruis gained his first ever Premiership player of the match award against Wasps on 12 February 2012, having been chosen by ESPN commentator Ben Kay. Kruis then remarkably repeated this feat a week later against Leicester Tigers on 19 February 2012 when he was awarded player of the match live on Sky Sports by commentator Stuart Barnes. Kruis finished off the season well for Saracens playing in the Heineken Cup quarter-final and Premiership semi-final losses to Clermont Auvergne and Leicester respectively.

==== 2012–2013 season ====
With Kruis having increased in bulk over the pre-season programme many were tipping him for further recognition; this was until he suffered a small tear to his medial ligament playing in the Premiership Sevens event at the Stoop. After ten weeks out injured, he was back into first team recognition. Playing at blindside flanker, Kruis was named player of the match against Munster in the Heineken Cup by Stuart Barnes.

==== 2013 to 2020 ====
Kruis was a member of the Saracens team that beat Exeter Chiefs in the 2015 Anglo-Welsh Cup final. During his time at Saracens he won four Premiership titles in 2015, 2016, 2018 and 2019; with Kruis starting in all four finals.

Kruis also helped Saracens win the European Rugby Champions Cup three times in four seasons. In 2016 they defeated Racing 92 to become champions of Europe for the first time. The following season saw Kruis score a try in the 2017 European Rugby Champions Cup Final as Sarries beat Clermont at Murrayfield to retain their title. His last European trophy came in the 2019 final against Leinster at St James' Park.

=== Panasonic Wild Knights ===
Kruis left England to join Japanese side Panasonic Wild Knights ahead of the 2020–21 campaign. Kruis spent two seasons in Japan winning consecutive titles.

== International career ==
=== England ===
Kruis made his debut for the England U20 team during the 2010 Six Nations Under 20s Championship coming off the bench against Italy and Ireland. Later that year he played in all five games for the side that finished fourth at the 2010 IRB Junior World Championship. In January 2013 Kruis was called up to the England Saxons as an injury replacement for Tom Palmer. On 25 January 2013 Kruis made his Saxons debut in a win against Ireland Wolfhounds at Galway Sportsgrounds. The following weekend saw Kruis selected again at blindside flanker in a defeat against Scotland A at Kingston Park.

In October 2014 Kruis received his first call-up to the senior England squad by coach Stuart Lancaster for the Autumn International series. On 8 November 2014 he made his senior debut coming on as a replacement for Courtney Lawes in a defeat to New Zealand. He was a member of the England side that hosted the 2015 Rugby World Cup.

After the world cup new head coach Eddie Jones selected Kruis for the opening game of their 2016 Six Nations Championship against Scotland which saw him score his first International try. He also started in the final round as England defeated France to achieve their first Grand Slam in over a decade. Later that year he started all three tests on the tour of Australia which saw England complete a series whitewash.

Kruis scored his second career try against Italy during the 2019 Six Nations Championship and later that year his third and final try at International level in a warm-up game for the 2019 Rugby World Cup against Ireland. He was chosen for his second world cup and featured in the semi-final victory over New Zealand. In the 2019 Rugby World Cup Final he came off the bench at half-time to replace Courtney Lawes as England were defeated by South Africa to finish runners up.

Kruis last cap came against Wales in the 2020 Six Nations Championship which England won.

=== British and Irish Lions ===
Kruis was selected by coach Warren Gatland for the 2017 British & Irish Lions tour to New Zealand. His only cap for the Lions came in the opening test at Eden Park which ended in defeat. He did not participate in the remaining two tests of the series which eventually finished level.

=== Final game for Barbarians and retirement ===
In February 2022, Kruis announced that he would retire after completing the season with Japanese side Saitama Wild Knights. On 19 June 2022, he played his last professional game for the Barbarians in a victory against England at Twickenham which saw Kruis complete three conversions, including one with a backheel.

== International tries ==
As of 25 July 2019

Try	Opposing team	Location	Venue	Competition	Date	Result	Score
1	Scotland	Edinburgh, Scotland	Murrayfield	2016 Six Nations	6 February 2016	Win	15 – 9
2	Italy	London, England	Twickenham Stadium	2019 Six Nations	9 March 2019	Win	57 – 14
3	Ireland	London, England	Twickenham Stadium	2019 Rugby World Cup warm-up	25 July 2019	Win	57 – 15

== Honours ==
England

- Six Nations Championship: 2016, 2020
- Rugby World Cup runner-up: 2019

Saracens

- European Rugby Champions Cup: 2015-16, 2016-17, 2018-19
- Premiership: 2014-15, 2015-16, 2017-18, 2018-19
- Anglo-Welsh Cup: 2014-15

Saitama Wild Knights

- Japan Rugby League One: 2021, 2022
