= Alberto Lucchese =

- Born: 28 March 1986 (age 40) Treviso, Italy
- Height: 1.79 m (5 ft 10 in)
- Weight: 79 kg (174 lb; 12 st 6 lb)

Rugby union career
- Position: Scrum-Half
Youth career
- Benetton Treviso
Senior career
Years	Team	Apps	(Points)
2006−2009	Benetton Treviso	16	(0)
2009−2010	Venezia Mestre	12	(5)
2010−2014	Mogliano	77	(10)
2014	→Benetton Treviso	1	(0)
2014−2016	Benetton Treviso	31	(0)
- Correct as of 27 May 2020
International career
Years	Team	Apps	(Points)
2016	Italy	2	(0)
- Correct as of 30 May 2020

Alberto Lucchese (Treviso, 28 March 1986) is a retired Italian rugby union player and his usual position was Scrum-Half.

In the 2014–15 and 2015–16 Pro12 seasons, he played for Benetton Treviso.

In 2016 Lucchese was named in the Italy squad for the 2016 Six Nations and he represented it on 2 occasions.
