= Vincent Pelo =

France international rugby union player (born 1988)

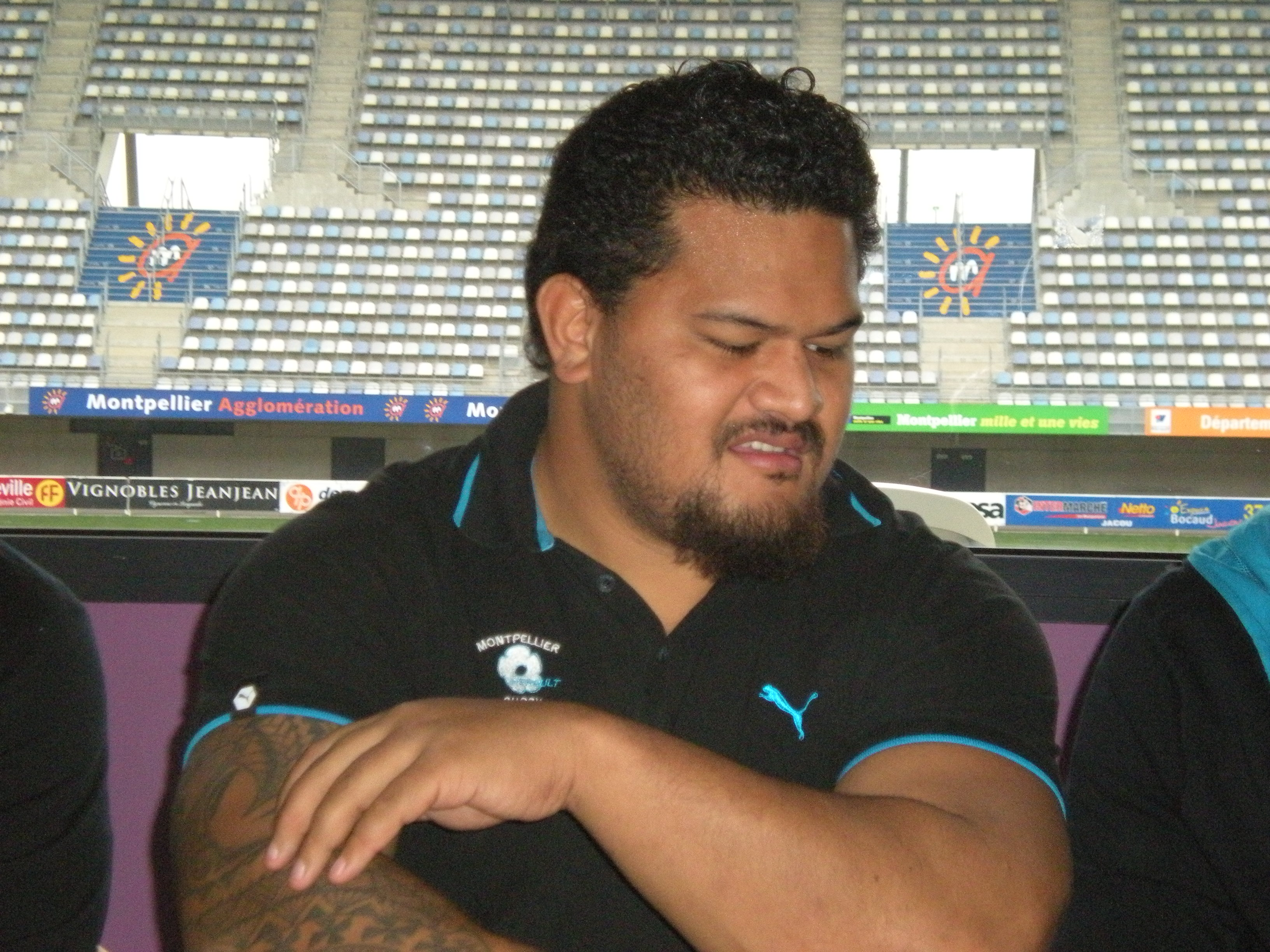
- Born: 22 April 1988 (age 38) Wallis, Wallis and Futuna
- Height: 1.87 m (6 ft 1 1/2 in)
- Weight: 135 kg (298 lb)

Rugby union career
- Position: Prop
Senior career
Years	Team	Apps	(Points)
2006–2012	Bourgoin	61	(30)
2012–2013	Montpellier	7	(5)
2013–2014	Bourgoin	21	(5)
2014–2020	La Rochelle	115	(20)
2021–	Bayonne	7	(0)
- Correct as of 30 April 2021
International career
Years	Team	Apps	(Points)
2008	France U-20		
2016–	France	2	(0)
- Correct as of 26 February 2016

Vincent Pelo (born 22 April 1988) is a French rugby union player. He is the cousin of Dimitri Pelo and Aliki Fakate. He currently plays for French club Bayonne as a Loosehead Prop. Pelo is a native of Wallis. He was part of the French national under-20 rugby union team at the 2008 IRB Junior World Championship.

He made his French international debut coming off the bench against Wales in the 2016 Six Nations Championship.
