= Camille Chat =

France international rugby union player

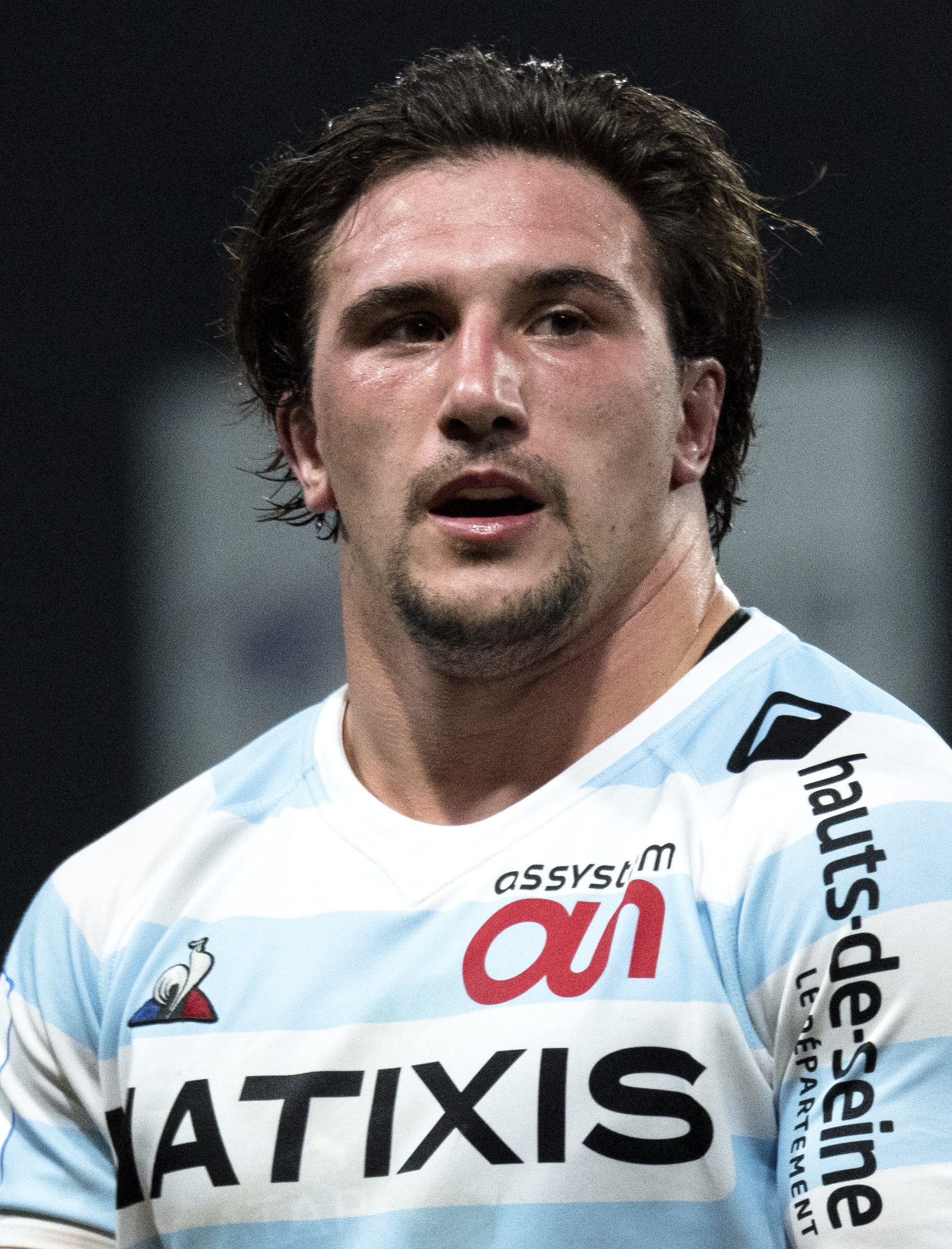
- Chat playing for Racing 92 in 2019
- Born: 18 December 1995 (age 30) Auxerre, France
- Height: 1.78 m (5 ft 10 in)
- Weight: 110 kg (243 lb; 17 st 5 lb)

Rugby union career
- Position: Hooker
Senior career
Years	Team	Apps	(Points)
2015–2025	Racing 92	188	(115)
2025–	Lyon	9	(20)
- Correct as of 24 May 2025
International career
Years	Team	Apps	(Points)
2014–2015	France U20	13	(10)
2016–	France	33	(10)
- Correct as of 13 April 2023

Camille Chat (born 18 December 1995) is a French professional rugby union player, who plays as a hooker for Top 14 side Lyon.

He was named in the French squad for the 2016 Six Nations Championship.

Chat is known for his physical strength, his energy and his muscular shape.

On 6 January 2025, Chat's contract with Racing 92, his team of twelve years, was terminated due to his arriving at a training session drunk two weeks prior.

== Honours ==
(France) Racing 92

- Top 14: 2015–16
