= Mattia Bellini =

Italian rugby union player

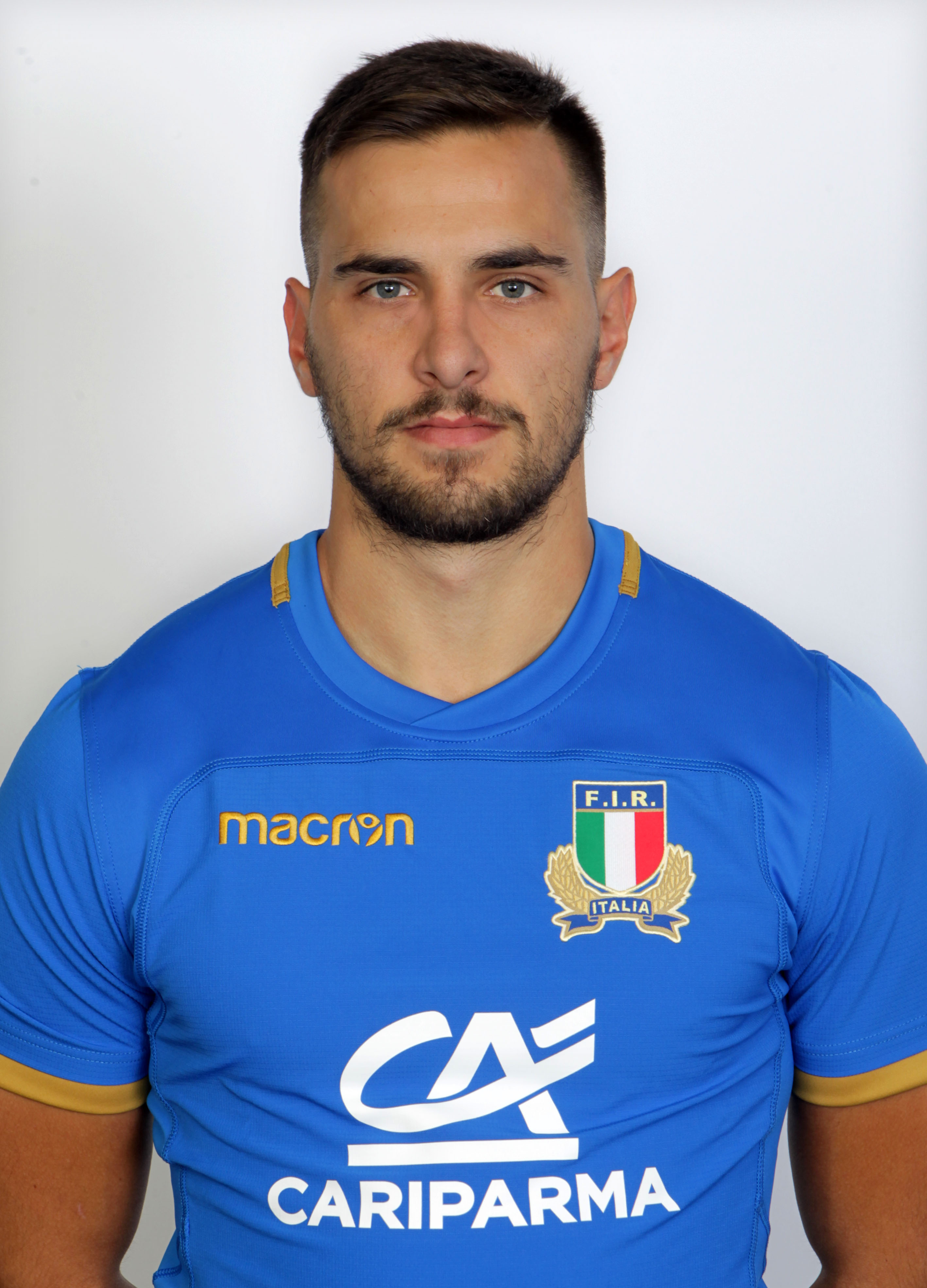
- Bellini in 2017
- Born: 8 February 1994 (age 32) Padova
- Height: 1.93 m (6 ft 4 in)
- Weight: 93 kg (14 st 9 lb; 205 lb)

Rugby union career
- Position: Wing
Youth career
- Petrarca Padova
Senior career
Years	Team	Apps	(Points)
2012−2016	Petrarca Padova	42	(65)
2015	→Zebre	3	(5)
2016−2022	Zebre	67	(105)
2022−2023	Benetton Rugby	12	(20)
2023−2025	Petrarca Padova		
- Correct as of 9 Oct 2022
International career
Years	Team	Apps	(Points)
2014	Italy Under 20	5	(0)
2016−2022	Italy	31	(55)
2022	Italy A	1	(5)
- Correct as of 24 Jun 2022
National sevens team
Years	Team		Comps
2014−2015	Italy		5
- Correct as of 19 November 2022

Mattia Bellini (born 8 February 1994) is a former Italian rugby union player. His position was on the wing and

In September 2015, Bellini played with Zebre in Pro12 as a "permit player". He previously played for Petrarca. He played with Zebre from 2016 to April 2022. Bellini played for Benetton in the United Rugby Championship for the end of 2021−22 season and 2022−23 season. In 2023, he come back to Petrarca Padova in Italian Serie A Elite and he played for it until 2025.

In 2014, Bellini was named in the Italy Under 20 squad and in 2014 and 2015, he was also named in the Italy Sevens squad. In 2022, he was named in Italy A squad for an official test.

Bellini was named in the Italian squad for the 2016 Six Nations Championship. He made his debut on 6 February against France On 18 August 2019, he was named in the final 31-man squad for the 2019 Rugby World Cup.
