= David Odiete =

Italy international rugby union player

David Michael Odiete
- Born: 8 February 1993 (age 33) Reggio Emilia
- Height: 1.80 m (5 ft 11 in)
- Weight: 104 kg (16 st 5 lb; 229 lb)

Rugby union career
- Position(s): Wing, Full back
- Current team: Stade Niçois
Youth career
- 2008–2011: Rugby Reggio
Senior career
Years	Team	Apps	(Points)
2011–2012	F.I.R. Academy		
2012–2015	Zebre	41	(13)
2015–2016	Mogliano	16	(117)
2016–2017	Treviso	16	(20)
2017–2020	Rovigo Delta	49	(206)
2020–2022	Stade Dijonnais	38	(85)
2022–	Stade Niçois		
International career
Years	Team	Apps	(Points)
2012−2013	Italy under 20	16	(21)
2014	Emerging Italy	3	(0)
2015−2016	Italy Seven	10	(5)
2016	Italy	7	(5)
- Correct as of 26 June 2016

David Michael Odiete (born 24 February 1993) is an Italian rugby union player of Nigerian descent. His position is on the wing and he currently plays for Stade Niçois.

He was named in the Italian squad for the 2016 Six Nations Championship and made his debut on 6 February against France

From 2012 to 2015, he played with Zebre in Pro12 and during the 2016–17 Pro12 season, he played for Benetton Treviso. From 2020 to 2022 he played for Stade Dijonnais.
