= Virimi Vakatawa =

France international rugby union player (born 1992)

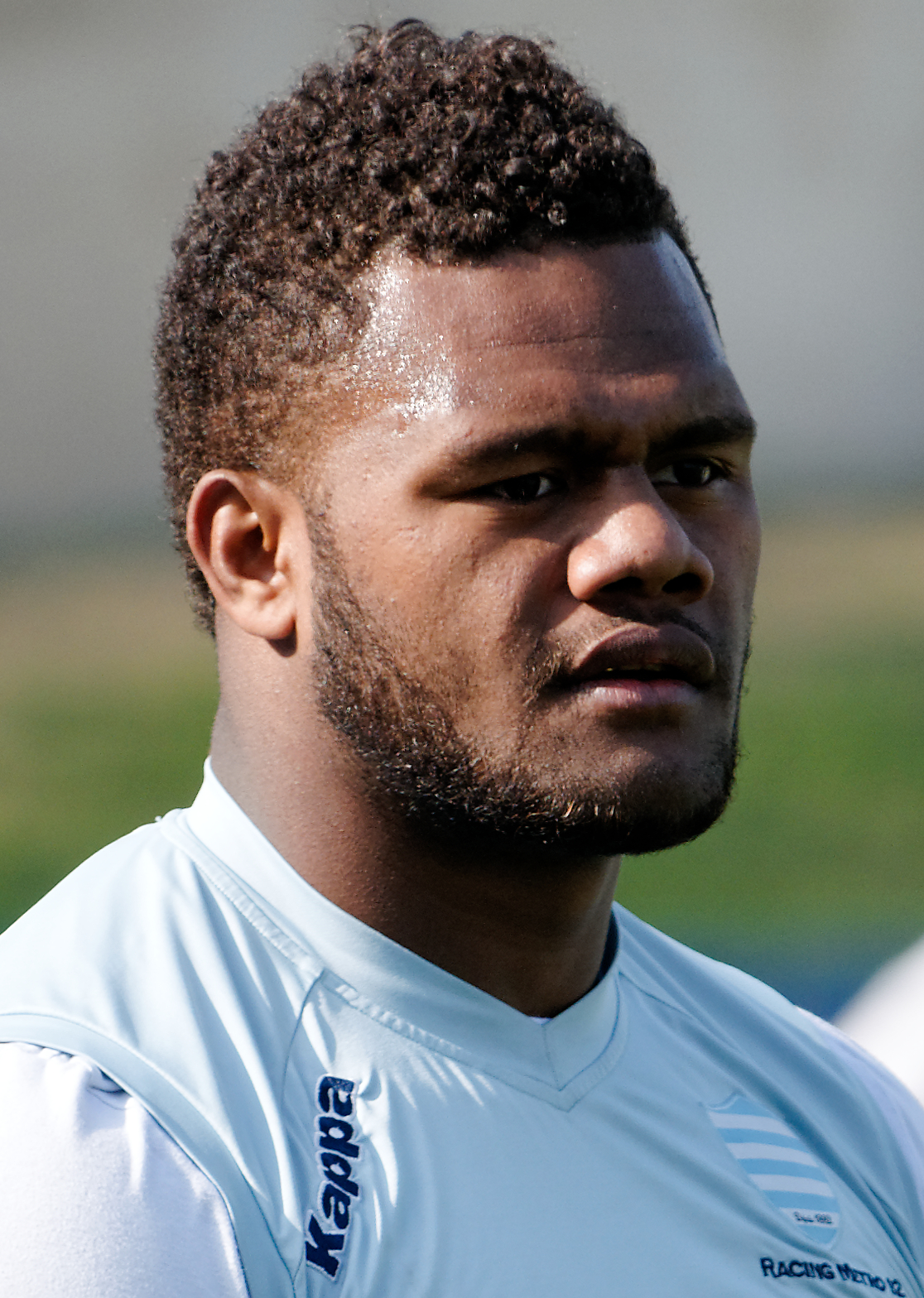
- Vakatawa with Racing 92 in 2012
- Born: Virimi Vakatawa; 1 May 1992 (age 34) Rangiora, New Zealand
- Height: 1.86 m (6 ft 1 in)
- Weight: 99 kg (218 lb)

Rugby union career
- Position(s): Centre, Wing
- Current team: Bristol Bears
Youth career
- Naluwai RC
- Nasinu Secondary School
- 2010–2011: Racing 92
Senior career
Years	Team	Apps	(Points)
2011–2013	Racing 92	44	(45)
2017–2022	Racing 92	101	(200)
2023–2024	Bristol Bears	16	(20)
International career
Years	Team	Apps	(Points)
2016–2022	France	31	(50)
National sevens team
Years	Team		Comps
2014–2017	France		82

Virimi Vakatawa (born 1 May 1992) is a New Zealand-born French professional rugby union player who plays as a centre or a wing for Super Rugby club Fijian Drua and formerly the French national team.

Arriving in France in 2010 and having obtained a French passport, he joined the France sevens team in 2014 before playing for the France national rugby union team since 2016 and the Six Nations Championship.

In September 2022, he suddenly retired from professional rugby due to a heart condition. On 27 September 2023, it was confirmed that he was returning to Rugby after signing for Bristol Bears.

== Early life ==
Vakatawa was born in Rangiora, New Zealand on 1 May 1992, before moving to Naluwai, Fiji, his family village in Naitasiri Province. He holds Fijian citizenship and started rugby with his hometown club at 9 years old. He then joined Nasinu Secondary School, a famous rugby playing school in Fiji. He played both rugby league and rugby union before joining the Fiji national under-19 rugby union team at 17 years old.

== Club career ==
Vakatawa was spotted and recruited by France-based Fijian winger Sireli Bobo, joining Racing Métro 92 in 2010. He was mentored by another former flying Fijian in Simon Raiwalui. He played his first game in the 2010–11 Heineken Cup where he scored his first try against Leinster.

On 13 June 2017, it was confirmed that he would be rejoining Racing 92 for the 2017–18 season.

He ended the 2018–19 Top 14 season as the top try-scorer for the competition with 13 tries.

He lost in final with his team in the 2017–18 European Rugby Champions Cup and the 2019–20 European Rugby Champions Cup.

On 5 September 2022, Racing 92 unexpectedly announced that Vakatawa was forced to retire from professional rugby, with immediate effect, due to a cardiac pathology.

On 27 September 2023, English premiership side Bristol Bears announced that Vakatawa had signed a contract "until the end of the 2023/24 season". This after a panel of experts in sports cardiology cleared him to play professional rugby.

== International career ==
In 2013, Vakatawa became eligible to represent France. He was released from his contract by Racing 92 and joined the French sevens team. He became a star in rugby sevens for France and played at 2016 Summer Olympics in Rio de Janeiro.

He won the 2014 Rugby Europe Sevens Grand Prix Series and the 2015 Rugby Europe Sevens Grand Prix Series with the France sevens team, and was chosen in the 2015-16 World Rugby Sevens Series dream team.

On 19 January 2016, Vakatawa was named in France's rugby union squad for the Six Nations Tournament by Guy Novès. He has been labelled as the French answer to All Black Sonny Bill Williams. He made his debut against Italy scoring a try.

On 24 May 2016, Vakatawa signed a two-year deal with the FFR so that he would exclusively play for the French 7s and 15s national teams.

In October 2016, he was included again in the French 15's team even though he has yet to play for a Top 14 team. He played his first game on the wing against Samoa, scoring three tries. He played a week later against Australia scoring a try in their 23-25 loss. He partnered Noa Nakaitaci on the wings and was renamed alongside Noa in their final test of the year against New Zealand. He was also named in the French 7's team for the 2016 Dubai Sevens a week later and won the first-ever DHL Impact Player of the Tournament award. With France, he finished in the third place in the 2017 Six Nations Championship.

On 13 June 2017, it was announced that Vakatawa and the Federation had agreed to release him from his contract so that he could be able to find a club and play rugby union full-time. As part of this new deal however, he would still be available for the 2018 Rugby World Cup Sevens in the Bay Area but was ultimately not called up in the squad. He played his last game with the France sevens team at the 2017 Paris Sevens and was never called up to the team again.

In 2019, he played with France at the Rugby World Cup in Japan, scoring two tries in three games.

Vakatawa finished second with France national team again in the 2020 Six Nations Championship and the 2021 Six Nations Championship.

On 3 October 2025 at 4pm Fiji Time, the Fijian Drua posted on their Official Facebook Page, Instagram and X (Twitter) about their contracted players that will be representing local provincial team, hinting his name along with the signed players. The posts was later removed from the Fijian Drua social media official website after 55 minutes from the posted time.

He made his return to club rugby by joining the Naitasiri Rugby team for the 2025 Skipper Cup, he made his debut on 4 October against Suva and helped them win the Farebrother-Sullivan Trophy.

Saturday 1 November, he played second five eight for Naitasiri in the Skipper Cup Final against Malolo. Malolo won 41-26.

=== International tries ===
#	Date	Venue	Opponent	Result (FRA–Opponent)	Competition
1.	6 February 2016	Stade de France, Saint-Denis, France	Italy	23–21	2016 Six Nations Championship
2.	12 November 2016	Stadium Municipal, Toulouse, France	Samoa	52–8	2016 November test series
3.	12 November 2016	Stadium Municipal, Toulouse, France	Samoa	52–8	2016 November test series
4.	12 November 2016	Stadium Municipal, Toulouse, France	Samoa	52–8	2016 November test series
5.	19 November 2016	Stade de France, Saint-Denis, France	Australia	23–25	2016 November test series
6.	11 March 2017	Stadio Olimpico, Rome, Italy	Italy	40–18	2017 Six Nations Championship
7.	6 October 2019	Kumamoto Stadium, Kumamoto, Japan	Tonga	23–21	2019 Rugby World Cup
8.	20 October 2019	Ōita Stadium, Ōita, Japan	Wales	19–20	2019 Rugby World Cup
9.	31 October 2020	Stade de France, Saint-Denis, France	Ireland	35–27	2020 Six Nations Championship
10.	22 November 2020	Murrayfield Stadium, Edinburgh, Scotland	Scotland	22–15	2020 Autumn Nations Cup

== Playing style ==
Vakatawa is very versatile, being comfortable at the centre and at the wing, even if he prefers to play as a centre. He was progressively moved at the outside centre by his former Racing 92 backs coach Laurent Labit, who then coached him in the France national team. Virimi Vakatawa is regarded as possessing high pace, power and intelligence. His offloads passes are also praised and he is renowned for his acceleration, footwork, vision and creativity to find spaces and exploit gaps in defences.

== Personal life ==
Vakatawa obtained French nationality after learning French language and France national anthem La Marseillaise.

His cousin is Fijian-born French international rugby union player Noa Nakaitaci.

== Honours ==
=== Racing 92 ===
- European Rugby Champions Cup runner-up: 2017–18, 2019–20

=== France ===
- Six Nations Championship runner-up: 2020, 2021

=== France 7's ===
- Sevens Grand Prix Series: 2014, 2015
