= Jack Clifford (rugby union) =

England international rugby union player

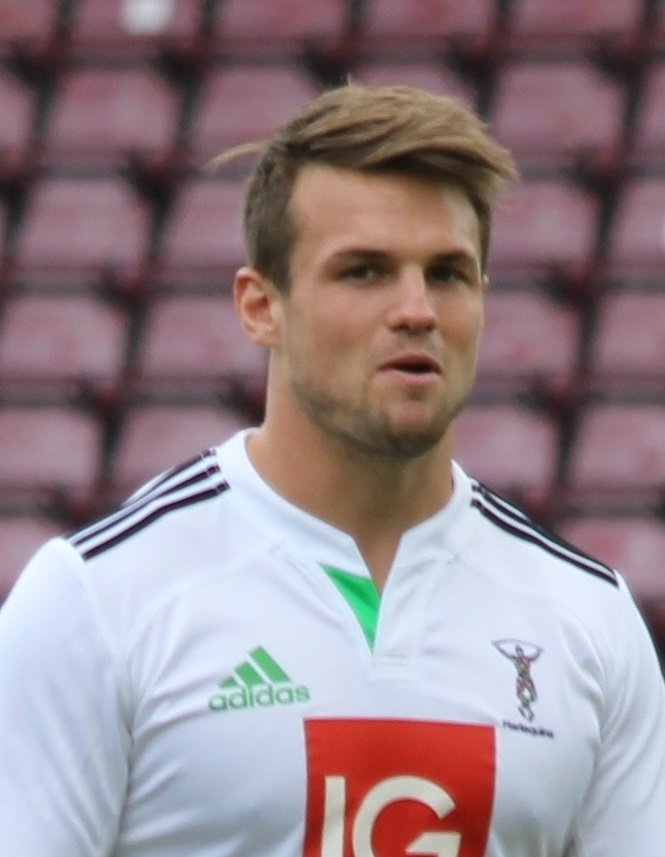
- Clifford playing for Harlequins in 2014
- Born: 12 February 1993 (age 33) Brisbane, Australia
- Height: 1.94 m (6 ft 4 in)
- Weight: 111 kg (17 st 7 lb)
- School: Tillingbourne School; Royal Grammar School

Rugby union career
- Position(s): Number 8, Openside Flanker, Blindside Flanker
Senior career
Years	Team	Apps	(Points)
2012–2020	Harlequins	100	(110)
2011-2012, 2013-2014	→ Ealing Trailfinders	11	(35)
2012–2013	→ Esher	17	(55)
- Correct as of 29 May 2016
International career
Years	Team	Apps	(Points)
2010–2011	England U18	13	(20)
2012–2013	England U20	20	(35)
2016-2017	England	10	(5)
- Correct as of 27 February 2017
National sevens team
Years	Team		Comps
2014–	England		7

Jack Clifford (born 12 February 1993) is a former rugby union player for the England national rugby union team and Premiership side Harlequins. Clifford played in the back row at flanker or number 8. He first captained Harlequins in November 2015 in a match against Cardiff Blues

== Club career ==
Clifford began playing rugby age 11 for Cranleigh Mini's and Cobham youths before joining Harlequins Academy two years later. He played for Cobham Rugby club from age 13 in which they had a five-year unbeaten record. He was dual registered with National League 1 side Ealing Trailfinders for the 2011–12 season and made his first appearance in senior rugby on 7 January 2012 against Jersey. He joined Esher on a similar agreement the following season and also made his senior debut for Harlequins in November 2012 as a replacement in the 31–30 Anglo-Welsh Cup win over Northampton Saints. In 2013, he re-joined Ealing on dual registration terms.

He was forced to retire through injury in August 2020.

== International career ==
Born in Brisbane, Australia to a Kenyan father and an English mother, Clifford has captained England under-18 and under-20 level. This included England's victory in the Under-20s World Cup in 2013.

In March 2014 he was named in the England Sevens squad for two legs of the Sevens World Series in Japan and Hong Kong. In May 2015 he was selected for an England XV to play against the Barbarians. Clifford scored a try in the match.

Clifford received his first call up to the senior England squad by new coach Eddie Jones on 13 January 2016 for the 2016 Six Nations Championship.

He made his full debut as a replacement for Chris Robshaw during the Calcutta Cup match against Scotland on 6 February 2016 after 69 minutes.

=== International tries ===
As of 7 July 2019

Try	Opposing team	Location	Venue	Competition	Date	Result	Score
1	Wales	London, England	Twickenham Stadium	2016 Summer Tour Warm-Up	29 May 2016	Win	27 – 13
