= Andrea Lovotti =

Italy international rugby union player

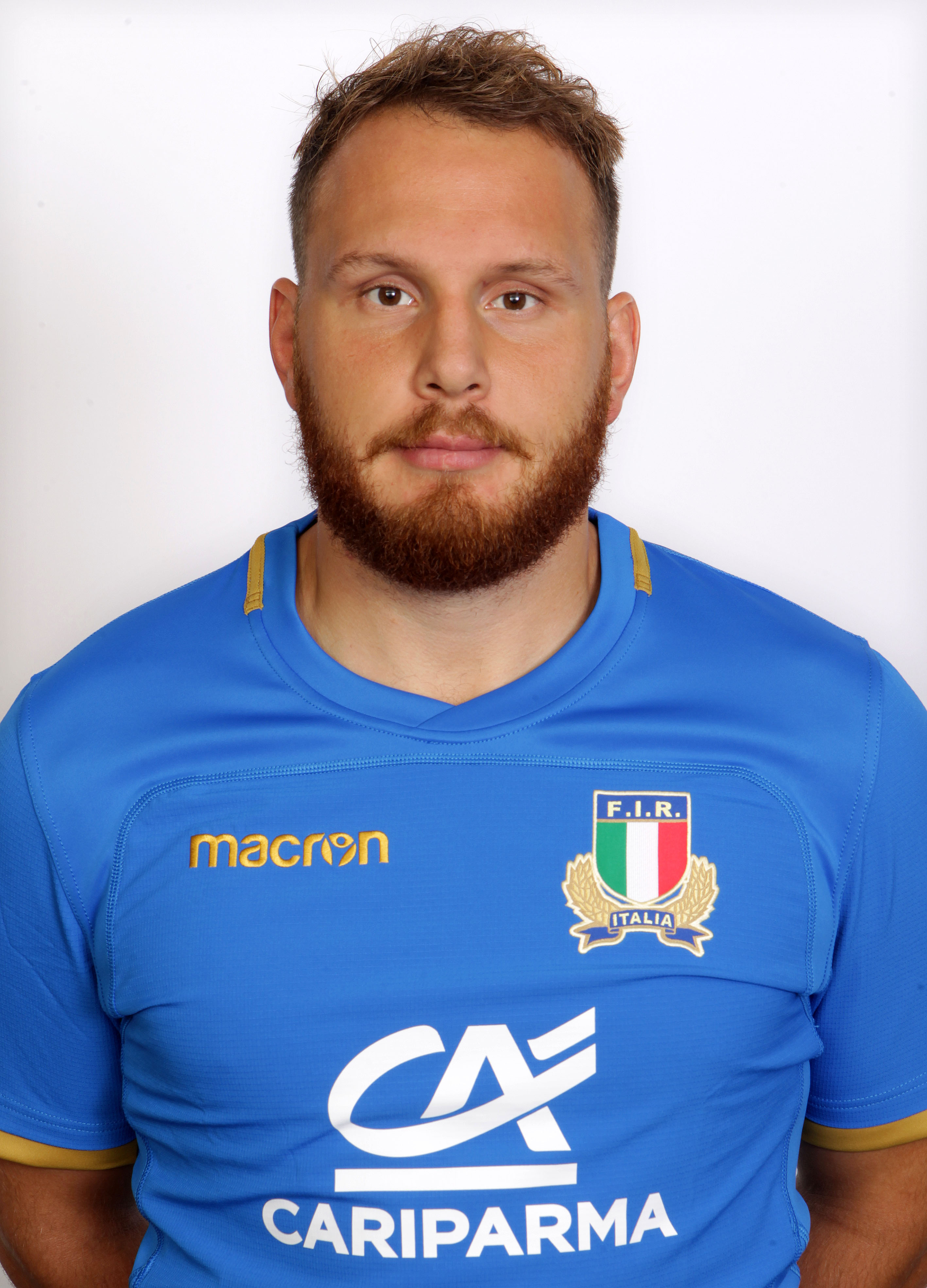
- Lovotti in 2017
- Full name: Andrea Lovotti
- Born: 28 July 1989 (age 37) Piacenza, Italy
- Height: 1.83 m (6 ft 0 in)
- Weight: 111 kg (17 st 7 lb; 245 lb)

Rugby union career
- Position: Prop
Youth career
- Until 2008: Gossolengo Rugby
- 2008-2009: Rugby Calvisano
Senior career
Years	Team	Apps	(Points)
2009–2010	Rugby Livorno 1931	20	(10)
2010−2011	Crociati	19	(5)
2011−2014	Calvisano	74	(15)
2014−2022	Zebre	116	(5)
2022−2025	Colorno	57	
- Correct as of 19 Mar 2022
International career
Years	Team	Apps	(Points)
2009	Italy Under 20	10	(0)
2011−2014	Emerging Italy	8	(0)
2016−2022	Italy	47	(0)
- Correct as of 20 Mar 2021

Andrea Lovotti (born 28 July 1989) was an Italian rugby union player who plays as a Prop. He played for Colorno in Top10.

== Career ==
He grew up in the youth sporting team of Piacenza Gossolengo, in 2008–09 season, he passed to Rugby Calvisano. After beginning down the ranks of the Italian system, he returned to his previous youth club Calvisano at the top flight of the National Championship of Excellence where he immediately won the title of Champion of Italy and the Excellence Trophy. In May 2014, it was announced that he moved to Zebre. He played for Zebre until 2021–22 United Rugby Championship season.

In 2009, Lovotti was named in the Italy Under 20 squad and from 2012 to 2014 he was part of Emerging Italy squad.

On 4 June 2015, he was named in the training squad for the 2015 Rugby World Cup., but he didn't play. In 2016 Lovotti had the first call with Italy. On 18 August 2019, he was named in the final 31-man squad for the 2019 Rugby World Cup. He was sent off against South Africa in the 2019 Rugby World Cup group stages for a spear tackle on Springbok No 8 Duane Vermuelen after the whistle had been blown. Such "crass stupidity" in the words of Italy coach Conor O'Shea cost Italy the match.

== Honours ==
- National Championship of Excellence
  - Champions Calvisano: 2010-2011
- Coppa Italia
  - Champions Calvisano: 2010-2011
