= Marco Fuser =

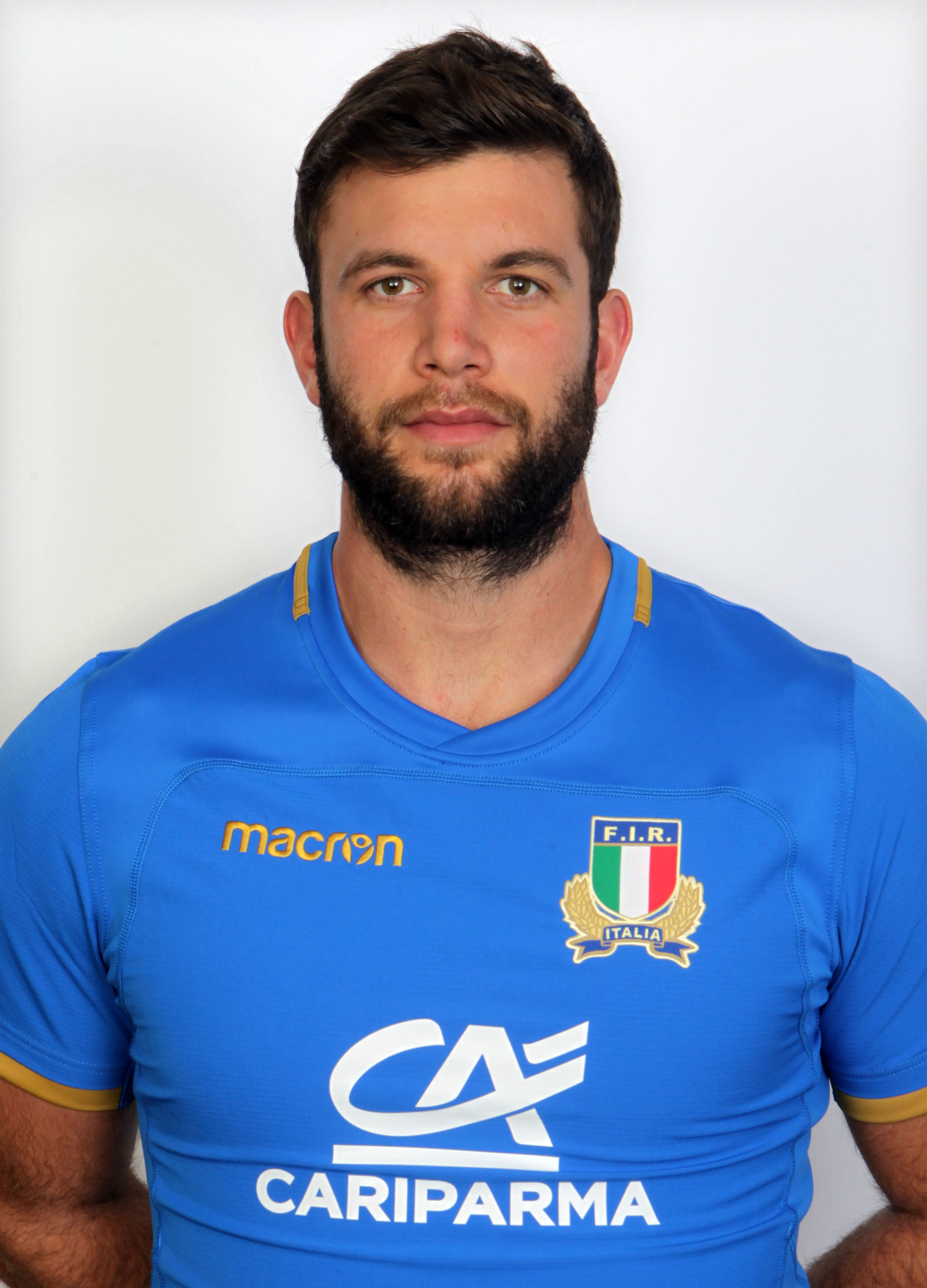
- Fuser representing the Italian Rugby Federation, October 2017
- Born: 9 March 1991 (age 35) Villorba, Italy
- Height: 198 cm (6 ft 6 in)
- Weight: 116 kg (256 lb; 18 st 4 lb)

Rugby union career
- Position: Lock
Youth career
- Mogliano Rugby
Senior career
Years	Team	Apps	(Points)
2011–2012	Mogliano	17	(0)
2012–2020	Benetton	119	(35)
2020–2022	Newcastle Falcons	20	(10)
2022–2023	Massy	16	(0)
2023–2024	Valorugby Emilia	4	(0)
- Correct as of 12 November 2022
International career
Years	Team	Apps	(Points)
2010–2011	Italy U20	7	(0)
2012–2022	Italy	41	(5)
2013	Italy A	3	(0)
- Correct as of 12 November 2022

Marco Fuser (born 9 March 1991) is a retired Italian professional rugby union player who primarily played lock. He has also represented Italy at international level on 41 occasions with 1 try. Fuser has previously played for clubs such as Mogliano, Benetton, and Newcastle Falcons in the past.

== Professional career ==
From 2012 to 2020, he played for Benetton Treviso. From 2020 to 2022, he played for Newcastle Falcons in the Premiership Rugby, first to sign for French team Massy. In 2023-24 season he played for Valorugby Emilia in the Italian Serie A Elite.

In May 2012, Fuser was called up by the Italian national rugby union team against Canada. On 14 June, he made his international debut for Italy against Canada for the 2012 Summer Internationals. On 24 August 2015, he was named in the final 31-man squad for the 2015 Rugby World Cup.
