= Jefferson Poirot =

French rugby union player (born 1992)

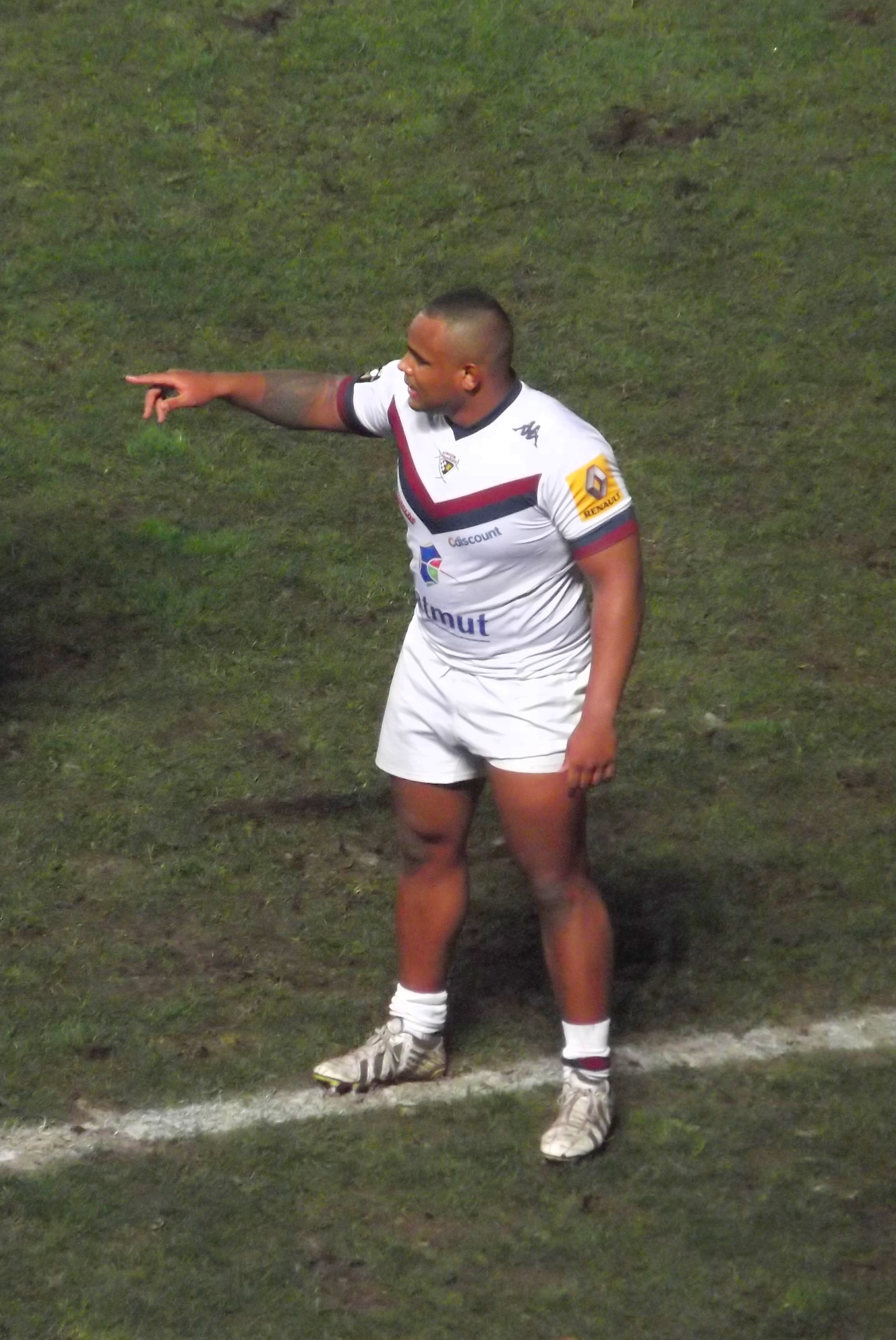
- Poirot with Bordeaux in 2014
- Born: 1 November 1992 (age 34) L'Isle-Adam, France
- Height: 1.81 m (5 ft 11 1/2 in)
- Weight: 123 kg (19 st 5 lb; 271 lb)

Rugby union career
- Position: Prop
Senior career
Years	Team	Apps	(Points)
2011–2012	Brive	10	(0)
2012–	Bordeaux Bègles	252	(60)
- Correct as of 25 May 2025
International career
Years	Team	Apps	(Points)
2016–2020	France	36	(5)
- Correct as of 5 Mar 2023

Jefferson Poirot (French: [ʒɛfɛʁsɔn pwaʁo]; born 1 November 1992) is a French rugby union player. His position is prop and he currently plays for Bordeaux Bègles in the Top 14. He was named in the French squad for the 2016 Six Nations Championship.

Poirot was born in France, to a Nigerian father and French mother.

== International tries ==
International tries
No.	Date	Venue	Opponent	Score	Result	Competition
1	2 October 2019	Fukuoka Hakatanomori Stadium, Fukuoka, Japan	United States	31–9	33–9	2019 Rugby World Cup

== Honours ==
Bordeaux Bègles

- 2× European Rugby Champions Cup: 2025, 2026
