= Guilhem Guirado =

French rugby union player (born 1986)

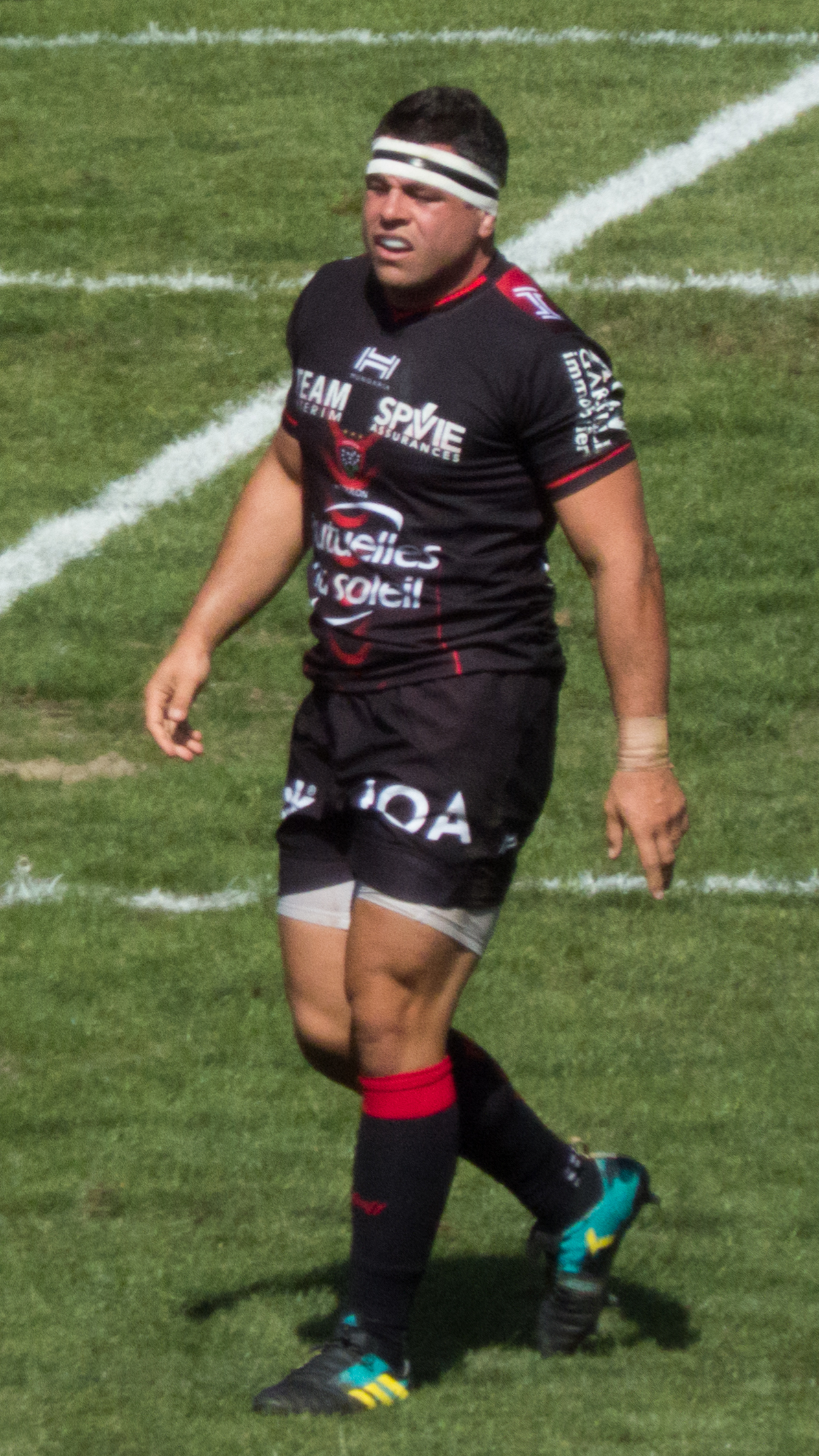
- Guilhem Guirado 2018-09
- Born: Guilhem Guirado; 17 June 1986 (age 40) Céret, France
- Height: 1.80 m (5 ft 11 in)
- Weight: 109 kg (17 st 2 lb; 240 lb)

Rugby union career
- Position: Hooker
- Current team: Montpellier
Amateur team(s)
Years	Team	Apps	(Points)
- Arles-sur-Tech
Senior career
Years	Team	Apps	(Points)
2005–2014	Perpignan	202	(100)
2014–2019	Toulon	110	(55)
2019–2022	Montpellier	45	(20)
International career
Years	Team	Apps	(Points)
2006	France U21	5	(0)
2008–2019	France	74	(40)

Guilhem Guirado (born 17 June 1986) is a former French rugby union player. During his 17-year career, he played for Perpignan, Toulon, and Montpellier. Guirado was also the captain of France from 2016 to 2019.

== Honours ==
Perpignan:

1x Top 14 (2009)

Toulon:

1x Champions Cup (2015)

Montpellier:

1x Top 14 (2022)

1x Challenge Cup (2021)

== Career ==
Guirado first appeared on the professional scene playing for Perpignan from 2005, having joined from amateur junior side Arles-sur-Tech. In 2006, he was selected to play for the French U21 side in the 2006 Under 21 Rugby World Championship. He played in all matches, including the grand final against South Africa at the Stade Marcel-Michelin. Three years later, he helped his club side Perpignan secure a 7th Top 14 title in the 2008–09 Top 14 season, beating Clermont 22–13. He was also part of the Perpignan side that came second the following year, that time losing to Clermont 19–6. His excellent form during 2008–09 season saw him selected for the French national side for the 2008 Six Nations Championship. He earned his first cap off the bench in the closing week of the tournament against Italy on 9 March 2008. On that occasion, Les Blues were victorious 25–13. It was not until his sixth cap that Guirado earned his first start. Starting as Hooker against Fiji during the 2010 rugby union internationals. He was part of the French side that were runners-up to the All Blacks in the 2011 Rugby World Cup, though he only played in one game – against Canada on 18 September.

From the 2013–14 Top 14 season, Guirado joined Toulon, who were both European and French Champions, after Perpignan failed to stay in top division. He had already become first choice Hooker at international level, having started in every test against Australia during France's Test tour of Australia in 2014. He made his first appearance for Toulon against Bayonne, with Toulon winning 29–15.

Guirado later took part in the World Cup in 2015, a tournament which was a major disappointment in France. In the quarter-final, France lost 62-13 to New Zealand.

In 2015, after Guy Novès' nomination as Head Coach, he became captain of the national team. The level of the team then gradually improved, as players managed to play in a "French Flair"- based style. Playing very well for his club (Rugby Club de Toulon), and also impressing for the national team, the Frenchman's attitude and professionalism was praised by the press. Guy Novès also showered Guirado with praise, saying he was likely to be captain of the national team until his retirement, or at least until the end of Novès' head coach's mandate.

Guirado retired from international rugby in 2022.

== Personal life ==
Born in France, Guirado is of Catalan descent.

Preceded by Thierry Dusautoir	French national rugby union captain 2015–2019	Succeeded by Charles Ollivon
