= Quintin Geldenhuys =

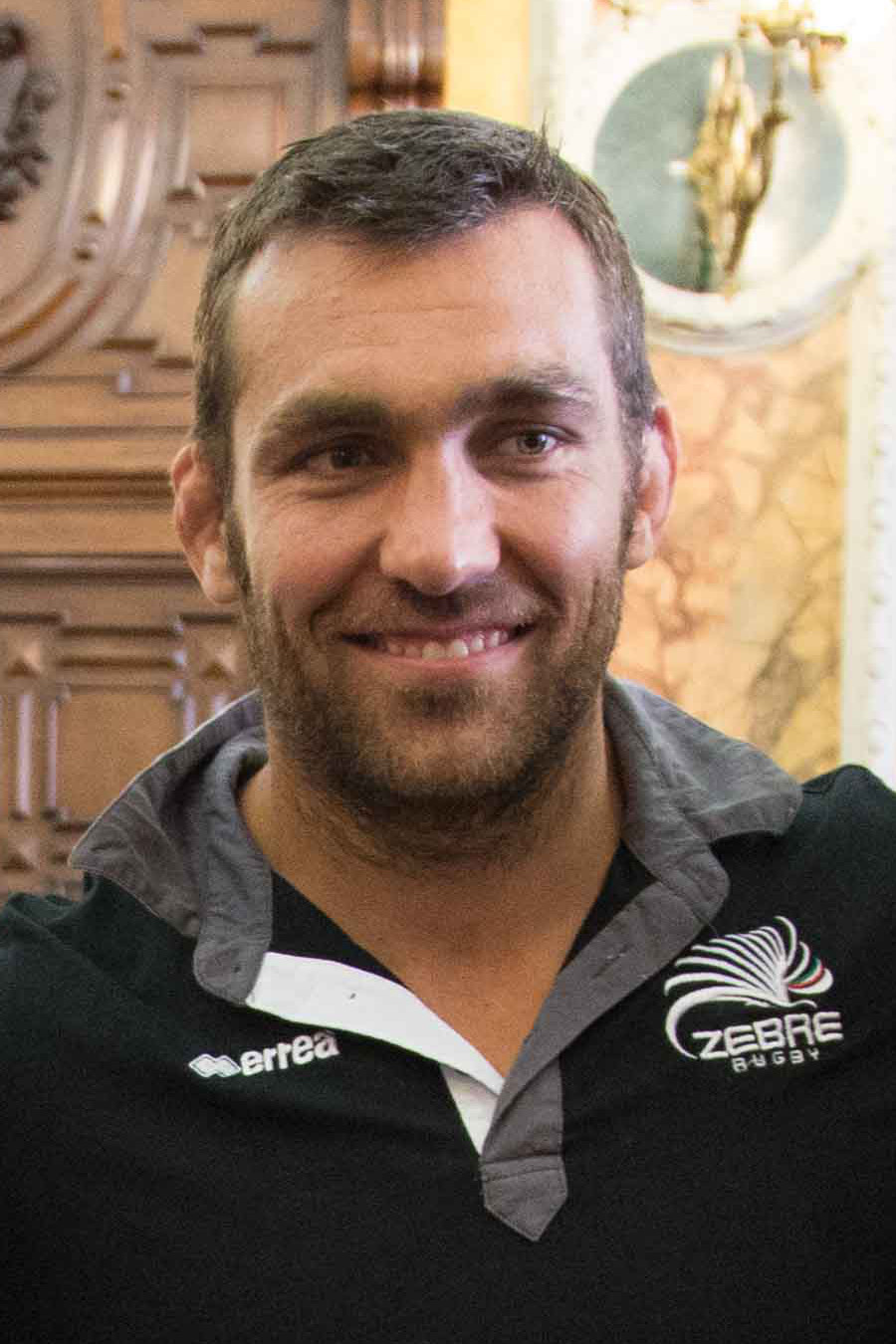
- Born: Quintin Geldenhuys; 19 June 1981 (age 45) Krugersdorp, South Africa
- Height: 2.03 m (6 ft 8 in)
- Weight: 116 kg (256 lb; 18 st 4 lb)
- School: Hoërskool Monument
- University: Boston Business College

Rugby union career
- Position: Lock
Senior career
Years	Team	Apps	(Points)
2003–05	Pumas	6	(10)
2005–10	Viadana	96	(25)
2010–12	Aironi	34	(5)
2012–17	Zebre	78	(10)
- Correct as of 28 March 2017
International career
Years	Team	Apps	(Points)
2009–2016	Italy	67	(0)
- Correct as of 26 March 2017

Quintin Geldenhuys (born 19 June 1981) is a South Africa-born Italian rugby union player. Geldenhuys, who played lock, represented the Italian URC franchise Zebre. He made his debut for Italy against Australia on 13 June 2009. He qualified for Italy through residency. He played 11 games, starting 11, playing 796 minutes in the 2015-2016 Guinness Pro12 series. Geldenhuys is currently the Director of Rugby at Trio High School in Kroonstad the Northern Free State region of South Africa.
