= 2016 France rugby union tour of Argentina =

- Coach: Guy Novès
- Tour captain: Jules Plisson
- Top test point scorer: Jules Plisson (14)
- Top test try scorer: 4 players with 1 try
Summary
P	W	D	L
Total
2	1	0	1
Test match
2	1	0	1
Opponent
P	W	D	L
Argentina
2	1	0	1

Tour chronology
- ← Australia 2014 South Africa 2017 →

In June 2016, France played a two-test series against Argentina as part of the 2016 mid-year rugby union tests. They played Los Pumas across the two weeks that were allocated to the June International window (19 June and 25 June), and which were part of the fourth year of the global rugby calendar established by the International Rugby Board, which runs through to 2019. This was the first French tour to Argentina since their drawn series in 2012.

The French domestic Top 14 tournament ended later than usual, as no games were scheduled during the pool phase of the 2015 Rugby World Cup. Therefore, the semi-finals and final of the 2015–16 season coincided with the June international window, clashing with the French games on the 19 and 25 June.

== Fixtures ==
Date	Venue	Home	Score	Away
19 June 2016	Estadio Monumental José Fierro, Tucumán	Argentina	30–19	France
25 June 2016	Estadio Monumental José Fierro, Tucumán	Argentina	0–27	France

== Squads ==
Note: Ages, caps and clubs are as per 19 June, the first test match of the tour.

=== France ===
On 6 June, Guy Novès named the first set of players for France's two-test series against Argentina. The squad did not include any of the six Top 14 play-offs teams, Castres, Clermont, Toulon, Toulouse, Racing or Montpellier (except François Trinh-Duc who was released by Montpellier for the tour) due to the play-offs taking place between 11 and 24 June.

On 13 June, Novès named a further 11 players on top of the initial 17, after Toulouse and Castres were eliminated from the Top 14 quarter-finals.

On 19 June, Paul Jedrasiak was called up to the squad following Clermont Auvergne's elimination from the Top 14.

Coaching team:

- Head coach: (France) Guy Novès
- Forwards coach: (France) Yannick Bru
- Backs coach: (France) Jean-Frederic Dubois

Note: Flags indicate national union for the club/province as defined by World Rugby.

Player	Position	Date of birth (age)	Caps	Club/province
Rémi Bonfils	Hooker	16 September 1988 (aged 27)	0	(France) Stade Français
Clément Maynadier	Hooker	11 October 1988 (aged 27)	0	(France) Bordeaux Bègles
Uini Atonio	Prop	26 March 1990 (aged 26)	15	(France) La Rochelle
Lucas Pointud	Prop	18 January 1988 (aged 28)	0	(France) Brive
Jefferson Poirot	Prop	1 November 1992 (aged 23)	5	(France) Bordeaux Bègles
Rabah Slimani	Prop	18 October 1989 (aged 26)	26	(France) Stade Français
William Demotte	Lock	22 May 1991 (aged 25)	0	(France) Agen
Paul Jedrasiak	Lock	6 February 1993 (aged 23)	4	(France) Clermont Auvergne
Julien Le Devedec	Lock	4 June 1986 (aged 30)	0	(France) Bordeaux Bègles
Yoann Maestri	Lock	14 January 1988 (aged 28)	47	(France) Toulouse
Fabrice Metz	Lock	23 January 1991 (aged 25)	0	(France) Oyonnax
Kélian Galletier	Flanker	18 March 1992 (aged 24)	0	(France) Montpellier
Loann Goujon	Flanker	23 April 1989 (aged 27)	10	(France) Bordeaux Bègles
Kevin Gourdon	Flanker	23 January 1990 (aged 26)	0	(France) La Rochelle
Raphaël Lakafia	Number 8	28 October 1988 (aged 27)	3	(France) Stade Français
Louis Picamoles	Number 8	5 February 1986 (aged 30)	52	(France) Toulouse
Sébastien Bezy	Scrum-half	22 November 1991 (aged 24)	5	(France) Toulouse
Baptiste Serin	Scrum-half	20 June 1994 (aged 21)	0	(France) Bordeaux Bègles
Jules Plisson	Fly-half	20 August 1991 (aged 24)	11	(France) Stade Français
François Trinh-Duc	Fly-half	11 November 1986 (aged 29)	53	(France) Montpellier
Jonathan Danty	Centre	7 October 1992 (aged 23)	3	(France) Stade Français
Gaël Fickou	Centre	26 March 1994 (aged 22)	19	(France) Toulouse
Rémi Lamerat	Centre	14 January 1990 (aged 26)	7	(France) Castres
Julien Rey	Centre	1 September 1986 (aged 29)	0	(France) Bordeaux Bègles
Djibril Camara	Wing	22 June 1989 (aged 26)	1	(France) Stade Français
Maxime Médard	Wing	16 November 1986 (aged 29)	46	(France) Toulouse
Xavier Mignot	Wing	27 January 1994 (aged 22)	0	(France) Grenoble
Hugo Bonneval	Fullback	19 November 1990 (aged 25)	6	(France) Stade Français
Geoffrey Palis	Fullback	8 July 1991 (aged 24)	0	(France) Castres

=== Argentina ===
On 31 May, Argentina named a 28-man squad for the June internationals against Italy and France.

On 12 June, Ignacio Larrague was called up to the squad as an injury replacement for Matías Alemanno.

On 16 June, Ramiro Herrera and Tomás Lavanini were called up to the squad ahead of the two-test series against France.

Coaching team:

- Head coach: (Argentina) Daniel Hourcade
- Defence coach: (Argentina) Pablo Bouza
- Backs coach: (Argentina) Germán Fernández
- Forwards coach: (Argentina) Emiliano Bergamaschi

Note: Flags indicate national union for the club/province as defined by World Rugby.

Player	Position	Date of birth (age)	Caps	Club/province
Facundo Bosch	Hooker	8 August 1991 (aged 24)	2	(Argentina) CUBA
Agustín Creevy (c)	Hooker	15 March 1985 (aged 31)	47	(Argentina) Jaguares
Julián Montoya	Hooker	29 October 1993 (aged 22)	17	(Argentina) Jaguares
Santiago García Botta	Prop	19 June 1992 (aged 24)	7	(Argentina) Jaguares
Facundo Gigena	Prop	15 September 1994 (aged 21)	1	(Argentina) Tala
Ramiro Herrera	Prop	14 February 1989 (aged 27)	20	(Argentina) Jaguares
Enrique Pieretto	Prop	15 December 1994 (aged 21)	2	(Argentina) Córdoba
Nahuel Tetaz Chaparro	Prop	6 November 1989 (aged 26)	23	(Argentina) Jaguares
Matías Alemanno	Lock	5 December 1991 (aged 24)	21	(Argentina) Jaguares
Ignacio Larrague	Lock	25 October 1995 (aged 20)	2	(Argentina) C.A.S.I
Tomás Lavanini	Lock	22 January 1993 (aged 23)	27	(Argentina) Jaguares
Guido Petti	Lock	17 November 1994 (aged 21)	13	(Argentina) Jaguares
Juan Manuel Leguizamón	Flanker	6 June 1983 (aged 33)	66	(Argentina) Jaguares
Tomás Lezana	Flanker	16 February 1994 (aged 22)	6	(Argentina) Jaguares
Pablo Matera	Flanker	18 July 1993 (aged 22)	23	(Argentina) Jaguares
Javier Ortega Desio	Flanker	14 June 1990 (aged 26)	20	(Argentina) Jaguares
Facundo Isa	Number 8	21 September 1993 (aged 22)	14	(Argentina) Jaguares
Gonzalo Bertranou	Scrum-half	31 December 1993 (aged 22)	1	(Argentina) Los Tordos
Tomás Cubelli	Scrum-half	12 June 1989 (aged 27)	46	(Australia) Brumbies
Martín Landajo	Scrum-half	14 June 1988 (aged 28)	54	(Argentina) Jaguares
Santiago González Iglesias	Fly-half	16 June 1988 (aged 28)	21	(Argentina) Jaguares
Nicolás Sánchez	Fly-half	26 October 1988 (aged 27)	40	(Argentina) Jaguares
Jerónimo de la Fuente	Centre	24 February 1991 (aged 25)	20	(Argentina) Jaguares
Juan Martín Hernández	Centre	7 August 1982 (aged 33)	59	(Argentina) Jaguares
Matías Moroni	Centre	29 March 1991 (aged 25)	9	(Argentina) Jaguares
Matías Orlando	Centre	14 November 1991 (aged 24)	10	(Argentina) Jaguares
Santiago Cordero	Wing	6 December 1993 (aged 22)	19	(Argentina) Jaguares
Lucas González Amorosino	Wing	2 November 1985 (aged 30)	49	(Argentina) Jaguares
Manuel Montero	Wing	20 November 1991 (aged 24)	22	(Argentina) Jaguares
Ramiro Moyano	Fullback	28 May 1990 (aged 26)	7	(Argentina) Jaguares
Joaquín Tuculet	Fullback	8 August 1989 (aged 26)	29	(Argentina) Jaguares

== Matches ==
=== First Test ===
19 June 2016
18:10 ART (UTC-03)

Argentina	30–19	France
Try: Montero 19' c Tuculet 28' c Petti 73' c Con: Sánchez (3/3) 20', 29', 74'; Pen: Sánchez (3/5) 16', 61', 65'	Report	Try: Bonfils 31' c Con: Plisson (1/1) 32'; Pen: Plisson (4/6) 10', 43', 48', 53'

Atlético Tucumán, S.M. Tucumán
Referee: John Lacey (Ireland)

Team details

Argentina

France

FB	15	Joaquín Tuculet		(substituted off) 75'
RW	14	Santiago Cordero
OC	13	Matías Moroni
IC	12	Juan Martín Hernández		(substituted off) 21'
LW	11	Manuel Montero
FH	10	Nicolás Sánchez
SH	9	Martín Landajo		(substituted off) 61'
N8	8	Facundo Isa
OF	7	Tomás Lezana		(substituted off) 59'
BF	6	Pablo Matera
RL	5	Javier Ortega Desio	(yellow card) 48' to 58'
LL	4	Guido Petti
TP	3	Ramiro Herrera
HK	2	Agustín Creevy (c)		(substituted off) 65'
LP	1	Nahuel Tetaz Chaparro		(substituted off) 79'
Replacements:
HK	16	Julián Montoya		(substituted on) 65'
PR	17	Santiago García Botta		(substituted on) 79'
PR	18	Enrique Pieretto
LK	19	Ignacio Larrague
FL	20	Juan Manuel Leguizamón		(substituted on) 59'
SH	21	Tomás Cubelli		(substituted on) 61'
FH	22	Santiago González Iglesias		(substituted on) 21'
FB	23	Ramiro Moyano		(substituted on) 75'
Coach:
(Argentina) Daniel Hourcade

FB	15	Hugo Bonneval
RW	14	Xavier Mignot
OC	13	Julien Rey
IC	12	Jonathan Danty		(substituted off) 62'
LW	11	Djibril Camara
FH	10	Jules Plisson (c)
SH	9	Baptiste Serin		(substituted off) 71'
N8	8	Kevin Gourdon		(substituted off) 62'	(substituted on) 75'
OF	7	Raphaël Lakafia		(substituted off) 37'
BF	6	Loann Goujon
RL	5	William Demotte
LL	4	Julien Le Devedec
TP	3	Rabah Slimani		(substituted off) 50'
HK	2	Rémi Bonfils		(substituted off) 67'
LP	1	Jefferson Poirot	(yellow card) 60' to 70'		(substituted off) 75'
Replacements:
HK	16	Clément Maynadier		(substituted on) 67'
PR	17	Uini Atonio		(substituted on) 50'
PR	18	Lucas Pointud		(substituted on) 62'
LK	19	Fabrice Metz		(substituted on) 75'
N8	20	Louis Picamoles		(substituted on) 37'
SH	21	Sébastien Bezy		(substituted on) 71'
FH	22	François Trinh-Duc		(substituted on) 75'
CE	23	Gaël Fickou		(substituted on) 62'
Coach:
(France) Guy Novès

Touch judges:
Stuart Berry (South Africa)
Luke Pearce (England)
Television match official:
Johan Greeff (South Africa)

Notes:

- Rémi Bonfils, William Demotte, Kevin Gourdon, Julien Le Devedec, Clément Maynadier, Fabrice Metz, Xavier Mignot, Lucas Pointud, Julien Rey and Baptiste Serin (all France) made their international debuts.

=== Second Test ===
25 June 2016
15:10 ART (UTC-03)

Argentina	0–27	France
	Report	Try: Bonneval 38' c Lamerat 50' c Goujon 62' c Con: Serin (3/3) 39', 51', 62'; Pen: Serin (2/2) 25', 44'

Atlético Tucumán, S.M. Tucumán
Referee: Wayne Barnes (England)

Team details

Argentina

France

FB	15	Joaquín Tuculet
RW	14	Santiago Cordero		(substituted off) 63'
OC	13	Matías Moroni		(substituted off) 67'
IC	12	Jerónimo de la Fuente
LW	11	Manuel Montero
FH	10	Nicolás Sánchez
SH	9	Tomás Cubelli		(substituted off) 58'
N8	8	Facundo Isa		(substituted off) 54'
OF	7	Javier Ortega Desio
BF	6	Pablo Matera		(substituted off) 51'
RL	5	Tomás Lavanini	(yellow card) 62' to 72'
LL	4	Guido Petti
TP	3	Ramiro Herrera		(substituted off) 71'
HK	2	Agustín Creevy (c)		(substituted off) 58'
LP	1	Nahuel Tetaz Chaparro		(substituted off) 63'
Replacements:
HK	16	Julián Montoya		(substituted on) 58'
PR	17	Santiago García Botta		(substituted on) 63'
PR	18	Enrique Pieretto		(substituted on) 71'
FL	19	Tomás Lezana		(substituted on) 51'
FL	20	Juan Manuel Leguizamón		(substituted on) 54'
SH	21	Martín Landajo		(substituted on) 58'
CE	22	Matías Orlando		(substituted on) 67'
WG	23	Lucas González Amorosino		(substituted on) 63'
Coach:
(Argentina) Daniel Hourcade

FB	15	Maxime Médard
RW	14	Hugo Bonneval
OC	13	Gaël Fickou
IC	12	Rémi Lamerat
LW	11	Djibril Camara	(substituted off) 35'
FH	10	François Trinh-Duc	(substituted off) 72'
SH	9	Baptiste Serin	(substituted off) 63'
N8	8	Louis Picamoles
OF	7	Kevin Gourdon	(substituted off) 69'
BF	6	Loann Goujon
RL	5	Yoann Maestri (c)
LL	4	Julien Le Devedec	65' to 75'
TP	3	Uini Atonio	(substituted off) 56'
HK	2	Rémi Bonfils	(substituted off) 65'
LP	1	Jefferson Poirot	(substituted off) 69'
Replacements:
HK	16	Clément Maynadier	(substituted on) 65'
PR	17	Lucas Pointud	(substituted on) 69'
PR	18	Rabah Slimani	(substituted on) 56'
LK	19	Paul Jedrasiak	(substituted on) 65'
FL	20	Kélian Galletier	(substituted on) 69'	(substituted off) 75'
SH	21	Sébastien Bezy	(substituted on) 63'
FH	22	Jules Plisson	(substituted on) 72'
CE	23	Julien Rey	(substituted on) 35'
Coach:
(France) Guy Novès

Touch judges:

John Lacey (Ireland)
Luke Pearce (England)
Television match official:

Johan Greeff (South Africa)

Notes:
- Enrique Pieretto (Argentina) and Kélian Galletier (France) made their international debuts.
- Lucas González Amorosino (Argentina) earned his 50th test cap.
- Xavier Mignot was named to start, but was replaced with Hugo Bonneval before kick-off due to injury.
- This is the first time Argentina has failed to score any points in a test match since they lost 16–0 against Ireland in 2007. It is the first time they have failed to score any points against France since their first ever meeting in 1949.

== Argentina warm-up match ==
On 11 June, Argentina played host to Italy in the lead up to the French series.

11 June 2016
15:45 ART (UTC-03)

Argentina	30–24	Italy
Try: Montero 25' m Moroni 60' c Con: Sánchez (1/2) 61'; Pen: Sánchez (6/7) 9', 20', 31', 36', 58', 65'	Report	Try: Sarto 34' c Favaro 68' m Con: Canna (1/1) 35'; Pen: Canna (4/5) 15', 28', 39', 42'

Estadio B.G Estanislao López, Santa Fe
Attendance: 30,000
Referee: Stuart Berry (South Africa)

Team details

Argentina

Italy

FB	15	Joaquín Tuculet
RW	14	Santiago Cordero		(substituted off) 73'
OC	13	Matías Moroni
IC	12	Juan Martín Hernández		(substituted off) 59'
LW	11	Manuel Montero
FH	10	Nicolás Sánchez
SH	9	Martín Landajo		(substituted off) 59'
N8	8	Facundo Isa
OF	7	Tomás Lezana		(substituted off) 65'
BF	6	Pablo Matera
RL	5	Matías Alemanno		(substituted off) 58'
LL	4	Guido Petti	(yellow card) 28' to 38'
TP	3	Nahuel Tetaz Chaparro
HK	2	Agustín Creevy (c)		(substituted off) 65'
LP	1	Santiago García Botta
Replacements:
HK	16	Julián Montoya		(substituted on) 65'
PR	17	Felipe Arregui
PR	18	Enrique Pieretto
FL	19	Javier Ortega Desio		(substituted on) 58'
FL	20	Juan Manuel Leguizamón		(substituted on) 65'
SH	21	Tomás Cubelli		(substituted on) 59'
CE	22	Jerónimo de la Fuente		(substituted on) 59'
FB	23	Ramiro Moyano		(substituted on) 73'
Coach:
(Argentina) Daniel Hourcade

FB	15	Luke McLean
RW	14	Leonardo Sarto
OC	13	Michele Campagnaro
IC	12	Tommaso Boni
LW	11	David Odiete	(substituted off) 62'
FH	10	Carlo Canna	(substituted off) 69'
SH	9	Edoardo Gori (c)
N8	8	Dries van Schalkwyk
OF	7	Simone Favaro
BF	6	Braam Steyn	(substituted off) 9'
RL	5	Marco Fuser
LL	4	Quintin Geldenhuys	(substituted off) 51'
TP	3	Lorenzo Cittadini	(substituted off) 55'
HK	2	Ornel Gega	(substituted off) 62'
LP	1	Andrea Lovotti	(substituted off) 57'
Replacements:
HK	16	Oliviero Fabiani	(substituted on) 62'
PR	17	Sami Panico	(substituted on) 57'
PR	18	Pietro Ceccarelli	(substituted on) 55'
LK	19	Valerio Bernabò	(substituted on) 51'
FL	20	Robert Barbieri	(substituted on) 9'
SH	21	Guglielmo Palazzani
FH	22	Tommaso Allan	(substituted on) 69'
WG	23	Giovanbattista Venditti	(substituted on) 62'
Coach:
(Ireland) Conor O'Shea

Touch judges:
Luke Pearce (England)
Joaquín Montes (Uruguay)
Television match official:
Johan Greeff (South Africa)

Notes:

- Tommaso Boni and Sami Panico (both Italy) made their international debuts.

== Statistics ==
Key

- Con: Conversions
- Pen: Penalties
- DG: Drop goals
- Pts: Points

=== France statistics ===
Name	Played	Tries	Con	Pen	DG	Pts	Temporarily suspended	Sent off (straight red)
Jules Plisson	2	0	1	4	0	14	–	–
Baptiste Serin	2	0	3	2	0	12	–	–
Rémi Bonfils	2	1	0	0	0	5	–	–
Hugo Bonneval	2	1	0	0	0	5	–	–
Loann Goujon	2	1	0	0	0	5	–	–
Uini Atonio	2	0	0	0	0	0	–	–
Sébastien Bezy	2	0	0	0	0	0	–	–
Djibril Camara	2	0	0	0	0	0	–	–
Gaël Fickou	2	0	0	0	0	0	–	–
Kevin Gourdon	2	0	0	0	0	0	–	–
Julien Le Devedec	2	0	0	0	0	0	–	–
Clément Maynadier	2	0	0	0	0	0	–	–
Louis Picamoles	2	0	0	0	0	0	–	–
Lucas Pointud	2	0	0	0	0	0	–	–
Jefferson Poirot	2	0	0	0	0	0	–	–
Julien Rey	2	0	0	0	0	0	–	–
Rabah Slimani	2	0	0	0	0	0	–	–
François Trinh-Duc	2	0	0	0	0	0	–	–
Jonathan Danty	1	0	0	0	0	0	–	–
William Demotte	1	0	0	0	0	0	–	–
Raphaël Lakafia	1	0	0	0	0	0	–	–
Kélian Galletier	1	0	0	0	0	0	–	–
Paul Jedrasiak	1	0	0	0	0	0	–	–
Rémi Lamerat	1	0	0	0	0	0	–	–
Yoann Maestri	1	0	0	0	0	0	–	–
Maxime Médard	1	0	0	0	0	0	–	–
Fabrice Metz	1	0	0	0	0	0	–	–
Xavier Mignot	1	0	0	0	0	0	–	–
Geoffrey Palis	–	–	–	–	–	0	–	–

=== Test series statistics ===
Name	Team	Tries	Con	Pen	DG	Pts
Nicolás Sánchez	Argentina	0	3	3	0	15
Jules Plisson	France	0	1	4	0	14
Baptiste Serin	France	0	3	2	0	12
Rémi Bonfils	France	1	0	0	0	5
Hugo Bonneval	France	1	0	0	0	5
Loann Goujon	France	1	0	0	0	5
Rémi Lamerat	France	1	0	0	0	5
Manuel Montero	Argentina	1	0	0	0	5
Guido Petti	Argentina	1	0	0	0	5
Joaquín Tuculet	Argentina	1	0	0	0	5

== See also ==
- 2016 mid-year rugby union internationals
- History of rugby union matches between Argentina and France
