= List of 2019–20 Top 14 transfers =

This is a list of player transfers involving Top 14 teams before or during the 2019–20 season. The list is of deals that are confirmed and are either from or to a rugby union team in the Top 14 during the 2018–19 season. It is not unknown for confirmed deals to be cancelled at a later date. Bayonne and Brive are promoted to the Top 14, whilst Grenoble and Perpignan are demoted to the Pro D2 for the 2019–20 season.

== Agen ==
=== Players in ===
- (France) Malino Vanai from (France) Montauban
- (France) Walter Desmaison from (France) Mont-de-Marsan
- (England) Laurence Pearce from (France) Mont-de-Marsan
- (France) Xavier Chauveau from (France) Racing 92
- (France) Raphaël Lagarde from (France) Racing 92
- (New Zealand) Dylan Hayes from (France) Angoulême
- (France) Clement Martinez from (France) Biarritz
- (Samoa) Jamie-Jerry Taulagi from (France) Mont-de-Marsan
- (England) Pierce Phillips from (England) Worcester Warriors
- (France) Julien Jane from (France) Bayonne
- (France) Nathan Decron from (France) Bordeaux
- (Samoa) Jordan Puletua from (France) Beziers
- (Argentina) Joel Sclavi from (France) Angoulême short-term contract
- (Georgia (country)) Anton Peikrishvili from (Georgia (country)) Aia Kutaishi (short-term loan)

=== Players out ===
- (France) Antoine Miquel to (France) Toulouse
- (France) Quentin Bethune to (France) Stade Français Paris
- (Argentina) Facundo Bosch to (France) La Rochelle
- (France) Clement Laporte to (France) Lyon
- (France) Denis Marchois to (France) Pau
- (France) Julien Hériteau to (France) Toulon
- (Australia) Jake McIntyre to (France) Clermont
- (France) Fouad Yaha to (France) Catalans Dragons
- (France) Yohan Montes to (France) Provence
- (Spain) Xerom Civil to (France) Carcassonne
- (France) Yoan Tanga-Mangene to (France) Racing 92 (short-term deal)
- (Georgia (country)) Tamaz Mchedlidze to (France) Rouen
- (South Africa) Christaan van der Merwe to (France) Carcassonne
- (Tonga) Opeti Fonua to (France) Layrac
- (South Africa) Ricky Januarie to (France) Chateauroux
- (France) Nicolas Metge to (France) Narbonne
- (Argentina) Joel Sclavi to (Argentina) Jaguares

== Bayonne ==
=== Players in ===
- (South Africa) Hansie Graaff from (France) Massy
- (Samoa) Alofa Alofa from (England) Harlequins
- (Romania) Andres Gorin from (France) Massy
- (France) Brandon Fajardo from (France) Colomiers
- (Belgium) Jean-Baptiste de Clercq from (France) Oloron
- (France) Jean Monribot from (France) Toulon
- (Tonga) Edwin Maka from (France) Racing 92
- (Argentina) Mariano Galarza from (France) Bordeaux
- (Samoa) Viliamu Afatia from (France) Bordeaux
- (Samoa) Census Johnston from (France) Racing 92
- (Samoa) Mat Luamanu from (England) Harlequins
- (New Zealand) Malietoa Hingano from (France) Stade Français Paris
- (France) Djibril Camara from (France) Stade Français Paris
- (New Zealand) Michael Ruru from (Australia) Melbourne Rebels
- (England) Callum Wilson from (France) Angoulême

=== Players out ===
- (South Africa) Bandisa Ndlovu to (South Africa) Sharks
- (Argentina) Juan Pablo Orlandi retired
- (South Africa) Tristian Tedder to (France) Toulouse
- (France) Julien Jane to (France) Agen
- (France) Alexandre Gouaux to (France) Aurillac
- (South Africa) Kyle Whyte to (England) London Scottish
- (France) Benjamin Thiery retired
- (France) Gregory Arganese retired
- (France) Maxime Marty to (France) Toulouse
- (Spain) Bastien Fuster to (France) Rouen
- (South Africa) Willie du Plessis to (France) Biarritz

== Bordeaux ==
=== Players in ===
- (France) Remi Lamerat from (France) Clermont
- (New Zealand) Ben Botica from (France) Oyonnax
- (France) Yoram Moefana from (France) Colomiers
- (France) Maxime Lucu from (France) Biarritz
- (Argentina) Santiago Cordero from (England) Exeter Chiefs
- (Australia) Scott Higginbotham from (Australia) Queensland Reds
- (France) Alexandre Flanquart from (France) Stade Français Paris
- (Samoa) Masalosalo Tutaia from (France) Perpignan (short-term loan)

=== Players out ===
- (Australia) Luke Jones to (Australia) Melbourne Rebels
- (France) Baptiste Serin to (France) Toulon
- (Georgia (country)) Irakli Tskhadadze to (France) Brive
- (France) Romain Lonca to (France) Biarritz
- (Australia) Leroy Houston to (France) Biarritz
- (United States) Greg Peterson to (England) Newcastle Falcons
- (Argentina) Mariano Galarza to (France) Bayonne
- (France) Nathan Decron to (France) Agen
- (New Zealand) George Tilsley to (France) Perpignan
- (France) Lucas Lebraud to (France) Biarritz
- (Samoa) Viliamu Afatia to (France) Bayonne
- (Australia) Brock James to (France) La Rochelle

== Brive ==
=== Players in ===
- (Fiji) Mesake Doge from (Romania) Timișoara Saracens
- (Fiji) Kitione Kamikamica from (France) Vannes
- (England) Hayden Thompson-Stringer from (England) Saracens
- (Fiji) Setareki Bituniyata from (France) Massy
- (Georgia (country)) Vano Karkadze from (France) Aurillac
- (France) Julien Blanc from (France) Pau
- (France) Quentin Delord from (France) Lyon
- (Scotland) Alex Dunbar from (Scotland) Glasgow Warriors
- (Australia) Mitch Lees from (England) Exeter Chiefs
- (South Africa) Nico Lee from (South Africa) Cheetahs

=== Players out ===
- (South Africa) Petrus Hauman retired
- (France) Demba Bamba to (France) Lyon
- (France) Vivien Devisme to (France) Lyon
- (Georgia (country)) Luka Goginava to (France) Angoulême
- (France) Felix Le Bourhis to (France) Carcassonne
- (Fiji) Dominiko Waqaniburotu to (France) Pau
- (Portugal) Samuel Marques to (France) Pau
- (France) Ken Bikadua to (France) Surenes
- (France) Damien Lagrange to (France) Provence
- (France) Loick Jammes to (France) Provence
- (France) Benjamin Petre to (France) Albi
- (Fiji) Peceli Nacebe to (Fiji) Fijian Drua
- (France) Arnaud Mignardi released

== Castres ==
=== Players in ===
- (France) Hans N'Kinsi from (France) Grenoble
- (France) Thomas Fortunel from (France) Montauban
- (Fiji) Filipo Nakosi from (France) Toulon
- (France) Bastien Bourgier from (France) Toulouse
- (New Zealand) Karena Wihongi from (France) Carcassonne
- (Canada) Matt Tierney from (France) Pau
- (France) Benjamin Lapeyre from (France) Beziers (short-term loan)

=== Players out ===
- (France) Thibault Lassalle to (France) Oyonnax
- (France) Yannick Caballero retired
- (France) Yohan Le Bourhis to (France) Oyonnax
- (France) Scott Spedding retired
- (France) Yohan Domenech to (France) Rouen
- (New Zealand) David Smith to (France) Narbonne
- (Tonga) Steve Mafi to (England) London Irish

== Clermont ==
=== Players in ===
- (England) George Merrick from (England) Harlequins
- (Australia) Jake McIntyre from (France) Agen
- (Portugal) Mike Tadjer from (France) Grenoble
- (South Africa) Rudy Paige from (South Africa) Cheetahs (short-term loan)
- (South Africa) JJ Engelbrecht from (South Africa) Stormers (short-term loan)
- (Samoa) Faifili Levave from (Japan) Mitusbishi DynaBoars (short-term loan)
- (Tonga) Duane Aholelei from (New Zealand) Tasman (short-term loan)

=== Players out ===
- (France) Remi Lamerat to (France) Bordeaux
- (France) Michaël Simutoga to (France) Grenoble
- (Argentina) Patricio Fernandez to (France) Lyon
- (France) Dorian Laverhne to (France) Provence
- (France) Damien Chouly to (France) Perpignan
- (South Africa) Flip van der Merwe retired
- (France) Corentin Astier to (France) Montauban
- (France) Benjamin Kayser retired
- (France) William Hutteau to (France) Vannes

== La Rochelle ==
=== Players in ===
- (France) Reda Wardi from (France) Beziers
- (Argentina) Facundo Bosch from (France) Agen
- (Australia) Brock James from (France) Bordeaux
- (New Zealand) Teddy Stanaway from (France) Oyonnax (short-term deal)

=== Players out ===
- (New Zealand) Hikairo Forbes to (France) Provence
- (France) William Demotte to (France) Grenoble
- (France) Steeve Barry to (France) Biarritz
- (France) Benjamin Noble to (France) Angoulême
- (France) Mohamed Boughanmi to (France) Pau
- (England) Ryan Lamb retired
- (Germany) Eric Marks to (France) Vannes

== Lyon ==
=== Players in ===
- (France) Demba Bamba from (France) Brive
- (France) Vivien Devisme from (France) Brive
- (Tonga) Tanginoa Halaifonua from (France) Massy
- (France) Clement Laporte from (France) Agen
- (France) Xavier Chiocci from (France) Toulon
- (France) Kilian Geraci from (France) Grenoble
- (Argentina) Patricio Fernandez from (France) Clermont
- (Georgia (country)) Badri Alkhazashvili from (France) Provence
- (Fiji) Josua Tuisova from (France) Toulon

=== Players out ===
- (France) Lionel Beauxis to (France) Oyonnax
- (Argentina) Manuel Carizza retired
- (England) Delon Armitage retired
- (South Africa) Deon Fourie to (France) Grenoble
- (France) Virgile Lacombe retired
- (South Africa) Albertus Buckle retired
- (France) Adrien Seguret to (France) Mont-de-Marsan
- (France) Quentin Delord to (France) Brive

== Montpellier ==
=== Players in ===
- (France) Guilhem Guirado from (France) Toulon
- (France) Anthony Bouthier from (France) Vannes
- (South Africa) Handre Pollard from (South Africa) Bulls
- (Samoa) Kahn Fotuali'i from (England) Bath
- (Australia) Caleb Timu from (Australia) Queensland Reds
- (France) Lucas de Connick from (France) Biarritz
- (South Africa) Lizo Gqoboka from (South Africa) Bulls (short-term loan)

=== Players out ===
- (France) Yvan Watremez to (France) Biarritz
- (France) Romain Ruffenach to (France) Biarritz
- (France) Alexandre Dumoulin to (France) Pau
- (France) Julien Tomas retired
- (France) Yannick Arrboyo to (France) Beziers
- (Australia) Chris Kuridrani to Kagifa Samoa
- (South Africa) Ruan Pienaar to (South Africa) Cheetahs

== Pau ==
=== Players in ===
- (France) Denis Marchois from (France) Agen
- (France) Alexandre Dumoulin from (France) Montpellier
- (New Zealand) Ben Smith from (New Zealand) Highlanders
- (Tonga) Siegfried Fisi'ihoi from (France) Stade Français Paris
- (New Zealand) Luke Whitelock from (New Zealand) Highlanders
- (France) Lucas Pointud from (France) Toulouse
- (Fiji) Dominiko Waqaniburotu from (France) Brive
- (Portugal) Samuel Marques from (France) Brive
- (France) Mohamed Boughanmi from (France) La Rochelle

=== Players out ===
- (France) Thomas Domingo retired
- (France) Julien Blanc to (France) Brive
- (Ireland) Sean Dougall to (France) Valence Romans
- (Canada) Matt Tierney to (France) Castres
- (New Zealand) Peter Saili to (France) Valence Romans
- (France) Laurent Bouchet to (France) Grenoble
- (England) Steffon Armitage to (United States) San Diego Legion

== Racing 92 ==
=== Players in ===
- (France) Ali Oz from (France) Grenoble
- (France) Kevin Le Guen from (France) Angoulême
- (France) Dorian Laborde from (France) Mont-de-Marsan
- (France) François Trinh-Duc from (France) Toulon
- (France) Yoan Tanga-Mangene from (France) Agen (short-term loan)
- (France) Theo Velten from (France) Angoulême
- (Scotland) Sam Hidalgo-Clyne from (Wales) Scarlets (short-term deal)
- (Argentina) Joaquín Díaz Bonilla from (Argentina) Jaguares (short-term loan)

=== Players out ===
- (France) Xavier Chauveau to (France) Agen
- (France) Raphaël Lagarde to (France) Agen
- (South Africa) Pat Lambie retired
- (Samoa) Ole Avei to (France) Angoulême
- (Tonga) Edwin Maka to (France) Bayonne
- (France) Dimitri Szarzewski retired
- (Samoa) Census Johnston to (France) Bayonne
- (New Zealand) Joe Rokocoko retired

== Stade Français ==
=== Players in ===
- (France) Christopher Vaotoa from (France) Montauban
- (France) Quentin Bethune from (France) Agen
- (Argentina) Pablo Matera from (Argentina) Jaguares
- (France) Pierre-Henri Azagoh from (France) Massy
- (France) Sami Mavinga from (England) Newcastle Falcons
- (South Africa) James Hall from (France) Oyonnax
- (Australia) Sefa Naivalu from (Australia) Queensland Reds
- (Spain) Thierry Feuteu from (Spain) Alcobendas Rugby
- (France) Fabien Witz from (France) Massy
- (France) Joris Segonds from (France) Aurllac
- (France) Loic Godener from (France) Grenoble
- (Canada) Quentin James from (France) Perpignan
- (South Africa) Ruan Combrinck from (South Africa) Lions
- (South Africa) Lionel Mapoe from (South Africa) Lions (short-term loan)
- (Australia) Tolu Latu from (Australia) NSW Waratahs
- (Australia) Damien Fitzpatrick from (Australia) Waratahs (short-term loan)
- (South Africa) Carlü Sadie from (South Africa) Western Province (short-term loan)
- (Fiji) Joketani Koroi from (New Zealand) Otago
- (Fiji) Luke Tagi from (Fiji) Fijian Drua (short-term loan)

=== Players out ===
- (Tonga) Siegfried Fisi'ihoi to (France) Pau
- (South Africa) Piet van Zyl retired
- (France) Alexandre Flanquart to (France) Bordeaux
- (New Zealand) Tony Ensor to (France) Oyonnax
- (South Africa) Morné Steyn to (South Africa) Bulls
- (France) Laurent Sempere retired
- (France) Sylvain Nicolas retired
- (New Zealand) Malietoa Hingano to (France) Bayonne
- (France) Djibril Camara to (France) Bayonne
- (Italy) Sergio Parisse to (France) Toulon
- (Ireland) Denis Coulson to (France) Carcassonne
- (France) Elies El Ansari to (France) Massy
- (France) Jimmy Yobo to (France) Aurillac

== Toulon ==
=== Players in ===
- (France) Christopher Tolofua from (England) Saracens
- (France) Baptiste Serin from (France) Bordeaux
- (South Africa) Eben Etzebeth from (South Africa) Stormers
- (New Zealand) Nehe Milner-Skudder from (New Zealand) Hurricanes
- (Australia) Duncan Paia'aua from (Australia) Queensland Reds
- (France) Julien Hériteau from (France) Agen
- (New Zealand) Bryce Heem from (England) Worcester Warriors
- (France) Thomas Hoarau from (France) Beziers
- (France) Theo Dachary from (France) Biarritz
- (Fiji) Masivesi Dakuwaqa from (Australia) Western Force
- (France) Gabin Villiere from (France) Rouen
- (France) Gervais Cordin from (France) Grenoble
- (Georgia (country)) Beka Gigashvili from (France) Grenoble
- (Italy) Sergio Parisse from (France) Stade Français Paris
- (England) Ben Te'o from (England) Worcester Warriors (short-term deal)
- (South Africa) Wilco Louw from (South Africa) Stormers (short-term loan)
- (South Africa) Louis Schreuder from (South Africa) Sharks
- (Tonga) Sonatane Takulua from (England) Newcastle Falcons
- (Argentina) Ramiro Moyano from (Argentina) Jaguares

=== Players out ===
- (France) Guilhem Guirado to (France) Montpellier
- (France) Xavier Chiocci to (France) Lyon
- (France) Eric Escande to (France) Grenoble
- (New Zealand) Malakai Fekitoa to (England) Wasps
- (France) François Trinh-Duc to (France) Racing 92
- (France) Jean Monribot to (France) Bayonne
- (Fiji) Josua Tuisova to (France) Lyon
- (Fiji) Filipo Nakosi to (France) Castres
- (France) Mathieu Bastareaud to (United States) Rugby United New York
- (France) Darly Domvo to (France) Biarritz
- (South Africa) JP Pietersen to (South Africa) Sharks
- (France) Rudy Gahetau to (France) Rouen
- (Australia) Jonah Placid to (Australia) Western Force
- (South Africa) Juandré Kruger to (South Africa) Bulls

== Toulouse ==
=== Players in ===
- (South Africa) Tristian Tedder from (France) Bayonne
- (France) Bastien Chalureau from (France) Nevers
- (Australia) Rory Arnold from (Australia) Brumbies
- (France) Maxime Marty from (France) Bayonne
- Werner Kok from South Africa Sevens (short-term loan)
- (Japan) Takeshi Hino from (Japan) Yamaha Jubilo (short-term loan)
- (South Africa) Jaco Visagie from (South Africa) Bulls (short-term loan)

=== Players out ===
- (France) Pierre Gayraud to (France) Grenoble
- (Samoa) Piula Fa'asalele to (France) Perpignan
- (France) Lucas Pointud to (France) Pau
- (France) Alexandre Manukula to (France) Colomiers
- (France) Bastien Bourgier to (France) Castres
- (South Africa) Maks van Dyk to (England) Harlequins

== See also ==
- List of 2019–20 Premiership Rugby transfers
- List of 2019–20 Pro14 transfers
- List of 2019–20 Super Rugby transfers
- List of 2019–20 RFU Championship transfers
- List of 2019–20 Major League Rugby transfers
