= 1984–85 French Rugby Union Championship =

French Rugby Championship 1984–85
- Countries: France
- Number of teams: 40 teams
- Champions: Toulouse
- Runners-up: Toulon

The 1984–85 French Rugby Union Championship was won by Toulouse that beat Toulon in the final.

== Formula ==
The 40 clubs were divided in four pools of ten.

The two best team in each pool were admitted directly into "last 16", while the teams classified from 3rd to 6th played a barrage.

== Qualification round ==
The teams are listed as the ranking, in bold the teams admitted directly to "last 16" round.

**Pool 1**

- **Toulouse**
- **Béziers**
- Montauban
- Stadoceste
- Tyrosse
- Aurillac
- Narbonne
- Carcassonne
- Racing
- Avenir Aturin

**Pool 3**

- **Lourdes**
- **Montferrand**
- Brive
- Bayonne
- Grenoble
- La Voulte
- Pau
- Club olympique Creusotin
- Stade Bagnérais
- Angoulême

**Pool 2**

- **Agen**
- **Biarritz**
- Dax
- Hyères
- Oloron
- Boucau
- Bègles-Bordeaux
- Romans
- Valence
- La Rochelle

**Pool 4**

- **RRC Nice**
- **Toulon**
- Graulhet
- Perpignan
- Bourgoin-Jallieu
- Mont-de-Marsan
- Castres
- Nîmes
- Tulle
- Albi

== Knockout stages ==
=== Barrage ===
In bold the clubs qualified for the next round

Team 1	Team 2	Results
**Bayonne**	Oloron	15-10
Graulhet	**Mont-de-Marsan**	12-18
**Brive**	Boucau	17-9
**Grenoble**	Perpignan	22-13
**Aurillac**	Montauban	21-17
**Bourgoin-Jallieu**	Stadoceste	19-9
**Tyrosse**	Dax	3-0
**La Voulte**	Hyères	14-9

=== "Last 16" ===
In bold the clubs qualified for the next round

Team 1	Team 2	1st match	2nd match
Toulouse	Bayonne	15-9	10-3
Béziers	Mont-de-Marsan	35-19	9-6
Montferrand	Brive	23-6	28-31
Agen	Grenoble	27-16	9-9
Toulon	Aurillac	21-6	32-15
RRC Nice	Bourgoin-Jallieu	6-9	28-15
Lourdes	Tyrosse	6-12	22-6
Biarritz	La Voulte	3-10	29-12

=== Quarter of finals ===
In bold the clubs qualified for the next round

Team 1	Team 2	Results
**Toulouse**	Béziers	**21-0**
**Montferrand**	Agen	**13-12**
**Toulon**	RRC Nice	**19-9**
**Lourdes**	Biarritz	**13-9**

=== Semifinals ===
Team 1	Team 2	Results
**Toulouse**	Montferrand	**17-6**
**Toulon**	Lourdes	**6-3**

== Final ==
Teams	**Toulouse** - Toulon
Score	**36-22** after over-time ( 19-19 ath the end of regular time)
Date	25 May 1985
Venue	Parc des Princes
Referee	Yves Bressy
Line-up
Toulouse	Christian Breseghello, Daniel Santamans, Claude Portolan, Gérard Portolan (Jean-Michel Giraud 46), Jean-Marie Cadieu (Karl Janik 71), Thierry Maset, Karl Janik (Hervé Lecomte 71), Albert Cigagna, Michel Lopez, Philippe Rougé-Thomas, Guy Novès, Denis Charvet, Éric Bonneval, Jean-Michel Rancoule, Serge Gabernet; Other replacement : Serge Laïrle, Thierry Grolleau, Thierry Merlos, Laurent Husson.
Toulon	Manu Diaz, Bernard Herrero, Yann Braendlin, Patrick Occhini, Marc Pujolle, Éric Champ, Gilbert Doucet, Philippe Coulais, Jérôme Gallion, Christian Cauvy (Christian Salvarelli 64), Thierry Fournier, Alain Carbonel, Patrice Blachères (Christian Cauvy 64), Pascal Jehl, Jérôme Bianchi (Gilles Fargues 45); Other replacement : Laurent Gueit, Yvan Roux, Bernard Capitani, Jean-Luc Charlier.
Scorers
Toulouse	6 tries Bonneval (51, 83), Charvet (54, 70, 109) and C. Portolan (94), 3 conversions Lopez (54, 70, 109) and 2 penalties Lopez (38, 86)
Toulon	2 tries Fournier (24) and Gallion (67), 1 conversion Bianchi (24) and 3 penalties Bianchi (15, 36), Cauvy (100) and 1 drop Cauvy (64)

It was the first Bouclier de Brennus won by Toulouse from 1947,
