= 1988–89 French Rugby Union Championship =

French Rugby Championship 1988–89
- Countries: France
- Number of teams: 80 teams
- Champions: Toulouse (10th title)
- Runners-up: Toulon

The 1988–89 French Rugby Union Championship was won by Toulouse that beat Toulon in the final.

Toulouse won his 10th bouclier de Brennus, the third in the 80's.

== Formula ==
- The tournament was played by 80 clubs divided in sixteen pools of five. .
- The two better of each pool (a sum of 32 clubs) were admitted to the group A to play for the title
- In the second round the 32 clubs of group A were divided in four pools of eight.
- The four better of each pool of group A (16 clubs) were qualified to play the knockout stage

== Group A Qualification to knockout stage ==
The teams are listed as the ranking, in bold the teams admitted to "last 16" round.

**Pool 1**

- **Toulouse**
- **Dax**
- **Montferrand**
- **Agen**
- Bourgoin-Jallieu
- Cognac
- Montchanin
- Villeneuve-sur-Lot

**Pool 3**

- **Touloun**
- **Bayonne**
- **Brive**
- **Graulhet**
- Aurillac
- Mont-de-Marsan
- US Colomiers
- Bergerac

**Pool 2**

- **Stadoceste**
- **Blagnac SCR**
- **Lourdes**
- **Bègles-Bordeaux**
- Le Creusot
- Stade Bagnérais
- Perpignan
- Nîmes

**Pool 4**

- **Grenoble**
- **Béziers**
- **Narbonne**
- **Racing**
- Hagetmau
- Villefranche de Lauragais
- RRC Nice
- Boucau Tarnos

=== "Last 16" ===
In bold the clubs qualified for the quarter of finals.

Team 1	Team 2	1st match	2nd match
**Agen**	Dax	15-15	41-15
Racing	**Tarbes**	16-15	0-22
Bègles-Bordeaux	**Toulouse**	3-47	15-27
**Lourdes**	Blagnac SCR	6-10	24-9
Graulhet	**Grenoble**	3-36	9-15
**Narbonne**	Bayonne	39-9	24-18
Montferrand	**Touloun**	21-17	9-29
Brive	**Béziers**	12-22	6-32

=== Quarter of finals ===
In bold the clubs qualified for the next round

**Team 1**	**Team 2**	**Results**
**Agen**	Tarbes	**12-9**
**Toulouse**	Lourdes	**41-15**
Grenoble	**Narbonne**	**13-24**
**Toulon**	Béziers	**19-12**

=== Semifinals ===
Team 1	Team 2	Results
Agen	**Toulouse**	**9-18**
Narbonne	**Toulon**	**3-20**

== Final ==
Teams	Toulouse - Toulon
Score	18-12 (15-9)
Date	27 May 1989
Venue	Parc des Princes, Paris
Referee	Guy Maurette
Line-up
Toulouse	Serge Laïrle (Gérard Portolan 73), Patrick Soula, Claude Portolan, Hugues Miorin, Jean-Marie Cadieu, Thierry Maset (Hervé Lecomte 69), Karl Janik, Albert Cigagna, Jérôme Cazalbou, Philippe Rougé-Thomas, David Berty, Denis Charvet, Didier Codorniou, Jean-Michel Rancoule, Joël Dupuy; Not on the ground : Michel Lopez, Éric Bonneval, Thierry Savio, Bruno Coumes
Toulon	Manu Diaz, Jean-Michel Casalini (Jean-Louis Raibaut 77), Yann Braendlin, Yvan Roux, Jean-Charles Orso (Jean-Pierre Alarcon 80), Éric Champ, Jean-François Tordo, Eric Melville, Jérôme Gallion, Christian Cauvy, Pascal Jehl, Alain Carbonel, Pierre Trémouille, Éric Fourniols, Jérôme Bianchi; Not on the ground : Thierry Louvet, Philippe Sauton, Thierry Ruet, Frédéric Saint-Sardos
Scorers
Toulouse	2 tries Laîrle (1) and Charvet (31), 2 conversions de Dupuy and 1 drop Charvet (11), 1 drop Dupuy (70)
Touloun	3 penalties Bianchi (15,21,58), 1 drop Cauvy (6)
