= 1985–86 French Rugby Union Championship =

French Rugby Championship 1985–86
- Countries: France
- Number of teams: 40 teams
- Champions: Toulouse
- Runners-up: Agen

The 1985–86 French Rugby Union Championship was won by Toulouse that beat Agen in the final.

== Formula ==
The 40 clubs were divided in 4 pools of ten.

The best two teams of each pool were admitted directly to the "last 16", while the teams classified from 3rd to 6th played a barrage

== Qualification round ==
The teams are listed as the ranking, in bold the teams admitted directly to "last 16" round.

=== Pool 1 ===
- **Toulouse**
- **Narbonne**
- Béziers
- Brive
- Graulhet
- Romans
- Mont-de-Marsan
- Boucau
- Stade Bagnérais
- Lombez-Samatan

=== Pool 3 ===
- **Agen**
- **Nîmes**
- Aurillac
- Lourdes
- Hagetmau
- Le Creusot
- Dax
- Tyrosse
- Tulle
- Montauban

=== Pool 2 ===
- **Touloun**
- **Biarritz**
- Valence
- Pau
- Bayonne
- Oloron
- Hyères
- La Voulte
- Castres
- Lavelanet

=== Pool 4 ===
- **Perpignan**
- **Montferrand**
- RRC Nice
- Racing
- Stadoceste
- Grenoble
- Bourgoin-Jallieu
- Bègles-Bordeaux
- Carcassonne
- Marmande

== Knockout stages ==
=== Barrage ===
In bold the clubs qualified for the next round

Team 1	Team 2	Results
Bayonne	Pau	6-3
Béziers	Hagetmau	10-6
Racing	Oloron	4-3
Brive	Le Creusot-Montchanin	30-6
Grenoble	Aurillac	9-6
Lourdes	Romans	16-10
RRC Nice	Stadoceste	15-14
Graulhet	Valence	15-4

=== "Last 16" ===
In bold the clubs qualified for the next round

Team 1	Team 2	1st match	2nd match
Bayonne	**Agen**	12-6	6-31
**Béziers**	Nîmes	9-3	17-12
Racing	**Perpignan**	20-16	3-13
Brive	**Touloun**	12-0	3-43
Grenoble	**Biarritz**	9-0	9-19
Lourdes	**Toulouse**	9-20	3-35
RRC Nice	**Montferrand**	9-6	3-6
**Graulhet**	Narbonne	15-12	9-10

=== Quarter of finals ===
In bold the clubs qualified for the next round

Team 1	Team 2	Results
**Agen**	Béziers	**16-12**
Perpignan	**Touloun**	**10-15**
Biarritz	**Toulouse**	**3-16**
Montferrand	**Graulhet**	**12-15**

=== Semifinals ===
Team 1	Team 2	Results
**Agen**	Toulon	**38-18**
**Toulouse**	Graulhet	**21-12**

== Final ==
Teams	**Toulouse** - Agen
Score	**16-06** (6-3)
Date	24 May 1986
Venue	Parc des Princes, Paris
Referee	André Peytavin
Line-up
Toulouse	Gérard Portolan (Serge Laïrle 66), Serge Laïrle (Daniel Santamans 66), Claude Portolan, Jean-Michel Giraud, Jean-Marie Cadieu, Thierry Maset, Karl Janik, Albert Cigagna (Hervé Lecomte 66), Michel Lopez, Philippe Rougé-Thomas, Guy Novès, Denis Charvet, Éric Bonneval, Jean-Michel Rancoule, Serge Gabernet; Other replacement : Thierry Palisson, Laurent Husson
Agen	Jean-Louis Tolot, Jean-Louis Dupont, Daniel Dubroca (Patrice Boué 23), Patrick Pujade, Bernard Mazzer, Jacques Gratton, Bernard Delbreil, Dominique Erbani, Pierre Berbizier, Christian Delage, Éric Gleyze, Philippe Mothe, Philippe Sella, Bernard Lacombe, Philippe Bérot; Other replacement : Jean-Yves Belléard
Scorers
Toulouse	1 try Bonneval (80), 4 penalties Gabernet (14), Lopez (36, 41, 70)
Agen	2 penalties Bérot (23, 51)
