= 2017 France rugby union tour of South Africa =

- Coach: Guy Novès
Opponent
P	W	D	L
South Africa
3	0	0	3

Tour chronology
- ← Argentina 2016 New Zealand 2018 →

In June 2017, France played a three-test series against South Africa as part of the 2017 mid-year rugby union tests. They played the Springboks over the three-week June International window (5 June–25 June), and the matches were part of the fifth year of the global rugby calendar established by the World Rugby, which runs through to 2019. This was France' first visit to South Africa since 2010 and the first test series between the teams since 2005. The last time the sides met was during the 2013 end-of-year international, where South Africa won 19–10 in Paris.

== Fixtures ==
Date	Venue	Home	Score	Away
10 June 2017	Loftus Versfeld Stadium, Pretoria	South Africa	37–14	France
17 June 2017	Kings Park Stadium, Durban	South Africa	37–15	France
24 June 2017	Ellis Park Stadium, Johannesburg	South Africa	35–12	France

== Squads ==
Note: Ages, caps and clubs are as per 10 June 2017, the first test match of the tour.

=== France ===
On 27 May, France named a 35-man squad ahead of their three-test series against South Africa.

On 29 May, Nans Ducuing was called up to the squad as an injury replacement for Djibril Camara.

On 5 June, Paul Jedrasiak and François Trinh-Duc were called up to the squad as injury cover for Arthur Iturria and Camille Lopez.

Coaching team:

- Head coach: (France) Guy Novès
- Defence coach: (France) Gerald Bastide
- Backs coach: (France) Jean-Frederic Dubois
- Forwards coach: (France) Yannick Bru

Note: Flags indicate national union for the club/province as defined by World Rugby.

Player	Position	Date of birth (age)	Caps	Club/province
Camille Chat	Hooker	18 December 1995 (aged 21)	8	(France) Racing 92
Guilhem Guirado (c)	Hooker	17 June 1986 (aged 30)	51	(France) Toulon
Clément Maynadier	Hooker	11 October 1988 (aged 28)	3	(France) Bordeaux
Uini Atonio	Prop	26 March 1990 (aged 27)	25	(France) La Rochelle
Eddy Ben Arous	Prop	25 August 1990 (aged 26)	17	(France) Racing 92
Mohamed Boughanmi	Prop	27 October 1991 (aged 25)	0	(France) La Rochelle
Xavier Chiocci	Prop	13 February 1990 (aged 27)	9	(France) Toulon
Jefferson Poirot	Prop	1 November 1992 (aged 24)	8	(France) Bordeaux Bègles
Rabah Slimani	Prop	18 October 1989 (aged 27)	36	(France) Stade Français
Paul Jedrasiak	Lock	6 February 1993 (age 32)	6	(France) Clermont Auvergne
Julien Le Devedec	Lock	4 June 1986 (aged 31)	9	(France) Brive
Yoann Maestri	Lock	14 January 1988 (aged 29)	56	(France) Toulouse
Romain Taofifénua	Lock	14 September 1990 (aged 26)	8	(France) Toulon
Yacouba Camara	Flanker	2 June 1994 (aged 23)	3	(France) Toulouse
Loann Goujon	Flanker	23 April 1989 (aged 28)	15	(France) Bordeaux Bègles
Kevin Gourdon	Flanker	23 January 1990 (aged 27)	10	(France) La Rochelle
Anthony Jelonch	Flanker	28 July 1996 (aged 20)	0	(France) Castres Olympique
Bernard Le Roux	Flanker	4 June 1989 (aged 28)	26	(France) Racing 92
Louis Picamoles	Number 8	5 February 1986 (aged 31)	62	(England) Northampton Saints
Antoine Dupont	Scrum-half	15 November 1996 (aged 20)	2	(France) Castres Olympique
Maxime Machenaud	Scrum-half	30 December 1988 (aged 28)	29	(France) Racing 92
Baptiste Serin	Scrum-half	20 June 1994 (aged 22)	10	(France) Bordeaux Bègles
Jean-Marc Doussain	Fly-half	12 February 1991 (aged 26)	15	(France) Toulouse
Jules Plisson	Fly-half	20 August 1991 (aged 25)	13	(France) Stade Français
François Trinh-Duc	Fly-half	11 November 1986 (age 39)	58	(France) Toulon
Henry Chavancy	Centre	22 May 1988 (aged 29)	1	(France) Racing 92
Jonathan Danty	Centre	7 October 1992 (aged 24)	4	(France) Stade Français
Gaël Fickou	Centre	26 March 1994 (aged 23)	29	(France) Toulouse
Damian Penaud	Centre	25 September 1996 (aged 20)	0	(France) Clermont Auvergne
Nans Ducuing	Wing	6 November 1991 (aged 25)	0	(France) Bordeaux Bègles
Yoann Huget	Wing	2 June 1987 (aged 30)	47	(France) Toulouse
Vincent Rattez	Wing	24 March 1992 (aged 25)	0	(France) La Rochelle
Virimi Vakatawa	Wing	1 May 1992 (aged 25)	12	(France) FFR
Brice Dulin	Fullback	13 April 1990 (aged 27)	27	(France) Racing 92
Scott Spedding	Fullback	4 May 1986 (aged 31)	21	(France) Clermont Auvergne

=== South Africa ===
South Africa named a 31-man squad for South Africa's three-test series against France on 23 May 2017.

Coaching team:

- Head coach: (South Africa) Allister Coetzee
- Defence coach: (South Africa) Brendan Venter
- Backs coach: (South Africa) Franco Smith
- Forwards coach: (South Africa) Johann van Graan

Player	Position	Date of birth (age)	Caps	Club/province
Malcolm Marx	Hooker	13 July 1994 (aged 22)	2	(South Africa) Lions
Bongi Mbonambi	Hooker	7 January 1991 (aged 26)	5	(South Africa) Stormers
Chiliboy Ralepelle	Hooker	11 September 1986 (aged 30)	22	(South Africa) Sharks
Ruan Dreyer	Prop	16 September 1990 (aged 26)	0	(South Africa) Lions
Steven Kitshoff	Prop	10 February 1992 (aged 25)	10	(France) Bordeaux
Frans Malherbe	Prop	14 March 1991 (aged 26)	15	(South Africa) Stormers
Tendai Mtawarira	Prop	1 August 1985 (aged 31)	87	(South Africa) Sharks
Lizo Gqoboka	Prop	24 March 1990 (aged 27)	0	(South Africa) Bulls
Coenie Oosthuizen	Prop	22 March 1989 (aged 28)	23	(South Africa) Sharks
Lood de Jager	Lock	17 December 1992 (aged 24)	28	(South Africa) Bulls
Pieter-Steph du Toit	Lock	20 August 1992 (aged 24)	20	(South Africa) Stormers
Eben Etzebeth	Lock	29 October 1991 (aged 25)	54	(South Africa) Stormers
Franco Mostert	Lock	27 November 1990 (aged 26)	7	(South Africa) Lions / (Japan) Ricoh Black Rams
Siya Kolisi	Flanker	16 June 1991 (aged 25)	16	(South Africa) Stormers
Jaco Kriel	Flanker	21 August 1989 (aged 27)	7	(South Africa) Lions
Oupa Mohojé	Flanker	3 August 1990 (aged 26)	15	(South Africa) Cheetahs
Duane Vermeulen	Number 8	3 July 1986 (aged 30)	37	(France) Toulon
Warren Whiteley (c)	Number 8	18 September 1987 (aged 29)	15	(South Africa) Lions / (Japan) NTT DoCoMo Red Hurricanes
Ross Cronjé	Scrum-half	26 July 1989 (aged 27)	0	(South Africa) Lions
Francois Hougaard	Scrum-half	6 April 1988 (aged 29)	39	(England) Worcester Warriors
Rudy Paige	Scrum-half	2 August 1989 (aged 27)	7	(South Africa) Bulls
Elton Jantjies	Fly-half	1 August 1990 (aged 26)	11	(South Africa) Lions / (Japan) NTT Communications Shining Arcs
François Steyn	Fly-half	14 May 1987 (aged 30)	53	(France) Montpellier
Lukhanyo Am	Centre	28 November 1993 (aged 23)	0	(South Africa) Sharks
Damian de Allende	Centre	25 November 1991 (aged 25)	22	(South Africa) Stormers
Jesse Kriel	Centre	15 February 1994 (aged 23)	17	(South Africa) Bulls
Jan Serfontein	Centre	15 April 1993 (aged 24)	26	(South Africa) Bulls
Dillyn Leyds	Wing	12 September 1992 (aged 24)	0	(South Africa) Stormers
Raymond Rhule	Wing	6 November 1992 (aged 24)	0	(South Africa) Cheetahs
Courtnall Skosan	Wing	24 July 1991 (aged 25)	0	(South Africa) Lions
Andries Coetzee	Fullback	1 March 1990 (aged 27)	0	(South Africa) Lions

== Matches ==
=== First test ===
10 June 2017
17:00 SAST (UTC+02)

South Africa	37–14	France
Try: Kriel 30' c Penalty try 59'; Cronjé 60' c Serfontein 67' c Con: Jantjies (3/3) 32', 61', 68'; Pen: Jantjies (3/3) 10', 14', 39'	Report	Try: Chavancy 34' c Serin 54' c Con: Plisson (2/2) 36', 55'

Loftus Versfeld Stadium, Pretoria
Referee: Glen Jackson (New Zealand)

FB	15	Andries Coetzee
RW	14	Raymond Rhule	(substituted off) 72'
OC	13	Jesse Kriel	(substituted off) 56'
IC	12	Jan Serfontein
LW	11	Courtnall Skosan
FH	10	Elton Jantjies
SH	9	Ross Cronjé	(substituted off) 63'
N8	8	Warren Whiteley (c)
OF	7	Oupa Mohojé	(substituted off) 59'
BF	6	Siya Kolisi
RL	5	Franco Mostert	(substituted off) 63'
LL	4	Eben Etzebeth
TP	3	Frans Malherbe	(substituted off) 63'
HK	2	Malcolm Marx	(substituted off) 63'
LP	1	Tendai Mtawarira	(substituted off) 53'
Replacements:
HK	16	Bongi Mbonambi	(substituted in) 63'
PR	17	Steven Kitshoff	(substituted in) 53'
PR	18	Coenie Oosthuizen	(substituted in) 63'
LK	19	Pieter-Steph du Toit	(substituted in) 63'
FL	20	Jean-Luc du Preez	(substituted in) 59'
SH	21	Francois Hougaard	(substituted in) 63'
FH	22	François Steyn	(substituted in) 56'
WG	23	Dillyn Leyds	(substituted in) 72'
Coach:
(South Africa) Allister Coetzee

FB	15	Brice Dulin	(yellow card) 60' to 70'	(substituted off) 70'
RW	14	Yoann Huget
OC	13	Henry Chavancy
IC	12	Gaël Fickou
LW	11	Virimi Vakatawa
FH	10	Jules Plisson		(substituted off) 70'
SH	9	Maxime Machenaud		(substituted off) 46'
N8	8	Louis Picamoles		(substituted off) 63'
OF	7	Loann Goujon		(substituted off) 51'
BF	6	Yacouba Camara
RL	5	Yoann Maestri (c)
LL	4	Julien Le Devedec
TP	3	Uini Atonio		(substituted off) 21'	(substituted in) 26'	(substituted off) 53'
HK	2	Clément Maynadier		(substituted off) 51'
LP	1	Jefferson Poirot		(substituted off) 59'
Replacements:
HK	16	Camille Chat		(substituted in) 51'
PR	17	Eddy Ben Arous		(substituted in) 59'
PR	18	Mohamed Boughanmi		(substituted in) 21'	(substituted off) 26'	(substituted in) 53'
FL	19	Bernard Le Roux		(substituted in) 63'
FL	20	Kevin Gourdon		(substituted in) 51'
SH	21	Baptiste Serin		(substituted in) 46'
FH	22	Jean-Marc Doussain		(substituted in) 70'
WG	23	Vincent Rattez		(substituted in) 70'
Coach:
(France) Guy Novès

Man of the Match:
Malcolm Marx (South Africa)

Touch judges:
Ben O'Keeffe (New Zealand)
Marius Mitrea (Italy)
Television match official:
Rowan Kitt (England)

Notes:

- Andries Coetzee, Ross Cronjé, Dillyn Leyds, Raymond Rhule and Courtnall Skosan (all South Africa) and Mohamed Boughanmi and Vincent Rattez (both France) made their international debuts.

=== Second test ===
17 June 2017
17:00 SAST (UTC+02)

South Africa	37–15	France
Try: Serfontein 20' c Kolisi 27' c Oosthuizen 68' c Jantjies 79' c Con: Jantjies (4/4) 22', 28', 70', 80'; Pen: Jantjies (3/4) 6', 31', 39'	Report	Try: Spedding 3' c Penaud 54' m Con: Serin (1/1) 4'; Pen: Trinh-Duc (1/1) 64'

Growthpoint Kings Park, Durban
Referee: Ben O'Keeffe (New Zealand)

FB	15	Andries Coetzee
RW	14	Raymond Rhule	(substituted off) 79'
OC	13	Lionel Mapoe	(substituted off) 65'
IC	12	Jan Serfontein
LW	11	Courtnall Skosan
FH	10	Elton Jantjies
SH	9	Ross Cronjé	(substituted off) 65'
N8	8	Warren Whiteley (c)
OF	7	Oupa Mohojé	(substituted off) 14'
BF	6	Siya Kolisi
RL	5	Franco Mostert
LL	4	Eben Etzebeth	(substituted off) 65'
TP	3	Frans Malherbe	(substituted off) 65'
HK	2	Malcolm Marx	(substituted off) 74'
LP	1	Tendai Mtawarira	(substituted off) 53'
Replacements:
HK	16	Bongi Mbonambi	(substituted in) 74'
PR	17	Steven Kitshoff	(substituted in) 53'
PR	18	Coenie Oosthuizen	(substituted in) 65'
LK	19	Pieter-Steph du Toit	(substituted in) 65'
FL	20	Jean-Luc du Preez	(substituted in) 14'
SH	21	Francois Hougaard	(substituted in) 65'
FH	22	François Steyn	(substituted in) 65'
WG	23	Dillyn Leyds	(substituted in) 79'
Coach:
(South Africa) Allister Coetzee

FB	15	Scott Spedding
RW	14	Yoann Huget	(substituted off) 13'
OC	13	Damian Penaud
IC	12	Gaël Fickou
LW	11	Virimi Vakatawa
FH	10	François Trinh-Duc	(substituted off) 74'
SH	9	Baptiste Serin	(substituted off) 56'
N8	8	Louis Picamoles	(substituted off) 22'
OF	7	Kevin Gourdon
BF	6	Yacouba Camara
RL	5	Romain Taofifénua
LL	4	Yoann Maestri	(substituted off) 73'
TP	3	Rabah Slimani	(substituted off) 58'
HK	2	Guilhem Guirado (c)	(substituted off) 74'
LP	1	Jefferson Poirot	(substituted off) 58'
Replacements:
HK	16	Clément Maynadier	(substituted in) 74'
PR	17	Eddy Ben Arous	(substituted in) 58'
PR	18	Uini Atonio	(substituted in) 58'
FL	19	Julien Le Devedec	(substituted in) 73'
FL	20	Bernard Le Roux	(substituted in) 22'
SH	21	Antoine Dupont	(substituted in) 56'
FH	22	Jean-Marc Doussain	(substituted in) 74'
WG	23	Nans Ducuing	(substituted in) 13'
Coach:
(France) Guy Novès

Man of the Match:
Siya Kolisi (South Africa)

Touch judges:
Glen Jackson (New Zealand)
Angus Gardner (Australia)
Television match official:
Rowan Kitt (England)

Notes:

- Nans Ducuing and Damian Penaud (both France) made their international debuts. Penaud scored a try on his debut.
- Elton Jantjies passed 100 international points.

=== Third test ===
24 June 2017
17:00 SAST (UTC+02)

South Africa	35–12	France
Try: Kriel 6' c Etzebeth 41' m Marx 61' c Paige 74' c Con: Jantjies (3/4) 6', 61', 75'; Pen: Jantjies (3/4) 5', 22', 39'	Report	Pen: Plisson (4/5) 11', 15', 40', 57'

Emirates Airline Park, Johannesburg
Referee: Angus Gardner (Australia)

FB	15	Andries Coetzee
RW	14	Raymond Rhule	(substituted off) 71'
OC	13	Jesse Kriel
IC	12	Jan Serfontein
LW	11	Courtnall Skosan
FH	10	Elton Jantjies
SH	9	Francois Hougaard	(substituted off) 71'
N8	8	Jean-Luc du Preez	(substituted off) 55'
OF	7	Jaco Kriel	(substituted off) 71'
BF	6	Siya Kolisi
RL	5	Franco Mostert	(substituted off) 67'
LL	4	Eben Etzebeth (c)
TP	3	Ruan Dreyer	(substituted off) 55'
HK	2	Malcolm Marx	(substituted off) 67'
LP	1	Tendai Mtawarira	(substituted off) 55'
Replacements:
HK	16	Bongi Mbonambi	(substituted in) 67'
PR	17	Steven Kitshoff	(substituted in) 55'
PR	18	Coenie Oosthuizen	(substituted in) 55'
LK	19	Pieter-Steph du Toit	(substituted in) 55'
LK	20	Lood de Jager	(substituted in) 67'
SH	21	Rudy Paige	(substituted in) 71'
FH	22	François Steyn	(substituted in) 71'
WG	23	Dillyn Leyds	(substituted in) 71'
Coach:
(South Africa) Allister Coetzee

FB	15	Brice Dulin
RW	14	Nans Ducuing
OC	13	Damian Penaud	(substituted off) 64'
IC	12	Gaël Fickou
LW	11	Virimi Vakatawa	(substituted off) 77'
FH	10	Jules Plisson
SH	9	Baptiste Serin	(substituted off) 71'
N8	8	Louis Picamoles	(substituted off) 70'
OF	7	Kevin Gourdon
BF	6	Yacouba Camara	(substituted off) 40'
RL	5	Romain Taofifénua	(substituted off) 64'
LL	4	Yoann Maestri
TP	3	Rabah Slimani	(substituted off) 58'	(substituted in) 70'
HK	2	Guilhem Guirado (c)
LP	1	Jefferson Poirot	(substituted off) 68'
Replacements:
HK	16	Clément Maynadier	(substituted in) 70'
PR	17	Xavier Chiocci	(substituted in) 68'
PR	18	Uini Atonio	(substituted in) 58'	(substituted off) 70'
LK	19	Paul Jedrasiak	(substituted in) 64'
FL	20	Loann Goujon	(substituted in) 40'
SH	21	Maxime Machenaud	(substituted in) 71'
FH	22	François Trinh-Duc	(substituted in) 64'
WG	23	Vincent Rattez	(substituted in) 77'
Coach:
(France) Guy Novès

Man of the Match:

Touch judges:
Glen Jackson (New Zealand)
Ben O'Keeffe (New Zealand)
Television match official:
Rowan Kitt (England)

Notes:

- Ruan Dreyer (South Africa) made his international debut.
- South African captain Warren Whiteley was declared as forfeit just before the kick-off.

== See also ==
- 2017 mid-year rugby union internationals
- History of rugby union matches between France and South Africa
