= Boughanmi =

Boughanmi is a surname. Notable people with the surname include:

- Maroua Boughanmi (born 1992), Tunisian volleyball player
- Mohamed Boughanmi (born 1991), French rugby union player
- Ossama Boughanmi (born 1990), Tunisian footballer
- Oussama Boughanmi (born 1990), Tunisian handball player
