= Enrique Pieretto =

Argentine rugby union player

- Born: Enrique Pieretto Heiland; 15 December 1994 (age 31) Córdoba, Argentina
- Height: 1.86 m (6 ft 1 in)
- Weight: 122 kg (19.2 st; 269 lb)

Rugby union career
- Position: Loosehead Prop
Senior career
| Years | Team | Apps | (Points) |
| 2014–2015 | Córdoba Athletico | 1 | (0) |
| 2016−2019 | Jaguares | 33 | (0) |
| 2019–2020 | Exeter Chiefs | 10 | (0) |
| 2020–2024 | Glasgow Warriors | 35 | (0) |
| 2024 | → New South Wales Waratahs | 1 | (0) |
| 2024–2025 | Provence Rugby | 13 | (0) |
| 2025–2026 | Zebre Parma | 8 | (0) |
- Correct as of 16 Dec 2025
International career
| Years | Team | Apps | (Points) |
| 2013 | Argentina U19 | 3 | (5) |
| 2014 | Argentina U20 | 3 | (5) |
| 2016− | Argentina | 30 | (0) |
| 2021 | Argentina XV | 1 | (0) |
- Correct as of 17 Dec 2025

Enrique 'Kike' Pieretto Heiland (born 15 December 1994) is an Argentina international rugby union player who plays for Zebre Parma. He previously played for Scottish United Rugby Championship side Glasgow Warriors and the Australian side New South Wales Waratahs.

== Career ==
=== Professional career ===
He was part of the training group contingent at the Jaguares in the 2016 Super Rugby season, but despite this made 8 appearances for the Super Rugby side.

Pieretto suffered an ACL injury prior to the 2018 Super Rugby season that ruled him out of action for 6 to 7 months.

Pieretto joined English club Exeter Chiefs in November 2019 for the remainder of the 2019–20 season, and joined Scottish Pro14 club Glasgow Warriors on a two-year contract from the 2020–21 season.

He became Glasgow Warrior No. 313 on his debut on 28 August 2020 against Edinburgh at Murrayfield Stadium. He won the Most Improved Player award in the season 2020–21.

He joined New South Wales Waratahs on loan in May 2024.

He joined French club Provence Rugby in September 2024 until December 2025, when he signed for Zebre Parma.

=== International career ===
Having played rugby from a young age, Pieretto was selected for the Argentina under-19's team in 2013 to face neighbouring sides Uruguay U19, Chile U19 and Brazil U19. Enrique played in all 3 matches, scoring a try against Brazil on 21 September. In 2014, he was selected for the Pumitas for the 2014 IRB Junior World Championship in New Zealand. He played in the 'big games' against Australia and England, but the team failed to win either game. He started in the Semifinals of the 9–12th place play-offs against Fiji, but did not make an appearance in the 9th place game against Scotland.

In January 2016, Pieretto was called up to the senior side for the 2016 Americas Rugby Championship, where he made an appearance in 4 of the uncapped games. He made his international debut for the Pumas on 4 June 2016, starting against Chile in the 2016 Sudamérica Rugby Cup. He was called up to the senior squad for their 2-test series against France and a test against Italy, coming off the bench against Italy and in the second test against France. He was later called up for the 2016 Rugby Championship.
