= Baptiste Serin =

French rugby union player (born 1994)

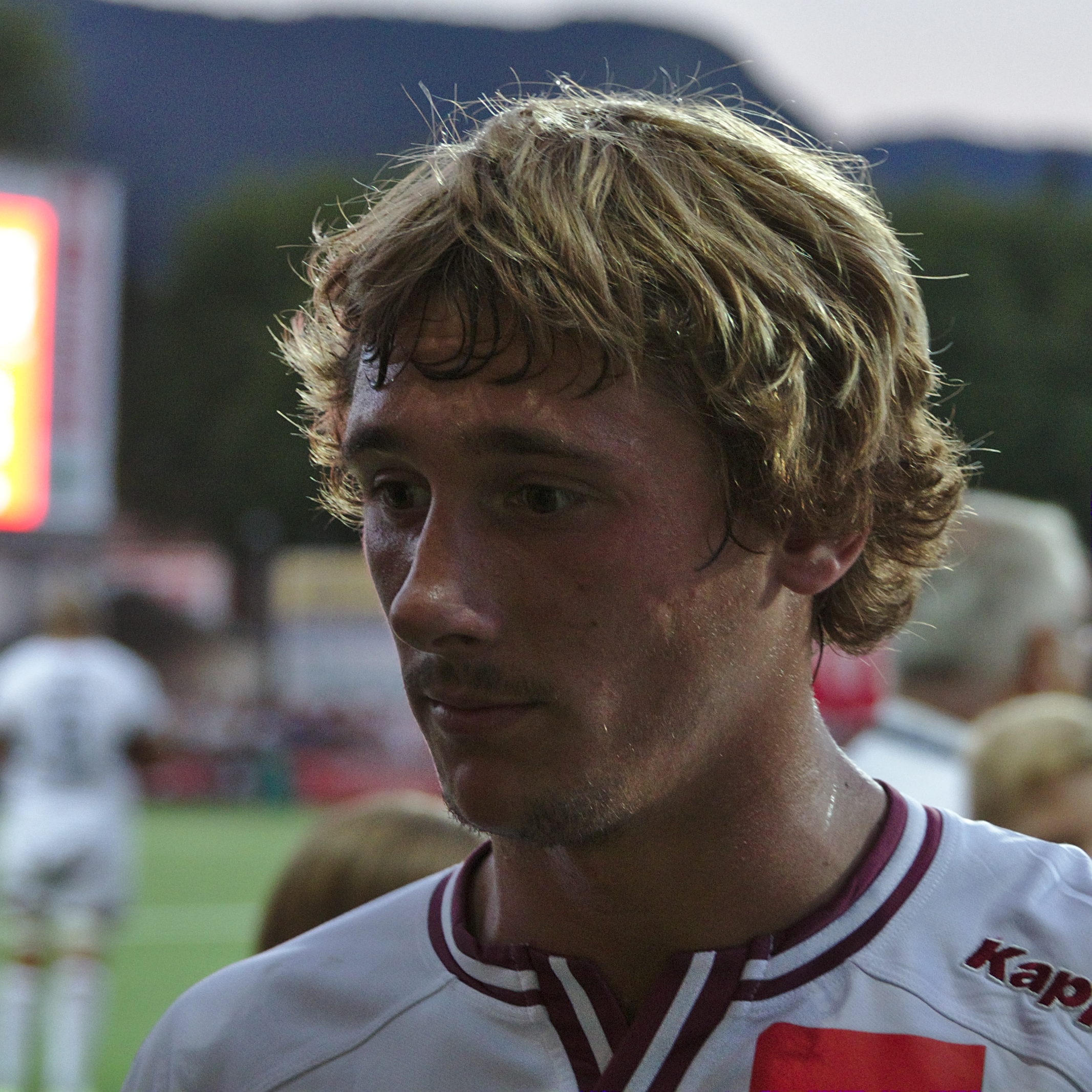
- Serin while at UBB in 2015.
- Born: Baptiste Serin; 20 June 1994 (age 32) La Teste-de-Buch, France
- Height: 1.80 m (5 ft 11 in)
- Weight: 87 kg (192 lb; 13 st 10 lb)

Rugby union career
- Position: Scrum-half
- Current team: Toulon
Amateur team(s)
Years	Team	Apps	(Points)
1997–2009	Parentis		
2009–2012	CA Bordeaux Bègles		
Senior career
Years	Team	Apps	(Points)
2012–2019	Bordeaux Bègles	119	(463)
2019–	Toulon	155	(401)
- Correct as of 22 Sep 2026
International career
Years	Team	Apps	(Points)
2013–2014	France U20	19	(106)
2016–	France	54	(108)
- Correct as of 22 Sep 2026

Baptiste Serin (born 20 June 1994) is a French rugby union player. His position is Scrum-half and he currently plays for Toulon and the France national team.

== Club career ==
Born in La Teste-de-Buch in Gironde, Serin began his career with nearby club Bordeaux Bègles in the Top 14.

== International career ==
He made his international debut during France's 2016 tour of Argentina. He started the first match at scrum-half, paired with Jules Plisson at fly-half, and received praise from coaches, players, and the press despite being in the losing side (30-19). He started the second match as well, this time associated with François Trinh-Duc, and this time took on the kicking duties too. They won that game 0-27 in what was Guy Novès's first away win as France manager, with Serin shining again. He was then included in the 2016/17 30-man "elite" list, made of players selected by the French national team to be protected and not allowed to play more than 30 games that year. He was then selected to play in the Autumn Internationals but started all three games on the bench, behind Maxime Machenaud. France ended the series with a 19–24 loss to world champions New Zealand, in which Serin came onto the pitch during the second half and gave a remarkable out-the-back pass for Louis Picamoles to score the only French try of the game. Baptiste made his 6 Nations debut against England on 4 February 2017.

=== International tries ===
International tries
No.	Date	Venue	Opponent	Score	Result	Competition
1	10 June 2017	Loftus Versfeld Stadium, Pretoria, South Africa	South Africa	16–12	37–14	2017 France tour of South Africa
2	18 November 2017	Stade de France, Saint-Denis, France	South Africa	5–8	17–18	2017 November internationals
3	23 June 2018	Forsyth Barr Stadium, Dunedin, New Zealand	New Zealand	0–5	49–14	2018 France tour of New Zealand
4	2 October 2019	Fukuoka Hakatanomori Stadium, Fukuoka, Japan	United States	17–9	33–9	2019 Rugby World Cup
5	9 February 2020	Stade de France, Saint-Denis, France	Italy	33–17	35–22	2020 Six Nations
6	28 November 2020	Stade de France, Saint-Denis, France	Italy	22–5	36–5	Autumn Nations Cup
7	6 July 2024	Estadio Malvinas Argentinas, Mendoza, Argentina	Argentina	3–8	13–28	2024 Argentina and Uruguay test series
8	13 July 2024	José Amalfitani Stadium, Buenos Aires, Argentina	Argentina	0–5	33–25	2024 Argentina and Uruguay test series

== Honours ==
France

- 1x Six Nations Championship: 2026
