= Christian Breseghello =

French rugby union player (1955–2026)

- Born: 23 January 1955 Mazères, France
- Died: 27 August 2026 (aged 71)
- Height: 1.79 m (5 ft 10 1/2 in)

Rugby union career
- Position: Prop
Senior career
Years	Team	Apps	(Points)
1973–1979	UA Saverdun		
1979–1985	Stade Toulousain		

Christian Breseghello (French: [kʁistjˈɑ̃ bʁəzɛɡɛlˈo]; 23 January 1955 – 27 August 2026) was a French rugby union player.

Breseghello played for UA Saverdun from 1973 to 1979 and for Stade Toulousain from 1979 to 1985, the latter of which he won the Coupe de France with in 1984 and the French Rugby Union Championship with in 1985. In addition to his rugby career, he served on the municipal council of Saverdun from 1989 to 2020. From 1989 to 2001, he was deputy mayor for sports and community activities.

Breseghello died on 27 August 2026, at the age of 71.
