= Julien Rey =

French rugby union player (born 1986)

- Born: 1 September 1986 (age 40) Toulouse, France
- Height: 6 ft 3 in (191 cm)
- Weight: 220 lb (100 kg)

Rugby union career
- Position: Centre
International career
Years	Team	Apps	(Points)
2016	France	2	(0)

Julien Rey (born 1 September 1986) is a French former rugby union international.

A native of Toulouse, Rey was capped twice for France during the 2016 tour of Argentina, a year after having toured the country with the French Barbarians. He started the first Test, at outside centre, then came off the bench as a winger for the second Test. At club level, he has played for US Colomiers, Bordeaux Bègles and US Carcassonne.

== See also ==
- List of France national rugby union players
