= Nans Ducuing =

France international rugby union player

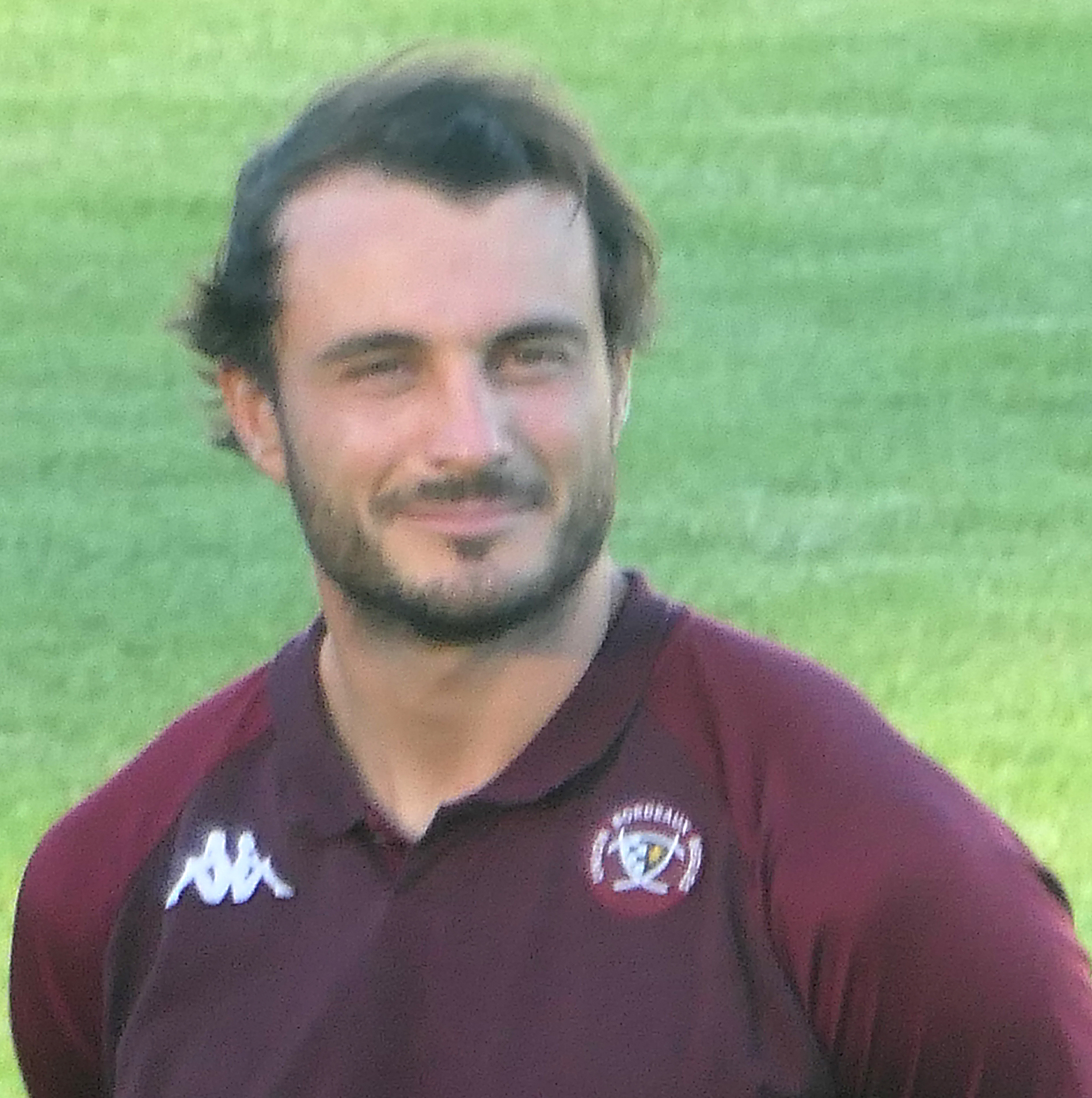
- Ducuing with Bordeaux Bègles in 2022
- Born: Nans Ducuing; 6 November 1991 (age 35) Bazus-Aure, France
- Height: 1.85 m (6 ft 1 in)
- Weight: 95 kg (14 st 13 lb)

Rugby union career
- Position: Full-back
- Current team: Bordeaux Bègles
Senior career
| Years | Team | Apps | (Points) |
| 2014–2015 | Perpignan | 11 | (5) |
| 2015–2025 | Bordeaux Bègles | 139 | (107) |
International career
| Years | Team | Apps | (Points) |
| 2017 | France | 4 | (0) |

Nans Ducuing (born 6 November 1991) is a former French rugby union full-back who played most of his career with Bordeaux Bègles. He also had a small stint with the France national team.

== International career ==
Ducuing was part of the French squad for the 2017 France rugby union tour of South Africa. He made his debut in the second test.
