= Guy Novès =

French rugby union player (born 1954)

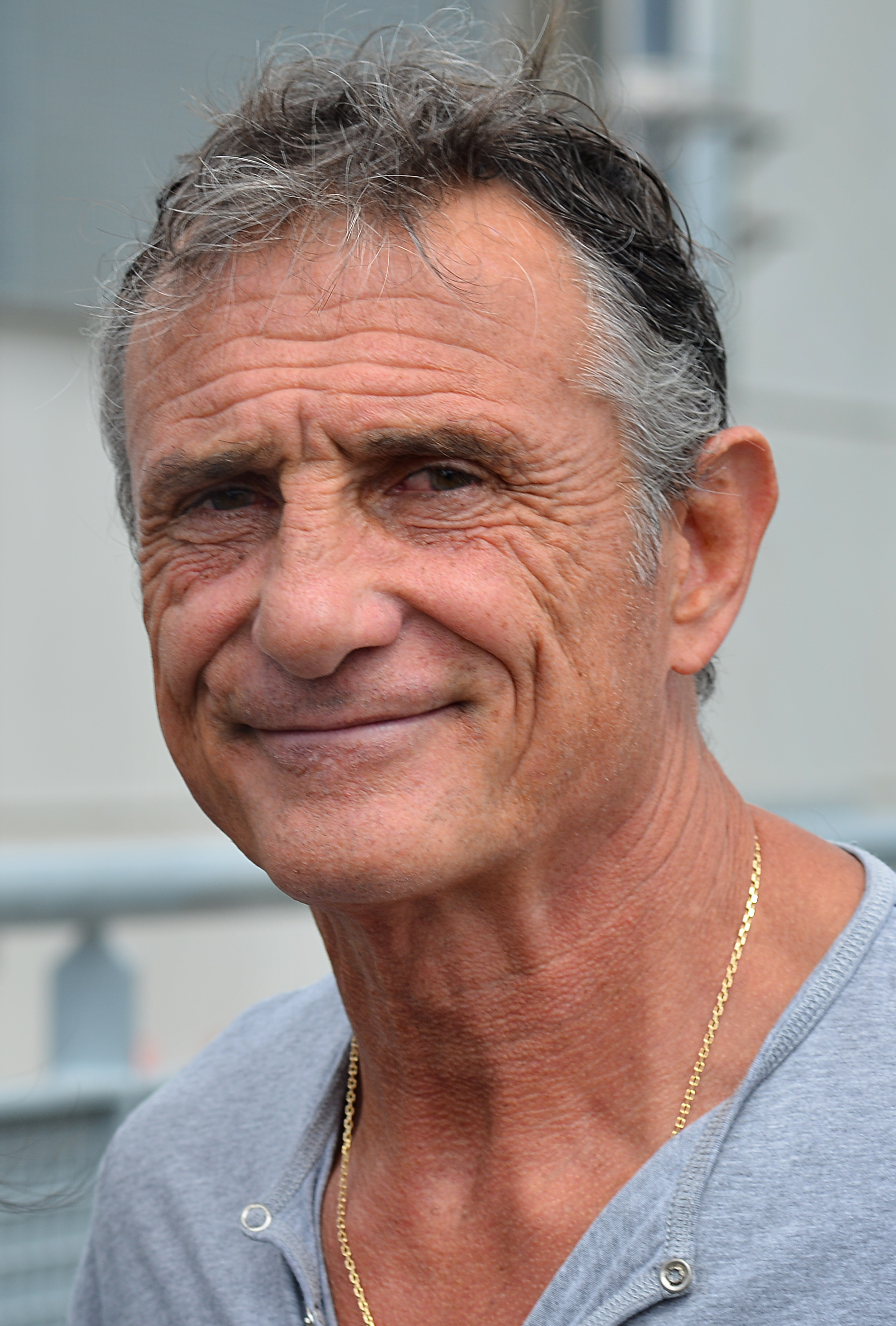
- Novès in 2014
- Born: 5 February 1954 (age 72) Toulouse, France
- Height: 1.80 m (5 ft 11 in)
- Weight: 78 kg (12 st 4 lb)

Rugby union career
- Position: Wing
Senior career
Years	Team	Apps	(Points)
1975–1988	Toulouse	259	(415)
- Correct as of 14 July 2016
International career
Years	Team	Apps	(Points)
1977–1979	France	7	(0)
- Correct as of 19 October 2015
Coaching career
- Years: Team
- 1988–1990: Toulouse (Asst. Coach)
- 1991–1992: Blagnac
- 1993–2015: Toulouse
- 2015–2017: France
- Correct as of 14 July 2016

Guy Novès (born 5 February 1954) is a former French rugby union player and most recently coach of the French national team. Born in Toulouse, Novès, who played on the wing, was capped seven times for his country, and played with Stade Toulousain from 1975 to 1987 and was a member of the team that won the Bouclier de Brennus in 1985 and 1986. He later coached the side in a tenure that lasted 22 years, when he won the French championship nine times and the Heineken Cup four times.

== Playing career ==
Before playing rugby, Novès played athletics at a high level, where on 3 July 1971 he won the national 1,200 metre race in record time, 3 minutes 16 seconds. He turned his attention to rugby in 1973, and in 1975 he was picked up by Toulouse in 1975 ahead of the 1975–76 French Rugby Union Championship season. He made his first appearance for the club on 9 November 1975 against Grenoble in the Challenge Yves du Manoir.

In 1977, Novès was selected for his nation, where on 11 November, he started in France's 18–13 win over New Zealand. In 1978, he played in one match of the 1978 Five Nations Championship, starting in their loss to Wales on 18 March in Cardiff. He played his last ever match for his nation on 17 February 1979 during the 1979 Five Nations Championship, where France finished as runner's up.

It wasn't until the early 1980s that Novès and Toulouse started to win silverware. During the 1979–80 French Rugby Union Championship, Toulouse finished runners-up to Béziers, losing 10–6, in what was their most successful Championship since 1969. In 1984, Novès helped Toulouse to their first French Cup title in 37 years, after beating Lourdes 6–0 in the final. He also helped Toulouse secure a place in the 1983/84 Challenge Yves du Manoir final, after helping beat the previous champions Agen 16–15 in the semi's, before going down to Narbonne 17–13 in the final. In the 1984–85 French Rugby Union Championship, Toulouse won their eight title, their first since 1947, after topping their Pool in the qualification round, before going onto defeat Bayonne, Béziers and Montferrand to reach the final. On 25 May 1985, Novès started on the wing in the final, and after 80 minutes, Toulouse and Toulon were all level 19–all. However, after extra time, Toulouse were the eventual champions winning 36–22. A year later, Toulouse retained the title after beating Agen 16–6 in the final.

In early 1988, Guy Novès announced that he would retire at the end of that season. During the 1987/88 season, Toulouse made it to the Quarter-finals of the French Rugby Union Championship, losing to Toulon 21–9. However, Toulouse did make it to the 1988 Challenge Yves du Manoir final, ironically after defeating Toulon 27–7 in the Semi-finals. On 20 May 1988, Novès played his last game for Toulouse, starting against Dax in the Challenge Yves du Manoir final, which was won by Toulouse 15–13.

=== Honours ===
Toulouse

- French Rugby Union Championship
  - Winners (2): 1985, 1986
  - Runner-up: 1980
- Challenge Yves du Manoir
  - Winners: 1988
  - Runners-up: 1984
- French Cup
  - Winners: 1984
  - Runners-up: 1985

France

- Five Nations Championship
  - Runners-up: 1978, 1979

== Coaching career ==
=== Toulouse ===
After retiring from playing rugby in 1988, he joined the Toulouse coaching set-up with Pierre Villepreux and Jean-Claude Skrela until 1990. In that time he worked as an assistant coach, taking charge of the backs, where he helped guide Toulouse to the 1988–89 French Rugby Union Championship title a year after he retired from playing.

He returned to the club in 1993 as head coach, replacing Pierre Villepreux. In his first two seasons in charge, he led his side to back-to-back French Rugby Union Championship titles, after defeating Montferrand 22–16 in 1994 and Castres 31–16 in 1995. The 1995 title, meant Toulouse became the most successful French team haven won 12 French Championship title. In 1996, the game went professional and the Championship was reduced from 32 teams to 20. Toulouse topped their pool during the 1995–96 French Rugby Union Championship before making their way to the final, defeating Catalane, Narbonne and Dax en route. On 1 June 1996, Toulouse retained their title after beating Brive 20–13 in the final. During that season, Toulouse won the inaugural Heineken Cup after beating Welsh side Cardiff 21–18 after extra time. In 1997, Toulouse won their fourth consecutive French Rugby Union Championship, the first team to do this since Stade Bordelais who won the title between 1904 and 1907.

In 2001, Guy Novès left his professorship EPS that he held since 1978 to devote himself entirely to his coaching position. This move proved itself, with Toulouse going on to win seven titles until Novès' departure. In 2005, Novès led Toulouse to their third Heineken Cup title after beating Stade Français 18–12 in the final. Toulouse became the first ever team in the Heineken Cup to win three Heineken Cup titles, after they also won the 2003 Heineken Cup Final. During the 2005–06 Top 14 season, the Championship was reduced to just 14 teams as the game became more professional. Despite finishing third on the table after the regular season, Toulouse made it to the final after beating Stade Français 12–9 in the semi's. However, they were beaten by Biarritz in the final 40–13.

In 2008, Toulouse were close to earning a rare double Championship across the Top 14 and Heineken Cup. However, Munster defeated Toulouse in 2008 Heineken Cup Final 16–13, though Toulouse did later go onto win the 2007–08 Top 14 season, earning a victory over Clermont 26–20. Between 2010 and 2012, Toulouse earned three title, the 2009–10 Heineken Cup title and back-to-back Championship titles in the Top 14 in 2011 and 2012. Between 2012 and 2015, Toulouse failed to make a single final, the longest period the team had gone without being in a final in the professional era. Further more, Toulouse were even knocked out of the Quarter-finals of the 2012–13 European Challenge Cup, after dropping down from the 2012–13 Heineken Cup. On 6 June 2015, Novès coached his last game at Toulouse, losing to Clermont 18–14 in the Quarter-finals of the 2014–15 Top 14 season.

==== Honours ====
As Head Coach (1993–2015)

- French Rugby Union Championship / Top 16 / Top 14
  - Winners (9): 1994, 1995, 1996, 1997, 1999, 2001, 2008, 2011, 2012
  - Runner-up (2): 2003, 2006
- Heineken Cup
  - Winners (4): 1996, 2003, 2005, 2010
  - Runners-up (2): 2004, 2008
- Challenge Yves du Manoir
  - Winners: 1995, 1998

As Assistant Coach (1988–1990)

- French Rugby Union Championship
  - Winners: 1989

=== Head coach of France ===
He was one of the candidates tipped to replace Bernard Laporte at the end of the 2007 Rugby World Cup, but that position went to Marc Lièvremont, after Novès declined the offer to stay with Toulouse. Eight years later, Novès was announced as the next head coach of France, replacing Philippe Saint-André after the 2015 Rugby World Cup.

On 19 January 2016, Novès named his first squad, including eight uncapped players. His first match in charge was on 6 February during the 2016 Six Nations Championship against Italy at the Stade de France. Novès bled 6 uncapped players in that match day team, defeating Italy 23–21. A week later, Novès led France to their first victory over Ireland since August 2011, running out 10–9 victors. Guy Novès' first defeat came on 26 February against Wales, losing 19–10, before going on to lose to Scotland, 29–18, for the first time since 2006. In the final match of the Championship, England had already secured the title, a win for France would only stop the grand slam. However, in a match in which France failed to score any tries, England were the victors 31–21. In June 2016, France toured Argentina for a two-test series. Unfortunately for Novès, due to the 2015 Rugby World Cup, Top 14 organizers did not schedule any games during the pool phase of the tournament, which meant it would end at a later date than normal. Therefore, the semi-finals and final of the 2015–16 season would coincide with the June international window, clashing with the French games on the 19 and 25 June. Due to this, Novès named 12 uncapped players in his touring squad, and 7 players who had played less than 10 tests for their country. The first test was lost 30–19, in a match that had 10 new players capped for the first time. However, a week later, France defeated Argentina 27–0, the first time Argentina has failed to score any points in a test match since they lost 16–0 against Ireland in 2007. It is the first time they have failed to score any points against France since their first ever meeting in 1949. During the 2016 end of year tests, Novès led France to a single victory, beating Samoa 52–8 in the opening week of their November series. The following two tests saw France lose narrowly to Australia 25–23 and New Zealand 24–19.

During the 2017 Six Nations Championship, France finished in their highest position since the 2011 Six Nations Championship. They secured three wins in the Championship, defeating Scotland 22–16, Italy 40–18 and Wales 20–18. The Wales match saw France claim the victory twenty minutes into overtime (100 game minutes), beating Wales for the first time since 2011. In June 2017, Novès took France on their first test series to South Africa since 2005, and their first away fixture to South Africa since 2010. Despite the South African side having thirteen players with less than ten caps in their squad, the Springboks convincingly won the series 3–0, winning the first test 37–14, the second 37–15 and the final test 35–12. Following the series loss, France dropped to eighth place in the World Rankings. The French Rugby Federation president backed Novès to take France through to the next World Cup.

During the End-of-year internationals, Novès failed to lead France to a single victory in four matches, losing to New Zealand, twice, (one uncapped) 38–18 and 28–23 before losing to South Africa 18–17. This was followed by a first ever draw to Japan, 23–23. This was the first time since losing to Tonga in 2011 that France had failed to defeat a Tier 2 nation. On 27 December 2017, Novès was sacked due to a series of poor results. He became the first coach to ever be sacked in the history of the French national team. He left the French team with just 7 wins in 21 tests.

==== International matches as head coach ====
Note: World Rankings Column shows the World Ranking France was placed at on the following Monday after each of their matches

Matches (2016–2017)
Matches	Date	Opposition	Venue	Score (Fra.–Opponent)	Competition	Captain	World Ranking
2016
1	6 February	Italy	Stade de France, Saint-Denis	23–21	Six Nations	Guilhem Guirado	8th
2	13 February	Ireland	Stade de France, Saint-Denis	10–9	Six Nations	Guilhem Guirado	7th
3	26 February	Wales	Millennium Stadium, Cardiff	10–19	Six Nations	Guilhem Guirado	7th
4	13 March	Scotland	Murrayfield Stadium, Edinburgh	18–29	Six Nations	Guilhem Guirado	8th
5	19 March	England	Stade de France, Saint-Denis	21–31	Six Nations	Guilhem Guirado	8th
6	19 June	Argentina	Estadio Monumental José Fierro, Tucumán	19–30	Argentina test series	Jules Plisson	9th
7	25 June	Argentina	Estadio Monumental José Fierro, Tucumán	27–0	Argentina test series	Yoann Maestri	7th
8	12 November	Samoa	Stadium Municipal, Toulouse	52–8	Autumn internationals	Guilhem Guirado	7th
9	19 November	Australia	Stade de France, Saint-Denis	23–25	Autumn internationals	Guilhem Guirado	8th
10	26 November	New Zealand	Stade de France, Saint-Denis	19–24	Autumn internationals	Guilhem Guirado	8th
2017
11	4 February	England	Twickenham Stadium, London	16–19	Six Nations	Guilhem Guirado	8th
12	12 February	Scotland	Stade de France, Saint-Denis	22–16	Six Nations	Guilhem Guirado	7th
13	25 February	Ireland	Aviva Stadium, Dublin	9–19	Six Nations	Guilhem Guirado	8th
14	11 March	Italy	Stadio Olimpico, Rome	40–18	Six Nations	Guilhem Guirado	8th
15	18 March	Wales	Stade de France, Saint-Denis	20–18	Six Nations	Guilhem Guirado	6th
16	10 June	South Africa	Loftus Versfeld Stadium, Pretoria	14–37	South African test series	Yoann Maestri	8th
17	17 June	South Africa	Kings Park Stadium, Durban	15–37	South African test series	Guilhem Guirado	8th
18	24 June	South Africa	Ellis Park Stadium, Johannesburg	12–35	South African test series	Guilhem Guirado	8th
19	11 November	New Zealand	Stade de France, Saint-Denis	18–38	Autumn internationals	Guilhem Guirado	8th
20	18 November	South Africa	Stade de France, Saint-Denis	17–18	Autumn internationals	Guilhem Guirado	8th
21	25 November	Japan	U Arena, Nanterre	23–23	Autumn internationals	Guilhem Guirado	9th

==== Record by country ====
Opponent	Played	Won	Drew	Lost	Win ratio (%)	For	Against
Argentina	2	1	0	1	50%	46	30
Australia	1	0	0	1	0%	23	25
England	2	0	0	2	0%	37	50
Ireland	2	1	0	1	50%	19	28
Italy	2	2	0	0	100%	63	39
Japan	1	0	1	0	0%	23	23
New Zealand	2	0	0	2	0%	37	62
Samoa	1	1	0	0	100%	52	8
Scotland	2	1	0	1	50%	40	45
South Africa	4	0	0	4	0%	58	127
Wales	2	1	0	1	50%	30	37
TOTAL	21	7	1	13	33%	428	474

==== Honours ====
- Six Nations Championship
  - Third: 2017
- Giuseppe Garibaldi Trophy
  - Winners: 2016, 2017

Sporting positions
Preceded by (France) Philippe Saint-André	French National Rugby Union Coach; 2015 – 2017	Succeeded by (France) Jacques Brunel
