= Xavier Mignot =

French rugby union player (born 1994)

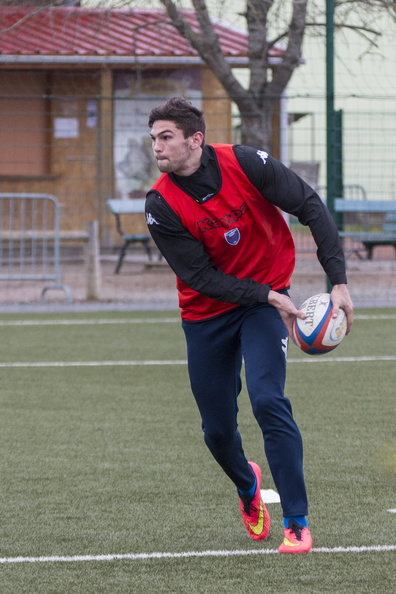
- Born: 27 January 1994 (age 32) Bourgoin-Jallieu, France
- Height: 6 ft 2 in (188 cm)
- Weight: 220 lb (100 kg)

Rugby union career
- Position: Wing
International career
Years	Team	Apps	(Points)
2016	France	1	(0)

Xavier Mignot (born 27 January 1994) is a French professional rugby union player.

Mignot, the son of a rugby coach, plays in the Top 14 with Lyon OU and was a member of their 2021–22 Challenge Cup winning side. He was previously at FC Grenoble from 2014 to 2017.

On a tour of Argentina in 2016, Mignot was capped for France in the first Test, which he started on the wing.

Mignot's younger brother Pierre plays for the France national rugby sevens team.

== See also ==
- List of France national rugby union players
