= Gilbert Doucet =

French rugby union player (1956–2020)

- Born: 25 March 1956 Lourdes, France
- Died: 7 July 2020 (aged 64)
- Height: 1.82 m (6.0 ft)
- Weight: 95 kg (209 lb)

Rugby union career
- Position: Flanker
Senior career
Years	Team	Apps	(Points)
?–1976	FC Lourdes		
?–?	RC Toulonnais		
?–?	RC Nice		
?–?	US La Seyne		
?–?	Stade Marseillais UC		
Coaching career
- Years: Team
- ?–?: Stade Marseillais Université Club
- 1993–1996: US La Seyne
- 1996–1997: RC Toulonnais
- 1997–1998: FC Grenoble
- 1999–2002: Rugby Roma Olimpic
- 2002–2004: Rugby Calvisano
- 2004–2006: Aviron Bayonnais
- 2006–2007: RC Toulonnais
- 2007–2014: Provence Rugby
- 2014–2016: RC Nice

Gilbert Doucet (25 March 1956 – 7 July 2020) was a French rugby union player and coach.

== Awards ==
- Finalist in the 1984–85 French Rugby Union Championship
