= Fabrice Metz =

French rugby union player (born 1991)

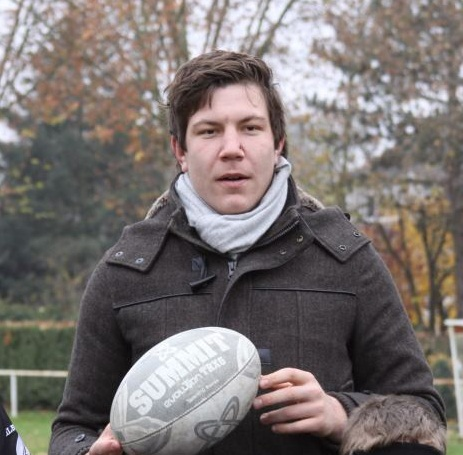
- Born: Fabrice Metz; 23 January 1991 (age 35) Strasbourg, France
- Height: 1.97 m (6 ft 6 in)
- Weight: 115 kg (18 st 2 lb)

Rugby union career
- Position: Lock
Senior career
Years	Team	Apps	(Points)
2011-15	Racing Métro	67	(0)
2015-16	Oyonnax Rugby	23	(0)
2016-	Section Paloise	87	(5)
- Correct as of 18 December 2019
International career
Years	Team	Apps	(Points)
2016	France	1	(0)
- Correct as of 20 June 2016

Fabrice Metz (born 23 January 1991) is a French professional rugby union player. His regular playing position is lock for Section Paloise in the Top 14.

Fabrice Metz has also played for the following teams: Oyonnax, Pau, France (national).
