= Facundo Bosch =

Argentine rugby union player

- Born: 8 August 1991 (age 35) Necochea, Argentina
- Height: 5 ft 11 in (1.80 m)
- Weight: 220 lb (15 st 10 lb; 100 kg)

Rugby union career
- Position: Hooker
Amateur team(s)
Years	Team	Apps	(Points)
2012−2017	Mar del Plata		
Senior career
Years	Team	Apps	(Points)
2011−2017	CUBA	54	(85)
2015–2017	Pampas XV	3	(0)
2017–2019	Agen	45	(45)
2019–	Aviron Bayonnais	15	(5)
Super Rugby
Years	Team	Apps	(Points)
2016	Jaguares	6	(0)
- Correct as of 1 August 2016
International career
Years	Team	Apps	(Points)
2014	Argentina Jaguars	5	(5)
2016−	Argentina	8	(10)
- Correct as of 25 August 2018

Facundo Bosch (born 8 August 1991) is an Argentine rugby union player who plays at Hooker for the national Argentina team The Pumas and Aviron Bayonnais.

Bosch started playing as semi-professional level in 2011 for Club Universitario de Buenos Aires where he picked up 33 appearances for his club. He played for the Jaguares in 2016. He moved to France in 2017 to play for Agen. In 2019 he was signed by Stade Rochelais. In the summer of 2022, he joined Basque club Aviron Bayonnais.

In May 2014, he was selected for a South American XV side to face the Pumas in a pre-season friendly before the 2014 June internationals. That month, he was selected for the Argentina Jaguars ahead of the 2014 IRB Tbilisi Cup, where he made his first appearance of the bench against Emerging Italy. He started against Georgia on 18 June, but was red carded on the 70th minute for fighting with Georgian prop Giorgi Mtchedlishvili.

In 2016, Bosh was called up to the senior Argentina side ahead of the 2016 Americas Rugby Championship, but following an injury sustained in training 2 days before the first game, he was withdrawn from the side. In May 2016, he made his international debut, starting against Uruguay in the 2016 Sudamérica Rugby Cup. He was called up to the senior squad for their 2-test series against France and a test against Italy but did not make an appearance in the June window. He was later called up for the 2016 Rugby Championship.

== Honours ==
=== Club ===
(France) La Rochelle

- European Rugby Champions Cup: 2021–2022
