= Jérôme Bianchi =

France international rugby union player

- Born: 31 July 1961 (age 65) Pau, France
- Height: 5 ft 10 in (178 cm)
- Weight: 177 lb (80 kg)

Rugby union career
- Position: Fullback
International career
Years	Team	Apps	(Points)
1986	France	1	(0)

Jérôme Bianchi (born 31 July 1961) is a French former international rugby union player.

Bianchi, who spent his childhood in Casablanca, played his rugby as a fullback

A RC Toulon player, Bianchi was the top point-scorer in the 1984–85 French Championship and played in the club's 1986–87 Brennus Shield title. He won a France cap against Argentina in Buenos Aires in 1986.

Bianchi is a physiotherapist who in 2013 began working with Maria Sharapova.

== See also ==
- List of France national rugby union players
