= Rémi Bonfils =

French rugby union player (born 1988)

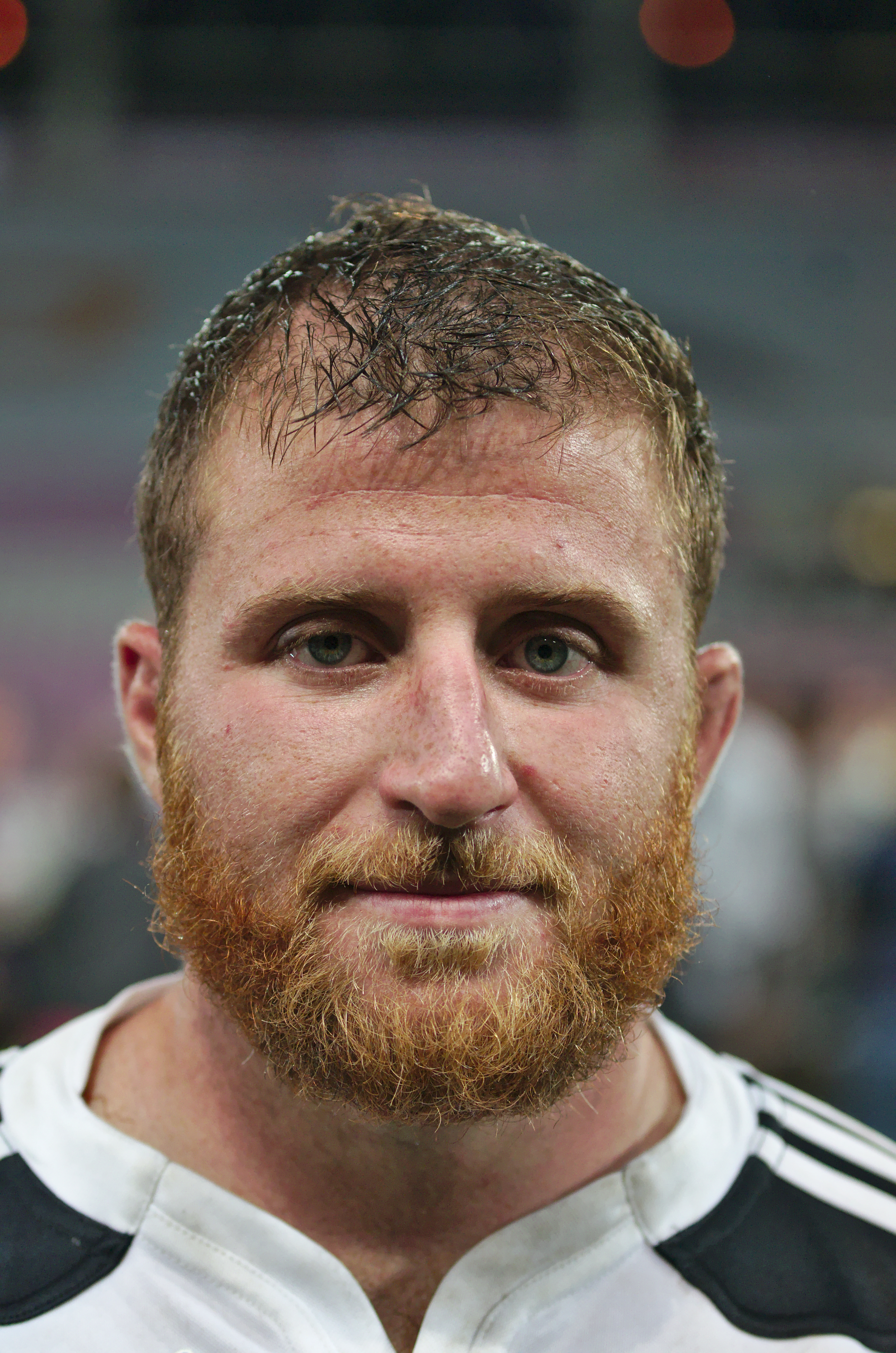
- Born: 26 September 1988 (age 38) Paris, France
- Height: 1.78 m (5 ft 10 in)
- Weight: 101 kg (15 st 13 lb; 223 lb)

Rugby union career
- Position: Hooker
Senior career
Years	Team	Apps	(Points)
2010-	Stade Français	116	(55)
- Correct as of 31 January 2015
International career
Years	Team	Apps	(Points)
2016-	France	2	(5)
- Correct as of 25 June 2016

Rémi Bonfils (born 26 September 1988 in Paris, France) is a French rugby union player. He plays at hooker for Stade Français in the Top 14.
