= Lucas Pointud =

French rugby union player (born 1988)

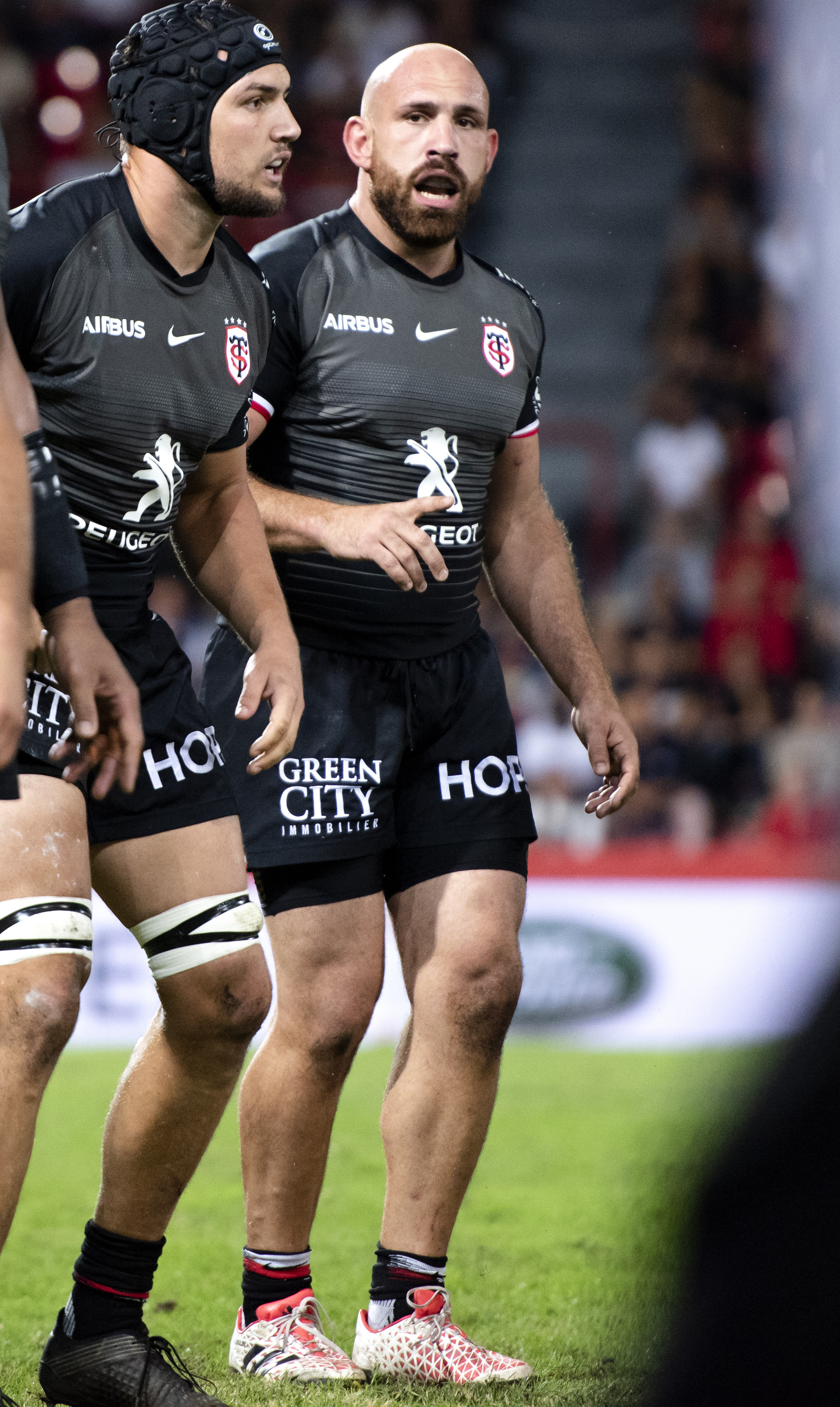
- Born: Lucas Pointud; 18 January 1988 (age 38)
- Height: 1.88 m (6 ft 2 in)
- Weight: 127 kg (20 st 0 lb)

Rugby union career
- Position: Prop
Senior career
Years	Team	Apps	(Points)
2009–2010	Béziers	16	(0)
2010–2011	Narbonne	4	(0)
2011–2012	Saint-Étienne	15	(15)
2012–2013	Castanet	17	(10)
2013–2014	Tarbes	27	(5)
2014–2015	Bayonne	19	(5)
2015–2017	Brive	36	(10)
2017-19	Stade Toulousain	24	(0)
2019-	Section Paloise	16	(0)
- Correct as of 18 December 2019
International career
Years	Team	Apps	(Points)
2016	France	3	(0)
- Correct as of 25 June 2016

Lucas Pointud (born 18 January 1988) is a French professional rugby union player. He currently plays at prop for Brive in the Top 14.
