= William Demotte =

France international rugby union player

- Born: William Demotte; 22 May 1991 (age 35) Clermont-Ferrand, France
- Height: 2.02 m (6 ft 7 1/2 in)
- Weight: 124 kg (19 st 7 lb; 273 lb)

Rugby union career
- Position: Lock
- Current team: Grenoble
Youth career
- 2008–2012: Clermont Auvergne
Senior career
Years	Team	Apps	(Points)
2012–2017	Agen	88	(0)
2017–2019	La Rochelle	17	(0)
2019–	Grenoble	18	(0)
- Correct as of 30 April 2021
International career
Years	Team	Apps	(Points)
2016–	France	1	(0)
- Correct as of 20 June 2016

William Demotte is a French professional rugby union player with Grenoble in the Pro D2 League. His favoured position is second-row, and he has the immense size required to play in such a position (202 cm tall and 124 kg in weight). He is seen as a great prospect for the future of French rugby.
