= Djibril Camara =

France international rugby union player

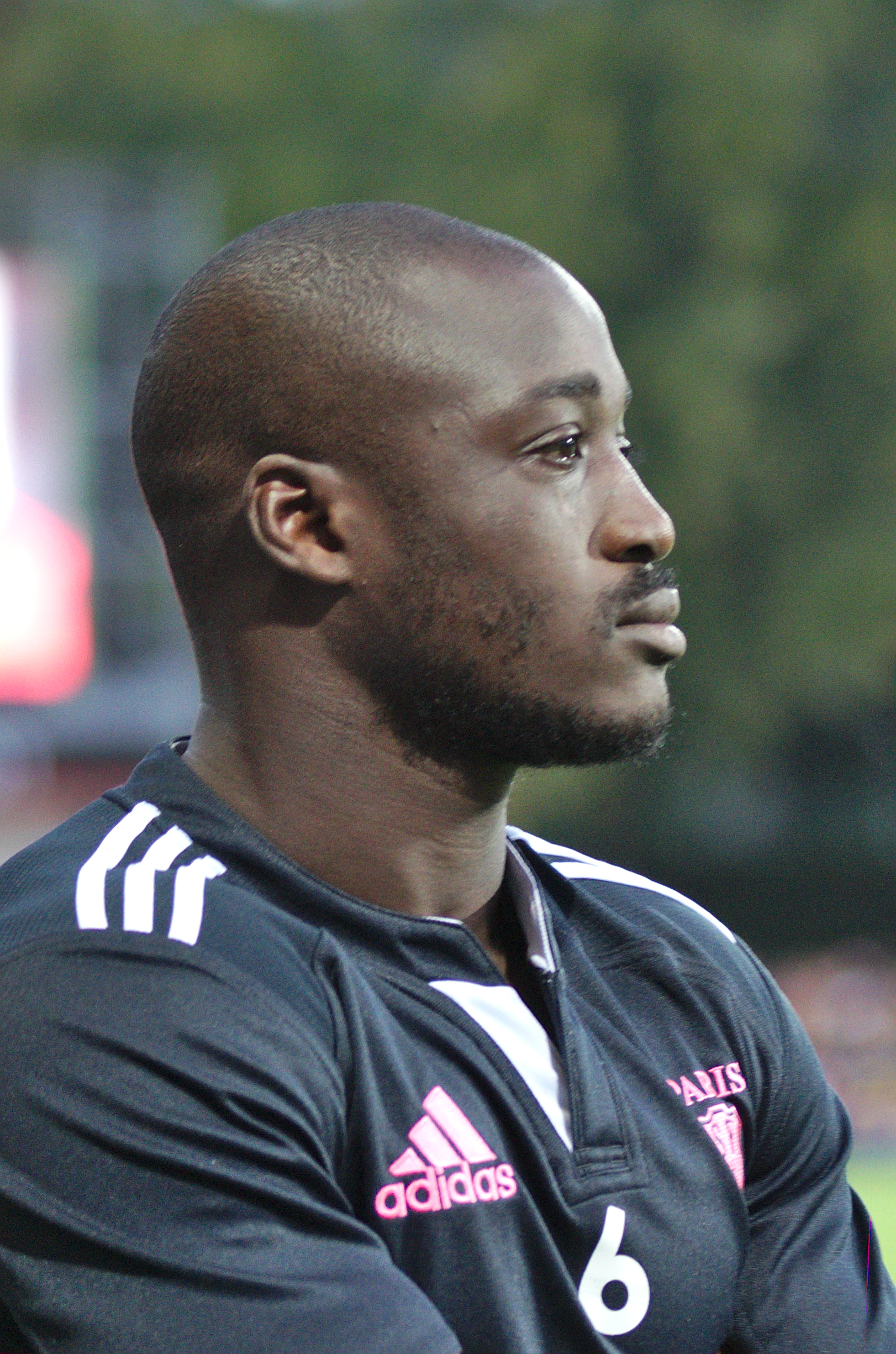
- Born: Djibril Camara; 22 June 1989 (age 37) Juvisy-sur-Orge, France
- Height: 1.81 m (5 ft 11 in)
- Weight: 85 kg (13 st 5 lb; 187 lb)

Rugby union career
- Position: Wing
Senior career
Years	Team	Apps	(Points)
2007–2019	Stade Français	183	(215)
2019–	Bayonne	14	(10)
- Correct as of 22 February 2019
International career
Years	Team	Apps	(Points)
2007	France U19	4	(5)
2008–2009	France U20	8	(30)
2016–	France	4	(0)
- Correct as of 26 February 2017

Djibril Camara (born 22 June 1989) is a French rugby union player. He plays at wing for Bayonne in the Top 14. He is born in France, and is of Senegalese descent.
