= Mohamed Boughanmi =

French rugby union player (born 1991)

- Born: Mohamed Boughanmi; 27 October 1991 (age 35) France
- Height: 1.94 m (6 ft 4 1/2 in)
- Weight: 126 kg (19 st 12 lb)

Rugby union career
- Position: Tighthead Prop
- Current team: La Rochelle
Senior career
Years	Team	Apps	(Points)
2011–2013	Bobigny	13	(10)
2013–2015	Béziers	33	(15)
2015–2016	Toulon	6	(0)
2016–2019	La Rochelle	48	(40)
2019–	Section Paloise	18	(5)
- Correct as of 18 December 2019
International career
Years	Team	Apps	(Points)
2017–	France	1	(0)
- Correct as of 10 June 2017

Mohamed Boughanmi (born 27 October 1991) is a French rugby union tighthead prop and he currently plays for Section Paloise and the France national team.

== International career ==
Boughanmi was part of the French squad for the 2017 Six Nations Championship. He made his debut in the first test of the 2017 France rugby union tour of South Africa.
