= Clément Maynadier =

French rugby union player (born 1988)

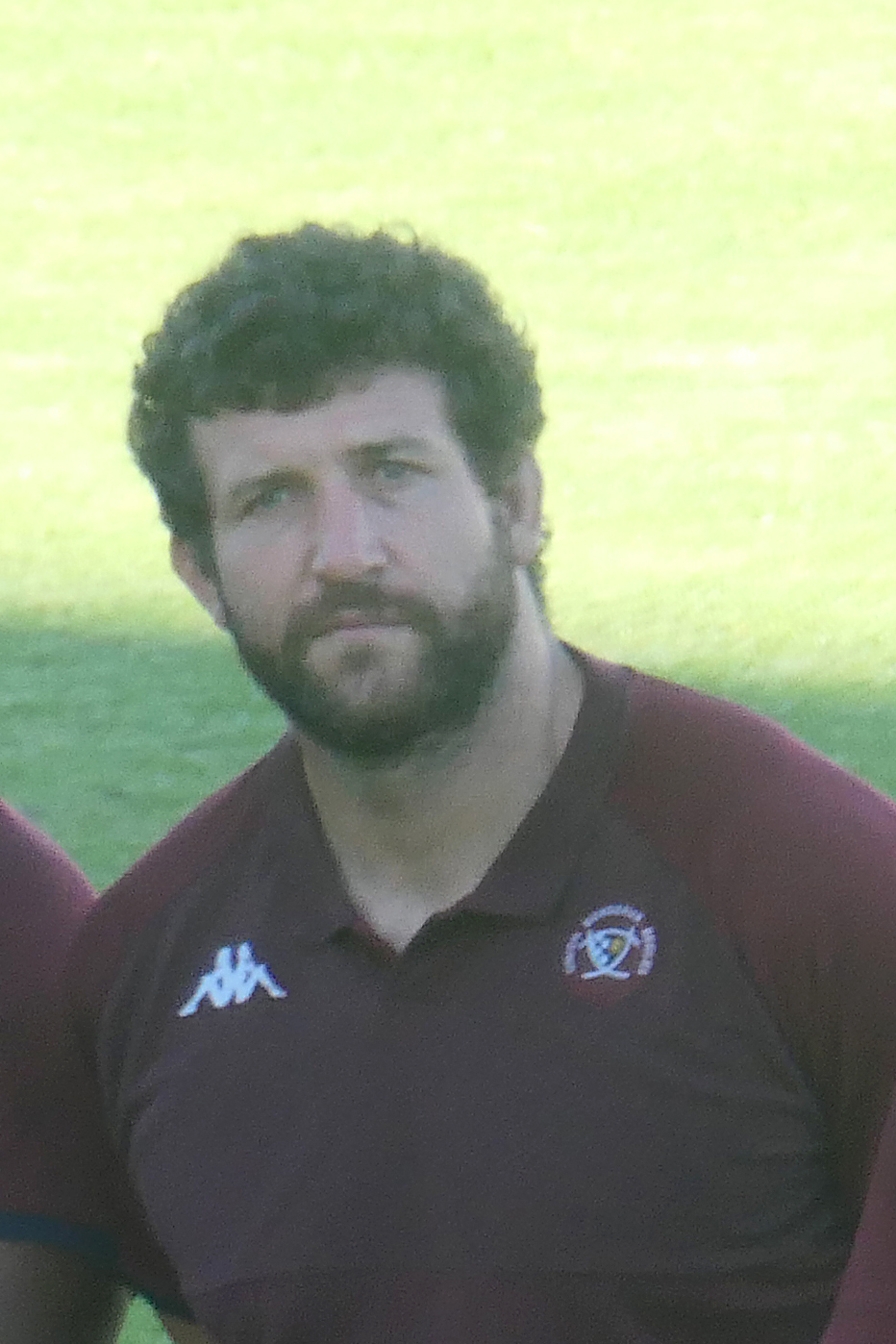
- Clément Maynadier in 2022
- Born: Clément Maynadier; 11 October 1988 (age 38) Toulouse, France
- Height: 1.87 m (6 ft 1 1/2 in)
- Weight: 100 kg (15 st 10 lb)

Rugby union career
- Position: Hooker
Senior career
Years	Team	Apps	(Points)
2008–2013	Albi	91	(10)
2013–2024	Bordeaux-Bègles	228	(90)
International career
Years	Team	Apps	(Points)
2016–2017	France	8	(0)

Clément Maynadier (born 11 October 1988) is a former French rugby union hooker who played most of his career with Bordeaux Bègles. He has finished École des mines d'Albi-Carmaux and works as an engineer at Safran Aircraft Engines.

== International career ==
Maynadier made his debut for France in June 2016 and was part of the squad for the 2017 Six Nations Championship.
