= Philippe Rougé-Thomas =

France international rugby union player (born 1961)

- Born: 1 August 1961 (age 65)
- Height: 1.78 m (5 ft 10 in)
- Weight: 195 lb (88 kg)

Rugby union career
- Position: Fly-half
Amateur team(s)
Years	Team	Apps	(Points)
	Stade Toulousain	1981-1993	
International career
Years	Team	Apps	(Points)
1989	France	2	(4)

Philippe Rougé-Thomas (born 1 August 1961) is a French rugby union player who was capped 2 times. He played for France.

Rougé-Thomas played as Fly-half for the Stade Toulousain where he won 4 French Championship. With France he played 2 matches against the All Blacks in 1989. After his retirement he became backs coach of Stade Toulousain.

== Honours ==
- Selected to represent France, 1989
- French Championship 1985, 1986, 1989 and 1994
- Challenge Yves du Manoir 1988, 1993
