= Jean-Marie Cadieu =

French rugby union player (born 1963)

- Born: 16 October 1963 (age 63) Tulle, France
- Height: 1.93 m (6 ft 4 in)
- Weight: 102 kg (16 st 1 lb)

Rugby union career
- Position: Lock
Amateur team(s)
Years	Team	Apps	(Points)
1982-1993	Stade Toulousain		
1993-1995	RC Narbonne		
Senior career
Years	Team	Apps	(Points)
1995-2006	RC Narbonne		
International career
Years	Team	Apps	(Points)
1991-1992	France	12	(4)

Jean-Marie Cadieu (born 16 October 1963 in Tulle) is a former French rugby union player. He played as a lock.

Cadieu played for Stade Toulousain from 1982/83 to 1992/93, where he won three titles of the French Championship, in 1984/85, 1985/86 and 1988/89, and a Cup of France, in 1983/84. He then moved to RC Narbonne, where he developed from 1993/94 to 2005/06, when he finished his career.

Cadieu had 12 caps for France, from 1991 to 1992, scoring one try, four points in aggregate. He played four games at the 1991 Rugby World Cup. He had two matches at the Five Nations Championship in 1992.
