= Albert Cigagna =

France international rugby union player

Albert Cigagna (born 25 September 1960 in Toulouse) is a former French rugby union footballer. He played as number-eight. He was nicknamed Matabiau.

Cigagna first played at Stade Bagnérais, moving then to Stade Toulousain, where he played from 1983/84 to 1994/95 and he ended his club career at Castres Olympique in 1995/96. He was capitan of Stade Toulousain, from 1988/89 to 1994/95. He won five titles of French Champion, in 1985, 1986, 1989, 1994 and 1995, and the Cup of France, in 1984.

He was a member of France Squad at the 1995 Rugby World Cup finals, where his country reached the 3rd place. He had the only cap of his career at the match for the 3rd place, aged 34 years old. Cigagna was, then, the oldest debutant for France ever.

After the end of his career, he's been Physical and Sporting Education teacher and was coach of the youth team of Mazère Cassagne Sports, in 2006.
