= Karl Janik =

France international rugby union player (born 1960)

- Born: 12 January 1960 (age 66) Oujda, Morocco
- Height: 6 ft 2 in (188 cm)
- Weight: 221 lb (100 kg)

Rugby union career
- Position: Flanker
International career
Years	Team	Apps	(Points)
1987	France	1	(0)

Karl Janik (born 12 January 1960) is a French former rugby union international.

Janik was born in the Moroccan city of Oujda, where his Berlin-raised father Reinhard worked as a PE teacher. His father is credited with having scouted French-Moroccan rugby player Abdelatif Benazzi, who went on to captain France.

A discus thrower in his youth, Janik was boys' discus champion at the World Gymnasiade in 1976 and competed in two editions of the European Junior Athletics Championships.

Janik was a one-club player, winning three French rugby championships with Stade Toulousain. He gained a France cap in 1987 as an openside flanker against Romania at Stade Armandie in Agen, which France won by 46 points.

After coaching US Lisloise and Rouen Normandie during the late 1990s, Janik coached at university level in Rouen for several seasons, before his appointment as team manager of the women's national team in 2014.

== See also ==
- List of France national rugby union players
