= 2011 Heineken Cup final =

2011 Heineken Cup Final
- Event: 2010–11 Heineken Cup
Leinster	Northampton Saints
(Ireland)	(England)
33	22
- Date: 21 May 2011
- Venue: Millennium Stadium, Cardiff
- Man of the Match: Johnny Sexton (Leinster)
- Referee: Romain Poite (France)
- Attendance: 72,456

The 2011 Heineken Cup Final was the final match of the 2010–11 Heineken Cup, the 16th season of Europe's top club rugby union competition. The match was played on 21 May 2011 at Millennium Stadium in Cardiff, Wales. The match was contested by Northampton Saints of England and Leinster of Ireland, the second Heineken Cup final for each club. Leinster won the match 33–22 after being 22–6 down at half-time. The win was Leinster's second win in three years of the competition.

== Background ==
The Millennium Stadium was chosen as the venue for the 2011 Heineken Cup Final on 17 May 2010. The stadium has already hosted three Heineken Cup Finals. The first, in 2002, saw Leicester Tigers defeat Munster 19–15. Munster returned for the next Cardiff final in 2006, defeating French side Biarritz 23–19. Two years later, Munster faced and defeated another French side, Toulouse, with the final score 16–13.

Northampton Saints had played in one previous Heineken Cup Final—in 2000. The Saints defeated Munster 9–8 at Twickenham in London. From their victory until the 2010–11 season, they had made the knockout stages only twice: in 2003 and 2005.

Leinster reached the semi-finals four times previously (1996, 2003, 2006 and 2010) and also won in the 2009 final at Murrayfield in Edinburgh. Their run to the 2009 final was memorable for their quarter-final victory over Harlequins in a match marred by the Bloodgate scandal.

== Consequences for other clubs ==
Following the Amlin Challenge Cup final on 20 May at Cardiff City Stadium, the result of the 2011 Heineken Cup Final had the potential to secure a Heineken Cup berth for one of two clubs not involved in that match. Under rules of the Heineken Cup organiser, European Rugby Cup (ERC), the winners of both the Heineken Cup and the second-tier Amlin Challenge Cup receive berths in the following year's Heineken Cup. These berths are not counted against a country's normal allocation, except when either England or France produces winners of both cups in the same season. Currently, England is normally entitled to six Heineken Cup berths and Ireland to three; England is capped at seven berths (as is France).

Both participants in the 2011 final had already qualified for the 2011–12 Heineken Cup by their domestic performance—Leinster by finishing second in the Celtic League and Northampton Saints by finishing fourth in the Aviva Premiership.

Leinster won the final and therefore Connacht, who finished last among the four Irish teams in the Celtic League, claimed Ireland's extra Heineken Cup berth.

== Match ==
=== Summary ===
Northampton scored three tries, and held Leinster without a try, in the first half. Northampton led the match 22–6 at the half. In one of the most remarkable turnarounds, Leinster scored 27 points in the second half, and held Northampton scoreless, to win the match 33–22. Johnny Sexton, reportedly having given a rousing half-time team talk referencing Liverpool's 2005 Uefa Champions League Final comeback, scored 22 second-half points; two tries, three conversions, and two penalties to lead Leinster to an unlikely come from behind victory. Sexton was named man-of-the-match.

=== Details ===
21 May 2011
17:00

Northampton Saints (England)	22–33	(Ireland) Leinster
Try: Dowson 7' c Foden 30' c Hartley 39' m Con: Myler (2/3); Pen: Myler (1/1) 20'	Report	Try: Sexton (2) 43' c, 52' c Hines 64' c Con: Sexton (3/3); Pen: Sexton (4/5) 13', 35', 56', 60'

Millennium Stadium, Cardiff
Attendance: 72,456
Referee: Romain Poite (France)

Northampton	Leinster

FB	15	(England) Ben Foden
RW	14	(England) Chris Ashton
OC	13	(England) Jon Clarke
IC	12	(Ireland) James Downey
LW	11	(England) Paul Diggin
FH	10	(England) Stephen Myler
SH	9	(England) Lee Dickson
N8	8	(Ireland) Roger Wilson
OF	7	(England) Phil Dowson
BF	6	(England) Calum Clark
RL	5	(England) Christian Day
LL	4	(England) Courtney Lawes
TP	3	(South Africa) Brian Mujati
HK	2	(England) Dylan Hartley (c)
LP	1	(Tonga) Soane Tongaʻuiha
Substitutions:
HK	16	(England) Brett Sharman
PR	17	(England) Alex Waller
PR	18	(England) Tom Mercey
LK	19	(New Zealand) Mark Sorenson
FL	20	(England) Mark Easter
SH	21	(South Africa) Stuart Commins
FH	22	(England) Shane Geraghty
CE	23	(Scotland) Joe Ansbro
Coach:
(England) Jim Mallinder

FB	15	(Fiji) Isa Nacewa
RW	14	(Ireland) Shane Horgan
OC	13	(Ireland) Brian O'Driscoll
IC	12	(Ireland) Gordon D'Arcy
LW	11	(Ireland) Luke Fitzgerald
FH	10	(Ireland) Johnny Sexton
SH	9	(Ireland) Eoin Reddan
N8	8	(Ireland) Jamie Heaslip
OF	7	(Ireland) Seán O'Brien
BF	6	(Ireland) Kevin McLaughlin
RL	5	(Scotland) Nathan Hines
LL	4	(Ireland) Leo Cullen (c)
TP	3	(Ireland) Mike Ross
HK	2	(South Africa) Richardt Strauss
LP	1	(Ireland) Cian Healy
Substitutions:
HK	16	(Ireland) Jason Harris-Wright
PR	17	(South Africa) Heinke van der Merwe
PR	18	(Cook Islands) Stan Wright
LK	19	(Ireland) Devin Toner
FL	20	(Ireland) Shane Jennings
SH	21	(Ireland) Isaac Boss
FH	22	(Ireland) Ian Madigan
CE	23	(Ireland) Fergus McFadden
Coach:
(New Zealand) Josef Schmidt

Touch judges:
Jérôme Garcès (France)
Pascal Gaüzère (France)
Television match official:
Giulio De Santis (Italy)

== See also ==
- 2010–11 Heineken Cup
