= 2010–11 Premiership Rugby =

Rugby union competition in England

2010–11 Aviva Premiership
- Countries: England
- Date: 3 September 2010 – 28 May 2011
- Champions: Saracens (1st title)
- Runners-up: Leicester Tigers
- Relegated: Leeds Carnegie
- Matches played: 135
- Attendance: 1,740,751 (average 12,894 per match)
- Tries scored: 507 (average 3.8 per match)
- Top point scorer: Jimmy Gopperth (Newcastle) (230 points)
- Top try scorer: Alesana Tuilagi (Leicester) (13 tries)

Official website
- premiershiprugby.com

The 2010–11 Aviva Premiership was the 24th season of the top flight English domestic rugby union competition and the first one to be sponsored by Aviva. The reigning champions entering the season were Leicester Tigers, who had claimed their ninth title after defeating Saracens in the 2010 final. Exeter Chiefs had been promoted as champions from the 2009–10 RFU Championship, their first promotion to the top flight.

== Summary ==
Saracens won their first title after defeating Leicester Tigers in the final at Twickenham after having finished second in the regular season table. Leeds Carnege were relegated on the last day of the season. It was the third time that Leeds have been relegated from the top flight since the leagues began and the first time since the 2007–08 Premiership Rugby season.

As usual, round 1 included the London Double Header at Twickenham, the seventh instance since its inception in 2004.

== Teams ==
Twelve teams compete in the league – the top eleven teams from the previous season and Exeter Chiefs who were promoted from the 2009–10 RFU Championship to the top flight for the first time. They replaced Worcester Warriors who were relegated after six years in the top flight.

=== Stadiums and locations ===
2010–11 Aviva Premiership Teams

Club	Director of Rugby / Head Coach	Captain	Kit Supplier	Stadium	Capacity	City/Area
Bath	(Australia) Steve Meehan	(South Africa) Luke Watson	Puma	The Recreation Ground	12,200	Bath, Somerset
Exeter Chiefs	(England) Rob Baxter	(Ireland) Tommy Hayes	Samurai Sportswear	Sandy Park	10,744	Exeter, Devon
Gloucester	(Scotland) Bryan Redpath	(England) Mike Tindall	RugbyTech	Kingsholm	16,500	Gloucester
Harlequins	(Ireland) Conor O'Shea	(England) Chris Robshaw	KooGa	Twickenham Stoop (Note: Harlequins will also play a home game at Twickenham Stadium on 27 December 2010)	14,282	Twickenham, Greater London
Leeds Carnegie	(England) Neil Back	(South Africa) Marco Wentzel	ISC	Headingley Stadium	22,250	Leeds, Yorkshire
Leicester Tigers	(England) Richard Cockerill	(Ireland) Geordan Murphy	Cotton Traders	Welford Road	24,000	Leicester
London Irish	(England) Toby Booth	(New Zealand) Clarke Dermody	RugbyTech	Madejski Stadium (Note: London Irish will also play a home game at Twickenham Stadium on 4 September 2010)	24,250	Reading, Berkshire
London Wasps	(England) Shaun Edwards	(England) Tom Rees	Canterbury	Adams Park (Note: London Wasps will also play a home game at Twickenham Stadium on 4 September 2010 and on 23 April 2011)	10,516	High Wycombe, Buckinghamshire
Newcastle Falcons	(Scotland) Alan Tait	(England) James Hudson	Cotton Traders	Kingston Park	10,200	Newcastle, Tyne and Wear
Northampton Saints	(England) Jim Mallinder	(England) Dylan Hartley	BURRDA	Franklin's Gardens	13,591	Northampton
Sale Sharks	(New Zealand) Mike Brewer	(England) Mark Cueto	Cotton Traders	Edgeley Park (Note: Sale will also play a home game at Reebok Stadium on 16 April 2011)	10,852	Stockport, Greater Manchester
Saracens	(South Africa) Brendan Venter	(England) Steve Borthwick	Nike	Vicarage Road (Note: Saracens will also play a home game at Wembley Stadium on 26 December 2010)	19,920	Watford, Hertfordshire

== Pre-season ==
The inaugural edition of the Premiership Rugby Sevens Series began on 16 July 2010 at The Stoop, continued on 23 July at Welford Road and 30 July at Franklin's Gardens. This was the first opportunity of the season for any of the teams competing in the Premiership to win a trophy. The finals were held on 6 August 2010 at The Recreation Ground and the Series was won by Saracens.

== Table ==
2010–11 Premiership Rugby Table
Pos	Team	Pld	W	D	L	PF	PA	PD	TF	TA	TB	LB	Pts	Qualification or relegation
1	Leicester Tigers (RU)	22	16	1	5	594	403	+191	67	29	8	4	78	Play-off place, Berth in the 2011–12 Heineken Cup
2	Saracens (C)	22	18	0	4	484	318	+166	35	26	2	2	76	Play-off place, Berth in the 2011–12 Heineken Cup
3	Gloucester (SF)	22	14	1	7	528	452	+76	58	43	5	4	67	Play-off place, Berth in the 2011–12 Heineken Cup
4	Northampton Saints (SF)	22	14	0	8	533	430	+103	58	38	6	3	65	Play-off place, Berth in the 2011–12 Heineken Cup
5	Bath	22	13	1	8	427	367	+60	38	34	5	3	62	Berth in the 2011–12 Heineken Cup
6	London Irish	22	11	0	11	523	459	+64	47	41	6	4	54	Berth in the 2011–12 Heineken Cup
7	Harlequins	22	9	2	11	482	384	+98	45	26	4	8	52	Berth in the 2011–12 Heineken Cup (Note: As a result of winning the 2010–11 European Challenge Cup)
8	Exeter Chiefs	22	10	0	12	428	460	−32	32	42	0	5	43 (Note: Exeter Chiefs deducted two points and fined £5,000 for naming three overseas players in the squad for their match at Leeds Carnegie.)	2011–12 European Challenge Cup
9	London Wasps	22	9	1	12	425	497	−72	36	45	1	4	43	2011–12 European Challenge Cup
10	Sale Sharks	22	6	1	15	432	618	−186	34	66	1	5	32	2011–12 European Challenge Cup
11	Newcastle Falcons	22	4	1	17	360	553	−193	27	55	0	5	23	2011–12 European Challenge Cup
12	Leeds Carnegie (Note: The champion of the Championship (Worcester Warriors) are eligible for promotion) (R)	22	4	0	18	315	590	−275	30	62	0	7	23	Relegated

Source: Premiership Rugby
Rules for classification: Tiebreakers for teams tied on points: 1) Number of matches won; 2) Difference between points for and against; 3) Total number of points for; 4) Aggregate number of points scored in matches between tied teams; 5) Number of matches won excluding the first match, then the second and so on until the tie is settled
(C) Champions; (RU) Runners-up; (SF) Losing semi-finalists; (R) Relegated

== Regular season ==
The fixture list was released on 29 June 2010.

=== Round 1 ===
3 September 2010
19:45

Sale Sharks	35–18	Newcastle Falcons
	Report

Edgeley Park
Attendance: 7,815
Referee: Dean Richards

4 September 2010
14:00

(1 BP) London Irish	33–16	Saracens
	Report

Twickenham
Attendance: 75,112
Referee: Andrew Small

4 September 2010
15:00

Exeter Chiefs	22–10	Gloucester Rugby
	Report

Sandy Park
Attendance: 9,562
Referee: Rob Debney

4 September 2010
16:30

London Wasps	29–29	Harlequins
	Report

Twickenham
Attendance: 75,112
Referee: Chris White

5 September 2010
15:00

Leeds Carnegie	16–32	Bath Rugby (1 BP)
	Report

Headingley
Attendance: 5,509

5 September 2010
15:00

Northampton Saints	27–19	Leicester Tigers
	Report

Franklin’s Gardens
Attendance: 13,498
Referee: Dave Pearson

=== Round 2 ===
10 September 2010
20:00

Newcastle Falcons	29–17	London Wasps
	Report

Kingston Park
Attendance: 5,159

11 September 2010
13:30

(1 BP) Harlequins	16–20	Northampton Saints
	Report

Twickenham Stoop
Attendance: 10,823
Referee: Andrew Small

11 September 2010
14:15

Bath Rugby	20–13	London Irish (1 BP)
	Report

Recreation Ground
Attendance: 11,005
Referee: Dave Pearson

11 September 2010
15:00

Gloucester Rugby	22–21	Leeds Carnegie (1 BP)
	Report

Kingsholm
Attendance: 9,994

11 September 2010
17:30

(1 BP) Leicester Tigers	37–27	Exeter Chiefs
	Report

Welford Road
Attendance: 17,956
Referee: Dean Richards

12 September 2010
14:15

Saracens	28–13	Sale Sharks
	Report

Vicarage Road
Attendance: 6,087
Referee: Wayne Barnes

=== Round 3 ===
17 September 2010
19:45

(1 BP) Northampton Saints	31–10	Bath Rugby
	Report

Franklin’s Gardens
Attendance: 13,491
Referee: Chris White

17 September 2010
19:45

Sale Sharks	21–17	Harlequins (1 BP)
	Report

Edgeley Park
Attendance: 6,026
Referee: Dave Pearson

18 September 2010
15:00

Exeter Chiefs	22–17	Newcastle Falcons (1 BP)
	Report

Sandy Park
Attendance: 7,326
Referee: Greg Garner

18 September 2010
15:05

London Wasps	37–30	Leicester Tigers (2 BP)
	Report

Adams Park
Attendance: 8,006
Referee: Wayne Barnes

19 September 2010
15:00

London Irish	23–16	Gloucester Rugby (1 BP)
	Report

Madejski Stadium
Attendance: 8,267
Referee: Dean Richards

19 September 2010
15:00

Leeds Carnegie	14–26	Saracens
	Report

Headingley
Attendance: 4,774
Referee: Sean Davey

=== Round 4 ===
25 September 2010
14:15

(1 BP) Bath	31–16	Sale Sharks
	Report

Recreation Ground
Attendance: 11,618

25 September 2010
14:30

Gloucester	22–20	London Wasps (1 BP)

Kingsholm
Attendance: 11,377

25 September 2010
15:00

(1 BP) Harlequins	40–13	Exeter Chiefs

Twickenham Stoop
Attendance: 11,461

25 September 2010
15:00

(1 BP) Leicester Tigers	48–6	Leeds Carnegie
	Report

Welford Road
Attendance: 17,063

25 September 2010
17:15

Newcastle Falcons	12–46	London Irish (1 BP)

Kingston Park
Attendance: 4,993

26 September 2010
15:00

Saracens	24–17	Northampton Saints (1 BP)
	Report

Vicarage Road
Attendance: 8,567

=== Round 5 ===
1 October 2010
19:45

(1 BP) Sale Sharks	24–25	London Wasps

Edgeley Park
Attendance: 7,202

1 October 2010
20:05

Bath Rugby	3–18	Gloucester Rugby

Recreation Ground
Attendance: 12,200

2 October 2010
15:00

Harlequins	23–12	Newcastle Falcons

Twickenham Stoop
Attendance: 10,813

2 October 2010
15:00

(1 BP) London Irish	40–24	Leeds Carnegie

Madejski Stadium
Attendance: 6,921

2 October 2010
15:00

Northampton Saints	27–21	Exeter Chiefs (1 BP)

Franklin's Gardens
Attendance: 13,296

3 October 2010
16:30

Saracens	26–20	Leicester Tigers (1 BP)

Vicarage Road
Attendance: 7,517

=== Round 6 ===
22 October 2010
19:45

(1 BP) Leeds Carnegie	3–6	Sale Sharks
	Report

Headingley
Attendance: 5,571

22 October 2010
20:00

(1 BP) Newcastle Falcons	13–15	Saracens
	Report

Kingston Park
Attendance: 5,391

23 October 2010
14:30

Leicester Tigers	21–15	Bath Rugby (1 BP)
	Report

Welford Road
Attendance: 21,194

23 October 2010
15:00

Gloucester Rugby	33–26	Harlequins (1 BP)
	Report

Kingsholm
Attendance: 11,919

23 October 2010
17:15

(1 BP) Exeter Chiefs	9–12	London Irish
	Report

Sandy Park
Attendance: 10,103

24 October 2010
14:45

London Wasps	10–37	Northampton Saints (1 BP)
	Report

Adams Park
Attendance: 9,206

=== Round 7 ===
30 October 2010
14:30

(1 BP) Northampton Saints	34–13	Newcastle Falcons
	Report

Franklin’s Gardens
Attendance: 13,356
Referee: Nigel Owens

30 October 2010
15:00

Saracens	9–23	Exeter Chiefs
	Report

Vicarage Road
Attendance: 6,512
Referee: Tim Wigglesworth

30 October 2010
17:30

Gloucester Rugby	19–12	Leicester Tigers (1 BP)
	Report

Kingsholm
Attendance: 13,970
Referee: Wayne Barnes

31 October 2010
15:00

Harlequins	6–6	Bath Rugby
	Report

Twickenham Stoop
Attendance: 14,047
Referee: Sean Davey

31 October 2010
15:00

Leeds Carnegie	8–17	London Wasps
	Report

Headingley
Attendance: 5,495
Referee: Dean Richards

31 October 2010
15:00

(1 BP) London Irish	39–26	Sale Sharks
	Report

Madejski Stadium
Attendance: 7,741
Referee: Martin Fox

=== Round 8 ===
19 November 2010
19:45

Sale Sharks	10–19	Northampton Saints
	Report

Edgeley Park
Attendance: 8,091

19 November 2010
19:45

Leicester Tigers	18–13	Harlequins (1 BP)
	Report

Welford Road
Attendance: 17,441

20 November 2010
15:00

Exeter Chiefs	15–9	Leeds Carnegie (1 BP)
	Report

Sandy Park
Attendance: 7,743

21 November 2010
14:45

London Wasps	33–25	London Irish
	Report

Adams Park
Attendance: 7,929

21 November 2010
15:00

Newcastle Falcons	12–6	Gloucester Rugby (1 BP)
	Report

Kingston Park
Attendance: 4,249

21 November 2010
16:15

(1 BP) Bath Rugby	13–17	Saracens
	Report

Recreation Ground
Attendance: 11,848

=== Round 9 ===
27 November 2010
15:00

Exeter Chiefs	24–19	Sale Sharks (1 BP)
	Report

Sandy Park
Attendance: 7,171

27 November 2010
15:00

(1 BP) Leicester Tigers	44–19	Newcastle Falcons
	Report

Welford Road
Attendance: 18,738

27 November 2010
15:00

(1 BP) Northampton Saints	35–23	London Irish
	Report

Franklin’s Gardens
Attendance: 13,456

27 November 2010
16:30

Gloucester Rugby	19–13	Saracens (1 BP)
	Report

Kingsholm
Attendance: 11,453

27 November 2010
17:30

(1 BP) Bath Rugby	6–11	London Wasps
	Report

Recreation Ground
Attendance: 11,911
Referee: Dean Richards

28 November 2010
15:00

(1 BP) Harlequins	51–18	Leeds Carnegie
	Report

Twickenham Stoop
Attendance: 10,676

=== Round 10 ===
3 December 2010
19:45

Sale Sharks	P – P	Gloucester Rugby

Edgeley Park

3 December 2010
20:00

Newcastle Falcons	P – P	Bath Rugby

Kingston Park

4 December 2010
15:00

London Irish	14–23	Leicester Tigers
	Report

Madejski Stadium
Attendance: 11,405

5 December 2010
14:45

London Wasps	24–12	Exeter Chiefs
	Report

Adams Park
Attendance: 7,931

5 December 2010
15:00

Leeds Carnegie	P – P	Northampton Saints

Headingley

5 December 2010
15:00

Saracens	26–14	Harlequins
	Report

Vicarage Road
Attendance: 6,035

=== Round 11 ===
26 December 2010
14:15

Bath Rugby	P – P	Exeter Chiefs

Recreation Ground

26 December 2010
15:00

Gloucester Rugby	P – P	Northampton Saints

Kingsholm

26 December 2010
15:00

Newcastle Falcons	P – P	Leeds Carnegie

Kingston Park

26 December 2010
15:00

Saracens	13–6	London Wasps (1 BP)
	Report

Wembley Stadium
Attendance: 38,425

27 December 2010
15:00

(1 BP) Leicester Tigers	54–21	Sale Sharks
	Report

Welford Road
Attendance: 24,000

27 December 2010
16:15

Harlequins	28–18	London Irish
	Report

Twickenham
Attendance: 74,212

=== Round 12 ===
1 January 2011
15:00

Leeds Carnegie	15–13	Gloucester Rugby (1 BP)
	Report

Headingley
Attendance: 12,015

1 January 2011
15:00

(1 BP) London Irish	24–25	Bath Rugby
	Report

Madejski Stadium
Attendance: 11,811

1 January 2011
15:00

(1 BP) Northampton Saints	13–16	Harlequins
	Report

Franklin’s Gardens
Attendance: 13,459

2 January 2011
14:45

London Wasps	33–16	Newcastle Falcons
	Report

Adams Park
Attendance: 7,614

2 January 2011
15:00

Sale Sharks	28–22	Saracens (1 BP)
	Report

Edgeley Park
Attendance: 8,646

2 January 2011
16:15

(1 BP) Exeter Chiefs	15–22	Leicester Tigers
	Report

Sandy Park
Attendance: 10,495

=== Round 13 ===
7 January 2011
19:45

Newcastle Falcons	19–19	Sale Sharks
	Report

Kingston Park
Attendance: 4,225

8 January 2011
14:15

Bath Rugby	16–13	Leeds Carnegie (1 BP)
	Report

Recreation Ground
Attendance: 10,800

8 January 2011
15:00

(1 BP) Gloucester Rugby	37–23	Exeter Chiefs
	Report

Kingsholm
Attendance: 13,401

8 January 2011
15:00

Harlequins	17–10	London Wasps (1 BP)
	Report

Twickenham Stoop
Attendance: 14,282

8 January 2011
15:00

Leicester Tigers	27–16	Northampton Saints
	Report

Welford Road
Attendance: 24,000

9 January 2011
15:00

Saracens	12–6	London Irish (1 BP)
	Report

Vicarage Road
Attendance: 7,013

=== Round 14 ===
11 February 2011
19:45

Sale Sharks	7–19	Bath Rugby
	Report

Edgeley Park
Attendance: 7,065

12 February 2011
12:30

London Irish	23–14	Newcastle Falcons
	Report

Madejski Stadium
Attendance: 6,806

12 February 2011
15:00

Exeter Chiefs	20–6	Harlequins
	Report

Sandy Park
Attendance: 8,733

12 February 2011
15:00

Northampton Saints	15–29	Saracens
	Report

Franklin’s Gardens
Attendance: 13,219

13 February 2011
15:00

(1 BP) Leeds Carnegie	9–15	Leicester Tigers
	Report

Headingley
Attendance: 6,762

13 February 2011
17:00

(1 BP) London Wasps	9–10	Gloucester Rugby
	Report

Adams Park
Attendance: 7,684

=== Round 15 ===
18 February 2011
19:45

Gloucester Rugby	23–9	London Irish
	Report

Kingsholm
Attendance: 12,333

18 February 2011
20:00

Newcastle Falcons	13–23	Exeter Chiefs
	Report

Kingston Park
Attendance: 5,729

19 February 2011
15:00

(1 BP) Bath Rugby	38–8	Northampton Saints
	Report

Recreation Ground
Attendance: 12,200

19 February 2011
15:00

Harlequins	21–9	Sale Sharks
	Report

Twickenham Stoop
Attendance: 11,852

19 February 2011
17:30

Leicester Tigers	21–12	London Wasps
	Report

Welford Road
Attendance: 21,215

20 February 2011
15:00

(1 BP) Saracens	39–0	Leeds Carnegie
	Report

Vicarage Road
Attendance: 6,029

=== Round 16 ===
25 February 2011
19:45

(1 BP) Sale Sharks	16–18	Leicester Tigers
	Report

Edgeley Park
Attendance: 8,115

26 February 2011
15:00

(1 BP) Exeter Chiefs	9–12	Bath Rugby
	Report

Sandy Park
Attendance: 10,486

26 February 2011
15:00

London Irish	15–9	Harlequins (1 BP)
	Report

Madejski Stadium
Attendance: 8,776

26 February 2011
15:00

(1 BP) Northampton Saints	16–18	Gloucester Rugby
	Report

Franklin’s Gardens
Attendance: 13,259

27 February 2011
13:00

London Wasps	15–26	Saracens
	Report

Adams Park
Attendance: 7,498

27 February 2011
17:30

Leeds Carnegie	5–22	Newcastle Falcons
	Report

Headingley
Attendance: 5,110

=== Round 17 ===
4 March 2011
20:00

Newcastle Falcons	33–18	Harlequins
	Report

Kingston Park
Attendance: 5,011

5 March 2011
15:00

(1 BP) Gloucester Rugby	34–22	Bath Rugby
	Report

Kingsholm
Attendance: 16,241

5 March 2011
15:15

(1 BP) Leicester Tigers	14–15	Saracens
	Report

Welford Road
Attendance: 22,451

6 March 2011
15:00

Exeter Chiefs	30–9	Northampton Saints
	Report

Sandy Park
Attendance: 8,977

6 March 2011
15:00

London Wasps	33–26	Sale Sharks (1 BP)
	Report

Adams Park
Attendance: 8,077

6 March 2011
15:00

Leeds Carnegie	27–19	London Irish
	Report

Headingley
Attendance: 4,242

=== Rescheduled Game (Round 10) ===
12 March 2011
15:00

Leeds Carnegie	13–23	Northampton Saints
	Report

Headingley
Attendance: 4,262

=== Round 18 ===
25 March 2011
19:45

Sale Sharks	15–12	Leeds Carnegie (1 BP)
	Report

Edgeley Park
Attendance: 6,972

26 March 2011
15:00

(1 BP) Harlequins	53–15	Gloucester Rugby
	Report

Twickenham Stoop
Attendance: 14,282

26 March 2011
15:00

(1 BP) London Irish	39–17	Exeter Chiefs
	Report

Madejski Stadium
Attendance: 20,011

26 March 2011
16:30

Bath Rugby	6–37	Leicester Tigers (1 BP)
	Report

Recreation Ground
Attendance: 12,200

27 March 2011
13:45

(1 BP) Northampton Saints	39–3	London Wasps
	Report

Franklin’s Gardens
Attendance: 13,385

27 March 2011
15:00

Saracens	24–9	Newcastle Falcons
	Report

Vicarage Road
Attendance: 7,135

=== Round 19 ===
2 April 2011
14:30

(1 BP) Northampton Saints	53–24	Sale Sharks
	Report

Franklin’s Gardens
Attendance: 13,312

2 April 2011
15:00

(1 BP) Gloucester Rugby	34–9	Newcastle Falcons
	Report

Kingsholm
Attendance: 12,931
Referee: Dean Richards

2 April 2011
17:30

(1 BP) Harlequins	13–17	Leicester Tigers
	Report

Twickenham Stoop
Attendance: 14,282
Referee: Wayne Barnes

3 April 2011
15:00

Leeds Carnegie	27–22	Exeter Chiefs (1 BP)
	Report

Headingley
Attendance: 4,097
Referee: Tim Wigglesworth

3 April 2011
15:00

London Irish	25–12	London Wasps
	Report

Madejski Stadium
Attendance: 9,789
Referee: Chris White

3 April 2011
15:00

Saracens	20–9	Bath Rugby
	Report

Vicarage Road
Attendance: 9,653
Referee: Nigel Owens

=== Rescheduled Games (Round 10 & 11) ===
8 April 2011
19:45

(1 BP) Sale Sharks	36–31	Gloucester Rugby (1 BP)
	Report

Edgeley Park
Attendance: 6,888

9 April 2011
14:30

Bath Rugby	26–18	Exeter Chiefs
	Report

Recreation Ground
Attendance: 12,200

9 April 2011
15:00

(1 BP) Newcastle Falcons	29–30	Leeds Carnegie
	Report

Kingston Park
Attendance: 5,724

=== Round 20 ===
15 April 2011
19:45

(1 BP) Newcastle Falcons	15–22	Northampton Saints
	Report

Kingston Park
Attendance: 5,167
Referee: Greg Garner

16 April 2011
14:15

Bath Rugby	19–15	Harlequins (1 BP)
	Report

Recreation Ground
Attendance: 12,200
Referee: Dave Pearson

16 April 2011
15:00

Exeter Chiefs	12–33	Saracens
	Report

Sandy Park
Attendance: 9,561
Referee: Dean Richards

16 April 2011
15:00

(1 BP) Leicester Tigers	41–41	Gloucester Rugby (1 BP)
	Report

Welford Road
Attendance: 24,000
Referee: George Clancy

16 April 2011
17:30

Sale Sharks	20–34	London Irish (1 BP)
	Report

Reebok Stadium, Horwich
Attendance: 16,428

17 April 2011
15:00

(1 BP) London Wasps	51–18	Leeds Carnegie
	Report

Adams Park
Attendance: 7,186

=== Rescheduled Game (Round 11) ===
19 April 2011
19:45

Gloucester Rugby	27–15	Northampton Saints
	Report

Kingsholm
Attendance: 15,684

=== Round 21 ===
22 April 2011
15:00

(1 BP) Sale Sharks	24–30	Exeter Chiefs
	Report

Edgeley Park
Attendance: 7,462
Referee: Peter Fitzgibbon

22 April 2011
18:00

Newcastle Falcons	13–24	Leicester Tigers
	Report

Kingston Park
Attendance: 6,470
Referee: Tim Wigglesworth

23 April 2011
15:00

(1 BP) London Irish	20–26	Northampton Saints
	Report

Madejski Stadium
Attendance: 11,860

23 April 2011
17:30

London Wasps	10–43	Bath Rugby (1 BP)
	Report

Twickenham
Attendance: 38,074
Referee: Wayne Barnes

24 April 2011
13:30

(1 BP) Saracens	35–12	Gloucester Rugby
	Report

Vicarage Road
Attendance: 10,439
Referee: Dave Pearson

24 April 2011
15:00

Leeds Carnegie	3–38	Harlequins (1 BP)
	Report

Headingley
Attendance: 5,424
Referee: Martin Fox

=== Rescheduled Game (Round 10) ===
30 April 2011
16:00

(1 BP) Newcastle Falcons	11–14	Bath Rugby
	Report

Kingston Park
Attendance: 5,213

=== Round 22 ===
7 May 2011
15:00

Bath Rugby	42–12	Newcastle Falcons
	Report

Recreation Ground
Attendance: 12,200
Referee: Wayne Barnes

7 May 2011
15:00

Exeter Chiefs	21–8	London Wasps
	Report

Sandy Park
Attendance: 10,522
Referee: Llyr Apgeraint-Roberts

7 May 2011
15:00

Gloucester Rugby	68–17	Sale Sharks
	Report

Kingsholm
Attendance: 14,151

7 May 2011
15:00

Harlequins	13–16	Saracens
	Report

Twickenham Stoop
Attendance: 14,282
Referee: Tim Wigglesworth

7 May 2011
15:00

Leicester Tigers	32–23	London Irish
	Report

Welford Road
Attendance: 24,000
Referee: Greg Garner

7 May 2011
15:00

Northampton Saints	31–24	Leeds Carnegie
	Report

Franklin's Gardens
Attendance: 13,209
Referee: Andrew Small

== Play-offs ==
As in previous seasons, the top four teams in the Premiership table, following the conclusion of the regular season, contest the play-off semi-finals in a 1st vs 4th and 2nd vs 3rd format, with the higher ranking team having home advantage. The two winners of the semi-finals then meet in the Premiership Final at Twickenham on 28 May 2011.

=== Bracket ===
Semi-finals
14 May 2011 – Welford Road
Leicester Tigers	11
Northampton Saints	3
15 May 2011 – Vicarage Road
Saracens	12
Gloucester	10

Final
28 May 2011 – Twickenham
Leicester Tigers	18
Saracens	22

=== Semi-finals ===
14 May 2011
15:15

Leicester Tigers	11–3	Northampton Saints
Try: A. Tuilagi 68' m Pen: Flood (2/4) 37', 60'	Report	Pen: Myler (1/1) 46'

Welford Road
Attendance: 20,137
Referee: Wayne Barnes

Team details

FB	15	(New Zealand) Scott Hamilton
RW	14	(England) Matt Smith		(substituted off) 46'
OC	13	(England) Manu Tuilagi	(yellow card) 31'
IC	12	(England) Anthony Allen
LW	11	(Samoa) Alesana Tuilagi
FH	10	(England) Toby Flood
SH	9	(England) Ben Youngs		(substituted off) 76'
N8	8	(England) Jordan Crane		(substituted off) 64'
OF	7	(New Zealand) Craig Newby (c)
BF	6	(England) Tom Croft
RL	5	(England) George Skivington
LL	4	(Tonga) Steve Mafi		(substituted off) 71'
TP	3	(Italy) Martin Castrogiovanni		(substituted off) 53'
HK	2	(England) George Chuter
LP	1	(Argentina) Marcos Ayerza
Replacements:
HK	16	(England) Rob Hawkins
PR	17	(England) Boris Stankovich
PR	18	(England) Dan Cole		(substituted on) 53'
LK	19	(England) Ed Slater		(substituted on) 71'
N8	20	(England) Thomas Waldrom		(substituted on) 64'
SH	21	(England) James Grindal		(substituted on) 76'
FH	22	(Ireland) Jeremy Staunton
WG	23	(Argentina) Horacio Agulla		(substituted on) 46'
Coach:
(England) Richard Cockerill

FB	15	(England) Ben Foden
RW	14	(England) Chris Ashton	(yellow card) 31'
OC	13	(England) Jon Clarke
IC	12	(Ireland) James Downey
LW	11	(New Zealand) Bruce Reihana
FH	10	(England) Stephen Myler		(substituted off) 76'
SH	9	(England) Lee Dickson
N8	8	(Ireland) Roger Wilson
OF	7	(England) Phil Dowson
BF	6	(England) Calum Clark
RL	5	(England) Christian Day		(substituted off) 70'
LL	4	(England) Courtney Lawes		(substituted off) 71'
TP	3	(South Africa) Brian Mujati
HK	2	(England) Dylan Hartley (c)
LP	1	(Tonga) Soane Tongaʻuiha
Substitutions:
HK	16	(South Africa) Brett Sharman
PR	17	(England) Alex Waller
PR	18	(England) Tom Mercey
LK	19	(New Zealand) Mark Sorenson		(substituted on) 70'
FL	20	(England) Mark Easter		(substituted on) 71'
SH	21	(South Africa) Stuart Commins
FH	22	(England) Shane Geraghty		(substituted on) 76'
CE	23	(Scotland) Joe Ansbro
Coach:
(England) Jim Mallinder

15 May 2011
14:30

Saracens	12–10	Gloucester
Pen: Farrell (4/8) 17', 23', 41', 73'	Report	Try: Robinson 69' c Con: Robinson (1/1) 70'; Pen: Robinson (1/3) 40'

Vicarage Road
Attendance: 12,032
Referee: Andrew Small

Team details

FB	15	(England) Alex Goode
RW	14	(England) David Strettle
OC	13	(United States) Chris Wyles
IC	12	(England) Brad Barritt
LW	11	(England) James Short		(substituted off) 51'
FH	10	(England) Owen Farrell
SH	9	(England) Richard Wigglesworth		(substituted off) 59'
N8	8	(South Africa) Ernst Joubert
OF	7	(Namibia) Jacques Burger
BF	6	(Scotland) Kelly Brown		(substituted off) 62'
RL	5	(England) Mouritz Botha		(substituted off) 50'
LL	4	(England) Steve Borthwick (c)	(yellow card) 63'
TP	3	(Italy) Carlos Nieto		(substituted off) 70'
HK	2	(South Africa) Schalk Brits
LP	1	(England) Matt Stevens
Replacements:
HK	16	(England) Jamie George
PR	17	(Wales) Rhys Gill
PR	18	(South Africa) Petrus du Plessis		(substituted on) 70'
LK	19	(England) Hugh Vyvyan		(substituted on) 50'
FL	20	(England) Andy Saull		(substituted on) 62'
SH	21	(South Africa) Neil de Kock		(substituted on) 59'
CE	22	(Zimbabwe) Nils Mordt
WG	23	(England) Noah Cato		(substituted on) 51'
Coach:
(Ireland) Mark McCall

FB	15	(England) Freddie Burns	(substituted off) 76'
RW	14	(England) Charlie Sharples
OC	13	(New Zealand) Tim Molenaar	(substituted off) 65'
IC	12	(Samoa) Eliota Fuimaono-Sapolu
LW	11	(England) James Simpson-Daniel
FH	10	(Wales) Nicky Robinson
SH	9	(Scotland) Rory Lawson	(substituted off) 62'
N8	8	(England) Luke Narraway
OF	7	(Fiji) Akapusi Qera	(substituted off) 70'
BF	6	(Scotland) Alasdair Strokosch
RL	5	(England) Alex Brown (c)
LL	4	(Scotland) Jim Hamilton	(substituted off) 51'
TP	3	(England) Paul Doran-Jones	(substituted off) 74'
HK	2	(Scotland) Scott Lawson	(substituted off) 76'
LP	1	(England) Nick Wood	(substituted off) 67'
Replacements:
HK	16	(England) Darren Dawidiuk	(substituted on) 76'
PR	17	(Scotland) Alasdair Dickinson	(substituted on) 67'
PR	18	(England) Rupert Harden	(substituted on) 74'
LK	19	(England) Dave Attwood	(substituted on) 51'
FL	20	(England) Brett Deacon	(substituted on) 70'
SH	21	(England) Dave Lewis	(substituted on) 62'
CE	22	(England) Henry Trinder	(substituted on) 65'
WG	23	(England) Tom Voyce	(substituted on) 76'
Coach:
(Scotland) Bryan Redpath

=== Final ===
28 May 2011
15:00

Leicester Tigers	18–22	Saracens
Pen: Flood (6/8) 9', 18', 38', 49', 68', 74'	Report	Try: Short 28' c Con: Farrell (1/1) 29'; Pen: Farrell (5/5) 6', 20', 35', 43', 73'

Twickenham, London
Attendance: 80,016
Referee: Wayne Barnes

Leicester Tigers
Saracens

FB	15	(New Zealand) Scott Hamilton		(substituted off) 74'
RW	14	(Argentina) Horacio Agulla
OC	13	(England) Matt Smith
IC	12	(England) Anthony Allen
LW	11	(Samoa) Alesana Tuilagi
FH	10	(England) Toby Flood
SH	9	(England) Ben Youngs	(yellow card) 5'
N8	8	(England) Jordan Crane		(substituted off) 49'	(substituted on) 64'
OF	7	(New Zealand) Craig Newby (c)		(substituted off) 64'
BF	6	(England) Tom Croft
RL	5	(England) George Skivington
LL	4	(Tonga) Steve Mafi		(substituted off) 71'
TP	3	(Italy) Martin Castrogiovanni		(substituted off) 52'
HK	2	(England) George Chuter		(substituted off) 69'
LP	1	(Argentina) Marcos Ayerza		(substituted off) 77'
Replacements:
HK	16	(England) Rob Hawkins		(substituted on) 69'
PR	17	(England) Boris Stankovich		(substituted on) 77'
PR	18	(England) Dan Cole		(substituted on) 52'
LK	19	(England) Ed Slater		(substituted on) 71'
N8	20	(England) Thomas Waldrom		(substituted on) 49'	(substituted off) 64'
SH	21	(England) James Grindal
FH	22	(Ireland) Jeremy Staunton
CE	23	(England) Billy Twelvetrees		(substituted on) 74'
Coach:
(England) Richard Cockerill

FB	15	(England) Alex Goode
RW	14	(England) David Strettle
OC	13	(United States) Chris Wyles
IC	12	(England) Brad Barritt
LW	11	(England) James Short
FH	10	(England) Owen Farrell
SH	9	(South Africa) Neil de Kock	(substituted off) 49'
N8	8	(South Africa) Ernst Joubert	30' to 33'
OF	7	(Namibia) Jacques Burger
BF	6	(Scotland) Kelly Brown
RL	5	(England) Mouritz Botha	(substituted off) 55'
LL	4	(England) Steve Borthwick (c)
TP	3	(Italy) Carlos Nieto	(substituted off) 59'
HK	2	(South Africa) Schalk Brits
LP	1	(England) Matt Stevens	(substituted off) 51'
Replacements:
HK	16	(England) Jamie George
PR	17	(Wales) Rhys Gill	(substituted on) 51'
PR	18	(South Africa) Petrus du Plessis	(substituted on) 59'
LK	19	(England) Hugh Vyvyan	(substituted on) 55'
FL	20	(England) Andy Saull	(substituted on) 30'	(substituted off) 33'
SH	21	(England) Richard Wigglesworth	(substituted on) 49'
CE	22	(Zimbabwe) Nils Mordt
WG	23	(England) Noah Cato
Coach:
(Ireland) Mark McCall

Man of the Match:
(South Africa) Schalk Brits (Saracens)

== Leading scorers ==
Note: Flags indicate national union as has been defined under WR eligibility rules. Players may hold more than one non-WR nationality.

=== Most points ===
Rank	Player	Club	Points
1	(New Zealand) Jimmy Gopperth	Newcastle Falcons	230
2	(New Zealand) Nick Evans	Harlequins	206
2	(England) Dave Walder	London Wasps	206
4	(England) Stephen Myler	Northampton Saints	181
5	(Ireland) Gareth Steenson	Exeter Chiefs	177
6	(England) Charlie Hodgson	Sale Sharks	165
7	(England) Ryan Lamb	London Irish	157
8	(Wales) Nicky Robinson	Gloucester	155
9	(England) Alex Goode	Saracens	144
10	(England) Olly Barkley	Bath	142

=== Most tries ===
Rank	Player	Club	Tries
1	(Samoa) Alesana Tuilagi	Leicester Tigers	13
2	(England) Chris Ashton	Northampton Saints	10
2	(England) Topsy Ojo	London Irish	10
4	(England) Matt Banahan	Bath Rugby	8
5	(New Zealand) Scott Hamilton	Leicester Tigers	7
5	(England) Charlie Sharples	Gloucester Rugby	7
5	(England) Manu Tuilagi	Leicester Tigers	7
8	12 players tied		6
