= Paul Hill (rugby union) =

England international rugby union footballer

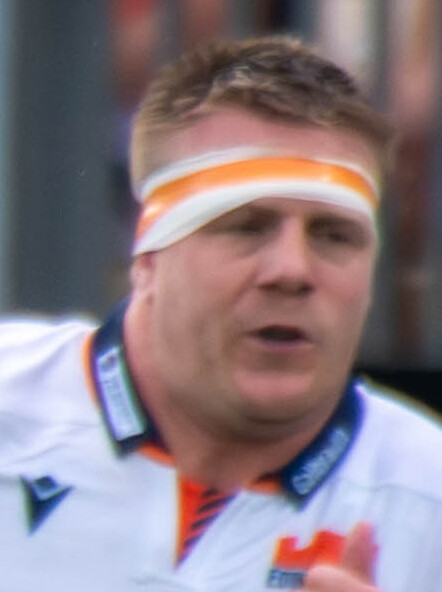
- Born: Paul Oliver Hill; 2 March 1995 (age 31) Aschaffenburg, Germany
- Height: 1.88 m (6 ft 2 in)
- Weight: 123 kg (271 lb; 19 st 5 lb)
- School: Prince Henry's Grammar School, Otley

Rugby union career
- Position: Tighthead Prop
Amateur team(s)
Years	Team	Apps	(Points)
- Doncaster
Senior career
Years	Team	Apps	(Points)
2013–2014	Otley	19	(20)
2014	Darlington Mowden Park	4	(0)
2014–2015	Yorkshire Carnegie	17	(10)
2015–2024	Northampton Saints	187	(20)
2024–	Edinburgh Rugby	6	(0)
- Correct as of 21 July 2024
International career
Years	Team	Apps	(Points)
- England U16
2013	England U18	8	(5)
2014–2015	England U20	19	(5)
2016–2021	England	6	(0)
- Correct as of 10 July 2021

Paul Oliver Hill (born 2 March 1995) is a professional rugby union footballer who plays at prop for United Rugby Championship club Edinburgh Rugby.

== Club career ==
Although born in Germany, Hill was raised in Doncaster and played his junior rugby at Doncaster Knights, before moving to Yorkshire Carnegie's academy, making his senior debut in 2014.

On 17 April 2015 Hill joined Northampton Saints to compete in the Premiership from the 2015–16 season. He started for the Northampton side that defeated Saracens in the final of the 2018–19 Premiership Rugby Cup.

After almost a decade at Northampton it was announced that Hill would join Edinburgh Rugby for the 2024–25 United Rugby Championship.

== International career ==
Hill has represented England at age ranges from U16 to U20 levels. He started for the England U20 that defeated South Africa in the final of the 2014 IRB Junior World Championship at Eden Park. Hill scored a try against Scotland during the 2015 Six Nations Under 20s Championship which England won. Later that year he started for the side that lost to New Zealand in the final of the 2015 World Rugby Under 20 Championship.

On 13 January 2016 Hill received his first call-up to the senior England squad by new coach Eddie Jones for the 2016 Six Nations Championship. Hill made his Test debut when he came on as a replacement for Dan Cole against Italy on 14 February 2016. This was his only appearance during the tournament which saw England complete a Grand Slam.

In the summer of 2016 Hill won his second cap against Wales and then subsequently featured off the bench in all three tests of their tour of Australia which saw England complete a series whitewash. The following year saw him selected for the 2017 tour of Argentina however a neck injury sustained whilst representing his club forced him to withdraw.

In July 2021 after a five year absence Hill returned to the England team for a game against Canada. This was ultimately his sixth and last appearance for England.

== Honours ==
England

- 1× Six Nations Championship: 2016

Northampton

- 1× Premiership Rugby Cup: 2018–19
