= Jamie George =

English rugby union player (born 1990)

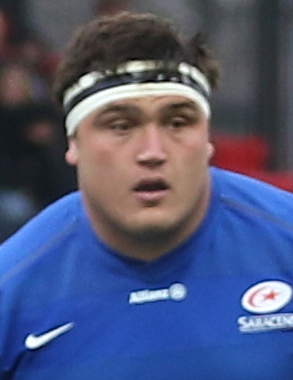
- George representing Saracens in 2015
- Full name: Jamie Edward George
- Born: 20 October 1990 (age 36) Welwyn Garden City, England
- Height: 1.78 m (5 ft 10 in)
- Weight: 107 kg (236 lb; 16 st 12 lb)
- School: Haileybury College

Rugby union career
- Position: Hooker
- Current team: Saracens
Senior career
Years	Team	Apps	(Points)
2009–	Saracens	329	(350)
- Correct as of 31 October 2026
International career
Years	Team	Apps	(Points)
2008	England U18	4	(15)
2009–2010	England U20	20	(5)
2015–	England	114	(95)
2017, 2021, 2025	British & Irish Lions	3	(0)
- Correct as of 8 November 2026
Medal record
Men's Rugby union
Representing England
Rugby World Cup
Silver medal – second place	2019 Japan	Squad
Bronze medal – third place	2023 France	Squad

Jamie Edward George (born 20 October 1990) is an English professional rugby union player who plays as a hooker for Premiership Rugby club Saracens and the England national team.

== Early life ==
George played for local team Hertford RFC in his youth, until he was asked to join the Saracens Academy.

George was educated at Haileybury and Imperial Service College and captained the Haileybury 1st XV for two years, in Lower Sixth and Upper Sixth, while also being a regular for the 1st XV in Y11.

== Club career ==
George has played for Saracens since 2009 after training in the Saracens Academy from the age of 14. He had a short loan spell at Southend Saxons in the lower tiers of English rugby in 2008–09, however quickly caught the attention of Bobby Walsh in the Saracens management team to return the following season.

=== 2009–14 ===
In November 2009, George made his professional club debut for the Saracens first team against Northampton Saints in the Anglo-Welsh Cup. However this was the only appearance he was to make that season. He continued his development playing for the Saracens Storm in the A league.

The 2010–11 season was George's first season for the Saracens first team. He played most of the season as an understudy to Schalk Brits who he described as "one of the most talented blokes I’ve ever met in my life". In the season he made 20 appearances and scored two tries, helping Saracens to secure a home semi-final in the Premiership. He was an unused substitute in the final as Saracens defeated Leicester Tigers to win their first ever league title.

In May 2014, George was a second-half replacement in the 2014 Heineken Cup final as they finished runners up to Toulon and the following weekend saw Saracens lose against Northampton Saints in the Premiership final.

=== 2014–18 ===
George started the 2015 Premiership final, and was the centre of added pressure and attention due to his promotion to the England squad. George responded well and starred during the match against Bath, running in one try from over 30-metres out, and passing the ball to Chris Wyles for his try.

On 14 May 2016, George was a second-half replacement in the 2016 European Champions Cup final, as Saracens beat Racing 92 to become champions of Europe for the first time. Later that month they defeated Exeter Chiefs to complete their first ever domestic and European double.

In the 2016–17 season, George started for the side that defeated ASM Clermont Auvergne in the 2017 European Rugby Champions Cup final at Murrayfield to retain their European title. The following season saw George win his fourth league title with Saracens as they were victorious against Exeter in the Premiership final.

=== 2018–22 ===
George started for the team as they repeated their domestic and European double achievement of 2015–2016. They beat Leinster in the 2019 European Rugby Champions Cup final at St James' Park to become European champions for the third time in four years. He then scored two tries in the Premiership final as Saracens defeated Exeter to retain their league title.

In July 2020, George signed a new three-year contract with Saracens. However, this deal ensured that he would play in the RFU Championship the following season, after his club were relegated following breach of salary cap.

George scored a try in the 2020–21 RFU Championship play-off final as Saracens defeated Ealing Trailfinders to gain promotion and an immediate return to the Premiership.

=== 2022–present ===
In their first campaign back in the top flight, George started the 2022 Premiership final as Saracens were defeated by Leicester to finish runners up. The following season saw George win his sixth Premiership title starting in the 2023 final as Saracens beat Sale Sharks to become league champions again.

== International career ==
=== England ===
George started for the England side that finished runners up to New Zealand at the 2009 IRB Junior World Championship. He scored a try against Wales during the 2010 Six Nations Under 20s Championship and was a member of the squad that finished fourth at the 2010 IRB Junior World Championship. In January 2014, George represented England A against Ireland Wolfhounds and Scotland A.

On 29 May 2015, George was promoted to England's extended 50-man training squad for the 2015 Rugby World Cup. He had replaced veteran Dylan Hartley in the squad after Hartley was suspended for head-butting George in a Saracens vs Northampton Saints fixture. On 22 August 2015 George made his Test debut replacing Tom Youngs in a World Cup warm Up fixture against France. Five days after making his debut, he was included in coach Stuart Lancaster's 31-man squad for the 2015 Rugby World Cup. His only appearance during the tournament came in their final pool fixture against Uruguay as the hosts failed to reach the knockout phase.

In January 2016, George was announced in new coach Eddie Jones' first senior England squad for the 2016 Six Nations Championship and on 6 February 2016, made his first tournament appearance as a replacement for captain Hartley in their opening round 15–9 victory against Scotland. England went on to complete the Grand Slam. Later that year, George scored his first international try in the final test of their summer tour of Australia to complete a series whitewash. England retained their title during the 2017 Six Nations Championship, missing out on a consecutive grand slam with defeat in the final game away to Ireland which also brought an end to a record equalling eighteen successive Test victories.

George was included in the squad for the 2019 Rugby World Cup and scored a try in their opening pool fixture against Tonga. He started all three knockout games against Australia in the quarter-final, victory over New Zealand in the semi-final and defeat to South Africa in the final as England finished runners up.

On 31 October 2020, George scored a try on his 50th cap as England defeated Italy to win the 2020 Six Nations Championship. The following month saw him become the first hooker to score a hat-trick for the England men's team in their opening fixture of the Autumn Nations Cup against Georgia. He also started in the final of that competition as England defeated France after extra-time to win the tournament.

George scored tries against Italy and Ireland during the 2023 Six Nations. Later that year, he was selected for the 2023 Rugby World Cup and played every minute of their quarter-final victory over Fiji and semi-final elimination against champions South Africa. George also featured in their last fixture of the tournament as England defeated Argentina to finish third and claim a bronze medal.

Ahead of the 2024 Six Nations, George was made England captain, replacing Owen Farrell. In November 2024, he earned his 97th cap for England, captaining the side and scoring two tries in a 59–14 win over Japan during their final fixture of the 2024 Autumn Nations Series. This equalled the all-time record for England caps by a hooker, pulling level with former teammate Dylan Hartley.

In January 2025, although George was selected for the senior training squad, he relinquished the England captaincy to Saracens teammate Maro Itoje for the 2025 Six Nations. In February 2025, he was named on the bench for the second round fixture of the tournament against France. This was the first test match he had been involved in since relinquishing the captaincy. He came on as a substitute as England won 26–25 in the final minute of the game. In the process, he became the most capped England hooker of all time overtaking Dylan Hartley. George made his 100th appearance for England in the penultimate round against Italy.

=== British and Irish Lions ===
George was selected as a member of the 2017 British & Irish Lions squad. George featured in six matches on the tour including against the Māori All Blacks. The opening test against New Zealand was his first international start having previously played all seventeen of his England caps coming off the bench, a world record for most tests without a start. George played the full 80 minutes in the second test, setting up Conor Murray's winning try. He started the draw in the final match as the series ended level.

George was also picked by coach Warren Gatland for the 2021 British & Irish Lions tour to South Africa. He played in the opening game against Japan and three more tour matches but did not participate in the Test series.

In July 2025, George was called up to the British and Irish Lions squad touring Australia by coach Andy Farrell following an injury to Luke Cowan-Dickie. George did not participate in the Test series and made his last appearance for the Lions starting in a tour fixture against First Nations & Pasifika XV.

== Career statistics ==
=== List of international tries ===
as of 11 July 2026

No.	Date	Venue	Opponent	Score	Result	Competition	Ref.
1	25 June 2016	Sydney Football Stadium, Sydney, Australia	Australia	36–32	44–40	2016 England tour of Australia	
2	9 March 2019	Twickenham Stadium, London, England	Italy	5–0	57–14	2019 Six Nations Championship	
3	22 September 2019	Sapporo Dome, Sapporo, Japan	Tonga	26–3	35–3	2019 Rugby World Cup	
4	31 October 2020	Stadio Olimpico, Rome, Italy	Italy	22–5	34–5	2020 Six Nations Championship	
5	14 November 2020	Twickenham Stadium, London, England	Georgia	12–0	40–0	Autumn Nations Cup	
6	14 November 2020	Twickenham Stadium, London, England	Georgia	19–0	40–0	Autumn Nations Cup	
7	14 November 2020	Twickenham Stadium, London, England	Georgia	31–0	40–0	Autumn Nations Cup	
8	6 November 2021	Twickenham Stadium, London, England	Tonga	10–0	69–3	2021 end-of-year internationals	
9	6 November 2021	Twickenham Stadium, London, England	Tonga	46–3	69–3	2021 end-of-year internationals	
10	13 February 2022	Stadio Olimpico, Rome, Italy	Italy	12–0	33–0	2022 Six Nations Championship	
11	13 February 2022	Stadio Olimpico, Rome, Italy	Italy	19–0	33–0	2022 Six Nations Championship	
12	12 February 2023	Twickenham Stadium, London, England	Italy	19–0	31–14	2023 Six Nations Championship	
13	18 March 2023	Aviva Stadium, Dublin, Ireland	Ireland	14–24	16–29	2023 Six Nations Championship	
14	24 November 2024	Twickenham Stadium, London, England	Japan	19–0	59–14	2024 end-of-year internationals	
15	24 November 2024	Twickenham Stadium, London, England	Japan	26–0	59–14	2024 end-of-year internationals	
16	8 November 2025	Twickenham Stadium, London, England	Fiji	26–18	38–18	2025 end-of-year internationals	
17	11 July 2026	Hill Dickinson Stadium, Liverpool, England	Fiji	12–0	73–8	2026 Nations Championship	
18	8 November 2026	Twickenham Stadium, London, England	Australia	5–0	45–22	2026 Nations Championship	

== Honours ==
England

- 3× Six Nations Championship winner: 2016, 2017, 2020
- 1× Grand Slam winner: 2016
- 1× Autumn Nations Cup winner: 2020
- 1× Rugby World Cup runner-up: 2019
- 2× Six Nations Championship runner-up: 2019, 2025
- 1× Rugby World Cup bronze medallist: 2023

Saracens

- 3× European Rugby Champions Cup winner: 2015–16, 2016–17, 2018–19
- 6× Premiership Rugby winner: 2010–11, 2014–15, 2015–16, 2017–18, 2018–19, 2022–23
- 1× RFU Championship winner: 2020–21
- 1× European Rugby Champions Cup runner-up: 2013–14
- 2× Premiership Rugby runner-up: 2013–14, 2021–22

Individual

- 3× Premiership Rugby Team of the Season: 2014–15, 2016–17, 2018–19
- 2× Premiership Rugby Community Player of the Season: 2012–13, 2014–15

Sporting positions
Preceded by Owen Farrell	England captain Feb – Nov 2024	Succeeded by Maro Itoje
