= Bruff R.F.C. =

Irish rugby union club, based in Bruff, Co.Limerick

Coordinates: 52.4723°N 8.5069°W

Bruff RFC
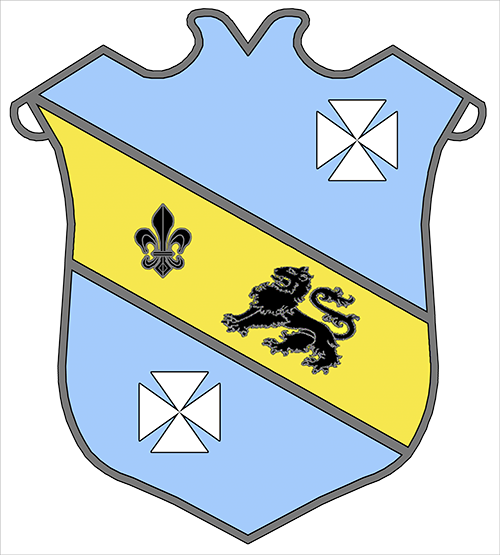
- Full name: Bruff Rugby Football Club
- Union: (Ireland) IRFU
- Branch: Munster
- Founded: January 1970; 56 years ago
- Region: Limerick
- Ground(s): Kilballyowen Park, Bruff (Capacity: ~2000)
- Chairman: PJ Clogan
- President: Barbara O'Brien
- Coach: Andrew O'Byrne
- Captain(s): Cillian Rea (M), Marie-Louise Ryan (W)
- Most caps: John Hayes (Ireland)
- Top test scorer: John Hayes (Ireland)
- League: A.I.L. Div. 2C
- 2025–26: 6th.
Team kit

First match
- 1969

Official website
- www.bruffrfc.com

Bruff Rugby Football Club is a rugby union club in County Limerick, Ireland. As at December 2025 it was playing in Division 2C of the All-Ireland League. The club plays at home in Kilballyowen Park, near the town of Bruff in County Limerick. As at the 2025/26 season they were fielding 18 rugby teams at the club including 4 men's adult squads, Adult Women's, girls' youth, minis and boys' youth rugby teams ranging in age from under-7 to under-18.

== History ==
The club was set up in late 1969 - early 1970 by two G.A.A. players, Willie Conway and Nicholas Cooke.

The club's first home game was played in a field to the rear of the church in the village of Bruff and was watched by most of the village occupants.

Early in the 1970s the club president, Lt. Col. Gerald Vigors De Courcy O'Grady MC (The O'Grady), donated a gate-lodge from his estate as a dressing room and sold a pitch to the club for the nominal sum of £1.

The club grounds at Kilballyowen Park now include an area of approximately 13 acres (53,000 m^{2}), with 2 full pitches and 2 Training pitches, all of them floodlit. The club pavilion has a bar, a dance area with full lighting, kitchen facilities, gymnasium, president's room, office and a newly updated dressing room complex containing 10 dressing rooms, 4 shower blocks, medical room, recovery room, inclusive and accessible dressing rooms, 2 referee rooms, storage facilities and a kit shop.

In the mid- to late 1980s the club underwent a major revamp of its under-age structure with the creation of a specific under-age committee for the purpose of promotion of the game of Rugby Football with the youth within the catchment area of the club. This very quickly resulted in a major increase of player numbers and a consequential improvement in results from the Community games level upwards with the club regularly winning under-age competitions in Munster. This was followed by Irish competition wins including U16, and U18 All-Ireland cups and culminating in the winning of the U20 AIL competition in the 2000-2001 season. This under-age success had a knock on effect with the Adult teams in the club and the club has been awarded both Senior club of the year (2010–11) and Youth club of the year (2011–12) awards by the Munster Branch for its high standards of coaching and extremely high number of qualified coaches and Referees at every level within the club.(IRB Elite International Referee George Clancy is a former player and long-standing referee from the club). The club was awarded IRFU Rugby Faculty status in November 2013 under the Irish Rugby Faculty program.

Promotion up the ranks of the Munster Junior club divisions during the late 1990s and early 2000s seasons quickly followed hand in hand with under-age success and finally, at the third attempt in four years, the club won the AIL Provincial Round Robin series in 2003-04 to gain promotion to the All Ireland League.

The gaining of senior club status resulted in the return of many players to the club, most notably Munster, Ireland and British & Irish Lions Player John Hayes, and in the 2006-2007 season former Shannon Captain Eoin Cahill returned to his home club as Player/Backs Coach and the return of Irish Club International captain Peter Malone for the beginning of the 2008-2009 season as forwards player/coach.

Although narrowly failing to gain promotion in the 2006-2007 season having come third in the league stage of the competition, the club was crowned Division 3 Champions following their semi-final play-off defeat of Ballynahinch and defeat of Wanderers in the AIL division 3 Final (Both opposing teams had gained promotion during the league phase.)

The following Season (2007–08) saw another meteoric rise in the fortunes of the club, breaking many AIL records along the way. The club completed the league stage without a loss, and according to the IRFU website did so with the lowest total score against in the history of the AIL (A total of 56 points against in 15 games). They gained promotion to Division 2 by coming first in the League phase, having maintained an unbeaten run of 20 league games right up to the final, but lost the Final by 32 points to 23 to their opponents Instonians from Belfast. Instonians had come second during the league phase and had been promoted to Division 2 along with them.

The club played in Division 1B of the AIB League having graduated from Junior club to Senior club status in the 2003-2004 season, and having been promoted to Division 2 following the 2007-08 season. They gained promotion to Division 1 after finishing in second place in the Division 2 League Table during the 2009-2010 season. Following a Semi-final win over Terenure they met Lansdowne RFC in the final playoff on Saturday 8 May in an exciting final, losing 17 points to 10.

In their first season in Division 1b (2010-2011), Bruff won the Munster Senior Cup for the first time in their 40-year history. The path to the final included wins over Shannon and Cork Constitution with a walkover in the Semi-Final by Highfield. They beat Garryowen in the final with a 23 points to 19 scoreline. They continued this cup run into the Bateman cup semi-final and came back from 15 points down with 13 minutes on the clock to Beat UCD and gain a Bateman Cup final place for the first time. They met Ulster Cup Winners Dungannon (also in Division 1B that season). The final was the third time that the teams had met that season and each finalist had won at home in the two games played during the All Ireland League. Bruff beat Dungannon in the final winning by a 24 points to 18 scoreline.

Despite this fabulous cup run, Bruff ended the All -Ireland League in the 2010-11 season at the bottom of Division 1B, having to fight a relegation playoff against the 5th team in Division two to maintain their place in division 1B. Divisions 1A and 1B were changed from two 8 team divisions to two 10 team divisions with the playoff being fought between the bottom team in division 1b and the fifth team in division 2. Bruff won the playoff against Bective Rangers with a 25 points to 12 win to maintain their status as a division 1B club. The following 2011-12 season again saw an extremely tight league in division 1b with 6 of the 10 clubs moving league places on the final day, Bruff were involved in yet another playoff on the last day against Buccaneers RFC, managing to win at home and maintain 1b status.

The club was relegated to Division 2a of the All-Ireland League at the end of the 2012-13 Season. It followed a period of mass emigration in the province of Munster and a mass exodus of player numbers from the club. Of the panel of 22 Bruff players listed for the final of the Bateman cup in 2011, 14 had emigrated, 2 retired from Rugby and 2 had moved to other clubs. The Irish Daily Mail dedicated a full centre page spread during this time discussing the effect that the recession had had on the club and the area.

The following season the freefall continued with relegation to division 2c where the club currently stands (2024–25). The Team is currently coached by Andrew O' Byrne. Club Captain this year is Cillian Rea.

== Notable former players ==
(British & Irish Lions) British and Irish Lions

- John Hayes

Ireland

- John Hayes

Munster players

- John Hayes
- Tommy Hayes
- Stephen Keogh
- Jake O'Riordan
- Jamie Walsh

International referee

- George Clancy

== The Thirds ==
Bruff RFC Junior 2 (The Thirds) are the third choice Adult team for Bruff R.F.C. The team are currently competing in the North Munster Gleeson League competition in Section B. The Thirds are currently coached by Ger Collins.

In the 2007-2008 season The Thirds finished top of Section B in the Gleeson League but unfortunately suffered a 23-3 defeat at home to Garryowen Football Club They finished the season on a high, winning the McInerney Cup eliminating St. Senan's and Thomond RFC before edging Old Crescent 20-13 in a well-fought final at Kilballyowen Park.

The 2008-2009 season started well for The Thirds, winning 3 challenge matches and their first Gleeson League match (while only conceding 10 points in the 4 games). The season started to run downhill after that with defeats to Cashel, Clonmel, Shannon and Kilfeacle, with a draw and a 1-point victory against UL Bohs in between. Bruff were unable to successfully defend the McInerney Cup losing to Garryowen in Annacotty. Bruff had knocked out Old Crescent, St. Senans and Shannon on their way to the final. Bruff crashed out in the Semi-finals of the Webb Cup to Cashel in a high-scoring match. Richie McAuliffe finished as top points scorer with 97points, despite missing a penalty in the final game of the season. Stephen O'Shea scored 3 tries also.

The Thirds' Competitive Record 2008-2009 Played 12, Won 7, Lost 5, Points Scored 188 (20Tries), Points Conceded 215. The Thirds' Point Scorers 2008-2009 Season (League And Cup Games Only):

- Richie McAuliffe 97points (3tries),
- Steve O'Shea 15points (3tries),
- Eoghan O'Shea 11points (1try),
- Ronan Kirby 10points (2tries)
- Paul O'Shea 10points (2tries),
- Peter Twomey 10points (2tries),
- Joe Power 10points (2tries),
- Mike Fitzgerald 10points (2tries),
- Des Power 5points,
- Ger Cronin 5points,
- Niall McCarthy 5points,

== Honours ==
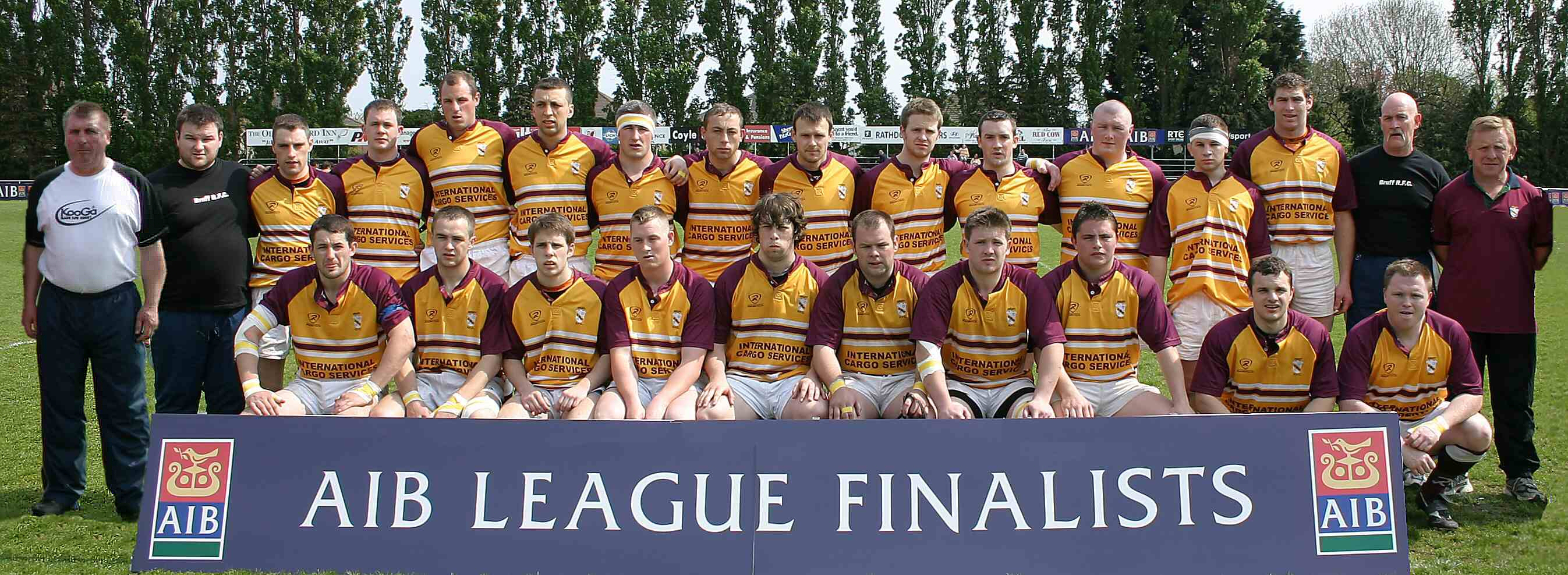
Div. 3 Winners, 2007

- All-Ireland Cup: 2010–11
- Munster Senior Cup: 2010–11
- Munster Junior Cup (Runner-up): 2004
- Munster Junior League: 1999–2000, 2002–03, 2003–04

== Gallery ==
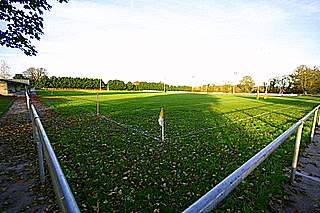
Main Pitch

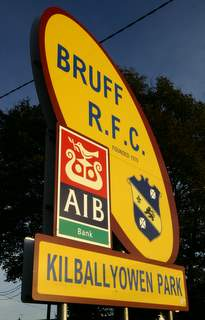
Club Entrance

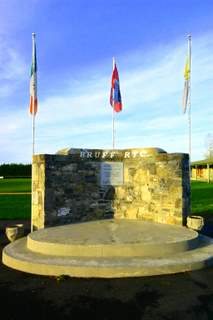
Club Plaque

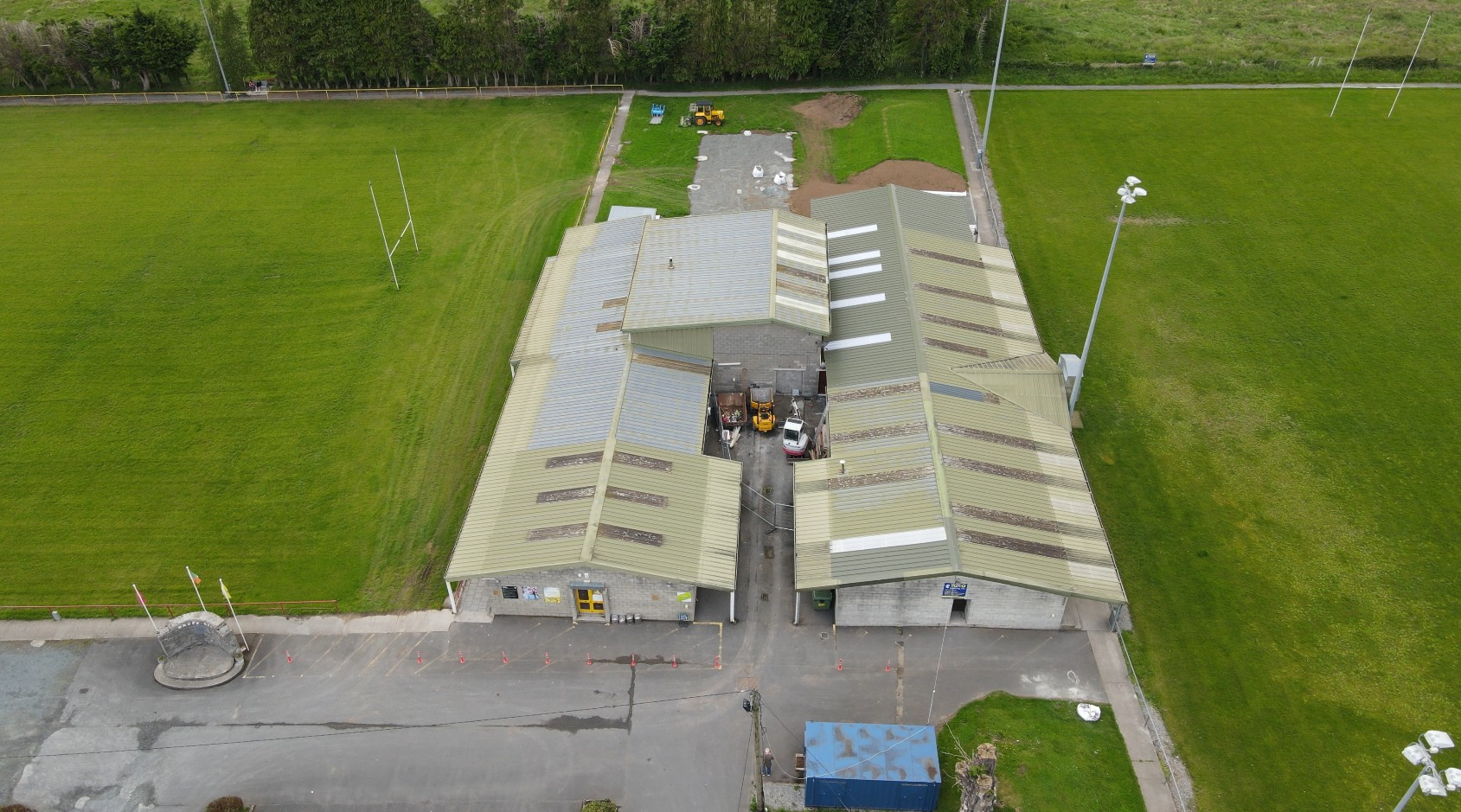
Bruff RFC Overhead Photo

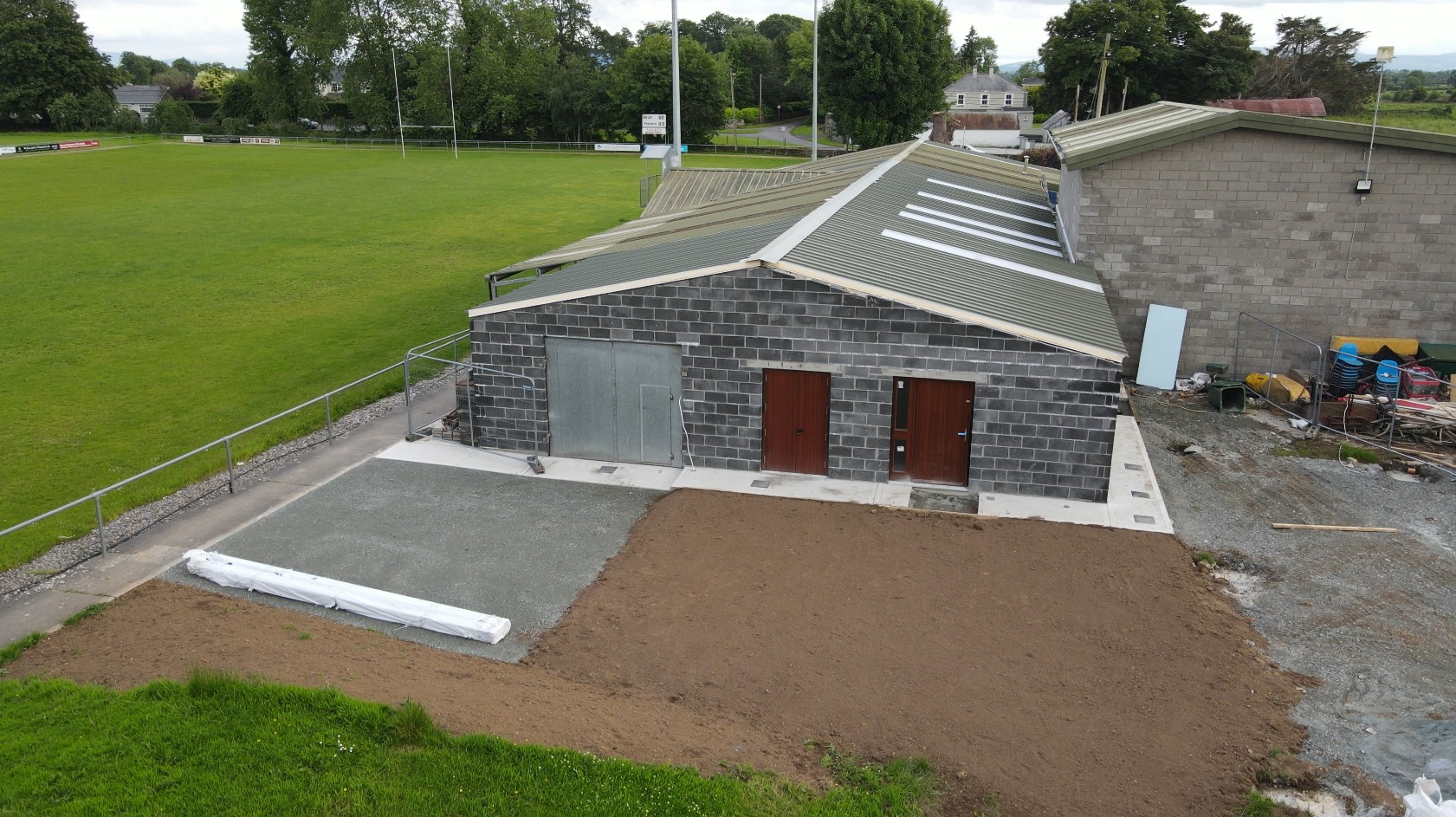
Bruff RFC Overhead Photo 2

== See also ==
- Bruff GAA, Gaelic games club
