= 2016 England rugby union tour of Australia =

- Coach: Eddie Jones
- Tour captain: Dylan Hartley
- Top test point scorer: Owen Farrell (66)
- Top test try scorer: 9 players with 1 try
Summary
P	W	D	L
Total
3	3	0	0
Test match
3	3	0	0
Opponent
P	W	D	L
Australia
3	3	0	0

Tour chronology
- ← New Zealand 2014 Argentina 2017 →

In June 2016, England played a three-test series against Australia as part of the 2016 mid-year rugby union tests. They played the Wallabies across the three weeks of the June International window, 11 June–25 June, and contested the Cook Cup, which England had previously won eight times to Australia's twelve. The series was part of the fourth year of the global rugby calendar established by the International Rugby Board, which runs through to 2019.

England won all three matches, the first time they had won a test series in Australia. After defeating the hosts in the second match, England retained the Cook Cup and achieved second place in the World Rugby Rankings, while Australia dropped to fourth. Australia had not been "whitewashed" in a home series since losing all three tests to South Africa in 1971.

After the third test, two days after the United Kingdom had voted to leave the European Union, The Courier-Mail joked that a second continent now hated England as a result of the tour.

== Fixtures ==
Date	Venue	Home	Score	Away
11 June 2016	Suncorp Stadium, Brisbane	Australia	28–39	England
18 June 2016	AAMI Park, Melbourne	Australia	7–23	England
25 June 2016	Allianz Stadium, Sydney	Australia	40–44	England

== Squads ==
Note: Ages, caps and clubs are as per 11 June, the first test match of the tour.

=== England ===
On 22 May, Eddie Jones named a 32-man squad for England's tour of Australia. An additional 5 players (Dave Attwood, Luther Burrell, Ollie Devoto, Matt Kvesic, Tommy Taylor) were also named ahead of the test match against Wales on 29 May, the day after the Aviva Premiership final between Saracens and Exeter Chiefs. Ben Te'o, whose mother is English, was named in the squad, despite playing for Irish province Leinster, since he will be moving to Worcester Warriors for the 2016/17 season, making him eligible for selection.

On 30 May, Luther Burrell replaced Manu Tuilagi in the touring squad after Tuilagi withdrew from the squad due to injury.

Coaching team:

- Head coach: (Australia) Eddie Jones
- Defence coach: (England) Paul Gustard
- Attack/Skills coach: (Australia) Glen Ella
- Forwards coach: (England) Steve Borthwick

Player	Position	Date of birth (age)	Caps	Club/province
Luke Cowan-Dickie	Hooker	20 June 1993 (aged 22)	3	(England) Exeter Chiefs
Jamie George	Hooker	20 June 1990 (aged 25)	6	(England) Saracens
Dylan Hartley (c)	Hooker	24 March 1986 (aged 30)	72	(England) Northampton Saints
Dan Cole	Prop	9 May 1987 (aged 29)	62	(England) Leicester Tigers
Ellis Genge	Prop	16 February 1995 (aged 21)	1	(England) Leicester Tigers
Paul Hill	Prop	2 March 1995 (aged 21)	2	(England) Northampton Saints
Matt Mullan	Prop	23 February 1987 (aged 29)	10	(England) Wasps
Kyle Sinckler	Prop	10 March 1993 (aged 23)	0	(England) Harlequins
Mako Vunipola	Prop	13 January 1991 (aged 25)	32	(England) Saracens
Maro Itoje	Lock	28 October 1994 (aged 21)	4	(England) Saracens
George Kruis	Lock	22 February 1990 (aged 26)	15	(England) Saracens
Joe Launchbury	Lock	12 April 1991 (aged 25)	32	(England) Wasps
Courtney Lawes	Lock	23 February 1989 (aged 27)	46	(England) Northampton Saints
Jack Clifford (rugby)	Flanker	22 February 1993 (aged 23)	6	(England) Harlequins
Teimana Harrison	Flanker	5 September 1992 (aged 23)	1	(England) Northampton Saints
James Haskell	Flanker	2 April 1985 (aged 31)	68	(England) Wasps
Chris Robshaw	Flanker	4 June 1986 (aged 30)	48	(England) Harlequins
Billy Vunipola	Number 8	3 November 1992 (aged 23)	26	(England) Saracens
Danny Care	Scrum-half	2 January 1987 (aged 29)	59	(England) Harlequins
Ben Youngs	Scrum-half	5 September 1989 (aged 26)	58	(England) Leicester Tigers
Owen Farrell	Fly-half	24 September 1991 (aged 24)	40	(England) Saracens
George Ford	Fly-half	16 March 1993 (aged 23)	23	(England) Bath
Luther Burrell	Centre	6 December 1987 (aged 28)	14	(England) Northampton Saints
Elliot Daly	Centre	8 October 1992 (aged 23)	3	(England) Wasps
Jonathan Joseph	Centre	21 May 1991 (aged 25)	22	(England) Bath
Henry Slade	Centre	19 March 1993 (aged 23)	2	(England) Exeter Chiefs
Ben Te'o	Centre	27 January 1987 (aged 29)	0	(England) Worcester Warriors
Jack Nowell	Wing	11 April 1993 (aged 23)	15	(England) Exeter Chiefs
Anthony Watson	Wing	26 February 1994 (aged 22)	21	(England) Bath
Marland Yarde	Wing	20 April 1992 (aged 24)	8	(England) Harlequins
Mike Brown	Fullback	4 September 1985 (aged 30)	49	(England) Harlequins
Alex Goode	Fullback	7 May 1988 (aged 28)	20	(England) Saracens

=== Australia ===
On 26 May 2016, Michael Cheika named a 39-man extended squad for their June test series against England.

On 30 May 2016, Reece Hodge was called up to the squad to replace the injured Mike Harris.

On 3 June 2016, Michael Cheika named a final 33-man squad for the test series, with Adam Coleman, Liam Gill, James Hanson, Leroy Houston, Eto Nabuli and Joe Powell missing out on the final cut.

On 12 June, Matt To'omua joined the squad as un-listed member of the squad after recovering from his knee surgery. Liam Gill (rugby)|Liam Gill also joined the squad after David Pocock was ruled out of the rest of the series.

On 20 June, Ben McCalman was ruled out of the last test of the series due to injury and was replaced by Leroy Houston in the squad.

On 23 June, Adam Coleman was named in an extended match-day 23 for the final test, despite not being in the initial 33-man squad.

Coaching team:

- Head coach: (Australia) Michael Cheika
- Defence coach: (Australia) Nathan Grey
- Forwards coach: (Argentina) Mario Ledesma
- Backs/Attack coach: (Australia) Stephen Larkham

Player	Position	Date of birth (age)	Caps	Club/province
Stephen Moore	Hooker	20 January 1983 (aged 33)	102	(Australia) Brumbies
Tatafu Polota-Nau	Hooker	26 July 1985 (aged 30)	61	(Australia) Waratahs
Allan Alaalatoa	Prop	28 January 1994 (aged 22)	0	(Australia) Brumbies
Greg Holmes	Prop	11 June 1983 (aged 33)	24	(Australia) Queensland Reds
Sekope Kepu	Prop	5 February 1986 (aged 30)	63	(France) Bordeaux Bègles
Scott Sio	Prop	16 October 1991 (aged 24)	16	(Australia) Brumbies
James Slipper	Prop	6 June 1989 (aged 27)	74	(Australia) Queensland Reds
Toby Smith	Prop	10 October 1988 (aged 27)	3	(Australia) Melbourne Rebels
Rory Arnold	Lock	1 July 1990 (aged 25)	0	(Australia) Brumbies
Sam Carter	Lock	10 September 1989 (aged 26)	12	(Australia) Brumbies
Adam Coleman	Lock	7 October 1991 (aged 24)	0	(Australia) Western Force
James Horwill	Lock	29 May 1985 (aged 31)	61	(England) Harlequins
Dean Mumm	Lock	5 March 1984 (aged 32)	44	(Australia) Waratahs
Rob Simmons	Lock	19 April 1989 (aged 27)	60	(Australia) Queensland Reds
Will Skelton	Lock	3 May 1992 (aged 24)	14	(Australia) Waratahs
Scott Fardy	Flanker	5 July 1984 (aged 31)	30	(Australia) Brumbies
Liam Gill	Flanker	8 June 1992 (aged 24)	15	(Australia) Queensland Reds
Michael Hooper	Flanker	29 October 1991 (aged 24)	51	(Australia) Waratahs
Sean McMahon	Flanker	18 June 1994 (aged 21)	6	(Australia) Melbourne Rebels
David Pocock	Flanker	23 April 1988 (aged 28)	55	(Australia) Brumbies
Leroy Houston	Number 8	10 November 1986 (aged 29)	0	(Australia) Queensland Reds
Ben McCalman	Number 8	18 March 1988 (aged 28)	47	(Australia) Western Force
Wycliff Palu	Number 8	27 July 1982 (aged 33)	57	(Australia) Waratahs
Nick Frisby	Scrum-half	29 October 1992 (aged 23)	0	(Australia) Queensland Reds
Nick Phipps	Scrum-half	9 January 1989 (aged 27)	39	(Australia) Waratahs
Bernard Foley	Fly-half	8 September 1989 (aged 26)	27	(Australia) Waratahs
Christian Lealiifano	Fly-half	24 September 1987 (aged 28)	16	(Australia) Brumbies
Karmichael Hunt	Centre	17 November 1986 (aged 29)	0	(Australia) Queensland Reds
Samu Kerevi	Centre	27 September 1993 (aged 22)	0	(Australia) Queensland Reds
Tevita Kuridrani	Centre	31 March 1991 (aged 25)	31	(Australia) Brumbies
Matt To'omua	Centre	2 January 1990 (aged 26)	31	(Australia) Brumbies
Dane Haylett-Petty	Wing	18 June 1989 (aged 26)	0	(Australia) Western Force
Rob Horne	Wing	15 August 1989 (aged 26)	29	(Australia) Waratahs
Luke Morahan	Wing	13 April 1990 (aged 26)	1	(Australia) Western Force
Taqele Naiyaravoro	Wing	7 December 1991 (aged 24)	1	(Australia) Waratahs
Israel Folau	Fullback	3 April 1989 (aged 27)	38	(Australia) Waratahs
Mike Harris	Fullback	8 July 1988 (aged 27)	10	(Australia) Melbourne Rebels
Reece Hodge	Fullback	26 August 1994 (aged 21)	0	(Australia) Melbourne Rebels

== Matches ==
=== First test ===
11 June 2016
20:00 AEST (UTC+10)

Australia	28–39	England
Try: Hooper (2) 8' m, 58' m Folau 15' m Kuridrani 70' c Con: Foley (1/4) 71'; Pen: Foley (2/2) 36', 77'	Report	Try: Joseph 31' c Yarde 45' c Nowell 79' c Con: Farrell (3/3) 32', 47', 80'; Pen: Farrell (6/7) 20', 27', 30', 40', 56', 66'

Suncorp Stadium, Brisbane
Attendance: 48,735
Referee: Romain Poite (France)

FB	15	Israel Folau
RW	14	Dane Haylett-Petty
OC	13	Tevita Kuridrani
IC	12	Samu Kerevi
LW	11	Rob Horne		(substituted off) 28'
FH	10	Bernard Foley
SH	9	Nick Phipps		(substituted off) 77'
N8	8	David Pocock
OF	7	Michael Hooper			(substituted off) 69'
BF	6	Scott Fardy		(substituted off) 67'	(substituted on) 69'
RL	5	Rob Simmons		(substituted off) 24'
LL	4	Rory Arnold		(substituted off) 47'
TP	3	Greg Holmes		(substituted off) 56'
HK	2	Stephen Moore (c)		(substituted off) 56'
LP	1	Scott Sio	(yellow card) 53' to 63'	(substituted off) 65'
Replacements:
HK	16	Tatafu Polota-Nau		(substituted on) 56'
PR	17	James Slipper		(substituted on) 65'
PR	18	Sekope Kepu		(substituted on) 56'
LK	19	James Horwill		(substituted on) 24'
LK	20	Dean Mumm		(substituted on) 47'
FL	21	Sean McMahon		(substituted on) 67'
SH	22	Nick Frisby		(substituted on) 77'
FH	23	Christian Lealiifano		(substituted on) 28'
Coach:
(Australia) Michael Cheika

FB	15	Mike Brown
RW	14	Anthony Watson	(substituted off) 69'
OC	13	Jonathan Joseph
IC	12	Luther Burrell	(substituted off) 28'
LW	11	Marland Yarde
FH	10	Owen Farrell
SH	9	Ben Youngs	(substituted off) 69'
N8	8	Billy Vunipola	(substituted off) 71'
OF	7	James Haskell
BF	6	Chris Robshaw
RL	5	George Kruis	(substituted off) 59'
LL	4	Maro Itoje
TP	3	Dan Cole	(substituted off) 65'
HK	2	Dylan Hartley (c)	(substituted off) 71'
LP	1	Mako Vunipola	(substituted off) 65'
Replacements:
HK	16	Luke Cowan-Dickie	(substituted on) 71'
PR	17	Matt Mullan	(substituted on) 65'
PR	18	Paul Hill	(substituted on) 65'
LK	19	Joe Launchbury	(substituted on) 71'
LK	20	Courtney Lawes	(substituted on) 59'
SH	21	Danny Care	(substituted on) 69'
FH	22	George Ford	(substituted on) 28'
WG	23	Jack Nowell	(substituted on) 69'
Coach:
(Australia) Eddie Jones

Man of the Match:
James Haskell (England)

Touch judges:
Craig Joubert (South Africa)
Glen Jackson (New Zealand)
Television match official:
Ben Skeen (New Zealand)

Notes:

- Rory Arnold, Nick Frisby, Samu Kerevi and Dane Haylett-Petty (all Australia) made their international debuts.
- Mike Brown (England) earned his 50th test cap.
- England win back-to-back tests in Australia for the first time since 2003, while winning in Brisbane for the first time ever.
- The 39 points scored by England, are the most points scored by England against Australia.

=== Second test ===
18 June 2016
20:00 AEST (UTC+10)

Australia	7–23	England
Try: Moore 34' c Con: Foley (1/1) 35'	Report	Try: Hartley 18' c Farrell 74' c Con: Farrell (2/2) 19', 75'; Pen: Farrell (3/4) 30', 51', 79'

AAMI Park, Melbourne
Attendance: 29,871
Referee: Craig Joubert (South Africa)

FB	15	Israel Folau
RW	14	Dane Haylett-Petty	(substituted off) 69'
OC	13	Tevita Kuridrani
IC	12	Samu Kerevi	(substituted off) 60'
LW	11	Rob Horne
FH	10	Bernard Foley
SH	9	Nick Phipps	(substituted off) 69'
N8	8	Sean McMahon	(substituted off) 50'
OF	7	Michael Hooper
BF	6	Scott Fardy
RL	5	Sam Carter
LL	4	Rory Arnold	33' to 40'		(substituted off) 50'
TP	3	Sekope Kepu	(substituted off) 46'
HK	2	Stephen Moore (c)	(substituted off) 54'
LP	1	James Slipper	(substituted off) 46'
Replacements:
HK	16	Tatafu Polota-Nau	(substituted on) 54'
PR	17	Toby Smith	(substituted on) 46'
PR	18	Greg Holmes	(substituted on) 46'
LK	19	Dean Mumm	(substituted on) 33'	(substituted off) 40'	(substituted on) 50'
N8	20	Ben McCalman	(substituted on) 50'
SH	21	Nick Frisby	(substituted on) 69'
CE	22	Christian Lealiifano	(substituted on) 60'
WG	23	Luke Morahan	(substituted on) 69'
Coach:
(Australia) Michael Cheika

FB	15	Mike Brown
RW	14	Anthony Watson	(substituted off) 76'
OC	13	Jonathan Joseph
IC	12	Owen Farrell
LW	11	Jack Nowell
FH	10	George Ford
SH	9	Ben Youngs	(substituted off) 65'
N8	8	Billy Vunipola
OF	7	James Haskell	(substituted off) 71'
BF	6	Chris Robshaw	(substituted off) 71'
RL	5	George Kruis	(substituted off) 55'
LL	4	Maro Itoje
TP	3	Dan Cole	(substituted off) 65'
HK	2	Dylan Hartley (c)	(substituted off) 71'
LP	1	Mako Vunipola	(substituted off) 65'
Replacements:
HK	16	Jamie George	(substituted on) 71'
PR	17	Matt Mullan	(substituted on) 65'
PR	18	Paul Hill	(substituted on) 65'
LK	19	Joe Launchbury	(substituted on) 71'
LK	20	Courtney Lawes	(substituted on) 55'
FL	21	Jack Clifford	(substituted on) 71'
SH	22	Danny Care	(substituted on) 65'
CE	23	Elliot Daly	(substituted on) 76'
Coach:
(Australia) Eddie Jones

Man of the Match:
Chris Robshaw (England)

Touch judges:
Nigel Owens (Wales)
Mike Fraser (New Zealand)
Television match official:
Glenn Newman (New Zealand)

Notes:

- Chris Robshaw (England) earned his 50th test cap, having started all of his appearances.
- The 16 points England won by is the most they have ever beaten Australia by in Australia, breaking the record of 11 points they set the previous week.
- England retain the Cook Cup for the third consecutive time.
- England win their first ever test series against Australia.
- England win their third consecutive match against Australia in Australia, the first time they have done this.

=== Third test ===
25 June 2016
20:00 AEST (UTC+10)

Australia	40–44	England
Try: Foley 12' c Haylett-Petty 20' m Hooper 50' c Folau 57' c Naiyaravoro 80' m Con: Foley (3/5) 13', 51', 58'; Pen: Foley (3/4) 27', 40', 71'	Report	Try: Cole 10' c Brown 29' c B. Vunipola 43' m George 66' c Con: Farrell (3/4) 11', 30', 67'; Pen: Farrell (6/6) 25', 47', 55', 61', 69', 79'

Allianz Stadium, Sydney
Attendance: 44,063
Referee: Nigel Owens (Wales)

FB	15	Israel Folau
RW	14	Dane Haylett-Petty
OC	13	Tevita Kuridrani
IC	12	Matt To'omua	(substituted off) 67'
LW	11	Rob Horne	(substituted off) 67'
FH	10	Bernard Foley
SH	9	Nick Phipps
N8	8	Sean McMahon
OF	7	Michael Hooper
BF	6	Scott Fardy
RL	5	Rob Simmons	(substituted off) 40'
LL	4	Will Skelton	(substituted off) 51'
TP	3	Sekope Kepu	(substituted off) 58'
HK	2	Stephen Moore (c)	(substituted off) 62'
LP	1	James Slipper	(substituted off) 58'
Replacements:
HK	16	Tatafu Polota-Nau	(substituted on) 62'
PR	17	Scott Sio	(substituted on) 58'
PR	18	Greg Holmes	(substituted on) 58'
LK	19	Adam Coleman	(substituted on) 40'
N8	20	Wycliff Palu	(substituted on) 51'
SH	21	Nick Frisby
FH	22	Christian Lealiifano	(substituted on) 67'
WG	23	Taqele Naiyaravoro	(substituted on) 67'
Coach:
(Australia) Michael Cheika

FB	15	Mike Brown
RW	14	Anthony Watson
OC	13	Jonathan Joseph
IC	12	Owen Farrell
LW	11	Jack Nowell
FH	10	George Ford
SH	9	Ben Youngs	(substituted off) 53'
N8	8	Billy Vunipola	(substituted off) 74'
OF	7	Teimana Harrison	(substituted off) 31'
BF	6	Chris Robshaw	(substituted off) 53'
RL	5	George Kruis	(substituted off) 61'
LL	4	Maro Itoje
TP	3	Dan Cole	(substituted off) 67'
HK	2	Dylan Hartley (c)	(substituted off) 63'
LP	1	Mako Vunipola	(substituted off) 79'
Replacements:
HK	16	Jamie George	(substituted on) 63'
PR	17	Matt Mullan	(substituted on) 79'
PR	18	Paul Hill	(substituted on) 67'
LK	19	Joe Launchbury	(substituted on) 61'
LK	20	Courtney Lawes	(substituted on) 31'
FL	21	Jack Clifford	(substituted on) 53'
SH	22	Danny Care	(substituted on) 53'
CE	23	Elliot Daly	(substituted on) 74'
Coach:
(Australia) Eddie Jones

Man of the Match:
Owen Farrell (England)

Touch judges:
Craig Joubert (South Africa)
Mike Fraser (New Zealand)
Television match official:
Ben Skeen (New Zealand)

Notes:

- Adam Coleman (Australia) made his international debut.
- England score their most points against Australia in Australia, surpassing the 39 points scored in the first test of this test series.
- Australia lose 3–0 for the first time since they lost their three-test series to South Africa in 1971.
- England win their fourth consecutive match against Australia in Australia, the first time they have done this.
- This was the first time three matches had been played in a series between England and Australia.

== Statistics ==
Key

- Con: Conversions
- Pen: Penalties
- DG: Drop goals
- Pts: Points

=== England statistics ===
Name	Played	Tries	Con	Pen	DG	Pts	Temporarily suspended	Red card
Owen Farrell	3	1	8	15	0	66	–	–
Mike Brown	3	1	0	0	0	5	–	–
Dan Cole	3	1	0	0	0	5	–	–
Dylan Hartley	3	1	0	0	0	5	–	–
Jonathan Joseph	3	1	0	0	0	5	–	–
Jack Nowell	3	1	0	0	0	5	–	–
Billy Vunipola	3	1	0	0	0	5	–	–
Jamie George	2	1	0	0	0	5	–	–
Marland Yarde	1	1	0	0	0	5	–	–
Danny Care	3	0	0	0	0	0	–	–
George Ford	3	0	0	0	0	0	–	–
Paul Hill	3	0	0	0	0	0	–	–
Maro Itoje	3	0	0	0	0	0	–	–
George Kruis	3	0	0	0	0	0	–	–
Joe Launchbury	3	0	0	0	0	0	–	–
Courtney Lawes	3	0	0	0	0	0	–	–
Matt Mullan	3	0	0	0	0	0	–	–
Chris Robshaw	3	0	0	0	0	0	–	–
Mako Vunipola	3	0	0	0	0	0	–	–
Anthony Watson	3	0	0	0	0	0	–	–
Ben Youngs	3	0	0	0	0	0	–	–
Jack Clifford	2	0	0	0	0	0	–	–
Elliot Daly	2	0	0	0	0	0	–	–
James Haskell	2	0	0	0	0	0	–	–
Luther Burrell	1	0	0	0	0	0	–	–
Luke Cowan-Dickie	1	0	0	0	0	0	–	–
Teimana Harrison	1	0	0	0	0	0	–	–
Ellis Genge	–	–	–	–	–	0	–	–
Alex Goode	–	–	–	–	–	0	–	–
Kyle Sinckler	–	–	–	–	–	0	–	–
Henry Slade	–	–	–	–	–	0	–	–
Ben Te'o	–	–	–	–	–	0	–	–
Manu Tuilagi	–	–	–	–	–	0	–	–

=== Test series statistics ===
Name	Team	Tries	Con	Pen	DG	Pts
Owen Farrell	England	1	8	15	0	66
Bernard Foley	Australia	1	5	5	0	30
Michael Hooper	Australia	3	0	0	0	15
Israel Folau	Australia	2	0	0	0	10
Mike Brown	England	1	0	0	0	5
Dan Cole	England	1	0	0	0	5
Jamie George	England	1	0	0	0	5
Dylan Hartley	England	1	0	0	0	5
Dane Haylett-Petty	Australia	1	0	0	0	5
Jonathan Joseph	England	1	0	0	0	5
Tevita Kuridrani	Australia	1	0	0	0	5
Stephen Moore	Australia	1	0	0	0	5
Taqele Naiyaravoro	Australia	1	0	0	0	5
Jack Nowell	England	1	0	0	0	5
Billy Vunipola	England	1	0	0	0	5
Marland Yarde	England	1	0	0	0	5

== See also ==
- 2016 mid-year rugby union internationals
- History of rugby union matches between Australia and England
