= John Hayes (rugby union) =

Irish rugby union player

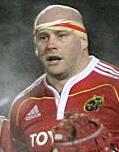
- Hayes in 2010
- Born: John James Hayes; 2 November 1973 (age 53) Dromsally, County Limerick, Ireland
- Height: 1.93 m (6 ft 4 in)
- Weight: 128 kg (20.2 st; 282 lb)
- Notable relative: Tommy Hayes (brother)

Rugby union career
- Position: Prop
Amateur team(s)
Years	Team	Apps	(Points)
- Marist
- Shannon
- Bruff
Senior career
Years	Team	Apps	(Points)
1998–2011	Munster	217	(20)
- Correct as of 27 December 2011
International career
Years	Team	Apps	(Points)
2000–2011	Ireland	105	(10)
2005, 2009	British & Irish Lions	2	(0)
- Correct as of 7 August 2011

John James "The Bull" Hayes (born 2 November 1973) is a retired Irish rugby union player who was the first man to make 100 appearances for his country. A tighthead prop, Hayes was selected for two British and Irish Lions tours, earning two Test caps. At club level he represented Munster over 200 times and played for Limerick junior club Bruff and later top club side Shannon. He also spent a period playing rugby in New Zealand.

== Early rugby ==
Hayes did not start playing rugby until he was 18; prior to this he played with his local GAA club Cappamore. After Bruff, Hayes moved up a grade by joining Shannon. In 1995 he went to Marist Rugby Club (Invercargill), New Zealand, where he changed position from lock to prop because he was a dedicated trainer and his frame had developed. On his return to Ireland, Hayes rejoined Shannon and gained a place on the Munster squad. He later rejoined Bruff when they entered the All-Ireland League as a senior club in 2004.

== Munster ==
In 2006, he helped Munster win the Heineken European Cup in Cardiff's Millennium Stadium on 21 May against Biarritz. Earlier that year, he had helped Ireland secure the Triple Crown.

In 2008, he again helped Munster win the Heineken European Cup in Cardiff's Millennium Stadium on 24 May against Toulouse.

He became the fifth Munster player to win 200 caps in the Magners League semi-final against Ospreys on 14 May 2011. In July 2011, Hayes was left out the 45-man Munster squad for the forthcoming season fuelling speculation that he may retire after the 2011 Rugby World Cup.

Despite the speculation that Hayes would retire, he came off the bench for Munster in their opening Pro12 match against Newport Gwent Dragons in September 2011. Hayes was contracted with Munster until the end of 2011.

Hayes became the first person to play 100 Heineken Cup games in November 2011 when he came on against Northampton Saints in the 2011–12 Heineken Cup.

It was announced that Hayes would retire after Munster's Pro12 fixture against Connacht on 26 December 2011. He was selected to start his final match, and was substituted in the 58th minute, going off the pitch to a huge standing ovation from the crowd. Munster won the match 24–9.

== Ireland ==
Hayes won his first international cap against Scotland in 2000 and was Ireland's first-choice tighthead prop from then until the beginning of the 2010–11 season when he was replaced by Leinster's Mike Ross. He was a member of the British & Irish Lions squad in their tour to New Zealand in 2005 and played in the warm-up test match vs Argentina.

Hayes became Ireland's most capped player during Ireland's first Grand Slam in 61 years in 2009 with 94 appearances.

He earned his 100th cap for Ireland against England on 27 February 2010. He was the first Irish player to do so. Having made his test debut at 26 years and 2 months old, he became the oldest ever debutant to go and win 100 international caps, a title he still holds. Hayes led Ireland out onto the pitch before the game to a standing ovation from the Twickenham crowd. Ireland went on to win 20–16 with a late try by Tommy Bowe. Hayes did not play against the Barbarians in Ireland's first match of the summer tests and missed the test against New Zealand through illness. He came on as a replacement against New Zealand Maori but was left out of the squad to play Australia, thereby losing his title of Ireland's most capped player to Brian O'Driscoll.

Hayes was selected in Ireland's training squad for the 2011 Rugby World Cup warm-ups in August and came off the bench in Ireland's first warm-up against Scotland. This turned out to be his last appearance for Ireland as he was not selected in the final 30-man squad for the tournament in New Zealand. He retired in December 2011.

== 2009 Lions Tour ==
On 18 June 2009, Hayes was called up to the British & Irish Lions squad in South Africa as a replacement for the injured Euan Murray. He played in the final test of the tour.

== Personal life ==
In September 2012, Hayes released his autobiography The Bull: My Story, which details his sporting life. On 5 October 2012, he appeared as a guest on the Late Late Show alongside his wife to talk about his career. He continues to "follow GAA in Limerick very much and especially hurling".

== Statistics ==
=== International analysis by opposition ===
Against	Played	Won	Lost	Drawn	Tries	Points	% Won
Argentina*	7	4	2	1	0	0	57.14
Australia	7	2	4	1	0	0	28.57
Canada	2	1	0	1	0	0	50
England	10	7	3	0	0	0	70
Fiji	2	2	0	0	0	0	100
France	13	4	9	0	0	0	30.77
Georgia	2	2	0	0	0	0	100
Italy	12	12	0	0	0	0	100
Japan	1	1	0	0	0	0	100
Namibia	2	2	0	0	0	0	100
New Zealand	9	0	9	0	0	0	0
Pacific Islanders	1	1	0	0	0	0	100
Romania	4	4	0	0	1	5	100
Russia	1	1	0	0	0	0	100
Samoa	2	2	0	0	0	0	100
Scotland	13	9	4	0	1	5	69.23
South Africa*	7	4	3	0	0	0	57.14
United States	1	1	0	0	0	0	100
Wales	11	8	3	0	0	0	72.73
Total	107	67	37	3	2	10	62.62

Correct as of 5 July 2017 * indicates inclusion of caps for British & Irish Lions

== Honours ==
=== Munster ===
- United Rugby Championship:
  - Winner (3): 2002–03, 2008–09, 2010–11
- Celtic Cup:
  - Winner (1): 2004–05
- European Rugby Champions Cup:
  - Winner (2): 2005–06, 2007–08

=== Ireland ===
- Six Nations Championship:
  - Winner (1): 2009
- Grand Slam:
  - Winner (1): 2009
- Triple Crown:
  - Winner (4): 2004, 2006, 2007, 2009
