= Jonathan Joseph (rugby union) =

English rugby union player (born 1991)

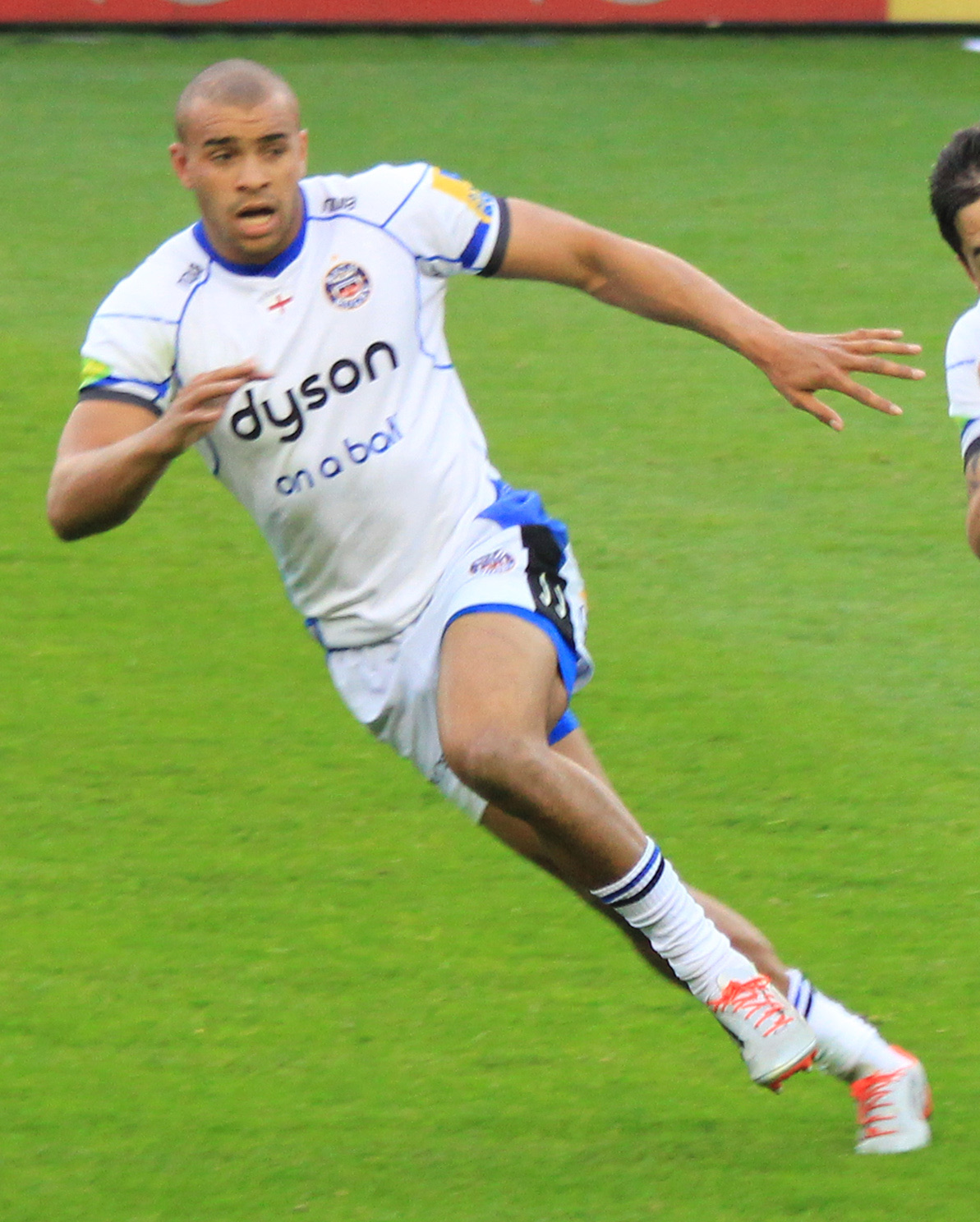
- Born: Jonathan Byron Alexander Joseph; 21 May 1991 (age 35) Derby, England
- Height: 1.83 m (6 ft 0 in)
- Weight: 91 kg (14 st 5 lb; 201 lb)
- School: The Old Vicarage School, Darley Abbey; Park House School; Millfield
- Notable relative: Will Joseph

Rugby union career
- Position(s): Centre, Wing, Fullback
Senior career
Years	Team	Apps	(Points)
2009–2013	London Irish	61	(95)
2013–2023	Bath	175	(162)
2023-2025	Biarritz	15	(5)
- Correct as of 18 October 2024
International career
Years	Team	Apps	(Points)
2010–2011	England U20	9	(10)
2012	England A	1	(0)
2012–2020	England	54	(85)
2017	British & Irish Lions	0	(0)
- Correct as of 28 November 2020

Jonathan Byron Alexander Joseph (born 21 May 1991) is a retired English professional rugby union player. He played club rugby as a centre for London Irish, Bath, and Biarritz, and internationally for England.

== Early career ==
Joseph began his rugby career at Derby RFC. He attended The Old Vicarage School, a preparatory school in Darley Abbey, before the family moved to Berkshire. His father is originally from Grenada and represented Northampton Saints in the 1980s. His younger brother Will Joseph is also a professional rugby player who made his international debut in July 2022.

Joseph attended Millfield and came through the London Irish academy after he spent his teenage years playing at Newbury RFC. At club level, his first senior rugby came on loan to Barnes RFC as injury cover; however, his breakthrough season was for Irish in 2010–11, when he played in thirteen Premiership games and scored five tries. His remarkable rise was marked with a nomination for the Land Rover Discovery of the Season award in 2012. He left London Irish at the end of the 2012–13 season having made 44 appearances and scored 13 tries.

== Club career ==
Joseph joined Bath at the start of the 2013–14 season and quickly forged a successful midfield partnership with inside centre Kyle Eastmond. In his first season at the club he started in their EPCR Challenge Cup final defeat to Northampton at Cardiff Arms Park.

After a relatively quiet inaugural season, Joseph more than hit his straps in his second, proving to be sublime in attack and robust in defence. During their European Champions Cup match away at Stade Toulousain in January 2015, Bath showed scant regard for the French team's vast rugby pedigree and ran in four tries, with Joseph providing the catalyst for what many commentators regard as one of the finest European cup rugby tries of all time. Collecting the ball inside his own half, Joseph wriggled and side-stepped past a number of players before chipping ahead and collecting. After a searing run, again escaping the tackles of many of the Toulouse defenders, he released teammate Ross Batty, who in turn passed to Francois Louw to complete the move in scoring what was a truly audacious try. At the end of the 2014-15 season Joseph scored a try in the Premiership final as Bath finished as runners-up to Saracens.

== International career ==
=== England ===
Joseph progressed through the England age-grade ranks and started for the England U20 side that defeated Ireland in the final round of the 2011 Six Nations Under 20s Championship to complete a grand slam. Later that year he was a member of the squad that finished as runners-up to New Zealand in the final of the 2011 IRB Junior World Championship alongside future England teammates Mako Vunipola, Joe Launchbury, George Ford, Owen Farrell, Elliot Daly and Christian Wade, amongst others. In February 2012, Joseph made his debut at England 'A' level in a defeat against Scotland.

Joseph was one of thirteen uncapped players selected by England head coach Stuart Lancaster for the 2012 mid-year tour of South Africa. On 9 June 2012, he made his debut as a second-half substitute for Mike Brown in the first Test defeat at Kings Park Stadium. An injury to Brad Barritt allowed Joseph to start the subsequent two Tests at outside-centre alongside Manu Tuilagi. He was ruled out of the 2013 Six Nations through injury but was named to start both Test matches on the subsequent tour of Argentina.

Joseph scored his first international try against Wales in the opening game of the 2015 Six Nations. In the next round he scored twice against Italy and was named player of the match. Joseph recorded his fourth try of the competition in the penultimate round against Scotland to finish the top try scorer of the tournament. On 14 May 2015, it was announced that Joseph had won the Rugby Players' Association 'Player's Player of the Year' and 'England Player of the Year' for his outstanding performances for both club and country during the 2014–15 season. He was included in the squad for the 2015 Rugby World Cup and scored in a warm-up loss to France. He played in three of their four pool games as the hosts failed to reach the knockout phase.

Joseph was selected by new coach Eddie Jones for the 2016 Six Nations and during the tournament scored his first hat-trick at international level away to Italy. He started all five games during the competition including the final match as England defeated France to achieve their first Grand Slam in over a decade. He scored a try in the opening game of their 2016 tour of Australia and also started the next two Tests as England completed a series whitewash. Later that year he scored tries in autumn internationals against Fiji and Australia. The following year saw Joseph accomplish another hat-trick in the penultimate round of the 2017 Six Nations against Scotland. He also started in the final game of the competition as England missed out on a consecutive grand slam with defeat away to Ireland which also brought an end to a record equalling eighteen successive Test victories. Later that year he scored another try in a victory over Australia.

Joseph was included in the squad for the 2019 Rugby World Cup. He played in the quarter-final and semi-final victories over Australia and New Zealand. In the 2019 Rugby World Cup Final he came off the bench during the second-half to replace Jonny May as England were defeated by South Africa to finish as runners-up. After the World Cup Joseph won his fiftieth cap during the 2020 Six Nations and also started in the final round victory against Italy which meant England won the tournament. Later that year he played in the Autumn Nations Cup; however, a calf injury ruled him out of the final of the competition.

=== British & Irish Lions ===
Joseph was selected as one of the 41 British & Irish Lions players that toured New Zealand in the summer of 2017. He did not participate in the Test series but did score a try in a tour game against Highlanders.

=== International tries ===
As of 31 October 2020

Try	Opposing team	Location	Venue	Competition	Date	Result	Score
1	Wales	Cardiff, Wales	Millennium Stadium	2015 Six Nations	6 February 2015	Win	21 – 16
2	Italy	London, England	Twickenham Stadium	2015 Six Nations	14 February 2015	Win	47 – 17
3	Italy	London, England	Twickenham Stadium	2015 Six Nations	14 February 2015	Win	47 – 17
4	Scotland	London, England	Twickenham Stadium	2015 Six Nations	14 March 2015	Win	25 – 13
5	France	Paris, France	Stade de France	2015 Rugby World Cup Warm-Up	22 August 2015	Loss	20 – 25
6	Italy	Rome, Italy	Stadio Olimpico	2016 Six Nations	14 February 2016	Win	40 – 9
7	Italy	Rome, Italy	Stadio Olimpico	2016 Six Nations	14 February 2016	Win	40 – 9
8	Italy	Rome, Italy	Stadio Olimpico	2016 Six Nations	14 February 2016	Win	40 – 9
9	Australia	Brisbane, Australia	Suncorp Stadium	2016 England Tour of Australia	11 June 2016	Win	39 – 28
10	Fiji	London, England	Twickenham Stadium	2016 end-of-year rugby union internationals	19 November 2016	Win	58 – 15
11	Fiji	London, England	Twickenham Stadium	2016 end-of-year rugby union internationals	19 November 2016	Win	58 – 15
12	Australia	London, England	Twickenham Stadium	2016 end-of-year rugby union internationals	3 December 2016	Win	37 – 21
13	Australia	London, England	Twickenham Stadium	2016 end-of-year rugby union internationals	3 December 2016	Win	37 – 21
14	Scotland	London, England	Twickenham Stadium	2017 Six Nations	11 March 2017	Win	61 – 21
15	Scotland	London, England	Twickenham Stadium	2017 Six Nations	11 March 2017	Win	61 – 21
16	Scotland	London, England	Twickenham Stadium	2017 Six Nations	11 March 2017	Win	61 – 21
17	Australia	London, England	Twickenham Stadium	2017 end-of-year rugby union internationals	18 November 2017	Win	30 – 6

== Honours ==
England

- Six Nations Championship: 2016, 2017, 2020
- Rugby World Cup runner-up: 2019

Bath

- Premiership runner up: 2014–15
- EPCR Challenge Cup runner up: 2013–14
