= Tommy Hayes (rugby union, born 1980) =

Irish rugby union player

Thomas Hayes
- Born: 31 May 1980 (age 46) Limerick, Ireland
- Height: 1.93 m (6 ft 4 in)
- Weight: 110 kg (17 st; 240 lb)
- Notable relative: John Hayes (brother)

Rugby union career
- Position(s): Lock, Number 8
Amateur team(s)
Years	Team	Apps	(Points)
- Bruff
–	Shannon		
Senior career
Years	Team	Apps	(Points)
2003–2005	Munster	9	
- Plymouth
2008–2013	Exeter Chiefs	136	
- Correct as of 13 February 2020

Tommy Hayes is a former Irish rugby union player. His preferred position was number 8.

When he first moved from Ireland to England, Hayes played at Plymouth Albion but then transferred to Exeter Chiefs where he remained for the rest of his career. He was their captain in May 2010 when they defeated Bristol in a 2 legged playoff, to win promotion to the Aviva Premiership. Hayes remained as captain the following season which was Exeter's first in the English professional top flight. He was also captain for Exeter Chiefs qualification into the European Champions Cup and Capatined them in their first Champions Cup fixture against Leinster.

Exeter Chiefs announced Tommy's Retirement on 6 November 2013, citing a troublesome back injury as his reason for retiring.

He is the brother of record setting Irish Prop John Hayes. Following in the footsteps of his older brother John, Tom also played for County Limerick team Bruff R.F.C. as a youths player, winning an U18 AIL medal during the 1997 season which Bruff shared with Corinthians following a final which was tied after extra time.
