= Tom Mercey =

English rugby union player

- Born: Thomas Mercey; 15 June 1987 (age 39) Lewisham, London, England
- Height: 1.80 m (5 ft 11 in)
- Weight: 113 kg (17 st 11 lb)
- School: Dulwich College
- University: Birkbeck, University of London

Rugby union career
- Position: Tighthead prop
- Current team: Northampton Saints
Youth career
- 1993–2003: Blackheath F.C.
- 2003–2005: Saracens Academy
Senior career
Years	Team	Apps	(Points)
2005–2010	Saracens	29	(5)
2010–2016	Northampton	88	(0)
- Correct as of 7 March 2010
International career
Years	Team	Apps	(Points)
2003	England U16		
2005–2006	England U19	12	(0)
2006	England U21	2	(0)
2007 –	England Saxons	9	(0)
- Correct as of 7 February 2010

Thomas Mercey (born 15 June 1987 in Lewisham, London) is a retired rugby union footballer who plays at prop for Northampton Saints in the Aviva Premiership.

In 2007 he made his debut for the England Saxons having already represented England at Under 21, Under 19, and Under 16 levels.

== Early life ==
Mercey was born 15 June 1987 in the Tower Hamlets borough of London, England. He was educated at Dulwich College who he represented at rugby as well as local National Division One side Blackheath F.C., before joining the Guinness Premiership side Saracens Academy system. While at school he represented England at Under 16 level.

== Club career ==
=== Saracens 2005–2010 ===
Having progressed through the Saracens Academy Mercey began to take part in the main squad in the 2004–05 season, taking part in Saracens 'A' team sides.

This progression continued in the following season when he became a full-time member of the Saracens squad while still part of the Academy system on 1 July 2005.

On 21 January 2006 Mercey made his debut for the Saracens first team in a Heineken Cup game against Biarritz Olympique.

The 2006–07 season saw Mercey make his Guinness Premiership debut and he went on to make four appearances, all from the replacements bench, and 13 first team appearances in all competitions.

The 2007–08 season saw Mercey making regular first team appearances, including his first in a starting line up for a Guinness Premiership game.

=== Northampton Saints 2010– ===
On 25 February 2010, Northampton Saints announced they had signed Mercey for the 2010–2011 season.

Mercey was injured throughout the first part of the 2012/13 season but his comeback coincided with an injury to Brian Mujati and therefore Mercey started several games in a row, not scoring but turning in some good performances.

In 2014 Mercey played as a replacement as Northampton beat Saracens to win the Premiership final.

== International career ==
Mercey was first selected for England U19 duty a year ahead of many of his peers, which included four appearances in the 2005 IRB Under 19 World Championships as well as outings in the 2004–05 U19 Six Nations.

Mercey was again called up for England U19 duty in the 2006 World Championships, before once again taking a step up ahead of his peers to represent the Under 21 side at the 2006 IRB Under 21 World Championships featuring in winning sides against Fiji and Wales.

At a national level he moved on from age group rugby to represent England Saxons in the Six Nations 'A' tournament, making his debut against Italy 'A' in February 2007. His performance saw him soon in Saxons colours just two months later, as he appeared in every game in the Saxon's victorious 2007 Churchill Cup campaign.
