= Dan Cole (rugby union) =

English rugby union player (born 1987)

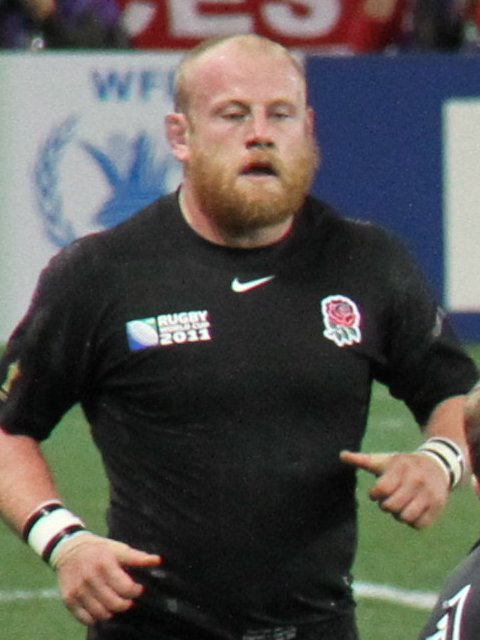
- Cole representing England during the Rugby World Cup
- Full name: Daniel Richard Cole
- Born: 9 May 1987 (age 39) Leicester, England
- Height: 1.91 m (6 ft 3 in)
- Weight: 124 kg (273 lb; 19 st 7 lb)
- School: Kibworth High School; Robert Smyth Academy; Wyggeston and Queen Elizabeth I College

Rugby union career
- Position: Prop
Senior career
| Years | Team | Apps | (Points) |
| 2007–2025 | Leicester Tigers | 343 | (30) |
| 2006–2008 | → Bedford Blues (loan) | 34 | (20) |
| 2008–2009 | → Nottingham (loan) | 5 | (0) |
| 2006–2025 | Total | 382 | (50) |
- Correct as of 15 June 2025
International career
| Years | Team | Apps | (Points) |
| 2006 | England U19 | 4 | (0) |
| 2009–2010 | England Saxons | 4 | (5) |
| 2010–2024 | England | 118 | (20) |
| 2010 | England XV | 1 | (0) |
| 2013–2017 | British & Irish Lions | 3 | (0) |
- Correct as of 3 November 2024
Medal record
Men's Rugby union
Representing England
Rugby World Cup
| Silver medal – second place | 2019 Japan | Squad |
| Bronze medal – third place | 2023 France | Squad |

Daniel Richard Cole (born 9 May 1987) is a former English professional rugby union player who played as a prop for Premiership Rugby club Leicester Tigers and the England national team.

Cole won the Premiership four times; winning in 2009, 2010, 2013, and 2022 and was runner up a further three times.

Cole was part of multiple Six Nations Championship campaigns, including victories in 2017 and 2020 and the Grand Slam in 2016. Predominantly playing as a tighthead prop, he earned 118 test caps and represented the British & Irish Lions on two separate tours to Australia and New Zealand.

On 27 May 2025, Cole announced that he would be retiring at the end of the season.

== Club career ==
Cole's first team début came in the October 2007 EDF Energy Cup pool match against Bath. Most of the 2007–08 season was spent on loan to Bedford Blues and it was the beginning of the 2008–09 season before Cole played for the first team again. Cole was involved in most of the games in the first half of the season. In January 2009, Cole was loaned to Nottingham R.F.C. and subsequently returned to Leicester later in the season to feature as a replacement as Tigers beat London Irish by a single point in the final of the 2008–09 Premiership.

Through injury to Leicester tight-heads Julian White and Martin Castrogiovanni, Cole achieved a run of games during the 2009–10 season which saw him gain notoriety as man-of-the-match against Wasps. In February 2010, Cole signed a new contract. The Tigers went on to retain their league title winning the 2009–10 Premiership final 33–27 against Saracens, where Cole again came on as a replacement for Castrogiovanni. In 2013 Cole won his third Premiership title on this occasion starting in the victory over local rivals Northampton Saints.

Cole won the Outstanding Service Award at the end of the 2016/17 season.

Cole started the 2022 Premiership Rugby final as Tigers beat Saracens 15-12, with Cole winning his fourth title. On 17 December 2022 Cole made his 300th appearance for Leicester, only the 36th player to achieve the feat, in a 23-16 win against Clermont Auvergne.

In June 2025, Cole played his last ever game of professional rugby with Leicester Tigers in 2024–25 Premiership Rugby final against Bath. Having been brought on in the second half, he received a yellow card for a charge down, ending his career off the pitch as his side were defeated 23–21.

== International career ==
=== England ===
Cole was a member of the squad that finished third at the 2006 Under 19 Rugby World Championship and the following year represented the England under-20 team in the Six Nations Under 20s Championship. In January 2009 he made his debut for the England Saxons against Portugal and later that year started all three games at the 2009 Churchill Cup, including the final against Ireland A.

Cole was promoted to the Senior Squad for the 2010 Six Nations Championship as injury cover for Tigers squadmate Julian White and made his senior England debut as a replacement for David Wilson in England's 30–17 win over Wales in the opening round of the tournament on 6 February 2010. He played in all subsequent games in the 2010 Six Nations, earning his first start against Italy and scoring his first international try in what was also his first home start against Ireland, and began to cement his place as England's first-choice tighthead.

Cole was taken on the 2010 summer tour of Australia and played in both matches. Although England lost the first game, Cole put in a strong performance which saw the England scrum gain an unprecedented two penalty tries. The second Test saw England beat Australia 20–21. He was a member of the side that won the 2011 Six Nations Championship missing out on a grand slam with defeat in the final round against Ireland. He was included in the squad for the 2011 Rugby World Cup and started in their quarter-final elimination against France.

Cole won his fiftieth cap in the final round of the 2015 Six Nations Championship against France as England finished runners up in the tournament. He was included in Stuart Lancaster's 31-man squad for the 2015 Rugby World Cup and went on to start in all four of their pool games as the hosts failed to reach the knock out phase.

Cole was included in new coach Eddie Jones's 31-man squad for the 2016 Six Nations and scored a try in the final game against France as England completed the grand slam. Cole was included in the 2016 tour of Australia; he played in the one-off test against Wales at Twickenham, which also saw a debut for Leicester teammate Ellis Genge, and started in all three tests in Australia. Cole scored a try in the final test of the series in which England whitewashed the Wallabies for the first time. The following year saw Cole score a try against Italy during the 2017 Six Nations Championship as the team eventually retained their title missing out on a consecutive grand slam with defeat in the final game away to Ireland which also brought an end to a record equalling eighteen successive Test victories.

Although Cole was dropped from England's international team at the end of 2018, a resurgence in form saw him re-selected for the 2019 Six Nations Championship. Cole's continued good form saw him chosen for the 2019 Rugby World Cup, for what would be his third Rugby World Cup. On 26 September 2019, in a World Cup pool match against the United States, Cole became England's joint-third highest capped player with 91 international appearances. In the World Cup final starter Kyle Sinckler was knocked unconscious after two minutes and replaced by Cole for the remainder of the game as England were defeated by South Africa to finish runners up.

On 7 August 2023, Cole was named in England's squad for the 2023 Rugby World Cup.

=== British and Irish Lions ===
Cole was one of 37 players selected to represent the Lions on their 2013 British & Irish Lions tour to Australia and came on as a replacement in all three Tests as the Lions won their first series for sixteen years.

In 2017 Cole was selected for the British & Irish Lions tour to New Zealand, he did not make the test team but featured in five non-capped tour games. Overall he played fourteen times for the Lions on the 2013 and 2017 tours winning three caps.

== Career statistics ==
=== List of international tries ===
| No. | Date | Venue | Opponent | Score | Result | Competition | Ref. |
|---|---|---|---|---|---|---|---|
| 1 | 27 February 2010 | Twickenham Stadium, London, England | Ireland | 11–13 | 16–20 | 2010 Six Nations Championship | |
| 2 | 19 March 2016 | Stade de France, Paris, France | France | 15–6 | 31–21 | 2016 Six Nations Championship | |
| 3 | 25 June 2016 | Sydney Football Stadium, Sydney, Australia | Australia | 5–0 | 44–40 | 2016 England rugby union tour of Australia | |
| 4 | 26 February 2017 | Twickenham Stadium, London, England | Italy | 5–0 | 36–15 | 2017 Six Nations Championship | |

as of 7 July 2019

== Honours ==
=== England ===
- 3× Six Nations Championship: 2011, 2016, 2017
- 1× Rugby World Cup runner-up: 2019

=== Leicester Tigers ===
- 4× Premiership Rugby: 2009, 2010, 2013, 2022
- 3× Premiership Rugby runner-up: 2011, 2012, 2025
- 1× EPCR Challenge Cup runner-up: 2021
