= Dylan Hartley =

England international rugby union player (born 1986)

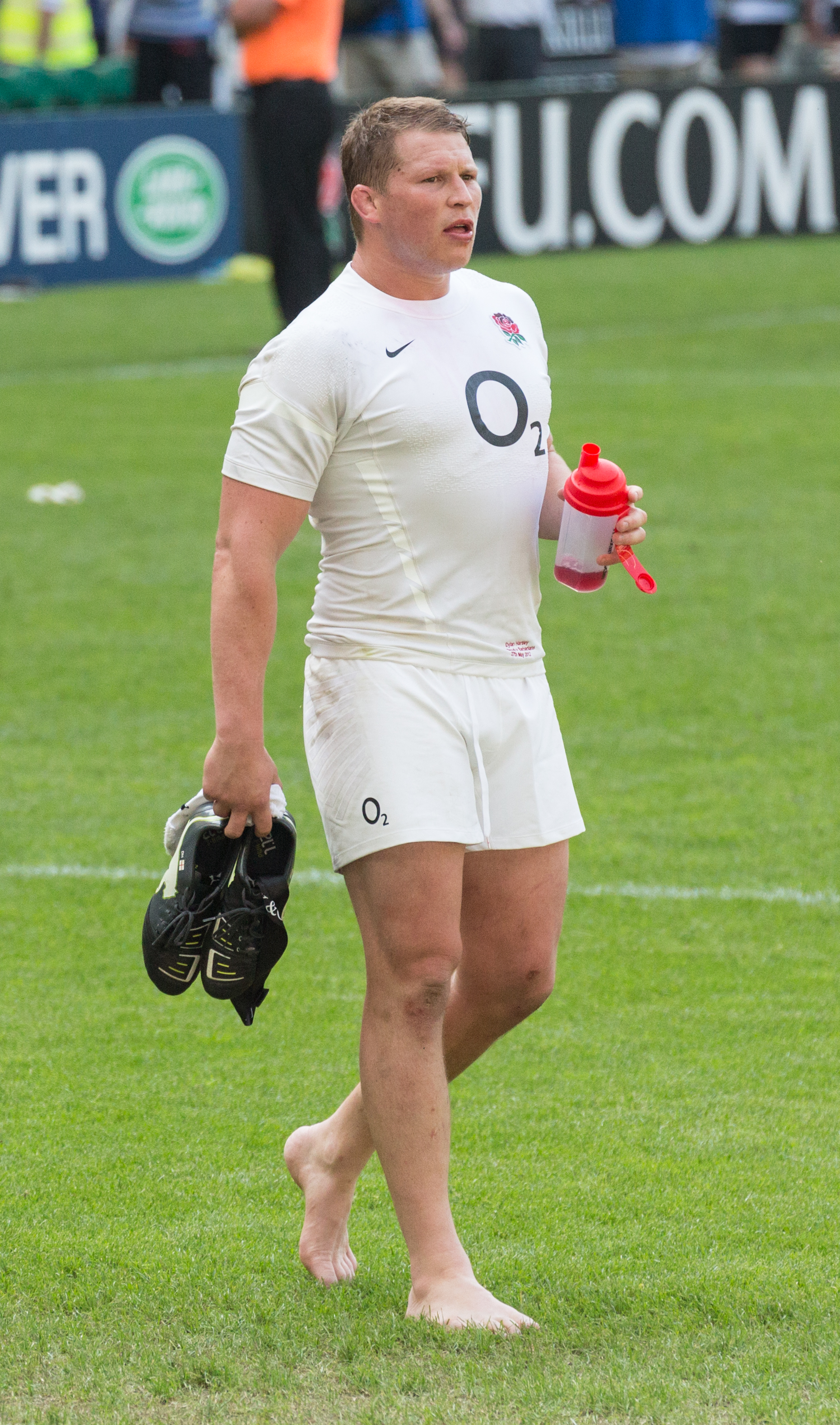
- Hartley in May 2012
- Born: Dylan Michael Hartley; 24 March 1986 (age 40) Rotorua, New Zealand
- Height: 1.85 m (6 ft 1 in)
- Weight: 110 kg (17 st 5 lb; 243 lb)
- School: Rotorua Boys' High School; Beacon Community College

Rugby union career
- Position: Hooker
Senior career
Years	Team	Apps	(Points)
2003–2005	Worcester Warriors	1	(5)
2005–2019	Northampton Saints	251	(140)
- Correct as of 7 November 2019
International career
Years	Team	Apps	(Points)
2007–2008	England Saxons	5	(10)
2008–2018	England	97	(20)
- Correct as of 7 November 2019

Dylan Hartley (born 24 March 1986) is a former rugby union player who represented England and Northampton Saints.

Hartley was the captain of England from January 2016 until the end of his international career in 2019. Earning his first cap in 2008, he formerly held the record for the most capped England hooker ever before being overtaken by Jamie George in 2025. Hartley captained England to a Grand Slam in 2016, the first time that England had achieved this since 2003, then back-to-back Six Nations titles and notably a historic 3-0 series win in the 2016 Cook Cup against Australia. In 14 domestic seasons with Northampton Saints Hartley captained the Saints for 8 years through their most successful period in the club’s 130-year history.

== Early career ==
Dylan Hartley was born in Rotorua, New Zealand. He attended Rotorua Boys' High School.

Although Hartley was born and grew up in New Zealand, his mother being English automatically made him England-qualified. With this in mind Hartley set his sights on playing professionally in England. At 16 he left his native New Zealand and headed to England where he attended Beacon Academy. Within a year, Worcester Warriors had offered him an academy place and at 17 years old he joined and embarked on what ended up being a 16 year professional career with Northampton Saints and England Rugby.

== Domestic career ==
Hartley joined Worcester Warriors' academy and represented the senior side once in the 2004–05 European Challenge Cup. He joined the Senior Academy of Northampton Saints in the summer of 2005.

Hartley started in the 2007 Heineken Cup quarter-final victory over Biarritz Olympique but did not feature in the semi-final defeat against Wasps. That season, Northampton were relegated from the Premiership. The following campaign saw Northampton beat Exeter Chiefs in the 2008 EDF Energy Trophy final and also secure an immediate return to the Premiership with promotion from the RFU Championship.

Hartley played in the 2008–09 European Challenge Cup quarter-final victory against Connacht and semi-final win over Saracens. He was named player of the match in the final as Northampton beat Bourgoin to lift the trophy. After that season, on 22 July 2009, Hartley was made Northampton captain, replacing Bruce Reihana.

Hartley led the side in the 2010–11 Heineken Cup quarter-final against Ulster and semi-final win over Perpignan. Hartley scored a try during the 2011 Heineken Cup final to give Northampton a sixteen point lead at half-time. However Leinster staged a second-half comeback at the Millennium Stadium to become champions of Europe.

Hartley captained Northampton in the 2013 Premiership Final and was sent off for verbally abusing referee Wayne Barnes as they were ultimately defeated by rivals Leicester Tigers to finish runners up. The following season he was part of the Northampton side that beat Saracens in the last minute of extra time to win their first ever league title.

On 17 December 2014, Northampton announced that Hartley had extended his contract for a further three years, despite a more lucrative offer from French side Montpellier, with Hartley citing his desire to remain eligible for England selection as a deciding factor.

On 7 November 2019, Hartley announced his retirement from rugby due to a knee injury that had kept him side-lined for all of 2019.

== International career ==
Hartley represented England at under-18 and under-19 level and was a member of the England U21 squad that finished seventh at the 2005 Under 21 Rugby World Championship. In February 2007 he made his first appearance for England Saxons against Italy A. Later that year he was under consideration for the 2007 Rugby World Cup however a disciplinary ban ended his hopes of selection.

Hartley was included in the senior England squad for the 2008 tour of New Zealand but did not feature in the series. Later that year he was selected by coach Martin Johnson for the 2008 Autumn internationals. On 8 November 2008, Hartley made his test debut as a substitute against Pacific Islanders.

In June 2009, Hartley made his first start for England in a victory against Argentina at Old Trafford. He also played in the next test which Los Pumas won to draw the series. The following year Hartley scored his first international try during a 2010 autumn international defeat against the nation of his birth New Zealand.

Hartley started every round of the 2011 Six Nations Championship as England won their first title in almost a decade. Later that year he was included in the squad for the 2011 Rugby World Cup which was ultimately the only world cup he attended. Hartley came off the bench as a substitute replacement for Steve Thompson in their quarter-final elimination against France.

Hartley was initially selected by coach Warren Gatland for the 2013 British & Irish Lions tour to Australia but did not take part due to being banned after verbally abusing a referee. Later that year Hartley earned his fiftieth cap during the 2013 autumn internationals.

Hartley was part of the England side that finished runners-up in the 2015 Six Nations Championship. Later that year he was not considered for selection to compete at the 2015 Rugby World Cup due to disciplinary reasons.

Hartley was named as the new England captain by coach Eddie Jones for the 2016 Six Nations Championship, replacing Chris Robshaw. England subsequently completed their first Grand Slam for over a decade. In June 2016, Hartley led the side during their 2016 tour of Australia and in the opening match became England's most capped hooker, a record he would hold until being overtaken by Jamie George a decade later. Hartley scored a try in the next test as England won their first ever series in Australia.

Hartley captained England as they retained their title during the 2017 Six Nations Championship. The defeat in the last round away to Ireland prevented a consecutive grand slam and brought an end to a world record equalling run of eighteen test victories in a row. Later that year he led the side to a series victory during their 2017 tour of Argentina.

Hartley scored tries in 2018 Autumn International games against New Zealand and Japan. He then played in their next game which saw them defeat Australia. Due to injury this proved to be his 97th and last appearance for England.

=== International tries ===
As of 7 July 2019

Try	Opposing team	Location	Venue	Competition	Date	Result	Score
1	New Zealand	London, England	Twickenham Stadium	2010 end-of-year rugby union internationals	6 November 2010	Loss	16 – 26
2	Australia	Melbourne, Australia	AAMI Park	2016 Tour of Australia	18 June 2016	Win	23 – 7
3	New Zealand	London, England	Twickenham Stadium	2018 end-of-year rugby union internationals	10 November 2018	Loss	15 – 16
4	Japan	London, England	Twickenham Stadium	2018 Autumn Internationals	17 November 2018	Win	35 – 15

== Disciplinary problems ==
=== Major instances ===
Hartley had a large number of disciplinary problems in matches amounting to a total of 60 banned weeks in his career.

In April 2007 Hartley was banned for 26 weeks for making contact with the eye of Wasps forwards James Haskell and Johnny O'Connor. The ban dealt an even bigger blow for Hartley as his hopes of joining the England World Cup squad were dashed and his club Northampton Saints were relegated in the same week. Hartley saw his second ban come 5 years later in March 2012, 8 weeks for biting the finger of Ireland forward Stephen Ferris in a Six Nations match. Then in December 2012 Hartley was banned for two weeks for punching Ulster hooker Rory Best in a Heineken Cup match. In May 2013 Hartley was sent off in the Aviva Premiership final against Leicester and banned for 11 weeks after being found guilty of verbally abusing a match official. This cost Hartley his place in the 2013 British & Irish Lions tour to Australia.

In December 2014, Hartley was banned for three weeks for an elbowing offence in the match against Leicester Tigers. His elbow made contact with the nose of winger Matt Smith. In May 2015, Hartley was found guilty of making contact with the head of opposite number Jamie George in the Premiership semi-final loss to Saracens at Franklin's Gardens. He was found guilty by the citing commissioner and banned for four weeks, resulting in him not being selected for the 2015 Rugby World Cup. In December 2016, Hartley was banned for 6 weeks having caught Leinster Rugby player Sean O'Brien with a swinging arm to the back of the head in a European Champions Cup game.

=== Weeks banned ===
- 2007: 26 weeks
- 2012: 8 weeks
- 2012: 2 weeks
- 2013: 11 weeks
- 2014: 3 weeks
- 2015: 4 weeks
- 2016: 6 weeks

== Honours ==
Northampton

- Premiership: 2013–14
- EPCR Challenge Cup: 2008–09
- RFU Championship: 2007–08
- EDF Energy Trophy: 2007–08
- European Rugby Champions Cup runner-up: 2010–11

England

- Six Nations Championship: 2011, 2016, 2017
