= Stuart Commins =

South African rugby union footballer (born 1988)

Stuart Commins (born 20 December 1988) is a South African former rugby union footballer. He attended Diocesan College (Bishops) in Rondebosch, Cape Town and was Head of School.

Commins spent two years at Northampton Saints from 2010 to 2012, making 17 appearances for the club, including an appearance in the 2011 Heineken Cup Final in Cardiff against Leinster Rugby. After agreeing to join London Irish for the 2012–13 season, Commins decided to leave London Irish at the end of October, and play for Oxford University against Cambridge in the Varsity Match at Twickenham. He helped them secure a 26-19 victory in the 131st Nomura Varsity Match.

He signed a short-term contract at Wasps RFC in 2013. On 10 May 2013, it was announced Commins would join newly promoted Ealing Trailfinders Rugby Club for their début season in the Championship for 2013–14.

In his early years, the scrumhalf was a member of the University of Cape Town (UCT) rugby team, for four years. As vice-captain Stuart helped UCT reach the final of the 2010 South African Varsity Competition. He also played for Western Province in the u19 Currie Cup Competition in 2007, and then represented his home province in the U21 Currie Cup Competition in 2008 and 2009.

Since retiring from professional rugby, Commins has worked in real estate. In 2017, he took a position at Colliers International in London.
