= Mark Sorenson (rugby union) =

- Born: Mark Sorenson; 5 April 1979 (age 47) Wellington, New Zealand
- Height: 1.96 m (6 ft 5 in)
- Weight: 114 kg (17 st 13 lb)

Rugby union career
- Position: Lock
Senior career
Years	Team	Apps	(Points)
2002–2006	Bay of Plenty		
2006–2010	Newcastle Falcons	100	(0)
2010–2013	Northampton Saints	57	(0)
2013-	Bristol Rugby	82	(5)

Mark Sorenson (born 5 April 1979) is a former New Zealand rugby union player, his position of choice being a lock.

Sorenson joined Northampton from Newcastle Falcons in the summer of 2010, having previously joined the Falcons in the autumn of 2006 from New Zealand province Bay of Plenty, where he had been voted the team's best forward in the Air New Zealand Cup. He was a consistent performer at Kingston Park and won both the Supporters Club player of the season and the players' player of the season award in 2007/8.

On 14 February 2013, Sorensen left Northampton Saints to join Bristol Rugby in the RFU Championship for the 2013/14 season. In February 2016, he renewed his contract with Bristol for one more season. He is set to retire at the end of 2017.
