= 2013 British & Irish Lions tour to Australia =

Rugby union tour

- The logo of the 2013 Lions tour
- Date: 1 June – 6 July
- Coach: (New Zealand) Warren Gatland
- Tour captain: (Wales) Sam Warburton
- Test series winners: British & Irish Lions (2–1)
- Top point scorer: (Wales) Leigh Halfpenny (114)
- Top try scorer(s): (Wales) Alex Cuthbert (4) (Wales) George North (4)
- Top test point scorer: (Wales) Leigh Halfpenny (49)
- Top test try scorer: (Wales) George North (2)
Summary
P	W	D	L
Total
10	8	0	2
Test match
3	2	0	1
Opponent
P	W	D	L
Australia
3	2	0	1

Tour chronology
- ← South Africa 2009 New Zealand 2017 →

The 2013 British & Irish Lions tour to Australia was a rugby union tour during June and July 2013. The British & Irish Lions played ten matches - a three-test series against Australia, and matches against the five Australian Super Rugby sides, a Combined New South Wales–Queensland Country team, and a match en route to Australia against the Barbarians.

The Lions won the test series 2–1. The first test was won by the Lions 23–21, the second by Australia 16–15, and the final test by the Lions 41–16. The victory was the Lions' first test series win since defeating South Africa in 1997. Aside from the second test, the Lions' only loss was 14–12 to the Brumbies in Canberra.

Wales head coach Warren Gatland was the Lions' head coach, and their tour captain was Sam Warburton.

== Schedule ==
Ahead of the tour of Australia, the Lions played the Barbarians in Hong Kong on 1 June to mark the 125th anniversary of the first Lions tour. They then played the five Australian Super Rugby teams, a Combined Country team and three tests in Brisbane, Melbourne and Sydney.

Notes: Bold denotes the winner of each match.

Date	Home team	Score	Away team	Venue		Result
1 June	**British & Irish Lions**	59–8	Barbarians	Hong Kong Stadium, Hong Kong	Match details	Win
5 June	Western Force	17–69	**British & Irish Lions**	Patersons Stadium, Perth	Match details	Win
8 June	Queensland Reds	12–22	**British & Irish Lions**	Suncorp Stadium, Brisbane	Match details	Win
11 June	Combined Country	0–64	**British & Irish Lions**	Hunter Stadium, Newcastle	Match details	Win
15 June	New South Wales Waratahs	17–47	**British & Irish Lions**	Sydney Football Stadium, Sydney	Match details	Win
18 June	**Brumbies**	14–12	British & Irish Lions	Canberra Stadium, Canberra	Match details	Loss
22 June	Australia	21–23	**British & Irish Lions**	Suncorp Stadium, Brisbane	Match details	Win
25 June	Melbourne Rebels	0–35	**British & Irish Lions**	AAMI Park, Melbourne	Match details	Win
29 June	**Australia**	16–15	British & Irish Lions	Etihad Stadium, Melbourne	Match details	Loss
6 July	Australia	16–41	**British & Irish Lions**	ANZ Stadium, Sydney	Match details	Win

== Test series ==
The Lions won the best-of-three test series 2–1, after a convincing victory in the deciding third test followed narrow victories for both teams in the preceding two matches. The teams competed for the Tom Richards Cup, which was first presented in 2001, the last time the Lions toured the country. Australia won the 2001 test series 2–1. Before the start of the 2013 series, the Lions had won 15 of their 20 tests against Australia dating back to 1899.

=== First test ===
The Lions won the first test 23–21. Australia's Christian Lealiifano, making his debut, had to be replaced after just 52 seconds when he was knocked out attempting to tackle Jonathan Davies. Australia recovered from that setback to score the opening try, Israel Folau scoring on his debut with a sprint to the line after a chip through by scrum-half Will Genia. George North then added to a Leigh Halfpenny penalty with a try of his own, evading Pat McCabe and James O'Connor on his way to the line. He might have had a second a few minutes later, but the television match official deemed him to have been in touch before grounding the ball, meaning that the Lions had to settle for another penalty. Instead it was Folau who picked up a second try, beating Johnny Sexton and Halfpenny to cut the Lions' lead to a single point at half-time.

After two more Australian backs – Berrick Barnes and McCabe – suffered injuries, Michael Hooper had to move into the centres, and Liam Gill took his place in the back row. The Lions took advantage of Hooper's unfamiliar position and Alex Cuthbert scored under the posts. An exchange of penalties left Australia within two points of the Lions going into the last five minutes. Kurtley Beale had two late penalty opportunities for Australia, but missed twice, slipping as he made his second attempt with the last kick of the game.

=== Second test ===
Australia won a close game. Leigh Halfpenny's penalty kicking gave the Lions the lead, but the Wallabies scored the only try of the game through Adam Ashley-Cooper in the 74th minute, eventually winning 16–15. In the last minute of the game, a Leigh Halfpenny penalty kick that would have won the game for the Lions dropped short of the posts, meaning that the series would be decided by the final test.

=== Third test ===
The Lions made six changes to their starting team. Tour captain Sam Warburton and 2009 captain Paul O'Connell were both injured. Pre-game controversy focused on the decision of the Lions coaches to drop experienced centre Brian O'Driscoll, who had been widely expected to take over the captaincy, in favour of the Welsh combination of Jamie Roberts and Jonathan Davies. The Lions' starting team included 10 Welshmen in all. Australia were unchanged except for the selection of George Smith, returning from international retirement, at openside flanker.

Australia gave away possession at the kick-off, and Alex Corbisiero scored an early try for the Lions. The Lions extended this lead through four penalties from Leigh Halfpenny to one from Christian Leali'ifano. The Wallabies conceded several penalties, as well as a sin-binning, at the scrum, although in the period either side of half-time, they recovered to trail only 19–16. The Lions scored three further tries to win 41–16, thus recording the most points by a Lions side in a test match.

== Squads ==
=== Lions ===
Tour manager Andy Irvine announced an initial squad of 37 on 30 April 2013, made up of 15 players from Wales, 10 from England, nine from Ireland and three from Scotland.

Wales' Sam Warburton was named captain; at the age of 24, he was the youngest man to lead the Lions. Warburton was captain of Wales during their Six Nations Grand Slam in 2012, and during the 2011 World Cup, where they finished fourth. Previous Lions captains Paul O'Connell (from 2009) and Brian O'Driscoll (2005) were also chosen.

Dylan Hartley was initially selected but was removed from the squad before the squad departed, after being suspended for 11 weeks for abusing a referee. Rory Best replaced Hartley later that day, meaning that the squad that set off to Hong Kong on 27 May consisted of 15 Welsh, 10 Irish, nine English and three Scottish players.

Alex Corbisiero was called up to the squad to replace Cian Healy, who suffered ankle ligament damage in the match against the Western Force, while Ryan Grant was called up to replace the injured Gethin Jenkins. Tommy Bowe broke his hand against the Queensland Reds, and Simon Zebo was brought into the squad. England's Brad Barritt, Christian Wade and Billy Twelvetrees were called in to provide further cover for the backs.

Gatland made a surprise selection on 16 June, calling up former Wales wing Shane Williams for the game against the Brumbies. Williams, playing club rugby in Japan, was already due to travel to Australia as a radio commentator, and was brought into the squad for only three days.

Ireland prop Tom Court was called up on 23 June before the final mid-week fixture against Melbourne Rebels, allowing Mako Vunipola to miss that match. Alex Corbisiero had injured his calf in the first test, so the Lions faced a shortage of props. Court was already in Australia visiting his home town of Brisbane.

O'Connell and Warburton were injured in the first and second tests respectively, ruling them out of playing in any more games in the tour.

Notes: Ages listed are as of the first tour match on 1 June. Bold denotes that the player was selected for a previous Lions squad.

Player	Position	Date of birth (age)	National team	Club/province	Notes
Rory Best	Hooker	15 August 1982 (aged 30)	Ireland	Ulster	Replaced Dylan Hartley
Dylan Hartley	Hooker	24 March 1986 (aged 27)	England	Northampton Saints	Originally selected, suspended before tour
Richard Hibbard	Hooker	13 December 1983 (aged 29)	Wales	Ospreys	
Tom Youngs	Hooker	28 January 1987 (aged 26)	England	Leicester Tigers	
Dan Cole	Prop	9 May 1987 (aged 26)	England	Leicester Tigers	
Alex Corbisiero	Prop	30 August 1988 (aged 24)	England	London Irish	Replaced Cian Healy
Tom Court	Prop	6 November 1980 (aged 32)	Ireland	Ulster	Called up to cover props
Ryan Grant	Prop	8 October 1985 (aged 27)	Scotland	Glasgow Warriors	Replaced Gethin Jenkins
Cian Healy	Prop	7 October 1987 (aged 25)	Ireland	Leinster	Withdrew due to ankle injury
**Gethin Jenkins**	Prop	17 November 1980 (aged 32)	Wales	Toulon	Withdrew due to calf injury
**Adam Jones**	Prop	8 March 1981 (aged 32)	Wales	Ospreys	
**Matt Stevens**	Prop	1 October 1982 (aged 30)	England	Saracens	
Mako Vunipola	Prop	13 January 1991 (aged 22)	England	Saracens	
Ian Evans	Lock	4 October 1984 (aged 28)	Wales	Ospreys	
Richie Gray	Lock	24 August 1989 (aged 23)	Scotland	Unattached	
**Alun Wyn Jones**	Lock	19 September 1985 (aged 27)	Wales	Ospreys	
**Paul O'Connell**	Lock	20 October 1979 (aged 33)	Ireland	Munster	
Geoff Parling	Lock	28 October 1983 (aged 29)	England	Leicester Tigers	
**Tom Croft**	Flanker	7 November 1985 (aged 27)	England	Leicester Tigers	
Dan Lydiate	Flanker	18 December 1987 (aged 25)	Wales	Newport Gwent Dragons	
Seán O'Brien	Flanker	14 February 1987 (aged 26)	Ireland	Leinster	
Justin Tipuric	Flanker	6 August 1989 (aged 23)	Wales	Ospreys	
Sam Warburton (c)	Flanker	5 October 1988 (aged 24)	Wales	Cardiff Blues	
Taulupe Faletau	No. 8	12 November 1990 (aged 22)	Wales	Newport Gwent Dragons	
**Jamie Heaslip**	No. 8	15 December 1983 (aged 29)	Ireland	Leinster	
Conor Murray	Scrum-half	20 April 1989 (aged 24)	Ireland	Munster	
**Mike Phillips**	Scrum-half	29 August 1982 (aged 30)	Wales	Bayonne	
Ben Youngs	Scrum-half	5 September 1989 (aged 23)	England	Leicester Tigers	
Owen Farrell	Fly-half	24 September 1991 (aged 21)	England	Saracens	
Johnny Sexton	Fly-half	11 July 1985 (aged 27)	Ireland	Leinster	
Brad Barritt	Centre	7 August 1986 (aged 26)	England	Saracens	Called up as backline cover
Jonathan Davies	Centre	5 April 1988 (aged 25)	Wales	Scarlets	
**Brian O'Driscoll**	Centre	21 January 1979 (aged 34)	Ireland	Leinster	
**Jamie Roberts**	Centre	8 November 1986 (aged 26)	Wales	Cardiff Blues	
Manu Tuilagi	Centre	18 May 1991 (aged 22)	England	Leicester Tigers	
Billy Twelvetrees	Centre	26 March 1988 (aged 25)	England	Gloucester	Called up as backline cover
**Tommy Bowe**	Wing	22 February 1984 (aged 29)	Ireland	Ulster	
Alex Cuthbert	Wing	5 April 1990 (aged 23)	Wales	Cardiff Blues	
Christian Wade	Wing	15 May 1991 (aged 22)	England	London Wasps	Called up as backline cover
Sean Maitland	Wing	14 September 1988 (aged 24)	Scotland	Glasgow Warriors	
George North	Wing	13 April 1992 (aged 21)	Wales	Scarlets	
**Shane Williams**	Wing	26 February 1977 (aged 36)	Wales	Mitsubishi Sagamihara DynaBoars	Called up for Brumbies match
Simon Zebo	Wing	16 March 1990 (aged 23)	Ireland	Munster	Called up to cover Tommy Bowe
**Leigh Halfpenny**	Full-back	22 December 1988 (aged 24)	Wales	Cardiff Blues	
Stuart Hogg	Full-back	24 June 1992 (aged 20)	Scotland	Glasgow Warriors	
**Rob Kearney**	Full-back	26 March 1986 (aged 27)	Ireland	Leinster	

==== Management and staff ====
Andy Irvine was the Lions' tour manager, having succeeded Gerald Davies, who became Lions chairman.

Although Irvine originally stated that it was unlikely that a current coach of one of the Home unions would be appointed to coach the Lions, New Zealander Warren Gatland was offered the role in March 2012 with the Welsh Rugby Union's support, before being confirmed in September 2012. Gatland promised impartial selection and said he believed that Graham Henry in 2001 picked too many Welsh players who were not good enough to go on the tour. Gatland signed a 10-month contract with the Lions, taking a sabbatical from coaching Wales.

Role	Name
Management
CEO	John Feehan
Chairman	Gerald Davies
Tour Manager	Andy Irvine
Coaching and conditioning
Head coach	Warren Gatland
Assistant coach (Attack)	Rob Howley
Assistant coach (Forwards)	Graham Rowntree
Assistant coach (Defence)	Andy Farrell
Assistant coach (Kicking)	Neil Jenkins
Head of Strength & Conditioning	Adam Beard
Fitness coach	Paul Stridgeon
Sports scientist	Brian Cunniffe
Head of Performance Analysis	Rhys Long
Video analyst	Rhodri Bown
Video analyst	Michael Hughes
Medical
Head doctor	James Robson
Masseur	Richard Wegrzyk
Physiotherapist	Bob Stewart
Physiotherapist	Prav Mathema
Physiotherapist	Phil Pask
Doctor	Eanna Falvey

=== Australia ===
Australia head coach Robbie Deans selected a 31-man squad for the test series against the Lions, to be captained by James Horwill.

Luke Morahan was added to the squad following an injury Joe Tomane sustained in training.

Following the first test, George Smith, Jesse Mogg and Ben Tapuai were called up to the squad.

Player	Position	Date of birth (age)	Caps	Club/province
Saia Fainga'a	Hooker	2 February 1987 (aged 26)	18	Queensland Reds
Stephen Moore	Hooker	20 January 1983 (aged 30)	76	Brumbies
Ben Alexander	Prop	13 November 1984 (aged 28)	48	Brumbies
Sekope Kepu	Prop	5 February 1986 (aged 27)	23	NSW Waratahs
Benn Robinson	Prop	19 July 1984 (aged 28)	56	NSW Waratahs
Scott Sio	Prop	16 October 1991 (aged 21)	0	Brumbies
James Slipper	Prop	6 June 1989 (aged 24)	34	Queensland Reds
Kane Douglas	Lock	1 June 1989 (aged 24)	6	NSW Waratahs
James Horwill (c)	Lock	29 May 1985 (aged 28)	35	Queensland Reds
Hugh McMeniman	Lock	1 November 1983 (aged 29)	21	Western Force
Rob Simmons	Lock	19 April 1989 (aged 24)	23	Queensland Reds
Dave Dennis	Flanker	10 January 1986 (aged 27)	15	NSW Waratahs
Liam Gill	Flanker	8 June 1992 (aged 21)	8	Queensland Reds
Michael Hooper	Flanker	29 October 1991 (aged 21)	13	NSW Waratahs
Peter Kimlin	Flanker	11 July 1985 (aged 27)	2	Brumbies
Ben McCalman	Flanker	18 March 1988 (aged 25)	21	Western Force
George Smith	Flanker	14 July 1980 (aged 32)	110	Brumbies
Ben Mowen	Number 8	1 December 1984 (aged 28)	0	Brumbies
Wycliff Palu	Number 8	27 July 1982 (aged 30)	46	NSW Waratahs
Will Genia	Scrum-half	17 January 1988 (aged 25)	41	Queensland Reds
Nick Phipps	Scrum-half	1 September 1989 (aged 23)	12	Melbourne Rebels
Kurtley Beale	Fly-half	6 January 1989 (aged 24)	36	Melbourne Rebels
James O'Connor	Fly-half	5 July 1990 (aged 22)	37	Melbourne Rebels
Adam Ashley-Cooper	Centre	27 March 1984 (aged 29)	77	NSW Waratahs
Rob Horne	Centre	15 August 1989 (aged 23)	14	NSW Waratahs
Christian Lealiifano	Centre	24 September 1987 (aged 25)	0	Brumbies
Pat McCabe	Centre	21 March 1988 (aged 25)	19	Brumbies
Ben Tapuai	Centre	19 January 1989 (aged 24)	7	Queensland Reds
Nick Cummins	Wing	5 October 1987 (aged 25)	6	Western Force
Digby Ioane	Wing	14 July 1985 (aged 27)	34	Queensland Reds
Joe Tomane	Wing	11 February 1990 (aged 23)	1	Brumbies
Luke Morahan	Wing	13 April 1990 (age 36)	1	Queensland Reds
Berrick Barnes	Fullback	28 May 1986 (aged 27)	50	NSW Waratahs
Israel Folau	Fullback	3 April 1989 (aged 24)	0	NSW Waratahs
Jesse Mogg	Fullback	8 June 1989 (aged 24)	0	Brumbies

== Match details ==
1 June 2013
19:30 HKT (UTC+8)

British & Irish Lions	59–8	Barbarians
Try: O'Connell 27' c Phillips (2) 31' c, 42' c Davies 57' c Cuthbert (2) 60', 68'; Lydiate 74'; A.W. Jones 80+1' m Con: Farrell (3/3) 27', 32', 43'; Sexton (2/5) 58', 76'; Pen: Farrell (3/4) 3', 20', 40'	Report	Try: Fotuali'i 56' m Pen: Daly (1/1) 15'

Hong Kong Stadium, Hong Kong
Attendance: 28,643
Referee: Steve Walsh (Australia)

Team details

FB	15	(Scotland) Stuart Hogg
RW	14	(Wales) Alex Cuthbert
OC	13	(Wales) Jonathan Davies
IC	12	(Wales) Jamie Roberts	(substituted off) 66'
LW	11	(Scotland) Sean Maitland
FH	10	(England) Owen Farrell	(substituted off) 57'
SH	9	(Wales) Mike Phillips	(substituted off) 57'
N8	8	(Wales) Taulupe Faletau	(substituted off) 62'
OF	7	(Wales) Justin Tipuric
BF	6	(Wales) Dan Lydiate
RL	5	(Ireland) Paul O'Connell (c)	27' to 36'		(substituted off) 62'
LL	4	(Scotland) Richie Gray
TP	3	(Wales) Adam Jones	(substituted off) 54'
HK	2	(Wales) Richard Hibbard	(substituted off) 52'
LP	1	(England) Mako Vunipola	(substituted off) 54'
Replacements:
HK	16	(England) Tom Youngs	(substituted on) 52'
PR	17	(Ireland) Cian Healy	(substituted on) 54'
PR	18	(England) Matt Stevens	(substituted on) 54'
LK	19	(Wales) Alun Wyn Jones	(substituted on) 27'	(substituted off) 36'	(substituted on) 62'
N8	20	(Ireland) Jamie Heaslip	(substituted on) 62'
SH	21	(Ireland) Conor Murray	(substituted on) 57'
FH	22	(Ireland) Johnny Sexton	(substituted on) 57'
WG	23	(Wales) George North	(substituted on) 66'
Coach:
(New Zealand) Warren Gatland

FB	15	(New Zealand) Jared Payne
RW	14	(New Zealand) Joe Rokocoko
OC	13	(England) Elliot Daly
IC	12	(New Zealand) Casey Laulala		(substituted off) 68'
LW	11	(United States) Takudzwa Ngwenya		(substituted off) 59'
FH	10	(New Zealand) Nick Evans
SH	9	(France) Dimitri Yachvili		(substituted off) 52'
N8	8	(Italy) Sergio Parisse (c)
OF	7	(England) Sam Jones
BF	6	(United States) Samu Manoa		(substituted off) 10'	(substituted on) 19'
RL	5	(Australia) Dean Mumm		(substituted off) 52'
LL	4	(South Africa) Marco Wentzel		(substituted off) 59'
TP	3	(Italy) Martin Castrogiovanni		(substituted off) 68'
HK	2	(South Africa) Schalk Brits	(yellow card) 7' to 17'			(substituted off) 44'
LP	1	(Wales) Paul James		(substituted off) 57'
Replacements:
HK	16	(Italy) Leonardo Ghiraldini		(substituted on) 10'	(substituted off) 19'	(substituted on) 44'
PR	17	(Wales) Duncan Jones		(substituted on) 57'
PR	18	(Italy) Andrea Lo Cicero		(substituted on) 68'
LK	19	(Scotland) Jim Hamilton		(substituted on) 59'
N8	20	(France) Imanol Harinordoquy		(substituted on) 52'
SH	21	(Samoa) Kahn Fotuali'i		(substituted on) 52'
FH	22	(Wales) James Hook		(substituted on) 68'
WG	23	(England) Mike Tindall		(substituted on) 59'
Coach:
(Wales) Dai Young

Man of the Match:
Mike Phillips (British & Irish Lions)

Touch judges:
Lourens van der Merwe (South Africa)
Angus Gardner (Australia)
Television match official:
Matt Goddard (Australia)

5 June 2013
18:00 AWST (UTC+8)

Western Force	17–69	British & Irish Lions
Try: R. Brown 46' c McCaffrey 62' c Con: Sheehan (2/2) 47', 63'; Pen: Sheehan (1/1) 32'	Report	Try: Sexton 10' c O'Driscoll (2) 33' c, 64' c Croft 40' c Heaslip 42' c Vunipola 50' c Bowe 58' c Farrell 65' c Parling 75' c Con: Halfpenny (9/9) 11', 34', 40', 43', 51', 59', 64', 66', 76'; Pen: Halfpenny (2/2) 3', 36'

Subiaco Oval, Perth
Attendance: 35,103
Referee: Glen Jackson (New Zealand)

Team details

FB	15	Sam Christie
RW	14	Dane Haylett-Petty		(substituted off) 71'
OC	13	Ed Stubbs	(yellow card) 57' to 67'
IC	12	Chris Tuatara-Morrison
LW	11	Corey Brown		(substituted off) 61'
FH	10	Sam Norton-Knight
SH	9	Brett Sheehan		(substituted off) 71'
N8	8	Richard Brown
OF	7	Matt Hodgson (c)
BF	6	Angus Cottrell		(substituted off) 52'
RL	5	Phoenix Battye
LL	4	Toby Lynn		(substituted off) 65'
TP	3	Salesi Ma'afu		(substituted off) 49'
HK	2	James Hilterbrand		(substituted off) 78'
LP	1	Salesi Manu		(substituted off) 77'
Replacements:
HK	16	Hugh Roach		(substituted on) 78'
PR	17	Sione Kolo		(substituted on) 49'
PR	18	Tim Metcher		(substituted on) 77'
LK	19	Ben Matwijow		(substituted on) 65'
FL	20	Lachlan McCaffrey		(substituted on) 52'
SH	21	Alby Mathewson		(substituted on) 71'
WG	22	Nick Haining		(substituted on) 61'
CE	23	Junior Rasolea		(substituted on) 71'
Coach:
(Australia) Michael Foley

FB	15	(Wales) Leigh Halfpenny
RW	14	(Ireland) Tommy Bowe		(substituted off) 77'
OC	13	(Ireland) Brian O'Driscoll (c)
IC	12	(England) Manu Tuilagi
LW	11	(Wales) George North
FH	10	(Ireland) Johnny Sexton		(substituted off) 65'
SH	9	(Ireland) Conor Murray		(substituted off) 65'
N8	8	(Ireland) Jamie Heaslip
OF	7	(Ireland) Seán O'Brien
BF	6	(England) Tom Croft		(substituted off) 71'
RL	5	(Wales) Ian Evans		(substituted off) 59'
LL	4	(Wales) Alun Wyn Jones	(yellow card) 71' to end'
TP	3	(England) Dan Cole		(substituted off) 67'
HK	2	(Ireland) Rory Best		(substituted off) 59'
LP	1	(Ireland) Cian Healy		(substituted off) 36'
Replacements:
HK	16	(England) Tom Youngs		(substituted on) 59'
PR	17	(England) Mako Vunipola		(substituted on) 36'
PR	18	(England) Matt Stevens		(substituted on) 67'
LK	19	(England) Geoff Parling		(substituted on) 59'
N8	20	(Wales) Taulupe Faletau		(substituted on) 71'
SH	21	(England) Ben Youngs		(substituted on) 65'
FH	22	(England) Owen Farrell		(substituted on) 65'
WG	23	(Scotland) Sean Maitland		(substituted on) 77'
Coach:
(New Zealand) Warren Gatland

Man of the Match:
Jamie Heaslip (British & Irish Lions)

Touch judges:
Jaco Peyper (South Africa)
Garratt Williamson (New Zealand)
Television match official:
Glenn Newman (New Zealand)

8 June 2013
19:30 AEST (UTC+10)

Queensland Reds	12–22	British & Irish Lions
Try: Morahan 17' c Frisby 62' m Con: Cooper (1/1) 17'	Report	Try: B. Youngs 33' c Con: Farrell (1/1) 34'; Pen: Farrell (5/5) 13', 22', 40', 50', 76'

Lang Park, Brisbane
Attendance: 50,136
Referee: Jérôme Garcès (France)

Team details

FB	15	Ben Lucas		(substituted off) 69'
RW	14	Rodney Davies
OC	13	Ben Tapuai
IC	12	Anthony Fainga'a	(substituted off) 52'
LW	11	Luke Morahan	(substituted off) 43'
FH	10	Quade Cooper (c)
SH	9	Nick Frisby	(substituted off) 63'	(substituted on) 69'
N8	8	Jake Schatz
OF	7	Beau Robinson	(substituted off) 53'
BF	6	Ed Quirk
RL	5	Ed O'Donoghue	12' to 18'
LL	4	Adam Wallace-Harrison			(substituted off) 53'
TP	3	Greg Holmes	35' to 40'		(substituted off) 68'
HK	2	James Hanson
LP	1	Ben Daley	(substituted off) 22'
Replacements:
HK	16	Albert Anae	(substituted on) 22'	(substituted off) 77'
PR	17	Sam Denny		(substituted on) 77'
PR	18	Jono Owen	(substituted on) 35'	(substituted off) 40'	(substituted on) 68'
FL	19	Radike Samo	(substituted on) 12'	(substituted off) 18'	(substituted on) 53'
N8	20	Jarrad Butler	(substituted on) 53'
CE	21	Jono Lance	(substituted on) 63'
FH	22	Mike Harris	(substituted on) 52'
WG	23	Dom Shipperley	(substituted on) 43'
Coach:
(Australia) Ewen McKenzie

FB	15	(Scotland) Stuart Hogg
RW	14	(Wales) Alex Cuthbert
OC	13	(England) Manu Tuilagi	(substituted off) 19'
IC	12	(Wales) Jonathan Davies
LW	11	(Ireland) Tommy Bowe	(substituted off) 45'
FH	10	(England) Owen Farrell
SH	9	(England) Ben Youngs
N8	8	(Wales) Taulupe Faletau
OF	7	(Wales) Sam Warburton (c)	(substituted off) 73'
BF	6	(Wales) Dan Lydiate
RL	5	(England) Geoff Parling
LL	4	(Scotland) Richie Gray	(substituted off) 64'
TP	3	(England) Matt Stevens	(substituted off) 71'
HK	2	(England) Tom Youngs	(substituted off) 64'
LP	1	(England) Mako Vunipola	(substituted off) 64'
Replacements:
HK	16	(Wales) Richard Hibbard	(substituted on) 64'
PR	17	(England) Dan Cole	(substituted on) 64'
PR	18	(Wales) Adam Jones	(substituted on) 71'
LK	19	(Ireland) Paul O'Connell	(substituted on) 64'
FL	20	(Wales) Justin Tipuric	(substituted on) 73'
SH	21	(Ireland) Conor Murray
FH	22	(Ireland) Johnny Sexton	(substituted on) 45'
WG	23	(Wales) George North	(substituted on) 19'
Coach:
(New Zealand) Warren Gatland

Man of the Match:
George North (British & Irish Lions)

Touch judges:
Jérôme Garcès (France)
Garratt Williamson (New Zealand)
Television match official:
Glenn Newman (New Zealand)

11 June 2013
19:30 AEST (UTC+10)

NSW/QLD Combined Country	0–64	British & Irish Lions
	Report	Try: Cuthbert 7' c Murray 9' c Hogg 11' m North (2) 19' c, 32' m Hibbard 26' c O'Driscoll 49' m Halfpenny 55' c O'Brien 65' c Davies 79' c Con: Hogg (4/6) 8', 10', 20', 27'; Halfpenny (3/4) 56', 66', 80'

Newcastle International Sports Centre, Newcastle
Attendance: 20,071
Referee: Steve Walsh (Australia)

Team details

FB	15	Nathan Trist
RW	14	Alex Gibbon
OC	13	Lewie Catt	(substituted off) 62'
IC	12	Tereta-Junior Siakisini
LW	11	Tom Cox	(substituted off) 57'
FH	10	Angus Roberts
SH	9	Michael Snowden	(substituted off) 72'
N8	8	Tim Davidson (c)
OF	7	Jarrad Butler
BF	6	Richard Stanford		(substituted off) 64'
RL	5	Blake Enever
LL	4	Phoenix Battye	(substituted off) 50'	(substituted on) 64'	(substituted off) 72'
TP	3	Tim Metcher	(substituted off) 68'
HK	2	Joshua Mann-Rea	(substituted off) 61'
LP	1	Haydn Hirsimaki	(substituted off) 53'
Replacements:
HK	16	Tom Kearney	(substituted on) 61'
PR	17	Dylan Evans	(substituted on) 53'
PR	18	Rikki Abraham	(substituted on) 68'
LK	19	Rory Arnold			(substituted on) 72'
N8	20	Trent Dyer	(substituted on) 50'
SH	21	Adam McCormack	(substituted on) 72'
FH	22	Shaun McCarthy	(substituted on) 57'
WG	23	Dale Ah-Wang	(substituted on) 62'
Coach:
(Australia) Cam Blades

FB	15	(Scotland) Sean Maitland
RW	14	(Wales) Alex Cuthbert
OC	13	(Ireland) Brian O'Driscoll (c)
IC	12	(Wales) Jamie Roberts	(substituted off) 57'
LW	11	(Wales) George North	(substituted off) 40'
FH	10	(Scotland) Stuart Hogg
SH	9	(Ireland) Conor Murray	(substituted off) 68'
N8	8	(Ireland) Jamie Heaslip	(substituted off) 53'
OF	7	(Wales) Justin Tipuric
BF	6	(Ireland) Seán O'Brien
RL	5	(Wales) Ian Evans
LL	4	(Scotland) Richie Gray	(substituted off) 40'
TP	3	(England) Dan Cole	(substituted off) 50'
HK	2	(Wales) Richard Hibbard	(substituted off) 50'
LP	1	(England) Alex Corbisiero	(substituted off) 50'
Replacements:
HK	16	(Ireland) Rory Best	(substituted on) 50'
PR	17	(Scotland) Ryan Grant	(substituted on) 50'
PR	18	(England) Matt Stevens	(substituted on) 50'
LK	19	(Wales) Alun Wyn Jones	(substituted on) 40'
N8	20	(Wales) Taulupe Faletau	(substituted on) 53'
SH	21	(Wales) Mike Phillips	(substituted on) 68'
CE	22	(Wales) Jonathan Davies	(substituted on) 57'
FB	23	(Wales) Leigh Halfpenny	(substituted on) 40'
Coach:
(New Zealand) Warren Gatland

Man of the Match:
Stuart Hogg (British & Irish Lions)

Touch judges:
Angus Gardner (Australia)
James Leckie (Australia)
Television match official:
Matt Goddard (Australia)

15 June 2013
19:40 AEST (UTC+10)

New South Wales Waratahs	17–47	British & Irish Lions
Try: Carter (2) 13' c, 45' c Con: McKibbin (2/2) 15', 46'; Pen: McKibbin (1/1) 33'	Report	Try: Sexton 5' c Halfpenny (2) 39' c, 43' c Croft 54' c Davies 71' c Con: Halfpenny (4/4) 7', 40', 44', 54'; Farrell (1/1) 72'; Pen: Halfpenny (4/4) 3', 18', 26', 51'

Sydney Football Stadium, Sydney
Attendance: 40,805
Referee: Jaco Peyper (South Africa)

Team details

FB	15	Drew Mitchell
RW	14	Cam Crawford
OC	13	Rob Horne
IC	12	Tom Carter	(substituted off) 46'
LW	11	Peter Betham	(substituted off) 72'
FH	10	Bernard Foley
SH	9	Brendan McKibbin	(substituted off) 72'
N8	8	Dave Dennis (c)
OF	7	Pat McCutcheon	(substituted off) 55'
BF	6	Jed Holloway	(substituted off) 49'
RL	5	Ollie Atkins
LL	4	Will Skelton
TP	3	Paddy Ryan	(substituted off) 72'
HK	2	John Ulugia	(substituted off) 72'
LP	1	Jeremy Tilse	(substituted off) 72'
Replacements:
HK	16	Luke Holmes	(substituted on) 72'
PR	17	Richard Aho	(substituted on) 72'
PR	18	Sam Talakai	(substituted on) 72'
N8	19	Lopeti Timani	(substituted on) 49'
FL	20	AJ Gilbert	(substituted on) 55'
SH	21	Matt Lucas	(substituted on) 72'
FH	22	Ben Volavola	(substituted on) 72'
WG	23	Tom Kingston	(substituted on) 46'
Coach:
(Australia) Michael Cheika

FB	15	(Wales) Leigh Halfpenny	(substituted off) 58'
RW	14	(Scotland) Sean Maitland
OC	13	(Wales) Jonathan Davies
IC	12	(Wales) Jamie Roberts
LW	11	(Ireland) Simon Zebo
FH	10	(Ireland) Johnny Sexton	(substituted off) 49'
SH	9	(Wales) Mike Phillips	(substituted off) 58'
N8	8	(Ireland) Jamie Heaslip
OF	7	(Wales) Sam Warburton (c)
BF	6	(England) Tom Croft	(substituted off) 58'
RL	5	(Ireland) Paul O'Connell	(substituted off) 58'
LL	4	(Wales) Alun Wyn Jones
TP	3	(Wales) Adam Jones	(substituted off) 58'
HK	2	(England) Tom Youngs	(substituted off) 58'
LP	1	(England) Mako Vunipola	(substituted off) 58'
Replacements:
HK	16	(Wales) Richard Hibbard	(substituted on) 58'
PR	17	(England) Alex Corbisiero	(substituted on) 58'
PR	18	(England) Dan Cole	(substituted on) 58'
LK	19	(England) Geoff Parling	(substituted on) 58'
FL	20	(Wales) Dan Lydiate	(substituted on) 58'
SH	21	(England) Ben Youngs	(substituted on) 58'
FH	22	(England) Owen Farrell	(substituted on) 49'
FB	23	(Ireland) Rob Kearney	(substituted on) 58'
Coach:
(New Zealand) Warren Gatland

Man of the Match:
Jonathan Davies (British & Irish Lions)

Touch judges:
Jérôme Garcès (France)
Glen Jackson (New Zealand)
Television match official:
Keith Brown (New Zealand)

18 June 2013
19:40 AEST (UTC+10)

Brumbies	14–12	British & Irish Lions
Try: Kuridrani 4' m Pen: Mogg (3/4) 39', 45', 53'	Report	Pen: Hogg (2/4) 40+2', 55'; Farrell (2/2) 63', 71'

Canberra Stadium, Canberra
Attendance: 21,655
Referee: Jérôme Garcès (France)

Team details

FB	15	Jesse Mogg
RW	14	Henry Speight
OC	13	Tevita Kuridrani
IC	12	Andrew Smith	(substituted off) 75'
LW	11	Clyde Rathbone	(substituted off) 71'
FH	10	Matt To'omua
SH	9	Ian Prior
N8	8	Peter Kimlin (c)
OF	7	Colby Fainga'a
BF	6	Scott Fardy
RL	5	Sam Carter	(substituted off) 67'
LL	4	Leon Power	(substituted off) 75'
TP	3	Scott Sio
HK	2	Siliva Siliva	(substituted off) 56'
LP	1	Ruan Smith
Replacements:
HK	16	Joshua Mann-Rea	(substituted on) 56'
PR	17	JP Smith
PR	18	Chris Cocca
LK	19	Etienne Oosthuizen	(substituted on) 75'
FL	20	Jordan Smiler	(substituted on) 67'
SH	21	Mark Swanepoel
FH	22	Robbie Coleman	(substituted on) 71'
CE	23	Zack Holmes	(substituted on) 75'
Coach:
(South Africa) Jake White

FB	15	(Ireland) Rob Kearney
RW	14	(England) Christian Wade
OC	13	(England) Brad Barritt
IC	12	(England) Billy Twelvetrees
LW	11	(Wales) Shane Williams	(substituted off) 68'
FH	10	(Scotland) Stuart Hogg	(substituted off) 59'
SH	9	(England) Ben Youngs	(substituted off) 59'
N8	8	(Wales) Taulupe Faletau
OF	7	(Wales) Justin Tipuric
BF	6	(Ireland) Seán O'Brien	(substituted off) 56'
RL	5	(Scotland) Richie Gray
LL	4	(Wales) Ian Evans	(substituted off) 59'
TP	3	(England) Matt Stevens	(substituted off) 56'
HK	2	(Ireland) Rory Best (c)	(substituted off) 56'
LP	1	(Scotland) Ryan Grant	(substituted off) 56'
Replacements:
HK	16	(Wales) Richard Hibbard	(substituted on) 56'
PR	17	(England) Alex Corbisiero	(substituted on) 56'
PR	18	(England) Dan Cole	(substituted on) 56'
LK	19	(England) Geoff Parling	(substituted on) 59'
FL	20	(Wales) Dan Lydiate	(substituted on) 56'
SH	21	(Ireland) Conor Murray	(substituted on) 59'
FH	22	(England) Owen Farrell	(substituted on) 59'
WG	23	(Ireland) Simon Zebo	(substituted on) 68'
Coach:
(New Zealand) Warren Gatland

Man of the Match:
Tevita Kuridrani (Brumbies)

Touch judges:
Glen Jackson (New Zealand)
Jaco Peyper (South Africa)
Television match official:
Keith Brown (New Zealand)

First test

22 June 2013
20:05 AEST (UTC+10)

Australia	21–23	British & Irish Lions
Try: Folau (2) 12' c, 34' m Con: O'Connor (1/2) 13'; Pen: O'Connor (1/3) 51'; Beale (2/4) 61', 68'	Report	Try: North 25' c Cuthbert 48' c Con: Halfpenny (2/2) 27', 48'; Pen: Halfpenny (3/4) 23', 31', 65'

Suncorp Stadium, Brisbane
Attendance: 52,499
Referee: Chris Pollock (New Zealand)

FB	15	Berrick Barnes	(substituted off) 38'
RW	14	Israel Folau
OC	13	Adam Ashley-Cooper	(substituted off) 76'
IC	12	Christian Lealiifano	(substituted off) 1'
LW	11	Digby Ioane
FH	10	James O'Connor
SH	9	Will Genia
N8	8	Wycliff Palu
OF	7	Michael Hooper
BF	6	Ben Mowen
RL	5	James Horwill (c)
LL	4	Kane Douglas	(substituted off) 68'
TP	3	Ben Alexander	(substituted off) 57'
HK	2	Stephen Moore
LP	1	Benn Robinson	(substituted off) 68'
Replacements:
HK	16	Saia Fainga'a
PR	17	James Slipper	(substituted on) 68'
PR	18	Sekope Kepu	(substituted on) 57'
LK	19	Rob Simmons	(substituted on) 68'
FL	20	Liam Gill		(substituted on) 46'
SH	21	Nick Phipps	(substituted on) 76'
CE	22	Pat McCabe	(substituted on) 1'	(substituted off) 46'
FH	23	Kurtley Beale	(substituted on) 38'
Coach:
(New Zealand) Robbie Deans

FB	15	(Wales) Leigh Halfpenny
RW	14	(Wales) Alex Cuthbert
OC	13	(Ireland) Brian O'Driscoll
IC	12	(Wales) Jonathan Davies
LW	11	(Wales) George North
FH	10	(Ireland) Johnny Sexton
SH	9	(Wales) Mike Phillips	(substituted off) 62'
N8	8	(Ireland) Jamie Heaslip
OF	7	(Wales) Sam Warburton (c)
BF	6	(England) Tom Croft	(substituted off) 72'
RL	5	(Ireland) Paul O'Connell
LL	4	(Wales) Alun Wyn Jones	(substituted off) 70'
TP	3	(Wales) Adam Jones	(substituted off) 51'
HK	2	(England) Tom Youngs	(substituted off) 64'
LP	1	(England) Alex Corbisiero	(substituted off) 51'
Replacements:
HK	16	(Wales) Richard Hibbard	(substituted on) 64'
PR	17	(England) Mako Vunipola	(substituted on) 51'
PR	18	(England) Dan Cole	(substituted on) 51'
LK	19	(England) Geoff Parling	(substituted on) 70'
FL	20	(Wales) Dan Lydiate	(substituted on) 72'
SH	21	(England) Ben Youngs	(substituted on) 62'
FH	22	(England) Owen Farrell
WG	23	(Scotland) Sean Maitland
Coach:
(New Zealand) Warren Gatland

Man of the Match:
Israel Folau (Australia)

Touch judges:
Craig Joubert (South Africa)
Romain Poite (France)
Television match official:
Vinny Munro (New Zealand)

25 June 2013
19:40 AEST (UTC+10)

Melbourne Rebels	0–35	British & Irish Lions
	Report	Try: Murray 15' c Maitland 27' c O'Brien 49' c Penalty try 62' c B. Youngs 72' c Con: Farrell (3/3) 16', 28', 50'; Hogg (2/2) 63', 73'

Melbourne Rectangular Stadium, Melbourne
Attendance: 28,648
Referee: Glen Jackson (New Zealand)

Team details

FB	15	Jason Woodward
RW	14	Tom English
OC	13	Mitch Inman		(substituted off) 52'
IC	12	Rory Sidey
LW	11	Lachlan Mitchell
FH	10	Bryce Hegarty		(substituted off) 72'
SH	9	Luke Burgess		(substituted off) 55'
N8	8	Gareth Delve (c)		(substituted off) 55'
OF	7	Scott Fuglistaller
BF	6	Jarrod Saffy
RL	5	Hugh Pyle		(substituted off) 41'
LL	4	Cadeyrn Neville
TP	3	Laurie Weeks		(substituted off) 60'
HK	2	Ged Robinson		(substituted off) 60'
LP	1	Nic Henderson		(substituted off) 60'
Replacements:
HK	16	Patrick Leafa		(substituted on) 60'
PR	17	Cruze Ah-Nau		(substituted on) 60'
PR	18	Paul Alo-Emile		(substituted on) 60'
LK	19	Luke Jones		(substituted on) 41'
FL	20	Jordy Reid	(yellow card) 62' to 72'	(substituted on) 55'
SH	21	Nic Stirzaker		(substituted on) 55'
FB	22	Angus Roberts		(substituted on) 72'
WG	23	Cooper Vuna		(substituted on) 52'
Coach:
(Australia) Damien Hill

FB	15	(Ireland) Rob Kearney			(substituted off) 60'
RW	14	(Scotland) Sean Maitland
OC	13	(England) Manu Tuilagi
IC	12	(England) Brad Barritt	32' to 40'
LW	11	(Ireland) Simon Zebo
FH	10	(England) Owen Farrell	(substituted off) 51'
SH	9	(Ireland) Conor Murray	(substituted off) 63'
N8	8	(Wales) Taulupe Faletau
OF	7	(Ireland) Seán O'Brien	(substituted off) 55'
BF	6	(Wales) Dan Lydiate (c)	(substituted off) 65'
RL	5	(Wales) Ian Evans
LL	4	(Scotland) Richie Gray
TP	3	(England) Dan Cole	(substituted off) 55'
HK	2	(Wales) Richard Hibbard	(substituted off) 55'
LP	1	(Scotland) Ryan Grant	(substituted off) 55'
Replacements:
HK	16	(Ireland) Rory Best	(substituted on) 55'
PR	17	(Ireland) Tom Court	(substituted on) 55'
PR	18	(England) Matt Stevens	(substituted on) 55'
FL	19	(England) Tom Croft	(substituted on) 65'
FL	20	(Wales) Justin Tipuric	(substituted on) 55'
SH	21	(England) Ben Youngs	(substituted on) 63'
CE	22	(England) Billy Twelvetrees	(substituted on) 32'	(substituted off) 40'	(substituted on) 60'
FB	23	(Scotland) Stuart Hogg	(substituted on) 51'
Coach:
(New Zealand) Warren Gatland

Man of the Match:
Taulupe Faletau (British & Irish Lions)

Touch judges:
Romain Poite (France)
Craig Joubert (South Africa)
Television match official:
Ben Skeen (New Zealand)

Second test

29 June 2013
20:05 AEST (UTC+10)

Australia	16–15	British & Irish Lions
Try: Ashley-Cooper 74' c Con: Lealiifano (1/1) 76'; Pen: Lealiifano (3/3) 16', 23', 36	Report	Pen: Halfpenny (5/7) 9', 27', 32', 39', 62'

Docklands Stadium, Melbourne
Attendance: 56,771
Referee: Craig Joubert (South Africa)

FB	15	Kurtley Beale
RW	14	Israel Folau
OC	13	Adam Ashley-Cooper
IC	12	Christian Lealiifano
LW	11	Joe Tomane
FH	10	James O'Connor
SH	9	Will Genia
N8	8	Wycliff Palu	(substituted off) 60'
OF	7	Michael Hooper
BF	6	Ben Mowen
RL	5	James Horwill (c)
LL	4	Kane Douglas	(substituted off) 53'
TP	3	Ben Alexander	(substituted off) 58'
HK	2	Stephen Moore
LP	1	Benn Robinson	(substituted off) 60'	(substituted on) 76'
Replacements:
HK	16	Saia Fainga'a
PR	17	James Slipper	(substituted on) 60'	(substituted off) 76'
PR	18	Sekope Kepu	(substituted on) 58'
LK	19	Rob Simmons	(substituted on) 53'
FL	20	Liam Gill	(substituted on) 60'
SH	21	Nick Phipps
CE	22	Rob Horne
FB	23	Jesse Mogg
Coach:
(New Zealand) Robbie Deans

FB	15	(Wales) Leigh Halfpenny
RW	14	(Ireland) Tommy Bowe
OC	13	(Ireland) Brian O'Driscoll
IC	12	(Wales) Jonathan Davies
LW	11	(Wales) George North
FH	10	(Ireland) Johnny Sexton
SH	9	(England) Ben Youngs	(substituted off) 53'
N8	8	(Ireland) Jamie Heaslip	(substituted off) 62'
OF	7	(Wales) Sam Warburton (c)	(substituted off) 66'
BF	6	(Wales) Dan Lydiate
RL	5	(England) Geoff Parling
LL	4	(Wales) Alun Wyn Jones
TP	3	(Wales) Adam Jones	(substituted off) 58'
HK	2	(England) Tom Youngs	(substituted off) 56'
LP	1	(England) Mako Vunipola
Replacements:
HK	16	(Wales) Richard Hibbard	(substituted on) 56'
PR	17	(Scotland) Ryan Grant
PR	18	(England) Dan Cole	(substituted on) 58'
FL	19	(England) Tom Croft	(substituted on) 66'
FL	20	(Ireland) Seán O'Brien	(substituted on) 62'
SH	21	(Ireland) Conor Murray	(substituted on) 53'
FH	22	(England) Owen Farrell
WG	23	(Wales) Alex Cuthbert
Coach:
(New Zealand) Warren Gatland

Man of the Match
Christian Lealiifano (Australia)

Touch judges:
Chris Pollock (New Zealand)
Romain Poite (France)
Television match official:
Ben Skeen (New Zealand)

Third test

6 July 2013
20:00 AEST (UTC+10)

Australia	16–41	British & Irish Lions
Try: O'Connor 40' c Con: Lealiifano (1/1) 40'; Pen: Lealiifano (3/3) 8', 41', 45'	Report	Try: Corbisiero 1' c Sexton 57' c North 64' m Roberts 67' c Con: Halfpenny (3/4) 2', 57', 69'; Pen: Halfpenny (5/5) 7', 12', 15', 25', 51'

Stadium Australia, Sydney
Attendance: 83,702
Referee: Romain Poite (France)

FB	15	Kurtley Beale
RW	14	Israel Folau		(substituted off) 27'
OC	13	Adam Ashley-Cooper
IC	12	Christian Lealiifano
LW	11	Joe Tomane
FH	10	James O'Connor
SH	9	Will Genia		(substituted off) 70'
N8	8	Wycliff Palu		(substituted off) 60'
OF	7	George Smith		(substituted off) 4'	(substituted on) 9'	(substituted off) 27'	(substituted on) 35'	(substituted off) 66'
BF	6	Ben Mowen
RL	5	James Horwill (c)
LL	4	Kane Douglas		(substituted off) 62'
TP	3	Ben Alexander	(yellow card) 24' to 34'				(substituted off) 35'
HK	2	Stephen Moore		55' to 63'		(substituted off) 72'
LP	1	Benn Robinson		(substituted off) 66'
Replacements:
HK	16	Saia Fainga'a		(substituted on) 55'	(substituted off) 63'	(substituted on) 72'
PR	17	James Slipper		(substituted on) 66'
PR	18	Sekope Kepu				(substituted on) 27'
LK	19	Rob Simmons		(substituted on) 62'
FL	20	Ben McCalman		(substituted on) 60'
FL	21	Michael Hooper		(substituted on) 4'	(substituted off) 9'			(substituted on) 66'
SH	22	Nick Phipps		(substituted on) 70'
FB	23	Jesse Mogg		(substituted on) 27'
Coach:
(New Zealand) Robbie Deans

FB	15	(Wales) Leigh Halfpenny
RW	14	(Ireland) Tommy Bowe
OC	13	(Wales) Jonathan Davies
IC	12	(Wales) Jamie Roberts	(substituted off) 69'
LW	11	(Wales) George North
FH	10	(Ireland) Johnny Sexton	(substituted off) 63'
SH	9	(Wales) Mike Phillips	(substituted off) 51'
N8	8	(Wales) Taulupe Faletau	55' to 59'
OF	7	(Ireland) Seán O'Brien		(substituted off) 59'
BF	6	(Wales) Dan Lydiate
RL	5	(England) Geoff Parling	(substituted off) 67'
LL	4	(Wales) Alun Wyn Jones (c)
TP	3	(Wales) Adam Jones	(substituted off) 55'
HK	2	(Wales) Richard Hibbard	(substituted off) 47'
LP	1	(England) Alex Corbisiero	(substituted off) 67'
Replacements:
HK	16	(England) Tom Youngs	(substituted on) 47'
PR	17	(England) Mako Vunipola	(substituted on) 67'
PR	18	(England) Dan Cole	(substituted on) 55'
LK	19	(Scotland) Richie Gray	(substituted on) 67'
FL	20	(Wales) Justin Tipuric	(substituted on) 55'
SH	21	(Ireland) Conor Murray	(substituted on) 51'
FH	22	(England) Owen Farrell	(substituted on) 63'
CE	23	(England) Manu Tuilagi	(substituted on) 69'
Coach:
(New Zealand) Warren Gatland

Man of the Match
Leigh Halfpenny (British & Irish Lions)

Touch judges:
Chris Pollock (New Zealand)
Craig Joubert (South Africa)
Television match official:
Vinny Munro (New Zealand)

== Attendances ==
The tour drew record attendances to several of the 10 matches earning the distinction of the most attended tour in the game’s history, outside of a Rugby World Cup. Over the nine matches played on Australian soil there was a total attendance of 389,400. The Lions opened the tour in front of 28,643 for a game against the Barbarians at the Hong Kong Stadium. Their first game in Australia attracted 35,103 to Patersons Stadium for their opening match in Australia against the Western Force, while their next game against the Queensland Reds at Suncorp Stadium attracted a record Reds home attendance of 50,136. The game against the ACT Brumbies attracted 21,655 to Canberra Stadium for the Lions first loss of the tour. Three days before the game against the Brumbies, 40,805 saw the Lions thrash the New South Wales Waratahs 47–17 at the Sydney Football Stadium. In the only tour game played after the test series had started, the Lions attracted a rugby union record crowd of 28,648 to AAMI Park where they defeated the Melbourne Rebels 35–0.

The test series against Australia was even more successful and drew the record sporting attendance for each stadium used. The first test saw 52,499 at Suncorp Stadium, the second test drew 56,771 to Melbourne's Etihad Stadium, while 83,702 attended the third and deciding test at the ANZ Stadium in Sydney.

Attendances
Matches	10
Total attendance	418,033
Average attendance	41,803
Highest attendance	83,702; Australia vs British & Irish Lions; Stadium Australia 6 July 2013
Lowest attendance	20,071; Combined NSW–QLD Country vs British & Irish Lions; Hunter Stadium 11 June 2013

== Revenue ==
The Australian Financial Review concluded that the Lions tour generated a €19.5 million profit for Rugby Australia.

== Broadcasting ==
Fox Sports and Network Ten televised the tour in Australia, and in the UK and Ireland the games were shown by Sky Sports. Talksport provided live UK radio commentary of all matches.

Sky Sports NZL covered the tour in New Zealand and SuperSport in South Africa. In Europe, Sky Italia showed the tour in Italy, Vatican City and San Marino while Canal+ covered it in France, Andorra and Luxembourg. The tour was covered by Setanta Sports Asia across most of Asia and the Pacific Islands and J Sports showed fixtures in Japan. Gulf DTH covered the Arabic countries in Asia. ESPN Latin America showed the tour in South America and DirecTV in America (on Channel 490) and Setanta Sports Canada in Canada.

== Sponsors ==
HSBC is the main sponsor of the Lions, having also sponsored their 2009 tour to South Africa. Adidas are the playing and training supplier and have been since the 1997 tour, while Rhino supply training aids. Microsoft are the Lions' technology partners and Thomas Pink supply the official formal and evening wear for the team. Qantas are the official airline of the tour, as well as the main sponsors of the Wallabies. DHL are the sponsors of the tour itself and Gilbert provide all match balls. Specsavers are the sponsors of all match officials.
