= Combined New South Wales–Queensland Country =

Australian representative rugby union team

- Combined Country
- Full name: Combined New South Wales–Queensland Country
- Union: Australian Rugby Union
- Nickname: Combined Country
- Emblem(s): Waratah and Cooktown orchid
- Founded: 2013; 13 years ago
- Region: Country New South Wales, Country Queensland
- Coach: Cameron Blades (2013)
- Captain: Tim Davidson (2013)

Combined Country v Lions lineups

Combined Country is an Australian rugby union team that was formed for the 2013 British & Irish Lions tour to Australia. Unlike the 2001 tour, the Lions faced a combined team made up of players representing the Queensland Country and New South Wales Country rugby unions.

The match was the fourth game of the tour and was played in Newcastle on 11 June 2013 at Hunter Stadium. Referee Steve Walsh was in charge of the game.

The Combined Country team was coached by former Wallaby prop, Cameron Blades.

== Squad ==
On 10 June a 23-man squad was announced to play the British & Irish Lions. Included were nine players from Super Rugby, 10 Country players (seven QLD, three NSW) and four players from Premier rugby in New South Wales and Queensland.

Reds flanker Beau Robinson was in the initial squad but withdrew following an injury he suffered while playing for the Reds against the Lions on 8 June. He was replaced by his Reds' teammate, Jarrad Butler. The other player forced to withdraw from the squad due to injury was NSW Country flyhalf Ben Greentree. He was replaced in the starting lineup by Queensland Country player Shaun McCarthy, with fellow Queensland Country player Rory Arnold brought into the lineup on the bench to complete the squad.

Melbourne Rebels player Tim Davidson was named as captain.

Head coach: Cameron Blades

=== Forwards ===
| Player | Position | Club | Region |
|---|---|---|---|
| Tom Kearney | Hooker | Noosa Dolphins | QLD Country |
| Joshua Mann-Rea | Hooker | Brumbies | Super Rugby |
| Rikki Abraham | Prop | Teachers West | QLD Country |
| Dylan Evans | Prop | Wanderers R.U.C. | NSW Country |
| Haydn Hirsimaki | Prop | S.C. Stingrays | QLD Country |
| Tim Metcher | Prop | S. Districts | Premier Rugby |
| Phoenix Battye | Lock | Force | Super Rugby |
| Blake Enever | Lock | Reds | Super Rugby |
| Rory Arnold | Lock | G.C. Breakers | QLD Country |
| Richard Stanford | Flanker | E. Suburbs | Premier Rugby |
| Jarrad Butler | Flanker | Reds | Super Rugby |
| Trent Dyer | Flanker | Rebels | Super Rugby |
| Tim Davidson (c) | Number 8 | Rebels | Super Rugby |

=== Backs ===
| Player | Position | Club | Region |
|---|---|---|---|
| Adam McCormack | Scrum-half | Hastings Valley | NSW Country |
| Michael Snowden | Scrum-half | Force | Super Rugby |
| Angus Roberts | Fly-half | Rebels | Super Rugby |
| Shaun McCarthy | Fly-half | Burdekin R.U.C. | QLD Country |
| Lewie Catt | Centre | Wanderers R.U.C. | NSW Country |
| Tereta-Junior Siakisini | Centre | G.C. Breakers | QLD Country |
| Dale Ah-Wong | Wing | Barron-Trinity Bulls | QLD Country |
| Tom Cox | Wing | Brumbies | Super Rugby |
| Alex Gibbon | Wing | S. Districts | Premier Rugby |
| Nathan Trist | Fullback | Sydney University | Premier Rugby |

== Result ==
The Lions beat Combined Country by ten tries, seven of which converted (64 points) to nil.

== See also ==
- Australia national rugby union team
- Australian Rugby Union
- Queensland Country (NRC team)
- New South Wales Country Eagles
