= Alun Wyn Jones =

Welsh rugby union player (born 1985)

Alun Wyn Jones OBE
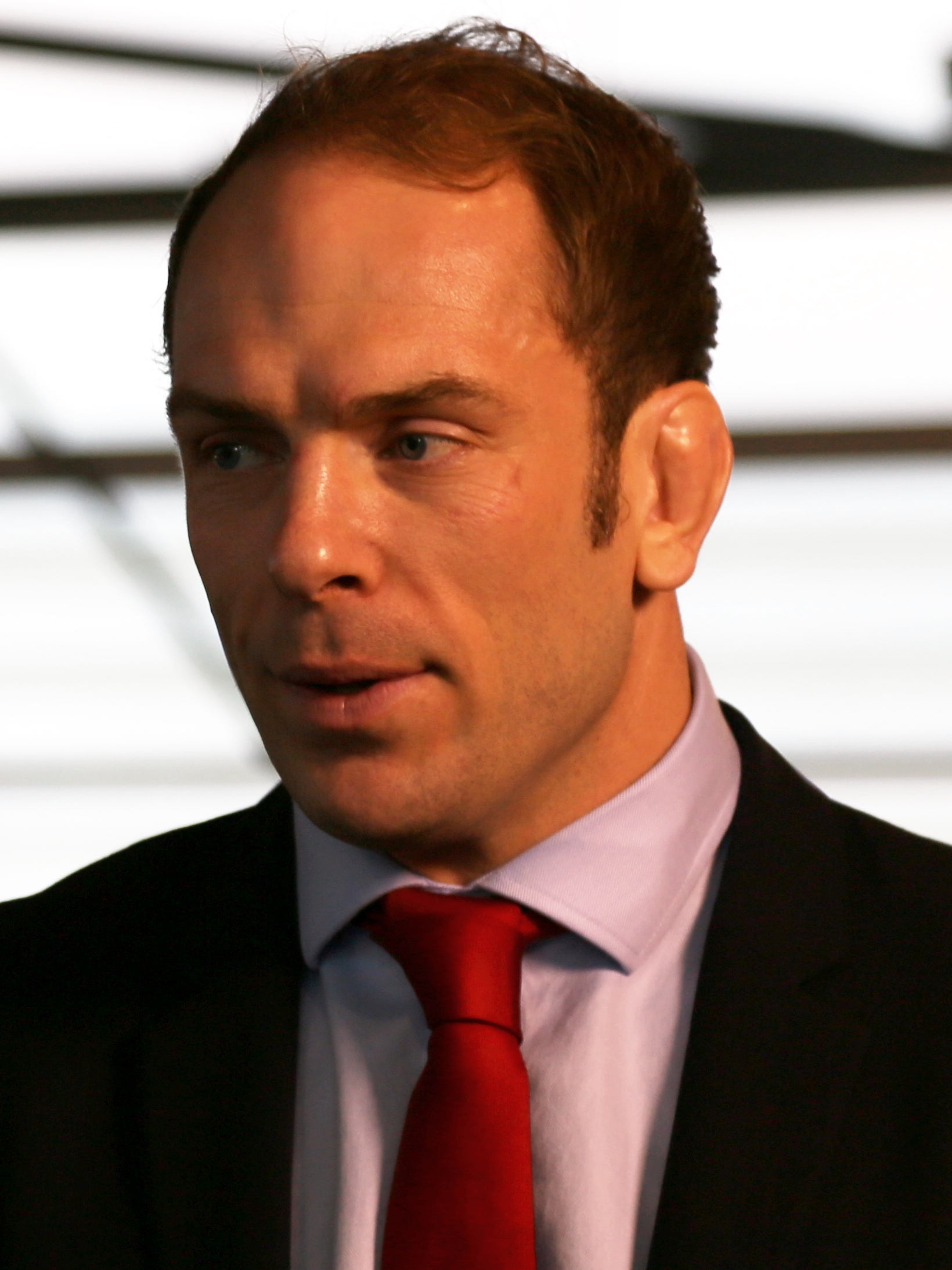
- Jones at the Welsh Rugby Grand Slam Homecoming, March 2019
- Born: 19 September 1985 (age 41) Swansea, Wales
- Height: 198 cm (6 ft 6 in)
- Weight: 121 kg (267 lb; 19 st 1 lb)
- School: Llandovery College
- University: Swansea University

Rugby union career
- Position: Lock
Senior career
Years	Team	Apps	(Points)
2004–2006	Swansea	35	(15)
2005–2023	Ospreys	257	(120)
2023	Toulon	5	(0)
International career
Years	Team	Apps	(Points)
2005–2006	Wales U21	20	(5)
2006–2023	Wales	158	(45)
2009, 2013, 2017, 2021	British & Irish Lions	12	(0)

Alun Wyn Jones OBE (born 19 September 1985) is a Welsh former rugby union player who played as a lock. He played most of his career for the Ospreys and for the Wales national team. He is the world's most-capped rugby union player, with 158 caps for Wales and 12 for the British & Irish Lions, and also holds the records for the most Wales caps and the second-most Wales caps as captain. He retired from rugby in 2023.

Jones was the captain of the British & Irish Lions for their 2021 tour to South Africa, and is one of only five players to have been selected to play on four or more Lions tours, (Note: The others are Willie John McBride and Mike Gibson (5 tours each), and Brian O'Driscoll and Owen Farrell (4 tours each).) in 2009, 2013, 2017 and 2021. He is one of seven Wales players to have won three Grand Slams. (Note: The others are Gerald Davies, Gareth Edwards, J. P. R. Williams, Ryan Jones, Adam Jones and Gethin Jenkins.) He was named the best player of the 2019 Six Nations Championship and was nominated for World Player of the Year in 2015 and 2019.

== Early life ==
Jones was born in Swansea to Tim Jones, a solicitor, and Ann Jones, a secondary school teacher. Both Jones' father and grandfather had previously played rugby for Swansea. Jones grew up in Mumbles, initially playing football before switching to rugby whilst at Oystermouth Primary School. For his secondary education, he attended Bishop Gore School and joined Bonymaen RFC at age 11. At 16, Jones joined Llandovery College on a partial scholarship.

== Club career ==
=== Swansea and Ospreys ===
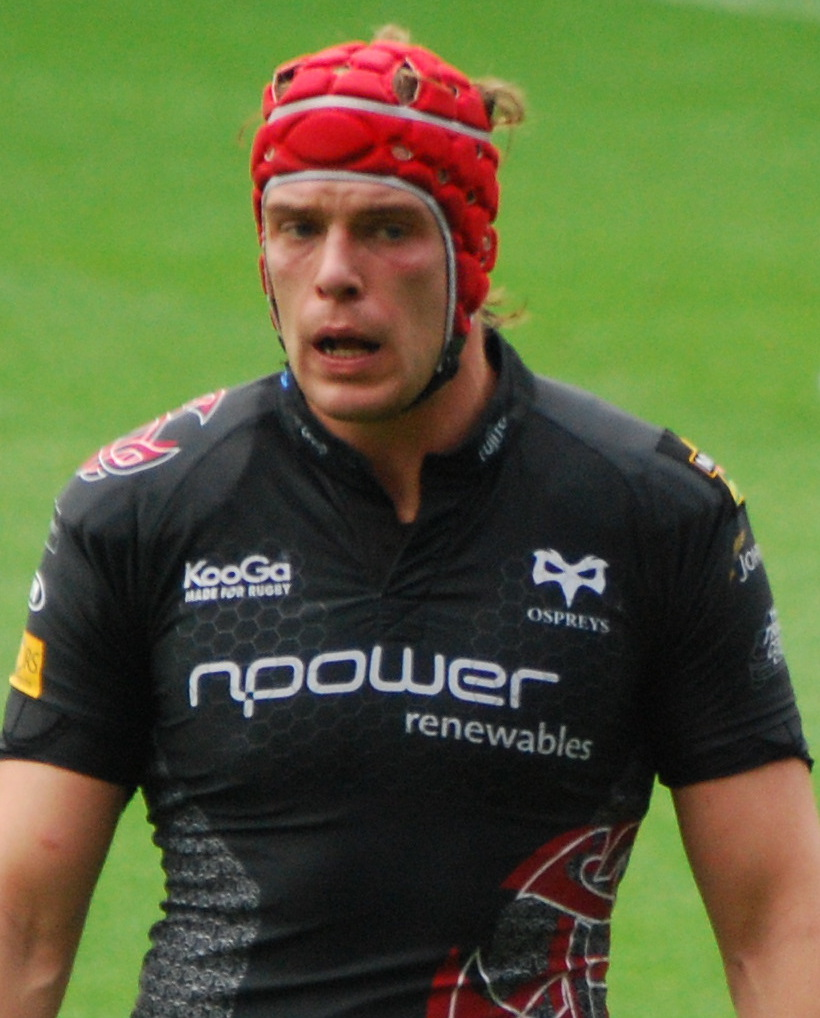
Jones during a match against Harlequins, October 2008

Jones played for Swansea RFC while in the Ospreys Academy. Jones made his Ospreys debut on 4 September 2005 in a 22–20 win over Leinster and having made several appearances as a replacement, Jones made his first Ospreys start against Border Reivers later that month.

After a disappointing first season in which Ospreys finished 6th in the 2005–06 Celtic League, Jones went on to win the 2006–07 Celtic League title, the first trophy of his career.

Jones played in the 2008 Anglo-Welsh Cup final against Leicester, scoring the second try as Ospreys ran out 6–23 winners.

On 23 August 2010, the Ospreys announced that Jones would succeed Welsh teammate Ryan Jones as club captain for the 2010–11 season. The decision was made, in part, so Ryan Jones could concentrate on the national captaincy during a busy World Cup year.

On 9 December 2016, Jones broke the Ospreys' record for the highest try scoring forward as he touched down for his 21st try.

=== Toulon ===
On 7 July 2023, Jones would sign for French team Toulon as a cover during the 2023 Rugby World Cup held in France. On 18 November, he would be made captain for the last match of his career in a Top14 match against Clermont. He received a standing ovation from the crowd.

=== Barbarians ===
On 28 May 2023, Jones captained the Barbarians to a 48-42 victory over a World XV. Three days later, Jones played for both the Barbarians and Swansea RFC, swapping teams at half-time, in a game at the St Helen's ground, celebrating Swansea's 150th anniversary.

On 4 November 2023, Jones played for the Barbarians against Wales at the Principality Stadium. Jones captained the Barbarians, scored a try, and was named man of the match, despite losing 49-26.

== International career ==
=== Wales ===
Jones represented Wales at both under-18 and under-21 level, completing a Grand Slam at the 2005 under-21 Six Nations Championship.

Jones made his senior Wales debut during the 2006 Summer Tests, starting at flanker as Wales lost to Argentina in successive games. Jones would secure his first Wales win against the Pacific Islanders at the Millennium Stadium in the 2006 Autumn Internationals. Jones' first appearance at lock would occur in the following game, a victory over Canada, ahead of a permanent switch from then on.

Jones became first choice lock ahead of the 2007 Six Nations, appearing in all 5 games. Disappointing performances however saw Wales finish 5th in the standings, securing their only win of the tournament on the final day against England. Jones scored his first Wales try during the 2007 Rugby World Cup warm-up matches, crossing the line in a 27–20 win over Argentina. Jones was selected at lock in Wales opening 2007 Rugby World Cup pool game against Canada, scoring on his World Cup debut as Wales ran out unconvincing 42–17 victors. Following defeat to Australia in Cardiff, Jones would score again against Japan at the Millennium Stadium in the third pool game, increasing their chances to qualify. Unfortunately, Wales would fall to defeat in the final game against Fiji, crashing out of the World Cup at the pool stage.

Jones started in Wales' opening game of the 2008 Six Nations against England, achieving a first win at Twickenham in 20 years. Jones would miss the following two games, victories over Scotland and Italy due to injury before returning for the final games against Ireland and France. Wales would complete their second Grand Slam in four years, and a first for Jones. Jones scored his first Six Nations try in the opening game of the 2009 championship against Scotland at Murrayfield. In the penultimate game of the tournament against Italy, Jones was selected to captain Wales for the first time, becoming the 126th player to do so.

On 18 January 2010, he was named in the 35-man Wales squad for the 2010 Six Nations tournament. In the first game against England, Jones tripped hooker Dylan Hartley, for which he was sent to the sin-bin. During his 10 minutes there, England scored 17 points and went on to victory. Coach Warren Gatland later criticised Jones for the offence, saying it cost Wales the game.

2014 saw Jones captain Wales three times – once against Italy and twice against South Africa. In the 2014 Autumn Internationals, he scored a try in Wales's 28–33 loss to Australia.

In the 2015 Six Nations, he formed a second row partnership with Luke Charteris and won two man-of-the-match awards during the tournament, earning them against Scotland and Italy.

Jones made his 100th appearance when Wales faced South Africa in the quarter-finals of the 2015 Rugby World Cup but Wales were knocked out of the competition with South Africa winning 23–19.

Jones took part in the 2016 Six Nations and was originally paired with Luke Charteris who was then replaced by Bradley Davies. Jones suffered an injury in the penultimate game against England in the tournament and was replaced with a returning Charteris. Jones returned to action on the 2016 tour to New Zealand, playing his 100th test for Wales in the first test against New Zealand – his 106th appearance. His 100th Welsh test ended in disappointment with New Zealand beating Wales 39–21, going on to win the series 3–0.

He took part in the 2016 autumn internationals but had to miss the first match due to the death of his father. He returned to play Argentina in which he won the man of the match award. Jones took over from Sam Warburton as captain of the Welsh squad for the 2017 Six Nations.

In 2019, Jones captained Wales in their Grand Slam victory and was named Player of the Championship in a public vote. It was later established that Jones suffered knee ligament damage early in the Grand Slam decider against Ireland. Following the game, he was referred to by Jonathan Davies and others as "the greatest ever" Welsh rugby player.

On 29 September 2019, in a game against Australia at the 2019 Rugby World Cup, he became Wales' most-capped player, overtaking the record of 129 caps held by Gethin Jenkins.

On 24 October 2020, Jones equalled Richie McCaw's record for the most international appearances, 148 caps, during Wales' 38–21 loss to France. A week later he set a new record, winning his 149th cap against Scotland. On 19 March 2022 he lost his 150th cap, at home against Italy.

On 19 May 2023, Jones announced his immediate retirement from international rugby along with fellow Welsh international Justin Tipuric.

=== British and Irish Lions ===
In 2009, Jones was one of 13 Welsh players selected in the squad for the British & Irish Lions' tour to South Africa. Jones appeared in the provincial matches against Royal XV, when he scored his first Lions try, Golden Lions, and Sharks. Jones then started the first test alongside Paul O'Connell against South Africa, with the team losing 26–21 in Durban. Jones appeared as a replacement in the remaining two tests, a defeat and a win, as the series ended in a 2–1 defeat for the Lions. In total he played 24 games across 4 tours (including 12 tests) scoring 2 tries.

Jones received his second Lions selection on 30 April 2013, for the tour to Australia. Jones played and scored in a warm up game against the Barbarians before appearing in provincial games against Western Force, Combined Country and Waratahs. Jones started at Lock in the first test, playing a role in a 23–21 win, as well as in the second test defeat in Melbourne. Due to Sam Warburton's tour-ending injury in the second test, Jones was selected as captain for the deciding third test in Sydney, which the Lions won 41–16. This made him the first substitute captain to lead the Lions to victory in the final test of a series since 1904.

On 19 April 2017, Jones was again selected for the Lions ahead of their tour to New Zealand. Jones captained the Lions for the second time in the provincial game against the Crusaders as the Lions won 3–12. Jones was once again first choice Lock for the tour, starting at 4 in the first test and 5 in the second and third and left New Zealand as the first player in the professional era to play in nine consecutive British & Irish Lions tests. During the Lions tour he became one of only seven Lions players to have beaten South Africa, Australia and New Zealand while touring these countries, following the 24–21 win in the second test. Jones started in all three tests of the series against the All Blacks.

On 6 May 2021, Jones was selected and named captain of the British and Irish Lions for their tour to South Africa. He dislocated his shoulder in the warm-up match against Japan in Edinburgh on 26 June but returned to play in the successful first test win against the Springboks four weeks later. Jones played in all three tests to reach 12 British and Irish Lions caps. South Africa won the final test 19–16 and the series by two games to one.

=== International tries ===
Try	Opponent	Location	Venue	Tests	Date	Result
1	Argentina	Cardiff, Wales	Millennium Stadium	2007 Rugby World Cup warm-up matches	18 August 2007	Win
2	Canada	Nantes, France	Stade de la Beaujoire	2007 Rugby World Cup	9 September 2007	Win
3	Japan	Cardiff, Wales	Millennium Stadium	2007 Rugby World Cup	20 September 2007	Win
4	Scotland	Edinburgh, Scotland	Murrayfield	2009 Six Nations	8 February 2009	Win
5	South Africa	Cardiff, Wales	Millennium Stadium	2010 Summer Internationals	5 June 2010	Loss
6	Argentina	Cardiff, Wales	Millennium Stadium	2011 Rugby World Cup warm-up matches	20 August 2011	Win
7	Namibia	New Plymouth, New Zealand	Yarrow Stadium	2011 Rugby World Cup	26 September 2011	Win
8	Australia	Cardiff, Wales	Millennium Stadium	2014 Autumn Internationals	8 November 2014	Loss
9	New Zealand	Wellington, New Zealand	Westpac Stadium	2016 Tour of New Zealand	18 June 2016	Loss

== Personal life ==
Jones and his wife, Dr. Anwen Jones, have three daughters.

Jones studied part-time for a degree in law at Swansea University, graduating on 21 July 2010.

Jones was appointed Officer of the Order of the British Empire (OBE) in the 2020 Birthday Honours for services to rugby union in Wales. He was invested, by Prince William, in a ceremony at Windsor Castle, on 9 November 2021.

== Honours ==
=== Ospreys ===
- Celtic League/Pro12: 2006–07, 2009–10, 2011–12
- Anglo-Welsh Cup: 2007–08
- Welsh Shield: 2021-22

=== Wales U21 ===
- Six Nations Under 20s Championship: 2005

=== Wales ===
- Six Nations Championship: 2008, 2012, 2013, 2019, 2021
- Grand Slam: 2008, 2012, 2019
- Triple Crown: 2008, 2012, 2019, 2021
- Doddie Weir Cup: 2018, 2019, 2021
- Prince William Cup: 2014, 2016, 2017, 2018

=== British & Irish Lions ===
- British & Irish Lions series: 2013
- 2017 British & Irish Lions tour to New Zealand (drawn series)

=== Individual ===
- Officer of the Order of the British Empire: 2020 Queen's Birthday Honours
- British & Irish Lions captain: 2021
- British & Irish Lions tourist: 2009, 2013, 2017, 2021
- IRB International Player of the Year Shortlist: 2015, 2019
- Rugby World Magazine Player of the Year: 2019
- Six Nations Player of the Championship: 2019
- BBC Cymru Wales Sports Personality of the Year: 2019
- Honorary colonel of the 3rd Battalion of the Royal Welsh, a British Army infantry reserve battalion 15 July 2025

== Biography ==
Belonging: The Autobiography, 2021, Pan Macmillan ISBN 978-1529058093

Sporting positions
Preceded by Sam Warburton	Wales captain 2017–2023	Succeeded by Ken Owens
Preceded by Sam Warburton	British & Irish Lions captain 2021	Succeeded by Conor Murray
