= Rory Arnold =

Australia international rugby union player

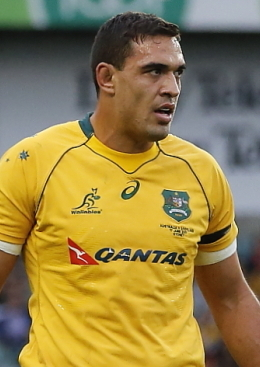
- Full name: Rory Wiremu Arnold
- Born: 1 July 1990 (age 36) Wagga Wagga, New South Wales, Australia
- Height: 2.08 m (6 ft 10 in)
- Weight: 120 kg (18 st 13 lb; 265 lb)
- School: Murwillumbah High School

Rugby union career
- Position: Lock
Youth career
- 2010–2012: Murwillumbah
Amateur team(s)
Years	Team	Apps	(Points)
2013	Gold Coast Breakers		
Senior career
Years	Team	Apps	(Points)
2013	Griquas	6	(10)
2014−2019	Canberra Vikings	21	(28)
2019–2022	Stade Toulousain	55	(30)
2022-2025	Hino Red Dolphins	21	(25)
2025–	NEC Green Rockets	10	(5)
- Correct as of 7 December 2022
Super Rugby
Years	Team	Apps	(Points)
2015–2019	Brumbies	73	(45)
- Correct as of 28 June 2019
International career
Years	Team	Apps	(Points)
2013	Combined Country	1	(0)
2016−	Australia	32	(5)
- Correct as of 4 September 2022

Rory Arnold (born 1 July 1990) is an Australian professional rugby union player. He played for the Stade Toulousain in the Top 14 competition, and has represented Australia in test matches. His regular position is lock.

== Family and early life ==
Rory Arnold and his identical twin Richie were born in Wagga Wagga, Australia. Their father Tony was stationed there while in the army. The brothers were raised in Murwillumbah in northern New South Wales, where they both played junior rugby league until aged 16. In 2010, Rory joined the Murwillumbah rugby club where he played for two seasons before being scouted by the Gold Coast Breakers. (now Bond University Rugby Club). The brothers have Māori heritage on their mother's side

== Rugby career ==
Arnold played Premier Rugby for the Breakers in 2013 and was selected in the Combined New South Wales–Queensland Country side that faced the British & Irish Lions during their 2013 tour to Australia, coming on as a late substitute.

He joined South African side Griquas for the 2013 Currie Cup Premier Division competition. Arnold scored a try in his opening match and was accused of biting a defender when scoring it. He was initially suspended but the charge was overturned and annulled on appeal.

Arnold underwent a shoulder reconstruction and sat out most of the 2014 season before joining the University of Canberra Vikings in the inaugural National Rugby Championship. He was included in the Brumbies squad for the 2015 Super Rugby season. He made his debut in the Brumbies season-opening match against the Reds, starting in their 47–3 victory in Canberra. As of 2015, Arnold was among the tallest players in Super Rugby, behind South African lock JP du Preez at 1 cm taller.

He leaves the Stade Toulousain in 2022 to continue his career in Japan.

=== Wallabies ===
In 2016, Arnold was named in the Wallabies preliminary 39-man squad for the 2016 series against England. He played two tests in the series.

== Super Rugby statistics ==
As of 25 February 2019

Season	Team	Apps	Start	Sub	Mins	T	C	PG	DG	Pts	YC	RC
2015	Brumbies	15	14	1	843	1	0	0	0	5	0	0
2016	Brumbies	14	13	1	706	1	0	0	0	5	0	0
2017	Brumbies	15	14	1	802	1	0	0	0	5	0	0
2018	Brumbies	13	12	1	889	2	0	0	0	10	1	1
2019	Brumbies	2	2	0	127	0	0	0	0	0	0	0
Total		59	55	4	3365	6	0	0	0	30	1	1
