= Tom Youngs =

British Lions & England international rugby union player

- Born: Thomas Nicholas Youngs; 28 January 1987 (age 39) Norwich, England
- Height: 1.75 m (5 ft 9 in)
- Weight: 104 kg (16 st 5 lb)
- School: Gresham's
- Notable relative(s): Nick Youngs (father); Ben Youngs (brother)

Rugby union career
- Position(s): Hooker; Centre
Senior career
Years	Team	Apps	(Points)
2006–2021	Leicester Tigers	215	(115)
2006–2008	Bedford (loan)	24	(25)
2009–2011	Nottingham (loan)	55	(75)
2006–2021	Total	294	(215)
- Correct as of 20 June 2021
International career
Years	Team	Apps	(Points)
2012–2015	England	28	(0)
2013	British & Irish Lions	3	(0)
- Correct as of 10 October 2015
National sevens team
Years	Team		Comps
2007–2008	England Sevens		

Thomas Nicholas Youngs (born 28 January 1987) is a retired rugby union player who played as a hooker for Leicester Tigers and England. Between 2012–2015 he won 28 caps for England, including selection for the 2015 Rugby World Cup and was selected for the 2013 British & Irish Lions tour to Australia where he played in all three test matches. He played 215 times for Leicester between 2006 and 2021, winning the Premiership Rugby title in 2013, the same season that he was named as the league's Player of the season. He also won the 2011-12 Anglo-Welsh Cup with Leicester. Between 2009 and 2011 Youngs played 55 matches for Nottingham where he converted from centre to hooker.

== Background ==
Youngs is the son of former Leicester and England scrum-half Nick Youngs, and the elder brother of former Leicester and England scrum-half Ben Youngs.

Originally a centre, Youngs changed to play at hooker after advice from then Tigers' coach Heyneke Meyer.

Youngs played for Gresham's School and for England Schools, and also for Holt as a junior.

Youngs is now a farmer.

== Club career ==
Youngs made his Tigers debut against London Irish on Boxing Day 2006, broke his leg after five minutes and came off after thirteen.

In the 2008/09 season, when he was persuaded to switch to hooker he was used by new head Coach Richard Cockerill in the Leicester "A" team as a hooker.

In the 2010–2011 season he was loaned to the Leicester feeder club Nottingham R.F.C. where he was first choice hooker.

Youngs started the 2013 Premiership final, alongside his brother Ben, as Leicester defeated Northampton Saints.

At the start of the 2016–17 season he was announced as club captain for the Tigers, replacing lock Ed Slater after being injured for nearly half of the previous season.

After taking indefinite leave during the 2021/22 season to care for his wife during illness, Youngs announced his retirement on 27 April 2022.

== International career ==
In 2007–08, Youngs was a member of the England squad at Rugby sevens.

On England's summer tour to South Africa in 2012, Youngs was taken as part of the main touring squad for experience. He played in the midweek games and his performances led to him being touted as a future England starting hooker.

Due to an injury to England's first-choice hooker Dylan Hartley and the earlier retirement of second-choice Lee Mears, Youngs was awarded the number 2 shirt for England's first 2012 Autumn International match against Fiji, and was joined on the pitch by substitute brother Ben. The Youngs brothers became the second family to have a father and two sons play for England after Sir William Milton and his sons Jumbo and Cecil. An impressive performance meant that he retained the shirt for the second test.

Youngs was named as part of the victorious Lions squad for the 2013 British & Irish Lions tour to Australia.

Youngs was named in Stuart Lancaster's 31- man squad for the 2015 Rugby World Cup and went on to start all 4 games as hooker. He was controversially overlooked for the Six Nations by new coach Eddie Jones and then was injured for the Summer tour of Australia. He was overlooked again for the 2016 Autumn Internationals and was not chosen for Jones' 45 EPS Squad for the Six Nations with skipper Dylan Hartley as first-choice, Jamie George as second choice and Tommy Taylor as third choice.
