= Nick Youngs =

England international rugby union player

- Born: Nicholas Gerald Youngs; 15 December 1959 (age 66)
- School: Cawston College; Gresham's School
- Notable relative(s): Tom Youngs; Ben Youngs
- Occupation: Farmer

Rugby union career
- Position: Scrum-half
Amateur team(s)
Years	Team	Apps	(Points)
- Bedford Blues
1981–1988	Leicester Tigers		
International career
Years	Team	Apps	(Points)
1983–84	England	6	

Nicholas Gerald Youngs (born 15 December 1959) is an English former rugby union footballer who played for Bedford, Leicester Tigers and England, at Scrum-half, gaining six England caps in 1983–1984. He also was an unused England reserve five times between 1981 and 1983.

He was educated at Cawston College and Gresham's School, Holt, and is now a farmer in Norfolk.

His sons Tom, a centre turned hooker, (born 1987) and Ben (born 1989), a scrum-half, have both made appearances for the Leicester first team and for England. Tom made his Tigers debut against London Irish on Boxing Day 2006, but broke his leg after five minutes and came off after thirteen.

Youngs and his sons hold the rare distinction of all starting in test wins over New Zealand – Youngs starting at scrum-half in England's 15–9 1983 win, and Ben (scrum-half) and Tom (hooker) in England's 38–21 victory in 2012.
