= Sam Warburton =

Welsh rugby union player

Sam Warburton OBE MStJ
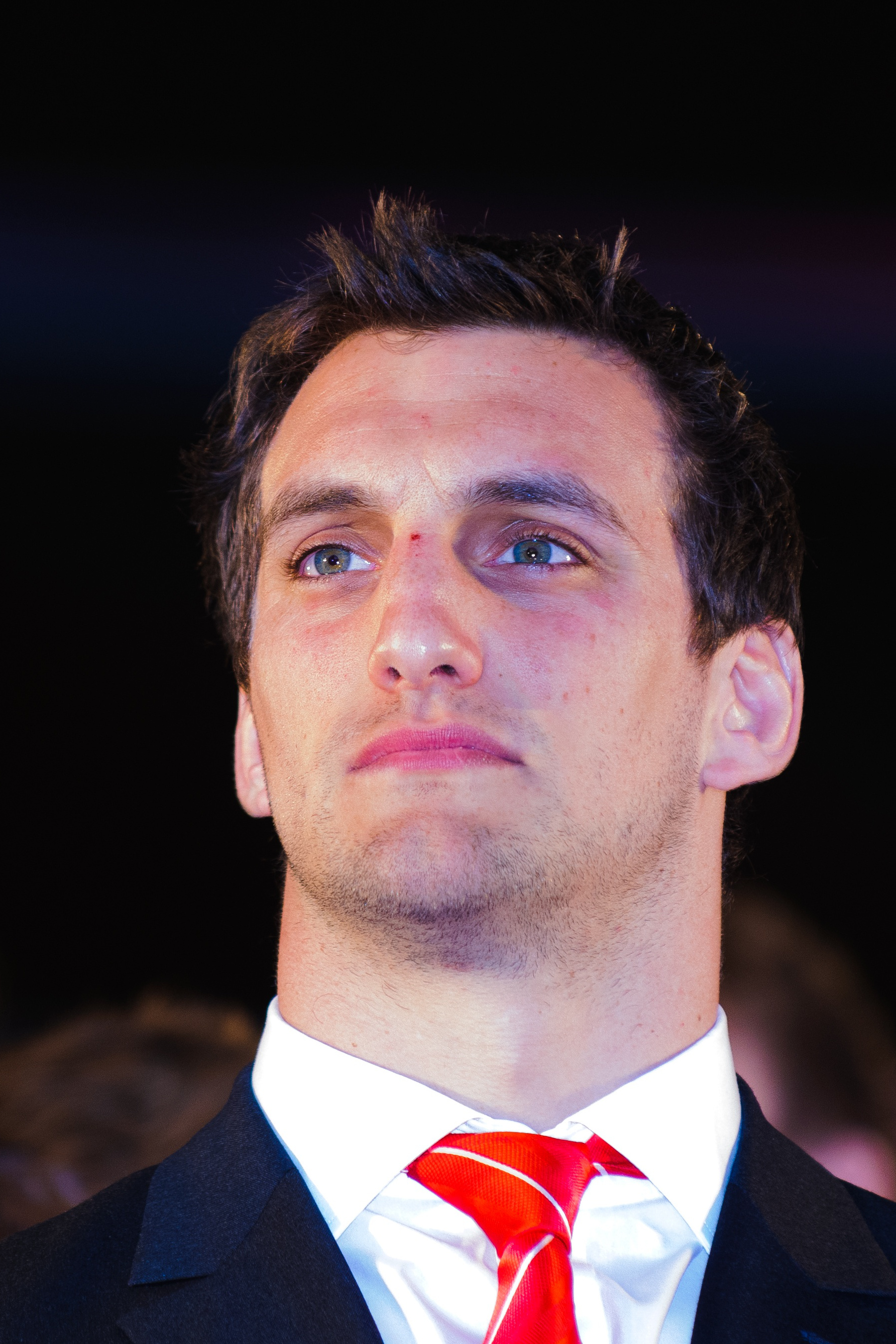
- Warburton at the 2012 Grand Slam celebrations
- Born: Sam Kennedy Warburton; 5 October 1988 (age 38) Cardiff, Wales
- Height: 6 ft 3 in (190cm)
- Weight: 16 st 3 lb (103 kg)
- School: Whitchurch High School

Rugby union career
- Position: Flanker
Senior career
Years	Team	Apps	(Points)
2006–2009	Glamorgan Wanderers	27	(10)
- Correct as of 12 September 2009
Provincial / State sides
Years	Team	Apps	(Points)
2009–2017	Cardiff Rugby	106	(90)
- Correct as of 7 April 2017
International career
Years	Team	Apps	(Points)
- Wales U18
2007	Wales U19	5	(0)
2008	Wales U20	4	(5)
2009–2017	Wales	74	(25)
2013, 2017	British & Irish Lions	5	(0)
- Correct as of 10 July 2017

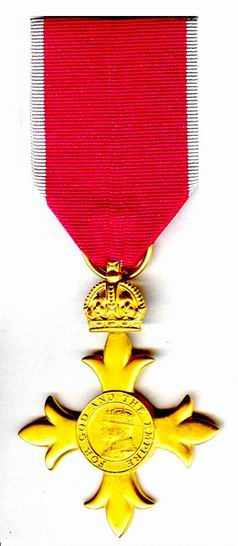
OBE insignia

Sam Kennedy Warburton OBE MStJ (born 5 October 1988) is a Welsh former international rugby union player. Warburton played rugby for Cardiff Rugby and was first capped for Wales in 2009. He usually played as an openside flanker but was also capable of playing at blindside.

In June 2011, Warburton captained Wales versus the Barbarians and, in August 2011, was named Wales captain for the 2011 Rugby World Cup. In April 2013, he was chosen to be the Lions' captain for the 2013 tour to Australia and became captain for the 2017 Lions tour to New Zealand. Warburton holds the record for the most Wales caps as captain (49).

In July 2018, Warburton announced his retirement from rugby union at 29 years of age after failing to recover fully from neck and back surgery.

Warburton founded the online fitness app SW7 Academy in 2019.

== Early and personal life ==
Warburton was born in Wales to English parents and he considers himself Welsh and British. He has an elder twin brother, Ben, who played at semi-professional level with Glamorgan Wanderers RFC and is now a physiotherapist for the Scarlets, and an older sister Holly, a schoolteacher. Their great-grandfather, George Reed, was a professional footballer who played 150 times for Leeds United in the 1920s and 1930s. He attended Whitchurch High School and left with three A Levels.

As a youngster Warburton was a keen football player and played for his school team alongside schoolmate Real Madrid and Wales forward Gareth Bale. He had a trial with local club Cardiff City at the age of 14 but chose to concentrate on rugby instead. He played on the junior teams of Rhiwbina RFC and played for Glamorgan Wanderers RFC whilst a member of the Cardiff Rugby Academy.

On 5 July 2014, Warburton married long term partner Rachel Thomas in a church ceremony in Newport, before the couple held a reception at the Celtic Manor Resort. He is a supporter of Tottenham Hotspur FC.

== Career ==
Warburton represented Wales at all levels, captaining the under-18s, under-19s and under-20s. He led Wales to the semi-finals of the World Championships at under-19 and under-20 level. Warburton made his debut for the senior Wales national team against the United States on 6 June 2009.

On 18 January 2010, Warburton was named in the 35-man Wales squad for the 2010 Six Nations. He scored his first international try against Italy in the 2011 Six Nations. Warburton captained Wales for the first time against the Barbarians on 4 June 2011 at the age of 22 years and 242 days becoming Wales' second-youngest captain after Gareth Edwards. In a World Cup warm-up match against England, Warburton was named man of the match. In August 2011, he was named as captain for the 2011 Rugby World Cup in New Zealand in the absence of the injured Matthew Rees.

=== 2011 Rugby World Cup ===
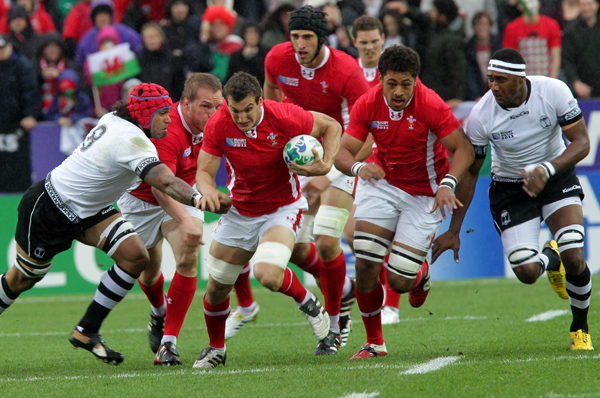
Warburton carrying the ball against Fiji in the Pool D match at the 2011 Rugby World Cup

In the opening match of the tournament against South Africa, Warburton became the youngest World Cup captain. He was tasked with facing the South African openside flanker, Heinrich Brüssow (Brüssow was coming off/dealing with a string of injuries). While Wales lost 17–16, Warburton won man of the match, forcing five turnovers. Despite Warburton's efforts, Brüssow's counter-rucking allowed the Springboks to win possession from the Welsh in the final seconds of the game, allowing Fourie du Preez to kick the ball out for the victory. Warburton continued his form in the match against Samoa, making numerous turnovers and 17 tackles as Wales won 17–10. Warburton played another good game against Namibia before being rested for the final half-hour in the 81–7 game. Wales then booked their place in the quarter-finals against Ireland with a 66–0 win over Fiji, in direct contrast to the loss of four years earlier. Warburton was again at the heart of the performance making some steals and some good runs, and also scoring his second test try. At the end of this remarkable few weeks, Warburton was then voted the Player of Pool D by the fans; he had taken the tournament by storm, making the highest number of turnovers.

Wales then met Ireland in the quarter-final as Warburton faced the in-form Irish openside flanker Seán O'Brien, in the 'battle of the opensides'. Wales reached the semi-final for the first time in 24 years with a 22–10 win, as Warburton continued his form, making 21 tackles and a number of turnovers, disrupting Ireland's ball. In the semi-final against an out-of-form France, Warburton became the second Wales player to receive a red card in a World Cup when he was sent off after 18 minutes by the Irish referee Alain Rolland for a dangerous tackle on Vincent Clerc. Warburton admitted the offence at a disciplinary hearing in Auckland, and stated to the press that the decision was fair. However, he stated in his autobiography in 2019 that he actually considered that only a yellow card should have been awarded. Despite the sending off, the Guardian newspaper, Brynmor Williams and Sir Ian McGeechan, the Lions coach, named him player of the tournament.

=== 2012 Six Nations ===
In spite of the return of former captain Matthew Rees, Warburton retained the Wales captaincy for the 2012 Six Nations. However, the campaign was disrupted by injury. In the opening match against Ireland, Warburton went off injured at half-time with a dead leg, but Wales managed to win 23–21. He missed the 27–13 win over Scotland but returned for the Triple Crown decider against England. Wales won 19–12. Warburton was at his best making steals, carries, taking lineouts, but it was his try-saving tackle on Manu Tuilagi that caught the eye. The England centre seemed destined to score in the corner but Warburton launched himself low and grabbed his ankles to make a superb try-saver. Clive Woodward considered his performance "the most outstanding performance I have ever seen from a Lion". As a result, he was awarded man of the match. However, he sustained a knee injury and missed the 24–3 win over Italy. He returned for the Grand Slam decider against France but was once again injured, this time his shoulder and was taken off at half-time. Wales prevailed though 16–9 to claim a Grand Slam. Warburton would then lift the trophy with one hand, since his other shoulder was in a sling. He later spoke of his guilt at going off at half-time and asked vice-captains Gethin Jenkins and Ryan Jones to share the raising of the trophy, but the veterans said it was his moment. The injury he sustained would rule him out for six weeks, returning in time for the Lions tour of Australia in June 2013.

=== 2015 Six Nations ===
Warburton surpassed the record of 33 caps as Wales captain held by Ryan Jones against Ireland on 14 March 2015.

=== British & Irish Lions ===
Warburton was named as captain of a 37-man squad for the 2013 British & Irish Lions tour to Australia, making him the youngest ever Lions captain at the age of 24. Warburton was selected as captain in the first test in Brisbane, combining in the back row with Tom Croft and Jamie Heaslip. The Lions won 23–21 with Warburton topping the tackle count with 14. Warburton started the second test a week later. The Lions lost 16–15 and many considered the turning point to be when Warburton got injured and left the field. Warburton was magnificent at the breakdown preventing the Wallabies from having a platform. However, the hamstring injury he picked up in the second test meant Warburton was ruled out of the final, deciding test, with Alun Wyn Jones captaining the team to a 41–16 win and the Lions’ first series victory since 1997. After the match, Warburton and Jones raised the Tom Richards Cup together.

In April 2017, Warburton was selected by Warren Gatland to captain the Lions for the 2017 tour to New Zealand.

==== International tries ====
Try	Opponent	Location	Venue	Competition	Date	Result
1	Italy	Rome, Italy	Stadio Olimpico	2011 Six Nations	26 February 2011	Win
2	Fiji	Hamilton, New Zealand	Waikato Stadium	2011 Rugby World Cup	2 October 2011	Win
3	France	Cardiff, Wales	Millennium Stadium	2014 Six Nations	21 February 2014	Win
4	Italy	Rome, Italy	Stadio Olimpico	2015 Six Nations	21 March 2015	Win
5	Japan	Cardiff, Wales	Millennium Stadium	2016 Autumn Internationals	19 November 2016	Win

== Honours ==
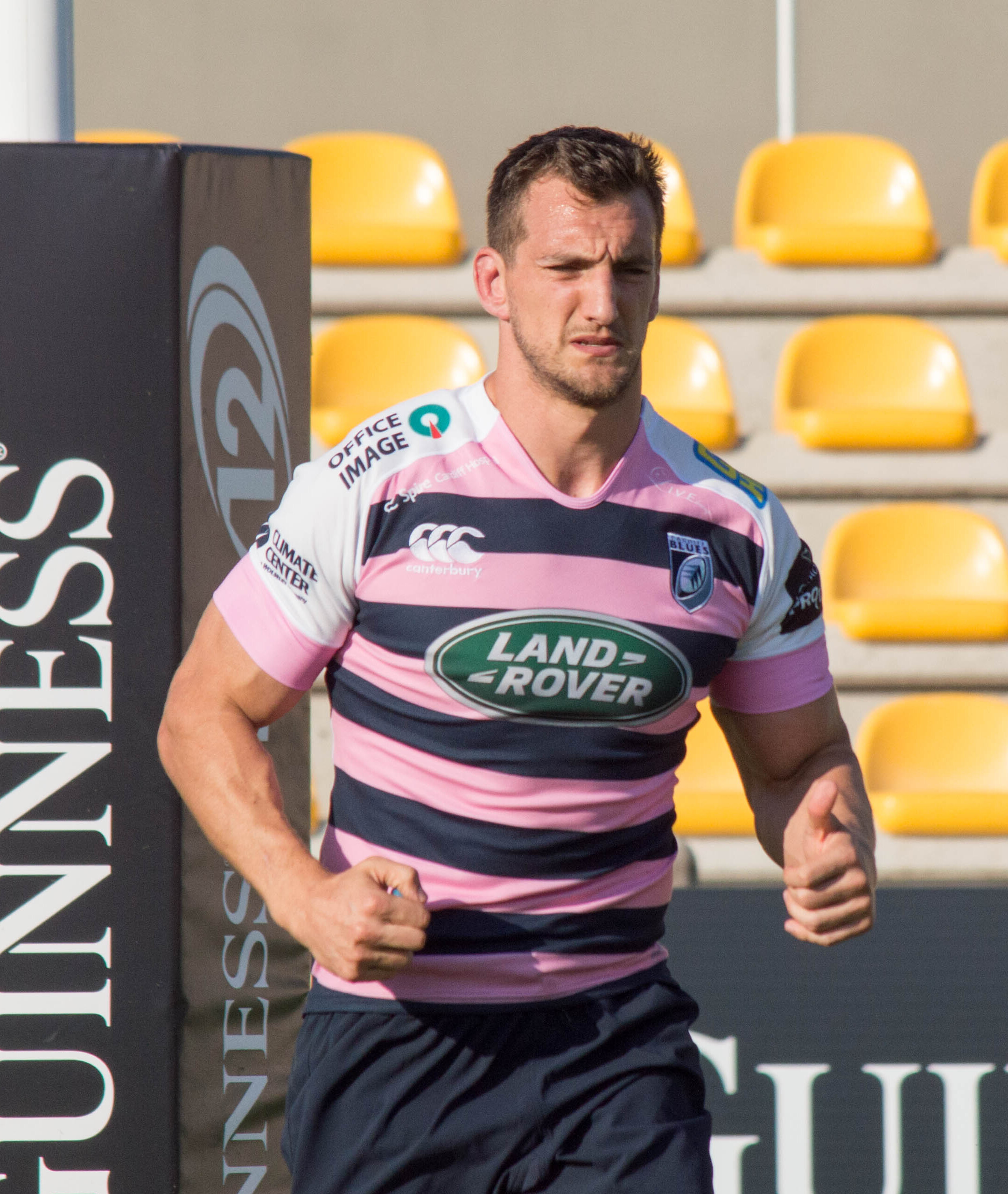
Warburton playing for Cardiff Rugby

- : Officer of the Order of the British Empire (2018)
- : Member of the Order of St John (2018)

=== Cardiff Rugby ===
- European Challenge Cup: 2009–10

=== Wales ===
- Six Nations Championship:
  - Winner (2): 2012, 2013
  - Grand Slam Winner (1):2012
  - Triple Crown Winner (1):2012

Warburton was awarded Honorary Fellowship by the University of South Wales in 2013.

Sporting positions
Preceded by Matthew Rees	Wales captain 2011–2017	Succeeded by Alun Wyn Jones
Preceded by Paul O'Connell	British & Irish Lions captain 2013, 2017	Succeeded by Alun Wyn Jones
