= Ben Youngs =

English rugby union player

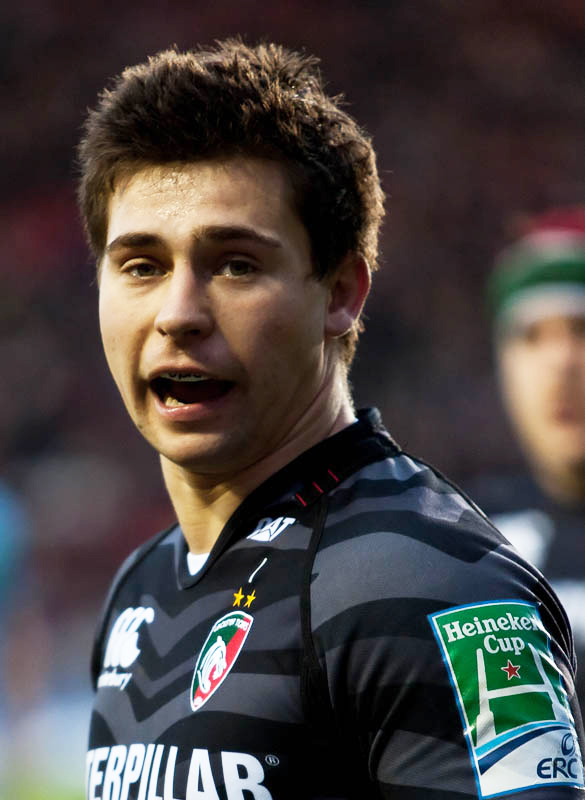
- Youngs representing Leicester Tigers during the Heineken Cup
- Full name: Benjamin Ryder Youngs
- Born: 5 September 1989 (age 37) Aylsham, England
- Height: 1.78 m (5 ft 10 in)
- Weight: 120 kg (265 lb; 18 st 13 lb)
- School: Gresham's School; Wyggeston and Queen Elizabeth I College
- Notable relative(s): Nick Youngs (father); Tom Youngs (brother)

Rugby union career
- Position: Scrum-half
- Current team: Leicester Tigers
Senior career
Years	Team	Apps	(Points)
2007–2025	Leicester Tigers	338	(235)
- Correct as of 15 June 2025
International career
Years	Team	Apps	(Points)
2008–2009	England U20	15	(20)
2010	England Saxons	1	(0)
2010–2023	England	127	(100)
2013	British & Irish Lions	2	(0)
- Correct as of 29 October 2023

Benjamin Ryder Youngs (born 5 September 1989) is an English former professional rugby union player who played as a scrum-half for Premiership Rugby club Leicester Tigers, and is the all time appearance record holder with 127 caps for the men’s England national team.

He made his club debut at 17 in 2007 and in 2010 made his debut for England; in 2022 he became England men’s most capped player with 115 appearances subsequently earning 127 in total. He started the 2019 Rugby World Cup Final and toured Australia with the Lions in 2013. Youngs has been a Premiership Rugby champion five times, winning in 2007, 2009, 2010, 2013, and in 2022.

== Early and personal life ==
Youngs was born 5 September 1989 in Aylsham, Norfolk, England. His older brother Tom Youngs is also a rugby player, for Leicester Tigers as a hooker. His father Nick Youngs played scrum-half for both Leicester and England.

Youngs is married to Charlotte. They have two children, son Boris and daughter Billie.

== Club career ==
Youngs made his Leicester Tigers first team début on 11 February 2007 in a friendly match against Argentina at Welford Road, the match marked Graham Rowntree's final Leicester appearance. On 24 April 2007, at the age of 17 years and 231 days, he became Leicester's youngest ever player used in a league match when he came off the bench against Bristol. Later that season, he played in the final of the 2006–07 Guinness Premiership.

Youngs played 10 games for Leicester in the 2007–08 season, principally whilst Harry Ellis was injured. Despite starting only 2 games, but featuring in 17, Youngs finished third in the 2008–09 Guinness Premiership Discovery of the Season award and won the club's player's young player of the year award.

Youngs was instrumental in Leicester's 22–17 defeat of the Springboks in a tour match on 6 November 2009 kicking 17 points. He was able to establish himself as first choice in 2009–10 season starting 23 games. In February 2010, Youngs signed a new contract. His teammates voted him Leicester Tigers Player of the Season for 2009/10. In a season littered with awards, he also picked up the Land Rover Discovery of the Season award. He crowned off the season by playing in the 2009–10 Guinness Premiership final victory over Saracens, scoring a try in the process.

Youngs has also played in losing Premiership finals in 2011 and 2012, as well as starting in the 2013 final where Leicester defeated Northampton to seal their 10th English championship.

On 8 April 2017, in a game against Bath at Twickenham, Youngs made his 200th appearance for Leicester. Following Leicester's home game with Newcastle Youngs was presented with an engraved silver picture frame in recognition of the feat. Youngs made his 250th appearance for Leicester Tigers on 13 September 2020 in a match against Northampton Saints played at an empty Welford Road Stadium due to the COVID-19 pandemic, Youngs scored a try in a 28–24 win for Leicester.

Youngs played as a replacement in the 2022 Premiership Rugby final as Tigers beat Saracens 15-12.

In 2024, he underwent a two-hour open heart surgery operation to treat supraventricular tachycardia and another unspecified arrhythmia, conditions he had been suffering from for some time, after collapsing during a game in Leicester's stadium.

In April 2025, he announced his decision to retire from the professional game at the end of the 2024–25 season. His final game of professional rugby was the Premiership final. Despite helping to reduce the gap from 13 points down to 2, Bath eventually defeated them 23–21.

== International career ==
=== England ===
Youngs has played for England U-16, U-18 and in March 2008 was a member of the England under-20 team that won the grand slam. Later that month, Youngs made his debut for the England Sevens team at the Hong Kong sevens. Youngs played in the final of both the 2008 IRB Junior World Championship. and 2009 IRB Junior World Championship. He was selected for the revised England Saxons Squad on 13 January 2010, and upgraded to the revised Senior Squad as injury cover for Harry Ellis on 25 January 2010. Later that month, he made his debut for the England Saxons, against Ireland A.

Youngs made his senior England debut as a substitute on the wing for the injured Ugo Monye in the Calcutta Cup match against Scotland on 13 March 2010, and was an unused replacement in the match against France. He continued as part of the senior squad on their tour of Australia, and played in both Test matches.

Youngs made his first international start in England's 21 – 20 win over Australia in Sydney, on 19 June 2010. He played an important role in improving the England gameplan in the game, and scored a solo try in the first half. On 13 November 2010, Youngs was awarded man of the match award for his outstanding performance against Australia. Youngs continued to be a steadfast member of the England squad, including call ups for the 2011, 2015 and 2019 Rugby World Cups.

After Eddie Jones replaced Stuart Lancaster as England head coach after the 2015 RWC, Youngs continued to play a crucial role in the England squad, being one of two ever-present scrum-halves, along with Danny Care. Youngs played in all but one (vs Uruguay) of England's record-equaling run of 18 consecutive wins, starting 15 of them.

This run included the 2016 Grand Slam achieved through a win against the French in Paris, avenging the defeat to Ireland in a match of similar importance in 2011, in addition to being part of the side that secured a 3-0 series triumph against Australia only a couple of months after the tournament ended. Later in the year, he put in some of his most memorable performances against South Africa and again against Australia in that year's Autumn Internationals, scoring and assisting several tries using his trademark show-and-go off the base of a ruck.

Youngs was part of further Six Nations victories in 2017 and 2020, scoring two tries in the 2020 title decider against Italy to mark his 100th cap in style. Youngs is only the second Englishman to reach this number after Jason Leonard, and immediately went on to win a further four caps in the inaugural Amazon Autumn Nations Cup as England secured their second piece of silverware of the year. Youngs has said that the enforced break from rugby due to the Coronavirus crisis left him refreshed and recharged, and has stated his aim is to be a part of the England team for the 2023 World Cup in France, which would mark his fourth such tournament having been a part of the 2011, 2015 and 2019 squads.

On 26 February 2022, Youngs became England's most capped international player, surpassing Jason Leonard's record of 114 caps.

On 7 August 2023, Youngs was named in England's squad for the 2023 Rugby World Cup. He announced his retirement shortly before winning his 127th cap against Argentina in the third place playoff.

=== British & Irish Lions ===
In April 2013, Youngs was announced as one of three scrum-halves for the 2013 British & Irish Lions tour to Australia alongside Mike Phillips and Conor Murray. He made 2 capped appearances, off the bench for the first test in Brisbane, and then starting the second test in Melbourne alongside his brother Tom Youngs. He also made uncapped appearances against 5 provincial sides, scoring 2 tries.

Youngs was again selected as one of the three scrum-halves in April 2017 for the 2017 British & Irish Lions tour to New Zealand, alongside previous tourist Conor Murray and newcomer Rhys Webb, with Leicester Tigers teammate Dan Cole also being selected again. However, on 6 May 2017, Youngs withdrew himself from the tour party due to family reasons and was replaced by Scotland international Greig Laidlaw.

== Career statistics ==
=== List of international tries ===
As of 17 November 2021

Try	Opposing team	Location	Venue	Competition	Date	Result	Score
1	Australia	Sydney, Australia	ANZ Stadium		19 June 2010	Win	21 – 20
2	Argentina	Dunedin, New Zealand	Forsyth Barr Stadium	2011 Rugby World Cup	10 September 2011	Win	13 – 9
3	Romania	Dunedin, New Zealand	Forsyth Barr Stadium	2011 Rugby World Cup	24 September 2011	Win	67 – 3
4	Ireland	London, England	Twickenham Stadium	2012 Six Nations	17 March 2012	Win	30 – 9
5	South Africa	Johannesburg, South Africa	Ellis Park Stadium		16 June 2012	Loss	27 – 36
6	South Africa	Johannesburg, South Africa	Ellis Park Stadium		16 June 2012	Loss	27 – 36
7	Italy	London, England	Twickenham Stadium	2015 Six Nations	14 February 2015	Win	47 – 17
8	France	London, England	Twickenham Stadium	2015 Six Nations	21 March 2015	Win	55 – 35
9	France	London, England	Twickenham Stadium	2015 Six Nations	21 March 2015	Win	55 – 35
10	Wales	London, England	Twickenham Stadium		29 May 2016	Win	27 – 13
11	Australia	London, England	Twickenham Stadium	2016 Autumn Internationals	3 December 2016	Win	37 – 21
12	Wales	Cardiff, Wales	Millennium Stadium	2017 Six Nations	11 February 2017	Win	21 – 16
13	Italy	Newcastle upon Tyne, England	St James's Park		6 September 2019	Win	37 – 0
14	Argentina	Tokyo, Japan	Ajinomoto Stadium	2019 Rugby World Cup	5 October 2019	Win	39 – 10
15	Italy	Rome, Italy	Stadio Olimpico	2020 Six Nations	31 October 2020	Win	34 – 5
16	Italy	Rome, Italy	Stadio Olimpico	2020 Six Nations	31 October 2020	Win	34 – 5
17	Wales	Cardiff, Wales	Millennium Stadium	2021 Six Nations	27 February 2021	Loss	24 – 40
18	Ireland	Dublin, Ireland	Aviva Stadium	2021 Six Nations	20 March 2021	Loss	18 – 32
19	Tonga	London, England	Twickenham Stadium	2021 Autumn Internationals	6 November 2021	Win	69 – 3
20	Tonga	London, England	Twickenham Stadium	2021 Autumn Internationals	6 November 2021	Win	69 – 3

== Honours ==
British & Irish Lions

- 1× Test Series Win: 2013

England

- Six Nations Championship: 2011, 2016, 2017, 2020
- Grand Slam: 2016
- Rugby World Cup runners-up: 2019
- Rugby World Cup third place: 2023

Leicester Tigers

- Premiership Rugby: 2007, 2009, 2010, 2013, 2022
- Anglo-Welsh Cup : 2007, 2012, 2017
- Premiership Rugby runner-up: 2011, 2012
- EPCR Challenge Cup runner-up: 2021
