= George Reed (footballer) =

English footballer and coach

Personal information
- Full name: George Reed
- Date of birth: 7 February 1904
- Place of birth: Altofts, Yorkshire, England
- Date of death: 29 November 1958 (aged 54)
- Place of death: Bristol, England
- Position: Left half

Youth career
- Altofts

Senior career*
Years	Team	Apps	(Gls)
1924–1931	Leeds United	141	(2)
1931–1934	Plymouth Argyle	46	(1)
1934–1935	Crystal Palace	2	(0)
1935–1936	Clapton Orient	1	(0)
1936–1938	King's Lynn		

Managerial career
- 1936–1938: King's Lynn (player-manager)
- * Club domestic league appearances and goals

George Reed (7 February 1904 – 29 November 1958) was an English football player and coach who played as a left half. Born in Altofts, Yorkshire, he began his professional career with nearby Leeds United in October 1924. He made his Football League debut on 6 April 1926, in a 2–0 home defeat to Sunderland. In the next three and a half seasons, he missed just eight games, and in April 1930, he and teammate Harry Roberts shared a benefit match against Manchester United. He and Roberts both left for Plymouth Argyle at the end of the 1930–31 season, with Reed having appeared exactly 150 times for Leeds in all competitions, scoring three goals.

Reed made his debut for Plymouth on 12 September 1931, in a 3–3 draw at home to Bradford City, and made a total of 48 appearances before leaving at the end of the 1933–34 season. His final appearance came on 26 December 1933, a 2–1 away defeat to Nottingham Forest. He then moved to Crystal Palace, where he also served as reserve team trainer, but managed just two appearances in his one season there before moving to Clapton Orient. He made one appearance for Orient, in April 1936, before joining non-league King's Lynn as player-manager for the 1936–37 season. After the Second World War, he returned to Plymouth as the club's assistant trainer. While running to change trains at Bristol after a scouting assignment at Coventry City on 29 November 1958, he suffered a heart attack and died.

Reed's great-grandson is Wales international rugby union player Sam Warburton.
