= Cawston College =

Location
- Cawston, Norfolk, NR10 4JD; England; 52.7755°N 1.2066°E

Information
- Type: Independent
- Motto: Animo ac Fide (With spirit and faith)
- Religious affiliation: Church of England
- Established: 1964
- Founder: Canon Alfred Woodard
- Closed: 1999
- Gender: Mixed
- Affiliations: Woodard Schools and HMC

Cawston College (1964-1999) was an independent co-educational day and boarding school, situated in the village of Cawston Norfolk in the United Kingdom. It was a Woodard School.

== History ==
Cawston Manor had been constructed by George Yeates builder on behalf of George Cawston, an English stockbroker, who settled in the area in 1897. The architect of the Manor House was Sir Ernest George well respected in his designs, who mentored the famous architect Edward Lutyens. George Cawston beguiled by the fact that the village had his name, bought land near the village of Cawston. He had one son Cecil Faulkner Cawston. Whose godfather was Cecil Rhodes, long time friend of George Cawston. Cecil Rhodes travelled on a number of occasions from Rhodesia to stay at the Manor House. When George Cawstons only son Cecil was killed in the Boer War in South Africa in 1901, the Cawstons were heart broken. In memory of their son, stained glass windows and brass plaque dedicated to their son can be found in one of the naves in Norwich Cathedral. In order for the construction of the new Manor House in 1897, builder George Yeates had to locate a good fresh water supply, this was located by water divining to the west of the Manor. Here a 90 ft beautifully designed water tower (Dutch style) by Sir Ernest George was constructed complete with internal 100 ft fresh water well. A cast iron pipe was laid from the new tower to the area of construction for the new Manor House, to supply fresh water for the construction and good potable water.

=== School ===
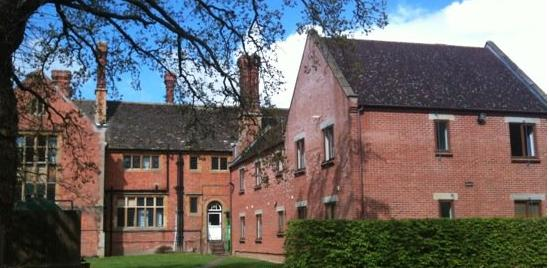
Elizabeth boarding house and main school building

Cawston College, one of the Woodard Schools, opened in 1964 at the former manor house of Cawston, Norfolk, with Mr. John Asquith as Headmaster. It was an independent Christian College with its own Chapel for day and boarding boys and later included girls.

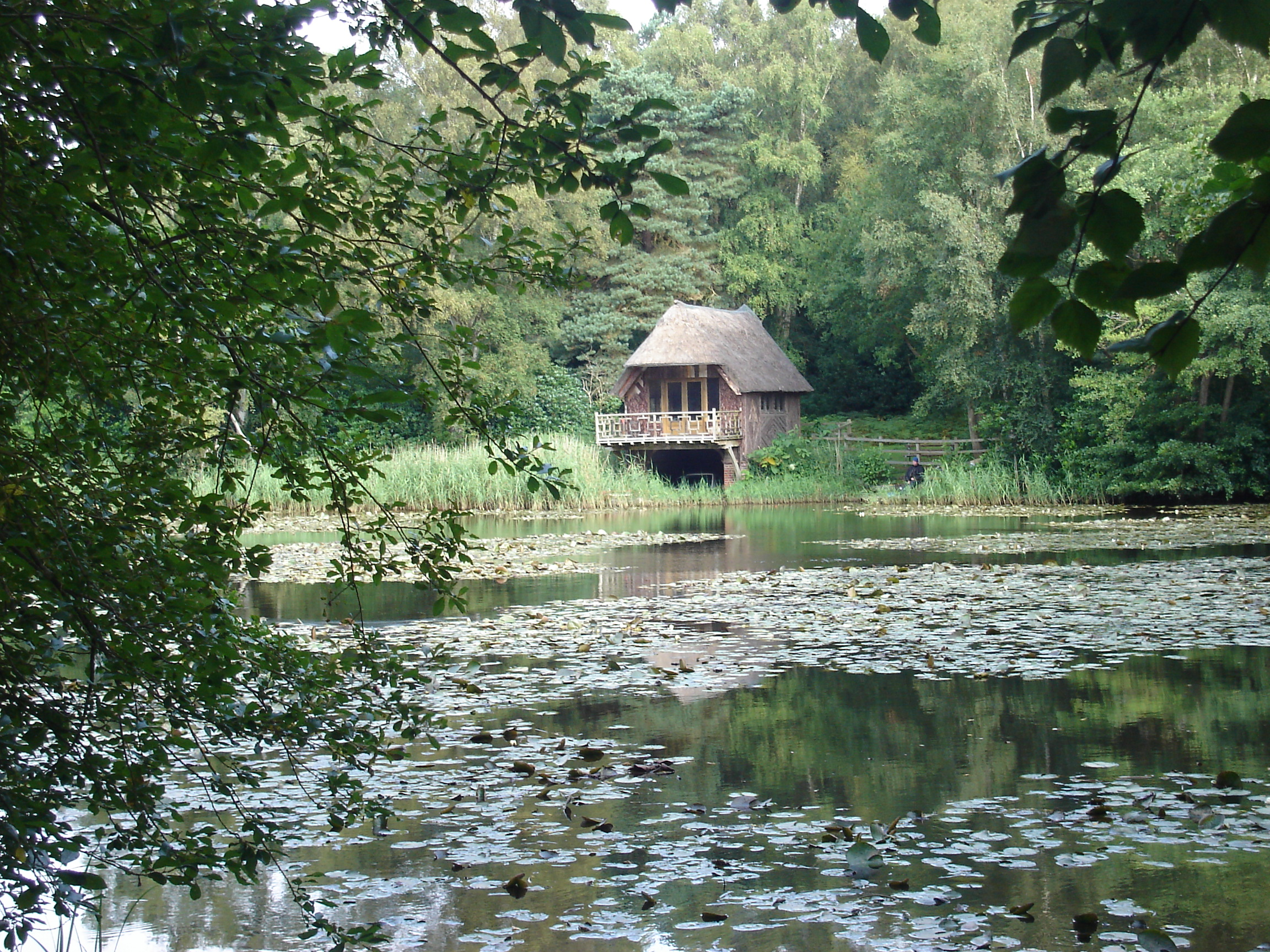
Lake and boathouse

Headmasters:-

- 1964 John P.K. Asquith
- 1986 James Berry
- 1991 John Sutton
- On the retirement of Mr Sutton, Mrs Barbara Harrison took over and stayed until the College closed.

=== Hospital ===
After closure the main school buildings were used by International Foundation of Inspiration, Spirituality and Healing (IFISH), who used it for the study, promotion and practice of psychic science and spiritual healing until 2003.

The site then became the home of Cawston Park psychiatric hospital. In November 2006 former Tory MP David Prior, non-executive chairman of Cawston Park was arrested among others by Norfolk Constabulary who were investigating allegiations of financial irregularities. He was cleared of involvement in the alleged fraud on 15 February 2007 The hospital closed in 2009 in the aftermath of the trial, along with its sister unit Kelling Park near Holt, after owners Chancellor Care went into administration. In 2010 it was sold to the Jeesal Group for use as a specialist hospital providing treatment for adults with learning difficulties and problems including mental-health breakdowns.

=== Current use ===
The school's old water tower has been converted into a house by former pupil David (Ronnie) Forster. This conversion has been featured on Channel 5's Build a New Life in the Country. The conversion took 15 years to complete. The building is grade II listed with a miniature tower added to the main Tower. Views from the very top of the Tower show the east Anglian coastline and before the trees had grown, a view of Norwich Cathedral Spire.

== Notable former pupils ==
- Nick Youngs, England scrum-half.
- Herbie Hide, the heavyweight boxer, was a pupil at the College in the 1980s.
- Jacyn Heavens, the serial entrepreneur, CEO & Founder of Epos Now.
- David Forster, known for his conversion of the Cawston Water Tower, explored on Channel 5's Build a New Life in the Country, hosted by George Clarke.
