= Matt Stevens (rugby union) =

British Lions & England international rugby union player

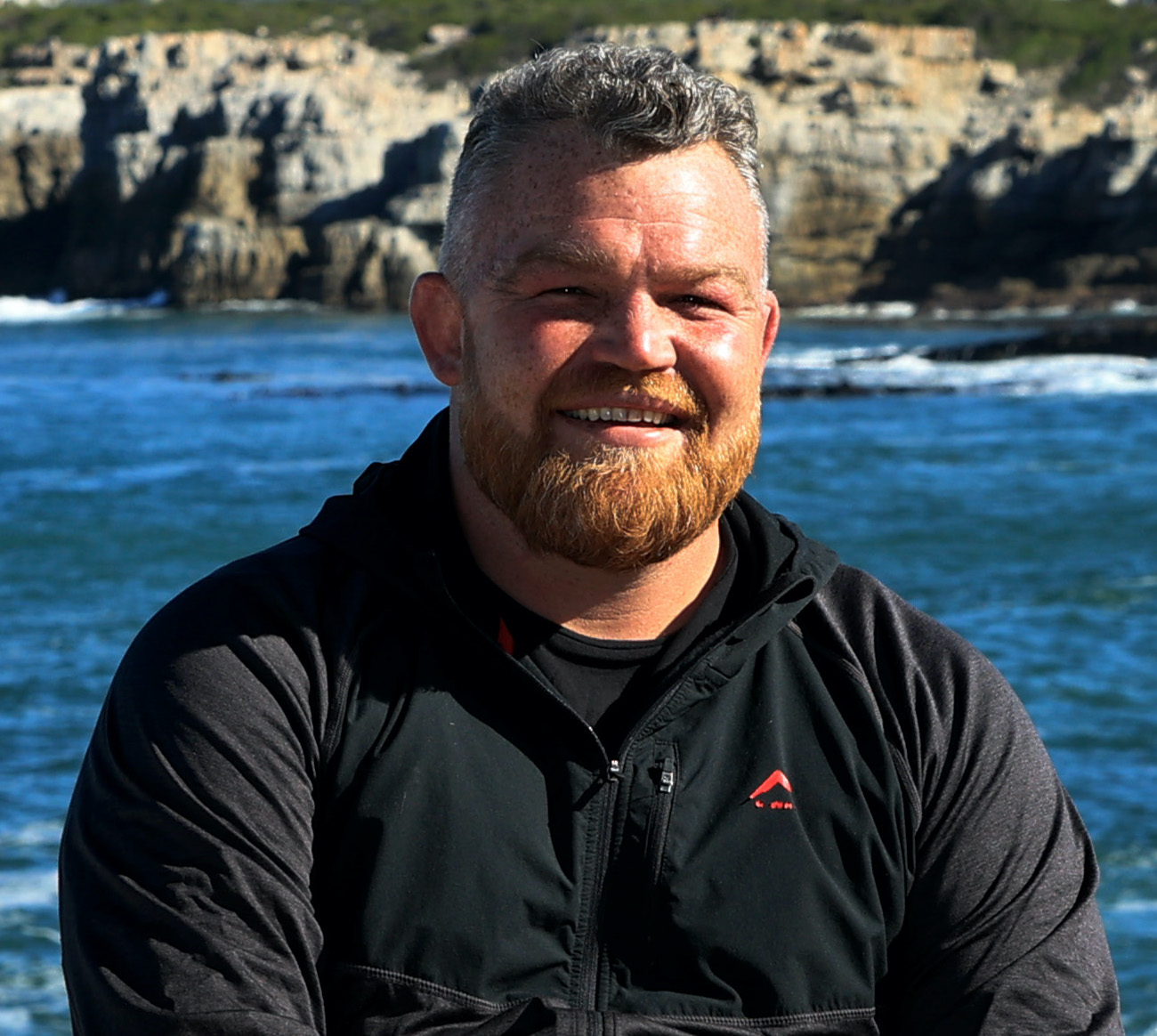
- Stevens in 2022
- Full name: Matthew John Hamilton Stevens
- Born: 1 October 1982 (age 44) Durban, South Africa
- Height: 1.85 m (6 ft 1 in)
- Weight: 122 kg (19 st 3 lb; 269 lb)
- School: Kearsney College
- University: University of Bath

Rugby union career
- Position: Prop
- Current team: Toulon
Youth career
- 2002: Western Province
Senior career
Years	Team	Apps	(Points)
2002–2009	Bath	120	(60)
2010–2014	Saracens	13	(10)
2014–2015	Sharks (Currie Cup)	10	(0)
2015	Sharks	8	(0)
2015–2016	Toulon	7	(0)
- Correct as of 14 June 2015
International career
Years	Team	Apps	(Points)
2004–2012	England	39	(0)
2005, 2013	British & Irish Lions	0	(0)
- Correct as of 8 May 2015

Matthew John Hamilton Stevens (born 1 October 1982) is a retired rugby union player who played club Rugby in England, South Africa and France and won 44 caps for England between 2004 and 2012. Born in Durban, South Africa, to English parents, he played both prop positions, and most of his England appearances were at tighthead. Now based in Cape Town, Stevens is a hospitality expert and property developer.

== Early life ==
Stevens was born on 1 October 1982 in Durban, South Africa. He was educated at Kearsney College and played his youth rugby in South Africa. He earned representative honours for Western Province, South African Universities and the Junior Springboks at Under 18 and Under 19 level, before deciding to move to England to pursue his university studies.

== Rugby career ==
At the University of Bath, he soon came to the attention of Bath Rugby and made his first appearances at the end of the 2002–03 season.

He went on to represent England Under-21s at the 2003 Rugby World Cup, held in Oxfordshire, impressing the first team coaches and winning a place on the summer tour to New Zealand and Australia. He made his first Test appearance as a replacement against the All Blacks before helping Bath to the top of the Premiership table in the 2003–04 season. Stevens was known for popping up in the back line during matches for Bath, and has quite a turn of pace for a front-rower.

He made his Six Nations debut in 2005 and a series of eye-catching displays led to his selection for the 2005 Lions tour to New Zealand. He played in six games for the unbeaten midweek team, but was unable to force his way into the Test side.

A shoulder injury during the 2006 Six Nations would rule Stevens out for over a year, with his next international action coming in the second test of England's summer tour of South Africa in 2007. Stevens was then included in the England squad for the 2007 World Cup, starting three pool games and featuring in all others as a replacement – appearing in the final as a replacement for captain Phil Vickery.

He devoted much of his time out of the game to a coffee shop, Jika Jika, with friend and Bath team-mate Lee Mears. After opening the flagship cafe in Bath in 2009, the pair opened a further 3 cafes in Bath, Bristol and London. Stevens confirmed in January 2010 that he would join Saracens and duly linked up with the English Premiership club at the start of 2011.

He made his debut for Saracens and went on to a central role as the Watford-based club claimed their first Premiership title with victory over Leicester in the final at Twickenham in May 2011. Two days later Stevens was recalled to the England setup with a place in the England Saxons squad for the Churchill Cup and the promise of a shot at securing a spot in Martin Johnson's Rugby World Cup squad.

Stevens finally made his return to the senior England side as he started England's first World Cup warm-up match against Wales at Twickenham, and he did enough to secure a place on the plane to New Zealand. Following an injury to first-choice loose-head Andrew Sheridan, Stevens took the No.1 jersey.

Stevens kept his place in the England set-up under Stuart Lancaster's leadership and played in all five of their matches during the 2012 Six Nations.

In the summer of 2012 Stevens opted to retire from Test rugby to spend more time with his young family. Even so, impressive performances for Saracens and the ability to play on both the tight and loose-head side of the scrums meant that he was a surprise inclusion in Warren Gatland's Lions squad for the tour to Australia, despite not having played international rugby for over a year.

In February 2014, it was revealed that Stevens would return to South Africa after the conclusion of the 2013–14 English Premiership season to join the Sharks in August of that year on a two-year deal.

On 18 June 2015, Stevens made his move to France to join with European champions Toulon in the Top 14 from the 2015–2016 season. He was injured towards the end of his first season at Toulon and underwent shoulder surgery in early 2016. Stevens retired from Rugby in May 2016.

== Ban for drug usage ==
In January 2009, Stevens was suspended after testing positive for a banned substance after Bath’s Heineken Cup match with Glasgow in December 2008. The substance was later confirmed to be cocaine and Stevens was subsequently banned for two years, expiring on January 18, 2011. Stevens later announced that he would leave Bath before he was sacked.

Stevens later said he was "relieved to be caught" and described the ban as "the best thing that has happened to me". He returned to rugby when he played for Saracens 'A' team against Wasps 'A' on 24 January 2011.

== Personal life ==
In 2006, Stevens appeared on The X Factor: Battle of the Stars on ITV. He was mentored by Sharon Osbourne and reached the final only to be defeated by Eastenders star Lucy Benjamin. Due to his appearance on the show, he raised over £125,000 for the Nelson Mandela Children's Fund and in October 2006 he was invited to meet the statesman in Johannesburg.

He holds a BSc in politics with economics from the University of Bath.

After retiring from Rugby, Stevens moved to Cape Town, South Africa. From 2017 – 2020 Stevens was the General Manager at one of South Africa's oldest and most beloved wine estates Boschendal. During his time at Boschendal, he created some of the estate's most popular attractions including The Tree House and the Friday Night Market as well as steering its flagship restaurant The Werf into South Africa's Top 20 Restaurants and winning the Eat Out Sustainability Award in 2018.

Following the onset of the COVID-19 pandemic, Stevens left his position at Boschendal to pursue new property development projects in Cape Town and the wider Western Cape areas.
