= Tim Metcher =

Australian rugby union player

- Born: Timothy Metcher; 10 May 1991 (age 35) Maroubra, New South Wales
- Height: 1.80 m (5 ft 11 in)
- Weight: 115 kg (18 st 2 lb)

Rugby union career
- Position: Prop
Senior career
Years	Team	Apps	(Points)
2010	Gungahlin Eagles		
2011	Randwick		
2012–2017	Southern Districts	42	(0)
2014	NSW Country Eagles	0	(0)
2015–2016	Melbourne Rising	8	(0)
2018–present	Seattle Seawolves	33	(5)
2019	→Counties Manukau	9	(0)
- Correct as of 25 February 2021
Provincial / State sides
Years	Team	Apps	(Points)
2013	Force	1	(0)
Super Rugby
Years	Team	Apps	(Points)
2015−2017	Rebels	6	(0)
- Correct as of 5 November 2017
International career
Years	Team	Apps	(Points)
2011	Australia U20	2	(0)
- Correct as of 25 February 2021

Tim Metcher (born 10 May 1991), is an Australian rugby union player. His usual position is prop. As of 2018, he plays for U.S. team Seattle Seawolves in Major League Rugby (MLR). Metcher previously played for the Rebels in the Super Rugby competition.

== Early life ==
Metcher was born in Maroubra but spent most of his early years in Coffs Harbour on the North Coast of New South Wales. He represented New South Wales at the Australian Schools Rugby Championships.

== Rugby career ==
Metcher played club rugby for the Gungahlin Eagles before being selected to join the Brumbies academy in 2011. He joined Sydney club Randwick that year and played for Australia U-20 at the 2011 IRB Junior World Championship in Italy. He switched to the Southern Districts club in 2012.

In 2013, Metcher played against the British and Irish Lions twice – firstly off the bench for the Western Force, and then starting as tighthead prop for Combined NSW-QLD Country. In early 2014 he was selected in the Gen Blue Waratahs development side to play in the Pacific Rugby Cup. Later in 2014 he joined the NSW Country Eagles squad, before signing with Melbourne. Metcher made six Super Rugby appearances for the Rebels and eight National Rugby Championship appearances for the Rising from 2015 to 2016.

He moved to the United States and began playing with the Seattle Seawolves in 2018.

== Super Rugby statistics ==
As of 6 November 2017

Season	Team	Games	Starts	Sub	Mins	Tries	Cons	Pens	Drops	Points	Yel	Red
2015	Rebels	2	0	2	6	0	0	0	0	0	0	0
2016	Rebels	4	0	4	115	0	0	0	0	0	0	0
2017	Rebels	0	0	0	0	0	0	0	0	0	0	0
Total		6	0	6	115	0	0	0	0	0	0	0
