= Tom Cox (rugby union) =

Australian rugby union player

- Born: Tom Cox; 4 October 1988 (age 38) Sunshine Coast, Australia
- Height: 1.86 m (6 ft 1 in)
- Weight: 92 kg (14 st 7 lb)
- School: Immanuel Lutheran College
- University: University of Queensland

Rugby union career
- Position: Left-Wing / Right-Wing / Outside-Centre / Fullback
Amateur team(s)
Years	Team	Apps	(Points)
- Sunshine Coast Stingrays
–	University of Queensland		
Super Rugby
Years	Team	Apps	(Points)
2012–13	Brumbies	0	(0)

Tom Cox (born 4 October 1988) is an Australian rugby union player. His playing position is winger, centre or fullback.

He joined the Brumbies Super Rugby squad prior to the 2012 Super Rugby season on a two-year deal. He made one senior appearance for them, against Wales during the 2012 Wales rugby union tour of Australia. Post shoulder surgery he joined the Rebels Wider Training Squad for the 2014 Super Rugby season but was hampered by ankle injury.

After taking time to complete university degrees at the University of Queensland, he joined the Timișoara Saracens prior to the 2015 SuperLiga season.
