= Phoenix Battye =

Australian rugby union player

- Born: Phoenix Battye; 28 September 1990 (age 36) Cooma, New South Wales, Australia
- Height: 2.04 m (6 ft 8 1/2 in)
- Weight: 124 kg (19 st 7 lb)
- School: Marist College Canberra

Rugby union career
- Position: Lock
Senior career
Years	Team	Apps	(Points)
2014–2017	Béziers	77	(5)
2017–present	Oyonnax	118	(30)
- Correct as of 13 October 2023
Super Rugby
Years	Team	Apps	(Points)
2011–2014	Force	12	(0)
- Correct as of 3 June 2014

Phoenix Battye (born 28 September 1990) is an Australian rugby union player. He currently plays in the French Pro D2 competition but started his professional career with the Western Force. His usual position is lock.

Off the field, Battye has a passion for the arts, with his portrait Battye Blue appearing on the National Portrait Gallery's website.

== Career ==
In early 2012, Battye upgraded from a rookie to professional contract with the Western Force Super Rugby club. Battye made his Super Rugby debut on 3 March 2012 against the Queensland Reds.

After three seasons playing for the Western Force, Battye joined French side Béziers prior to the 2014–15 Rugby Pro D2 season.
