= Joshua Mann-Rea =

Australian rugby union player (born 1981)

- Born: Joshua Mann-Rea; 19 February 1981 (age 45) Narromine, New South Wales, Australia
- Height: 1.81 m (5 ft 11 1/2 in)
- Weight: 105 kg (16 st 7 lb)

Rugby union career
- Position: Hooker
Senior career
Years	Team	Apps	(Points)
2007	Ballymore Tornadoes	7	(10)
2009-2011	Kyuden Voltex	?	(?)
2014	NSW Country Eagles	2	(0)
2016−	Canberra Vikings	3	(25)
- Correct as of 22 February 2017
Super Rugby
Years	Team	Apps	(Points)
2012	Waratahs	2	(0)
2013–2019	Brumbies	43	(15)
- Correct as of 22 July 2016
International career
Years	Team	Apps	(Points)
2014−	Australia	2	(0)
- Correct as of 19 October 2014

Joshua Mann-Rea (born 19 February 1981) is a rugby union player. He currently plays for the ACT Brumbies in the southern hemisphere Super Rugby competition. Late in his career, he made his international debut from the bench in Australia's 2014 Championship win against South Africa in Perth. He plays in the position of Hooker.

He is 181 cm tall and weights 105 kg. Mann-Rea made his Super Rugby debut for the Waratahs against the Stormers in 2012 during round 13. He previously spent several seasons playing in Japan with Top League club Kyuden Voltex.

Mann-Rea was named in the Brumbies Extended Playing Squad for the 2013 Super Rugby season

== Super Rugby statistics ==
As of 22 July 2016

Season	Team	Games	Starts	Sub	Mins	Tries	Cons	Pens	Drops	Points	Yel	Red
2012	Waratahs	2	0	2	7	0	0	0	0	0	0	0
2013	Brumbies	1	0	1	10	0	0	0	0	0	0	0
2014	Brumbies	9	3	6	252	0	0	0	0	0	1	0
2015	Brumbies	18	2	16	358	0	0	0	0	0	0	0
2016	Brumbies	15	1	14	397	3	0	0	0	15	0	1
Total		45	6	39	1024	3	0	0	0	15	1	1
