= Richard Stanford (rugby union) =

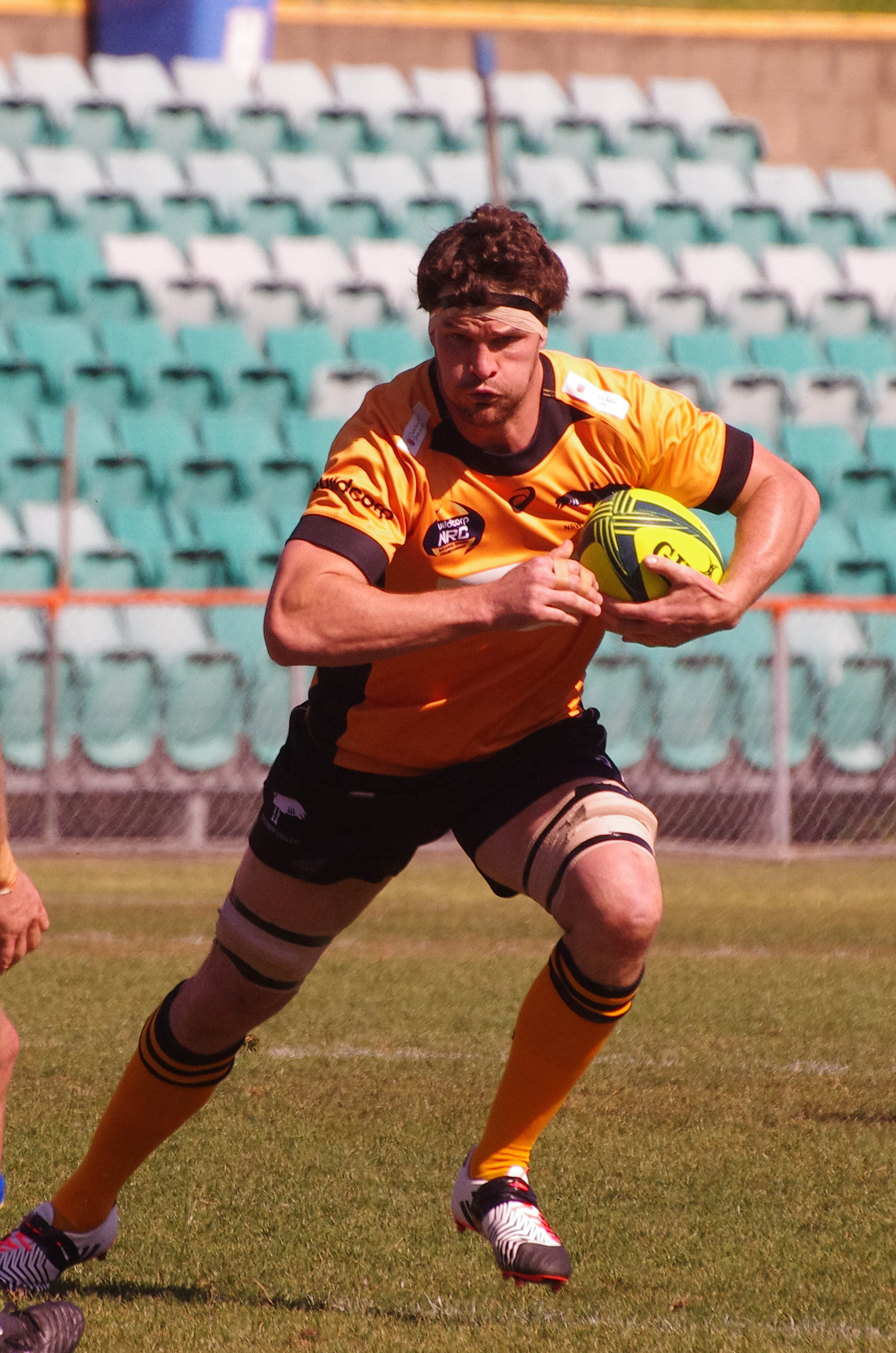
- Born: Richard Stanford; 25 April 1986 (age 40) Wellington, Australia
- Height: 1.96 m (6 ft 5 in)
- Weight: 110 kg (17 st 5 lb)

Rugby union career
- Position: Lock / Flanker
Senior career
Years	Team	Apps	(Points)
2007	Melbourne Rebels	10	(10)
2014−	NSW Country Eagles	4	(0)
- Correct as of 5 December 2014
Super Rugby
Years	Team	Apps	(Points)
2006–2008	Brumbies	6	(0)
2009–2010	Force	11	(0)
2012	Waratahs	2	(0)
- Correct as of 24 July 2012

Richard Stanford (born 25 April 1986) is an Australian rugby union footballer who plays as a lock or flanker. He plays for the Waratahs in Super Rugby having previously represented the Brumbies and Western Force.

He made his senior debut for the Brumbies during the 2006 Super 14 season against the Chiefs.
