= Nathan Trist =

Australian rugby player (born 1982)

- Born: Nathan Trist; 22 December 1982 (age 43) Kiama, Australia
- Height: 1.88 m (6 ft 2 in)
- Weight: 99 kg (15 st 8 lb)
- School: Hurlstone Agricultural High School

Rugby union career
- Position: Full-back
Senior career
Years	Team	Apps	(Points)
2007	Melbourne Rebels	10	(37)
–	Sydney University		
Super Rugby
Years	Team	Apps	(Points)
2012–2013	Waratahs	1	(0)
- Correct as of 21 April 2012

Nathan Trist (born 22 December 1982 in Kiama, Australia) is a rugby union footballer. He plays for the Waratahs in Super Rugby. His regular playing position is outside back.

He made his senior debut during the 2012 Super Rugby season against the Rebels.

== Reference List ==
- https://web.archive.org/web/20120406120117/http://www.nswrugby.com.au/NSWRugby/News/NewsArticle/tabid/374/ArticleID/4621/Default.aspx
- "Togs slog: Tahs stars brief rundown for charity". smh.com.au.
