= Vunipola =

Vunipola is the surname of various members of the rugby-playing Vunipola family that originated in Tonga, including:

- Elisi Vunipola (born 1967), played for Tonga and various clubs
- Manu Vunipola (born c. 1967), played for Tonga, later Minister for Sports in Tonga
- Fe'ao Vunipola (born 1969), played for Tonga and various Welsh clubs
- Mako Vunipola (born 1991), son of Fe'ao, a prop for Saracens, England and the British & Irish Lions
- Billy Vunipola (born 1992), son of Fe'ao, a number 8 for Saracens and England

== See also ==
- Vunipola Fifita (born 1996), Tongan-born Australian rugby union player
