= Manu Vunipola =

Manu Vunipola may refer to:

- Manu Vunipola (rugby union, born 1967), Tongan rugby player and Minister for Sport
- Manu Vunipola (rugby union, born 2000), English rugby player
