= Rockhampton, Gloucestershire =

Village in Gloucestershire, England

Coordinates: 51.638°N 2.512°W

Rockhampton
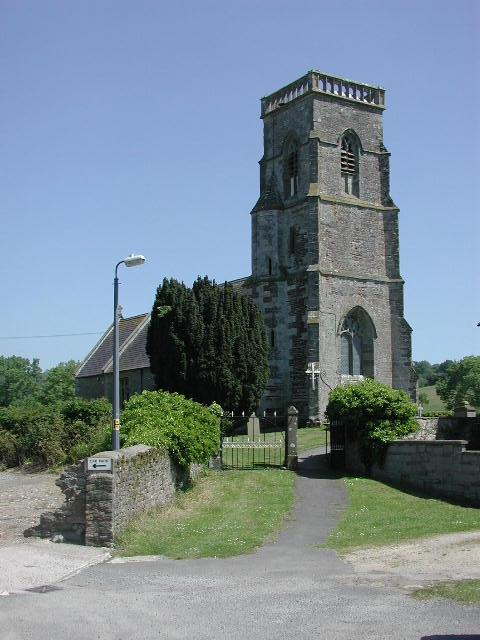
- Church of St Oswald

- Location within Gloucestershire
- Population: 166 (2011 Census)
- OS grid reference: ST6457193419
- Civil parish: Rockhampton
- Unitary authority: South Gloucestershire
- Ceremonial county: Gloucestershire
- Region: South West
- Country: England
- Sovereign state: United Kingdom
- Post town: Berkeley
- Postcode district: GL13
- Dialling code: 01454
- Police: Avon and Somerset
- Fire: Avon
- Ambulance: South Western
- UK Parliament: Thornbury and Yate

Rockhampton is a village and civil parish in the English county of Gloucestershire, situated in the unitary district of South Gloucestershire. It is located 2.8 miles (4.5 km) northeast of Thornbury, 18.6 miles (29.9 km) north of Bristol and is approximately 4 miles (6.4 km) east of the River Severn. It had a population of 166 people according to the 2011 census.

The south end of the village is more properly called Newton, and is in the Thornbury postal area.

== Population ==
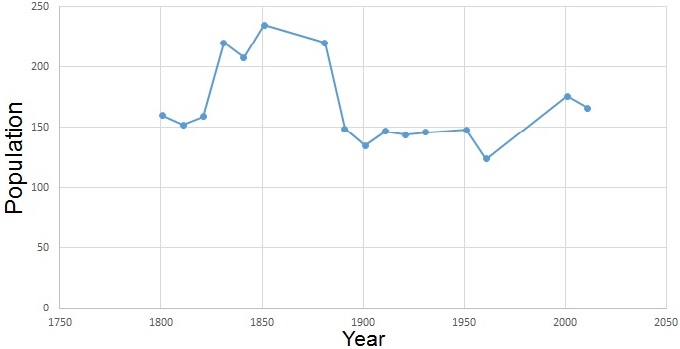
Total Population of Rockhampton Civil Parish, Gloucestershire, as reported by the Census of Population from 1801 to 2011

The population of Rockhampton has only increased by six since the census started in 1801. However, there have been wide variations in population since 1801 until now. The first big variation was an increase of 61 people from 1821 to 1831 when the population reached 220. The population reached its highest point (235) in 1951. The second biggest variation was a decrease of 71 people from 1881 to 1891 when the population fell to 149.

This fall in population was due to Rockhampton civil parish losing the village of Shepperdine to the Thornbury civil parish. Since then until 1961 there was not a lot of variation in population. However, from 1961 there was a big increase of 52 people up to 2001 when the population reached 176.

In 2011, 63% of the population in Rockhampton was aged between 16 and 64 years which means most of the population was working age, 85% of this age group was aged between 30 and 64. On the other hand, 23% of the population was 65 and over, which means there is a small retired community in Rockhampton.

== History ==
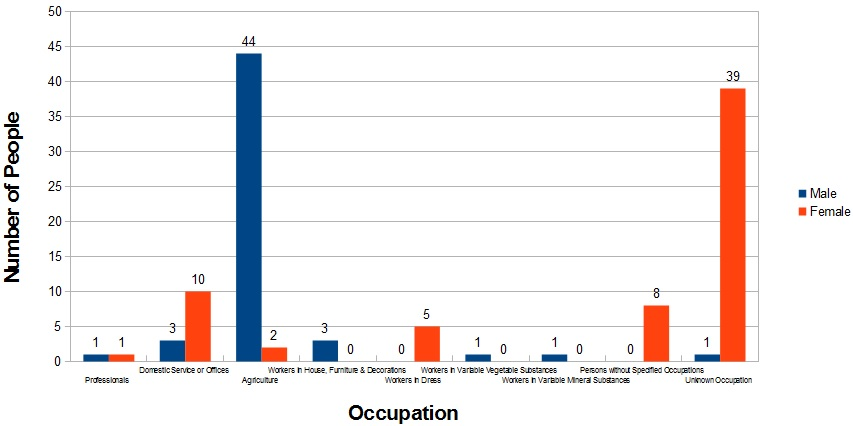
Occupational Structure of Rockhampton in 1881

The Church of St Oswald was mostly built during the 14th century, but some parts were built as early as the 13th century. There are still traces of medieval paintings inside the church. In 1860–61 parts of the church were rebuilt by Kempson of Hereford and in 1960 it was listed as a grade II* English heritage building.

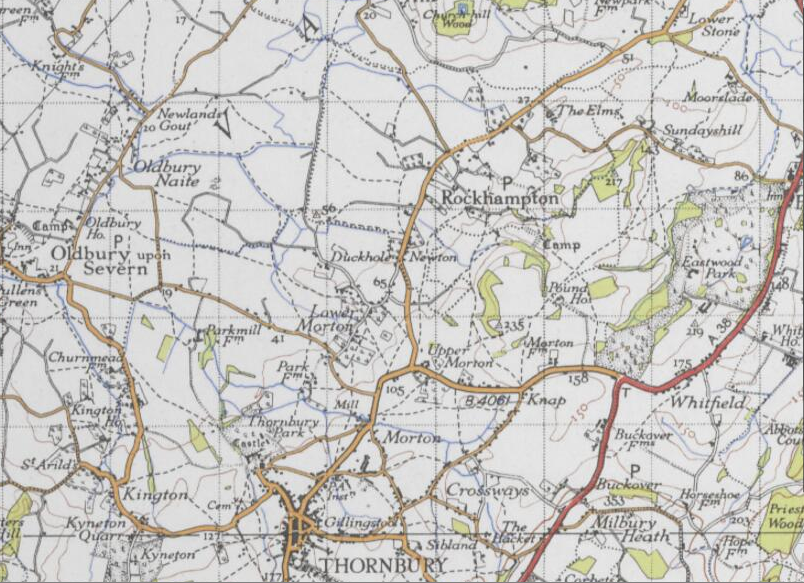
A Map of Rockhampton in 1945

In the 1870s, Rockhampton was described as:

A parish, with a village, in Thornbury district, Gloucester; 2 miles N N E of Thornbury, and 4¾ W by N of Charfield r. station.

During 1881 there was a clear occupational structure for the male population of Rockhampton, with more than 80% of males working in agriculture. However, it was very different for females as 60% were unemployed, but the area where the most females were employed in was domestic services or offices.

Rockhampton village hall, located next to the Church of St Oswald, was originally a village church school with 26 children attending in 1940. However, in the late 1940s the school was shut down, but after some fundraising it was purchased for the residents of Rockhampton in 1983.

== Economy ==
Rockhampton has three small engineering repair works, five working farms, two tree nurseries and an equestrian centre. There are no general shops or pubs. This is similar to the businesses that would have been around in 1881.

Rockhampton is a wealthy rural commuter village and the parish has entrepreneurial people living there with 19% of the population being self-employed. Additionally, 17% of Rockhampton's population is retired and only one person was unemployed according to the 2011 census data. Of the people who were employed in Rockhampton; 18 work in the health industry, 11 work in the retail industry and 10 work in the Professional, Scientific and Technical industry. These industries employed the most people from Rockhampton.

== Education ==
Rockhampton Education & Qualifications Graph 2011

There is no school in Rockhampton civil parish despite the village hall being a former church school. The closest primary school is Manorbrook Primary School (1.2 Miles) and the closest secondary school is The Castle School (1.4 Miles), both are in Thornbury. However, even though Rockhampton doesn't have a school, the parish is well educated with 65 people having a degree or equivalent. Additionally only 10 people in Rockhampton have no qualifications.

== Sports and Leisure ==
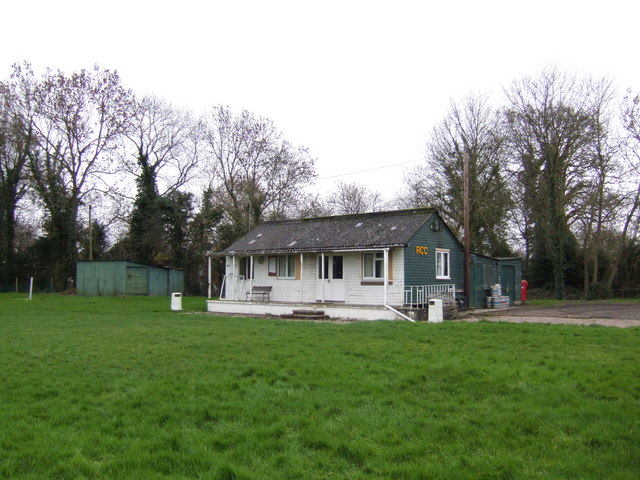
Rockhampton Cricket Club Pavilion

Rockhampton Cricket Club play in the West of England Premier League – Gloucestershire & Wiltshire Division. This is the highest level they have played at, since being founded in 1872. They also reached the Davidstow Village Cup final at Lord's in 2013. The cricket club is one of the village's oldest institutions and was founded by Thomas Jenkins Ford. The village has two cricket grounds with the most recent being opened in 1999.

In 2015, Rockhampton's 1 XI won the Glos/Wilts Division of the West of England Premier League. The same year, Rockhampton's 3 XI won the first division of the Martin Berrill Stroud & District Cricket League.

Thornbury RFC's ground is located in Rockhampton and play in the South West 1 League.

== Housing ==
There is a total of 64 households in Rockhampton according to the 2011 census; 82.8% are detached houses, 10.9% are semi-detached, 3.1% are part of a converted or shared house, 1.6% are purposed-built flats or tenement and 1.6% are terraced housing. Of the 64 households in Rockhampton, 29 were owned outright, 28 were owned with a mortgage, 5 were privately rented from a private landlord or Letting Agency, One had shared ownership and one was socially rented, according to data from the 2011 census. The most people living in one household in Rockhampton is six and the fewest people living in one household is one.

== Notable people ==
- Joel Dommett (born 1985), television presenter, comedian and actor, was born in Rockhampton.
