= The Armstrong =

Venue in South Gloucestershire, England

Coordinates: 51°36′22″N 2°31′32″W

The Armstrong is a community arts and performance venue in Thornbury, South Gloucestershire, England. It occupies the former Armstrong Hall complex on Chapel Street and is undergoing phased redevelopment following its closure in 2020.

The venue is intended to function as a cultural hub for theatre, music and community events, and is operated by the charitable organisation Thornbury Community and Arts under lease from the Armstrong Hall Trust.

== History ==
The Armstrong Hall complex was originally built in 1970, funded by local benefactor Frank Armstrong, and served as Thornbury's principal performance and community venue for several decades.

The complex includes multiple spaces, notably the main Armstrong Hall and the smaller Cossham Hall, which hosted a range of community and performing arts activities.

== Closure and redevelopment ==
The Armstrong was closed in March 2020, due to issues exacerbated by the COVID-19 lockdown of the same year. In 2023, 250 Thornbury residents signed an open letter to the local town council to help them reopen the venue, which was described as "vital" to the town.

Between 2023 and 2024, the Armstrong Hall Trust undertook a public consultation and options appraisal to determine the site's future. Proposals included rebuilding the venue, relocating to a new site or refurbishing the existing buildings.

In July 2024, the Trust announced its decision to refurbish and reopen the existing complex in phases, citing cost considerations and community support.

== Refurbishment and funding ==
The redevelopment has been supported by significant private donations, notably from businesswoman Maggie Lansdown, whose initial £350,000 contribution helped enable the project.

In 2025, this contribution was increased to £1.25 million, providing a major funding boost for renovation works and enabling the first phase of reopening.

The project involves restoration of Cossham Hall, redevelopment of public spaces including a foyer and bar and the longer-term renovation of the main hall, which has been renamed Lansdown Hall in recognition of the donation.

== Reopening as The Armstrong ==
As part of the redevelopment, the venue was rebranded as The Armstrong, reflecting its expanded role beyond a traditional community hall.

The first phase of the project is completed, with the Cossham Hall, foyer and bar open from April 2026, with a programme of events launching for Thornbury Arts Festival.

Further phases dependent on additional fundraising.
