= Taulupe Faletau =

Wales and British Lions international rugby union player

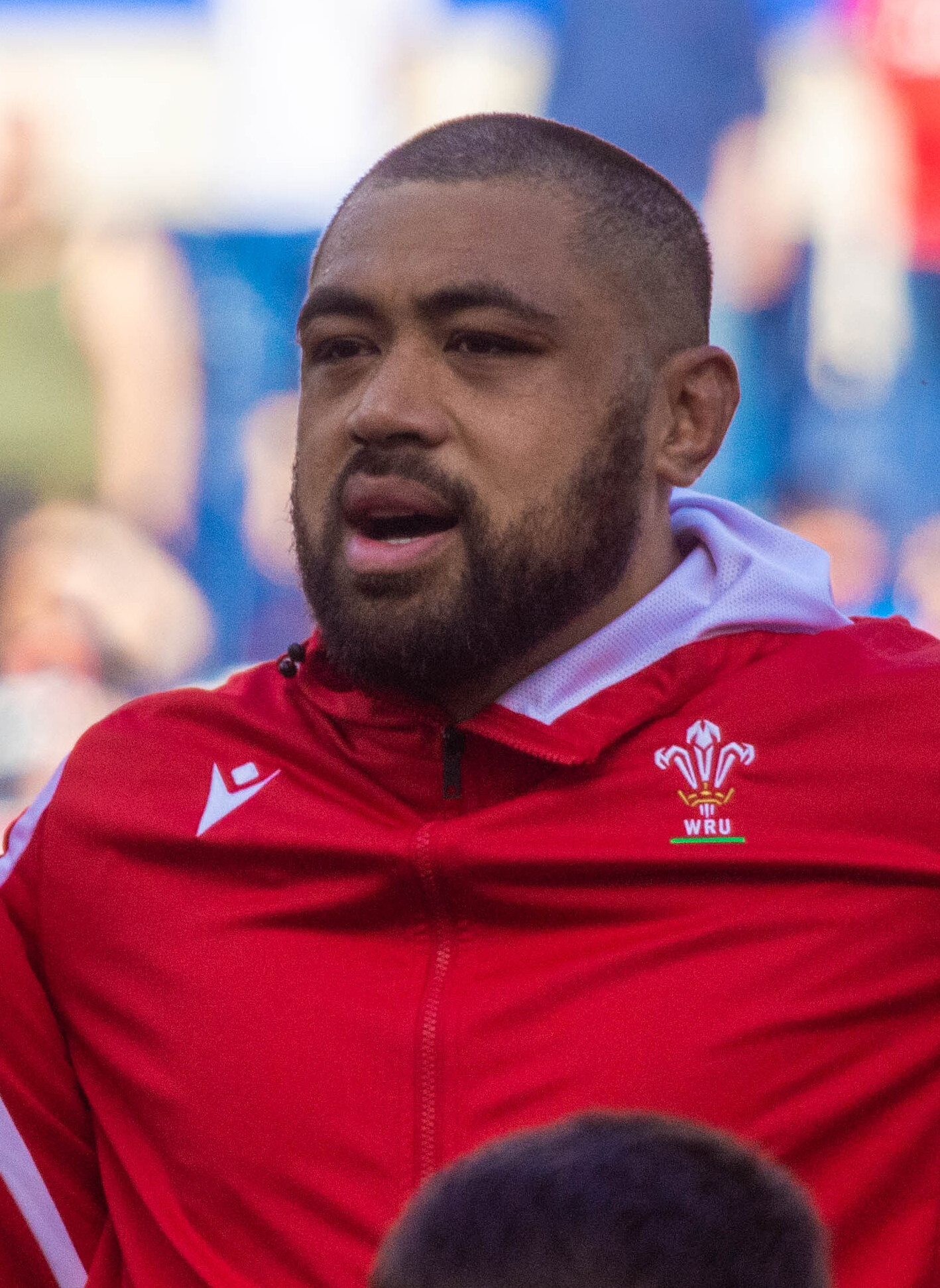
- Faletau with Wales in 2023
- Born: Tangaki Taulupe Faletau; 12 November 1990 (age 36) Tofoa, Tonga
- Height: 1.89 m (6 ft 2 in)
- Weight: 110 kg (243 lb; 17 st 5 lb)
- School: Trevethin Community School; South Gloucestershire and Stroud College
- Notable relatives: Billy Vunipola (cousin); Mako Vunipola (cousin)

Rugby union career
- Position: Number 8
- Current team: Cardiff
Senior career
Years	Team	Apps	(Points)
2009–2016	Newport Gwent Dragons	110	(50)
2016–2022	Bath	71	(50)
2022–	Cardiff	30	(15)
- Correct as of 4 April 2026
International career
Years	Team	Apps	(Points)
2010	Wales U20	3	(0)
2011–	Wales	109	(65)
2013–2021	British & Irish Lions	6	(5)
- Correct as of 22:33, 8 July 2025 (UTC)

Tangaki Taulupe Faletau (born 12 November 1990), commonly known as Toby Faletau but professionally as Taulupe Faletau, is a Welsh professional rugby union player for Cardiff Rugby in the United Rugby Championship and has represented the Wales national team for over 10 years. The back row forward played for Cross Keys RFC, Newport RFC and Newport Gwent Dragons in Wales before joining Bath in 2016. He joined Cardiff in 2022.

== Early life ==
Faletau was born in Tofoa, Tonga, to Tongan international Kuli Faletau, who represented Tonga at the 1999 Rugby World Cup; he started his career at prop but was later moved to number 8. Kuli moved to Wales in 1997 to join Ebbw Vale. Taulupe attended Pontygof Primary School until 1999 and then Pontnewynydd Primary School until July 2002, then attended Trevethin Community School, then attended Filton College (now part of South Gloucestershire and Stroud College) as part of the college's successful rugby academy and was recognised as 'player of the year' during his time at the college.

As a young boy, his school friends struggled to pronounce his Tongan name, and so he picked up the nickname Toby. In recent years, he has requested that his rugby squad name be recorded more accurately as Taulupe, but does not mind being called Toby.

== Early career ==
Faletau spent time during the 2009/2010 season on loan at both Newport RFC where he made 11 appearances scoring 2 tries, and Cross Keys RFC where he made 2 appearances.

Faletau spent his early years in Wales playing for Ebbw Vale RFC and New Panteg RFC juniors alongside Mako and Billy Vunipola until youth level, when he moved to Filton College, Bristol, to experience the English game. Prior to his move across the border, he had suffered several setbacks from both the Gwent District organisation and the Newport Gwent Dragons Regional.

Faletau made his debut for the Newport Gwent Dragons senior team, on 1 November 2009, versus Edinburgh.

On 22 December 2009, he was named in the Wales under-20 Squad for the 2010 Under-20 Six Nations tournament. In May 2010, he was selected for the Wales Under 20 Squad for the Junior World Cup in Argentina in June 2010.

== Club career ==
Faletau played a significant role in Newport Gwent Dragons's run to the semi-finals of the 2014–15 European Rugby Challenge Cup, playing in seven of their eight games during the competition until they were eventually knocked out by Edinburgh.

It was confirmed on 9 December 2015 that, after months of speculation, Faletau would be joining English Premiership side Bath Rugby in time for the 2016–17 season.

On 5 November 2021, it was confirmed that Faletau would return to Wales to join Cardiff in the United Rugby Championship ahead of the 2022-23 season.

Faletau was injured playing for Cardiff against the Ospreys, which would rule him out of the first three Six Nations matches, if selected.

== International career ==
He was first called up to the Wales senior squad on 1 November 2010 following the withdrawal of Ryan Jones and Rob McCusker. In January 2011, he was included in the Wales squad for the 2011 Six Nations Championship. He made his full international debut for Wales versus the Barbarians on 4 June 2011.

In August 2011, he was named in the Wales squad for the 2011 Rugby World Cup in New Zealand. On 11 September 2011, he made his World Cup debut for Wales against South Africa, scoring his first international try in the second half, adding another in the game against Namibia. He finished the tournament as the top tackler and ball carrier, the first time a single player has ever topped both tables. He was the only player to start all seven of Wales' games.

He then appeared in all five matches of Wales' Grand Slam-winning 2012 Six Nations Championship campaign, excelling throughout the championship and making many pundits' team of the tournament.

In May 2012, Faletau was announced in the Wales squad for the three test series against Australia, but he had to withdraw from the squad after suffering a broken hand in the first test in Brisbane.

Faletau also played all five games in Wales' 2013 Six Nations Championship victory, including the 30–3 win over England in the final match.

In April 2013, Faletau was named in the squad for the 2013 British & Irish Lions tour to Australia. After failing to feature in the first two tests, Faletau was named at number 8 in the final test ahead of Jamie Heaslip. The Welshman was impressive, as the Lions beat Australia 41–16 securing their first test series win since 1997. During the same summer, it was announced that Faletau had signed a new three-year deal to remain at the Dragons region until 2016.

Faletau continued to represent Wales in the November 2013 Autumn Series, scoring his third test try against Argentina in a man of the match performance.

On 20 January 2014, Faletau was included in the 32-man Wales squad for the 2014 Six Nations Championship. He started all five games and scored a try in a 51–3 thrashing of Scotland on 15 March, as Wales finished the campaign in 3rd.

On 30 May 2014, Faletau was named in the 32-man squad for the mid-year test series against South Africa after playing in a "Possibles vs Probables" match at the Liberty Stadium, in which he played on the Probables team, which won 55–7. He started both tests on the tour including the narrow 31–30-second test defeat, in which Wales lost after conceding a last minute penalty try.

On 21 October 2014, Faletau was included in the Wales squad for the 2014 Autumn Series, starting all 4 games including a historic victory over South Africa in the final test on 29 November.

Faletau played every minute of Wales' 2015 Six Nations campaign, which included the Round 4 23–16 victory against Ireland in which Wales made a massive 250 tackles to deny the Irish a grand slam, and the final round 61–20 thrashing of Italy, which left Ireland needing to win their game against Scotland by 17 points or more to clinch the championship, which they did.

In advance of the game against Italy in the 2015 Six Nations campaign, the Welsh Rugby Union confirmed that Faletau wished to be known by his birth name, Taulupe Faletau. Faletau was selected for the 2015 Rugby World Cup later that year as part of Wales' 31-man squad. Faletau started in the quarter-final against South Africa on 17 October 2015 and was not subbed off, but Wales unluckily lost to South Africa 19–23, being knocked out of the competition.

Faletau and his childhood friends, Mako and Billy Vunipola, were selected for the British & Irish Lions for their 2017 tour to New Zealand. However, Billy withdrew from the touring squad due to injury, leaving Faletau, as well as his brother to head off on their second Lions tour without him. Vunipola's injury went on to benefit Faletau, as he started the first match on tour, winning Man of the Match against the New Zealand Barbarians on 3 June 2017. Faletau went on to start in wins against the Crusaders and the Māori All Blacks, playing the full 80 minutes in both. Standout performances across the tour allowed Faletau a starting place in all three tests against the All Blacks. On 1 July 2017, Faletau scored the opening try of the second test against the All Blacks in the 59th minute, barging over All Blacks back Israel Dagg to score. Faletau's try inspired a late comeback from the Lions, with both teams down to 14 players, and the Lions went on to make a historic win over the All Blacks that day, beating them 24–21. Faletau finished the 1-1 drawn series without being subbed off for the whole Lions tour and played the most minutes of anyone on tour.

On 11 March 2018, in Wales' match against Italy, in the fifth round of the 2018 Six Nations Championship, Faletau was appointed as captain of the Welsh team for the first time in his career, becoming the 131st player to become captain of Wales' international rugby team. This marked a return from injury for Faletau, who played the full 80 minutes as Wales beat Italy 38–14.

In February 2025, having not played for Wales since 2023 Rugby World Cup due to a series of injuries, Faletau returned to the starting lineup for the second round of the 2025 Six Nations against Italy.

=== International tries ===
==== Wales ====
Try	Opponent	Location	Venue	Tests	Date	Result
1	South Africa	Wellington, New Zealand	Westpac Stadium	2011 Rugby World Cup	11 September 2011	Loss
2	Namibia	New Plymouth, New Zealand	Yarrow Stadium	2011 Rugby World Cup	26 September 2011	Win
3	Argentina	Cardiff, Wales	Millennium Stadium	2013 Autumn Internationals	16 November 2013	Win
4	Scotland	Cardiff, Wales	Millennium Stadium	2014 Six Nations	15 March 2014	Win
5	Ireland	Dublin, Ireland	Lansdowne Road	2016 Six Nations	7 February 2016	Draw
6	England	London, England	Twickenham	2016 Six Nations	12 March 2016	Loss
7	New Zealand	Auckland, New Zealand	Eden Park	2016 Summer Internationals	11 June 2016	Loss
8	Italy	Rome, Italy	Stadio Olimpico	2021 Six Nations	13 March 2021	Win
9	Argentina	Cardiff, Wales	Millennium Stadium	2022 Autumn Internationals	12 November 2022	Win
10	Australia	Cardiff, Wales	Millennium Stadium	2022 Autumn Internationals	26 November 2022	Loss
11	Italy	Rome, Italy	Stadio Olimpico	2023 Six Nations	11 March 2023	Win
12	Portugal	Nice, France	Stade de Nice	2023 Rugby World Cup	16 September 2023	Win

==== British & Irish Lions ====
Try	Opponent	Location	Venue	Tests	Date	Result
1	New Zealand	Wellington, New Zealand	Westpac Stadium	2017 British & Irish Lions tour to New Zealand	1 July 2017	Win
