= William Holwell =

English cleric and writer

William Holwell (1726 – 13 February 1798) was an English cleric and writer.

== Life ==
The eldest son of William Holwell, esq., of Exeter, and Ann Blackall, daughter of Ofspring Blackall, he was born in 1726. He matriculated at Christ Church, Oxford, in December 1741, and graduated B.A. in 1745, M.A. in 1748, and B.D. in 1760.

Holwell was tutor to Lord Beauchamp (the future Francis Ingram-Seymour-Conway, 2nd Marquess of Hertford), and was elected proctor for 1758. He was presented to the vicarage of Thornbury, Gloucestershire by Christ Church in January 1762, was appointed prebendary of Exeter Cathedral in 1776, and was at one time chaplain to George III. He died 13 February 1798.

== Works ==
Holwell wrote:

- Selecti Dionysii Halicarnensis de priscis scriptoribus Tractatus græcè et latinè, 1766.
- The Beauties of Homer, selected from the Iliad, 1775.
- Extracts from Mr. Pope's translation, corresponding with the Beauties of Homer, 1776.
- A Mythological, Etymological, and Historical Dictionary, extracted from the Analysis of Ancient Mythology (with Jacob Bryant), 1793.
