= Elisi Vunipola =

Tonga international rugby union player

- Born: Elisi Busco Vunipola; 5 July 1972 (age 54) Nuku'alofa, Tonga
- Height: 1.70 m (5 ft 7 in)
- Weight: 82 kg (181 lb)
- Notable relative(s): Feʻao Vunipola (brother); Manu Vunipola (brother); Mako Vunipola and Billy Vunipola (nephews); Manu Vunipola (son)

Rugby union career
- Position: Fly-half
Amateur team(s)
Years	Team	Apps	(Points)
2000	Ngongotaha		
Senior career
Years	Team	Apps	(Points)
1990-1997	Toa-ko-Ma'afu RFC		
1997-2000	Sanyo		
2002-2005	Caerphilly		
Provincial / State sides
Years	Team	Apps	(Points)
2000	Bay of Plenty		
Super Rugby
Years	Team	Apps	(Points)
1996	ACT Brumbies		
International career
Years	Team	Apps	(Points)
1990-2005	Tonga	41	(50)

Elisi Busco Vunipola (born 5 July 1972) is a Tongan former rugby union player. He played as a fly-half.

== Early life ==
Vunipola was born on 5 July 1972, in Nuku'alofa, the capital of Tonga.

== Career ==
Vunipola debuted for Tonga in the match against Fiji, in Nuku'alofa, on 24 March 1990. He played the 1995 and 1999 World Cups, earning in total 6 World Cup caps. Although not taking part at the 2003 Rugby World Cup, Vunipola last played for Tonga in the match against France, in Toulouse, on 19 November 2005. At club level, he played for Sanyo, ACT Brumbies, Caerphilly RFC and Bay of Plenty.

== Personal life ==
He is brother of the scrum-half Manu Vunipola and of the hooker Feʻao Vunipola, both Tongan internationals. He is also the uncle of Feʻao's sons, Billy and Mako Vunipola, both England internationals. He is the father of fly-half Manu Vunipola.
