= Miles Normandale =

English rugby union player

- Born: Miles Normandale; 21 September 1991 (age 35) Bristol, England
- Height: 203 cm (6 ft 8 in)
- Weight: 110 kg (17 st 5 lb)
- School: Marlwood School; Colston's School
- University: Cardiff Metropolitan University

Rugby union career
- Position: Lock
- Current team: Rotherham Titans
Senior career
Years	Team	Apps	(Points)
2013–2016	Cardiff Blues	3	(0)
2016–	Rotherham Titans	0	(0)
- Correct as of 21 October 2015

Miles Normandale (born 21 September 1991) is an English rugby union player who plays for Rotherham Titans in the RFU Championship. He is also Welsh qualified through residency.

Normandale made his debut for the Cardiff Blues in 2013 having previously played for Cardiff Metropolitan University RFC where he also studied coaching.
