= Marlwood School =

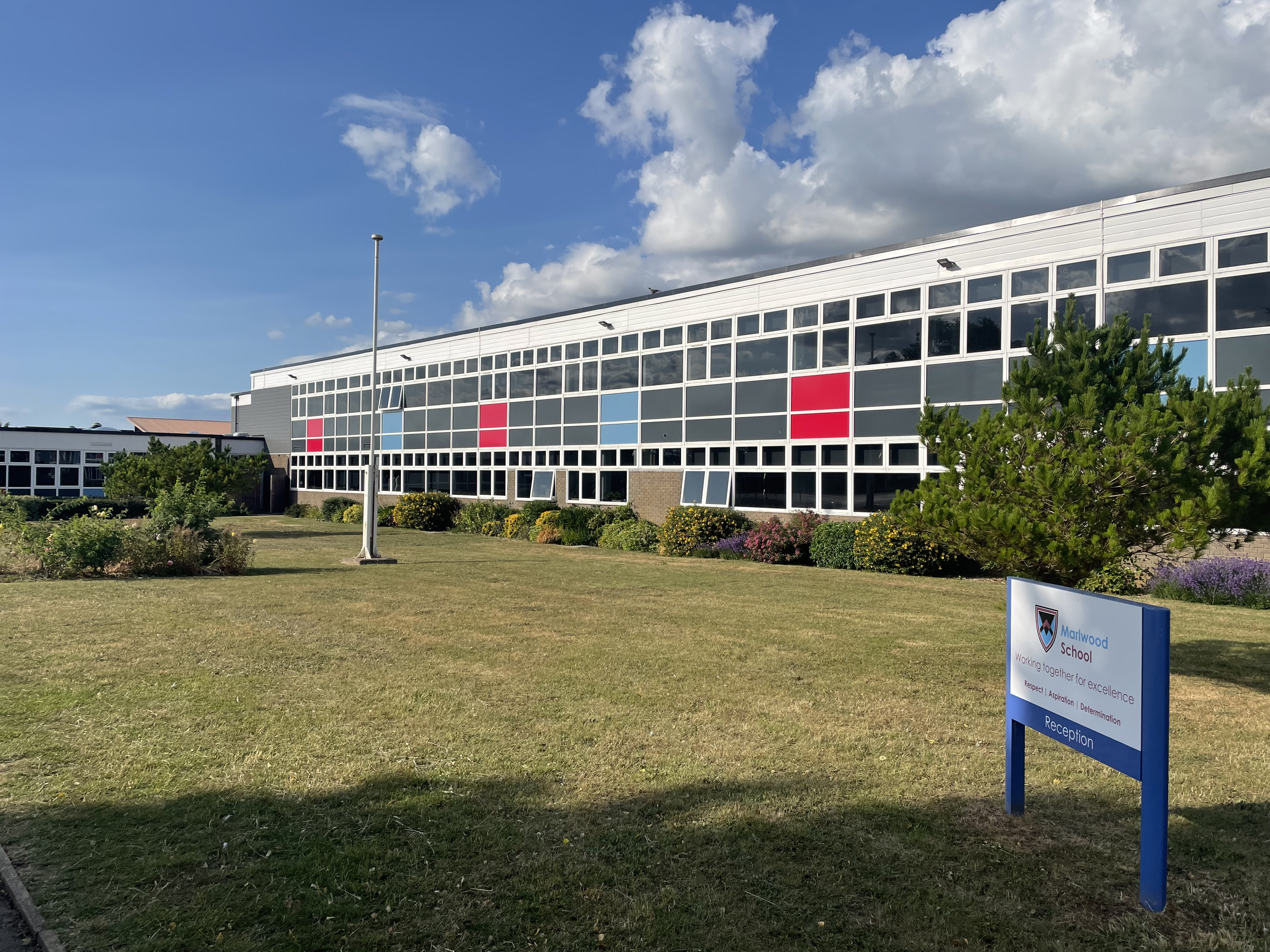

Location
- Vattingstone Lane; Alveston, Gloucestershire, BS35 3LA; England; 51.5931°N 2.5391°W

Information
- Type: Academy
- Motto: Working Together For Excellence (Originally Disce Aut Discede, Latin for "Learn or Leave")
- Established: 1606; 420 years ago (converted to academy in 2014)
- Trust: Pathway trust
- Department for Education URN: 141341 Tables
- Ofsted: Reports
- Headteacher: Helen Simmons
- Gender: Mixed
- Age: 11 to 16
- Enrollment: 550
- Capacity: 750
- Houses: Berkeley; Holt; Kingsley; Witton
- Colours: Bottle green and maroon (grey blazer); House Colours: Blue, Red, Yellow, Purple
- Former name: Thornbury Grammar School
- Website: marlwood.com

Marlwood School (founded 1606) is a state-funded co-educational secondary school currently part of the Pathway Trust. Located at Alveston, South Gloucestershire, it is situated on the B3561 on the outskirts of the south-west of the village.

Marlwood School has around 550 pupils aged 11–16.

In its most recent Ofsted inspection, Marlwood was rated ‘Good’ in all areas.

== House system ==
The modern-day school operates a house system, whereby students are divided up into four houses, which are named after old English words for woodland and thus pick up the theme of ‘wood’ in Marlwood, the school site at one time being woodland belonging to the Marlwood estate. Houses are then broken down into tutor groups for each house per year. Each House is led by a member of staff and all staff members belong to a house:

House	Colour
Kingsley	Yellow
Holt	Red
Berkeley	Blue
Witton	Purple

The houses compete throughout the year in various sporting, academic and performing art competitions.

== History ==
=== Grammar school ===
The school was founded in 1606 as Thornbury Free School. In the following centuries, it was housed in a number of buildings throughout Thornbury. In 1879 the school merged with Attwell’s Free School to become Thornbury Grammar School, moving to buildings on Gloucester Road.

=== Comprehensive ===
Thornbury Grammar School was relocated to new buildings on the outskirts of neighbouring Alveston in 1972 where it received its first comprehensive intake and was renamed Marlwood School under the headship of Terry Fazey.

=== Academy ===
Marlwood School converted to academy status on 1 November 2014 and is now independent of local authority control. However, the school continues to coordinate with South Gloucestershire Council for admissions. The school is now part of the education trust Pathway Trust (Formerly Castle School Education Trust).

It was formerly a Beacon school and had attained the status of Science College, due to excellence at science.

Sixth form provision is shared with The Castle School and based in the old Thornbury Grammar School buildings.

== Notable alumni ==
- Tony Britton – Actor
- Sally Conway – Olympic medalist judoka
- Ellie Leather – British middle-distance runner
- Paul Nicholls – Champion National Hunt Trainer
- Miles Normandale – Rugby player
- Rhys Oakley – Welsh rugby player
- John Pullin – England rugby captain
- Wayne Thompson – Rugby player
- Gary Warren - Football player

== Media ==
Marlwood School featured in the BBC Two series, School in November 2018. The head explained the impossible nature of improving a school, with declining numbers, a then poor Ofsted judgement and annual cuts to an inadequate budget. He was filmed writing his resignation letter. This act was received favourably and with sympathy by fellow headteachers.

== See also ==
The Castle School
