= Rhys Oakley =

Wales international rugby union footballer

- Born: 16 September 1980 (age 46) Plymouth, England
- Height: 193 cm (6 ft 4 in)
- Weight: 106 kg (16 st 10 lb; 234 lb)
- School: Marlwood School

Rugby union career
- Position: Number eight
Youth career
- Thornbury RFC
Senior career
Years	Team	Apps	(Points)
2002–2003	Bristol Bears	5	(5)
2003–2006	Newport Gwent Dragons	33	(55)
2006–2011	Yorkshire Carnegie	136	(30)
2011–2012	CS Bourgoin	37	(0)
2012–2013	Northampton Saints	22	(0)
2013–2015	Plymouth Albion	82	(15)
2017–2019	Hartpury College R.F.C.	38	(0)
International career
Years	Team	Apps	(Points)
2003	Wales	2	(0)
National sevens team
Years	Team		Comps
2006	Wales		1

Rhys Oakley (born 16 September 1980 in Plymouth) is a former professional rugby union footballer who played as a number eight. Oakley began his professional career with Bristol Rugby, before moving to the Newport Gwent Dragons, Leeds Tykes, Northampton Saints, and CS Bourgoin-Jallieu. During the final years of his career, Oakley spent time as a player-coach for Plymouth Albion R.F.C. and Hartpury University R.F.C. Oakley is a Wales international and represented Wales Sevens at the 2006 Commonwealth Games.

== Club career ==
Oakley first played for Thornbury RFC, and attended Marlwood School where he played for the school's team. Oakley played for North Bristol RFC and Clifton RFC, before joining the Bristol U21 side, and ultimately gaining a first team contract.

Oakley played in the Premiership for Bristol Shoguns, where he made 19 starts for the club. He was named as man of the match on his second appearance, a Heineken Cup match against Clermont. Following Bristol's relegation from the top-flight in 2003, he joined Newport Gwent Dragons and made 50 appearances for Newport.

At the end of the 2005–06 season, Oakley and teammate Leigh Hinton were released by Newport Gwent Dragons, and joined Leeds Tykes on a two-year deal, for the start of the National Division One 2006–07 season, making his debut against London Welsh at Headingley on 3 September 2006.

Following Leeds' relegation at the end of the 2010–11 Premiership season, Oakley used a release clause to exit his contract with the club, and joined French club CS Bourgoin-Jallieu. Oakley spent one season with the side, before returning to the Premiership with Northampton Saints. Oakley played for the Saints for one season, and joined RFU Championship team Plymouth Albion R.F.C. as a player-coach in 2013. In 2015, Oakley suffered a leg fracture while playing for Plymouth, ending his season and coinciding with the club's relegation from the Championship.

Oakley departed Plymouth Albion in 2015, and joined Hartpury University R.F.C., again as a dual player-coach. While with Hartpury, Oakley was appointed as team captain, and helped the club gain promotion from National League One to the Championship. In 2018, Oakley was diagnosed with cancer, putting his playing career on hold. He successfully recovered, but retired from playing, remaining active as a coach.

== International career ==
Oakley attained two Welsh caps in August 2003, making his debut for Wales against Ireland in the World Cup warm-up games in the back row alongside former Tyke Richard Parks.

Oakley was selected for Wales Sevens for the 2006 Commonwealth Games in Melbourne, following an injury to Dragons teammate Jamie Ringer. Oakley scoring a try in the plate final, helping the team to a 28–24 victory.

== Coaching career ==
Oakley's first coaching role came as a player-coach with Plymouth Albion, working as their forwards coach. After departing Plymouth, Oakley worked as head coach at Lydney RFC while playing for Hartpury, before leaving the role to focus fully on Hartpury, becoming their defence coach in 2017. Oakley rejoined Lydney in 2022, once again serving as head coach.

== Personal life ==
Oakley's parents were born in Wales, and moved to Plymouth for work, where he was born. Oakley moved to Bristol at age four, and attended Marlwood School. In 2018, while playing for Hartpury, Oakley was diagnosed with cancer. After undergoing chemotherapy and surgery, Oakley successfully recovered in 2019.
