= Thornbury Town Hall =

Municipal building in Thornbury, Gloucestershire, England

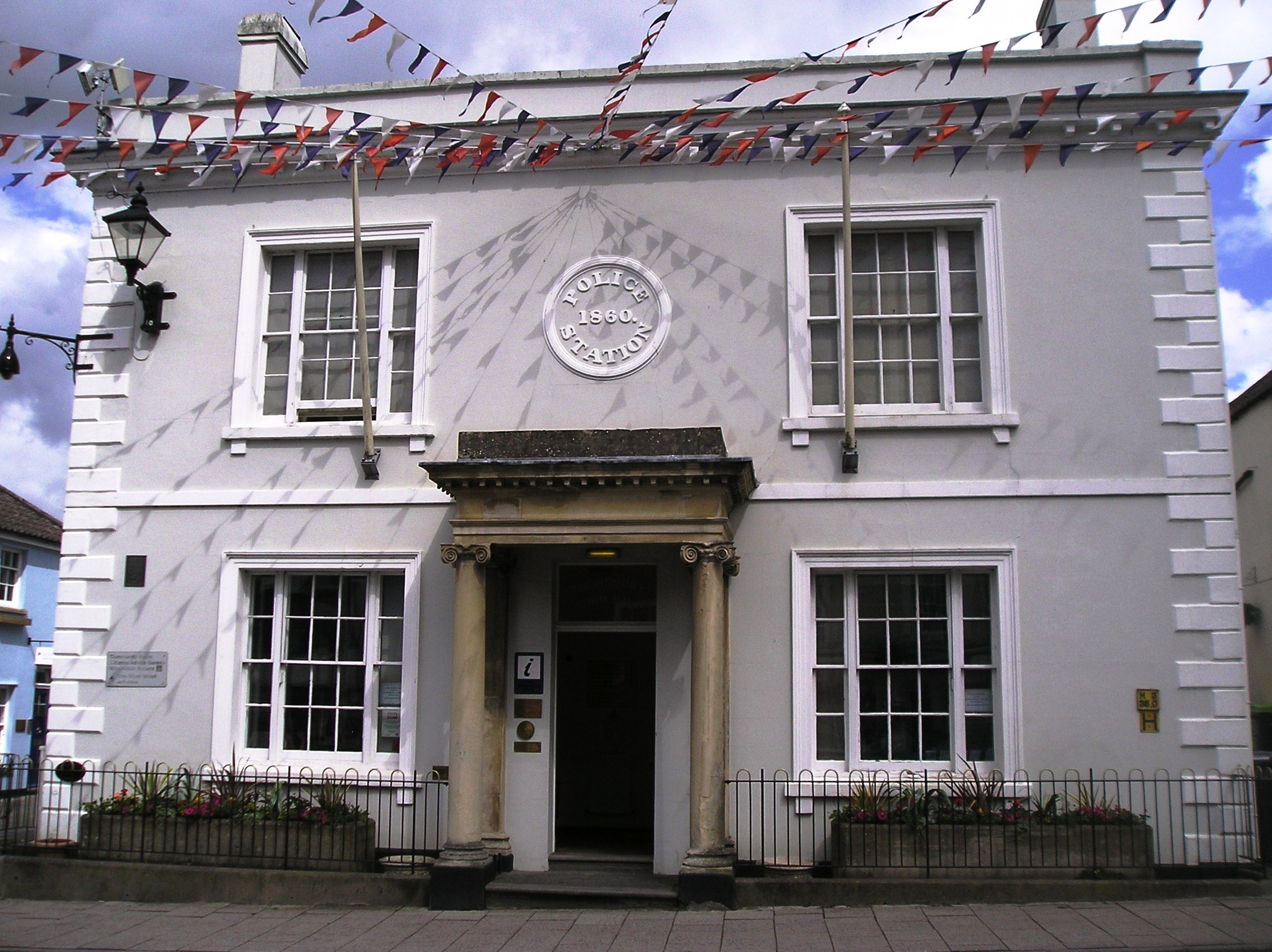
- Thornbury Town Hall

- Shown in Gloucestershire
- 51.6077°N 2.5259°W
- Location: High Street, Thornbury

History
- Built: 1785

Site notes
- Architectural style: Neoclassical style

Listed Building – Grade II
- Official name: Magistrates Court
- Designated: 4 September 1973
- Reference no.: 1128795

Thornbury Town Hall, is a municipal building in the High Street, Thornbury, Gloucestershire, England. The building, which is the meeting place of Thornbury Town Council, is a Grade II listed building.

== History ==
The first building on the site on the east side of the High Street between Silver Street and Soapers Lane was a public house known as the "Wine Tavern" which dated back at least to 1590. It was acquired by an apothecary, John Gayner, who converted it for his own use in 1737. The site was then acquired by an attorney, George Rolph, who decided to demolish the original building and commission the current structure.

The new building was designed in the neoclassical style, built in brick with a stucco finish and was completed in 1785. The design involved a symmetrical main frontage with three bays facing onto the High Street; the central bay featured a portico with Ionic order columns supporting an entablature. The outer bays were fenestrated by tri-partite sash windows and, at roof level, there was a modillioned cornice and a parapet. Internally, the principal room was a large drawing room at the front of the building on the first floor. Following George Rolph's death in 1815, the house passed to his son, William, who enlarged the property by incorporating two other properties at the rear.

Following William Rolph's death in 1848, the building was auctioned and acquired by the local justices of the peace. They commissioned a local contractor, Daniel Burchell, to convert the building into a police station and courthouse. Accommodation for the police sergeant and constables was created at the rear of the building. The drawing room was converted into a courtroom, which opened in time for the quarter sessions in March 1860. A large circular plaster cast recording the new use of the building and the date of the conversion was installed on the front of the building at first floor level. The borough council, which had ceased to discharge the usual functions of a corporation, was abolished under the Municipal Corporations Act 1883.

Thornbury Rural District Council, which was established in 1894, was not involved in the operation of the courthouse and instead established itself in council offices in Castle Street. The building in the High Street continued to operate as a police station until 1973, when a new police station opened in Rock Street, and continued to host magistrates court hearings until 1986, when the magistrates moved to a modern courthouse in Yate. The building then remained empty and deteriorating until it was acquired by Thornbury Town Council in April 1992. Restoration works, which involved the conversion of the courtroom into a council chamber, were completed in 1994. The old custody cells in the police station were restored for use as a visitor attraction and a tourist information centre was established on the ground floor of the building.
