= Thornbury Hoard =

Roman coins found in Gloucestershire, England

Coordinates: 51.6094°N 2.5249°W

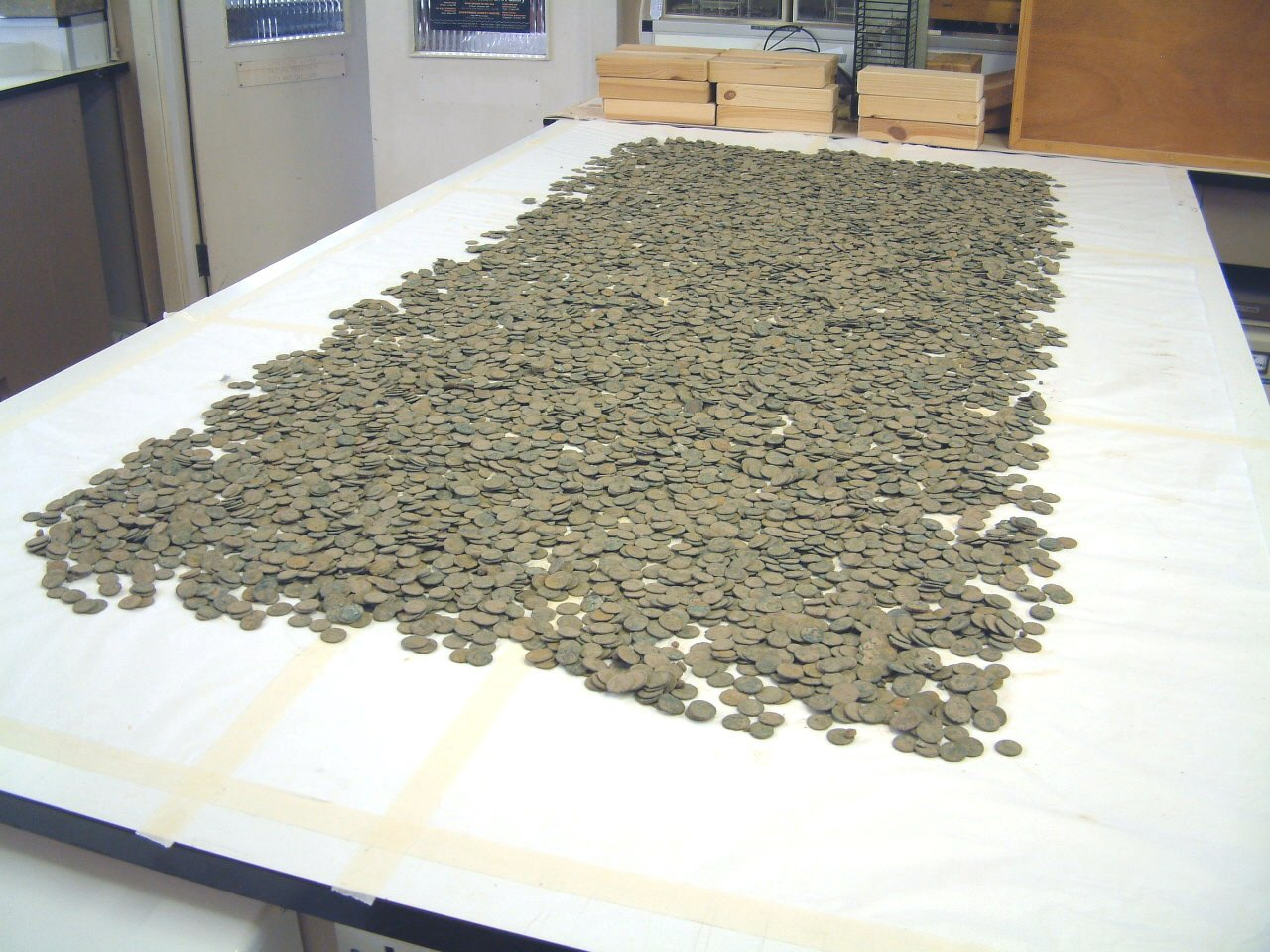
- Coins from the hoard, photographed in 2007
- Material: Silver, pottery
- Size: 11,460 coins
- Period/culture: Romano-British
- Discovered: Thornbury, South Gloucestershire by Ken Allen in March, 2004
- Present location: Bristol City Museum and Art Gallery, Bristol
- Identification: 2004 T147 (Fig 450)

The Thornbury Hoard is a hoard of 11,460 copper alloy Roman coins, mainly radiates and nummi, dating from 260 to 348, found in the back garden of Ken Allen in Thornbury, South Gloucestershire, England while digging a pond in March 2004. It was described as the "third largest of its kind" found in Great Britain.

== Discovery, treatment and valuation ==
The hoard was discovered by Ken Allen while digging a pond in his back garden. The coins were in a coarse grey ware decorated pot measuring 40–50 cm (16–20 in) high—thought to have originated in Caldicot, Monmouthshire—which had been damaged in the ground.

Allen reported the find and took it to Bristol City Museum and Art Gallery where it was weighed in at 28.6 kg (63 lb), and "took two people to lift the bucket it had been collected in". For the most part, the coins were readily identified after drying and chemical treatment.

At an inquest, the Coroner declared the hoard Treasure and a valuation committee subsequently valued it at £40,000. Bristol City Museum and Art Gallery acquired the hoard, funded by the Heritage Lottery Fund, the Headley Museums Treasure Acquisition Scheme, and other organisational funding.

== Items discovered ==
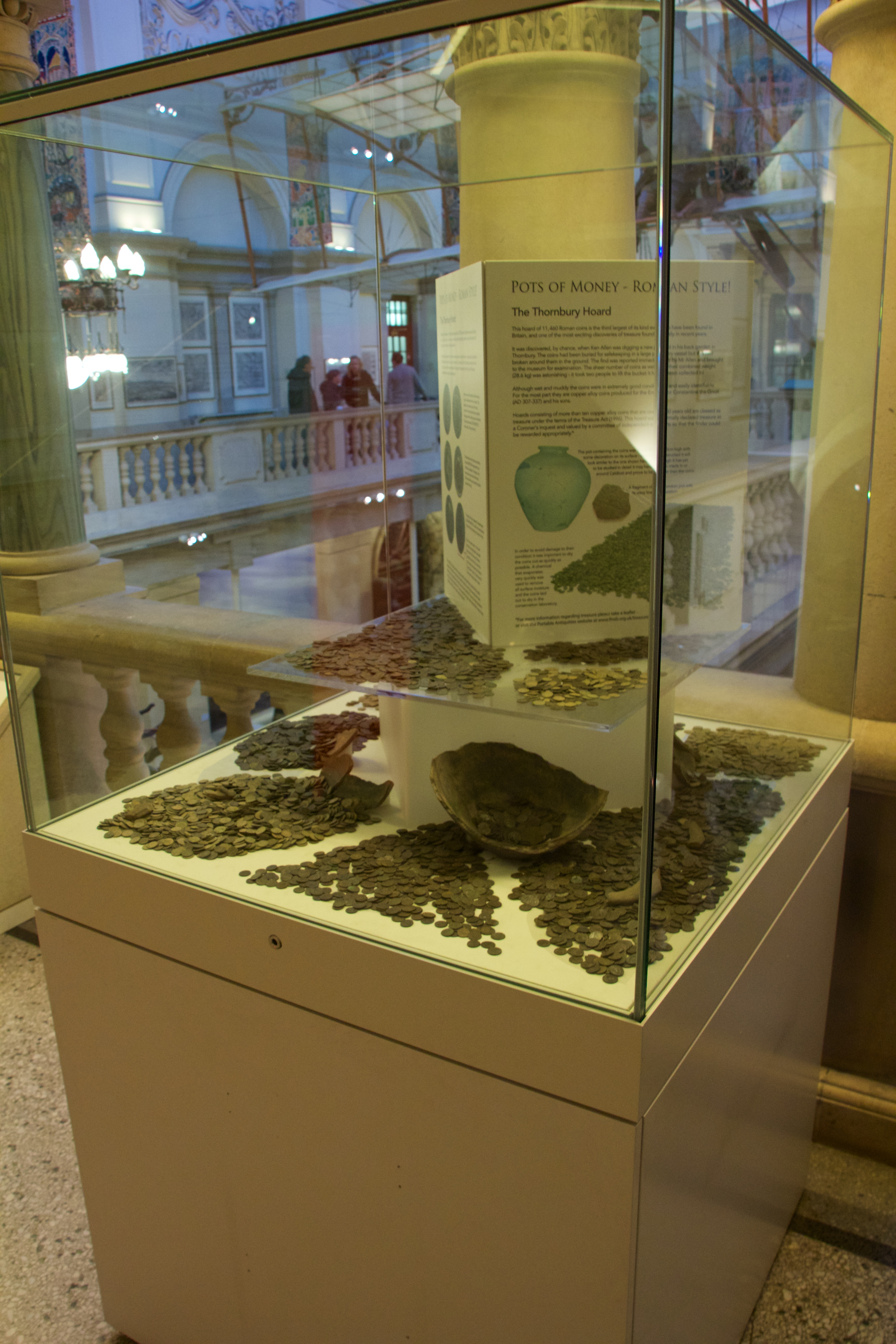
The Hoard on display at the Bristol City Museum and Art Gallery.

The hoard was said to be the "third largest of its kind" and consisted of 11,449 copper alloy nummi and 11 copper alloy radiates, the earliest dating from during the reign of Gallienus in 260; the latest being struck in 348, during the Constantinian dynasty. However, the vast majority were minted in the 330s and consisted of three reverse types showing "Gloria Exercitus", meaning "to the glory of the army" – either carrying a reverse design of "two soldiers with legionary standards" or commemorative types depicting the Roman Empire capitals of Rome and Constantinople. Others commemorated the battle of Chrysopolis fought between Constantine I and Licinius: these coins depict Victory standing on the prow of a ship.

The find was compared in size and constitution to those of the Nether Compton (22,670 coins) and Bishopswood (17,548 coins) hoards, found in 1989 and 1895 respectively.

Reign	Date range	No. of coins	Type	Notes
Gallienus	260–268	2	radiate	
Claudius II	268–270	1	radiate	
Tetricus I/II	271–274	6	radiate	
Carausius	287–293	1	radiate	
–	–	1	barbarous radiate	
Constantine I	313–317	13	nummi	inc 2 nummus fractions
Constantine II	318–330	59	nummi	
Constantinian	330–335	11,232	nummi	Gloria Exercitus (2 commemorative standards)
Constantinian	335–340	87	nummi	Gloria Exercitus (legionary standard)
Constantinian	341–348	2	nummi	Two Victories
–	–	49	barbarous nummi	
–	–	7	uncertain	illegible

== See also ==
- List of hoards in Britain
