= New Panteg RFC =

Welsh rugby union club, based in Pontypool

(Wales) New Panteg RFC
- Full name: New Panteg Rugby Football Club
- Founded: 1874; 152 years ago
- Location: New Inn, Torfaen
- Ground(s): Polo Grounds, New Inn
- Chairman: Iain Bevan
- Coach(es): Gareth Davies, Kevin Jones, Tom Lampard, Gareth Roberts
- Captain: Dan Scott
- League: WRU League Division 3 East
Team kit

Official website
- www.newpantegrfc.co.uk

New Panteg Rugby Football Club is a rugby union team from the village of New Inn, in Pontypool, Wales. The club is a member of the Welsh Rugby Union and is a feeder club for the Newport Gwent Dragons.

== Notable former players ==
- Taulupe Faletau (109 test caps for Wales, 4 for the British & Irish Lions)
- Mako Vunipola (67 test caps for England, 7 for the British & Irish Lions)
- Billy Vunipola (60 test caps for England)
