= Manu Vunipola (rugby union, born 2000) =

NZ rugby union player

- Born: Christian Fainga Manu Mapu' Aho Ta Aki-M Vunipola; 4 May 2000 (age 26) Auckland, New Zealand
- Height: 1.80 m (5 ft 11 in)
- Weight: 92 kg (14 st 7 lb; 203 lb)
- School: Harrow School

Rugby union career
- Position(s): Fly-half, Centre
- Current team: Secom Rugguts
Senior career
Years	Team	Apps	(Points)
2018–2024	Saracens	52	(230)
2024–2026	Honda Heat	15	(84)
2026–	Secom Rugguts		
- Correct as of 14 February 2026
International career
Years	Team	Apps	(Points)
2018	England U18	4	(0)
2019–2020	England U20	9	(39)
2026–	Tonga	1	(0)
- Correct as of 6 November 2026

Manu Vunipola (born 4 May 2000) is a rugby union player who plays as a fly-half for Secom Rugguts in Japan. Born in New Zealand, he represents Tonga at international level.

== Personal life ==
Vunipola was born in Auckland, New Zealand, and grew up in Somerset, England. He is the son of former Tongan international Elisi Vunipola, and the cousin of former Saracens teammates Billy and Mako Vunipola. He attended The King Alfred School, Highbridge. As a junior, he played for Burnham RFC, and captained the Harrow School rugby team.

== Club career ==
In 2017, Vunipola played for Saracens under-18s in the Aviva Premiership under-18s finals day. He then played for Saracens Storm, the A team of Saracens, and also played on loan for Bishop's Stortford. Vunipola made his Saracens senior debut in January 2019, in a 2018–19 Premiership Rugby Cup match against Harlequins. He made his Premiership Rugby debut in a 2018–19 match against Exeter Chiefs, and later made his first Premiership Rugby start in a match against Worcester Warriors.

In September 2019, Vunipola scored his first try for Saracens in a 2019–20 Premiership Rugby Cup match against Wasps. In January 2020, Vunipola scored 17 points in a 2019–20 European Rugby Champions Cup pool stage match, as Saracens beat Ospreys 22–15. In the same month, referee Luke Pearce appointed Vunipola as Saracens captain, after Pearce decided he did not want to speak with Jackson Wray during a match against Harlequins. In a February 2020 Premiership Rugby match against Sale Sharks, Vunipola scored 17 points and won a man of the match award. He re-signed with Saracens until at least the 2022–23 season.

On 28 January 2024, it was confirmed that Vunipola left Saracens to move to Japan to sign for Mie Honda Heat in their domestic League One competition from the 2024–25 season.

== International career ==
=== England youth ===
In 2018, Vunipola was called up to the England under-18s team. In total, he made four appearances for the team. Vunipola made his first start for England under-20s in their final match of the 2019 Six Nations Under 20s Championship against Scotland under-20s. He had made two previous substitute appearances in the tournament. Later that year he was a member of the squad that finished fifth at the 2019 World Rugby Under 20 Championship in Argentina.

Vunipola was selected by England for the 2020 Six Nations Under 20s Championship. He played in the Six Nations match against France under-20s in Grenoble, but missed the match against Ireland under-20s after returning to Tonga for personal reasons. Ultimately he made nine appearances for England under-20s.

=== Tonga ===
Vunipola qualifies to represent Tonga through ancestry and on 6 November 2026 made his debut in a victory over Romania during the 2026 World Rugby Nations Cup.
