= Trealaw =

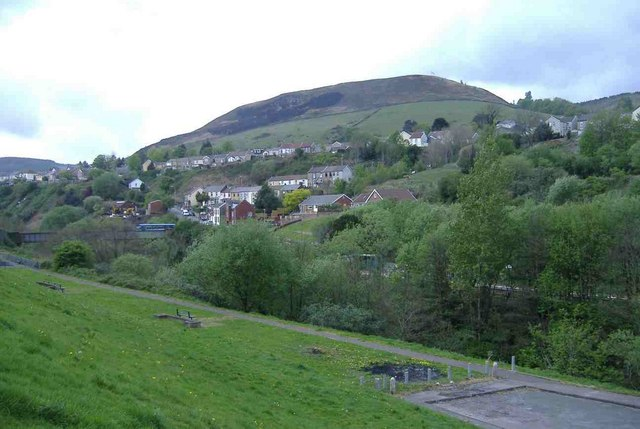

- Location within Rhondda Cynon Taf
- Population: 4,040 (2011)
- OS grid reference: SS996926
- Principal area: Rhondda Cynon Taf
- Preserved county: Mid Glamorgan
- Country: Wales
- Sovereign state: United Kingdom
- Post town: TONYPANDY
- Postcode district: CF40
- Dialling code: 01443
- Police: South Wales
- Fire: South Wales
- Ambulance: Welsh
- UK Parliament: Rhondda
- Senedd Cymru – Welsh Parliament: Rhondda
- List of places UK Wales Rhondda Cynon Taf 51.623600°N 3.451086°W Community map: Map of the community

Trealaw is a long village, also a community and electoral ward in the Rhondda Valley, Rhondda Cynon Taf, Wales. It stretches over two miles (three kilometres) from the junction of Cemetery Road and Brithweunydd Road in the east, to the junction of Ynyscynon Road and Partridge Road to the northwest.

== History ==
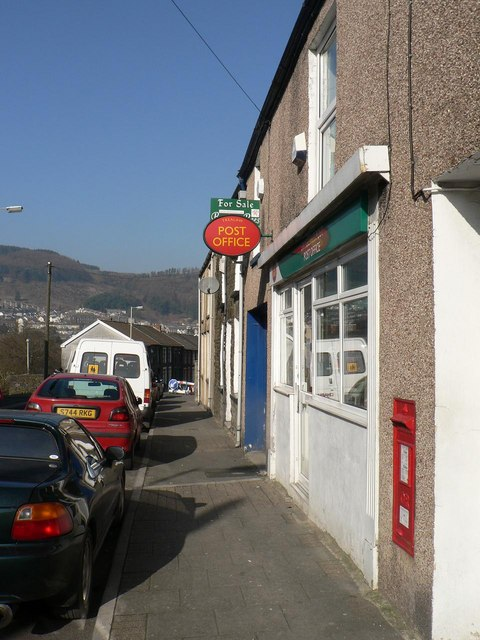
Trealaw Post Office

Trealaw is a dormitory town of the more famous Tonypandy, its name translates from the Welsh language as 'the Town of Alaw', which derives from Alaw Goch or Alaw Coch (red melody), the bardic name of David (Dafydd) Williams (d. 1863) the father of Judge Gwilym Williams (1839–1906), who founded the village (along with that of Williamstown, a village to the south of Trealaw) during the 'coal-rush' of the 19th century. Judge Williams is also commemorated in Trealaw by Judges Hall (in full, the Judge Gwilym Williams Memorial Hall) and in Ynyscynon Road, named after the Williams' family seat at Ynyscynon, near Aberdare in the Cynon Valley. Judges Hall is a community venue used in its heyday for Variety performances, boxing tournaments and snooker. Today it is used for Bingo and youth activities.

Although Trealaw is considered to date from the 1860/70s, it does have an earlier history. On the river bank, near the confluence of Nant Clydach with the Rhondda Fawr River, stood Ynys-y-Crug, a 12th-century timber motte-and-bailey castle. Until recent years, a mound about 12 feet high by 100 feet in length remained, which over the centuries had acquired the name of Gibbet Hill, indicating perhaps, that in the area's medieval period, it was a place of execution. However, latterly, development of the mid-Rhondda by-pass road has removed all traces of the castle.

Trealaw Cemetery

Trealaw is the site of one of the Rhondda's largest cemeteries, located at Llethrddu ("black slope"). Opened in 1875, it also contains war graves of both world wars. The burials of the First World War are scattered in various parts of this large cemetery, and shortly after that war a Cross of Sacrifice was erected at the cemetery entrance. The cemetery contains the graves of Lord Tonypandy, Tommy Farr, Lewis Jones and James Kitchener Davies. William Evans (1864–1934), owner of Thomas & Evans Ltd which produced the soft drink Corona, is also buried here. The cemetery features many reminders of the tragic loss of life which was an everyday reality during the valley's coal mining era, including most of the thirty-one victims of the Rhondda's last mining disaster at the Cambrian Colliery in May 1965.

== Governance ==
The Trealaw electoral ward is coterminous with the borders of the Trealaw community and elects one county councillor to Rhondda Cynon Taf County Borough Council. Since 1995 representation has mainly flipped between the Labour Party and Plaid Cymru. At the May 2012 election and May 2017 election it was won by Labour's Joy Rosser. At the May 2022 election the seat was won by Labour's Wyn Hughes, whose son Gareth Hughes was councillor for neighbouring Tonypandy.

== Transport ==
Trealaw is served by two railway stations on the Transport for Wales train services from Cardiff: Dinas and Tonypandy. Dinas (then known as Pandy station, located 100 metres downline from the present station) was the original terminus of the Rhondda Fawr branch, opened by the Taff Vale Railway, until it was extended to Treherbert in 1863.

The village is served by Stagecoach bus route 120 between Blaenrhondda and Pontypridd/Caerphilly; and Veolia Transport Route 175 between Clydach Vale/Tonypandy and Porth.

== Commerce and industry ==
Trealaw has never had very much by way of commerce and industry. At the lower end, there was Davies's soft drinks factory in Marjorie Street, while in Trealaw Road the Co-op and the Hopkin Morgan bakeries provided the main employment. All the former have ceased trading, the latter two now the site of modern housing developments. Between the railway and the river, near Trealaw Station, is Foundry Road, which has a number of industrial units.

== Education ==
There are two primary schools, Alaw Primary School and Trealaw Junior School. The Secondary modern school for senior pupils closed with the introduction of Comprehensive school education in the 1970s, and it burned down soon after. Children who live near the Tonypandy end of the village are more likely to attend Tonypandy Community College; and children who live near Porth are more likely to attend Porth County Community School.

== Recreation ==
For recreation, the main venue is Maes-yr-Haf Education Centre, founded by the Society of Friends (Quakers) in the 1920s where everything from pottery to drama was taught. Today, there is a more limited range of activities, while the Dan Murphy Day Centre (named after a former councillor) on the site provides meals and a meeting place for the area's senior citizens.

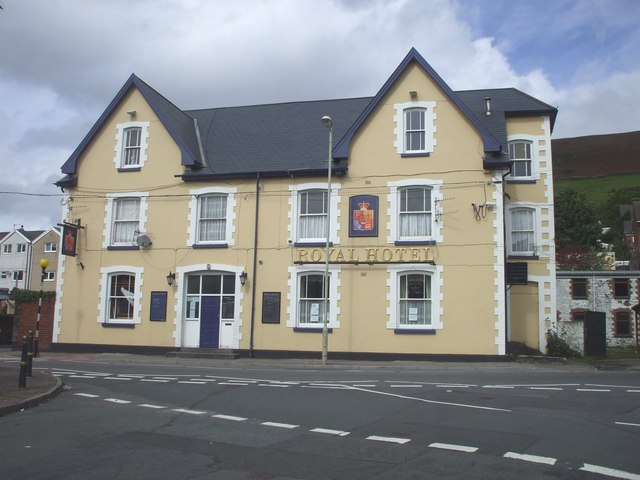
Royal Hotel, Trealaw

Originally, the village had seven pubs (The Bute Hotel, Dinas Arms, Royal Hotel, Miskin Hotel, Trealaw Hotel (known locally as Paddy's Goose), Colliers Arms and the Ynyscynon Hotel), but the Bute and the Dinas Arms did not survive beyond the 1960s. The Bute was located directly opposite the main entrance to Llethrddu Cemetery, and acquired the nickname of The Resurrection because, in the days of walking funerals, the mourners would repair to the Bute to 'resurrect' the deceased with tales and reminiscences over a pint or three. The Bute closed in 1964 and was subsequently demolished to provide a car parking area for the Trealaw Workingmen's Club next door which has now acquired the 'Res' soubriquet. One of many such clubs in the South Wales Valleys, the club was paid for from contributions deducted from pit workers' wages to provide social and educational facilities for the employees. Many of these workingmen's clubs were known as the universities of the working class with their extensive libraries of mostly left-wing literature.

In the 19th and early-20th century, behind Dinas Arms was the Brithweunydd Hotel, a low-class lodging house for workers attracted to the area by the burgeoning coal mining industry.

The Royal Hotel shut its doors in early 2010 due to increased rates and the down turn in the economy.

== Notable people ==
See Category:People from Trealaw

- Catherine Glyn Davies (1926–2007), historian of philosophy and translator
- Gordon Mills (1935–1986), songwriter and music manager
- Ray Smith (1936–1991), actor, best known as Det-Supt Spikings in the series Dempsey and Makepeace
- Morgan Stoddart (born 1984), Welsh international rugby union player.
- Lord Tonypandy (1909–1997), (formerly George Thomas, the Speaker of the House of Commons)
