= Billy Vunipola =

English rugby union player (born 1992)

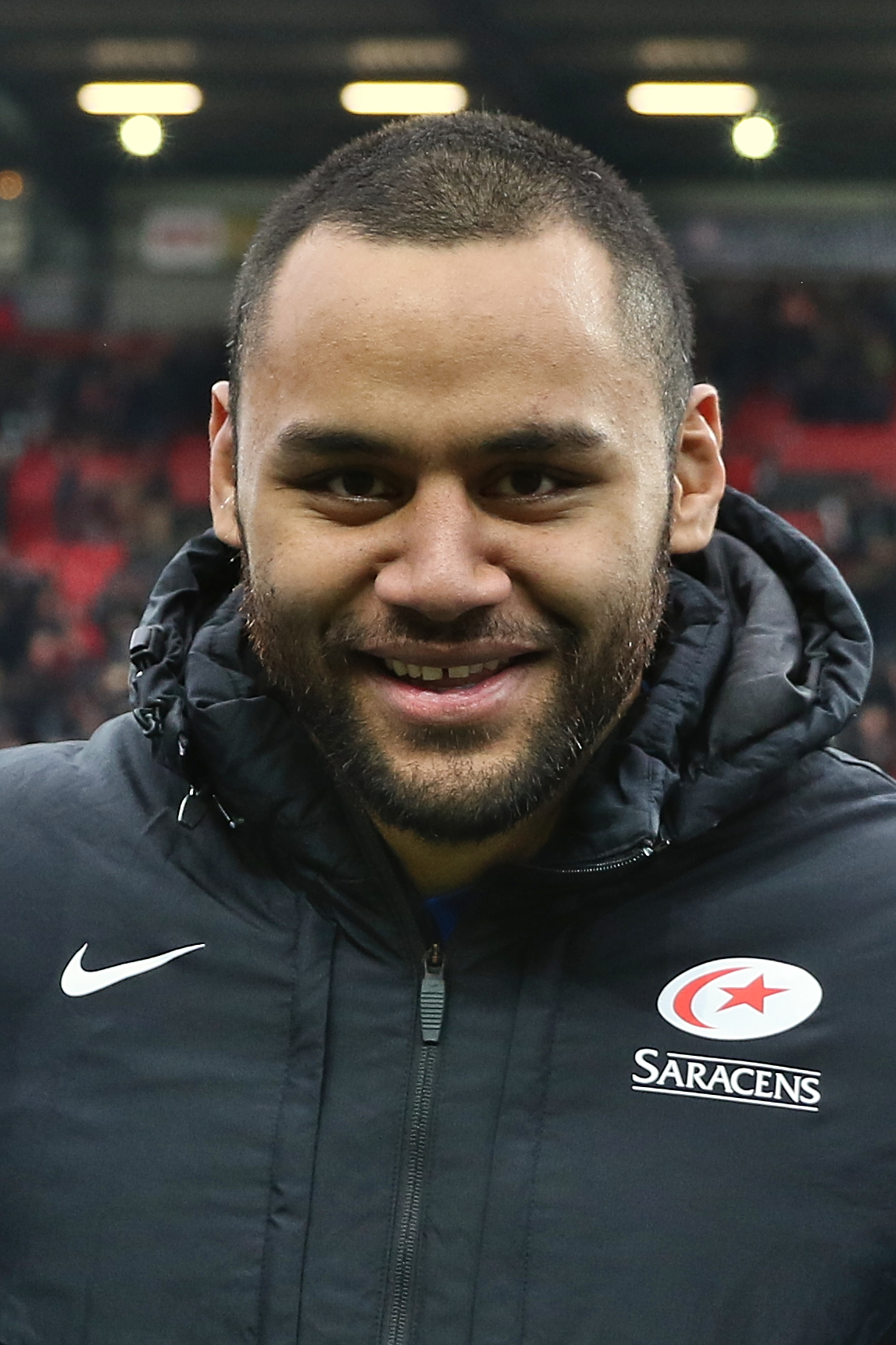
- Vunipola representing Saracens during the Aviva Premiership
- Full name: Viliami Vunipola
- Born: 3 November 1992 (age 34) Sydney, New South Wales, Australia
- Height: 1.88 m (6 ft 2 in)
- Weight: 126 kg (278 lb; 19 st 12 lb)
- School: The Castle School; Harrow School
- Notable relative(s): Feʻao Vunipola (father); Mako Vunipola (brother); Elisi Vunipola (uncle); Manu Vunipola (uncle); Manu Vunipola (cousin)

Rugby union career
- Position: Number 8
- Current team: Montpellier
Senior career
Years	Team	Apps	(Points)
2011–2013	Wasps	41	(20)
2013–2024	Saracens	178	(145)
2024–	Montpellier	22	(10)
- Correct as of 28 August 2023
International career
Years	Team	Apps	(Points)
2012	England U20	4	(5)
2013–2023	England	75	(45)
- Correct as of 28 August 2023
Medal record
Men's Rugby union
Representing England
Rugby World Cup
Silver medal – second place	2019 Japan	Squad
Bronze medal – third place	2023 France	Squad

Viliami Vunipola (born 3 November 1992) is a professional rugby union player who plays as a number eight for the Top 14 side Montpellier. Born in Australia, he represents England at international level after qualifying on residency grounds.

== Early life ==
Vunipola, was born in Sydney in Australia to Tongan parents, but moved to Wales with his family as a young child after his father Feʻao Vunipola signed for Pontypool RFC in 1998. He was educated at Porth Infants School and Griffithstown Junior School, playing for New Panteg RFC with Joeseph Lane. He subsequently moved to The Castle School in Thornbury, Gloucestershire, England where he played junior rugby for Thornbury RFC before being given a scholarship to attend Harrow School.

== Club career ==
=== Wasps ===
While at Harrow School, Vunipola joined the Wasps Academy. He made his senior team debut in 2011–12 season and played 30 matches over two seasons before leaving at the end of the 2012–2013 season.

=== Saracens ===
Vunipola signed a contract in January 2013 to move to Saracens at the end of the 2012–13 Premiership season. During his time at Saracens he has won four Premiership titles in 2015, 2016, 2018 and 2019, with Vunipola featuring in all four finals and scoring a try in the 2018 final against Exeter Chiefs. He also helped Saracens win the European Rugby Champions Cup three times in four seasons; beating Racing 92 in 2016 and the following year defeating ASM Clermont Auvergne at Murrayfield to retain their title. In the 2019 final Vunipola scored a try in the victory over Leinster at St James' Park.

After Saracens were relegated from the Premiership due to salary cap breaches, Vunipola scored two tries in the 2021 Championship play-off final as they overcame Ealing Trailfinders to gain promotion and an immediate return to the top flight.

=== Montpellier ===
On 22 March 2024, after 11 seasons at Saracens, Vunipola announced his departure from the club, along with his brother Mako Vunipola, as he had signed for Montpellier in the Top 14 competition from the 2024-25 season.

== International career ==
=== England ===
In 2010, Vunipola was vice-captain for the England under-18 team that toured South Africa. He was also a member of the England under-20 side that finished seventh at the 2012 IRB Junior World Championship. In January 2013, he was called up to the England Saxons and subsequently trained with the senior England Squad during the 2013 Six Nations Championship.

Vunipola was included in the squad for their 2013 tour of South America and on 8 June 2013, made his senior England debut in the opening Test against Argentina in Salta, coming off the bench to score a try in England's 32–3 win. Earlier in the trip, he played in a tour game against a Consur XV, and scored a hat-trick of tries in six minutes.

Vunipola scored tries against Italy and France during the 2015 Six Nations Championship as England finished runners up. He was selected for the 2015 Rugby World Cup and scored a try in the opening match of the tournament against Fiji. A knee injury sustained in the pool defeat against Wales ended his participation at the World Cup.

In January 2016, new head coach Eddie Jones included Vunipola in his squad for the 2016 Six Nations Championship and he started all the fixtures during the tournament as England achieved their first grand slam in over a decade. Later that year, he scored a try in the last game of their summer tour of Australia to complete a series whitewash. The following year saw Vunipola score a try against Scotland in the penultimate round of the 2017 Six Nations Championship and he then started in the last match of the tournament loss away to Ireland which ensured England failed to complete consecutive grand slams and also brought an end to a record equalling eighteen successive Test victories.

Vunipola was chosen for the 2019 Rugby World Cup and scored a try in a warm-up match against Wales. He subsequently scored a try in the pool game against the United States and won his 50th cap in the semi-final victory over New Zealand. He then started in the 2019 Rugby World Cup Final defeat against South Africa.

After the World Cup, Vunipola was a member of the side that won the 2020 Six Nations Championship and later that year, started for the England side that defeated France during extra-time of the Autumn Nations Cup final.

=== British & Irish Lions ===
In April 2017, Vunipola was selected as one of the 41 British & Irish Lions to tour New Zealand in the summer alongside his brother Mako Vunipola. However, due to an ongoing shoulder injury, he withdrew from the squad on 21 May 2017 and was replaced by England back-row teammate James Haskell. Vunipola was not selected by coach Warren Gatland for the 2021 tour.

== Personal life ==
Vunipola's father is former Tonga captain Fe'ao Vunipola and his mother, Iesinga Vunipola, a Methodist minister in High Wycombe. He is the nephew of two other former international players, Manu and 'Elisi Vunipola, who both represented Tonga in the 1990s. His brother, Mako Vunipola was his teammate with Saracens and England.

Vunipola was arrested and fined by Spanish police following a dispute in a Mallorca nightclub in April 2024.

== Career statistics ==
=== List of international tries ===
As of 9 July 2022

Try	Opposing team	Location	Venue	Competition	Date	Result	Score
1	Argentina	Salta, Argentina	Estadio Padre Ernesto Martearena	2013 Tour of Argentina	8 June 2013	Win	32 – 3
2	Italy	London, England	Twickenham Stadium	2015 Six Nations	14 February 2015	Win	47 – 17
3	France	London, England	Twickenham Stadium	2015 Six Nations	25 March 2015	Win	55 – 35
4	Fiji	London, England	Twickenham Stadium	2015 Rugby World Cup	18 September 2015	Win	35 – 11
5	Australia	Sydney, Australia	Sydney Football Stadium	2016 Tour of Australia	25 June 2016	Win	44 – 40
6	Scotland	London, England	Twickenham Stadium	2017 Six Nations	11 March 2017	Win	61 – 21
7	Wales	London, England	Twickenham Stadium	2019 Rugby World Cup warm-up match	11 August 2019	Win	33 – 19
8	United States	Kobe, Japan	Kobe Misaki Stadium	2019 Rugby World Cup	26 September 2019	Win	45 – 7
9	Australia	Brisbane, Australia	Suncorp Stadium	2022 England tour of Australia	9 July 2022	Win	17 – 25

== Honours ==
England

- 3× Six Nations Championship: 2016, 2017, 2020
- 1× Autumn Nations Cup: 2020
- 1× Rugby World Cup runner-up: 2019
- 1x Rugby World Cup - 3rd Place - 2023

Saracens

- 3× European Rugby Champions Cup: 2016, 2017, 2019
- 4× Premiership: 2015, 2016, 2018, 2019
- 1× RFU Championship: 2021

=== Individual ===
IRB Player of the Year - Nominee - 2016
