= Feʻao Vunipola =

Tonga international rugby union player

Fe'ao Vunipola
- Born: Fe'ao Moe Laru Vunipola; 6 January 1969 (age 57)
- Height: 5 ft 9 in (1.75 m)
- Weight: 234 lb (16 st 10 lb; 106 kg)
- Notable relative(s): Elisi Vunipola (brother); Manu Vunipola (brother); Mako Vunipola (son); Billy Vunipola (son)
- Occupation: Architect

Rugby union career
- Position: Hooker
Senior career
Years	Team	Apps	(Points)
1988-1998	Toa-ko-Ma'afu RFC		
1998–1999	Pontypool	24	(55)
1999–2001	Pontypridd	44	
2001–2003	Caerphilly	8	(5)
Provincial / State sides
Years	Team	Apps	(Points)
1988-1998	Tongatapu		
International career
Years	Team	Apps	(Points)
1988–2001	Tonga	34	(15)

Fe'ao Moe Lotu Vunipola (born 6 January 1969) is a Tongan former international rugby union player who participated at the 1995 Rugby World Cup and 1999 Rugby World Cup. He is the father of Mako Vunipola and Billy Vunipola, and is married to Rev. Iesinga Vunipola, Methodist minister and chaplain to the UK Tongan community. He moved to Wales in 1998 to sign with Pontypool, and in 1999 joined up with Pontypridd. He left to join neighbours Caerphilly in 2001.
