= Porth Community School =

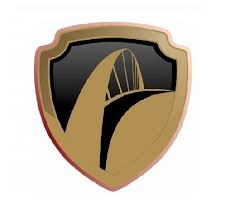

Location
- Cemetery Road, Porth; Porth, Rhondda Cynon Taf, Wales; United Kingdom; 51.605°N 3.415°W

Information
- Type: Community School
- Motto: Aspire together, achieve together
- Established: 2018 (as Porth Community School)
- Head teacher: Laura Dober
- Years offered: Nursery - 11
- Enrollment: 900
- Colours: Grey, White and Purple (years 1-11)
- Nickname: Porth, PCS
- National ranking: 15 out of 212 secondary schools in Wales (as of 2014)
- Previous Head Teachers: Yvonne Jones (2018-2024); Richard Jenkins (2016-2018); Anita Francis (2011–2016); Steve Bowden (1996–2011); Vernon Owen Jones (Initially as Porth County Grammar School for Boys from 1961 to 1984); Richard Chalke (as Porth Higher Elementary School from 1914–????); John Gradling Grant (as Porth Higher Elementary School from 1905 to 1914)
- Website: porthcommunityschool.co.uk

Porth Community School is a Community School located in the county borough of Rhondda Cynon Taf, Wales. The school was formed in 1973 by the amalgamation of two leading grammar schools, Porth County Girls and Porth County Boys, along with the amalgamation of the Secondary Modern Schools of Llwyncelyn, Trealaw and Ynyshir. Children of various ages attend the school, ranging from 3–16 years old.

== History ==
Historical painting of 'Porth Higher Elementary School' by an unknown artist. Circa. 1905

The origins of the school dates back to the creation of ‘Porth Higher Elementary School’ in 1904, it opened the following January. The school enrolled 240 pupils under headmaster John Stradling Grant. At the time the vast majority of children in the Rhondda were born into poverty. There was a great deal of controversy over providing further education in the Rhondda. Tom John (editor of the ‘Rhondda Leader’ and the first Welshman to become president of the ‘National Union of Teachers’) said that "there was a laborious effort made by several speakers at the meeting [the opening ceremony] to dissipate the fear that this splendid institution would work serious opposition and injury to the county school nearby". The school was built to cater for pupils between the ages of ten and fifteen years-old, but there were many problems from the start. From as late as 1915, school inspectors found students aged nineteen to still be attending the institution.

After the death of headmaster John Stradling Grant in 1914, Richard Chalke took over as head of the school. At the same time the school was merged with the ‘Pupil Teachers College’, where once a week students would take turns in teaching their peers. This was done by pupils to gain entrance into teacher training colleges and become teachers themselves.

In 1922 the school became officially recognised as a secondary school. Then between 1946 and 1947, the name of the school was changed to ‘Porth Secondary Grammar School’. Sometime between 1951 and 1954 the name of the school was changed again to ‘Porth County Grammar Mixed School’. At some point in time the grammar school was split in two sections, one half being known as ‘Porth County Girls’ and the other half being known as ‘Porth County Boys’.

In 1961, Vernon Owen Jones became headmaster of Porth County Grammar School for Boys. Jones was headmaster from 1961 to 1984, and saw the amalgamation of the 'Porth County Girls' and 'Porth County Boys' grammar schools (along with the Secondary Modern Schools of Llwyncelyn, Trealaw and Ynyshir) into what is now known as 'Porth County Community School'. He retired from the school in 1984, and after retiring, he wrote a number of books about Porth, including one about his experiences as headmaster at 'Porth County'.

During 2003, after six to seven weeks of preparation, a demolition team reduced parts of the 'upper school' to a pile of rubble during the weekend of 31 May to 1 June 2003, with site clearance taking place within the subsequent weeks following the demolition.

In November 2003, The Guardian reported that staff at 'Porth County Community School' had "caught young teenagers" using steroids at the school and had found steroids on school premises.

On 18 May 2009 Welsh actor Michael Sheen spoke with members of the school's film club. Porth County Community School is part of 'Filmclub' along with schools in the Tonypandy and Treorchy areas, and it is implemented through the schools "E3 after-school projects". During his visit, Michael Sheen spoke with the pupils and told them that he was "saddened" by the lack of funding for drama schools and clubs throughout Wales.

=== New School ===
At the start of 2016, Rhondda Cynon Taff council released a statement saying that they will be spending £80 million on making a 'super school' This would be for Porth county community school and Tonypandy community college. The process of making started in 2017 and was estimated to be finished by 2018. It was eventually finished and opened to the public on 1 September 2018.

== Notable former pupils ==
- Chris Evans – British politician and member of parliament for Islwyn, grew up in Wattstown and attended Porth County Community School
- Mako Vunipola – New Zealand born rugby union player
- Andrew King – professor of English literature
- Keiron Assiratti - Cardiff Blues and Wales Rugby Union player

== Possible school closure ==
During 2015 plans were introduced that suggested eleven schools in the surrounding areas including 'Porth County Community School' could face closure. The Rhondda Cynon Taff council has said that the school closures would be part of their proposed £75 million investment, which they say would provide "improved educational facilities" and "opportunities" for nearly 7,000 children.
