= Thornbury, Gloucestershire =

Market town in Gloucestershire, England

Coordinates: 51°36′34″N 2°31′30″W

Thornbury
- Market town
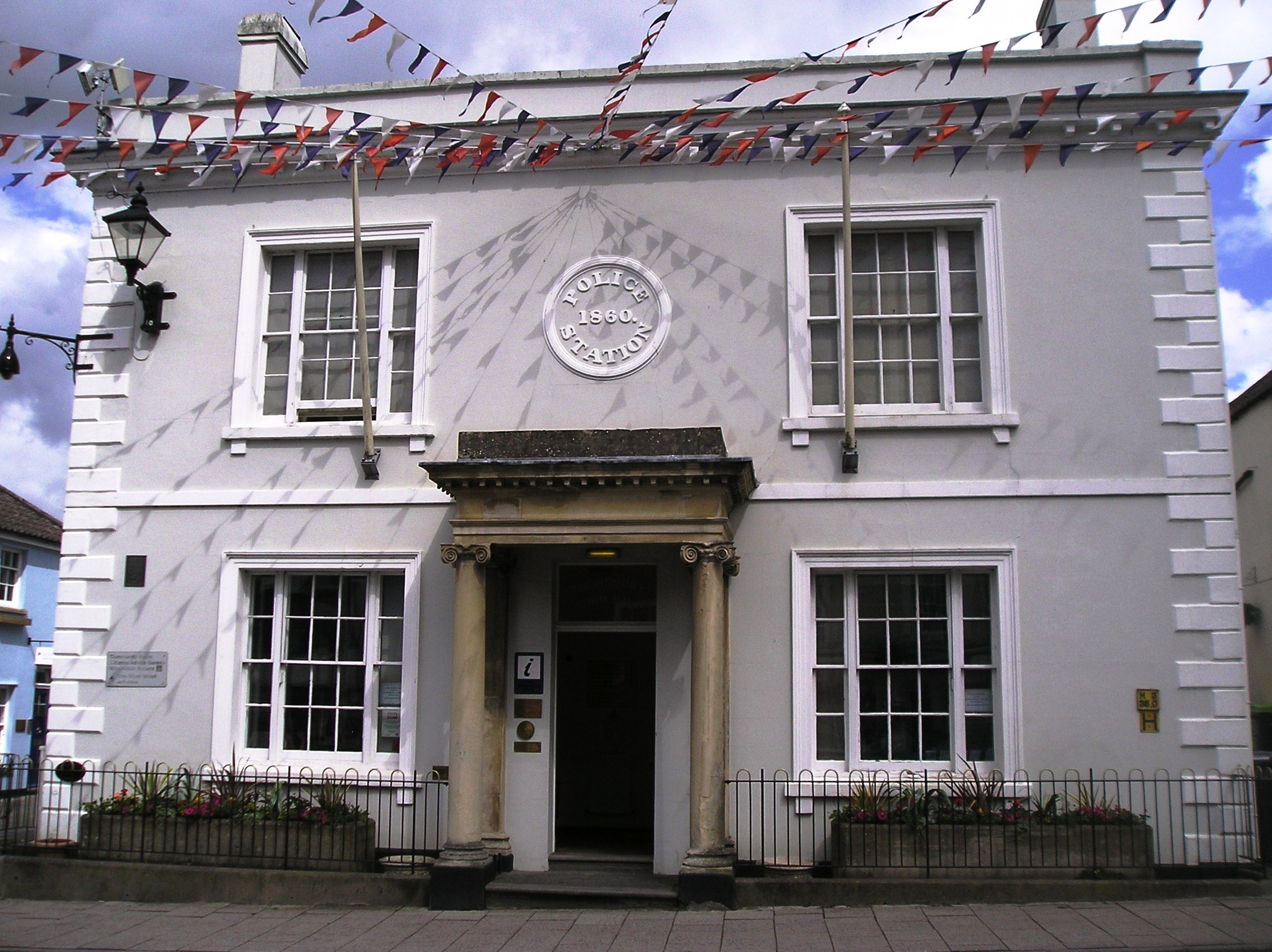
- Thornbury Town Hall

- Location within Gloucestershire
- Population: 14,496 (2021 census)
- OS grid reference: ST636902
- Unitary authority: South Gloucestershire
- Ceremonial county: Gloucestershire
- Region: South West
- Country: England
- Sovereign state: United Kingdom
- Post town: Bristol
- Postcode district: BS35
- Dialling code: 01454
- Police: Avon and Somerset
- Fire: Avon
- Ambulance: South Western
- UK Parliament: Thornbury and Yate

Thornbury is a market town and civil parish in the South Gloucestershire unitary authority area of England, about 12 miles (19 km) north of Bristol. It had a population of 12,063 at the 2011 census, rising to 14,496 in the 2021 census. Thornbury is a Britain in Bloom award-winning town, with its own competition: Thornbury in Bloom. The earliest documentary evidence of a village at "Thornbyrig" dates from the end of the 9th century. The Domesday Book of 1086 noted a manor of "Turneberie" belonging to William the Conqueror’s consort, Matilda of Flanders, with 104 residents.

== History ==
There is evidence of human activity in the Thornbury area in the Neolithic and Bronze Ages, but evidence of the Roman presence is confined to the Thornbury hoard of 11,460 Roman coins dating from 260 to 348 CE, found in 2004 during the digging of a fishpond. The name Thornbury derives from the Old English þornburh meaning 'thorn burh' (fortification). The earliest documentary evidence of a village at "Thornbyrig" dates from the end of the 9th century. Domesday Book noted a manor of "Turneberie" belonging to William the Conqueror's consort, Matilda of Flanders, with 104 residents, after which Turnberrie's community centre is named.

St Mary's Church, begun in the 12th century with later additions, is the oldest surviving building. The town charter was granted in 1252 by Richard de Clare, 6th Earl of Gloucester and lord of the manor of Thornbury. (The charter's 750th anniversary in 2002 was celebrated with a "750" flowerbed planted in Grovesend Road.) The town grew around the site of its cattle market. Thornbury lost its status as a borough in 19th-century local-government reforms, but in 1974 the parish council exercised its new right to designate itself a town council.

The ancient parish covered an area extending to the River Severn, including the detached area of Rangeworthy until 1866, when this became a separate civil parish. In 1894 the western part of Thornbury was detached to form the civil parish of Oldbury-on-Severn and the eastern part to create that of Falfield.

Thornbury Township, Pennsylvania, founded in 1687, was named after Thornbury, Gloucestershire, by George Pearce, whose wife Ann came from there. In 1765 Dr John Fewster of Thornbury presented a paper to the Medical Society of London entitled "Cow Pox and its Ability to Prevent Smallpox". Fewster influenced his friend and colleague Edward Jenner, pioneer of vaccination.

Thornbury was once the terminus of a Midland Railway (later LMS) branch line from Yate on the Bristol to Gloucester main line, with intermediate stations at Iron Acton and Tytherington. It lost its passenger services in June 1944 but continued as a goods route, also serving quarries at Tytherington. The site of Thornbury railway station and the line have been redeveloped into a supermarket, a housing estate, a bypass road and a long footpath. Further relics can be seen at Tytherington Quarry to the east of the town. There are plans to reopen the line to Yate via Tytherington and Iron Acton and possibly restore services to Gloucester and Bristol.

Thornbury held a market in the high street and the market hall. This closed in the late 1990s and was partly replaced by a smaller one in a car park near the United Reformed Church. The older site has been redeveloped as a community centre called "Turnberrie's"; the older community centre, at the Chantry in Castle Street, remains in active use. The old market hall is now a restaurant.

Thornbury's coat of arms combines the arms of four families important to its history: the Attwells – Howard, Clare and Stafford. John Attwells bequeathed £499.99 for the establishment of a free school that merged with the grammar school in 1879. Their arms were later adopted as the badge for Marlwood School. The other three families held the manor at Thornbury over several centuries, with the Latin motto Decus Sabrinae Vallis (Jewel of the Severn Vale).

== Geography ==
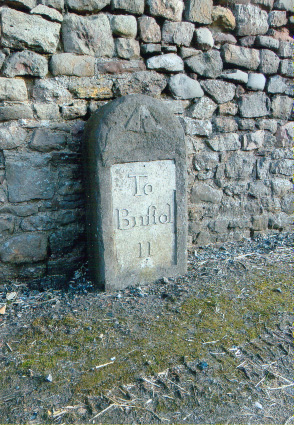
Old Milestone, A38, Grovesend

Thornbury lies in the lower Severn Valley in South Gloucestershire. The parish includes Morton, which is split into Upper and Lower Morton, as areas of farmland to the north-east of Thornbury. There is a large farm shop in Upper Morton, while Lower Morton has several cattle farms. Grovesend is a hamlet on the A38 on the south-east side of the parish. Grovesend Quarry is further east towards Tytherington, but outside the parish.

== Politics ==
Thornbury has belonged successively to the parliamentary constituencies of Thornbury (1885–1950), Stroud and Thornbury (1950–1955), Gloucestershire South (1955–1983), Northavon (1983–2010) and Thornbury and Yate (since 2010). The current member is Claire Young of the Liberal Democrats. Thornbury Town Hall, which is the home of Thornbury Town Council, served as a police station and a magistrates' court before becoming a municipal building.

== Economy ==
One of the biggest firms on the industrial estate in the south of the town is Essilor, which produces spectacle lenses.

== Culture and community ==
=== Arts ===
The largest music and drama venues are the Armstrong Hall near the town centre, seating 350, and the adjacent Cossham Hall, seating 140. Both are under construction, due to reopen in April 2026. Performances also take place in churches, church halls and occasionally in the leisure centre. Some local amateur groups are:

- Thornbury Musical Theatre Group (TMTG), performing at the Armstrong Hall, normally with a musical in October, a pantomime in the February school half-term, and a concert-style production in June. Rehearsals are held at Tytherington Village Hall.
- North Avon Youth Theatre (NYTC) perform an annual show at the Armstrong Hall in April.
- Octopus Thornbury, a drama group which produces a show in June each year, a charity show in October and a pantomime in January. rehearses and performs in Christ the King Church Hall.
- Thornbury Area Music Trust (TAMT), a charitable music trust, runs music groups for those aged 4–18. On Saturday mornings the Thornbury Area Music Centre and Junior Music Centre meet at Marlwood School. They perform regularly at other local venues.
- The South Cotswold Youth Orchestra (SCYO) is for musicians of Grade 5 standard and above. It performs at least one concert per term in the area.
- Thornbury Choral Society (TCS) is a non-auditioned choir bringing concerts to the community.

=== Community facilities ===
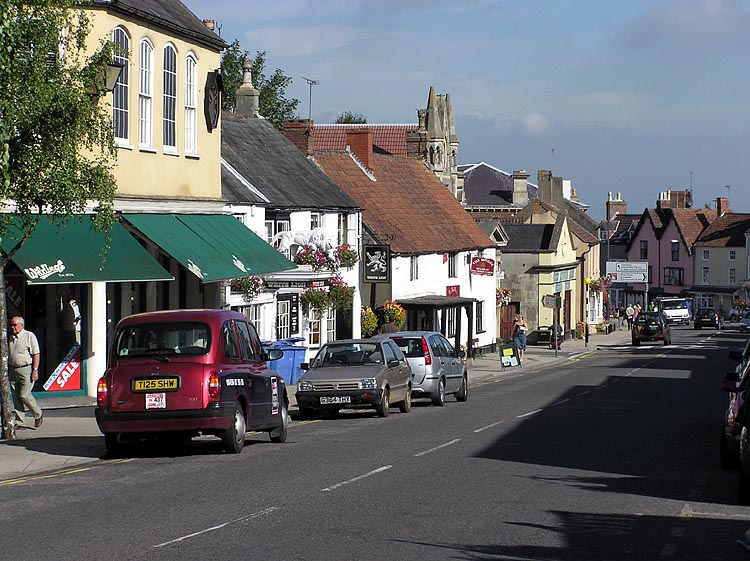
Thornbury High Street. On the left is the old market hall (now commercial premises), the White Lion pub and a Tudor-style house.

Thornbury has a high street, a shopping centre (St Mary's Centre), two supermarkets and smaller shops. Its seven places of worship are St Mary's Church, Christ the King (Anglican), the Catholic Church, the Methodist Church, the United Reformed Church, St Paul's Church, and the Hackett and Thornbury Baptist churches. On the outskirts at Lower Morton stands an independent evangelical church: Morton Baptist Church.

Thornbury has a radio station, Thornbury Radio, which broadcasts on 105.1 and 107.5 FM, and online from its studio at 12 The Plain.

Thornbury is one of a handful of UK towns to have a social group for adults with autism or Asperger syndrome, South Glos Aspies, formed in 2017 and meets weekly.

Filnore Woods is a community woodland covering an area of 6.72 hectares (16.6 acres). It provides a diverse range of habitats for wildlife and plants. It is maintained by local volunteers. The site includes footpaths and a viewpoint overlooking the surrounding area, including the River Severn and the Lower Severn Vale.

== Landmarks ==
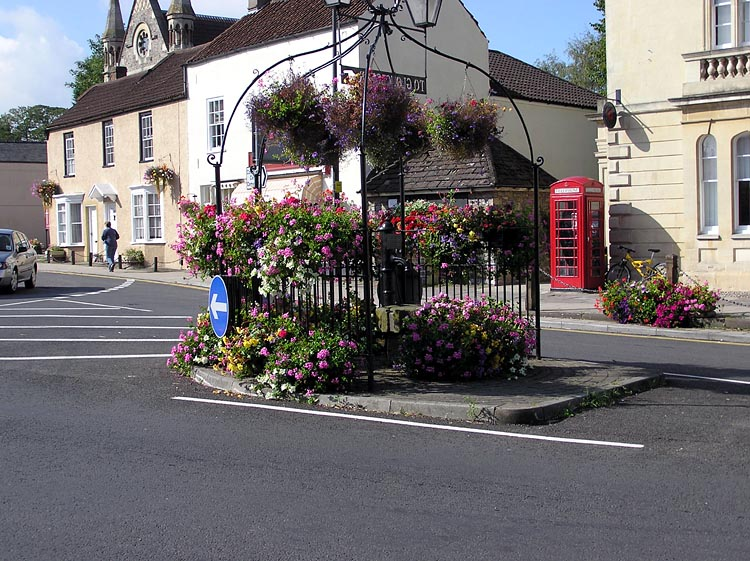
Thornbury town pump (no longer functioning)

The town pump on a small island at the bottom of the High Street shows a hand pointing "To Gloucester". The original pump was removed in 1924 as a road hazard by the council. The new one built in 1984 was temporarily painted gold to celebrate the Golden Jubilee in 2002. It is usually adorned with flowers and birthday greetings.

The MacLaine Memorial Fountain recalls Lieutenant Hector MacLaine, a local man who helped to protect the British in India from the Russians and Afghans in 1880.

=== Thornbury castle ===
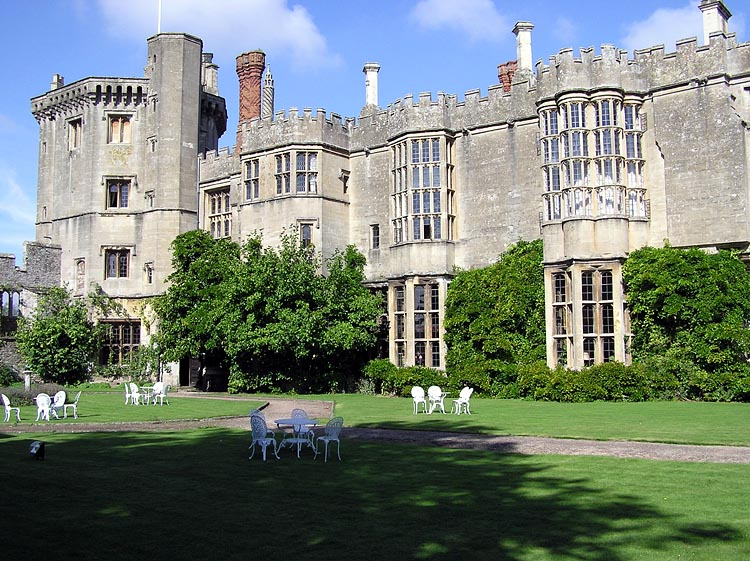
The west front of Thornbury Castle

One of town's notable features is its castle, a Tudor structure begun in 1511 as a home for Edward Stafford, 3rd Duke of Buckingham. The two intricate redbrick chimneys, built in 1514, resemble those found at Hampton Court Palace. Cardinal Wolsey had the Duke beheaded for treason in 1521, after which the castle was confiscated by King Henry VIII, who himself stayed there for ten days in 1535 with Anne Boleyn.

Thornbury Castle fell into disrepair after the English Civil War, but was renovated in 1824 by the Howard Family. It now serves as a 27-room hotel and restaurant.

=== Parish church ===
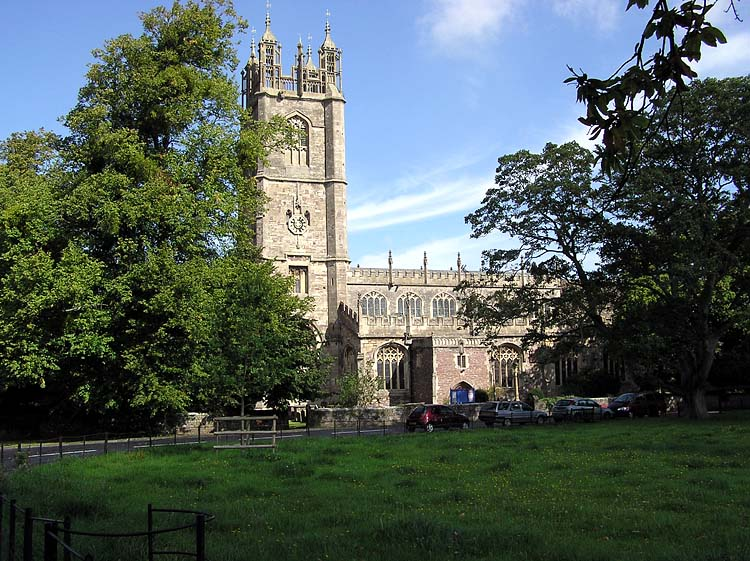
St Mary's Church

Construction of the Anglican Church of Saint Mary the Virgin started in 1340, with major additions in 1500, 1848 and 1988. It remains in use for regular worship, baptisms, confirmations, marriages, funerals and remembrance services. It also hosts the local primary school (St Mary's CEVA Primary) for their seasonal celebrations, such as Harvest, Christmas and Easter. The church is the resting place, according to his will, of the entrails of Jasper Tudor, uncle and mentor to the young Henry Tudor, later Henry VII of England. The rest of his remains were buried in Keynsham Abbey, Somerset, which did not survive the dissolution of the monasteries under Jasper's great-nephew Henry VIII of England. The church is a Grade I listed building.

== Education ==
The Castle School is Thornbury's secondary school. The former Thornbury Grammar School buildings in Gloucester Road were previously used as its sixth-form centre but this moved to the main site in 2024. Thornbury Grammar School moved to new buildings in neighbouring Alveston in 1972, when it received its first comprehensive school intake and was renamed Marlwood School.

Gillingstool Primary School dates from 1862 and is known for its school bell. The school was rebuilt in a project that began in spring 2009. Its Victorian buildings are being retained, as is its mission as a special school.

St Mary's Church of England Primary School, founded in 1839, recently marked its 175th anniversary with events that included a Victorian Week, where children dressed up in period dress, and planted celebratory daffodils. Other schools include Crossways Infant and Junior schools, Christ the King Roman Catholic Primary School, Manorbrook Primary School, New Siblands Special School and the Sheiling School (an independent special school, part of the Camphill Movement). John Attwells's Free School existed in the 19th century. A plaque about it can be seen on a shop in St Mary's Shopping Centre.

== Transport ==
Bus services within the Thornbury area are mainly provided by First West of England. Other operators who provide bus services to/from Thornbury include Eurocoaches and Stagecoach West.

Services connect the town with Bristol bus station; Dursley via Wotton-under-Edge and Charfield or Berkeley; Severn Beach via Olveston and Pilning; Yate and Cribbs Causeway via Thornbury..

Thornbury is also served by the WESTlink on-demand bus, available to the public Monday-Saturday which acts as a rural bus service covering the area around Thornbury.

Major roads and streets in the parish are:

- The B4061 loops off the A38 at Alveston, passes through the centre of the town and rejoins the A38 at Whitfield, so forming the main routes into the town from the north and south.
- Gillingstool and Grovesend Road form an easterly link from the centre to the A38.
- The High Street is on the edge of the town to the west.
- The Plain is at the north end of the High Street, notable for the pump in the middle of the road.
- Castle Street heads north from the Plain to Thornbury Castle and St Mary's Church; it passes several older buildings including The Chantry, which is now used by the community association (TDCA).
- Midland Way and Morton Way are modern additions forming a roughly semi-circular eastern boundary to the town. They allow large goods vehicles headed for the industrial estate to avoid the centre.

The town was served by a railway station, but this has closed.

== Sports and leisure ==
Mundy Playing Fields, donated by Violet Mundy in 1937, include a children's play area and sports ground. Nearby are Thornbury Golf Club, Thornbury Leisure Centre, Thornbury Lawn Tennis Club and a skate park. South Thornbury has a children's play area.

Thornbury RFC plays in the South West 1 League. Though a Thornbury club, its ground lies in Rockhampton on the outskirts.

Thornbury Town FC is Thornbury's main football club. The exact formation date is uncertain, but football was being played in the town in 1896 and there was a Thornbury Town Club in 1898. The youth section, providing for children from six years old and up, was formed in 1990 as a separate club (Thornbury Falcons). In 2010 the two clubs merged as a new Thornbury Town FC. The First Team plays in the Hellenic League Premier Division, which is in the ninth tier in the English football league. Home games are played at the Mundy Playing Fields, with their youth teams playing in various locations around Thornbury. In 2016, an area of land adjacent to the Mundy Playing Fields, known as Poulterbrook, was converted into two purpose-built youth football pitches, as well as allotments for the local community.

Real Thornbury FC plays in the Bristol Premier Combination Premier One, i.e. tier 13 in the English football league. It was set up in 2007 and became an FA-affiliated team in 2009 in the Bristol and District League. the club plays at Oaklands Park in Almondsbury, which has hosted several clubs, including Winterbourne United and Almondsbury Town, both of which have since dissolved.

=== Walking ===
A footpath called Streamside Walk starts at Gillingstool Primary School, passes over several roads and bridges, continues past Thornbury Hospital and Manorbrook Primary School, and on to the north of Thornbury, where the stream leaves the town. Another stream runs through the north-east of Thornbury and emerges at an old mill.

Although the station building has been demolished, the old railway line serves as a footpath. It was laid out in the 1990s to support new housing and industrial developments, previously having been grassed over and neglected. Starting from the industrial estates it follows the route of the streets of Streamleaze and Avon Way, ending near a roundabout at the top of Avon Way.

Created by Thornbury and District Heritage Trust as a millennium project, Thornbury Heritage Trail is a figure of 8 route which encompasses the town's historic buildings. There are 40 bronze way-markers indicating the route, which starts outside the town hall. Additional historic sites on the route also bear a bronze plaque.

The Biodiversity Ring is a 6.5 miles (10.5 km) route. Set up by Sustainable Thornbury in 2023. It uses existing footpaths and wildlife corridors to link sites such as Thornbury Castle, St. Mary's Church, Filnore Woods, the Mundy playing fields, the Medieval Fishponds and Cleve Wood.

== In popular culture ==
The shop front of Wildings (formerly Worthington's) clothing shop was used in the Two Ronnies serial sketch, "The Worm That Turned". The nearby nuclear power station at Oldbury-on-Severn, Tytherington quarry and Stokefield Close were all used as locations for the 1976 four-part Doctor Who serial The Hand of Fear. The Castle School, Thornbury was used for an episode of Casualty broadcast on 2 May 2009.

== Notable people ==
In order of birth:

- Beverley Robinson (1723–1792), American loyalist, died in Thornbury.
- William Holwell (1726–1798), classicist and lexicographer, was presented to the vicarage by Christ Church, Oxford in January 1762.
- John Rolph (1793–1870), Canadian politician, was born in Thornbury.
- George Rolph (1794–1875), Canadian politician, was born in Thornbury.
- Handel Cossham (1824–1890), politician, was born in Thornbury.
- E. M. Grace (1841–1911), international and county cricketer, later played for Thornbury Cricket Club; father of the below.
- Norman Grace (1894–1975), first-class cricketer and Royal Navy officer; son of the above.
- W. N. Hodgson (1893–1916), war poet, was born in Thornbury.
- Florence Margaret Spencer Palmer (1900–1987), composer
- R. W. G. Dennis (1910–2003), mycologist and plant pathologist, was born in Thornbury and attended the grammar school.
- Tony Britton (1924–2019), actor, attended the grammar school.
- Sarah Singleton (born 1966), novelist and children's writer, was born in Thornbury.
- John Robins (born 1982), comedian, grew up in Thornbury.
- Emily Webley-Smith (born 1984), tennis player, was born in Thornbury.
- Matthew Kane (actor) (born 1991), actor, lived and grew up in Thornbury.
- Mako Vunipola (born 1991), rugby player, lived in Thornbury and attended The Castle School.
- Billy Vunipola (born 1992), rugby player, lived here and attended The Castle School.

== Twinning ==
Thornbury is twinned with Bockenem in Germany.

== Gallery ==
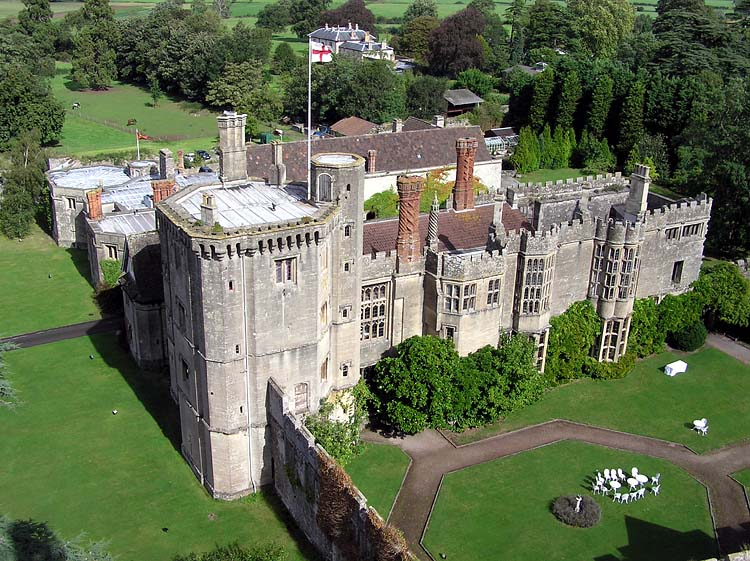
The castle from the top of St Mary's Church tower

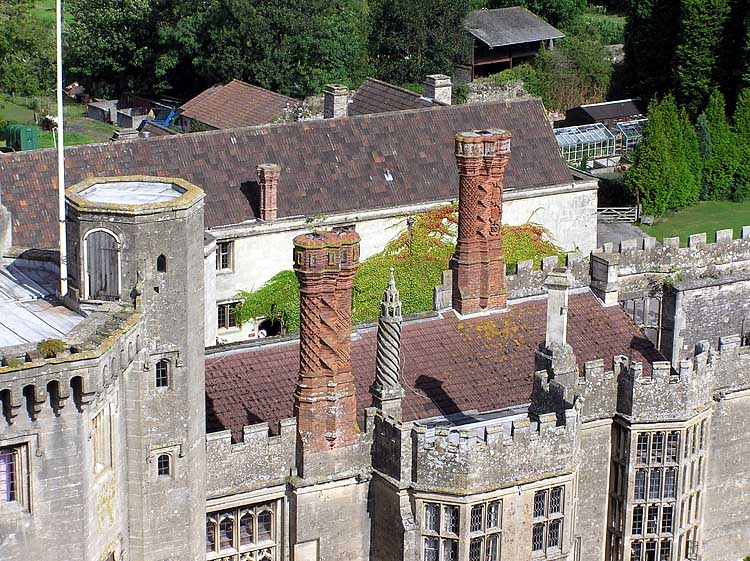
The castle roof. The two brick chimneys were built in 1514

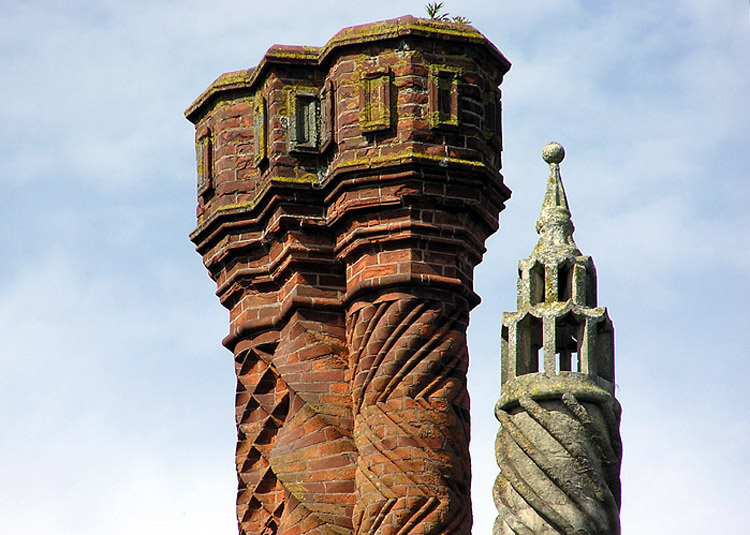
Brick sculpturing on the two chimneys

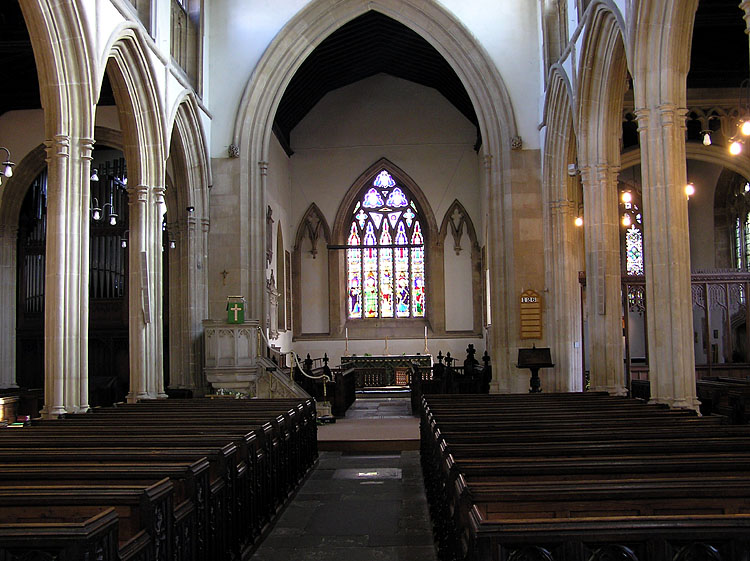
The interior of St Mary's Church (the parish church)

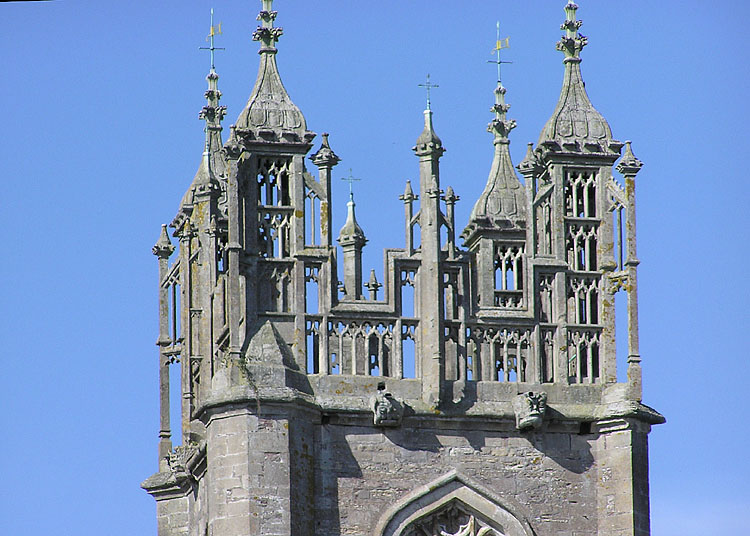
Intricate stonework at the top of St Mary's Church tower

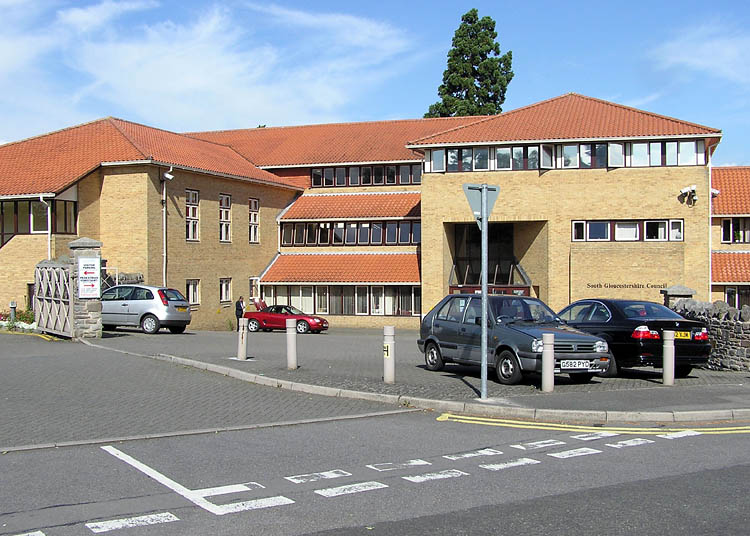
South Gloucestershire Council offices

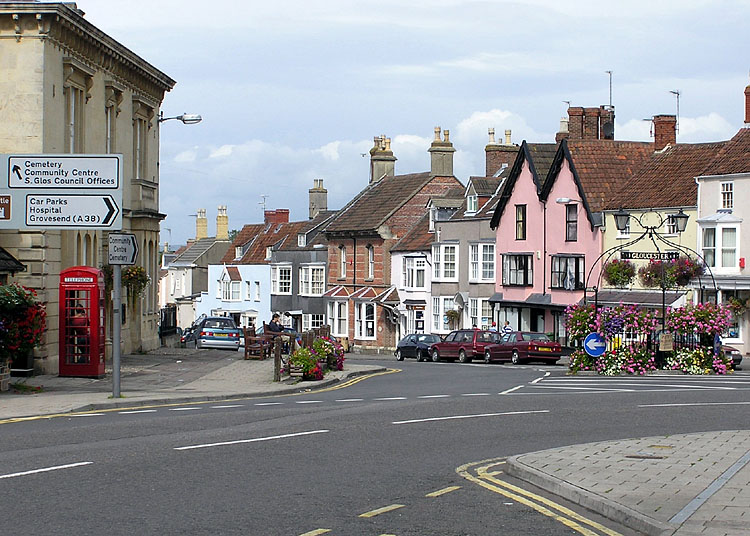
Castle Street and the pump

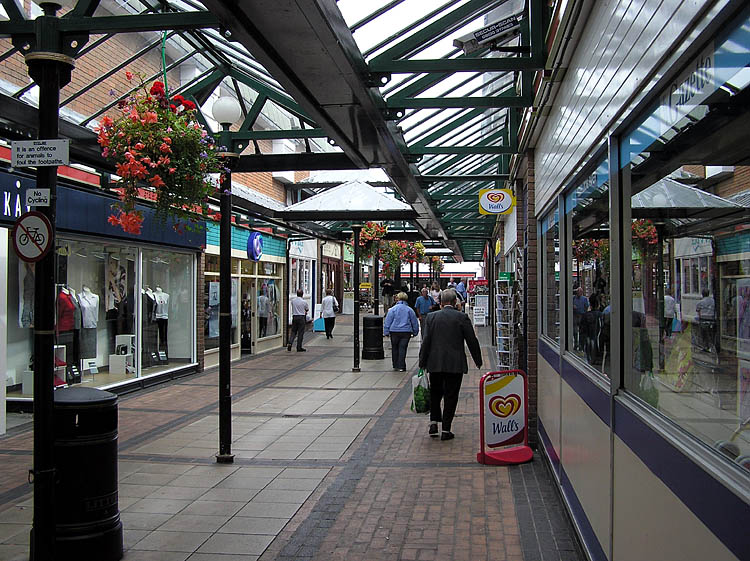
St Mary's Shopping Centre (Needs updating)
