= Manu Vunipola (rugby union, born 1967) =

Tonga international rugby union player & coach

- Born: 1967 (age 58–59) Kolomotu'a, Tonga
- Height: 1.70 m (5 ft 7 in)
- Weight: 82 kg (181 lb)
- Notable relative(s): Feʻao Vunipola (brother); Elisi Vunipola (brother); Mako Vunipola and Billy Vunipola (nephews)
- Occupation(s): Engineer, Minister of Sport of Tonga

Rugby union career
- Position: Scrum-half
Senior career
Years	Team	Apps	(Points)
1987–1999	Toa-ko-Ma'afu RFC		
Provincial / State sides
Years	Team	Apps	(Points)
1987-1991	ʻEua		
International career
Years	Team	Apps	(Points)
1987–1999	Tonga	36	(9)
National sevens team
Years	Team		Comps
	Tonga		1993
Coaching career
- Years: Team
- 2012–2014: Tonga

Manu Vunipola (born circa 1967 in Kolomotu'a,) is a Tongan former rugby union player and former Tonga sevens coach. He played as scrum-half. Currently he is the Minister of Sport of Tonga.

== Career ==
Vunipola debuted for Tonga in the 1987 Rugby World Cup, playing only against Wales, in Palmerston North, on 29 May 1987. He also played the 1995 Rugby World Cup, playing the matches against France and against Scotland, in Pretoria. His last international cap was during the match against Fiji in Nuku'alofa, on 26 June 1999.

== Personal life ==
He is brother of the fly-half Elisi Vunipola and of the hooker Feʻao Vunipola, both Tongan internationals. He is also the uncle of Feʻao's sons, Billy and Mako Vunipola, both England internationals.
