= The Castle School =

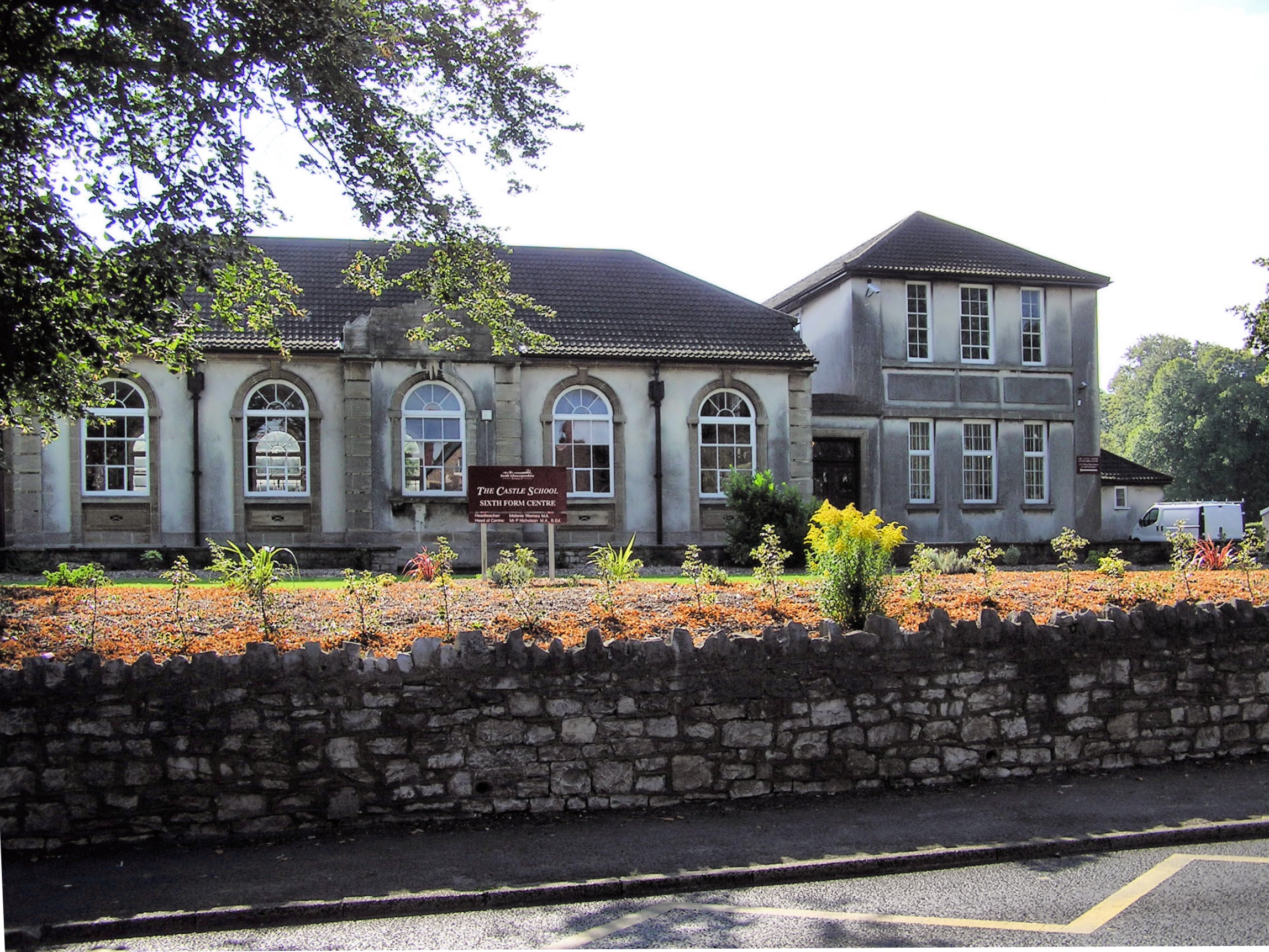
- the former Sixth Form Centre on Gloucester Rd (closed 2024)

Location
- Park Road; Thornbury, Gloucestershire, BS35 1HT; England; 51.6153°N 2.5250°W

Information
- Type: Academy
- Established: 1952; 74 years ago
- Department for Education URN: 139348 Tables
- Ofsted: Reports
- Head teacher: Jessica Lobbett
- Staff: 100
- Gender: Coeducational
- Age: 11 to 18
- Enrolment: 1,538
- Colours: Black, Amber/Gold
- Website: www.thecastleschool.org.uk

The Castle School is a coeducational secondary school and sixth form with academy status, located in Thornbury, South Gloucestershire, England, which serves the town and the surrounding villages. Pupils from Bristol also attend the school. There are around 1,500 pupils, including 300 in the sixth form.

The school site on Park Road has seen additions in recent years including the community sports centre, the Octagon Drama Studio and in 2024 a new Post-16 Centre and a 20-classroom Maths and Science building.

Former headmaster Adrian Verwoert was appointed a CBE for services to education in May 2004. Joining the school in 1980, he was appointed as head in 1988. He was succeeded by Melanie Warnes in September 2004. She left in 2014.

== History ==
In 1862, Handel Cossham, a local preacher, built the original village school, a British School, at Gillingstool. Some years later, because of overcrowding, a new infant school building was added adjacent to the original school. In 1952 the school was separated into infants, juniors and seniors and the latter formed the Thornbury County Secondary school. Before this it was an 'all-age' school taking pupils up to age thirteen, known as Thornbury Council School.

In 1962, during the headship of Mr Cliff J. Martin, plans were drawn up for a new building to house the expanding secondary school. Building work started the following year on Park Road, the site used as the school's playing field. In 1965, the building was opened under the new name of The Castle School, which reflected the school's new position adjacent to Thornbury Castle, whilst keeping the same initials (TCS). The official opening ceremony took place in 1966, attended by the Duke of Beaufort, Chancellor at the University of Bristol at the time.

The county infant and junior schools at Gillingstool later formed the Leaze School, which is now known as Gillingstool Primary School.

The school became a comprehensive in 1972, the same year that Thornbury Grammar School moved from its site on Gloucester Road to new buildings in Alveston (also becoming a comprehensive with the new name of Marlwood School). The Castle School took over the Gloucester Road buildings, which became its Sixth Form Centre for a number of years until the new Post-16 facilities opened in 2024 and the school was able to unite on the Park Road site.

== Notable alumni ==
- Joel Dommett, comedian
- Pfeiffer Georgi, racing cyclist
- Matt Kane, actor, writer and director
- Joe Morrell, Wales and Bristol City football player
- John Robins, comedian
- Kerry Howard, actor
- Billy Vunipola, England and Saracens rugby union player
- Mako Vunipola, England and Saracens rugby union player
- Kate Grey, Paralympic swimmer
