= Mako Vunipola =

English rugby union player (born 1991)

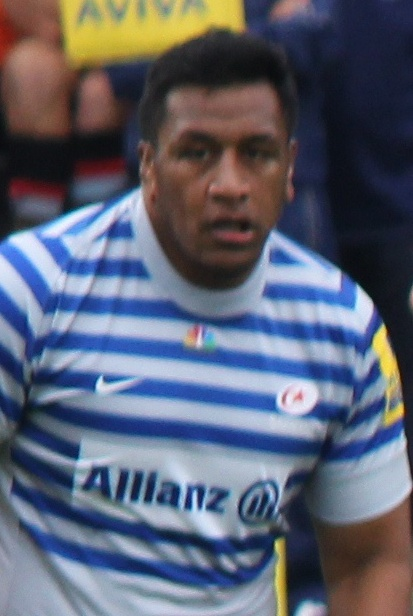
- Vunipola in 2013
- Born: Makovina Wanangarua I Whanga Nui-Atara Vunipola; 14 January 1991 (age 35) Wellington, New Zealand
- Height: 1.80 m (5 ft 11 in)
- Weight: 121 kg (19 st 1 lb; 267 lb)
- School: Porth County Community School; West Monmouth School; The Castle School; Millfield
- Notable relative(s): Feʻao Vunipola (father); Billy Vunipola (brother)

Rugby union career
- Position: Loosehead prop
- Current team: Leicester Tigers
Senior career
Years	Team	Apps	(Points)
2009–2010	Clifton	11	(10)
2010–2011	Bristol	40	(25)
2011–2024	Saracens	234	(105)
2024–2026	Vannes	32	(15)
2026–	Leicester Tigers	6	(0)
- Correct as of 1 November 2026
International career
Years	Team	Apps	(Points)
2010–2011	England U20	12	(10)
2012–2023	England	79	(10)
2013, 2017, 2021	British & Irish Lions	9	(0)
- Correct as of 18 March 2023
Medal record
Men's Rugby union
Representing England
Rugby World Cup
Silver medal – second place	2019 Japan	Squad

Mako Vunipola (born 14 January 1991) is a professional rugby union player who plays as a loosehead prop for Premiership Rugby side Leicester Tigers. He previously played for French club Vannes in the Pro D2 and between 2011 and 2024 played 234 times for Saracens. Born in New Zealand to Tongan parents, he qualified for England through residency having lived and been educated in Wales and then England since the age of 7.

Vunipola made his England debut in 2012 and has since won 79 caps. He toured with the British & Irish Lions in 2013, 2017 and 2021, winning 9 caps. He won the award for England Player of the Year in 2018.

== Early life ==
Born in Wellington, New Zealand, Vunipola was raised for much of his childhood in Wales and attended Porth Junior School, and later West Monmouth School. He started playing rugby in Wales, and played alongside brother Billy for New Panteg RFC. His family then moved to Thornbury, Gloucestershire, and he attended the local comprehensive The Castle School and then Millfield.

== Club career ==
=== Bristol ===
Vunipola began his professional career at Bristol Rugby, and began to build his reputation in the South West, where his performances in open play received positive commentary.

=== Saracens ===
Vunipola was signed at the end of the 2010–11 RFU Championship season by the 2010–11 Premiership Champions Saracens. During his time at Saracens he has won four Premiership titles in 2015, 2016, 2018 and 2019, with Vunipola featuring in three of the four finals (he missed 2019 through injury). He also helped Saracens win the European Rugby Champions Cup three times in four seasons; against Racing 92 in 2016, defeating ASM Clermont Auvergne at Murrayfield to retain their title in 2017 and the victory over Leinster at St James' Park in 2019.

After Saracens were relegated from the Premiership due to salary cap breaches, Vunipola scored a try in the 2021 Championship play-off final as they defeated Ealing Trailfinders to secure promotion and return to the Premiership.

=== Vannes ===
On 2 July 2024, after 13 seasons at Saracens, Vunipola announced his departure from the club, along with his brother Billy Vunipola, as he signs for French side Vannes, who are newly-promoted to the Top 14 competition on a two-year deal from the 2024-25 season.

=== Leicester Tigers ===
In March 2026, he signed for Prem Rugby side Leicester Tigers ahead of the 2026–27 season. In September 2026, he revealed he was planning to retire from rugby altogether before a phone call from Leicester head coach Geoff Parling convinced him to change his mind.

== International career ==
=== England ===
Vunipola represented the England U18 and U20 teams. He was a member of the squad that finished fourth at the 2010 IRB Junior World Championship. Vunipola scored a try against Scotland during the 2011 Six Nations Under 20s Championship and started the final round as England won away against Ireland to complete a grand slam. Later that year he scored a try against Ireland during their opening pool stage fixture at the 2011 IRB Junior World Championship and also started in the final of the tournament as England finished runners up to New Zealand.

In September 2012 Vunipola was called up to the England Saxons squad to replace David Wilson who had been promoted to the senior squad and in October Vunipola was included in the senior England squad for the 2012 Autumn Internationals. On 10 November 2012 he made his Test debut off the bench as a replacement for Joe Marler against Fiji. The following month saw Vunipola receive a yellow card in a victory over New Zealand.

Vunipola scored his first try for England during a 52-11 win over Italy in the final round of the 2014 Six Nations Championship which saw them finish runners up. Vunipola was selected by coach Stuart Lancaster for the 2015 Rugby World Cup and featured in all of their pool fixtures as the hosts failed to make the knockout phase.

In January 2016 new head coach Eddie Jones included Vunipola in his squad for the 2016 Six Nations Championship and he started the concluding game of the tournament as England defeated France to achieve their first grand slam in over a decade. Vunipola was also a member of the side that retained their title during the 2017 Six Nations Championship, missing out on a consecutive grand slam with defeat in the final game away to Ireland which also brought an end to a record equalling eighteen successive Test victories. In June 2018 Vunipola played his 50th test during the opening match of their 2018 tour of South Africa.

Vunipola was included in the squad for the 2019 Rugby World Cup. He started all three knockout games against Australia in the quarter-final, victory over New Zealand in the semi-final and defeat to South Africa in the final as England finished runners up.

After the World Cup Vunipola was a member of the squad that won the 2020 Six Nations Championship and later that year he scored his second international try in an Autumn Nations Cup match against Wales at Parc y Scarlets. An achilles injury sustained in this game ruled out him out of the final of the competition.

He retired from international rugby on 12 January 2024.

=== British and Irish Lions ===
Vunipola was selected for the 2013 British & Irish Lions tour to Australia. He replaced Alex Corbisiero during the second-half of the first test victory, started the defeat in the second test and again came off the bench in the final game as the Lions defeated Australia to win their first series in sixteen years.

In 2017 Vunipola was again included by coach Warren Gatland for his third British and Irish Lions tour. This time Vunipola would be touring to his birthplace in New Zealand. Vunipola's younger brother Billy was selected for the team as well, but withdrew before leaving for New Zealand, and was replaced by James Haskell in the squad. After performances that received positive reviews, Vunipola started against the Māori All Blacks and the opening test of the series. He received a yellow card in the second test for a dangerous tackle on opposing fly-half Beauden Barrett and also started the drawn final game as the series finished level.

In 2021 Vunipola was chosen for his third British and Irish Lions tour to complete the famous trilogy. Coming off the bench in the first test, starting the second test and coming off the bench in the third test, at the end of the tour he finished with nine consecutive test match appearances.

=== International tries ===
As of 28 November 2020.

Try	Opposing team	Location	Venue	Competition	Date	Result	Score
1	Italy	Rome, Italy	Stadio Olimpico	2014 Six Nations	15 March 2014	Win	52 – 11
2	Wales	Llanelli, Wales	Parc y Scarlets	Autumn Nations Cup	28 November 2020	Win	24 – 13

== Personal life ==
Vunipola is the son of former Tonga captain Fe'ao Vunipola and Methodist minister, Iesinga Vunipola. He is also the nephew of two other former international players, Manu and 'Elisi Vunipola who both represented Tonga in the 1990s. His early rugby career began playing for New Panteg RFC, playing alongside current Welsh number 8 Taulupe Faletau. He has a brother, Billy Vunipola who plays at number 8 for Saracens and England. In 2018, Vunipola and his partner had a son, Jacob.

== Honours ==
England

- Six Nations Championship: 2016, 2017, 2020
- Rugby World Cup runner-up: 2019

Saracens

- European Rugby Champions Cup: 2015–16, 2016-17, 2018-19
- Premiership: 2014-15, 2015-16, 2017-18, 2018-19
- RFU Championship: 2020-21
