= 2018 England rugby union tour of South Africa =

- Coach: Eddie Jones
- Tour captain: Owen Farrell
- Top test point scorer: Owen Farrell (33)
- Top test try scorer: Jonny May (3)
Summary
P	W	D	L
Total
3	1	0	2
Test match
3	1	0	2
Opponent
P	W	D	L
South Africa
3	1	0	2

Tour chronology
- ← Argentina 2017 Australia 2022 →

In June 2018, England played a three-test series against South Africa as part of the 2018 mid-year rugby union tests. The series was part of the sixth year of the global rugby calendar established by World Rugby, which runs through to 2019.

== Fixtures ==
Date	Venue	Home	Score	Away
9 June	Ellis Park, Johannesburg	South Africa	42–39	England
16 June	Free State Stadium, Bloemfontein	South Africa	23–12	England
23 June	Newlands, Cape Town	South Africa	10–25	England

== Squads ==
Note: Ages, caps and clubs are as per 9 June, the first test match of the tour.

=== England ===
On 29 May, England finalised a 34-man tour squad for their 3-test series summer tour of South Africa.

On 11 June, Jack Singleton joined the squad as a third choice hooker option and injury cover for Luke Cowan-Dickie.

Coaching team:

- Head coach: (Australia) Eddie Jones
- Attack coach: (Australia) Scott Wisemantel
- Defence coach: (England) Paul Gustard
- Forwards coach: (England) Steve Borthwick
- Scrum coach: (England) Neal Hatley

Player	Position	Date of birth (age)	Caps	Club/province
Luke Cowan-Dickie	Hooker	20 June 1993 (aged 24)	7	(England) Exeter Chiefs
Jamie George	Hooker	20 October 1990 (aged 27)	25	(England) Saracens
Jack Singleton	Hooker	14 May 1996 (aged 22)	0	(England) Worcester Warriors
Ellis Genge	Prop	16 February 1995 (aged 23)	5	(England) Leicester Tigers
Joe Marler	Prop	7 July 1990 (aged 27)	56	(England) Harlequins
Kyle Sinckler	Prop	30 March 1992 (aged 26)	10	(England) Harlequins
Mako Vunipola	Prop	14 January 1991 (aged 27)	49	(England) Saracens
Harry Williams	Prop	1 October 1991 (aged 26)	8	(England) Exeter Chiefs
Jonny Hill	Lock	8 June 1994 (aged 24)	0	(England) Exeter Chiefs
Nick Isiekwe	Lock	20 April 1998 (aged 20)	2	(England) Saracens
Maro Itoje	Lock	28 October 1994 (aged 23)	19	(England) Saracens
Joe Launchbury	Lock	12 April 1991 (aged 27)	52	(England) Wasps
Tom Curry	Flanker	15 June 1998 (aged 19)	1	(England) Sale Sharks
Chris Robshaw	Flanker	4 June 1986 (aged 32)	64	(England) Harlequins
Brad Shields	Flanker	2 April 1991 (aged 27)	0	(New Zealand) Hurricanes
Sam Simmonds	Flanker	10 November 1994 (aged 23)	7	(England) Exeter Chiefs
Mark Wilson	Flanker	6 October 1989 (aged 28)	2	(England) Newcastle Falcons
Ben Earl	Number 8	7 January 1998 (aged 20)	0	(England) Saracens
Nathan Hughes	Number 8	10 June 1991 (aged 26)	14	(England) Wasps
Billy Vunipola	Number 8	3 November 1992 (aged 25)	34	(England) Saracens
Dan Robson	Scrum-half	14 March 1992 (aged 26)	0	(England) Wasps
Ben Spencer	Scrum-half	31 July 1992 (aged 25)	0	(England) Saracens
Ben Youngs	Scrum-half	5 September 1989 (aged 28)	74	(England) Leicester Tigers
Danny Cipriani	Fly-half	2 November 1987 (aged 30)	14	(England) Gloucester Rugby
George Ford	Fly-half	16 March 1993 (aged 25)	45	(England) Leicester Tigers
Piers Francis	Fly-half	20 June 1990 (aged 27)	3	(England) Northampton Saints
Owen Farrell (c)	Centre	24 September 1991 (aged 26)	58	(England) Saracens
Alex Lozowski	Centre	30 June 1993 (aged 24)	4	(England) Saracens
Henry Slade	Centre	19 March 1993 (aged 25)	10	(England) Exeter Chiefs
Elliot Daly	Wing	8 October 1992 (aged 25)	18	(England) Wasps
Nathan Earle	Wing	25 September 1994 (aged 23)	0	(England) Saracens
Jonny May	Wing	1 April 1990 (aged 28)	34	(England) Leicester Tigers
Denny Solomona	Wing	27 September 1993 (aged 24)	2	(England) Sale Sharks
Mike Brown	Fullback	4 September 1985 (aged 32)	69	(England) Harlequins
Jason Woodward	Fullback	17 May 1990 (aged 28)	0	(England) Gloucester

=== South Africa ===
On 26 May 2018, head coach Rassie Erasmus named a 43-man squad for South Africa's June Internationals.

Coaching team:

- Head coach: (South Africa) Rassie Erasmus
- Attack coach: (South Africa) Mzwandile Stick
- Defence coach: (South Africa) Jacques Nienaber
- Scrum coach: (France) Pieter de Villiers

Player	Position	Date of birth (age)	Caps	Club/province
Bismarck du Plessis	Hooker	22 May 1984 (aged 34)	79	(France) Montpellier
Bongi Mbonambi	Hooker	7 January 1991 (aged 27)	14	(South Africa) Stormers
Chiliboy Ralepelle	Hooker	11 September 1986 (aged 31)	24	(South Africa) Sharks
Akker van der Merwe	Hooker	17 June 1991 (aged 26)	1	(South Africa) Sharks
Thomas du Toit	Prop	5 May 1995 (aged 23)	1	(South Africa) Sharks
Steven Kitshoff	Prop	10 February 1992 (aged 26)	24	(South Africa) Stormers
Wilco Louw	Prop	20 July 1994 (aged 23)	6	(South Africa) Stormers
Frans Malherbe	Prop	14 March 1991 (aged 27)	17	(South Africa) Stormers
Tendai Mtawarira	Prop	1 August 1985 (aged 32)	98	(South Africa) Sharks
Ox Nché	Prop	23 July 1995 (aged 22)	1	(South Africa) Cheetahs
Trevor Nyakane	Prop	4 May 1989 (aged 29)	37	(South Africa) Bulls
Pieter-Steph du Toit	Lock	20 August 1992 (aged 25)	33	(South Africa) Stormers
Jason Jenkins	Lock	2 December 1995 (aged 22)	1	(South Africa) Bulls
Franco Mostert	Lock	27 November 1990 (aged 27)	18	(South Africa) Lions
Marvin Orie	Lock	15 February 1993 (aged 25)	1	(South Africa) Lions
RG Snyman	Lock	29 January 1995 (aged 23)	0	(South Africa) Bulls
Nizaam Carr	Flanker	4 April 1991 (aged 27)	5	(South Africa) Stormers
Jean-Luc du Preez	Flanker	5 August 1995 (aged 22)	10	(South Africa) Sharks
Siya Kolisi	Flanker	16 June 1991 (aged 26)	28	(South Africa) Stormers
Oupa Mohojé	Flanker	3 August 1990 (aged 27)	19	(South Africa) Cheetahs
Sikhumbuzo Notshe	Flanker	28 May 1993 (aged 25)	1	(South Africa) Stormers
Kwagga Smith	Flanker	11 June 1993 (aged 24)	1	(South Africa) Lions
Dan du Preez	Number 8	5 August 1995 (aged 22)	4	(South Africa) Sharks
Duane Vermeulen	Number 8	3 July 1986 (aged 31)	39	(France) Toulon
Faf de Klerk	Scrum-half	19 October 1991 (aged 26)	11	(England) Sale Sharks
Embrose Papier	Scrum-half	25 April 1997 (aged 21)	1	(South Africa) Bulls
Ivan van Zyl	Scrum-half	30 June 1995 (aged 22)	1	(South Africa) Bulls
Cameron Wright	Scrum-half	20 April 1994 (aged 24)	0	(South Africa) Sharks
Robert du Preez	Fly-half	30 July 1993 (aged 24)	1	(South Africa) Sharks
Elton Jantjies	Fly-half	1 August 1990 (aged 27)	24	(South Africa) Lions
Handré Pollard	Fly-half	11 March 1994 (aged 24)	26	(South Africa) Bulls
Lukhanyo Am	Centre	28 November 1993 (aged 24)	1	(South Africa) Sharks
Damian de Allende	Centre	25 November 1991 (aged 26)	28	(South Africa) Stormers
André Esterhuizen	Centre	30 March 1994 (aged 24)	1	(South Africa) Sharks
Jesse Kriel	Centre	15 February 1994 (aged 24)	30	(South Africa) Bulls
François Steyn	Centre	14 May 1987 (aged 31)	56	(France) Montpellier
Aphiwe Dyantyi	Wing	26 August 1994 (aged 23)	0	(South Africa) Lions
Travis Ismaiel	Wing	2 June 1992 (aged 26)	1	(South Africa) Bulls
Makazole Mapimpi	Wing	26 July 1990 (aged 27)	1	(South Africa) Sharks
S'busiso Nkosi	Wing	21 January 1996 (aged 22)	0	(South Africa) Sharks
Curwin Bosch	Fullback	25 June 1997 (aged 20)	2	(South Africa) Sharks
Warrick Gelant	Fullback	20 May 1995 (aged 23)	3	(South Africa) Bulls
Willie le Roux	Fullback	18 August 1989 (aged 28)	41	(England) Wasps

== Matches ==
=== English warm-up match (Barbarians) ===
27 May 2018
15:00 BST (UTC+01)

England	45–63	Barbarians
Try: Daly 16' c Francis (2) 20' c, 30' c Mercer 27' c Launchbury 55' c May 76' c Con: Ford (6/6) 18', 20', 28', 31', 55', 76'; Pen: Ford (1/1) 48'	Report	Try: Ashton (3) 3' c, 6' c, 24' c Vito (2) 11' c, 79' c Russell 38' c Radradra 43' c Timani 59' c Laidlaw 71' c Con: Russell (7/7) 3', 7', 12', 26', 40', 44', 59'; Laidlaw (1/1) 72'; Fernández Lobbe (1/1) 80'

Twickenham, London
Attendance: 51,636
Referee: Mathieu Raynal (France)

FB	15	Elliot Daly
RW	14	Jonny May
OC	13	Henry Trinder	(substituted off) 26'
IC	12	Piers Francis
LW	11	Mike Brown	(substituted off) 49'
FH	10	George Ford
SH	9	Ben Youngs	(substituted off) 61'
N8	8	Zach Mercer	(substituted off) 46'
OF	7	Tom Curry
BF	6	Chris Robshaw (c)
RL	5	Joe Launchbury
LL	4	Elliott Stooke	(substituted off) 59'
TP	3	Kyle Sinckler	(substituted off) 61'
HK	2	Jack Singleton	(substituted off) 70'
LP	1	Joe Marler	(substituted off) 46'
Replacements:
HK	16	George McGuigan	(substituted on) 70'
PR	17	Ellis Genge	(substituted on) 46'
PR	18	Nick Schonert	(substituted on) 61'
LK	19	Josh Beaumont	(substituted on) 59'
FL	20	Mark Wilson	(substituted on) 46'
SH	21	Dan Robson	(substituted on) 61'
FH	22	Danny Cipriani	(substituted on) 26'
WG	23	Denny Solomona	(substituted on) 49'
Coach:
(Australia) Eddie Jones

FB	15	(England) Chris Ashton
RW	14	(Fiji) Josua Tuisova
OC	13	(Fiji) Semi Radradra
IC	12	(Fiji) Josh Matavesi	(substituted off) 53'
LW	11	(Ireland) Niyi Adeolokun
FH	10	(Scotland) Finn Russell	(substituted off) 68'
SH	9	(Wales) Rhodri Williams	(substituted off) 60'
N8	8	(New Zealand) Victor Vito
OF	7	(Wales) Justin Tipuric
BF	6	(Argentina) Juan Martín Fernández Lobbe (c)	(substituted off) 52'
RL	5	(Australia) Sitaleki Timani	(substituted off) 60'
LL	4	(Ireland) Ultan Dillane
TP	3	(New Zealand) John Afoa	(substituted off) 65'
HK	2	(France) Benjamin Kayser	(substituted off) 56'
LP	1	(Ireland) Denis Buckley	(substituted off) 47'
Replacements:
HK	16	(Australia) Tatafu Polota-Nau	(substituted on) 56'
PR	17	(New Zealand) Loni Uhila	(substituted on) 47'
PR	18	(Argentina) Ramiro Herrera	(substituted on) 65'
LK	19	(Samoa) Joe Tekori	(substituted on) 60'
N8	20	(Tonga) Nili Latu	(substituted on) 52'
SH	21	(Scotland) Greig Laidlaw	(substituted on) 60'
FH	22	(New Zealand) Luke McAlister	(substituted on) 68'
WG	23	(New Zealand) Malakai Fekitoa	(substituted on) 53'
Coach:
(Samoa) Pat Lam

Man of the Match:
(Fiji) Semi Radradra (Barbarians)

Touch judges:
Nigel Owens (Wales)
Ben Whitehouse (Wales)
Television match official:
Brian MacNeice (Ireland)

Notes:

- This is the first time since 2014 the Barbarians has defeated England.

=== South African warm-up match (Wales) ===
2 June 2018
17:00 EDT (UTC-4)

South Africa	20–22	Wales
Try: Ismaiel 43' c Mapimpi 58' c Con: Jantjies (2/2) 44', 59'; Pen: Jantjies (1/1) 18'; R. du Preez (1/1) 73'	Report	Try: Amos 30' c Williams 33' c Elias 74' m Con: Anscombe (2/3) 31', 35'; Pen: Anscombe (1/3) 47'

RFK Stadium, Washington, D.C.
Attendance: 21,357
Referee: Matthew Carley (England)

FB	15	Curwin Bosch	(substituted off) 31'	(substituted on) 40'	(substituted off) 49'
RW	14	Travis Ismaiel
OC	13	Jesse Kriel
IC	12	André Esterhuizen
LW	11	Makazole Mapimpi	(substituted off) 76'
FH	10	Elton Jantjies	(substituted off) 71'
SH	9	Ivan van Zyl
N8	8	Dan du Preez			(substituted off) 53'
OF	7	Oupa Mohojé
BF	6	Kwagga Smith	10' to 19'
RL	5	Pieter-Steph du Toit (c)
LL	4	Jason Jenkins	(substituted off) 61'
TP	3	Wilco Louw	(substituted off) 44'
HK	2	Chiliboy Ralepelle	(substituted off) 52'
LP	1	Ox Nché	(substituted off) 44'
Replacements:
HK	16	Akker van der Merwe	(substituted on) 52'
PR	17	Steven Kitshoff	(substituted on) 44'
PR	18	Thomas du Toit	(substituted on) 44'
LK	19	Marvin Orie	(substituted on) 61'
FL	20	Sikhumbuzo Notshe	(substituted on) 10'	(substituted off) 19'	(substituted on) 53'
SH	21	Embrose Papier	(substituted on) 76'
FH	22	Robert du Preez	(substituted on) 61'
WG	23	Warrick Gelant	(substituted on) 31'	(substituted off) 40'	(substituted on) 49'
Coach:
(South Africa) Rassie Erasmus

FB	15	Hallam Amos
RW	14	Tom Prydie
OC	13	George North
IC	12	Owen Watkin	(yellow card) 56' to 66'
LW	11	Steff Evans		(substituted off) 29'
FH	10	Gareth Anscombe
SH	9	Tomos Williams		(substituted off) 78'
N8	8	Ross Moriarty
OF	7	Ellis Jenkins (c)
BF	6	Seb Davies
RL	5	Cory Hill
LL	4	Bradley Davies
TP	3	Dillon Lewis		(substituted off) 52'
HK	2	Elliot Dee		(substituted off) 70'
LP	1	Nicky Smith		(substituted off) 48'
Replacements:
HK	16	Ryan Elias		(substituted on) 70'
PR	17	Wyn Jones		(substituted on) 48'
PR	18	Rhodri Jones		(substituted on) 52'
LK	19	Adam Beard
FL	20	Aaron Wainwright
SH	21	Aled Davies		(substituted on) 78'
FH	22	Rhys Patchell
CE	23	Hadleigh Parkes		(substituted on) 29'
Coach:
(New Zealand) Warren Gatland

Man of the Match:
Ellis Jenkins (Wales)

Touch judges:
Alexandre Ruiz (France)
Frank Murphy (Ireland)
Television match official:
David Grashoff (England)

Notes:

- Tomos Williams (Wales) and Robert du Preez, Thomas du Toit, André Esterhuizen, Travis Ismaiel, Jason Jenkins, Makazole Mapimpi, Ox Nché, Sikhumbuzo Notshe, Marvin Orie, Embrose Papier, Kwagga Smith, Akker van der Merwe and Ivan van Zyl (all South Africa) made their international debuts.
- This victory saw Wales record a record third consecutive win against the Springboks, and win for the first time at a neutral venue against South Africa.

=== First test ===
9 June 2018
17:05 SAST (UTC+02)

South Africa	42–39	England
Try: De Klerk 19' m Nkosi (2) 29' c, 33' c Le Roux 38' c Dyantyi 64' c Con: Pollard (4/5) 30', 34', 39', 65'; Pen: Pollard (3/5) 10', 51', 75'	Report	Try: Brown 3' c Daly 12' c Farrell 16' c Itoje 69' m May 77' c Con: Farrell (4/5) 4', 14', 17', 77'; Pen: Daly (1/1) 1'; Farrell (1/1) 40'

Emirates Airline Park, Johannesburg
Attendance: 55,260
Referee: Ben O'Keeffe (New Zealand)

FB	15	Willie le Roux	(substituted off) 63'
RW	14	S'busiso Nkosi
OC	13	Lukhanyo Am
IC	12	Damian de Allende	(substituted off) 73'
LW	11	Aphiwe Dyantyi
FH	10	Handré Pollard
SH	9	Faf de Klerk	(substituted off) 72'
N8	8	Duane Vermeulen
OF	7	Jean-Luc du Preez	(substituted off) 49'
BF	6	Siya Kolisi (c)	(substituted off) 70'
RL	5	Franco Mostert
LL	4	RG Snyman
TP	3	Wilco Louw	(substituted off) 47'
HK	2	Bongi Mbonambi	(substituted off) 57'
LP	1	Tendai Mtawarira	(substituted off) 47'
Replacements:
HK	16	Akker van der Merwe	(substituted on) 57'
PR	17	Steven Kitshoff	(substituted on) 47'
PR	18	Thomas du Toit	(substituted on) 47'
LK	19	Pieter-Steph du Toit	(substituted on) 49'
FL	20	Sikhumbuzo Notshe	(substituted on) 70'
SH	21	Ivan van Zyl	(substituted on) 72'
FH	22	Elton Jantjies	(substituted on) 73'
WG	23	Warrick Gelant	(substituted on) 63'
Coach:
(South Africa) Rassie Erasmus

FB	15	Elliot Daly
RW	14	Jonny May
OC	13	Henry Slade
IC	12	Owen Farrell (c)
LW	11	Mike Brown		(substituted off) 75'
FH	10	George Ford		(substituted off) 75'
SH	9	Ben Youngs		(substituted off) 75'
N8	8	Billy Vunipola
OF	7	Tom Curry		(substituted off) 65'
BF	6	Chris Robshaw
RL	5	Nick Isiekwe		(substituted off) 35'
LL	4	Maro Itoje
TP	3	Kyle Sinckler		(substituted off) 57'
HK	2	Jamie George		(substituted off) 63'
LP	1	Mako Vunipola	(yellow card) 62' to 72'	(substituted off) 75'
Replacements:
HK	16	Luke Cowan-Dickie		(substituted on) 63'
PR	17	Joe Marler		(substituted on) 75'
PR	18	Harry Williams		(substituted on) 57'
FL	19	Brad Shields		(substituted on) 35'
N8	20	Nathan Hughes		(substituted on) 65'
SH	21	Ben Spencer		(substituted on) 75'
FH	22	Piers Francis		(substituted on) 75'
WG	23	Denny Solomona		(substituted on) 75'
Coach:
(Australia) Eddie Jones

Man of the Match:
Faf de Klerk (South Africa)

Touch judges:
Romain Poite (France)
Glen Jackson (New Zealand)
Television match official:
Simon McDowell (Ireland)

Notes:

- Aphiwe Dyantyi, S'busiso Nkosi and RG Snyman (all South Africa) and Brad Shields and Ben Spencer (both England) made their international debuts.
- Mako Vunipola (England) earned his 50th test cap.

=== Second test ===
16 June 2018
17:05 SAST (UTC+02)

South Africa	23–12	England
Try: Vermeulen 23' c Penalty try 49'; Con: Pollard (1/1) 24'; Pen: Pollard (3/4) 28', 38', 66'	Report	Try: Brown 9' c May 12' m Con: Farrell (1/2) 10'

Toyota Stadium, Bloemfontein
Referee: Romain Poite (France)

FB	15	Willie le Roux
RW	14	S'busiso Nkosi
OC	13	Lukhanyo Am	(substituted off) 59'
IC	12	Damian de Allende
LW	11	Aphiwe Dyantyi
FH	10	Handré Pollard
SH	9	Faf de Klerk	(substituted off) 74'
N8	8	Duane Vermeulen
OF	7	Pieter-Steph du Toit
BF	6	Siya Kolisi (c)	(substituted off) 65'
RL	5	Franco Mostert
LL	4	RG Snyman	(substituted off) 55'
TP	3	Frans Malherbe	(substituted off) 44'
HK	2	Bongi Mbonambi	(substituted off) 50'
LP	1	Tendai Mtawarira	(substituted off) 44'
Replacements:
HK	16	Akker van der Merwe	(substituted on) 50'
PR	17	Steven Kitshoff	(substituted on) 44'
PR	18	Thomas du Toit	(substituted on) 44'
FL	19	Jean-Luc du Preez	(substituted on) 55'
FL	20	Sikhumbuzo Notshe	(substituted on) 65'
SH	21	Ivan van Zyl	(substituted on) 74'
CE	22	Jesse Kriel	(substituted on) 59'
WG	23	Warrick Gelant
Coach:
(South Africa) Rassie Erasmus

FB	15	Elliot Daly
RW	14	Jonny May
OC	13	Henry Slade
IC	12	Owen Farrell (c)
LW	11	Mike Brown		(substituted off) 66'
FH	10	George Ford		(substituted off) 66'
SH	9	Ben Youngs		(substituted off) 72'
N8	8	Billy Vunipola		(substituted off) 40'
OF	7	Tom Curry
BF	6	Brad Shields		(substituted off) 66'
RL	5	Maro Itoje
LL	4	Joe Launchbury
TP	3	Kyle Sinckler		(substituted off) 50'
HK	2	Jamie George		(substituted off) 61'
LP	1	Mako Vunipola		(substituted off) 57'
Replacements:
HK	16	Luke Cowan-Dickie		(substituted on) 61'
PR	17	Joe Marler		(substituted on) 57'
PR	18	Harry Williams		(substituted on) 50'
FL	19	Mark Wilson		(substituted on) 66'
N8	20	Nathan Hughes	(yellow card) 68' to 78'	(substituted on) 40'
SH	21	Ben Spencer		(substituted on) 72'
FH	22	Danny Cipriani		(substituted on) 66'
WG	23	Denny Solomona		(substituted on) 66'
Coach:
(Australia) Eddie Jones

Man of the Match:
Duane Vermeulen (South Africa)

Touch judges:
Glen Jackson (New Zealand)
Ben O'Keeffe (New Zealand)
Television match official:
Simon McDowell (Ireland)

Notes:

- Tendai Mtawarira (South Africa) earned his 100th test cap.

=== Third test ===
23 June 2018
17:05 SAST (UTC+02)

South Africa	10–25	England
Try: Kriel 45' c Con: Jantjies (1/1) 46'; Pen: Jantjies (1/2) 40'		Try: May 71' c Con: Farrell (1/1) 72'; Pen: Farrell (6/6) 9', 36', 43', 49', 57', 75'

Newlands Stadium, Cape Town
Attendance: 33,827
Referee: Glen Jackson (New Zealand)

FB	15	Warrick Gelant
RW	14	S'busiso Nkosi	(substituted off) 49'
OC	13	Jesse Kriel
IC	12	André Esterhuizen
LW	11	Aphiwe Dyantyi
FH	10	Elton Jantjies	(substituted off) 57'
SH	9	Faf de Klerk	(substituted off) 75'
N8	8	Duane Vermeulen
OF	7	Pieter-Steph du Toit
BF	6	Siya Kolisi (c)	(substituted off) 65'
RL	5	Franco Mostert
LL	4	RG Snyman	(substituted off) 57'
TP	3	Frans Malherbe	(substituted off) 43'
HK	2	Chiliboy Ralepelle	(substituted off) 43'
LP	1	Tendai Mtawarira	(substituted off) 43'
Replacements:
HK	16	Schalk Brits	(substituted on) 43'
PR	17	Steven Kitshoff	(substituted on) 43'
PR	18	Thomas du Toit	(substituted on) 43'
FL	19	Jean-Luc du Preez	(substituted on) 57'
FL	20	Sikhumbuzo Notshe	(substituted on) 65'
SH	21	Embrose Papier	(substituted on) 75'
CE	22	Handré Pollard	(substituted on) 57'
FB	23	Willie le Roux	(substituted on) 49'
Coach:
(South Africa) Rassie Erasmus

FB	15	Elliot Daly
RW	14	Jonny May
OC	13	Henry Slade	(substituted off) 77'
IC	12	Owen Farrell (c)
LW	11	Mike Brown
FH	10	Danny Cipriani
SH	9	Ben Youngs
N8	8	Nathan Hughes	(substituted off) 52'
OF	7	Tom Curry
BF	6	Chris Robshaw
RL	5	Maro Itoje
LL	4	Joe Launchbury
TP	3	Kyle Sinckler	(substituted off) 47'
HK	2	Jamie George
LP	1	Joe Marler
Replacements:
HK	16	Luke Cowan-Dickie
PR	17	Alec Hepburn
PR	18	Harry Williams	(substituted on) 47'
LK	19	Jonny Hill
FL	20	Mark Wilson	(substituted on) 52'
FL	21	Sam Simmonds
SH	22	Ben Spencer
WG	23	Denny Solomona	(substituted on) 77'
Coach:
(Australia) Eddie Jones

Man of the Match:
Jonny May (England)

Touch judges:
Romain Poite (France)
Ben O'Keeffe (New Zealand)
Television match official:
Simon McDowell (Ireland)

Notes:

- This was England's first victory over South Africa in South Africa since they won 27–22 in 2000.

== See also ==
- 2018 mid-year rugby union internationals
- History of rugby union matches between England and South Africa
