= Nick Isiekwe =

England international rugby union player

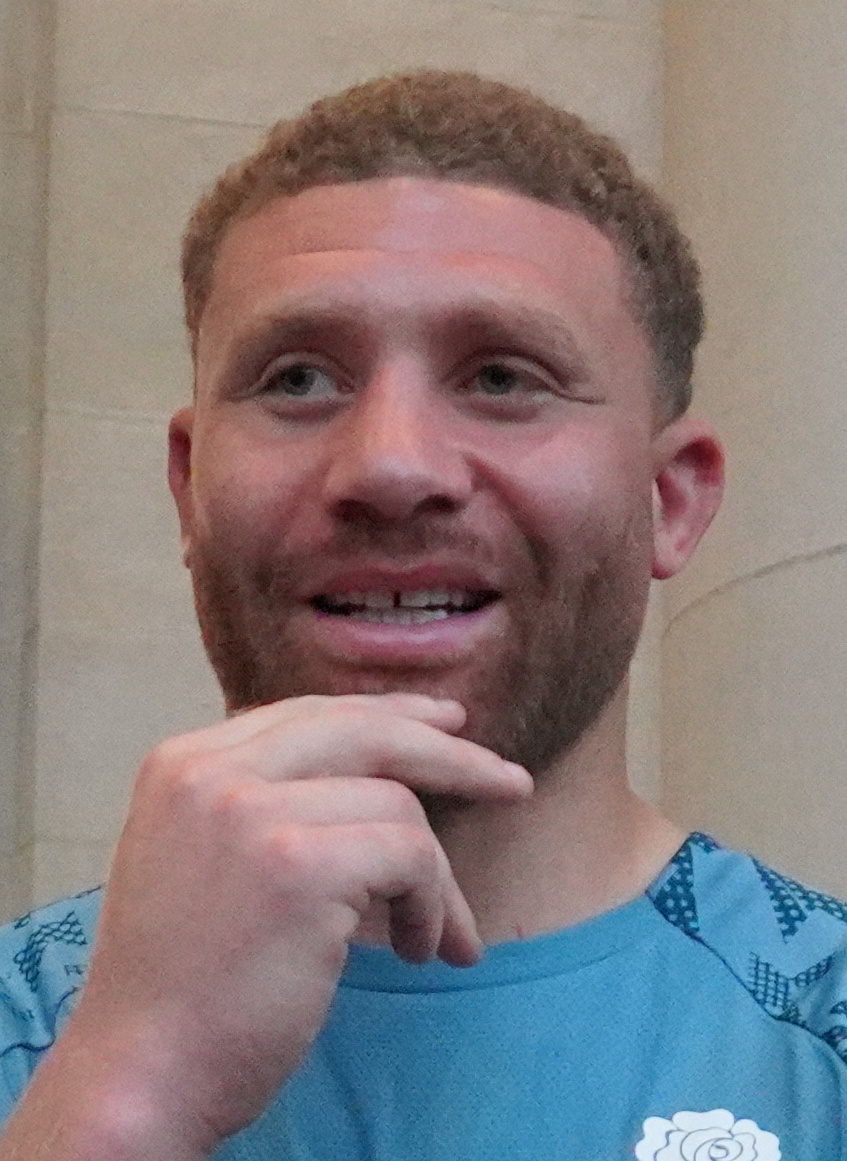
- Isiekwe in 2025
- Full name: Nicholas Akamonye Isiekwe
- Born: 20 April 1998 (age 28) Hemel Hempstead, England
- Height: 2.01 m (6 ft 7 in)
- Weight: 120 kg (265 lb; 18 st 13 lb)
- School: Nicholas Breakspear School; Haileybury and Imperial Service College

Rugby union career
- Position(s): Lock, Flanker
- Current team: Saracens
Senior career
Years	Team	Apps	(Points)
2016–	Saracens	156	(25)
2019–2021	→ Northampton Saints (loan)	22	(15)
- Correct as of 31 May 2025
International career
Years	Team	Apps	(Points)
2015–2016	England U18	9	(0)
2017	England U20	4	(0)
2017–	England	15	(0)
- Correct as of 24 November 2024

Nicholas Akamonye Isiekwe (born 20 April 1998) is an English professional rugby union player who plays as a lock for Premiership Rugby club Saracens and the England national team.

== Early life ==
Isiekwe was born in Hemel Hempstead.

Isiekwe first played rugby union at the age of six, playing touch rugby for Old Verulamians after being encouraged by his mother Ruth to take up a sport. At the age of thirteen, he played for Old Albanian RFC and went through the junior ranks at the club.

== Club career ==
Isiekwe, a member of the Saracens Academy structure, was trialed at many positions including prop, Number 8, flanker and centre, but his six-foot six stature saw him physically outgrow his original positions and moved to second row. This positional change saw him gain two appearances for the Saracens senior side during the 2016–17 Premiership campaign.

In May 2018, Isiekwe started in the final of 2017–18 Premiership Rugby season as Saracens defeated Exeter Chiefs to win the competition. The following season he was a member of the side that completed a league and European double; coming off the bench as a replacement for Will Skelton in the 2019 European Rugby Champions Cup final which saw Saracens defeat Leinster at St James' Park to become European champions and subsequently featuring in the victory over Exeter to retain their league title.

In May 2020, it was announced that Isiekwe had signed a new deal that would see him remain at Saracens until 2024. After Saracens were relegated to the RFU Championship for the 2020-21 campaign, it was confirmed that he would further develop his career in the Premiership by spending a season on loan at Northampton Saints. In his first season back at Saracens, he started in the Premiership final defeat to Leicester Tigers.

Isiekwe helped Saracens win the Premiership title in 2023, starting in the final as Saracens defeated Sale Sharks.

== International career ==
At the age of fifteen, Isiekwe represented London and South East U16's district in 2014, which quickly saw him gain his first age-grade international call-up; playing for England under 16's against Wales and Scotland. He made a quick climb in the national age-grade set-up, representing England under 17's in 2015 and making three appearances at the 2015 European Under-18 Championship in France. He was a member of the England under-20 team that completed a grand slam during the 2017 Six Nations Under 20s Championship.

On 20 April 2017, Isiekwe received his first call-up by coach Eddie Jones for the senior England team to join their summer tour of South America. On 10 June 2017 he made his senior debut as a second-half substitute for Charlie Ewels in the opening test against Argentina. He was an unused substitute in the next match as England completed a series victory.

Isiekwe was included in the squad for their 2018 tour of South Africa. He made his first start for England in the opening test defeat against South Africa at Ellis Park however he was substituted in the first half. Isiekwe did not feature at international level again for four years until he was recalled for the 2022 Six Nations Championship. He was also a member of their 2022 tour of Australia featuring off the bench in the final test victory at Sydney Cricket Ground to win the series.

== Honours ==
Saracens

- 1× European Rugby Champions Cup: 2018–19
- 3× Premiership Rugby: 2017–18, 2018–19, 2022–23
