= 2017 England rugby union tour of Argentina =

- Coach: Eddie Jones
- Tour captain: Dylan Hartley
Summary
P	W	D	L
Total
2	2	0	0
Test match
2	2	0	0
Opponent
P	W	D	L
Argentina
2	2	0	0

Tour chronology
- ← Australia 2016 South Africa 2018 →

In June 2017, England played a two-test series against Argentina as part of the 2017 mid-year rugby union tests. The series was part of the fifth year of the global rugby calendar established by the International Rugby Board, which runs through to 2019.

== Fixtures ==
Date	Venue	Home	Score	Away
10 June 2017	Estadio San Juan del Bicentenario, San Juan	Argentina	34–38	England
17 June 2017	Estadio B.G. Estanislao López, Santa Fe	Argentina	25–35	England

== Squads ==
Note: Ages, caps and clubs are as per 10 June, the first test match of the tour.

=== England ===
On 20 April, head coach Eddie Jones named a 30-man squad for England's two-test series against Argentina. Piers Francis and Sam Underhill, although playing outside England, were listed as both players are signed with an English club for the 2017/18 season.

On 21 May, James Haskell withdrew from the squad after being called up to the British and Irish Lions as an injury replacement.

On 29 May, Jones finalized England's touring squad for the series against Argentina. Nick Schonert, Mark Wilson and Marland Yarde were promoted from the additional players added to the squad for the XV side to play the Barbarians, while Don Armand and Ollie Devoto joined following the Aviva premiership final. Luke Cowan-Dickie, Paul Hill, Tom Wood and Joe Marchant withdrew from the squad.

Coaching team:

- Head coach: (Australia) Eddie Jones
- Defence coach: (England) Paul Gustard
- Attack/Skills coach: (Australia) Glen Ella

Player	Position	Date of birth (age)	Caps	Club/province
Luke Cowan-Dickie	Hooker	20 June 1993 (aged 23)	4	(England) Exeter Chiefs
Dylan Hartley (c)	Hooker	24 March 1986 (aged 31)	84	(England) Northampton Saints
Tommy Taylor	Hooker	11 November 1991 (aged 25)	1	(England) Wasps
Will Collier	Prop	5 May 1991 (aged 26)	0	(England) Harlequins
Ellis Genge	Prop	16 February 1995 (aged 22)	1	(England) Leicester Tigers
Paul Hill	Prop	2 March 1995 (aged 22)	5	(England) Northampton Saints
Matt Mullan	Prop	23 February 1987 (aged 30)	15	(England) Wasps
Nick Schonert	Prop	20 September 1991 (aged 25)	0	(England) Worcester Warriors
Harry Williams	Prop	1 October 1991 (aged 25)	0	(England) Exeter Chiefs
Don Armand	Flanker	23 September 1988 (aged 28)	0	(England) Exeter Chiefs
Charlie Ewels	Lock	29 June 1995 (aged 21)	3	(England) Bath
Nick Isiekwe	Lock	20 April 1998 (aged 19)	0	(England) Saracens
Joe Launchbury	Lock	12 April 1991 (aged 26)	42	(England) Wasps
Ben Curry	Flanker	15 June 1998 (aged 18)	0	(England) Sale Sharks
Tom Curry	Flanker	15 June 1998 (aged 18)	0	(England) Sale Sharks
James Haskell	Flanker	2 April 1985 (aged 32)	75	(England) Wasps
Chris Robshaw	Flanker	4 June 1986 (aged 31)	55	(England) Harlequins
Sam Underhill	Flanker	22 July 1996 (aged 20)	0	(Wales) Ospreys
Mark Wilson	Flanker	6 October 1989 (aged 27)	0	(England) Newcastle Falcons
Tom Wood	Flanker	3 November 1986 (aged 30)	50	(England) Northampton Saints
Nathan Hughes	Number 8	10 June 1991 (aged 26)	8	(England) Wasps
Danny Care	Scrum-half	2 January 1987 (aged 30)	71	(England) Harlequins
Jack Maunder	Scrum-half	5 April 1997 (aged 20)	0	(England) Exeter Chiefs
George Ford	Fly-half	16 March 1993 (aged 24)	35	(England) Bath
Piers Francis	Fly-half	20 June 1990 (aged 26)	0	(New Zealand) Blues
Alex Lozowski	Fly-half	30 June 1993 (aged 23)	0	(England) Saracens
Ollie Devoto	Centre	22 September 1993 (aged 23)	1	(England) Exeter Chiefs
Sam James	Centre	3 July 1994 (aged 22)	0	(England) Sale Sharks
Harry Mallinder	Centre	13 June 1996 (aged 20)	0	(England) Northampton Saints
Joe Marchant	Centre	16 July 1996 (aged 20)	0	(England) Harlequins
Henry Slade	Centre	19 March 1993 (aged 24)	5	(England) Exeter Chiefs
Joe Cokanasiga	Wing	14 October 1997 (aged 19)	0	(England) London Irish
Nathan Earle	Wing	24 September 1994 (aged 22)	0	(England) Saracens
Jonny May	Wing	1 April 1990 (aged 27)	25	(England) Gloucester Rugby
Denny Solomona	Wing	27 September 1993 (aged 23)	0	(England) Sale Sharks
Marland Yarde	Wing	20 April 1992 (aged 25)	11	(England) Harlequins
Mike Brown	Fullback	4 September 1985 (aged 31)	60	(England) Harlequins

On 21 May, several players were subsequently called up by Jones for the Barbarians game due to the Aviva Premiership final between Wasps and Exeter Chiefs.

Note: Ages, caps and clubs are as per 28 May, the day England played the Barbarians.

Player	Position	Date of birth (age)	Caps	Club/province
Rob Buchanan	Hooker	13 May 1991 (aged 26)	0	(England) Harlequins
Jack Singleton	Hooker	14 May 1996 (aged 21)	0	(England) Worcester Warriors
Jamal Ford-Robinson	Prop	11 September 1993 (aged 23)	0	(England) Bristol
Ross Harrison	Prop	3 September 1992 (aged 24)	0	(England) Sale Sharks
Will Spencer	Lock	30 May 1992 (aged 24)	0	(England) Worcester Warriors
Tom Ellis	Flanker	29 September 1994 (aged 22)	0	(England) Bath
Josh Beaumont	Number 8	24 March 1993 (aged 24)	0	(England) Sale Sharks
Richard Wigglesworth	Scrum-half	9 June 1983 (aged 33)	27	(England) Saracens
Ryan Mills	Centre	30 May 1992 (aged 24)	0	(England) Worcester Warriors
Mike Haley	Fullback	28 June 1994 (aged 22)	0	(England) Sale Sharks

=== Argentina ===
On 29 May, Argentina named a 32-man squad for their two-test series against England and the one-off test match against Georgia.

Coaching team:

- Head coach: (Argentina) Daniel Hourcade
- Defence coach: (Argentina) Pablo Bouza
- Backs coach: (Argentina) Germán Fernández
- Forwards coach: (Argentina) Emiliano Bergamaschi

Player	Position	Date of birth (age)	Caps	Club/province
Agustín Creevy (c)	Hooker	15 March 1985 (aged 32)	59	Jaguares
Julián Montoya	Hooker	29 October 1993 (aged 23)	29	Jaguares
Felipe Arregui	Prop	9 June 1994 (aged 23)	2	Jaguares
Santiago García Botta	Prop	19 June 1992 (aged 24)	14	Jaguares
Ramiro Herrera	Prop	14 February 1989 (aged 28)	32	Jaguares
Lucas Noguera Paz	Prop	5 October 1993 (aged 23)	31	Jaguares
Enrique Pieretto	Prop	15 December 1994 (aged 22)	12	Jaguares
Nahuel Tetaz Chaparro	Prop	11 June 1989 (aged 27)	30	Jaguares
Matías Alemanno	Lock	5 December 1991 (aged 25)	31	Jaguares
Tomás Lavanini	Lock	22 January 1993 (aged 24)	30	Jaguares
Guido Petti	Lock	17 November 1994 (aged 22)	24	Jaguares
Rodrigo Báez	Flanker	8 February 1989 (aged 28)	16	Jaguares
Juan Manuel Leguizamón	Flanker	6 June 1983 (aged 34)	75	Jaguares
Tomás Lezana	Flanker	16 February 1994 (aged 23)	11	Jaguares
Pablo Matera	Flanker	18 July 1993 (aged 23)	34	Jaguares
Javier Ortega Desio	Flanker	14 June 1990 (aged 26)	32	Jaguares
Benjamín Macome	Number 8	10 January 1986 (aged 31)	23	Jaguares
Leonardo Senatore	Number 8	13 May 1984 (aged 33)	44	Jaguares
Gonzalo Bertranou	Scrum-half	31 December 1993 (aged 23)	2	Jaguares
Felipe Ezcurra	Scrum-half	15 April 1993 (aged 24)	3	Jaguares
Martín Landajo	Scrum-half	14 June 1988 (aged 28)	66	Jaguares
Santiago González Iglesias	Fly-half	16 June 1988 (aged 28)	31	Jaguares
Nicolás Sánchez	Fly-half	26 October 1988 (aged 28)	50	Jaguares
Jerónimo de la Fuente	Centre	24 February 1991 (aged 26)	27	Jaguares
Juan Martín Hernández	Centre	7 August 1982 (aged 34)	66	Jaguares
Matías Moroni	Centre	29 March 1991 (aged 26)	19	Jaguares
Matías Orlando	Centre	14 November 1991 (aged 25)	21	Jaguares
Emiliano Boffelli	Wing	16 January 1995 (aged 22)	0	Jaguares
Santiago Cordero	Wing	6 December 1993 (aged 23)	30	Jaguares
Manuel Montero	Wing	20 November 1991 (aged 25)	26	Jaguares
Ramiro Moyano	Fullback	28 May 1990 (aged 27)	12	Jaguares
Joaquín Tuculet	Fullback	8 August 1989 (aged 27)	40	Jaguares

== Matches ==
=== Warm-up match ===
28 May 2017
15:00 BST (UTC+01)

England	28–14	Barbarians
Try: Earle 16' c Isiekwe 67' c Care 80' m Con: Ford (2/3) 17', 68'; Pen: Ford (3/4) 30', 40', 47'	Report	Try: Ashley-Cooper 42' c Tekori 76' c Con: Madigan (2/2) 44', 76'

Twickenham Stadium, London
Attendance: 51,636
Referee: Andrew Brace (Ireland)

Team details

FB	15	Mike Brown	(substituted off) 29'	(substituted on) 36'
RW	14	Nathan Earle			(substituted off) 72'
OC	13	Sam James
IC	12	Alex Lozowski	(substituted off) 14'
LW	11	Jonny May
FH	10	George Ford (c)
SH	9	Danny Care
N8	8	Josh Beaumont	(substituted off) 47'
OF	7	Sam Underhill	(substituted off) 36'
BF	6	Chris Robshaw (c)
RL	5	Nick Isiekwe	(substituted off) 68'
LL	4	Charlie Ewels
TP	3	Will Collier	(substituted off) 64'
HK	2	Jack Singleton	(substituted off) 61'
LP	1	Ellis Genge	(substituted off) 68'
Replacements:
HK	16	George McGuigan	(substituted on) 61'
PR	17	Ross Harrison	(substituted on) 68'
PR	18	Jamal Ford-Robinson	(substituted on) 64'
LK	19	Will Spencer	(substituted on) 68'
FL	20	Tom Curry	(substituted on) 36'
FL	21	Mark Wilson	(substituted on) 47'
SH	22	Richard Wigglesworth	(substituted on) 29'	(substituted off) 36'	(substituted on) 72'
FB	23	Mike Haley	(substituted on) 14'
Coach:
(Australia) Eddie Jones

FB	15	(England) Alex Goode
RW	14	(Fiji) Timoci Nagusa
OC	13	(France) Yann David		(substituted off) 20'
IC	12	(South Africa) François Steyn
LW	11	(Australia) Adam Ashley-Cooper		(substituted off) 65'
FH	10	(Ireland) Ian Madigan
SH	9	(Samoa) Kahn Fotuali'i		(substituted off) 65'
N8	8	(Argentina) Facundo Isa		(substituted off) 65'
OF	7	(England) Steffon Armitage		(substituted off) 56'	(substituted on) 65'
BF	6	(France) Thierry Dusautoir (c)
RL	5	(New Zealand) Jeremy Thrush
LL	4	(Argentina) Patricio Albacete		(substituted off) 45'
TP	3	(Samoa) Census Johnston		(substituted off) 52'
HK	2	(Wales) Richard Hibbard		(substituted off) 45'
LP	1	(Georgia (country)) Mikheil Nariashvili	(yellow card) 55' to 65'		(substituted off) 65'
Replacements:
HK	16	(South Africa) Schalk Brits		(substituted on) 45'
PR	17	(New Zealand) Chris King		(substituted on) 56'
PR	18	(Scotland) WP Nel		(substituted on) 52'
LK	19	(Samoa) Joe Tekori		(substituted on) 45'
N8	20	(France) Gillian Galan		(substituted on) 65'
SH	21	(South Africa) Ruan Pienaar		(substituted on) 65'
CE	22	(New Zealand) Robbie Fruean		(substituted on) 20'
WG	23	(Argentina) Horacio Agulla		(substituted on) 65'
Coach:
(New Zealand) Vern Cotter

Man of the Match:
Tom Curry (England)

Touch judges:
John Lacey (Ireland)
Ben Whitehouse (Wales)
Television match official:
Peter Fitzgibbon (Australia)

=== First test ===
10 June 2017
16:15 ART (UTC-03)

Argentina	34–38	England
Try: Boffelli 7' c Lavanini 36' c De la Fuente 50' c Tuculet 52' c Con: Sánchez (4/4) 8', 37', 51', 54'; Pen: Sánchez (1/3) 40'; Drop: Hernández (1/1) 76'	Report	Try: Yarde 30' c May 46' c Ford 64' m Solomona 78' c Con: Ford (3/4) 32', 48', 78'; Pen: Ford (4/4) 16', 26', 42', 62'

Estadio Bicentenario, San Juan
Attendance: 23,000
Referee: Nigel Owens (Wales)

Team details

Argentina
England

FB	15	Joaquín Tuculet
RW	14	Matías Moroni
OC	13	Matías Orlando
IC	12	Jerónimo de la Fuente
LW	11	Emiliano Boffelli	(substituted off) 61'
FH	10	Nicolás Sánchez	(substituted off) 61'
SH	9	Martín Landajo	(substituted off) 68'
N8	8	Juan Manuel Leguizamón	(substituted off) 57'
OF	7	Javier Ortega Desio
BF	6	Pablo Matera
RL	5	Tomás Lavanini	(substituted off) 47'
LL	4	Matías Alemanno
TP	3	Enrique Pieretto	(substituted off) 54'
HK	2	Agustín Creevy (c)	(substituted off) 47'
LP	1	Lucas Noguera Paz	(substituted off) 69'
Replacements:
HK	16	Julián Montoya	(substituted on) 47'
PR	17	Santiago García Botta	(substituted on) 69'
PR	18	Nahuel Tetaz Chaparro	(substituted on) 54'
LK	19	Guido Petti	(substituted on) 47'
N8	20	Leonardo Senatore	(substituted on) 57'
SH	21	Gonzalo Bertranou	(substituted on) 68'
CE	22	Juan Martín Hernández	(substituted on) 61'
WG	23	Ramiro Moyano	(substituted on) 61'
Coach:
(Argentina) Daniel Hourcade

FB	15	Mike Brown
RW	14	Marland Yarde	(substituted off) 50'
OC	13	Henry Slade
IC	12	Alex Lozowski	(substituted off) 54'
LW	11	Jonny May
FH	10	George Ford
SH	9	Danny Care	(substituted off) 77'
N8	8	Nathan Hughes
OF	7	Tom Curry	(substituted off) 70'
BF	6	Mark Wilson
RL	5	Charlie Ewels	(substituted off) 76'
LL	4	Joe Launchbury
TP	3	Harry Williams	(substituted off) 61'
HK	2	Dylan Hartley (c)
LP	1	Ellis Genge	(substituted off) 54'
Replacements:
HK	16	Jack Singleton
PR	17	Matt Mullan	(substituted on) 54'
PR	18	Will Collier	(substituted on) 61'
LK	19	Nick Isiekwe	(substituted on) 76'
FL	20	Don Armand	(substituted on) 70'
SH	21	Jack Maunder	(substituted on) 77'
FH	22	Piers Francis	(substituted on) 54'
WG	23	Denny Solomona	(substituted on) 50'
Coach:
(Australia) Eddie Jones

Man of the Match:
George Ford (England)

Touch judges:
John Lacey (Ireland)
Egon Seconds (South Africa)
Television match official:
Aaron Paterson (New Zealand)

Notes:

- Emiliano Boffelli (Argentina) and Don Armand, Will Collier, Tom Curry, Piers Francis, Nick Isiekwe, Alex Lozowski, Jack Maunder, Denny Solomona, Harry Williams and Mark Wilson (all England) made their international debuts.

=== Second test ===
17 June 2017
16:15 ART (UTC-03)

Argentina	25–35	England
Try: Tuculet 8' c Matera 52' m Boffelli 59' c Con: Sánchez (2/3) 10', 60'; Pen: Sánchez (2/4) 15', 19'	Report	Try: Ewels 5' c Francis 31' m Care 56' c Collier 65' c Con: Ford (3/4) 6', 57', 66'; Pen: Ford (2/2) 11', 29'; Drop: Ford (1/1) 74'

Estadio Brigadier General Estanislao López, Santa Fe
Attendance: 29,750
Referee: John Lacey (Ireland)

Team details

Argentina
England

FB	15	Joaquín Tuculet
RW	14	Ramiro Moyano
OC	13	Matías Orlando
IC	12	Jerónimo de la Fuente
LW	11	Emiliano Boffelli	(substituted off) 74'
FH	10	Nicolás Sánchez	(substituted off) 62'
SH	9	Martín Landajo	(substituted off) 74'
N8	8	Juan Manuel Leguizamón
OF	7	Javier Ortega Desio
BF	6	Pablo Matera	(substituted off) 55'
RL	5	Tomás Lavanini
LL	4	Matías Alemanno	(substituted off) 47'
TP	3	Enrique Pieretto	(substituted off) 50'
HK	2	Agustín Creevy (c)	(substituted off) 60'
LP	1	Lucas Noguera Paz	(substituted off) 47'
Replacements:
HK	16	Julián Montoya	(substituted on) 60'
PR	17	Nahuel Tetaz Chaparro	(substituted on) 47'
PR	18	Ramiro Herrera	(substituted on) 50'
LK	19	Guido Petti	(substituted on) 47'
FL	20	Tomás Lezana	(substituted on) 55'
SH	21	Gonzalo Bertranou	(substituted on) 74'
CE	22	Juan Martín Hernández	(substituted on) 62'
WG	23	Matías Moroni	(substituted on) 74'
Coach:
(Argentina) Daniel Hourcade

FB	15	Mike Brown
RW	14	Marland Yarde	(substituted off) 66'
OC	13	Henry Slade
IC	12	Piers Francis	(substituted off) 66'
LW	11	Jonny May
FH	10	George Ford
SH	9	Danny Care
N8	8	Nathan Hughes
OF	7	Sam Underhill	(substituted off) 60'
BF	6	Chris Robshaw
RL	5	Charlie Ewels
LL	4	Joe Launchbury
TP	3	Harry Williams	(substituted off) 60'
HK	2	Dylan Hartley (c)
LP	1	Ellis Genge	(substituted off) 53'
Replacements:
HK	16	Jack Singleton
PR	17	Matt Mullan	(substituted on) 53'
PR	18	Will Collier	(substituted on) 60'
LK	19	Nick Isiekwe
FL	20	Mark Wilson	(substituted on) 60'
SH	21	Jack Maunder
CE	22	Alex Lozowski	(substituted on) 66'
WG	23	Denny Solomona	(substituted on) 66'
Coach:
(Australia) Eddie Jones

Man of the Match:
George Ford (England)

Touch judges:
Nigel Owens (Wales)
Egon Seconds (South Africa)
Television match official:
Aaron Paterson (New Zealand)

Notes:

- Sam Underhill (England) made his international debut.

== See also ==
- 2017 mid-year rugby union internationals
- History of rugby union matches between Argentina and England
