= Schonert =

Schonert is a surname. Notable people with the surname include:

- Nick Schonert (born 1991), South African rugby union player
- Turk Schonert (1957–2019), American football player
