= Jack Maunder =

England international rugby union player

- Full name: Jack Andrew L. Maunder
- Born: 5 April 1997 (age 29) Exeter, Devon, England
- Height: 180 cm (5 ft 11 in)
- Weight: 85 kg (187 lb)
- School: Blundell's School
- University: University of Exeter
- Notable relative: Sam Maunder (brother)

Rugby union career
- Position: Scrum-half
Youth career
- –2010: Cullompton
- 2010–2016: Exeter Chiefs Academy
Amateur team(s)
Years	Team	Apps	(Points)
–2016	Plymouth Albion		
Senior career
Years	Team	Apps	(Points)
2016–2023	Exeter Chiefs	141	(60)
- Correct as of 26 March 2023
Super Rugby
Years	Team	Apps	(Points)
2024	Melbourne Rebels	6	(0)
International career
Years	Team	Apps	(Points)
2015	England U18	2	(0)
2016–2017	England U20	1	(0)
2017	England	1	(0)
- Correct as of 10 June 2017

Jack Andrew L. Maunder (born 5 April 1997) is an English rugby union Scrum-half. He currently plays for SU Agen Lot-et-Garonne in French Pro D2 league.

Since making his professional debut for his home-town club of Exeter Chiefs, in the English Premiership, he has played over 140 matches for the team. Maunder previously played for the Australian Super Rugby team, the Melbourne Rebels.

== Early life and career ==
Maunder was born in the Devon city of Exeter in 1997. Maunder's first club was Cullompton RFC, where he played until he attended the Blundell's School in Mid Devon. Maunder later came under the Exeter Chiefs Academy before also playing for Plymouth Albion.

=== Exeter Chiefs ===
In October 2016, Maunder made his club debut for the Exeter Chiefs against ASM Clermont Auvergne in the pool stage of the Champions Cup. On 19 March 2017, Maunder started for Exeter in the final of the Anglo-Welsh Cup, losing to the Leicester Tigers.

Maunder was a key part of the Exeter Chiefs Premiership winning season playing thirteen games and starting five throughout the season in his breakthrough year.

While playing for the Chiefs throughout there successful 2019–20 season, Maunder was attending the University of Exeter.

=== Melbourne Rebels ===
In early July 2023, after Maunder was out-of-contract, it was highly speculated that he would sign a deal with the Australian Super Rugby franchise, the Melbourne Rebels. Maunder signed for the 2024 season for the Melbourne Rebels later that month, one year after starting scrum-half Ryan Louwrens re-signed for the team. Maunder is the third scrum-half within the squad for 2024.

== International career ==
Maunder has represented England at U16 and U18 levels. He was named in the England U20 squad for their 2016 campaign but was unable to feature due to a fractured wrist. On 20 April 2017, Eddie Jones named Maunder in a 31-man squad for the summer tour of Argentina. Maunder made his debut in the first test against Argentina, coming on for Danny Care in the 77th minute.

On 3 August 2017, Maunder was selected for Eddie Jones' pre-season England training squad. The Chief was selected after his successful tour with England in Argentina over the summer of 2017.
