= Jack Singleton =

England international rugby union player

- Born: Jack Howard Singleton; 14 May 1996 (age 30) Dacorum, Hertfordshire, England
- Height: 1.80 m (5 ft 11 in)
- Weight: 109 kg (17.2 st; 240 lb)
- School: St George's School, Harpenden

Rugby union career
- Position: Hooker
Senior career
Years	Team	Apps	(Points)
2014–2019	Worcester Warriors	65	(25)
2019–2020	Saracens	15	(10)
2020–2026	Gloucester	75	(100)
2023–2024	Toulon (loan)	21	(5)
2026–	Glasgow Warriors	1	(5)
International career
Years	Team	Apps	(Points)
2016	England U20	10	(35)
2017–2022	England A	2	(0)
2017–2022	England	4	(0)
- Correct as of 5 Dec 2025

Jack Singleton (born 14 May 1996) is an English professional rugby union player who plays at hooker for United Rugby Championship club Glasgow Warriors. A four-time England international, he has also played for Worcester, Saracens, Gloucester and Toulon.

== Club career ==
=== Worcester Warriors and Saracens ===
Singleton came through the Saracens Academy prior to joining Worcester Warriors in 2014. In October 2016 he made his professional debut for Worcester away in Russia against Enisei-STM in the EPCR Challenge Cup. In what proved to be a markedly good first professional season at Worcester, Singleton made twenty appearances. His Premiership debut came against Northampton Saints in November 2016. Singleton's good form as a young player, saw him collect a 'Club's Young Player of the Season' award for the 2016–2017 campaign. After five years at Worcester, Singleton returned to Saracens in 2019.

=== Gloucester and Toulon ===
On 11 March 2020, Singleton joined Gloucester on a season-long loan deal for the 2020–21 season after Saracens were relegated to the RFU Championship due to salary cap breaches. It was later confirmed he would remain at Gloucester permanently from the 2021–22 season.

On 29 November 2023, Singleton joined French giants Toulon in the Top 14 on loan for the remainder of the 2023–24 season. This gave Singleton more game time as he was recovering from a serious knee injury. He returned to Gloucester for the 2024–25 season.

After making only one appearance in the 2025–26 season after he suffered a cardiovascular event during training in September 2025, he was subsequently released by Gloucester after making a full recovery.

=== Glasgow Warriors ===
In October 2026, he signed a short-term deal with United Rugby Championship side Glasgow Warriors.

He made his competitive United Rugby Championship debut against the Lions at Scotstoun Stadium on 30 October 2026, playing from the start. The Warriors won the match with a bonus point win, in a 29 points to 20 points victory, with Singleton scoring a try. He became Glasgow Warrior No. 384.

== International career ==
Singleton scored four tries in a game against Italy in the 2016 Six Nations Under 20s Championship. He was selected for the 2016 World Rugby Under 20 Championship and scored tries in pool matches against Italy and Scotland. He started in the final as England defeated Ireland to become junior world champions.

In May 2017 Singleton received his first call-up to the senior England squad by coach Eddie Jones and started in a non-cap game against the Barbarians. He was a member of the squad on their tour of Argentina but remained on the bench for both tests. He was also called up as injury cover during their 2018 tour of South Africa but did not participate in the series.

On 11 August 2019, Singleton won his first cap for England off the bench against Wales at Twickenham in a warm-up match and the next day his selection for the 2019 Rugby World Cup was confirmed. His only appearance at the tournament came as a replacement for Luke Cowan-Dickie during a pool stage fixture against the United States.

Singleton was called up to the England squad on 15 November 2021 as cover for the injured Jamie George for the game against South Africa during the 2021 Autumn Nations Series.

== Personal life ==
In September 2025, Singleton suffered a cardiac event and was stood down from rugby for an extended period of time.

He is internationally eligible for England by birth and for Scotland through his grandmother.

== Honours ==
- Rugby World Cup / Webb Ellis Cup
  - Runner up: 2019
