= Kyle Sinckler =

British Lions & England international rugby union player

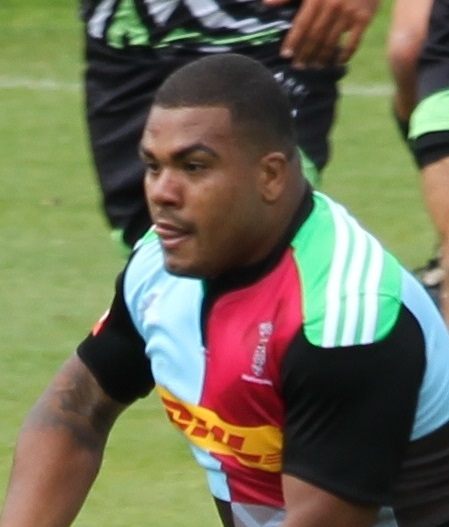
- Sinckler with Harlequins in 2014
- Full name: Kyle Norval Jonathan Nikolas Sean Sinckler
- Born: 30 March 1993 (age 33) Wandsworth, England
- Height: 1.82 m (6 ft 0 in)
- Weight: 122 kg (269 lb; 19 st 3 lb)
- School: Graveney School and Epsom College

Rugby union career
- Position: Prop
- Current team: Toulon
Senior career
Years	Team	Apps	(Points)
2011–2020	Harlequins	145	(45)
2020–2024	Bristol Bears	45	(5)
2024–	Toulon	24	(10)
- Correct as of 12 January 2025
International career
Years	Team	Apps	(Points)
2009–2010	England U18	16	(10)
2012–2013	England U20	13	(10)
2016–	England	68	(20)
2017–2021	British & Irish Lions	6	(0)
- Correct as of 21 October 2023

Kyle Norval Jonathan Sean Sinckler (born 30 March 1993) is an English professional rugby union player who plays as a prop for Top 14 club Toulon.

A graduate of the Harlequins Academy, Sinckler made his brief debut in the 2011–12 season, before going out on loan to Richmond for the entire season, becoming part of the squad that won promotion to the National League 1. He returned to Harlequins for the 2012–13 season as a primary squad rotation player; a brief loan to Ealing followed in the following league campaign, before breaking into the first team squad.

Sinckler has represented England at under-16, under-18, under-19 and under-20 levels, and has been a crucial member of the senior team since 2016, in which he has won the Six Nations Championship, the Calcutta Cup and the Millennium Trophy. Sinckler's performances for England led to him being included in Warren Gatland's squad for the British & Irish Lions' tour to New Zealand in 2017. In 2019, he was a member of the England squad that finished as runners-up to South Africa at the Rugby World Cup in Japan. He was substituted due to a head injury in the third minute of the final, having been accidentally elbowed by Maro Itoje as they both made a tackle.

== Early life ==
Sinckler was born in Wandsworth, London, and grew up in Merton. He began playing rugby from the age of eight. Sinckler says that it was his mother, Donna, who instigated his rugby career. According to Sinckler, he was a keen footballer though his physical nature resulted in him dropping the sport. His mother took him to local rugby union side Battersea Ironsides in Earlsfield. Sinckler attended Graveney School and Epsom College.

== Club career ==
=== Harlequins ===
Sinckler began his Harlequins career when Academy coach Collin Osborne saw him, aged 12, playing at one of his various positions, this time full back, against King's College School OB, Wimbledon, where his talent was immediately spotted.

Sinckler graduated from the Harlequins Academy squad after playing his first game for the club in their 42–6 thrashing over Gloucester in round 2 of the 2011–12 Premiership although he only appeared for the last 5 minutes of the game. Sinckler only went on to play one more game for Harlequins in that same season, coming off the bench against Sale Sharks during their 37–25 victory in the 2011–12 LV Cup. During this season, Sinckler was sent to Richmond on loan, where he helped them earn promotion to National League 1.

Sinckler then spent the whole of the following season playing at Harlequins where he made seven appearances, all of which were from the bench. He played in various competitions, and made his Heineken Cup debut against Zebre which Harlequins went on to win 53–5. Sinckler highly contributed to their 2012–13 LV Cup winning campaign, playing in four out of the six games, including the semi-final against Bath.

Sinckler was sent on loan to Ealing Trailfinders at the beginning of the 2013–14 season; though intended to be for the entire league campaign, he was recalled by Harlequins. Sinckler made his way into the Harlequins match-day team, when Paul Doran-Jones sustained an injury early on in the season. He made his first appearance for the season during a 37–13 victory over Worcester Warriors. However, Sinckler did have to wait until mid-February to gain his first start for the team, which occurred in a 25–20 defeat to Gloucester. A week later, Sinckler went on to play his first full game for the club, which Harlequins narrowly defeated Worcester 21–20. Sinckler went on to start in their Premiership semi-final play-off tie against Saracens, which resulted in a 31–17 defeat. In May 2016, Sinckler was a member of the side that lost to Montpellier in the final of the European Rugby Challenge Cup.

=== Bristol Bears ===
On 27 January 2020, it was confirmed that Sinckler would join fellow Premiership side Bristol Bears, signing onto a two-year deal. It was agreed that Sinckler would remain at Harlequins for the remainder of the 2019–20 season, officially joining Bristol during the summer. On 16 October 2020 Sinckler started for the Bears side that defeated Toulon in the final of the EPCR Challenge Cup to win their first ever European trophy. Sinckler extended his contract with Bristol until the end of the 2023/24 season in October 2022.

=== Toulon ===
On 29 March 2024, Sinckler would end his England career as he signs for top French side Toulon in the Top 14 competition from the 2024-25 season.

== International career ==
=== Youth levels ===
Sinckler was named in the England under-20 Elite Player Squad ahead of the 2011–12 season. In his first season, he played ten times, across both the Six Nations Championship and 2012 IRB Junior World Championships. At the Junior World Championship in South Africa, Sinckler scored in pool stage victories against Italy and Ireland. He was reinstated into the squad for the 2012–13 season, playing in just three matches in the 2013 Junior Six Nations, due to his commitments with Harlequins.

=== England senior team ===
His form for Harlequins across the 2012–13 and 2013–14 seasons landed Sinckler a place in the England national side for the uncapped annual fixture against the Barbarians. He was named in the starting line-up for the "England XV", in a 39–29 defeat. After his performance against the Barbarians, Sinckler was picked over Will Collier to go on tour with the rest of the England squad.

Sinckler was called up to the senior England squad again by new head coach Eddie Jones, on 8 May 2016, for a three-day training squad. He made his debut for the Senior team on 12 November 2016, coming on for Dan Cole during the remaining 10 minutes against South Africa. Sinckler was a member of the side that retained their title during the 2017 Six Nations Championship, missing out on a grand slam with defeat in the last game of the tournament away to Ireland.

During the 2019 Six Nations Championship, Sinckler was referred to by Wales head coach Warren Gatland as an "emotional timebomb", because of some incidents that had occurred during his stint in the 2017 tour to New Zealand with the British & Irish Lions. In the match against Wales that followed, Sinckler gave away several penalties that proved critical to the match result, and was taken off in the 57th minute.

Despite his drop in form, Sinckler was later selected in England's squad for the 2019 Rugby World Cup. He was named in the starting line-up in all but one match, and scored his maiden test try in their quarter-final victory over Australia. The team's excellent form during their campaign saw them qualify for the final against South Africa; in the third minute, Sinckler made accidental contact with teammate Maro Itoje's elbow while attempting to tackle Makazole Mapimpi and was knocked out. After being helped on the field by the medical staff, he was helped off and ruled out for the rest of the match, in which they were defeated 32–12.

Sinckler was a member of the team that won the 2020 Six Nations Championship and later that year started for the side that defeated France in the final of the Autumn Nations Cup. He scored his second try at international level against Italy during the 2022 Six Nations and the next round against Wales saw him make his fiftieth appearance for England.

=== British & Irish Lions ===
On 19 April 2017, Sinckler was included in the list of players selected for the British & Irish Lions tour to New Zealand in June and July.

On 6 May 2021, Sinckler was left out of the squad to tour South Africa. On 6 June 2021, Sinckler was called up to the British & Irish Lions as a replacement for Andrew Porter due to injuries.

== Personal life ==
In July 2017, Sinckler was arrested in Central Auckland, during a night out with his teammates on the conclusion of the British & Irish Lions' tour to New Zealand. According to reports, Sinckler was involved in a "minor incident" whilst celebrating the Lions' 15–15 draw against New Zealand. He was placed under arrest though was not prosecuted; police officers escorted Sinckler back to his hotel shortly after the incident. Sinckler openly apologised for his actions. He has a dog called Brody.

== Career statistics ==
=== List of international tries ===
As of 25 February 2023

Try	Opposing team	Location	Venue	Competition	Date	Result	Score
1	Australia	Ōita, Japan	Ōita Bank Dome	2019 Rugby World Cup	19 October 2019	Win	40 – 16
2	Italy	Rome, Italy	Stadio Olimpico	2022 Six Nations	13 February 2022	Win	0 – 33
3	Wales	Cardiff, Wales	Millennium Stadium	2023 Six Nations	25 February 2023	Win	10 – 20
4	Ireland	Dublin, Ireland	Aviva Stadium	2023 Rugby World Cup warm-up matches	19 August 2023	Loss	29 – 10

== Honours ==
England

- 2× Six Nations Championship: 2017, 2020
- 1× Autumn Nations Cup: 2020
- 1× Rugby World Cup runner-up: 2019

Bristol

- 1× EPCR Challenge Cup: 2020

Harlequins

- 1× Anglo-Welsh Cup: 2013
- 1× EPCR Challenge Cup runner-up: 2016
