= Charlie Ewels =

English rugby union player (born 1995)

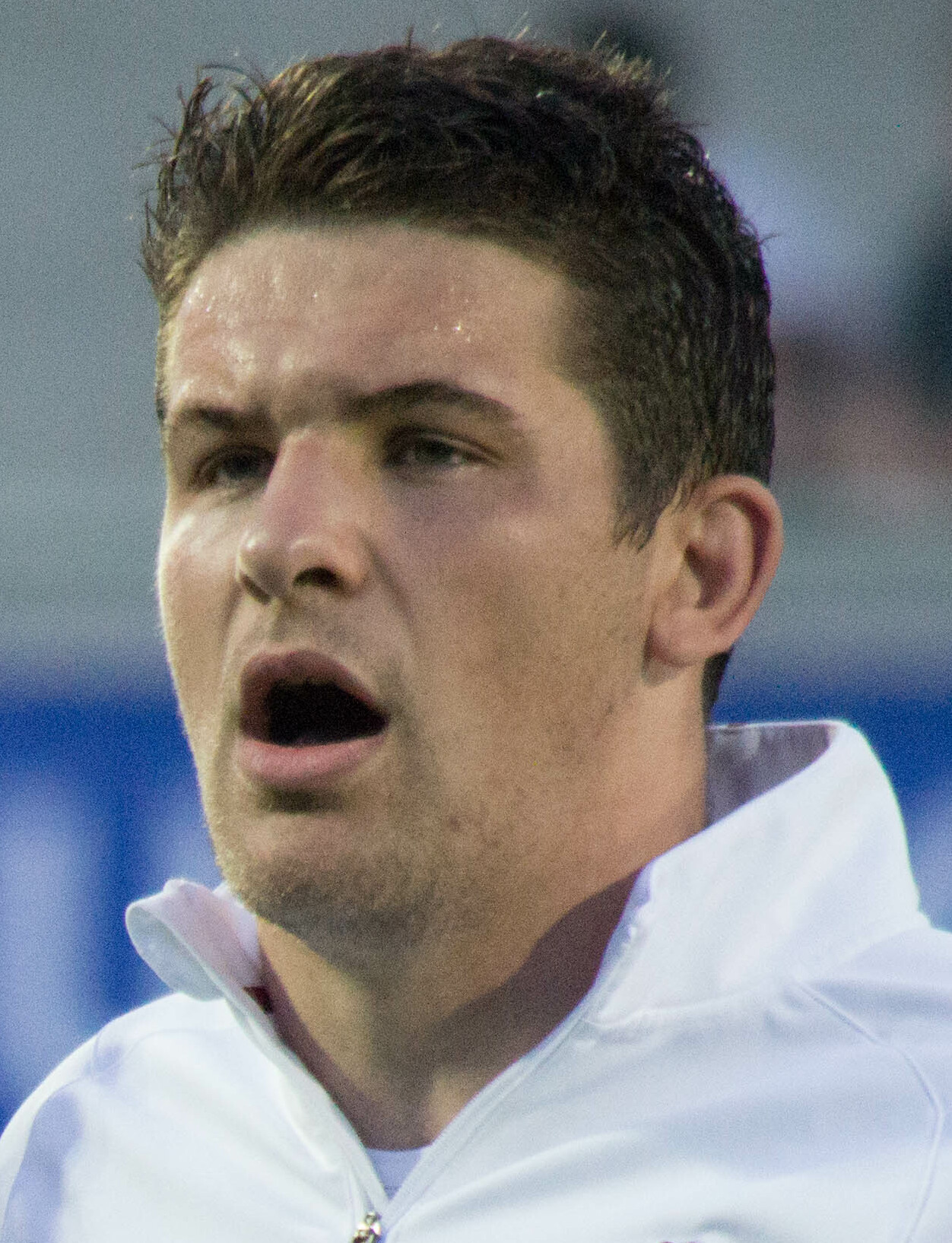
- Ewels in 2015
- Born: Charlie John Ewels; 29 June 1995 (age 31) Bournemouth, England
- Height: 1.97 m (6 ft 5 1/2 in)
- Weight: 112 kg (247 lb; 17 st 9 lb)
- School: Moordown St John's; Bournemouth School; Bryanston School

Rugby union career
- Position: Lock
Senior career
Years	Team	Apps	(Points)
2014–	Bath	202	(20)
2023	→ Blue Bulls	6	(0)
- Correct as of 3 August 2026
International career
Years	Team	Apps	(Points)
2014–2015	England U20	18	(0)
2016–	England	33	(10)
- Correct as of 12 July 2025

Charlie Ewels (born 29 June 1995) is an English professional rugby union player who plays at lock for Premiership club Bath.

== Early and personal life ==
Ewels grew up in Bournemouth, attending Moordown St John's in Bournemouth, Bournemouth School and Bryanston School in Dorset. Ewels started playing rugby at the age of seven and captained Bournemouth School to a number of local successes playing in a number 8 role, forming a 'formidable' partnership with speedster and playmaker Chris Speers.

== Club career ==
Ewels joined the Bath academy in 2009. In November 2014, he made his club debut against Glasgow Warriors in the European Rugby Champions Cup.

In March 2018, Ewels started for the Bath side that were defeated by Exeter Chiefs in the final of the Anglo-Welsh Cup. In September 2019 it was announced that Ewels was the new club captain at Bath.

On 20 April 2023, South African side Blue Bulls announced the signing of Ewels on a short-term loan from Bath until the end of the Currie Cup Premier Division campaign.

Ewels started in the 2024–25 EPCR Challenge Cup final as Bath beat Lyon at the Millennium Stadium to win their first European trophy for seventeen years. The following month, he started in the 2025 Premiership final which saw Bath beat Leicester Tigers to become champions of England for the first time since 1996.

== International career ==
In June 2014, Ewels was a member of the England under-20 team that won the 2014 IRB Junior World Championship. He partnered Maro Itoje in the second row as they beat South Africa in the final at Eden Park. The following year Ewels captained the side as they won the 2015 Six Nations and was also chosen to lead the side that finished runners up to New Zealand at the 2015 World Rugby Under 20 Championship.

In May 2016, Ewels received his first call up to the senior England squad by coach Eddie Jones for a three-day training squad. On 19 November 2016, Ewels made his senior Test debut as a replacement for Courtney Lawes in an autumn international against Fiji.

On 20 April 2017, Ewels was named in the squad for the tour of Argentina and scored his first International try in the final test as England won the series. Later that year he scored another try in an autumn international against Samoa.

On 2 February 2020, Ewels started in the opening Six Nations fixture against France at the Stade de France and came off the bench in the final round as England won away to Italy to win the Championship.

On 12 March 2022, in a game against Ireland during the 2022 Six Nations, Ewels was sent off after 82 seconds after clashing heads with Ireland's James Ryan. On 22 June 2024, in his first international appearance following the red card against Ireland, Ewels was given a red card following a challenge on Japan's Michael Leitch at a ruck, 73 minutes into the game.

Ewels was included in the squad for their 2025 summer tour of Argentina. He played in the opening test which was Ewels first international appearance since his consecutive red cards. He also started in the next match as England defeated Argentina to win the series 2–0.

=== International tries ===
As of 7 July 2019

Try	Opposing team	Location	Venue	Competition	Date	Result	Score
1	Argentina	Santa Fe, Argentina	Estanislao Lopez Stadium	2017 England tour of Argentina	17 June 2017	Win	35 – 25
2	Samoa	London, England	Twickenham Stadium	2017 Autumn Internationals	25 November 2017	Win	48 – 14

== Honours ==
England

- 1× Six Nations Championship: 2020

Bath

- 1× Premiership Rugby: 2024–2025
- 1× EPCR Challenge Cup: 2024–2025
