= Mark Wilson (rugby union) =

England international rugby union player

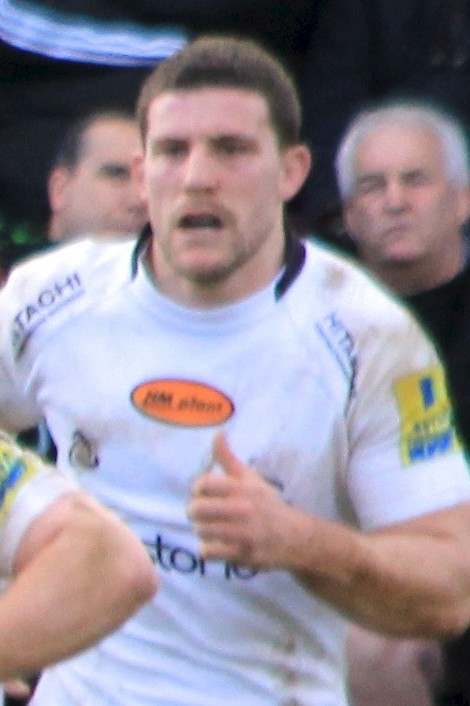
- Mark Wilson in 2014
- Born: Mark Edward Wilson; 6 October 1989 (age 37) Kendal, England
- Height: 1.91 m (6 ft 3 in)
- Weight: 112 kg (17 st 9 lb; 247 lb)
- School: Kirkbie Kendal School
- University: Northumbria University

Rugby union career
- Position(s): Flanker, Number 8
Amateur team(s)
Years	Team	Apps	(Points)
2003–2006	Penrith RUFC		
2006–2008	Kendal RUFC		
2008–2011	Blaydon RFC		
Senior career
Years	Team	Apps	(Points)
2010–2022	Newcastle Falcons	224	(145)
2019–2020	→Sale Sharks	2	(0)
- Correct as of 3 July 2019
International career
Years	Team	Apps	(Points)
2017–2021	England	23	(5)
- Correct as of 20 March 2021
Coaching career
- Years: Team
- 2022–: Newcastle Falcons

Mark Edward Wilson (born 6 October 1989) is an English rugby union coach and former player. He played as either a blindside flanker or at number 8. On 14 February 2022, he announced his retirement with immediate effect due to a problematic knee injury. Following his retirement he was reemployed by the Falcons as a coach.

== Playing career ==
=== Club ===
Wilson was a product of the Newcastle Falcons Junior Academy and signed a professional contract after playing for Kendal RUFC in the national 3 level. He also spent some time on loan from Newcastle Falcons at Blaydon RFC in the national level 2 in his first year after becoming professional. In March 2011 he was part of the Falcons team that were defeated by Gloucester in the final of the Anglo-Welsh Cup. Wilson started for the Newcastle side that defeated Bedford Blues in the 2012–13 RFU Championship final to achieve promotion back to the top flight.

In July 2019 it was announced that Wilson would be joining Premiership side Sale Sharks on a year-long loan following the relegation of Newcastle Falcons. Wilson returned to Newcastle for the 2020-2021 campaign and in total made 237 appearances for the club, scoring 42 tries.

=== International ===
Wilson represented both England Counties and England Students, and eventually played for the England senior side in a non-cap game against the Barbarians in May 2015. In May 2017 he was invited to a training camp with the senior England squad by coach Eddie Jones. On 10 June 2017 he made his Test debut starting against Argentina in the first test of their summer tour.

Wilson became a regular starter for England at the end of 2018, with Billy Vunipola and Sam Simmonds both ruled out because of injury, while Nathan Hughes had been suspended for foul play. In his first home start for England, Wilson claimed the Man of the Match award, as England beat South Africa by a single point during the 2018 Autumn Internationals. Wilson went on to start in all four of England's autumn internationals and was not subbed off during the series, winning the fan vote for the Quilter Internationals player of the series. It was during this series that Wilson scored his only International try on 17 November 2018 against Japan.

In September 2019 Wilson started for England in a warm-up game for the 2019 Rugby World Cup against Italy at St James' Park. He was selected by coach Eddie Jones as one of five back-row forwards for the tournament and played in the pool fixture against the United States and semi-final victory over New Zealand. He featured as a replacement coming on for Sam Underhill in the 59th minute of England's defeat to South Africa in the World Cup Final.

After the World Cup Wilson started for England against Wales during the 2020 Six Nations Championship which ended in England winning the tournament. His final International appearance was against Ireland in the 2021 Six Nations Championship.

=== International tries ===
As of 20 November 2021

Try	Opposing team	Location	Venue	Competition	Date	Result	Score
1	Japan	London, England	Twickenham Stadium	2018 end-of-year rugby union internationals	17 November 2018	Win	35 – 15

== Coaching career ==
=== Newcastle Falcons ===
Following his retirement from playing, Wilson was appointed a first team coach ahead of the 2022–23 season.

== Honours ==
England

- Six Nations Championship: 2020
- Rugby World Cup runner-up: 2019

Newcastle Falcons

- RFU Championship: 2012-13
- Anglo-Welsh Cup runner up: 2010-11
