= Denny Solomona =

Samoa (RL) & England (RU) international rugby footballer

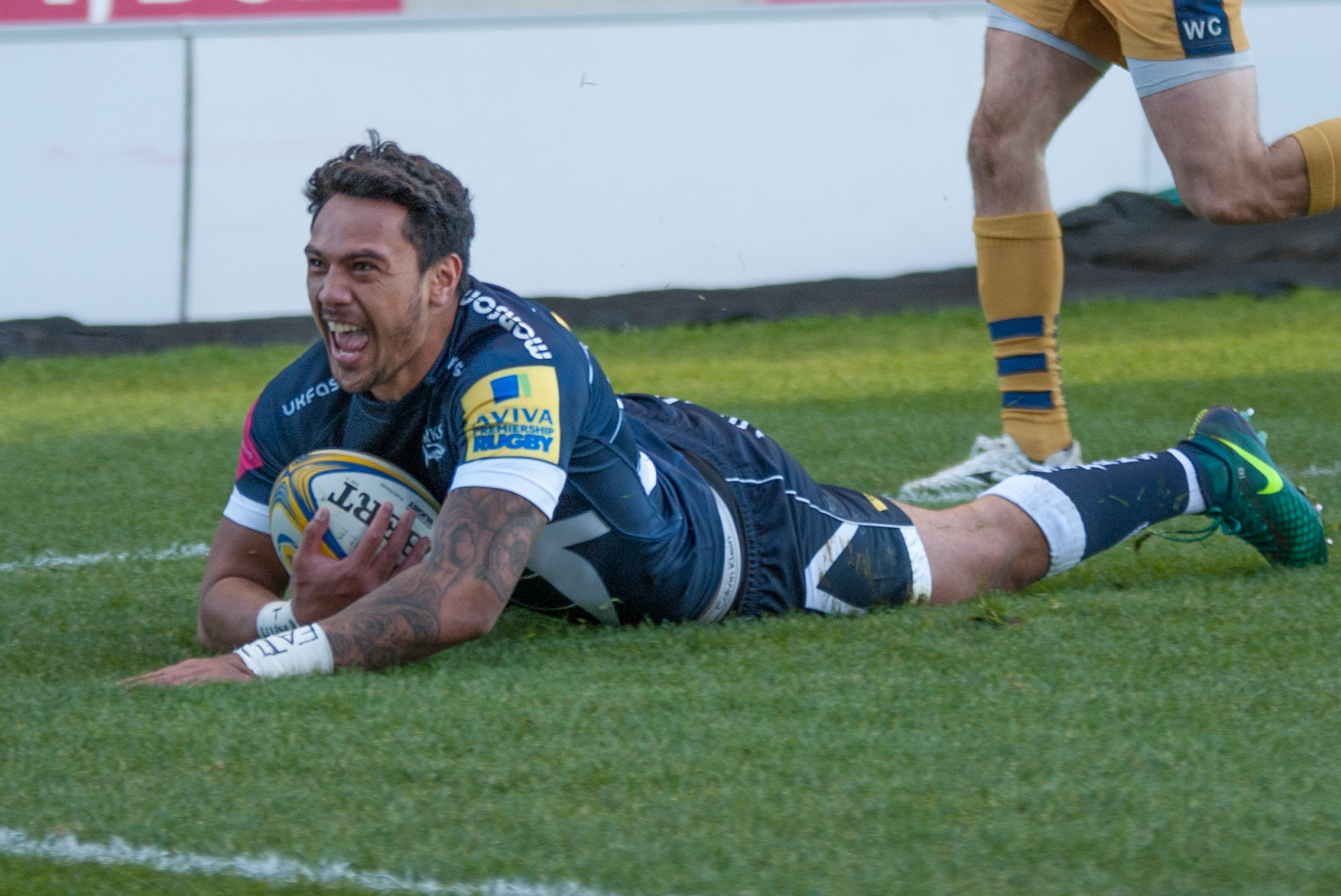

Personal information
- Full name: Denny Colenso Solomona
- Born: 27 September 1993 (age 33) Auckland, New Zealand
- Height: 6 ft 3 in (191 cm)
- Weight: 16 st 7 lb (105 kg)

Playing information

Rugby league
- Position: Wing
Club
Years	Team	Pld	T	G	FG	P
2014	London Broncos	21	10	0	0	40
2015–16	Castleford Tigers	45	60	0	0	240
	Total	66	70	0	0	280
Representative
Years	Team	Pld	T	G	FG	P
2016	Samoa	1	0	0	0	0

Rugby union
- Position: Wing
Club
Years	Team	Pld	T	G	FG	P
2016–21	Sale Sharks	88	47	0	0	230
2022	Highlanders	5	0	0	0	0
2022–23	North Harbour					0
	Total	93	47	0	0	230
Representative
Years	Team	Pld	T	G	FG	P
2017	England	5	1	0	0	5

Denny Solomona (born 27 September 1993) is a former professional rugby footballer who played rugby union as a winger for England at international level. He previously played rugby union for Sale Sharks in Premiership Rugby and played rugby league as a winger for the Melbourne Storm Under-20s, London Broncos and the Castleford Tigers. He played for Samoa at international rugby league. Now playing for Orrell Park as a player/coach in tier 8 of english rugby.

== Youth ==
Solomona was born and brought up in Auckland, and was educated first at Ōtāhuhu College then at St Peter's College where he was a member of the school's Rugby Union First XV and won the Boris Shroj Cup in 2010 as the top try scorer.

== Rugby League ==
In 2012, Solomona became a member of the Melbourne Storm Rugby League franchise being recruited out of Melbourne's youth system. He only played 13 games during the 2012 National Youth Competition season, with a fractured fibula in Round 13. Nevertheless, the 19-year-old scored eight tries from those 13 games. Solomona joined the Melbourne Storm's senior squad in 2013.

Solomona signed for Super League side London Broncos in January 2014 after being released from his contract with Melbourne Storm. Following the club's relegation, it was announced that he would join Castleford Tigers at the end of the season.

In 2016, Solomona scored a record-breaking 37th try in a single Super League season in Castleford's Super 8s win over Catalans. The try broke a 12-year record held by former dual-international, Lesley Vainikolo. Solomona finished the season with a total of 40 tries along with another 2 in the Challenge Cup competition. On 8 October 2016 Solomona made his International début for Samoa in their historical test match against Fiji in Apia.

== Rugby Union ==
On 13 December 2016, it was confirmed that Solomona had retired from rugby league, with two years still remaining on his contract with Castleford Tigers, to switch to rugby union, and join Sale Sharks in the Aviva Premiership. The move was subject to a legal dispute which was concluded out of court as Sale paid Castleford some £200,000 in compensation. On 29 March 2017, having enjoyed a prolific start to his career with Sale (10 tries in 11 appearances), Solomona declared himself available for international selection with England. He was subsequently called up to the senior England squad by Eddie Jones for their 2017 summer tour of Argentina and came on as a sub in the opening test and scored the winning try on his debut.l

=== International tries ===
As of 7 July 2019

Try	Opposing team	Location	Venue	Competition	Date	Result	Score
1	Argentina	San Juan, Argentina	Estadio San Juan del Bicentenario	2017 Tour of Argentina	10 June 2017	Win	38 – 34

== Influences ==
Solomona feels that meeting senior players can be important for the motivation and development of school age players.

== Post-playing Career ==
Solomona left North Harbour Rugby and returned to Wigan in 2023 where he commenced his plumbing apprenticeship. Solomona is the owner of Pasifika Plumbing and Heating
