= Josh Beaumont =

English rugby union player (born 1992)

- Born: Joshua Matthew Beaumont; 24 March 1992 (age 34) Blackpool, England
- Height: 2.01 m (6 ft 7 in)
- Weight: 118 kg (18 st 8 lb; 260 lb)
- School: Arnold School
- University: St Aidan's College, Durham
- Notable relative: Bill Beaumont (father)

Rugby union career
- Position(s): Number 8, Lock
Senior career
Years	Team	Apps	(Points)
2010–2013	Fylde	29	(25)
2013–2025	Sale Sharks	196	(100)
- Correct as of 26 April 2025
International career
Years	Team	Apps	(Points)
2015–2019	England XV	4	(5)
- Correct as of 2 June 2019

Josh Beaumont (born 24 March 1992) is an English former rugby union player. A number 8 or lock, he spent more than a decade with Sale Sharks and represented England in uncapped games against the Barbarians.

== Career ==
Beaumont joined Sale Sharks in the summer of 2012 on a dual-registration deal with Fylde after a spell with the Newcastle Falcons academy. In January 2013 he made his Sale debut in the 2012–13 Heineken Cup loss against Montpellier. His debut season in the Sale Sharks jersey was uneventful as well as his second season. During his third season at the club Beaumont became a regular starter under coach Steve Diamond.

After a stand-out 2014–15 season for Sale Sharks, Beaumont was called up to the senior England squad to play the Barbarians in May 2015. He started the match at number eight and scored a try in a 73–12 victory.

Beaumont was included in the England squad by new coach Eddie Jones for the 2016 Six Nations. After missing the 2016 Six Nations and the 2016 summer tour of Australia due to injury, he was named in the provisional England squad for the 2016–17 season. On 25 July 2016, Beaumont was named as Sale Sharks club captain for the 2016–17 season.

Beaumont started for the Sale side that lost to La Rochelle in the semi-final of the 2018–19 European Rugby Challenge Cup. At the end of that season he captained an England XV in their 51–43 victory over the Barbarians.

Beaumont played in the 2022–23 Premiership Rugby final which they lost against Saracens to finish league runners-up. In May 2025, after making 196 appearances for Sale, Beaumont announced his retirement from the sport.

== Personal life ==
Beaumont is the son of former England rugby union captain Bill Beaumont. Josh studied geography at Durham University between 2010–2013 and was part of St Aidan's College, Durham.

Beaumont has been in a relationship with fellow Durham University alumna Ailsa Mackie since early 2016.

== Honours ==
Sale Sharks

- Premiership Rugby runner-up: 2022–23
