= Neal Hatley =

English rugby union player

Neal Hatley (born 23 December 1969) is a rugby union player and coach.

== Playing career ==
Hatley played at prop for London Irish, Bedford and the University of Natal.

On 16 May 2007 he was selected to captain the England Saxons squad for the forthcoming Churchill Cup tournament in England, which he captained to victory lifting the Churchill Cup.

== Coaching career ==
After his playing career, he moved into coaching with the London Irish youth academy.

Hatley was forwards coach at Bath Rugby in 2012–16.
