= Nathan Earle (rugby union) =

English rugby union player

- Born: Nathan Earle; 25 September 1994 (age 32) Hong Kong
- Height: 1.88 m (6 ft 2 in)
- Weight: 101 kg (223 lb; 15 st 13 lb)
- School: Collier Street C of E Sutton Valence; Oaklands College

Rugby union career
- Position: Wing
Amateur team(s)
| Years | Team | Apps | (Points) |
| 2005-2012 | Cranbrook | | |
| 2013–2014 | Old Albanian | 8 | (20) |
Senior career
| Years | Team | Apps | (Points) |
| 2012–2018 | Saracens | 37 | (70) |
| 2014 | → Bedford | 1 | (0) |
| 2015–2016 | → London Scottish | 5 | (0) |
| 2016 | Canterbury | 10 | (20) |
| 2018–2021 | Harlequins | 38 | (80) |
| 2021–2023 | Newcastle Falcons | 17 | (25) |
| 2023–2025 | Ealing Trailfinders | | |
| 2025- | Tonbridge Juddians | | |
International career
| Years | Team | Apps | (Points) |
| 2012 | England U18 | | |
| 2014–2015 | England U20 | 8 | (35) |

Nathan Earle (born 25 September 1994) is a Hong Kong-born English professional rugby union footballer. He plays at wing and full back. He plays for Ealing Trailfinders. Previously he had dual-registration with Saracens F.C. and Bedford Blues.

Earle played for a young England XV against the Barbarians, scoring his first try on debut. Earle was called up to the senior England squad by Eddie Jones for their 2017 summer tour of Argentina.

== Career ==
=== Saracens ===
Earle joined the junior academy of Saracens at the age of 14, in 2011, while attending Sutton Valence School in Maidstone, Kent. In order to get additional training time with them he chose to move to Oaklands college during his sixth form years. He notes former super-star Richard Hill as being particularly crucial to his time in the academy.

While in the senior academy at the age of 17 he would play in the Saracens' team against the Asian Barbarians. This included a notable try where he defeated renowned All Black full-back, Mils Muliaina. Earle himself said this was less due to a particular physical or skill level of his but instead "I'd say he was so hungover in that game, and I was fresh as a daisy – I in-outed him, and then put the afterburners on".

His first-team debut occurred in 2012, against Worcester Warriors in the Anglo-Welsh tournament. However, in the 2013/14 season, Earle would only participate in 3 first-team games. Between injury and lack of opportunities Earle also received few chances to perform at first-team level in both the 2014/15 and 2015/16 seasons.

However, in the 2016/17 season, due to injury and suspensions among other Saracens' wingers, Earle received a number of chances to perform. This included 7 Premiership games, 3 Anglo-Welsh and 3 European (ECC) games. It was these performances that would lead to additional England interest.

The 2017/18 season was anticipated to also have a higher rate of winger rotation, due to multiple international call-ups, and Earle participated in 14 Aviva Premiership games alone, scoring 7 tries - placing him in the top 5 try scorers for Saracens in the tournament. Earle ended his season by coming on as a replacement and scoring one of Saracens' tries in the Premiership final as they defeated Exeter 27-10.

=== Old Albanians ===
Towards the halfway point of the 2013/14 season, in order to enable more play, Earle was dual-registered with Old Albanians, then in National League 1, where he would play 8 games over the remainder of the season.

=== Bedford Blues ===
After a season of minimal first-team play with Saracens, Earle was dual-registered with Bedford Blues, and participated well against Saracens in a pre-season game. However, in the first game of the season Earle suffered a major injury to his Achilles tendon.

There was significant consideration that the damage was so severe that Earle would have to leave his rugby career. However medical reconstruction and very long term physio-therapy allowed him to return to play within 9 months, although Earle stated that the injury "did not feel normal for 18 months".

=== London Scottish ===
In the 2015/16 season following the injury and recovery, due to a lack of junior player potential game-time (due to the absence of an Anglo-Welsh competition) played five times for London Scottish, between the British & Irish Cup and the Championship.

=== Sumner Rugby & Canterbury ===
In May 2016, after again having had relatively little first team play, Mark McCall suggested he spend 6 months in Christchurch, New Zealand, playing southern hemisphere rugby.

Earles originally played for amateur side Sumner Rugby which plays in the Christchurch league. Already known by then Canterbury coach Scott Robertson (rugby union), as well as Scott's assistant, former Saracen Joe Maddock (rugby union) his performances for the club would get him invited to play with Canterbury for the remainder of his six months in New Zealand.

Earles would be selected for 10 of Canterbury's games, including participating in both the team that would win the Mitre 10 cup, where he scored a try, and the side that won the Ranfurly shield. As a side note, he received his only yellow card of all his performances as of September 2018.

After his return, Earle stated the time with the Southern Hemisphere team was particularly beneficial, especially his training with Joe Maddock. Earle cited several specific areas that he found improved while at Canterbury. He said the focus was on on-pitch training as opposed to gym work, with a corresponding focus on those skills. He also enjoyed the looser, faster-flowing, form of rugby as suited to his own style of play, particularly with Maddock's passing on expertise in quicker reading of the game. Finally he noted that the New Zealand club side had an enormous focus on "micro-skills" which targets extremely fine details such as foot placement.

=== Harlequins ===
Towards the end of the 2017/18 season it was announced that Earle would join Harlequins, with a heavy indication that the move was to enable additional game time.

=== Newcastle Falcons ===
Earle joined Newcastle Falcons ahead of the 2021–22 season.

=== Ealing Trailfinders ===
In January 2023, it was confirmed that Earle had left Newcastle and joined RFU Championship side Ealing Trailfinders with immediate effect.
