= Scott Wisemantel =

Australian rugby coach (born 1970)

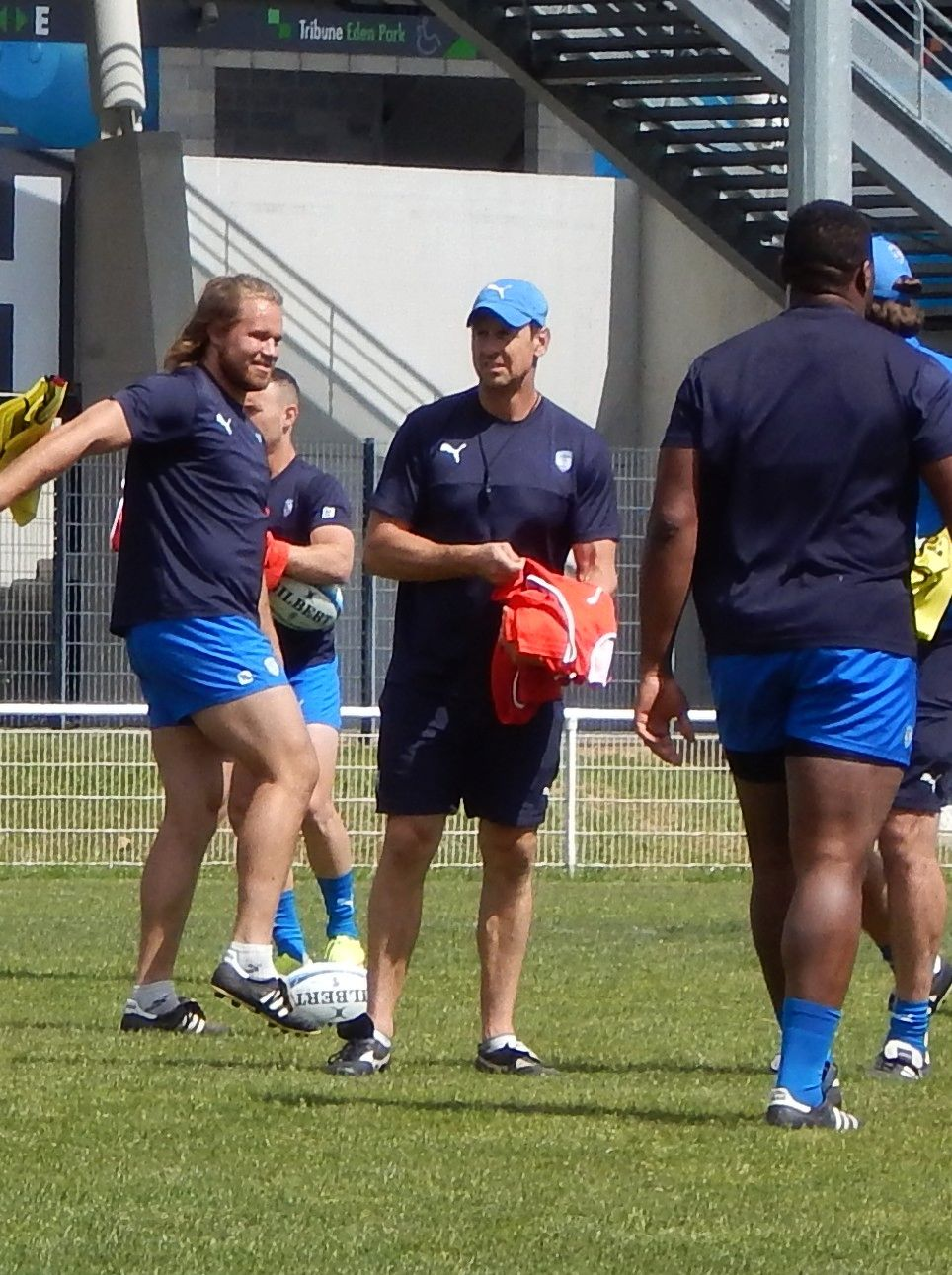
- Wisemantel in 2016

Personal information
- Born: 2 April 1970 (age 56)

Playing information
Club
Years	Team	Pld	T	G	FG	P
1988–1992	Parramatta Eels

Coaching information
Club
Years	Team	Gms	W	D	L	W%
2025	Parramatta Eels

Rugby union career
- Position: Fly-half
Senior career
Years	Team	Apps	(Points)
1992-99	Eastwood Rugby Club		
Coaching career
- Years: Team
- 1999-2000: Toyota Verblitz (backs)
- 2001-2002: NSW Waratahs (skills)
- 2002–2003: AS Montferrand (backs)
- 2004–2005: Australia U19
- 2004–2007: Australia (skills)
- 2009–2010: NSW Waratahs (backs)
- 2011: Samoa (specialist)
- 2012–2013: Japan (backs)
- 2014–2015: Lyon OU (backs)
- 2015–2018: Montpellier (assistant)
- 2016: Australia A
- 2018: England (attack)
- 2020–2023: Australia (attack)

Scott Wisemantel (born 2 April 1970) is an Australian former dual code rugby player and current coach, who played rugby union for Eastwood Rugby Club and rugby league for the Parramatta Eels.

== Playing career ==
- 1988–1992: Parramatta Eels (Rugby league Club)
- 1992–1999: Eastwood Rugby Club (Rugby Union Club), playing at fly half.

== Coaching career ==
- 1999–2000: Japan Toyota Verblitz (backs coach)
- 2001–2002: Australia NSW Waratahs (skills)
- 2002–2003: France AS Montferrand (backs coach)
- 2004–2005: Australia Under 19 National Team (head coach)
- 2004–2007: Australia (skills)
- 2009–2010: Australia NSW Waratahs (backs coach)
- 2011: Manu Samoa Specialist Coach World Cup
- 2012–2013: Japan National Team (backs coach)
- November 2013: Japan National Team (interim head coach)
- 2014–2015: France Lyon OU (backs coach)
- 2015: Japan (working with Eddie Jones at the World Cup)
- 2015 – 2018: France Montpellier Hérault Rugby (assistant coach and backs coach, alongside club manager Jake White and forwards coach Shaun Sowerby)
- 2016: Australia XV (head coach v French Barbarians)
- 2018: England Rugby (attack consultant on the South Africa tour, subsequently extended.)
- 2020–2023: Australia (attack consultant)
- 2025–present Parramatta Eels assistant coach (attack)

When Wisemantel was coaching the Waratahs, he introduced the idea of his back three all working as full backs.
