= Nick Schonert =

South African rugby union player (born 1991)

- Full name: Nicholas Peter Schonert
- Born: 20 September 1991 (age 35) Durban, South Africa
- Height: 1.89 m (6 ft 2 1/2 in)
- Weight: 119 kg (18 st 10 lb; 262 lb)
- School: Maritzburg College

Rugby union career
- Position: Tighthead Prop
Amateur team(s)
Years	Team	Apps	(Points)
2013	UFS Shimlas	8	(0)
Senior career
Years	Team	Apps	(Points)
2012	Sharks (Currie Cup)	1	(0)
2013	Griquas	14	(0)
2014	Free State Cheetahs	3	(0)
2014–2021	Worcester Warriors	133	(15)
2021–2025	Sale Sharks	61	(0)
2025	Mitsubishi Sagamihara DynaBoars	0	(0)
2025–present	Vannes	0	(0)
- Correct as of 22 November 2024
International career
Years	Team	Apps	(Points)
2011	South Africa Under-20	5	(0)
2013	South African Barbarians	1	(0)
- Correct as of 9 May 2013

Nicholas Peter Schonert (born 20 September 1991) is a South African rugby union player who plays for Vannes. His playing position is prop.

== Career ==
Schonert previously played his early rugby with the Sharks and made one appearance for them during the 2012 Vodacom Cup. He then joined Griquas during the 2013 Vodacom Cup, making six appearances.

He was a member of the South Africa under 20 team that played in the 2011 IRB Junior World Championship and was also named in a South African Barbarians team to face Saracens.

Schonert signed for the Free State Cheetahs for 2014. After less than a season at the Cheetahs, however, Schonert signed for English Premiership side Worcester Warriors. Schonert qualified to represent England through an English grandmother and in May 2017, he was invited to a training camp with the senior England squad by coach Eddie Jones. Later that month Schonert was ruled out of their 2017 tour of Argentina due to a hand ligament injury. The following year in May 2018 he played for an England XV in a non-cap game against Barbarians at Twickenham.

On 29 July 2021, Schonert left Worcester after they suffered financial problems and signed for Premiership rivals Sale Sharks on a three-year contract from the 2021–22 season. In his first season at Sale he played in their European Champions Cup quarter-final elimination against Racing 92. The following campaign saw him start in the 2023 Premiership final which they lost against Saracens to finish league runners up.

In April 2025, after four seasons with the club it was announced that Schonert had departed Sale. He then signed for Mitsubishi Sagamihara DynaBoars but ultimately only spent a fortnight in Japan without playing any games. Schonert subsequently joined Vannes.
