= Will Collier =

English rugby union player (born 1991)

- Born: William St Lawrence Webb Collier; 5 May 1991 (age 35) Hammersmith, London, England
- Height: 1.83 m (6 ft 0 in)
- Weight: 116 kg (18 st 4 lb)
- School: Cranleigh School

Rugby union career
- Position: Tighthead Prop
- Current team: Castres
Youth career
- 1997–2009: Rosslyn Park
- 2005–2011: Harlequins
Senior career
Years	Team	Apps	(Points)
2009–2011	Rosslyn Park	40	(30)
2011–2024	Harlequins	240	(20)
2011–2012	→ Esher	7	(0)
2024–	Castres	0	(0)
- Correct as of 2 August 2024
International career
Years	Team	Apps	(Points)
2011	England U20	7	(0)
2014–2022	England XV	3	(0)
2017	England	2	(5)
- Correct as of 11 December 2023

William St Lawrence Webb Collier (born 5 May 1991) is an English professional rugby union player who plays as a tighthead prop for Top 14 club Castres Olympique.

== Career ==
Collier is a front row specialist who cites his interest in the 'dark arts' (of scrummaging) inspired in part by Chris Ritchie, a veteran London Welsh RFC player and Joe Launchbury, a former England Rugby international. His first club was Rosslyn Park F.C. where he began at six years old and played in their mini, youth and First XV squads.

Collier joined the Harlequins academy at the age of fourteen. In January 2011 he made his club debut for Quins against Wasps RFC in a 2010–11 Anglo-Welsh Cup fixture.

Collier represented England U20 during the 2011 Six Nations Under 20s Championship and appeared as a substitute in the last round as they defeated Ireland to complete a grand slam. Later that year he was a member of their squad at the 2011 IRB Junior World Championship and came off the bench in the final which England lost against New Zealand to finish runners up.

Collier was on the substitutes bench when Harlequins overcame Leicester Tigers in the 2012 Premiership final to become league champions for the first time in their history. In March 2013 Collier started for the side that defeated Sale Sharks to win the Anglo-Welsh Cup. He scored his debut try for Harlequins in a European Rugby Champions Cup defeat to La Rochelle in the pool stage of the 2017–18 season.

Collier was included in the senior England squad for their 2017 tour of Argentina. On 10 June 2017 he made his Test debut as a substitute against Argentina. A week later Collier scored a try as England won the series. Ultimately these were his only two caps.

In the 2020–21 season, Collier was a replacement in both the Premiership semi-final victory over Bristol Bears and the final against Exeter Chiefs on 26 June 2021, as Harlequins won the game 40–38 in the highest scoring Premiership final ever. The following year saw Collier start for an England XV side in an uncapped match against the Barbarians.

In his final season at Harlequins Collier started for the side that were eliminated by Toulouse in the semi-final of the 2024 Champions Cup. After more than a decade with Harlequins making 240 club appearances, Collier joined Castres Olympique for the 2024–25 season.

== International career ==
=== International tries ===
As of 11 December 2023

Try	Opposing team	Location	Venue	Competition	Date	Result	Score
1	Argentina	Santa Fe, Argentina	Estadio Brigadier General Estanislao López	2017 Tour of Argentina	17 June 2017	Win	35 – 25

== Honours ==
Harlequins

- 2× Premiership: 2011–12, 2020–21
- 1× Anglo-Welsh Cup: 2012–13

England U20

- 1× Six Nations Under 20s Championship: 2011
- 1× World Rugby U20 Championship runner up: 2011
