= Piers Francis =

England international rugby union player

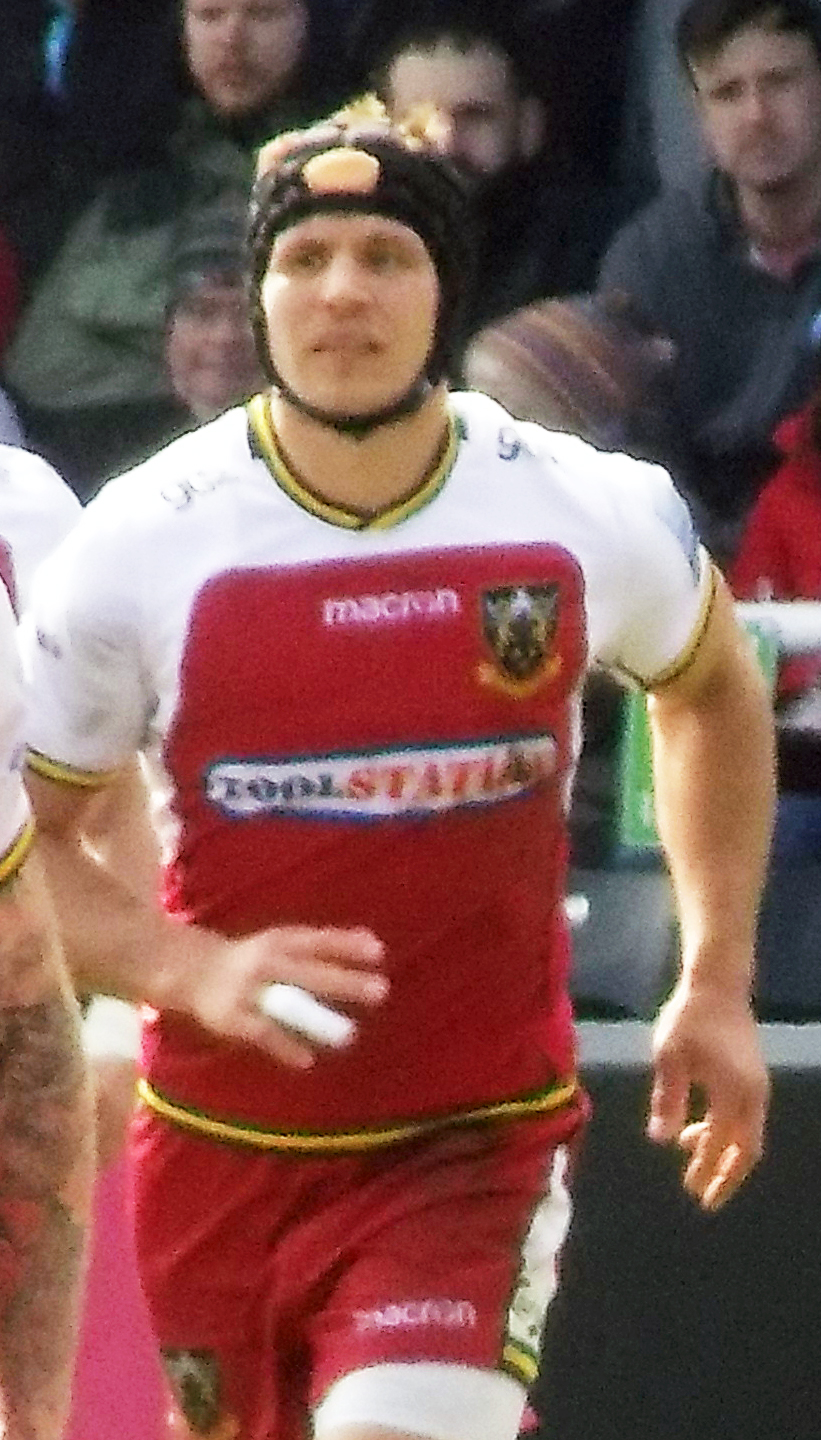
- Born: 20 June 1990 (age 36) Gravesend, England
- Height: 1.83 m (6 ft 0 in)
- Weight: 94 kg (14 st 11 lb; 207 lb)

Rugby union career
- Position(s): Fly-half, Centre
Senior career
Years	Team	Apps	(Points)
2012–2014	Edinburgh Rugby	15	(33)
2014–2015	Doncaster Knights	7	(0)
2017–2022	Northampton Saints	84	(204)
2022–2023	Bath	20	(109)
2023–2026	Kurita Water Gush	24	(137)
2026–	Hino Red Dolphins		
- Correct as of 27 June 2022
Provincial / State sides
Years	Team	Apps	(Points)
2011	Auckland	7	(7)
2012	Waikato	8	(10)
2015–2016	Counties Manukau	19	(191)
- Correct as of 1 June 2017
Super Rugby
Years	Team	Apps	(Points)
2016–2017	Blues	24	(120)
- Correct as of 2 June 2017
International career
Years	Team	Apps	(Points)
2017-2019	England	8	(5)
- Correct as of 17 September 2019

Piers Francis (born 20 June 1990) is an English rugby union footballer who plays in the fly-half and occasionally inside centre position. His current club is Kurita Water Gush, United he has previously played for Northampton Saints, the Blues in Super Rugby, Edinburgh, Doncaster Knights & Bath.

== Career ==
Francis was born in Gravesend, Kent, attended Kent College, Canterbury and played for Old Gravesendians RFC & Maidstone FC. He was also a member of the Saracens Academy for three years during his teens. He moved to New Zealand at the age of 18 and played ITM Cup rugby for both Auckland and Waikato before returning to the UK in 2012 to sign with Edinburgh.

He spent two years with the Edinburgh outfit, but suffered an injury in the pre-season ahead of the 2013-14 campaign which effectively kept him out of action for the whole season.

He was released in the summer of 2014 along with other fly-halves Harry Leonard and Gregor Hunter.

It was announced in November 2014 that he had signed with RFU Championship side Doncaster Knights, with the contract running until March 2015.

For the remainder of 2015 Francis returned to New Zealand, where he linked with the ITM Cup team Counties Manukau on a two-year deal. After a strong showing in a Tana Umaga coached side, he followed his coach and signed a deal with the Super Rugby team the Blues for the 2016 Super Rugby season.

On 20 March 2017, Francis signed to return to England and join Gallagher Premiership club Northampton Saints from the 2017–18 season. This made him eligible to be picked for England again, and he was subsequently picked for England's 2017 summer tour of Argentina.

== International career ==
=== International tries ===
As of 7 July 2019

Try	Opposing team	Location	Venue	Competition	Date	Result	Score
1	Argentina	Santa Fe, Argentina, Argentina	Estadio Brigadier General Estanislao López	2017 Tour of Argentina	17 June 2017	Win	35 – 25

== Honours ==
- Rugby World Cup / Webb Ellis Cup
  - Runner up: 2019
