= Eddie Jones (rugby union) =

Australian rugby union coach and former player

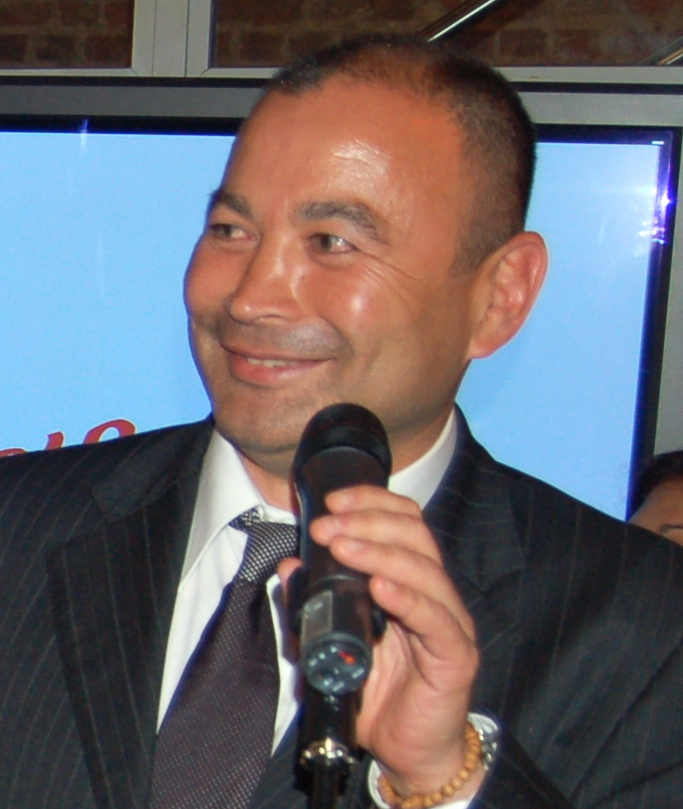
- Born: 30 January 1960 (age 66) Burnie, Tasmania, Australia
- Height: 1.70 m (5 ft 7 in)
- School: Matraville Sports High School

Rugby union career
- Position: Hooker
Senior career
Years	Team	Apps	(Points)
1981–1991	Randwick	210	(56)
1991–1992	Leicester Tigers	3	
Provincial / State sides
Years	Team	Apps	(Points)
1987–1989	New South Wales	12	(0)
Coaching career
- Years: Team
- 1994: Randwick (Assistant coach)
- 1995–1996: Tokai University (Assistant coach)
- 1996: Japan (Assistant coach)
- 1997: Suntory Sungoliath (Assistant coach)
- 1998–2001: ACT Brumbies
- 2001–2005: Australia
- 2006: Saracens (Technical advisor)
- 2007: Queensland Reds
- 2007: South Africa (Technical advisor)
- 2007–2009: Saracens (Technical advisor)
- 2009–2012: Suntory Sungoliath
- 2012–2015: Japan
- 2015: Stormers
- 2015–2022: England
- 2023: Australia
- 2024–: Japan

Edward Jones (born 30 January 1960), is an Australian rugby union coach and former player. He coached the Australia national team from January until October 2023. He has previously coached Australia, Japan and England. He returned to the role of Japan head coach in January 2024.

He coached Australia between 2001 and 2005, taking the team to the 2003 Rugby World Cup final. He was an advisor with South Africa when the Springboks won the 2007 Rugby World Cup, and from 2012 to 2015 he coached Japan, leading them in the 2015 Rugby World Cup and an upset win over South Africa. In November 2015, Jones was appointed head coach of England and led them to win the 2016 and 2017 Six Nations Championships, becoming only the second national team to be unbeaten in a calendar year. He led England to the 2019 Rugby World Cup final when they were beaten by South Africa.

Jones played as a hooker for Sydney club Randwick and New South Wales and began coaching Randwick in 1994. He continued his career in Japan between 1995 and 1997 for Tokai University, as an assistant to the Japan national team and for Suntory Sungoliath. In 1998 he returned to Australia, taking charge of ACT Brumbies in Super Rugby and also coached the Queensland Reds in the 2007 Super Rugby season. In 2008, he had a brief spell at Saracens in England's Premiership, before returning to Suntory Sungoliath for a second spell which culminated in winning the 2011–12 Top League championship.

== Early and personal life ==
Jones was born in 1960 in the Tasmanian town of Burnie, Australia to a Japanese mother (Note: She has also been cited as half-Japanese.) and an Australian father. He is married to Hiroko Jones, a Japanese woman whom he met while teaching at the International Grammar School in Sydney. They have a daughter, Chelsea Jones. Jones is a supporter of English football team West Ham United, and Australian rugby league team, the South Sydney Rabbitohs in the National Rugby League (NRL).

Jones was raised in Sydney, New South Wales, during which time his father served in the Vietnam War. He attended La Perouse Public School in the city's South-East, alongside Mark, Glen and Gary Ella.

== Playing career ==
Jones started his playing career at Matraville Sports High School. He played as a hooker for Randwick between 1981 and 1991 and New South Wales. Jones played against the British Lions for New South Wales B in 1989. He also made three appearances for Leicester during the 1991/92 season in England. He retired to concentrate on a career as a teacher and school principal.

He is described in the Randwick Hall of Fame as follows: "A light-weight and mobile hooker who played 210 club games from 1981 to 1991, scoring 14 tries [56pts]. His first grade games numbered 147 and in them he scored 10 tries [40pts]. A tigerish forward, who played well above his weight, he supplemented good tight forward play by operating as a third flanker. He played in six first grade grand finals [1984 to 1989] of which Randwick lost only two [1985 and 1986]. He also played in two reserve grade finals [1983 and 1991]. captaining the side which won in 1991, which was his last game for Randwick. He was the club's best and fairest player in 1982, was awarded the Ron Don trophy for the most improved club player in 1982 and 1985 and the Wally Meagher trophy for the best clubman in 1990."

== Coaching career ==
=== Early coaching career ===
In 1994 Jones gave up his career as a teacher and school principal to coach his former club Randwick. He then went to Japan, where he had brief stints coaching Tokai University, Japan (as assistant coach) and Suntory Sungoliath.

=== ACT Brumbies (1998–2001) ===
Jones returned to Australia in 1998 to coach the ACT Brumbies. However, he had a disappointing first season in charge, with the club finishing only 10th in the Super 12; he has since said he was "way out of his depth".

Jones went on to lead the Brumbies into the best period of their history. In 2000 they were runners-up, losing the final to the Crusaders, but in 2001 he coached them to their first title, the first team from outside New Zealand to win the tournament. Notably, while with the Brumbies, it was Jones who was credited with discovering George Smith while at a trial for a rugby league team, the Manly Warringah Sea Eagles.

=== Australia (2001–2005) ===
In 2001 Jones coached Australia A during the British & Irish Lions tour of Australia, winning 28–25. Aside from the national team, Australia A was the only side to win against the touring Lions side.

He was appointed head coach of Australia before their Tri Nations Series 14 days later, following Rod Macqueen's retirement. Under Jones, Australia won the 2001 Tri Nations, and then entered their home World Cup in 2003 as third favourites behind New Zealand and England. They managed to upset the All Blacks in the semi-final before losing to England in the final in extra time through a last-minute drop goal.

After the World Cup, Jones was awarded a contract to lead Australia through to the 2007 Rugby World Cup. He also had an offer to coach Japan which he turned down.

In 2005, the Wallabies suffered a spate of injuries, losing seven games straight. At the end of their European tour they lost eight of the last nine matches, with the scrum in particular struggling. After a 22–24 loss to Wales at the Millennium Stadium on 2 December 2005, Jones' contract was terminated.

=== Queensland Reds (2007) ===
Just over a month after Jones was relieved of his position as Wallabies head coach, he signed a three-year deal with the Queensland Reds to take over as head coach after the 2006 Super 14 season. In February 2006 he joined Saracens in a consultancy role until the end of the season to help them after they were struggling near the bottom of the league.

Jones endured a torrid season with the Reds in 2007, who finished bottom of the Super 14 table, only managing two wins the entire season. Injury spells meant Jones at times had to do without up to eight regulars in his starting team, including the loss of influential Wallabies fullback Chris Latham even before the season started. His last match was an away defeat to the Bulls by a Super Rugby record margin of 89 points, which led to mounting calls in the media for him to be sacked. His stint at the Reds is by far the least successful of his coaching career and he resigned after just one season in charge. During his time at the Reds he was also fined $10,000 for calling the performance of referee Matt Goddard "disgraceful" and "lacking common sense" after a close 6–3 loss to his former side the Brumbies.

=== South Africa (2007) ===
Later in 2007, Jones turned down an approach from Fiji to be a technical advisor to the 2007 Rugby World Cup in France, and instead was appointed by Springbok coach Jake White to be a technical advisor for the South Africa team at the tournament. He was criticised by the ARU Chief Executive John O'Neill for taking up a job to try to help Australia's rivals.

South Africa went on to win the World Cup and Jones was praised for his role in the success, with former coach Nick Mallett calling the move from White to appoint him a "masterstroke" and crediting Jones with improved backline play by South Africa at the tournament. Despite being an official part of the Springbok coaching team, Jones was not given a Springbok blazer because he is not South African. He wore his tracksuit instead, a condition in his contract with SA Rugby prior to being appointed.

After the World Cup, Jones rejoined Saracens, initially in an advisory role, before taking over the director of rugby role for the 2008/09 season. However, he announced in February that he would be stepping down at the end of the season for personal reasons, but he then quit early in March 2009 after disagreements with the board. He described this period as the worst he has had in rugby.

=== Return to Japan (2012–2015) ===
After leaving Saracens, Jones rejoined Suntory Sungoliath in Japan. He brought together a strong team, including George Smith, Fourie du Preez and Danie Rossouw, whom he had coached previously, and led them to victory in the Top League title in 2012, winning the final 47–28 against the Panasonic Wild Knights, as well as two consecutive All Japan Championship wins.

Following the resignation of Sir John Kirwan, Jones was appointed in 2012 as head coach of the Japan national team, to lead them to the 2015 Rugby World Cup. He quickly took the team in a different direction from Kirwan. His first move as the Japan coach was to reduce the number of foreign players, who had been a prominent part of the Japan team under Kirwan, and to encourage the Japanese to play their own style. He also said his goal was to bring Japan up a level, to be among the top 10.

Despite losing all three of his first Pacific Nations Cup matches by narrow margins, in November 2012 Jones coached the side to their first ever wins in Europe, beating Romania and Georgia.

In 2013, Jones led Japan to their sixth consecutive championship win in the Asian Five Nations, where they achieved a tournament record score of 121–0 against the Philippines. Japan lost to Tonga in the opening round of the 2013 IRB Pacific Nations Cup, and were later defeated by Fiji in round 2. Following these matches, Jones coached the Brave Blossoms to a series draw against Wales after narrowly losing the first test 18–22 and winning the second test 23–8. This was the first time Japan had recorded a victory over the Welsh.

On 16 October, Jones was hospitalised for two days after a suspected stroke. With his release from hospital, it was announced that he would miss Japan's 2013 end-of-year rugby union tests against New Zealand, Scotland, Gloucester, Russia and Spain, and that former Australia skills coach and current technical adviser for Japan, Scott Wisemantel, would coach Japan in the interim for the end-of-year tests.

In 2014, Jones secured Japan's seventh consecutive Asian Five Nations title, before jointly winning the 2014 IRB Pacific Nations Cup with Fiji. Japan won the Asia/Pacific conference with victories over Canada 34–25 and the United States 37–29. In June of that year, Japan claimed a 26–23 victory over Italy, which was Japan's tenth consecutive win, a record for a Tier 2 team. During the 2014 end-of-year rugby union internationals, Japan lost their series with the Māori All Blacks 2–0, but went on to secure an 18–13 win over Romania. Following this victory, Japan rose to ninth in the World Rankings, their highest-ever position, and achieved Jones' aim of reaching the top 10 in the world.

In 2015, after securing the 2015 Asian Rugby Championship, Japan suffered three consecutive losses in the 2015 World Rugby Pacific Nations Cup. After beating Canada 20–6, they lost to the United States, Fiji and Tonga to finish fourth with just one win. Japan later went on to beat Uruguay twice and Georgia in World Cup Warm-up matches. At the 2015 Rugby World Cup, Japan managed an upset win over South Africa with a spectacular last-minute try in their first pool match, finishing the match 34–32, an incredible victory with bold determination. However, Japan lost four days later to Scotland 45–10, despite still being in contention at half time. A week later, Japan secured a record victory over Samoa, winning 26–5, which guaranteed a top three finish for Japan in the pool. In the final match of the pool stage, Japan beat the United States 28–18, meaning that Japan became the first ever nation to record three victories in the pool stage while failing to advance to the knock out stage. That victory was Jones' last in charge of Japan.

=== Stormers (2015) ===
After completing his duties at the helm of Japan's national team at the 2015 Rugby World Cup, Jones joined Super Rugby franchise the Stormers in Cape Town on 12 November 2015. Just eight days after joining the Stormers, he was signed by England Rugby as Stuart Lancaster's replacement, to become England's first foreign head coach. The RFU paid a compensation figure of £100,000 to release him from his contract with the Stormers due to a break clause in the agreement. In November 2015, Jones became one of the highest-paid head coaches in world rugby.

=== England (2015–2022) ===
Jones was named as the new England head coach on 20 November 2015. He agreed a four-year deal to become England's first foreign head coach, that would see him lead the team through the 2019 Rugby World Cup. The deal was extended twice and was scheduled to last until the end of 2023 World Cup. Jones brought in as his assistant coaches Steve Borthwick from Bristol, with whom he had also coached Japan, and Paul Gustard from Saracens.

In 2016, the coaching team led England to their first Grand Slam in 13 years, when they defeated all their opponents at the Six Nations Championship. They opened with a 15–9 win over Scotland before seeing out Italy 40–9. In Jones' first home game on 27 February 2016, he led England to a 21–10 victory over Ireland, before they went on to beat Wales 25–21 two weeks later; at one point in the match they were leading the Welsh team 19–0, but then conceded three tries in the second half. England secured the Championship on 13 March with one game in hand when Scotland beat France, meaning that England went into the final round having already secured the title. A 31–21 victory over France in the final game of the Championship on 19 March saw England win their first Grand Slam since 2003.

Three months later, Jones took his English side on a tour of Australia for a three-test series against Australia; England won the series 3–0 in their first-ever three-test series victory. They scored their most points against Australia in the first test, winning 39–28, and claimed their third consecutive victory over the Wallabies on Australian soil when they won the second test 23–7, a record-winning streak for the game played in Australia's home territory. The final test confirmed the series whitewash, England winning the match 44–40. During the series, Jones had led England from fourth in the world to second. In the 2016 Autumn Internationals, he guided England through to their 14th consecutive win, 13 of these under his leadership, and they became just the second team after New Zealand to win every one of their games in a calendar year. Jones then led England to a 37–21 win against South Africa, their first victory over the Springboks since 2006. England later saw off Fiji 58–15, before beating Argentina 27–14 a week later, this despite an England player being sent off after five minutes. England finished the autumn tests with a 37–21 win over Australia.

During the 2017 Six Nations Championship, Jones experienced his first defeat as England head coach when the team travelled to Dublin for their final game of the Championship, which they lost 9–13. Not only would a win have secured England's second consecutive Grand Slam but it would also have been a record 19th consecutive victory. Despite this disappointment, England were the overall winners of the Championship with wins over France (19–16), Wales (21–16), Italy (36–15), and Scotland (61–21). In June 2017, Jones took an inexperienced side for a two-test series in Argentina; the team included 18 uncapped players, eight of whom were less than 21 years old. Nevertheless, England won the series 2–0 with a 38–34 victory in the first test and a 35–25 victory in the second. England continued their form during the 2017 Autumn Internationals, winning all three of their tests: 21–8 against Argentina, 30–6 against Australia, and 48–14 against Samoa.

England finished the 2018 Six Nations Championship in their lowest-ever position in the league table, and their worst since the 1983 Five Nations Championship, finishing in fifth place having only beaten Italy (46–15) and Wales (12–6). England's consecutive losses to Scotland, France and Ireland were their first triple defeat since 2014. Their loss to Scotland was the first since 2010, and their loss to Ireland was the first at home since 2010. A 45–63 loss against the Barbarians followed in May of the same year, with former England international Chris Ashton scoring a hat-trick of tries against his ex-teammates. England's run of defeats continued into the June test series, when they lost the first two matches of their three-test series against South Africa. However, they avoided a 3–0 series defeat by winning the third test 25–10 to claim their first win in South Africa since 2000. When former New Zealand and U.S. coach John Mitchell joined the coaching team as defence coach, England achieved a return win (12–11) against South Africa in a tightly contested match on 3 November in the 2018 Autumn Internationals. Another close-fought test against New Zealand a week later also finished with a single-point scoreline difference (15–16), but this time in favour of the opposition. England then won their remaining autumn tests against Japan (35–15) and Australia (37–18). The win against the Wallabies was England's sixth consecutive victory over the Australians, continuing their perfect record against Jones' former team during his tenure.

England drew 38–38 with Scotland in the 2019 Six Nations Championship, meaning that Scotland retained the Calcutta Cup. England had led 31–0 just half an hour into the match but Scotland scored six unanswered tries to go 38–31 ahead with five minutes remaining, only for England to tie the score with a converted try in the last play of the match. Jones claimed that his team had a recurring "mental block" that needed fixing after a similar incident three weeks previously against Wales. The 38–38 draw is currently the highest-scoring tied match in international rugby history.

Jones guided England to their first World Cup final since 2007 when they beat reigning world champions New Zealand 19–7 in the semi-finals of the 2019 Rugby World Cup. South Africa overpowered England in the final a week later to deliver a 32–12 defeat, ending Jones' ambition of leading his team to World Cup glory in Japan.

On 6 December 2022, Jones was sacked as England head coach by the RFU following a poor run of results in which England had won just 5 of 12 tests in 2022. Jones left England with a win percentage of 73%, the highest of any England coach.

=== Return to Australia (2023) ===
In January 2023, Jones was re-appointed as the head coach of Australia, replacing Dave Rennie, and returning to his former post after 17 years and 63 days. The appointment was reported to be worth A$4.5 million over the tenure of the appointment, to run until the conclusion of Australia's campaign at the 2027 Rugby World Cup, in which Australia will also host. Jones would simultaneously "oversee" the women's team. Jones formally began his role as head coach on 29 January 2023.

Before taking the job as Australia coach, Jones and Rugby Australia (RA) executives, Hamish McLennan and Andy Marinos, had held numerous talks dating back six months, reportedly only days after the 2022 England tour of Australia. Although they were initially reported as insignificant due to Jones' England duties and Dave Rennie's contract (which lasted until the end of the 2023 Rugby World Cup), speculation was significantly heightened when Jones was dismissed by the RFU in December 2022.

Jones' first match as head coach of Australia was against South Africa in Pretoria. Jones' last match against South Africa in Pretoria was in the 2005 Tri Nations Series, which ended in a 22–16 defeat. Although Australia scored the first try of the match, and led for the first fifteen-minutes of the match, South Africa scored forty-three unanswered points, winning the match 43–12. It is the Springboks' third biggest victory over Australia by margin. They followed this up with a 31–34 loss to Argentina the following week. Two weeks later, in the third, and final, round of the 2023 Rugby Championship (which was shortened due to the Rugby World Cup) Australia lost to New Zealand 7–38 at the Melbourne Cricket Ground (MCG). Due to suffering three consecutive defeats, Australia finished wooden spooners for the first time since the expansion of the competition in 2012.

In the lead-up to the Rugby World Cup, Australia played just two fixtures: against New Zealand following the conclusion of the Rugby Championship, and one warm-up fixture against hosts France. The match against New Zealand was the closest (alongside Australia–Argentina meeting) Australia had come to a victory during the year, losing 23–20. The latter match (against France), played at the Stade de France, was another heavy defeat; Australia losing 41–17.

By the time of Australia's opening encounter with Georgia in Pool C of the World Cup, they were 9th in the World Rugby Rankings (second-best in their pool), and had not won a match from five attempts. At the World Cup, Australia beat Georgia 35–15, and then lost 15–22 to Fiji. This was Fiji's biggest win over Australia, and their first in 69 years. Australia then lost 6–40 to Wales, in a game they effectively needed to win to progress to the knockout stages. This was the biggest defeat of Jones's tenure, and Australia's eighth largest defeat ever. In their last match, Australia defeated Portugal 34–14, but did not advance to the next round. This was the first World Cup when Australia were knocked out in the pool stage.

==== JRFU controversy ====
On 24 September 2023, seventeen hours before Australia's fixture against Wales, it was reported by Tom Decent of The Sydney Morning Herald that Jones had held a Zoom interview with the Japan Rugby Football Union (JRFU) for the position of head coach. The Sydney Morning Herald cited anonymous sources with knowledge of negotiations that claimed Jones took an online Zoom interview with JRFU officials on August 25, fifteen days before Australia's opening game of the 2023 Rugby World Cup. Following the loss to Wales, Jones was questioned about the alleged interview and his commitment to Australian rugby. He stated in the post-match press conference: "I'm committed to coaching Australia. I really take umbrage that people are questioning my commitment to coaching Australia. To doubt my commitment to the job is a bit red hot." After Australia's exit from the 2023 Rugby World Cup Jones continually denied he was involved in an interview with the JRFU, and spoke to The Sydney Morning Herald's Peter FitzSimons to add: "It's false... There's no named source for these stories, so there's no credibility about the story to start with. Secondly, the president of Japan Rugby happens to be a very close associate of mine. Every time I go to Japan, I have coffee with him. We talk about rugby. Have I met Japanese representatives? Yes. But I have done that for 30 years." In the same interview Jones said the last JRFU official he had spoken to was in February 2023. In May 2025, Jones said that he was asked by the JRFU for his views on who should take the head coach position of Japan, and that any interviews he had with the JRFU took place after he resigned from the role with Australia.

On 29 October 2023, Jones resigned as coach of Australia.

=== Return to Japan (2023) ===
In December 2023, the Japan Rugby Football Union announced Jones's re-appointment as its head coach, a position he had previously held from 2012 to 2015.

== International coaching statistics ==
As of 11 July 2026.

Team	Years	Played	Won	Drawn	Lost	Win %	For	Against
Australia	2001–2005	57	33	1	23	57.89	1,741	1,151
Japan	2012–2015	48	34	1	13	70.83	1,913	785
England	2015–2022	81	59	2	20	72.84	2,382	1,385
Australia	2023	9	2	0	7	22.22	177	270
Japan	2024–	23	9	0	14	39.13	638	758
Total		218	137	4	77	62.84	6,851	4,350

== Other ventures ==
In November 2015 Jones was appointed by Goldman Sachs Group Inc. to the bank's advisory board in Japan.

Between May and September 2020, Jones co-hosted England Rugby's Eddie Jones Coaching Podcast alongside RFU Director of Performance Conor O'Shea. The podcast covered various topics around rugby, including tactics, coaching influences, various different personalities, and coaching inspiration from other sports like cricket and football. It also featured many notable guests, such as Justin Langer, Joe Schmidt, Michael Lynagh, Joe Roff, John Gallagher, Scott Wisemantel, and Danny Kerry.

Upon his return to the role of head coach of Australia, Jones began a podcast co-hosted with former journalist David Pembroke, called EDDIE. The podcast ran from February to April 2023 before taking an indefinite hiatus. The podcast returned in May 2025 under the new name Rugby Unity. Eddie continues to co-host the podcast alongside David Pembroke and former player and rugby union coach Ewen McKenzie.

== Popular culture ==
Jones is featured in the documentary Eddie Jones: Rugby, Japan and Me, which aired on Sky Sports on 31 October 2018.

New Zealand actor Temuera Morrison portrays Jones in the 2019 film The Brighton Miracle.

== Honours ==
=== Coach ===
Brumbies

- Super Rugby: 2001
- Australian Provincial Championship: 1999

Australia

- Tri Nations Series: 2001

Suntory Sungoliath

- Top League: 2011–12
- All-Japan Rugby Football Championship: 2012

Japan

- Asian Five Nations: 2012, 2013, 2014, 2015
- Pacific Nations Cup: 2014 (Asia-Pacific Conference)

England

- Six Nations Championship: 2016, 2017, 2020
- Autumn Nations Cup: 2020

== Notes ==
Sporting positions
Preceded by (Australia) Rod Macqueen	Australia National Rugby Union Coach; 2001–2005	Succeeded by (Australia) John Connolly
Preceded by (New Zealand) John Kirwan	Japan National Rugby Union Coach; 2012–2015	Succeeded by (Japan) Ryuji Nakatake (Interim) (New Zealand) Mark Hammett
Preceded by (England) Stuart Lancaster	England National Rugby Union Coach; 2015–2022	Succeeded by (England) Steve Borthwick
Preceded by (New Zealand) Dave Rennie	Australia National Rugby Union Coach; 2023	Succeeded by (New Zealand) Joe Schmidt
Preceded by (New Zealand) Jamie Joseph	Japan National Rugby Union Coach; 2024–present	Succeeded by Incumbent
