= Pearl Hyde =

English politician (1904–1963)

Official portrait as Lord Mayor by William Dring.

Pearl Marguerite Hyde MBE (17 June 1904 – 1963, née Bigby) was an English local Labour politician and the first female Lord Mayor of Coventry.

== Personal life ==
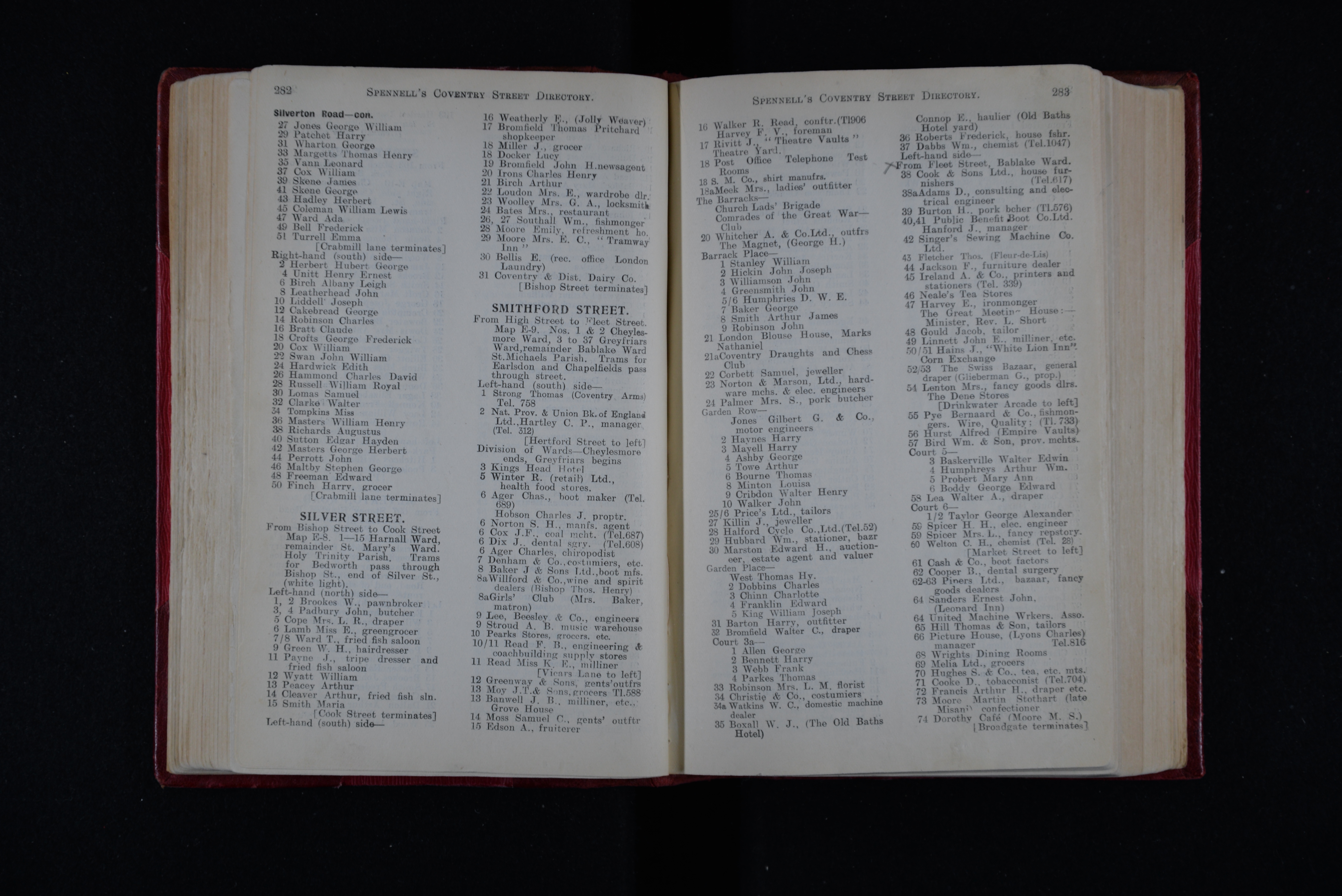
Coventry Trade Directory 1921-22 JN 910 at Coventry Archives in the Herbert Art Gallery and Museum, Coventry.

She was born in North London to Harman and Ellen Bigby, on 17 June 1904. Her father was a publican and was landlord of the Vine Inn in Waltham Cross at the time of his death in a motor accident when Pearl was just 13. Her mother had died five years earlier. She moved to Birmingham to live with a married older brother and an uncle, and then in 1920 moved to Coventry, to the White Lion Inn at 50-51 Smithford Street run by a family friend J Haines, where she learned the licensed trade. She married Walter Eric Hyde in 1923 and they had one son, Eric Hyde. She died on 15 April 1963 while on holiday in Crawford, Lanarkshire, Scotland when a car she was driving collided with a lorry.

== Political career ==
Hyde joined the Labour party in 1931, and helped establish a maternity and child welfare clinic in the Westwood area during the 1930s. She was elected to Coventry Council for the Walsgrave ward from 14 December 1937, after standing for election unsuccessfully three times in the Westwood ward. She became an alderman on 7 October 1952 and the city's first female lord mayor in 1957, with her daughter-in-law Elizabeth Hyde as her lady mayoress. She dedicated her time as Lord Mayor to ‘the women of Coventry’.

During her term as Lord Mayor, she established international links for Coventry in Europe, visiting the cities of Lidice in Poland and Dresden in Germany. She also visited Toronto in Canada, where she toured Ontario Hydro and met the United States Consul in the Umbrella Club, Birmingham, as part of 'America Week'.

She was also active in promoting cultural and leisure activities in the city. She set up a trust in 1958 to fundraise for a canal boat to provide leisure rides for elderly residents, with the boat named Pearl Hyde in her honour. When the Belgrade Theatre opened in 1958, she said that she hoped that it would end Coventry's reputation as a 'burial place for culture.'

== Voluntary work ==
Hyde was leader of Coventry's Women's Voluntary Services, based at Drapers' Hall on Bailey Lane, during World War II, and afterwards until 1958. Her work involved providing sustenance through mobile canteens or restaurants, distributing clothing and Red Cross parcels, organising accommodation for foreign servicemen and people stranded in the city, sewing and visiting air raid shelters. She ran her 'Devil's Kitchen' from an underground room in the Coventry Central Police Station to provide free food in the city and even learnt to drive an ambulance when volunteer drivers were needed. She was considered 'a powerful force in stimulating morale' after the devastation of the Coventry Blitz and a 'forceful but likeable character.'

In 1941, Hyde appeared in Humphrey Jennings' documentary The Heart of Britain, saying: "You know you feel such fools standing there in a crater with a mug of tea —seeing men bringing out bodies. You feel useless, until you know that there’s someone there actually in that bombed house who is alive you can give tea to. And then to hear the praises of the men themselves—that tea's jolly good—just washed the blood and dust out of my mouth. And we feel that we really have done a job, and a useful job." This made her a minor celebrity, with her fame even spreading to the United States through syndicated newspaper features in 1943.

She was appointed a Member of the Order of the British Empire (MBE) for her services during the Coventry Blitz of 1940 and received a diploma from Charles De Gaulle in 1949 for her war work. In 1948 she was invited to a tea party held at St. James's Palace by the Queen Mother, in honour of her wartime work. She recognised Hyde from a visit to Coventry in November 1940, and said 'I remember your delightful cup of tea'.

On 25 May 1962 she attended the consecration of the new Coventry Cathedral, to cheers from the crowd.

== Other work ==
From 1943 to 1959 Hyde worked as welfare officer at Lea Francis Cars, and from 1960 as a public relations executive with ATV. She also worked for Massey Ferguson.

== Legacy ==
At her funeral in Coventry Cathedral in 1963 the Bishop of Coventry called her 'one of the most outstanding citizens Coventry has ever had'.

Hyde is remembered in the name of Pearl Hyde Primary School in her former ward of Walsgrave, Coventry. In 2015, school pupils were interviewed by the BBC Coventry and Warwickshire radio station about Pearl and her role during the Blitz.

A portrait painting of her by William Dring, a portrait photograph and a handbag which she owned are in the collection of the Herbert Art Gallery and Museum in Coventry.

In 2015 the Coventry Telegraph named Hyde as one of "50 heroes of Coventry and Warwickshire" alongside William Shakespeare, Lady Godiva and Ken Loach. In 2017 she was also included in Coventry Live's list of the most influential Coventry and Warwickshire women.

A 48-minute archive film of Hyde's mayoral year is catalogued at the Media Archive for Central England: although the video is unavailable as of November 2018, the listing of contents indicates the breadth of Hyde's activities that year.

In October 2023 Hyde was featured in the last episode of Jay Blades' channel 5 TV show The Midlands Through Time, with her life story told by historian Dr Sarah Louise Miller during an interview in the Old Cathedral ruins.
