= Belgrade Theatre =

Theatre in Coventry, England

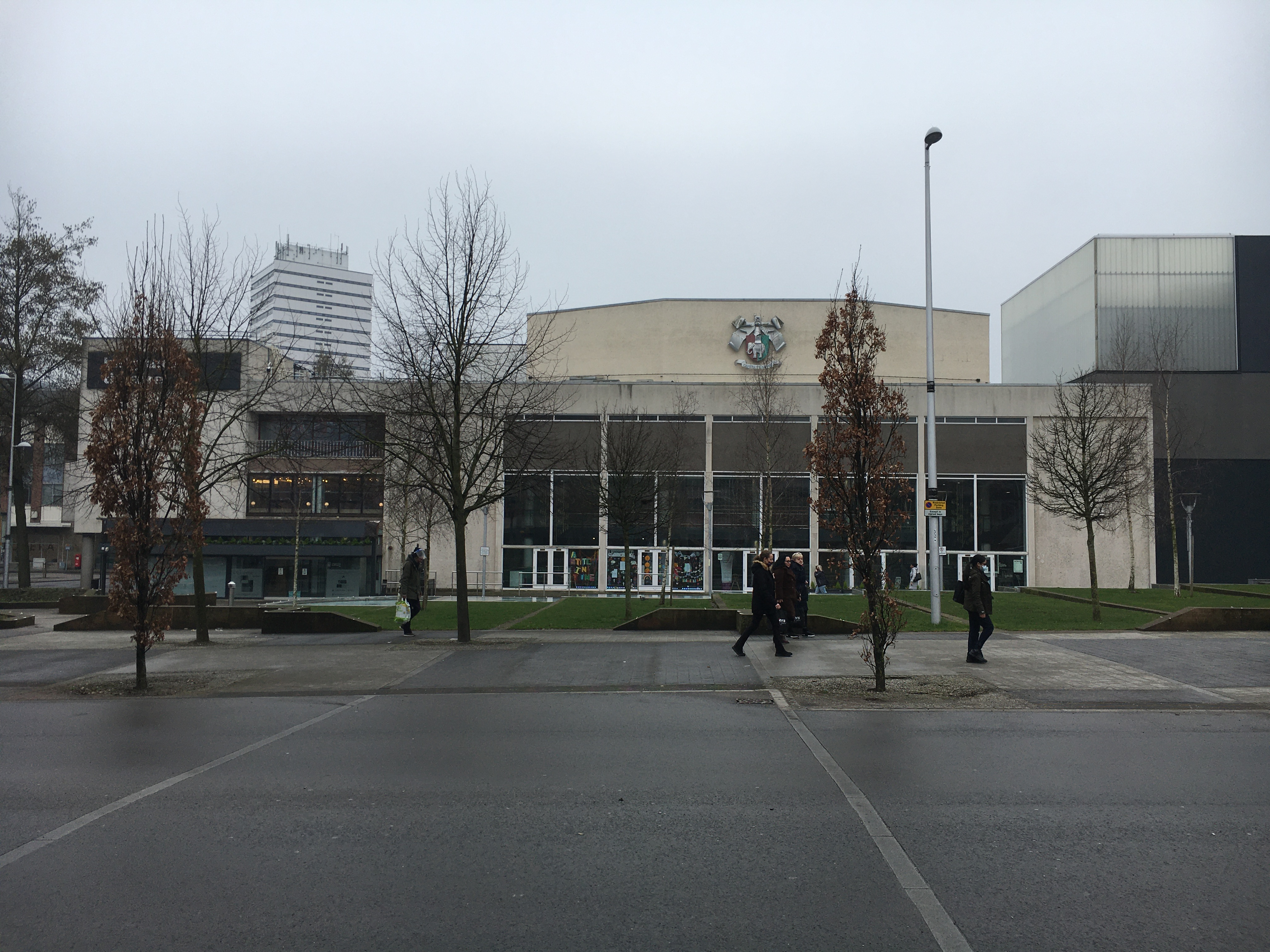
- The Belgrade Theatre in 2021
- Interactive map of Belgrade Theatre
- Address: Corporation Street; Coventry, West Midlands; England
- Coordinates: 52.409766°N 1.514294°W
- Designation: Grade II listed (12 June 1998)

Construction
- Opened: 1958; 68 years ago
- Architect: Arthur Ling

Website
- www.belgrade.co.uk

The Belgrade Theatre is a live performance venue in Coventry, England. It was the first civic theatre to be built in Britain after the Second World War and is now a Grade II listed building.

== Background ==
Coventry was the fastest-growing city in Britain between the First and Second World Wars. Its cramped medieval streets were becoming dangerously congested and overcrowded, and in 1938 the City Council appointed Donald Gibson to become the first city architect. The newly created City Architect's Department had ambitious plans, and the devastation of the Coventry Blitz allowed it more freedom to design an entirely new city centre. In 1955, Gibson resigned; extensive work had already taken place in the city centre, but a growing Coventry required further development. The person who took over from him, Arthur Ling, would later design the Belgrade Theatre.

Some versions of the overall plan for the city centre included three new theatres and cinemas, but during the 1950s it became clear that this would not be viable. Two pre-war cinemas were still operating in the city centre, and audiences were falling. It was decided to build a single new theatre on the corner of Corporation Street and Upper Well Street.

== History ==
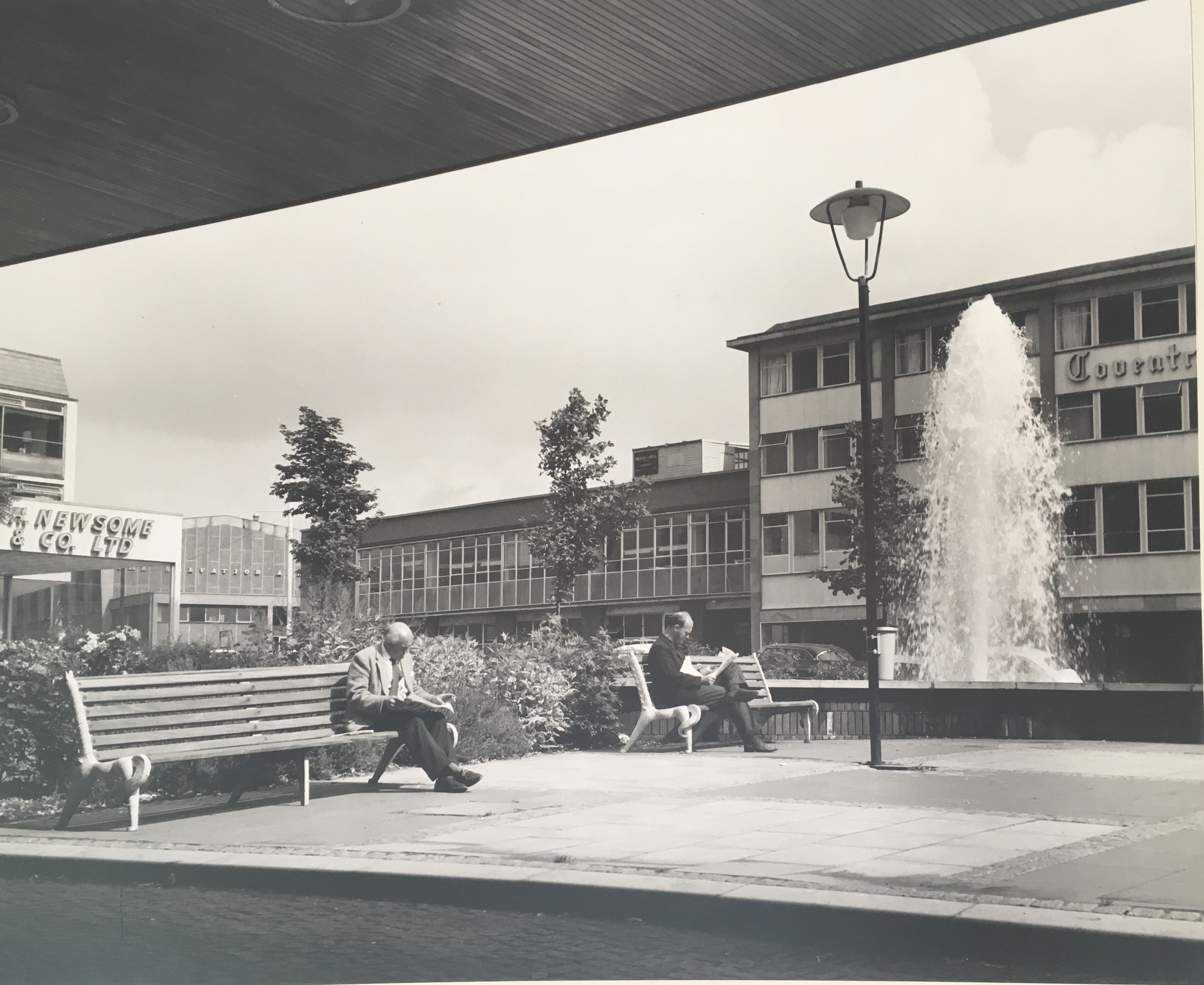
View from Belgrade Theatre entrance, September 1964

The first steps of construction took place in 1952, when Coventry's twin city of Belgrade, Yugoslavia (now in Serbia), pledged a gift of beech timber for use in the new theatre. The theatre is named after this city. The Yugoslavian ambassador, Ivo Vejvoda, visited the construction site in 1957; during the same trip, he also opened an exhibition of modern Yugoslavian art at the Herbert Gallery. In the same year, the Arts Council announced that they would give financial support to the City Council to equip the new theatre, which was going over budget.

The Belgrade opened at 8 pm on 27 March 1958, with the Duchess of Kent presiding over a ceremony attended by many "civic personalities and representatives of the theatre world", including Sir Kenneth Clark and Sam Wanamaker. Coventry's first female Lord Mayor, Pearl Hyde, gave an address of welcome and thanks to the Duchess from the Royal box before the first show began, Half in Earnest by Vivian Ellis.

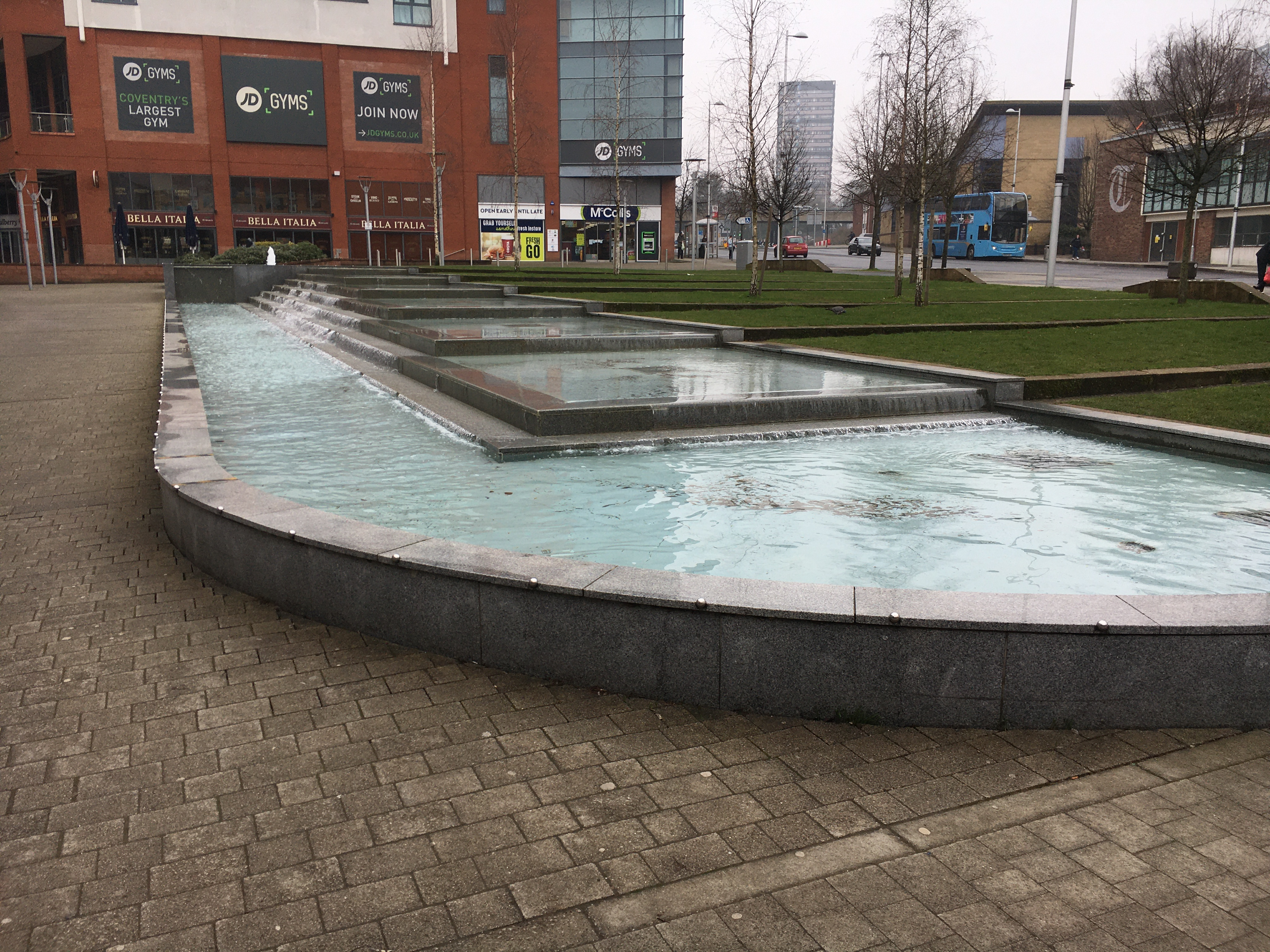
The fountain in Belgrade Square

Under Bryan Bailey, the theatre's first director, the Belgrade's resident company was established. This was the first Coventry-based theatre company since the Midland Theatre Company was disbanded by the Arts Council in 1957, and it produced the premieres of the "Wesker trilogy" (Chicken Soup with Barley, Roots and I'm Talking About Jerusalem) by Arnold Wesker. In the 1960s, Belgrade developed the innovative Theatre in Education concept, beginning with its project Pow Wow. This involved a group of children, who were encouraged to form a relationship with a cowboy. They were then introduced to an American Indian who was being kept in a cage as a prisoner, and given more information about the characters and their views. In the end, the children had to decide whether to free the prisoner. This blend of theatre and education had never been seen before.

The theatre received several grants for maintenance and renovation through the 1980s and 1990s, before a major refurbishment was announced as part of Coventry's Millennium project. It was closed in 2006 for extensive building work, including the addition of a new performance space, which took ten months longer than expected, but was completed fully funded at a total cost of around £14 million. The theatre eventually reopened on 22 September 2007 with a performance of Mr Puntila and His Man Matti. Prince Edward opened the new B2 studio performance area on 4 February 2008, the 50th anniversary year of Belgrade's inaugural performance. A further capital project to expand and upgrade facilities (architects Corstorphine & Wright) was completed, fully funded in 2021 despite the Pandemic, with an adjacent shop seamlessly absorbed into the footprint, resulting in an enlarged, stylish cafe and a glamorous new first-floor bar called 1958.

== UK City of Culture 2021 ==
Led by Hamish Glen as artistic director (2003–2021), the Belgrade was involved in the bid for Coventry to become UK City of Culture 2021, which it won in December 2017. Scenes of jubilation erupted at the theatre where Coventrians had gathered to hear the announcement of the winner. Three co-artistic directors were appointed for the City of Culture year: Justine Themen, Corey Campbell and Balisha Karra. They were to oversee the producing programme for 2021, "providing an opportunity for a new generation of creative talent to explore their own ideas about how to take the industry forward". On 3 March 2021, it was announced that two producers would join the creative team for 2021: Sâmir Bhamra and Krysztina Winkel. Bhamra praised the theatre for its "commitment [to] ensuring diverse voices are at the heart of the team leading its produced programme for 2021".

=== 2021 Spring Season ===
The Belgrade's 2021 Spring Season ran from March to July with a mix of drama, musicals, and live music.

Start date	End date	Event	Description
1 April 2021		RUSH	Reggae music
3 April 2021		80s Mania	80s music
19 April 2021	24 April 2021	SIX	Musical
26 April 2021	1 May 2021	Groan Ups	Comedy
6 May 2021		Magic of Motown	Motown music
10 May 2021	15 May 2021	Looking Good Dead	Drama
26 May 2021	30 May 2021	Friendsical	Musical comedy
2 June 2021		Justin Live	Children's show
8 June 2021	12 June 2021	Dial M for Murder	Drama
15 June 2021	17 June 2021	The Comedy of Errors	Comedy
22 June 2021		Bond in Concert	Film music
3 July 2021		The Greatest Showman	Sing-along screening
3 July 2021		The Rocky Horror Picture Show	Sing-along screening
17 July 2021		Calling Planet Earth	New Romantic music

=== Events in collaboration with Coventry UK City of Culture ===
The Belgrade collaborated with the Coventry UK City of Culture Trust to produce several events in 2021. These included a series of performances in the Roundabout pop-up theatre as well as online and outdoor performances such as Can You Hear Me, Now? and Like There's No Tomorrow.

== Design and construction ==
The Coventry City Architect's Department, under Donald Gibson, produced a model in 1944 showing three interlinked theatres and cinemas arranged radially around a quarter-circle–shaped car park, centred roughly on the site of the Belgrade. Through the late 1940s and early 1950s, it became increasingly clear that only one theatre was needed, so Arthur Ling began work on the building that stands there today. The south-east elevation is reminiscent of Gibson's Broadgate House (1948–53), with an arcade of shopfronts beneath a brick-clad block of flats for visiting actors, and regular square windows framed in pale stone. However, Ling departed from Gibson's theme for the rest of the building, giving it a northeast flank of Portland stone and glass. The north-east elevation faces Belgrade Square, an open area with a fountain and some green space. When originally built, the theatre had a covered entrance for people arriving in vehicles, which has since been removed.

Ling used beech timber gifted from Belgrade to panel the inside of the auditorium, which was fitted out in the style of the Royal Festival Hall. The Russian architect Arkady Mordvinov visited in 1958 and praised the theatre's "intimate note" as well as the quality of the auditorium's acoustics.

The extension opened in 2008 was designed by Stanton Williams, "contrasting [the] use of coloured renders and translucent panels" to "signal [...] presence within an evolving cityscape". It consists of a new seven-storey block to the north-west of the existing theatre containing a 300-seat auditorium and additional rehearsal space. Its form and size aim to "[respond] to the scale of an adjacent new mixed-use development". The extension won a RIBA National award in 2008, and was described as "stunning" and "imposing" by the British Theatre Guide in 2007.

== Belgrade Square ==
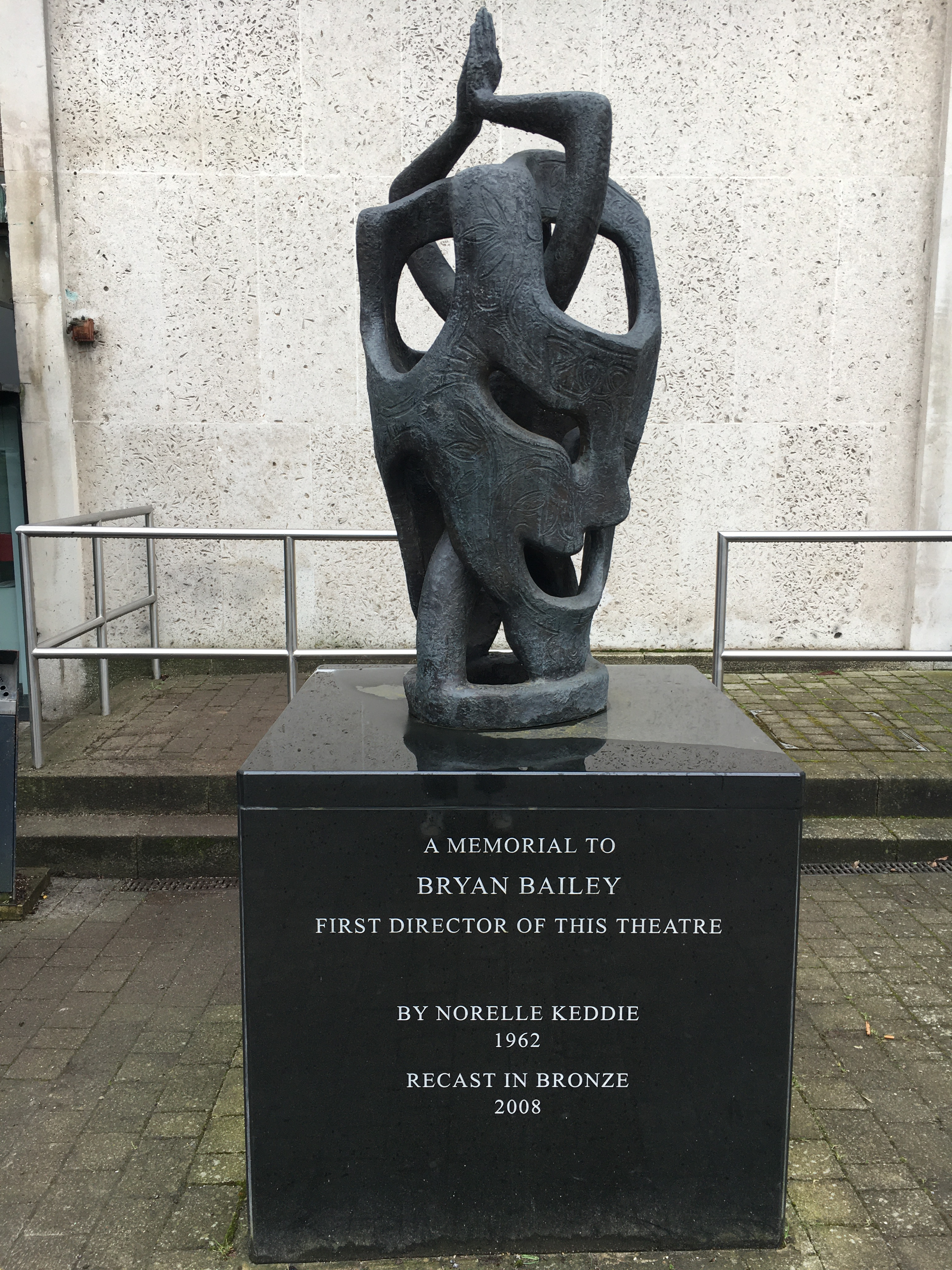
A Memorial to Bryan Bailey outside the Belgrade

Belgrade Square sits with the theatre to its south-east, and is faced by the Telegraph hotel from the north-east. It contains a fountain of rectangular stepped pools and two sculptures.

=== A Memorial to Bryan Bailey ===
52.40985°N 1.51385°W
A Memorial to Bryan Bailey is a sculpture by Norelle Keddie, originally produced in 1962. It commemorates the death of Bryan Bailey, the theatre's first director, in a 1960 car crash. It was recast in bronze and placed on its current plinth in 2008. It sits between the fountain and the front of the theatre.

=== Two Sides of a Woman ===
52.41017°N 1.51433°W
Two Sides of a Woman is a bronze sculpture by Helaine Blumenfeld, acquired by Coventry City in 1986. It sits to the west of the fountain in a raised bed.

== Management ==
The Belgrade is run by the Belgrade Theatre Trust, a registered charity (number 219163) controlled by a board of trustees. The trust's objectives, as stated in its memorandum of association, are to "promote, maintain, improve and advance education, particularly by the production of educational plays and the encouragement of the arts". The trust's income was around £7.1 million in the 2019–20 financial year, predominantly from donations and charitable activities.

== Staff ==
- Management
  - Chief Executive Laura Elliot
  - Creative Director Corey Campbell
- Trustees
  - Stewart Fergusson – Chair
  - Nathaniel Dodzo
  - Roger Bailey
  - Annette Hay
  - Hamish Glen
  - Alan Pollock
  - Jonathan James Wilby
  - Tony Skipper
  - Sheila Anne Bates
  - Joanna Reid
  - Paul Carvell

== See also ==
- Royal Festival Hall – live performance venue in London, which was designed in the same period and inspired the Belgrade's auditorium
- Coventry Central Baths – another Coventry building designed by Ling
- One Night in November – play by Alan Pollock, premiered at the theatre in 2008
