= Coundon, Coventry =

Suburb in Coventry, West Midlands, England

Coordinates: 52.422°N 1.536°W

Coundon
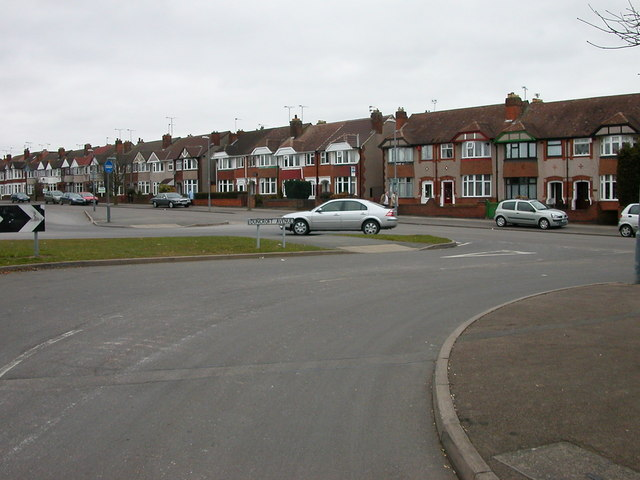

- Location within the West Midlands
- Metropolitan borough: Coventry
- Metropolitan county: West Midlands
- Region: West Midlands
- Country: England
- Sovereign state: United Kingdom
- Police: West Midlands
- Fire: West Midlands
- Ambulance: West Midlands

Coundon is a predominantly residential suburb in north-west Coventry, in the county of the West Midlands, England.

Along with the neighbouring Keresley, Coundon was originally a village in the Warwickshire countryside. By the 1930s it had been incorporated into the city of Coventry after mass housebuilding took place to accommodate the city's growing population.

== History ==
Coundon was one of the few villages that are now part of Coventry to be mentioned in the Domesday Book (1086). Holy Trinity Church had land in Coundon from at least the early 14th century. In 1410–11 Coundon was divided into Old, or Little Coundon, and New Coundon and it was part of the Knightlow Hundred until 1451.

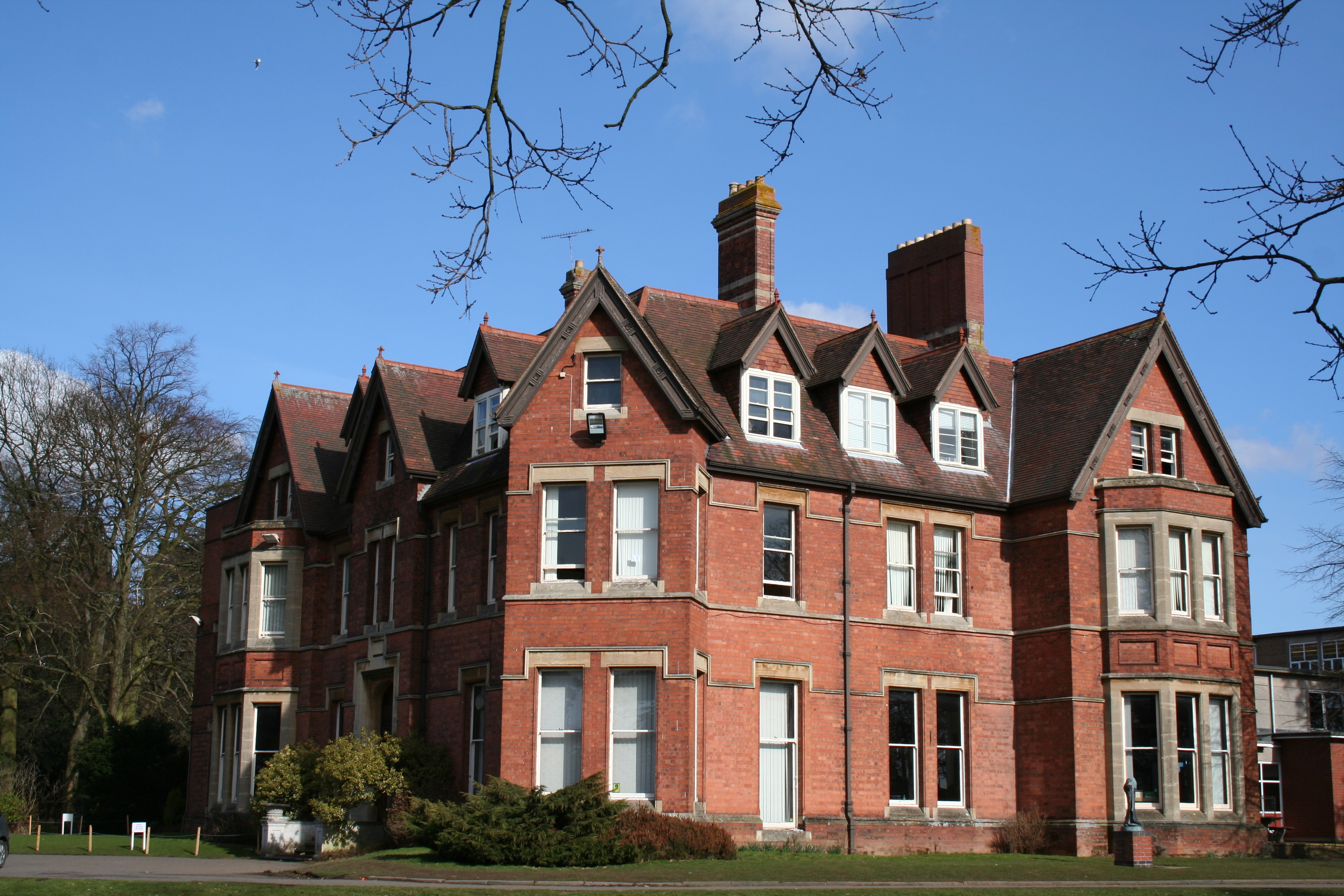
Old House, Coundon Court School

Coundon was described as a parish in 1801 and 1811 and as a hamlet until 1881. The cycle manufacturer George Singer of Singer & Co built Coundon Court on land that was formerly part of Coundon Farm in 1891. It was constructed in the Victorian Gothic style. The house is now part of the site of Coundon Court Secondary School and is referred to as 'The Old House'.

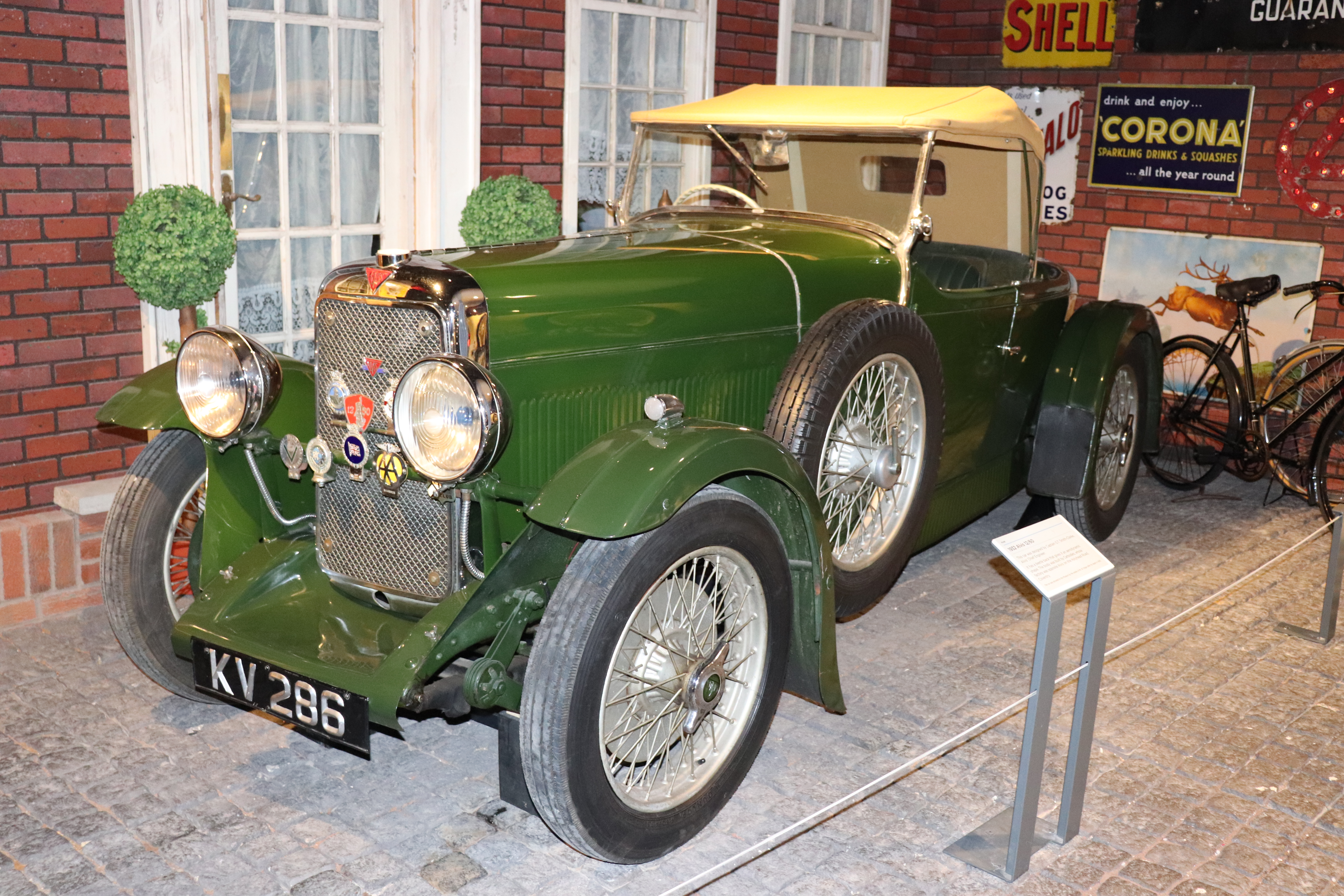
1932 Alvis on display at Coventry Transport Museum

Alvis Motors opened its first factory on the Holyhead Road in Coundon, in 1919 and originally produced stationary engines and motor scooters. It expanded to produce four-cylinder engines, six-cylinder engines, and large six-cylinder cars so a larger car factory was built on a 29-acre site. During the Coventry Blitz in World War Two the larger factory was severely damaged by the German Luftwaffe's bombing and car production was then suspended until 1946. In 1965 Alvis came under the control of Rover, and production was moved out of Coventry in 1999. Alvis employed around 2,400 people at its peak. The site of the former factory in Coundon is now the Alvis Retail Park.

Coundon was formerly in the parish of Holy Trinity, until 1866 when Coundon became a separate civil parish. On 1 April 1932 the parish was abolished and merged with Coventry and Keresley. In 1931 the parish had a population of 364.

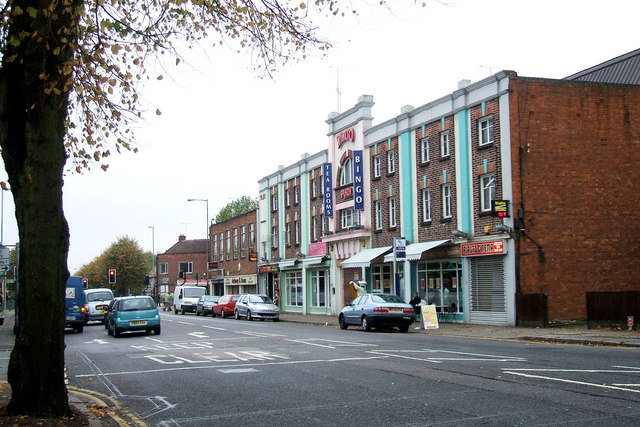
Rialto Bingo in 2007

The Rialto picture house was opened on Moseley Avenue in 1928, showing silent films with accompaniment by a pianist and small orchestra of two violins, two double bass, trumpet, trombone and drums on one level of the building, and with a ballroom on another level of the building. The cinema was destroyed in the Coventry Blitz but the ballroom survived and became the Rialto Bingo Club, then the Rialto Plaza which hosted live music events. It operated as the Neighbourhood Social in 2024.

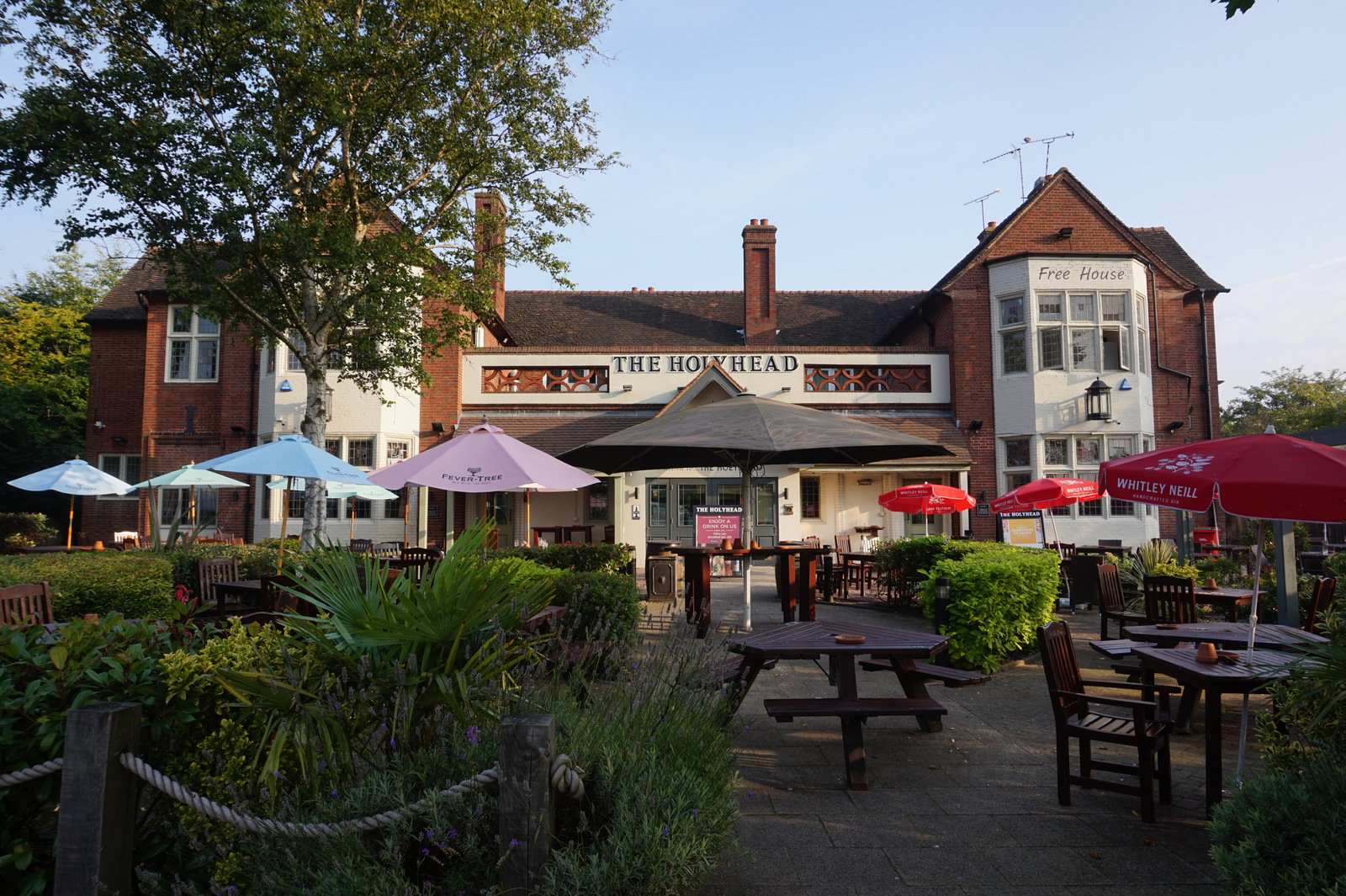
The Holyhead Public House in 2019

The Holyhead Pub began operating in 1929 on the Holyhead Road, the coaching road from London to Holyhead. The Nugget Pub was built in 1938 in anticipation of housing development on Coundon Wedge, which never happened.

From 1951 to 2005, Coundon was the location of the Browns Lane Jaguar car factory, which for its first 47 years was the carmaker's only plant. Upon its closure in 2005, production of cars was split between factories in Castle Bromwich and Halewood. The Browns Lane plant was largely demolished in 2008, although part of the site remains under Jaguar ownership, some is now used by a vehicle interiors manufacturer, and the American company Amazon has set up a distribution warehouse on the site.

== Amenities ==
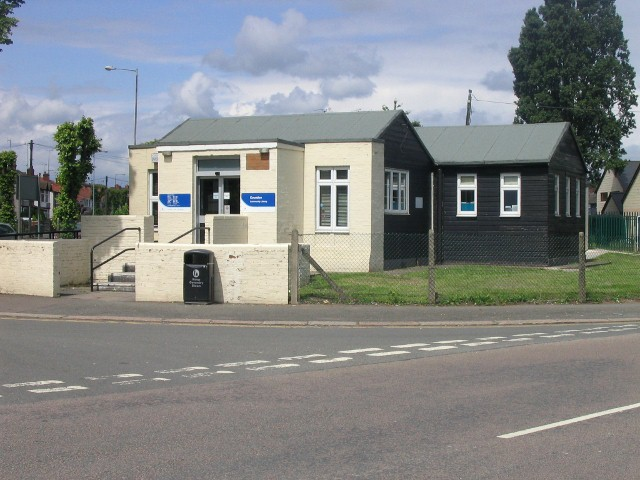
Coundon Community Library in 2008

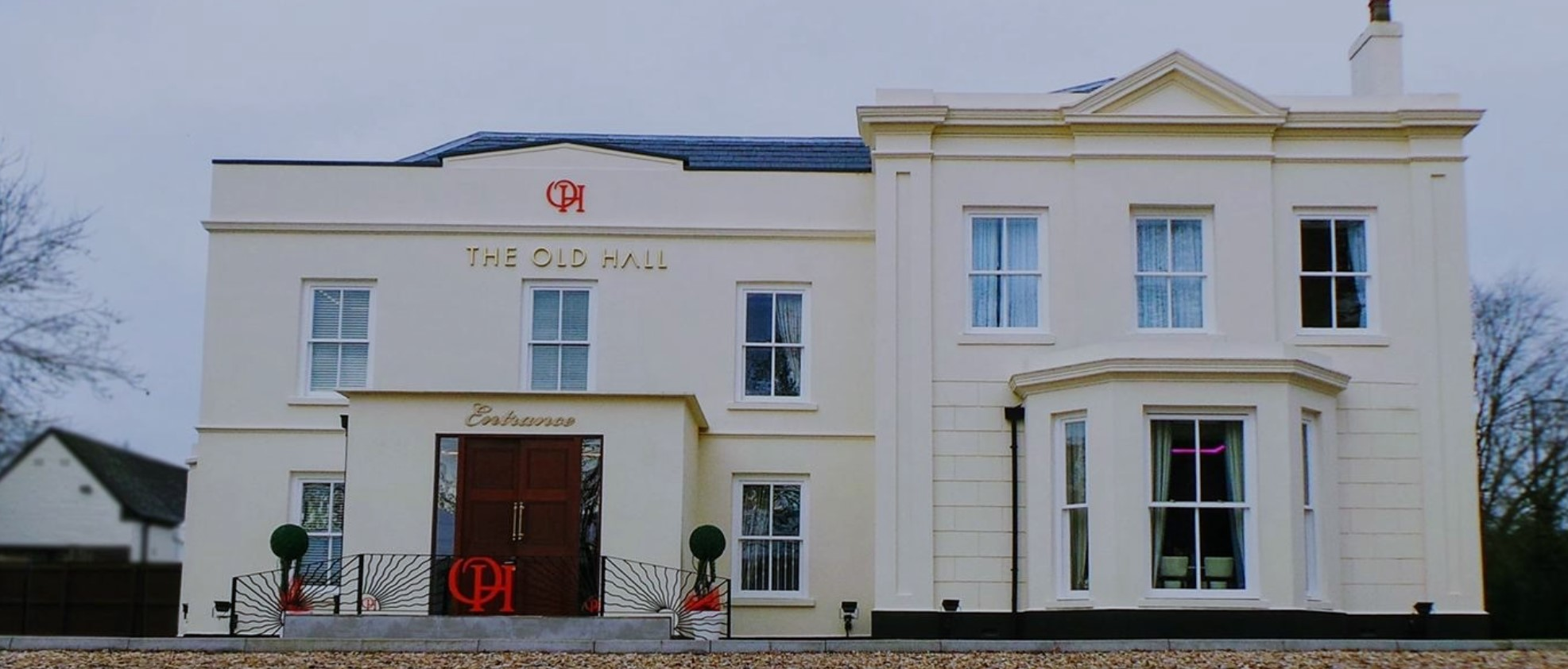
Old Hall Hotel

- Coundon Community Library, open Monday to Saturday.
- Coundon Community Peace Orchard at Coundon Hall Park.
- Coundon Wedge, an open space that forms a wedge of open land between the built up residential areas of Coundon and Allesley.
- The Old Hall Hotel, an 1840s country house, which is now a wedding venue with a restaurant and bar facilities.

== Schools ==
- Coundon Primary School
- Hollyfast Primary School
- Mosely Primary School
- Christ the King Infant and Junior Schools (separated into different locations)
- Coundon Court Secondary School.

The playing fields of Bablake School, an independent school, are located in Coundon.

== Politics ==
Coundon is split across two wards, Sherbourne ward to the South West and Bablake ward to the North. Three councillors represent each ward, three of whom are members of the Labour Party. In Bablake ward, there are two Conservative Party Councillors and one Independent.

In general elections Coundon falls within the constituency of Coventry North West, which returns one Member of Parliament. Taiwo Owatemi of the Labour Party was re-elected as the constituency's Member of Parliament in 2024.
