= Coundon Court =

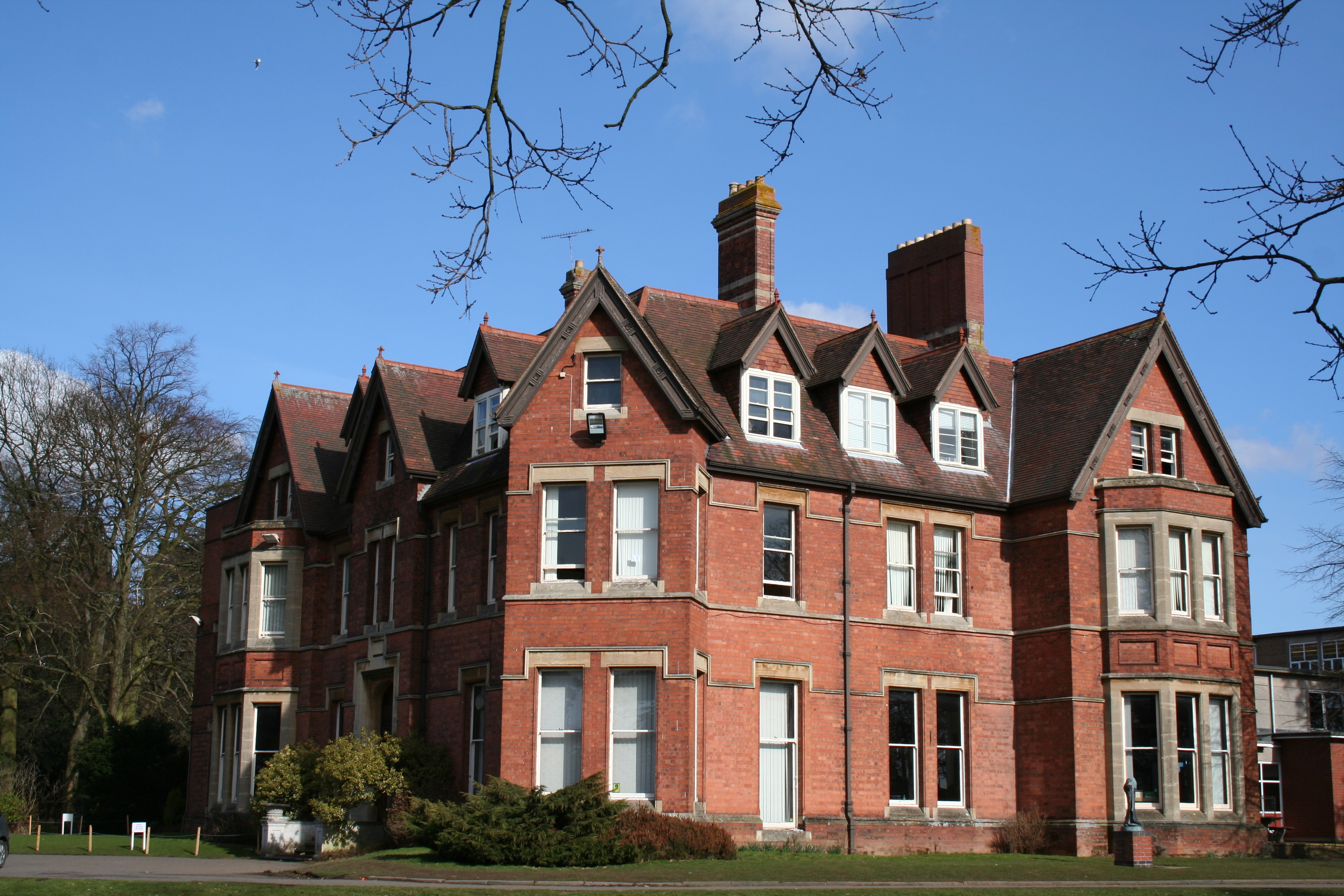
- The Old House

Location
- Northbrook Road; Coventry, West Midlands, CV6 2AJ; England; 52.4297°N 1.5436°W

Information
- Type: Academy
- Motto: "In minimis fidelis"
- Established: 1953
- Local authority: Coventry
- Department for Education URN: 138023 Tables
- Ofsted: Reports
- Chair: Joanne Doyle
- Principal: Chris Heal
- Gender: Coeducational
- Age: 11 to 18
- Enrolment: 1,800 (approx.)
- Colours: Black/Red
- Website: http://www.coundoncourt.org/

Coundon Court is an all-inclusive Academy in Coundon, Coventry, England. The Headteacher is Chris Heal. It is located in the northwestern suburbs of Coventry, adjacent to the open countryside of the Coundon Wedge.

As of June 2021, the school has approximately 1800 enrolled students. The school serves an age range from 11 to 18, being a fully comprehensive school serving students from areas surrounding and including the centre of Coventry. The school converted to an academy in April 2012 retaining the name and staff of the predecessor school.

The academy is currently undergoing a school rebuild which is funded by the Department for Education.

== History ==
The Old House, a locally listed building, was originally the home of George Singer (1847–1909), who had the mansion built in 1890–91. The school opened on the site in 1953 as an all girls comprehensive school.

Over time, as the number of students increased, the original buildings proved to be too small and the school was extended – with the Home Economics Block (which later became the Post 16 Centre), School Hall (circa 1954), the North Block (constructed circa 1955–56) and the South Block. A Physical Education block with swimming pool and 2 sports halls was constructed.

A section of the Old House was damaged by fire in 1956 and subsequently rebuilt.

In 2007, a new Performing Arts and Post 16 Centres were built. In 2016, a new four-court sports hall was opened.

The school is currently undergoing a school rebuild which will see an introduction of 3 new teaching blocks.

== Recent achievements ==
Coundon Court has a number of key characteristics and achievements

- There is strong community support especially from parents and local stakeholders.
- Coundon Court is a lead school both nationally and locally.
- The school has held Technology specialism (since 1997), Leading Edge status (since 2003) and Training School Status (since 2000).
- It is now part of a Teaching School Alliance (April 2012).
- Coundon Court is an SSAT Leadership and Innovation support hub school (commenced 2010).
- SSAT STEMNET Hub School (since 2010).
- Regional Achievement for All hub school (since 2010).
- Coventry Applied Learning Hub School (since 2008).
- Coventry and Warwickshire ELP hub school (since 2009).
- Coventry and Warwickshire Social Enterprise hub school (since 2010).
- Midlands Culture and Arts hub school (since 2012)
- QCDA and Bowlands exemplar school.
- Early Years consultancy school for Coventry and NVQ training unit for Early Years.
- Part of the West Federation Partnership Plus for Teaching and Learning.
- Coventry lead school on professional development for NQTs, RQTs and Middle leader training.
- Enhanced Partnership school with Warwick University for Initial Teacher Training.
- School Direct training institution.
- Initial Teacher Training provider for numerous HE institutions.
- Sports mark Gold awarded for the provision of extra curricular sport
- Arts mark Gold for outstanding provision in the Arts (renewed 2012)
- Internationalism Award (2011)
- Healthy Schools award.
- Investors in Careers award (2011)
- Involve award (2011)
- Go for it Gold award (2011)

The 1994 OFSTED report commented that they were "a caring community" within which "the feeling of welcome and care is in evidence everywhere". A second OFSTED report in 1998 highlighted their progress in standards of achievement "which are significantly better than the average achieved nationally". In 2008 and again in 2009 Ofsted commented on the outstanding leadership of the school and the excellent academic standards of students.

In 2014 Ofsted rated the academy as 'Requires improvement'.

In 2016, Ofsted rated the academy as 'Good'.

In 2023, Ofsted rated the academy as 'Good’.

The school has a community football team – Coundon Court F.C. founded in 2002, Coventry's only FA charter standard development club.

== Head teachers ==
- Miss E M Foster
- Mr N Anderton
- Mr K Reynolds
- Mr D Kershaw
- Mr J Vickers
- Mrs D Morrison
- Mr A Clay
- Mr C Heal

== Alumni ==
- Mo Mowlam (1949–2005), British politician
- Steve Beaton (born 1964), English professional darts player
- Nitin Ganatra (born 1968), EastEnders actor
- Russell Haswell (born 1970), English multidisciplinary artist and noise musician
- Leon Lloyd (born 1977), retired English rugby union footballer, Leicester Tigers
- Jim Hamilton (born 1982), Scottish rugby union footballer
- Jordan Clarke (born 1991), Coventry City footballer
- Conor Thomas (born 1993), Coventry City footballer
- Jack Cosgrove (born 1994), professional rugby player
- Kier Starmer (born 1962) former prime minister of the United Kingdom.
