= Old Wheatleyans RFC =

English rugby union club, based in Coventry, England

(England) Old Wheatleyans
- Full name: Old Wheatleyans Rugby Football Club
- Union: Warwickshire RFU
- Nickname: Wheats
- Founded: 1928; 98 years ago
- Location: Coundon, Coventry West Midlands, England
- Ground: Bablake Playing Fields (Capacity: 450 ( standing ) , 26 seating)
- Coach: Joshua Loach-Smith
- Captain: Liam McCrea
- League: Midlands 4 West (South)
- 2019–20: 5th

Official website
- www.pitchero.com/clubs/oldwheatleyans/

Old Wheatleyans RFC or Old Wheats is an English rugby union club based in Coundon, Coventry. It was formed by former pupils of Bablake School who continue to supply a large proportion of the current playing strength.

The club practices and plays its home games at the Bablake Playing Fields. It shares these facilities with Christ The King Football Club, Bablake School and other clubs. The club gained promotion to Midlands 4 West South division in the penultimate game of the season 2010–2011 against local rivals Coventrians. In the following season, 2011–2012, the club finished first and its back-to-back promotions saw it elevated to Midlands 3 West South.

In 2012, the club also won the Midland Junior Vase beating Bloxwich 11–3 in the final, before being narrowly beaten in the national semi-final by Baildon RFC, who went on to win the national final.

== Club honours ==
- Midlands 4 West (South) champions: 2011–12
- RFU Midlands Junior Vase champions: 2011-12
