= Jim Hamilton (rugby union) =

Scotland international rugby union player

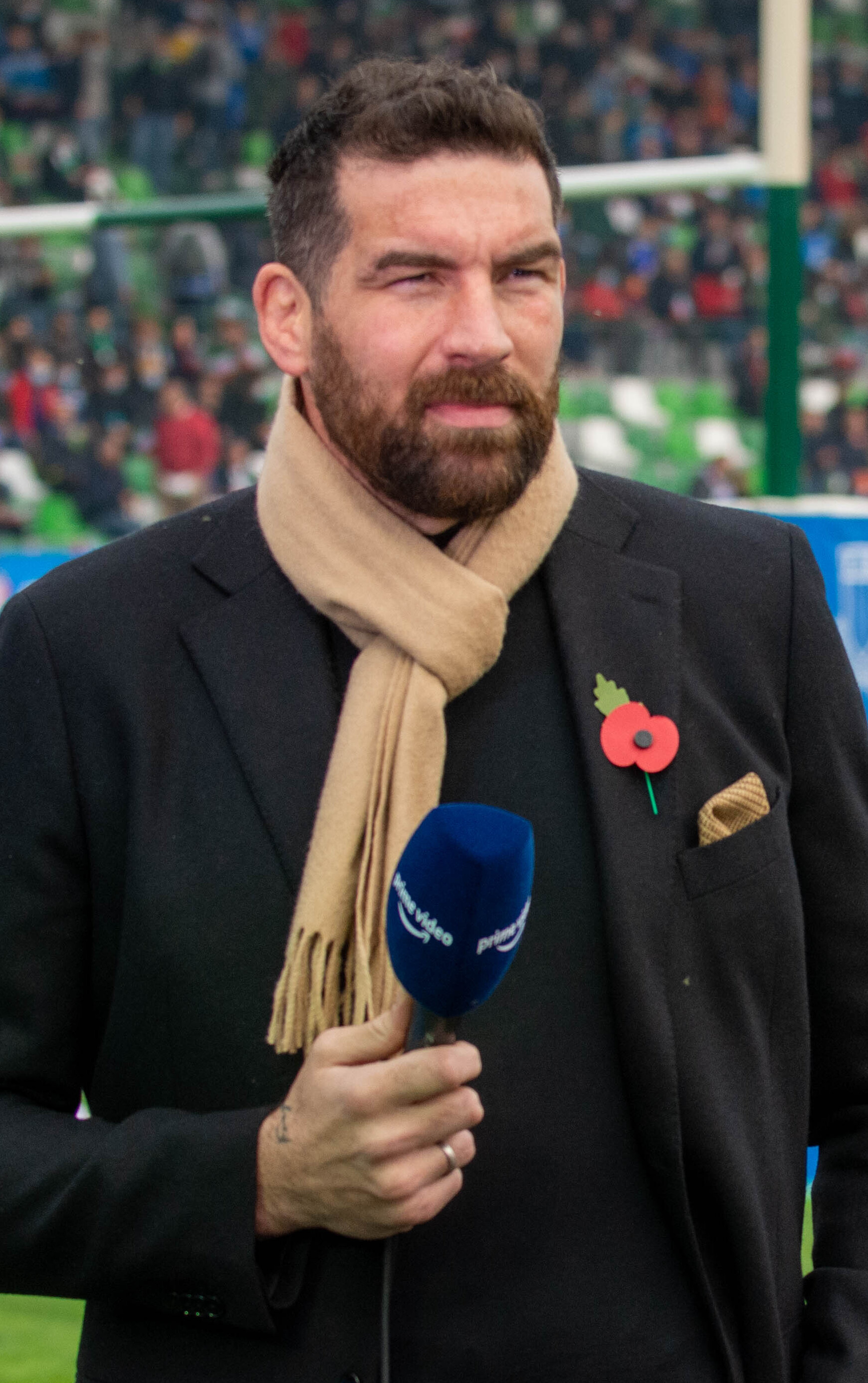
- Hamilton in 2021
- Born: James Leigh Hamilton; 17 November 1982 (age 43) Swindon, Wiltshire, England
- Height: 2.04 m (6 ft 8 in)
- Weight: 126 kg (278 lb; 19 st 12 lb)
- School: Coundon Court School

Rugby union career
- Position: Lock
Senior career
Years	Team	Apps	(Points)
2003–2008	Leicester Tigers	64	(20)
2008–2010	Edinburgh	22	(10)
2010–2013	Gloucester	61	(5)
2013–2014	Montpellier	16	(0)
2014–2017	Saracens	71	(5)
International career
Years	Team	Apps	(Points)
2006–2015	Scotland	63	(10)

James Leigh Hamilton (born 17 November 1982) is a Scottish former rugby union player who made 63 international appearances for the Scotland national team. He played for club sides Leicester Tigers 2003–2008, Edinburgh Rugby 2008–2010, Gloucester Rugby 2010–2013, Montpellier Herault Rugby 2013–2014 and Saracens F.C. 2014–2017.

== Early life ==
Hamilton was born and raised in Swindon, England, to a Scottish father and a half-English half-Chinese mother. He was brought up in Coventry and educated at Coundon Court School in Coventry, and played for Barkers Butts R.F.C. Whilst there he was part of the Warwickshire Colts side before joining Leicester Tigers. He also spent a summer playing in South Africa in order to advance his potential.

== Rugby career ==
Hamilton played for England at under-19 and under-21 level, but opted for senior honours with Scotland. He was the 1000th man to be capped by Scotland when he made an appearance off the bench against Romania on 11 November 2006. He gained his second cap off the bench against Australia when called up at the last minute for Nathan Hines, over confusion around whether or not Hines was suspended. Hamilton started in the first two games of the 2007 Six Nations Championship against England and Wales. He was included in the 2007 World Cup squad making several appearances during the group stages. Hamilton scored his first international try for Scotland on 19 June 2010, in Scotland's victory over Argentina.

In 2008 Hamilton signed a three-year contract with Edinburgh Rugby. Hamilton moved to Gloucester for the 2010–11 season.

He was appointed captain of Gloucester for the 2012–13 season under their coach Nigel Davies.

On 12 December 2012, it was announced Hamilton would leave Gloucester at the end of the season to join French club Montpellier on a three-year contract. On 28 May 2014, it was announced that Hamilton would leave Montpellier to return to England to join Saracens. During his time at Saracens he helped them win the Premiership title in 2015 and 2016, and also helped Saracens win the European Champions Cup in 2016 and 2017.

On 2 September 2015, Hamilton announced his retirement from international rugby after Vern Cotter had not selected him for Scotland's World Cup squad

In August 2016, Hamilton co-founded a sports marketing company with Ian Ascough called Those Fellas.

On 13 May 2017, Hamilton announced that he would not play rugby beyond the end of the 2016–2017 season.

Hamilton currently hosts a weekly podcast called 'The Rugby Pod' alongside Andy Goode, Dan Biggar, Producer Rob and weekly guests.
