= Bombing of Mannheim in World War II =

The German city of Mannheim in the state of Baden-Württemberg saw bombing during World War II from December 1940 until the end of the war. Mannheim saw over 150 air raids.

== 1939 ==
Mannheim was the subject of Allied air activity from the earliest days of the war. Although these early flights had reconnaissance as their aim rather than air raids. As The Times of 13 November 1939 notes, quoting a British official communique -

Royal Air Force aircraft successfully carried out reconnaissance flights over South-West Germany on Friday night. Among the cities over which our aircraft flew were Stuttgart, Mannheim, and Nuremberg. One aircraft has not returned.

— Air Ministry Communique

== 1940 ==
During the Battle of France, the Royal Air Force raided Mannheim as part of a night of raids attacking Nazi Germany's oil infrastructure.

The British government had developed plans for the large-scale area bombing of cities from the summer of 1940, but waited for an opportunity to present itself. That came after the German raid on Coventry. The new bombing policy, officially as a reprisal for Coventry and Southampton, was ordered by Winston Churchill on 1 December and explained in the War Cabinet on 12 December. Operation Abigail was approved on the 13th, on condition that it receive no publicity and be considered an experiment. The air-crews "rightly regarded the attack as a terror raid". Incendiaries dropped by eight bombers to mark the target missed the city centre, and most of the 100 or so aircraft (of 134 dispatched) that did drop bombs missed the city centre. German casualties were 34 dead and 81 injured. The lessons learned from the large dispersal of bombs over Mannheim led to the development of the "bomber stream", which entailed the maximum number of bombs over the shortest time and area. Despite the lack of decisive success, approval was granted for further similar raids.

In response to Luftwaffe raids on Britain, the RAF launched Operation Abigail Rachel against Mannheim. The raid took place on the night of 16/17 December 1940 and was intended to be the first where the RAF attackers would exceed 200 aircraft. In the event only 134 assorted craft were available for the operation. This was due to bad weather at British airfields. Although of poor effect, the raiders dropped one hundred tonnes of explosives and 14,000 incendiaries on Mannheim. The raid resulted in the loss of seven of the attacking aircraft. This made a loss rate to the RAF of 5.2%.

The Times reported attacks on Mannheim Railway Station, goods yards and industrial buildings. Bombers arrived just prior to 20.00 and carried through the attack in waves until the early hours of the following morning. The attack also encompassed the Neckarstadt areas of the city and the twin city of Ludwigshafen. A pilot reported the anti-aircraft fire rising "like a continuous golden fountain". However, other pilots said they were able to press home their attacks untroubled.

In contrast, a German High Command communique described the impact on production as 'insignificant'.

This was the start of a British drift away from precision attacks on military targets and towards area bombing attacks on whole cities.

Bomber Command aircraft attacked the city for the next two nights.

An Air Ministry communique reported -

Last [Wednesday] night the R.A.F. once again attacked Mannheim. Smoke from fires of previous raids was still hanging over the town. Four large new fires were started

— Air Ministry Communique

The RAF struck the city again in on Sunday 22 December with fires reported and 'a number of explosions'.

== 1941 ==
Attacks continued into 1941 with 'a small force of aircraft' attacking the city on 8 February in spite of poor weather. May saw heavy attacks, with the 5 May raid with fires seen through gaps in the cloud. Cloud cover reportedly made observation difficult 'but the glare through the clouds told of fires in all parts of the town'.

A pilot described the 5 May raid -

There was an astonishing explosion. It looked like an immense red ball, and it must have been a terrific fire. Stuff was being thrown up in the air as if from a huge spray. Then there was a great mushroom of smoke. When I turned away finally, the rear-gunner said he could still see a dull red glow remaining for some time.

— An RAF Pilot

The May raids continued on May 9 with a 'concentrated attack' that was described as a 'highly successful operation'. An RAF pilot reported counting 27 major fires. The Air Ministry communique regarding the raid called it 'concentrated and destructive'.

July saw further raids 'with an improvement in weather' affording the attackers improved navigation. Industrial and rail targets were reported to have received 'a good deal of damage'. A raid of 23 July reported no losses with all RAF aircraft returning safely.

The coming of August brought 'conspicuous success' to the attackers. Despite poor weather on the journey the skies cleared over the target area. An Air Ministry communique stated that, 'a great weight of the heaviest bombs was dropped, inflicting severe and widespread damage'. A gale-force wind fanned the flames and increased the damage caused.

Another August raid was described by The Times's aeronautical correspondent -

A powerful bomber force was concentrated on Mannheim on Wednesday in the 47th raid on this industrial and communications centre. The weather was clear, enabling all our machines to locate their primary targets, with the result that the attack developed into one of the heaviest made for some time on a single town. Mannheim had suffered a heavy raid on Monday night, and before the havoc caused then could be cleared up large numbers of heavy bombs were adding to it. There were many vivid explosions and roaring fires. A high wind fanned the flames and caused some of the outbreaks to assume great dimensions.

— Aeronautical Correspondent – The Times

== 1942 ==
The first raid since 7 November 1941 was directed against Mannheim on 11 February 1942. The February raid was 'the heaviest directed against a German target since January 10, when a heavy weight of bombs was dropped on Wilhelmshaven'.

RAF Bomber Command returned to the city on 19 May. A mixture of aircraft; Stirling, Lancaster, Halifax, Manchester, Wellington and Hampden bombers, were sent against targets in Mannheim. The raid, which came at the same time as an attack on St. Nazaire, was described as 'nuisance raids' by the Germans.

The aircraft in this raid were recorded by a sound engineer for the BBC. Intending to capture a nightingale's song he also, by accident, captured the sound of the RAF bombers on their way to attack Mannheim. In that raid 197 planes were dispatched and 12 were lost. The recording was used by Manfred Mann's Earth Band in their 1975 album Nightingales & Bombers.

== After 1942 ==
On 9 August 1943, nine RAF aircraft were lost in an attack against the city. A key target for the raid was the BASF plant which ran for three miles along the banks of the Rhine. Heavy cloud lead to defenders shining searchlights into the clouds in an effort to silhouette the bombers. Bomber crews reported seeing fires almost 100 miles away.

The largest raid on Mannheim was on 5 and 6 September 1943. A large part of the city was destroyed. Further raids destroyed Mannheim Palace in 1944 leaving only one room undamaged out of over 500. On 2 March 1945 the RAF launched a 300-bomber attack, causing a devastating firestorm. 25,181 tons of bombs fell throughout the war.

== Sources ==
- Boog, Horst; Rahn, Werner; Stumpf, Reinhard; Wegner, Bernd (13 September 2001). Germany and the Second World War. Vol. VI: The Global War. Militärgeschichtliches Forschungsamt (Research Institute for Military History), Potsdam, Germany. Oxford University Press. ISBN 978-0-19-822888-2. LCCN 00-031362. EBSCOhost 363638.
