= Jack Cosgrove (rugby union) =

English rugby union player

- Born: Jack Cosgrove; 30 July 1994 (age 32) Coventry, England
- Height: 1.84 m (6 ft 0 in)
- Weight: 119 kg (18 st 10 lb)
- School: Coundon Court School
- University: Hartpury College

Rugby union career
- Position: Prop
Senior career
Years	Team	Apps	(Points)
2013–2014	Worcester Warriors	2	(0)
2014–2015	Doncaster Knights	19	(0)
2015–2017	Edinburgh	16	(0)
2015–2016	→ London Scottish	21	(0)
2017−2018	Bristol	14	(0)
2018−2019	Worcester Warriors	2	(0)
2019	Dragons	6	(0)
International career
Years	Team	Apps	(Points)
2013–2014	Scotland U20	12	(0)

Jack Cosgrove (born 30 July 1994) is a retired Scottish rugby union player playing most recently for Dragons in the Pro14.

Born in Coventry, Cosgrove attended Coundon Court School – alma mater of Scotland international Jim Hamilton – then Hartpury College, before joining Worcester Warriors Academy in 2013. In 2015, he signed a two-year deal with Edinburgh until May 2017.

In March 2017, Cosgrove returned south with Bristol Rugby ahead of the 2017-18 Greene King IPA Championship season.

In December 2018, Cosgrove left Bristol by mutual consent to return to Worcester Warriors.

In June 2019, Cosgrove signed a two-year contract for Welsh region Dragons in the Pro14 from the 2019-20 season.

It was announced in December 2019, that Cosgrove had been forced to retire from professional rugby, aged 25, because of a serious eye injury sustained in training.
