= Alice Arnold (mayor) =

English trade unionist and politician, first female mayor of Coventry

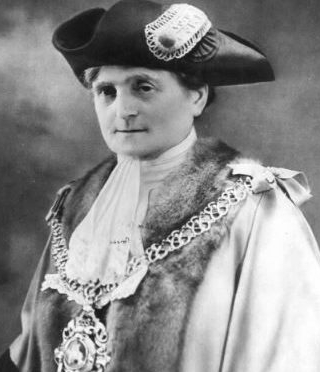
- In Coventry's mayoral regalia which she initially refused to wear, not wanting to seem different from her constituents
- Born: 19 January 1881; Coventry
- Died: 1955
- Occupations: Politician, trade unionist

Alice Arnold (19 January 1881 – 22 November 1955) was a socialist and trade unionist in Coventry. She was one of the first women on the city council, serving for 36 years, and became the first female mayor of the city in 1937.

== Biography ==
Arnold was born on 19 January 1881 in the Coventry Workhouse to Caroline and Samuel Arnold. Her mother and three siblings had been admitted to the workhouse on 23 November 1880 and were discharged on 19 February 1882. Arnold was employed in cycle factories from the age of eleven. Her experiences made her want to improve life for people in her community, she became an organiser of the Worker's Union and Secretary of the Coventry Social Democratic Federation (SDF) Women’s Circle.

In 1919, Arnold was elected as an independent Labour councillor in Coventry. She campaigned for better living conditions for those living in the city. She was elected Mayor in 1937. At the mayoral ceremony, she assured men that women had no desire for sex antagonism but that they did feel that it was time for them to stand side by side with men in the work of the world.

Arnold was popular with the electorate of the city. In October 1938 she led a protest for 'peace and plenty.' The protest culminated in a delegation of over 100 people travelling on a specially chartered train to London and delivering a petition signed by 60,000 Coventry citizens (two-thirds of the city's electorate) to the Home Office. The aim of the petition was to promote peace and abolish poverty.

She died in 1955.

== Legacy ==
In 2024, it was announced that a blue commemorative plaque will be installed at Arnold's former home 20 Short Street, Coventry, in 2025.
