= John Harford (MP) =

16th-century English politician

John Harford (by 1501 – 1559/60), of Coventry, Warwickshire, was an English Member of Parliament for Coventry in November 1554. He was Mayor of Coventry 1546–7.
