= One Night in November =

British play

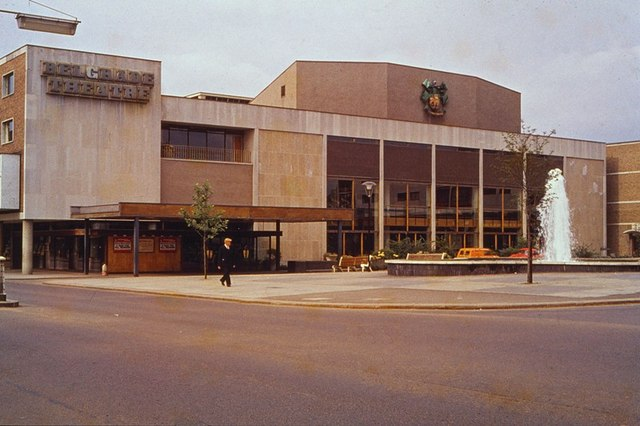
- The Belgrade Theatre, where the play was first performed
- Original title: One Night in November
- Written by: Alan Pollock
- Based on: Coventry Blitz
- Characters: Michael; Katie Stanley; Katie's mother; Leandra Ashton
- Original language: English
- Subject: The Coventry Blitz in the Second World War
- Genre: Historical
- Setting: Coventry, England

Premiere
- Date premiered: 2008
- Place premiered: Belgrade Theatre, Coventry, England

One Night in November is a 2008 play by Alan Pollock, about the Coventry Blitz in November 1940 during the Second World War.

The play was first performed in 2008 at the Belgrade Theatre in Coventry, England. It originally starred Daniel Brocklebank (as Michael) and Joanna Christie (as Katie), and was reviewed by Michael Billington in The Guardian, Paul Taylor in The Independent, and Charles Spencer from The Telegraph. Other actors included Helen Sheals as Katie's Catholic mother and Leandra Ashton as a code-breaking colleague of Michael. The play has a cast of five male and four female characters. The script is available in 104-page book form.

The play was later performed by the Guildburys Theatre Company in 2017. The play was streamed online by the Belgrade Theatre in 2020 to coincide with the 80th anniversary of the Coventry Blitz. Alan Pollock reflected on the play in a 2020 interview.

== Plot ==
The play follows the story of the Stanley family's experience of the Coventry Blitz. It considers the possibility that Winston Churchill received a warning about the attack and poses the question of if Coventry was sacrificed in order to not reveal that Britain had cracked the enigma code.

Katie Stanley is 18 years old and is training to become a teacher. While waiting for an air raid "all clear" signal, she meets Michael, a language tutor from Oxford. It could be the start of a traditional love affair. However, Michael is using his expertise in linguistics at Bletchley Park to help with the decipherment of German secret codes. Katie and her family live in Coventry. They do not realise the threat to Coventry from the air by Germany, but due to his wartime job, Michael does have this information. This moral dilemma is explored by the play.
