= The Old Hall Hotel, Coventry =

House in Coventry, West Midlands, England

Coordinates: 52°26′27″N 1°32′18″W

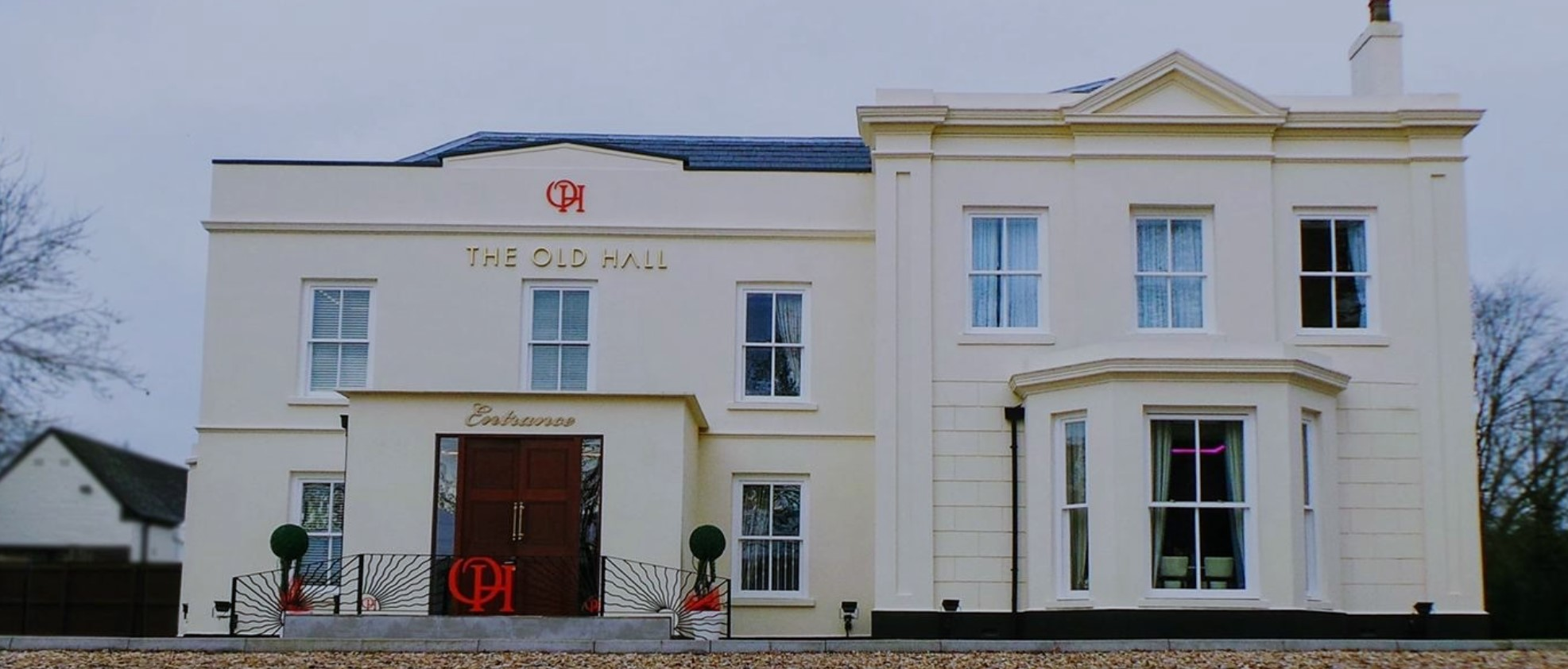
The Old Hall Hotel

The Old Hall Hotel in Coundon near Coventry, England, is a building of historical significance and is Grade II listed on the English Heritage Register. It was built in about 1800 by a wealthy landowner and was called Coundon Villa and later Coundon Hall. It was the residence of several notable people until about 1947, when it was converted to a hotel. Today it is still a hotel which provides accommodation, restaurant and bar facilities.

== Early residents ==
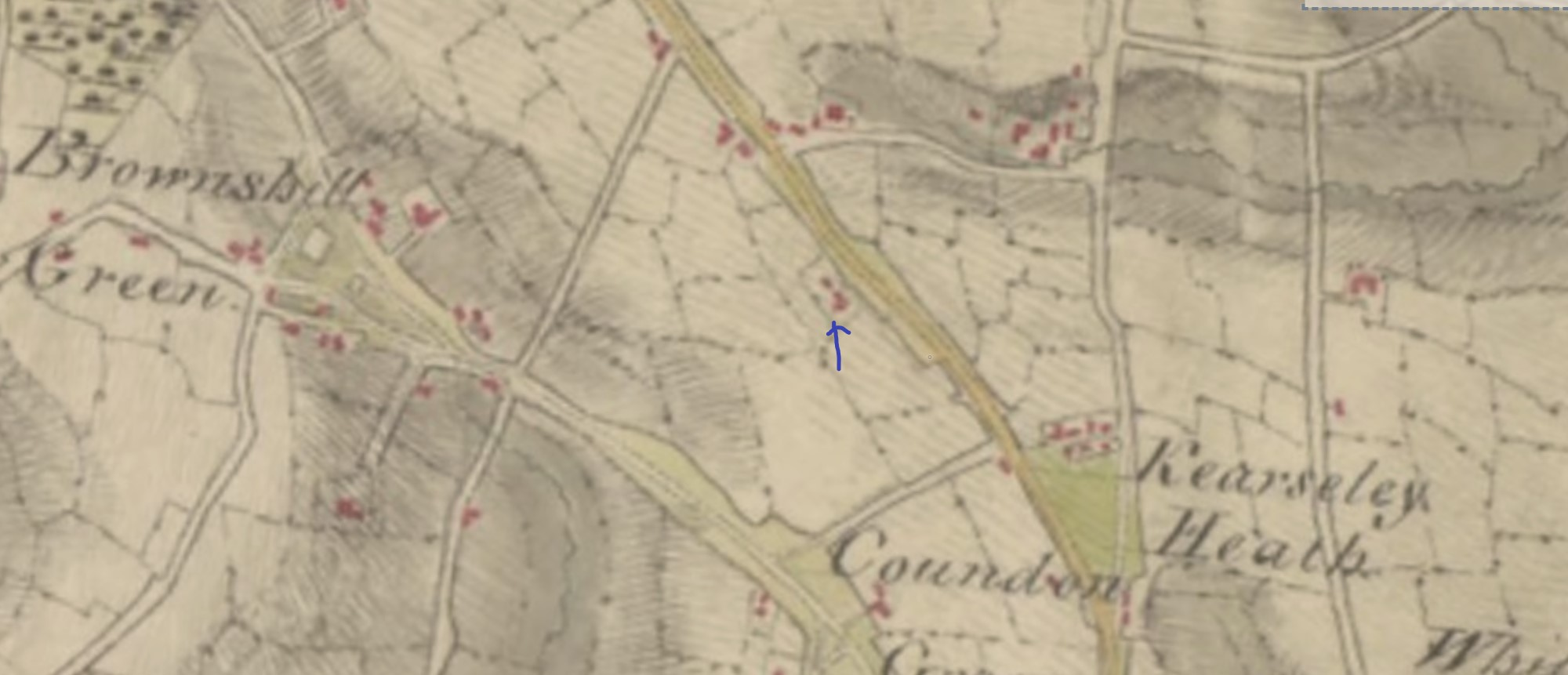
Map of Coundon 1814 showing Coundon Villa (blue arrow)

Samuel Oldham (1754–1815) built the Old Hall Hotel in about 1800. These may have been additions to an earlier farmhouse. He was a wealthy landowner who had inherited a large fortune from his uncle who died in 1771. His father was Thomas Oldham (1715–1767) who was Mayor of Coventry, and his mother was Katherine Lawton, only child of Nathaniel Lawton of Coventry. Samuel lived in Coventry for many years, but then moved to Coundon, where he built a villa house. It is shown on the map of 1814.

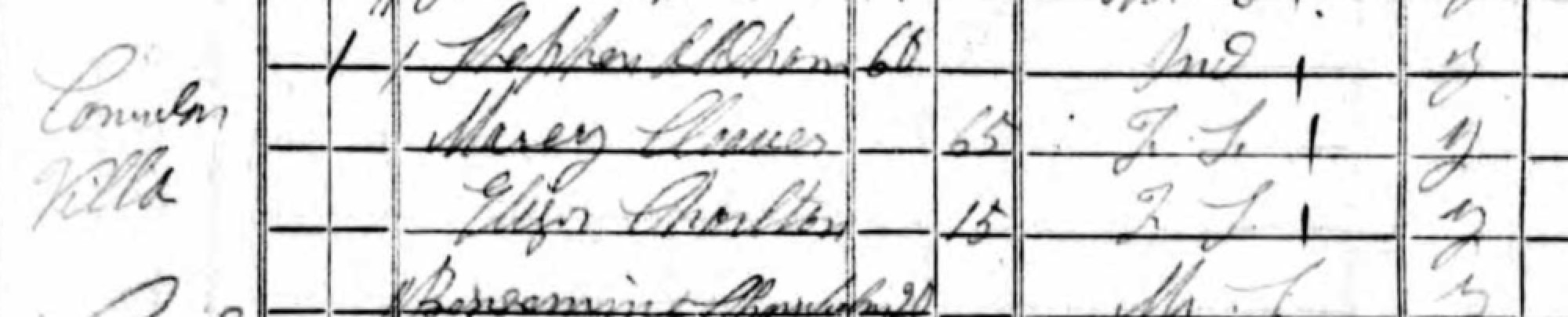
Census of 1841 showing Stephen Oldham living at Coundon Villa

He did not marry, so when he died at Coundon in 1815 he left his estate to his nephews Thomas and Stephen Oldham. His will describes the large amount of property that he owned. Stephen Oldham (1778–1841) inherited his house in Coundon and other properties.

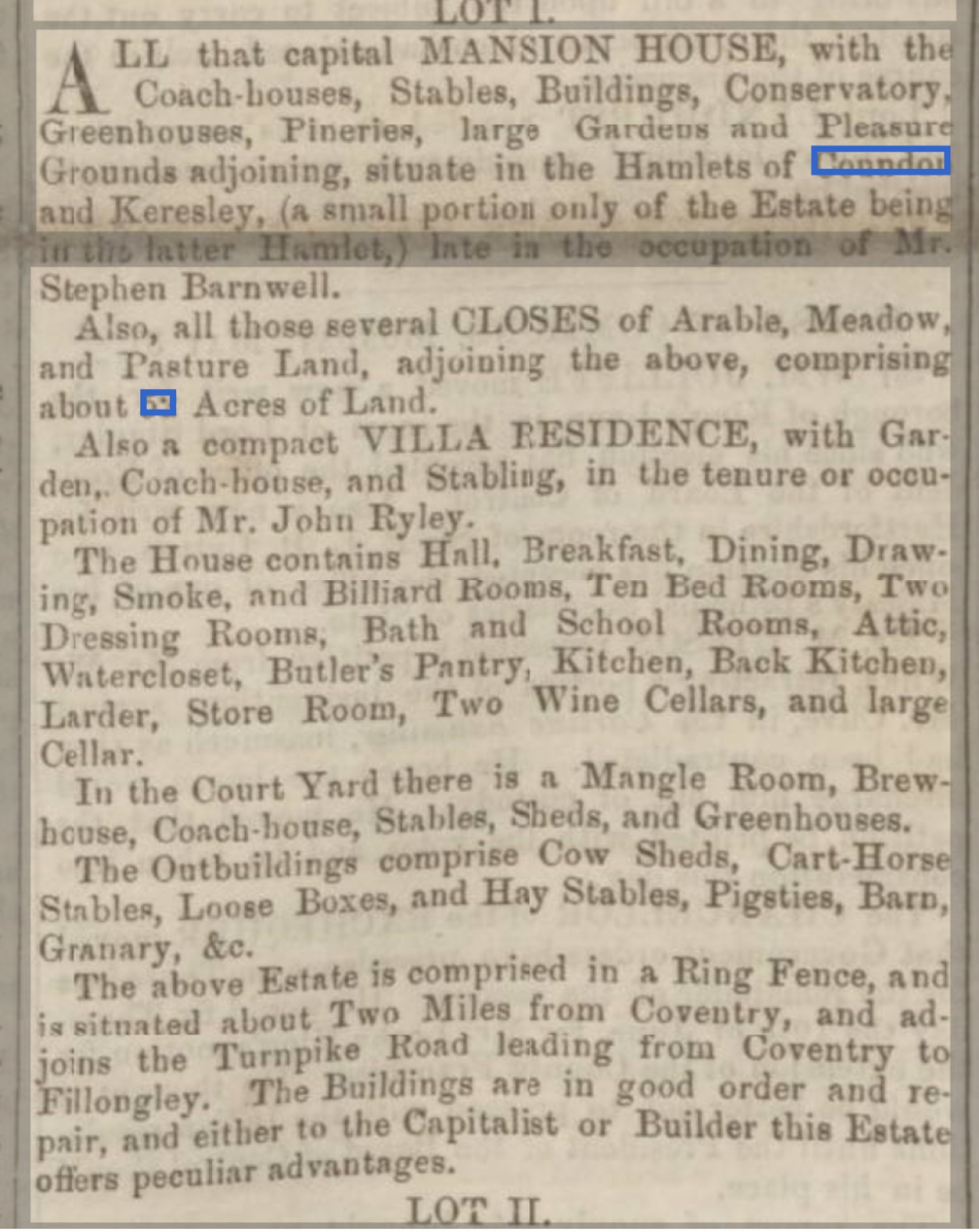
Sale notice for Coundon Hall in 1858

Stephen was born in 1778 in Coventry. His father was William Oldham (1745–1818) and his mother was Mary Dickerson. After he inherited Coundon Villa from his uncle he moved there to live. He is shown in the 1841 Census as living at "Coundon Villa" with three servants. He also had no children, and when he died in 1841 he left his residence to Stephen Barnwell, who was the husband of his niece Maria Augusta Oldham.

Stephen Barnwell (1810–1862) was born in 1810 in Kenilworth. He was a ribbon and lace manufacturer in Coventry. In 1836 he married Maria Augusta Oldham, daughter of Thomas Oldham of Allesley. Thomas published in 1840 a book of poetry which can be read at this reference. The couple had eight children. The 1851 Census reports them as living at "Coundon Villa" with three of their children, two servants and a governess. They may have made substantial additions to the house while they were living there. In 1858 they advertised it for sale and the advertisement is shown. The house is described as a mansion with a hall, breakfast and dining, drawing, smoking and billiard rooms. Ten bedrooms, two dressing rooms, bath and school rooms, attic, water closet, butler's pantry, kitchen, back kitchen, larder, store room, two wine cellar and large cellar.

The next residents appear to be tenants. Samuel Smith and his wife Mary are recorded in the 1861 Census and Ellen Bradshaw Isherwood in the 1871 Census. Ellen was the wife of Thomas Bradshaw Isherwood, a wealthy landowner.

== Later residents ==
The next owners of the house were the Winn family. John Russell Winn (1845–1906) was a grazier (pastoral farmer) and horse breeder. He bought the house soon after his marriage to Lucy Watson in 1872. They advertised the house for sale in 1883. It was bought by Alexander Rotherham. Alexander Rotherham (1840–1929) was director of Premier Cycle Company, which manufactured bicycles and automobiles. His father was John Rotherham (1816–1875), who was from the famous watchmaking firm Rotherhams in Coventry. In 1862 Alexander married Jane Sheepshanks, the daughter of Thomas Sheepshanks, Rector of Coventry and Headmaster of Coventry School. The couple had nine children. One of their sons was Arthur Rotherham, a famous rugby player. The family lived at the house until 1899 when it was sold to Edgar Turrall.

Edgar Turrall (1859–1945) was the owner of the Hall for the next fifty years. He was born in 1859 in Coventry and became a wealthy textile manufacturer. In 1899, at the time he bought the house, he married Kathleen Elizabeth Hollick (1872–1953). The couple had three daughters. Edgar died in 1945 and two years later Kathleen sold the Hall to the Northampton Brewery Company, who converted it to a hotel.
