= Die Luftwacht =

Die Luftwacht: "Luftwissen" section, volume 10, 1943, with the stamp of Hermann Göring's Bücherei (library) in Braunschweig (Brunswick)

Die Luftwacht (English: "The Air Watch" or "The Air Guard") was an air magazine covering German aircraft industry technology published in Germany from the early 20th century to around 1944. The magazine was based in Berlin. Old copies of the magazine can be found in aeronautical establishments and libraries, and are often offered for sale at auction.

== Editions ==
During the Nazi era the magazine was renamed Deutsche Luftwacht and published in three editions with the assistance of the German Ministry of Aviation. These were "Luftwehr" (military topics), "Luftwelt" (aeronautics in the wider world) and "Luftwissen" (air knowledge or aeronautical research items).

The main editor was Otto Hollbach, with copy supplied by the German Academy of Aviation Research and the Lilienthal Society for aeronautics research. Reichsmarschall Hermann Göring and other senior Nazi military leaders were often featured. During this period the title page also featured the Nazi swastika emblem. During the Second World War, items included military activity, for example the bombing of Coventry.
