= William Dring =

English painter (1904–90)

William Dring RA
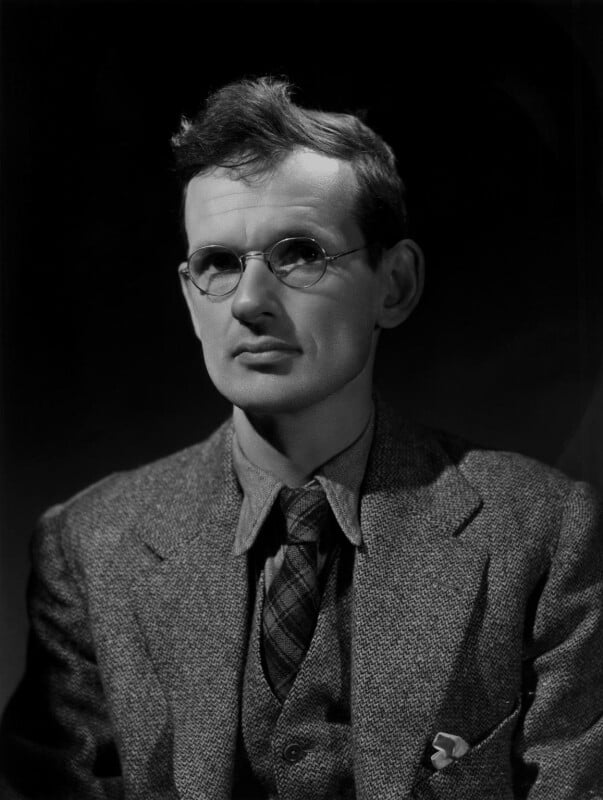
- Dring in 1944
- Born: 26 January 1904; Streatham, London, England
- Died: 29 September 1990 (aged 86); Compton, Hampshire, England
- Education: Slade School of Fine Art
- Known for: Painting, drawing

Dennis William Dring RA (26 January 1904 – 29 September 1990) was a British portraitist.

== Early life ==
Dring was born in Streatham, London and studied at the Slade School of Fine Art between 1922 and 1925, where he won several prizes and scholarships. He taught drawing and painting at the Southampton School of Art until 1942. In the late 1920s Dring was commissioned by the architects Edwin Lutyens and Albert Edward Richardson to paint a number of murals.

== World War Two ==
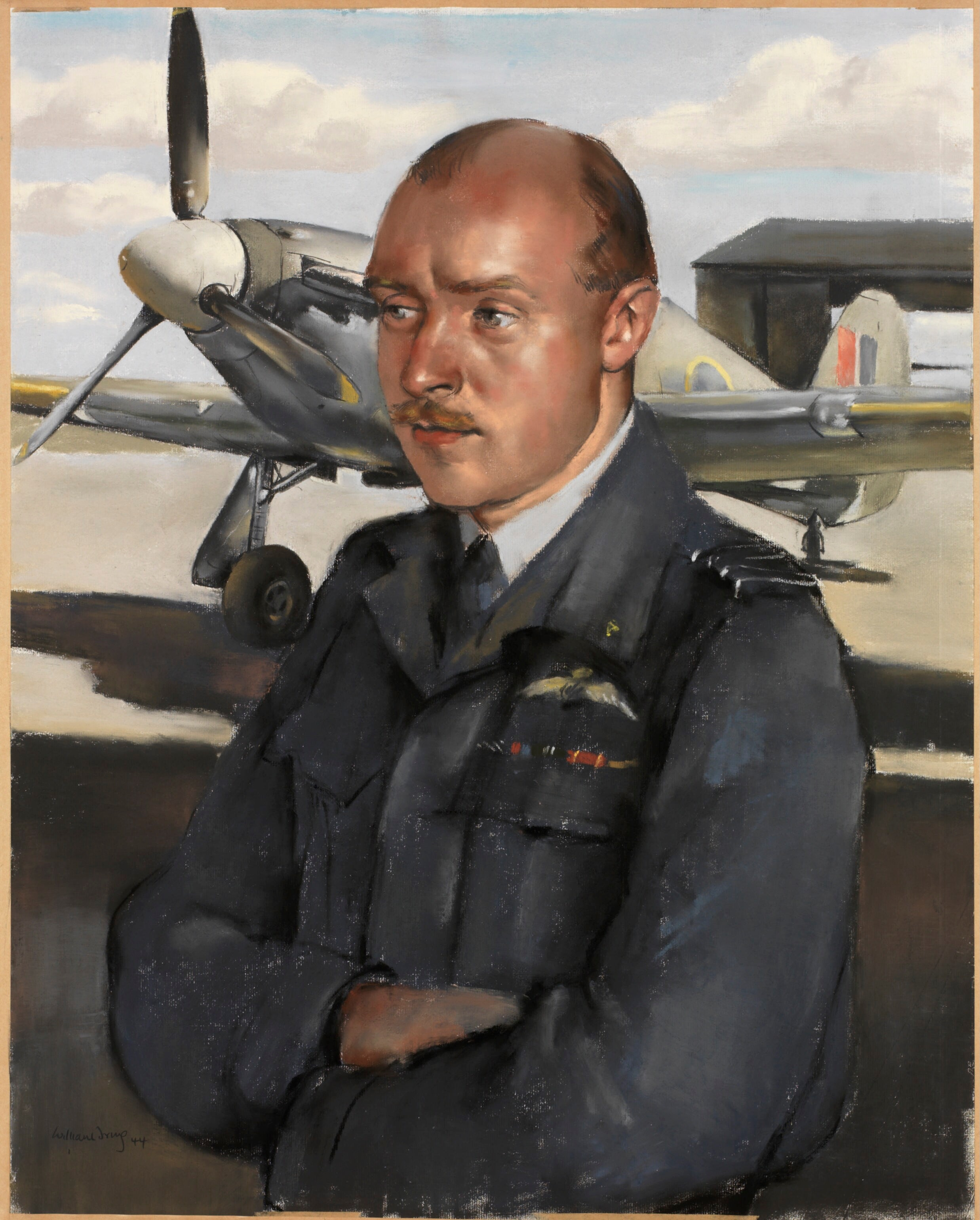
Group Captain AG Miller DFC, Order of Lenin (Art.IWM ART LD 4836)

At the start of the Second World War Dring completed several portrait commissions for the War Artists' Advisory Committee, WAAC. In early 1942 he resigned from Southampton School of Art to work on a full-time contract for the Committee, specialising in Admiralty portraits. He travelled extensively within Britain at this time, painting subjects in Portsmouth, Scotland and the Western Approaches. In the late summer of 1943 he was given a second full-time contract which included more general subjects. His final war-time contract with WAAC saw Dring working on portraits for the Air Ministry throughout 1944 and 1945. Sixty-four of Drings war-time portraits, mostly pastels are in the collection of the Imperial War Museum, who also hold five oil paintings by him. There are a further forty of his wartime works at the National Maritime Museum, mostly pastel portraits.

== Later life ==
Dring's post-war career included notable portraits of Sir Frank Stenton, Austin Hopkinson and of Cecil Hurst, family groups and landscapes plus portraits of members of the Royal Family. He recorded the presentation of the freedom of the City of London to the future Queen Elizabeth in 1947 and produced a series of five portraits for Lincoln's Inn that included pictures of both Lord Hailsham and Margaret Thatcher. Dring was a frequent exhibitor at the Royal Watercolour Society and at the Royal Academy. He became an associate member of the RA in 1944 and a full academician in 1955. His younger brother James was also an artist. Dring married the artist Grace Rothwell and the couple lived at Compton, near Winchester. Their daughter, Melissa Dring is a portrait painter and forensic artist.
