= Ernest Hugh Snell =

Dr Ernest Hugh Snell FRSE (1862–1940) was a 19th/20th century British barrister-at-law and Medical Officer of Health for Coventry.

== Life ==
He took a general Science degree in London allowing him to enter the course on Medicine qualifying MB in 1889. He gained his doctorate (MD) in 1891. He received a Diploma in Public Health (DPH) from Cambridge University in 1893.

His career began as Assistant Medical Superintendent at Paddington Infirmary. He then became Ophthalmic and Obstetric Surgeon at Queen's Hospital in Birmingham. In 1897 he became Medical Officer of Health for Coventry remaining in this role for the rest of his working life. In 1897 he also qualified as a barrister.

In 1899 he was elected a Fellow of the Royal Society of Edinburgh. His proposers were George Wilson, William Robert Smith, Charles Hunter Stewart and Alexander Crum Brown.

In 1909 he became a Captain (Physician) in the Territorial Army.

He was President of the Institute of Public Health 1926/27.

He retired in 1930.

He died during a German air raid on Coventry on 22 October 1940 when his house at 3 Eaton Road was destroyed by an enemy bomb. He is buried in Coventry's County Borough Cemetery. A memorial plaque was erected to his memory in King's College Chapel in London.

== Family ==
His first wife died (date unknown) after the birth of their twin daughters, known affectionately as 'Dot' and 'Kiss' in the greater family (actual names unknown). He later married Mary Katharine Reid (date unknown), 'Kate', who came from Edinburgh and she became a loyal mother to his two daughters. She predeceased him at their home on the 29th January, 1939.

== Publications ==
- The Tenure of Office of the Medical Officer of Health (1904)
- Some Aspects of the Housing Problem and Town Planning (1908)
- The Utility of the Hospital Isolation of Diphtheria (1915)
- Industrial Hygiene (1920)
