= Alan Pollock =

British author, playwright, and scriptwriter

- Born: 1962 (age 63–64)
- Education: St John's College, Oxford
- Occupations: Playwright and scriptwriter
- Employer(s): Coventry University; University of Gloucestershire; University of Warwick
- Writing career
- Language: English
- Period: 1984 to present
- Notable works: The Bill (2007); One Night in November (2008)
- Notable awards: Writers' Guild of Great Britain Award (2008)

Alan Pollock is a British author, playwright, and scriptwriter.

Pollock was awarded a Bachelor of Arts degree in French Language and Literature from St John's College, University of Oxford in 1984.

== Writing career ==
His plays include:

- All Tomorrow's Parties
- The Allesley Silas, based on the novel Silas Marner by George Eliot
- The Bear who went to War, the story of Wojtek, a bear who fought in the Second World War
- Godiva Rocks, a musical
- One Night in November, about the Coventry Blitz, originally starring Daniel Brocklebank and Joanna Christie
- Pigs
- Too Much Pressure
- Treasure Island, based on the novel Treasure Island by Robert Louis Stevenson

Pollock's television writing credits include:

- Always and Everyone (2002) – 1 episode
- Attachments (2020) – 1 episode
- The Bill (1984–2010) – 6 episodes
- Black Cab – 1 episode
- The Death of Daniel – thriller
- Peter Pan (2020) – television special

Radio plays by Pollock include Philip and Sydney (2010), about the poet Philip Larkin, with an associated book, and Every Duchess in England (2013), both broadcast on BBC Radio 4. Pollock's publications include the children's picture book The Bear who went to War, associated with his play of the same name, He contributed to the television drama series The Bill, leading to a Writers' Guild of Great Britain Award in 2008 for series 23 (2007).

Pollock has taught creative writing at the University of Gloucestershire and the University of Warwick. He established a Master of Arts course on Creative Writing at Coventry University. He also gives master classes on playwriting.
