= George Singer (cycle manufacturer) =

English cycle manufacturer

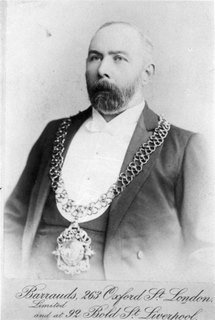
- circa 1894
- Born: 1846; Stinsford, Dorset, England
- Died: 4 January 1909 aged 62; Coventry, Warwickshire, England
- Occupation: Cycle manufacturer

George Singer (1846 – 4 January 1909) was an English cycle manufacturer who was a pioneer of both cycle and automobile development.

Singer was born at Stinsford, Dorset in 1847, the son of George and Helen Singer. He served an apprenticeship at Penn's Engineering Works in Greenwich and in 1869 he moved to Coventry to work at the Coventry Machinist Company. Around 1874 he started his own company to manufacture cycles, Singer & Co, in 1894 that became Singer & Co Ltd, and in 1896 the Singer Cycle Company, that soon grew into a large business and also in 1896, at the height of popularity for cycles, he floated his business as a company with a capital of £700,000 reverting to Singer & Co Ltd. The development of forks with curves is attributed to him.

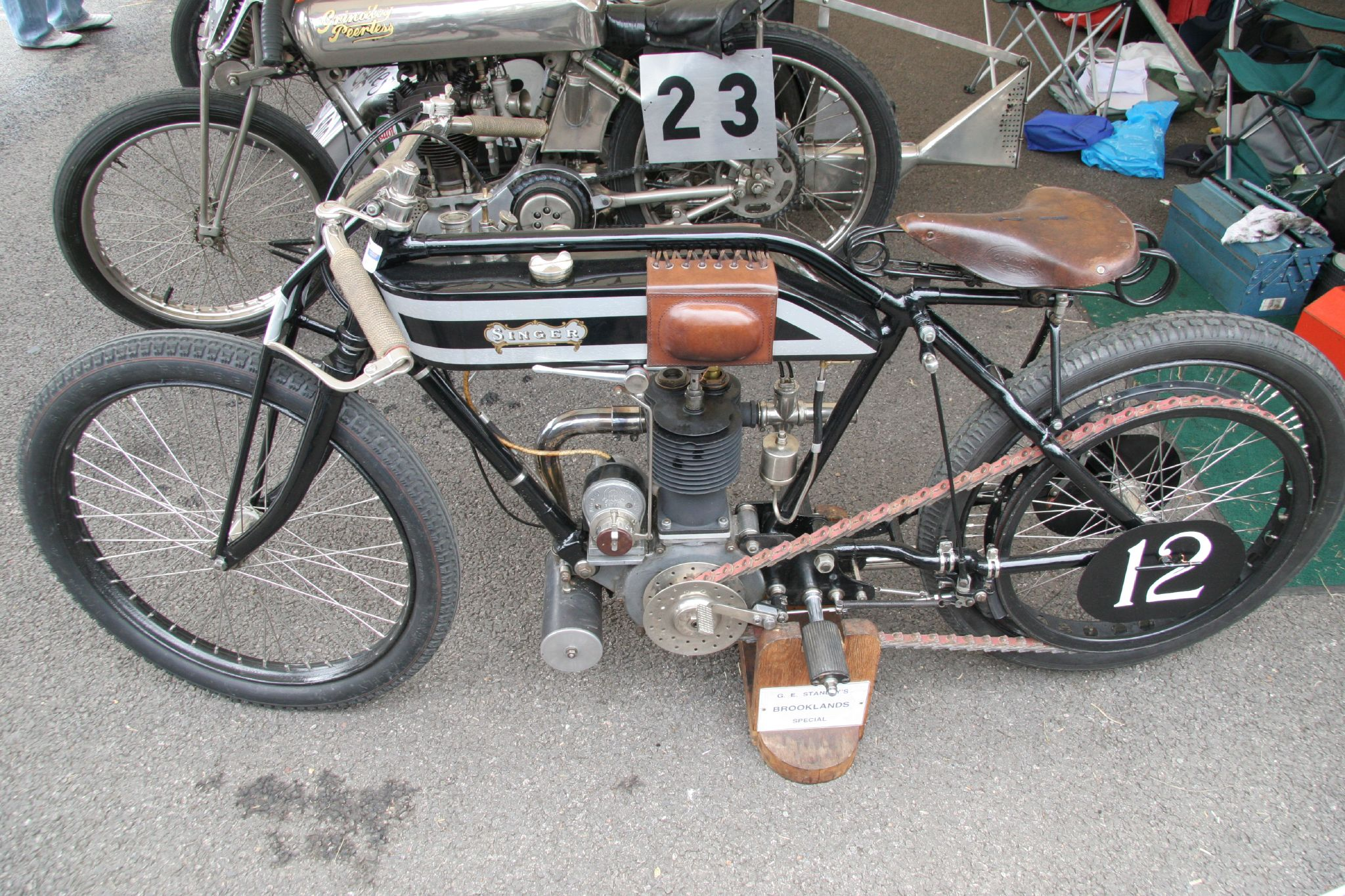
A Singer motorcycle

Singer was elected to the Coventry city council in 1881; he became an alderman in 1893 and also served as Mayor of Coventry from 1891 to 1894. He resigned from the council in 1898 as his interests were more with philanthropy and charity than politics.

Singer died on 4 January 1909, aged 62 at his home at Coundon Court in Coventry. which is now used as the site of Coundon Court school.
