= Coventry Blitz =

German bombing raids on the English city in World War II

- Part of the Strategic bombing of World War II and The Blitz
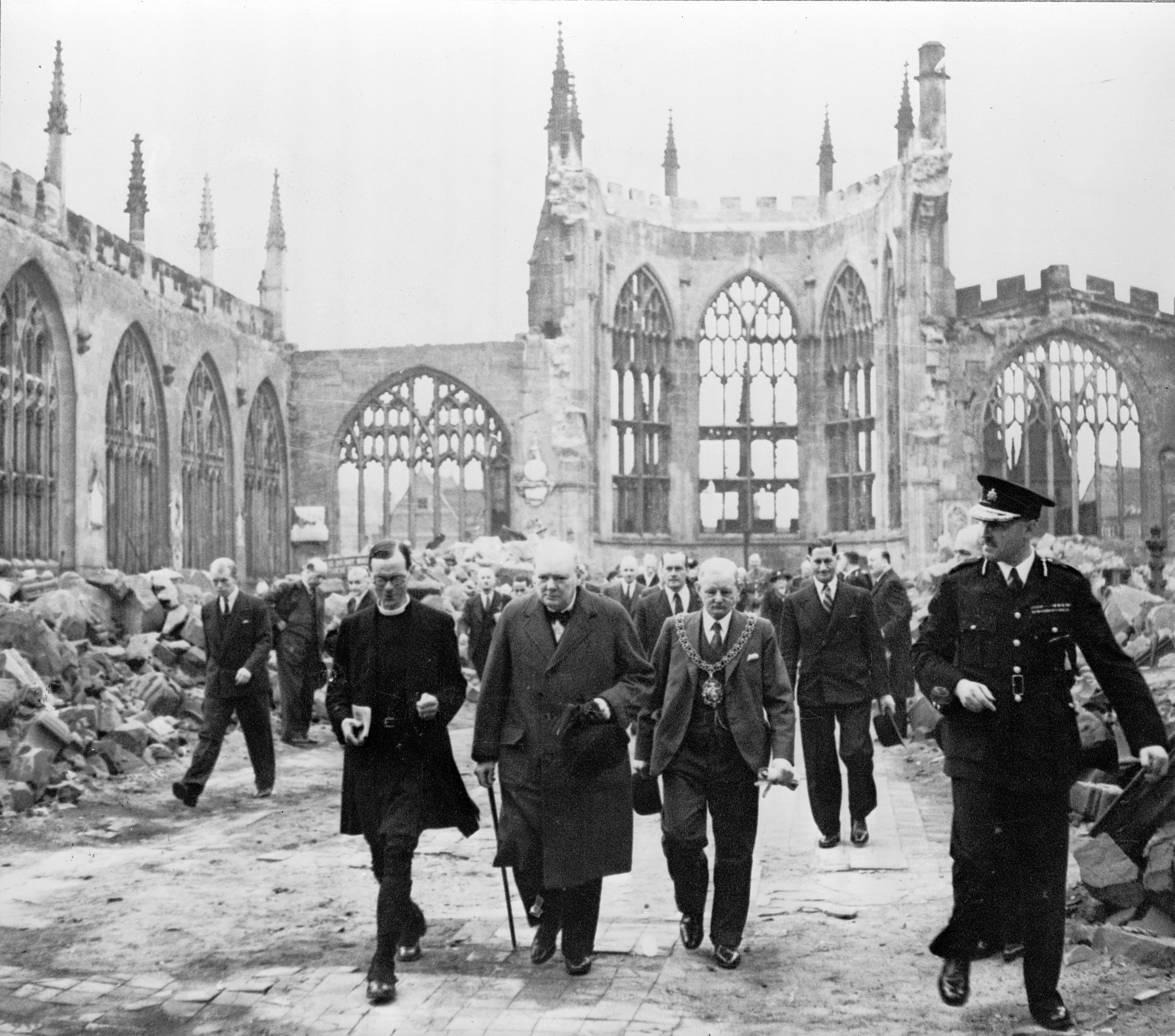
- Winston Churchill, the Mayor J. A. Moseley, the Bishop of Coventry M. G. Haigh, the Deputy Mayor A. R. Grindlay, and others visiting the ruins of Coventry Cathedral in September 1941
Date	1940–1942
Location	Coventry, Warwickshire
Result	Coventry city centre severely damaged by German air raids

Belligerents
Nazi Germany	United Kingdom

The Coventry Blitz (blitz: from the German word Blitzkrieg meaning "lightning war") was the German Axis bombing that took place on the British city of Coventry. The city was bombed many times during the Second World War by the German Air Force (Luftwaffe). The most devastating of these attacks occurred on the evening of 14 November 1940 and continued into the morning of 15 November.

== Background ==
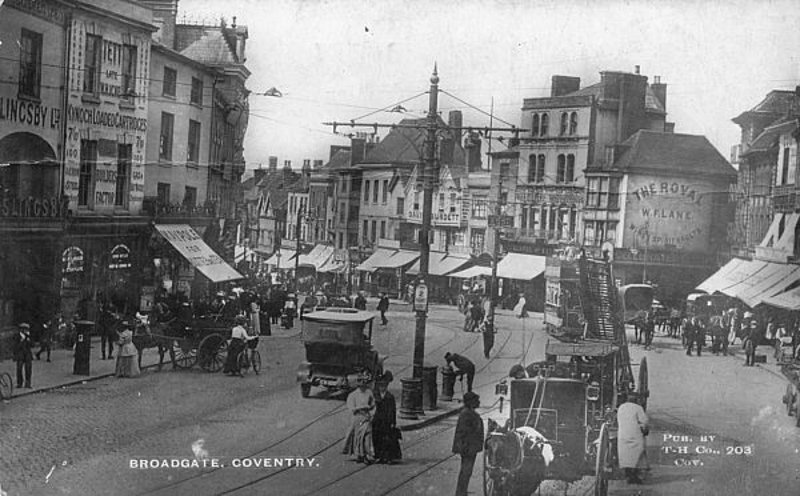
Broadgate, Coventry in 1917

At the start of the Second World War, Coventry was an industrial city of around 238,000 people which, like much of the industrial West Midlands, contained metal- and woodworking industries. In Coventry's case, these included cars, bicycles, aeroplane engines and, since 1900, munitions factories. In the words of the historian Frederick Taylor, "Coventry was therefore, in terms of what little law existed on the subject, a legitimate target for aerial bombing."

During the First World War, the advanced state of the mechanical tooling industry in the city meant that pre-war production could quickly be turned to war production purposes, with industries such as the Coventry Ordnance Works assuming the role of one of the leading munition centres in the UK, manufacturing 25% of all British aircraft produced during the war.

Like many of the industrial towns of the English West Midlands region that had been industrialised during the Industrial Revolution, many of the small- and medium-sized factories in the city were woven into the same streets as the workers' houses and the shops of the city centre. However, it developed many large interwar suburbs of both private and council housing, which were relatively isolated from industrial buildings. The city was also at the centre of Britain's car industry, with many carmakers being based at different locations in Coventry, although many of these factories had switched to help supply the war effort.

== Air raids ==
=== August to October 1940 ===
There were 17 small raids on Coventry by the Luftwaffe during the Battle of Britain between August and October 1940 during which around 198 tons of bombs fell. Together, the raids killed 176 people and injured around 680. The most notable damage was to the new Rex Cinema which had been opened in February 1937 and had already been closed by an earlier bombing raid in September. On 17 October 1940, Second Lieutenant Sandy Campbell of the Royal Engineers Bomb Disposal Company was called upon to deal with an unexploded bomb that had fallen at the Triumph Engineering works in Canley. Because of it, war production in two factories had been stopped and many nearby residents had been evacuated. Campbell found that the bomb was fitted with a delayed-action fuse that was impossible to remove, so he transported it to a safe place. That was done by lorry, and he lay alongside the bomb so that he could hear if it started ticking and could warn the driver to stop and run for cover. Having taken it a safe distance, he disposed of the bomb but was killed whilst dealing with another bomb the next day. Campbell was posthumously awarded a George Cross for his actions of 17 October 1940 at Triumph. A notable casualty of the October raids was Ernest Snell FRSE, a retired local Medical Officer of Health.

=== 14 November 1940 ===
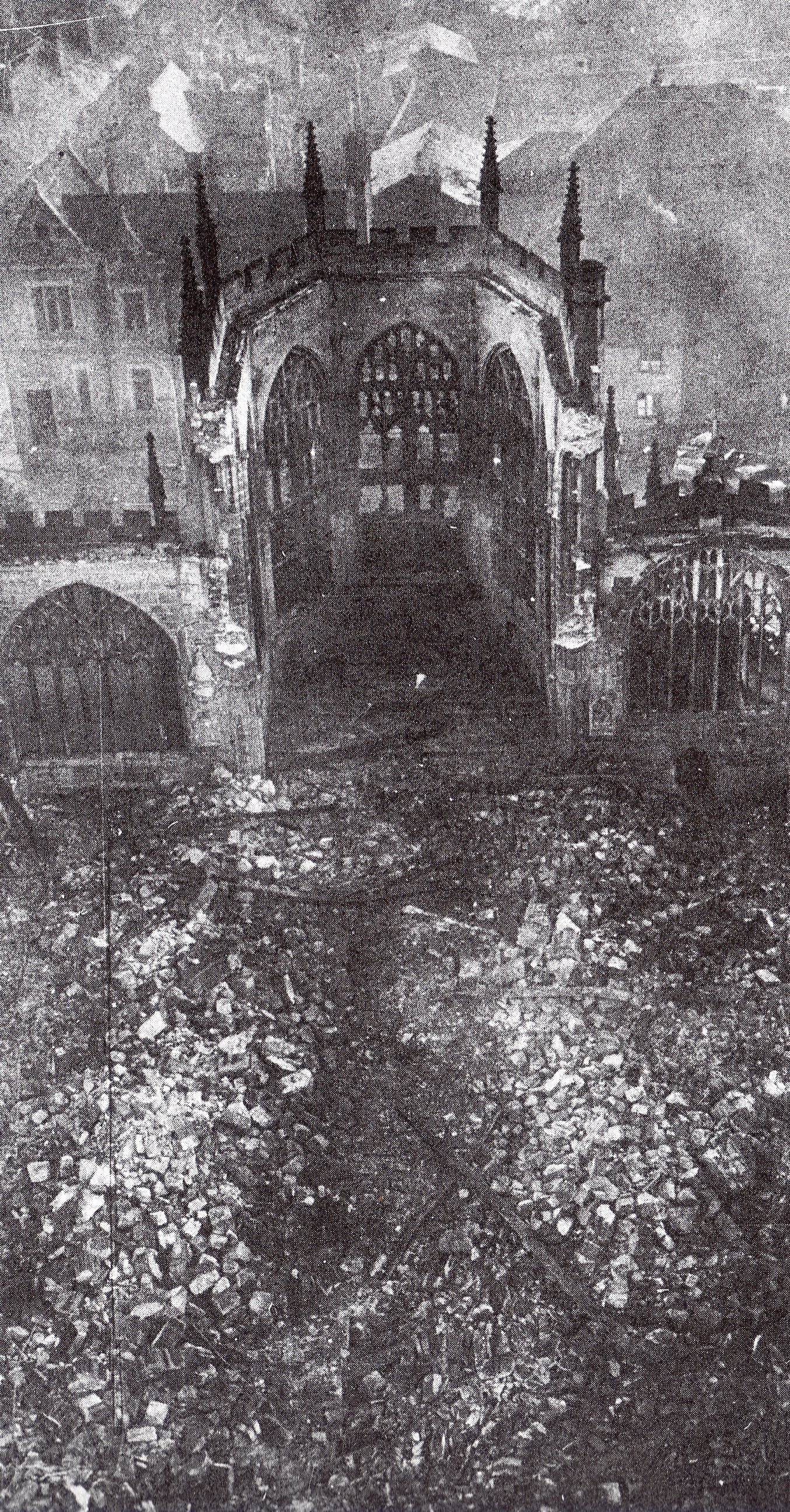
Coventry Cathedral in ruins after the Luftwaffe air raid

The raid that began on the evening of 14 November 1940 was the most severe to hit Coventry during the war. It was carried out by 515 German bombers, of Luftflotte 3 shuttling to the target from their bases in northern France with guidance from the pathfinders of Kampfgruppe 100. The attack, code-named Unternehmen Mondscheinsonate (Operation Moonlight Sonata), was intended to destroy Coventry's factories and industrial infrastructure, although it was clear that damage to the rest of the city, including monuments and residential areas, would be considerable. The initial wave of 13 specially modified Heinkel He 111 aircraft of Kampfgruppe 100, which were equipped with X-Gerät navigational devices, accurately dropped marker flares at 19:20. (Note: The British were on British Summer Time (GMT+1) during the winter months of the war (and double summer time during the summer months).) The British and the Germans were fighting the Battle of the Beams, and on this night, the British failed to disrupt the X-Gerät signals. About 60 bombers did not contribute to the attack, either turning back or attacking alternative targets.

The first wave of follow-up bombers dropped high explosive bombs, knocking out the water supply, electricity network, telephones, and gas mains and cratering the roads, making it difficult for the fire engines to reach fires started by the later waves of bombers. These later waves dropped a combination of high explosive and incendiary bombs. There were two types of incendiary bombs, those made of magnesium and those made of petroleum. The high explosive bombs and the larger air-mines hindered the Coventry fire brigade and were intended to damage roofs, making it easier for the incendiary bombs to fall into buildings and ignite them.

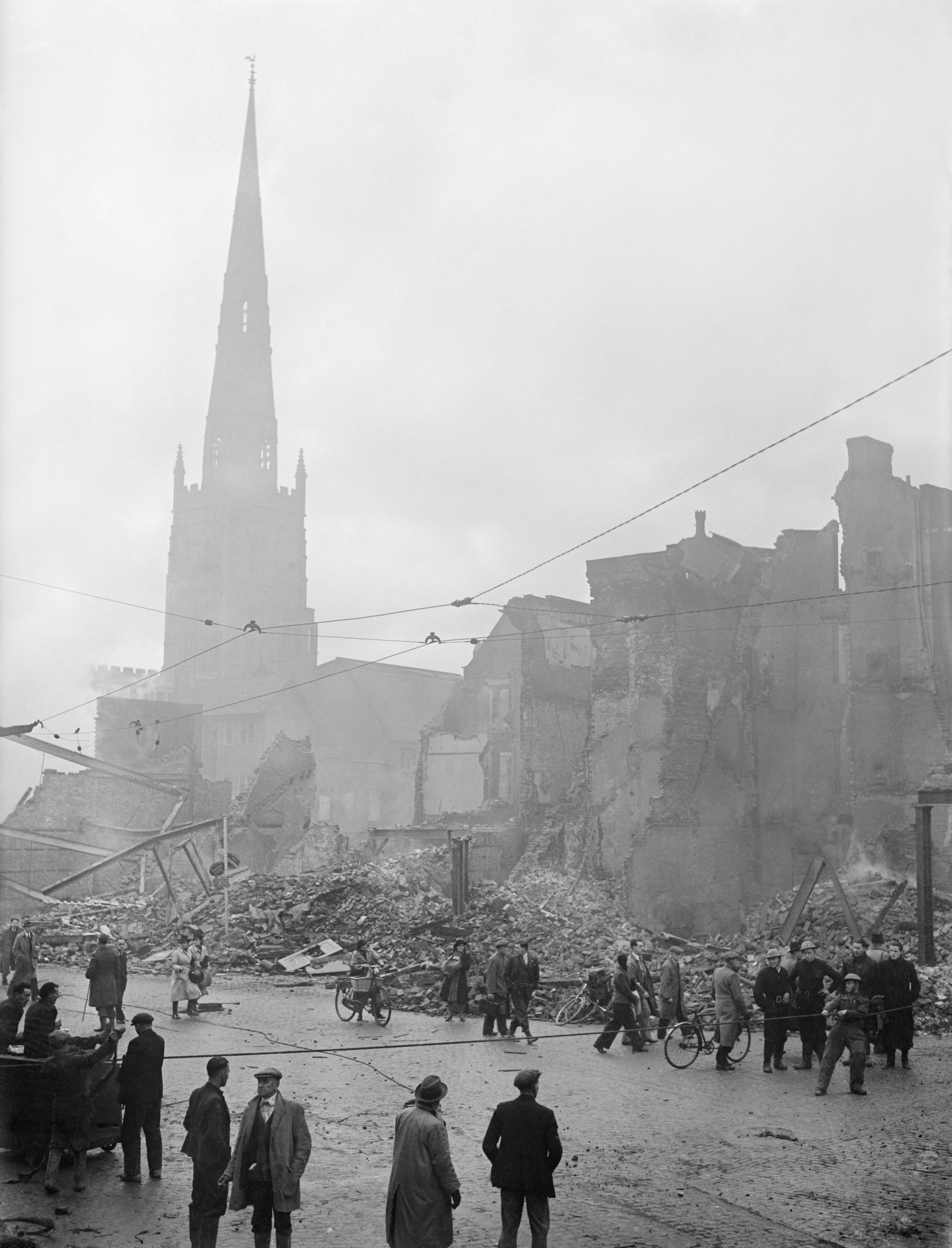
The Holy Trinity Church rises above a scene of devastation

Coventry's air defences consisted of twenty-four 3.7 inch AA guns and twelve 40 mm Bofors. The AA Defence Commander of 95th (Birmingham) Heavy Anti–Aircraft Regiment, Royal Artillery, had prepared a series of concentrations to be fired using sound-locators, GL Mk. I gun-laying radar and 128 concentrations were fired before the bombing severed all lines of communication and the noise drowned out sound-location. The anti-aircraft batteries then fired in isolation. Some gun positions were able to fire at searchlight beam intersections, glimpsed through the smoke and guessing the range. Although the Coventry guns fired 10 rounds a minute for the whole 10 hour raid (a total of over 6,700 rounds), only one German bomber was shot down.

At around 20:00, Coventry Cathedral (dedicated to Saint Michael), was set on fire by incendiaries for the first time. The volunteer firefighters managed to put out the first fire, but other direct hits followed, and soon new fires broke out in the cathedral; accelerated by a firestorm, the flames quickly spread out of control. During the same period, more than 200 other fires were started across the city, most of which were concentrated in the city centre, setting the area ablaze and overwhelming the firefighters. The telephone network was crippled, hampering the fire service's command and control and making it difficult to send firefighters to the most dangerous blazes first; as the Germans had intended, the water mains were damaged by high explosives, meaning there was not enough water available to tackle many of the fires. The raid reached its climax around midnight with the final all clear sounding at 06:15 on the morning of 15 November.

In one night, more than 4,300 homes in Coventry were destroyed, and around two-thirds of the city's buildings were damaged. Most of the city centre was destroyed. Two hospitals, two churches, and a police station were also damaged. The local police force lost nine constables or messengers in the blitz. Approximately one third of the city's factories were destroyed or severely damaged, another third were badly damaged, and the rest suffered slight damage. Among the destroyed factories were the main Daimler factory, the Humber Hillman factory, the Alfred Herbert Ltd machine-tool works, nine aircraft factories, and two naval ordnance stores. The effects on war production were only temporary, as much essential war production had already been moved to 'shadow factories' on the city outskirts. Also, many of the damaged factories were quickly repaired and had recovered to full production within a few months.

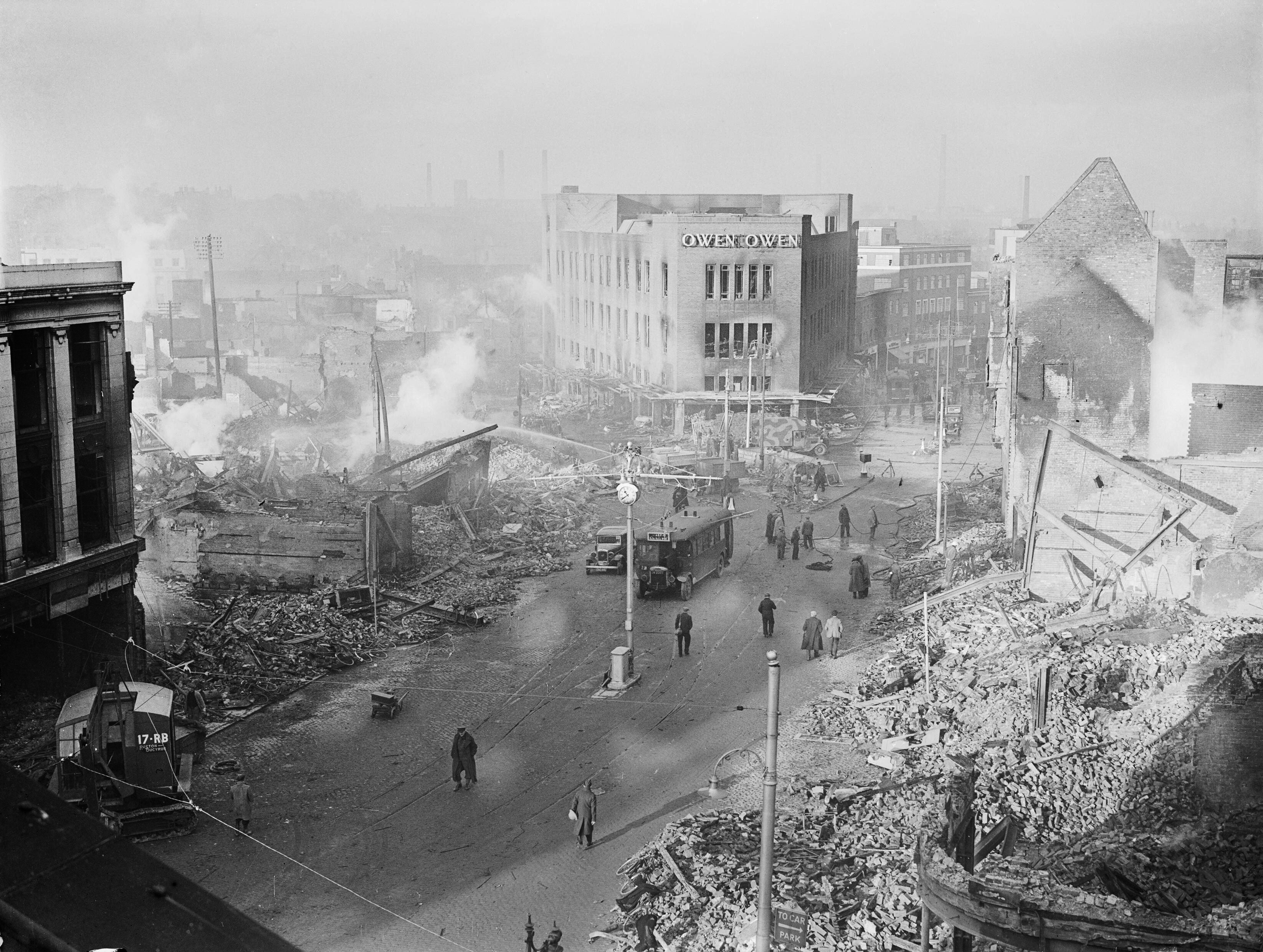
The city centre following the 14 November air raid

An estimated 568 people were killed in the raid (the exact figure was never confirmed), with another 863 badly injured and 393 sustaining lesser injuries. Given the intensity of the raid, casualties were limited by the fact that a large number of Coventrians "trekked" out of the city at night to sleep in nearby towns or villages following the earlier air raids. Also, people who took to air raid shelters suffered very little death or injury. Out of 79 public air raid shelters holding 33,000 people, very few had been destroyed. Although the city centre suffered the heaviest raids, districts of the city including Stoke Heath, Foleshill and Wyken were also bombed.

The raid reached such a new and severe level of destruction that Joseph Goebbels later used the term coventriert ("coventried") when describing similar levels of destruction of other enemy towns. During the raid, the Germans dropped about 500 t (490 long tons; 550 short tons) of high explosives, including 50 parachute air-mines, of which 20 were incendiary petroleum mines, and 36,000 incendiary bombs.

The raid of 14 November combined several innovations which influenced all future strategic bomber raids during the war. These were:

- The use of pathfinder aircraft with electronic aids to navigate, to mark the targets before the main bomber raid.
- The use of high explosive bombs and air-mines (blockbuster bombs) coupled with thousands of incendiary bombs intended to set the city ablaze in a firestorm.

In the Allied raids later in the war, 500 or more heavy four-engine bombers all delivered their 3,000–6,000 lb (1,400–2,700 kg) bomb loads in a concentrated wave lasting only a few minutes. At Coventry, the German twin-engined bombers carried smaller bomb loads (2,000–4,000 lb (910–1,810 kg)), and attacked in smaller waves. Each bomber flew several sorties over the target, returning to base in France for more bombs. Thus the attack was spread over several hours, and there were lulls in the raid when firefighters and rescuers could reorganise and evacuate civilians. As Arthur Harris, commander of RAF Bomber Command, wrote after the war "Coventry was adequately concentrated in point of space [to start a firestorm], but all the same there was little concentration in point of time".

The British used the opportunity given them by the attack on Coventry to try a new tactic against Germany, which was carried out on 16 December 1940 as part of Operation Abigail Rachel against Mannheim. The British had been waiting for the opportunity to experiment with an incendiary raid, considering it a kind of retaliation for the German raid on Coventry. This was the start of a British drift away from attempting precision attacks on military targets and towards area bombing attacks on cities.

==== Coventry and Ultra ====
In his 1974 book The Ultra Secret, Group Captain F. W. Winterbotham asserted that the British government had advance warning of the attack from Ultra; intercepted German radio messages encrypted with the Enigma cipher machine and decoded by British cryptanalysts at Bletchley Park. He further claimed that Winston Churchill ordered that no defensive measures should be taken to protect Coventry, lest the Germans suspect that their cipher had been broken. Winterbotham was a key figure for Ultra and supervised the Special Liaison Officers who delivered Ultra material to field commanders. Winterbotham's claim has been rejected by other Ultra participants and by historians. They state that while Churchill was indeed aware that a major bombing raid would take place, no one knew what the target would be.

A few days before the attack, Ultra had identified Mondschein Sonate (Moonlight Sonata) as a probable code for a planned group of attacks on three possible targets over several possible days. The targets had the code names Einheitpreis, Regenschirm and Korn. The day before the Coventry raid, a prisoner mentioned Regenschirm (umbrella), which was assumed to mean umbrella man (Neville Chamberlain) who was born in Birmingham, it would be bombed on 19/20 November. Einheitpreis (unit-price) was identified later, which was tied to sixpence at Woolworths, meaning Wolverhampton. Korn was unidentified. Peter Calvocoressi was head of the Air Section at Bletchley Park, which translated and analysed all deciphered Luftwaffe messages. He wrote "Ultra never mentioned Coventry. ... Churchill, so far from pondering whether to save Coventry or safeguard Ultra, was under the impression that the raid was to be on London".

The scientist R. V. Jones, who led the British side in the Battle of the Beams, wrote that "Enigma signals to the X-beam stations were not broken in time" and that he was unaware that Coventry was the intended target. The British were yet unaware that the Luftwaffe had moved from their pilots manually listening to the signals to an automatic narrow-band receiver on board, which caused jamming counter-measures to be ineffective. Jones also noted that Churchill returned to London that afternoon, which indicated that Churchill believed that London was the likely target for the raid.

Since 1996, the Ultra decrypts for the period have been available in the National Archives. Between 07:35 GMT on 10 November 1940 and 05:00 on 11 November, a German signal was deciphered and given the serial number CX/JQ/444, paragraph 4. The message set out code words to be used by aircraft on an operation named Mondschein Sonat but did not give Coventry as the target or a date. It said that transmission of a figure 9 would denote Korn and hindsight has recognised that to be the code name for Coventry. This was not known at the time even though Paula had been identified as Paris and Loge as London. Korn was used in two reports from an aircraft taking part in a raid on Southampton on 30 November, two weeks after the Coventry Blitz. Another decrypt on 11 November or early on 12 November gave navigational beam settings for Wolverhampton, Birmingham, and Coventry but no dates. There was a hiatus in Ultra decrypts from 01:15 GMT on 13 November until 02:40 on 15 November by which time the raid was well under way: Churchill could not have acted on new Ultra intelligence on the afternoon or evening of the attack because there was none to give him. Intelligence from captured airmen and documents did not offer an unambiguous picture either.

=== April 1941 ===
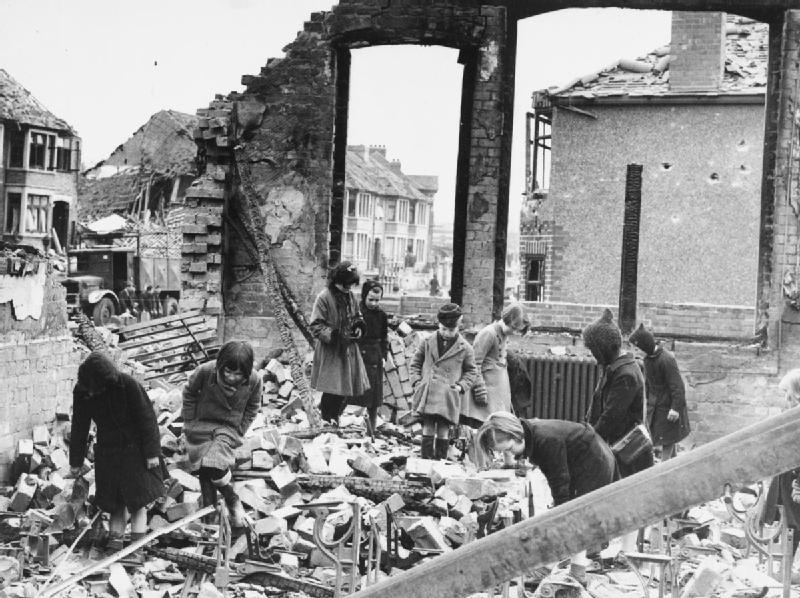
Children searching for books among the ruins of their school after the April raid

On the night of 8/9 April 1941 Coventry was subject to another large air raid when 230 bombers attacked the city, dropping 315 t (310 long tons; 347 short tons) of high explosive and 25,000 incendiaries. In this and another raid two nights later on 10/11 April about 451 people were killed and over 700 seriously injured. Damage was caused to many buildings including some factories, the central police station, the Coventry & Warwickshire Hospital, King Henry VIII School, and St. Mary's Hall. The main architectural casualty of the raid was Christ Church, most of which was destroyed, leaving only the spire. It was after this raid that the then-Mayor of Coventry, Alfred Robert Grindlay, led the early reconstruction of much of the city centre.

=== August 1942 ===
The final air raid on Coventry came on 3 August 1942, in the Stoke Heath district, approximately one mile to the east of the city centre. Six people were killed. By the time of this air raid, some 1,236 people had been killed by air raids on Coventry; of these, 808 rest in the mass grave in London Road Cemetery. Around 80 per cent of them had been killed in the raids of 14/15 November 1940 and 8–10 April 1941.

== Aftermath ==
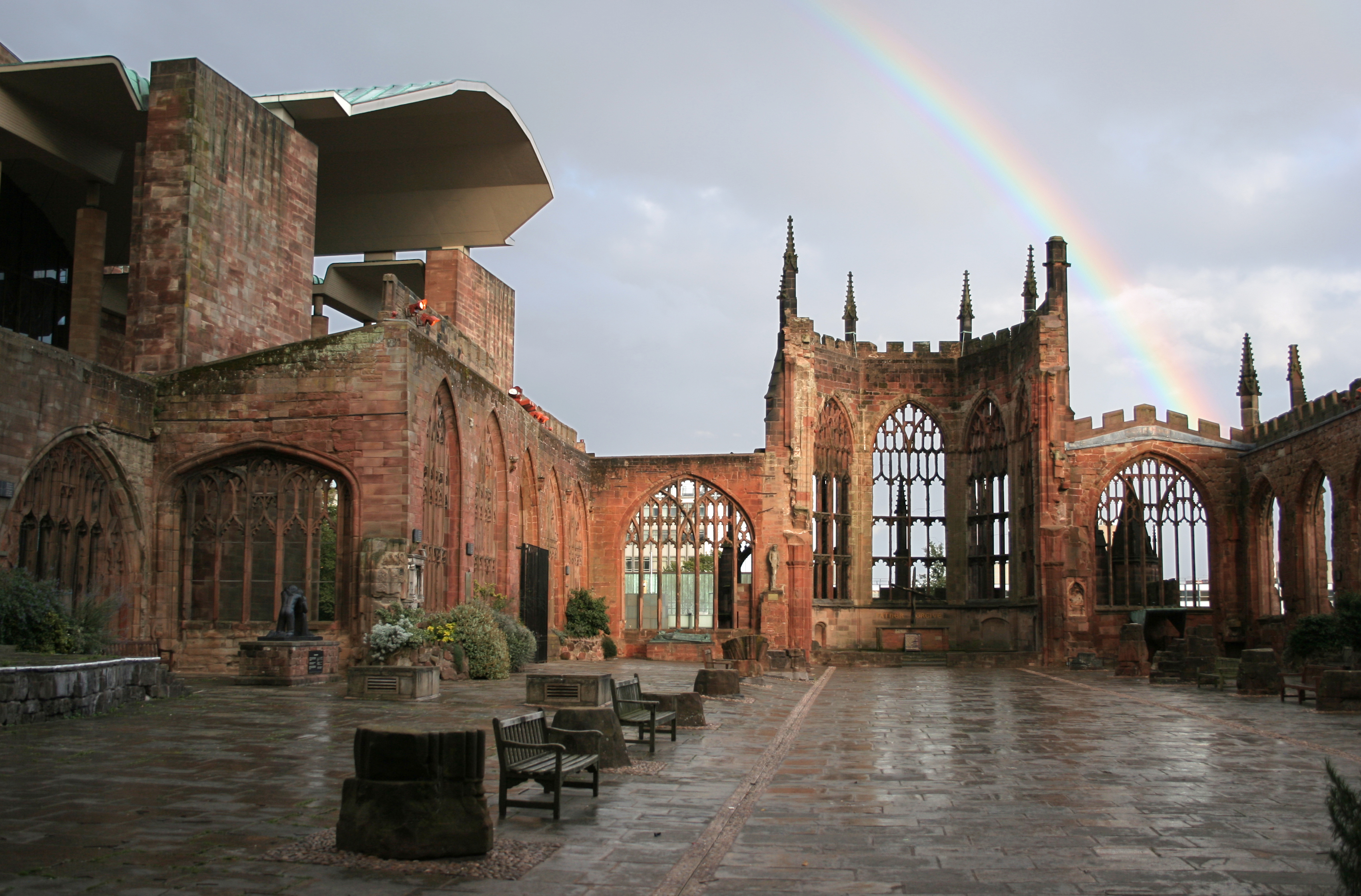
The ruins of the old Coventry Cathedral, the most visible modern-day reminder of the Blitz

The Blitz gave rise to the German verb Koventrieren (to Coventrate), meaning "to annihilate or reduce to rubble".

Immediate reconstruction was undertaken by a committee headed by motor-industry magnate William Rootes (the Rootes Group had several factories in the area, including a factory producing aircraft). In the aftermath of the war, Coventry city centre was extensively rebuilt according to the Gibson Plan compiled by the town planner Donald Gibson, a novel scheme which created a pedestrianised shopping precinct.

Coventry Cathedral was left as a ruin, and is today still the principal reminder of the bombing. A new cathedral was constructed alongside the ruin in the 1950s, designed by the architect Basil Spence. Spence (later knighted for this work) insisted that instead of rebuilding the old cathedral, it should be kept in ruins as a garden of remembrance and that the new cathedral should be built alongside, the two buildings together forming one church. The use of Hollington sandstone for the new Coventry Cathedral provides an element of unity between the buildings.

The foundation stone of the new cathedral was laid by Elizabeth II on 23 March 1956. It was consecrated on 25 May 1962, and Benjamin Britten's War Requiem, composed for the occasion, was premièred in the new cathedral on 30 May to mark its consecration.

Spon Street was one of the few areas of the city centre to survive the Blitz largely intact, and during the post-war redevelopment of Coventry, several surviving medieval buildings from across the city were moved to it. The 14th century St. Mary's Guildhall in Bayley Lane, opposite the ruined cathedral, also survived and stands to this day. However, in addition to destroying many historic buildings, the bombing revealed a mediaeval stone building on Much Park Street, thought to date from the 13th or 14th century.

== See also ==
- 1939 Coventry bombing
- Die Luftwacht
- Birmingham Blitz
- One Night in November – 2008 play by Alan Pollock about the Coventry Blitz
