= 2013 Six Nations Championship squads =

Rugby union competition squads

The 2013 Six Nations Championship was a rugby union tournament played from 2 February to 16 March 2013. It was the 14th annual Six Nations Championship since the addition of Italy to the initial five of England, France, Ireland, Scotland and Wales, and the 119th season of the competition overall. Teams were permitted to name squads of unlimited size, but typically named between 30 and 35 players in their initial selections.

All ages, caps and clubs accurate as of 2 February 2013, the first day of the tournament. Additions to each squad following the initial announcements are indicated by an asterisk (*).

== England ==
England head coach Stuart Lancaster named an initial 33-man squad for the tournament on 9 January 2013.

Note: Flags indicate national union for the club/province as defined by World Rugby.

Player	Position	Date of birth (age)	Caps	Club/province
Dylan Hartley	Hooker	24 March 1986 (aged 26)	42	(England) Northampton Saints
Tom Youngs	Hooker	28 January 1987 (aged 26)	4	(England) Leicester Tigers
Dan Cole	Prop	9 May 1987 (aged 25)	35	(England) Leicester Tigers
Alex Corbisiero	Prop	30 August 1988 (aged 24)	18	(England) London Irish
Joe Marler	Prop	7 July 1990 (aged 22)	5	(England) Harlequins
Mako Vunipola	Prop	13 January 1991 (aged 22)	4	(England) Saracens
David Wilson	Prop	9 April 1985 (aged 27)	22	(England) Bath
Joe Launchbury	Lock	12 April 1991 (aged 21)	4	(England) London Wasps
Courtney Lawes	Lock	23 February 1989 (aged 23)	15	(England) Northampton Saints
Geoff Parling	Lock	28 October 1983 (aged 29)	12	(England) Leicester Tigers
Calum Clark	Flanker	10 June 1989 (aged 23)	0	(England) Northampton Saints
Tom Croft	Flanker	7 November 1985 (aged 27)	36	(England) Leicester Tigers
James Haskell	Flanker	2 April 1985 (aged 27)	45	(England) London Wasps
Tom Johnson	Flanker	16 July 1982 (aged 30)	5	(England) Exeter Chiefs
Chris Robshaw (c)	Flanker	4 June 1986 (aged 26)	12	(England) Harlequins
Tom Wood	Flanker	3 November 1986 (aged 26)	13	(England) Northampton Saints
Ben Morgan	Number 8	18 February 1989 (aged 23)	8	(England) Gloucester
Thomas Waldrom	Number 8	28 April 1983 (aged 29)	4	(England) Leicester Tigers
Danny Care	Scrum-half	2 January 1987 (aged 26)	37	(England) Harlequins
Lee Dickson	Scrum-half	29 March 1985 (aged 27)	7	(England) Northampton Saints
Ben Youngs	Scrum-half	5 September 1989 (aged 23)	28	(England) Leicester Tigers
Freddie Burns	Fly-half	13 May 1990 (aged 22)	1	(England) Gloucester
Owen Farrell	Fly-half	24 September 1991 (aged 21)	12	(England) Saracens
Toby Flood	Fly-half	8 August 1985 (aged 27)	53	(England) Leicester Tigers
Brad Barritt	Centre	7 August 1986 (aged 26)	11	(England) Saracens
Jonathan Joseph	Centre	21 May 1991 (aged 21)	4	(England) London Irish
Manu Tuilagi	Centre	18 May 1991 (aged 21)	17	(England) Leicester Tigers
Billy Twelvetrees	Centre	15 November 1988 (aged 24)	0	(England) Gloucester
Chris Ashton	Wing	29 March 1987 (aged 25)	29	(England) Saracens
Mike Brown	Wing	4 September 1985 (aged 27)	11	(England) Harlequins
David Strettle	Wing	23 July 1983 (aged 29)	12	(England) Saracens
Ben Foden	Fullback	22 July 1985 (aged 27)	30	(England) Northampton Saints
Alex Goode	Fullback	7 May 1988 (aged 24)	6	(England) Saracens

== France ==
France head coach Philippe Saint-André named a 33-man squad for the tournament on 11 January 2013. Adrien Planté replaced Gaël Fickou and Hugo Bonneval replaced Vincent Clerc.

Note: Flags indicate national union for the club/province as defined by World Rugby.

Player	Position	Date of birth (age)	Caps	Club/province
Guilhem Guirado	Hooker	17 June 1986 (aged 26)	15	(France) Perpignan
Benjamin Kayser	Hooker	26 July 1984 (aged 28)	12	(France) Clermont
Dimitri Szarzewski	Hooker	26 January 1983 (aged 30)	66	(France) Racing Métro
David Attoub	Prop	7 June 1981 (aged 31)	4	(France) Stade Français
Vincent Debaty	Prop	2 October 1981 (aged 31)	11	(France) Clermont
Thomas Domingo	Prop	20 August 1985 (aged 27)	21	(France) Clermont
Luc Ducalcon	Prop	2 January 1984 (aged 29)	10	(France) Racing Métro
Yannick Forestier	Prop	3 January 1982 (aged 31)	3	(France) Castres
Nicolas Mas	Prop	23 May 1980 (aged 32)	56	(France) Perpignan
Yoann Maestri	Lock	14 January 1988 (aged 25)	9	(France) Toulouse
Pascal Papé (c)	Lock	5 October 1980 (aged 32)	45	(France) Stade Français
Jocelino Suta	Lock	18 November 1982 (aged 30)	3	(France) Toulon
Romain Taofifénua	Lock	14 September 1990 (aged 22)	1	(France) Perpignan
Thierry Dusautoir	Flanker	18 November 1981 (aged 31)	54	(France) Toulouse
Wenceslas Lauret	Flanker	28 March 1989 (aged 23)	3	(France) Biarritz
Yannick Nyanga	Flanker	19 December 1983 (aged 29)	28	(France) Toulouse
Fulgence Ouedraogo	Flanker	21 July 1986 (aged 26)	30	(France) Montpellier
Damien Chouly	Number 8	27 November 1985 (aged 27)	7	(France) Clermont
Louis Picamoles	Number 8	5 February 1986 (aged 26)	31	(France) Toulouse
Maxime Machenaud	Scrum-half	30 December 1988 (aged 24)	4	(France) Racing Métro
Morgan Parra	Scrum-half	15 November 1988 (aged 24)	46	(France) Clermont
Frédéric Michalak	Fly-half	16 October 1982 (aged 30)	59	(France) Toulon
François Trinh-Duc	Fly-half	11 November 1986 (aged 26)	44	(France) Montpellier
Mathieu Bastareaud	Centre	17 September 1988 (aged 24)	9	(France) Toulon
Gaël Fickou	Centre	26 March 1994 (aged 18)	0	(France) Toulouse
Florian Fritz	Centre	17 January 1984 (aged 29)	25	(France) Toulouse
Maxime Mermoz	Centre	28 July 1986 (aged 26)	22	(France) Toulon
Jean-Marcellin Buttin	Wing	16 December 1991 (aged 21)	2	(France) Clermont
Vincent Clerc	Wing	7 May 1981 (aged 31)	64	(France) Toulouse
Benjamin Fall	Wing	3 March 1989 (aged 23)	3	(France) Racing Métro
Wesley Fofana	Wing	20 January 1988 (aged 25)	10	(France) Clermont
Adrien Planté*	Wing	2 April 1985 (age 41)	0	(France) Perpignan
Hugo Bonneval*	Fullback	19 November 1990 (age 36)	0	(France) Stade Français
Brice Dulin	Fullback	13 April 1990 (aged 22)	5	(France) Castres
Yoann Huget	Fullback	2 June 1987 (aged 25)	12	(France) Toulouse

== Ireland ==
Ireland head coach Declan Kidney named an initial 33-man squad for the tournament on 27 January 2013. Flanker Rhys Ruddock, centre Darren Cave, wing Andrew Trimble and fullback Robbie Henshaw were added to the squad on 5 February, following injuries to Peter O'Mahony, Gordon D'Arcy and Keith Earls. Prop Stephen Archer and fly-half Ian Madigan were added to the squad on 7 March, following injuries to Tom Court and Johnny Sexton.

Note: Flags indicate national union for the club/province as defined by World Rugby.

Player	Position	Date of birth (age)	Caps	Club/province
Rory Best	Hooker	15 August 1982 (age 44)	62	(Ireland) Ulster
Seán Cronin	Hooker	6 May 1986 (age 40)	23	(Ireland) Leinster
Mike Sherry	Hooker	18 June 1988 (age 38)	0	(Ireland) Munster
Stephen Archer*	Prop	29 January 1988 (age 38)	0	(Ireland) Munster
Michael Bent	Prop	25 April 1986 (age 40)	2	(Ireland) Leinster
Tom Court	Prop	6 November 1980 (age 46)	29	(Ireland) Ulster
Declan Fitzpatrick	Prop	12 July 1983 (age 43)	2	(Ireland) Ulster
Cian Healy	Prop	7 October 1987 (age 39)	35	(Ireland) Leinster
Dave Kilcoyne	Prop	14 December 1988 (age 37)	2	(Ireland) Munster
Mike Ross	Prop	21 December 1979 (age 46)	24	(Ireland) Leinster
Mike McCarthy	Lock	27 November 1981 (age 44)	6	(Ireland) Connacht
Donncha O'Callaghan	Lock	24 March 1979 (age 47)	90	(Ireland) Munster
Donnacha Ryan	Lock	11 December 1983 (age 42)	23	(Ireland) Munster
Devin Toner	Lock	29 June 1986 (age 40)	3	(Ireland) Leinster
Iain Henderson	Flanker	21 February 1992 (age 34)	2	(Ireland) Ulster
Chris Henry	Flanker	17 October 1984 (age 42)	4	(Ireland) Ulster
Kevin McLaughlin	Flanker	20 September 1984 (age 42)	5	(Ireland) Leinster
Seán O'Brien	Flanker	14 February 1987 (age 39)	22	(Ireland) Leinster
Peter O'Mahony	Flanker	17 September 1989 (age 37)	9	(Ireland) Munster
Rhys Ruddock*	Flanker	13 November 1990 (age 36)	1	(Ireland) Leinster
Jamie Heaslip (c)	Number 8	15 December 1983 (age 42)	52	(Ireland) Leinster
Conor Murray	Scrum-half	20 April 1989 (age 37)	14	(Ireland) Munster
Eoin Reddan	Scrum-half	20 November 1980 (age 46)	47	(Ireland) Leinster
Paddy Jackson	Fly-half	5 January 1992 (age 34)	0	(Ireland) Ulster
Ian Madigan*	Fly-half	21 March 1989 (age 37)	0	(Ireland) Leinster
Ronan O'Gara	Fly-half	7 March 1977 (age 49)	126	(Ireland) Munster
Johnny Sexton	Fly-half	11 July 1985 (age 41)	34	(Ireland) Leinster
Darren Cave*	Centre	5 April 1987 (age 39)	3	(Ireland) Ulster
Gordon D'Arcy	Centre	10 February 1980 (age 46)	71	(Ireland) Leinster
Keith Earls	Centre	2 October 1987 (age 39)	34	(Ireland) Munster
Fergus McFadden	Centre	17 June 1986 (age 40)	16	(Ireland) Leinster
Dave McSharry	Centre	10 July 1990 (age 36)	0	(Ireland) Connacht
Brian O'Driscoll	Centre	21 January 1979 (age 47)	120	(Ireland) Leinster
Luke Fitzgerald	Wing	13 September 1987 (age 39)	23	(Ireland) Leinster
Craig Gilroy	Wing	11 March 1991 (age 35)	1	(Ireland) Ulster
Andrew Trimble*	Wing	20 October 1984 (age 42)	49	(Ireland) Ulster
Simon Zebo	Wing	16 March 1990 (age 36)	3	(Ireland) Munster
Robbie Henshaw*	Fullback	12 June 1993 (age 33)	0	(Ireland) Connacht
Rob Kearney	Fullback	26 March 1986 (age 40)	41	(Ireland) Leinster

== Italy ==
Italy head coach Jacques Brunel named a 30-man squad for the tournament. Mauro Bergamasco was added to the squad on 18 February after captain Sergio Parisse was given a 30-day ban for the red card he received playing for his club side Stade Français in a Top 14 match against Union Bordeaux Bègles on 16 February.

Note: Flags indicate national union for the club/province as defined by World Rugby.

Player	Position	Date of birth (age)	Caps	Club/province
Leonardo Ghiraldini	Hooker	26 December 1984 (aged 28)	48	(Italy) Benetton Treviso
Davide Giazzon	Hooker	16 January 1986 (aged 27)	5	(Italy) Zebre
Martin Castrogiovanni	Prop	21 October 1981 (aged 31)	91	(England) Leicester Tigers
Lorenzo Cittadini	Prop	17 December 1982 (aged 30)	16	(Italy) Benetton Treviso
Alberto de Marchi	Prop	13 March 1986 (aged 26)	4	(Italy) Benetton Treviso
Andrea Lo Cicero	Prop	7 May 1976 (aged 36)	98	(France) Racing Métro
Michele Rizzo	Prop	16 September 1982 (aged 30)	5	(Italy) Benetton Treviso
Joshua Furno	Lock	21 October 1989 (aged 23)	6	(France) Narbonne
Quintin Geldenhuys	Lock	19 June 1981 (aged 31)	33	(Italy) Zebre
Francesco Minto	Lock	20 May 1987 (aged 25)	2	(Italy) Benetton Treviso
Antonio Pavanello	Lock	13 October 1982 (aged 30)	13	(Italy) Benetton Treviso
Robert Barbieri	Flanker	5 June 1984 (aged 28)	27	(Italy) Benetton Treviso
Mauro Bergamasco*	Flanker	1 May 1979 (age 47)	93	(Italy) Zebre
Paul Derbyshire	Flanker	3 November 1986 (aged 26)	16	(Italy) Benetton Treviso
Simone Favaro	Flanker	7 November 1988 (aged 24)	16	(Italy) Benetton Treviso
Alessandro Zanni	Flanker	31 January 1984 (aged 29)	69	(Italy) Benetton Treviso
Sergio Parisse (c)	Number 8	12 September 1983 (aged 29)	91	(France) Stade Français Paris
Manoa Vosawai	Number 8	12 August 1983 (aged 29)	10	(Italy) Benetton Treviso
Tobias Botes	Scrum-half	26 April 1984 (aged 28)	8	(Italy) Benetton Treviso
Edoardo Gori	Scrum-half	5 March 1990 (aged 22)	19	(Italy) Benetton Treviso
Kris Burton	Fly-half	4 August 1980 (aged 32)	18	(Italy) Benetton Treviso
Luciano Orquera	Fly-half	12 October 1981 (aged 31)	29	(Italy) Zebre
Gonzalo Canale	Centre	11 November 1982 (aged 30)	77	(France) La Rochelle
Gonzalo García	Centre	18 February 1984 (aged 28)	25	(Italy) Zebre
Andrea Masi	Centre	30 March 1981 (aged 31)	72	(England) London Wasps
Alberto Sgarbi	Centre	26 November 1986 (aged 26)	23	(Italy) Benetton Treviso
Tommaso Benvenuti	Wing	12 December 1990 (aged 22)	23	(Italy) Benetton Treviso
Tommaso Iannone	Wing	16 September 1990 (aged 22)	1	(Italy) Benetton Treviso
Giovanbattista Venditti	Wing	27 March 1990 (aged 22)	9	(Italy) Zebre
Paolo Buso	Fullback	28 July 1986 (aged 26)	1	(Italy) Zebre
Luke McLean	Fullback	29 June 1987 (aged 25)	41	(Italy) Benetton Treviso

== Scotland ==
Scotland interim head coach Scott Johnson named a 35-man squad for the tournament on 14 January 2013.

Note: Flags indicate national union for the club/province as defined by World Rugby.

Player	Position	Date of birth (age)	Caps	Club/province
Ross Ford	Hooker	23 April 1984 (age 42)	64	(Scotland) Edinburgh
Dougie Hall	Hooker	24 September 1980 (age 46)	39	(Scotland) Glasgow Warriors
Pat MacArthur	Hooker	27 April 1987 (age 39)	0	(Scotland) Glasgow Warriors
Geoff Cross	Prop	11 December 1982 (age 43)	17	(Scotland) Edinburgh
Alasdair Dickinson	Prop	11 September 1983 (age 43)	24	(England) Sale Sharks
Ryan Grant	Prop	8 October 1985 (age 41)	5	(Scotland) Glasgow Warriors
Moray Low	Prop	28 November 1984 (age 41)	15	(Scotland) Glasgow Warriors
Euan Murray	Prop	7 August 1980 (age 46)	49	(England) Worcester Warriors
Grant Gilchrist	Lock	9 August 1990 (age 36)	0	(Scotland) Edinburgh
Richie Gray	Lock	24 August 1989 (age 37)	27	(England) Sale Sharks
Jim Hamilton	Lock	17 November 1982 (age 44)	41	(England) Gloucester
Alastair Kellock	Lock	14 June 1981 (age 45)	47	(Scotland) Glasgow Warriors
Kelly Brown (c)	Flanker	8 June 1982 (age 44)	52	(England) Saracens
David Denton	Flanker	5 February 1990 (age 36)	9	(Scotland) Edinburgh
Chris Fusaro	Flanker	21 July 1989 (age 37)	10	(Scotland) Glasgow Warriors
Rob Harley	Flanker	26 May 1990 (age 36)	1	(Scotland) Glasgow Warriors
Alasdair Strokosch	Flanker	21 February 1983 (age 43)	30	(France) USA Perpignan
Richie Vernon	Flanker	7 July 1987 (age 39)	15	(England) Sale Sharks
Johnnie Beattie	Number 8	21 November 1985 (age 41)	16	(France) Montpellier
Ryan Wilson	Number 8	18 May 1989 (age 37)	0	(Scotland) Glasgow Warriors
Sean Kennedy	Scrum-half	24 April 1991 (age 35)	0	(Scotland) Glasgow Warriors
Greig Laidlaw	Scrum-half	12 October 1985 (age 41)	13	(Scotland) Edinburgh
Henry Pyrgos	Scrum-half	9 July 1989 (age 37)	3	(Scotland) Glasgow Warriors
Tom Heathcote	Fly-half	11 February 1992 (age 34)	1	(England) Bath
Ruaridh Jackson	Fly-half	12 February 1988 (age 38)	15	(Scotland) Glasgow Warriors
Duncan Weir	Fly-half	10 May 1991 (age 35)	2	(Scotland) Glasgow Warriors
Alex Dunbar	Centre	23 April 1990 (age 36)	0	(Scotland) Glasgow Warriors
Max Evans	Centre	28 September 1983 (age 43)	32	(France) Castres
Peter Horne	Centre	5 October 1989 (age 37)	0	(Scotland) Glasgow Warriors
Matt Scott	Centre	30 September 1990 (age 36)	7	(Scotland) Edinburgh
Sean Lamont	Wing	15 January 1981 (age 45)	71	(Scotland) Glasgow Warriors
Sean Maitland	Wing	14 September 1988 (age 38)	0	(Scotland) Glasgow Warriors
Tommy Seymour	Wing	1 July 1988 (age 38)	0	(Scotland) Glasgow Warriors
Tim Visser	Wing	29 May 1987 (age 39)	5	(Scotland) Edinburgh
Stuart Hogg	Fullback	24 June 1992 (age 34)	10	(Scotland) Glasgow Warriors
Peter Murchie	Fullback	7 January 1986 (age 40)	0	(Scotland) Glasgow Warriors

== Wales ==
Wales interim head coach Rob Howley named a 36-man squad for the tournament on 15 January 2013, including five uncapped players. Lock Alun Wyn Jones was called into the squad on 12 February 2013 after recovering from injury.

Note: Flags indicate national union for the club/province as defined by World Rugby.

Player	Position	Date of birth (age)	Caps	Club/province
Richard Hibbard	Hooker	13 December 1983 (age 42)	19	(Wales) Ospreys
Ken Owens	Hooker	3 January 1987 (age 39)	10	(Wales) Scarlets
Matthew Rees	Hooker	9 December 1980 (age 45)	57	(Wales) Scarlets
Scott Andrews	Prop	1 August 1989 (age 37)	5	(Wales) Cardiff Blues
Ryan Bevington	Prop	9 December 1988 (age 37)	8	(Wales) Ospreys
Paul James	Prop	13 May 1982 (age 44)	40	(England) Bath
Gethin Jenkins	Prop	17 November 1980 (age 46)	94	(France) Toulon
Adam Jones	Prop	8 March 1981 (age 45)	83	(Wales) Ospreys
Craig Mitchell	Prop	3 May 1986 (age 40)	11	(England) Exeter Chiefs
Andrew Coombs	Lock	27 October 1984 (age 42)	0	(Wales) Dragons
Ian Evans	Lock	4 October 1984 (age 42)	25	(Wales) Ospreys
Alun Wyn Jones*	Lock	19 September 1985 (age 41)	67	(Wales) Ospreys
James King	Lock	24 July 1990 (age 36)	0	(Wales) Ospreys
Ollie Kohn	Lock	19 May 1981 (age 45)	0	(England) Harlequins
Lou Reed	Lock	10 September 1987 (age 39)	2	(Wales) Cardiff Blues
Ryan Jones	Flanker	13 March 1981 (age 45)	70	(Wales) Ospreys
Josh Navidi	Flanker	30 December 1990 (age 35)	0	(Wales) Cardiff Blues
Aaron Shingler	Flanker	7 August 1987 (age 39)	4	(Wales) Scarlets
Justin Tipuric	Flanker	6 August 1989 (age 37)	10	(Wales) Ospreys
Josh Turnbull	Flanker	12 March 1988 (age 38)	5	(Wales) Scarlets
Sam Warburton (c)	Flanker	5 October 1988 (age 38)	34	(Wales) Cardiff Blues
Taulupe Faletau	Number 8	12 November 1990 (age 36)	21	(Wales) Dragons
Andries Pretorius	Number 8	26 September 1985 (age 41)	0	(Wales) Cardiff Blues
Tavis Knoyle	Scrum-half	2 June 1990 (age 36)	9	(Wales) Scarlets
Mike Phillips	Scrum-half	29 August 1982 (age 44)	72	(France) Bayonne
Lloyd Williams	Scrum-half	30 November 1989 (age 36)	2	(Wales) Cardiff Blues
Dan Biggar	Fly-half	16 October 1989 (age 37)	11	(Wales) Ospreys
James Hook	Fly-half	27 June 1985 (age 41)	67	(France) Perpignan
Jonathan Davies	Centre	5 April 1988 (age 38)	31	(Wales) Scarlets
Jamie Roberts	Centre	8 November 1986 (age 40)	48	(Wales) Cardiff Blues
Scott Williams	Centre	10 October 1990 (age 36)	16	(Wales) Scarlets
Alex Cuthbert	Wing	5 April 1990 (age 36)	13	(Wales) Cardiff Blues
George North	Wing	13 April 1992 (age 34)	26	(Wales) Scarlets
Eli Walker	Wing	28 May 1992 (age 34)	0	(Wales) Ospreys
Lee Byrne	Fullback	1 June 1980 (age 46)	46	(France) Clermont
Leigh Halfpenny	Fullback	22 December 1988 (age 37)	39	(Wales) Cardiff Blues
Liam Williams	Fullback	9 April 1991 (age 35)	2	(Wales) Scarlets
