= 2013 Six Nations Championship =

Northern hemisphere rugby union championship

- Date: 2 February – 16 March 2013
- Countries: England; France; Ireland; Italy; Scotland; Wales

Tournament statistics
- Champions: Wales (26th title)
- Matches played: 15
- Attendance: 1,042,965 (69,531 per match)
- Tries scored: 37 (2.47 per match)
- Top point scorer: (Wales) Leigh Halfpenny (74)
- Top try scorer: (Wales) Alex Cuthbert (4)
- Player of the tournament: (Wales) Leigh Halfpenny
- Official website: Official website

The 2013 Six Nations Championship, known as the 2013 RBS 6 Nations because of the tournament's sponsorship by the Royal Bank of Scotland, was the 14th series of the Six Nations Championship, the annual northern hemisphere rugby union championship. It was contested by England, France, Ireland, Italy, Scotland and Wales.

Including the competition's previous incarnations as the Home Nations Championship and Five Nations Championship, it was the 119th edition of the tournament. Wales won the tournament for the second time in two years, the first time they had won back-to-back championships since their 1978 and 1979 wins. France collected the wooden spoon by finishing last for the first time since 1999. It was also the first time every team managed to win at least 3 competition points (the equivalent of a win and a draw or three draws) since 1974.

== Participants ==
Nation	Stadium			Head coach	Captain
Nation	Home stadium	Capacity	City	Head coach	Captain
England	Twickenham Stadium	82,000	London	(England) Stuart Lancaster	Chris Robshaw
France	Stade de France	81,338	Saint-Denis	(France) Philippe Saint-André	Pascal Papé, Thierry Dusautoir
Ireland	Aviva Stadium	51,700	Dublin	(Ireland) Declan Kidney	Jamie Heaslip
Italy	Stadio Olimpico	72,698	Rome	(France) Jacques Brunel	Sergio Parisse^{2}
Scotland	Murrayfield Stadium	67,144	Edinburgh	(Australia) Scott Johnson (interim)	Kelly Brown
Wales	Millennium Stadium	74,500	Cardiff	(Wales) Rob Howley (caretaker)	Ryan Jones, Sam Warburton, Gethin Jenkins

^{2} Except the round 3 match as he was suspended.

== Overview ==
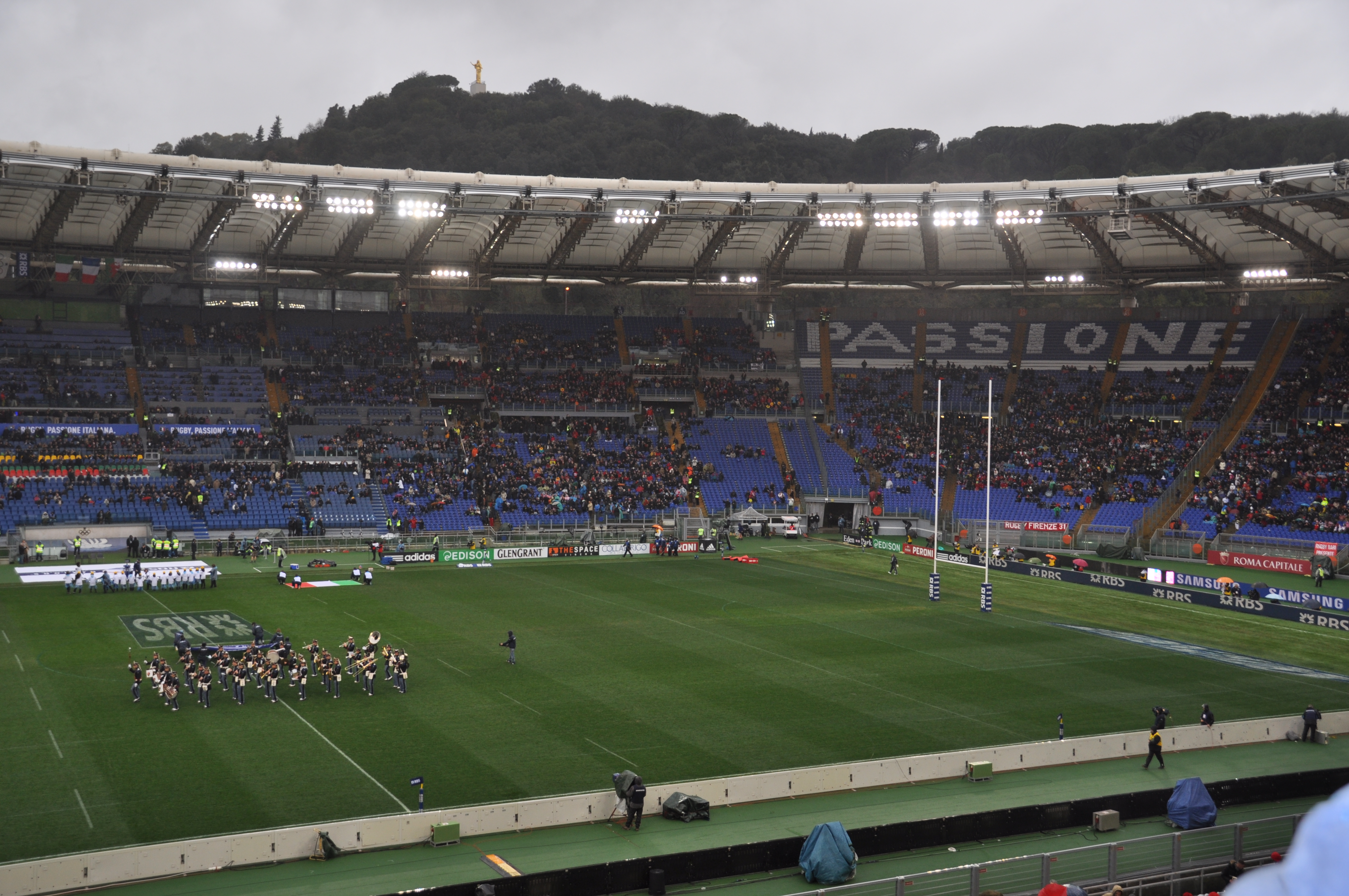
2013 Six Nations Italy vs Wales

At the start of the 2013 Six Nations Championships England were favoured to win by many pundits after they beat the world champion New Zealand team in December 2012. France, enjoying a winning streak prior to the competition, were also considered strong contenders. In contrast defending champions Wales had suffered seven consecutive defeats (4 versus Australia) and were without their regular head coach Warren Gatland. Expectations regarding England and Wales were confirmed in the first round of matches, played on 2 February, with England enjoying a convincing 38–18 victory against Scotland and Wales losing 22–30 against Ireland despite a Welsh comeback from 3-30 down just after half time. France however were upset in their first game, going down 23–18 against Italy. The following week both England and Wales won their matches, against Ireland and France respectively. Scotland meanwhile beat Italy 34–10 in the other game, their first Six Nations victory since 2011. In round three Wales defeated Italy 9–26 and England beat France 23–13. In the remaining match, Scotland defeated Ireland for a second consecutive victory. Wales won their round four clash against Scotland 26-13 and in the process achieved a record fifth consecutive away win in the Six Nations. England remained undefeated after beating Italy 18-11. Ireland and France tied 13–13, giving France their first points in the competition.

England having won all four matches to this point (on 8 points) and Wales with three victories (6 points) meant that their match against each other in the final week, on 16 March, would determine the champions. A victory by Wales would give them two points and put them on equal footing with England. If they won by more than seven points they would move ahead on points differential and retain the title. England were slight favourites heading into the game due to their unbeaten run, although Wales had the advantage of a more experienced side and playing at home in the Millennium Stadium. Going into the final round Scotland were on 4 points, Ireland on 3, Italy on 2 and France on 1. Italy ended up beating Ireland and Scotland lost to France, giving Scotland and Italy 4 points each (with Scotland finishing ahead on points differential) and Ireland and France 3 points each (with Ireland finishing ahead on points differential). France ended up with the wooden spoon, the first time they had finished last in the competition since 1999.

Wales defeated England by an emphatic 30–3, their biggest ever win over England. At half time Wales had just a 9-3 lead, with three penalties to fullback Leigh Halfpenny against one from England's Owen Farrell. The first 20 minutes of the second half saw Wales score points through a try to winger Alex Cuthbert, and another penalty goal to Halfpenny. This gave them a comfortable 17-3 lead heading into the last quarter of the game. Wales fly half Dan Biggar dropped a goal, which was then followed by a second try to Cuthbert in the 66th minute to put the game beyond England. Biggar kicked a final penalty with 10 minutes to go to give Wales their 30–3 victory. Wales coach Rob Howley described the victory as a better achievement than their 2012 Grand Slam and Welsh captain Sam Warburton described the win as the "best moment" of his career. England coach Stuart Lancaster admitted that his side "didn't turn up" to their final match.

== Table ==
Pos	Team	Pld	W	D	L	PF	PA	PD	T	Pts
1	Wales	5	4	0	1	122	66	+56	9	8
2	England	5	4	0	1	94	78	+16	5	8
3	Scotland	5	2	0	3	98	107	−9	7	4
4	Italy	5	2	0	3	75	111	−36	5	4
5	Ireland	5	1	1	3	72	81	−9	5	3
6	France	5	1	1	3	73	91	−18	6	3

Source: ESPN

== Fixtures ==
As with the 2012 Six Nations Championship, there were no Friday night fixtures.

=== Round 1 ===
2 February 2013
13:30 GMT (UTC+0)

Wales	22–30	Ireland
Try: Cuthbert 47' c Halfpenny 58' m Mitchell 75' c Con: Halfpenny (2/3) 49', 76'; Pen: Halfpenny (1/1) 33'	Report	Try: Zebo 10' c Healy 23' c O'Driscoll 42' c Con: Sexton (3/3) 11', 25', 43'; Pen: Sexton (3/3) 20', 28', 40'

Millennium Stadium, Cardiff
Attendance: 71,254
Referee: Romain Poite (France)

FB	15	Leigh Halfpenny
RW	14	Alex Cuthbert
OC	13	Jonathan Davies
IC	12	Jamie Roberts
LW	11	George North
FH	10	Dan Biggar	(substituted off) 73'
SH	9	Mike Phillips	(substituted off) 63'
N8	8	Taulupe Faletau
OF	7	Sam Warburton (c)
BF	6	Aaron Shingler	(substituted off) 44'
RL	5	Ian Evans	(substituted off) 73'
LL	4	Andrew Coombs
TP	3	Adam Jones	(substituted off) 73'
HK	2	Matthew Rees	13' to 21'		(substituted off) 51'
LP	1	Gethin Jenkins	38' to 40'		(substituted off) 66'
Replacements:
HK	16	Ken Owens	(substituted on) 13'	(substituted off) 21'	(substituted on) 51'
PR	17	Paul James	(substituted on) 38'	(substituted off) 40'	(substituted on) 66'
PR	18	Craig Mitchell	(substituted on) 73'
LK	19	Ollie Kohn	(substituted on) 73'
FL	20	Justin Tipuric	(substituted on) 44'
SH	21	Lloyd Williams	(substituted on) 63'
FH	22	James Hook	(substituted on) 73'
CE	23	Scott Williams
Coach:
(Wales) Rob Howley

FB	15	Rob Kearney
RW	14	Craig Gilroy
OC	13	Brian O'Driscoll
IC	12	Gordon D'Arcy		(substituted off) 44'
LW	11	Simon Zebo
FH	10	Johnny Sexton
SH	9	Conor Murray	(yellow card) 69'	(substituted off) 79'
N8	8	Jamie Heaslip (c)
OF	7	Seán O'Brien
BF	6	Peter O'Mahony		(substituted off) 51'
RL	5	Donnacha Ryan
LL	4	Mike McCarthy		(substituted off) 73'
TP	3	Mike Ross		(substituted off) 68'
HK	2	Rory Best	(yellow card) 57'
LP	1	Cian Healy		(substituted off) 73'
Replacements:
HK	16	Seán Cronin
PR	17	Dave Kilcoyne		(substituted on) 73'
PR	18	Declan Fitzpatrick		(substituted on) 68'
LK	19	Donncha O'Callaghan		(substituted on) 73'
FL	20	Chris Henry		(substituted on) 51'
SH	21	Eoin Reddan		(substituted on) 79'
FH	22	Ronan O'Gara
CE	23	Keith Earls		(substituted on) 44'
Coach:
(Ireland) Declan Kidney

Man of the Match:
Brian O'Driscoll (Ireland)

Touch judges:
Jaco Peyper (South Africa)
Pascal Gaüzère (France)
Television match official:
Graham Hughes (England)

Notes:

- Andrew Coombs and Olly Kohn (both Wales) made their international debuts.
- This was the first time that Wales had lost five consecutive matches at home in their history after losing four consecutive matches in the 2012 Autumn internationals and this match.

2 February 2013
16:00 GMT (UTC+0)

England	38–18	Scotland
Try: Ashton 30' c Twelvetrees 42' c Parling 53' m Care 80' c Con: Farrell (3/4) 31', 43', 80'; Pen: Farrell (4/4) 2', 13', 18', 37'	Report	Try: Maitland 9' m Hogg 70' c Con: Laidlaw (1/2) 70'; Pen: Laidlaw (2/2) 19', 39'

Twickenham Stadium, London
Attendance: 81,347
Referee: Alain Rolland (Ireland)

FB	15	Alex Goode	(substituted off) 67'
RW	14	Chris Ashton
OC	13	Brad Barritt
IC	12	Billy Twelvetrees	(substituted off) 67'
LW	11	Mike Brown
FH	10	Owen Farrell
SH	9	Ben Youngs	(substituted off) 57'
N8	8	Ben Morgan	(substituted off) 45'
OF	7	Chris Robshaw (c)
BF	6	Tom Wood
RL	5	Geoff Parling
LL	4	Joe Launchbury	(substituted off) 64'
TP	3	Dan Cole	(substituted off) 73'
HK	2	Tom Youngs	(substituted off) 53'
LP	1	Joe Marler	(substituted off) 57'
Replacements:
HK	16	Dylan Hartley	(substituted on) 53'
PR	17	David Wilson	(substituted on) 73'
PR	18	Mako Vunipola	(substituted on) 57'
LK	19	Courtney Lawes	(substituted on) 64'
FL	20	James Haskell	(substituted on) 45'
SH	21	Danny Care	(substituted on) 57'
FH	22	Toby Flood	(substituted on) 67'
CE	23	David Strettle	(substituted on) 67'
Coach:
(England) Stuart Lancaster

FB	15	Stuart Hogg	(substituted off) 78'
RW	14	Sean Maitland
OC	13	Sean Lamont
IC	12	Matt Scott
LW	11	Tim Visser
FH	10	Ruaridh Jackson
SH	9	Greig Laidlaw	(substituted off) 73'
N8	8	Johnnie Beattie
OF	7	Kelly Brown (c)
BF	6	Alasdair Strokosch	(substituted off) 13'
RL	5	Jim Hamilton	(substituted off) 55'
LL	4	Richie Gray
TP	3	Euan Murray
HK	2	Dougie Hall	(substituted off) 47'
LP	1	Ryan Grant
Replacements:
HK	16	Ross Ford	(substituted on) 47'
PR	17	Moray Low
PR	18	Geoff Cross
LK	19	Alastair Kellock	(substituted on) 55'
FL	20	David Denton	(substituted on) 13'
SH	21	Henry Pyrgos	(substituted on) 73'
FH	22	Duncan Weir
CE	23	Max Evans	(substituted on) 78'
Coach:
(Australia) Scott Johnson

Man of the Match:
Owen Farrell (England)

Touch judges:
Jérôme Garcès (France)
Francisco Pastrana (Argentina)
Television match official:
Nigel Whitehouse (Wales)

Notes:

- Euan Murray (Scotland) earned his 50th cap.
- England retained the Calcutta Cup they won in 2012.
- Scotland's Sean Maitland and England's Billy Twelvetrees each scored a try on their debuts in this game.

3 February 2013
16:00 CET (UTC+1)

Italy	23–18	France
Try: Parisse 4' c Castrogiovanni 56' c Con: Orquera (2/2) 5', 58'; Pen: Orquera (1/1) 17'; Drop: Orquera 14'; Burton 68'	Report	Try: Picamoles 11' m Fall 33' c Con: Michalak (1/2) 33'; Pen: Michalak (2/3) 27', 49'

Stadio Olimpico, Rome
Attendance: 57,547
Referee: Nigel Owens (Wales)

FB	15	Andrea Masi
RW	14	Giovanbattista Venditti
OC	13	Tommaso Benvenuti		(substituted off) 71'
IC	12	Alberto Sgarbi
LW	11	Luke McLean
FH	10	Luciano Orquera		(substituted off) 63'
SH	9	Tobias Botes		(substituted off) 55'
N8	8	Sergio Parisse (c)
OF	7	Simone Favaro		(substituted off) 63'
BF	6	Alessandro Zanni
RL	5	Francesco Minto
LL	4	Quintin Geldenhuys		(substituted off) 71'
TP	3	Martin Castrogiovanni		(substituted off) 62'
HK	2	Leonardo Ghiraldini		(substituted off) 55'	(substituted on) 79'
LP	1	Andrea Lo Cicero		(substituted off) 55'
Replacements:
HK	16	Davide Giazzon	(yellow card) 79'	(substituted on) 55'
PR	17	Alberto de Marchi		(substituted on) 55'
PR	18	Lorenzo Cittadini		(substituted on) 62'
LK	19	Antonio Pavanello		(substituted on) 71'
FL	20	Paul Derbyshire		(substituted on) 63'
SH	21	Edoardo Gori		(substituted on) 55'
FH	22	Kris Burton		(substituted on) 63'	(substituted off) 79'
CE	23	Gonzalo Canale		(substituted on) 71'
Coach:
(France) Jacques Brunel

FB	15	Yoann Huget	(substituted off) 71'
RW	14	Wesley Fofana
OC	13	Florian Fritz	(substituted off) 62'
IC	12	Maxime Mermoz
LW	11	Benjamin Fall
FH	10	Frédéric Michalak
SH	9	Maxime Machenaud	(substituted off) 62'
N8	8	Louis Picamoles	(substituted off) 68'
OF	7	Thierry Dusautoir
BF	6	Fulgence Ouedraogo
RL	5	Yoann Maestri
LL	4	Pascal Papé (c)	(substituted off) 58'
TP	3	Nicolas Mas	(substituted off) 67'
HK	2	Dimitri Szarzewski	(substituted off) 52'
LP	1	Yannick Forestier	(substituted off) 52'
Replacements:
HK	16	Benjamin Kayser	(substituted on) 52'
PR	17	Vincent Debaty	(substituted on) 52'
PR	18	Luc Ducalcon	(substituted on) 66'
LK	19	Romain Taofifénua	(substituted on) 58'
N8	20	Damien Chouly	(substituted on) 68'
SH	21	Morgan Parra	(substituted on) 62'
FH	22	François Trinh-Duc	(substituted on) 71'
CE	23	Mathieu Bastareaud	(substituted on) 62'
Coach:
(France) Philippe Saint-André

Man of the Match:
Luciano Orquera (Italy)

Touch judges:
Wayne Barnes (England)
Leighton Hodges (Wales)
Television match official:
Gareth Simmonds (Wales)

Notes:

- Italy reclaimed the Giuseppe Garibaldi Trophy after losing it in 2012.

=== Round 2 ===
9 February 2013
14:30 GMT (UTC+0)

Scotland	34–10	Italy
Try: Visser 28' c Scott 42' c Hogg 47' c Lamont 68' c Con: Laidlaw (4/4) 30', 44', 48', 69'; Pen: Laidlaw (2/2) 15', 24'	Report	Try: Zanni 73' c Con: Burton (1/1) 74'; Pen: Orquera (1/2) 39'

Murrayfield Stadium, Edinburgh
Attendance: 50,247
Referee: Jaco Peyper (South Africa)

FB	15	Stuart Hogg		(substituted off) 71'
RW	14	Sean Maitland
OC	13	Sean Lamont
IC	12	Matt Scott
LW	11	Tim Visser
FH	10	Ruaridh Jackson
SH	9	Greig Laidlaw		(substituted off) 75'
N8	8	Johnnie Beattie
OF	7	Kelly Brown (c)		(substituted off) 70'
BF	6	Rob Harley
RL	5	Jim Hamilton		(substituted off) 66'
LL	4	Richie Gray
TP	3	Euan Murray		(substituted off) 70'
HK	2	Ross Ford
LP	1	Ryan Grant		(substituted off) 59'
Replacements:
HK	16	Pat MacArthur
PR	17	Moray Low		(substituted on) 59'
PR	18	Geoff Cross	(yellow card) 80'	(substituted on) 70'
LK	19	Alastair Kellock		(substituted on) 66'
FL	20	David Denton		(substituted on) 70'
SH	21	Henry Pyrgos		(substituted on) 75'
FH	22	Duncan Weir
CE	23	Max Evans		(substituted on) 71'
Coach:
(Australia) Scott Johnson

FB	15	Andrea Masi
RW	14	Giovanbattista Venditti
OC	13	Tommaso Benvenuti
IC	12	Gonzalo Canale
LW	11	Luke McLean
FH	10	Luciano Orquera	(substituted off) 47'
SH	9	Tobias Botes	(substituted off) 47'
N8	8	Sergio Parisse (c)
OF	7	Simone Favaro	(substituted off) 67'
BF	6	Alessandro Zanni
RL	5	Francesco Minto
LL	4	Quintin Geldenhuys	(substituted off) 59'
TP	3	Martin Castrogiovanni	(substituted off) 63'
HK	2	Leonardo Ghiraldini	(substituted off) 59'
LP	1	Andrea Lo Cicero	(substituted off) 59'
Replacements:
HK	16	Davide Giazzon	(substituted on) 59'
PR	17	Alberto de Marchi	(substituted on) 59'
PR	18	Lorenzo Cittadini	(substituted on) 63'
LK	19	Antonio Pavanello	(substituted on) 59'
FL	20	Paul Derbyshire	(substituted on) 67'
SH	21	Edoardo Gori	(substituted on) 47'
FH	22	Kris Burton	(substituted on) 47'
CE	23	Gonzalo Garcia
Coach:
(France) Jacques Brunel

Man of the Match:
Greig Laidlaw (Scotland)

Touch judges:
John Lacey (Ireland)
Leighton Hodges (Wales)
Television match official:
Marshall Kilgore (Ireland)

Notes:

- Leonardo Ghiraldini (Italy) earned his 50th cap.
- Scotland's first Six Nations win since their 21–8 win over Italy in the 2011 Six Nations Championship.
- This was Scotland's first home win since their 23–12 win over Italy in their 2011 Rugby World Cup warm-up test match.

9 February 2013
18:00 CET (UTC+1)

France	6–16	Wales
Pen: Michalak (2/2) 14', 52'	Report	Try: North 71' c Con: Halfpenny (1/1) 73'; Pen: Halfpenny (3/3) 17', 42', 74'

Stade de France, Saint-Denis
Attendance: 80,000
Referee: George Clancy (Ireland)

FB	15	Yoann Huget
RW	14	Wesley Fofana
OC	13	Mathieu Bastareaud
IC	12	Maxime Mermoz	(substituted off) 75'
LW	11	Benjamin Fall	(substituted off) 40'
FH	10	Frédéric Michalak
SH	9	Maxime Machenaud	(substituted off) 55'
N8	8	Louis Picamoles
OF	7	Thierry Dusautoir (c)
BF	6	Fulgence Ouedraogo	(substituted off) 51'
RL	5	Yoann Maestri
LL	4	Jocelino Suta	(substituted off) 65'
TP	3	Nicolas Mas	(substituted off) 55'
HK	2	Dimitri Szarzewski	(substituted off) 50'
LP	1	Yannick Forestier	(substituted off) 50'
Replacements:
HK	16	Benjamin Kayser	(substituted on) 50'
PR	17	Vincent Debaty	(substituted on) 50'
PR	18	Luc Ducalcon	(substituted on) 55'
LK	19	Romain Taofifénua	(substituted on) 65'
N8	20	Damien Chouly	(substituted on) 51'
SH	21	Morgan Parra	(substituted on) 55'
FH	22	François Trinh-Duc	(substituted on) 40'
CE	23	Florian Fritz	(substituted on) 75'
Coach:
(France) Philippe Saint-André

FB	15	Leigh Halfpenny
RW	14	Alex Cuthbert
OC	13	Jonathan Davies
IC	12	Jamie Roberts	(substituted off) 78'
LW	11	George North
FH	10	Dan Biggar
SH	9	Mike Phillips	(substituted off) 70'
N8	8	Taulupe Faletau
OF	7	Justin Tipuric
BF	6	Ryan Jones (c)	(substituted off) 78'
RL	5	Ian Evans	(substituted off) 78'
LL	4	Andrew Coombs
TP	3	Adam Jones	(substituted off) 78'
HK	2	Richard Hibbard	(substituted off) 58'
LP	1	Gethin Jenkins	38' to 40'		(substituted off) 58'
Replacements:
HK	16	Ken Owens	(substituted on) 55'
PR	17	Paul James	(substituted on) 38'	(substituted off) 40'	(substituted on) 58'
PR	18	Craig Mitchell	(substituted on) 78'
LK	19	Lou Reed	(substituted on) 78'
FL	20	Aaron Shingler	(substituted on) 78'
SH	21	Lloyd Williams	(substituted on) 70'
FH	22	James Hook
CE	23	Scott Williams	(substituted on) 78'
Coach:
(Wales) Rob Howley

Man of the Match:
Leigh Halfpenny (Wales)

Touch judges:
Alain Rolland (Ireland)
Francisco Pastrana (Argentina)
Television match official:
Giulio De Santis (Italy)

Notes:

- Jamie Roberts (Wales) earned his 50th cap.
- This was Wales' first win since their 16–9 Grand Slam victory over France in the 2012 Six Nations Championship.
- Wales' first back to back win over France since 1999 and the first time they have won in France since their Grand Slam triumph in 2005 .
- This was the first time that France had lost their opening two matches in the Six Nations Championship since the competition became the Six Nations in 2000. The last time they lost their first two games was in 1982.

10 February 2013
15:00 GMT (UTC+0)

Ireland	6–12	England
Pen: O'Gara (2/3) 44', 57'	Report	Pen: Farrell (4/6) 2', 28', 63', 65'

Aviva Stadium, Dublin
Attendance: 51,000
Referee: Jérôme Garcès (France)

FB	15	Rob Kearney
RW	14	Craig Gilroy
OC	13	Brian O'Driscoll
IC	12	Gordon D'Arcy
LW	11	Simon Zebo	(substituted off) 10'
FH	10	Johnny Sexton	(substituted off) 31'
SH	9	Conor Murray
N8	8	Jamie Heaslip (c)
OF	7	Seán O'Brien	(substituted off) 65'
BF	6	Peter O'Mahony
RL	5	Donnacha Ryan	(substituted off) 65'
LL	4	Mike McCarthy
TP	3	Mike Ross	(substituted off) 78'
HK	2	Rory Best	(substituted off) 74'
LP	1	Cian Healy	(substituted off) 74'
Replacements:
HK	16	Seán Cronin	(substituted on) 74'
PR	17	Dave Kilcoyne	(substituted on) 74'
PR	18	Declan Fitzpatrick	(substituted on) 78'
LK	19	Donncha O'Callaghan	(substituted on) 65'
FL	20	Chris Henry	(substituted on) 65'
SH	21	Eoin Reddan
FH	22	Ronan O'Gara	(substituted on) 31'
CE	23	Keith Earls	(substituted on) 10'
Coach:
(Ireland) Declan Kidney

FB	15	Alex Goode
RW	14	Chris Ashton
OC	13	Brad Barritt
IC	12	Billy Twelvetrees	(substituted off) 47'
LW	11	Mike Brown
FH	10	Owen Farrell
SH	9	Ben Youngs
N8	8	Tom Wood
OF	7	Chris Robshaw (c)
BF	6	James Haskell
RL	5	Geoff Parling
LL	4	Joe Launchbury	(substituted off) 47'
TP	3	Dan Cole	(substituted off) 76'
HK	2	Tom Youngs	(substituted off) 50'
LP	1	Joe Marler	(substituted off) 58'
Replacements:
HK	16	Dylan Hartley	(substituted on) 50'
PR	17	David Wilson	(substituted on) 76'
PR	18	Mako Vunipola	(substituted on) 58'
LK	19	Courtney Lawes	(substituted on) 47'	(substituted off) 70'
N8	20	Thomas Waldrom		(substituted on) 70'
SH	21	Danny Care
FH	22	Toby Flood
CE	23	Manu Tuilagi	(substituted on) 47'
Coach:
(England) Stuart Lancaster

Man of the Match:
Chris Robshaw (England)

Touch judges:
Nigel Owens (Wales)
Pascal Gaüzère (France)
Television match official:
Iain Ramage (Scotland)

Notes:

- This was the lowest scoring match since the competition became the Six Nations in 2000.
- This win was England's first Six Nations victory in Ireland since their Grand Slam triumph in 2003.
- England retained the Millennium Trophy they won in 2012.

=== Round 3 ===
23 February 2013
15:30 CET (UTC+1)

Italy	9–26	Wales
Pen: Burton (3/3) 9', 29', 49'	Report	Try: Davies 44' c Cuthbert 61' c Con: Halfpenny (2/2) 45', 61'; Pen: Halfpenny (4/5) 7', 15', 19', 52'

Stadio Olimpico, Rome
Attendance: 73,526
Referee: Romain Poite (France)

FB	15	Andrea Masi
RW	14	Giovanbattista Venditti
OC	13	Tommaso Benvenuti
IC	12	Gonzalo Canale		(substituted off) 63'
LW	11	Luke McLean
FH	10	Kris Burton
SH	9	Edoardo Gori		(substituted off) 65'
N8	8	Manoa Vosawai		(substituted off) 65'	(substituted on) 68'
OF	7	Simone Favaro		(substituted off) 69'
BF	6	Alessandro Zanni
RL	5	Francesco Minto		(substituted off) 54'
LL	4	Antonio Pavanello
TP	3	Martin Castrogiovanni (c)	(yellow card) 58'			(substituted off) 70'
HK	2	Leonardo Ghiraldini		(substituted off) 54'
LP	1	Andrea Lo Cicero		(substituted off) 54'
Replacements:
HK	16	Davide Giazzon		(substituted on) 54'
PR	17	Alberto de Marchi		(substituted on) 54'
PR	18	Lorenzo Cittadini		(substituted on) 65'	(substituted off) 68'	(substituted on) 70'
LK	19	Quintin Geldenhuys		(substituted on) 54'
FL	20	Paul Derbyshire		(substituted on) 69'
SH	21	Tobias Botes		(substituted on) 65'
FH	22	Luciano Orquera
CE	23	Gonzalo Garcia		(substituted on) 63'
Coach:
(France) Jacques Brunel

FB	15	Leigh Halfpenny
RW	14	Alex Cuthbert
OC	13	Jonathan Davies
IC	12	Jamie Roberts	(substituted off) 70'
LW	11	George North
FH	10	Dan Biggar	(substituted off) 68'
SH	9	Mike Phillips	(substituted off) 63'
N8	8	Taulupe Faletau
OF	7	Justin Tipuric
BF	6	Ryan Jones (c)	(substituted off) 68'
RL	5	Ian Evans
LL	4	Andrew Coombs	(substituted off) 51'
TP	3	Adam Jones	(substituted off) 73'
HK	2	Richard Hibbard	(substituted off) 51'
LP	1	Gethin Jenkins	(substituted off) 45'
Replacements:
HK	16	Ken Owens	(substituted on) 51'
PR	17	Paul James	(substituted on) 45'
PR	18	Craig Mitchell	(substituted on) 73'
LK	19	Alun Wyn Jones	(substituted on) 51'
FL	20	Sam Warburton	(substituted on) 68'
SH	21	Lloyd Williams	(substituted on) 63'
FH	22	James Hook	(substituted on) 68'
CE	23	Scott Williams	(substituted on) 70'
Coach:
(Wales) Rob Howley

Man of the Match:
Leigh Halfpenny (Wales)

Touch judges:
Alain Rolland (Ireland)
Pascal Gaüzère (France)
Television match official:
Geoff Warren (England)

23 February 2013
17:00 GMT (UTC+0)

England	23–13	France
Try: Tuilagi 54' m Pen: Farrell (4/5) 1', 27', 33', 47'; Flood (2/2) 72', 76'	Report	Try: Fofana 29' c Con: Parra (1/1) 31'; Pen: Parra (1/3) 4'; Michalak (1/1) 56'

Twickenham Stadium, London
Attendance: 82,000
Referee: Craig Joubert (South Africa)

FB	15	Alex Goode
RW	14	Chris Ashton
OC	13	Manu Tuilagi
IC	12	Brad Barritt
LW	11	Mike Brown
FH	10	Owen Farrell		(substituted off) 61'
SH	9	Ben Youngs		(substituted off) 58'
N8	8	Tom Wood
OF	7	Chris Robshaw (c)
BF	6	Courtney Lawes		(substituted off) 51'
RL	5	Geoff Parling
LL	4	Joe Launchbury
TP	3	Dan Cole	(yellow card) 79'
HK	2	Dylan Hartley		(substituted off) 51'
LP	1	Joe Marler		(substituted off) 51'
Replacements:
HK	16	Tom Youngs		(substituted on) 51'
PR	17	Dave Wilson
PR	18	Mako Vunipola		(substituted on) 51'
FL	19	James Haskell		(substituted on) 51'
N8	20	Thomas Waldrom
SH	21	Danny Care		(substituted on) 58'
FH	22	Toby Flood		(substituted on) 61'
CE	23	Billy Twelvetrees
Coach:
(England) Stuart Lancaster

FB	15	Yoann Huget
RW	14	Vincent Clerc
OC	13	Mathieu Bastareaud	(substituted off) 73'
IC	12	Wesley Fofana
LW	11	Benjamin Fall
FH	10	François Trinh-Duc	(substituted off) 52'
SH	9	Morgan Parra	(substituted off) 64'
N8	8	Louis Picamoles
OF	7	Thierry Dusautoir (c)
BF	6	Yannick Nyanga	(substituted off) 68'
RL	5	Yoann Maestri
LL	4	Christophe Samson	(substituted off) 64'
TP	3	Nicolas Mas	(substituted off) 64'
HK	2	Benjamin Kayser	(substituted off) 55'
LP	1	Thomas Domingo	(substituted off) 55'
Replacements:
HK	16	Dimitri Szarzewski	(substituted on) 55'
PR	17	Vincent Debaty	(substituted on) 55'
PR	18	Luc Ducalcon	(substituted on) 64'
LK	19	Jocelino Suta	(substituted on) 64'
FL	20	Antonie Claassen	(substituted on) 68'
SH	21	Maxime Machenaud	(substituted on) 66'
FH	22	Frédéric Michalak	(substituted on) 52'
CE	23	Florian Fritz	(substituted on) 73'
Coach:
(France) Philippe Saint-André

Man of the Match:
Chris Robshaw (England)

Touch judges:
John Lacey (Ireland)
Leighton Hodges (Wales)
Television match official:
Jim Yuille (Scotland)

24 February 2013
14:00 GMT (UTC+0)

Scotland	12–8	Ireland
Pen: Laidlaw (4/4) 52', 59', 63', 73'	Report	Try: Gilroy 43' m Pen: Jackson (1/3) 35'

Murrayfield Stadium, Edinburgh
Attendance: 67,006
Referee: Wayne Barnes (England)

FB	15	Stuart Hogg
RW	14	Sean Maitland
OC	13	Sean Lamont
IC	12	Matt Scott
LW	11	Tim Visser
FH	10	Ruaridh Jackson		(substituted off) 59'
SH	9	Greig Laidlaw
N8	8	Johnnie Beattie				(substituted off) 71'
OF	7	Kelly Brown (c)		45' to 50'
BF	6	Rob Harley		(substituted off) 18'	(substituted on) 25'
RL	5	Jim Hamilton		(substituted off) 71'
LL	4	Richie Gray
TP	3	Geoff Cross				(substituted off) 75'
HK	2	Ross Ford		(substituted off) 45'
LP	1	Ryan Grant	(yellow card) 15'
Replacements:
HK	16	Dougie Hall		(substituted on) 45'
PR	17	Moray Low		(substituted on) 18'	(substituted off) 25'	(substituted on) 75'
PR	18	Jon Welsh
LK	19	Alastair Kellock		(substituted on) 71'
FL	20	David Denton		(substituted on) 45'	(substituted off) 50'	(substituted on) 71'
SH	21	Henry Pyrgos
FH	22	Duncan Weir		(substituted on) 59'
CE	23	Max Evans
Coach:
(Australia) Scott Johnson

FB	15	Rob Kearney
RW	14	Craig Gilroy	(substituted off) 59'
OC	13	Brian O'Driscoll
IC	12	Luke Marshall
LW	11	Keith Earls
FH	10	Paddy Jackson	(substituted off) 64'
SH	9	Conor Murray	(substituted off) 69'
N8	8	Jamie Heaslip (c)
OF	7	Seán O'Brien
BF	6	Peter O'Mahony	(substituted off) 71'
RL	5	Donnacha Ryan
LL	4	Donncha O'Callaghan	(substituted off) 71'
TP	3	Mike Ross
HK	2	Rory Best
LP	1	Tom Court	(substituted off) 55'
Replacements:
HK	16	Seán Cronin
PR	17	Dave Kilcoyne	(substituted on) 55'
PR	18	Declan Fitzpatrick
LK	19	Devin Toner	(substituted on) 71'
FL	20	Iain Henderson	(substituted on) 71'
SH	21	Eoin Reddan	(substituted on) 69'
FH	22	Ronan O'Gara	(substituted on) 64'
WG	23	Luke Fitzgerald	(substituted on) 59'
Coach:
(Ireland) Declan Kidney

Man of the Match:
Jim Hamilton (Scotland)

Touch judges:
Jérôme Garcès (France)
Greg Garner (England)
Television match official:
Eric Gauzins (France)

Notes:

- Alastair Kellock (Scotland) earned his 50th cap.
- Paddy Jackson (Ireland) made his international debut.
- This was the first time Scotland had won consecutive matches within the tournament since 2001 after beating Italy then Ireland.
- Scotland won the Centenary Quaich which they last won in 2010.

=== Round 4 ===
9 March 2013
14:30 GMT (UTC+0)

Scotland	18–28	Wales
Pen: Laidlaw (6/8) 6', 12', 26', 37', 48', 60'	Report	Try: Hibbard 23' c Con: Halfpenny (1/1) 23'; Pen: Halfpenny (7/10) 4', 40', 46', 55', 58', 67', 71'

Murrayfield Stadium, Edinburgh
Attendance: 67,144
Referee: Craig Joubert (South Africa)

FB	15	Stuart Hogg
RW	14	Sean Maitland
OC	13	Sean Lamont
IC	12	Matt Scott
LW	11	Tim Visser
FH	10	Duncan Weir	(substituted off) 78'
SH	9	Greig Laidlaw
N8	8	Johnnie Beattie	(substituted off) 68'
OF	7	Kelly Brown (c)
BF	6	Rob Harley
RL	5	Jim Hamilton
LL	4	Richie Gray	(substituted off) 29'
TP	3	Euan Murray	(substituted off) 76'
HK	2	Ross Ford
LP	1	Ryan Grant
Replacements:
HK	16	Dougie Hall
PR	17	Moray Low
PR	18	Geoff Cross	(substituted on) 76'
LK	19	Alastair Kellock	(substituted on) 29'
N8	20	Ryan Wilson	(substituted on) 68'
SH	21	Henry Pyrgos
FH	22	Ruaridh Jackson	(substituted on) 78'
CE	23	Max Evans
Coach:
(Australia) Scott Johnson

FB	15	Leigh Halfpenny
RW	14	Alex Cuthbert
OC	13	Jonathan Davies
IC	12	Jamie Roberts		(substituted off) 72'
LW	11	George North
FH	10	Dan Biggar
SH	9	Mike Phillips		(substituted off) 72'
N8	8	Taulupe Faletau		(substituted off) 80+1'
OF	7	Sam Warburton
BF	6	Ryan Jones (c)		(substituted off) 48'
RL	5	Ian Evans
LL	4	Alun Wyn Jones
TP	3	Adam Jones
HK	2	Richard Hibbard		(substituted off) 60'
LP	1	Paul James	(yellow card) 77'
Replacements:
HK	16	Ken Owens		(substituted on) 60'
PR	17	Ryan Bevington		(substituted on) 80+1'
PR	18	Scott Andrews
LK	19	Andrew Coombs
FL	20	Justin Tipuric		(substituted on) 48'
SH	21	Lloyd Williams		(substituted on) 72'
FH	22	James Hook
CE	23	Scott Williams		(substituted on) 72'
Coach:
(Wales) Rob Howley

Man of the Match:
Sam Warburton (Wales)

Touch judges:
Glen Jackson (New Zealand)
Lourens van der Merwe (South Africa)
Television match official:
Giulio De Santis (Italy)

Notes:

- Ryan Wilson (Scotland) made his international debut.
- 18 penalties were attempted in this match, a record for an international match.
- This was Wales' fifth consecutive away victory in the Six Nations, a national and tournament record.

9 March 2013
17:00 GMT (UTC+0)

Ireland	13–13	France
Try: Heaslip 10' c Con: Jackson (1/1) 11'; Pen: Jackson (2/4) 29', 32'	Report	Try: Picamoles 73' c Con: Michalak (1/1) 74'; Pen: Michalak (1/3) 26'; Parra (1/2) 53'

Aviva Stadium, Dublin
Attendance: 51,000
Referee: Steve Walsh (Australia)

FB	15	Rob Kearney
RW	14	Fergus McFadden	(substituted off) 62'
OC	13	Brian O'Driscoll		(substituted off) 71'	(substituted on) 75'
IC	12	Luke Marshall	(substituted off) 71'
LW	11	Keith Earls
FH	10	Paddy Jackson
SH	9	Conor Murray	(substituted off) 62'	(substituted on) 71'	(substituted off) 75'
N8	8	Jamie Heaslip (c)
OF	7	Seán O'Brien
BF	6	Peter O'Mahony	(substituted off) 76'
RL	5	Donnacha Ryan	(substituted off) 67'
LL	4	Mike McCarthy
TP	3	Mike Ross
HK	2	Rory Best
LP	1	Cian Healy
Replacements:
HK	16	Seán Cronin		(substituted on) 80'
PR	17	Dave Kilcoyne
PR	18	Stephen Archer
LK	19	Donncha O'Callaghan	(substituted on) 67'
FL	20	Iain Henderson	(substituted on) 76'
SH	21	Eoin Reddan	(substituted on) 62'	(substituted off) 80'
FH	22	Ian Madigan	(substituted on) 71'
WG	23	Luke Fitzgerald	(substituted on) 62'
Coach:
(Ireland) Declan Kidney

FB	15	Yoann Huget
RW	14	Vincent Clerc
OC	13	Florian Fritz	51' to 57'		(substituted off) 67'
IC	12	Wesley Fofana
LW	11	Maxime Médard
FH	10	Frédéric Michalak
SH	9	Morgan Parra
N8	8	Louis Picamoles
OF	7	Thierry Dusautoir (c)
BF	6	Yannick Nyanga	(substituted off) 65'
RL	5	Yoann Maestri	(substituted off) 50'
LL	4	Christophe Samson
TP	3	Nicolas Mas
HK	2	Benjamin Kayser	(substituted off) 67'
LP	1	Thomas Domingo	(substituted off) 65'
Replacements:
HK	16	Guilhem Guirado	(substituted on) 67'
PR	17	Vincent Debaty	(substituted on) 65'
PR	18	Luc Ducalcon
LK	19	Sebastien Vahaamahina	(substituted on) 50'
FL	20	Antonie Claassen	(substituted on) 65'
SH	21	Maxime Machenaud
FH	22	François Trinh-Duc
CE	23	Mathieu Bastareaud	(substituted on) 51'	(substituted off) 57'	(substituted on) 67'
Coach:
(France) Philippe Saint-André

Man of the Match:
Conor Murray (Ireland)

Touch judges:
Wayne Barnes (England)
Greg Garner (England)
Television match official:
Nigel Whitehouse (Wales)

Notes:

- Eoin Reddan (Ireland) and Morgan Parra (France) earned their 50th caps.
- Ian Madigan (Ireland) made his international debut.
- This is the first time France and Ireland have drawn two consecutive matches against each other, the first time this has happened since England and France drew three consecutive matches in 1959, 1960 and 1961.

10 March 2013
15:00 GMT (UTC+0)

England	18–11	Italy
Pen: Flood (6/6) 3', 15', 37', 40', 43', 61'	Report	Try: McLean 48' m Pen: Orquera (2/3) 17', 47'

Twickenham Stadium, London
Attendance: 81,458
Referee: George Clancy (Ireland)

FB	15	Alex Goode
RW	14	Chris Ashton
OC	13	Manu Tuilagi
IC	12	Brad Barritt	(substituted off) 66'
LW	11	Mike Brown
FH	10	Toby Flood
SH	9	Danny Care	(substituted off) 57'
N8	8	Tom Wood
OF	7	Chris Robshaw (c)
BF	6	James Haskell	(substituted off) 50'
RL	5	Geoff Parling	(substituted off) 45'
LL	4	Joe Launchbury
TP	3	Dan Cole	(substituted off) 75'
HK	2	Tom Youngs	(substituted off) 71'
LP	1	Mako Vunipola	(substituted off) 57'
Replacements:
HK	16	Dylan Hartley	(substituted on) 71'
PR	17	David Wilson	(substituted on) 75'
PR	18	Joe Marler	(substituted on) 57'
LK	19	Courtney Lawes	(substituted on) 45'
FL	20	Tom Croft	(substituted on) 50'
SH	21	Ben Youngs	(substituted on) 57'
FH	22	Freddie Burns
CE	23	Billy Twelvetrees	(substituted on) 66'
Coach:
(England) Stuart Lancaster

FB	15	Andrea Masi		34' to 40'
RW	14	Giovanbattista Venditti
OC	13	Gonzalo Canale
IC	12	Gonzalo Garcia
LW	11	Luke McLean		(substituted off) 71'
FH	10	Luciano Orquera
SH	9	Edoardo Gori	(yellow card) 30'			(substituted off) 57'
N8	8	Sergio Parisse (c)
OF	7	Robert Barbieri		(substituted off) 62'
BF	6	Alessandro Zanni
RL	5	Joshua Furno		(substituted off) 62'
LL	4	Quintin Geldenhuys		(substituted off) 62'
TP	3	Martin Castrogiovanni		(substituted off) 28'
HK	2	Leonardo Ghiraldini		(substituted off) 58'
LP	1	Alberto de Marchi		(substituted off) 75'
Replacements:
HK	16	Davide Giazzon		(substituted on) 58'
PR	17	Andrea Lo Cicero		(substituted on) 75'
PR	18	Lorenzo Cittadini		(substituted on) 28'
LK	19	Antonio Pavanello		(substituted on) 62'
LK	20	Francesco Minto		(substituted on) 62'
FL	21	Simone Favaro		(substituted on) 62'
SH	22	Tobias Botes		(substituted on) 34'	(substituted off) 40'	(substituted on) 57'
CE	23	Tommaso Benvenuti		(substituted on) 71'
Coach:
(France) Jacques Brunel

Man of the Match:
Andrea Masi (Italy)

Touch judges:
Nigel Owens (Wales)
Mathieu Raynal (France)
Television match official:
Simon McDowell (Ireland)

Notes

- Closest winning margin between the sides in England.

=== Round 5 ===
16 March 2013
15:30 CET (UTC+1)

Italy	22–15	Ireland
Try: Venditti 48' c Con: Orquera (1/1) 49'; Pen: Orquera (4/5) 13', 21', 69', 80'; Garcia (1/2) 35'	Report	Pen: Jackson (5/6) 5', 40', 52', 57', 63'

Stadio Olimpico, Rome
Attendance: 74,174
Referee: Wayne Barnes (England)

FB	15	Andrea Masi		(substituted off) 65'
RW	14	Giovanbattista Venditti
OC	13	Gonzalo Canale
IC	12	Gonzalo Garcia
LW	11	Luke McLean
FH	10	Luciano Orquera
SH	9	Edoardo Gori		(substituted off) 74'
N8	8	Sergio Parisse (c)	(yellow card) 51'
OF	7	Simone Favaro		(substituted off) 57'
BF	6	Alessandro Zanni
RL	5	Joshua Furno		(substituted off) 57'
LL	4	Quintin Geldenhuys		(substituted off) 64'
TP	3	Lorenzo Cittadini		(substituted off) 74'
HK	2	Leonardo Ghiraldini		(substituted off) 74'
LP	1	Andrea Lo Cicero		(substituted off) 64'
Replacements:
HK	16	Davide Giazzon		(substituted on) 74'
PR	17	Michele Rizzo		(substituted on) 64'
PR	18	Alberto de Marchi		(substituted on) 74'
LK	19	Antonio Pavanello		(substituted on) 64'
LK	20	Francesco Minto		(substituted on) 57'
FL	21	Paul Derbyshire		(substituted on) 57'
SH	22	Tobias Botes		(substituted on) 74'
CE	23	Tommaso Benvenuti		(substituted on) 65'
Coach:
(France) Jacques Brunel

FB	15	Rob Kearney
RW	14	Craig Gilroy
OC	13	Brian O'Driscoll	(yellow card) 29'
IC	12	Luke Marshall		(substituted off) 27'
LW	11	Keith Earls		(substituted off) 24'
FH	10	Paddy Jackson
SH	9	Conor Murray	(yellow card) 79'
N8	8	Jamie Heaslip (c)
OF	7	Seán O'Brien
BF	6	Peter O'Mahony
RL	5	Donnacha Ryan	(yellow card) 68'	(substituted off) 79'
LL	4	Mike McCarthy		(substituted off) 64'
TP	3	Mike Ross		(substituted off) 66'
HK	2	Rory Best		(substituted off) 69'
LP	1	Cian Healy		(substituted off) 69'
Replacements:
HK	16	Seán Cronin		(substituted on) 69'
PR	17	Dave Kilcoyne		(substituted on) 69'
PR	18	Stephen Archer		(substituted on) 66'
LK	19	Devin Toner		(substituted on) 64'
FL	20	Iain Henderson			(substituted on) 36'
SH	21	Paul Marshall		(substituted on) 79'
FH	22	Ian Madigan		(substituted on) 27'
WG	23	Luke Fitzgerald		(substituted on) 24'	(substituted off) 36'
Coach:
(Ireland) Declan Kidney

Man of the Match:
Alessandro Zanni (Italy)

Touch judges:
Romain Poite (France)
Glen Jackson (New Zealand)
Television match official:
Jim Yuille (Scotland)

Notes:

- This is Italy's first double win in the Six Nations since 2007.
- First Italian win against Ireland in the Six Nations and since 1997.
- With this defeat, Ireland dropped to 9th in the IRB World Rankings, their lowest position since the rankings began.

16 March 2013
17:00 GMT (UTC+0)

Wales	30–3	England
Try: Cuthbert (2) 56' m, 65' c Con: Biggar (1/1) 66'; Pen: Halfpenny (4/4) 10', 17', 23', 51'; Biggar (1/1) 70'; Drop: Biggar 64'	Report	Pen: Farrell (1/3) 20'

Millennium Stadium, Cardiff
Attendance: 74,104
Referee: Steve Walsh (Australia)

FB	15	Leigh Halfpenny
RW	14	Alex Cuthbert
OC	13	Jonathan Davies
IC	12	Jamie Roberts	(substituted off) 75'
LW	11	George North
FH	10	Dan Biggar	(substituted off) 75'
SH	9	Mike Phillips	(substituted off) 75'
N8	8	Taulupe Faletau
OF	7	Justin Tipuric
BF	6	Sam Warburton	(substituted off) 75'
RL	5	Ian Evans	(substituted off) 70'
LL	4	Alun Wyn Jones
TP	3	Adam Jones	(substituted off) 73'
HK	2	Richard Hibbard	(substituted off) 52'
LP	1	Gethin Jenkins (c)	(substituted off) 61'
Replacements:
HK	16	Ken Owens	(substituted on) 52'
PR	17	Paul James	(substituted on) 61'
PR	18	Scott Andrews	(substituted on) 73'
LK	19	Andrew Coombs	(substituted on) 70'
FL	20	Aaron Shingler	(substituted on) 75'
SH	21	Lloyd Williams	(substituted on) 75'
FH	22	James Hook	(substituted on) 75'
CE	23	Scott Williams	(substituted on) 75'
Coach:
(Wales) Rob Howley

FB	15	Alex Goode	(substituted off) 64'
RW	14	Chris Ashton
OC	13	Manu Tuilagi
IC	12	Brad Barritt
LW	11	Mike Brown
FH	10	Owen Farrell	(substituted off) 67'
SH	9	Ben Youngs	(substituted off) 64'
N8	8	Tom Wood	(substituted off) 67'
OF	7	Chris Robshaw (c)
BF	6	Tom Croft
RL	5	Geoff Parling
LL	4	Joe Launchbury	(substituted off) 52'
TP	3	Dan Cole	(substituted off) 72'
HK	2	Tom Youngs	(substituted off) 52'
LP	1	Joe Marler	(substituted off) 44'
Replacements:
HK	16	Dylan Hartley	(substituted on) 52'
PR	17	David Wilson	(substituted on) 72'
PR	18	Mako Vunipola	(substituted on) 44'
LK	19	Courtney Lawes	(substituted on) 52'
FL	20	James Haskell	(substituted on) 67'
SH	21	Danny Care	(substituted on) 64'
FH	22	Toby Flood	(substituted on) 67'
CE	23	Billy Twelvetrees	(substituted on) 64'
Coach:
(England) Stuart Lancaster

Man of the Match:
Justin Tipuric (Wales)

Touch judges:
Craig Joubert (South Africa)
John Lacey (Ireland)
Television match official:
Marshall Kilgore (Ireland)

Notes:

- James Haskell (England) earned his 50th cap.
- This was Wales' biggest ever win over England.
- This was Wales' first back-to-back titles since they won the Five Nations Championship in 1978 and 1979.

16 March 2013
21:00 CET (UTC+1)

France	23–16	Scotland
Try: Fofana 65' c Médard 70' c Con: Michalak (1/1) 66'; Machenaud (1/1) 71'; Pen: Michalak (3/3) 44', 49', 53'	Report	Try: Visser 75' c Con: Jackson (1/1) 75'; Pen: Laidlaw (3/3) 8', 14', 58'

Stade de France, Saint-Denis
Attendance: 81,158
Referee: Nigel Owens (Wales)

FB	15	Yoann Huget
RW	14	Vincent Clerc
OC	13	Mathieu Bastareaud	(substituted off) 74'
IC	12	Wesley Fofana
LW	11	Maxime Médard
FH	10	Frédéric Michalak	(substituted off) 70'
SH	9	Morgan Parra	(substituted off) 40'
N8	8	Louis Picamoles
OF	7	Thierry Dusautoir (c)	63' to 67'
BF	6	Antonie Claassen			(substituted off) 68'
RL	5	Yoann Maestri
LL	4	Sebastien Vahaamahina	(substituted off) 70'
TP	3	Nicolas Mas	(substituted off) 63'
HK	2	Benjamin Kayser	(substituted off) 54'
LP	1	Thomas Domingo	(substituted off) 54'
Replacements:
HK	16	Guilhem Guirado	(substituted on) 54'
PR	17	Vincent Debaty	(substituted on) 54'
PR	18	Luc Ducalcon	(substituted on) 63'
LK	19	Christophe Samson	(substituted on) 70'
FL	20	Yannick Nyanga	(substituted on) 63'	(substituted off) 67'	(substituted on) 68'
SH	21	Maxime Machenaud	(substituted on) 40'
FH	22	François Trinh-Duc	(substituted on) 70'
CE	23	Gaël Fickou	(substituted on) 74'
Coach:
(France) Philippe Saint-André

FB	15	Stuart Hogg
RW	14	Sean Maitland	(substituted off) 30'
OC	13	Sean Lamont
IC	12	Matt Scott
LW	11	Tim Visser
FH	10	Duncan Weir	(substituted off) 67'
SH	9	Greig Laidlaw	(substituted off) 74'
N8	8	Johnnie Beattie	(substituted off) 70'
OF	7	Kelly Brown (c)
BF	6	Alasdair Strokosch
RL	5	Jim Hamilton
LL	4	Grant Gilchrist	(substituted off) 53'
TP	3	Euan Murray	(substituted off) 64'
HK	2	Ross Ford	(substituted off) 74'
LP	1	Ryan Grant	(substituted off) 63'
Replacements:
HK	16	Dougie Hall	(substituted on) 74'
PR	17	Moray Low	(substituted on) 63'
PR	18	Geoff Cross	(substituted on) 64'
LK	19	Alastair Kellock	(substituted on) 53'
N8	20	Ryan Wilson	(substituted on) 70'
SH	21	Henry Pyrgos	(substituted on) 74'
FH	22	Ruaridh Jackson	(substituted on) 67'
CE	23	Max Evans	(substituted on) 30'
Coach:
(Australia) Scott Johnson

Man of the Match:
Wesley Fofana (France)

Touch judges:
George Clancy (Ireland)
Lourens van der Merwe (South Africa)
Television match official:
Carlo Damasco (Italy)

- Gaël Fickou (France) and Grant Gilchrist (Scotland) made their international debuts.
- Despite winning this match, France finished last in the table for the first time since 1999, and was awarded the wooden spoon as a result.

== Statistics ==
=== Points scorers ===
Pos	Name	Team	Pts
1	Leigh Halfpenny	Wales	74
2	Greig Laidlaw	Scotland	61
3	Owen Farrell	England	45
4	Frédéric Michalak	France	33
4	Luciano Orquera	Italy	33
6	Paddy Jackson	Ireland	26
7	Toby Flood	England	24
8	Alex Cuthbert	Wales	20
9	Johnny Sexton	Ireland	15
10	Kris Burton	Italy	14

=== Try scorers ===
Pos	Name	Team	Tries
1	Alex Cuthbert	Wales	4
2	Wesley Fofana	France	2
2	Stuart Hogg	Scotland	2
2	Louis Picamoles	France	2
2	Tim Visser	Scotland	2
6	25 players		1

== Media coverage ==
In the United Kingdom, BBC One televised the all matches live apart from the round five match between France and Scotland which was televised live on both BBC HD and BBC Two. There was also a forum show on the BBC Red Button for satellite, cable and Freeview viewers after several matches. Four days after the conclusion of the tournament, there was a highlights programme called “Wales v England: We Did It!” shown at 10:50pm on BBC One in Wales.

In Wales, Wales matches were televised live in Welsh by S4C.

Elsewhere, the tournament's matches were televised live by RTÉ in Ireland, France Télévisions in France, Sky Italia in Italy, ESPN in Australia, New Zealand, Pacific Islands and Japan, SuperSport in South Africa, ESPN+ in Latin America, ESPN Brasil in Brazil, Setanta Sports Asia in Southeast Asia, Dolce Sport in Romania, Nova Sports in Greece, Sport TV in Portugal, Sport 1 in eastern Europe as well as Channel 9, Arena Sport TV and Canal+.

In the United States, BBC America televised one match from each week live while Universal Sports televised all the matches in delay as did Sportsnet World in Canada.
