= 2012–13 Harlequins season =

Rugby union team season

The 2012–13 Harlequins season ended with the Harlequins reaching the playoffs in the English Premiership and the knockout rounds of the Heineken Cup. They won their first ever English titles,

== English Premiership ==
Following their 2011–2012 form, Harlequins started their 2012–2013 season on a high with four straight wins before suffering a first setback at the hands of Saracens at home in round 5 (16–18) and at Exeter Chiefs in round 6 (42–28). The club then managed to stay within the first two places of the table. On 29 December Big Game 5 proved to be a success with a 26–15 win over London Irish before a capacity crowd (82,000) at Twickenham Stadium. Later in the season the second setback came in the return game against Exeter when the Chiefs managed a 16–27 defeat of the Harlequins at The Stoop. The slide continued as they suffered back to back away defeats against Saracens and Gloucester, losing 27–12 and 17–15 respectively. But they managed to secure their place in the playoffs after a 26–42 win away in Worcester. They played Leicester at Welford Road in the semifinal, but lost 33–16 after conceding 3 second half tries.

== Heineken Cup ==
Having qualified for the 2012-13 Heineken Cup on the virtue of their 2012 Aviva Premiership title, Harlequins produced a strong showing in the pool stage, remaining unbeaten in pool 3 against Biarritz Olympique, Connacht Rugby and Italian newborn Pro 12 franchise Zebre to be granted #1 seed for the quarterfinals. However, they lost to #8 seed Munster at home 12–18 in the quarterfinal, despite leading 9–6 at half-time.

== LV= Cup ==
Played during the Autumn Internationals and the Six Nations the LV= Cup thus featured a Harlequins team stripped of its players on international duty. Choosing to rely on a team full of developing players, Director of Rugby Conor O'Shea showed the club was full of promising talents when it remained unbeaten throughout the pool stage and went on to beat Bath Rugby (31–23) in the semifinal at The Stoop and Sale Sharks (32–14) in the final at Sixways Stadium with names like Nick Easter, Nick Evans, Olly Kohn, Ugo Monye and Jordan Turner-Hall not featured on any matchsheet for the whole campaign. This was Harlequins' third title in the English/Anglo-Welsh Cup and the first since the inception of the Anglo-Welsh format. This title granted Harlequins a place in the 2013-14 Heineken Cup.

== Premiership Rugby 7s Series ==
Prior to the start of the XVs season, Harlequins participated (like all other Premiership clubs of the 2012–2013 season) in the Premiership 7s Series. Hosting the Group A tournament at the Twickenham Stoop, Harlequins failed to progress to the Final following two wins (over London Irish and London Wasps) and a loss (to Saracens) on bonus points difference.

== Aviva A League ==
Parallel to the first half of the Aviva Premiership, Harlequins A team (a mix of academy and First Team players) competed in the Aviva A League. Drawing with Saracens Storm in the first game, they went on to win their next four games securing a semi-final berth in the process before losing the last Conference game to Bath United. Level on league point with Saracens Storm they still topped the Southern Conference on points difference. Harlequins went on to beat Gloucester United (40–19) in the semifinal before getting the better over Saracens Storm (37–12) in the final, both times at The Stoop, to win the club's second title in the competition.
