= Antonie Claassen =

France international rugby union player

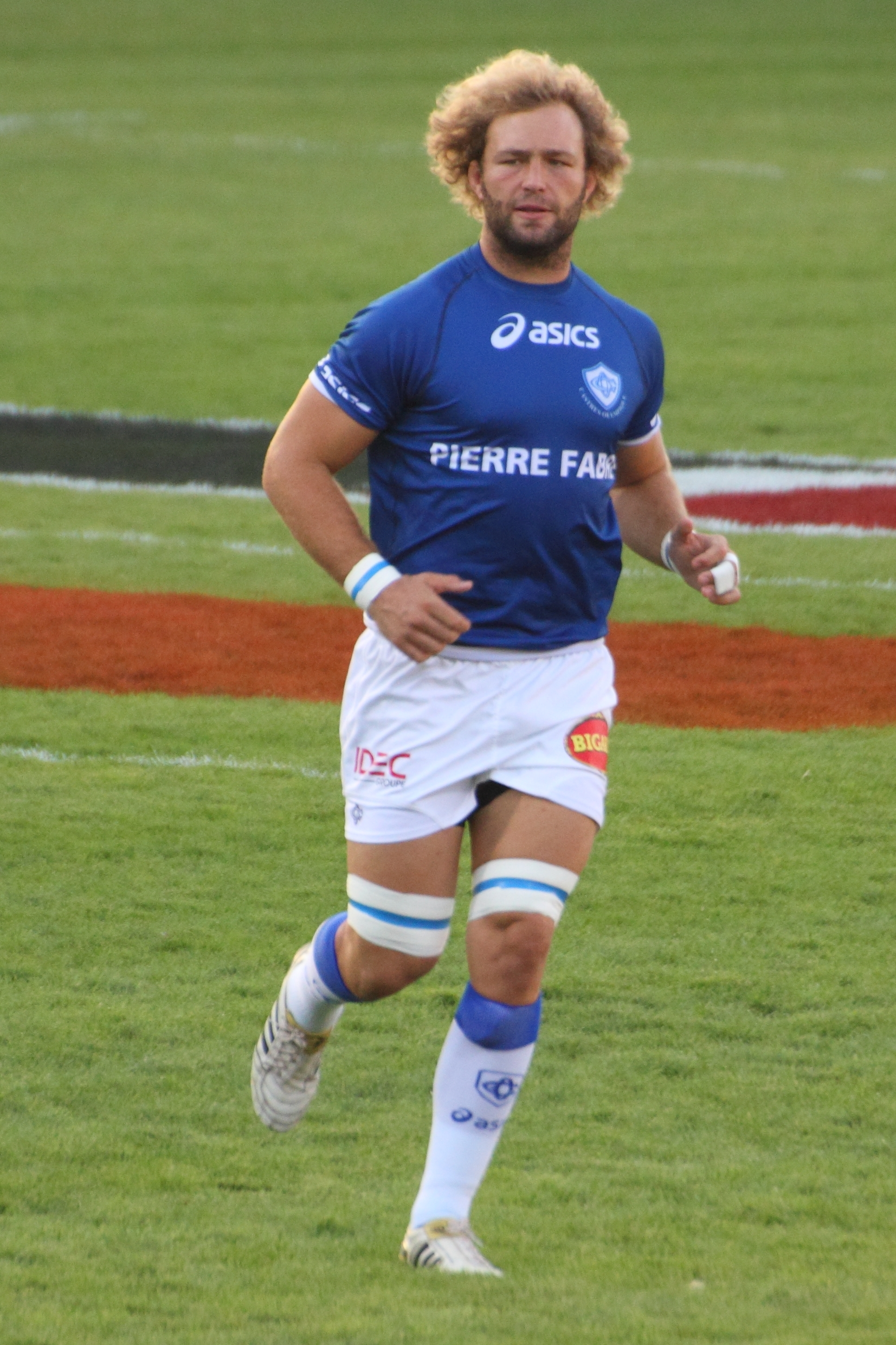
- Born: 20 October 1984 (age 42) Durban, South Africa
- Height: 1.93 m (6 ft 4 in)
- Weight: 104 kg (16 st 5 lb)

Rugby union career
- Position: Flanker
Senior career
Years	Team	Apps	(Points)
2007–2012	Brive	128	(55)
2012–2014	Castres	53	(30)
2014–present	Racing 92	145	(55)
- Correct as of 11 September 2020
Provincial / State sides
Years	Team	Apps	(Points)
2007	Blue Bulls	1	(0)
International career
Years	Team	Apps	(Points)
2013–2014	France	6	(0)
- Correct as of 8 March 2014

Antonie Delport Claassen (born 20 October 1984) is a French and South African rugby union player. His position is Flanker and he currently plays for Racing 92 in the Top 14. He began his career with Blue Bulls in his native South Africa before moving to CA Brive in 2006. His father, Wynand Claassen was a South African international and Springboks captain in 1981–82. Claassen made his debut for France in the 2013 Six Nations Championship, qualifying on residency grounds.

He graduated from Durban High School in 2002, and represented South Africa at U19 level.

== Honours ==
=== Club ===
(France) Castres

- Top 14: 2012–13

(France) Racing 92

- Top 14: 2015–16
