= Craig Mitchell (rugby union) =

Wales international rugby union player

- Born: Craig Mitchell; 3 May 1986 (age 40) Neath, Wales
- Height: 185 cm (6 ft 1 in)
- Weight: 119 kg (18 st 10 lb; 262 lb)
- School: Dwr-y-Felin Comprehensive School

Rugby union career
- Position: Prop
Amateur team(s)
Years	Team	Apps	(Points)
- Tonna RFC
Senior career
Years	Team	Apps	(Points)
2004–2010	Neath RFC	52	(15)
2005–2011	Ospreys	35	(0)
2006–2007	Swansea RFC	5	(0)
2011–2014	Exeter Chiefs	37	(5)
2014–2016	Cardiff Blues	9	(0)
2015	Pontypridd RFC		
2016–2017	Newport Gwent Dragons	11	(0)
2018–2019	Yorkshire Carnegie	17	(0)
2018	→Newcastle Falcons	0	(0)
2019–2021	Cornish Pirates	16	(0)
- Correct as of 17 November 2022
International career
Years	Team	Apps	(Points)
2009–2013	Wales	15	(5)

Craig Mitchell (born 3 May 1986) is a retired Wales international rugby union player. He previously played for Aviva Premiership side Exeter Chiefs. He subsequently joined Newport Gwent Dragons and he was released at the end of the 2016–17 season.

Mitchell's position of choice was a prop.

== Club career ==
Mitchell made his debut for the Ospreys in 2006, but had to wait until 2009 to make his first start for the club, the milestone coming against Leinster on 18 September.

In 2011, Mitchell departed the Ospreys for the Exeter Chiefs, and spent three seasons with the newly promoted side.

It was announced by Exeter Chiefs on 21 January 2014 that Mitchell will be leaving the Chiefs to join Welsh side Cardiff Blues on a three-year deal.

Mitchell departed Cardiff one year ahead of the end of his contract, joining the Newport Gwent Dragons in a bid for more match time.

Following his release from the Dragons, Mitchell was signed by Bath Rugby on a trial basis, but was injured in training and never made an appearance for the West Country club.

In early 2018, Mitchell joined Yorkshire Carnegie, initially as a short term signing, but later extended his contract to cover another season.

At the beginning of the 2018–2019 season, Mitchell signed with Newcastle Falcons as short term injury cover, before rejoining Yorkshire.

Following his stint with Yorkshire, Mitchell joined RFU Championship team Cornish Pirates in 2019. He retired at the end of the 2020–2021 season.

== International career ==
In international rugby he has earned caps for Wales at U16, U18, U19 and U21 levels; he has captained the U19 squad. During the 2009 Summer Tour to America and Canada, Michell earned two senior caps for his country, both as a replacement.

Following his introduction into the Welsh set up in the summer of 2009, Mitchell was selected as the only specialist tight-head in Warren Gatland's autumn test squad, however despite his specialist knowledge in the position, fellow Osprey player Paul James was selected to start against New Zealand in the No.3 spot and has held the spot for several international tests since. Mitchell did feature during the autumn, earning his third international Welsh cap coming on as a replacement against Samoa.

Not initially selected in the touring squad for the 2010 summer trip to New Zealand and home test against South Africa, Mitchell was on the stand by list as injury cover. He was called upon prior to departure to New Zealand, and joined the full squad, coming off the bench in the second test against New Zealand.

Mitchell was part of the Wales squad for the 2011 Rugby World Cup, and made his sole appearance of the tournament with a start against Namibia.

Mitchell scored a try in the 2013 Six Nations Championship match against Ireland.

During the 2013 tour of Japan, Mitchell was ruled out of the first test due to injury, but came off the bench in the second. This was to be his final appearance for Wales.

=== International tries ===
Try	Opponent	Location	Venue	Competition	Date	Result
1	Ireland	Cardiff, Wales	Millennium Stadium	2013 Six Nations	2 February 2013	Loss

== Controversy ==
It was announced on 27 June 2013 that Mitchell had been arrested in Brisbane, Australia following the Lions first test against Australia on 22 June. Mitchell who had been in Australia as a fan admitted assault occasioning bodily harm with a circumstance of aggravation (being he was in company) after hitting Cian Barry at the Red Hill pub in Brisbane. Mitchell was sentenced to six months' imprisonment wholly suspended for two years, fined A$1,800 and ordered to pay A$3,000 in compensation to the victim. In court Mitchell described his actions as "My actions... were totally unacceptable and unforgivable."
