= Scott Andrews (rugby union, born 1989) =

Wales international rugby union footballer

- Born: Scott Andrews; 1 August 1989 (age 37) Church Village, Wales
- Height: 1.88 m (6 ft 2 in)
- Weight: 120 kg (19 st; 260 lb)

Rugby union career
- Position: Tighthead Prop
Amateur team(s)
Years	Team	Apps	(Points)
2007–2010	Glamorgan Wanderers	46	(5)
2012–2022	Cardiff	5	(0)
Senior career
Years	Team	Apps	(Points)
2008–2022	Cardiff Blues	189	(15)
2017	→ Bath (loan)	1	(0)
2021	→ Worcester Warriors (loan)	2	(0)
International career
Years	Team	Apps	(Points)
- Wales U16
- Wales U18
2008–2009	Wales U20	14	(5)
2011–2017	Wales	14	(0)

Scott Andrews (born 1 August 1989) is a Welsh former professional rugby union player. A prop, Andrews spent his entire professional career with Cardiff Rugby apart from two brief loans to Bath and Worcester Warriors. Andrews represented Wales, earning 14 caps between 2011 and 2017.

== Early life ==
From Church Village, Andrews attended Y Pant School, and played for Glamorgan Wanderers RFC.

== Club career ==
=== Cardiff Blues ===
Having come through the Cardiff Academy, Andrews made his competitive debut for Cardiff in 2009 against Ulster. He signed a three year extension with the club at the end of the season. In 2016, he briefly converted to hooker, before reverting back to prop. Andrews extended again with Cardiff in May 2019.

Andrews retired at the end of the 2021–22 United Rugby Championship season. Apart from the loan periods, he spent his entire career with Cardiff.

==== Bath loan ====
In September 2017, English side Bath announced that they had signed Andrews on a one-month loan deal.

==== Worcester loan ====
Andrews joined Worcester Warriors on a short-term loan in May 2021, as injury coverage.

== International career ==
=== Youth ===
Andrews represented Wales at U16, U18, and U20. He was part of the team that reached the semi-finals of the 2008 IRB Junior World Championship. He served as captain during the 2009 Six Nations Under 20s Championship and 2009 IRB Junior World Championship.

=== Senior ===
In May 2010 Andrews was added to the Wales national rugby union team standby list for the summer matches due to injury to Gethin Jenkins. In January 2011 he was named the Wales squad for the 2011 Six Nations Championship.

He made his full international debut for Wales versus the Barbarians on 4 June 2011 as a second-half replacement.

He was named in the preliminary squad for the 2011 Rugby World Cup but was ultimately left out of the final squad.

Andrews featured for Wales as they won the title during the 2013 Six Nations Championship. He won his final cap in 2017, as Wales beat South Africa 24-22.

== Coaching career ==
In 2022, he acted as a player-coach for Cardiff RFC, while coaching the Academy. He joined the coaching staff of Cardiff Rugby ahead of the 2023–24 United Rugby Championship. He previously worked with Cardiff U16 and U18, as well as Cardiff University.
