= Mike McCarthy (rugby union) =

Ireland international rugby union player (born 1981)

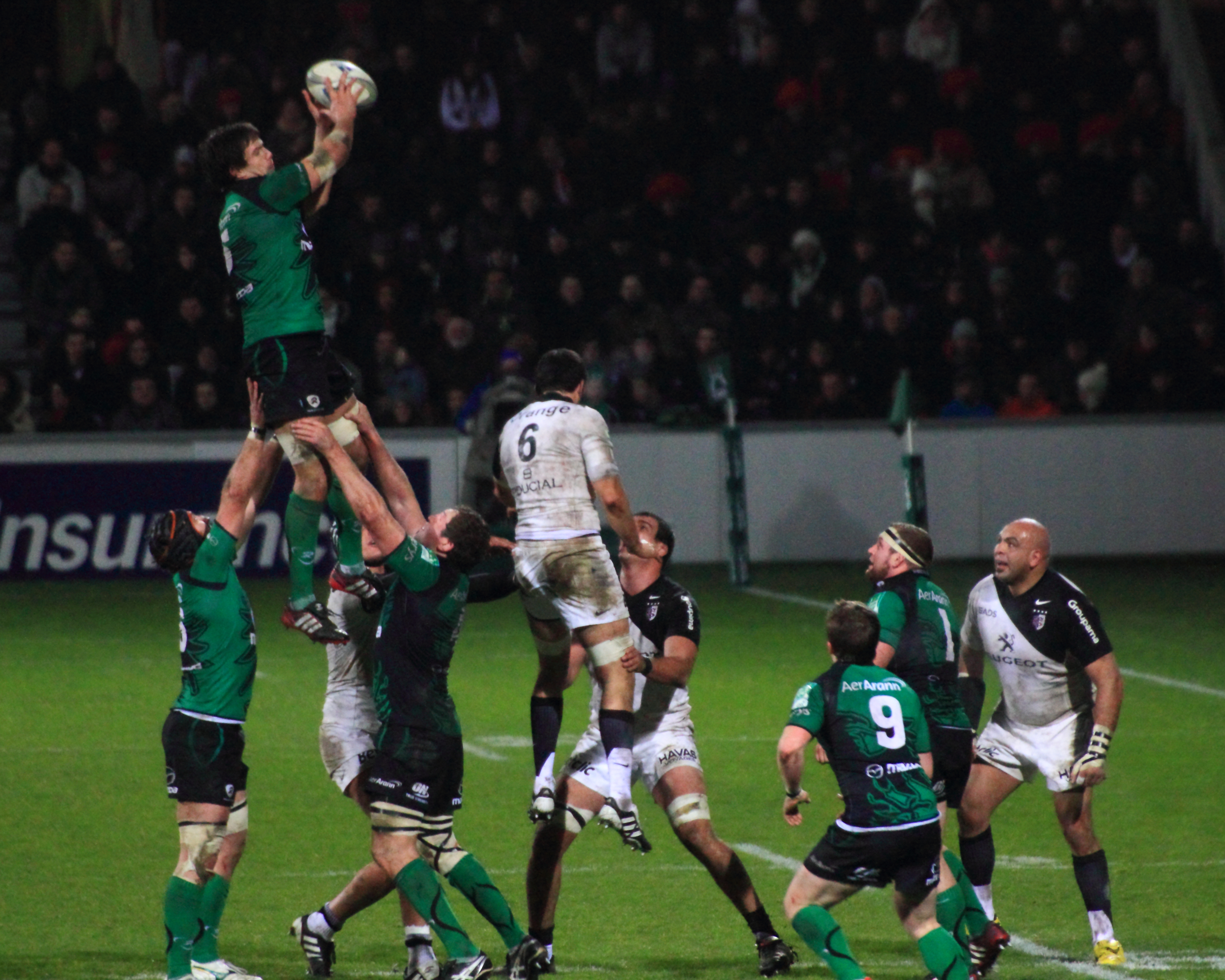
- McCarthy in 2012
- Born: Michael McCarthy; 27 November 1981 (age 44) England
- Height: 1.95 m (6 ft 5 in)
- Weight: 115 kg (18 st 2 lb)
- School: Sedbergh School

Rugby union career
- Position(s): Second row, Back row
Provincial / State sides
Years	Team	Apps	(Points)
2001–2002	London Wasps	6	
2003–2004	Connacht	24	(10)
2004–2007	Newcastle Falcons	74	(60)
2007–2013	Connacht	136	(25)
2013–2017	Leinster	75	(0)
- Correct as of 17 May 2017
International career
Years	Team	Apps	(Points)
2002	England U21		
2011–2015	Ireland Wolfhounds	3	(0)
2011–2016	Ireland	19	(0)
- Correct as of 13 Feb 2016

Michael McCarthy (born 27 November 1981) is an English-born retired Irish professional rugby union. He played his club rugby for the Irish provincial team Leinster Rugby in the Pro14, having joined from rival Irish team Connacht in 2013. He played in the second row and as a flanker.

== Early life ==
McCarthy was born and raised in England. He was educated at Sedbergh School.

== Club career ==
=== Early career ===
McCarthy started his professional career playing for Premiership club London Wasps in the 2001–02 season. He made a single substitute appearance for the team in that year's Premiership against Sale Sharks, and did not play in any European games. The following season he made an increased number of appearances, playing three times in the 2002–03 Premiership as Wasps won the title. He also made two appearances in the 2002–03 European Challenge Cup, playing both first round ties against Overmarch Parma, including making his first start away to the Italians on 12 October 2002, in a tournament Wasps also went on to win, for a domestic and European double.

=== Connacht ===
McCarthy joined the Irish side Connacht in 2003. He made his debut from the bench in a Celtic League match away against Welsh side Cardiff Blues on 13 September. McCarthy played 16 times in total in the 2003–04 Celtic League, scoring two tries. He also made eight appearances in the European Challenge Cup as Connacht made it to the semi-finals, where they were narrowly beaten by eventual winners Harlequins over two legs. McCarthy left Connacht after one season, returning to English rugby with the Newcastle Falcons.

=== Newcastle Falcons ===
McCarthy made his debut for the Newcastle Falcons on 5 September 2004 against Worcester Warriors, scoring a try as the Falcons won 30–9. He made a total of 21 appearances in the 2004–05 Premiership and scored two tries. That season he helped the team reach the quarter-finals of the Heineken Cup, starting all of the group games and scoring a try against the Newport Gwent Dragons. He also played in the quarter-final itself against Stade Français at Parc des Princes, as Newcastle were beaten 48–8 by the eventual runners-up.

In the following season's Premiership, McCarthy played 19 games, and scored three tries as Newcastle finished 7th in the league. After having been in the Heineken Cup the previous season, Newcastle dropped back into the European Challenge Cup. McCarthy played in four of their six group games, scoring three tries in a match with Italian side L'Aquila. In the following round the Falcons faced McCarthy's old side Connacht, and he scored a try in a 23–3 victory at Kingston Park. Newcastle went through to the semi-finals, where McCarthy played in a narrow defeat to London Irish, by a final score of 27–22. McCarthy was named the supporters' player of the season in 2006.

McCarthy played only nine games for Newcastle in the 2006–07 Premiership, but scored a try against the Sale Sharks. He also played five times in the Challenge Cup, scoring a try against Petrarca Padova, as Newcastle qualified for the quarter-finals. McCarthy did not feature in the quarter-final loss to Clermont. McCarthy left the Falcons in 2007, having played for the side 74 times.

=== Return to Connacht ===
McCarthy rejoined Connacht at the beginning of the 2007–08 season. He played in 14 games for the team in the 2007–08 Celtic League. McCarthy also started in all 6 of Connacht's group games in the 2007–08 European Challenge Cup, which included two matches against his former side Newcastle. The 2008–09 saw him make fewer appearances in both competitions, playing in just nine of Connacht's 2008–09 Celtic League matches and four of their Challenge Cup games.

In the following season, McCarthy made a total 23 appearances for the team, including starting all of Connacht's matches in the Challenge Cup, as they made it to the semi-finals. The team faced a Toulon team featuring the English fly-half Jonny Wilkinson, a former Newcastle teammate of McCarthy's. Toulon won 19–12 in Galway, with Wilkinson kicking 14 of the French club's points. The following season saw McCarthy start in every one of Connacht's 22 2010–11 Celtic League, and appear in all six of the team's Challenge Cup games, starting only one of these games on the bench, though Connacht failed to make it past the pool stages. He earned his 100th cap for Connacht that season, against Bayonne in the Challenge Cup on 15 January 2011.

The 2011–12 season saw Connacht qualify for the Heineken Cup for the first time. McCarthy started every one of Connacht's games, including the team's first ever win in the competition, in the home game against Harlequins. He also started 19 of Connacht's games in the Pro 12, the new name for the Celtic League. The following season saw McCarthy play 13 games in the 2012–13 Pro 12, scoring a single try. Connacht also played in the Heineken Cup, this time winning three of their six games, with McCarthy again an ever present. This was McCarthy's last season with the province however, as it had been announced in December 2012 that McCarthy would join rival Irish province Leinster at the end of the season. He left Connacht having made 134 appearances in his second spell with the team, and 160 appearances overall.

=== Leinster ===
McCarthy joined Leinster ahead of the 2013–14 season. He made his debut against Scarlets on 6 September 2013 in the Pro 12. He made his European debut for the side in October that year against the Ospreys, and went on to start all six of Leinster's pool games in the 2013–14 Heineken Cup. Since the 2023-24 season, he has worked as the "warm-up" MC before regular season Leinster home matches, introducing such entertainment as soccer's Viking clap (albeit without the spontaneity of the soccer version), and being surprise-tackled by Leinster's mascot, Leo the Lion.

=== RC Narbonne ===
On 6 March 2017, McCarthy signed a two-year contract with French club RC Narbonne in the Pro D2 ahead of the 2017–18 season. On 17 May 2017, McCarthy confirmed that he would not be joining Narbonne and has been forced to retire due to an elbow injury.

== International career ==
In his early career McCarthy was part of the English under-age set-up, but later switched his allegiance to Ireland. In January 2011, McCarthy received his first call up for Ireland as part of the squad for the 2011 Six Nations Championship. He was the only uncapped player named in the squad, but did not earn any caps in the tournament. In August that year, however, McCarthy made his Ireland debut in a Rugby World Cup warm-up game against Scotland at Murrayfield.

McCarthy was again part of the Ireland squad for the 2012 Six Nations. He was a late replacement for Donncha O'Callaghan in the 32–14 win over Scotland on 10 March. McCarthy again replaced O'Callaghan from the bench in the 30–9 defeat to England, seven days later.

McCarthy was called up for the 2012 November internationals. McCarthy played in each game, starting both full tests that Ireland played. He partnered Donnacha Ryan in the second row in the match against South Africa on 10 November, as well as the game with Argentina on 24 November. Two months later he was called up to the 2013 Six Nations squad. This championship saw McCarthy start four of Ireland's five games, missing the Scotland game through injury.
