= Andrew Coombs =

Wales international rugby union player

Andrew Jonathan Coombs
- Born: Andrew Jonathan Coombs; October 27, 1984 (age 42) Merthyr Tydfil, Wales
- Height: 194 cm (6 ft 4 in)
- Weight: 109 kg (17 st 2 lb)

Rugby union career
- Position(s): Number eight Flanker; Lock
Senior career
Years	Team	Apps	(Points)
2004-2005	Pontypool RFC	30	(35)
2006–2011	Newport RFC	101	(102)
2009–2016	NG Dragons	80	(40)
- Correct as of 27 June 2016
International career
Years	Team	Apps	(Points)
2013–2014	Wales	10	(0)
- Correct as of 16 Mar 2014

Andrew Coombs is a former Wales international rugby union player. His position is back-row forward or lock forward.

== Career ==
Coombs attended Ysgol Gyfun Rhydywaun, and is a Welsh speaker. He played for Newport Youth and Pontypool RFC before joining Newport RFC at the start of the 2006–07 season. He made almost fifty appearances for Newport, and in August 2008 was made Newport's club captain, succeeding Dai Pattison who had captained the club for the previous two years. He represented Wales at under-18 level.

Coombs made his debut for the Newport Gwent Dragons regional team in the 2009–10 season.

Coombs retired from rugby in June 2016 due to a knee injury sustained whilst playing against the Cardiff Blues in the championship cup semi-final 2015.

== International ==
In January 2013 he was selected in the 35 man Wales squad for the 2013 Six Nations championship.

Coombs made his international debut for Wales as a lock forward in their first match of the 2013 Six Nations Championship against Ireland in the Millennium Stadium on 2 February 2013.

In May 2013 he was selected in the Wales national rugby union team 32 man training squad for the summer 2013 tour to Japan.

== Newport RFC record ==
Season	Games	Tries	Conversions	Penalties	Drop goals	Total points
2006–07	13	1	0	0	0	5
2007–08	23	6	0	0	0	30
2008–09	26	7	1	0	0	37
TOTAL	102	14	1	0	0	72

== International caps ==
Played 3, won 2, lost 1, drawn 0

Cap	Date	Team	Position	Shirt Number	Home or Away	Tournament	Venue	Result	Score
1	2 February 2013	Ireland	Lock	4	Home	Six Nations 2013	Millennium Stadium, Cardiff	Loss	22-30
2	9 February 2013	France	Lock	4	Away	Six Nations 2013	Stade de France, Paris	Win	6–16
3	23 February 2013	Italy	Lock	4	Away	Six Nations 2013	Stadio Olimpico, Rome	Win	9–26
4	16 March 2013	England	Lock	19	Home	Six Nations 2013	Millennium Stadium, Cardiff	Win	30–3
4	1 February 2014	Italy	Lock	19	Home	Six Nations 2014	Millennium Stadium, Cardiff	Win	23-15
