= Alberto De Marchi =

- Born: Alberto De Marchi; 13 March 1986 (age 40) Jesolo, Italy
- Height: 1.83 m (6 ft 0 in)
- Weight: 123 kg (271 lb; 19 st 5 lb)

Rugby union career
- Position: Prop
Youth career
- 2000–04: San Donà
Senior career
Years	Team	Apps	(Points)
2004–06	San Donà		
2006–10	Crociati Parma	59	(5)
2010–12	Aironi	44	(0)
2012–14	Benetton Treviso	38	(5)
2014−15	Sale Sharks	15	(5)
2015−19	Benetton Treviso	58	(0)
- Correct as of 22 Feb 2019
International career
Years	Team	Apps	(Points)
2007−11	Italy A	12	(0)
2012–15	Italy	29	(0)
- Correct as of 11 Oct 2015

Alberto De Marchi (born 13 March 1986 in Jesolo, Italy) is a retired Italian rugby union player. His preferred position is Prop. He previously played for Benetton Treviso in the Pro12 competition. Before that he played for Aironi. He also represented Italy U21s with which he played the Under 21 Rugby World Championship and Italy A.

On 19 March 2014, De Marchi made his move to the English Aviva Premiership to join Sale Sharks on a two-year contract. He played for the Italy national rugby union team that competed at the 2015 Rugby World Cup.

== Honours ==
- Coppa Italia
  - Crociati Parma: 2007–08, 2008–09
- Supercoppa d'Italia
  - Crociati Parma: 2008
