= Davide Giazzon =

Italy international rugby union player

- Born: Davide Giazzon; 16 January 1986 (age 40) Venice, Italy
- Height: 1.83 m (6 ft 0 in)
- Weight: 108 kg (238 lb; 17.0 st)

Rugby union career
- Position: Hooker or Prop
Senior career
Years	Team	Apps	(Points)
2000-05	Mogliano		
2005-08	San Marco		
2008-11	Crociati RFC	66	(5)
2011-12	Rovigo	24	(5)
2011	→Aironi	2	(0)
2012-14	Zebre	32	(0)
2014-17	Treviso	53	(20)
2017	Mogliano	7	(10)
- Correct as of 28 August 2015
International career
Years	Team	Apps	(Points)
2006	Italy Under 20	3	(0)
2009-10	Emerging Italy	6	(0)
2012-16	Italy	29	(0)
- Correct as of 19 March 2016
Coaching career
- Years: Team
- 2018−2020: Villorba Rugby (Head Coch)
- 2020–2024: Rovigo Delta (assistant coach)
- 2024–: Rovigo Delta (head coach)

Davide Giazzon (born 16 January 1986 in Venice) is an Italian rugby union player. His preferred position is at Hooker, although he can also play at Prop. He currently plays for Zebre in the Pro12 and the Heineken Cup. He gained his first international cap in 2012 against Argentina as a sub, having previously played for Italy A and the Italian U-21 team.

From June 2024 he was Head Coach of Rovigo Delta.
