= Alessandro Zanni =

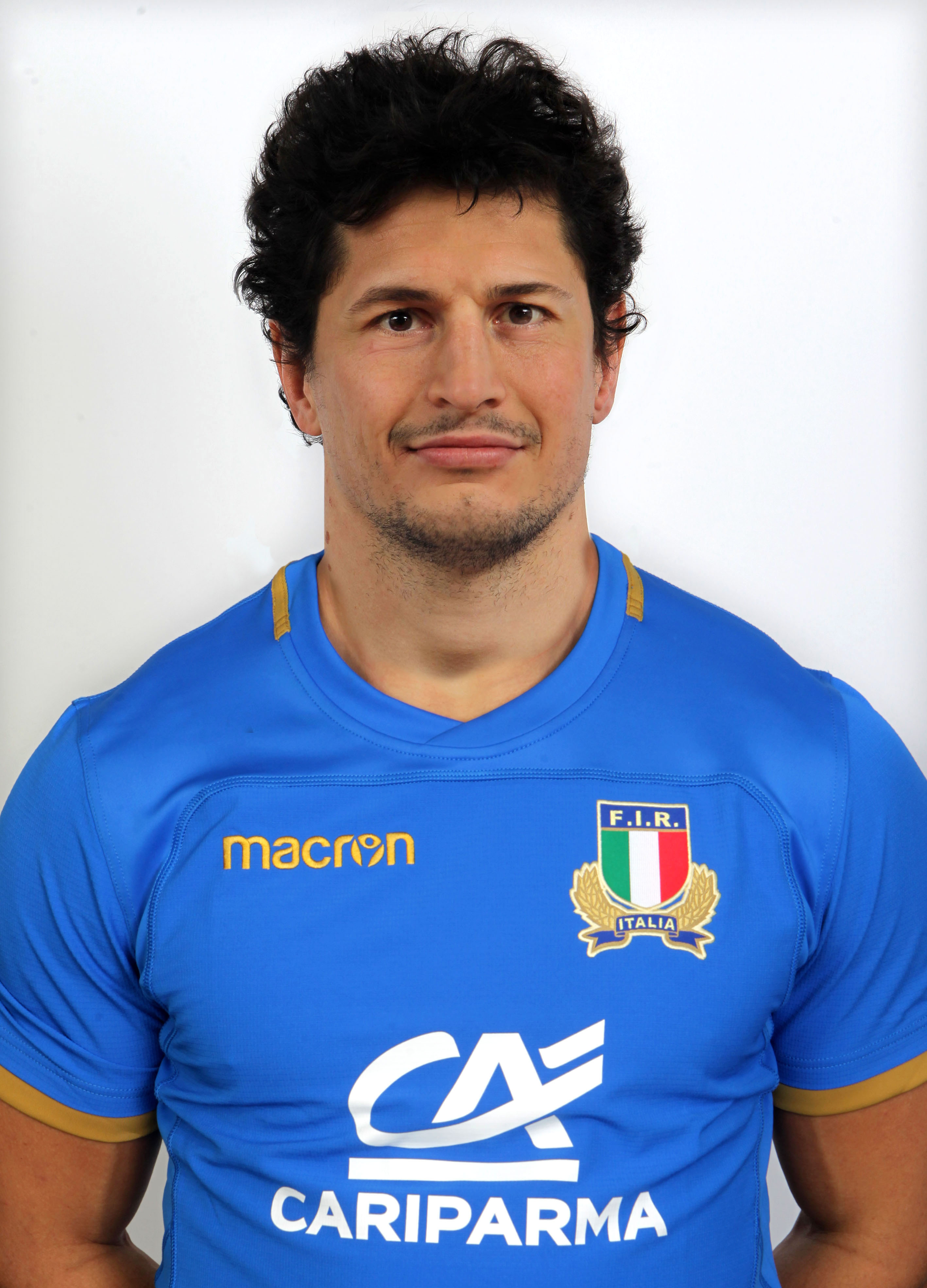
- Zanni in 2017
- Born: Alessandro Zanni; 31 January 1984 (age 42) Udine, Italy
- Height: 1.93 m (6 ft 4 in)
- Weight: 106.5 kg (16 st 11 lb; 235 lb)

Rugby union career
- Position: Flanker / Number 8
Senior career
Years	Team	Apps	(Points)
2003−2005	Udine	17	(50)
2005–2009	Calvisano	68	(60)
2009–2020	Benetton Treviso	137	(55)
- Correct as of 28 August 2015
International career
Years	Team	Apps	(Points)
2004–2005	Italy U21		
2005–2020	Italy	119	(20)
- Correct as of 22 Feb 2020
Coaching career
- Years: Team
- 2020–: Benetton (assistant coach)

Alessandro Zanni (born 31 January 1984 in Udine) is a former Italian rugby union player who has played over 100 times for Italy. His usual position was a number 8, but in national team and Benetton he has played openside flanker, blindside flanker and Lock.

Zanni made his debut for the Italian national team in November 2005 in a Test against Tonga and has been a regular in the Italian test team ever since winning his 100th cap against England on 4 February 2018.

About Rugby World Cup, on 21 August 2011, he was named in the final 31-man squad for the 2015 Rugby World Cup., on 24 August 2015, he was named in the final 31-man squad for the 2015 Rugby World Cup and on 18 August 2019, he was named in the final 31-man squad for the 2019 Rugby World Cup. He also parteciped to 2007 Rugby World Cup.
