= Ryan Bevington =

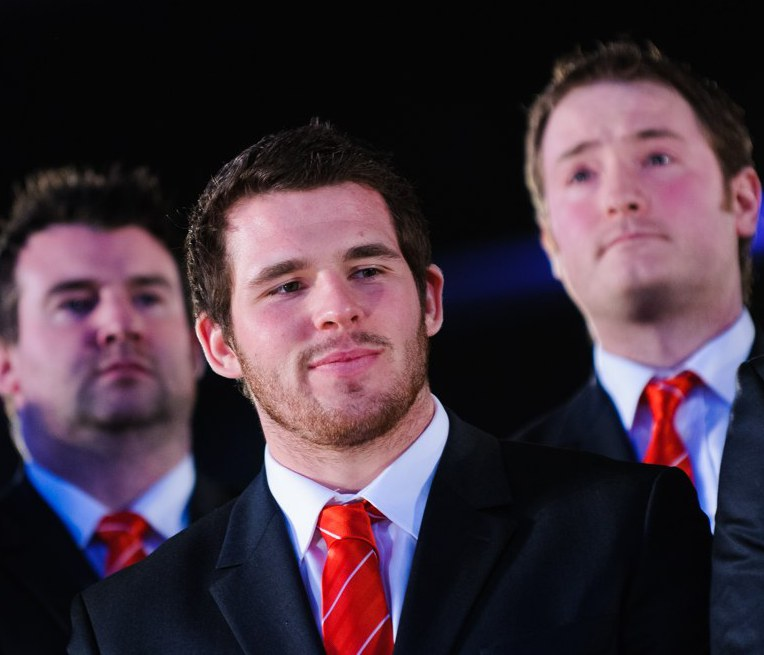
- Born: Ryan Bevington; 9 December 1988 (age 37) Bridgend, Wales
- Height: 183 cm (6 ft 0 in)
- Weight: 116 kg (18 st 4 lb; 256 lb)
- School: Porthcawl Comprehensive School

Rugby union career
- Position: Loosehead Prop
- Current team: Dragons
Amateur team(s)
Years	Team	Apps	(Points)
2007–2012	Bridgend RFC		
Senior career
Years	Team	Apps	(Points)
2008–16	Ospreys	112	(15)
2016–2018	Bristol Rugby	31	(0)
2018–2022	Dragons	0	(0)
- Correct as of 11 march 2025
International career
Years	Team	Apps	(Points)
2011–2014	Wales	15	
- Correct as of 11 march 2025

Ryan Bevington (born 9 December 1988) is a Wales international rugby union player. A prop forward, he most recently played club rugby for the Dragons having previously played for Bristol, Bridgend and Ospreys.

In March 2018, Bevington was announced as signing for Dragons from the 2018–19 season.

== International ==
In January 2011 he was named the Wales national rugby union team for the 2011 Six Nations Championship.

He made his full international debut for Wales versus the Barbarians on 4 June 2011.
