= Edoardo Gori =

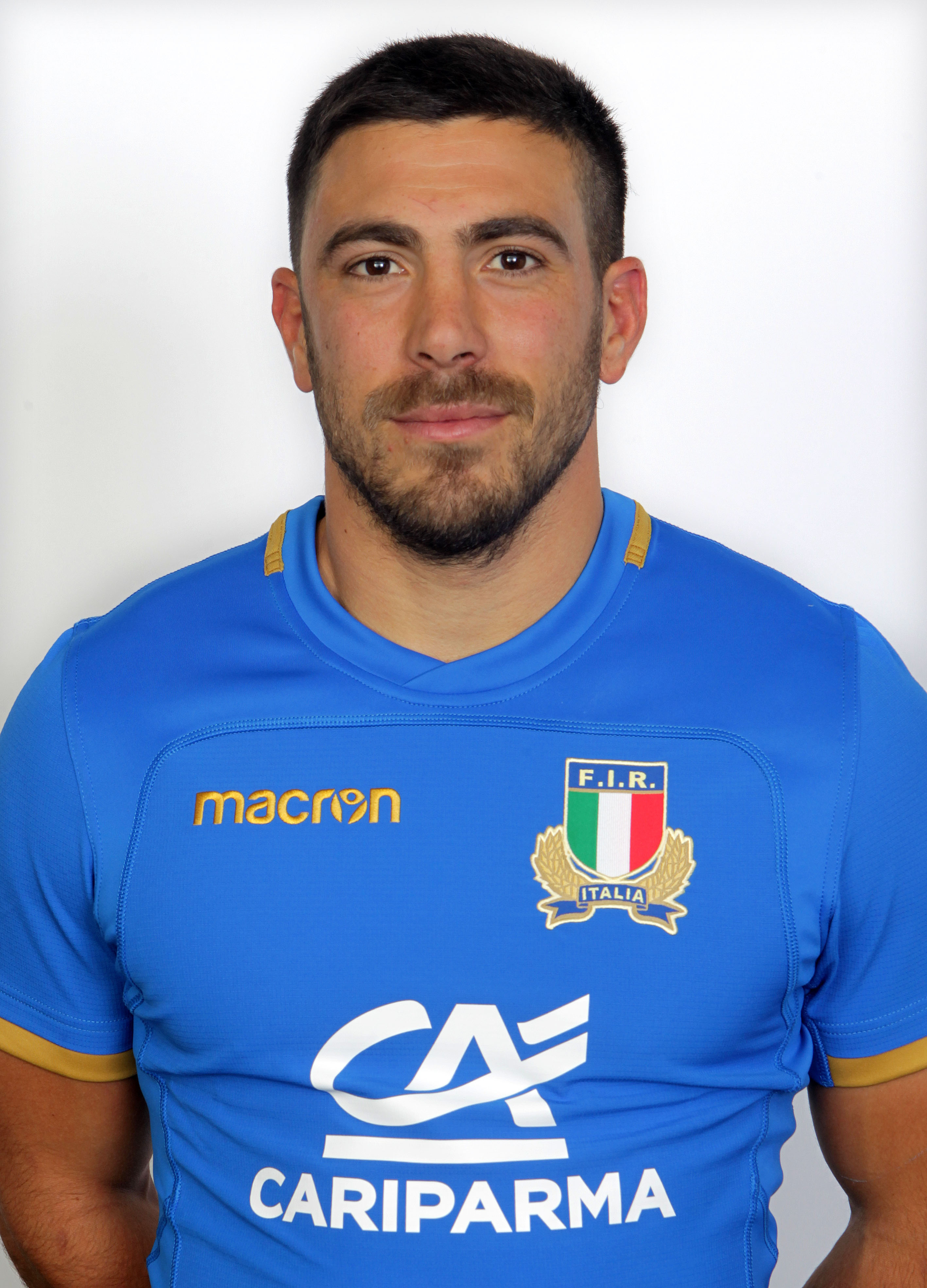
- Edoardo Gori, 2017
- Born: Edoardo Gori; 5 March 1990 (age 36) Borgo San Lorenzo, Italy
- Height: 178 cm (5 ft 10 in)
- Weight: 81 kg (179 lb; 12 st 11 lb)

Rugby union career
- Position: Scrum-half
Youth career
- 2006−2009: Cavalieri Prato
Senior career
Years	Team	Apps	(Points)
2009–2010	Cavalieri Prato	9	(0)
2010–2019	Benetton	101	(60)
2019−2024	Colomiers	96	(35)
- Correct as of 11 March 2023
International career
Years	Team	Apps	(Points)
2008–2010	Italy Under 20	13	(15)
2010–2019	Italy	69	(35)
- Correct as of 7 February 2019

Edoardo Ugo Gori (born 5 March 1990, in Borgo San Lorenzo) was an Italian rugby union player and currently he played as Scrum-half. He represented Italy on 69 occasions with 5 tries.

From 2010 to 2019 he played for Benetton Rugby. In 2019 he signed for Colomiers in Pro D2 and he played for French team until 2024.

He was selected to the 25-man Italian squad to face Argentina in November 2010. In the same month he made his Italy debut against Australia. He also played at the 2011 Rugby World Cup in New Zealand. On 24 August 2015, he was named in the final 31-man squad for the 2015 Rugby World Cup.
