= Olly Kohn =

Wales international rugby union player

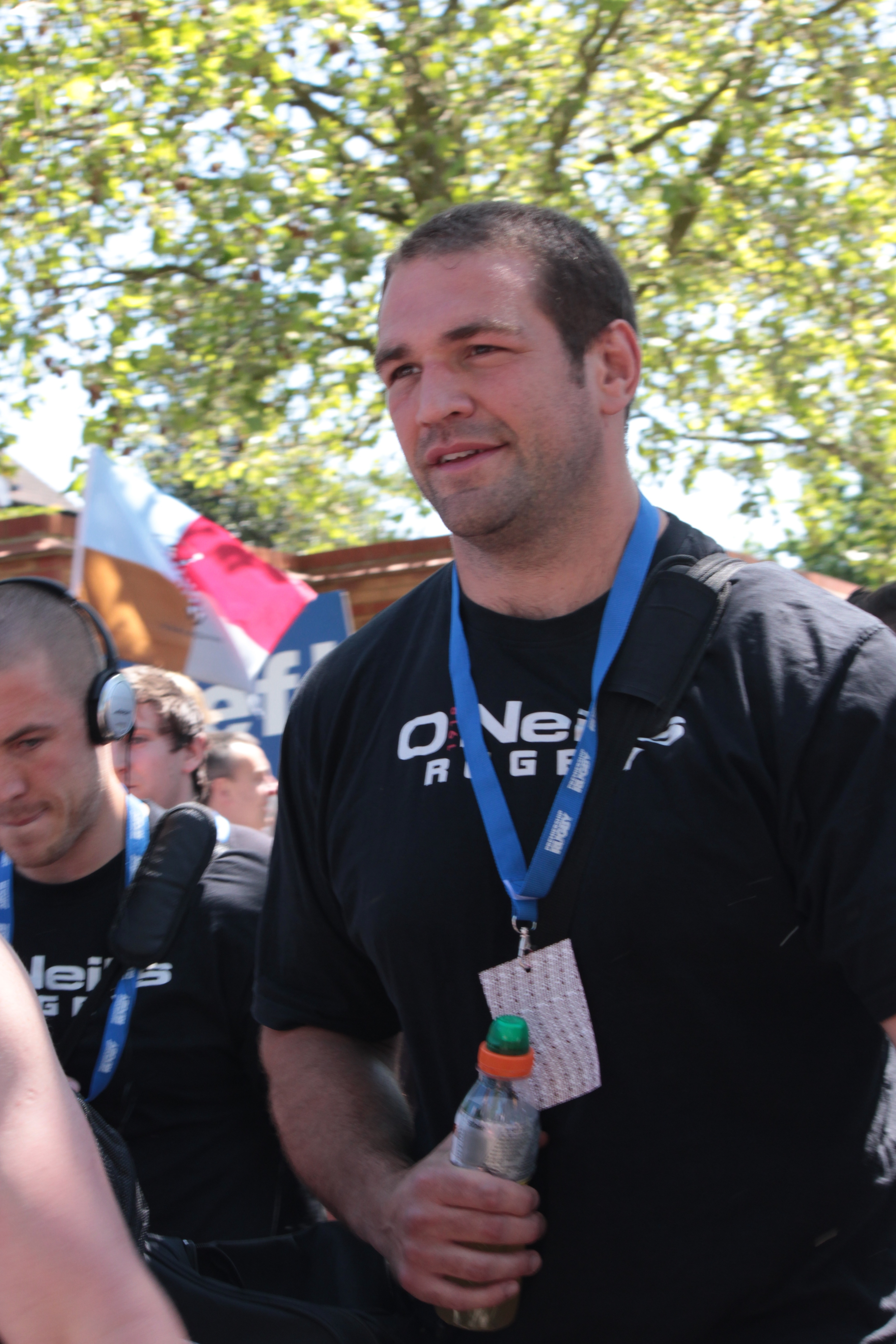
- Born: Oliver Kohn; 19 March 1981 (age 45) Bristol, England
- Height: 2.01 m (6 ft 7 in)
- Weight: 138 kg (21 st 10 lb)
- School: The Ridings High School; St. Brendan's Sixth Form College

Rugby union career
- Position: Lock
Youth career
- Clifton
Senior career
Years	Team	Apps	(Points)
1999-2002	Bristol	0	(0)
2002-2003	Plymouth Albion	23	(25)
2003-2006	Bristol	38	(10)
2006-2013	Harlequins	140	(20)
International career
Years	Team	Apps	(Points)
2013	Wales	1	(0)

Olly Kohn (born 19 March 1981, in Bristol) is a Wales international rugby union player for Harlequins having previously played for Bristol and Plymouth Albion.

A lock forward, Kohn won the English Premiership with Harlequins in 2011-12, starting in the final against Leicester Tigers.

Kohn was forced to retire at the end of the 2012/2013 season due to injury.

== International ==
In January 2013 Kohn announced that he was eligible to play for Wales as his grandfather was from the Rhymney Valley. On 25 January 2013 Kohn was called up to the Wales squad for the 2013 Six Nations Championship. Kohn made his international debut for Wales in their first match of the 2013 Six Nations Championship against Ireland at the Millennium Stadium, Cardiff on 2 February 2013 as a second-half replacement.
