= Yannick Forestier =

France international rugby union player

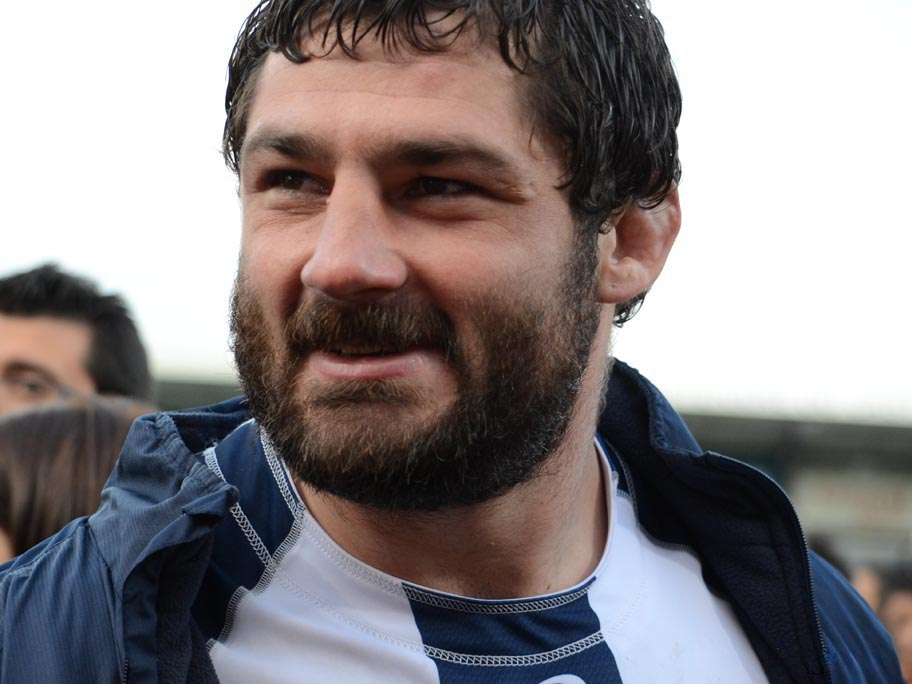
- Born: 2 January 1982 (age 44) Narbonne, France
- Height: 1.81 m (5 ft 11 1/2 in)
- Weight: 109 kg (17 st 2 lb)

Rugby union career
- Position: Prop
Senior career
Years	Team	Apps	(Points)
2001–2002	Narbonne		
2002–2003	Albi		
2003–2004	Colomiers	10	(0)
2004–2016	Castres	164	(35)
International career
Years	Team	Apps	(Points)
2012–2014	France	11	(0)

Yannick Forestier (born 2 January 1982) is a former French rugby union player. His position was Prop and played most of his career for Castres Olympique in the Top 14.

== Honours ==
=== Club ===
(France) Castres

- Top 14: 2012–13
