= Francesco Minto =

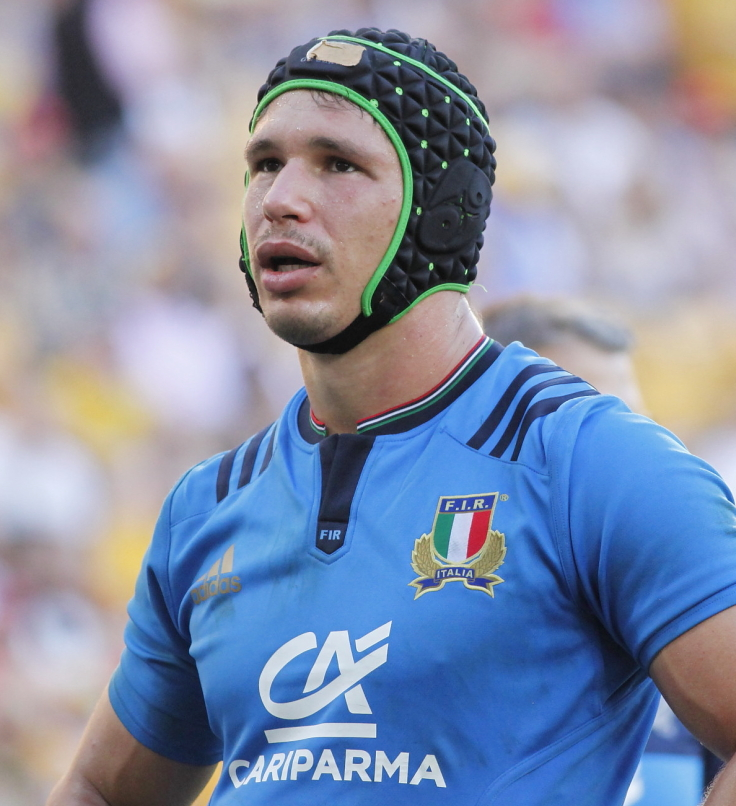
- Minto playing for Italy against the Wallabies, 24 June 2017
- Born: Francesco Minto; 20 May 1987 (age 39) Benevento, Italy
- Height: 6 ft 4 in (1.93 m)
- Weight: 16 st 0 lb (224 lb; 102 kg)

Rugby union career
- Position: Lock / Flank
Senior career
Years	Team	Apps	(Points)
2005−06	Mirano		
2006–10	Crociati RFC	47	(0)
2010–18	Benetton	109	(30)
2018−19	I Medicei	21	(5)
- Correct as of 27 Apr 2019
International career
Years	Team	Apps	(Points)
2008−2011	Emerging Italy	9	(0)
2012–2017	Italy	39	(0)
- Correct as of 25 Nov 2017

Francesco Minto (born 29 May 1987) is a former Italian rugby union player, and has been capped for the Italian national team for 39 occasions. His usual position was at flank.

From 2010 to 2018 he currently played for Benetton in the Pro14.

On 24 August 2015, he was named in the final 31-man squad for the 2015 Rugby World Cup.
