= Luc Ducalcon =

France international rugby union player

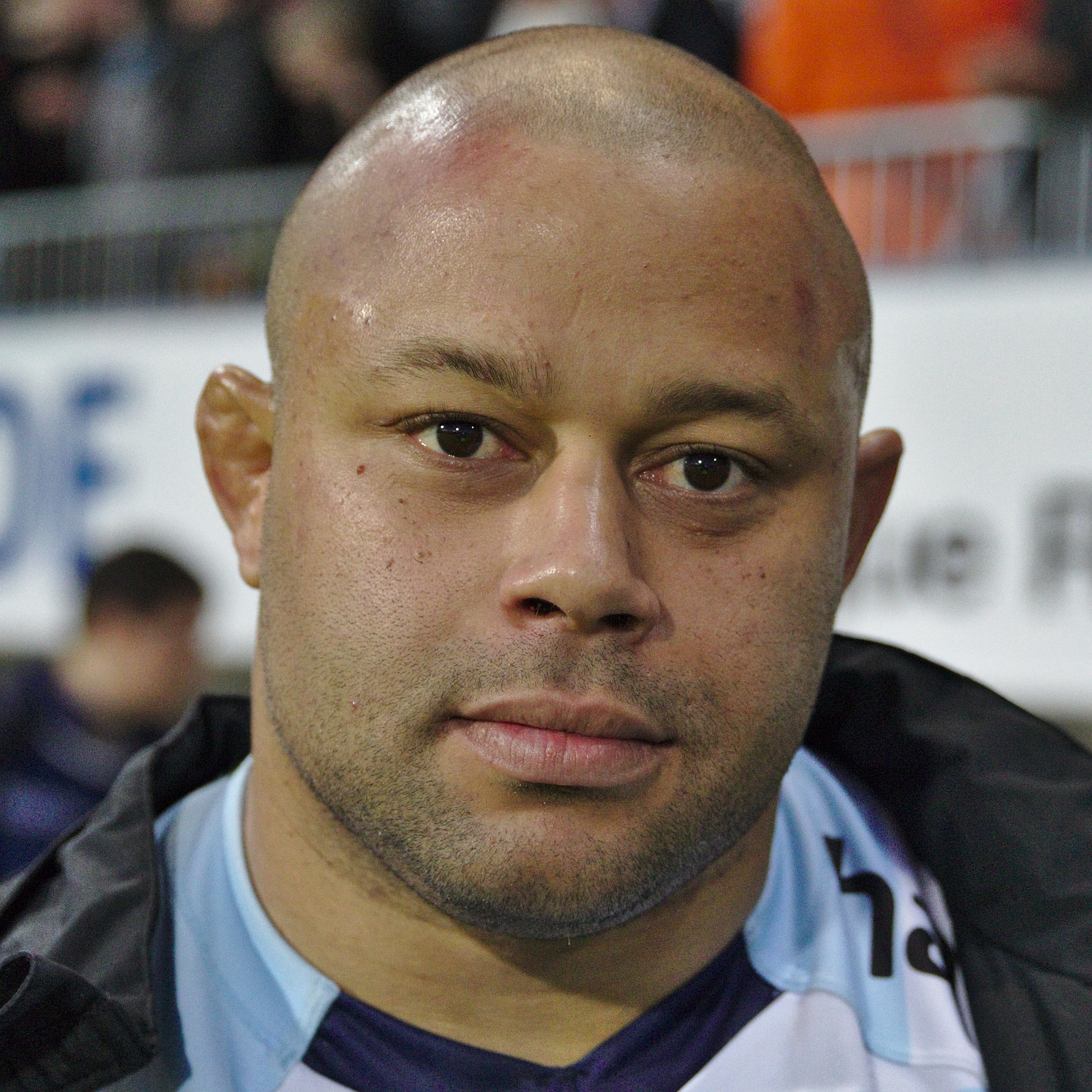
- Born: 2 January 1984 (age 42) La Fère, France
- Height: 1.83 m (6 ft 0 in)
- Weight: 121 kg (267 lb)

Rugby union career
- Position: Tighthead prop
- Current team: Racing Metro
Senior career
Years	Team	Apps	(Points)
-2005	La Rochelle	0	(0)
2005-2007	Narbonne	32	(10)
2007-2012	Castres Olympique	95	(15)
2012-18	Racing Métro	152	(20)
- Correct as of 20 December 2019
International career
Years	Team	Apps	(Points)
2010-2013	France	17	(0)
- Correct as of 22 June 2013

Luc Ducalcon (born 2 January 1984) is a French rugby union player. Ducalcon, who is a tighthead prop, plays his club rugby for Racing Métro 92. He made his debut for France against Scotland on 7 February 2010.

== Honours ==
(France) Racing 92

- Top 14: 2015–16
