= Antonio Pavanello =

Italy international rugby union player

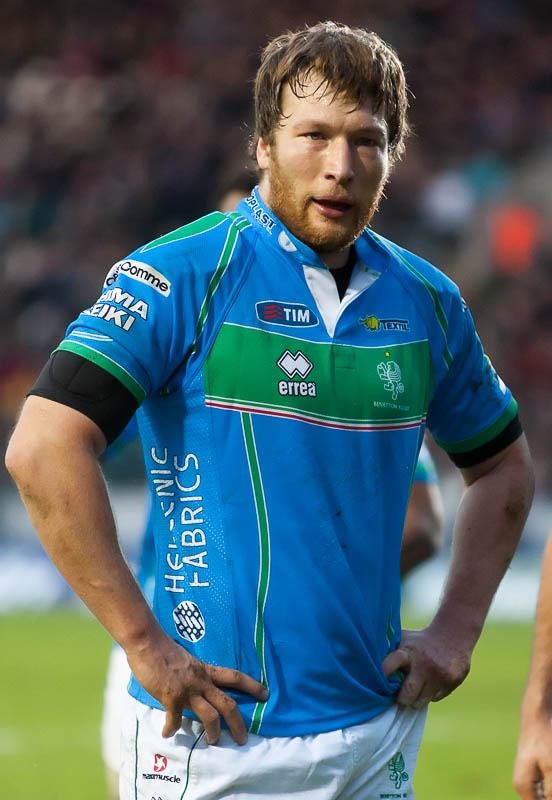
- Born: 13 October 1982 (age 44) Agordo, Italy
- Height: 1.95 m (6 ft 5 in)
- Weight: 113 kg (249 lb; 17.8 st)

Rugby union career
- Position: Second Row
Senior career
Years	Team	Apps	(Points)
2001–05	Rovigo		
2005–15	Treviso	205	(30)
- Correct as of 9 March 2014
International career
Years	Team	Apps	(Points)
2009−10	Italy A	6	(5)
2005–14	Italy	23	(0)
- Correct as of 9 March 2014

Antonio Pavanello (Italian pronunciation: [anˈtɔːnjo pavaˈnɛllo]; born 13 October 1982) is an Italian former rugby union player. His preferred position was as lock although he could also play equally well in the back row. He played for Benetton Treviso in the Pro14 competition and the European Heineken Cup.

On 16 December 2025 Pavanello has been elected as president of Benetton Rugby, for which he had previously served as sporting director since his retirement in 2015.

== Club career ==
He began his career playing since youth level for Rugby Rovigo, making his first appearance in the Italian first division in 2002, aged 19. After five seasons at Rovigo, in 2005 he then transferred to Benetton Treviso, the main club of nearby city Treviso. Starting from the 2009–10 season, he was also made club captain in place of Benjamin De Jager; Pavanello has consequently held the honour of being both the last captain of Treviso competing in the Italian first division (2009–10) and leading his team into their first ever match for the Celtic League tournament (2010–11), a home game in which they defeated the Scarlets.

== National team ==
While playing for youth and senior teams of Rugby Rovigo, he made a good enough impression to be selected for Italy at Under 19, Under 21 and 'A' levels. During his time in Treviso he has been capped five times by the Italy national rugby union team until 2007, playing 11 minutes against Argentina and 29 minutes against Australia in 2005. He gained his third cap against Argentina in 2007 playing 6 minutes as a replacement. Pavanello was then basically dropped from the Italian main team for the whole tenure of Nick Mallett as head-coach (2007–11): though formally in the list of players eligible for taking the pitch in the 2010 Six Nations Championship, he only played in three test matches. Despite good efforts with the Italian 'A' team at the 2011 Churchill Cup, he was not selected for the 2011 Rugby World Cup in New Zealand; his drop caused some criticism since the Italian team had poorly performed at line-out at the 2011 Six Nations Championship, whereas Treviso second-row led by Pavanello had proved consistent in this specific fundamental during the same season, but only fellow second-row teammate Corniel van Zyl was selected for the World Cup. In the wake of the 2012 Six Nations Championship, under newly installed head-coach Jacques Brunel, Pavanello regained his place in the national team. In the tournament, he had to skip the first game against France due to ban, before taking the pitch against England and Ireland; in the latter game, he suffered an injury which prevented him from finishing the tournament.

== Personal life ==
Pavanello gained a master's degree in Architecture from Iuav University of Venice in October 2008. Pavanello is married and has a daughter born in 2011.
