= Paul James (rugby union) =

Wales international rugby union player

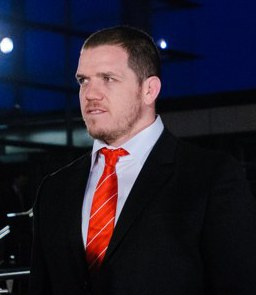
- Born: Paul James; 13 May 1982 (age 44) Neath, Wales
- Height: 185 cm (6 ft 1 in)
- Weight: 115 kg (18 st 2 lb; 254 lb)
- School: Dwr-y-Felin Comprehensive School

Rugby union career
- Position: Prop
- Current team: Ospreys
Senior career
Years	Team	Apps	(Points)
2001–03	Neath	23	(5)
2004–06	Swansea	2	(5)
2012–15	Bath	74	(5)
- Correct as of 30 May 2015
Provincial / State sides
Years	Team	Apps	(Points)
2003–12, 2015–18	Ospreys	232	(35)
- Correct as of 31 December 2017
International career
Years	Team	Apps	(Points)
2003–2016	Wales	66	(0)
- Correct as of 12 March 2016

Paul James (born 13 May 1982 in Neath, Wales) is a former Welsh international rugby union player. James' position of choice was as a prop. In November 2009, James was called into the Wales team to play in the problem tight-head position against New Zealand at the Millennium Stadium on 7 November 2009.

In May 2012 he agreed a two-year contract with Bath Rugby

On 20 October 2014, it was announced James would return to Ospreys on a two-year deal at the end of the Aviva Premiership season. James coached junior side Baglan rfc.
