= 2014 Six Nations Championship =

Rugby union tournament

- Date: 1 February – 15 March 2014
- Countries: England; France; Ireland; Italy; Scotland; Wales

Tournament statistics
- Champions: Ireland (12th title)
- Triple Crown: England (24th title)
- Matches played: 15
- Attendance: 1,038,744 (69,250 per match)
- Tries scored: 61 (4.07 per match)
- Top point scorer: (Ireland) Johnny Sexton (66)
- Top try scorers: (England) Mike Brown (4) (Ireland) Johnny Sexton (4)
- Player of the tournament: (England) Mike Brown
- Official website: Official website

The 2014 Six Nations Championship, known as the 2014 RBS 6 Nations because of the tournament's sponsorship by the Royal Bank of Scotland, was the 15th series of the Six Nations Championship, the annual northern hemisphere rugby union championship. It was contested by England, France, Ireland, Italy, Scotland and Wales. Including the competition's previous incarnations as the Home Nations Championship and Five Nations Championship, it was the 120th edition of the tournament.

Going into the final day, three teams could have still won the championship – Ireland, England and France. In the final game, Ireland hung on to win against France by just two points and secure the championship, on points difference over England. This was their first championship since 2009, and the 12th title they have won, including predecessor championships.

The final game also saw the retirement of Brian O'Driscoll from international rugby, with a record number of 141 international caps – 133 for Ireland (83 as captain), and 8 for the British and Irish Lions.

England won the Triple Crown by beating Wales, Scotland and Ireland – they became the first team to win the Triple Crown while another of the Home Nations won the championship outright.

The 2014 tournament saw 12 players earn their first cap – four French, three English, two Scottish, one Irish, one Italian and one Welsh. Sergio Parisse and Martin Castrogiovanni became the most-capped Italian players with 105 caps, with Gethin Jenkins earning the same number to become the most-capped Welsh player. In their match against Wales on 1 February, Italy broke the world record for the most-capped starting pack with 587 caps, surpassing the previous record of 546 caps as held by New Zealand.

In line with a global change to the Television Match Official (TMO) protocol, this was the first Six Nations tournament where the TMO could be called upon to review up to two phases prior to a try being scored and to review potential instances of foul play occurring at any time during the match. Two red cards were issued for foul play during the tournament after referral to the TMO.

== Participants ==
Nation	Stadium			Head coach	Captain
Nation	Home stadium	Capacity	City	Head coach	Captain
England	Twickenham Stadium	82,000	London	(England) Stuart Lancaster	Chris Robshaw
France	Stade de France	81,338	Saint-Denis	(France) Philippe Saint-André	Pascal Papé^{1}
Ireland	Aviva Stadium	51,700	Dublin	(New Zealand) Joe Schmidt	Paul O'Connell^{2}
Italy	Stadio Olimpico	73,261	Rome	(France) Jacques Brunel	Sergio Parisse^{3}
Scotland	Murrayfield Stadium	67,144	Edinburgh	(Australia) Scott Johnson (interim)	Kelly Brown^{4}
Wales	Millennium Stadium	74,500	Cardiff	(New Zealand) Warren Gatland	Sam Warburton^{5}

^{1} Replaced original captain Thierry Dusautoir who was ruled out of the Six Nations ahead of the tournament due to tearing a tendon in his right biceps.
^{2} Except the opening week fixture against Scotland as he was ruled out as he suffered from a chest infection. Jamie Heaslip was captain of the fixture.
^{3} Except the round 4 match against Ireland as he was injured. Marco Bortolami was captain for that match.
^{4} Except for the round 2 match against England and the round 3 match against Italy as he was dropped. Greig Laidlaw was captain of those matches. Brown returned as captain for the last two matches against France and Wales.
^{5} Except for the opening match against Italy as he did not captain as he had not recovered from a shoulder injury. Alun Wyn Jones was captain for that match.

== Table ==
Pos	Team	Pld	W	D	L	PF	PA	PD	T	Pts
1	Ireland	5	4	0	1	132	49	+83	16	8
2	England	5	4	0	1	138	65	+73	14	8
3	Wales	5	3	0	2	122	79	+43	11	6
4	France	5	3	0	2	101	100	+1	9	6
5	Scotland	5	1	0	4	47	138	−91	4	2
6	Italy	5	0	0	5	63	172	−109	7	0

Source: ESPN

== Fixtures ==
The 2014 Six Nations Championship saw the return of a Friday night fixture, last seen during the 2011 Six Nations Championship, where Wales faced France in the third week of the championship at the Millennium Stadium in Cardiff.

=== Round 1 ===
1 February 2014
14:30 GMT (UTC+0)

Wales	23–15	Italy
Try: Cuthbert 3' c S. Williams 37' c Con: Halfpenny (2/2) 4', 39'; Pen: Halfpenny (3/4) 28', 66', 73'	Report	Try: Campagnaro (2) 42' m, 68' c Con: Allan (1/2) 69'; Pen: Allan (1/2) 13'

Millennium Stadium, Cardiff
Attendance: 66,974
Referee: John Lacey (Ireland)

FB	15	Leigh Halfpenny
RW	14	Alex Cuthbert
OC	13	Scott Williams
IC	12	Jamie Roberts
LW	11	George North
FH	10	Rhys Priestland
SH	9	Mike Phillips	(substituted off) 67'
N8	8	Taulupe Faletau
OF	7	Justin Tipuric
BF	6	Dan Lydiate	(substituted off) 64'
RL	5	Alun Wyn Jones (c)
LL	4	Luke Charteris	(substituted off) 57'
TP	3	Adam Jones	(substituted off) 64'
HK	2	Richard Hibbard	(substituted off) 67'
LP	1	Paul James	(substituted off) 78'
Replacements:
HK	16	Ken Owens	(substituted on) 67'
PR	17	Ryan Bevington	(substituted on) 78'
PR	18	Rhodri Jones	(substituted on) 64'
LK	19	Andrew Coombs	(substituted on) 57'
FL	20	Sam Warburton	(substituted on) 64'
SH	21	Rhys Webb	(substituted on) 67'
FH	22	James Hook
FB	23	Liam Williams
Coach:
Warren Gatland

FB	15	Luke McLean
RW	14	Angelo Esposito
OC	13	Michele Campagnaro
IC	12	Alberto Sgarbi
LW	11	Leonardo Sarto	(substituted off) 76'
FH	10	Tommaso Allan
SH	9	Edoardo Gori	(substituted off) 65'
N8	8	Sergio Parisse (c)
OF	7	Mauro Bergamasco	(substituted off) 57'	(substituted on) 72'
BF	6	Alessandro Zanni		(substituted off) 72'
RL	5	Marco Bortolami	(substituted off) 68'
LL	4	Quintin Geldenhuys
TP	3	Martin Castrogiovanni	(substituted off) 68'
HK	2	Leonardo Ghiraldini	(substituted off) 57'
LP	1	Michele Rizzo	(substituted off) 55'
Replacements:
HK	16	Davide Giazzon	(substituted on) 57'
PR	17	Alberto De Marchi	(substituted on) 55'
PR	18	Lorenzo Cittadini	(substituted on) 68'
FL	19	Joshua Furno	(substituted on) 68'
FL	20	Francesco Minto	(substituted on) 57'
SH	21	Tobias Botes	(substituted on) 65'
FH	22	Luciano Orquera
WG	23	Tommaso Iannone	(substituted on) 76'
Coach:
Jacques Brunel

Man of the Match:
Michele Campagnaro (Italy)

Touch judges:
Glen Jackson (New Zealand)
Francisco Pastrana (Argentina)
Television match official:
Iain Ramage (Scotland)

Notes:

- Marco Bortolami became the fifth Italian player to earn 100 test caps.
- Angelo Esposito made his international debut for Italy.
- Italy's starting pack set a new record as the most-capped of all time. The pack entered the match with 587 caps, surpassing the previous record of 546 by New Zealand's pack against England on 16 November 2013.

1 February 2014
18:00 CET (UTC+1)

France	26–24	England
Try: Huget (2) 1' m, 17' m Fickou 76' c Con: Doussain (0/2); Machenaud (1/1) 78'; Pen: Doussain (2/2) 10', 22'; Machenaud (1/1) 69'	Report	Try: Brown 36' m Burrell 47' c Con: Farrell (1/2) 48'; Pen: Farrell (2/2) 5', 42'; Goode (1/1) 72'; Drop: Care (1/1) 56'

Stade de France, Saint-Denis
Attendance: 78,763
Referee: Nigel Owens (Wales)

FB	15	Brice Dulin
RW	14	Yoann Huget
OC	13	Mathieu Bastareaud	(substituted off) 74'
IC	12	Wesley Fofana
LW	11	Maxime Médard
FH	10	Jules Plisson
SH	9	Jean-Marc Doussain	(substituted off) 57'
N8	8	Louis Picamoles	(substituted off) 65'
OF	7	Bernard Le Roux	(substituted off) 40'
BF	6	Yannick Nyanga
RL	5	Pascal Papé (c)
LL	4	Alexandre Flanquart	(substituted off) 43'
TP	3	Nicolas Mas	(substituted off) 48'
HK	2	Benjamin Kayser	(substituted off) 43'
LP	1	Thomas Domingo	(substituted off) 48'
Replacements:
HK	16	Dimitri Szarzewski	(substituted on) 43'
PR	17	Yannick Forestier	(substituted on) 48'
PR	18	Rabah Slimani	(substituted on) 48'
LK	19	Yoann Maestri	(substituted on) 43'
FL	20	Antoine Burban	(substituted on) 40'
N8	21	Damien Chouly	(substituted on) 65'
SH	22	Maxime Machenaud	(substituted on) 57'
CE	23	Gaël Fickou	(substituted on) 74'
Coach:
Philippe Saint-André

FB	15	Mike Brown
RW	14	Jack Nowell	(substituted off) 65'
OC	13	Luther Burrell
IC	12	Billy Twelvetrees
LW	11	Jonny May	(substituted off) 8'
FH	10	Owen Farrell
SH	9	Danny Care	(substituted off) 61'
N8	8	Billy Vunipola	(substituted off) 65'
OF	7	Chris Robshaw (c)
BF	6	Tom Wood
RL	5	Courtney Lawes	(substituted off) 67'
LL	4	Joe Launchbury
TP	3	Dan Cole
HK	2	Dylan Hartley	(substituted off) 58'
LP	1	Joe Marler	(substituted off) 51'
Replacements:
HK	16	Tom Youngs	(substituted on) 58'
PR	17	Mako Vunipola	(substituted on) 51'
PR	18	Henry Thomas
LK	19	Dave Attwood	(substituted on) 67'
N8	20	Ben Morgan	(substituted on) 65'
SH	21	Lee Dickson	(substituted on) 61'
CE	22	Brad Barritt	(substituted on) 65'
FB	23	Alex Goode	(substituted on) 8'
Coach:
Stuart Lancaster

Man of the Match:
Yoann Huget (France)

Touch judges:
Alain Rolland (Ireland)
Stuart Berry (South Africa)
Television match official:
Jim Yuille (Scotland)

Notes:

- French captain Pascal Papé earned his 50th test cap.
- Antoine Burban and Jules Plisson made their international debuts for France.
- Luther Burrell and Jack Nowell made their international debuts for England.

2 February 2014
15:00 GMT (UTC+0)

Ireland	28–6	Scotland
Try: Trimble 40' m Heaslip 46' c R. Kearney 70' c Con: Sexton (2/3) 47', 72'; Pen: Sexton (3/3) 13', 22', 56'	Report	Pen: Laidlaw (2/3) 18', 42'

Aviva Stadium, Dublin
Attendance: 51,000
Referee: Craig Joubert (South Africa)

FB	15	Rob Kearney
RW	14	Andrew Trimble
OC	13	Brian O'Driscoll	(substituted off) 72'
IC	12	Luke Marshall
LW	11	David Kearney
FH	10	Johnny Sexton	(substituted off) 72'
SH	9	Conor Murray	(substituted off) 72'
N8	8	Jamie Heaslip (c)
OF	7	Chris Henry
BF	6	Peter O'Mahony	(substituted off) 65'
RL	5	Dan Tuohy
LL	4	Devin Toner	(substituted off) 73'
TP	3	Mike Ross	(substituted off) 62'
HK	2	Rory Best	(substituted off) 65'
LP	1	Cian Healy	(substituted off) 63'
Replacements:
HK	16	Seán Cronin	(substituted on) 65'
PR	17	Jack McGrath	(substituted on) 63'
PR	18	Martin Moore	(substituted on) 62'
LK	19	Iain Henderson	(substituted on) 73'
FL	20	Tommy O'Donnell	(substituted on) 65'
SH	21	Isaac Boss	(substituted on) 72'
FH	22	Paddy Jackson	(substituted on) 72'
WG	23	Fergus McFadden	(substituted on) 72'
Coach:
Joe Schmidt

FB	15	Stuart Hogg
RW	14	Sean Maitland	(substituted off) 31'
OC	13	Alex Dunbar
IC	12	Duncan Taylor	(substituted off) 64'
LW	11	Sean Lamont
FH	10	Duncan Weir
SH	9	Greig Laidlaw	(substituted off) 73'
N8	8	David Denton
OF	7	Kelly Brown (c)	(substituted off) 56'
BF	6	Ryan Wilson
RL	5	Jim Hamilton	(substituted off) 56'
LL	4	Tim Swinson
TP	3	Moray Low	(substituted off) 65'
HK	2	Ross Ford	(substituted off) 67'
LP	1	Ryan Grant	(substituted off) 52'
Replacements:
HK	16	Pat MacArthur	(substituted on) 67'
PR	17	Alasdair Dickinson	(substituted on) 52'
PR	18	Geoff Cross	(substituted on) 65'
LK	19	Richie Gray	(substituted on) 56'
N8	20	Johnnie Beattie	(substituted on) 56'
SH	21	Chris Cusiter	(substituted on) 73'
CE	22	Matt Scott	(substituted on) 64'
WG	23	Max Evans	(substituted on) 31'
Coach:
Scott Johnson

Man of the Match:
Jamie Heaslip (Ireland)

Touch judges:
Jaco Peyper (South Africa)
Mike Fraser (New Zealand)
Television match official:
Carlo Damasco (Italy)

Notes:

- Paul O'Connell was named at lock for this match, but was ruled out with a chest infection hours before kick-off. He was replaced by Dan Tuohy.
- Ireland reclaimed the Centenary Quaich after losing it in 2013.
- Martin Moore made his international debut for Ireland.
- Brian O'Driscoll made his 129th appearance for Ireland to surpass Ronan O'Gara as Ireland's most-capped player.
- Rob Kearney earned his 50th test cap.

=== Round 2 ===
8 February 2014
14:30 GMT (UTC+0)

Ireland	26–3	Wales
Try: Henry 31' c Jackson 78' c Con: Sexton (1/1) 33'; Jackson (1/1) 79'; Pen: Sexton (4/5) 7', 16', 45', 55'	Report	Pen: Halfpenny (1/1) 55'

Aviva Stadium, Dublin
Attendance: 51,045
Referee: Wayne Barnes (England)

FB	15	Rob Kearney
RW	14	Andrew Trimble	(substituted off) 60'
OC	13	Brian O'Driscoll
IC	12	Gordon D'Arcy
LW	11	David Kearney
FH	10	Johnny Sexton	(substituted off) 74'
SH	9	Conor Murray	(substituted off) 79'
N8	8	Jamie Heaslip
OF	7	Chris Henry
BF	6	Peter O'Mahony
RL	5	Paul O'Connell (c)	(substituted off) 54'
LL	4	Devin Toner
TP	3	Mike Ross	(substituted off) 54'
HK	2	Rory Best	(substituted off) 72'
LP	1	Cian Healy	(substituted off) 67'
Replacements:
HK	16	Seán Cronin	(substituted on) 72'
PR	17	Jack McGrath	(substituted on) 67'
PR	18	Martin Moore	(substituted on) 54'
LK	19	Dan Tuohy	(substituted on) 54'	(substituted off) 63'
FL	20	Tommy O'Donnell		(substituted on) 63'
SH	21	Isaac Boss	(substituted on) 79'
FH	22	Paddy Jackson	(substituted on) 74'
WG	23	Fergus McFadden	(substituted on) 60'
Coach:
Joe Schmidt

FB	15	Leigh Halfpenny
RW	14	Alex Cuthbert
OC	13	Scott Williams		(substituted off) 16'
IC	12	Jamie Roberts
LW	11	George North
FH	10	Rhys Priestland
SH	9	Mike Phillips	(yellow card) 79'
N8	8	Taulupe Faletau
OF	7	Sam Warburton (c)
BF	6	Dan Lydiate		(substituted off) 70'
RL	5	Alun Wyn Jones
LL	4	Andrew Coombs		(substituted off) 70'
TP	3	Adam Jones		(substituted off) 60'
HK	2	Richard Hibbard		(substituted off) 60'
LP	1	Gethin Jenkins		(substituted off) 70'
Replacements:
HK	16	Ken Owens		(substituted on) 60'
PR	17	Paul James		(substituted on) 70'
PR	18	Rhodri Jones		(substituted on) 60'
LK	19	Jake Ball		(substituted on) 70'
FL	20	Justin Tipuric		(substituted on) 70'
SH	21	Rhys Webb
FH	22	James Hook
FB	23	Liam Williams		(substituted on) 16'
Coach:
Warren Gatland

Man of the Match:
Peter O'Mahony (Ireland)

Touch judges:
Glen Jackson (New Zealand)
JP Doyle (England)
Television match official:
Graham Hughes (England)

Notes:

- Paul James and Leigh Halfpenny earned their 50th test caps, with Halfpenny becoming the youngest Welsh player to reach the landmark.
- Jake Ball made his international debut for Wales.
- This was Wales' first Six Nations fixture that they have failed to score a try in since their 28–9 loss to France in 2011.

8 February 2014
17:00 GMT (UTC+0)

Scotland	0–20	England
Pen: Laidlaw (0/2)	Report	Try: Burrell 14' c Brown 58' c Con: Farrell (2/2) 15', 59'; Pen: Farrell (1/4) 28'; Drop: Care (1/1) 5'

Murrayfield Stadium, Edinburgh
Attendance: 67,144
Referee: Jérôme Garcès (France)

FB	15	Stuart Hogg
RW	14	Tommy Seymour		(substituted off) 64'
OC	13	Alex Dunbar	(yellow card) 51'
IC	12	Matt Scott		(substituted off) 72'
LW	11	Sean Lamont
FH	10	Duncan Weir
SH	9	Greig Laidlaw (c)		(substituted off) 64'
N8	8	David Denton		(substituted off) 52'
OF	7	Chris Fusaro
BF	6	Ryan Wilson
RL	5	Jim Hamilton		(substituted off) 69'
LL	4	Tim Swinson
TP	3	Moray Low		(substituted off) 69'
HK	2	Ross Ford		(substituted off) 42'
LP	1	Ryan Grant		(substituted off) 42'
Replacements:
HK	16	Scott Lawson		(substituted on) 42'
PR	17	Alasdair Dickinson		(substituted on) 42'
PR	18	Geoff Cross		(substituted on) 69'
LK	19	Jonny Gray		(substituted on) 69'
N8	20	Johnnie Beattie		(substituted on) 52'
SH	21	Chris Cusiter		(substituted on) 64'
CE	22	Duncan Taylor		(substituted on) 72'
WG	23	Max Evans		(substituted on) 64'
Coach:
Scott Johnson

FB	15	Mike Brown
RW	14	Jack Nowell
OC	13	Luther Burrell	(substituted off) 73'
IC	12	Billy Twelvetrees
LW	11	Jonny May	(substituted off) 70'
FH	10	Owen Farrell
SH	9	Danny Care	(substituted off) 73'
N8	8	Billy Vunipola	(substituted off) 69'
OF	7	Chris Robshaw (c)
BF	6	Tom Wood
RL	5	Courtney Lawes
LL	4	Joe Launchbury	(substituted off) 62'
TP	3	Dan Cole	(substituted off) 75'
HK	2	Dylan Hartley	(substituted off) 69'
LP	1	Joe Marler	(substituted off) 64'
Replacements:
HK	16	Tom Youngs	(substituted on) 69'
PR	17	Mako Vunipola	(substituted on) 64'
PR	18	Henry Thomas	(substituted on) 75'
LK	19	Dave Attwood	(substituted on) 62'
N8	20	Ben Morgan	(substituted on) 69'
SH	21	Lee Dickson	(substituted on) 73'
CE	22	Brad Barritt	(substituted on) 73'
FB	23	Alex Goode	(substituted on) 70'
Coach:
Stuart Lancaster

Man of the Match:
Mike Brown (England)

Touch judges:
George Clancy (Ireland)
Mike Fraser (New Zealand)
Television match official:
Eric Gauzins (France)

Notes:

- England retained the Calcutta Cup.
- Chris Fusaro made his international debut for Scotland.
- This was the first match in which Scotland failed to score any points against England since their 15–0 loss in 1978.

9 February 2014
16:00 CET (UTC+1)

France	30–10	Italy
Try: Picamoles 42' c Fofana 45' c Bonneval 51' c Con: Doussain (3/3) 43', 46', 52'; Pen: Doussain (3/5) 26', 33', 38'	Report	Try: Iannone 76' c Con: Orquera (1/1) 77'; Pen: Allan (1/2) 28'; Garcia (0/2)

Stade de France, Saint-Denis
Attendance: 78,700
Referee: Jaco Peyper (South Africa)

FB	15	Brice Dulin
RW	14	Yoann Huget
OC	13	Mathieu Bastareaud		(substituted off) 72'
IC	12	Wesley Fofana
LW	11	Hugo Bonneval
FH	10	Jules Plisson		(substituted off) 66'
SH	9	Jean-Marc Doussain		(substituted off) 60'
N8	8	Louis Picamoles		(substituted off) 57'
OF	7	Bernard Le Roux				(substituted off) 75'
BF	6	Yannick Nyanga			(substituted off) 74'	(substituted on) 75'
RL	5	Yoann Maestri
LL	4	Pascal Papé (c)		(substituted off) 66'
TP	3	Nicolas Mas		(substituted off) 48'	(substituted on) 74'
HK	2	Dimitri Szarzewski		(substituted off) 57'
LP	1	Thomas Domingo		(substituted off) 48'
Replacements:
HK	16	Benjamin Kayser		(substituted on) 57'
PR	17	Yannick Forestier		(substituted on) 48'
PR	18	Rabah Slimani	(red card) 70'	(substituted on) 48'
LK	19	Sébastien Vahaamahina	(yellow card) 69'	(substituted on) 66'
N8	20	Damien Chouly		(substituted on) 57'
SH	21	Maxime Machenaud		(substituted on) 60'
FH	22	François Trinh-Duc		(substituted on) 66'
CE	23	Gaël Fickou		(substituted on) 72'
Coach:
Philippe Saint-André

FB	15	Luke McLean
RW	14	Tommaso Iannone
OC	13	Michele Campagnaro
IC	12	Gonzalo Garcia
LW	11	Leonardo Sarto
FH	10	Tommaso Allan		(substituted off) 63'
SH	9	Edoardo Gori		(substituted off) 63'
N8	8	Sergio Parisse (c)
OF	7	Mauro Bergamasco			(substituted off) 74'
BF	6	Francesco Minto		(substituted off) 51'
RL	5	Joshua Furno
LL	4	Quintin Geldenhuys		(substituted off) 70'
TP	3	Martin Castrogiovanni		(substituted off) 58'
HK	2	Leonardo Ghiraldini		(substituted off) 58'
LP	1	Alberto De Marchi		(substituted off) 58'	(substituted on) 74'
Replacements:
HK	16	Davide Giazzon		(substituted on) 58'
PR	17	Michele Rizzo	(red card) 70'	(substituted on) 58'
PR	18	Lorenzo Cittadini		(substituted on) 58'
LK	19	Marco Bortolami		(substituted on) 70'
FL	20	Alessandro Zanni		(substituted on) 51'
SH	21	Tobias Botes		(substituted on) 63'
FH	22	Luciano Orquera		(substituted on) 63'
WG	23	Angelo Esposito
Coach:
Jacques Brunel

Man of the Match:
Wesley Fofana (France)

Touch judges:
Craig Joubert (South Africa)
Francisco Pastrana (Argentina)
Television match official:
Gareth Simmonds (Wales)

Notes:

- Hugo Bonneval made his international debut for France.
- France reclaimed the Giuseppe Garibaldi Trophy after losing it in 2013.
- This was the first Six Nations fixture in which a red card was issued since Scott Murray was sent off when playing for Scotland against Wales in 2006.

=== Round 3 ===
21 February 2014
20:00 GMT (UTC+0)

Wales	27–6	France
Try: North 5' m Warburton 63' c Con: Halfpenny (1/2) 63'; Pen: Halfpenny (5/6) 2', 9', 19', 34', 40'	Report	Pen: Doussain (1/2) 16'; Plisson (1/2) 31'

Millennium Stadium, Cardiff
Attendance: 73,086
Referee: Alain Rolland (Ireland)

FB	15	Leigh Halfpenny		(substituted off) 70'
RW	14	Alex Cuthbert
OC	13	George North
IC	12	Jamie Roberts
LW	11	Liam Williams
FH	10	Rhys Priestland		(substituted off) 70'
SH	9	Rhys Webb		(substituted off) 70'
N8	8	Taulupe Faletau
OF	7	Sam Warburton (c)
BF	6	Dan Lydiate		(substituted off) 50'	(substituted on) 62'	(substituted off) 70'
RL	5	Jake Ball		(substituted off) 70'
LL	4	Luke Charteris
TP	3	Adam Jones		(substituted off) 70'
HK	2	Richard Hibbard		(substituted off) 56'
LP	1	Gethin Jenkins	(yellow card) 50'			(substituted off) 70'
Replacements:
HK	16	Ken Owens		(substituted on) 56'
PR	17	Paul James		(substituted on) 50'	(substituted off) 62'	(substituted on) 70'
PR	18	Rhodri Jones		(substituted on) 70'
LK	19	Andrew Coombs		(substituted on) 70'
FL	20	Justin Tipuric				(substituted on) 70'
SH	21	Mike Phillips		(substituted on) 70'
FH	22	Dan Biggar		(substituted on) 70'
FH	23	James Hook		(substituted on) 70'
Coach:
Warren Gatland

FB	15	Brice Dulin
RW	14	Yoann Huget
OC	13	Mathieu Bastareaud		(substituted off) 70'
IC	12	Wesley Fofana
LW	11	Hugo Bonneval
FH	10	Jules Plisson		(substituted off) 63'
SH	9	Jean-Marc Doussain		(substituted off) 40'
N8	8	Louis Picamoles	(yellow card) 62'
OF	7	Wenceslas Lauret
BF	6	Yannick Nyanga		(substituted off) 50'
RL	5	Yoann Maestri		(substituted off) 63'
LL	4	Pascal Papé (c)
TP	3	Nicolas Mas	(yellow card) 50'
HK	2	Dimitri Szarzewski		(substituted off) 63'
LP	1	Thomas Domingo		(substituted off) 63'
Replacements:
HK	16	Brice Mach		(substituted on) 63'
PR	17	Yannick Forestier		(substituted on) 63'
PR	18	Vincent Debaty		(substituted on) 50'	(substituted off) 62'
LK	19	Sébastien Vahaamahina		(substituted on) 63'
N8	20	Damien Chouly			(substituted on) 62'
SH	21	Maxime Machenaud		(substituted on) 40'
FH	22	Rémi Talès		(substituted on) 63'
CE	23	Gaël Fickou		(substituted on) 70'
Coach:
Philippe Saint-André

Man of the Match:
Gethin Jenkins (Wales)

Touch judges:
John Lacey (Ireland)
Dudley Phillips (Ireland)
Television match official:
Graham Hughes (England)

Notes:

- Brice Mach made his international debut for France.
- Alun Wyn Jones was named in the Wales starting XV, but was ruled out hours before kick-off due to an injury to his foot. Jake Ball was promoted from the bench, with Andrew Coombs taking his place.

22 February 2014
14:30 CET (UTC+1)

Italy	20–21	Scotland
Try: Allan 39' c Furno 70' c Con: Allan (1/1) 40'; Orquera (1/1) 72'; Pen: Allan (2/3) 13', 31'	Report	Try: Dunbar (2) 53' m, 67' c Con: Laidlaw (0/1); Weir (1/1) 67'; Pen: Laidlaw (2/2) 22', 45'; Drop: Weir (1/1) 79'

Stadio Olimpico, Rome
Attendance: 66,271
Referee: Steve Walsh (Australia)

FB	15	Luke McLean
RW	14	Angelo Esposito
OC	13	Michele Campagnaro
IC	12	Gonzalo Garcia
LW	11	Leonardo Sarto
FH	10	Tommaso Allan	(substituted off) 68'
SH	9	Edoardo Gori	(substituted off) 63'
N8	8	Sergio Parisse (c)
OF	7	Robert Barbieri	(substituted off) 63'
BF	6	Alessandro Zanni	(substituted off) 73'
RL	5	Joshua Furno
LL	4	Quintin Geldenhuys
TP	3	Martin Castrogiovanni	(substituted off) 57'
HK	2	Leonardo Ghiraldini	(substituted off) 57'
LP	1	Alberto De Marchi	(substituted off) 57'
Replacements:
HK	16	Davide Giazzon	(substituted on) 57'
PR	17	Matías Agüero	(substituted on) 57'
PR	18	Lorenzo Cittadini	(substituted on) 57'
LK	19	Marco Bortolami	(substituted on) 73'
FL	20	Paul Derbyshire	(substituted on) 63'
SH	21	Tobias Botes	(substituted on) 63'
FH	22	Luciano Orquera	(substituted on) 68'
WG	23	Tommaso Iannone
Coach:
Jacques Brunel

FB	15	Stuart Hogg
RW	14	Tommy Seymour	(substituted off) 55'
OC	13	Alex Dunbar	(substituted off) 72'
IC	12	Matt Scott
LW	11	Sean Lamont
FH	10	Duncan Weir
SH	9	Greig Laidlaw (c)	(substituted off) 63'
N8	8	Johnnie Beattie
OF	7	Chris Fusaro	(substituted off) 52'
BF	6	Ryan Wilson
RL	5	Jim Hamilton
LL	4	Richie Gray
TP	3	Moray Low	(substituted off) 38'
HK	2	Scott Lawson
LP	1	Ryan Grant	(substituted off) 58'
Replacements:
HK	16	Ross Ford
PR	17	Alasdair Dickinson	(substituted on) 58'
PR	18	Geoff Cross	(substituted on) 38'
LK	19	Tim Swinson
N8	20	David Denton	(substituted on) 52'
SH	21	Chris Cusiter	(substituted on) 63'
CE	22	Duncan Taylor	(substituted on) 72'
WG	23	Max Evans	(substituted on) 55'
Coach:
Scott Johnson

Man of the Match:
Joshua Furno (Italy)

Touch judges:
Jérôme Garcès (France)
Luke Pearce (England)
Television match official:
Geoff Warren (England)

Notes:

- Martin Castrogiovanni and Sergio Parisse earned their 104th caps for Italy, surpassing Andrea Lo Cicero on 103 as Italy's most-capped players.

22 February 2014
16:00 GMT (UTC+0)

England	13–10	Ireland
Try: Care 56' c Con: Farrell (1/1) 56'; Pen: Farrell (2/3) 24', 53'	Report	Try: R. Kearney 41' c Con: Sexton (1/1) 42'; Pen: Sexton (1/1) 49'

Twickenham Stadium, London
Attendance: 81,835
Referee: Craig Joubert (South Africa)

FB	15	Mike Brown
RW	14	Jack Nowell
OC	13	Luther Burrell
IC	12	Billy Twelvetrees
LW	11	Jonny May
FH	10	Owen Farrell
SH	9	Danny Care
N8	8	Billy Vunipola	(substituted off) 36'
OF	7	Chris Robshaw (c)
BF	6	Tom Wood	(substituted off) 69'
RL	5	Courtney Lawes
LL	4	Joe Launchbury
TP	3	David Wilson	(substituted off) 69'
HK	2	Dylan Hartley	(substituted off) 74'
LP	1	Joe Marler	(substituted off) 63'
Replacements:
HK	16	Tom Youngs	(substituted on) 74'
PR	17	Mako Vunipola	(substituted on) 63'
PR	18	Henry Thomas	(substituted on) 69'
LK	19	Dave Attwood	(substituted on) 69'
N8	20	Ben Morgan	(substituted on) 36'
SH	21	Lee Dickson
FH	22	George Ford
FB	23	Alex Goode
Coach:
Stuart Lancaster

FB	15	Rob Kearney
RW	14	Andrew Trimble	(substituted off) 65'
OC	13	Brian O'Driscoll	(substituted off) 79'
IC	12	Gordon D'Arcy
LW	11	David Kearney
FH	10	Johnny Sexton
SH	9	Conor Murray	(substituted off) 79'
N8	8	Jamie Heaslip
OF	7	Chris Henry	(substituted off) 73'
BF	6	Peter O'Mahony	(substituted off) 69'
RL	5	Paul O'Connell (c)
LL	4	Devin Toner
TP	3	Mike Ross	(substituted off) 61'
HK	2	Rory Best	(substituted off) 73'
LP	1	Cian Healy	(substituted off) 71'
Replacements:
HK	16	Seán Cronin	(substituted on) 73'
PR	17	Jack McGrath	(substituted on) 71'
PR	18	Martin Moore	(substituted on) 61'
LK	19	Iain Henderson	(substituted on) 69'
N8	20	Jordi Murphy	(substituted on) 73'
SH	21	Isaac Boss	(substituted on) 79'
FH	22	Paddy Jackson	(substituted on) 79'
WG	23	Fergus McFadden	(substituted on) 65'
Coach:
Joe Schmidt

Man of the Match:
Mike Brown (England)

Touch judges:
Romain Poite (France)
Leighton Hodges (Wales)
Television match official:
Jim Yuille (Scotland)

Notes:

- Jordi Murphy (Ireland) made his international debut.
- Ireland's Brian O'Driscoll drew level with Australia's George Gregan for the most caps in international rugby history, with 139. O'Driscoll has 131 caps with Ireland and eight with the British and Irish Lions.
- England retained the Millennium Trophy.

=== Round 4 ===
8 March 2014
14:30 GMT (UTC+0)

Ireland	46–7	Italy
Try: Sexton (2) 6' c, 59' m Trimble 37' c Healy 52' m Cronin 68' c McFadden 77' c McGrath 80' m Con: Sexton (2/4) 6', 39'; Jackson (2/3) 69', 77'; Pen: Sexton (1/1) 31'	Report	Try: Sarto 24' c Con: Orquera (1/1) 25'

Aviva Stadium, Dublin
Attendance: 52,000
Referee: Nigel Owens (Wales)

FB	15	Rob Kearney
RW	14	Andrew Trimble
OC	13	Brian O'Driscoll	(substituted off) 61'
IC	12	Gordon D'Arcy
LW	11	David Kearney
FH	10	Johnny Sexton	(substituted off) 63'
SH	9	Conor Murray	(substituted off) 16'
N8	8	Jamie Heaslip
OF	7	Chris Henry	(substituted off) 73'
BF	6	Iain Henderson	(substituted off) 53'
RL	5	Paul O'Connell (c)
LL	4	Devin Toner
TP	3	Mike Ross	(substituted off) 56'
HK	2	Rory Best	(substituted off) 54'
LP	1	Cian Healy	(substituted off) 53'
Replacements:
HK	16	Seán Cronin	(substituted on) 54'
PR	17	Jack McGrath	(substituted on) 53'
PR	18	Martin Moore	(substituted on) 56'
FL	19	Rhys Ruddock	(substituted on) 53'
FL	20	Jordi Murphy	(substituted on) 73'
SH	21	Eoin Reddan	(substituted on) 16'
FH	22	Paddy Jackson	(substituted on) 63'
WG	23	Fergus McFadden	(substituted on) 61'
Coach:
Joe Schmidt

FB	15	Luke McLean
RW	14	Angelo Esposito
OC	13	Michele Campagnaro
IC	12	Gonzalo Garcia	(substituted off) 63'
LW	11	Leonardo Sarto
FH	10	Luciano Orquera	(substituted off) 63'
SH	9	Tito Tebaldi	(substituted off) 70'
N8	8	Robert Barbieri
OF	7	Paul Derbyshire	(substituted off) 34'	(substituted on) 39'	(substituted off) 56'
BF	6	Joshua Furno
RL	5	Marco Bortolami (c)	(substituted off) 63'
LL	4	Quintin Geldenhuys
TP	3	Martin Castrogiovanni	(substituted off) 7'
HK	2	Leonardo Ghiraldini	(substituted off) 70'
LP	1	Alberto De Marchi	(substituted off) 56'	(substituted on) 70'
Replacements:
HK	16	Davide Giazzon	(substituted on) 70'
PR	17	Michele Rizzo	(substituted on) 56'
PR	18	Lorenzo Cittadini	(substituted on) 7'	(substituted off) 70'
LK	19	Antonio Pavanello	(substituted on) 63'
N8	20	Manoa Vosawai	(substituted on) 34'	(substituted off) 39'	(substituted on) 56'
SH	21	Edoardo Gori	(substituted on) 70'
FH	22	Tommaso Allan	(substituted on) 63'
FB	23	Andrea Masi	(substituted on) 63'
Coach:
Jacques Brunel

Man of the Match:
Brian O'Driscoll (Ireland)

Touch judges:
Pascal Gauzère (France)
Greg Garner (England)
Television match official:
Geoff Warren (England)

Notes:

- Brian O'Driscoll surpassed Australia's George Gregan for the most caps in international rugby history with 140 – 132 for Ireland, eight for the British and Irish Lions.
- With Sergio Parisse unselected for this match, Martin Castrogiovanni became Italy's most capped player with 105 caps.

8 March 2014
17:00 GMT (UTC+0)

Scotland	17–19	France
Try: Hogg 12' c Seymour 22' c Con: Laidlaw (2/2) 13', 22'; Pen: Laidlaw (0/1); Weir (1/2) 61'	Report	Try: Huget 45' c Con: Machenaud (1/1) 46'; Pen: Machenaud (3/4) 1', 10', 16'; Doussain (1/1) 78'

Murrayfield Stadium, Edinburgh
Attendance: 67,144
Referee: Chris Pollock (New Zealand)

FB	15	Stuart Hogg
RW	14	Tommy Seymour
OC	13	Alex Dunbar
IC	12	Matt Scott
LW	11	Sean Lamont	(substituted off) 29'
FH	10	Duncan Weir
SH	9	Greig Laidlaw
N8	8	David Denton
OF	7	Kelly Brown (c)
BF	6	Johnnie Beattie	(substituted off) 16'
RL	5	Jim Hamilton	(substituted off) 68'
LL	4	Richie Gray
TP	3	Geoff Cross
HK	2	Scott Lawson	(substituted off) 51'
LP	1	Ryan Grant
Replacements:
HK	16	Ross Ford	(substituted on) 51'
PR	17	Moray Low
PR	18	Euan Murray
LK	19	Tim Swinson	(substituted on) 68'
FL	20	Ryan Wilson	(substituted on) 16'
SH	21	Chris Cusiter
CE	22	Duncan Taylor
WG	23	Max Evans	(substituted on) 29'
Coach:
Scott Johnson

FB	15	Brice Dulin
RW	14	Yoann Huget
OC	13	Mathieu Bastareaud	(substituted off) 68'
IC	12	Maxime Mermoz
LW	11	Maxime Médard
FH	10	Jules Plisson	(substituted off) 47'
SH	9	Maxime Machenaud	(substituted off) 74'
N8	8	Damien Chouly
OF	7	Alexandre Lapandry
BF	6	Sébastien Vahaamahina	(substituted off) 66'
RL	5	Yoann Maestri	(substituted off) 59'
LL	4	Pascal Papé (c)
TP	3	Nicolas Mas	(substituted off) 59'
HK	2	Brice Mach	(substituted off) 47'
LP	1	Thomas Domingo	(substituted off) 68'
Replacements:
HK	16	Guilhem Guirado	(substituted on) 47'
PR	17	Vincent Debaty	(substituted on) 68'
PR	18	Rabah Slimani	(substituted on) 59'
LK	19	Alexandre Flanquart	(substituted on) 59'
N8	20	Antonie Claassen	(substituted on) 66'
SH	21	Jean-Marc Doussain	(substituted on) 74'
FH	22	Rémi Talès	(substituted on) 47'
CE	23	Gaël Fickou	(substituted on) 68'
Coach:
Philippe Saint-André

Man of the Match:
David Denton (Scotland)

Touch judges:
George Clancy (Ireland)
JP Doyle (England)
Television match official:
Gareth Simmonds (Wales)

9 March 2014
15:00 GMT (UTC+0)

England	29–18	Wales
Try: Care 4' c Burrell 33' c Con: Farrell (2/2) 5', 34'; Pen: Farrell (5/5) 18', 26', 45', 54', 58'	Report	Pen: Halfpenny (6/6) 8', 22', 30', 37', 40', 56'

Twickenham Stadium, London
Attendance: 81,641
Referee: Romain Poite (France)

FB	15	Mike Brown	(substituted off) 78'
RW	14	Jack Nowell
OC	13	Luther Burrell
IC	12	Billy Twelvetrees
LW	11	Jonny May
FH	10	Owen Farrell	(substituted off) 78'
SH	9	Danny Care	(substituted off) 78'
N8	8	Ben Morgan
OF	7	Chris Robshaw (c)
BF	6	Tom Wood	(substituted off) 78'
RL	5	Courtney Lawes
LL	4	Joe Launchbury	(substituted off) 72'
TP	3	David Wilson	(substituted off) 72'
HK	2	Dylan Hartley	(substituted off) 68'
LP	1	Joe Marler	(substituted off) 63'
Replacements:
HK	16	Tom Youngs	(substituted on) 68'
PR	17	Mako Vunipola	(substituted on) 63'
PR	18	Henry Thomas	(substituted on) 72'
LK	19	Dave Attwood	(substituted on) 72'
FL	20	Tom Johnson	(substituted on) 78'
SH	21	Lee Dickson	(substituted on) 78'
FH	22	George Ford	(substituted on) 78'
FB	23	Alex Goode	(substituted on) 78'
Coach:
Stuart Lancaster

FB	15	Leigh Halfpenny		(substituted off) 74'
RW	14	Alex Cuthbert
OC	13	Jonathan Davies
IC	12	Jamie Roberts
LW	11	George North
FH	10	Rhys Priestland		(substituted off) 61'
SH	9	Rhys Webb		(substituted off) 52'
N8	8	Taulupe Faletau
OF	7	Sam Warburton (c)
BF	6	Dan Lydiate		(substituted off) 72'
RL	5	Alun Wyn Jones
LL	4	Jake Ball		(substituted off) 72'
TP	3	Adam Jones		(substituted off) 66'
HK	2	Richard Hibbard		(substituted off) 54'
LP	1	Gethin Jenkins	(yellow card) 53'	(substituted off) 63'
Replacements:
HK	16	Ken Owens		(substituted on) 54'
PR	17	Paul James		(substituted on) 63'
PR	18	Rhodri Jones		(substituted on) 66'
LK	19	Andrew Coombs		(substituted on) 72'
FL	20	Justin Tipuric		(substituted on) 72'
SH	21	Mike Phillips		(substituted on) 52'
FH	22	Dan Biggar		(substituted on) 61'
FB	23	Liam Williams		(substituted on) 74'
Coach:
Warren Gatland

Man of the Match:
Courtney Lawes (England)

Touch judges:
Steve Walsh (Australia)
Lourens van der Merwe (South Africa)
Television match official:
Simon McDowell (Ireland)

Notes:

- George Ford made his international debut for England.
- Wales' Gethin Jenkins drew level with Stephen Jones as the most-capped Welsh player with 104 caps.
- England won the Triple Crown for the first time since 2003.

=== Round 5 ===
15 March 2014
13:30 CET (UTC+1)

Italy	11–52	England
Try: Sarto 68' m Con: Allan (0/1); Pen: Orquera (2/2) 6', 22'	Report	Try: Brown (2) 12' c, 37' c Farrell 31' c Nowell 52' c Vunipola 60' c Tuilagi 67' c Robshaw 80+1' c Con: Farrell (7/7) 13', 32', 39', 53', 61', 67', 80+2'; Pen: Farrell (1/1) 10'

Stadio Olimpico, Rome
Attendance: 71,257
Referee: Pascal Gaüzère (France)

FB	15	Luke McLean
RW	14	Angelo Esposito
OC	13	Michele Campagnaro
IC	12	Gonzalo Garcia		(substituted off) 72'
LW	11	Leonardo Sarto
FH	10	Luciano Orquera		(substituted off) 43'
SH	9	Tito Tebaldi		(substituted off) 66'
N8	8	Sergio Parisse (c)
OF	7	Robert Barbieri
BF	6	Joshua Furno		(substituted off) 55'
RL	5	Marco Bortolami	(yellow card) 50'
LL	4	Quintin Geldenhuys
TP	3	Lorenzo Cittadini		(substituted off) 46'	(substituted on) 74'
HK	2	Leonardo Ghiraldini
LP	1	Matías Agüero		(substituted off) 46'
Replacements:
HK	16	Davide Giazzon
PR	17	Michele Rizzo		(substituted on) 46'	(substituted off) 74'
PR	18	Alberto De Marchi		(substituted on) 46'
LK	19	George Biagi			(substituted on) 61'
FL	20	Paul Derbyshire		(substituted on) 55'	(substituted off) 61'
SH	21	Edoardo Gori		(substituted on) 66'
FH	22	Tommaso Allan		(substituted on) 43'
FB	23	Andrea Masi		(substituted on) 72'
Coach:
Jacques Brunel

FB	15	Mike Brown
RW	14	Jack Nowell
OC	13	Luther Burrell	(substituted off) 53'
IC	12	Billy Twelvetrees	(substituted off) 70'
LW	11	Jonny May
FH	10	Owen Farrell
SH	9	Danny Care	(substituted off) 66'
N8	8	Ben Morgan
OF	7	Chris Robshaw (c)
BF	6	Tom Wood	(substituted off) 66'
RL	5	Courtney Lawes
LL	4	Joe Launchbury	(substituted off) 70'
TP	3	David Wilson	(substituted off) 70'
HK	2	Dylan Hartley	(substituted off) 53'
LP	1	Mako Vunipola	(substituted off) 75'
Replacements:
HK	16	Tom Youngs	(substituted on) 53'
PR	17	Matt Mullan	(substituted on) 75'
PR	18	Henry Thomas	(substituted on) 70'
LK	19	Dave Attwood	(substituted on) 70'
FL	20	Tom Johnson	(substituted on) 66'
SH	21	Lee Dickson	(substituted on) 66'
FH	22	George Ford	(substituted on) 70'
CE	23	Manu Tuilagi	(substituted on) 53'
Coach:
Stuart Lancaster

Man of the Match:
Mike Brown (England)

Touch judges:
Nigel Owens (Wales)
Leighton Hodges (Wales)
Television match official:
Simon McDowell (Ireland)

Notes:

- George Biagi made his international debut for Italy.
- With Martin Castrogiovanni unselected for this match, Sergio Parisse joined Castrogiovanni as the most capped Italian rugby player with 105 caps.

15 March 2014
14:45 GMT (UTC+0)

Wales	51–3	Scotland
Try: L. Williams 15' c North (2) 33' c, 41' m Roberts (2) 38' c, 47' c Faletau 52' m R. Williams 73' c Con: Biggar (4/6) 15', 23', 39', 48'; Hook (1/1) 74'; Pen: Biggar (2/2) 8', 23'	Report	Pen: Laidlaw (1/3) 3'

Millennium Stadium, Cardiff
Attendance: 73,547
Referee: Jérôme Garcès (France)

FB	15	Liam Williams	(substituted off) 62'
RW	14	Alex Cuthbert
OC	13	Jonathan Davies
IC	12	Jamie Roberts
LW	11	George North
FH	10	Dan Biggar	(substituted off) 62'
SH	9	Mike Phillips	(substituted off) 53'
N8	8	Taulupe Faletau
OF	7	Sam Warburton (c)
BF	6	Dan Lydiate	(substituted off) 53'
RL	5	Alun Wyn Jones
LL	4	Luke Charteris	(substituted off) 62'
TP	3	Rhodri Jones	(substituted off) 57'
HK	2	Ken Owens	(substituted off) 57'
LP	1	Gethin Jenkins	(substituted off) 57'
Replacements:
HK	16	Richard Hibbard	(substituted on) 57'
PR	17	Paul James	(substituted on) 57'
PR	18	Adam Jones	(substituted on) 57'
LK	19	Jake Ball	(substituted on) 62'
FL	20	Justin Tipuric	(substituted on) 53'
SH	21	Rhodri Williams	(substituted on) 53'
FH	22	Rhys Priestland	(substituted on) 62'
FH	23	James Hook	(substituted on) 62'
Coach:
Warren Gatland

FB	15	Stuart Hogg	(red card) 22'
RW	14	Dougie Fife		(substituted off) 66'
OC	13	Alex Dunbar
IC	12	Matt Scott
LW	11	Max Evans
FH	10	Duncan Weir
SH	9	Greig Laidlaw		(substituted off) 61'
N8	8	David Denton
OF	7	Kelly Brown (c)		(substituted off) 8'
BF	6	Ryan Wilson
RL	5	Jim Hamilton		(substituted off) 54'
LL	4	Richie Gray
TP	3	Geoff Cross		(substituted off) 40'
HK	2	Scott Lawson		(substituted off) 45'
LP	1	Ryan Grant		(substituted off) 45'
Replacements:
HK	16	Ross Ford		(substituted on) 45'
PR	17	Alasdair Dickinson		(substituted on) 45'
PR	18	Euan Murray		(substituted on) 40'
LK	19	Tim Swinson		(substituted on) 54'
FL	20	Alasdair Strokosch		(substituted on) 8'
SH	21	Chris Cusiter		(substituted on) 61'
FH	22	Duncan Taylor		(substituted on) 66'
FB	23	Jack Cuthbert
Coach:
Scott Johnson

Man of the Match:
Liam Williams (Wales)

Touch judges:
Chris Pollock (New Zealand)
Greg Garner (England)
Television match official:
Graham Hughes (England)

Notes

- This was Scott Johnson's final match in charge of Scotland, before being replaced by Vern Cotter.
- Gethin Jenkins surpassed Stephen Jones as the most-capped Welsh player with 105 caps.
- This was Wales' biggest winning margin over Scotland. It was previously the 46–22 victory at Murrayfield during the 2005 Six Nations Championship.
- Stuart Hogg's red card was the third of the 2014 tournament, but only the third since Scott Murray was sent off when playing for Scotland against Wales in 2006.

15 March 2014
18:00 CET (UTC+1)

France	20–22	Ireland
Try: Dulin 30' c Szarzewski 62' c Con: Machenaud (2/2) 31', 63'; Pen: Machenaud (2/2) 1', 14'; Doussain (0/1)	Report	Try: Sexton (2) 20' m, 46' c Trimble 25' c Con: Sexton (2/3) 26', 47'; Pen: Sexton (1/2) 52'

Stade de France, Saint-Denis
Attendance: 78,337
Referee: Steve Walsh (Australia)

FB	15	Brice Dulin
RW	14	Yoann Huget
OC	13	Mathieu Bastareaud
IC	12	Gaël Fickou	(substituted off) 75'
LW	11	Maxime Médard
FH	10	Rémi Talès
SH	9	Maxime Machenaud	(substituted off) 66'
N8	8	Damien Chouly
OF	7	Alexandre Lapandry	(substituted off) 75'
BF	6	Louis Picamoles	(substituted off) 66'
RL	5	Yoann Maestri	(substituted off) 53'
LL	4	Pascal Papé (c)
TP	3	Nicolas Mas	(substituted off) 36'
HK	2	Dimitri Szarzewski	(substituted off) 68'
LP	1	Thomas Domingo	(substituted off) 40'
Replacements:
HK	16	Guilhem Guirado	(substituted on) 68'
PR	17	Vincent Debaty	(substituted on) 40'
PR	18	Rabah Slimani	(substituted on) 36'
LK	19	Alexandre Flanquart	(substituted on) 53'
LK	20	Sébastien Vahaamahina	(substituted on) 66'
FL	21	Wenceslas Lauret	(substituted on) 75'
SH	22	Jean-Marc Doussain	(substituted on) 66'
CE	23	Maxime Mermoz	(substituted on) 75'
Coach:
Philippe Saint-André

FB	15	Rob Kearney
RW	14	Andrew Trimble
OC	13	Brian O'Driscoll
IC	12	Gordon D'Arcy	(substituted off) 66'
LW	11	David Kearney
FH	10	Johnny Sexton	(substituted off) 68'
SH	9	Conor Murray	(substituted off) 63'
N8	8	Jamie Heaslip
OF	7	Chris Henry
BF	6	Peter O'Mahony	(substituted off) 63'
RL	5	Paul O'Connell (c)
LL	4	Devin Toner
TP	3	Mike Ross	(substituted off) 63'
HK	2	Rory Best	(substituted off) 70'
LP	1	Cian Healy	(substituted off) 70'
Replacements:
HK	16	Seán Cronin	(substituted on) 70'
PR	17	Jack McGrath	(substituted on) 70'
PR	18	Martin Moore	(substituted on) 63'
LK	19	Iain Henderson	(substituted on) 63'
FL	20	Jordi Murphy
SH	21	Eoin Reddan	(substituted on) 63'
FH	22	Ian Madigan	(substituted on) 68'
WG	23	Fergus McFadden	(substituted on) 66'
Coach:
Joe Schmidt

Man of the Match:
Brian O'Driscoll (Ireland)

Touch judges:
Wayne Barnes (England)
Marius Mitrea (Italy)
Television match official:
Gareth Simmonds (Wales)

Notes:

- This was the final Test match for Brian O'Driscoll, who had previously announced his retirement effective at the end of the 2013–14 season.
- This game was the deciding game of the 2014 Six Nations Championship:
- If the game were drawn, or if France won by less than 70 points, England would win the Championship.
- If France won by 71 points or more, they would win the Championship. If they won by exactly 70, it would be decided on whichever team (France or England) had score more tries.
- Ireland won; sealing the title for the first time in 5 years.

== Statistics ==
=== Points scorers ===
Pos	Name	Team	Pts
1	Johnny Sexton	Ireland	66
2	Owen Farrell	England	64
3	Leigh Halfpenny	Wales	51
4	Jean-Marc Doussain	France	27
5	Maxime Machenaud	France	26
6	Tommaso Allan	Italy	21
7	Mike Brown	England	20
8	Greig Laidlaw	Scotland	19
9	Danny Care	England	16
10	Luther Burrell	England	15
10	Yoann Huget	France	15
10	George North	Wales	15
10	Andrew Trimble	Ireland	15

=== Try scorers ===
Pos	Name	Team	Tries
1	Mike Brown	England	4
1	Johnny Sexton	Ireland	4
3	Luther Burrell	England	3
3	Yoann Huget	France	3
3	George North	Wales	3
3	Andrew Trimble	Ireland	3
7	Michele Campagnaro	Italy	2
7	Danny Care	England	2
7	Alex Dunbar	Scotland	2
7	Rob Kearney	Ireland	2
7	Jamie Roberts	Wales	2
7	Leonardo Sarto	Italy	2

== Media coverage ==
In the United Kingdom, BBC One televised all the matches live. There was a forum show on the BBC Red Button for satellite and cable viewers after several matches. Wales matches were televised live in Welsh on S4C.

Elsewhere, the tournament's matches were televised live by France Télévisions in France, RTÉ in Ireland and DMAX in Italy in the first year of a four-year contract.
