= Tommaso Allan =

Italy international rugby union player

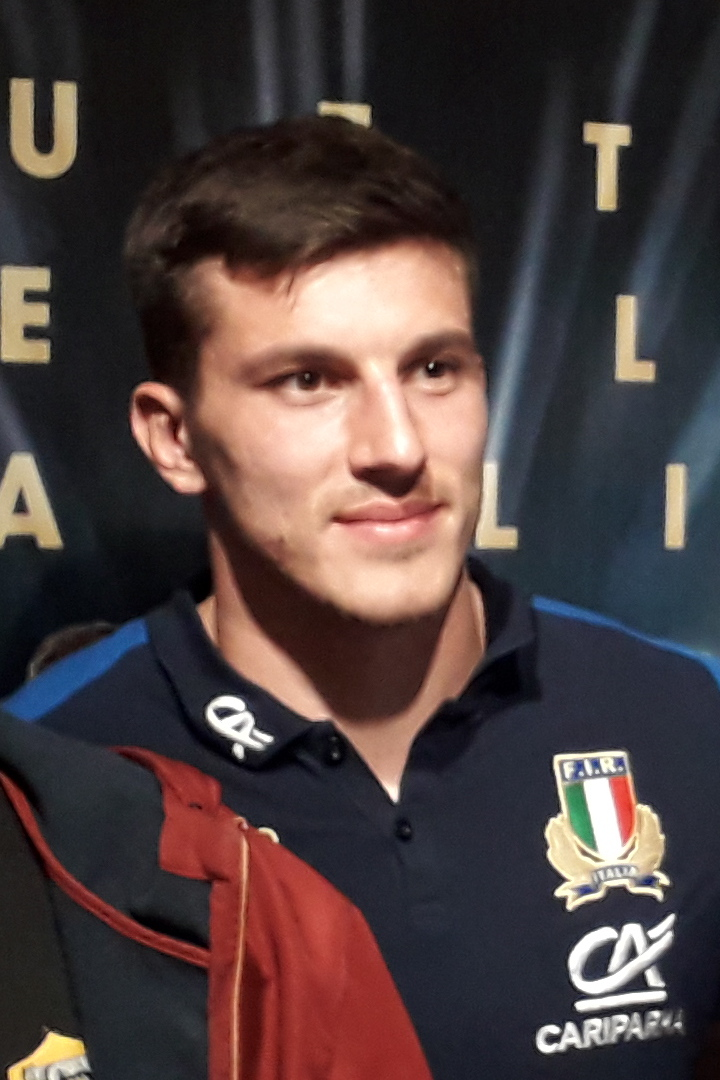
- Allan during a Six Nations event, March 2018
- Born: 26 April 1993 (age 33) Vicenza, Italy
- Height: 184 cm (6 ft 0 in)
- Weight: 87 kg (192 lb; 13 st 10 lb)
- School: Royal Grammar School, High Wycombe, European School, Culham
- Notable relative: John Allan (uncle)

Rugby union career
- Position(s): Fly-half, full-back
- Current team: Zebre Parma
Senior career
| Years | Team | Apps | (Points) |
| 2013–2016 | Perpignan | 41 | (150) |
| 2016–2021 | Benetton | 66 | (378) |
| 2021−2023 | Harlequins | 36 | (138) |
| 2023−2026 | Perpignan | 54 | (445) |
| 2026− | Zebre Parma | | |
- Correct as of 9 Aug 2026
International career
| Years | Team | Apps | (Points) |
| 2012–2013 | Scotland U20 | 16 | (89) |
| 2013– | Italy | 91 | (564) |
- Correct as of 9 Aug 2026

Tommaso "Tommy" Allan (/ˈælən/; born 26 April 1993) is an Italian professional rugby union player who plays for Zebre Parma in URC, primarily as a fly-half. He represents Italy at international level, having made his test debut against Australia during the 2013 Autumn Internationals. Allan previously played for Harlequins, Benetton, and Perpignan.

== Early life & youth rugby ==
Allan was coached at Henley RFC from the age of 8 until 15, representing the Henley age groups through that period. Later he was part of the London Wasps Academy in 2011 before captaining the RGS High Wycombe rugby side. He won the Under-19 Provincial Championship while playing for Western Province in South Africa, and at the end of his contract there he joined Perpignan.

== Club career ==
Allan signed for French Top 14 side Perpignan shortly before the 2013–14 season. Allan made his debut for Perpignan on 8 September 2013 against Racing Métro at Stade Olympique Yves-du-Manoir in the Hauts-de-Seine, Paris. Perpignan lost 19–16, with Allan kicking one conversion (56th minute) and kicking three penalties (3rd minute, 26th minute, 68th minute).

Because of Allan's end-of-year performances, he was called up to the national team. Allan played a total of eight games in the Top 14 and four in the Heineken Cup in his debut season for Perpignan, scoring a total of 27 points in 12 appearances for the side. Perpignan were relegated to the Pro D2 after finishing 13th out of the 14 teams.

In the 2014–15 Pro D2 season, Allan cemented a firm position on the number 10 role for Perpignan. Playing eighteen games, scoring three tries, fourteen penalty goals, scoring a total of 81 points and helping Perpignan to reach promotional play-offs.

Allan returned to his home region of Veneto, Italy, signing for Benetton Treviso before the 2016–17 Pro12 until 2020–21 Pro14 season.

It was announced on 5 May 2021, that Allan had been signed by the English Premiership team Harlequins, to begin his career with them ahead of the 2021/22 season.

== International career ==
On 9 October 2013 Allan was named in the Italian 35-man training squad for the 2013 end-of-year rugby union tests, which led to the Scottish Rugby Union seeking clarity on Allan's intentions for his future. Despite Allan playing for Scotland at Under 17, Under 18 and Under 20 age groups, he was named in Jacques Brunel's final squad. He made his debut coming off the bench to score against Australia.

Allan started the first three of Italy's 2014 Six Nations matches against Wales, France and Scotland.

On 24 August 2015, he was named in the final 31-man squad for the 2015 Rugby World Cup and on 18 August 2019, he was named in the final 31-man squad for the 2019 Rugby World Cup.

On 22 August 2023, he was named in the Italy's 33-man squad for the 2023 Rugby World Cup. On 4 February 2024, he became the best Italian points and try scorer in the Six Nations Championship, surpassing Domínguez

== Personal life ==
Allan hails from a rugby family; his Scottish father William Allan and his Italian mother Paola Berlato both played in Italy, while his uncle John Allan earned 9 caps for Scotland and 13 for South Africa. Through his father he was eligible to represent Scotland, but chose to play for Italy at senior level. He went to the European School in Culham, then graduated in economics in London before earning a master's degree in marketing and business in Italy.

== Statistics ==
=== List of international test tries ===
As of 16 March 2026

| Try | Opposing team | Location | Venue | Competition | Date | Result | Score |
|---|---|---|---|---|---|---|---|
| 1 | Australia | Turin, Italy | Stadio Olimpico di Torino | 2013 end-of-year rugby union internationals | 9 November 2013 | Loss | 20 – 50 |
| 2 | Scotland | Rome, Italy | Stadio Olimpico | 2014 Six Nations | 22 February 2014 | Loss | 20 – 21 |
| 3 | Romania | Exeter, England | Sandy Park | 2015 Rugby World Cup | 11 October 2015 | Win | 32 – 22 |
| 4 | Tonga | Padova, Italy | Stadio Euganeo | 2016 end-of-year rugby union international | 26 November 2016 | Loss | 17 – 19 |
| 5 | Ireland | Dublin, Ireland | Aviva Stadium | 2018 Six Nations | 10 February 2018 | Loss | 56 – 19 |
| 6 | Scotland | Rome, Italy | Stadio Olimpico | 2018 Six Nations | 17 March 2018 | Loss | 27 – 29 |
| 7 | Scotland | Rome, Italy | Stadio Olimpico | 2018 Six Nations | 17 March 2018 | Loss | 27 – 29 |
| 8 | Georgia | Florence, Italy | Stadio Artemio Franchi | 2018 end-of-year rugby union internationals | 10 November 2018 | Win | 28 – 17 |
| 9 | England | London, England | Twickenham Stadium | 2019 Six Nations | 9 March 2019 | Loss | 57 – 14 |
| 10 | Russia | San Benedetto del Tronto, Italy | Stadio Riviera delle Palme | 2019 Rugby World Cup warm-up matches | 17 August 2019 | Win | 85 – 15 |
| 11 | Namibia | Osaka, Japan | Hanazono Rugby Stadium | 2019 Rugby World Cup | 22 September 2019 | Win | 47 – 22 |
| 12 | England | London, England | Twickenham Stadium | 2021 Six Nations | 13 February 2021 | Loss | 41 – 18 |
| 13 | Romania | Bucharest, Romania | Stadionul Arcul de Triumf | 2022 July Internationals | 1 July 2022 | Win | 13 – 45 |
| 14 | Scotland | Edinburgh, Scotland | Murrayfield Stadium | 2023 Six Nations | 18 March 2023 | Loss | 26 – 14 |
| 15 | England | Rome, Italy | Stadio Olimpico | 2024 Six Nations | 4 February 2024 | Loss | 24 - 27 |
| 16 | Wales | Cardiff, Wales | Millennium Stadium | 2026 Six Nations | 14 March 2026 | Loss | 31 - 17 |
