= Leigh Halfpenny =

Welsh rugby union player (born 1988)

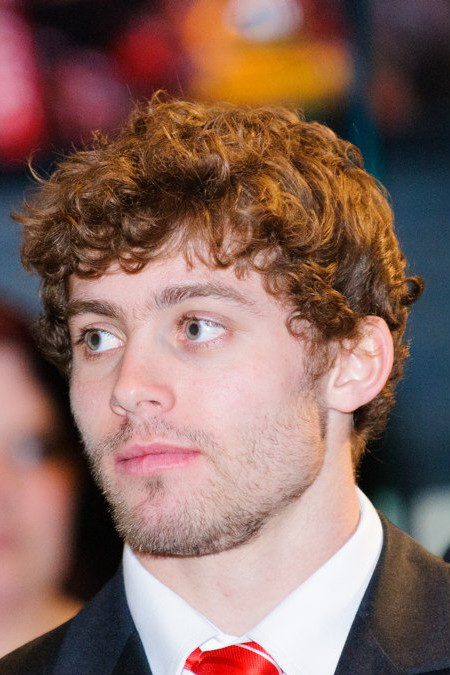
- Halfpenny in 2012
- Born: Stephen Leigh Halfpenny; 22 December 1988 (age 37) Swansea, Wales
- Height: 1.78 m (5 ft 10 in)
- Weight: 85 kg (187 lb; 13 st 5 lb)

Rugby union career
- Position(s): Fullback; Wing
Senior career
| Years | Team | Apps | (Points) |
| 2006 | Neath | 2 | (0) |
| 2007–2008 | Cardiff RFC | 21 | (184) |
| 2008–2014 | Cardiff Blues | 87 | (568) |
| 2014–2017 | Toulon | 40 | (544) |
| 2017–2023 | Scarlets | 56 | (519) |
| 2023–2024 | Crusaders | 1 | (2) |
| 2024–2025 | Harlequins | 11 | (15) |
| 2025–2026 | Cardiff Rugby | 3 | (2) |
- Correct as of 25 September 2025
International career
| Years | Team | Apps | (Points) |
- Wales U16
- Wales U18
| 2007 | Wales U19 | 5 | (57) |
| 2008 | Wales U20 | 9 | (90) |
| 2008–2023 | Wales | 101 | (801) |
| 2009, 2013, 2017 | British & Irish Lions | 4 | (49) |

Stephen Leigh Halfpenny (born 22 December 1988) is a Welsh former rugby union professional rugby union player. He played fullback or wing for Cardiff in the United Rugby Championship. Halfpenny is the third highest points scorer for Wales after Neil Jenkins and Stephen Jones.

== Early life ==
Halfpenny is from Gorseinon, in Swansea. He attended Pontybrenin Primary School and Penyrheol Comprehensive School.

== Early career ==
A winger or fullback, Halfpenny was signed as a youth by the Ospreys and played the 2005–06 season with the Ospreys U18s. Halfpenny then trained with Neath RFC during the 2006–07 season, before signing for the Cardiff Blues and spending the whole 2007–08 season playing for feeder club Cardiff RFC, before making his regional debut against Ulster at the Ravenhill Stadium in May 2008, scoring three conversions in the 17–26 victory.

== Club career ==
=== Cardiff Blues ===
On 18 April 2009, Halfpenny scored two tries for the Cardiff Blues in the final of the EDF Energy Cup, a 50–12 win over Gloucester at Twickenham. In January 2014 Halfpenny announced that he would be leaving the Blues at the end of the 2013–14 season after signing a two-year deal with the French team Toulon.

Halfpenny did not complete the 2013–14 season due to receiving a dislocated shoulder in the RBS Six Nations match against England. Thus, his final match with the Blues was against Exeter Chiefs on 18 January, where the Blues lost 13–19. Halfpenny contributed a conversion and two penalties to the game.

=== Toulon ===
On 16 September 2014, Toulon president Mourad Boudjellal said that he may terminate Halfpenny's contract due to reoccurring injury problems, though this was later resolved. Halfpenny finally made his Toulon debut on 12 October 2014, two months after the start of the Top 14 season.

On 2 May 2015, Halfpenny scored 14 points in the 2015 European Rugby Champions Cup Final as Toulon beat Clermont to claim record third successive European title.

=== Scarlets ===
On 3 August 2017, Halfpenny returned home to Wales to sign for regional team Scarlets on a three-year contract, which is a National Dual Contract with the Welsh Rugby Union, from the 2017–18 season.

=== Crusaders ===
Halfpenny had continued to play for Scarlets until the end of the 2023 season, when it was announced he had signed for New Zealand side Crusaders, for the 2024 Super Rugby Pacific season. Halfpenny only featured in one Super rugby game after injuring himself in pre season by tearing his pectoral muscle. He was the club's 290th player, when he was substituted on to miss a penalty but convert a try.

=== Harlequins ===
On 31 July 2024, it was announced he had signed for Harlequins ahead of the 2024-25 Premiership season. He scored a try against Newcastle Falcons on his home debut for the club as they won 28–14. He left the club after one season.

=== Return to Cardiff ===
In September 2025, it was announced that Halfpenny had signed a short-term contract with Cardiff Rugby, taking on the role of kicking coach with the intention of returning to play after he is fully recovered from a calf injury.

In December 2025, it was announced that Halfpenny was fit for selection, and could be available for the Challenge Cup match against Ulster. Halfpenny was selected to play against Ulster, and would make his first Cardiff Rugby appearance in 4,347 days. He played until the 57th minute. Halfpenny kicked a successful conversion of George Nott's try.

== International career ==
=== Wales ===
==== 2008–11 ====
As a former Wales Under-20 international, Halfpenny received his first call-up for the Wales senior national team in October 2008 ahead of the 2008 Autumn internationals. He made his debut in the first game of the autumn series against world champions South Africa on 8 November 2008, at the age of 19. He scored his first points from a penalty kick in the 20–15 loss. He went on to score his first two tries on his second cap against Canada a week later.

Halfpenny was selected on the right wing for Wales' 2009 Six Nations game against Scotland, on 8 February, and again on 14 February, against rivals England. He scored a try in each match and kicked a penalty against England to add to that. His points proved to be the difference between the two teams. He then played against France in a match that Wales lost 21–16 in Saint-Denis. Warren Gatland then dropped Halfpenny for the 20–15 win over Italy, as Warren Gatland experimented with winger Mark Jones.

Halfpenny was a key part of the Wales squad for the following two campaigns but he was constantly plagued by injury. Coach Warren Gatland had faith in Halfpenny, and the Blues winger did enough to force his way into the squad for the 2011 World Cup. During the World Cup, Halfpenny impressed in many positions, particularly at fullback. It was also in this game that Halfpenny became first choice kicker, ahead of fly-halves Rhys Priestland and James Hook. In the semi-final against France, Halfpenny attempted a 47-yard penalty that would have taken Wales to the final. However, the kick fell just short.

==== 2012–2023 ====
During the 2012 Six Nations, Halfpenny cemented his place at fullback and became one of the standout players of the tournament, finishing as top point scorer of the tournament. Some of his points came at crucial points within the tournament. Down 21–20 to Ireland in the 80th minutes, Halfpenny sent a penalty over to give Wales a 23–21 win over the hosts, and subsequently completed another four penalties and a conversion as Wales toppled England. Then, in the final match against France, Wales got a 16–9 win, with Halfpenny converting three further penalties and a conversion. In the final match of the 2012 Winter Test series against Australia, Halfpenny suffered a neck injury while attempting to stop the winning try. He was taken to hospital but was discharged the next day without any serious damage. Halfpenny was named man of the match.

In the first match of the 2013 Six Nations Championship, Halfpenny scored the 2nd try for Wales in their 30–22 loss to Ireland at the Millennium Stadium. The following week he earned the man of the match award when Wales beat France 16–6 in Paris. Again two weeks later in Rome when Wales beat Italy 26–9, he was made Man of the Match by the Italian broadcaster. With over 80,000 people voting between 15 shortlisted 2013 Six Nations players, Halfpenny was also named player of the tournament, securing 40% of the overall vote. In November 2013 Halfpenny was named in a shortlist of five players for the IRB Player of the Year. In December 2013 Halfpenny was selected as BBC Wales Sports Personality of the Year and was runner-up for BBC Sports Personality of the Year to Andy Murray.

In March 2014, Halfpenny was ruled out for the rest of the season after he dislocated his right shoulder in the 29–18 defeat to England in the 2014 Six Nations Championship. In October 2014, Halfpenny was included in the 34-man squad for the 2014 Autumn internationals against Australia, Fiji, New Zealand and South Africa. He scored 27 points during the Autumn series including all 12 of Wales's points in a famous win over South Africa, only the second in their history.

In September 2015 Halfpenny was ruled out of the Rugby World Cup after rupturing an anterior cruciate knee ligament during Wales' 23–19 warm up win over Italy at the Millennium Stadium.

In 2021, in a Wales match against Canada, he earned his 96th cap for Wales and, with four Lions caps, his 100th international cap, but a knee injury in the first minute put him out of the game.

Halfpenny announced his retirement from International Rugby in October 2023, and his final match was Wales v Barbarians on 4 November of that year.

=== Lions ===
Halfpenny was included in the British & Irish Lions squad for their 2009 tour to South Africa. He missed the start of the Lions tour due to a thigh injury requiring treatment, but once fit he rejoined Ian McGeechan's Lions squad in South Africa on 2 June. He played in the tour match against Free State Cheetahs on 6 June. However, Halfpenny then withdrew from the Lions squad due to a recurrence of the thigh injury.

Halfpenny was selected for the 2013 British & Irish Lions tour to Australia as one of three fullbacks touring along with Stuart Hogg and Rob Kearney. Halfpenny played all three tests, winning player of the series, and breaking the Lions points record held by Neil Jenkins. He also broke the Lions record for most points in one test.

=== International tries ===
| Try | Opponent | Location | Venue | Competition | Date | Result |
|---|---|---|---|---|---|---|
| 1 | Canada | Cardiff, Wales | Millennium Stadium | 2008 Autumn Internationals | 14 November 2008 | Win |
| 2 | Scotland | Edinburgh, Scotland | Murrayfield | 2009 Six Nations | 8 February 2009 | Win |
| 3 | England | Cardiff, Wales | Millennium Stadium | 2009 Six Nations | 14 February 2009 | Win |
| 4 | Samoa | Cardiff, Wales | Millennium Stadium | 2009 Autumn Internationals | 13 November 2009 | Win |
| 5 | Scotland | Cardiff, Wales | Millennium Stadium | 2010 Six Nations | 13 February 2010 | Win |
| 6 | France | Cardiff, Wales | Millennium Stadium | 2010 Six Nations | 26 February 2010 | Loss |
| 7 | Fiji | Hamilton, New Zealand | Waikato Stadium | 2011 Rugby World Cup | 2 October 2011 | Win |
| 8 | Australia | Auckland, New Zealand | Eden Park | 2011 Rugby World Cup | 21 October 2011 | Loss |
| 9 | Scotland | Cardiff, Wales | Millennium Stadium | 2012 Six Nations | 12 February 2012 | Win |
| 10 | Scotland | Cardiff, Wales | Millennium Stadium | 2012 Six Nations | 12 February 2012 | Win |
| 11 | Ireland | Cardiff, Wales | Millennium Stadium | 2013 Six Nations | 2 February 2013 | Loss |
| 12 | Scotland | Cardiff, Wales | Millennium Stadium | 2018 Six Nations | 3 February 2018 | Win |
| 13 | Scotland | Cardiff, Wales | Millennium Stadium | 2018 Six Nations | 3 February 2018 | Win |
| 14 | France | Paris, France | Stade de France | 2020 Autumn Internationals | 24 October 2020 | Loss |

== Professional points record ==
As of 15 March 2015

| Team | Caps | Tries | Conversions | Penalties | Drop goals | Total points |
|---|---|---|---|---|---|---|
| Toulon | 10 | 1 | 21 | 24 | 1 | 119 |
| Cardiff Blues | 87 | 21 | 41 | 127 | 0 | 568 |
| Wales | 59 | 12 | 34 | 116 | 0 | 476 |
| British & Irish Lions (test matches) | 4 | 0 | 5 | 13 | 0 | 49 |
| British & Irish Lions (tour matches) | 4 | 3 | 16 | 6 | 0 | 65 |
| Total | 163 | 37 | 112 | 267 | 1 | 1210 |

== Coaching career ==
In June 2025, following his departure from Harlequins as a player, Halfpenny joined the Wales coaching setup as a skills coach for the 2025 summer tour of Japan. During the tour, Wales ended their 18 match losing streak with a 31–22 victory against Japan in the second test.

Ahead of the 2026 Nations Championship, Halfpenny was announced as an interim kicking coach for Wales. He will be a part of the coaching squad for the matches against Fiji, Argentina, and South Africa.

Cardiff Rugby announced in July 2026 that Halfpenny would remain at the club as kicking coach and academy skills coach after retiring at the end of the 2025-26 season.
