= Dave Kearney =

Irish rugby union player

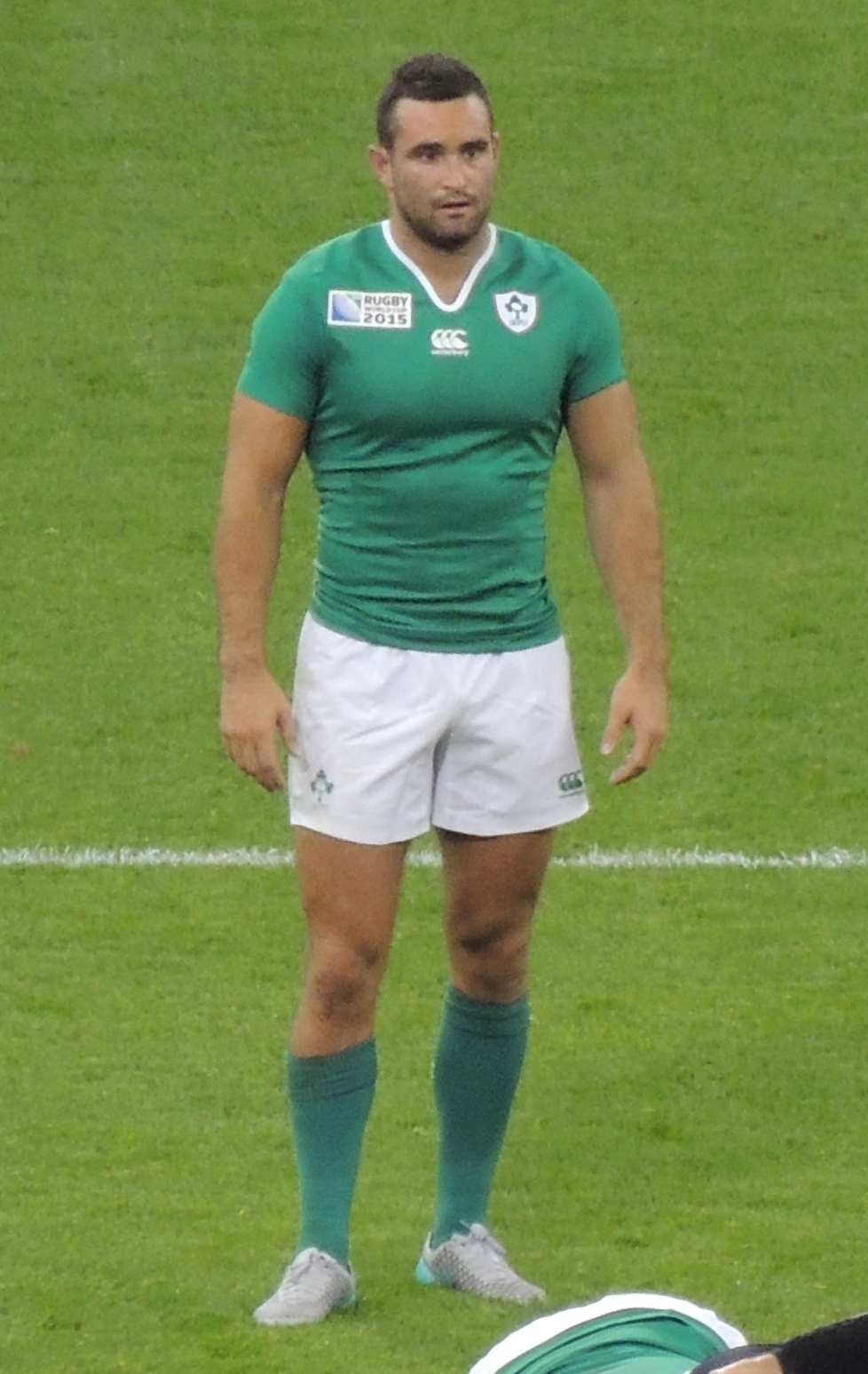
- Kearney playing for Ireland during the 2015 Rugby World Cup
- Born: 19 June 1989 (age 37) Dundalk, Ireland
- Height: 1.80 m (5 ft 11 in)
- Weight: 90 kg (14 st; 200 lb)
- School: Clongowes Wood College
- University: University College Dublin
- Notable relative: Rob Kearney (brother) Joe Biden (fifth cousin)

Rugby union career
- Position: Wing
Amateur team(s)
Years	Team	Apps	(Points)
- Lansdowne
Senior career
Years	Team	Apps	(Points)
2009–2023	Leinster	186	(275)
2023–2024	Chicago Hounds	9	(0)
- Correct as of 14 May 2025
International career
Years	Team	Apps	(Points)
2008–2009	Ireland U20	17	(30)
2013	Emerging Ireland	3	(5)
2011–2012	Ireland Wolfhounds	2	(5)
2013–2019	Ireland	19	(25)
- Correct as of 9 December 2020

Dave Kearney (born 19 June 1989), is an Irish former rugby union player who played wing and fullback for Lansdowne, Leinster and Ireland. He attended Clongowes Wood College. Kearney's older brother, Rob, formerly started at fullback for Leinster and the Ireland national rugby union team.

Kearney is a seventh cousin of former U.S. President Joe Biden.

== Career ==
=== Leinster ===
Kearney played his first match for Leinster on 16 May 2009 against the Newport Dragons entering the match as a substitute. He scored his first try in a Leinster jersey playing against the Newport Gwent Dragons in December of the 2009–10 season, one of three matches he played that season. In Kearney's third season with Leinster he scored four tries in 13 Celtic League matches during the 2010–11 season. On 12 March 2021 Kearney scored a hat-trick in a win against Zebre in the Pro14, bringing his try tally for Leinster over 50 to 51. Following a strong season in the Championship, Kearney was named to his first Pro14 Dream Team following the 2020–21 campaign. In May 2023 Kearney announced that he would leave Leinster at the end of the season following 14 years at the province.

=== Ireland ===
Kearney has 17 caps for the Ireland U-20 team, and 2 caps for Ireland Wolfhounds. In his second match for the Wolfhounds he scored a try against England Saxons on 28 January 2012. Kearney has 19 caps for the senior Ireland team, making his debut against Samoa, when he came on as a substitute and scored two tries. He played in every match in the 2014 Six Nations Championship when Ireland won their 12th Championship title, being one of only 3 players to play the full 80 minutes in every game, along with his brother Rob, and Jamie Heaslip.

== Honours ==
Leinster

- European Rugby Champions Cup (3): 2011, 2012, 2018
- Pro14 (6): 2013, 2014, 2018, 2019, 2020, 2021
- European Challenge Cup (1): 2013

Ireland

- Six Nations Championship (1): 2014

Individual

- Pro14 Dream Team of the Year (1): 2021
