= Michele Rizzo =

Italian rugby union player

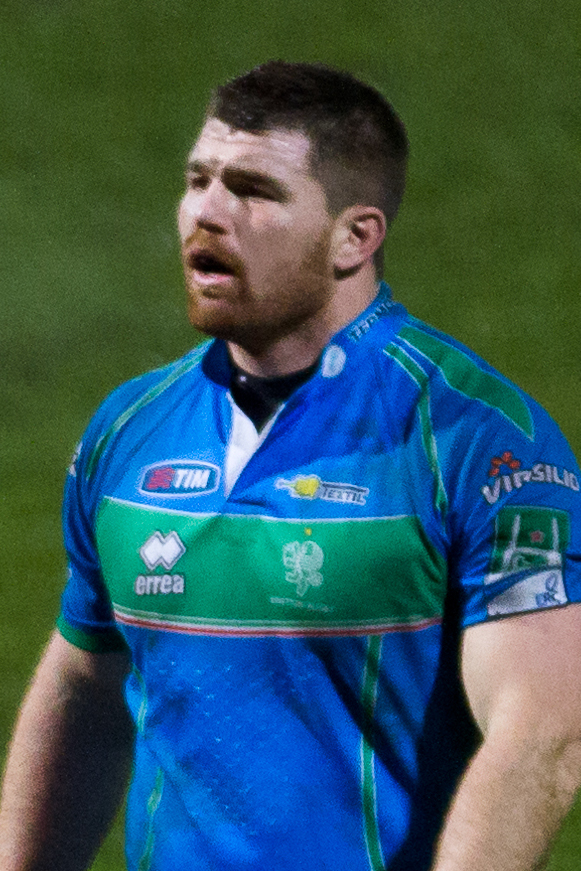
- Michele Rizzo in 2013
- Born: Michele Rizzo; 16 September 1982 (age 44) Dolo, Italy
- Height: 1.88 m (6 ft 2 in)
- Weight: 115 kg (254 lb; 18.1 st)

Rugby union career
- Position: Loosehead Prop / Hooker
Youth career
- 1992–01: Petrarca
Senior career
Years	Team	Apps	(Points)
2001–09	Petrarca	103	(35)
2009–14	Benetton Treviso	92	(20)
2014–18	Leicester Tigers	38	(10)
2017	→Edinburgh	8	(0)
2018–20	Petrarca	24	(5)
- Correct as of 27 March 2020
International career
Years	Team	Apps	(Points)
2002–03	Italy U21	4	(5)
2004–09	Italy A	12	(0)
2005–17	Italy	23	(5)
- Correct as of 27 March 2020
Coaching career
- Years: Team
- 2018–20: Petrarca (U18)
- 2020–: Verona (U18)
- Correct as of 14 May 2020

Michele Rizzo (born 16 September 1982) is a retired Italian former rugby union player. His preferred position was prop but he can also play as a hooker. Rizzo last played for Petrarca, the club where he spent most of his career and where he made his debut in Serie A1 halfway through the 2000–01 season in a match against Viadana. He spent four years between 2014–2018 in England playing 38 times (scoring 2 tries) for Leicester Tigers.

== Career ==
Rizzo was born in Dolo, province of Venice, but spent his early years living in Padua where he attended the Istituto professionale alberghiero Pietro d'Abano. He grew up playing for Petrarca alongside his younger brother Marco, of which he was also the captain for two seasons (2007–08 and 2008–09). With the reputation of being a solid and aggressive player, good in scrummage but who also loves playing ball in hand with surprising speed, Rizzo was seen as one of the best young Italian props. He has been capped by the Italy national rugby union team, making his debut playing 4 minutes against Australia in 2005. He was part of the Italy "A" squad that finished as runners-up at the 2009 IRB Nations Cup. In the same year, he joined Benetton Treviso, where he formed one of the league's best prop cores alongside Lorenzo Cittadini and Alberto De Marchi. With Benetton, Rizzo won a Scudetto and Coppa Italia double in 2009–10.

In 2012, Rizzo was selected by Italy's head coach Jacques Brunel to play in his first Six Nations. On 23 June 2014, Rizzo, along with teammate Leonardo Ghiraldini made his move to join Leicester Tigers in the English Aviva Premiership from the 2014–15 season. In the same year, after playing in the 2015 Rugby World Cup in England, Rizzo tore his anterior cruciate ligament, in the same knee where he suffered another bad injury in 2002, missing the rest of the season. He spent the early part of the 2017–18 season for Edinburgh Rugby of the Pro14 on a short-term emergency loan. He returned to Leicester in December and was immediately named in the club's Champions' Cup squad. On 30 May 2018, Rizzo returned to Petrarca on a two-year deal, where he ended his career.

Rizzo announced his retirement on March 27, 2020, age 37. During his career, Rizzo was one of many Italian rugby players under contract with Japanese sports equipment Asics. In June 2009, he married his girlfriend Silvia Rampazzo; the couple have two children, Sara and Giulio. He lives in Verona, where he works as an under-18 coach for Verona Rugby.

== Honours ==
- Italian championship
  - Benetton Treviso: 2009–10
- Coppa Italia
  - Petrarca: 2000–01
  - Benetton Treviso: 2009–10
- Supercoppa d'Italia
  - Benetton Treviso: 2009
- Anglo-Welsh Cup
  - Leicester Tigers: 2016–17
