= Brice Mach =

French rugby union player (born 1986)

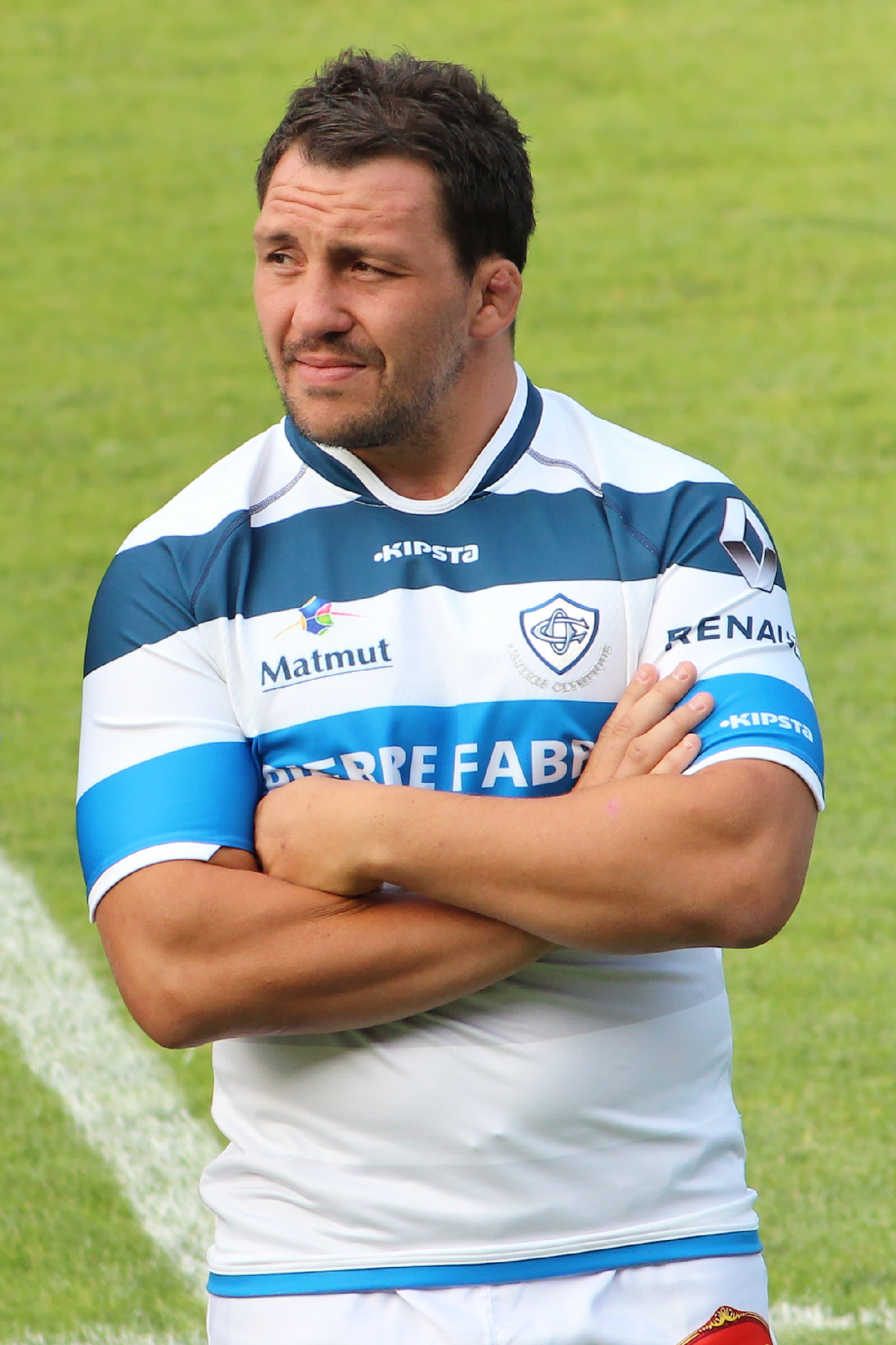
- A French rugby union player
- Born: Brice Mach; 2 April 1986 (age 40) Perpignan, France
- Height: 5 ft 10 in (1.78 m)
- Weight: 16 st 07 lb (105 kg)

Rugby union career
- Position: Hooker
- Current team: Castres Olympique
Senior career
Years	Team	Apps	(Points)
2006–2008	AS Béziers Hérault	48	(10)
2008–2010	US Montauban	54	(5)
2010–2011	Agen	26	(10)
2011–17	Castres Olympique	136	(55)
- Correct as of 31 January 2015
International career
Years	Team	Apps	(Points)
2004	France U18's	4	(0)
2005	France U19's	8	(0)
2006–2007	France U20's		
2014	France	3	(0)
- Correct as of 14 June 2014

Brice Mach (born 2 April 1986) is a French rugby union player who normally plays as a hooker, for French club Castres Olympique in the Top 14 and Heineken Cup. He made his debut for the national side on 21 February 2014, coming off the bench against Wales in round 3 of the 2014 Six Nations Championship.

== Honours ==
Top 14 champions

- Castres Olympique (2012–13)
