= John Allan (rugby union, born 1963) =

Scotland-born rugby union player

- Born: 25 November 1963 (age 62) Glasgow, Scotland
- School: Glenwood High School, Durban
- University: University of St Andrews, Fife
- Notable relative: Tommaso Allan (Nephew)

Rugby union career
- Position: Hooker
Amateur team(s)
| Years | Team | Apps | (Points) |
| 1989–1992 | Edinburgh Academical | | |
| 1992–1993 | London Scottish | | |
Provincial / State sides
| Years | Team | Apps | (Points) |
| 1988–1997 | Natal | 126 | |
| 1990 | Reds Trial | | |
International career
| Years | Team | Apps | (Points) |
| 1990 | Scotland 'A' | 1 | (0) |
| 1990–1991 | Scotland | 9 | (0) |
| 1993–1996 | South Africa | 13 | (0) |

John Allan (born 25 November 1963) is a former Scotland international rugby union player; and later a former South Africa international rugby union player. He played as a hooker.

== Rugby Union career ==
=== Amateur career ===
Allan was born on 25 November 1963 in Glasgow, Scotland. He lived in Scotland until he was 8 years old.

He then moved to South Africa. Allan attended Glenwood High School, where rugby first became a part of his life. In 1981, at the age of 17, he played for Glenwood High School's 1st XV.

From 1982 to 1985 he captained the Glenwood Old Boys U20 and the Natal U20 teams. From 1986 to 1987, he played for North Tvl Defence 1st XV and the South African Defence 1st XV3. Then from 1988 to 1990 he captained the Glenwood Old Boys 1st XV.

When Allan moved back to Scotland he played for Edinburgh Academicals.

He later played for London Scottish.

=== Provincial and professional career ===
Allan played for the Natal Provincial 1st XV, and played for the South African Select XV. He made his senior provincial debut for Natal in 1988.

In 1993 Allan was made captain of the Natal team. While with Natal, he was a part of the Currie Cup winning teams of 1992, 1995 and 1996. Between 1988 and 1997, Allan earned 126 caps for the Natal Sharks.

In Scotland, he played for the Reds Trial side in January 1990.

He played for a Presidents XV side in 1991 in a curtailed Scottish Inter-District Championship due to the Rugby World Cup.

=== International career ===
He played for Scotland 'A' in 1990 against Spain.

Between 1990 and 1991, Allan played 9 tests and 24 games for Scotland, as their hooker.

With apartheid ending in South Africa, Allan was given the chance to play for South Africa. Subsequently, between 1993 and 1996, he represented South Africa in 13 tests, also as hooker. Allan also played in 12 tour matches, scoring 6 tries for the Springboks.

He was nicknamed "Jok Bok" by his Scottish teammates and "Bokjock" by his Springbok teammates.

==== Test history ====
Scotland
| No. | Opposition | Result (Sco 1st) | Position | Tries | Date | Venue |
|---|---|---|---|---|---|---|
| 1. | New Zealand | 16–31 | Hooker | | 16 June 1990 | Carisbrook, Dunedin |
| 2. | Wales | 32–12 | Hooker | | 2 February 1991 | Murrayfield, Edinburgh |
| 3. | Ireland | 28–25 | Hooker | | 16 March 1991 | Murrayfield, Edinburgh |
| 4. | Romania | 12–18 | Hooker | | 31 August 1991 | Dinamo Stadion, Bucharest |
| 5. | Japan | 47–9 | Hooker | | 5 October 1991 | Murrayfield, Edinburgh |
| 6. | Ireland | 24–15 | Hooker | | 12 October 1991 | Murrayfield, Edinburgh |
| 7. | Samoa | 28–6 | Hooker | | 19 October 1991 | Murrayfield, Edinburgh |
| 8. | England | 6–9 | Hooker | | 26 October 1991 | Murrayfield, Edinburgh |
| 9. | New Zealand | 6–13 | Hooker | | 30 October 1991 | Cardiff Arms Park, Cardiff |
South Africa
| No. | Opposition | Result (SA 1st) | Position | Tries | Date | Venue |
| 1. | Australia | 19–12 | Hooker | | 31 July 1993 | Sydney Football Stadium (SFG), Sydney |
| 2. | Argentina | 29–26 | Hooker | | 5 November 1993 | Ferro Carril Oeste Stadium, Buenos Aires |
| 3. | Argentina | 52–23 | Hooker | | 13 November 1993 | Ferro Carril Oeste Stadium, Buenos Aires |
| 4. | England | 15–32 | Hooker | | 4 June 1994 | Loftus Versfeld, Pretoria |
| 5. | England | 27–9 | Hooker | | 11 June 1994 | Newlands, Cape Town |
| 6. | New Zealand | 14–22 | Hooker | | 9 July 1994 | Carisbrook, Dunedin |
| 7. | New Zealand | 9–13 | Hooker | | 23 July 1994 | Athletic Park, Wellington |
| 8. | New Zealand | 18–18 | Hooker | | 6 August 1994 | Eden Park, Auckland |
| 9. | Fiji | 43–18 | Hooker | | 2 July 1996 | Loftus Versfeld, Pretoria |
| 10. | Australia | 16–21 | Hooker | | 13 July 1996 | Sydney Football Stadium (SFG), Sydney |
| 11. | New Zealand | 11–15 | Hooker | | 20 July 1996 | AMI Stadium, Christchurch |
| 12. | Australia | 25–19 | Hooker | | 3 August 1996 | Free State Stadium, Bloemfontein |
| 13. | New Zealand | 18–29 | Hooker | | 10 August 1996 | Newlands, Cape Town |

=== Coaching career ===
In 1997, Allan started coaching. His first stint was with London Scottish, from 1997 to 1998 where they were promoted to the Premier Division, and Allan moved on to coach the Natal Sharks forwards in 1999.

From 2000 to 2003 Allan was the Director of Coaching for the Glenwood Falcons, while also commentating on Supersport. He also worked as an advisor to the Natal Sharks from 2000 to 2001, and became their Forward Consultant in 2003.

In 2004, he was appointed the CEO of SARLA, a duty he still performs to this day. He does this, while still managing to maintain his various other positions. He is still the Director of Coaching for his club, the Glenwood Falcons, and a Supersport TV Presenter; in addition, he became the Executive Director of The eLan Rugby Legends.

== Family ==
He is the uncle of Tommaso Allan, who played for Scotland at U-17, U-18 and U-20 and then, for the Italy national rugby union team

== See also ==
- List of South Africa national rugby union players – Springbok no. 594
- List of Scotland national rugby union players – no. 866
