= Leonardo Sarto =

Italy international rugby union player

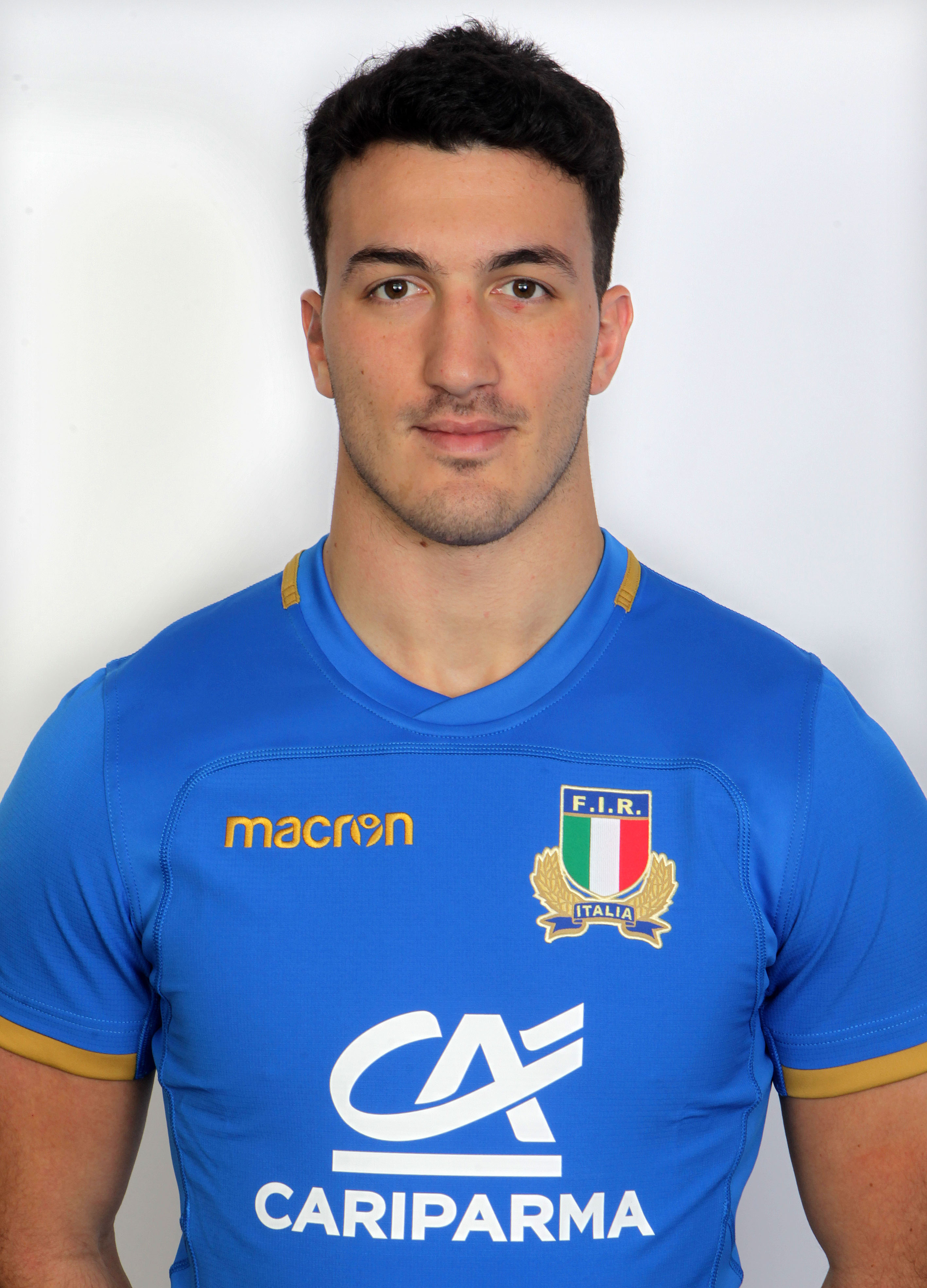
- Sarto in 2017
- Born: Leonardo Sarto; 15 January 1992 (age 34) Zevio, Italy
- Height: 1.92 m (6 ft 4 in)
- Weight: 93 kg (14 st 9 lb; 205 lb)
- Notable relative: Jacopo Sarto (brother)

Rugby union career
- Position: Wing
Amateur team(s)
Years	Team	Apps	(Points)
2011–2012	F.I.R. Academy		
2017−2018	Currie		
Senior career
Years	Team	Apps	(Points)
2012–2016	Zebre	55	(35)
2016–2018	Glasgow Warriors	18	(45)
2018–2019	Leicester Tigers	4	(0)
2019–2021	Benetton Rugby	17	(30)
2021–2024	Rovigo Delta	31	(65)
2024–	Mogliano Veneto		
- Correct as of 24 Apr 2021
International career
Years	Team	Apps	(Points)
2011–2012	Italy U20	8	(20)
2013-	Italy	35	(40)
- Correct as of 1 Feb 2020

Leonardo Sarto (born 15 January 1992) is an Italian rugby union player who currently plays for Mogliano Veneto in Serie A Elite. His principal position is wing.

== Rugby Union career ==
=== Amateur career ===
Sarto was drafted to Currie in the Scottish Premiership for the 2017-18 season.

=== Professional career ===
Sarto played eight games for Zebre, starting eight, playing 783 minutes, contributing 10 points in the 2015-2016 - PRO12 series.

On 8 March 2016 it was announced that Leonardo would sign for Glasgow Warriors in the summer of 2016 when the 2015-16 season concluded. Sarto made his debut for the Warriors in the pre-season match against Harlequins on 20 August 2016. In late December of 2018, Sarto signed with English Gallagher Premiership side Leicester Tigers. On 15 May 2019 he was announced as one of the players to leave Leicester following the end of the 2018-19 Premiership Rugby season.

Globally, he previously played for Italian side Zebre and Glasgow Warriors in the Pro14 and for Leicester Tigers in England's Premiership Rugby. From 2019 to 2021, Sarto played with Italian Pro14 team Benetton. He signed for Rovigo Delta in Top10 for three season until 2024.

=== International career ===
In 2011 and 2012, Sarto was named in the Italy Under 20 squad. In May 2013, Leonardo was called up by the Italian national rugby union team for the South African Quadrangular Tournament. On his international debut against Scotland, he scored his first try, though his team narrowly lost the game 29-30. In 2014, Sarto debut his first Six Nations Championship, landing two tries, one against Ireland and one against England. On 24 August 2015, he was named in the final 31-man squad for the 2015 Rugby World Cup.
