= Mike Hook =

Welsh rugby footballer & coach

- Born: 14 December 1982 (age 43) Port Talbot, Wales
- Height: 1.77 m (5 ft 10 in)
- Weight: 88 kg (13 st 12 lb)
- Notable relative: James Hook

Rugby union career
- Position: Fly-half
Senior career
Years	Team	Apps	(Points)
–	Newport RFC		
–	Bristol Rugby		
–	Redruth RFC		
–	Pertemps Bees		
–	Pontypool RFC		
- Correct as of 11:41, 1 March 2008 (UTC)
International career
Years	Team	Apps	(Points)
–	Wales Under-19		
–	Wales Under-21		
Coaching career
- Years: Team
- 2009–10: Dragons Academy
- 2009–14: Pontypool RFC
- 2014–16: Bridgend Ravens
- 2014–16: Ospreys Rugby
- Rugby league career

Playing information
- Position: Back
Club
Years	Team	Pld	T	G	FG	P
	Celtic Crusaders

Michael Hook (born 14 December 1982) is a rugby union skills coach and Head coach at the Ospreys and Welsh Premiership team the Bridgend Ravens respectively. Hook played the position of fly-half. Brother of Wales international James Hook he has represented Wales U16S up to U21s playing in two U21 world cups as well as being a part of the Grand Slam winning U21s team in 2003.

As a coach Mike led the resurgence of Pontypool RFC in 2012 and Was head coach at Bridgend Ravens for their Swalec cup title win in 2015. Mike grew up playing rugby in the Southern Welsh industrial town of Port Talbot, playing for such clubs as Aberavon RFC before turning pro at senior level with Newport RFC. He moved as a professional from Newport to Bristol Shoguns in 2003 where he suffered a shoulder injury that kept him out of the game for over a year. He made a comeback which included a season with Rugby league side the Celtic Crusaders. He played the 2006–2007 season for Cornish side Redruth in the English National Division where he broke their all-time points record. In a Rugby World article he commented that he still has ambitions to play for the Welsh full side. During the 2007–08 season Hook played firstly in National Division 1 with Pertemps Bees before signing for Newport RFC in the Welsh Premiership. Cont...

He is mentioned in Gavin Henson's autobiography as one of the players that beat him to a place for the Wales Fira Team. Mike took up coaching after retiring from the game due to a serious neck injury. Roles which include to date, Defence and Head coach at Pontypool RFC. Backs and Head coach at Bridgend Ravens and Skills Coach of the Regional side the Ospreys.
