= Luther Burrell =

England international rugby union & league player

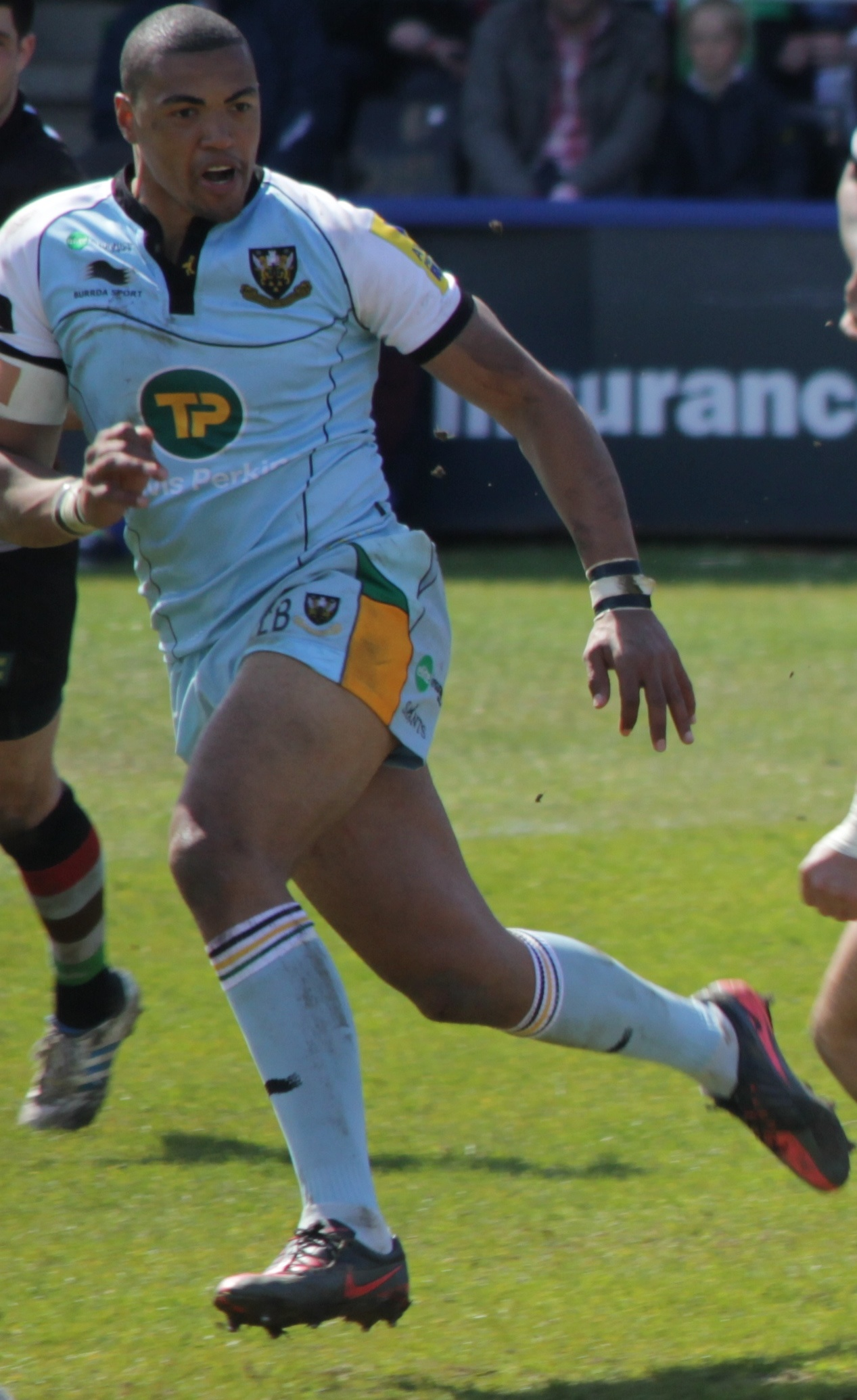

Personal information
- Born: 6 December 1987 (age 38) Huddersfield, West Yorkshire, England
- Height: 6 ft 3 in (1.91 m)
- Weight: 16 st 5 lb (104 kg)

Playing information

Rugby union
- Position: Centre
Club
Years	Team	Pld	T	G	FG	P
2006–11	Leeds Carnegie	41	8	0	0	30
	→ Huddersfield R.U.F.C.	1	0	0	0	0
2007–09	→ Otley	21	4	0	0	20
	→ Sedgley Park	9	2	0	0	10
	→ Rotherham Titans	5	1	0	0	5
2011–12	Sale Sharks	12	3	0	0	15
2012–19	Northampton Saints	121	32	0	0	160
2020–2022	Newcastle Falcons	13	0		0	0
	Total	223	50	0	0	240
Representative
Years	Team	Pld	T	G	FG	P
2014–16	England	15	4	0	0	20

Rugby league
- Position: Centre, Second-row
Club
Years	Team	Pld	T	G	FG	P
2019–20	Warrington Wolves	8	0	0	0	0
- Source: As of 5 September 2019

Luther Burrell (born 6 December 1987) is an English former professional rugby union and rugby league footballer who last played as a centre for the Newcastle Falcons in the Premiership.

He played rugby union for Leeds Carnegie (2006–2011), Sale Sharks (2011–2012) and Northampton Saints (2012–2019), and won 15 caps for England between 2014 and 2016. He switched codes and played rugby league for Warrington in 2019, then returned to rugby union, signing for Newcastle Falcons in 2020.

After his Newcastle contract ended in 2022, Burrell described racism as being rife in rugby. This led to an investigation by the Rugby Football Union, which found his allegations were true.

== Background ==
Burrell was born in Huddersfield, West Yorkshire, England. He is of Jamaican descent.

== Club career ==
Burrell studied at All Saints Catholic College and Huddersfield New College and started his career playing rugby league at U14 and U15 for the Huddersfield Giants before moving to Huddersfield Rugby Union Football Club. He made his senior rugby union debut for Leeds Carnegie aged 19 in 2006–07, and went on to make 41 appearances for the club. His rugby development was aided by several spells on loan to Championship clubs, including Sedgley Park (2007/08) and Otley. Burrell spent four seasons at Leeds before moving over the Pennines to Sale Sharks in 2011, and the following season he signed for Northampton Saints. At Saints he won the Aviva Premiership in the 2013–14 season, starting the final, and gained 7 England caps. He also represented the West Indies at sevens.

On 19 February 2019 it was announced that Burrell would be leaving Saints at the end of the 2018–19 season to join Warrington Wolves in July 2019.

On 20 September 2020, Burrell switched back to union code to sign for Newcastle Falcons in the Premiership Rugby on a two-year contract from the 2020–21 season.

He left Newcastle Falcons in June 2022.

=== Racism allegations ===
In an interview with the Mail on Sunday in June 2022, Burrell said that racism was rife in the sport, and described WhatsApp messages, racist banter and jokes that took place in his time at Newcastle. The Rugby Football Union investigated his claims, and found that they were true, on the balance of probabilities.

Burrell was aged 34 and out of contract at the time of his allegations. Since then he only played three times for the Barbarians. In 2025 he said that making the allegations effectively forced him to retire.

== International career ==
He was called up by Stuart Lancaster to represent England in May 2013 after his good form and an injury to another League convert Joel Tomkins.

In January 2014, he was named in the England starting XV for the 2014 Six Nations Championship opening game away to France on 1 February, where he scored his first international try in a 26–24 defeat, running onto a pass to go over and score under the posts. A week later on 8 February, he scored his second try in two matches at Murrayfield against Scotland in a 20–0 win. He continued his fine form in the 2014 Six Nations by scoring another try in the 29–18 victory against defending champions Wales with a good finish in the corner, beating two Welsh defenders to latch on to a Billy Twelvetrees grubber-kick. On 27 August 2015, he was left out of England's 2015 World Cup squad.

In May 2016, Burrell was recalled to the England side under Eddie Jones and played in the summer Test at Twickenham against Wales. After scoring in the 20th minute of that game, Burrell was rewarded by being selected for England's tour of Australia and playing in the first game of their Test series win.

== International tries ==
Try	Opponent	Location	Venue	Competition	Date	Result	Score
1	France	Saint-Denis, France	Stade de France	2014 Six Nations Championship	1 February 2014	Loss	26 – 24
2	Scotland	Edinburgh, Scotland	Murrayfield Stadium	2014 Six Nations Championship	8 February 2014	Win	20 – 0
3	Wales	London, England	Twickenham Stadium	2014 Six Nations Championship	9 March 2014	Win	29 – 18
4	Wales	London, England	Twickenham Stadium	Old Mutual Wealth Cup	29 May 2016	Win	27 – 13
