= Joshua Furno =

Italy international rugby union player

- Born: Raffaele Joshua Furno; 21 October 1989 (age 37) Melbourne, Australia
- Height: 2.02 m (6 ft 7 1/2 in)
- Weight: 118 kg (18 st 8 lb; 260 lb)

Rugby union career
- Position: Lock / Flanker
- Current team: US Dax
Youth career
- 2008-2009: F.I.R. Academy
Senior career
Years	Team	Apps	(Points)
2009–2010	Viadana	4	(0)
2010–2012	Aironi	32	(5)
2012–2013	Narbonne	19	(20)
2013–2014	Biarritz	24	(5)
2014−2016	Newcastle	20	(20)
2016−2017	Zebre	18	(0)
2017	Otago	9	(15)
2018	Western Force	0	(0)
2019−2020	San Diego Legion	8	(10)
2019	Wellington	11	(5)
2020−2021	Biarritz	7	(5)
2021	San Diego Legion	5	(15)
2022	Bourg-en-Bresse	9	(0)
2022−2023	Zebre Parma	9	(5)
2023−	Dax		
- Correct as of 1 Oct 2022
International career
Years	Team	Apps	(Points)
2008−2009	Italy Under 20	12	(5)
2011	Emerging Italy	3	(0)
2012−2017	Italy	37	(10)
- Correct as of 5 February 2017

Joshua Furno (born 21 October 1989) is an Italian rugby union player who plays Lock for US Dax in Pro D2. He also represents Italy as a member of the Italian national team.

== Career ==
Raffaele Joshua Furno was born in Australia but grew up in Italy in the southern town of Benevento. He began his career with Viadana, then played with successor team Aironi in the Pro12 before their dissolution in 2012.

He then moved to RC Narbonne in the French second division. Furno signed for Biarritz Olympique who compete in the Top 14 during the 2013–14 season. After the experience with Biarritz, on 14 May 2014, Furno moved to England to sign for Newcastle Falcons in the Aviva Premiership ahead of the 2014–15 and 2015–16 seasons. In 2016−2017 season, he played for Zebre in the Pro12. After the experience with Otago and Wellington in New Zealand and San Diego Legion in United States, in 2022 he came back in France in order to play for Bressane in ProD2. In August 2022, after 5 year, he come back to Zebre Parma for 2022−23 season.

In 2008 and 2009 Furno was named in the Italy Under 20 squad and in 2011 he was part of Emerging Italy squad. He made his test debut with Italian national team as a substitute in a 13–6 win against Scotland in the 2012 Six Nations Championship.

On 22 February 2014, he scored his first try for Italy in a Six Nations defeat to Scotland, and was subsequently named Man of the Match. On 24 August 2015, he was named in the final 31-man squad for the 2015 Rugby World Cup.
