= James Hook (rugby union) =

Welsh rugby union player (born 1985)

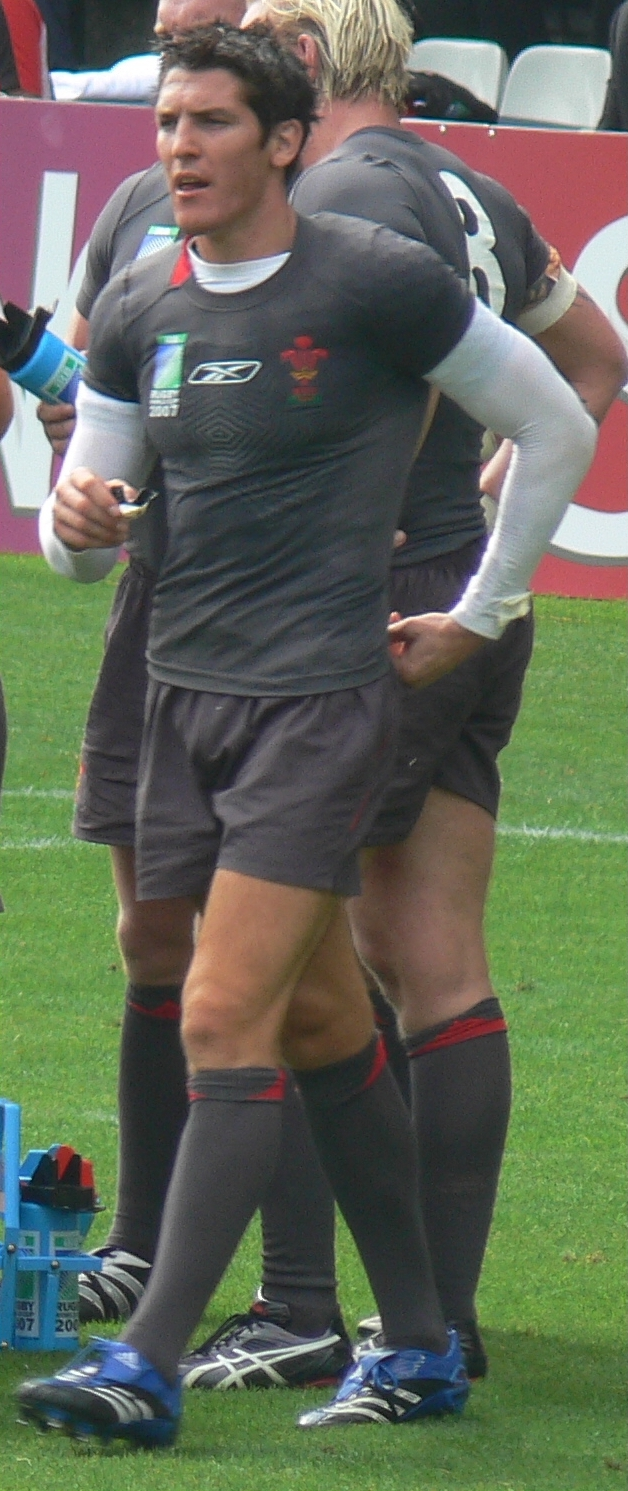
- Hook at Rugby World Cup 2007
- Born: James William Hook; 27 June 1985 (age 41) Port Talbot, Wales
- Height: 6 ft 1 in (1.85 m)
- Weight: 15 st 2 lb; 212 lb (96 kg)
- School: Central Junior School; Glan Afan Comprehensive School, Port Talbot; Neath College
- Notable relative: Mike Hook (brother)

Rugby union career
- Position(s): Fly-half; Centre; Fullback
Senior career
Years	Team	Apps	(Points)
2004–06	Neath RFC	16	(204)
2011–14	Perpignan	68	(801)
2014–17	Gloucester	78	(294)
- Correct as of 3 September 2017
Provincial / State sides
Years	Team	Apps	(Points)
2006–11, 2017–20	Ospreys	149	(841)
International career
Years	Team	Apps	(Points)
2006–2015	Wales	81	(352)
2009	British & Irish Lions	0	
- Correct as of 17 October 2015
National sevens team
Years	Team		Comps
2005–06	Wales		

James William Hook (born 27 June 1985) is a Welsh retired rugby union player. Hook has won 81 caps for Wales (currently 13th all-time) and is Wales' fifth highest all-time points scorer. Most often playing as a fly-half, Hook is known as a utility player, and has also played as a centre, wing and fullback.

Hook began his club career with Neath, from 2004 to 2006. He then played for the Ospreys (2006–2011), Perpignan (2011–2014) and Gloucester (2014–2016), before returning to the Ospreys in 2016.

Hook toured South Africa in 2009 with the British & Irish Lions, making six appearances. He was named on the bench for the third test, but did not play in the game.

== Early and personal life ==
Hook was born in the South Wales industrial town of Port Talbot, the second of three children. His brother Mike Hook was also a professional rugby player, and sister Naidine a keen netball player. He attended Glan Afan Comprehensive School in the centre of Port Talbot, and Neath College where he started a half back combination with Martin Roberts.

Hook's childhood heroes were Neil Jenkins and Robert Jones – Jenkins because of his kicking ability, and Jones because he played in Hook's favourite position, which was scrum-half, the position he himself played for West Wales at the age of ten.

In June 2011, Hook married long-term partner Kimberley. In 2004 Kimberley was in the U17 Welsh Netball Squad. The couple have a son, born on 23 December 2009. In 2014, Hook announced that Kimberley was pregnant with their second child.

== Career ==
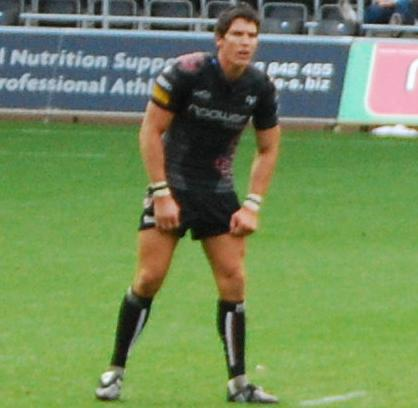
Hook in action for the Ospreys

=== Club ===
Hook grew up playing schoolboy rugby with the junior and youth set-ups at various Port Talbot-based clubs including Aberavon Quins RFC, Taibach RFC and Corus (Port Talbot) RFC.

At senior level and before making the step up to regional rugby with the Ospreys, Hook enjoyed great success for Neath RFC, becoming the record holder for the highest individual points tally within a season. He also played for Neath College as a youngster.

Hook played his way into the Ospreys first XV in the 2006–07 Magners League season, giving outstanding performances at both fly-half and inside centre. He kicked a conversion in a Pool 3 match against the Sale Sharks during the 2006-07 Heineken Cup, clinching the Ospreys win following a try from Shane Williams.

In November 2010 it was announced that Hook would not be signing a new contract with the Ospreys. On 26 January 2011 James announced that he would be joining French Top 14 side USA Perpignan on a 3-year deal for the 2011–12 season despite warnings from Wales' national coach Warren Gatland that he may not consider players based outside Wales in his future squads.

On 2 June 2014, Hook was granted early release from USA Perpignan, following their relegation from the Top 14, to join Gloucester Rugby in the English Aviva Premiership on a three-year contract.

On 30 November 2016, Hook rejoined home region Ospreys in Wales on a three-year deal ahead of the 2017–18 season.

=== International ===
After excelling at under-21 level for Wales, Hook starred for the Welsh sevens team, scoring a match-winning try to defeat South Africa Sevens in the plate final of the 2006 Commonwealth Games. Hook made his international debut against Argentina under new Welsh coach Gareth Jenkins, scoring a late try in the match.

Hook made his home debut for Wales against Australia on 4 November 2006 as a substitute for the injured Stephen Jones. He showed great composure in scoring 13 points as Wales drew the match 29–29 and was named as Wales' Man of the Match. Hook played against the Pacific Islands, scoring a try, and against Canada where he scored 16 points.

During the 2007 Six Nations Championship, Hook played in all of Wales's games, but was hampered by being employed at inside centre, rather than in his preferred position of fly-half for the first four matches. As a result, he struggled to make an impact. In the final game against England, however, he was finally switched to fly-half and produced a Man of the Match-winning performance, scoring 22 points in Wales' 27–18 win. He also completed his first "full house" in this match (scoring a drop goal, penalty, try and conversion). The victory was Wales' first over a 'Tier One' rugby nation since the 2006 Six Nations Championship victory over Scotland.

Hook put in a man-of-the-match performance as he helped Wales beat England 26–19 in the first game of the 2008 Six Nations Championship on 2 February 2008.

On 10 February 2008, Hook was selected at fly-half for the 30–15 win over Scotland in the 2008 Six Nations Championship. Hook scored a try and kicked two conversions and a penalty, before being replaced by Stephen Jones in the 58th minute. He was a member of the Wales side that completed the Grand Slam with victory against France.

In May 2009, Hook was included in the 2009 British & Irish Lions tour to South Africa. He was called into the squad as a utility back to cover his Wales teammate, Leigh Halfpenny, who was forced to withdraw from the beginning of the tour with a thigh injury. He made his British & Irish Lions debut on 3 June, playing against the Lions Super Rugby team. Hook came off the bench in that game to score one try and kick 3 conversions. He did not however play in a test match on the tour.

In 2010, Hook was selected to the Wales 2010 Six Nations Championship team, playing for the first time at outside centre.

In January 2011, Hook confirmed he would join French side Perpignan on a three-year contract from the start of the 2011–12 season. His contract guaranteed availability for all of Wales's 2011 Rugby World Cup preparatory games. However, there is no clause covering future release outside of the normal International Rugby Board window.

=== International tries ===
Try	Opponent	Location	Venue	Competition	Date	Result
1	Argentina	Puerto Madryn, Argentina	Estadio Raúl Conti	2006 Summer Tests	11 June 2006	Loss
2	Pacific Islanders	Cardiff, Wales	Millennium Stadium	2006 Autumn Internationals	11 November 2006	Win
3	England	Cardiff, Wales	Millennium Stadium	2007 Six Nations	17 March 2007	Win
4	France	Cardiff, Wales	Millennium Stadium	2007 Rugby World Cup warm-up matches	26 August 2007	Loss
5	Japan	Cardiff, Wales	Millennium Stadium	2007 Rugby World Cup	20 September 2007	Win
6	Scotland	Cardiff, Wales	Millennium Stadium	2008 Six Nations	9 February 2008	Win
7	England	London, England	Twickenham	2010 Six Nations	6 February 2010	Loss
8	Italy	Cardiff, Wales	Millennium Stadium	2010 Six Nations	20 March 2010	Win
9	Italy	Cardiff, Wales	Millennium Stadium	2010 Six Nations	20 March 2010	Win
10	South Africa	Cardiff, Wales	Millennium Stadium	2010 Summer Tests	5 June 2010	Loss
11	South Africa	Cardiff, Wales	Millennium Stadium	2010 Autumn Internationals	13 November 2010	Loss
12	England	Cardiff, Wales	Millennium Stadium	2011 Rugby World Cup warm-up matches	13 August 2011	Win
13	Barbarian F.C.	Cardiff, Wales	Millennium Stadium	2012 Summer Internationals	2 June 2012	Win

=== Post rugby career ===
On 13 January 2020, Hook announced his retirement from the game, to take place at the end of the 2019–20 season upon expiration of his contract with the Ospreys. He mentioned wanting to remain involved in rugby by coaching, with focus on skills, but also with his first children-stories book in the release process.

On 11 August 2020, Hook stays with his team Ospreys as their new Kicking and Skills coach.

In 2021, Hook took part in S4C's Welsh language learning programme Iaith ar Daith, being paired with referee Nigel Owens as his mentor.
