= List of Wales national rugby union team records =

Wales have competed in the sport of rugby union since their first international in 1881. They take part in the annual Six Nations Championship and have appeared at every Rugby World Cup.

The records listed below only include performances in test matches. The top five are listed in each category (except when there is a tie for the last place among the five, when all the tied record holders are noted).

== Team records ==
=== Greatest winning margin ===
#	Margin	Date	Opposing team	Result	Venue	Competition
1	98	26 November 2004	Japan	98 – 0	Millennium Stadium, Cardiff, Wales	2004 Autumn Internationals
2	91	17 May 1994	Portugal	102 – 11	Universitario Lisboa, Lisbon, Portugal	1995 Rugby World Cup qualifier
3	74	4 June 2005	United States	77 – 3	Rentschler Field, Hartford, United States	2005 Summer Internationals
4	74	26 September 2011	Namibia	81 – 7	Yarrow Stadium, New Plymouth, New Zealand	2011 Rugby World Cup
5	72	19 September 2001	Romania	81 – 9	Millennium Stadium, Cardiff, Wales	2001 Autumn Internationals

=== Greatest losing margin ===
#	Margin	Date	Opposing team	Result	Venue	Competition
1	83	27 June 1998	South Africa	13 – 96	Loftus Versfeld Stadium, Pretoria, South Africa	1998 Summer Tour
2	73	29 November 2025	South Africa	0 – 73	Principality Stadium, Cardiff, Wales	2025 end-of-year rugby union internationals
3	57	22 July 1991	Australia	6 – 63	Ballymore Stadium, Brisbane, Australia	1991 Summer Tour
4	57	4 June 2007	England	5 – 62	Twickenham Stadium, London, England	2007 Rugby World Cup warm-up matches
5	54	15 March 2025	England	14 – 68	Millennium Stadium, Cardiff, Wales	2025 Six Nations Championship

== Individual career records ==
=== Most caps ===
#	Player	Period	Caps	Starts	Subs	Position
1	Alun Wyn Jones	2006–2023	158	143	15	Lock
2	Gethin Jenkins	2002–2016	129	93	36	Prop
3	George North	2010–2024	121	116	5	Wing/centre
4	Dan Biggar	2008–2023	112	92	20	Fly-half
5	Taulupe Faletau	2011–	109	99	10	Number 8
6	Stephen Jones	1998–2011	104	86	18	Fly-half
7	Leigh Halfpenny	2008–2023	101	95	6	Fullback
8	Gareth Thomas	1995–2007	100	94	6	Wing
8	Martyn Williams	1996–2012	100	87	13	Flanker
10	Jonathan Davies	2009–2022	96	91	5	Centre

Last updated: 5 July 2025. Statistics include officially capped matches only.

=== Most points ===
#	Player	Period	Points	Caps	Tries	Con	Pen	DG	PPG
1	Neil Jenkins	1991–2002	1049	87	11	130	248	10	12.06
2	Stephen Jones	1998–2011	917	104	7	153	186	6	8.82
3	Leigh Halfpenny	2008–2023	801	101	15	81	188	0	7.93
4	Dan Biggar	2008–2023	631	112	8	102	120	9	5.63
5	James Hook	2006–2015	352	81	13	46	61	4	4.35
6	Paul Thorburn	1985–1991	304	37	2	43	70	0	8.22
7	Shane Williams	2000–2011	290	87	58	0	0	0	3.33
8	George North	2010–2024	235	121	47	0	0	0	1.96
9	Arwel Thomas	1996–2000	211	23	11	30	32	0	9.17
10	Gareth Thomas	1995–2007	200	100	40	0	0	0	2

Last updated: 17 March 2024. Statistics include officially capped matches only.

=== Most tries ===
#	Player	Period	Tries	Caps	Ave.	Position
1	Shane Williams	2000–2011	58	87	0.67	Wing
2	George North	2010–2024	47	121	0.39	Wing/centre
3	Gareth Thomas	1995–2007	40	100	0.4	Wing
4	Ieuan Evans	1987–1998	33	72	0.46	Wing
5	Josh Adams	2018–	27	75	0.36	Wing
6	Colin Charvis	1996–2007	22	94	0.23	Flanker
7	Liam Williams	2012–2025	21	93	0.23	Fullback
8	Gerald Davies	1966–1978	20	46	0.43	Wing
8	Gareth Edwards	1967–1978	20	53	0.38	Scrum-half
8	Tom Shanklin	2001–2011	20	70	0.29	Centre

Last updated: 21 November 2026. Statistics include officially capped matches only.

=== Most appearances as captain ===
#	Player	Period	Caps	Win %	Position
1	Sam Warburton	2011–2016	49	0.47	Flanker
2	Alun Wyn Jones	2009–2021	48	0.58	Lock
3	Ryan Jones	2008–2013	33	0.58	Flanker
4	Ieuan Evans	1991–1995	28	0.46	Wing
5	Dewi Lake	2023–	23	0.3	Hooker
6	Colin Charvis	2002–2004	22	0.5	Flanker
6	Rob Howley	1998–1999	22	0.68	Scrum-half
8	Gareth Thomas	2003–2007	21	0.43	Wing
9	Jonathan Humphreys	1995–2003	19	0.32	Hooker
10	Arthur Gould	1889–1897	18	0.44	Fly half

== Match records ==
=== Most points in a match ===
#	Player	Pts	Tries	Con	Pen	DG	Opposition	Venue	Date
1	Neil Jenkins	30	1	5	5	0	Italy	Stadio Comunale di Monigo, Treviso	20 March 1999
2	Neil Jenkins	29	0	1	9	0	France	Millennium Stadium, Cardiff	28 August 1999
3	Neil Jenkins	28	1	1	7	0	Canada	Millennium Stadium, Cardiff	21 August 1999
3	Neil Jenkins	28	1	4	5	0	France	Stade de France, Saint-Denis	17 March 2001
3	Gavin Henson	28	0	14	0	0	Japan	Millennium Stadium, Cardiff	26 November 2004
6	Neil Jenkins	27	0	3	7	0	Italy	Millennium Stadium, Cardiff	19 February 2000
7	Stephen Jones	26	0	10	2	0	Romania	Millennium Stadium, Cardiff	19 September 2001
8	Neil Jenkins	24	0	0	8	0	Canada	Millennium Stadium, Cardiff	10 November 1993
8	Neil Jenkins	24	0	0	7	1	Italy	Millennium Stadium, Cardiff	12 October 1994
8	Gavin Henson	24	0	6	4	0	Romania	The Racecourse, Wrexham	27 August 2003
8	Leigh Halfpenny	24	2	4	2	0	Scotland	Millennium Stadium, Cardiff	4 February 2018

=== Most tries in a match ===
#	Player	Tries	Opposing team	Venue	Competition	Date
1	Willie Llewellyn	4	England	St. Helen's, Swansea	1899 Home Nations Championship	7 January 1899
1	Reggie Gibbs	4	France	National Stadium, Cardiff	Test Match	2 March 1908
1	Maurice Richards	4	England	National Stadium, Cardiff	1969 Five Nations Championship	12 April 1969
1	Ieuan Evans	4	Canada	Rugby Park Stadium, Invercargill	1987 Rugby World Cup	3 June 1987
1	Nigel Walker	4	Portugal	Universitario Lisboa, Lisbon	Test Match	18 May 1995
1	Gareth Thomas	4	Italy	Stadio Comunale di Monigo, Treviso	Test Match	20 March 1999
1	Shane Williams	4	Japan	Hanazono Rugby Stadium, Osaka	Test Match	10 June 2001
1	Tom Shanklin	4	Romania	Millennium Stadium, Cardiff	2004 Autumn Internationals	15 November 2004
1	Colin Charvis	4	Japan	Millennium Stadium, Cardiff	2004 Autumn Internationals	26 November 2004

== Rugby World Cup records ==
=== Overall ===
Most appearances at Rugby World Cup
21 – Alun Wyn Jones (2007, 2011, 2015, 2019)

Most Rugby World Cup tournaments
4 – Gareth Thomas, Stephen Jones, Gethin Jenkins, Alun Wyn Jones, George North

Most points at Rugby World Cup
123 – Dan Biggar (2015, 2019, 2023)

Most tries at Rugby World Cup
10 – Shane Williams (2003, 2007, 2011)

=== Tournament ===
Most points in a tournament
57 – Neil Jenkins (1999)

Most tries in a tournament
7 – Josh Adams (2019)

=== Match ===
Most points in a match
23 – Dan Biggar vs England (2015), Gareth Anscombe vs Australia (2023)

Most tries in a match
4 – Ieuan Evans vs Canada (1987)

Fastest score at Rugby World Cup
36 seconds – Dan Biggar vs Australia (2019)

Fastest try at Rugby World Cup
2 minutes 8 seconds – Jonathan Davies vs Georgia (2019)
