= Lorenzo Cittadini =

Italian rugby union player (born 1982)

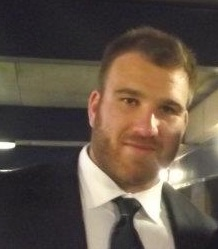
- Born: Lorenzo Cittadini; 17 December 1982 (age 43) Bergamo, Italy
- Height: 1.91 m (6 ft 3 in)
- Weight: 124 kg (19 st 7 lb; 273 lb)

Rugby union career
- Position: Tighthead Prop
Youth career
- 1999–2000: Brescia
Senior career
Years	Team	Apps	(Points)
2000–2005	Brescia	22	(35)
2005–2009	Calvisano	49	(45)
2009–2014	Benetton Treviso	91	(15)
2014−2016	Wasps	48	(10)
2016–2017	Bayonne	18	(0)
2017−2018	Stade Français	14	(0)
2018−2019	Verona	20	(5)
2019−2020	Calvisano	14	(5)
- Correct as of 28 August 2019
International career
Years	Team	Apps	(Points)
2006–2007	Italy A	15	(0)
2008–2017	Italy	58	(15)
- Correct as of 18 March 2018
Coaching career
- Years: Team
- 2020–: Calvisano (assistant coach)

Lorenzo Cittadini (born 17 December 1982) is a retired Italian rugby union player who plays at prop. He made his debut for Italy against Ireland on 2 February 2008. He played at the 2011 Rugby World Cup in New Zealand and the 2015 Rugby World Cup in England.He represented Italy on 58 occasions.

On 22 April 2014, Cittadini moved to England to join Wasps in the Aviva Premiership from the 2014-15 season. On 30 June 2016, Cittadini makes move to France with Bayonne in the Top 14 from the 2016-17 season.

== Honours ==
- National Championship of Excellence
  - Champions Calvisano: 2007–08
  - Champions Benetton Treviso: 2009–10
- Coppa Italia
  - Champions Benetton Treviso: 2009–10
