= 2015 Rugby World Cup Pool D =

Pool D of the 2015 Rugby World Cup began on 19 September and was completed on 11 October 2015. The pool was composed of France (the 2011 runners-up), Ireland and Italy – who all qualified automatically for the tournament due to finishing in the top three positions in their pools in 2011 – joined by the top American qualifier, Canada, and the second European qualifier, Romania. The top two teams; Ireland and France qualified for the quarter-finals.

== Standings ==
Pos	Team	Pld	W	D	L	PF	PA	PD	T	B	Pts	Qualification
1	Ireland	4	4	0	0	134	35	+99	16	2	18	Advanced to the quarter-finals and qualified for the 2019 Rugby World Cup
2	France	4	3	0	1	120	63	+57	12	2	14	Advanced to the quarter-finals and qualified for the 2019 Rugby World Cup
3	Italy	4	2	0	2	74	88	−14	7	2	10	Eliminated but qualified for 2019 Rugby World Cup
4	Romania	4	1	0	3	60	129	−69	7	0	4	
5	Canada	4	0	0	4	58	131	−73	7	2	2	

== Matches ==
All times are local United Kingdom time (UTC+01)

=== Ireland vs Canada ===
19 September 2015
14:30

Ireland	50–7	Canada
Try: O'Brien 18' c Henderson 25' c Sexton 28' m D. Kearney 35' c Cronin 66' c R. Kearney 73' c Payne 76' c Con: Sexton (3/4) 19', 26', 37'; Madigan (3/3) 67', 74', 77'; Pen: Sexton (1/1) 14'	Report	Try: Van der Merwe 68' c Con: Hirayama (1/1) 69'

Millennium Stadium, Cardiff
Attendance: 68,523
Referee: Glen Jackson (New Zealand)

Ireland	Canada

FB	15	Rob Kearney		(substituted off) 79'
RW	14	David Kearney
OC	13	Jared Payne
IC	12	Luke Fitzgerald
LW	11	Keith Earls
FH	10	Johnny Sexton		(substituted off) 56'
SH	9	Conor Murray		(substituted off) 66'
N8	8	Jamie Heaslip
OF	7	Seán O'Brien		(substituted off) 63'
BF	6	Peter O'Mahony
RL	5	Paul O'Connell (c)	(yellow card) 42'	(substituted off) 74'
LL	4	Iain Henderson
TP	3	Mike Ross		(substituted off) 61'
HK	2	Rory Best		(substituted off) 61'
LP	1	Jack McGrath		(substituted off) 61'
Replacements:
HK	16	Seán Cronin		(substituted in) 61'
PR	17	Cian Healy		(substituted in) 61'
PR	18	Nathan White		(substituted in) 61'
LK	19	Donnacha Ryan		(substituted in) 74'
FL	20	Chris Henry		(substituted in) 63'
SH	21	Eoin Reddan		(substituted in) 66'
FH	22	Ian Madigan		(substituted in) 56'
WG	23	Simon Zebo		(substituted in) 79'
Coach:
(New Zealand) Joe Schmidt

FB	15	Matt Evans		(substituted off) 41'
RW	14	Jeff Hassler		(substituted off) 41'
OC	13	Ciaran Hearn
IC	12	Nick Blevins
LW	11	D. T. H. van der Merwe
FH	10	Nathan Hirayama
SH	9	Gordon McRorie		(substituted off) 48'
N8	8	Aaron Carpenter
OF	7	John Moonlight
BF	6	Kyle Gilmour		(substituted off) 48'
RL	5	Jamie Cudmore (c)	(yellow card) 17'
LL	4	Brett Beukeboom
TP	3	Doug Wooldridge		(substituted off) 66'
HK	2	Ray Barkwill		(substituted off) 63'
LP	1	Hubert Buydens		(substituted off) 48'
Replacements:
HK	16	Benoît Piffero		(substituted in) 63'
PR	17	Djustice Sears-Duru		(substituted in) 48'
PR	18	Andrew Tiedemann		(substituted in) 66'
FL	19	Jebb Sinclair		(substituted in) 48'
N8	20	Richard Thorpe			(substituted in) 75'
SH	21	Phil Mack		(substituted in) 48'
FH	22	Liam Underwood		(substituted in) 41'	(substituted off) 75'
CE	23	Conor Trainor		(substituted in) 41'
Coach:
(New Zealand) Kieran Crowley

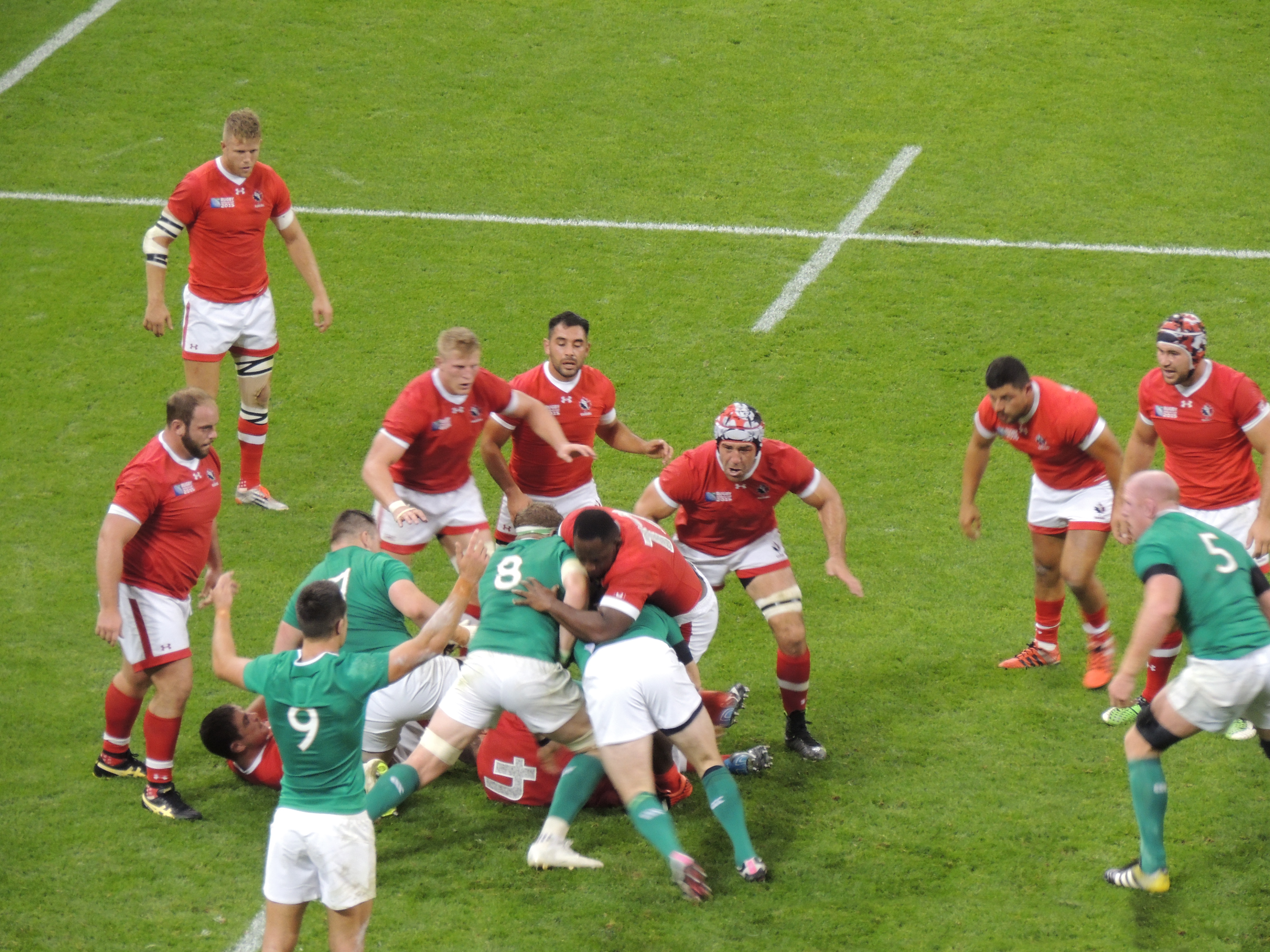

Man of the Match:
Johnny Sexton (Ireland)

Touch judges:
Pascal Gaüzère (France)
Mike Fraser (New Zealand)
Television match official:
Ben Skeen (New Zealand)

=== France vs Italy ===
19 September 2015
20:00

France	32–10	Italy
Try: Slimani 44' c Mas 69' c Con: Michalak (2/2) 45', 70'; Pen: Michalak (5/7) 7', 11', 28', 40', 42'; Spedding (1/1) 38'	Report	Try: Venditti 52' c Con: Allan (1/1) 53'; Pen: Allan (1/2) 34'

Twickenham Stadium, London
Attendance: 76,232
Referee: Craig Joubert (South Africa)

France	Italy

FB	15	Scott Spedding
RW	14	Yoann Huget	(substituted off) 55'
OC	13	Mathieu Bastareaud
IC	12	Alexandre Dumoulin
LW	11	Noa Nakaitaci
FH	10	Frédéric Michalak	(substituted off) 76'
SH	9	Sébastien Tillous-Borde	(substituted off) 57'
N8	8	Louis Picamoles	(substituted off) 66'
OF	7	Damien Chouly
BF	6	Thierry Dusautoir (c)
RL	5	Yoann Maestri	(substituted off) 69'
LL	4	Pascal Papé
TP	3	Rabah Slimani	(substituted off) 63'
HK	2	Guilhem Guirado	(substituted off) 67'
LP	1	Eddy Ben Arous	(substituted off) 61'
Replacements:
HK	16	Benjamin Kayser	(substituted in) 67'
PR	17	Vincent Debaty	(substituted in) 61'
PR	18	Nicolas Mas	(substituted in) 63'
FL	19	Bernard Le Roux	(substituted in) 66'
LK	20	Alexandre Flanquart	(substituted in) 69'
SH	21	Morgan Parra	(substituted in) 57'
FH	22	Rémi Talès	(substituted in) 76'
CE	23	Gaël Fickou	(substituted in) 55'
Coach:
(France) Philippe Saint-André

FB	15	Luke McLean
RW	14	Leonardo Sarto
OC	13	Michele Campagnaro
IC	12	Andrea Masi	(substituted off) 11'
LW	11	Giovanbattista Venditti
FH	10	Tommaso Allan	(substituted off) 79'
SH	9	Edoardo Gori	(substituted off) 72'
N8	8	Samuela Vunisa
OF	7	Francesco Minto	(substituted off) 61'
BF	6	Alessandro Zanni
RL	5	Joshua Furno	(substituted off) 72'
LL	4	Quintin Geldenhuys
TP	3	Martin Castrogiovanni	(substituted off) 50'
HK	2	Leonardo Ghiraldini (c)	(substituted off) 61'
LP	1	Matías Agüero	(substituted off) 50'
Replacements:
HK	16	Andrea Manici	(substituted in) 61'
PR	17	Michele Rizzo	(substituted in) 50'
PR	18	Lorenzo Cittadini	(substituted in) 50'
LK	19	Valerio Bernabò	(substituted in) 72'
FL	20	Simone Favaro	(substituted in) 61'
SH	21	Guglielmo Palazzani	(substituted in) 72'
FH	22	Carlo Canna	(substituted in) 79'
CE	23	Enrico Bacchin	(substituted in) 11'
Coach:
(France) Jacques Brunel

Man of the Match:
Louis Picamoles (France)

Touch judges:
John Lacey (Ireland)
Stuart Berry (South Africa)
Television match official:
Shaun Veldsman (South Africa)

Notes:

- Martin Castrogiovanni became Italy's most capped player with 114 caps.

=== France vs Romania ===
23 September 2015
20:00

France	38–11	Romania
Try: Guitoune (2) 30' c, 66' c Nyanga 34' c Fofana 69' c Fickou 79' c Con: Parra (3/3) 32', 35', 67'; Kockott (2/2) 71', 79'; Pen: Parra (1/1) 8'	Report	Try: V. Ursache 74' m Pen: Vlaicu (2/3) 20', 40'

Olympic Stadium, London
Attendance: 50,626
Referee: Jaco Peyper (South Africa)

France	Romania

FB	15	Brice Dulin
RW	14	Sofiane Guitoune
OC	13	Gaël Fickou
IC	12	Wesley Fofana
LW	11	Noa Nakaitaci
FH	10	Rémi Talès
SH	9	Morgan Parra	(substituted off) 68'
N8	8	Louis Picamoles	(substituted off) 50'
OF	7	Fulgence Ouedraogo
BF	6	Yannick Nyanga
RL	5	Alexandre Flanquart
LL	4	Bernard Le Roux
TP	3	Uini Atonio	(substituted off) 50'
HK	2	Dimitri Szarzewski (c)	23' to 32'		(substituted off) 50'
LP	1	Vincent Debaty	(substituted off) 68'
Replacements:
HK	16	Benjamin Kayser	(substituted in) 23'	(substituted off) 32'	(substituted in) 50'
PR	17	Eddy Ben Arous	(substituted in) 68'
PR	18	Nicolas Mas	(substituted in) 50'
LK	19	Yoann Maestri
N8	20	Damien Chouly	(substituted in) 50'
SH	21	Rory Kockott	(substituted in) 68'
FH	22	Frédéric Michalak
CE	23	Mathieu Bastareaud
Coach:
(France) Philippe Saint-André

FB	15	Cătălin Fercu
RW	14	Mădălin Lemnaru
OC	13	Paula Kinikinilau
IC	12	Florin Vlaicu
LW	11	Adrian Apostol		(substituted off) 72'
FH	10	Dănuț Dumbravă		(substituted off) 47'
SH	9	Florin Surugiu		(substituted off) 73'
N8	8	Mihai Macovei (c)
OF	7	Viorel Lucaci		(substituted off) 72'
BF	6	Valentin Ursache		(substituted off) 36'	(substituted in) 40'
RL	5	Johan van Heerden
LL	4	Valentin Popârlan		(substituted off) 68'
TP	3	Paulică Ion	(yellow card) 30'			(substituted off) 73'
HK	2	Otar Turashvili		(substituted off) 59'
LP	1	Mihai Lazăr		(substituted off) 71'
Replacements:
HK	16	Andrei Rădoi		(substituted in) 59'
PR	17	Andrei Ursache		(substituted in) 71'
PR	18	Horațiu Pungea		(substituted in) 36'	(substituted off) 40'	(substituted in) 73'
N8	19	Ovidiu Tonița		(substituted in) 68'
FL	20	Stelian Burcea		(substituted in) 72'
SH	21	Valentin Calafeteanu		(substituted in) 73'
WG	22	Ionuț Botezatu		(substituted in) 72'
CE	23	Csaba Gál		(substituted in) 47'
Coach:
(Wales) Lynn Howells

Man of the Match:
Wesley Fofana (France)

Touch judges:
Craig Joubert (South Africa)
Federico Anselmi (Argentina)
Television match official:
George Ayoub (Australia)

=== Italy vs Canada ===
26 September 2015
14:30

Italy	23–18	Canada
Try: Rizzo 17' c García 58' c Con: Allan (2/2) 18', 59'; Pen: Allan (3/3) 25', 40', 80'	Report	Try: Van der Merwe 15' c Evans 44' m Con: Hirayama (1/2) 16'; Pen: Hirayama (2/3) 14', 72'

Elland Road, Leeds
Attendance: 33,120
Referee: George Clancy (Ireland)

Italy	Canada

FB	15	Luke McLean
RW	14	Leonardo Sarto
OC	13	Tommaso Benvenuti	(substituted off) 59'
IC	12	Gonzalo García	(substituted off) 73'
LW	11	Giovanbattista Venditti
FH	10	Tommaso Allan	(substituted off) 32'	(substituted in) 40'
SH	9	Edoardo Gori
N8	8	Samuela Vunisa	(substituted off) 58'
OF	7	Francesco Minto
BF	6	Alessandro Zanni
RL	5	Joshua Furno
LL	4	Quintin Geldenhuys	(substituted off) 79'
TP	3	Lorenzo Cittadini	(substituted off) 47'
HK	2	Leonardo Ghiraldini (c)	(substituted off) 59'
LP	1	Michele Rizzo	(substituted off) 47'
Replacements:
HK	16	Davide Giazzon	(substituted in) 59'
PR	17	Matías Agüero	(substituted in) 47'
PR	18	Martin Castrogiovanni	(substituted in) 47'
LK	19	Marco Fuser	(substituted in) 79'
FL	20	Mauro Bergamasco	(substituted in) 58'
SH	21	Guglielmo Palazzani	(substituted in) 73'
FH	22	Carlo Canna	(substituted in) 32'	(substituted off) 40'
CE	23	Michele Campagnaro	(substituted in) 59'
Coach:
(France) Jacques Brunel

FB	15	Matt Evans
RW	14	Phil Mackenzie
OC	13	Ciaran Hearn
IC	12	Connor Braid	(substituted off) 14'
LW	11	D. T. H. van der Merwe
FH	10	Nathan Hirayama	(substituted off) 73'
SH	9	Jamie Mackenzie	(substituted off) 56'
N8	8	Tyler Ardron (c)
OF	7	John Moonlight
BF	6	Nanyak Dala	(substituted off) 59'
RL	5	Jamie Cudmore	(substituted off) 72'
LL	4	Jebb Sinclair
TP	3	Doug Wooldridge	(substituted off) 65'
HK	2	Ray Barkwill	(substituted off) 58'
LP	1	Hubert Buydens	(substituted off) 56'
Replacements:
HK	16	Aaron Carpenter	(substituted in) 58'
PR	17	Djustice Sears-Duru	(substituted in) 56'
PR	18	Andrew Tiedemann	(substituted in) 65'
LK	19	Evan Olmstead	(substituted in) 72'
FL	20	Kyle Gilmour	(substituted in) 59'
SH	21	Phil Mack	(substituted in) 56'
CE	22	Conor Trainor	(substituted in) 14'
FB	23	Harry Jones	(substituted in) 73'
Coach:
(New Zealand) Kieran Crowley

Man of the Match:
D. T. H. van der Merwe (Canada)

Touch judges:
Glen Jackson (New Zealand)
Mike Fraser (New Zealand)
Television match official:
George Ayoub (Australia)

Notes:

- Mauro Bergamasco equalled Samoa's Brian Lima record of competing in five consecutive Rugby World Cup tournaments.

=== Ireland vs Romania ===
27 September 2015
16:45

Ireland	44–10	Romania
Try: Bowe (2) 19' c, 62' c Earls (2) 29' m, 44' c Kearney 65' m Henry 74' c Con: Madigan (4/6) 21', 45', 63', 75'; Pen: Madigan (2/2) 8', 18'	Report	Try: Tonița 78' c Con: Vlaicu (1/1) 79'; Pen: Calafeteanu (1/1) 11'

Wembley Stadium, London
Attendance: 89,267
Referee: Craig Joubert (South Africa)

Ireland	Romania

FB	15	Simon Zebo
RW	14	Tommy Bowe
OC	13	Jared Payne	(substituted off) 58'
IC	12	Darren Cave
LW	11	Keith Earls	(substituted off) 49'	(substituted in) 56'	(substituted off) 64'
FH	10	Ian Madigan
SH	9	Eoin Reddan
N8	8	Jamie Heaslip (c)	(substituted off) 60'
OF	7	Chris Henry
BF	6	Jordi Murphy
RL	5	Devin Toner
LL	4	Donnacha Ryan	(substituted off) 64'
TP	3	Nathan White	(substituted off) 64'
HK	2	Richardt Strauss	(substituted off) 60'
LP	1	Cian Healy	(substituted off) 54'
Replacements:
HK	16	Seán Cronin	(substituted in) 60'
PR	17	Jack McGrath	(substituted in) 54'
PR	18	Tadhg Furlong	(substituted in) 64'
LK	19	Paul O'Connell	(substituted in) 64'
FL	20	Seán O'Brien	(substituted in) 60'
SH	21	Conor Murray				(substituted in) 71'
FH	22	Paddy Jackson	(substituted in) 58'
FB	23	Rob Kearney	(substituted in) 49'	(substituted off) 56'	(substituted in) 64'	(substituted off) 71'
Coach:
(New Zealand) Joe Schmidt

FB	15	Cătălin Fercu
RW	14	Adrian Apostol		(substituted off) 54'
OC	13	Paula Kinikinilau
IC	12	Csaba Gál	(yellow card) 61'
LW	11	Ionuț Botezatu
FH	10	Michael Wiringi		(substituted off) 68'
SH	9	Valentin Calafeteanu		(substituted off) 68'
N8	8	Daniel Carpo
OF	7	Mihai Macovei (c)		(substituted off) 68'
BF	6	Viorel Lucaci		(substituted off) 61'
RL	5	Ovidiu Tonița
LL	4	Valentin Popârlan
TP	3	Paulică Ion		(substituted off) 54'
HK	2	Andrei Rădoi		(substituted off) 56'
LP	1	Andrei Ursache		(substituted off) 68'
Replacements:
HK	16	Otar Turashvili		(substituted in) 56'
PR	17	Mihai Lazăr		(substituted in) 68'
PR	18	Alexandru Țăruș		(substituted in) 54'
LK	19	Johan van Heerden		(substituted in) 61'
FL	20	Stelian Burcea		(substituted in) 68'
SH	21	Florin Surugiu		(substituted in) 68'
WG	22	Florin Ioniță		(substituted in) 54'
CE	23	Florin Vlaicu		(substituted in) 68'
Coach:
(Wales) Lynn Howells

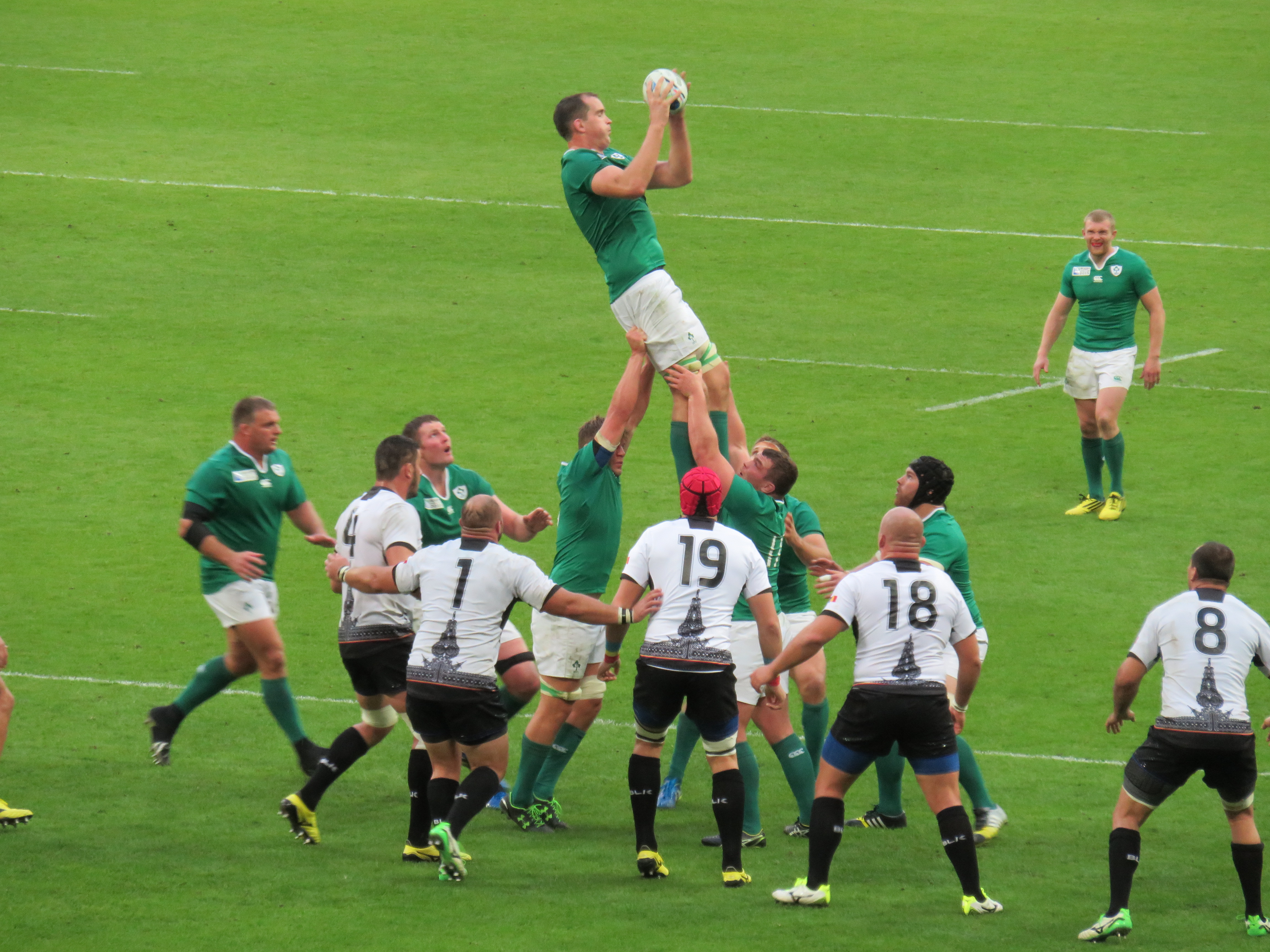

Man of the Match:
Keith Earls (Ireland)

Touch judges:
Romain Poite (France)
Leighton Hodges (Wales)
Television match official:
Shaun Veldsman (South Africa)

Notes:

- The match attendance of 89,267 surpassed the Rugby World Cup's previous record of 89,019, set just seven days earlier during the match between New Zealand and Argentina.
- This was the 300th match in Rugby World Cup history.

=== France vs Canada ===
1 October 2015
20:00

France	41–18	Canada
Try: Fofana 4' c Guirado 28' c Slimani 38' c Papé 67' c Grosso 74' c Con: Michalak (4/4) 5', 30', 39', 67'; Parra (1/1) 76'; Pen: Michalak (2/2) 14', 59'	Report	Try: Van der Merwe 31' c Carpenter 34' m Con: Hirayama (1/2) 32'; Pen: Hirayama (2/2) 42', 56'

Stadium mk, Milton Keynes
Attendance: 28,145
Referee: JP Doyle (England)

France	Canada

FB	15	Scott Spedding
RW	14	Rémy Grosso
OC	13	Mathieu Bastareaud	(substituted off) 70'
IC	12	Wesley Fofana
LW	11	Brice Dulin
FH	10	Frédéric Michalak	(substituted off) 68'
SH	9	Sébastien Tillous-Borde	(substituted off) 59'
N8	8	Damien Chouly	(substituted off) 73'
OF	7	Bernard Le Roux	(substituted off) 68'
BF	6	Thierry Dusautoir (c)
RL	5	Yoann Maestri
LL	4	Pascal Papé
TP	3	Rabah Slimani	(substituted off) 63'
HK	2	Guilhem Guirado	(substituted off) 59'
LP	1	Eddy Ben Arous	(substituted off) 59'
Replacements:
HK	16	Benjamin Kayser	(substituted in) 59'
PR	17	Vincent Debaty	(substituted in) 59'
PR	18	Nicolas Mas	(substituted in) 63'
FL	19	Yannick Nyanga	(substituted in) 68'
FL	20	Fulgence Ouedraogo	(substituted in) 73'
SH	21	Morgan Parra	(substituted in) 59'
FH	22	Rémi Talès	(substituted in) 68'
CE	23	Alexandre Dumoulin	(substituted in) 70'
Coach:
(France) Philippe Saint-André

FB	15	Matt Evans		(substituted off) 37'
RW	14	Phil Mackenzie				(substituted off) 68'
OC	13	Ciaran Hearn
IC	12	Nick Blevins
LW	11	D. T. H. van der Merwe
FH	10	Nathan Hirayama
SH	9	Phil Mack		(substituted off) 66'
N8	8	Tyler Ardron (c)		(substituted off) 19'
OF	7	Richard Thorpe		(substituted off) 48'
BF	6	Kyle Gilmour
RL	5	Jamie Cudmore
LL	4	Brett Beukeboom
TP	3	Doug Wooldridge		(substituted off) 68'
HK	2	Aaron Carpenter		(substituted off) 62'
LP	1	Hubert Buydens		(substituted off) 48'
Replacements:
HK	16	Ray Barkwill		(substituted in) 48'
PR	17	Djustice Sears-Duru		(substituted in) 48'
PR	18	Andrew Tiedemann		(substituted in) 68'
LK	19	Evan Olmstead		(substituted in) 62'
FL	20	Nanyak Dala	(yellow card) 72'	(substituted in) 19'
SH	21	Gordon McRorie		(substituted in) 66'
FB	22	Harry Jones		(substituted in) 37'	64' to 68'
CE	23	Conor Trainor			(substituted in) 64'
Coach:
(New Zealand) Kieran Crowley

Man of the Match:
Frédéric Michalak (France)

Touch judges:
Wayne Barnes (England)
Angus Gardner (Australia)
Television match official:
Graham Hughes (England)

Notes:

- Rémy Grosso (France) made his international debut.

=== Ireland vs Italy ===
4 October 2015
16:45

Ireland	16–9	Italy
Try: Earls 19' c Con: Sexton (1/1) 20'; Pen: Sexton (3/5) 9', 58', 62'	Report	Pen: Allan (3/3) 15', 24', 52'

Olympic Stadium, London
Attendance: 53,187
Referee: Jérôme Garcès (France)

Ireland	Italy

FB	15	Simon Zebo
RW	14	Tommy Bowe
OC	13	Keith Earls		(substituted off) 76'
IC	12	Robbie Henshaw
LW	11	Dave Kearney
FH	10	Johnny Sexton
SH	9	Conor Murray
N8	8	Jamie Heaslip
OF	7	Seán O'Brien		(substituted off) 67'
BF	6	Peter O'Mahony	(yellow card) 72'
RL	5	Paul O'Connell (c)
LL	4	Iain Henderson		(substituted off) 67'
TP	3	Mike Ross		(substituted off) 59'
HK	2	Rory Best		(substituted off) 70'
LP	1	Jack McGrath		(substituted off) 59'
Replacements:
HK	16	Seán Cronin		(substituted in) 70'
PR	17	Cian Healy		(substituted in) 59'
PR	18	Nathan White		(substituted in) 59'
LK	19	Devin Toner		(substituted in) 67'
FL	20	Chris Henry		(substituted in) 67'
SH	21	Eoin Reddan
FH	22	Ian Madigan
WG	23	Luke Fitzgerald		(substituted in) 76'
Coach:
(New Zealand) Joe Schmidt

FB	15	Luke McLean
RW	14	Leonardo Sarto
OC	13	Michele Campagnaro
IC	12	Gonzalo García	(substituted off) 4'
LW	11	Giovanbattista Venditti
FH	10	Tommaso Allan	(substituted off) 65'
SH	9	Edoardo Gori	(substituted off) 76'
N8	8	Sergio Parisse (c)	(substituted off) 65'
OF	7	Simone Favaro	(substituted off) 67'
BF	6	Francesco Minto
RL	5	Joshua Furno
LL	4	Quintin Geldenhuys
TP	3	Lorenzo Cittadini	(substituted off) 62'
HK	2	Andrea Manici	(substituted off) 40'
LP	1	Matías Agüero	(substituted off) 62'	(substituted in) 72'
Replacements:
HK	16	Davide Giazzon	(substituted in) 40'
PR	17	Michele Rizzo	(substituted in) 62'	(substituted off) 72'
PR	18	Dario Chistolini	(substituted in) 62'
FL	19	Alessandro Zanni	(substituted in) 65'
FL	20	Mauro Bergamasco	(substituted in) 67'
SH	21	Guglielmo Palazzani	(substituted in) 76'
FH	22	Carlo Canna	(substituted in) 65'
CE	23	Tommaso Benvenuti	(substituted in) 4'
Coach:
(France) Jacques Brunel

Man of the Match:
Iain Henderson (Ireland)

Touch judges:
Pascal Gaüzère (France)
Angus Gardner (Australia)
Television match official:
Graham Hughes (England)

=== Canada vs Romania ===
6 October 2015
16:45

Canada	15–17	Romania
Try: Van der Merwe 33' m Hassler 44' c Con: Hirayama (1/1) 45'; Pen: McRorie (1/4) 11'	Report	Try: Macovei (2) 53' c, 74' c Con: Vlaicu (2/2) 54', 75'; Pen: Vlaicu (1/3) 78'

Leicester City Stadium, Leicester
Attendance: 27,153
Referee: Wayne Barnes (England)

Canada	Romania

FB	15	Harry Jones		(substituted off) 75'
RW	14	Jeff Hassler
OC	13	Ciaran Hearn
IC	12	Nick Blevins		(substituted off) 50'
LW	11	D. T. H. van der Merwe
FH	10	Nathan Hirayama
SH	9	Gordon McRorie		(substituted off) 50'
N8	8	Aaron Carpenter
OF	7	John Moonlight		(substituted off) 63'
BF	6	Jebb Sinclair	(yellow card) 72'
RL	5	Jamie Cudmore (c)
LL	4	Brett Beukeboom
TP	3	Doug Wooldridge		(substituted off) 68'
HK	2	Ray Barkwill
LP	1	Hubert Buydens		(substituted off) 46'	(substituted off) 54'	(substituted in) 62'
Replacements:
HK	16	Benoît Piffero
PR	17	Djustice Sears-Duru		(substituted in) 46'	(substituted in) 54'	(substituted off) 62'
PR	18	Jake Ilnicki		(substituted in) 68'
FL	19	Kyle Gilmour
FL	20	Nanyak Dala		(substituted in) 63'
SH	21	Phil Mack		(substituted in) 50'
CE	22	Conor Trainor		(substituted in) 50'
FB	23	James Pritchard		(substituted in) 75'
Coach:
(New Zealand) Kieran Crowley

FB	15	Cătălin Fercu	(yellow card) 20'
RW	14	Mădălin Lemnaru
OC	13	Paula Kinikinilau
IC	12	Florin Vlaicu
LW	11	Ionuț Botezatu
FH	10	Michael Wiringi		(substituted off) 52'
SH	9	Florin Surugiu		(substituted off) 23'
N8	8	Mihai Macovei (c)
OF	7	Viorel Lucaci		(substituted off) 77'
BF	6	Valentin Ursache
RL	5	Johan van Heerden
LL	4	Valentin Popârlan
TP	3	Paulică Ion		(substituted off) 46'
HK	2	Otar Turashvili		(substituted off) 66'
LP	1	Mihai Lazăr		(substituted off) 75'
Replacements:
HK	16	Andrei Rădoi		(substituted in) 66'
PR	17	Andrei Ursache		(substituted in) 46'
PR	18	Alexandru Țăruș		(substituted in) 75'
N8	19	Daniel Carpo		(substituted in) 77'
FL	20	Stelian Burcea
SH	21	Valentin Calafeteanu		(substituted in) 23'
WG	22	Adrian Apostol
CE	23	Csaba Gál		(substituted in) 52'
Coach:
(Wales) Lynn Howells

Man of the Match:
Jeff Hassler (Canada)

Touch judges:
Glen Jackson (New Zealand)
Marius Mitrea (Italy)
Television match official:
Ben Skeen (New Zealand)

Notes:

- Mihai Lazăr and Valentin Popârlan (Romania) earned their 50th test caps.
- This match was the biggest comeback in Rugby World Cup history.

=== Italy vs Romania ===
11 October 2015
14:30

Italy	32–22	Romania
Try: Sarto 10' m Gori 24' c Allan 39' c Zanni 46' c Con: Allan (3/4) 25', 40', 48'; Pen: Allan (2/2) 16', 70'	Report	Try: Apostol (2) 66' c, 79' m Popârlan 75' c Con: Vlaicu (2/3) 67', 76'; Pen: Vlaicu (1/1) 5'

Sandy Park, Exeter
Attendance: 11,450
Referee: Romain Poite (France)

Italy	Romania

FB	15	Luke McLean	(substituted off) 64'
RW	14	Leonardo Sarto
OC	13	Michele Campagnaro	(substituted off) 35'
IC	12	Tommaso Benvenuti
LW	11	Giovanbattista Venditti
FH	10	Tommaso Allan
SH	9	Edoardo Gori	(substituted off) 68'
N8	8	Alessandro Zanni
OF	7	Simone Favaro	(substituted off) 64'
BF	6	Francesco Minto
RL	5	Joshua Furno	(substituted off) 75'
LL	4	Quintin Geldenhuys (c)
TP	3	Lorenzo Cittadini	(substituted off) 56'
HK	2	Andrea Manici	(substituted off) 56'
LP	1	Matías Agüero	(substituted off) 56'
Replacements:
HK	16	Davide Giazzon	(substituted in) 56'
PR	17	Alberto De Marchi	(substituted in) 56'
PR	18	Dario Chistolini	(substituted in) 56'
LK	19	Valerio Bernabò	(substituted in) 75'
FL	20	Samuela Vunisa	(substituted in) 64'
SH	21	Guglielmo Palazzani	(substituted in) 64'
FH	22	Carlo Canna	(substituted in) 68'
CE	23	Enrico Bacchin	(substituted in) 35'
Coach:
(France) Jacques Brunel

FB	15	Cătălin Fercu
RW	14	Mădălin Lemnaru
OC	13	Paula Kinikinilau
IC	12	Florin Vlaicu
LW	11	Ionuț Botezatu		(substituted off) 64'
FH	10	Michael Wiringi		(substituted off) 40'
SH	9	Valentin Calafeteanu		(substituted off) 60'
N8	8	Daniel Carpo
OF	7	Viorel Lucaci			(substituted off) 56'
BF	6	Valentin Ursache (c)		48' to 56'
RL	5	Johan van Heerden	(yellow card) 16'	(substituted off) 55'
LL	4	Valentin Popârlan
TP	3	Paulică Ion		(substituted off) 40'
HK	2	Otar Turashvili		(substituted off) 58'
LP	1	Mihai Lazăr		(substituted off) 66'
Replacements:
HK	16	Andrei Rădoi		(substituted in) 58'
PR	17	Andrei Ursache		(substituted in) 40'
PR	18	Horațiu Pungea		(substituted in) 66'
LK	19	Marius Antonescu		(substituted in) 55'
FL	20	Stelian Burcea		(substituted in) 48'
SH	21	Tudorel Bratu		(substituted in) 60'
WG	22	Adrian Apostol		(substituted in) 64'
CE	23	Csaba Gál		(substituted in) 40'
Coach:
(Wales) Lynn Howells

Man of the Match:
Edoardo Gori (Italy)

Touch judges:
George Clancy (Ireland)
Mathieu Raynal (France)
Television match official:
Ben Skeen (New Zealand)

Notes:

- Andrei Rădoi (Romania) earned his 50th test cap.
- Tudorel Bratu (Romania) made his international debut.

=== France vs Ireland ===
11 October 2015
16:45

France	9–24	Ireland
Pen: Spedding (2/3) 16', 23'; Parra (1/1) 64'	Report	Try: R. Kearney 50' m Murray 72' c Con: Madigan (1/2) 73'; Pen: Sexton (2/2) 13', 19'; Madigan (2/2) 29', 77'

Millennium Stadium, Cardiff
Attendance: 72,163
Referee: Nigel Owens (Wales)

France	Ireland

FB	15	Scott Spedding
RW	14	Noa Nakaitaci
OC	13	Mathieu Bastareaud	(substituted off) 62'
IC	12	Wesley Fofana
LW	11	Brice Dulin
FH	10	Frédéric Michalak	(substituted off) 55'
SH	9	Sébastien Tillous-Borde	(substituted off) 55'
N8	8	Louis Picamoles
OF	7	Damien Chouly	(substituted off) 55'
BF	6	Thierry Dusautoir (c)
RL	5	Yoann Maestri
LL	4	Pascal Papé	(substituted off) 73'
TP	3	Rabah Slimani	(substituted off) 64'
HK	2	Guilhem Guirado	(substituted off) 59'
LP	1	Eddy Ben Arous	(substituted off) 43'	(substituted in) 48'	(substituted off) 65'
Replacements:
HK	16	Benjamin Kayser	(substituted in) 59'
PR	17	Vincent Debaty	(substituted in) 43'	(substituted off) 48'	(substituted in) 65'
PR	18	Nicolas Mas	(substituted in) 64'
LK	19	Alexandre Flanquart	(substituted in) 73'
FL	20	Bernard Le Roux	(substituted in) 55'
SH	21	Morgan Parra	(substituted in) 55'
FH	22	Rémi Talès	(substituted in) 55'
CE	23	Alexandre Dumoulin	(substituted in) 62'
Coach:
(France) Philippe Saint-André

FB	15	Rob Kearney
RW	14	Tommy Bowe
OC	13	Keith Earls	(substituted off) 62'
IC	12	Robbie Henshaw
LW	11	Dave Kearney
FH	10	Johnny Sexton	(substituted off) 26'
SH	9	Conor Murray	(substituted off) 77'
N8	8	Jamie Heaslip
OF	7	Seán O'Brien
BF	6	Peter O'Mahony	(substituted off) 55'
RL	5	Paul O'Connell (c)	(substituted off) 40'
LL	4	Devin Toner
TP	3	Mike Ross	(substituted off) 65'
HK	2	Rory Best	(substituted off) 73'
LP	1	Cian Healy	(substituted off) 57'
Replacements:
HK	16	Richardt Strauss	(substituted in) 73'
PR	17	Jack McGrath	(substituted in) 57'
PR	18	Nathan White	(substituted in) 65'
LK	19	Iain Henderson	(substituted in) 40'
FL	20	Chris Henry	(substituted in) 55'
SH	21	Eoin Reddan	(substituted in) 77'
FH	22	Ian Madigan	(substituted in) 26'
WG	23	Luke Fitzgerald	(substituted in) 62'
Coach:
(New Zealand) Joe Schmidt

Man of the Match:
Seán O'Brien (Ireland)

Touch judges:
Wayne Barnes (England)
Leighton Hodges (Wales)
Television match official:
Graham Hughes (England)

Notes:

- Louis Picamoles (France) earned his 50th test cap.
