= Ursache =

Ursache is a surname. Notable people with the surname include:

- Andrei Ursache (born 1984), Romanian rugby union player
- Valentin Ursache (born 1985), Romanian rugby union player
