= 2013 France rugby union tour of New Zealand =

- Coach: Philippe Saint-André
- Tour captain: Thierry Dusautoir
- Top point scorer: Jean-Marc Doussain (24)
- Top try scorer: Noa Nakaitaci (2)
- Top test point scorer: Jean-Marc Doussain (6)
- Top test try scorer: Wesley Fofana (1)
Summary
P	W	D	L
Total
4	1	0	3
Test match
3	0	0	3
Opponent
P	W	D	L
New Zealand
3	0	0	3

Tour chronology
- ← Argentina 2012 Australia 2014 →

In June 2013, France played a three-test series against New Zealand as part of the 2013 mid-year rugby test series. This was the sides' first encounter since they met in the 2011 Rugby World Cup final, which New Zealand won 8–7. It was France's first test series against the All Blacks since their 2009 two-test tour of New Zealand, which ended in a 1–1 draw.

The tour began at the stadium where they last played each other, Eden Park in Auckland on 8 June. Following this, they played a mid-week match against the Auckland Super Rugby franchise, the Blues, at North Harbour Stadium in Auckland on 11 June. The second test was played in Christchurch at Rugby League Park on 15 June, and the third test at Yarrow Stadium in New Plymouth on 22 June.

== Fixtures ==
Date	Venue	Home	Score	Away
8 June 2013	Eden Park, Auckland	New Zealand	23–13	France
11 June 2013	North Harbour Stadium, Auckland	Blues (New Zealand)	15–38	France
15 June 2013	Rugby League Park, Christchurch	New Zealand	30–0	France
22 June 2013	Yarrow Stadium, New Plymouth	New Zealand	24-9	France

== Squads ==
=== France ===
On 14 May, head coach Philippe Saint-André named a 35-man squad for the fixtures against New Zealand and the Blues. The selection created controversy when South African-born prop Daniel Kötze and flank Bernard Le Roux and Fijian-born wing Noa Nakaitaci (qualifying on residency grounds) were chosen ahead of in-form French-born players. The most notable absentees were wing Vincent Clerc (injured with his club), captain and lock Pascal Papé (injured during the Six Nations Championship) and fly-half François Trinh-Duc (deemed out of form, with Camille Lopez and Rémi Talès chosen ahead of him).

Wing Alexis Palisson withdrew from the squad due to injury and was replaced with Marc Andreu prior to the first test. Injured during the first test, flank Fulgence Ouedraogo also withdrew from the tour and was replaced in the squad by Damien Chouly.

Head coach: Philippe Saint-André

- Caps and ages are to first Test (8 June 2013)

Note: Flags indicate national union for the club/province as defined by World Rugby.

Player	Position	Date of birth (age)	Caps	Club/province
Guilhem Guirado	Hooker	17 June 1986 (aged 26)	17	(France) Perpignan
Benjamin Kayser	Hooker	26 July 1984 (aged 28)	17	(France) Clermont
Dimitri Szarzewski	Hooker	26 January 1983 (aged 30)	69	(France) Racing Métro
Eddy Ben Arous	Prop	25 August 1990 (aged 22)	0	(France) Racing Métro
Vincent Debaty	Prop	2 October 1981 (aged 31)	16	(France) Clermont
Thomas Domingo	Prop	20 August 1985 (aged 27)	24	(France) Clermont
Luc Ducalcon	Prop	2 January 1984 (aged 29)	14	(France) Racing Métro
Daniel Kötze	Prop	28 March 1987 (aged 26)	0	(France) Clermont
Nicolas Mas	Prop	23 May 1980 (aged 33)	61	(France) Perpignan
Alexandre Flanquart	Lock	9 October 1989 (aged 23)	0	(France) Stade Français
Yoann Maestri	Lock	14 January 1988 (aged 25)	14	(France) Toulouse
Christophe Samson	Lock	1 March 1984 (aged 29)	4	(France) Castres
Sébastien Vahaamahina	Lock	21 October 1991 (aged 21)	3	(France) Perpignan
Damien Chouly*	Flanker	27 November 1985 (aged 27)	9	(France) Clermont
Thierry Dusautoir (c)	Flanker	18 November 1981 (aged 31)	59	(France) Toulouse
Bernard Le Roux	Flanker	4 June 1989 (aged 24)	0	(France) Racing Métro
Yannick Nyanga	Flanker	19 December 1983 (aged 29)	31	(France) Toulouse
Fulgence Ouedraogo*	Flanker	21 July 1986 (aged 26)	32	(France) Montpellier
Antonie Claassen	Number 8	20 October 1984 (aged 28)	3	(France) Castres
Louis Picamoles	Number 8	5 February 1986 (aged 27)	36	(France) Toulouse
Jean-Marc Doussain	Scrum-half	12 February 1991 (aged 22)	1	(France) Toulouse
Maxime Machenaud	Scrum-half	30 December 1988 (aged 24)	8	(France) Racing Métro
Camille Lopez	Fly-half	3 April 1989 (aged 24)	0	(France) Bordeaux Bègles
Frédéric Michalak	Fly-half	16 October 1982 (aged 30)	64	(France) Toulon
Rémi Talès	Fly-half	2 May 1984 (aged 29)	0	(France) Castres
Mathieu Bastareaud	Centre	17 September 1988 (aged 24)	14	(France) Toulon
Gaël Fickou	Centre	27 March 1994 (aged 19)	1	(France) Toulouse
Wesley Fofana	Centre	20 January 1988 (aged 25)	15	(France) Clermont
Florian Fritz	Centre	17 January 1984 (aged 29)	29	(France) Toulouse
Maxime Mermoz	Centre	28 July 1986 (aged 26)	24	(France) Toulon
Marc Andreu	Wing	27 December 1985 (aged 27)	6	(France) Castres
Maxime Médard	Wing	18 November 1986 (aged 26)	32	(France) Toulouse
Noa Nakaitaci	Wing	11 July 1990 (aged 22)	0	(France) Clermont
Adrien Planté	Wing	25 April 1985 (aged 28)	0	(France) Perpignan
Yoann Huget	Wing	2 June 1987 (aged 26)	17	(France) Toulouse
Brice Dulin	Fullback	13 April 1990 (aged 23)	5	(France) Castres

Note*: Chouly joined the squad between the first two tests after Ouedraogo came off injured in the first test.

=== New Zealand ===
New Zealand 32-man squad for the 2013 mid-year series to be played against France. The squad includes Matt Todd, who is included as injury cover for Sam Whitelock—who is not expected to be available until the third Test. All players play Super Rugby and provincial rugby within New Zealand.

Prop Joe Moody was added to the squad as prop cover should all the original props not be available for the first test.

- Head coach: (New Zealand) Steve Hansen
- Caps and ages are to first Test (8 June 2013)

Note: Flags indicate national union for the club/province as defined by World Rugby.

Player	Position	Date of birth (age)	Caps	Club/province
Dane Coles	Hooker	10 December 1986 (aged 26)	4	(New Zealand) Hurricanes
Andrew Hore	Hooker	13 September 1978 (aged 34)	74	(New Zealand) Highlanders
Keven Mealamu	Hooker	20 March 1979 (aged 34)	102	(New Zealand) Blues
Ben Afeaki	Prop	12 January 1988 (aged 25)	0	(New Zealand) Chiefs
Wyatt Crockett	Prop	24 January 1983 (aged 30)	11	(New Zealand) Crusaders
Ben Franks	Prop	27 March 1984 (aged 29)	23	(New Zealand) Hurricanes
Owen Franks	Prop	23 December 1987 (aged 25)	45	(New Zealand) Crusaders
Joe Moody	Prop	18 September 1988 (aged 24)	0	(New Zealand) Crusaders
Tony Woodcock	Prop	27 January 1981 (aged 32)	96	(New Zealand) Highlanders
Brodie Retallick	Lock	31 May 1991 (aged 22)	13	(New Zealand) Chiefs
Luke Romano	Lock	16 February 1986 (aged 27)	11	(New Zealand) Crusaders
Jeremy Thrush	Lock	19 April 1985 (aged 28)	0	(New Zealand) Hurricanes
Sam Whitelock	Lock	12 October 1988 (aged 24)	39	(New Zealand) Crusaders
Sam Cane	Flanker	13 January 1992 (aged 21)	5	(New Zealand) Chiefs
Steve Luatua	Flanker	29 April 1991 (aged 22)	0	(New Zealand) Blues
Liam Messam	Flanker	25 March 1984 (aged 29)	20	(New Zealand) Chiefs
Matt Todd	Flanker	24 March 1988 (aged 25)	0	(New Zealand) Crusaders
Kieran Read (c)	Number 8	26 October 1985 (aged 27)	48	(New Zealand) Crusaders
Victor Vito	Number 8	27 March 1987 (aged 26)	20	(New Zealand) Hurricanes
Tawera Kerr-Barlow	Scrum-half	15 August 1990 (aged 22)	2	(New Zealand) Chiefs
Aaron Smith	Scrum-half	21 November 1988 (aged 24)	13	(New Zealand) Highlanders
Piri Weepu	Scrum-half	7 September 1983 (aged 29)	69	(New Zealand) Blues
Beauden Barrett	Fly-half	27 May 1991 (aged 22)	5	(New Zealand) Hurricanes
Dan Carter	Fly-half	5 March 1982 (aged 31)	94	(New Zealand) Crusaders
Aaron Cruden	Fly-half	8 January 1989 (aged 24)	20	(New Zealand) Chiefs
Ma'a Nonu	Centre	21 May 1982 (aged 31)	76	(New Zealand) Highlanders
Rene Ranger	Centre	30 September 1986 (aged 26)	3	(New Zealand) Blues
Francis Saili	Centre	16 February 1991 (aged 22)	0	(New Zealand) Blues
Conrad Smith	Centre	12 October 1981 (aged 31)	66	(New Zealand) Hurricanes
Charles Piutau	Wing	31 October 1991 (aged 21)	0	(New Zealand) Blues
Julian Savea	Wing	7 August 1990 (aged 22)	9	(New Zealand) Hurricanes
Israel Dagg	Fullback	6 June 1988 (aged 25)	25	(New Zealand) Crusaders
Ben Smith	Fullback	1 June 1986 (aged 27)	12	(New Zealand) Highlanders

== Background ==
Following their later encounter in the 2011 Rugby World Cup final France and New Zealand had different fortunes.

France, under the leadership of newly appointed head coach Philippe Saint-André, endured a mixed 2012 Six Nations Championship (ending 4th with 2 wins, 1 draw and 2 losses) which was the last outing of several key figures of the squad with the likes of Julien Bonnaire, Imanol Harinordoquy, Lionel Nallet, Jean-Baptiste Poux, Aurélien Rougerie, William Servat and Dimitri Yachvili playing their last games in the France jersey while only a couple of players (Wesley Fofana and Yoann Maestri) received their first caps. The Summer tour of Argentina then marked the rise of new players like Brice Dulin, Maxime Machenaud, Fofana and Maestri and saw the return in the mix of Thomas Domingo (who had missed on the World Cup due to injury), Yoann Huget (who had missed on the World Cup due to suspension) and Frédéric Michalak (back from his stint in Super Rugby after having fallen out of favour of French rugby) while experienced players like Vincent Clerc and Thierry Dusautoir were rested, the captaincy being handed to Pascal Papé. The Series was drawn 1-1. France then ended 2012 on a high with three straight wins in the Autumn Internationals over Australia, Argentina and Samoa, claiming the fourth spot in the IRB World Rankings which gave them First Seed status for the 2015 Rugby World Cup draw thus avoiding New Zealand, Australia and South Africa at pool stage. However the 2013 Six Nations Championship was a real disappointment as France ended up bottom of the table, claiming only one win and a draw with a squad that had not much evolved since the previous Summer - Antonie Claassen, Gaël Fickou, Jocelino Suta and Sébastien Vahaamahina being the only new caps while long-time absentees Mathieu Bastareaud and Yannick Nyanga were recalled. Philippe Saint-André stated that the Top 14 final being played just one week prior to the first test, players taking part in this final and thus joining the squad late would not feature in the first test.

New Zealand also started 2012 with a new head coach with former assistant coach Steve Hansen taking over Graham Henry's role. The All Blacks whitewashed Ireland during their Summer tour, winning the series 3-0 with a remarkable 60-0 victory in the third Test, their largest ever winning margin over Ireland. New Zealand followed with a perfect 2012 Rugby Championship - which featured Argentina for the first time - winning all six of their games. However their traditional Bledisloe Cup match in October put an end to their 16-game winning streak when they drew (18-18) with Australia. The All Blacks went on to hammer Scotland, Italy and Wales (scoring 30+ points each time) in the end-of-year tests before suffering their first defeat in two years at the hands of England on December 1. New Zealand however remained on top of the IRB World Rankings and were given Top Seed status for the 2015 Rugby World Cup. Starting in January 2013, stalwart All Blacks captain Richie McCaw was granted a six-month sabbatical from rugby to try and extend his career up to the 2015 World Cup. He has thus not taken any part in the 2013 Super Rugby campaign nor will he take part in the mid-year tests series against France. He is due to resume his international career in the 2013 Rugby Championship after a few stints with his Christchurch club side.

== Matches ==
8 June 2013
19:35 NZST (UTC+12)

New Zealand	23–13	France
Try: A. Smith 32' c Cane 37' c Con: Cruden (2/2) 33', 38; Pen: Cruden (3/6) 21', 60', 74'	Report	Try: Fofana 9' c Con: Machenaud (1/1) 10'; Pen: Machenaud (1/2) 35'; Lopez (1/1) 46'

Eden Park, Auckland
Attendance: 45,561
Referee: Wayne Barnes (England)

FB	15	Israel Dagg	(substituted off) 66'
RW	14	Ben Smith
OC	13	Conrad Smith
IC	12	Ma'a Nonu
LW	11	Julian Savea
FH	10	Aaron Cruden	(substituted off) 74'
SH	9	Aaron Smith	(substituted off) 65'
N8	8	Kieran Read (c)
OF	7	Sam Cane
BF	6	Liam Messam
RL	5	Brodie Retallick
LL	4	Luke Romano
TP	3	Owen Franks	(substituted off) 60'
HK	2	Dane Coles	(substituted off) 55'
LP	1	Wyatt Crockett	(substituted off) 74'
Replacements:
HK	16	Keven Mealamu	(substituted in) 55'
PR	17	Ben Franks	(substituted in) 60'
PR	18	Ben Afeaki	(substituted in) 74'
LK	19	Jeremy Thrush
FL	20	Victor Vito
SH	21	Tawera Kerr-Barlow	(substituted in) 65'
FH	22	Beauden Barrett	(substituted in) 74'
CE	23	Rene Ranger	(substituted in) 66'
Coach:
(New Zealand) Steve Hansen

FB	15	Yoann Huget
RW	14	Adrien Planté
OC	13	Florian Fritz	(substituted off) 69'
IC	12	Wesley Fofana
LW	11	Maxime Médard
FH	10	Camille Lopez	(substituted off) 65'
SH	9	Maxime Machenaud	(substituted off) 42'
N8	8	Louis Picamoles
OF	7	Fulgence Ouedraogo	(substituted off) 36'
BF	6	Thierry Dusautoir (c)
RL	5	Yoann Maestri	(substituted off) 70'
LL	4	Sébastien Vahaamahina
TP	3	Luc Ducalcon	(substituted off) 51'
HK	2	Dimitri Szarzewski	(substituted off) 57'
LP	1	Thomas Domingo	(substituted off) 51'
Replacements:
HK	16	Guilhem Guirado	(substituted in) 57'
PR	17	Vincent Debaty	(substituted in) 51'
PR	18	Daniel Kötze	(substituted in) 51'
LK	19	Alexandre Flanquart	(substituted in) 70'
FL	20	Yannick Nyanga	(substituted in) 36'
SH	21	Jean-Marc Doussain	(substituted in) 42'
FH	22	Frédéric Michalak	(substituted in) 65'
CE	23	Maxime Mermoz	(substituted in) 69'
Coach:
(France) Philippe Saint-André

Man of the Match:
Ben Smith (New Zealand)

Touch judges:
Alain Rolland (Ireland)
James Leckie (Australia)
Television match official:
Matt Goddard (Australia)

- Ben Afeaki earned his first full international cap for New Zealand
- Alexandre Flanquart, Daniel Kötze, Camille Lopez and Adrien Planté earned their first full international caps for France.

11 June 2013
19:05 NZST (UTC+12)

Blues (New Zealand)	15–38	France
Try: Parsons 57' m Moala 62' c Con: McKenzie (1/2) 63'; Pen: Kerr (1/1) 2'	Report	Try: Fickou 44' c Nakaitaci 48' c, 51' m Kayser 66' c Con: Doussain (3/4) 45', 49', 67'; Pen: Doussain (4/5) 4', 10', 21', 24'

North Harbour Stadium, Auckland
Referee: Jaco Peyper (South Africa)

FB	15	Marty McKenzie
RW	14	Frank Halai
OC	13	Malakai Fekitoa
IC	12	Jackson Willison
LW	11	George Moala
FH	10	Baden Kerr	(substituted off) 17'
SH	9	Jamison Gibson-Park	(substituted off) 52'
N8	8	Peter Saili
OF	7	Brendon O'Connor
BF	6	Kane Barrett	(substituted off) 43'
RL	5	Culum Retallick
LL	4	Anthony Boric	(substituted off) 50'
TP	3	Ofa Tu'ungafasi	(substituted off) 57'	(substituted in) 72'
HK	2	James Parsons (c)	(substituted off) 66'
LP	1	Sam Prattley		(substituted off) 72'
Replacements:
HK	16	Quentin MacDonald	(substituted in) 66'
PR	17	Angus Ta'avao	(substituted in) 57'
LK	18	Liaki Moli	(substituted in) 50'
LK	19	Ronald Raaymakers
FL	20	Sean Polwart	(substituted in) 43'
FH	21	Chris Noakes	(substituted in) 17'	(substituted off) 52'
CE	22	Tevita Li		(substituted in) 52'
SH	23	Wayne Ngaluafe	(substituted in) 52'
Coach:
(New Zealand) Sir John Kirwan

FB	15	Maxime Médard	(substituted off) 50'
RW	14	Noa Nakaitaci
OC	13	Gaël Fickou
IC	12	Maxime Mermoz
LW	11	Marc Andreu
FH	10	Rémi Talès	(substituted off) 47'
SH	9	Jean-Marc Doussain	(substituted off) 68'
N8	8	Antonie Claassen
OF	7	Bernard Le Roux	(substituted off) 52'
BF	6	Yannick Nyanga (c)	(substituted off) 50'
RL	5	Alexandre Flanquart
LL	4	Christophe Samson	(substituted off) 60'
TP	3	Nicolas Mas	(substituted off) 52'
HK	2	Guilhem Guirado
LP	1	Eddy Ben Arous	(substituted off) 57'
Replacements:
HK	16	Benjamin Kayser	(substituted in) 50'
PR	17	Vincent Debaty	(substituted in) 57'
PR	18	Daniel Kötze	(substituted in) 52'
LK	19	Sébastien Vahaamahina	(substituted in) 60'
N8	20	Damien Chouly	(substituted in) 52'
SH	21	Frédéric Michalak	(substituted in) 47'
FH	22	Camille Lopez	(substituted in) 68'
FB	23	Brice Dulin	(substituted in) 50'
Coach:
(France) Philippe Saint-André

Touch judges:
Richard Kelly (New Zealand)
Sheldon Eden-Whaitiri (New Zealand)
Television match official:
Glenn Newman (New Zealand)

- Eddy Ben Arous, Bernard Le Roux, Noa Nakaitaci and Rémi Talès made their first senior appearance for France. However, as the match was not granted Test status, they remained uncapped.
- Having represented New Zealand on 24 occasions, Anthony Boric was the only full international among the Blues team.

15 June 2013
19:35 NZST (UTC+12)

New Zealand	30–0	France
Try: Savea 3', c B Smith 48' c Barrett 76' c Con: Cruden (3/3) 4', 49', 77'; Pen: Cruden (3/4) 22', 54', 64'	Report

Rugby League Park, Christchurch
Referee: Alain Rolland (Ireland)

FB	15	Israel Dagg
RW	14	Ben Smith	(substituted off) 75'
OC	13	Conrad Smith
IC	12	Ma'a Nonu
LW	11	Julian Savea	(substituted off) 59'
FH	10	Aaron Cruden
SH	9	Aaron Smith	(substituted off) 59'
N8	8	Kieran Read (c)
OF	7	Sam Cane
BF	6	Liam Messam	(substituted off) 62'
RL	5	Sam Whitelock	(substituted off) 68'
LL	4	Luke Romano
TP	3	Owen Franks	(substituted off) 68'
HK	2	Dane Coles	(substituted off) 58'
LP	1	Wyatt Crockett	(substituted off) 62'
Replacements:
HK	16	Andrew Hore	(substituted in) 58'
PR	17	Tony Woodcock	(substituted in) 62'
PR	18	Ben Franks	(substituted in) 68'
LK	19	Jeremy Thrush	(substituted in) 68'
FL	20	Victor Vito	(substituted in) 62'
SH	21	Piri Weepu	(substituted in) 59'
FH	22	Beauden Barrett	(substituted in) 75'
CE	23	Rene Ranger	(substituted in) 59'
Coach:
(New Zealand) Steve Hansen

FB	15	Maxime Médard	(substituted off) 40'
RW	14	Adrien Planté
OC	13	Florian Fritz	(substituted off) 59'
IC	12	Wesley Fofana
LW	11	Yoann Huget
FH	10	Frédéric Michalak
SH	9	Maxime Machenaud	(substituted off) 64'
N8	8	Louis Picamoles	(substituted off) 53'
OF	7	Bernard Le Roux
BF	6	Thierry Dusautoir (c)
RL	5	Yoann Maestri
LL	4	Christophe Samson	(substituted off) 64'
TP	3	Nicolas Mas	(substituted off) 67'
HK	2	Dimitri Szarzewski	(substituted off) 50'
LP	1	Thomas Domingo	(substituted off) 67'
Replacements:
HK	16	Benjamin Kayser	(substituted in) 50'
PR	17	Vincent Debaty	(substituted in) 67'
PR	18	Luc Ducalcon	(substituted in) 67'
LK	19	Sébastien Vahaamahina	(substituted in) 64'
FL	20	Yannick Nyanga	(substituted in) 53'
FB	21	Brice Dulin	(substituted in) 40'
FH	22	Rémi Talès	(substituted in) 64'
CE	23	Mathieu Bastareaud	(substituted in) 59'
Coach:
(France) Philippe Saint-André

Touch judges:
Wayne Barnes (England)
James Leckie (Australia)
Television match official:
George Ayoub (Australia)

Notes:

- Kieran Read (New Zealand) earned his 50th cap in this match.
- Jeremy Thrush (New Zealand), Bernard Le Roux and Rémi Talès (both France) made their international debuts.
- This was the first time New Zealand kept a clean sheet against France.
- New Zealand took an unassailable 2–0 lead in the test series.

22 June 2013
19:35 NZST (UTC+12)

New Zealand	24–9	France
Try: B Smith 35' m Barrett 80'; Con: Carter (1/2) 80+1'; Pen: Carter (4/6) 15', 49', 58', 72'	Report	Pen: Doussain (2/4) 39', 45'; Drop: Fritz 7'

Yarrow Stadium, New Plymouth
Referee: Nigel Owens (Wales)

FB	15	Israel Dagg
RW	14	Ben Smith
OC	13	Conrad Smith
IC	12	Ma'a Nonu	(substituted off) 77'
LW	11	Rene Ranger	(substituted off) 72'
FH	10	Dan Carter
SH	9	Piri Weepu	(substituted off) 41'
N8	8	Kieran Read (c)
OF	7	Sam Cane	(substituted off) 72'
BF	6	Victor Vito	(substituted off) 70'
RL	5	Sam Whitelock
LL	4	Luke Romano
TP	3	Owen Franks
HK	2	Andrew Hore	(substituted off) 63'
LP	1	Wyatt Crockett	(substituted off) 41'
Replacements:
HK	16	Keven Mealamu	(substituted in) 63'
PR	17	Tony Woodcock	(substituted in) 41'
PR	18	Ben Franks
FL	19	Steve Luatua	(substituted in) 70'
N8	20	Matt Todd	(substituted in) 72'
SH	21	Tawera Kerr-Barlow	(substituted in) 41'
FH	22	Beauden Barrett	(substituted in) 77'
WG	23	Charles Piutau	(substituted in) 72'
Coach:
(New Zealand) Steve Hansen

FB	15	Brice Dulin
RW	14	Marc Andreu
OC	13	Florian Fritz				(substituted off) 63'
IC	12	Wesley Fofana
LW	11	Yoann Huget		3' to 9'
FH	10	Rémi Talès		(substituted off) 72'
SH	9	Jean-Marc Doussain		(substituted off) 58'
N8	8	Antonie Claassen		(substituted off) 72'
OF	7	Damien Chouly
BF	6	Thierry Dusautoir (c)
RL	5	Yoann Maestri	(yellow card) 71' to end'
LL	4	Alexandre Flanquart		(substituted off) 58'
TP	3	Nicolas Mas		(substituted off) 64'
HK	2	Benjamin Kayser		(substituted off) 64'
LP	1	Thomas Domingo		(substituted off) 64'
Replacements:
HK	16	Dimitri Szarzewski		(substituted in) 64'
PR	17	Eddy Ben Arous		(substituted in) 64'
PR	18	Luc Ducalcon		(substituted in) 64'
LK	19	Sébastien Vahaamahina		(substituted in) 58'
FL	20	Bernard Le Roux		(substituted in) 72'
SH	21	Maxime Machenaud		(substituted in) 58'
FH	22	Camille Lopez		(substituted in) 72'
CE	23	Mathieu Bastareaud		(substituted in) 3'	(substituted off) 9'	(substituted in) 63'
Coach:
(France) Philippe Saint-André

Touch judges:
Alain Rolland (Ireland)
Wayne Barnes (England)
Television match official:
George Ayoub (Australia)

Notes:

- Eddy Ben Arous earned his first full international cap for France in this match.
- Steve Luatua, Charles Piutau and Matt Todd earned their first full international caps for New Zealand in this match.
- Joe Moody and Francis Saili of New Zealand and Noa Nakaitaci of France failed to appear in any of the Tests thus remaining uncapped at the end of the tour.
- Having won the third Test, the All Blacks completed the tour clean sweep.

== Aftermath ==
Following the tour the All Blacks went on to record a perfect 2013 Rugby Championship against Argentina, Australia and South Africa with six wins out of six matches for the second time in a row in as many instances of the competition.

During the end-of-year internationals they went on to beat successively Australia, Japan, France, England and Ireland thus finishing 2013 undefeated with 14 wins out of 14 matches, the first national team to ever achieve this feat in the professional era.

After suffering their fourth defeat at the hands of New Zealand in the same year in their first match of the end-of-year internationals, France overcame Tonga before losing to South Africa thus finishing the year with only two wins out of eleven matches.

France then experienced a mixed 2014 Six Nations Championship with three wins (against England and Italy at home and Scotland away) and two losses (to Wales away and Ireland at home), ending up fourth.

During the 2014 mid-year internationals New Zealand hosted England while France toured Australia.

== See also ==
- History of rugby union matches between France and New Zealand
- 2013 mid-year rugby test series
