= Cucova =

Cucova may refer to several villages in Romania:

- Cucova, a village in Valea Seacă, Bacău
- Cucova, a village in Strunga Commune, Iaşi County
