= Eddy Ben Arous =

France international rugby union player

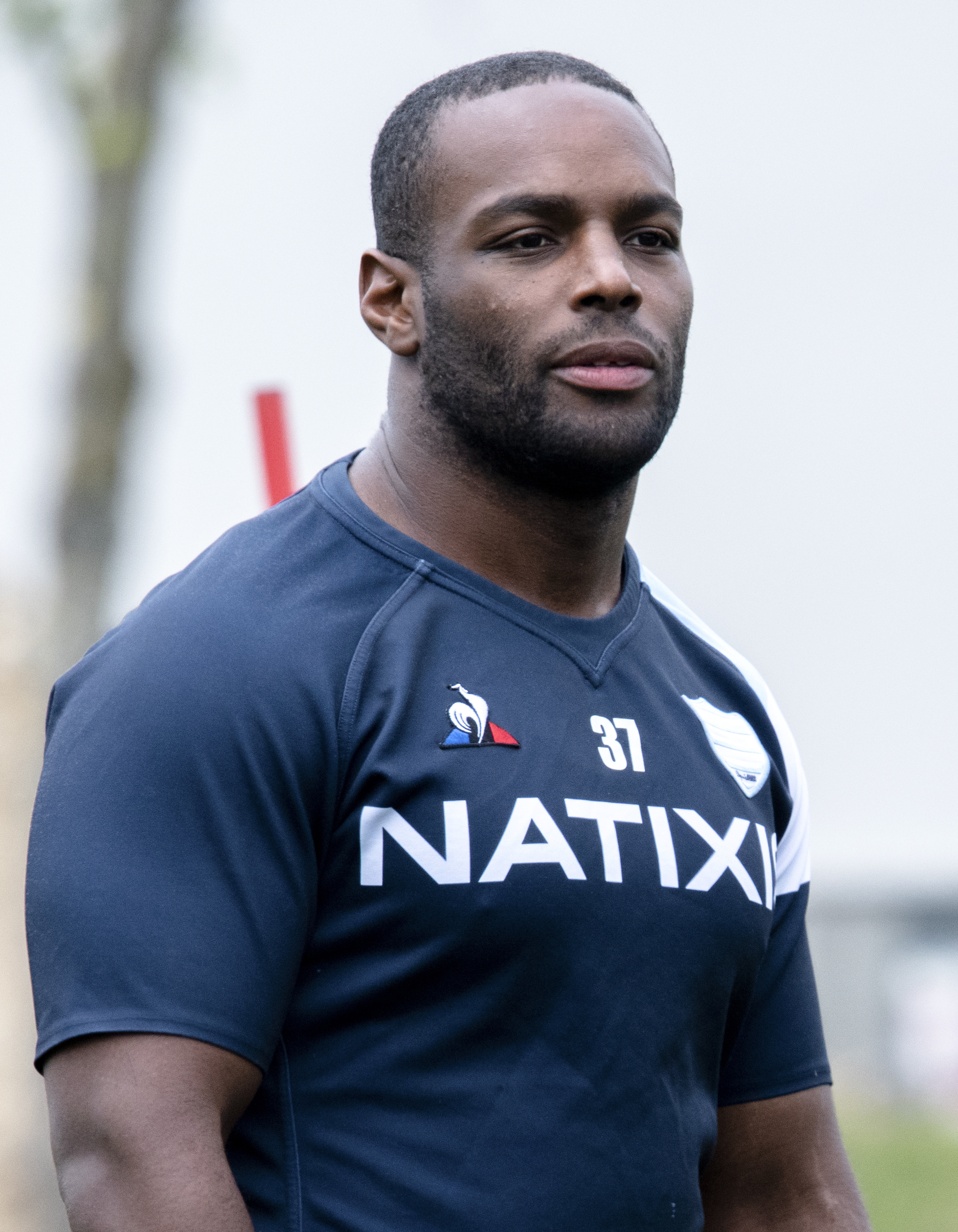
- Ben Arous training with Racing 92 in 2019
- Born: 25 August 1990 (age 36) Nice, France
- Height: 1.83 m (6 ft 0 in)
- Weight: 117 kg (18 st 6 lb; 258 lb)

Rugby union career
- Position: Loosehead prop
Youth career
- 1999-2004: Rugby Trappes
- 2004-2005: Dreux
- 2005-2008: US Tours Rugby
- 2008-2010: Racing 92
Senior career
Years	Team	Apps	(Points)
2010–	Racing 92	307	(35)
- Correct as of 15 February 2025
International career
Years	Team	Apps	(Points)
2013–	France	20	(0)
- Correct as of 17 June 2017

Eddy Ben Arous (born 25 August 1990) is a French rugby union player of Nigerian descent who plays prop for Top 14 side Racing 92.

== Early career ==
Ben Arous began his career with playing for his local side Rugby Trappes, before playing at semi-professional level with Dreux Rugby Club during the 2004-05 season. He was spotted by US Tours Rugby to play in the Fédérale 2 club championship division. He turned in strong performances, particularly at the set piece.

== Professional ==
In 2008, he was poached by Racing Métro, and in his first year, was selected for the France U18 team for the 2008 European Championship, where he helped the team to a third championship title. Despite joining Racing Métro in 2008, he didn't receive his first cap until 2010, after receiving a full contract, against Bourgoin - winning 51–20 at home. During that season, he made 9 appearances for the France U20 team across both the Six Nations Under 20s Championship and 2010 IRB Junior World Championship. He finished fourth during the Six Nations Under 20s Championship, while finishing fifth in the Junior World Championship - beating hosts Argentina twice.

During the 2011–12 Top 14 season, he became a more regular player with Racing Métro, making 23 appearances for his team in total. Racing Métro made it all the way to the quarter-final that season, but losing to Toulon 17–13. They again made it to the quarter-final in the 2012–13 Top 14 season, but lost to Toulouse 33–19. In the 2013–14 Top 14 season, they made it one step further. Having beaten Toulouse 16–21 in the quarter-final, they had to face European Champions Toulon in the semi-finals. Unfortunately for Racing Métro, they lost 16–6.

In November 2012, having played for France at U18, U19 and U20 level, Ben Arous was named in the France national squad for the 2012 autumn internationals by coach Philippe Saint-André. However, he did not play any part in the series. He was later named in the 35-man squad for the 2013 New Zealand Test Series, making his first Les Blues appearance against Super Rugby side Blues on 11 June 2013 - winning 38–15. He earned his first Test Cap in the final test on 22 June 2013, coming off the bench for Thomas Domingo on the 64th minute, in the 24–9 defeat.

== Honours ==
(France) Racing 92

- Top 14: 2015–16
