= Daniel Kötze =

France international rugby union player (born 1987)

Daniel Kotze
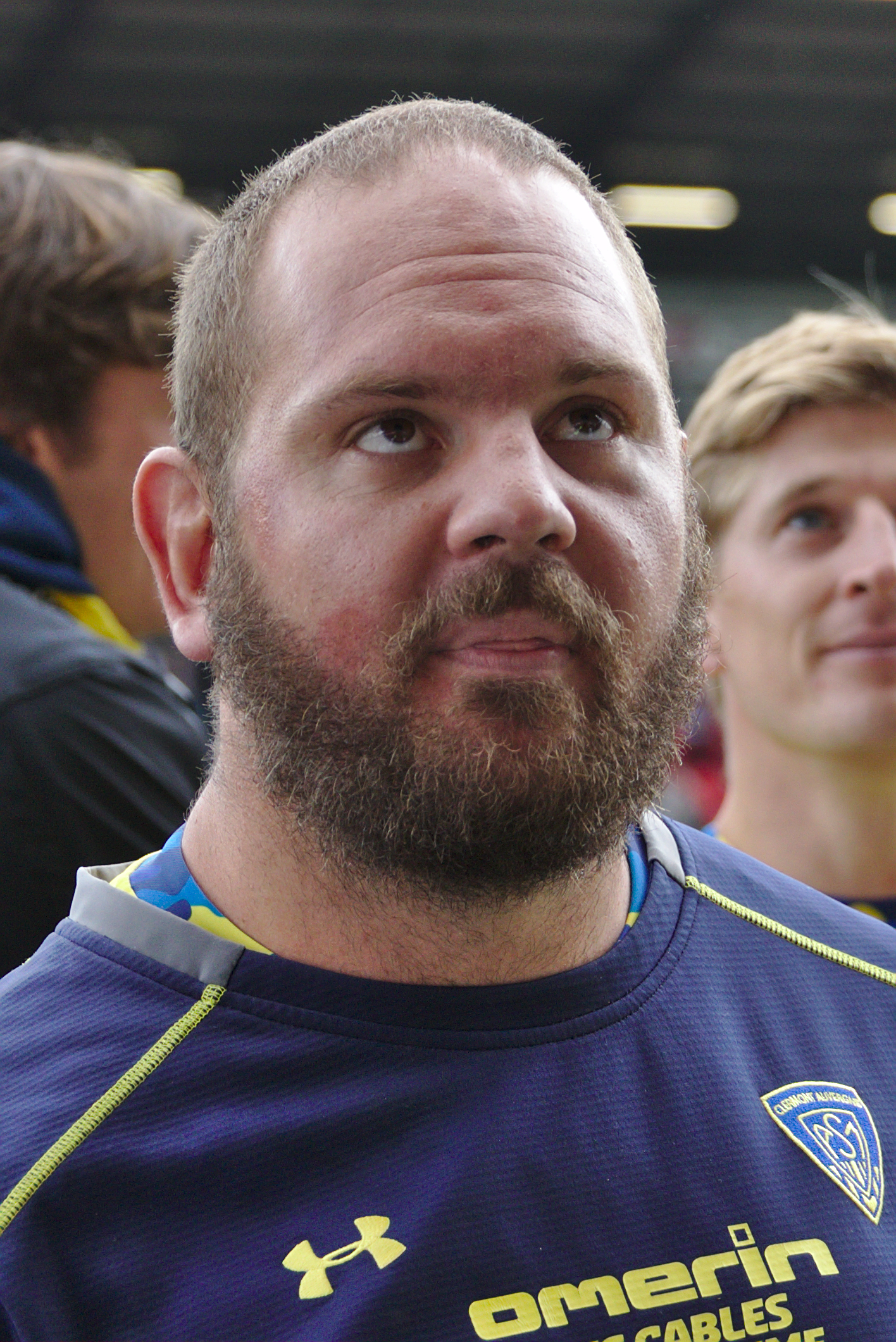
- Born: Daniel Kotze; 28 March 1987 (age 39) Frankfort, South Africa
- Height: 1.85 m (6 ft 1 in)
- Weight: 120 kg (18 st 13 lb)

Rugby union career
- Position: Prop
Senior career
Years	Team	Apps	(Points)
2009–2011	Aurillac	51	(0)
2011–2016	Clermont	105	(5)
2016–	Castres	46	(0)
- Correct as of 29 October 2017
Provincial / State sides
Years	Team	Apps	(Points)
2008–2009	Free State Cheetahs	6	(0)
International career
Years	Team	Apps	(Points)
2013–	France	4	(0)
- Correct as of 25 November 2017

Daniel Mattheus Kotze (born 28 March 1987) is a South African-born French rugby union player. His position is prop and he currently plays for Castres in the Top 14. He began his career in South Africa with the Free State Cheetahs before moving to Stade Aurillacois in 2009. He left Stade Aurillacois in 2011 to join ASM Clermont Auvergne. He was selected to play for France in 2013 against the All Blacks. He made his debut for France on 8 June 2013 against New Zealand, in Auckland replacing Luc Ducalcon.

== Honours ==
=== Club ===
(France) Castres

- Top 14: 2017–18
