= Alexandre Flanquart =

France international rugby union player (born 1989)

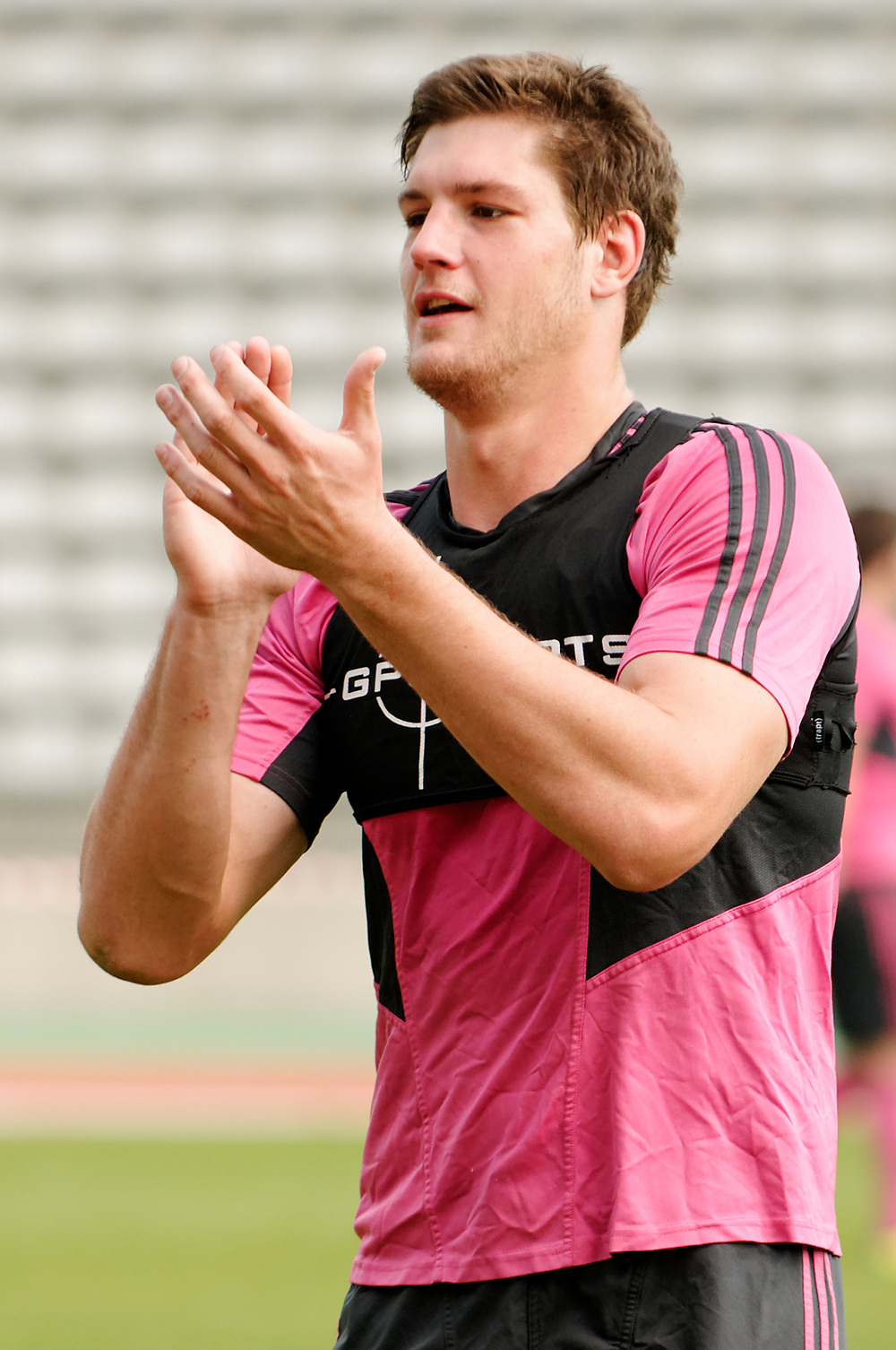
- Born: 9 October 1989 (age 37) Cambrai, France
- Height: 2.06 m (6 ft 8 ½ in)
- Weight: 120 kg (18 st 13 lb; 265 lb)

Rugby union career
- Position: Lock
Senior career
Years	Team	Apps	(Points)
2008–2019	Stade Français	163	(30)
2019–2021	Bordeaux Bègles	22	(0)
2021–2023	Provence	32	(0)
International career
Years	Team	Apps	(Points)
2013–2016	France	22	(0)

Alexandre Flanquart (born 9 October 1989) is a former French rugby union player. He played as a lock for Stade Français, Bordeaux Bègles, and Provence Rugby.

== Career ==
Alexandre Flanquart began playing professional rugby in 2009 for Stade Français, the club he remains playing for six years later. Even though he signed with Stade Français in 2008, he didn't receive his first appearance until 2009, where he came off the bench on the 74th minute against Bourgoin. On this occasions, Paris were victors 20–6. He became a more consistent player the following season, making 16 appearances overall. His form for his club saw him called up to the French national side for the 2013 France rugby union tour of New Zealand. He earned his first cap on the 8 June, coming off the bench for Yoann Maestri on the 70th minute. His has since then been a regular player in the French camp, being named in the squad for the 2014 and 2015 Six Nations Championship's, plus the 2014 end-of-year rugby union internationals squad.
