= Bernard Le Roux =

France international rugby union player

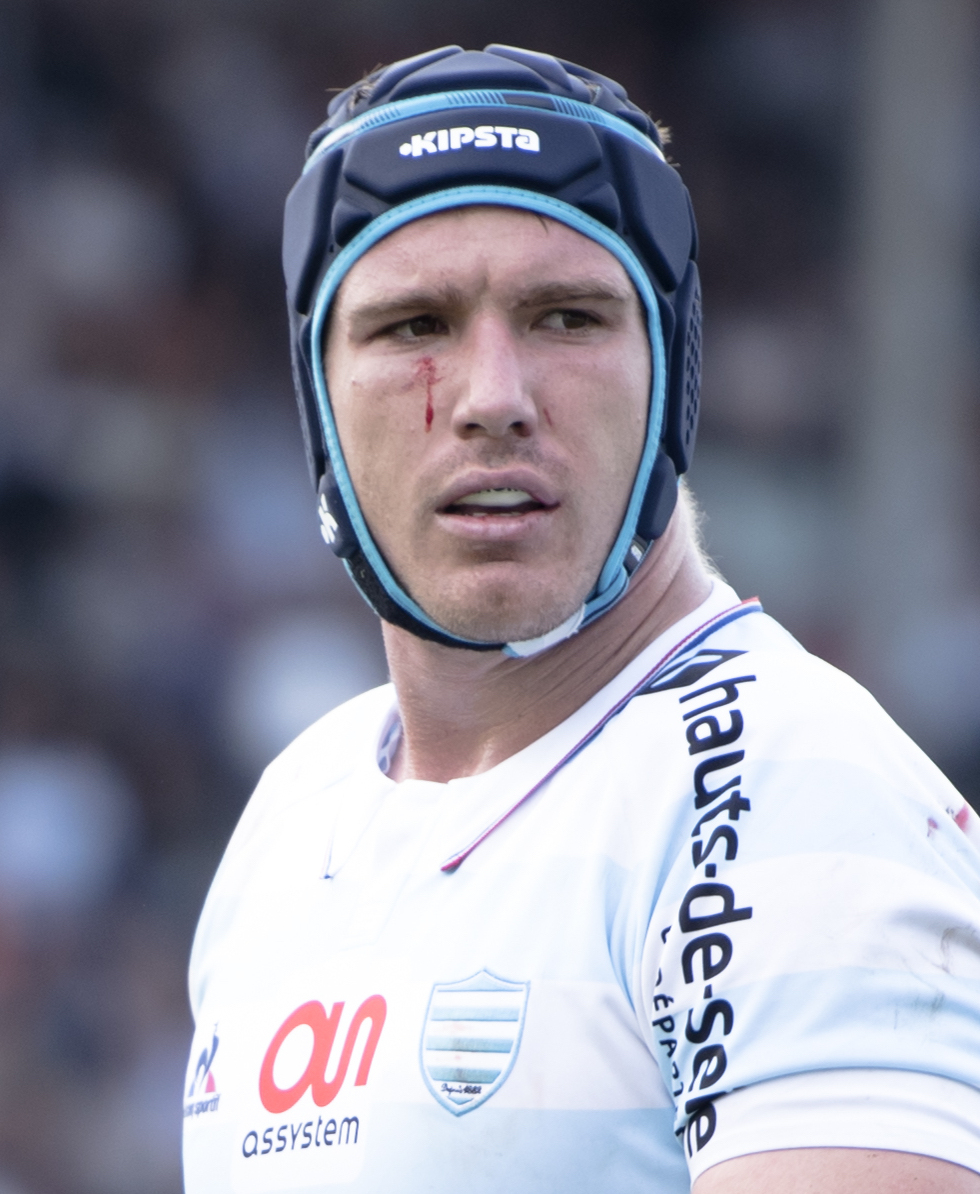
- Le Roux playing for Racing 92 in 2016
- Born: 4 June 1989 (age 37) Moorreesburg, Western Cape, South Africa
- Height: 1.95 m (6 ft 5 in)
- Weight: 113 kg (249 lb; 17 st 11 lb)

Rugby union career
- Position(s): Lock, Blindside Flanker
Amateur team(s)
Years	Team	Apps	(Points)
–2008	ASRV Ascrum		
Senior career
Years	Team	Apps	(Points)
2008–2009	Boland Cavaliers	4	(0)
2009	Border Bulldogs		
2009–2023	Racing 92	189	(55)
- Correct as of 21 March 2023
International career
Years	Team	Apps	(Points)
2013–2023	France	47	(0)
- Correct as of 21 March 2023

Bernard Le Roux ([bɛʁ.naʁ lə ʁu]; born 4 June 1989) is a South African-born French rugby union player, who recently played as flanker for French Top 14 side Racing 92.

On 11 July 2013, he stated to the French sport newspaper L'Equipe, "I've done some research, my family originated from the Nantes area. They first moved to Belgium and then to South Africa, a few centuries ago."

== Career ==
Bernard's rugby career started out when playing for amateur club side A.S.R.V. Ascrum in Amsterdam. In 2009, he represented the Boland Cavaliers in the 2009 Vodacom Cup, where the Cavaliers finished sixth in the Southern Section. He played in just 4 matches that season, all of them brief appearances from the bench. In addition to the Cavaliers, he spent some time with the Border Bulldogs during the 2009 Currie Cup First Division, in which the Bulldogs finished fifth in the Division.

Le Roux was tempted by Rugby World Cup winning coach Jake White to sign with the Lions for the 2010 Super 14 season. However, a call the night before he was due to sign the Lions contract convinced him that a short-term medical wildcard contract with Racing 92, then known as Racing Métro, would be better – with the aim of perhaps signing with the Lions after the stint was over. However, Le Roux explains that he "fell in love with the country, the culture and the rugby environment", and remained on with Racing Métro after his short-term contract.

He signed a three-year contract to start with, but a call up to the French senior squad for the 2013 French tour of New Zealand, being eligible through residency laws, was too tempting to decline, and a re-sign with Racing Métro was inevitable after the tour with 'Les Bleus'. He made his first appearance for France when playing against Super Rugby side the Auckland Blues on 11 June 2013. He started in what was a 38–15 victory. Le Roux made his test debut 4 days later in Christchurch, starting and playing the full 80 minutes in a 30–0 defeat to the All Blacks.

Since being named in that 38-man squad for the All Blacks tour, Le Roux has featured in every French squad Philippe Saint-André has announced, with Saint-André "looking to build something for the next World Cup" (the 2015 Rugby World Cup).

He represented France for the first time in the 2019 Rugby World Cup, starting in the game against the USA.

== Honours ==
(France) Racing 92

- Top 14: 2015–16
