= Valea Seacă, Bacău =

Valea Seacă
- Commune
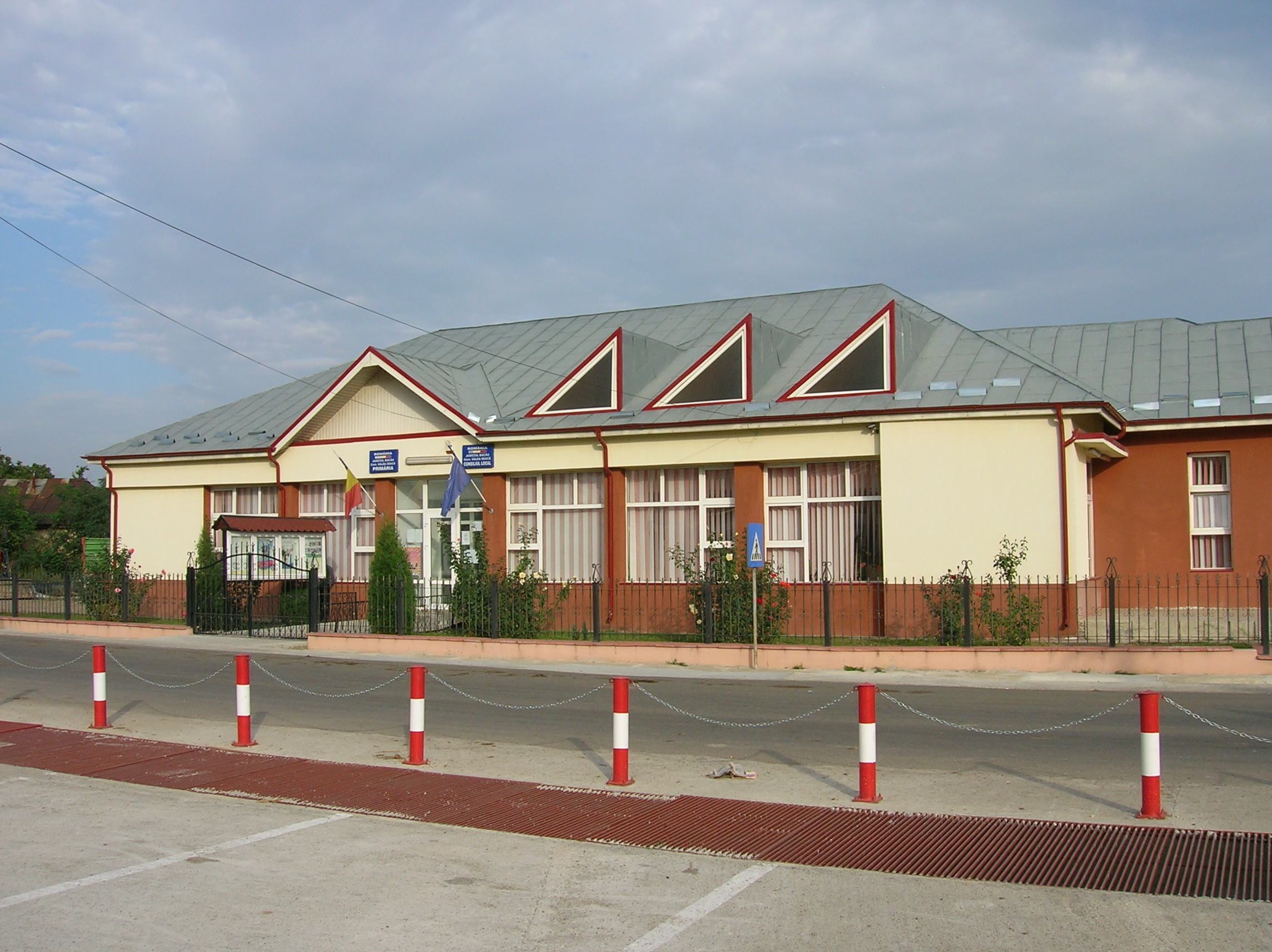
- Valea Seacă town hall

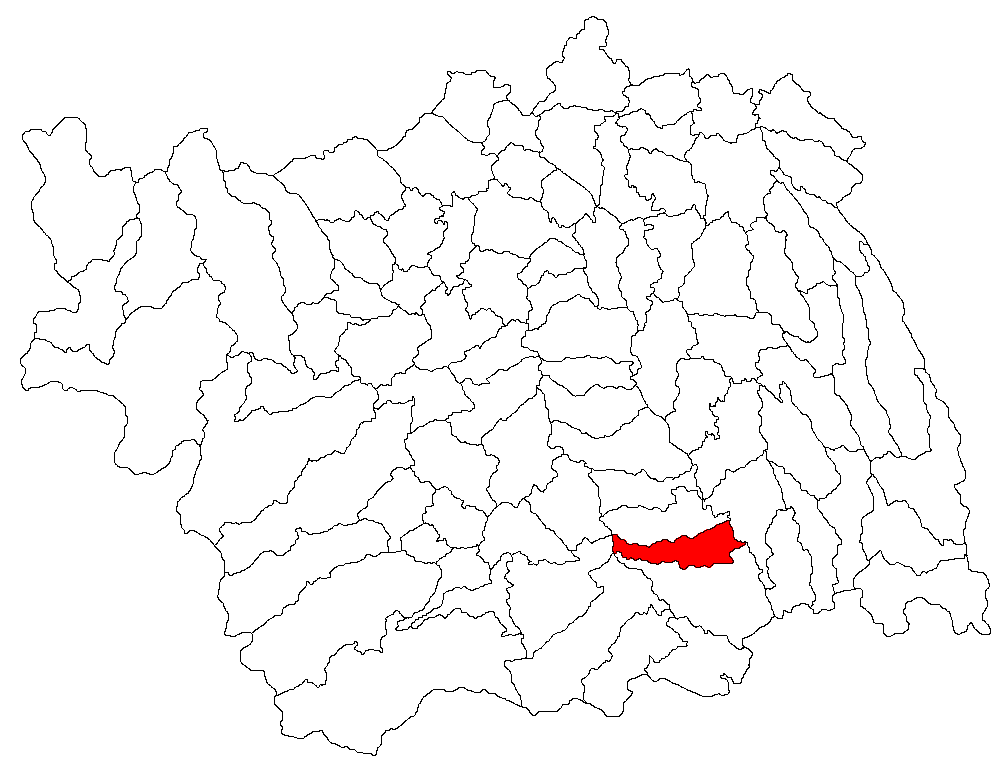
- Location in Bacău County

- Location in Romania
- Coordinates: 46°15′N 27°03′E
- Country: Romania
- County: Bacău

Government
  - Mayor (2020–2024): Ion Pravăț (PSD)
- Area: 47.95 km^{2} (18.51 sq mi)
- Elevation: 195 m (640 ft)
- Population (2021-12-01): 3,727
  - Density: 77.73/km^{2} (201.3/sq mi)
- Time zone: UTC+02:00 (EET)
  - Summer (DST): UTC+03:00 (EEST)
- Postal code: 607660
- Area code: +(40) 234
- Vehicle reg.: BC
- Website: primaria-valeaseaca.ro

Valea Seacă is a commune in Bacău County, Western Moldavia, Romania. It is composed of two villages, Cucova and Valea Seacă.

At the 2011 census, the commune had 3,867 inhabitants, of which 64.3% were Romanians and 35.6% Roma. At the 2021 census, Valea Seacă had a population of 3,727; of those, 50.17% were Romanians and 37.27% Roma.

== Natives ==
- Andrei Ursache (born 1984), rugby union player
