= Valentin Ursache =

Romanian rugby union player

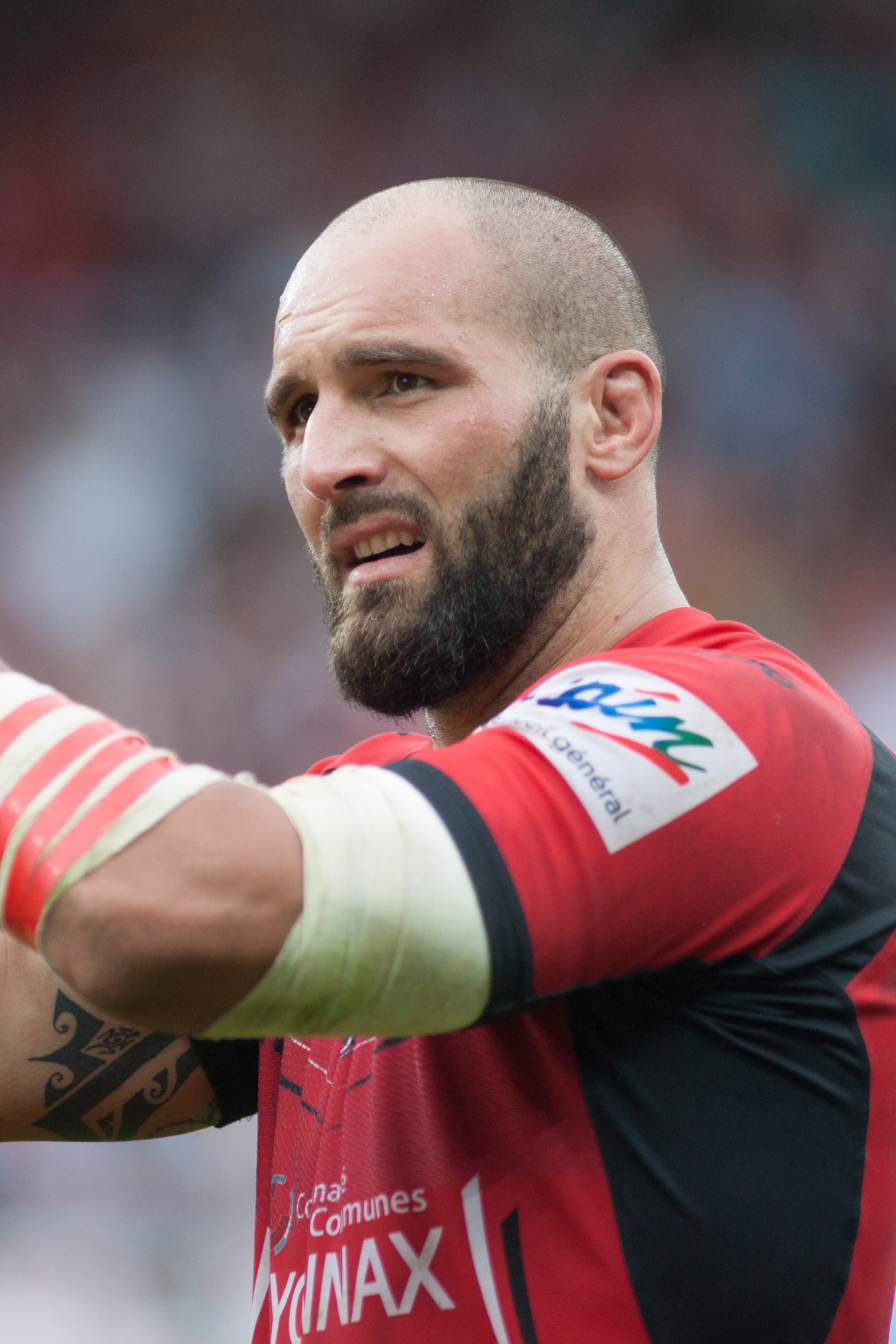
- Ursache captain of US Oyonnax in 2014
- Born: Valentin Niculae Ursache; 12 August 1985 (age 41) Târgu Neamț, Romania
- Height: 6 ft 4 in (1.93 m)
- Weight: 248 lb (112 kg; 17.7 st)
- Notable relative: Andrei Ursache (brother)

Rugby union career
- Position: Lock
Senior career
Years	Team	Apps	(Points)
2003–2007	Contor Zenner Arad		
2007–2008	Steaua București		
2008–2010	CSM Baia Mare		
2010–2012	Pays d'Aix	35	(25)
2012–2022	Oyonnax	211	(70)
- Correct as of 15 April 2021
International career
Years	Team	Apps	(Points)
2004–2018	Romania	66	(20)
- Correct as of 15 April 2021

Valentin Niculae Ursache (born 12 August 1985 in Târgu Neamț) is a Romanian former rugby union player.

Ursache played in Romania for Contor Zenner Arad, Steaua Bucharest and CSM Baia Mare. He also played in France for Pays d'Aix RC and Oyonnax, from where he retired in June 2022.

Ursache has 55 caps for Romania, since his debut at 26 June 2004, in the historical 25-24 win over Italy, in Bucharest, in a test match. He played twice at the 2007 Rugby World Cup, coming on both times as a substitute. He was called into the squad for the 2011 Rugby World Cup, playing in three matches. He also played in four group stage matches of Romania's 2015 Rugby World Cup campaign.

On 29 April 2013, Ursache was named honorary citizen of Oyonnax.

== Honours ==
=== Club ===
Steaua București

- Romanian Cup: 2007

CSM Baia Mare

- SuperLiga Champion: 2009, 2010

Oyonnax

- Pro D2 Champion: 2012–13, 2016–17
