= Andrei Ursache =

Romanian rugby union player

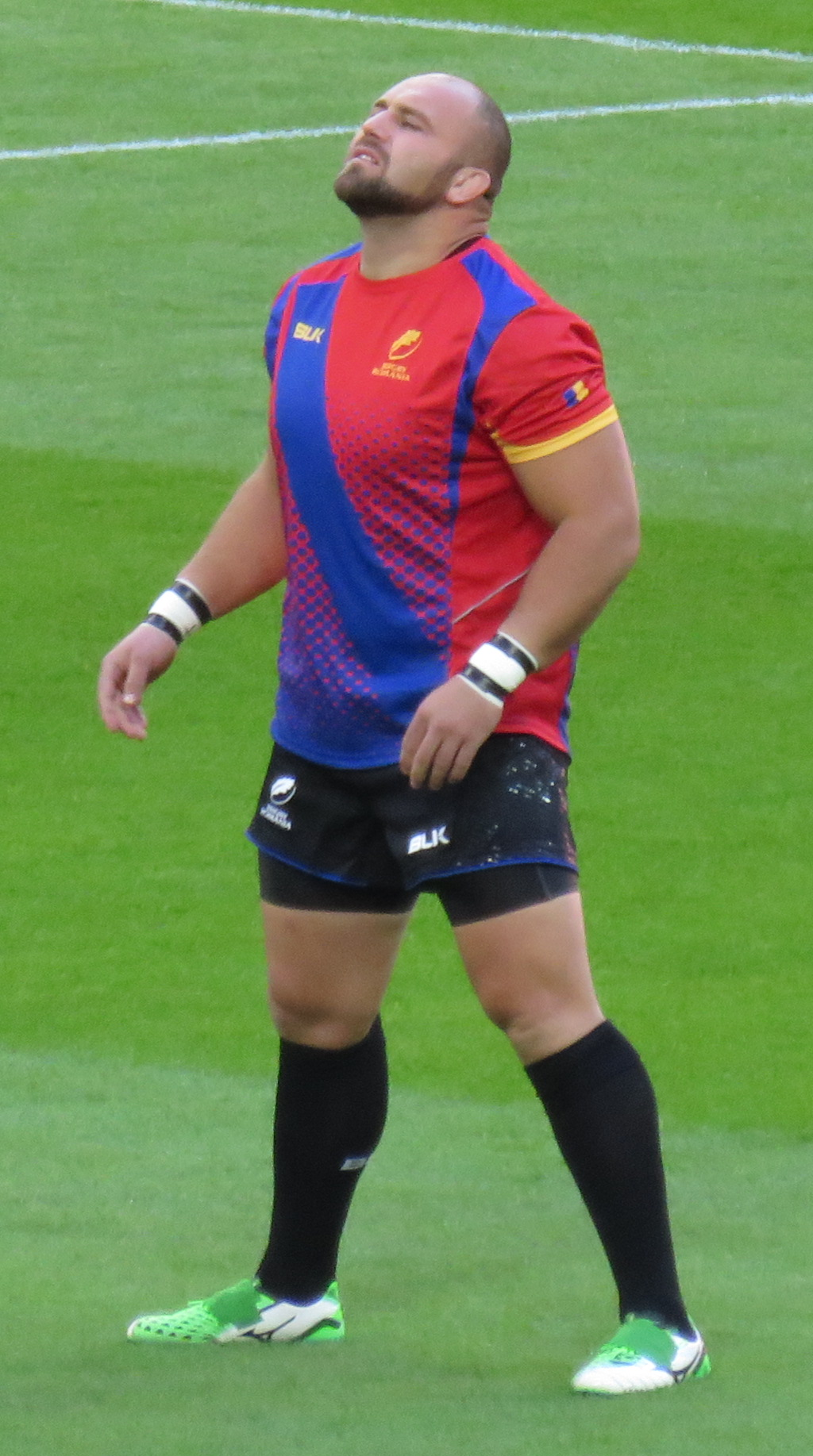
- Born: 10 May 1984 (age 42) Valea Seacă, Romania
- Height: 1.80 m (5 ft 11 in)
- Weight: 117 kg (18 st 6 lb; 258 lb)
- Notable relative: Valentin Ursache (brother)

Rugby union career
- Position: Prop
- Correct as of 20 September 2015
Senior career
Years	Team	Apps	(Points)
2011–12	București Wolves	6	(0)
2012–	Carcassonne	165	(60)
- Correct as of 26 December 2019 @ 18:08:27PM
International career
Years	Team	Apps	(Points)
2012–2019	Romania	34	(20)
2022–	Romania		
- Correct as of 22 November 2017

Andrei Ursache (born 10 May 1984) is a Romanian rugby union player. He plays in the prop position for amateur Pro D2 club Carcassonne and formally for București based European Challenge Cup side the Wolves. Ursache also plays for Romania's national team the Oaks.

He is the older brother of fellow rugby union player Valentin Ursache.
