= Thomas Domingo =

France international rugby union player

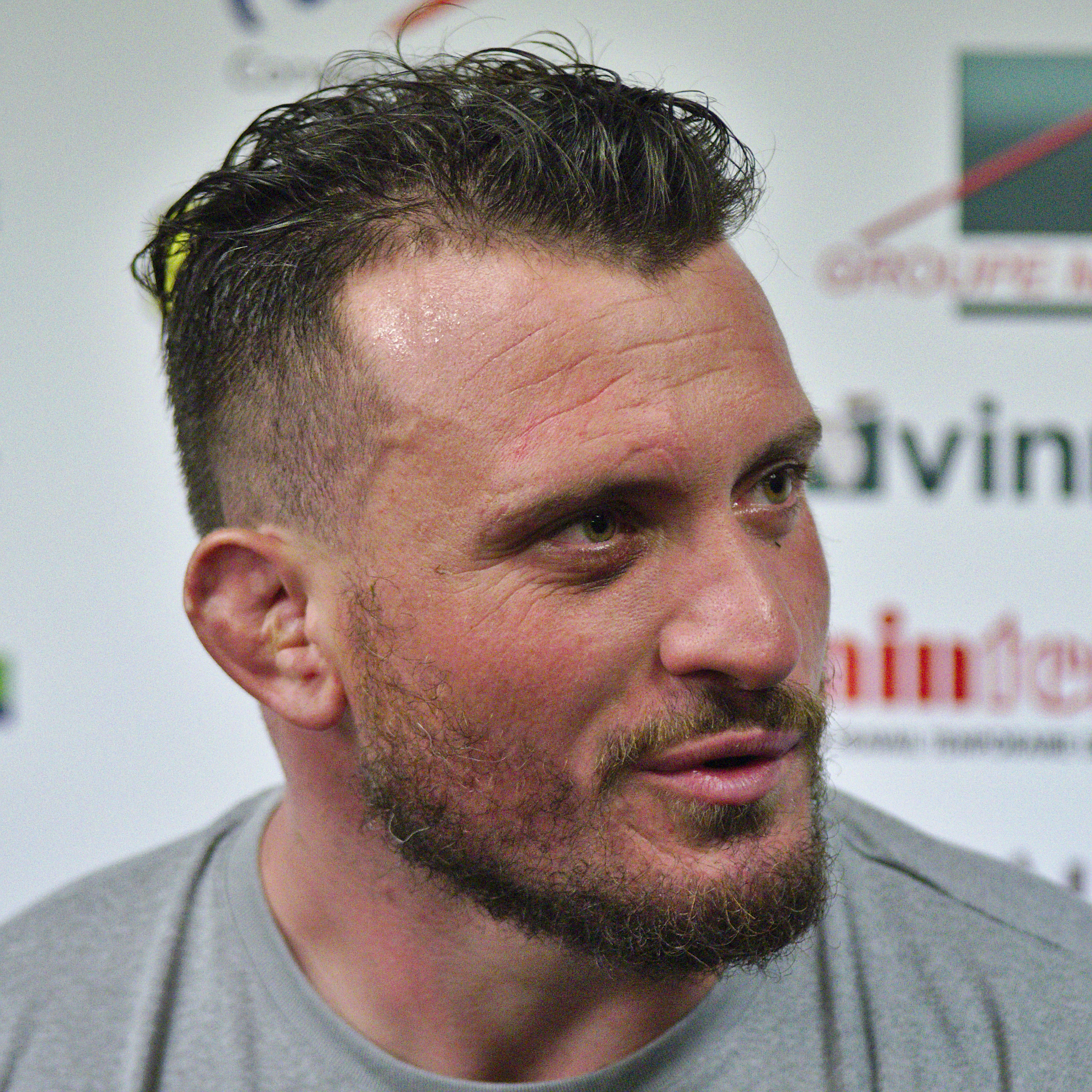
- Born: Thomas Domingo; 20 August 1985 (age 41) Tulle, France
- Height: 173 cm (5 ft 8 in)
- Weight: 108 kg (17 st 0 lb)

Rugby union career
- Position: Loosehead prop
- Current team: ASM Clermont Auvergne
Senior career
Years	Team	Apps	(Points)
2006–2017	Clermont	170	(60)
2017-	Pau	27	(0)
- Correct as of 31 January 2015
International career
Years	Team	Apps	(Points)
2009–2014	France	36	(5)
- Correct as of 21 June 2014

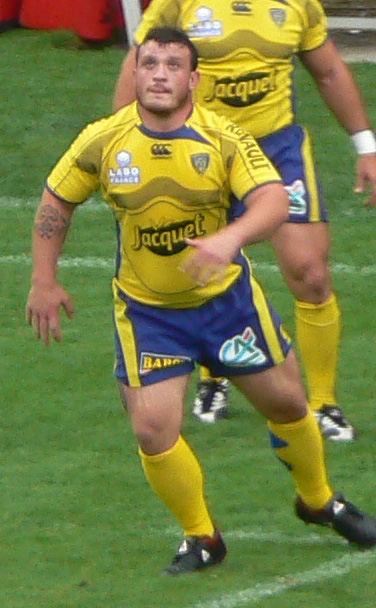
Domingo playing for Clermont Auvergne

Thomas Domingo (born 20 August 1985) is a French rugby union player. He is of Portuguese descent. Domingo, who is a loosehead prop, plays his club rugby for ASM Clermont Auvergne. He made his debut for France against Wales on 27 February 2009. He played in the final as Clermont won the Top 14 title in 2009–10.

Domingo's brother, Fabien Domingo, plays at number eight for CA Brive.

Domingo was named in France's provisional squad for the 2011 Rugby World Cup, but was ultimately left out of the final squad.

== International tries ==
#	Date	Venue	Opponent	Result (France-...)	Competition
1.	21 March 2009	Stade de France, Saint-Denis, France	Italy	50-8	Six Nations Championship
