= 2017–18 European Rugby Champions Cup pool stage =

- Season: 2017–18 European Rugby Champions Cup
- Date: 13 October 2017 – 21 January 2018

Qualifiers
- Seed 1: (Ireland) Leinster
- Seed 2: (France) Clermont
- Seed 3: (Ireland) Munster
- Seed 4: (Wales) Scarlets
- Seed 5: (France) La Rochelle
- Seed 6: (France) Toulon
- Seed 7: (France) Racing 92
- Seed 8: (England) Saracens

Locations of British and Irish teams of the 2017–18 European Rugby Champions Cup group stage.
Brown: Pool 1; Red: Pool 2; Orange: Pool 3; Yellow: Pool 4;
Green: Pool 5.
Locations of French and Italian teams of the 2017–18 European Rugby Champions Cup group stage.
Brown: Pool 1; Red: Pool 2; Orange: Pool 3; Yellow: Pool 4;
Green: Pool 5.

The 2017–18 European Rugby Champions Cup pool stage is the first stage of the 23rd season of European club rugby union, and the fourth under the European Rugby Champions Cup format.

The competition involves twenty teams, across five pools of four teams, for eight quarter-final places – awarded to the five pool winners and the three top-ranked pool runners-up.

The pool stage began on the weekend of 13–15 October 2017, and ended following round 6, on the weekend of 19–21 January 2018.

== Seeding ==
The 20 competing teams are seeded and split into four tiers, each containing five teams.

For the purpose of creating the tiers, clubs are ranked based on their domestic league performances and on their qualification for the knockout phases of their championships, so a losing quarter-finalist in the Top 14 would be seeded below a losing semi-finalist, even if they finished above them in the regular season.

Rank	Top 14	Premiership	Pro 12
1	(France) Clermont	(England) Exeter Chiefs	(Wales) Scarlets
2	(France) Toulon	(England) Wasps	(Ireland) Munster
3	(France) La Rochelle	(England) Saracens	(Ireland) Leinster
4	(France) Racing 92	(England) Leicester Tigers	(Wales) Ospreys
5	(France) Montpellier	(England) Bath Rugby	(Ireland) Ulster
6	(France) Castres	(England) Harlequins	(Scotland) Glasgow Warriors
7		(England) Northampton Saints	(Italy) Benetton

Based on these seedings, teams are placed into one of the four tiers, with the top seed clubs being put in Tier 1. The nature of the tier system means that a draw is needed to allocate two of the three second seed clubs to Tier 1. The tiers are shown below. Brackets show each team's seeding and their league (for example, 1 Top 14 indicates the team was seeded 1st from the Top 14).

Tier 1	(England) Exeter Chiefs (1 AP)	(Wales) Scarlets (1 Pro12)	(France) Clermont (1 Top 14)	(England) Wasps (2 AP)	(Ireland) Munster (2 Pro12)
Tier 2	(France) Toulon (2 Top 14)	(England) Saracens (3 AP)	(Ireland) Leinster (3 Pro12)	(France) La Rochelle (3 Top 14)	(France) Racing 92 (4 Top 14)
Tier 3	(England) Leicester Tigers (4 AP)	(Wales) Ospreys (4 Pro12)	(England) Bath Rugby (5 AP)	(Ireland) Ulster (5 Pro12)	(France) Montpellier (5 Top 14)
Tier 4	(England) Harlequins (6 AP)	(Scotland) Glasgow Warriors (6 Pro12)	(France) Castres (6 Top 14)	(Italy) Benetton (7 Pro12)	(England) Northampton Saints (Play-off)

The following restrictions will apply to the draw:

- Each pool will consist of four clubs, one from each tier in the draw.
- Each pool must have one from each league drawn from Tier 1, 2 or 3. No pool will have a second team from the same league until the allocation of Tier 4 takes place.
- Where two PRO12 clubs compete in the same pool, they must be from different countries.

== Pool stage ==
The draw took place on 8 June 2017, in Neuchâtel, Switzerland.

Teams in the same pool play each other twice, at home and away, in the group stage that begins on the weekend of 13/14/15 October 2017, and continues through to 19/20/21 January 2018. The five pool winners and three best runners-up progress to the quarter-finals.

Teams are awarded group points based on match performances. Four points are awarded for a win, two points for a draw, one attacking bonus point for scoring four or more tries in a match and one defensive bonus point for losing a match by seven points or fewer.

In the event of a tie between two or more teams, the following tie-breakers will be used, as directed by EPCR:

1. Where teams have played each other
  1. The club with the greater number of competition points from only matches involving tied teams.
  2. If equal, the club with the best aggregate points difference from those matches.
  3. If equal, the club that scored the most tries in those matches.
2. Where teams remain tied and/or have not played each other in the competition (i.e. are from different pools)
  1. The club with the best aggregate points difference from the pool stage.
  2. If equal, the club that scored the most tries in the pool stage.
  3. If equal, the club with the fewest players suspended in the pool stage.
  4. If equal, the drawing of lots will determine a club's ranking.

Key to colours
Winner of each pool, advance to quarter-finals.
Three highest-scoring second-place teams advance to quarter-finals.
Cannot advance to the quarter-finals.

(Q) denotes the team has qualified for the quarter-finals as the pool winners
(q) denotes team has at least qualified for the quarter-finals as one of the three highest-scoring second-place teams

=== Pool 1 ===
Team	P	W	D	L	PF	PA	Diff	TF	TA	TB	LB	Pts
(France) La Rochelle (5)	6	4	0	2	156	121	+35	18	17	3	1	20
(England) Wasps	6	3	0	3	154	121	+33	21	15	4	1	17
(Ireland) Ulster	6	4	0	2	132	118	+14	15	15	1	0	17
(England) Harlequins	6	1	0	5	106	188	–82	15	22	2	1	7

13 October 2017
19:45

Ulster (Ireland)	19–9	(England) Wasps
Try: Stockdale 54' m McCloskey 56' m Pen: Cooney (1/2) 14'; Lealiifano (2/2) 69', 74'	Report	Pen: Daly (1/1) 3'; Gopperth (2/2) 40', 46'

Kingspan Stadium
Attendance: 15,291
Referee: Ben Whitehouse (WRU)

14 October 2017
17:30

(1 BP) Harlequins (England)	27–34	(France) La Rochelle (1 BP)
Try: Matthews 14' c Marchant 32' c Collier 61' c Con: Smith (3/3) 15', 33', 62'; Pen: Smith (2/2) 9', 79'	Report	Try: Forbes 2' c Doumayrou (2) 24' c, 44' c Priso 30' c Con: Lamb (4/4) 3', 25', 31', 45'; Pen: Lamb (2/3) 12', 52'

Twickenham Stoop
Attendance: 11,705
Referee: Marius Mitrea (FIR)

22 October 2017
16:15

(1 BP) La Rochelle (France)	41–17	(Ireland) Ulster
Try: Sinzelle 2' c Vito 50' c Gourdon 59' c Aguillon 62' c Eaton 65' c Con: Lamb (1/1) 3'; Balès (2/2) 51', 60'; Goillot (2/2) 64', 66'; Pen: Balès (2/2) 22', 27'	Report	Try: Lealiifano 9' c Bowe 69' c Con: Lealiifano (1/1) 10'; Pen: Lealiifano (1/1) 15'

Stade Marcel-Deflandre
Attendance: 16,000
Referee: Nigel Owens (WRU)

22 October 2017
17:30

(1 BP) Wasps (England)	41–10	(England) Harlequins
Try: Robson 3' c Wade (2) 6' c, 71' c Johnson 32' c Bassett 66' c Con: Gopperth (4/4) 4', 8', 33', 68'; Miller (1/1) 72'; Pen: Gopperth (2/2) 54', 64'	Report	Try: Saili 59' c Con: Smith (1/1) 60'; Pen: Smith (1/1) 11'

Ricoh Arena
Attendance: 12,806
Referee: Mathieu Raynal (FFR)

10 December 2017
13:00

Harlequins (England)	5–17	(Ireland) Ulster
Try: Sinckler 49' m	Report	Try: Stockdale 25' m Pen: Cooney (4/5) 5', 61', 65', 78'

Twickenham Stoop
Attendance: 8,327
Referee: Pascal Gaüzère (FFR)

10 December 2017
14:00

(1 BP) La Rochelle (France)	49–29	(England) Wasps (1 BP)
Try: Aguillon 11' c Bourgarit 16' c Veivuke (2) 25' c, 77' c Rattez (2) 46' m, 63' c Con: James (3/4) 12', 17', 26'; Lamb (2/2) 64', 78'; Pen: James (3/3) 7', 34', 40'	Report	Try: Miller 10' m Young 21' c Daly 60' m Simpson 69' c Stuart 74' m Con: Gopperth (2/5) 22', 69'

Stade Marcel-Deflandre
Attendance: 16,000
Referee: John Lacey (IRFU)

15 December 2017
19:45

(1 BP) Ulster (Ireland)	52–24	(England) Harlequins (1 BP)
Try: McCloskey 17' c Gilroy 43' c Piutau 55' m O'Connor 61' c Cooney 71' c Trimble 79' c Con: Cooney (5/6) 18', 45', 62', 72', 80'; Pen: Cooney (4/4) 4', 9', 33', 50'	Report	Try: Smith 13' m Walker 29' c Chisholm 58' m Ward 66' c Con: Smith (2/4) 30', 67'

Kingspan Stadium
Attendance: 15,646
Referee: Alexandre Ruiz (FFR)

17 December 2017
13:00

Wasps (England)	21–3	(France) La Rochelle
Try: Daly (2) 10' c, 46' c Cruse 72' c Con: Daly (2/2) 11', 46'; Cipriani (1/1) 73'	Report	Pen: James (1/1) 59'

Ricoh Arena
Attendance: 12,931
Referee: George Clancy (IRFU)

13 January 2018
13:00

Ulster (Ireland)	20–13	(France) La Rochelle (1 BP)
Try: Best 27' m Stockdale 34' m Timoney 44' c Con: Cooney (1/3) 45'; Pen: Cooney (1/1) 49'	Report	Try: Balès 42' c Con: Balès (1/1) 43'; Pen: Balès (2/2) 8', 15'

Kingspan Stadium
Attendance: 15,004
Referee: Wayne Barnes (RFU)

13 January 2018
17:30

(1 BP) Harlequins (England)	33–28	(England) Wasps (2 BP)
Try: R. Chisholm 34' m Lang 40' c Care 64' c Elia 69' c J. Chisholm 79' c Con: Lang (1/2) 40'; Smith (3/3) 65', 70', 80'	Report	Try: Eastmond 16' c Carr 19' c Johnson 30' c Macken 54' c Con: Cipriani (4/4) 17', 20', 31', 56'

Twickenham Stoop
Attendance: 10,354
Referee: Romain Poite (FFR)

21 January 2018
16:15

La Rochelle (France)	16–7	(England) Harlequins
Try: Aguillon 19' m Murimurivalu 37' m Pen: Balès (2/2) 4', 50'		Try: Care 46' c Con: Smith (1/1) 47'

Stade Marcel-Deflandre
Attendance: 16,000
Referee: George Clancy (IRFU)

21 January 2018
15:15

(1 BP) Wasps (England)	26–7	(Ireland) Ulster
Try: Thompson 10' c Cruse 31' c Le Roux 46' m Cooper-Woolley 55' c Con: Cipriani (3/4) 11', 32', 56'		Try: Reidy 23' c Con: Cooney (1/1) 24'

Ricoh Arena
Attendance: 13,124
Referee: Jérôme Garcès (FFR)

=== Pool 2 ===
Team	P	W	D	L	PF	PA	Diff	TF	TA	TB	LB	Pts
(France) Clermont (2)	6	5	0	1	165	104	+61	16	14	2	0	22
(England) Saracens (8)	6	3	1	2	205	146	+59	24	13	3	1	18
(Wales) Ospreys	6	2	1	3	152	148	+4	18	16	3	2	15
(England) Northampton Saints	6	1	0	5	115	239	–124	16	31	2	0	6

15 October 2017
17:30

Northampton Saints (England)	13–57	(England) Saracens (1 BP)
Try: Haywood 75' c Con: Mallinder (1/1) 76'; Pen: Myler (2/2) 8', 33'	Report	Try: L. Williams (2) 11' c, 28' m Barritt 20' c Clark 39' c Koch 41' c M. Vunipola 64' c Lozowski 67' c Spencer 77' c Con: Farrell (7/8) 12', 21', 40', 42', 65', 67', 77'; Pen: Farrell (1/2) 16'

Franklin's Gardens
Attendance: 13,320
Referee: Pascal Gaüzère (FFR)

15 October 2017
17:30

(1 BP) Ospreys (Wales)	21–26	(France) Clermont
Try: Webb 18' c D. Evans (2) 60' c, 74' c Con: Biggar (3/3) 19', 61', 74'	Report	Try: Raka 5' c Spedding 10' c Con: Parra (2/2) 7', 11'; Pen: Parra (3/3) 23', 28', 52'; Spedding (1/1) 79'

Liberty Stadium
Attendance: 7,458
Referee: Andrew Brace (IRFU)

21 October 2017
16:15

(1 BP) Clermont (France)	24–7	(England) Northampton Saints
Try: Lee 6' c Cassang (2) 38' c, 41' m Fofana 59' m Con: Parra (2/4) 7', 39'	Report	Try: Day 47' c Con: Mallinder (1/1) 48'

Stade Marcel-Michelin
Attendance: 18,444
Referee: Ben Whitehouse (WRU)

21 October 2017
19:45

(1 BP) Saracens (England)	36–34	(Wales) Ospreys (2 BP)
Try: Wyles 7' c Brits 40' c Penalty try 54'; Williams 60' m Tompkins 72' c Con: Farrell (3/4) 8', 40', 73'; Pen: Farrell (1/1) 33'	Report	Try: D. Evans (2) 10' c, 18' c Watkin 68' c Cross 77' c Con: Biggar (4/4) 11', 19', 68', 78'; Pen: Biggar (2/2) 25', 44'

Allianz Park
Attendance: 9,045
Referee: Marius Mitrea (FIR)

9 December 2017
17:30

(1 BP) Northampton Saints (England)	32–43	(Wales) Ospreys (1 BP)
Try: Hartley 52' m Groom 63' m Horne 66' m Tuala 68' c Mallinder 71' m Con: Mallinder (2/4) 66', 68'; Pen: Myler (1/1) 16'	Report	Try: D. Evans (2) 28' c, 55' c Habberfield 37' c Hassler (2) 45' c, 59' m Fonotia 48' c Con: Davies (5/6) 28', 38', 46', 49', 56'; Pen: Davies (1/1) 20'

Franklin's Gardens
Attendance: 8,105
Referee: Alexandre Ruiz (FFR)

11 December 2017 (Note: Game was originally to be held on 10 December 2017 but due to safety concerns caused by bad weather (snow) the date was changed to Monday afternoon.)
17:30

Saracens (England)	14–46	(France) Clermont (1 BP)
Try: Penalty try 27'; Kruis 73' c Con: Farrell (1/1) 73'	Report	Try: Raka (3) 12' c, 20' c, 24' c Van der Merwe 45' c Fofana 59' c Toeava 76' m Con: Parra (5/5) 13', 21', 25', 47', 60'; Pen: Parra (2/2) 31', 63'

Allianz Park
Attendance: 2,811
Referee: Nigel Owens (WRU)

17 December 2017
16:15

Clermont (France)	24–21	(England) Saracens (1 BP)
Pen: Parra (6/7) 18', 22', 33', 48', 54', 72'; Spedding (2/2) 40', 78'	Report	Try: Spencer 10' c Lozowski 63' m Con: Farrell (1/2) 11'; Pen: Farrell (3/3) 4', 7', 60'

Stade Marcel-Michelin
Attendance: 18,808
Referee: Andrew Brace (IRFU)

17 December 2017
15:15

(1 BP) Ospreys (Wales)	32–15	(England) Northampton Saints
Try: Arhip 1' m Webb (2) 55' c, 68' c Tipuric 65' c Con: Davies (3/4) 56', 66', 69'; Pen: Davies (2/2) 24', 30'	Report	Try: Mallinder 45' m Gibson 80' c Con: Mallinder (1/1) 80'; Pen: Francis (1/1) 49'

Liberty Stadium
Attendance: 6,947
Referee: Marius Mitrea (FIR)

13 January 2018
17:30

(1 BP) Northampton Saints (England)	34–21	(France) Clermont
Try: Harrison 12' m Tuitavake 30' m Foden 43' c Pisi 63' c Reinach 72' c Con: Mallinder (3/5) 45', 64', 74'; Pen: Mallinder (1/2) 42'	Report	Try: Grosso 1' c Toeava 15' m Con: Parra (1/2) 2'; Pen: Parra (3/5) 30', 48', 57'

Franklin's Gardens
Attendance: 8,253
Referee: George Clancy (IRFU)

13 January 2018
19:45

Ospreys (Wales)	15–15	(England) Saracens
Pen: Biggar (5/5) 30', 40', 44', 71', 79'	Report	Pen: Farrell (5/5) 5', 19', 33', 47', 75'

Liberty Stadium
Attendance: 9,158
Referee: John Lacey (IRFU)

20 January 2018
16:15

Clermont (France)	24–7	(Wales) Ospreys
Try: Abendanon 24' c McAlister 77' m Con: Parra (1/1) 25'; Pen: Parra (3/3) 30', 37', 69'; Laidlaw (1/1) 75'	Report	Try: Beck 58' c Con: Dan Biggar (1/1) 59'

Stade Marcel-Michelin
Attendance: 18,007
Referee: JP Doyle (RFU)

20 January 2018
15:15

(1 BP) Saracens (England)	62–14	(England) Northampton Saints
Try: M. Vunipola 14' c Goode 20' c Bosch 28' m Wigglesworth 34' c Koch 40' c Maitland 53' c Vailanu 62' c Con: Farrell (6/7) 14', 21', 36', 40', 54', 63'; Pen: Farrell (5/5) 9', 46', 49', 68', 73'	Report	Try: Reinach 5' c Tuitavake 16' c Con: Mallinder (2/2) 6', 17'

Allianz Park
Attendance: 10,000
Referee: Mathieu Raynal (FFR)

=== Pool 3 ===
Team	P	W	D	L	PF	PA	Diff	TF	TA	TB	LB	Pts
(Ireland) Leinster (1)	6	6	0	0	176	93	+83	22	12	3	0	27
(England) Exeter Chiefs	6	3	0	3	138	117	+21	18	14	1	2	15
(France) Montpellier	6	2	0	4	130	163	–33	18	23	3	2	13
(Scotland) Glasgow Warriors	6	1	0	5	128	199	–71	18	27	2	1	7

14 October 2017
13:00

(1 BP) Leinster (Ireland)	24–17	(France) Montpellier (1 BP)
Try: Carbery 17' m Van der Flier 25' c Henshaw 43' c B. Daly 66' m Con: R. Byrne (1/3) 44'; Nacewa (1/1) 26'	Report	Try: Nadolo (2) 37' c, 61' c Con: Pienaar (2/2) 38', 63'; Pen: Pienaar (1/2) 70'

RDS Arena
Attendance: 15,995
Referee: Wayne Barnes (RFU)

14 October 2017
19:45

Exeter Chiefs (England)	24–15	(Scotland) Glasgow Warriors
Try: Williams 17' c J. Hill 26' c S. Simmonds 77' c Con: Steenson (3/3) 17', 26', 78'; Pen: Steenson (1/2) 42'	Report	Try: Seymour 9' c L. Jones 43' m Con: Russell (1/2) 11'; Pen: Russell (1/1) 6'

Sandy Park
Attendance: 10,672
Referee: Alexandre Ruiz (FFR)

21 October 2017
13:00

Glasgow Warriors (Scotland)	18–34	(Ireland) Leinster (1 BP)
Try: Hogg 15' c Seymour 48' m Con: Russell (1/2) 16'; Pen: Russell (2/2) 14', 63'	Report	Try: Healy (2) 23' c, 40' c Sexton 44' c Reid 75' c Con: Sexton (3/3) 25', 40', 45'; R. Byrne (1/1) 75'; Pen: Sexton (2/2) 2', 67'

Scotstoun Stadium
Attendance: 7,351
Referee: Jérôme Garcès (FFR)

22 October 2017
14:00

(2 BP) Montpellier (France)	24–27	(England) Exeter Chiefs
Try: Tomane 6' m Paillaugue 24' m Nadolo (2) 39' c, 45' c Con: Paillaugue (2/4) 40', 46'	Report	Try: Armand (2) 17' c, 63' c Whitten 42' c Con: Steenson (3/3) 18', 43', 64'; Pen: Steenson (2/2) 20', 71'

Altrad Stadium
Attendance: 9,541
Referee: John Lacey (IRFU)

8 December 2017
19:45

(1 BP) Glasgow Warriors (Scotland)	22–29	(France) Montpellier (1 BP)
Try: Sarto (2) 12' c, 57' m Turner 22' c Con: Russell (2/3) 13', 24'; Pen: Russell (1/1) 3'	Report	Try: Galletier (2) 9' m, 32' c Penalty try 37'; WHJ. du Plessis 47' c Con: Steyn (2/3) 33', 48'; Pen: Steyn (1/1) 70'

Scotstoun Stadium
Attendance: 7,351
Referee: Matthew Carley (RFU)

10 December 2017
17:30

Exeter Chiefs (England)	8–18	(Ireland) Leinster
Try: Short 53' m Pen: Steenson (1/1) 24'	Report	Try: Sexton 20' m Conan 70' c Con: Nacewa (1/1) 71'; Pen: Sexton (1/2) 20'; Nacewa (1/1) 61'

Sandy Park
Attendance: 12,606
Referee: Romain Poite (FFR)

16 December 2017
14:00

(1 BP) Montpellier (France)	36–26	(Scotland) Glasgow Warriors (1 BP)
Try: Nadolo 6' c Ruffenach 15' c Immelman (2) 44' c, 66' c Paillaugue 47' m Con: Paillaugue (4/5) 6', 16', 45', 67'; Pen: Steyn (1/1) 77'	Report	Try: Brown 1' c P. Horne 12' c Grigg 18' m G. Horne 69' c Con: P. Horne (3/4) 2', 13', 70'

Altrad Stadium
Attendance: 11,000
Referee: JP Doyle (RFU)

16 December 2017
15:15

Leinster (Ireland)	22–17	(England) Exeter Chiefs (1 BP)
Try: L. McGrath 65' c Con: Nacewa (1/1) 66'; Pen: Nacewa (5/5) 11', 38', 40', 55', 63'	Report	Try: Skinner 2' c Cowan-Dickie 30' c Con: Steenson (2/2) 2', 31'; Pen: Steenson (1/1) 28'

Aviva Stadium
Attendance: 40,064
Referee: Pascal Gaüzère (FFR)

13 January 2018
15:15

(1 BP) Exeter Chiefs (England)	41–10	(France) Montpellier
Try: Ewers 27' c S. Simmonds 54' c Woodburn (2) 57' m, 63' c White 68' m Armand 73' c Con: Steenson (3/5) 28', 54', 64'; J. Simmonds (1/1) 74'; Pen: J. Simmonds (1/1) 80'	Report	Try: Nadolo 77' c Con: Cruden (1/1) 78'; Pen: Cruden (1/1) 52'

Sandy Park
Attendance: 11,427
Referee: Nigel Owens (WRU)

14 January 2018
13:00

(1 BP) Leinster (Ireland)	55–19	(Scotland) Glasgow Warriors
Try: Murphy 7' c Nacewa (2) 20' c, 56' c Cronin 31' c Fardy (2) 34' m, 77' c Sexton 38' m Lowe 67' c Con: Sexton (3/4) 8', 20', 32'; R. Byrne (3/3) 57', 68', 78'; Pen: Sexton (1/1) 23'	Report	Try: Matawalu (2) 16' c, 70' c Ashe 61' m Con: P. Horne (1/2) 17'; Thomson (1/1) 71'

RDS Arena
Attendance: 15,947
Referee: Marius Mitrea (FIR)

20 January 2018
13:00

(1 BP) Glasgow Warriors (Scotland)	28–21	(England) Exeter Chiefs (1 BP)
Try: Hogg 1' c Penalty try 52'; Seymour 59' c Fagerson 61' c Con: Russell (3/3) 1', 60', 62'	Report	Try: S. Simmonds 38' c Armand 65' c Whitten 68' c Con: Steenson (3/3) 39', 65', 69'

Scotstoun Stadium
Attendance: 7,351
Referee: Romain Poite (FFR)

20 January 2018
14:00

Montpellier (France)	14–23	(Ireland) Leinster
Try: B. Du Plessis 23' c Camara 36' c Con: Cruden (2/2) 24', 37'	Report	Try: R. Byrne 4' m Henshaw 45' m Cronin 51' c Con: R. Byrne (1/3) 53'; Pen: R. Byrne (2/2) 19', 49'

Altrad Stadium
Attendance: 8,250
Referee: Luke Pearce (RFU)

=== Pool 4 ===
Team	P	W	D	L	PF	PA	Diff	TF	TA	TB	LB	Pts
(Ireland) Munster (3)	6	4	1	1	167	87	+80	18	8	2	1	21
(France) Racing 92 (7)	6	4	0	2	128	105	+23	14	10	1	2	19
(France) Castres	6	2	1	3	111	161	–50	13	20	2	0	12
(England) Leicester Tigers	6	1	0	5	118	171	–53	12	19	1	2	7

14 October 2017
16:15

Racing 92 (France)	22–18	(England) Leicester Tigers (1 BP)
Try: Nakarawa 17' c Le Roux 23' c Thomas 28' m Con: Iribaren (2/3) 18', 24'; Pen: Machenaud (1/1) 57'	Report	Try: Hamilton 2' c May 34' m Con: G. Ford (1/2) 3'; Pen: G. Ford (2/2) 21', 76'

Stade Yves-du-Manoir
Attendance: 9,333
Referee: John Lacey (IRFU)

15 October 2017
14:00

Castres (France)	17–17	(Ireland) Munster
Try: Ebersohn 12' c Dumora 32' c Con: Urdapilleta (2/2) 13', 33'; Pen: Urdapilleta (1/3) 50'	Report	Try: Zebo 29' c Kilcoyne 46' c Con: Bleyendaal (2/2) 30', 47'; Pen: Bleyendaal (1/1) 38'

Stade Pierre-Fabre
Attendance: 9,577
Referee: Matthew Carley (RFU)

21 October 2017
17:30

(1 BP) Leicester Tigers (England)	54–29	(France) Castres (1 BP)
Try: May (2) 15' c, 42' c B. Youngs 25' c Veainu (3) 28' m, 34' c, 46' m Malouf 55' c Con: G. Ford (4/5) 17', 26', 35', 43'; J. Ford (1/2) 56'; Pen: G. Ford (3/3) 1', 9', 14'	Report	Try: Tulou 51' c Smith (3) 65' c, 71' c, 76' m Con: Kockott (3/4) 52', 66', 73'; Pen: Kockott (1/1) 6'

Welford Road
Attendance: 18,304
Referee: George Clancy (IRFU)

21 October 2017
17:30

Munster (Ireland)	14–7	(France) Racing 92 (1 BP)
Try: Murray 60' c Conway 69' c Con: Keatley (2/2) 61', 70'	Report	Try: Nakarawa 75' c Con: Iribaren (1/1) 76'

Thomond Park
Attendance: 22,054
Referee: JP Doyle (RFU)

9 December 2017
18:30

Castres (France)	16–13	(France) Racing 92 (1 BP)
Try: Vaipulu 73' c Con: Urdapilleta (1/1) 73'; Pen: Urdapilleta (3/3) 20', 32', 76'	Report	Try: Maka 50' c Con: Machenaud (1/1) 51'; Pen: Machenaud (2/2) 10', 35'

Stade Pierre-Fabre
Attendance: 8,538
Referee: Luke Pearce (RFU)

9 December 2017
19:45

(1 BP) Munster (Ireland)	33–10	(England) Leicester Tigers
Try: Marshall 19' c Zebo 30' c O'Mahony 55' m Cloete 67' m Con: Keatley (2/4) 20', 31'; Pen: Keatley (3/3) 7', 26', 37'	Report	Try: Thacker 64' c Con: G. Ford (1/1) 65'; Pen: G. Ford (1/1) 35'

Thomond Park
Attendance: 25,355
Referee: Jérôme Garcès (FFR)

16 December 2017
16:15

(1 BP) Racing 92 (France)	29–7	(France) Castres
Try: Nakarawa 4' c Vakatawa 14' c Dupichot (2) 59' m, 67' c Con: Machenaud (2/2) 5', 16'; Iribaren (1/2) 69'; Pen: Machenaud (1/1) 24'	Report	Try: Kockott 30' c Con: Kockott (1/1) 31'

Stade Yves-du-Manoir
Attendance: 9,067
Referee: Wayne Barnes (RFU)

17 December 2017
17:30

Leicester Tigers (England)	16–25	(Ireland) Munster
Try: Tait 12' c Con: G. Ford (1/1) 14'; Pen: G. Ford (3/3) 2', 51', 60'	Report	Try: Stander 42' c Con: Keatley (1/1) 43'; Pen: Keatley (6/7) 10', 23', 33', 39', 72', 77'

Welford Road
Attendance: 23,100
Referee: Mathieu Raynal (FFR)

14 January 2018
16:15

Racing 92 (France)	34–30	(Ireland) Munster (1 BP)
Try: Nyanga 2' c Andreu 42' m Szarzewski 64' c Con: Machenaud (1/2) 3', 65'; Pen: Machenaud (5/5) 8', 40', 54', 75', 77'	Report	Try: Kleyn 20' c Earls 45' c Farrell 51' c Con: Keatley (3/3) 21', 47', 51'; Pen: Keatley (2/3) 56', 63'; Murray (1/3) 73'

U Arena
Attendance: 16,155
Referee: Matthew Carley (RFU)

14 January 2018
18:30

(1 BP) Castres (France)	39–0	(England) Leicester Tigers
Try: Urdapilleta 1' c Combezou (2) 24' c, 38' c Batlle (2) 47' m, 77' c Con: Urdapilleta (3/4) 1', 25', 39'; Le Bourhis (1/1) 77'; Pen: Urdapilleta (2/2) 14', 20'	Report

Stade Pierre-Fabre
Attendance: 8,400
Referee: Andrew Brace (IRFU)

21 January 2018
13:00

(1 BP) Leicester Tigers (England)	20–23	(France) Racing 92
Try: O'Connor 43' m Pen: G. Ford (5/5) 16', 28', 38', 64', 71'	Report	Try: Chavancy 6' c Machenaud 11' c Con: Machenaud (2/2) 7', 12'; Pen: Machenaud (3/3) 54', 69', 75'

Welford Road
Attendance: 18,165
Referee: Nigel Owens (WRU)

21 January 2018
16:00 (Note: Game was originally scheduled to kick off at 13:00 local time. However due to pitch conditions because of the weather, the game was delayed until 16:00 local time.)

(1 BP) Munster (Ireland)	48–3	(France) Castres
Try: Earls 32' c Marshall 44' c Penalty try 56'; Zebo 58' c Wootton 67' c Cronin 80'; Con: Keatley (3/3) 34', 45', 59'; Hanrahan (2/2) 68', 80'; Pen: Keatley (2/2) 17', 25'	Report	Pen: Kockott (1/1) 13'

Thomond Park
Attendance: 23,116
Referee: Ben Whitehouse (WRU)

=== Pool 5 ===
Team	P	W	D	L	PF	PA	Diff	TF	TA	TB	LB	Pts
(Wales) Scarlets (4)	6	4	0	2	162	123	+39	19	12	3	2	21
(France) Toulon (6)	6	4	0	2	159	125	+34	16	12	1	2	19
(England) Bath	6	4	0	2	151	121	+30	15	14	1	1	18
(Italy) Benetton	6	0	0	6	97	200	−103	12	25	2	2	4

14 October 2017
17:30

Bath (England)	23–0	(Italy) Benetton
Try: Mercer 39' c Brew 70' c Con: Lewis (2/2) 40', 71'; Pen: Lewis (3/3) 2', 5', 46'	Report

Recreation Ground
Attendance: 13,160
Referee: Mike Adamson (SRU)

15 October 2017
16:15

Toulon (France)	21–20	(Wales) Scarlets (1 BP)
Try: Escande 5' c Guirado 11' m Con: Belleau (1/2) 6'; Pen: Belleau (2/2) 9', 22'; Trinh-Duc (1/1) 63'	Report	Try: McNicholl 41' c Halfpenny 49' c Con: Halfpenny (2/2) 42', 50'; Pen: Halfpenny (2/4) 32', 59'

Stade Mayol
Attendance: 13,882
Referee: Luke Pearce (RFU)

20 October 2017
19:45

(1 BP) Scarlets (Wales)	13–18	(England) Bath
Try: S. Evans 22' c Con: Halfpenny (1/1) 22'; Pen: Halfpenny (2/2) 8', 73'	Report	Pen: Priestland (6/7) 5', 10', 29', 36', 55', 68'

Parc y Scarlets
Attendance: 11,479
Referee: Romain Poite (FFR)

21 October 2017
16:15

(1 BP) Benetton (Italy)	29–30	(France) Toulon
Try: Brex 6' c Gori 27' c Con: McKinley (2/2) 7', 28'; Pen: McKinley (5/7) 41', 59', 66', 73', 78'	Report	Try: Radradra 1' c Tuisova 45' m Con: Trinh-Duc (1/2) 1'; Pen: Trinh-Duc (5/5) 10', 36', 50', 62', 71', 80'

Stadio Comunale di Monigo
Attendance: 5,000
Referee: Matthew Carley (RFU)

9 December 2017
13:00

(1 BP) Scarlets (Wales)	33–28	(Italy) Benetton (2 BP)
Try: G. Davies (2) 2' c, 5' c Beirne 26' c S. Evans 75' c Asquith 78' m Con: Halfpenny (3/3) 2', 6', 27'; Patchell (1/2) 76'	Report	Try: Barbieri 13' c Hayward 36' c Esposito 56' c Ruzza 69' c Con: Allan (4/4) 14', 37', 57', 70'

Parc y Scarlets
Attendance: 6,856
Referee: Mathieu Raynal (FFR)

9 December 2017
16:15

Toulon (France)	24–20	(England) Bath (1 BP)
Try: Nonu 33' c Mathewson 50' c Belleau 75' c Con: Trinh-Duc (2/2) 35', 51'; Belleau (1/1) 77'; Pen: Trinh-Duc (1/1) 66'	Report	Try: Watson 14' c Joseph 60' c Con: Priestland (2/2) 15', 61'; Pen: Priestland (2/3) 12', 40'

Stade Mayol
Attendance: 13,541
Referee: Andrew Brace (IRFU)

16 December 2017
14:00

Benetton (Italy)	12–31	(Wales) Scarlets (1 BP)
Try: Ioane (2) 77' c, 80' m Con: McKinley (1/2) 79'	Report	Try: McNicholl 12' c Asquith 23' c G. Davies (2) 36' c, 43' c Con: Halfpenny (4/4) 14', 24', 37', 45'; Pen: Halfpenny (1/1) 8'

Stadio Comunale di Monigo
Attendance: 2,600
Referee: Romain Poite (FFR)

16 December 2017
16:15

Bath (England)	26–21	(France) Toulon (1 BP)
Try: Obano 1' c Watson (2) 27' m, 40' m Con: Priestland (1/3) 1'; Pen: Priestland (3/4) 9', 12', 55'	Report	Try: Mathewson 17' c Manoa 41' m Con: Trinh-Duc (1/2) 18'; Pen: Trinh-Duc (3/5) 26', 35', 64'

Recreation Ground
Attendance: 14,422
Referee: Nigel Owens (WRU)

12 January 2018
19:45

Bath (England)	17–35	(Wales) Scarlets (1 BP)
Try: Banahan 57' c Mercer 73' c Con: Burns (2/2) 57', 73'; Pen: Burns (1/1) 21'	Report	Try: Beirne 10' c Asquith 24' m Parkes 31' c S. Williams 50' c Con: D. Jones (3/4) 11', 32', 52'; Pen: D. Jones (3/3) 39', 68', 79'

Recreation Ground
Attendance: 13,822
Referee: Jérôme Garcès (FFR)

14 January 2018
14:00

(1 BP) Toulon (France)	36–0	(Italy) Benetton
Try: Belleau 7' c Tuisova (2) 42' c, 57' m Bastareaud 52' c Bonneval 67' c Con: Belleau (3/4) 7', 43', 53'; Trinh-Duc (1/1) 68'; Pen: Belleau (1/1) 38'	Report

Stade Mayol
Attendance: 13,489
Referee: Luke Pearce (RFU)

20 January 2018
18:30

(1 BP) Benetton (Italy)	28–47	(England) Bath (1 BP)
Try: Sperandio 12' c Negri 43' c Benvenuti 46' c Ioane 80' c Con: Allan (4/4) 13', 44', 47', 80'	Report	Try: Dunn 15' c Penalty try 21'; Banahan 29' c Watson 33' c Joseph 40' c Mercer 59' c Charteris 77' m Con: Burns (5/5) 16', 30', 33', 40', 60'

Stadio Comunale di Monigo
Attendance: 3,300
Referee: Pascal Gaüzère (FFR)

20 January 2018
17:30

Scarlets (Wales)	30–27	(France) Toulon (1 BP)
Try: Prydie 2' c Parkes 18' c D. Jones 34' c Con: D. Jones (3/3) 3', 20', 34'; Pen: D. Jones (2/2) 9', 24'; Patchell (1/1) 48'	Report	Try: Vermeulen 4' m Ashton 16' c Con: Belleau (1/2) 18'; Pen: Belleau (3/4) 14', 27', 40'; Trinh-Duc (2/2) 51', 56'

Parc y Scarlets
Attendance: 14,476
Referee: Wayne Barnes (RFU)
