= Jim Thorpe (disambiguation) =

Jim Thorpe (1887–1953) was a Native American athlete and Olympic gold medalist.

Jim Thorpe may also refer to:

- Jim Thorpe, Pennsylvania, United States
- Jim Thorpe (golfer) (born 1949), American professional golfer
- Jim Thorpe (Australian footballer) (1884–1962), Australian rules footballer
- Jim Thorpe (Canadian football) (1944–2020), American player of Canadian football
- Jimmy Thorpe (1913–1936), English footballer

== See also ==
- James Thorpe (disambiguation)
