= Chris Warburton =

British radio and podcast presenter

- Born: Christopher Ernest John Warburton; 15 December 1976 (age 49); Cuckfield, West Sussex, England
- Education: University of Leicester
- Presenting career
- Show: Drive
- Station: BBC Radio 5 Live
- Time slot: 16:00–19:00 Monday–Friday
- Show: 5 live in Short
- Station: BBC Radio 5 Live
- Time slot: 00:00–01:00 Sunday
- Country: United Kingdom
- Previous show: Saturday Edition

Christopher Ernest John Warburton (born 15 December 1976) is a British radio and podcast presenter who works for BBC Radio 5 Live. He presented the news and technology programme Saturday Edition on the station until October 2014, and since then has presented Saturday Breakfast alongside Eleanor Oldroyd and Sunday Breakfast, originally alongside Sam Walker, from 6 am to 9 am on both days. In addition, Warburton presented In Short, the best of BBC Radio 5 Live programme from 2013 to 2018. He has also covered for presenters on BBC Radio 6 Music and You and Yours on BBC Radio 4. Prior to this he presented the breakfast show on BBC Radio Wiltshire.

== Education ==
Warburton was educated at Warden Park School in Cuckfield, West Sussex. He then went to the University of Leicester and the Cardiff School of Journalism, Media and Cultural Studies.

== Radio career ==
Warburton presented the BBC true crime podcast Beyond Reasonable Doubt, which followed the criminal trial of Michael Peterson. The podcast was number one in the UK iTunes chart for six weeks. It won Silver in the True Crime category at the British Podcast Awards in 2018.

Warburton hosts the BBC podcast End of Days, which tells the story of the British people who joined the David Koresh led cult in Waco, Texas concentrating on the Waco siege. It won Bronze in the True Crime category at the British Podcast Awards in 2019.

In September 2020, Warburton released the BBC podcast, '‘Ecstasy: The Battle Of Rave’', which tells the tale of when Ecstasy and Acid House first swept Britain. The production is split into half real life and half fiction, with a series of monologues written by the BAFTA winning screenwriter, Danny Brocklehurst and starring Ade Edmondson, Meera Syal, David Morrissey, Monica Dolan and Ian Hart. The soundtrack was by The Hacienda legend Graeme Park (DJ). The Observer newspaper named the podcast in the top ten of 2020.

Warburton has broadcast live and presented programmes from two FIFA World Cups, the 2012 London Olympics and 2016 Rio de Janeiro Olympics, the Paris terror attacks, the Grenfell Tower fire, the British Grand Prix, the Grand National, the Diamond Jubilee of Queen Elizabeth II, the 2015 Rugby World Cup and the US Presidential election.

On 10 May 2015, Warburton presented coverage from the Service of Thanksgiving to mark the 70th anniversary of VE Day, live from Westminster Abbey.

On 2 June 2015, Warburton was involved in a world first, when he reported 'as live' throughout the duration of a heart transplant operation. This won the award for Best Factual Production at the BBC Radio Awards.

In October 2024, it was announced that Warburton would co-present Drive on BBC Radio 5 Live, starting from December 2024.

== Television work ==
Warburton has presented a number of films for The One Show on BBC One.

In June 2015, Warburton featured in series one of the Dave TV comedy, Hoff the Record. He played a radio presenter opposite the show's star, David Hasselhoff.

On 29 December 2015, he came second in Celebrity Mastermind with his specialist subject being Reeves & Mortimer. As of November 2018, Warburton became a reporter for The One Show on BBC One. One film focused on life changing brain surgery his father was undergoing for Essential tremor.

== Criticism of speech patterns ==
Warburton's speech patterns have been criticised by The Telegraph's radio critic Gillian Reynolds .
