= James Thorpe =

James Thorpe may refer to:

- James Thorpe (soccer) (born 1985), American soccer player
- James Thorpe (academic) (1915–2009), professor of English at Princeton University
- James Thorpe (TV producer), Canadian television producer, television writer
- James Thorpe (Ohio politician) (1927–2007), member of the Ohio House of Representatives
- James Thorpe (cricketer) (born 1991), English cricketer

== See also ==
- James Thorp (1937–2018), head of the Bradley Department of Electrical and Computer Engineering at Virginia Tech
- Jim Thorpe (disambiguation)
