= Warden Park Secondary Academy =

Location
- New England Road; Cuckfield; Haywards Heath, West Sussex; England; 51°00′15″N 0°08′00″W

Information
- Type: Academy
- Motto: The Best from All
- Established: 11 April 1957
- Local authority: West Sussex
- Department for Education URN: 137416 Tables
- Ofsted: Reports
- Chair of Governors: Jonathan Ash-Edwards
- Headteacher: Daniel Wynne-Willson
- Gender: Coeducational
- Age: 11 to 16
- Enrolment: c. 1,500
- Houses: 5 Houses: Europe, Oceania, Americas, Asia and Africa.
- Colours: Navy blue, yellow, and black
- Website: wardenpark.co.uk

Warden Park Secondary Academy is a coeducational secondary school in Cuckfield (near Haywards Heath), West Sussex, England.

== Description ==
There are approximately 1,500 students at the school, from 11 to 16 years old. The headteacher is Dan Wynne Wilson, who started in September 2024. The chair of the governing body is Jonathan Ash-Edwards.

The school's 2012 Ofsted report said: "Academic attainment is consistently above average and often high." Its 2015 Ofsted report said: "Staff model respectful behaviour and require high standards."

== History ==
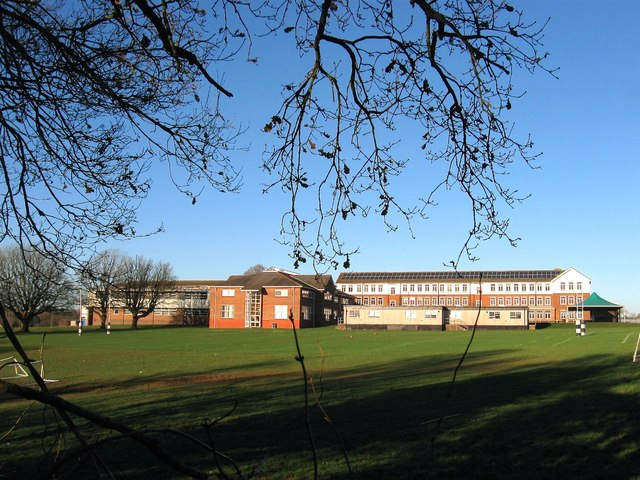
Warden Park Secondary Academy, 2014

The school opened in September 1956 as Cuckfield County Secondary School and was later renamed Warden Park School. It became an academy in September 2011 and was renamed Warden Park Secondary Academy. It is partnered with Warden Park Primary Academy. Both academies are part of the Sussex Learning Trust.

== Notable alumni ==
- Patience Agbabi, poet and spoken-word performer
- James Chisholm, professional rugby union player for Harlequins and England Saxons
- Ross Chisholm, professional rugby union player for Harlequins
- Gwendoline Christie, actress
- Charlotte Kerwood, sports shooter
- Tom McGill, goalkeeper for Brighton and Hove Albion
- Dale de Neef, Trinidadian-born Scottish cricketer
- Mat Osman, bassist in the band Suede
- Richard Osman, television presenter
- Steffan Piolet, cricketer for Warwickshire County Cricket Club and Sussex County Cricket Club
- James Thorpe, cricketer for Sussex
- Chris Warburton, radio presenter
- Roy Winters, ex-professional rugby union player for England, Harlequins, Bristol
