= Katie Stewart (writer) =

British cookery writer (1934–2013)

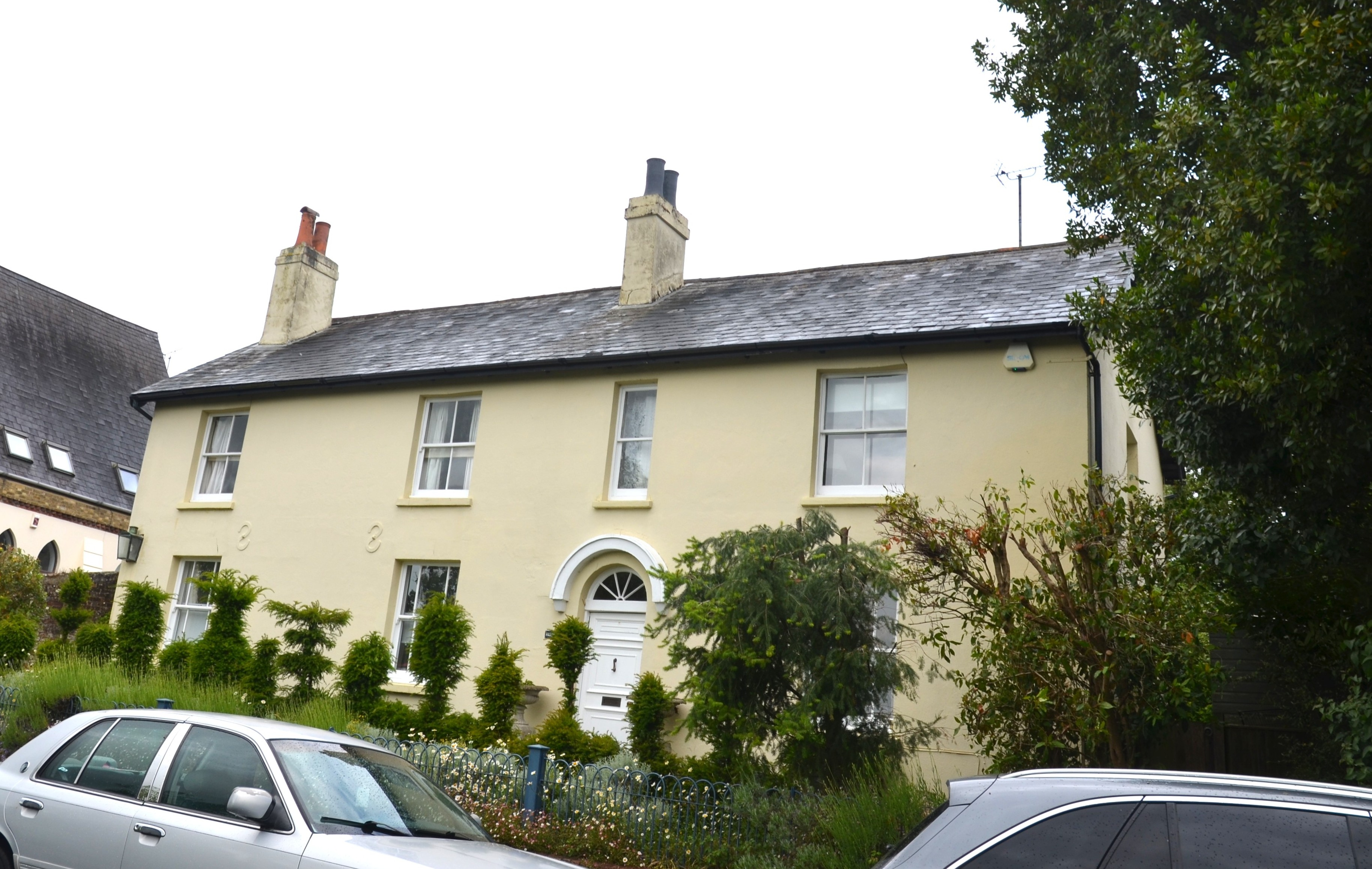
Farthings, Katie Stewart's home in Cuckfield, West Sussex from 1968.

Katharine Elizabeth Allen Stewart (23 July 1934 – 13 January 2013) was a British cookery writer whose columns in The Times made her a household name in the 1960s and 1970s. After training at the Westminster Hotel School, she worked as nanny for a rich family in Paris, where she gained a diploma from the Cordon Bleu school, and then spent two years working in the test kitchens of the Nestlé company in White Plains, New York. There she learned how to record recipes accurately and how to prepare food to be photographed.

On return to England in 1959 she joined the magazine company Fleetway Publications as a junior cookery writer, and in 1966 became cookery editor on the Woman's Journal, a post she held for 32 years. In 1966 she also began to contribute to The Times, where until 1978 she had a column every Saturday and a whole page of recipes once a month. In 1972 she published The Times Cookery Book, a classic of which her obituary in The Telegraph said:

"Unlike some recipe books from the early 1970s, Katie Stewart's book remains timelessly useful. Alongside the glossily pristine productions of Gordon Ramsay, Sophie Dahl, Ottolenghi et al, The Times Cookery Book is almost always recognizable from its broken spine and pages dog-eared and stained with the oil and gravy of many years' service. Clean replacements are hard to find."

She published a number of other books, including The Pooh Cook Book (1971) and The Sociable Cook (2001), and in the early 1970s made three series of Cooking with Katie programmes for Grampian Television.
