= Oathall Community College =

Location
- Appledore Gardens; Haywards Heath, West Sussex, RH16 2AQ; England; 51.00622°N 0.09204°W

Information
- Type: Community school
- Established: 1938
- Local authority: West Sussex County Council
- Department for Education URN: 126085 Tables
- Ofsted: Reports
- Headteacher: Toby Houghton
- Staff: c. 161
- Gender: Coeducational
- Age: 11 to 16
- Enrolment: c. 1,067 students
- Houses: Discovery , Endeavor , Pioneer , Voyager
- Colours: Maroon and yellow
- Website: http://www.oathall.org/

Oathall Community College is a coeducational secondary school located between Lindfield and Haywards Heath in West Sussex, England. There are currently around 1067 students at Oathall, between the ages of 11 and 16. The college has a full spectrum of specialist accommodation, including a 5-acre (20,000 m^{2}) farm, a music centre, specialist art building, recently refurbished Science and Maths building, conference facilities and well-equipped classrooms. They have a rolling programme of building development and refurbishment to reach all parts of the school over the next 10 to 15 years.

Oathall serves Haywards Heath and surrounding areas, accommodating students from Ardingly, Horsted Keynes, Burgess Hill, Scaynes Hill and Danehill.

== Oathall Community College Farm ==
The college's farm was founded during World War II by the head teacher to help the war effort. Today, students can take a NVQ level one in agriculture and in land-based operations (horticulture and farm machinery) and a level two specialist diploma in environmental and land-based studies, as well as before- and after-school volunteer opportunities in the Young Farmers' Club (YFC). The farm is also incorporated into other subjects, such as mathematics, where students study the growth rates of lambs. The farm's livestock regularly wins prizes, including pig of the year at the South of England Show in 2008.

== Developments and modernisation ==
Many new developments to the campus have been completed recently, including a refurbished Science and Maths (SAM) building, Art Block and a new Food Technology department.

The school is currently undergoing a rolling program of refurbishment, due to be complete in all areas of the school by 2030.

=== Refurbished Language Block ===
During mid-2019, the Modern Foreign Languages building was refurbished with new flooring, interactive touchscreen whiteboards, and general furniture.

=== Refurbished Science and Maths Block ===
Renovations on the school's Science and Maths Block began in 2017 and the building was closed to students while construction was taking place.

The old SCOLA building was constructed in 1974 as a result of the increase in the school leaving age from 15 to 16 and the associated increase in students. The old building housed numerous flaws, such as poor insulation, over-glazing and inadequate heating which made for uncomfortable working environments. The building also contained asbestos.

The building renovations were financially backed by West Sussex County Council and funds for new equipment were crowdfunded by the school's parent teacher association, raising a total of £29,468.

In September 2018, the new building was reopened, featuring eight maths classrooms, eight science labs, an IT suite, and two science preparation and storage rooms. The building features air conditioning, carbon dioxide monitoring systems, open-plan unisex toilets, new fire alarm systems, new automated display boards and new interactive whiteboards.

=== Art department ===
One of the old wooden hut classrooms was demolished in 2006 to make way for the building of a modernised and better-facilitated art and design building.

== Noteable Alumni ==
- Brett Anderson, singer in the band Suede
- Michael Ward, literary critic and Catholic priest
