= Dale de Neef =

Trinidadian-born Scottish cricketer

Personal information
- Full name: Dale Nicholas de Neef
- Born: 21 March 1956 (age 70); Pointe-à-Pierre, British Trinidad
- Batting: Right-handed
- Bowling: Right-arm fast-medium

Domestic team information
- Years: Team
- 1983–1986: Scotland

Career statistics
| Competition | List A |
|---|---|
| Matches | 11 |
| Runs scored | 63 |
| Batting average | 7.00 |
| 100s/50s | –/– |
| Top score | 18* |
| Balls bowled | 512 |
| Wickets | 11 |
| Bowling average | 37.36 |
| 5 wickets in innings | – |
| 10 wickets in match | – |
| Best bowling | 3/14 |
| Catches/stumpings | –/– |
- Source: Cricinfo, 26 October 2022

Dale Nicholas de Neef (born 21 March 1956) is a Trinidadian-born Scottish former cricketer.

De Neef was born in British Trinidad at Pointe-à-Pierre in March 1956. He was educated in Trinidad at St Peter's School, before emigrating to England as a child, where he continued his education in Sussex at Cuckfield County Secondary School and Ardingly College. From there he matriculated to Thames Polytechnic. Having played club cricket in the Sussex League, de Neef moved to Scotland in 1978 and began playing for Aberdeenshire in 1979. Strong performances for Aberdeenshire led to his selection for Scotland in the 1983 Benson & Hedges Cup, with de Neef making his debut in List A one-day cricket against Worcestershire at Aberdeen. He played one-day cricket for Scotland until 1986, making a total of eleven appearances, the majority of which came in the Benson & Hedges Cup, with a lone appearance in the 1984 NatWest Trophy against Essex at Chelmsford. Playing as a right-arm fast-medium bowler, he took 11 wickets in his eleven matches at an average of 37.36, with best figures of 3 for 14. As a lower order batsman, he scored 63 runs with a highest score of 18 not out.
