= Thomas Vicars =

Thomas Vicars (1589 – 1638) was a 17th-century English theologian and rhetorician.

He was born in Carlisle in Cumberland (now Cumbria), the son of William and Eve Vicars. He entered Queen's College, Oxford in 1607 as a poor serving child. He then became a tabarder, chaplain and fellow within nine years. In 1622, he was admitted to the reading of the sentences. Recognised as a learned theologian, he entered the household of George Carleton, the Bishop of Chichester, whose step-daughter, Anne, the daughter of the sometime Ambassador to France, Henry Neville of Billingbear House in Berkshire, he married. Carleton made him Vicar of Cuckfield in West Sussex.

His works include:

- Translation of Bartholomew Keckermann's Latin 'Manuduction to Theology', dedicated to 'Lady Anne Neville' (his mother-in-law) and 'Lady Anne Fettiplace of Childrey' in Berkshire, the mother of John Fettiplace MP (1620)
- 'Manuductio ad artem rhetoricam' (1621)
- 'A Brief Direction on how to examine Ourselves before we go to the Lord's Table' (1622)
- 'Confutatio cusjd' (1627)
