= George Carleton (bishop) =

English churchman

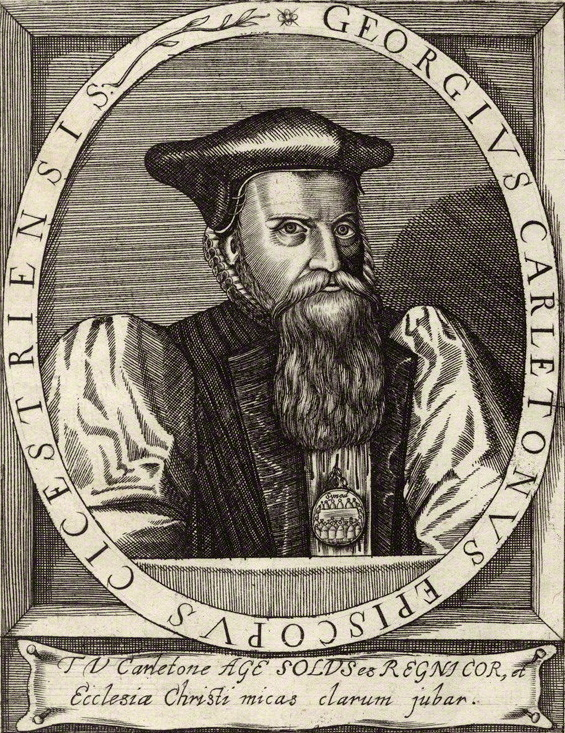
Bishop Carleton

George Carleton (1557/8 – 12 May 1628) was an English churchman who was Bishop of Llandaff from 1618 to 1619 and Bishop of Chichester from 1619 to 1628. He was a delegate to the Synod of Dort, in the Netherlands.

== Life ==
He was the son of Guy Carleton of Carleton Hall in Cumberland, born at Norham in Northumberland, where his father was warder of Norham Castle. His early education was under Bernard Gilpin, the "Apostle of the North", at the Royal Kepier Grammar School in Houghton-le-Spring, Durham. In 1576 he was sent to St Edmund Hall, Oxford; in 1579 he took his M.A., and in 1580 was elected fellow of Merton College, Oxford. Here he won a reputation as a poet and orator, and a skilful disputant in theology, well read in the Church fathers and schoolmen.

In 1589 he became vicar of Mayfield, Sussex, which he held till 1605, and in 1618 he was made bishop of Llandaff. In the same year he was selected by James I of England, with three others, to represent the church of England at the synod of Dort. Here he protested against the adoption of the thirty-first article of the Belgic Confession, which affirmed "that the ministers of the Word of God, in what place soever settled, have the same advantage of character, the same jurisdiction and authority, in regard they are all equally ministers of Christ, the only universal Bishop and Head of the Church." Carleton maintained the doctrine of apostolical succession in opposition to this levelling article; his protest was ineffectual. When the English deputies returned home in the spring of 1619, the Dutch States, besides paying the expenses of their voyage and presenting each with a gold medal, sent a letter to the king in which commendation is made of Carleton as the foremost man of the company and a model of learning and piety.

He was translated to Chichester in the same year. He died on 12 May 1628. Carleton was the patron of Thomas Vicars, the noted theologian, who married his step-daughter. The bishop's son, Henry Carleton, represented Arundel in the parliament of 1640, and afterwards served in the parliamentary army.

== Works ==
The following is an incomplete list of his works:

- Heroici Characteres, Oxon. 1603, 4to.
- Consensus Ecclesiae Catholicae contra Tridentinos ... 1613, 8vo.
- Carmen panegyricum ad Eliz. Angl. Reg., in vol. iii. of John Nichols's Progresses of Queen Elizabeth, p. 180.
- Vita Bernardi Gilpini ... apud Anglos Aquilonares celeberrimi, 1628, 4to.
- Life of Bernard Gilpin, with the Sermon preached before Edward VI in 1552, London, 1636,8vo.
- Epistola ad Jacobum Sextum Brit. Regem' in the Miscellany of the Abbotsford Club (i. 1 13), Edinburgh, 1837.
- Tithes examined and proved to be due to the Clergie by a Divine Right, 1606, 4to, second edit. 1611.
- Jurisdiction Regall, Episcopall, papall, 1610, 4to.
- Directions to know the True Church, 1615, 8vo.
- An Oration made at the Hague before the Prince of Orange and the States Generall of the United Provinces, 1619, 4to.
- A Thankful Remembrance of God's Mercy in an Historicall Collection of the ... Deliverances of the Church and State of England ... from the beginning of Q. Elizabeth, London, 1624, 4to. Several editions.
- Astrologomania, the Madnesse of Astrologes; or, an Examination of Sir Christopher Heydon's Booke, intituled, 'A Defence of Judiciarie Astrologie', London, 1624, 4to.
- An Examination of those Things wherein the Author of the late "Appeale" holdeth the Doctrine of the Church of the Pelasgians and Arminians to be the Doctrines of the Church of England., London, 1626, 4to.
- His Testimony concerning the Presbyterian Discipline in the Low Countries and Episcopall Government here in England, London, 1642, 8vo.

Church of England titles
Preceded by Fraser Godwin	Bishop of Llandaff; 1618–1619	Succeeded by Theophilus Field
Preceded by Samuel Harsnett	Bishop of Chichester; 1619–1628	Succeeded by Richard Montagu
