= James Chisholm (rugby union) =

English rugby union player

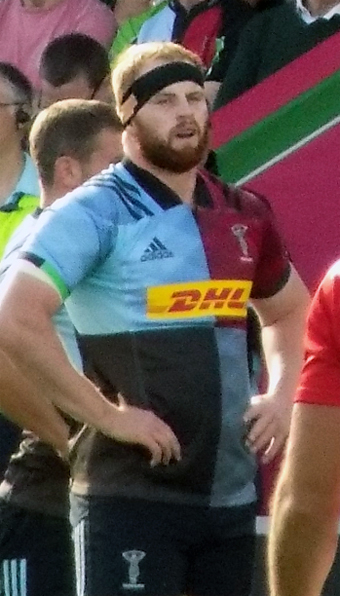
- Chisholm playing for Harlequins in 2019
- Born: James Robert Chisholm; 11 August 1995 (age 31) Haywards Heath, England
- Height: 1.88 m (6 ft 2 in)
- Weight: 105 kg (16 st 7 lb; 231 lb).
- School: Brighton College; Warden Park School
- Notable relative: Ross Chisholm (Brother)

Rugby union career
- Position(s): Number 8, Flanker, Lock
- Current team: Harlequins
Youth career
- Haywards Heath RFC
Senior career
| Years | Team | Apps | (Points) |
| 2013–2026 | Harlequins | 164 | (105) |
| 2014–2016 | →London Scottish (loan) | 12 | (10) |
- Correct as of 12 January 2025
International career
| Years | Team | Apps | (Points) |
| 2013 | England U18 | 8 | (30) |
| 2013–2015 | England U20 | 18 | (35) |
| 2016 | England Saxons | | |
- Correct as of 12 April 2017

James Robert Chisholm (born 11 August 1995) is a former English professional rugby union player, who played for Harlequins in the Gallagher Premiership. His primary position was Number Eight, but he could also play at flanker and Lock.

== Background ==
Chisholm, youngest of the three Chisholm brothers (Ali, Ross who is also a professional rugby player), was born in Haywards Heath, Sussex, to Peter and Sue Chisholm. He took up the game with Haywards Heath RFC. Chisholm was educated in London Meed Primary School and Warden Park. He later attended sixth-form at Brighton College and captained the school's 1st XV.

Outside of rugby, Chisholm is also the former Sussex Under 18 high jump champion.

== Club career ==
=== Harlequins ===
2013–2014

Chisholm joined the full-time Harlequins Academy in July 2013 and made his senior debut that same year against Exeter Chiefs in the LV= Cup. The back-row made his starting debut a week later, and played the full 80 minutes in the victory over Sale Sharks in the same competition.

2014–2015

While on-loan playing for the RFU Championship side London Scottish, Chisholm made a total of 10 appearances and scored 2 tries during the 2014–2015 season.

On 13 October 2014, it was a special occasion when Chisholm was joined by his 2 older brothers Ali and Ross to play for Harlequins A against Exeter Braves in the A-league.

2015–2016

The 2015 Six Nations Champion and 2015 World Rugby Under 20 Championship Finalist signed a dual contract with London Scottish. He later made 2 appearances against Rotherham Titans and Moseley in the season.

2016–2017

After being involved in the victorious England Saxons tour in South Africa during the 2016 June international window and a strong pre-season with Harlequins, Chisholm started the 2016–2017 campaign brightly and produced a Man of the Match performance in the opening round of European Rugby Challenge Cup match against Stade Français. He crossed over the try line two times and out-gunned his opposite number Sergio Parisse during the pool match.

In November 2016, Chisholm re-signed for Harlequins.

At the end of the season, Chisholm was named IG's Players' Player of the Season, DHL's Player of the Season and the Nick Duncombe Young Player of the Season.

2020–2021

He scored a try after coming on as a replacement during Harlequins 43-36 defeat of Bristol Bears in the Premiership semi-final, a game in which Quins recovered from 28 points down to win. He started the following week in the Premiership final against Exeter as Harlequins won the game 40-38 in the highest scoring Premiership final ever.

2024–25

In December 2024, he scored a try and won player of the match during Harlequins 38–14 away defeat of Newcastle Falcons. In January 2025, having been moved into the second row for the first time while playing for the club, he scored a try in 24–7 against Glasgow Warriors to help Harlequins secure their place in the knockout stages of the 2024–25 Champions Cup.

== International career ==
England U18

Chisholm captained England U18 to a 57–13 win over Scotland on his debut at Darlington in March 2013. He also led the side to a 27–22 victory over hosts France at Grenoble in the subsequent FIRA/AER Final and scored three tries in the tournament.

During the summer tour to South Africa, Chisholm touch downed two times in the opening match against South Africa and he captained the side in all three games that produced wins over Wales by 17–15 and France by 12–8.

In December 2013, the Harlequins Number Eight reclaimed the armband in his last U18 international match and led his England U18 side to a convincing 23–3 win over Australia Schoolboys at Harrow School.

England U20

Chisholm's maiden try for England U20 was against Scotland at Galashiels in February 2014 and he shared in the side's IRB Junior World Championship triumph in New Zealand the following June, playing in all five matches. He scored two tries in the 63–3 pool win over Italy. James added another when England lost 21–15 to Wales at Colwyn Bay in the opening game of the 2015 Six Nations Under 20s Championship and made his fifth touchdown at this level against Scotland that March. He also scored tries against France and South Africa during the World Championship in Italy in June 2015.

Chisholm was the BMW Man of the Match in successive games against Scotland and France and said after England clinched the 2015 Six Nations title: “It was amazing but tough at times. We knew it would come and it doesn't get better than this. It was tremendous to do it here in Brighton.”

Subsequently, he was named World Rugby Junior Player of the Year 2015.

England Saxons

In Summer 2016, Chisholm was named in the England Saxons squad's tour to South Africa for the 2-match series against South African A team.

== Honours ==
- World Rugby Junior Player of the Year 2015
