= Charlie Cassang =

French rugby union player

- Born: Charlie Cassang; 8 February 1995 (age 31) France
- Height: 1.73 m (5 ft 8 in)
- Weight: 80 kg (12 st 8 lb; 180 lb)

Rugby union career
- Position: Scrum-half
- Current team: Oyonnax
Senior career
Years	Team	Apps	(Points)
2015–2020	Clermont	48	(40)
2015–2016	→ Bayonne (loan)	12	(0)
2020–	Oyonnax	78	(109)
- Correct as of 21 May 2023

Charlie Cassang (born 8 February 1995) is a French rugby union player. His position is scrum-half and he currently plays for Oyonnax in the Pro D2.

Having passed through the ASM Clermont training center, where he finished his training, he won the French Championship in 2017. Then, he joined Oyonnax in 2020, where he was crowned Pro D2 champion in 2023.
