= James Thorpe (cricketer) =

English cricketer

Personal information
- Full name: James Ashley Thorpe
- Born: 20 January 1991 (age 35); Geneva, Switzerland
- Batting: Right-handed
- Bowling: Right-arm medium-fast

Domestic team information
- Years: Team
- 2010: Sussex

Career statistics
| Competition | List A |
|---|---|
| Matches | 1 |
| Runs scored | 3 |
| Batting average | – |
| 100s/50s | –/– |
| Top score | 3* |
| Balls bowled | 18 |
| Wickets | 1 |
| Bowling average | 26.00 |
| 5 wickets in innings | – |
| 10 wickets in match | – |
| Best bowling | 1/26 |
| Catches/stumpings | –/– |
- Source: Cricinfo, 21 June 2012

James Ashley Thorpe (born 20 January 1991) is an English cricketer. Thorpe is a right-handed batsman who bowls right-arm medium-fast. He was born in Switzerland at Geneva. Thorpe was educated at Warden Park School and Haywards Heath Sixth Form College, before attending the University of Bath.

Thorpe made a single List A appearance for Sussex against the touring Bangladeshis at the County Ground, Hove, in 2010. Batting at number ten, Adkin contributed 3 runs to Sussex's total of 253 all out, ending the innings not out. He took the wicket of Tamim Iqbal in the Bangladeshis innings, finishing with figures of 1/26 from three overs. Sussex dismissing the Bangladeshis for 104 to win the match by 149 runs. In August 2010, Thorpe made two Youth One Day Internationals for England Under-19s against Sri Lanka Under-19s, with both appearances coming at Arundel Castle Cricket Ground. In that same month he played a single Youth Twenty20 International against the same opposition at the Riverside Ground, Chester-le-Street.
