= Jim Thorpe (Australian footballer) =

Australian rules footballer

Personal information
- Full name: James Lyell Thorpe
- Born: 21 October 1884; Essendon, Victoria
- Died: 25 September 1962 (aged 77); Wyong, New South Wales
- Height: 175 cm (5 ft 9 in)

Playing career^{1}
Years	Club	Games (Goals)
1908	Fitzroy	2 (0)
- ^{1} Playing statistics correct to the end of 1908.

James Lyell Thorpe (21 October 1884 – 25 September 1962) was an Australian rules footballer who played with Fitzroy in the Victorian Football League (VFL).
