= Alexi Balès =

- Born: Alexi Balès; 30 May 1990 (age 36) Fumel, France
- Height: 1.74 m (5 ft 8 1/2 in)
- Weight: 75 kg (11 st 11 lb)

Rugby union career
- Position: Scrum-half
- Current team: Toulouse
Senior career
Years	Team	Apps	(Points)
2009–2016	Agen	126	(67)
2016–2020	La Rochelle	79	(193)
2020–2022	Toulouse	35	(2)
- Correct as of 20 September 2022
International career
Years	Team	Apps	(Points)
2010	France U20	8	(15)
2018	French Barbarians	1	(2)
- Correct as of 10 November 2018

Alexi Balès (born 30 May 1990) is a French rugby union player. His position is scrum-half and he currently plays for Stade Toulousain in the Top 14. He began his career at Agen.
