= Cuckfield =

Village and parish in West Sussex, England

Coordinates: 51.0096°N 0.1407°W

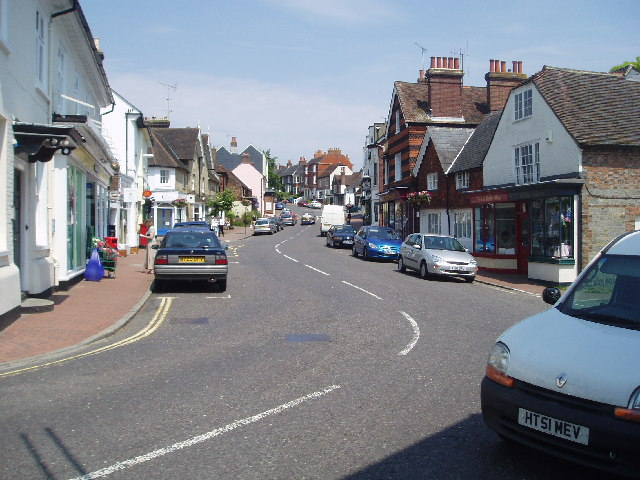
- Cuckfield High Street

- Location within West Sussex
- Interactive map of Cuckfield
- Area: 4.32 km^{2} (1.67 sq mi)
- Population: 3,266 2001 Census; 3,500 (2011 Census)
  - Density: 757/km^{2} (1,960/sq mi)
- OS grid reference: TQ305245
  - London: 34 miles (55 km) N
- Civil parish: Cuckfield
- District: Mid Sussex
- Shire county: West Sussex
- Region: South East
- Country: England
- Sovereign state: United Kingdom
- Post town: Haywards Heath
- Postcode district: RH17
- Dialling code: 01444
- Police: Sussex
- Fire: West Sussex
- Ambulance: South East Coast
- UK Parliament: Mid Sussex

Cuckfield (/ˈkʊkfiːld/ KUUK-feeld) is a village and civil parish in the Mid Sussex District of West Sussex, England, on the southern slopes of the Weald. It lies 34 miles (55 km) south of London, 13 miles (21 km) north of Brighton, and 31 miles (50 km) east northeast of the county town of Chichester. Nearby towns include Haywards Heath to the southeast and Burgess Hill to the south. It is surrounded on the other sides by the parish of Ansty and Staplefield formerly known as Cuckfield Rural.

Aumale in Normandy has been a twin town since 1993 and Karlstadt in Bavaria since 1998.

== History ==
The origin of the name, Cuckfield (earlier spelled Kukefeld, Cucufeld, and Cucufelda), is debated but it is generally associated with the cuckoo which is the village emblem.

The village grew as a market town; and an important coaching stop between London and Brighton, since it lay on the turnpike. In 1820, 50 coaches a day were passing through; but when the railway to Brighton was to be constructed in the 1840s, local landowners objected to its projected route: it was therefore built through neighbouring Haywards Heath instead. The village lost its importance as a result. Today the A272 road also bypasses the village centre.

It became an urban district in 1894 under the Local Government Act 1894, and was greatly enlarged in 1934 under a County Review Order by adding part of Chailey Rural District, Cuckfield Rural District (including the parish of Lindfield) and Haywards Heath Urban District.

The Parish Council, Cuckfield Museum and village library reside within the Queen's Hall, built in 1897 to celebrate Queen Victoria's Diamond Jubilee. The parish church, dedicated to the Holy Trinity, has Norman foundations, although the building itself is 13th century. The lych gates are listed buildings and several of the stained glass windows as well as the pulpit and the ceiling's painting were designed by Charles Eamer Kempe (1837–1907).

In 1822, Mary Ann Mantell, wife of Gideon Mantell, found the first known iguanodon fossils among many others close to Cuckfield at Whitemans Green, where a monument to him now stands though the quarry from where he acquired them is long gone. He also features in the town's museum. Other attractions include the Elizabethan stately home, Cuckfield Park, to the west of the village. Cuckfield Park is reputedly haunted by its former resident Anne Pritchard Sergison, who was known to the locals as 'Wicked Dame Sergison', and who died in 1748. Bonfire Night celebrations are held here. Another Elizabethan house, Ockenden Manor, is a hotel and restaurant which has had one star from the Michelin Guide in 2001 and again 2004–2016.

== Geography ==
Before the modern local government system came into operation in the late 19th century it was described as being in the hundred of Buttinghill, in the Rape of Lewes. The civil parish covers an area of 431.58 ha (1066 acres), and had a population of 3,266 persons in the 2001 census, increasing to 3,500 at the 2011 Census.

== Schools ==
Cuckfield is home to Warden Park Secondary Academy, one of the main secondary schools serving the Haywards Heath area and to Holy Trinity CE (A) Primary School, Cuckfield. The latter is one of the oldest schools in the country; it was founded in the early 1500s as the local grammar school. The founder was Edward Flower, a London merchant tailor in about 1512 and endowed by his will in 1521 with lands in Westerham and £100 to be laid out in other lands. Other endowments were added, but in 1589, the original endowment was leased at a perpetual rent of £20. In consequence in 1819, the schoolmaster had an income of a mere £28.8s.0d. In 1844, as a result of local discontent, the Court of Chancery made a scheme reorganising the school like a National School and the existing National School (established in 1812) was discontinued. The teaching of Latin and Greek were discontinued and the fees fixed at a maximum of a shilling. The teacher no longer had to be a clergyman.

In 1886, the National Society gave £15 and the school formally became a National School. A proposal to rebuild the school between 1935 and 1950, and money collected for this was returned to the donors. The school was reorganised again in 1964 under the Chichester Diocesan Board of Finance. In 1991, the school was rebuilt on a new site. The old school was acquired by the church in 1992 for use as a church hall.

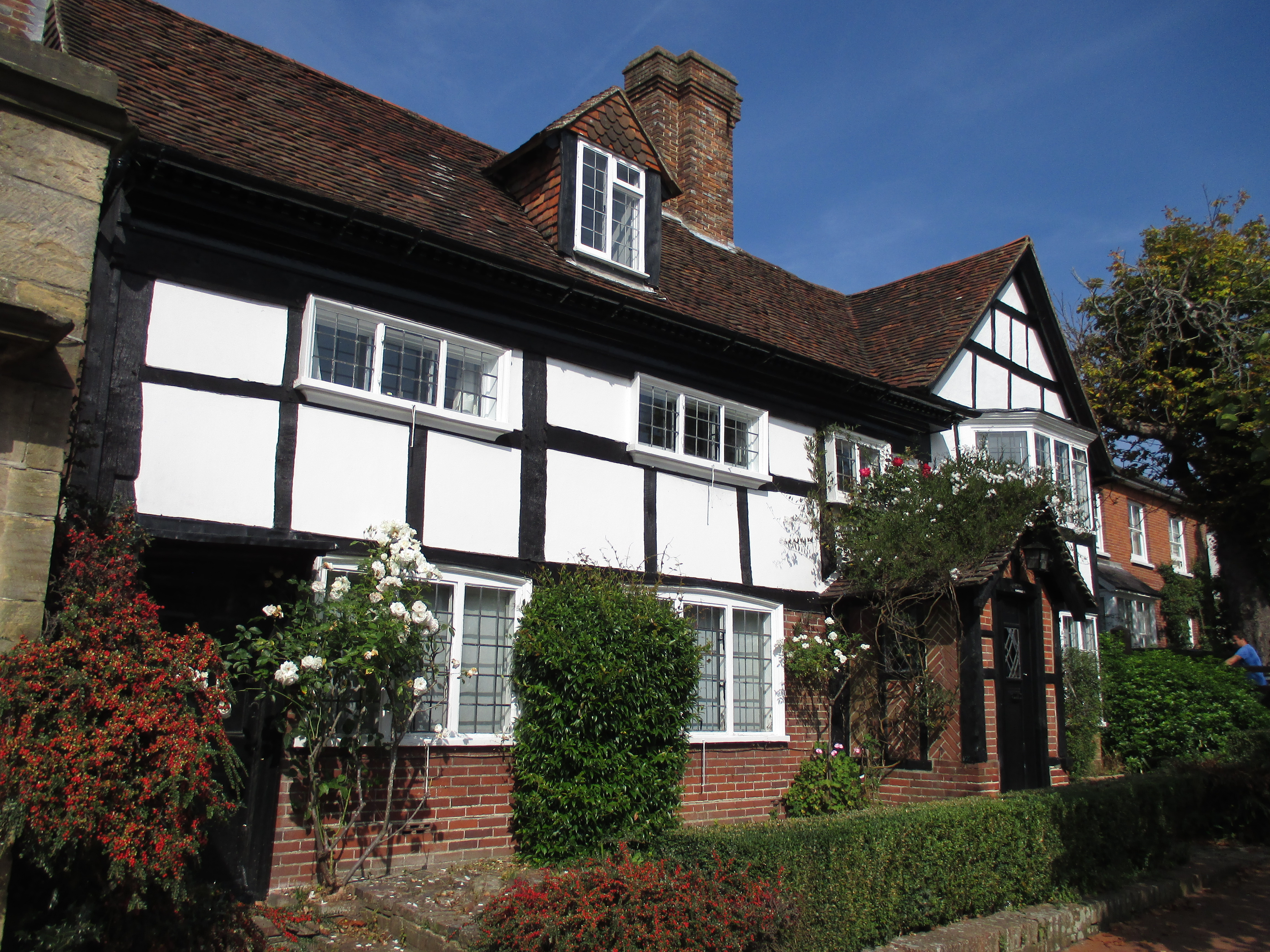
Kingsleys (formerly Attrees), where the Victorian novelist Henry Kingsley lived

== Notable people ==
- Natasha Bedingfield (born 1981 in Cuckfield) – singer, songwriter and record producer
- Daniel Betts (born 1971 in Cuckfield) – actor
- Ross Chisholm (born 1990 in Cuckfield) – Harlequins rugby player
- Hermione Cockburn (born 1973) – geologist and broadcaster, was brought up in the village
- Tommy Cook (1901–50) – Sussex cricketer and Brighton & Hove Albion and England footballer, born in Cuckfield
- Kirsten Cooke (born 1952 in Cuckfield) – actress
- Alfred Denning, Baron Denning (1899–1999) resided in Cuckfield from 1935 until 1963
- Dom Dwyer (born 1990 in Cuckfield) – footballer who represented the United States national team
- Tara Fitzgerald (born 1967 in Cuckfield) – actress
- The brothers Edward, James (both actors) and Robert Fox (a producer) all grew up in the village; their mother died there in 1999
- Sally Geeson (born 1950) – actress, best remembered for her role in the British sitcom Bless This House with Sid James was born in the village
- Dominic Glynn (born 1960 in Cuckfield) – composer of Doctor Who between 1986 and 1989
- Mike Hazlewood (1941–2001) – singer, songwriter and composer, born in Cuckfield
- Charles Silvester Horne (1865-1914) - Congregationalist minister, Liberal MP and writer, born in Cuckfield son of local Congregational minister and lived there until six weeks old.
- Henry Kingsley (1830–1876) – novelist, lived in Cuckfield for his last two years
- Nancy Osbaldeston (born 1989) – ballet dancer and principal dancer of Royal Ballet of Flanders
- Charles Sergison (1655–1732) – owner of Cuckfield Park
- Katie Stewart (1934–2013) – British cookery writer, lived for many decades and died in Cuckfield
- Jamie Theakston (born 1970 in Cuckfield) – television presenter, producer, and actor.
- Nick Van Eede (born 1958 in Cuckfield) – lead vocalist and co-founder of the British-based band Cutting Crew
- Thomas Vicars (1589–1638) – 17th-century theologian, Vicar of Holy Trinity, Cuckfield (1622–1638)
- James Vince (born 1991 in Cuckfield) – Hampshire and England cricketer
