= Romain Ruffenach =

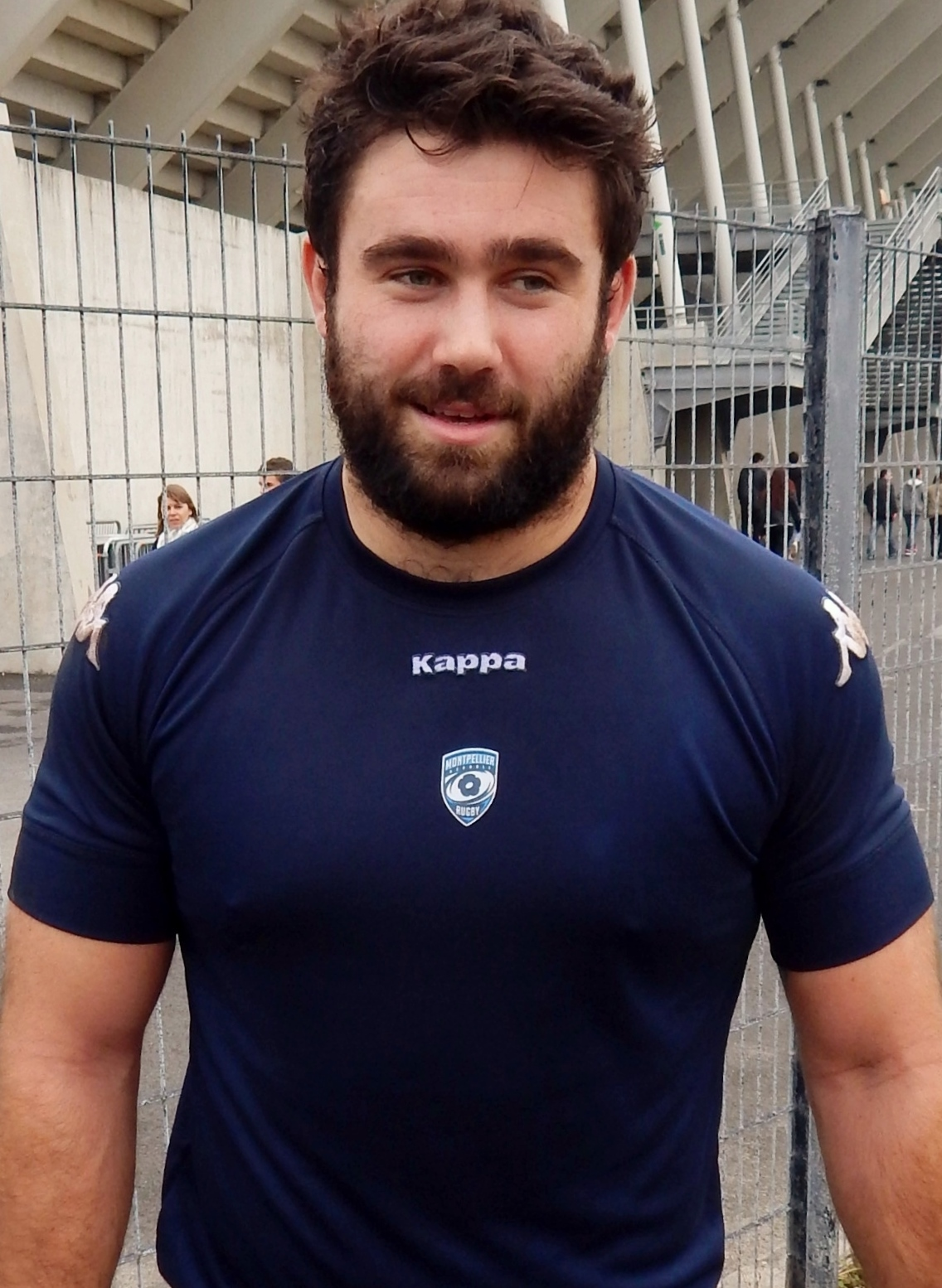
- Born: 4 September 1994 (age 32) Tours, France
- Height: 1.85 m (6 ft 1 in)
- Weight: 100 kg (15 st 10 lb; 220 lb)

Rugby union career
- Position: Hooker
- Current team: Montpellier
Youth career
- 2010–2012: Stade Rochelais
Senior career
| Years | Team | Apps | (Points) |
| 2012–2016 | Biarritz Olympique | 67 | (35) |
| 2016–present | Montpellier | 10 | (0) |
- Correct as of 7 January 2017

Romain Ruffenach (born 4 September 1994) is a French Rugby Union player. His position is Hooker and he currently plays for French side Montpellier in the Top 14 competition.
