= Ross Chisholm (rugby union) =

English rugby union player

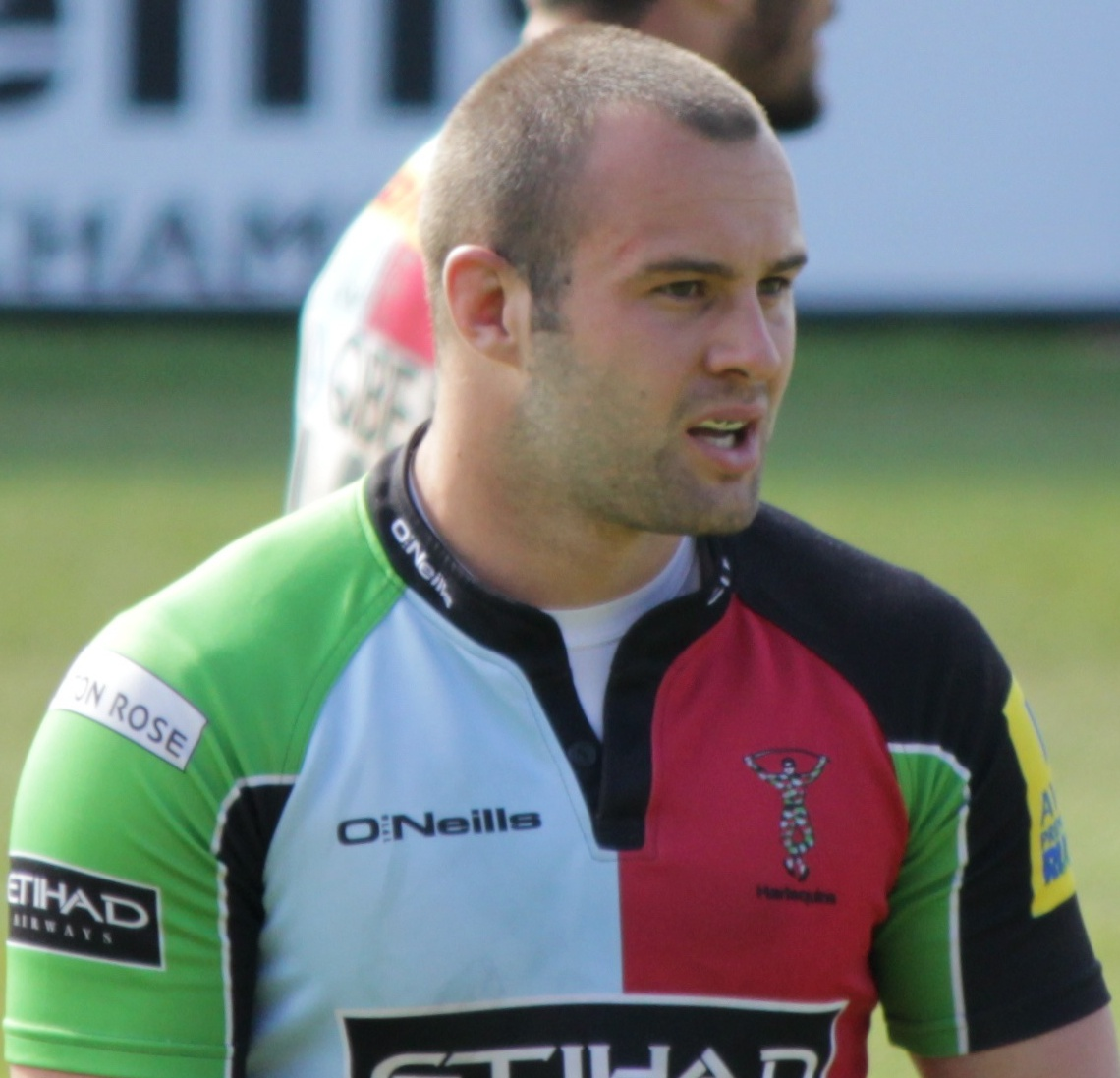
- Chisholm during the Aviva Premiership in 2013
- Born: Ross James Chisholm; 19 October 1990 (age 36) Cuckfield, England
- Height: 1.83 m (6 ft 0 in)
- Weight: 90 kg (14 st 2 lb; 198 lb)
- School: Warden Park; Brighton College
- Notable relative: James Chisholm (Brother) Alastair Chisholm

Rugby union career
- Position: Fullback / Wing
- Current team: Harlequins
Youth career
- Harlequins
Senior career
Years	Team	Apps	(Points)
2011-2023	Harlequins	128	(165)

Ross Chisholm (born 19 October 1990 in Cuckfield, England), is an English professional rugby union player for Harlequins in the Gallagher Premiership. He is a Fullback, also playing on the Wing.

== Background ==
Chisholm started playing rugby at Haywards Heath RFC, his talent earning him a place in Harlequins Elite Player Development Group and then promotion to the senior Academy. He was selected to play in two senior pre-season matches in 2009 before making his first team debut later that year against Newcastle Falcons in the LV Cup. He continued developing and in January 2011 signed his first senior contract.

== Club career ==
The 2011–12 season saw Chisholm make his first Premiership start in the opener against London Irish, playing on the wing. The constant presence of Mike Brown at Fullback and stiff competition on the wings limited Chisholm's first team game time, but he did make 11 senior appearances (including 4 Premiership starts) in the season, scoring 5 tries. His last try was scored in the dying moments of an away loss against Gloucester (his second that match), it secured Quins a losing bonus point and Chisholm a nomination for RPA 'Try of the Year'.

His development has severely hampered by serious injuries which have limited his chances to play for the 1st XV.

Chisholm made a strong come back in the 2015–16 season, he scored two tries in front of 70,718 crowd at Twickenham Stadium in the Big Game 9 fixture against Gloucester.

Alongside with his playing career, Chisholm was appointed a coaching role with the Sussex Rugby in March 2017 as the side returns to the County Rugby Championship for the first time in four years.

On 26 April 2017, it was announced that Chisholm re-signed for Harlequins.
