= List of British films of 2004 =

A list of British films released in 2004:

== 2004 ==
Title	Director	Cast	Genre	Notes
9 Songs	Michael Winterbottom	Kieran O'Brien, Margo Stilley	Romantic drama	
Ae Fond Kiss...	Ken Loach	Atta Yaqub, Eva Birthistle	Drama	
Arsène Lupin	Jean-Paul Salomé	Romain Duris, Kristin Scott Thomas	Crime drama	
Around the World in 80 Days	Frank Coraci	Jackie Chan, Steve Coogan, Jim Broadbent	Adventure/comedy	Co-production with United States, Germany and Ireland
Being Julia	István Szabó	Annette Bening, Jeremy Irons	Drama	
Blind Flight	John Furse	Linus Roache, Ian Hart	Drama	
Bridget Jones: The Edge of Reason	Beeban Kidron	Renée Zellweger, Hugh Grant, Colin Firth	Comedy	
Bullet Boy	Saul Dibb	Ashley Walters, Luke Fraser	Crime drama	
Bride and Prejudice	Gurinder Chadha|	Aishwarya Rai, Martin Henderson	Romantic drama	
The Calcium Kid	Alex De Rakoff	Orlando Bloom, Michael Peña, Billie Piper	Mockumentary	
Churchill: The Hollywood Years	Peter Richardson	Christian Slater, Neve Campbell	Comedy	
Creep	Christopher Smith	Franka Potente, Ken Campbell	Horror	
Dead Man's Shoes	Shane Meadows	Paddy Considine, Gary Stretch	Crime thriller	
Dear Frankie	Shona Auerbach	Emily Mortimer, Gerard Butler	Drama	Screened at the 2004 Cannes Film Festival
Ella Enchanted	Tommy O'Haver	Anne Hathaway, Hugh Dancy	Family	Co-production with the US
Enduring Love	Roger Michell	Daniel Craig, Rhys Ifans, Samantha Morton	Romance	
Everything	Richard Hawkins	Ray Winstone, Jan Graveson	Mystery	
Finding Neverland	Marc Forster	Johnny Depp, Kate Winslet, Julie Christie	Drama	
Freak Out	Christian James	James Heathcote, Dan Palmer	Horror/comedy	
Freeze Frame	John Simpson	Lee Evans	Thriller	
George Michael: A Different Story	Southan Morris	George Michael	Documentary	First aired on BBC One
A Good Woman	Mike Barker	Helen Hunt, Scarlett Johansson	Romantic drama	Co-produced with United States, Italy and Spain.
Harry Potter and the Prisoner of Azkaban	Alfonso Cuarón	Daniel Radcliffe, Rupert Grint, Emma Watson	Fantasy	Nominated Alexander Korda Award for Best British Film at the 2005 BAFTA Awards
Head in the Clouds	John Duigan	Charlize Theron, Stuart Townsend	Romance/drama	
If Only	Gil Junger	Jennifer Love Hewitt, Paul Nicholls	Drama	
I'll Sleep When I'm Dead	Mike Hodges	Clive Owen, Jonathan Rhys Meyers, Malcolm McDowell	Crime/drama	
In My Country	John Boorman	Juliette Binoche, Samuel L. Jackson	Drama	Co-production with the Republic of Ireland and South Africa
King Arthur	Antoine Fuqua	Clive Owen, Stephen Dillane	Action	
Ladies in Lavender	Charles Dance	Judi Dench, Maggie Smith	Drama	
Layer Cake	Matthew Vaughn	Daniel Craig, Sienna Miller, Colm Meaney	Crime thriller	
The Libertine	Laurence Dunmore	Johnny Depp, Samantha Morton	Historical	
The Life and Death of Peter Sellers	Stephen Hopkins	Geoffrey Rush, Charlize Theron	Biopic	Entered into the 2004 Cannes Film Festival
Lighthouse Hill	David Fairman	Jason Flemyng, Kirsty Mitchell	Comedy/romance	
London Voodoo	Robert Pratten	Doug Cockle, Sara Stewart	Horror	
Method	Duncan Roy	Elizabeth Hurley, Jeremy Sisto	Thriller	Co-production
Mickybo and Me	Terry Loane	John Joe McNeill, Julie Walters, Ciarán Hinds	Comedy/drama	
Millions	Danny Boyle	Alex Etel, Lewis McGibbon	Family drama	
Mouth to Mouth	Alison Murray	Elliot Page, Natasha Wightman, Eric Thal	Comedy	
My Summer of Love	Paweł Pawlikowski	Natalie Press, Emily Blunt	Romance	
The Noon Gun	Anthony Stern		Documentary	
The Phantom of the Opera	Joel Schumacher	Gerard Butler, Emmy Rossum	Musical	
Piccadilly Jim	John McKay	Sam Rockwell, Frances O'Connor	Comedy	
The Queen of Sheba's Pearls	Colin Nutley	Helena Bergström, Lorcan Cranitch	Drama	Co-production with Sweden
School for Seduction	Sue Heel	Kelly Brook, Dervla Kirwan, Margi Clarke	Romance	
Sex Lives of the Potato Men	Andy Humphries	Johnny Vegas, Mackenzie Crook, Mark Gatiss	Comedy	
Shaun of the Dead	Edgar Wright	Simon Pegg, Kate Ashfield, Nick Frost	Horror/comedy	
Sky Captain and the World of Tomorrow	Kerry Conran	Gwyneth Paltrow, Jude Law	Adventure	Co-production with Italy and the US
Spivs	Colin Teague	Kate Ashfield, Ken Stott	Comedy/crime	
Stage Beauty	Richard Eyre	Billy Crudup, Claire Danes, Rupert Everett	Historical drama	
Suzie Gold	Richard Cantor	Summer Phoenix, Kevin Bishop, Gem Souleyman	Romance	
Tabloid	David Blair	Matthew Rhys, Mary Elizabeth Mastrantonio	Comedy	
Things to Do Before You're 30	Simon Shore	Dougray Scott, Emilia Fox, Billie Piper	Drama	
Trauma	Marc Evans	Colin Firth, Mena Suvari, Naomie Harris	Thriller	
Troy	Wolfgang Petersen	Brad Pitt, Orlando Bloom	Action	Co-production with the US and Malta
Vanity Fair	Mira Nair	Reese Witherspoon, Romola Garai, James Purefoy	Drama	
Vera Drake	Mike Leigh	Imelda Staunton, Phil Davis, Eddie Marsan	Drama	Winner of the Golden Lion and Best Actress prizes at the Venice Film Festival
A Way of Life	Amma Asante	Brenda Blethyn, Stephanie James	Drama	
Wimbledon	Richard Loncraine	Kirsten Dunst, Paul Bettany	Sports	
Winner Takes All	Helen M. Grace	JC Mac, Chico Slimani	Short film	
Yasmin	Kenneth Glenaan	Archie Panjabi	Drama	

== See also ==
- 2004 in film
- 2004 in British music
- 2004 in British radio
- 2004 in British television
- 2004 in the United Kingdom
- List of 2004 box office number-one films in the United Kingdom
