= 2004 in British music =

This article gives details on 2004 in music in the United Kingdom.

== Summary ==
Michelle McManus, the winner of the second British series of Pop Idol, enjoyed success with her first single release, which topped the charts. Second and third place contestants Mark Rhodes and Sam Nixon formed a duo, whose debut single was a cover of "With a Little Help from My Friends", which also reached No.1. On 9 March Westlife became a four-piece after Brian McFadden decided to leave the band.

Numerous acts released greatest hits albums, with Robbie Williams' being most successful, selling over one million copies in eight weeks. Popular artists from the 1980s made successful returns, including Duran Duran, The Cure, Depeche Mode and Morrissey, all of whom released top ten singles. After appearing in the reality television show I'm a Celebrity, Get Me Out of Here!, Peter Andre re-released his 1996 hit single Mysterious Girl, this time getting to the top spot. Twenty years after the original, the Band Aid single Do They Know It's Christmas? was re-recorded and was the best-selling single of the year, holding the Christmas number 1 spot. The song sold over a million copies in a month.

The most successful British pop acts of 2004 were McFly whose first two debut singles entered at number one, and Natasha Bedingfield, who topped the singles, album and download charts. The 2004 Children in Need single was "I'll Stand by You". Former S Club star Rachel Stevens continued with her solo career, reaching the top 3 with the Sport Relief track "Some Girls".

In the classical world, Karl Jenkins continued success as a composer was rewarded by a 10-year recording deal with EMI. His choral work, In These Stones Horizons Sing, was commissioned for the opening of the Wales Millennium Centre in November 2004. Newly appointed Master of the Queen's Music Sir Peter Maxwell Davies continued his series of Naxos Quartets with nos. 4 and 5. Veteran composer Harrison Birtwistle produced a new opera, The Io Passion, which had its première in June at Snape Maltings as part of the Aldeburgh Festival.

== Events ==
- 5 January – Lesley Douglas succeeds James Moir as Controller of BBC Radio 2 and BBC 6 Music.
- 13 February – Elton John begins The Red Piano concert residency at The Colosseum at Caesars Palace in Las Vegas. Originally scheduled for 75 performances, it will run for 248 shows over five years, including twenty-four tour dates in Europe.
- 17 February – BRIT Awards held in London. The Darkness, Dido, Busted, and Duran Duran are among the winners.
- 1 March – Johnnie Walker returns to his Radio 2 drivetime show following a nine-month break while he received treatment for cancer.
- 10 March – George Michael announces that Patience will be his last commercially released record. Future releases will be available from his web site in return for donations to his favourite charities.
- 13 March – Charles Ngandwe, performing as Paul Robeson, wins the fifteenth series of TV talent show Stars in Their Eyes. The edition is also the last to be presented by Matthew Kelly, who had announced the previous day that he would be leaving the series.
- 23 May – 30 years after his death, Nick Drake enters the top 40 for the first time, with "Magic"; it reaches No.32 on the Official Singles Chart.
- 4 June – Karl Jenkins signs a 10-year recording deal with EMI.
- 23 June – DJ Tony Blackburn is suspended by radio station Classic Gold Digital for playing songs by Cliff Richard, against station policy.
- 25 June – Eric Clapton sells his famous guitar "Blackie" at a Christie's auction, raising $959,000 to benefit the Crossroads drug rehabilitation centre that he founded in 1998.
- 30 June – The Libertines perform without Pete Doherty and refuse to let him rejoin the band due to his continuing drug problems.
- 3 July – BBC newsreader Natasha Kaplinsky and her dance partner Brendan Cole win the first series of Strictly Come Dancing.
- 10 July – Ex-S Club star Rachel Stevens sets a world record for completing the fastest promotional circuit in just 24 hours- including a run for the charity Sport Relief.
- 12 November – Over a thousand people attend the funeral of John Peel (who died suddenly on 25 October aged 65 from a heart attack on a working holiday in Cusco, Peru) at St Edmundsbury Cathedral in Bury St Edmunds, Suffolk, including many of the artists he championed. Eulogies are read by his brother, Alan Ravenscroft, and DJ Paul Gambaccini. The service ends with clips of him talking about his life and his coffin is carried out to the accompaniment of his favourite song, the Undertones' "Teenage Kicks". At Peel's request, his gravestone at Great Finborough contains the words, "Teenage dreams, so hard to beat", from the lyrics of "Teenage Kicks".
- 29 November – The BBC announces that Top of the Pops will move from its Friday evening BBC One slot to BBC Two, where it will be shown on Sunday evenings.
- 11 December – Steve Brookstein is named winner of the first series of The X Factor. G4 are named the runner-ups, while Tabby Callaghan and Rowetta Satchell finish in third and fourth place respectively.
- 17 December – The Libertines perform what would be their final concert for over 5 years in Paris, without Pete Doherty. Carl Barat then announces the split of The Libertines. They would reform in 2010.@SOUTHAMPTON guildhall. The Music performed live on the 25/9/2004

== Bands formed ==
- August – The Unthanks
- Architects
- Bring Me the Horizon

== Bands on hiatus ==
- Blur

== Bands disbanded ==
- The Beta Band
- The Libertines (until a 2010 reunion)

== Television series ==
- Howard Goodall's 20th Century Greats
- The Genius of Mozart, presented by Charles Hazlewood

== Classical works ==
- Julian Anderson – Symphony
- Harrison Birtwistle – Today Too, for tenor, flute and guitar
- Richard Causton – Between Two Waves of the Sea (for orchestra and tape/sampler)
- Alun Hoddinott – Trombone Concerto
- Cameron Sinclair – The Secret of the Universe

== Opera ==
- Thomas Adès – The Tempest (libretto by Meredith Oakes)
- Matthew King – On London Fields (libretto by Alasdair Middleton)

== Musical films ==
- The Phantom of the Opera, directed by Joel Schumacher and starring Gerard Butler

== Film scores ==
- Nick Glennie-Smith – Ella Enchanted
- Nigel Hess – Ladies in Lavender
- Michael Nyman – The Libertine
- Debbie Wiseman – Arsène Lupin

== Deaths ==
- 3 January – Ronald Smith, 82, pianist
- 12 February – Tushar Makwana, 37, DJ (hit-and-run car accident)
- 13 February – Peter Gellhorn, 91, pianist and conductor
- 23 February – Neil Ardley, 66, jazz pianist and composer
- 4 March – John McGeoch, 48, guitarist with Magazine, Siouxsie and the Banshees and PiL
- 6 March – Max Harris, 85, film and TV composer and arranger
- 9 March – Tony Lee, jazz pianist
- 13 March – Sydney Carter, 89, hymn writer (Lord of the Dance)
- 1 April – Paul Atkinson, 58, guitarist and producer
- 9 April – S. Drummond Wolff, 88, organist, choirmaster and composer
- 9 May – Percy M. Young, 91, musicologist, editor, organist, composer, conductor and teacher
- 27 May – Denis ApIvor, 88, modernist composer
- 5 June – Iona Brown, 63, violinist and conductor
- 26 June – Muriel Angelus, 95, singer and actress
- 15 July – Ena Baga, 98, pianist and theatre organist
- 31 August – Carl Wayne, 61, vocalist (The Move)
- 9 September – John Buller, 77, composer
- 19 September – Kenneth Sandford, 80, operatic baritone
- 25 October – John Peel, 65, British DJ and broadcaster (heart attack)
- 13 November – John Balance, 42, experimental musician and lyricist (Coil)
- 1 December – Norman Newell, 85, record producer and lyricist
- 2 December – Alicia Markova, 94, ballerina
- 14 December – Sidonie Goossens, 105, harpist
- 21 December – James Clifford Brown, 81, singer, organist and composer
- 23 December
  - John W. Duarte, 85, composer
  - Ifor James, 73, horn player and teacher

== Music awards ==
=== BRIT Awards ===
The 2004 BRIT Awards winners were:

- Best British Male Solo Artist: Daniel Bedingfield
- Best British Female Solo Artist: Dido
- Best British Group: The Darkness
- British Breakthrough: Busted
- Best British Single: Dido – "White Flag"
- Best British Album: The Darkness – "Permission to Land"
- Best British Dance Act: Basement Jaxx
- Best Pop Act: Busted
- Best British Urban Act: Lemar
- Best British Rock Act: The Darkness
- Best International Female Solo Artist: Beyoncé
- Best International Male Solo Artist: Justin Timberlake
- Best International Group: The White Stripes
- International Breakthrough Artist: 50 Cent
- Best International Album: Justin Timberlake – "Justified"
- Outstanding Contribution: Duran Duran

=== Mercury Music Prize ===
The 2004 Mercury Music Prize was awarded to Franz Ferdinand – Franz Ferdinand

=== Popjustice £20 Music Prize ===
The 2004 Popjustice £20 Music Prize was awarded to Rachel Stevens for her song Some Girls from the album Funky Dory.

=== The Record of the Year ===
The Record of the Year was awarded to "Thunderbirds" by Busted.

== See also ==
- 2004 in British music charts
- 2004 in British radio
- 2004 in British television
- 2004 in the United Kingdom
- List of British films of 2004
