= 2004 in the United Kingdom =

Events from the year 2004 in the United Kingdom.

== Incumbents ==
- Monarch – Elizabeth II
- Prime Minister – Tony Blair (Labour)

== Events ==
=== January ===
- 1 January – Papers released under the Thirty-year rule reveal that, contrary to what was believed at the time, Princess Margaret would not have lost her title nor Civil list payments had she married Group Captain Peter Townsend, a divorced War hero, in the 1950s.
- 3 January – The BBC cancels the appearance of Coca-Cola sponsorship credits in the music charts on its BBC One Top of the Pops show, after criticism from politicians and health campaigners that it would be promoting junk food and unhealthy drink products to teenagers.
- 6 January
  - The coroner's inquest into the death of Diana, Princess of Wales and her lover Dodi Al-Fayed is officially opened.
  - The Daily Mirror publishes the blacked out portion of a letter wherein Diana, Princess of Wales alleged that someone was trying to kill her.
- 7 January – It is announced that a record of nearly 2,600,000 new cars were sold in the United Kingdom during 2003.
- 8 January – RMS Queen Mary 2 is christened by Elizabeth II.
- 13 January
  - Labour politician Robin Cook says that the British Museum's Parthenon Marbles should be returned to Greece.
  - Serial killer Dr. Harold Shipman is found dead in his cell one day prior to his fifty-eighth birthday following his suicide by hanging.
  - The Bichard Inquiry into events preceding the Soham murders formally opens.
- 14 January – A 45-year-old Sudanese man travelling from Washington Dulles International Airport to Dubai Airport is arrested en route at London's Heathrow Airport on suspicion of carrying five bullets in his coat pocket.
- 19 January – The English Court of Appeal calls for an end to the prosecution of parents whose babies may have died of Sudden Infant Death Syndrome (cot death) in cases where the only evidence is contended expert testimony.
- 21 January – The Secretary of State for Defence publishes a White paper Delivering Security in a Changing World, detailing wide-ranging reform of the country's armed forces.
- 27 January – The vote of Scottish Labour MPs, whose constituents are unaffected by the legislation, help Prime Minister Tony Blair narrowly defeat a rebellion in his own party over the Higher Education Bill – a highly controversial bill to reform higher education funding in England, including the introduction of increased and variable tuition fees – in the House of Commons by 316 votes to 311.
- 28 January – The Hutton Inquiry into the circumstances of the death of Dr. David Kelly is published. This is taken by most of the press to be a strong condemnation of the BBC's handling of the affair and to exonerate the government; the BBC's Director-General, Greg Dyke, chairman of the Board of Governors, Gavyn Davies, and the journalist at the centre of the controversy, Andrew Gilligan, resign. The UK media, in general, condemns the report as a whitewash.

=== February ===
- 1 February – Media sources and victim support groups across Britain condemn the £11,000 payouts to the families of the two girls who were murdered at Soham in August 2002 as a "pittance". The compensation was paid out by the Criminal Injuries Compensation Authority.
- 3 February – Foreign Secretary Jack Straw announces an independent inquiry, to be chaired by Lord Butler, to examine the reliability of intelligence on weapons of mass destruction in Iraq.
- 5–6 February – A party of Chinese cockle pickers is caught by the tides at night in Morecambe Bay, Lancashire, drowning 23 people. 21 bodies are recovered.
- 11 February – Richard Desmond, the owner of the Daily Express and Daily Star tabloids, confirms that he has made a bid for the troubled broadsheet The Daily Telegraph.
- 15 February
  - The government are reported to have drawn up plans to break up the BBC in the wake of the Hutton inquiry.
  - Tebay rail accident: four railway workers are killed and five injured on the West Coast Main Line in Cumbria when a goods wagon carrying steel breaks loose from its train and runs backwards.
- 19 February – Foreign Secretary Jack Straw announces that five of the nine Britons held without trial as terror suspects at the Guantanamo Bay prison camp in Cuba, along with a Danish national, are to be released.
- 21 February – Prime Minister Tony Blair comes under pressure from British human rights groups and MPs because of the government's sweeping powers under the Anti-Terrorism Crime and Security Act, which have allowed the detention of fourteen foreign terrorist suspects in the UK at what has been described as "Britain's Guantanamo Bay".
- 24 February – The British Olympic Association prohibits European 100 metres champion Dwain Chambers from competing in the Olympic Games for life for a positive test for the designer steroid THG.
- 25 February – Katharine Gun, formerly an employee of British spy agency GCHQ, has a charge of breaching the Official Secrets Act dropped after prosecutors offer no evidence, apparently on the advice of the Attorney General for England and Wales. Gun has admitted leaking American plans to bug UN delegates to a newspaper.
- 26 February – Clare Short, former Cabinet Minister, alleges on the BBC Today radio programme that British spies regularly intercept UN communications, including those of Kofi Annan, the UN Secretary-General.
- 29 February – Middlesbrough F.C. win their first trophy in their 128-year history by defeating Bolton Wanderers F.C. in the Football League Cup Final.

=== March ===
- March – Vauxhall launches the fifth generation of its popular Astra family hatchback. It is initially available only as a five-door hatchback, with a three-door "Sporthatch" and a five-door estate due later in the year.
- 11 March – Support for the Conservatives and Labour is equal at 35% for the second time in nine months, raising the spectre of a hung parliament at the next general election which is expected within a year.
- 16 March – 15-year-old Scottish boy Kriss Donald is abducted, tortured and murdered by a Pakistani gang in a racially motivated attack in Glasgow.
- 21 March – Architect Zaha Hadid becomes the first female recipient of the Pritzker Prize.
- 28 March – The actor, author, diplomat and Chancellor of Durham University, Peter Ustinov, dies of heart failure aged 82 at a hospital in Switzerland.
- 30 March
  - Operation Crevice, the arrest of a group of British Islamists, 5 of whom are subsequently convicted of conspiring to cause explosions likely to endanger life.
  - The English-born American journalist Alistair Cooke dies of lung cancer at his home in New York City aged 95, only four weeks after his last broadcast of Letter from America.

=== April ===
- 19 April – In a change of government policy, Tony Blair announces there will be a referendum on the proposed EU Constitution.
- 28 April – Landmark office building 30 St Mary Axe ("The Gherkin") in the City of London, designed by Norman Foster, opens.

=== May ===
- 7 May – BBC Two airs The Simpsons for the final time with "Behind the Laughter" being the final episode, having lost terrestrial rights to air the show to Channel 4.
- 10 May – Maxine Carr is released from prison with a new identity after serving half of her sentence for perverting the course of justice in the 2002 Soham murders case, as announced on 6 February by the Home Office.
- 11 May – Stockline Plastics factory explosion: Nine people die in an explosion at a factory in Glasgow.
- 14 May – Piers Morgan is dismissed as editor of the Daily Mirror after the newspaper published fake pictures of Iraqi prisoner abuse.
- 15 May – Arsenal F.C. become the first team in history to win a Premier League undefeated. They are also the first to win a top flight title unbeaten since Preston North End in 1889.
- 19 May – Fathers 4 Justice stage a protest in the House of Commons at Prime Minister's Questions by throwing purple powder at Tony Blair.
- 22 May – Manchester United F.C. beat Millwall 3–0 in the FA Cup final.
- 27 May – The MP for Leicester South, Jim Marshall, dies triggering a by-election.
- 31 May – Long-running children's animated television series Peppa Pig premieres on the Nick Jr. Channel and Five.

=== June ===
- 2 June – José Mourinho, the Portuguese coach who led FC Porto to the UEFA Champions League title on 26 May, is named as the new manager of Chelsea F.C. on a three-year contract.
- 6 June – Sixtieth anniversary of D-Day. Last minute pressure forces First Minister of Scotland Jack McConnell to attend commemorations. Rhodri Morgan, the First Minister of Wales is criticised for not doing the same.
- 10 June
  - A bumper election day takes place, dubbed "Super Thursday":
    - 2004 United Kingdom local elections: Labour are dealt with significant blows, with a net loss of 464 councillors and 8 councils; while the Conservatives make a net gain of 13 councils and 288 councillors. There are mixed results for the Liberal Democrats as their vote share is down 3% and they lose 2 councils, but gain 123 councillors.
    - 2004 European Parliament election: UKIP make big gains, gaining 10 seats bringing their total up to 12, indicating an increase in Euroscepticism; while both Labour and the Conservatives perform poorly, losing 6 and 8 seats respectively.
    - 2004 London mayoral election: Ken Livingstone is re-elected as Mayor of London, beating Conservative rival Steven Norris in the second round of voting, albeit with a slightly reduced majority.
    - 2004 London Assembly election: Labour and the Greens make losses, both the Liberal Democrats and UKIP make gains, while the Conservatives remain almost exactly level with the previous result.
  - A rebranding of the Football League sees Division One become the Football League Championship, Division Two become League One and Division Three become League Two.
- 14 June – Results of the 2004 European elections are announced. UK Independence Party (UKIP) are the main gainers, increasing from 3 to 12 MEPs.
- 16 June – Liverpool F.C. appoint the Spaniard Rafael Benítez as their new manager.
- 21 June – The Football League club Wimbledon, who relocated to Milton Keynes from South London last autumn, are renamed Milton Keynes Dons to reflect their new location.
- 24 June – England are knocked out of UEFA Euro 2004 in the quarter-finals by host nation Portugal on penalties, following a 2–2 draw after extra time in Lisbon.
- 29 June – Islamic terrorist Kamel Bourgass, an illegal immigrant from Algeria, is convicted of the 2003 murder of Stephen Oake and the attempted murder of two other police officers. The crimes occurred in Manchester, with Oake stabbed eight times.

=== July ===
- 2 July
  - An openly gay cleric, Jeffrey John, is installed as the Dean of St Albans.
  - A court rules that Humberside Police Authority must suspend the Chief Constable, David Westwood, in accordance with the Home Secretary (David Blunkett)'s demands.
  - Premier Travel Inn (shortened to Premier Inn in 2007) is formed by merger of the Travel Inn and Premier Lodge brands.
- 6 July – The Queen unveils the Diana, Princess of Wales Memorial Fountain in London's Hyde Park.
- 8 July – Marks & Spencer turn down a takeover bid by retail tycoon Philip Green.
- 12 July – Chancellor of the Exchequer Gordon Brown announces the massive loss of 100,000 civil service jobs in the UK; the savings to be put into frontline services such as Health and Education.
- 13 July
  - The Public Administration Committee of the House of Commons recommends massive changes to the British Honours System including scrapping knighthoods and renaming the Order of the British Empire to the "Order of British Excellence".
  - The Countryside Agency publicises a new Countryside Code in advance of the "Right to Roam" coming into effect in September across England and Wales.
  - The House of Lords makes a hostile amendment to the Constitutional Reform Bill that would retain the name of the office of Lord Chancellor.
- 14 July – The Butler Inquiry releases its report, mildly criticising the government in their use of intelligence relating to Weapons of Mass Destruction in Iraq.
- 15 July
  - 2004 Leicester South by-election: Parmjit Singh Gill of the Liberal Democrats gains the seat, overturning a Labour majority of 13,243.
  - 2004 Birmingham Hodge Hill by-election: Liam Byrne narrowly holds the seat for Labour, just 460 votes ahead of the Liberal Democrats's Nicola Davies. Labour's majority was 13,243 at the 2001 general election.
- 18 July – North Yorkshire police launch a murder hunt after 27-year-old twin sisters Claire and Diane Sanderson are found dead in a flat in Camblesforth, near Selby.
- 19 July – The government announces backing for the Crossrail project in London.
- 20 July – The government publishes the results of a review into Council Tax in England.
- 23 July – Tony Blair announces that Peter Mandelson is to become Britain's new European Commissioner.

=== August ===
- 1 August – The University of Surrey Roehampton becomes Roehampton University.
- 9 August
  - West Bromwich Albion F.C. terminate the contract of striker Lee Hughes as he is sentenced to six years in prison after being found guilty of causing death by dangerous driving, having killed a 56-year-old man in a collision near Coventry on 22 November 2003.
  - Home Office Circular 46/2004 is issued giving guidance concerning the review of police injury pensions.
- 12 August – Police are investigating whether a couple, John and Joan Stirland, were victims of a revenge killing. Both were found shot dead at their home in Trusthorpe, Lincolnshire on 8 August, having fled their home in Nottingham after Mrs Stirland's son was convicted of a gangland murder.
- 13–29 August – Great Britain participates in the 2004 Summer Olympics in Athens winning a total of 9 gold, 9 silver and 12 bronze medals.
- 16 August – Boscastle flood of 2004: flash floods destroy buildings and wash cars out to sea in Cornwall.
- 28 August – Runner Kelly Holmes wins her second gold medal at the 2004 Summer Olympics.

=== September ===
- 13 September – A Fathers 4 Justice campaigner dressed as Batman breaches security at Buckingham Palace.
- 15 September – Parliament is suspended after pro-hunt campaigners break into the House of Commons.

=== October ===
- 1 October – Tony Blair confirms he will seek a third term as Prime Minister, but rules out a possible fourth term, meaning if Labour win the next general election, he will resign before the next election after that.
- 2 October – The first parkrun, known at this time as Bushy Park Time Trial, takes place in Bushy Park, London.
- 7 October – British hostage Ken Bigley of Liverpool, is beheaded by militants in Iraq.
- 9 October – Scottish Parliament Building in Edinburgh, designed by Enric Miralles, is opened.
- 19 October – Kidnapping and killing of Margaret Hassan: Irish-British Baghdad-resident aid worker Margaret Hassan is taken hostage in Iraq. On or about 8 November she is shot dead (on 16 November it is reported that her family have received a video recording supposedly showing her being killed).
- 24 October – Arsenal F.C.'s 49-league game unbeaten run, the longest in the history of English football, comes to an end following a 2-0 defeat away to Manchester United.
- 26 October – Selby Coalfield production ceases.
- 28 October – Companies (Audit, Investigations and Community Enterprise) Act 2004 regulates company auditing and financial record keeping and introduces the community interest company.
- 29 October – Princess Alice, Duchess of Gloucester dies at Kensington Palace aged 102, making her the oldest British royal in history.

=== November ===
- 4 November – 2004 North East England devolution referendum: Voters resoundingly reject proposals to establish an elected assembly for the region, 77.93% to 22.07%, causing the government to abandon similar referendums in other areas.
- 5 November
  - The funeral of Princess Alice takes place at St George's Chapel, Windsor Castle.
  - Philanthropist Anthony Ashley-Cooper, 10th Earl of Shaftesbury, 66, goes missing while on holiday in Nice, France. His body is discovered in 2005 and he is determined to have been murdered by his brother-in-law with the connivance of his estranged wife.
- 6 November – Ufton Nervet rail crash: Seven people are killed when a train is derailed by a car deliberately left on a level crossing in Berkshire.
- 15 November – Children Act clarifies most official responsibilities for children, notably bringing all local government functions for children's welfare and education under the authority of local Directors of Children's Services.
- 16 November – The government announces plans to prohibit smoking in most enclosed public places (including workplaces) within the next three years.
- 18 November – Parliament passes the Hunting Act 2004 prohibiting fox hunting in England and Wales; the Civil Partnership Act, granting civil partnerships for same-sex couples from 2005; and the Civil Contingencies Act, providing for local arrangements for civil protection and national emergency powers.
- 20 November – Launch of the Swift Gamma-Ray Burst Mission, a joint United States, UK and Italian-developed spacecraft, designed to study gamma-ray bursts.
- 28 November – Wales Millennium Centre in Cardiff is opened.

=== December ===
- December – Ford launches the second generation of its best-selling Focus family car that was originally launched in September 1998.
- 2 December – David Bieber, a 38-year-old former United States marine, is found guilty of murdering PC Ian Broadhurst in Leeds on Boxing Day last year. He is sentenced to life imprisonment, and the trial judge recommends that he should never be released from prison. After his conviction, it is revealed that Bieber was wanted in connection with a 1995 murder in Florida. It is also revealed that he had entered the UK by using the alias Nathan Wayne Coleman – who was discovered to be a child that had died in infancy in 1968.
- 14 December –
  - Nick Griffin, chairman of the British National Party (BNP), is arrested at his home in Wales on suspicion of incitement to racial hatred, over remarks he made about Islam in an undercover BBC documentary titled The Secret Agent. He is questioned at a police station in Halifax, West Yorkshire, before being freed on police bail. He says that the arrest is "an electoral scam to get the Muslim block vote back to the Labour party" and that the Labour government was attempting to influence the results of the following year's general election.
  - Millau Viaduct in France, designed by British architect Norman Foster, is opened.
- 15 December – David Blunkett resigns as Home Secretary after three-and-a-half years in the role.
- 20 December – Northern Bank robbery: A gang of thieves steal £26.5 million worth of currency from Northern Bank's Donegall Square West headquarters in Belfast, one of the largest bank robberies in British history; no-one is ever found directly responsible for the crime.
- 26 December
  - 150 British people are among thousands of people killed by the devastating 2004 Indian Ocean tsunami in across the South and Southeast Asia during a Christmas holiday and Boxing Day celebration.
  - The Queen's cousin-in-law, businessman Sir Angus Ogilvy, dies of cancer aged 76 in hospital at Kingston upon Thames, London.

=== Full date unknown ===
- Forces Children's Trust British charity is established.

== Publications ==
- Iain M. Banks' novel The Algebraist.
- Louis de Bernières' novel Birds Without Wings.
- Susanna Clarke's novel Jonathan Strange & Mr Norrell.
- Alan Hollinghurst's novel The Line of Beauty.
- Andrea Levy's novel Small Island.
- David Mitchell's novel Cloud Atlas.
- Terry Pratchett's Discworld novels A Hat Full of Sky and Going Postal.
- The Liberal Democrat tract The Orange Book: Reclaiming Liberalism edited by Paul Marshall and David Laws.

== Births ==
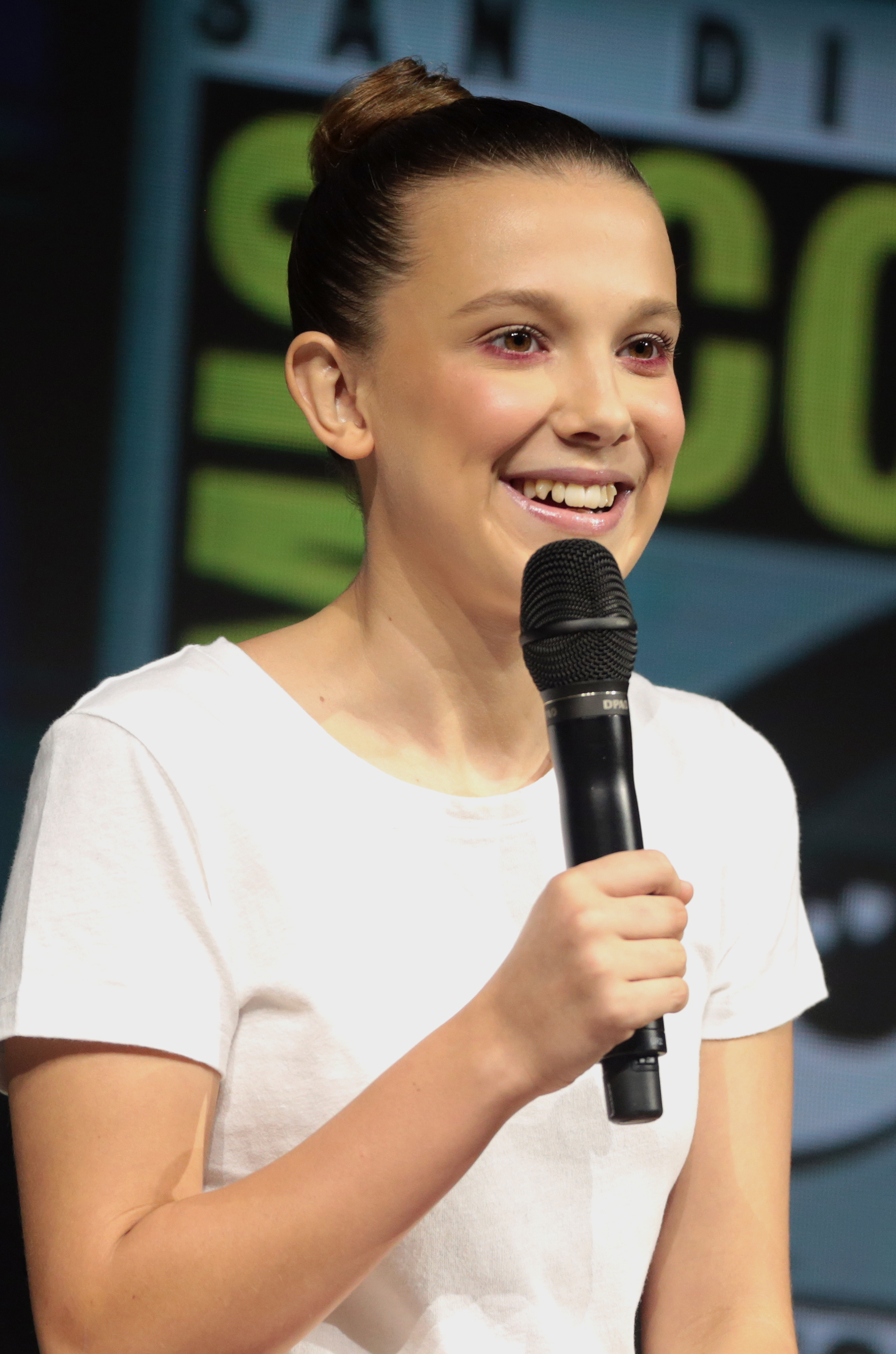
Millie Bobby Brown

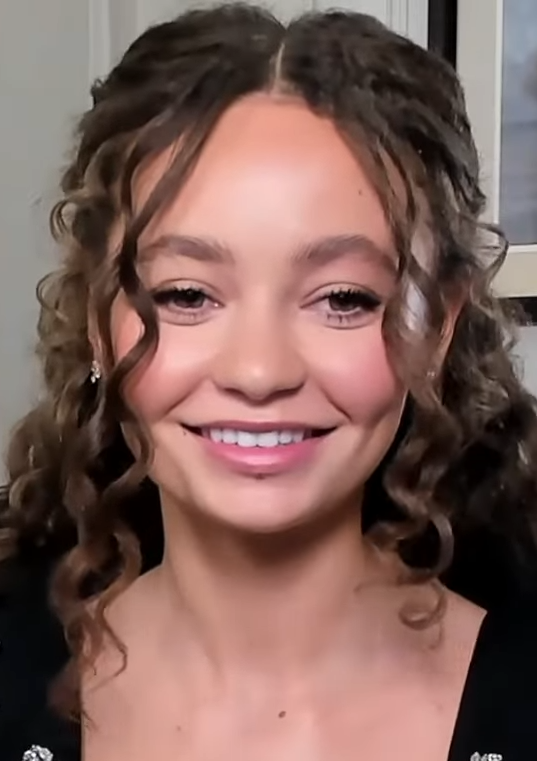
Nico Parker

- 11 January – James Rew, English cricketer
- 2 February – Shola Shoretire, English footballer
- 8 February – Hannah Moncur, Scottish actress
- 19 February – Millie Bobby Brown, actress and model
- 8 March – Kit Connor, actor
- 9 April – TommyInnit, internet personality
- 19 June – Millie Gibson, English actress
- 2 July – Jordan James, Welsh footballer
- 2 September – Desharne Bent-Ashmeil, British diver
- 25 September – Prince Odysseas-Kimon of Greece and Denmark
- 1 October – Jimi Gower, Malaysian footballer
- 9 November – Mohammad Sahil Saeed, kidnap victim
- 21 November
  - Jack Henderson, Scottish graphic artist and charity fundraiser
  - Rico Lewis, footballer
- 9 December – Nico Parker, actress
- 21 December – Estella Taylor, daughter of Lady Helen Taylor

== Deaths ==
=== January ===
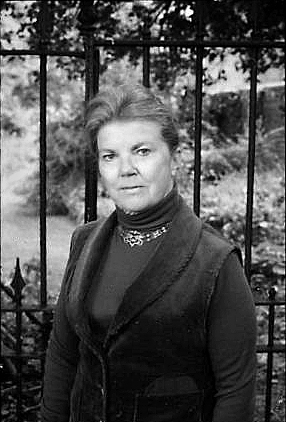
Joan Aiken

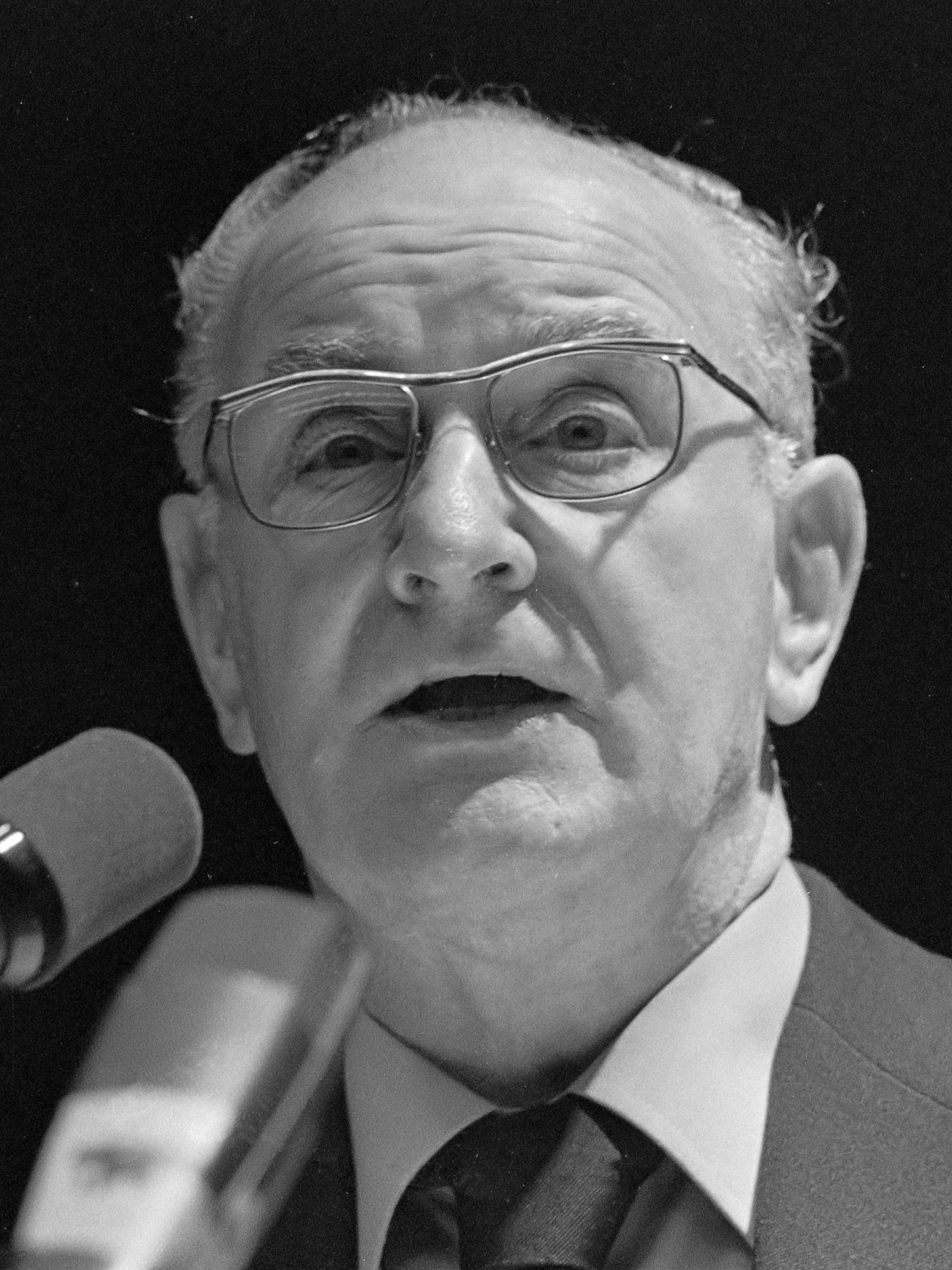
Hugh Scanlon

- 3 January – Lillian Beckwith, writer (born 1916)
- 4 January
  - Joan Aiken, writer (born 1924)
  - Brian Gibson, film director (born 1944)
  - Jeff Nuttall, actor, poet, and painter (born 1933)
- 5 January – Norman Heatley, biologist and biochemist (born 1911)
- 6 January
  - John Evans, footballer (born 1929)
  - Reg Smith, football player and manager (born 1912)
- 10 January – Sir Henry Leask, general (born 1913)
- 11 January – Mervyn Pike, Baroness Pike, politician (born 1918)
- 13 January
  - Tom Hurndall, political activist (murdered) (born 1981)
  - Harold Shipman, serial killer (suicide) (born 1946)
- 21 January
  - Kenneth Hubbard, RAF pilot (born 1920)
  - John T. Lewis, Welsh physicist (born 1932)
- 26 January
  - Wilhelmina Barns-Graham, artist (born 1912)
  - Hugh Jenkins, Baron Jenkins of Putney, politician (born 1908)
- 27 January
  - Rikki Fulton, comedian and actor (born 1924)
  - Hugh Scanlon, trade union leader (born 1913)
- 29 January
  - A. A. Englander, television cinematographer (born 1916)
  - M. M. Kaye, writer (born 1908)
  - James Saunders, playwright (born 1925)
- 30 January – George Bennions, Battle of Britain Spitfire pilot (born 1913)

=== February ===
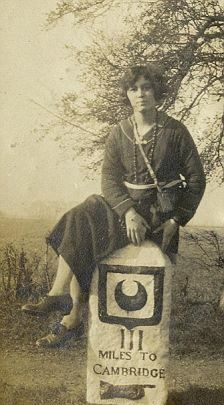
Frances Partridge

- 1 February –
  - Ally MacLeod, former manager of the Scotland national football team (born 1931)
  - Bob Stokoe, former footballer and football manager (born 1930)
- 2 February – Alan Bullock, Baron Bullock, historian (born 1914)
- 4 February – William MacQuitty, film producer (born 1905)
- 5 February
  - Nicholas Evans, artist (born 1907)
  - Frances Partridge, writer and last surviving member of the Bloomsbury Group (born 1900)
- 6 February – Humphry Osmond, psychiatrist (born 1917)
- 7 February – Norman Thelwell, cartoonist (born 1923)
- 12 February – Martin Booth, poet (born 1944)
- 13 February – Peter Gellhorn, pianist and conductor (born 1912)
- 18 February – Ivor Stanbrook, politician and barrister (born 1924)
- 20 February
  - Fred Brown, virologist (born 1925)
  - Ted Paige, physicist (born 1930)
- 22 February – Colin Eaborn, molecular biologist (born 1923)
- 23 February – Neil Ardley, jazz composer (born 1937)

=== March ===
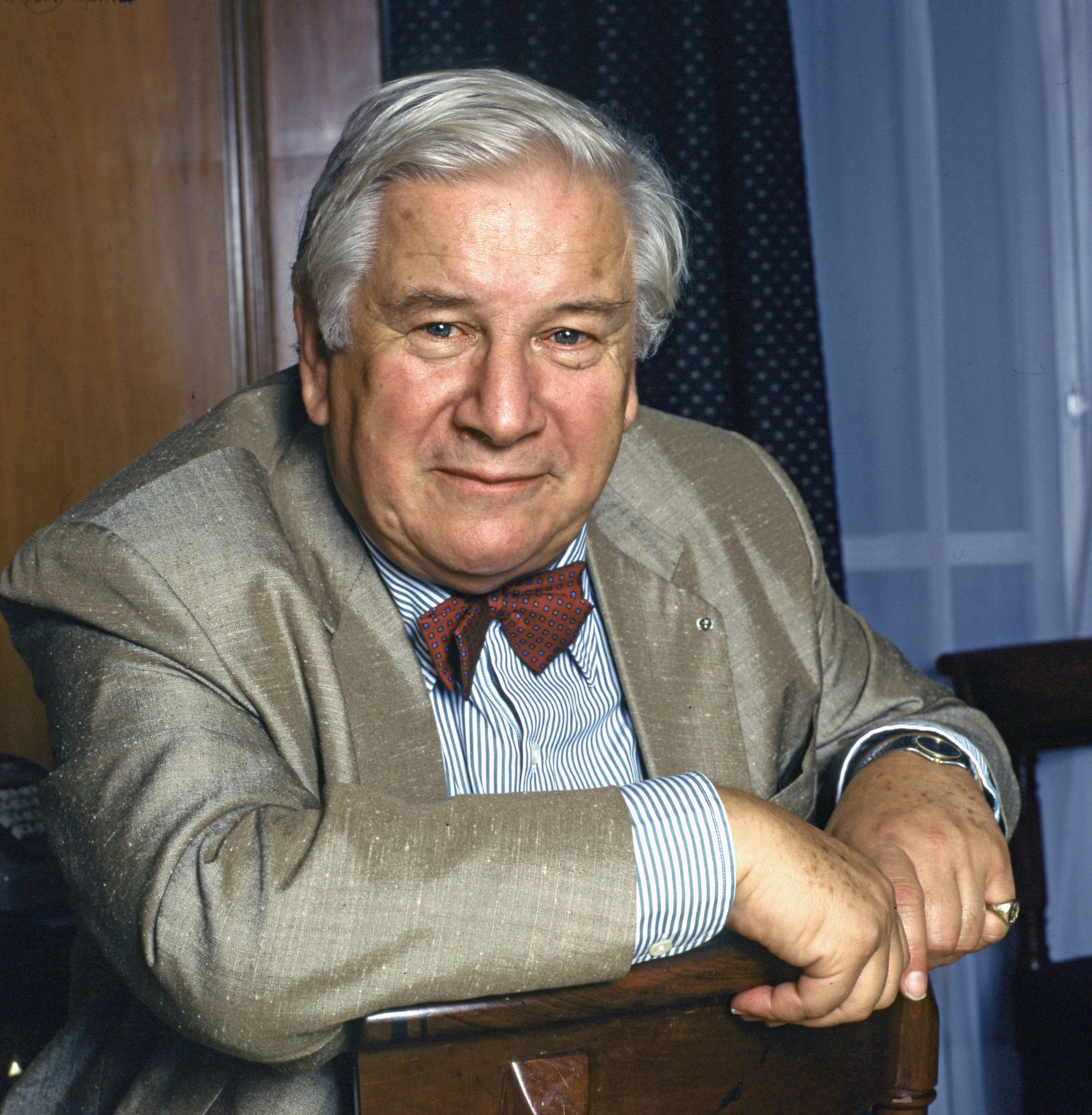
Peter Ustinov

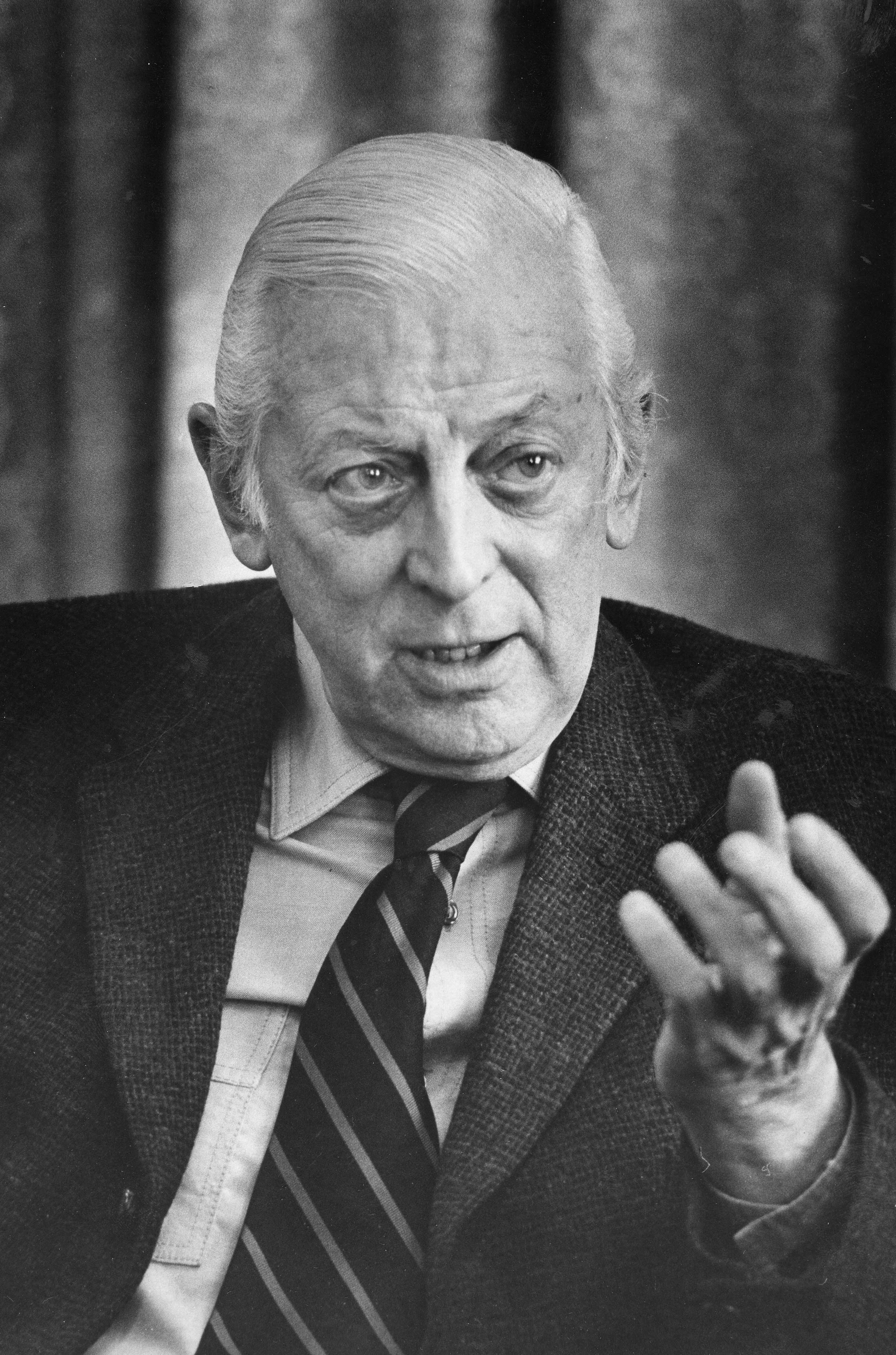
Alistair Cooke

- 4 March
  - John McGeoch, rock guitarist (born 1955)
  - Sir Malcolm Pasley, literary scholar (born 1926)
- 6 March – Sandy Glen, explorer (born 1912)
- 8 March
  - Keith Hopkins, sociologist and historian (born 1934)
  - Robin Hunter, actor (born 1929)
- 9 March – Tony Lee, jazz pianist (born 1934)
- 10 March – David Shoenberg, physicist (born 1911, Russian Empire)
- 13 March – Sydney Carter, poet and songwriter (born 1915)
- 15 March – John Pople, chemist, Nobel Prize laureate (born 1925)
- 18 March – Richard Marner, actor (born 1921, Soviet Union)
- 19 March – Ted Walker, poet and dramatist (born 1934)
- 22 March – David Oates, archaeologist (born 1927)
- 27 March
  - Lionel Sackville-West, 6th Baron Sackville, peer and stockbroker (born 1914)
  - Larry Trask, professor of linguistics (born 1944, United States)
- 28 March – Sir Peter Ustinov, actor, writer, dramatist and raconteur (born 1921)
- 30 March
  - Alistair Cooke, broadcaster and writer (Letter from America) (born 1908)
  - Hubert Gregg, actor and broadcaster (born 1914)
- 31 March – John Paul, colonial administrator (born 1916)

=== April ===
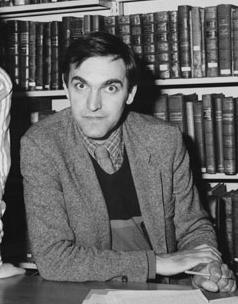
Ben Pimlott

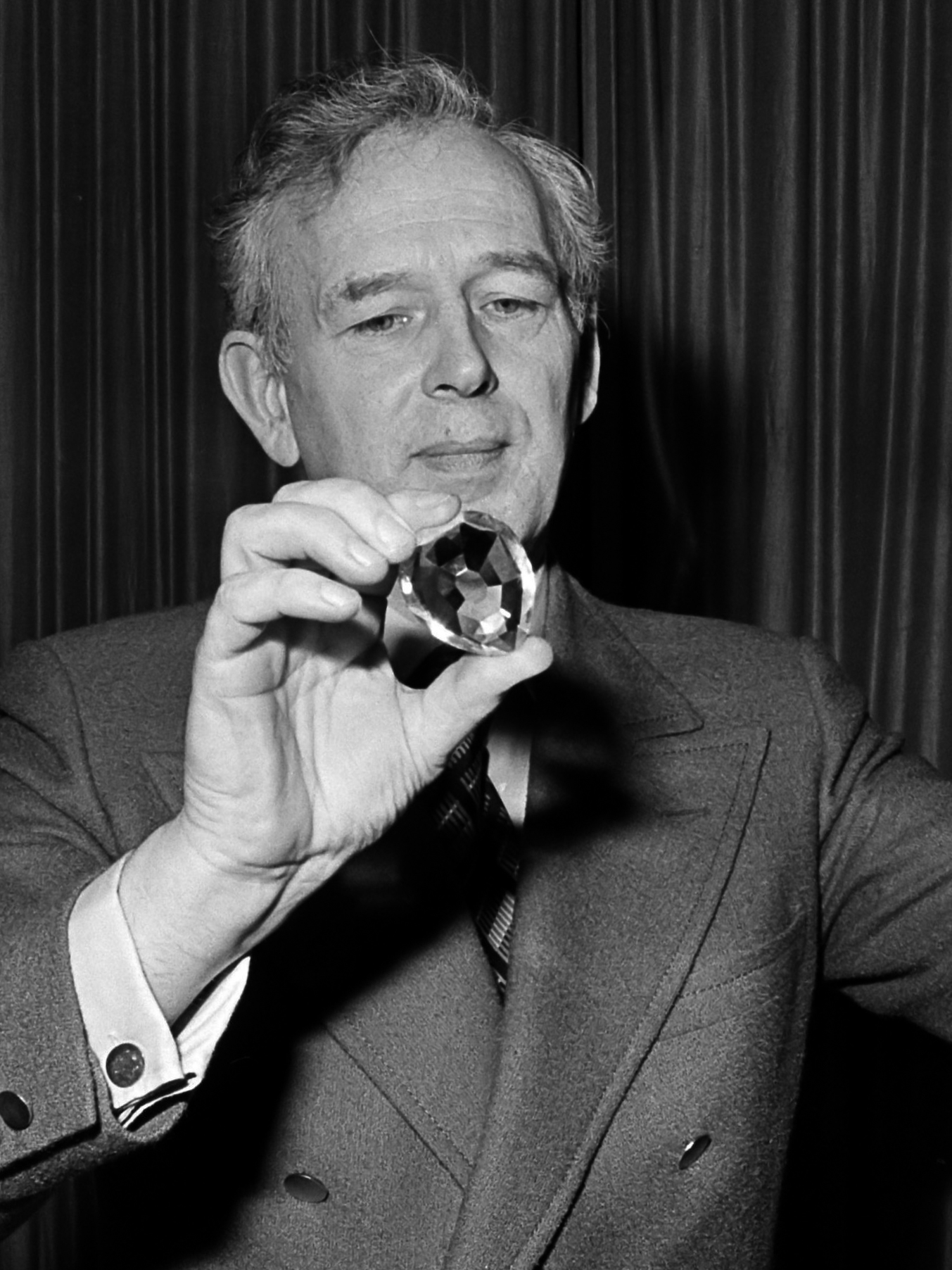
Norris McWhirter

- 1 April
  - Paul Atkinson, rock guitarist (born 1946)
  - Arthur Halestrap, one of the last surviving British soldiers of World War I (born 1898)
- 4 April – Alwyn Williams, geologist (born 1921)
- 7 April – Robert Sangster, racehorse owner (born 1936)
- 8 April – Adrian Beers, double bass player (born 1916)
- 10 April – Ben Pimlott, historian (born 1945)
- 13 April – Caron Keating, television presenter (born 1962)
- 14 April
  - Micheline Charest, television producer (born 1953)
  - Robin Popplestone, computer scientist (born 1938)
- 17 April – Geraint Howells, politician (born 1925)
- 19 April
  - Philip Locke, actor (born 1928)
  - John Maynard Smith, biologist and geneticist (born 1920)
  - Norris McWhirter, political activist and television presenter, twin brother of Ross McWhirter (born 1925)
  - Ronnie Simpson, footballer and football manager (born 1930)
- 20 April – Ian Robinson, publisher (born 1934)
- 23 April – Len Vale-Onslow, motorcycle manufacturer (born 1900)
- 24 April
  - Brian Manning, historian (born 1927)
- 25 April – Thom Gunn, poet (born 1929)
- 29 April – John Henniker-Major, 8th Baron Henniker, politician and diplomat (born 1916)
- 30 April – Jeffrey Alan Gray, psychiatrist (born 1934)

=== May ===
11th Duke of Devonshire

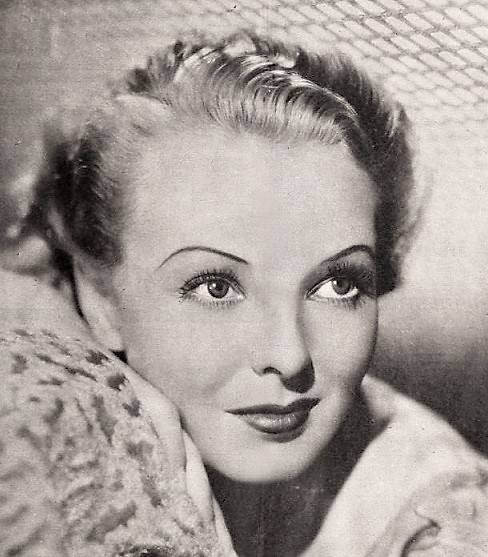
Anna Lee

- 3 May
  - Anthony Ainley, actor (born 1932)
  - Andrew Cavendish, 11th Duke of Devonshire, peer (born 1920)
- 4 May – Erik Smith, record producer (born 1931, Germany)
- 5 May – John Cornforth, architectural historian (born 1937)
- 7 May – Douglas John Foskett, librarian (born 1918)
- 9 May – Percy M. Young, composer and musicologist (born 1912)
- 10 May – Dennis Wilshaw, footballer (born 1926)
- 11 May – Danny McLennan, footballer and coach (born 1925)
- 14 May
  - Anna Lee, actress (born 1913)
  - Shaun Sutton, television executive (born 1919)
- 15 May – Clint Warwick, bassist (The Moody Blues) (born 1940)
- 16 May – Peter Hill-Norton, Baron Hill-Norton, Admiral of the Fleet (born 1915)
- 20 May – Len Murray, Baron Murray of Epping Forest, trade union leader (born 1922)
- 23 May
  - Sally Gilmour, ballerina (born 1921)
  - Adele Leigh, opera singer (born 1928)
- 27 May
  - Jim Marshall, politician (born 1941)
  - Ronald Smith, pianist (born 1922)
- 29 May – Jack Rosenthal, playwright (born 1931)

=== June ===
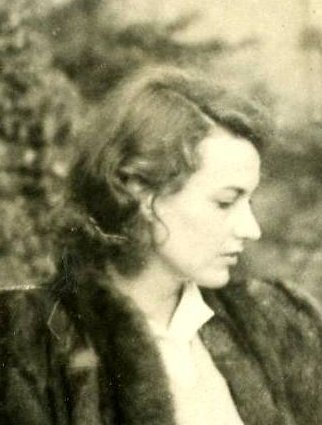
Judy Campbell

- 3 June – Frances Shand Kydd, mother of Diana, Princess of Wales and grandmother of Princes William and Harry (born 1936)
- 5 June – Iona Brown, violinist and conductor (born 1941)
- 6 June – Judy Campbell, actress (born 1916)
- 7 June – Don Potter, sculptor and potter (born 1902)
- 12 June
  - Stanley O'Toole, film producer (born 1939)
  - Geoffrey Thompson, businessman (born 1936)
- 13 June – Stuart Hampshire, philosopher (born 1914)
- 15 June – J. Gwyn Griffiths, poet and Egyptologist (born 1911)
- 18 June – Frederick Jaeger, actor (born 1928, Germany)
- 19 June – Colin McCormack, actor (born 1941)
- 23 June – Doris Thompson, businesswoman, owner of Blackpool Pleasure Beach (born 1903)
- 26 June – Muriel Angelus, actress (born 1912)
- 27 June – Hugh B. Cave, science fiction writer (born 1910)
- 28 June – Anthony Buckeridge, writer (born 1912)

=== July ===
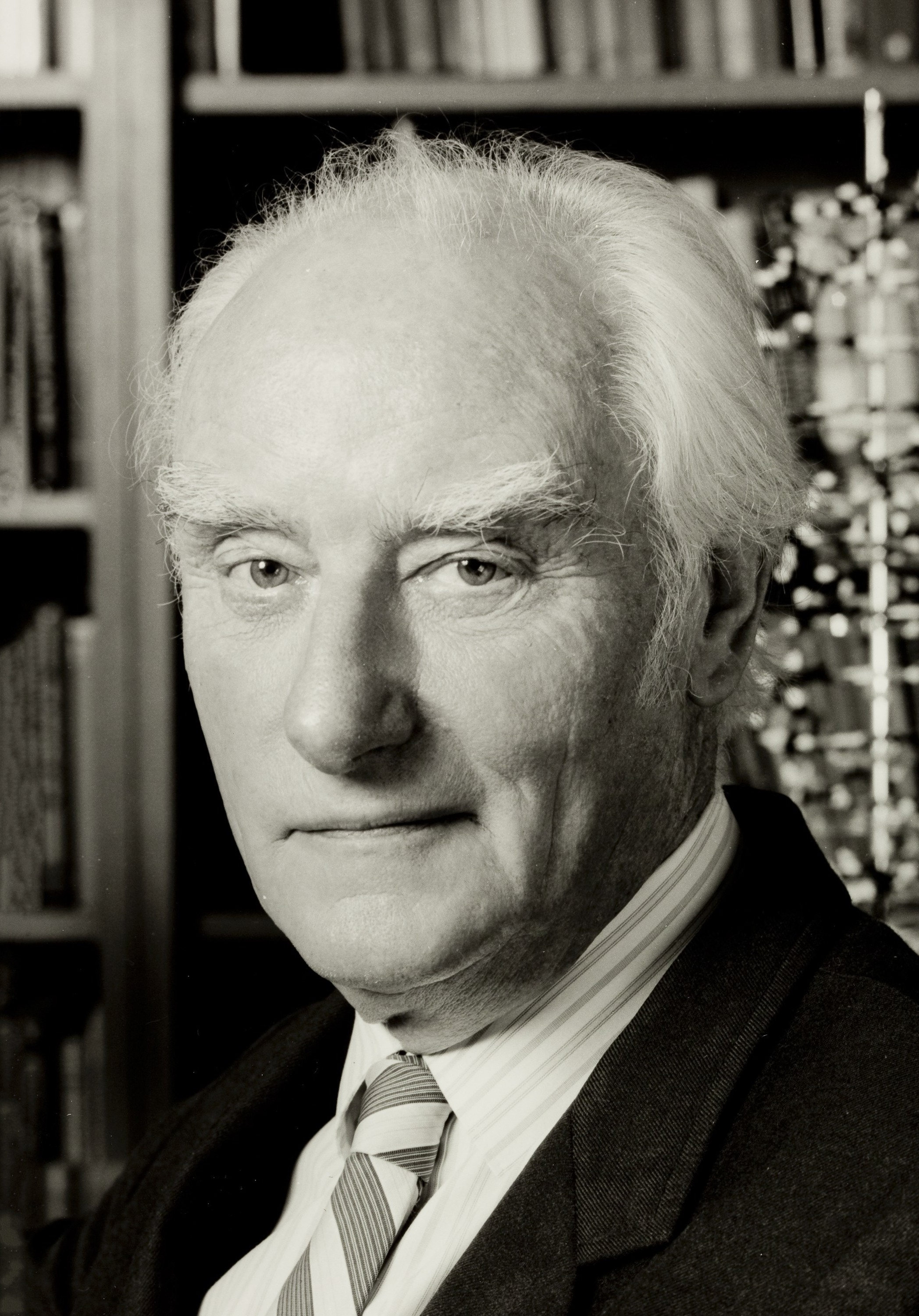
Francis Crick

- 1 July
  - Peter Barnes, playwright and screenwriter (born 1931)
  - Richard May, judge (born 1938)
- 3 July – John Barron, actor (born 1920)
- 5 July – Robert Burchfield, lexicographer (Oxford English Dictionary) (born 1923)
- 6 July – Peter Birks, academic lawyer (born 1941)
- 14 July – Arnold Ziff, businessman and philanthropist (born 1927)
- 16 July – Frank Farmer, physicist (born 1912)
- 17 July – Pat Roach, wrestler and actor (born 1937)
- 18 July – Paul Foot, journalist and nephew of former Labour Party leader Michael Foot (born 1937)
- 21 July – Julian Ridsdale, politician (born 1915)
- 23 July – Alan Cook, physicist (born 1922)
- 28 July
  - Francis Crick, scientist, discoverer of the structure of DNA (born 1916)
  - Margo McLennan, actress (born 1938)

=== August ===
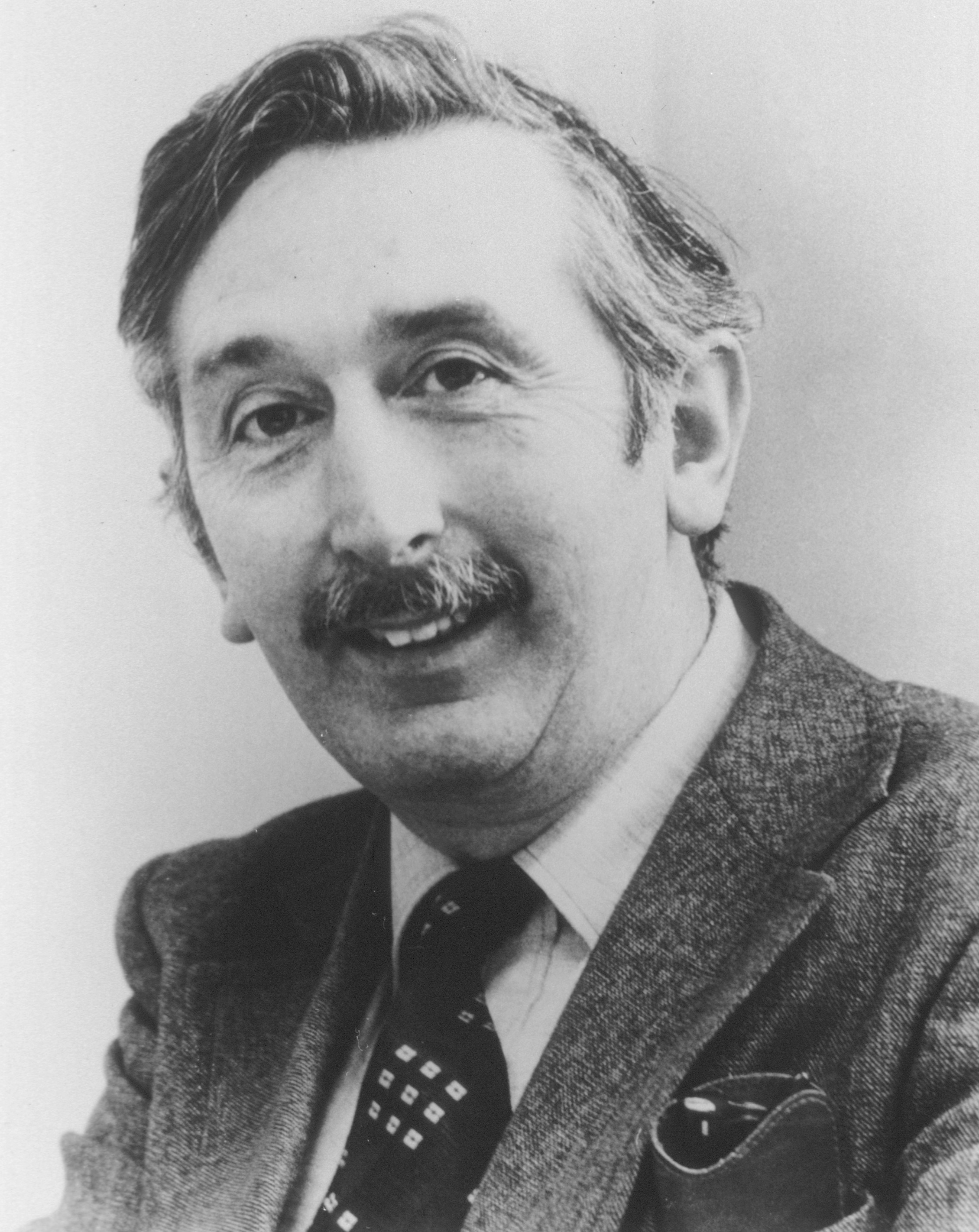
Godfrey Hounsfield

- 1 August – Laurence Stark, World War II flying ace (born 1920)
- 4 August – Robert Yewdall Jennings, judge (International Court of Justice) (born 1913)
- 7 August
  - Colin Bibby, ornithologist (born 1948)
  - Bernard Levin, writer and journalist (born 1928)
  - Gordon Smith, footballer (born 1924)
- 12 August
  - Sir Godfrey Hounsfield, electrical engineer and inventor, recipient of the Nobel Prize in Physiology or Medicine (born 1919)
  - Peter Woodthorpe, actor (born 1931)
- 14 August – Trevor Skeet, lawyer (born 1918, New Zealand)
- 16 August – Stephen Terrell, barrister and politician (born 1916)
- 17 August – Sheila Callender, physician (born 1914)
- 18 August – Hugh Manning, actor (born 1920)
- 20 August – Leslie Shepard, author and archivist (born 1917)
- 25 August – Donald M. Ashton, film director (born 1919)
- 30 August – Derek Johnson, athlete (born 1933)
- 31 August – Carl Wayne, singer (The Move) (born 1943)

=== September ===
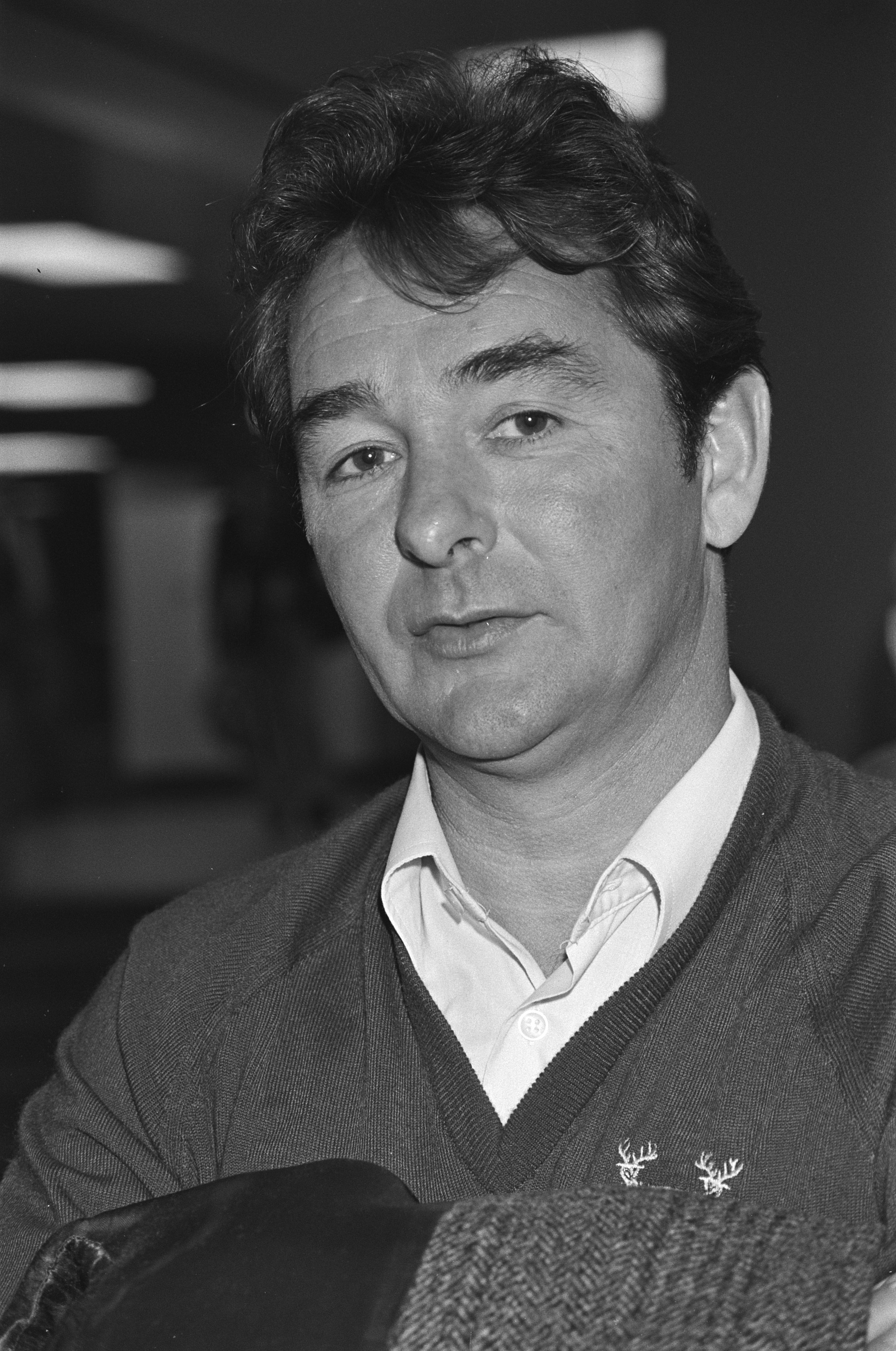
Brian Clough

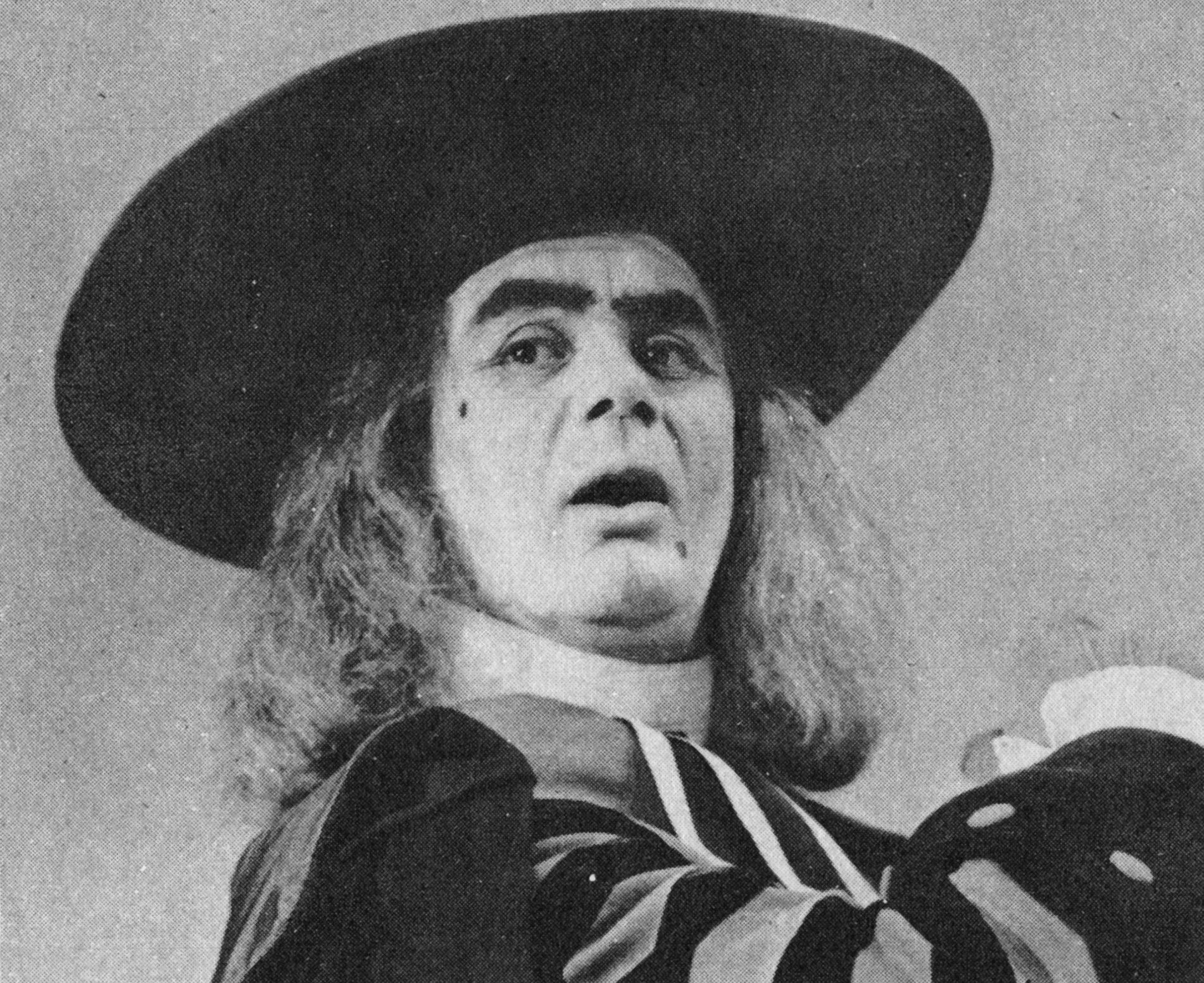
Kenneth Sandford

- 1 September
  - Kenneth Keith, Baron Keith of Castleacre, businessman and life peer (born 1916)
  - Gordon Parry, Baron Parry, politician (born 1925)
- 2 September – Brian Scarlett, physicist (born 1938)
- 4 September – Caroline Pratt, equestrian (killed while racing) (born 1962)
- 7 September – Fritha Goodey, actress (suicide) (born 1972)
- 9 September
  - Ian Cochrane, novelist (born 1941)
  - Thomas Kerr, aerospace engineer (born 1924)
- 10 September – Glyn Owen, actor (born 1928)
- 12 September – John Buller, composer (born 1927)
- 13 September – Eric Sams, musicologist and Shakespeare scholar (born 1926)
- 14 September – John Seymour, author and self-sufficiency campaigner (born 1914)
- 17 September – Katharina Dalton, physician (born 1916)
- 19 September
  - Sir Stanley Clarke, businessman and philanthropist (born 1933)
  - Kenneth Sandford, opera singer (born 1924)
- 20 September – Brian Clough, footballer and football manager (born 1935)
- 23 September
  - Nigel Nicolson, writer and politician (born 1917)
  - Maurice Michael Stephens, World War II flying ace (born 1919)
- 25 September – Michael Davies, writer on Roman Catholicism (born 1936)
- 30 September – Michael Relph, film producer and film director (born 1915)

=== October ===
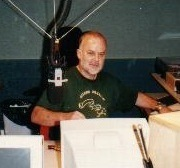
John Peel

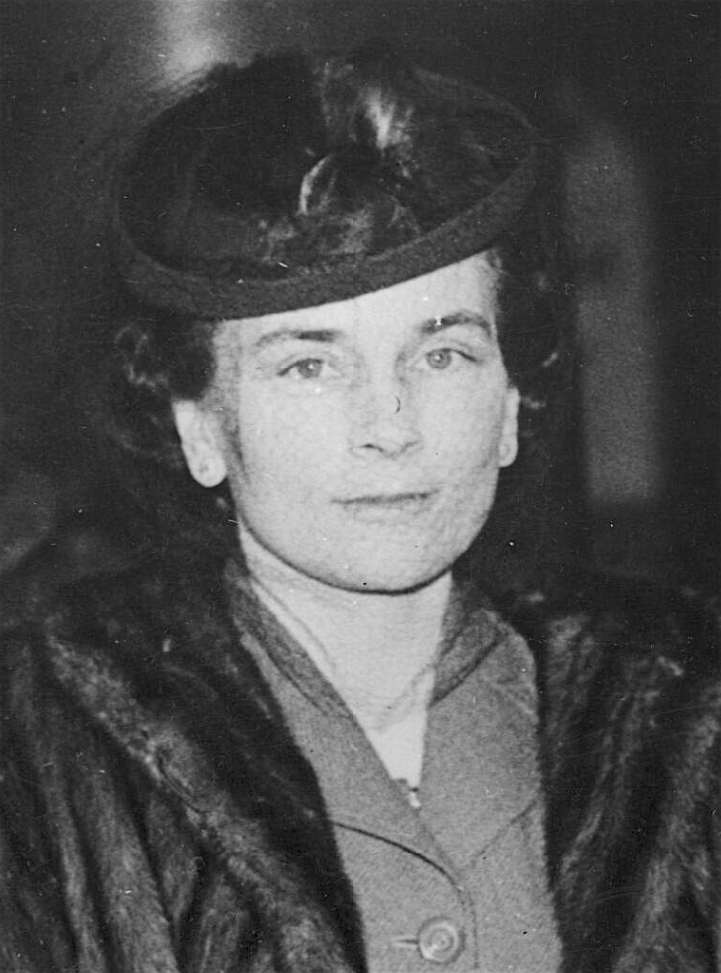
Princess Alice, Duchess of Gloucester

- 4 October – Michael Grant, ancient historian (born 1914)
- 6 October
  - William Clark, Baron Clark of Kempston, politician (born 1917)
  - Pete McCarthy, broadcaster and travel writer (born 1951)
- 7 October
  - Kenneth Bigley, civil engineer (executed in Iraq) (born 1942)
  - Tony Lanfranchi, racing driver (born 1935)
  - Rosemary Murray, chemist and professor (born 1913)
- 9 October – Bryan R. Wilson, author of religious books (born 1926)
- 11 October
  - Paul Bryan, politician (born 1913)
  - Peter Kerr, 12th Marquess of Lothian, peer and landowner (born 1922)
- 13 October
  - Bernice Rubens, novelist (born 1928)
  - Ivor Wood, television animator (born 1932)
- 14 October – Sheila Keith, actress (born 1920)
- 15 October – Bill Eyden, jazz drummer (born 1930)
- 16 October
  - Vincent Brome, writer (born 1910)
  - Harold Perkin, social historian (born 1926)
- 18 October – Nancy Carline, artist (born 1909)
- 20 October – Lynda Lee-Potter, Daily Mail columnist (born 1935)
- 23 October – Bill Nicholson, footballer and football manager (born 1919)
- 25 October – John Peel, DJ and radio presenter (born 1939)
- 29 October
  - Princess Alice, Duchess of Gloucester, member of the Royal Family and last surviving aunt of The Queen (born 1901)

=== November ===
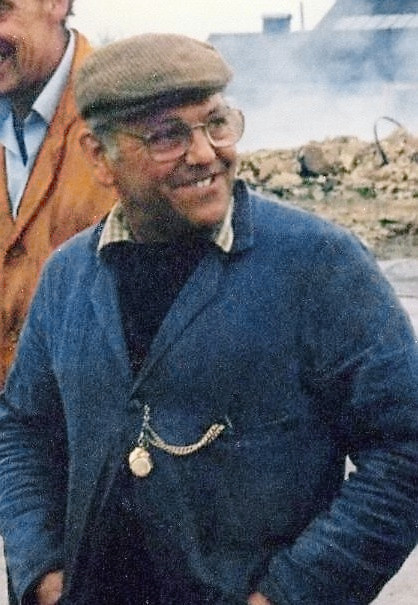
Fred Dibnah

- 1 November – James Hanson, Baron Hanson, industrialist (born 1922)
- 4 November – Robert Heaton, songwriter and drummer (New Model Army) (born 1961)
- 5 November – Basil McIvor, politician (born 1928)
- c. 5 November – Anthony Ashley-Cooper, 10th Earl of Shaftesbury, peer (born 1938)
- 6 November
  - Fred Dibnah, steeplejack and television personality (born 1938)
  - Robert Lang, actor (born 1934)
- 9 November – Emlyn Hughes, footballer, football manager and TV gameshow captain (born 1947)
- 13 November
  - John Balance, English singer-songwriter (Coil) (born 1962)
  - Keith Weller, footballer (born 1946)
- 14 November – David Stanley Evans, astronomer (born 1916)
- 19 November – John Robert Vane, pharmacologist, recipient of the Nobel Prize in Physiology or Medicine (born 1927)
- 22 November
  - Reginald Coates, civil engineer (born 1920)
  - Arthur Hopcraft, screenwriter (born 1932)
- 24 November – Janet Kear, ornithologist (born 1933)
- 25 November – Denis Richards, historian (born 1910)
- 26 November – C. Walter Hodges, writer, artist and Shakespearean scholar (born 1909)
- 27 November – John Dunn, radio presenter (born 1934)
- 28 November – Molly Weir, actress (born 1910)
- 30 November – Bill Brown, football goalkeeper (born 1931)

=== December ===
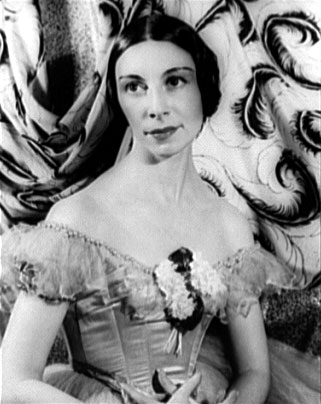
Dame Alicia Markova

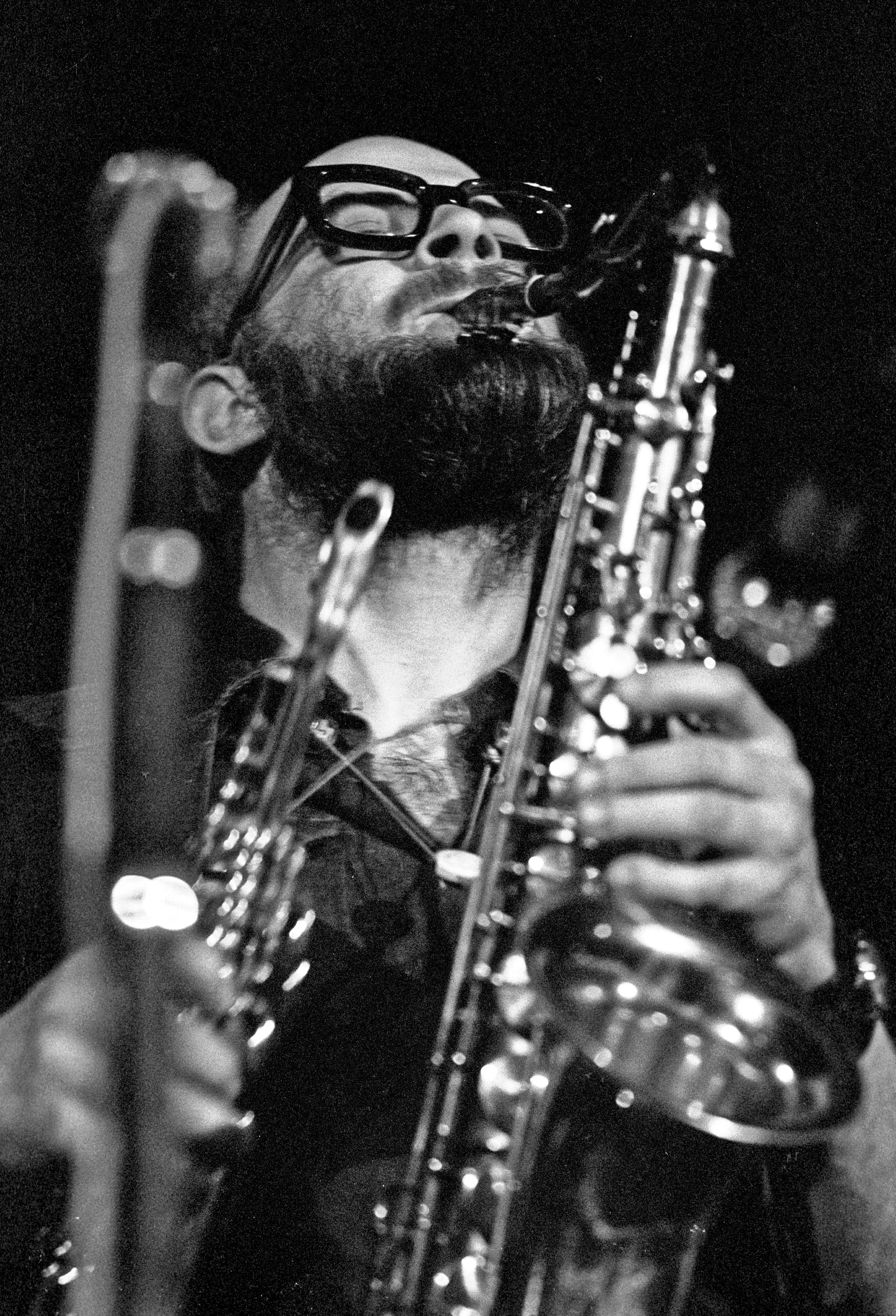
Dick Heckstall-Smith

- 1 December – Norman Newell, record producer and lyricist (born 1919)
- 2 December
  - Kevin Coyne, singer and composer (born 1944)
  - Dame Alicia Markova, ballerina (born 1910)
- 6 December
  - Frank Reginald Carey, World War II air ace (born 1912)
  - Adrian Morris, artist (born 1929)
- 8 December – Leslie Scarman, Baron Scarman, judge (born 1911)
- 13 December – David Wheeler, computer scientist (born 1927)
- 14 December – Harry Bowcott, rugby union player and manager (born 1907)
- 15 December
  - Harry Errington, only London firefighter to receive the George Cross in World War II (born 1910)
  - Sidonie Goossens, harpist (born 1899)
- 17 December – Dick Heckstall-Smith, saxophonist (born 1934)
- 18 December – Anthony Sampson, writer and journalist (Mandela: The Authorised Biography) (born 1926)
- 19 December – Richard Best, film editor (born 1916)
- 23 December
  - Richard Abel Smith, army officer (born 1933)
  - John W. Duarte, composer and guitarist (born 1919)
  - Ifor James, horn player (born 1931)
- 24 December
  - Richard Annand, soldier, first recipient of the Victoria Cross during World War II (born 1914)
  - Anthony Meyer, former Conservative MP who unsuccessfully challenged Margaret Thatcher's leadership in 1989 (born 1920)
  - Dame Rosemary Rue, physicist and civil servant (born 1928)
- 26 December
  - Garard Green, actor (born 1924)
  - Sir Angus Ogilvy, husband of Princess Alexandra (born 1928)
  - Frank Pantridge, physician (born 1916)
- 29 December – John Bridgeman, sculptor (born 1916)

== See also ==
- 2004 in British music
- 2004 in British television
- List of British films of 2004
- 2004 in England
