= NCS: Manhunt =

British television crime drama series

- Title card
- Genre: Crime drama police procedural
- Created by: Malcolm McKay
- Written by: Malcolm McKay
- Directed by: Michael Whyte; Paul Unwin
- Starring: David Suchet; Keith Barron; Samantha Bond; Melanie Hill; Sara Stewart; Jonathan Phillips; Gerard Horan
- Country of origin: United Kingdom
- Original language: English
- No. of series: 1
- No. of episodes: 8

Production
- Executive producer: Fred Tammes
- Producer: Sue Austen
- Cinematography: Fred Tammes
- Editor: Ian Sutherland
- Running time: 60 minutes
- Production company: BBC Home Entertainment

Original release
- Network: BBC One
- Release: 26 March 2001 – 19 March 2002

NCS: Manhunt is a British television crime drama series, starring David Suchet, and based on the National Crime Squad. Created by Malcolm McKay, the series premiered with a two-part pilot episode on BBC One on 26 March 2001. A full series of six episodes debuted on 4 March 2002, and concluded on 19 March 2002. Despite the series' popularity, and strong viewing figures, a second series was never commissioned. Notably, neither the pilot nor the complete series has ever been issued on DVD, although the series was repeated in its entirety on Forces TV in 2016. The series notably starred Michael Fassbender in one of his earliest television roles, after appearing in Band of Brothers the previous year. Kenneth Cranham and Phyllis Logan also co-starred in the pilot episode.

David Suchet said of his role in the series, "I don't ever recollect reading a script like this and I've certainly never seen anything like it on television before. When I read it, I was mesmerised. It was quite impossible to say no. Borne is probably the most complex character in the team. He is a man who fascinates by being endlessly enigmatic. He uses language sparingly, but with him everything is going on underneath the surface. And in a sense, I'm not playing another detective at all. I'm merely playing a different, complex human being who just happens to be a detective. You may find him in a police station, but I'd like to think that the audience are aching to see him too."

== Cast ==
=== Regular cast ===
- David Suchet as Detective Inspector John Borne
- Keith Barron as Detective Superintendent Bob Beausoleil
- Samantha Bond as Detective Sergeant Maureen Picasso
- Melanie Hill as Detective Sergeant Ruby Sparks
- Jonathan Phillips as Detective Sergeant Peter Moon
- Gerard Horan as Detective Constable Charlie Spanish
- Sara Stewart as Detective Constable Mary D'Eye
- Jenny Jules as Detective Constable Karen Bogard-Black
- Ace Bhatti as Detective Constable Johnny Khan
- Paul McKay as Detective Constable Chrissie Crowe
- Guy Scantlebury as Detective Constable Eddie Guerin (Pilot and episodes 1 and 2)
- Michael Fassbender as Detective Constable Jack Silver (Episodes 3–6)

=== Supporting cast ===
- Malcolm Tierney as Superintendent Charlie Vanne (Pilot)
- Phyllis Logan as Inspector Anne Warwick (Pilot)
- Kenneth Cranham as Ricky Valesi (Pilot)
- Steven Berkoff as George Rolf (Episodes 1 and 2)
- Anita Dobson as Jean Harris (Episodes 1 and 2)
- Zawe Ashton as Mia Davis (Episodes 1 and 2)
- Ralph Brown as Ray Du Barriatte (Episodes 1, 2 and 6)
- Daniel Mays as Danny Bird (Episodes 1 and 2)
- Nicky Henson as Vincent Fairey (Episodes 3 and 4)
- Michael McKell as Lee Wilde (Episodes 3 and 4)
- Steve Speirs as Benny Luck (Episode 6)

== Episodes ==
=== Pilot (2001) ===
No.	Title	Directed by	Written by	Original release date	Viewers (millions)
1	"Pilot: Part 1"	Michael Whyte	Malcolm McKay	26 March 2001	7.41
When convicted criminal Ricky Valesi kidnaps the mother of Inspector Anne Warwick, a link between the officer and Valesi is unveiled.
2	"Pilot: Part 2"	Michael Whyte	Malcolm McKay	27 March 2001	7.30
Borne and the team continue their investigation and make a surprising discovery about Anne Warwick's personal life. What appeared to be a straightforward kidnapping soon escalates into a harrowing case of murder, conspiracy and betrayal.

=== Series (2002) ===
No.	Title	Directed by	Written by	Original release date	Viewers (millions)
1	"Collision Course: Part 1"	Michael Whyte	Malcolm McKay	4 March 2002	6.08
The team ambushes a group of drug smugglers who have landed in a Norfolk field and seize a consignment of cocaine. They plan to track the drugs to source through the pilot and one of the crew, but are taken off the case to deal with a series of contract killings by two leather-clad scooter riders using silenced handguns.
2	"Collision Course: Part 2"	Michael Whyte	Malcolm McKay	5 March 2002	5.41
The team struggles to come to terms with the loss of one of their own. A series of arrests helps to raise spirits, and a tip-off leads Borne to an old acquaintance. Borne becomes convinced that a criminal whom he convicted five years earlier holds the key to the contract killings.
3	"Tinderbox: Part 1"	Paul Unwin	Malcolm McKay	11 March 2002	5.22
A new member joins the team, which is dispatched to investigate a series of apparently straightforward armed robberies on Indian restaurants in Birmingham. MI5 gets involved when a paratrooper is killed.
4	"Tinderbox: Part 2"	Paul Unwin	Malcolm McKay	12 March 2002	4.60
It becomes clear that the crimes are racially motivated, and the team uncovers a secretive right-wing organisation bent on starting a race war.
5	"Out of Time: Part 1"	Michael Whyte	Malcolm McKay	18 March 2002	4.93
The team attempts to bring down the Colombian cocaine smuggling ring. Information has been received that a shipment is on its way. To get to the elusive "Number One", the detectives go after dealers further down the supply chain, but one of the team is kidnapped outside Benny Luck's club.
6	"Out of Time: Part 2"	Michael Whyte	Malcolm McKay	19 March 2002	Under 4.33
The team sets up a deal to sell the shipment of drugs to Benny Luck, who arranges to meet the Colombians at Tilbury docks, setting up a dramatic showdown.
