= Sara Stewart =

Scottish actress

- Occupation: Actress
- Years active: 1990–present
- Spouse: Aden Gillett
- Children: 2

Sara Stewart Gillett is a Scottish actress. She played Stella in Sugar Rush.

== Career ==
=== Theatre ===
Stewart's theatre credits include: Noël Coward's Present Laughter (2007–2008) and The Hour We Knew Nothing of Each Other at the National Theatre, London, Natalya Petrovna in Ivan Turgenev's A Month in the Country for the RSC, The Pain and the Itch (2007) at the Royal Court, London, and Proof (2002) at the Donmar Warehouse, London.

=== Television ===
On television, she has starred in programmes such as: Taggart in 1992 as Alison Bain, a TV journalist appearing alongside Mark McManus in Ring of Deceit, Wire in the Blood, Life Begins, Monarch of the Glen, Rebus, NCS: Manhunt, Auf Wiedersehen, Pet as Heather Lane, Mayo, as Hope Hendrick, Holby City as Kathryn MacKenzie, A Touch of Frost as Martine Phillips, New Tricks as Lulu Questor, The House of Eliott as Francine Baily. She appeared as 'Susie' in a 1993 episode of Minder. Stewart played the role of the production assistant, Jenny, in the first series of Drop the Dead Donkey. In the fifth episode of the second series of Doctor Finlay, she played the part of Jean Geddie. She also appeared in a single episode of the BBC hit comedy Men Behaving Badly as a friend of Deborah, in the episode of Waking the Dead, Towers of Silence and in the episode of Hetty Wainthropp Investigates series 3, "Helping Hansi" (1998).

She appeared in two Midsomer Murders episodes: “Death In Chorus” (2006) as Carolyn Armitage and “The Flying Club” (2014) as Miranda Darnley. Miracle Landing on the Hudson 2014 played Pam Seagle.

Sara played the Sheriff of Nottingham's sister, Davina, in Sister Hood, the opening episode of Season 2 of Robin Hood (2007). Her most recent roles were as Stella in the hit 2005 TV series, Sugar Rush, and as a transgender character Gaynor in an episode of the BBC drama Ashes to Ashes. She has been seen at Patricia in the Sky1 adaptation of Martina Cole's The Take. In 2011 and 2012 Stewart played Professor Jean Shales in series 1 and 2 of the Channel 4 comedy series Fresh Meat. Her voice appears as the computer in the 2005 Doctor Who episode "The End of the World". In 2014 she appeared in Quirke as Rose. In 2014, she appeared as a QC in an episode of EastEnders. She played American journalist Winifred Bonfils Black in ITV's 2013 Mr Selfridge, and Susie Parks in the 2017 BBC One drama TV series Doctor Foster (episodes 1–2, 4–5).

In 2018, she appeared as Professor Ariane Cornell in an episode of Casualty. An associate of Connie Beauchamp, Cornell is involved in removing a cancerous tumor from her heart and saving her life. Stewart later appeared as Cornell in two episodes of Holby City. She played Mel Hollis in series 3 of ITV's Unforgotten.

In 2020, she appeared in episode 3.3 "The Sticking Place" of the BBC TV series Shakespeare & Hathaway: Private Investigators.

In 2022, she appeared as Lady Margot Hawthorne in episode 9.6 "The New Order" of the BBC TV series Father Brown.

In 2023, she appeared as Fernanda Robinson in episode "Dead Man’s Grip" of the ITV series Grace.

=== Film ===
Her work in film includes The Road to Guantanamo, A Cock and Bull Story, Batman Begins (as Martha Wayne), London Voodoo, The Winslow Boy and Mrs. Brown.

== Personal life ==
She holds dual citizenship for the UK and the US. Now based in Twickenham, she was married to actor Aden Gillett. They have two children, son Sam and daughter India. She was later in a relationship with actor Mark Powley. She had surgery for breast cancer in 2011, and advocates for causes that promote awareness of and fighting the disease.

== Filmography ==
=== Film ===
Year	Film	Role	Notes
1997	Mrs Brown	Princess Alexandra	
1999	The Winslow Boy	Miss Barnes	
2000	Meaningful Sex	Mistress Monica	Television film
2003	Three Blind Mice	Thomas' Boss	
2004	London Voodoo	Sarah Mathers	
2005	Batman Begins	Martha Wayne	
2005	A Cock and Bull Story	Joanna	
2005	A Very Social Secretary	Carole Caplin	Television film
2006	The Road to Guantánamo	Interrogator	
2007	Medium Rare	Camille	Short film
2008	Genova	Susanna	
2009	Act of God	Alison Barber	
2011	The Best Exotic Marigold Hotel	Madge's Daughter	
2012	Sightseers	Blond Boy's Mother	
2013	Philomena	Marcia Weller	
2013	Hello Sunshine	Vanessa	Short film
2013	Side by Side	Janice Dear	
2014	Miracle Landing on the Hudson	Pam Seagle	Television film
2014	Fear of Water	Helen	
2014	The Face of an Angel	Sarah	
2016	Billionaire Ransom	Lisa Hartmann	
2017	Transformers: The Last Knight	Viviane's Mum	
2018	The Princess Switch	Queen Caroline Wyndham	
2020	Slow-Down	Thalia	Short film
2021	Enjoy	Laura	Short film
2022	Empire of Light	Brenda Ellis	

=== Television ===
Year	Film	Role	Notes
1990	Drop the Dead Donkey	Jenny	Recurring role; 4 episodes
1991	The House of Eliott	Francine Bailey	Episode: "Series 1, Episode 7"
1992	Taggart	Alison Bain	Episode: "Ring of Deceit"
1992	Agatha Christie's Poirot	Jane Olivera	Episode: "One, Two, Buckle My Shoe"
1992	The Good Guys	Jane Miller	Episode: "Find the Lady"
1993	Minder	Susie	Episode: "Uneasy Rider"
1994	Anna Lee	Lauren Jones	Episode: "The Cook's Tale"
1994	Doctor Finlay	Jean Geddie	Episode: "Secrecy"
1996	Men Behaving Badly	Judy	Episode: "Cowardice"
1996	Crocodile Shoes II	Lucy Lynn	Miniseries; 5 episodes
1998	Space Island One	Claudia Lang	Episode: "All the News That Fits"
1998	Hetty Wainthropp Investigates	Laura Swinbank	Episode: "Helping Hansi"
1998	Supply & Demand	Lauren	Episode: "Golden Goose"
1999	People Like Us		Episode: "The Head Teacher"
2000	Chambers	Emma Summerton	Episode: "The Masons"
2000	Too Much Sun	Tracey Jo	Episode: "Obsession"
2000–2001	Rebus	DCI Gill Templer	Recurring role; 4 episodes
2001–2002	NCS: Manhunt	DC Mary D'Eye	Series regular; 8 episodes
2003	Monarch of the Glen	Amanda MacLeish	Recurring role; 3 episodes
2004	Auf Wiedersehen, Pet	Heather Lane	Episode: "Britannia Waives the Rules"
2004	As If	Counsellor	Episode: "Rob's POV"
2005	Holby City	Kathryn MacKenzie	Recurring role; 4 episodes
2005	Wire in the Blood	Patricia	Episode: "Nothing But the Night"
2005	Doctor Who	Computer	Episode: "The End of the World"
2005	Waking the Dead	Claire Yardley	Episode: "Towers of Silence"
2005	A Touch of Frost	Martine Phillips	Episode: "Near Death Experience"
2005	Taggart	Yvonne Petrie	Episode: "A Death Foretold"
2005–2006	Sugar Rush	Stella	Series regular; 20 episodes
2006	Mayo	Hope Kendrick	Episode: "A Species of Revenge"
2006	Life Begins	Yvonne	Episode: "Series 3, Episode 3"
2006	Midsomer Murders	Carolyn Armitage	Episode: "Death in Chorus"
2007	Robin Hood	Davina / Rose	Episode: "Sisterhood"
2007	Secret Diary of a Call Girl	Fiona	Episode: "Episode 1.8"
2008	New Tricks	Lulu Questor	Episode: "Magic Majestic"
2009	Doctors	Deborah Cavanagh	Episode: "The Romantics"
2009	Demons	Professor Lambert	Episode: "Smitten"
2009	Ashes to Ashes	Gaynor Mason	Episode: "Series 2, Episode 5"
2009	The Take	Patricia	Miniseries; 3 episodes
2009	The Prisoner	1891	Episode: "Darling"
2011–2012	Fresh Meat	Professor Jean Shales	Recurring role; 5 episodes
2012	Above Suspicion	Andrea Lesser	Episode: "Silent Scream"
2012	Playhouse Presents	Bettina Haussman	Episode: "Minor Character"
2012	Strike Back	Lieutenant Hodge	Episode: "Vengeance"
2012	Wizards vs Aliens	Miss Webster	Episode: "Dawn of the Nekross"
2013	Pramface	Louise	Episode: "The Edge of Hell"
2013	Jo	Madame Bachelot	Episode: "Place Vendôme"
2014	Midsomer Murders	Miranda Darnley	Episode: "The Flying Club"
2014	Quirke	Rose Crawford	Miniseries; 2 episodes
2014	Mr Selfridge	Winifred Bonfils Black	Episode: "Series 2, Episode 9"
2014	EastEnders	QC	Recurring role; 3 episodes
2015	Crossing Lines	Lydia Hanbury	Episode: "In Loco Parentis"
2015	Doctors	Faye Durran	Episode: "The Power of You"
2015–2017	Doctor Foster	Susie Parks	Recurring role; 6 episodes
2016	The Night Manager	Barbara Vandon	Recurring role; 2 episodes
2018	Casualty	Professor Cornell	Episode: "Series 32, Episode 18"
2018	Unforgotten	Mel Hollis	Series regular; 6 episodes
2018–2019	Holby City	Professor Arianne Cornell	Recurring role; 2 episodes
2020	Shakespeare & Hathaway: Private Investigators	Lady Tatiana Mortimer	Episode: "The Sticking Place"
2021	La Fortuna	Jueza Ellis	Recurring role; 4 episodes
2021	Queens of Mystery	Dr Angela Isherwood	Episode: "Sparring with Death"
2022	Father Brown	Lady Margot Hawthorne	Episode: "The New Order"
2022	State of the Union	Cathy	Episode: "Big Mustard"
2022	Cell 8	Alice Finnigan	Miniseries; 5 episodes
2022	Accidental Guru	Rebecca	Episode: "Pilot"
2023	Grace	Fernanda Robinson	Episode: "Dead Man's Grip"
2023	Dalgliesh	Venetia Aldridge	Episode: "A Certain Justice"
2023	Mrs Sidhu Investigates	Bridget Anderson	Episode: "Breaking Convention"
