= Cameron Sinclair (composer) =

Scottish composer, conductor and percussionist

Cameron Sinclair is a Scottish composer, conductor and percussionist based in London.

== Education ==
He trained at the Guildhall School of Music and Drama and the University of Sussex, studying composition with Martin Butler and Jonathan Harvey. He works with orchestras including the Philharmonia, Glyndebourne and Chamber Orchestra of Europe.

== Career ==
In 2001 he was awarded an International Fellowship from the Arts Council of England to become Artist in Residence at Cittadellarte, an institution in Northern Italy dedicated to cross-disciplinary work directed by world-renowned visual artist Michelangelo Pistoletto. He collaborated with other members of Unidee to create new work based on Pistoletto's philosophy of 'art at the centre of a responsible transformation of society', which was exhibited at Mukha in Antwerp, the Shedhalle in Zurich and for Cittadellarte's Arte al Centro exhibitions in Biella and Turin.

He was director of the Vietato L'Accesso Festival, which took place in Biella, Italy, in September 2003. The festival was devised in collaboration with visual artists, architects, environmentalists and local food producers. The series of events - including Sinclair's participative concert La Memoria dell'Acqua - invited local people to become involved in the regeneration of old industrial buildings and change their perceptions of the neglected river area.

He continued his association with Michelangelo Pistoletto with an orchestral commission for Il Terzo Paradiso, a large-scale artistic takeover of the island of San Servolo for the Venice Biennale in 2005.

He was commissioned to create the opening event for the Turin Biennale in 2002, bringing together musicians representative of the diverse ethnic groups in Turin with a classical chamber orchestra to play together in Turin's temple of high culture, the Teatro Regio.

Cameron Sinclair is teaching at Royal College of Music.

== Recognition ==
In 2004 he won a British Composer Award for The Secret of the Universe.

== Published Works ==
=== Solo Works ===
- Tarantella (Xylophone / Marimba)
- Marche Cassé (Snare Drum)
- Vaya puente (Snare Drum & Cowbell)
- Antrieb (Snare Drum)
- 3 Tanzen (Timpani)
- Zonal 1 (Multiple Percussion)

=== Ensemble Works ===
- La Città Invisibile, commissioned by the Turin Biennial 2002 and performed in the Teatro Regio conducted by the composer, which brought together a classical chamber orchestra with groups of Indian, Egyptian, Tibetan and Cuban musicians to create the opening event of the festival.
- Making Waves, a performance work developed from collaboration with musicians from the Royal College of Music and scientists from the Medical Research Council, commissioned for the Creating Sparks Festival, London.
- Losing My Head, for pianist Joanna MacGregor.
- We Are Stars, Alleluia and The End of the Universe commissioned by Singscape
- Time Gentlemen, Please, commissioned by the Derry Festival for Ensemble Bash and performed on their UK tour.
- To Infinity and Beyond commissioned by the National Youth Orchestra of Great Britain and performed by the Philharmonia and Malaysian Philharmonic Orchestra.
- The Fly, integrating live electronics and performance, commissioned by New Noise and first performed at the Purcell Room, London at the Rhythm Sticks Festival and recorded for New Noise's CD released in June 2003.
- We are Stars, Alleluia, Story Water and De Angelis for Singscape.
- Striking Distance, for the Orchestra of St John's.
- A sound installation at the Wapping Project as part of the SPNM 2003 festival.
- A PRS award for a new work for the Britten Sinfonia and Harlow Chorus in 2005.
