= London Voodoo =

- Theatrical release poster
- Directed by: Robert Pratten
- Written by: Robert Pratten
- Produced by: Robert Pratten
- Starring: Doug Cockle; Sara Stewart; Sven-Bertil Taube; Michael Nyqvist; Jacqueline Boatswain
- Cinematography: Patrick Jackson
- Edited by: Matt Jessee
- Music by: Steven Severin
- Production company: Zen Films
- Distributed by: Heretic Films
- Release date: 11 March 2004 (Fearless Tales)
- Running time: 99 minutes
- Country: United Kingdom
- Language: English

London Voodoo is a 2004 British horror film written, produced, and directed by Robert Pratten; and starring Doug Cockle, and Sara Stewart. The film centers on an analyst who has relocated his family, only for his wife to become possessed by a dark spirit that wishes the family harm.

== Plot ==
When ambitious analyst Lincoln Mathers (played by Doug Cockle) relocates his family from New York to London, his wife Sarah (Sara Stewart) discovers a new disturbing power and becomes hostage to an ancient spirit. As Mathers notices that the family is tearing apart and that his wife's behavior becomes more violent and erratic, he accepts that to save the woman he married he must take a leap of faith.

== Cast ==
- Doug Cockle as Lincoln Mathers
- Sara Stewart as Sarah Mathers
- Grace Sprott as Beth Mathers
- Vonda Barnes as Kelly
- Trisha Mortimer as Fiona
- Sven-Bertil Taube as Lars
- Michael Nyqvist as Magnus
- Jacqueline Boatswain as Ruth
- Tony Freeman as McAlistair

== Release ==
=== Home media ===
London Voodoo was released on DVD by Heretic Films on 31 May 2005. It was later released by Nucleus Films on 30 October 2006.

== Reception ==
London Voodoo received mostly negative reviews upon its release. Dennis Harvey from Variety gave the film a mixed review, writing, "Maintaining a straight face even as the action takes a turn toward the ludicrous, English horror entry London Voodoo should please genre fans, though it lacks the originality or name thesps that might’ve merited theatrical pickup."
