= Robert Pratten =

Robert Pratten is CEO and Founder of Transmedia Storyteller Ltd, creators of Conducttr - a crisis simulation platform.

Pratten is the author of the book "Getting Started in Transmedia Storytelling: A Practical Guide for Beginners". ISBN 978-1-5153-3916-8

== Previous creative work ==
Pratten and his wife founded Zen Films in 2000 with the aim of making films that were "entertaining, thought-provoking and irreverent".

As a feature film director, Pratten has directed two features, London Voodoo (2004) and MindFlesh (2008).

London Voodoo received critical acclaim and won the Prix du Public (the Audience Award), at Cinenygma 2005 in Luxembourg, Best Feature at the Festival of Fantastic Films in Manchester, England, 2004, Best Feature at the Horror Fiesta 2004 in Warsaw, Poland, Best Acting at the Fearless Tales Genre Fest in San Francisco 2004, the Jury Award Best Feature at the Boston International Film Festival 2004 and Best Cinematography at the New York City Horror Fest 2004. Pratten also won the Best Director Award at the Fearless Tales Genre Fest in San Francisco 2004.

Mindflesh, based on the novel White Light by William Scheinman, received similar critical acclaim and Best Horror and the Philadelphia Independent Film Festival.

Pratten edited an anthology, Love and Sacrifice(2007), to accompany the UK release of London Voodoo.
