= Len Vale-Onslow =

British motorcycle builder

Leonard Leslie Hubert Vale-Onslow MBE
- Born: 2 May 1900
- Died: 23 April 2004 (aged 103)
- Known for: Making and selling motorbikes

Leonard Leslie Hubert Vale-Onslow MBE (2 May 1900 – 23 April 2004) was a motorcycle builder known for inventing the SOS racing bike in 1926. Based in Birmingham, England, he operated multiple motorcycle repair shops and resided above one of them. Vale-Onslow was actively involved in repairing and test-riding motorcycles throughout his career.

As a child, Vale-Onslow's six older brothers ran two garages in Birmingham and made him a small motorcycle. His brothers would take him to Sutton Park and teach him how to ride. Vale-Onslow lived in close proximity to his family, which included three children, six grandchildren, nine great-grandchildren, and three great-great-grandchildren.

In 1999, Vale-Onslow received the Member of the Order of the British Empire (MBE) for being recognized as Britain's oldest worker. Additionally, during the same year, he became the oldest subject of the television program "This Is Your Life."

He continued to ride until the age of 102. He died in 2004, shortly before his 104th birthday.
