= Home Office Circular 46/2004 =

Home Office Circular 46/2004 is guidance issued by the Home Office. Annex C of the circular addresses matters concerning the review of police injury pensions.

In January 2012 the circular was deemed to be unlawful in part by Judge Behrens, sitting at Leeds High Court. A further judicial review hearing, before Justice Supperstone at Leeds High Court in February 2012 held that part of Home Office circular 46/2004, concerning "Review of Injury Pensions once Officers reach 65", and paragraph 20 of section 5 of the Home Office 'Guidance on Medical Appeals under the Police Pensions Regulations 1987 and the Police (Injury Benefit) Regulations 2006' are inconsistent with the Police (Injury Benefits) Regulations 2006 and therefore unlawful.

An application for judicial review arising from further dispute over the legality of the Home Office guidance was settled by consent order in February 2014. The case to be heard was Regina on the application of John Slater v Secretaty of State for Home Department and The Chief Constable of Derbyshire, case number 16873/2013. The Home Office agreed to withdraw a further part of the guidance contained in Annex C to Home Office circular 46/2004.

Subsequently, on 21 February 2014, the Home Office withdrew the entirely of the Annex C guidance, and also similar guidance which formed part of a publication entitled, Guidance on Medical Appeals.

This article sets out a brief history of the circular.

== Legislation ==
Police injury pensions in England and Wales are governed by the Police (Injury Benefit) Regulations 2006. The Regulations are made under provision of the Police Pensions Act 1976.

Police officers who are injured on duty may be required to retire if the injury is such that it is likely to be permanent and prevents the individual from performing the ordinary duties of a constable. An injury pension may then be granted, and is payable for life.

The amount of pension paid depends on the officer's average pensionable pay, years of service and degree of disablement. Degree of disablement is determined by reference to the degree to which his/her earning capacity has been affected as a result of an injury received without his own default in the execution of his duty as a member of a police force. Earning capacity has been defined by the High Court to be, '. . . what the [injured person] is capable of doing and thus capable of earning. It is not a labour market assessment, or an assessment of whether somebody would actually pay him to do what he is capable of doing, whether or not in competition with other workers.'

A Police Authority may review the injury pension from time to time, at such intervals as may be suitable, and if it is found that there has been a substantial alteration in degree of disablement the pension shall be revised accordingly.

== The Home Office ==
The Home Office is a UK Government Department for policies in various areas, including policing, and includes agencies, non-departmental public bodies and inspectorates.

It issues guidance and information to these, often in the form of Circulars. Circulars are official Home Office documents that provide updates and details on policy and procedures. The Home Office states, They are useful to people who work for, or with, the Home Office or who need to know the latest policy updates.

Home Office guidance is advice only. It has no element of compulsion, and recipients may disregard the advice, providing that in so doing they do not disregard the law.

On 9 August 2004 the Home Office issued Circular 46/2004. It is entitled The Police Pension Scheme - Police Medical Appeal Boards/Role of Selected Medical Practitioner/British Transport Police Transfers.

The originating Department at the Home Office was the Police Personnel Unit within the Crime Reduction and Community Safety Group. It was issued by a civil servant, John Gilbert, who was then the Head of the Police Pensions and Retirement Policy Section.

The Home Secretary at the time (8 June 2001 – 15 December 2004) was David Blunkett . The Minister of State for Crime Reduction, Policing, Community Safety and Counter-Terrorism at the time (2003–2005) was Hazel Blears.

Home Office circular 46/2004 was addressed to Chief Police Officers in England and Wales, with copies to the Clerks to the Police Authorities.

== Annex C ==
Annex C to the guidance is entitled, Home Office Guidance For Forces on Reviews of Injury Awards.

The introduction to Annex C states:

This Guidance is being issued to help ensure a fairer, more cohesive approach to the payment of injury benefits to ill-health retired officers who have reached the compulsory retirement age with their Force. A recent survey found that practice in this area was diverse. Some forces automatically reduced degree of disablement benefits to the lowest banding when this age had been reached - others continued to pay benefits at the same rate until the death of the Officer concerned. It is clear that a more standardised approach is needed to safeguard the rights of the Officer and ensure fair treatment across Forces.

The guidance went on to advise:

Review of Injury Pensions once Officers reach Compulsory Retirement Age

Once a former officer receiving an injury pension reaches what would have been his compulsory retirement age under the Police Pensions Regulations (55, 57, 60 or 65 depending on the person’s force and rank at the point of leaving the police service) the force should consider a review of the award payable, since it is no longer appropriate to use the former officer’s police pay scale as the basis for his or her pre-injury earning capacity.

In the absence of a cogent reason for a higher or lower outside earnings level, it is suggested that the new basis for the person’s earning capacity, had there been no injury, should be the National Average Earnings (NAE) at the time of the review. The NAE figure taken should be the average for the population overall. Separate figures for males and females, and regional fluctuations should not be considered. The loss of earning capacity for the purpose of establishing Degree of Disablement should therefore be assessed by reference to the % proportion the person’s actual earning capacity bears to NAE.

This procedure should help to ensure that former officers are treated in a consistent way across forces. They will be placed on an equal financial footing with others in the employment market at a time when they could not have been assumed to be earning a police salary.

After a review at compulsory retirement age a force should determine the need and date for the next review. In some cases there may be particular circumstances which make it undesirable to conduct a further review.

Review of Injury Pensions once Officers reach Age 65

Once a former officer receiving an injury pension reaches the age of 65 they will have reached their State Pension Age irrespective of whether they are male or female. The force then has the discretion, in the absence of a cogent reason otherwise, to advise the SMP to place the former officer in the lowest band of Degree of Disablement. At such a point the former officer would normally no longer be expected to be earning a salary in the employment market.
A review at age 65 will normally be the last unless there are exceptional circumstances which require there to be a further review.

== Reaction ==
Around 17 of the 43 police forces in England and Wales began to implement the guidance from the circular when conducting reviews of police injury pensions.

Doubts were raised concerning the validity of the Home Office guidance by The National Association of Retired Police Officers (NARPO) and other organisations and individuals.

In 2005 134 Members of Parliament signed early day motion no. 1102 - Police Injury Retirement Pensions.

The motion stated:

That this House notes that a number of retired police officers who have been receiving injury awards face having those awards cut when they reach statutory retirement age; further notes that many of those officers believed that the awards would be paid to them for life; further notes that awards of this kind were normally made to officers injured while engaged in protecting the interests of the public; and calls on the Government to investigate whether officers have been misled about the rules that would apply to their awards.

A number of cases were successfully brought before the Administrative Court by former police officers who believed that their injury pensions had been unlawfully reduced under the influence of the Home Office guidance. Other former officers successfully took their cases to the Pensions Ombudsman or won a restoration of their pension by appeal to a Police Medical Appeal Board.

On 11 September 2009 the then Minister of State for Security, Counter-Terrorism, Crime and Policing, David Hanson announced at the annual conference of the National Association of Retired Police Officers (NARPO) that he had ordered a review of the guidance.

Eric Evans the President of NARPO said,

We are pleased to see that the Minister appears to accept that the Home Office Circular 46/2004 is in need of amendment. Our view is that the circular and pressure from the Home Office has created a situation where some forces are guilty of maladministration of the injury benefit system to the detriment of significant numbers of our members. We have been working hard to get this view across to the Home Office. We are very pleased to accept the Minister's offer of a meeting to discuss this issue and others of interest to our members in the very near future.

The promised review did not appear and on 10 March 2010 John Gilbert, Head of the Police Pensions Section at the Home Office wrote to all Chief Officers of Police and all Chairs of Police Authorities in England and Wales. He reported,

Good progress has been made on the review of this guidance and it is intended that this should result in revised and expanded guidance being produced in due course. However further development of revised guidance is currently constrained by the fact that a legal issue which is central to the final shape the guidance will take, is currently awaiting the decision of the Court of Appeal.

Mr. Gilbert advised that any planned reviews should be deferred until the Court had announced its decision.

== Relevant Cases ==
The case Mr. Gilbert referenced but did not name was that of Belinda LAWS, a former Metropolitan Police officer who is in receipt of an injury pension. It is referenced as Neutral Citation No. [2009] EWHC 1867 (Admin) CO/10892/2009. She successfully challenged the decision of the Police Medical Appeal Board, dated 17 March 2009, to reject her appeal against a decision of the Selected Medical Practitioner, that her degree of disablement for the purposes of her police injury pension should be reduced from 85 per cent to 25 per cent. The case was first heard on 12 November 2009 at the High Court of Justice before the Administrative Court, Queens Bench Division, Mrs Justice Cox presiding. The decision was upheld at appeal on 13 October 2010.

The case of CROCKER was heard in 2003 (Thus pre-dating issue of HOC 46/2004). It is referenced as Neutral Citation Number [2003] EWHC 3115 (Admin) CO/505/2003. The brief background is that the claimant, the South Wales Police Authority, sought to quash a decision of the defendant Medical Referee that Mr Crocker the interested party, a police officer who was retired on 3 March 2002, had lost all earning capacity as a result of an injury received in the execution of his duty. Mr Crocker won his case.

The case of POLLARD was heard in February 2009. It is referenced as Neutral Citation No. [2009] EWHC 403 (Admin) CO/853/2008. The brief background is that Barbara Pollard, a former West Yorkshire police officer, successfully sought an order quashing the decision made by a Police Medical Appeal Board which held that her degree of disablement was assessed at nil per cent as her current disability was not causally related to the index incident in 1974.

The case of TURNER was held in July 2009. It is referenced as Neutral Citation No. [2009] EWHC 403 (Admin) CO/853/2008. The brief background is that the claimant, Stephen Turner, a former officer with the Metropolitan Police had his injury pension reviewed in October 2007. The Selected Medical Practitioner did a new review of the jobs she felt Mr Turner could do and decided to reduce Mr Turner's injury pension from Band 2 to Band 1. He successfully brought the issue to judicial review.

The Pension Ombudsman made a determination in the case of AYRE in August 2009. Mr. Ayre is a former Humberside officer and his injury pension was reviewed under the Home Office guidance inspired 'age 65' concept that the pension could be reduced to band one simply because a pensioner had reached state retirement age. The Ombudsman determined, . . . Mr Ayre is right when he says that the Guidance cannot override the relevant Regulations. Mr Ayre won his case and Humberside Police Authority was directed to reconsider its decision, taking into account the Ombudsman's comments.

The case of CRUDACE was held in January 2012. It is referenced as Neutral Citation No. (2012) EWHC 112 (Admin) CO/2417/2011. Judge Behrens released a judgement quashing the decision of the Northumbria police to reduce Mr Crudace's pension when the former Inspector reached the age of 65. He decided the Home Office guidance was unlawful because it was inconsistent with the statutory scheme under which the pensions were paid. Judge Behrens also confirmed former police officers who have had their pensions reduced in this way are entitled to apply to the police authority for the decisions to be reversed and for their pensions to be restored.

The case of SIMPSON was held in February 2012. It is referenced as Neutral Citation No. (2012) EWHC 808 (Admin) CO/475/2011. Judge Supperstone held that part of the Home Office guidance contained in circular 46/2004 was unlawful, as was similar guidance contained in Part 5 of the Home Office's Guidance on Medical Appeals.

At Paragraph 42 of the decision Mr Justice Supperstone opined:

'In my judgment, the appropriate relief to grant in the circumstances of this case is a declaration that the section in the Guidance headed "Review of Injury Pensions Once Officers Reach Age 65" and paragraph 20 of the Guidance on Medical Appeals are inconsistent with the Regulations and unlawful. There is no justification for adopting a different approach to regulation 37(1) in respect of a former officer who reaches the age of 65 than in the case of a review for former officers of a younger age.'

The Home Office has since released circular 007/2012 which advises recipients that parts of the guidance on police injury award reviews, as specified below, are cancelled. The relevant parts are:

(i) Home Office Circular 46/2004: in Annex C the section entitled 'Review of injury pensions once officers reach age 65'

(ii) Guidance on medical appeals: paragraph 20 of section 5, entitled 'Degree of disablement after age 65'

The Home Office Policing Directorate wrote to all Chief Constables and Police and Crime Commissioners in February 2014 advising withdrawal of Annex C of Home Office circular 46/2004.

The letter stated: The case of Simpson (2012) found that the part of Home Office Circular 46/2004 dealing with reviews of injury benefit at state pension age (SPA) was unlawful. The section of the guidance was withdrawn by Home Office Circular 007/2012. A further section of the guidance, relating to reviews at compulsory retirement age (CRA), was not explicitly withdrawn at that point.

An application for a judicial review has recently been made claiming that a further section of Circular 46/2004 in respect of CRA is also unlawful. It is clear the judgement in the SImpson case would apply to CRA as well as SPA and the Home Office has undertaken to withdraw Annex C of Home Office Circular 46/2004. This has been publicised on the Home Office website and this letter is formal notification to you of the withdrawal of Annex C of Home Office Circular 46/2004. The Home Office is also withdrawing paragraphs 17, 18 and 19 of Guidance on Medical Appeals which refer to CRA.

== Current Situation ==
To date no revised guidance has been issued. Reviews of police injury pensions remain mostly suspended. Mr Peter Spreadbury, Head of the Police Pensions and Retirement Policy Section within the Home Office, gave evidence in the Simpson case and stated, "Should it appear that repeated legal challenges and uncertainty are likely to continue in this area, one possible option is the withdrawal of the relevant guidance and the abandonment of any attempt to give central guidance on the topic."
