= 2004 in British radio =

This is a list of events in British radio during 2004.

== Events ==
=== January ===
- 1 January – Ofcom takes over the regulation of British radio from The Radio Authority.
- 5 January –
  - Lesley Douglas succeeds James Moir as Controller of Radio 2 and BBC 6 Music.
  - Chris Moyles takes over the breakfast show on BBC Radio 1.
  - Nick Ferrari takes over the breakfast show on LBC.
- 6 January – The BBC announces that veteran broadcaster Barbara Sturgeon will leave Radio Kent at the end of the month to pursue other projects after two decades at the station.
- 19 January – Launch of Radio Today, an online radio industry magazine edited by Roy Martin.

=== February ===
- 10 February – Dave Lincoln, a well-known radio personality in Northwest England, and former Radio 1 presenter Andy Peebles will head the line-up when 100.4 Jazz FM is relaunched as 100.4 Smooth FM in March.
- 12 February – 100.7 Heart FM presenter Tushar Makwana dies in hospital following a hit-and-run incident during a botched robbery attempt at his home in Birmingham a few days earlier. Four teenagers are later convicted of his murder and given 10-year jail terms.
- 20 February – BBC Radio 4 airs the final Letter from America less than six weeks before the death of its presenter Alistair Cooke. The weekly 15-minute programme has run for 2,869 shows from 24 March 1946, making it the longest-running speech radio programme in history.

=== March ===
- 1 March –
  - Johnnie Walker returns to his Radio 2 drivetime show following a nine-month break while he received treatment for cancer.
  - 100.4 Jazz FM is relaunched as 100.4 Smooth FM.
- 26 March – Mark and Lard (Mark Radcliffe and Marc Riley) present their final show on BBC Radio 1 after 11 years and one failed eight-month stint on the Radio 1 Breakfast Show.

=== April ===
- 2 April – Chris Tarrant presents his final Breakfast show on London's 95.8 Capital FM after 17 years in the chair. He is succeeded by Johnny Vaughan.
- 10–17 April – Pirate BBC Essex broadcasts for the first time. Commemorating the 40th anniversary of the launch of Radio Caroline, it broadcasts on the MW frequencies of BBC Essex. This is repeated in 2007, 2009 and 2017.

=== May ===
- May – Saga 105.7FM presenter Brendan Kearney is dismissed from the station for using an office computer to access pornography. The incident had occurred at BBC Radio Cleveland where Kearney was the breakfast show presenter. Managers reprimanded him, and after he quit the station alerted Saga who initially suspended him while an investigation was conducted.

=== June ===
- 6 June – Simon Hirst and Katy Hill become co-hosts of the national commercial chart show Hit40uk taking over from 'Doctor' Neil Fox
- 7 June – Scott Mills takes over as presenter of the drivetime show on BBC Radio 1.
- 23 June – DJ Tony Blackburn is suspended by radio station Classic Gold Digital for playing songs by Cliff Richard, against station policy.

=== July ===
- No events.

=== August ===
- 28 August – Pick of the Pops ends on BBC Radio 2 although bank holiday editions of the show continue to be broadcast.

=== September ===
- 20 September – Mark Damazer succeeds Helen Boaden as controller of BBC Radio 4.

=== October ===
- Undated in October – Carrie Prideaux joins Radio 1, and starts reading her first ever Newsbeat sports bulletins for The Chris Moyles Show.
- 6 October – BBC Radio 4 premieres the comedy About a Dog based on a proposal by Debbie Barham (died 2003) and starring Alan Davies in the title role (sic.).

=== November ===
- No events.

=== December ===
- 31 December – Radio 4's Woman's Hour becomes Man's Hour for one day only, on which it is presented by Channel 4 News anchor Jon Snow.
- Undated in December – Les Ross leaves Birmingham's Saga 105.7 FM following differences with station bosses. He claims the station management was guilty of sending "nannying" e-mails which were turning him into a "robo-jock".

== Station debuts ==
- 1 March – 100.4 Smooth FM
- 4 April – High Peak Radio
- 1 May – KMFM Extra
- 10 June – Kerrang! 105.2
- 13 June – 97.1 Radio Carmarthenshire
- 14 July – 97.5 Scarlet FM
- 7 September – Saga 105.2 FM

== Programme debuts ==
- 5 January – The Chris Moyles Show on BBC Radio 1 (2004–2012)
- 19 February – Mitch Benn's Crimes Against Music on BBC Radio 4 (2004–2006)
- 5 July – Jane Gazzo's Dream Ticket on BBC 6 Music (2004–2005)
- 29 July – Annie Mac on BBC Radio 1 (2004–2021)
- 20 August – Trevor's World of Sport on BBC Radio 4 (2004–2007)
- 6 September – Elaine Paige on Sunday on BBC Radio 2 (2004–Present)
- 6 October – About a Dog on BBC Radio 4 (2004–2007)

== Continuing radio programmes ==
=== 1940s ===
- Sunday Half Hour (1940–2018)
- Desert Island Discs (1942–Present)
- Woman's Hour (1946–Present)
- A Book at Bedtime (1949–Present)

=== 1950s ===
- The Archers (1950–Present)
- The Today Programme (1957–Present)
- Your Hundred Best Tunes (1959–2007)

=== 1960s ===
- Farming Today (1960–Present)
- In Touch (1961–Present)
- The World at One (1965–Present)
- The Official Chart (1967–Present)
- Just a Minute (1967–Present)
- The Living World (1968–Present)
- The Organist Entertains (1969–2018)

=== 1970s ===
- PM (1970–Present)
- Start the Week (1970–Present)
- You and Yours (1970–Present)
- I'm Sorry I Haven't a Clue (1972–Present)
- Good Morning Scotland (1973–Present)
- Newsbeat (1973–Present)
- File on 4 (1977–Present)
- Money Box (1977–Present)
- The News Quiz (1977–Present)
- Feedback (1979–Present)
- The Food Programme (1979–Present)
- Science in Action (1979–Present)

=== 1980s ===
- Steve Wright in the Afternoon (1981–1993, 1999–2022)
- In Business (1983–Present)
- Sounds of the 60s (1983–Present)
- Loose Ends (1986–Present)

=== 1990s ===
- The Moral Maze (1990–Present)
- Essential Selection (1991–Present)
- No Commitments (1992–2007)
- Wake Up to Wogan (1993–2009)
- Essential Mix (1993–Present)
- Up All Night (1994–Present)
- Wake Up to Money (1994–Present)
- Private Passions (1995–Present)
- Parkinson's Sunday Supplement (1996–2007)
- The David Jacobs Collection (1996–2013)
- Westway (1997–2005)
- Puzzle Panel (1998–2005)
- Drivetime with Johnnie Walker (1998–2006)
- Sunday Night at 10 (1998–2013)
- In Our Time (1998–Present)
- Material World (1998–Present)
- Scott Mills (1998–2022)
- The Now Show (1998–Present)
- It's Been a Bad Week (1999–2006)
- Jonathan Ross (1999–2010)

=== 2000s ===
- Dead Ringers (2000–2007, 2014–Present)
- BBC Radio 2 Folk Awards (2000–Present)
- Sounds of the 70s (2000–2008, 2009–Present)
- Big John @ Breakfast (2000–Present)
- Think the Unthinkable (2001–2005)
- Parsons and Naylor's Pull-Out Sections (2001–2007)
- Jammin' (2001–2008)
- Go4It (2001–2009)
- The Jo Whiley Show (2001–2011)
- Kermode and Mayo's Film Review (2001–2022)
- The Big Toe Radio Show (2002–2011)
- A Kist o Wurds (2002–Present)
- Whispers (2003–2005)
- The Day the Music Died (2003–2007)
- Fighting Talk (2003–Present)
- Jeremy Vine (2003–Present)

== Ending this year ==
- 3 February – Concrete Cow (2002–2004)
- 6 February – Ring Around the Bath (2003–2004)
- 20 February – Letter from America (1946–2004)
- 24 May – Elephants to Catch Eels (2003–2004)
- 1 July – The Dream Ticket with Janice Long (2002–2004)
- 29 September – The 99p Challenge (1998–2004)

== Closing this year ==
- 13 February – 100.4 Jazz FM (1994–2004)

== Deaths ==
- 12 February – Tushar Makwana, 37, award-winning Birmingham based radio presenter
- 29 March – Hubert Gregg, 89, BBC broadcaster
- 30 March – Alistair Cooke, 95, English-born journalist, television personality and broadcaster, longtime presenter of Letter from America
- 13 April – Caron Keating, 41, radio and television presenter
- 3 July – Jimmy Mack, 70, Scottish radio personality
- 25 October – John Peel, 65, broadcaster and journalist
- 27 November – John Dunn, 70, broadcaster
- 28 November – Molly Weir, 94, Scottish broadcast actress
- 26 December – Garard Green, 80 actor
