= Tushar Makwana =

British radio personality (1967–2004)

- Born: Tushar Mulji Makwana; 2 February 1967; Jinja, Uganda
- Died: 12 February 2004 (aged 37); Castle Bromwich, Solihull, England
- Cause of death: Manslaughter
- Occupation: Radio presenter
- Employer: 100.7 Heart FM
- Spouse: Deepika Parmar (m. 1994)

Tushar Mulji Makwana (2 February 1967 – 12 February 2004) was a British radio personality of Indian descent. He was killed in a hit-and-run incident during a botched robbery attempt at his home in Solihull, England.

== Early life ==
The youngest of three children, Makwana was born in Jinja, Uganda, of Gujarati Indian descent. His family moved to Britain when he was four years old after they and many other Asians were forced out of Uganda under Idi Amin's regime.

Interested in radio from a young age, Makwana ran a mobile disco as a teen and helped teach other youngsters about broadcasting. His first experience of broadcasting was as a volunteer at Walsall Hospital Radio, where he once held the position of chairman. Makwana worked in banking before beginning his radio career.

== Radio career ==
Makwana became involved in professional radio whilst working at a credit analyst in London. Working first at Radio Brockley in Stanmore and then at Radio Northwick Park in Harrow. He also worked at Walsall Hospital Radio presenting their Friday late show and also held the committee position of Presentation Training Officer. Makwana quickly progressed and he soon left Radio Northwick Park to work for AA Roadwatch providing travel bulletins for the BBC.

In 1997 Makwana moved to 100.7 Heart FM to present a variety of different shows on Saturday evenings and Sunday mornings using just his christian name as his on air brand. He also presented the hugely popular "Kick up the 80s". In 2002 Tushar won a Silver Award at the Sony Radio Academy Awards for a show he had presented about UB40.

== Death ==
At approximately 4.20 am on 9 February 2004, a group of teenagers broke into Makwana's house at Wasperton Close in Castle Bromwich, Solihull in an effort to steal the keys to his BMW parked outside. Makwana confronted the intruders, chasing them out of the house, but was knocked down by their getaway car and suffered serious head injuries. He was taken by ambulance to Heartlands Hospital and was later transferred to the Queen Elizabeth Hospital where his wife, Deepika, began a bedside vigil. Makwana's severe injuries resulted in the decision to turn off his life support system was made on 12 February. His funeral was held on 25 March. Birmingham Coroner Aidan Cotter praised his family for allowing his organs to be donated.

Following a trial at Leicester Crown Court in December 2004, Brett Frewin, Matthew Jeffrey, Michael McGuire and Ashley Cooksey were convicted of Makwana's manslaughter and jailed for ten years.

On the tenth anniversary of his death, friends and colleagues, including Heart Breakfast presenter Ed James and his BBC Radio WM counterpart Pete Morgan, paid tribute to Makwana.
