= List of acts of the Parliament of the United Kingdom from 1937 =

This is a complete list of acts of the Parliament of the United Kingdom for the year 1937.

Note that the first parliament of the United Kingdom was held in 1801; parliaments between 1707 and 1800 were either parliaments of Great Britain or of Ireland). For acts passed up until 1707, see the list of acts of the Parliament of England and the list of acts of the Parliament of Scotland. For acts passed from 1707 to 1800, see the list of acts of the Parliament of Great Britain. See also the list of acts of the Parliament of Ireland.

For acts of the devolved parliaments and assemblies in the United Kingdom, see the list of acts of the Scottish Parliament, the list of acts of the Northern Ireland Assembly, and the list of acts and measures of Senedd Cymru; see also the list of acts of the Parliament of Northern Ireland.

The number shown after each act's title is its chapter number. Acts passed before 1963 are cited using this number, preceded by the year(s) of the reign during which the relevant parliamentary session was held; thus the Union with Ireland Act 1800 is cited as "39 & 40 Geo. 3 c. 67", meaning the 67th act passed during the session that started in the 39th year of the reign of George III and which finished in the 40th year of that reign. Note that the modern convention is to use Arabic numerals in citations (thus "41 Geo. 3" rather than "41 Geo. III"). Acts of the last session of the Parliament of Great Britain and the first session of the Parliament of the United Kingdom are both cited as "41 Geo. 3". Acts passed from 1963 onwards are simply cited by calendar year and chapter number.

== 1 Edw. 8 & 1 Geo. 6 ==
Continuing the second session of the 37th Parliament of the United Kingdom, which met from 3 November 1936 until 22 October 1937.

This session was also traditionally cited as 1 Ed. 8 & 1 Geo. 6, 1 Ed. 8 & 1 G. 6 or 1 E. 8 & 1 G. 6.

=== Public general acts ===
Short title	Citation	Royal assent
Long title
Consolidated Fund (No. 1) Act 1937 (repealed)	1 Edw. 8 & 1 Geo. 6. c. 7	18 February 1937
An Act to apply a sum out of the Consolidated Fund to the service of the year ending on the thirty-first day of March, one thousand nine hundred and thirty-seven. (Repealed by Statute Law Revision Act 1950 (14 Geo. 6. c. 6))
Beef and Veal Customs Duties Act 1937 (repealed)	1 Edw. 8 & 1 Geo. 6. c. 8	18 February 1937
An Act to provide for charging duties of customs on beef and veal and on extracts and essences of beef or veal, and for purposes connected with the matter aforesaid. (Repealed by Import Duties Act 1958 (6 & 7 Eliz. 2. c. 6))
India and Burma (Existing Laws) Act 1937 (repealed)	1 Edw. 8 & 1 Geo. 6. c. 9	18 February 1937
An Act to explain and amend sections two hundred and ninety-two and two hundred and ninety-three of the Government of India Act, 1935, (Note: Government of India Act 1935 (26 Geo. 5 & 1 Edw. 8. c. 2)) and sections one hundred and forty-eight and one hundred and forty-nine of the Government of Burma Act, 1935. (Note: Government of Burma Act 1935 (26 Geo. 5 & 1 Edw. 8. c. 3)) (Repealed by Statute Law (Repeals) Act 1976 (c. 16))
Unemployment Assistance (Temporary Provisions) (Amendment) Act 1937 (repealed)	1 Edw. 8 & 1 Geo. 6. c. 10	18 February 1937
An Act to extend, until the thirty-first day of March nineteen hundred and thirty-seven, the period in respect of which grants are to be paid to local authorities out of moneys provided by Parliament under section one of the Unemployment Assistance (Temporary Provisions) (No. 2) Act, 1935; (Note: Unemployment Assistance (Temporary Provisions) (No. 2) Act 1935 (25 & 26 Geo. 5. c. 22)) to provide for the adjustment of such grants between local authorities; and to amend section forty-five of the Unemployment Assistance Act, 1934. (Note: Unemployment Act 1934 (24 & 25 Geo. 5. c. 29)) (Repealed by Statute Law Revision Act 1950 (14 Geo. 6. c. 6))
Public Works Loans Act 1937 (repealed)	1 Edw. 8 & 1 Geo. 6. c. 11	18 February 1937
An Act to grant money for the purpose of certain local loans out of the Local Loans Fund, and for other purposes relating to local loans. (Repealed by Statute Law Revision Act 1950 (14 Geo. 6. c. 6))
Firearms Act 1937 (repealed)	1 Edw. 8 & 1 Geo. 6. c. 12	18 February 1937
An Act to consolidate the provisions of the Firearms Acts, 1920 to 1936, relating to firearms, imitation firearms and other weapons and to ammunition. (Repealed by Firearms Act 1968 (c. 27))
Defence Loans Act 1937 (repealed)	1 Edw. 8 & 1 Geo. 6. c. 13	19 March 1937
An Act to provide money for the defence services, and for purposes connected therewith. (Repealed by Statute Law Revision Act 1964 (c. 79))
East India Loans Act 1937 (repealed)	1 Edw. 8 & 1 Geo. 6. c. 14	19 March 1937
An Act to authorise the Secretary of State to borrow in sterling on behalf of the Governor-General of India in Council during the period with respect to which Part XIII of the Government of India Act, 1935, applies; to repeal and reproduce with modifications and adaptations enactments relating to certain financial obligations of the Secretary of State in Council of India, and otherwise to amend the law in relation to certain of those obligations; and for purposes connected with the matters aforesaid. (Repealed by Statute Law (Repeals) Act 1993 (c. 50))
Geneva Convention Act 1937 (repealed)	1 Edw. 8 & 1 Geo. 6. c. 15	19 March 1937
An Act to enable effect to be given to Article twenty-eight of the International Convention for the amelioration of the condition of the wounded and sick in armies in the field done at Geneva on the twenty-seventh day of July, nineteen hundred and twenty-nine, and for purposes connected therewith. (Repealed by Geneva Conventions Act 1957 (5 & 6 Eliz. 2. c. 52))
Regency Act 1937	1 Edw. 8 & 1 Geo. 6. c. 16	19 March 1937
An Act to make provision for a Regency in the event of the Sovereign being on His Accession under the age of eighteen years, and in the event of the incapacity of the Sovereign through illness, and for the performance of certain of the royal functions in the name and on behalf of the Sovereign in certain other events; to repeal the Lords Justices Act, 1837; (Note: Lords Justices Act 1837 (7 Will. 4 & 1 Vict. c. 72)) and for purposes connected with the matters aforesaid.
Reserve Forces Act 1937 (repealed)	1 Edw. 8 & 1 Geo. 6. c. 17	19 March 1937
An Act to amend section one of the Reserve Forces and Militia Act, 1898, (Note: Reserve Forces and Militia Act 1898 (61 & 62 Vict. c. 9)) by extending the period of liability to be called out on permanent service thereunder. (Repealed by Auxiliary and Reserve Forces Act 1949 (12, 13 & 14 Geo. 6. c. 96) and Army Reserve Act 1950 (14 Geo. 6. c. 32))
Empire Settlement Act 1937 (repealed)	1 Edw. 8 & 1 Geo. 6. c. 18	19 March 1937
An Act to amend the Empire Settlement Act, 1922. (Note: Empire Settlement Act 1922 (12 & 13 Geo. 5. c. 13)) (Repealed by Statute Law (Repeals) Act 1976 (c. 16))
Merchant Shipping (Spanish Frontiers Observation) Act 1937 (repealed)	1 Edw. 8 & 1 Geo. 6. c. 19	19 March 1937
An Act to amend the law relating to merchant shipping for the purpose of enabling effect to be given to an international agreement for establishing a system of observation of the Spanish frontiers. (Repealed by Statute Law Revision Act 1950 (14 Geo. 6. c. 6))
Consolidated Fund (No. 2) Act 1937 (repealed)	1 Edw. 8 & 1 Geo. 6. c. 20	25 March 1937
An Act to apply certain sums out of the Consolidated Fund to the service of the years ending on the thirty-first day of March, one thousand nine hundred and thirty-six, one thousand nine hundred and thirty-seven, and one thousand nine hundred and thirty-eight. (Repealed by Statute Law Revision Act 1950 (14 Geo. 6. c. 6))
British Shipping (Continuance of Subsidy) Act 1937 (repealed)	1 Edw. 8 & 1 Geo. 6. c. 21	25 March 1937
An Act to extend by twelve months the period in respect of which subsidies are payable under Part I of the British Shipping (Assistance) Act, 1935, (Note: British Shipping (Assistance) Act 1935 (25 & 26 Geo. 5. c. 7)) as amended by the British Shipping (Continuance of Subsidy) Act, 1936, (Note: British Shipping (Continuance of Subsidy) Act 1936 (26 Geo. 5 & 1 Edw. 8. c. 12)) and to provide for the payment of such subsidies and of the expenses of the Board of Trade under the said Part I, in respect of the year nineteen hundred and thirty-seven, out of moneys provided by Parliament. (Repealed by Statute Law Revision Act 1950 (14 Geo. 6. c. 6))
Local Government (Financial Provisions) Act 1937 (repealed)	1 Edw. 8 & 1 Geo. 6. c. 22	25 March 1937
An Act to amend Part VI of the Local Government Act, 1929; (Note: Local Government Act 1929 (19 & 20 Geo. 5. c. 17)) and to repeal section forty-five of the Unemployment Assistance Act, 1934, and the proviso to paragraph (c) of subsection (2) of section nine of the Rating and Valuation Act, 1925. (Note: Rating and Valuation Act 1925 (15 & 16 Geo. 5. c. 90)) (Repealed by Local Government Act 1948 (11 & 12 Geo. 6. c. 26))
Merchant Shipping Act 1937 (repealed)	1 Edw. 8 & 1 Geo. 6. c. 23	25 March 1937
An Act to make further provision to the submergence of load lines and as to the life-saving appliances of fishing boats. (Repealed by Merchant Shipping (Load Lines) Act 1967 (c. 27))
National Health Insurance Act (Amendment) Act 1937 (repealed)	1 Edw. 8 & 1 Geo. 6. c. 24	25 March 1937
An Act to amend the description of the persons with whom arrangements may be made under the National Health Insurance Act, 1936, (Note: National Health Insurance Act 1936 (26 Geo. 5 & 1 Edw. 8. c. 32)) for the dispensing of medicines. (Repealed by National Insurance Act 1946 (9 & 10 Geo. 6. c. 67))
Education (Deaf Children) Act 1937 (repealed)	1 Edw. 8 & 1 Geo. 6. c. 25	29 April 1937
An Act to lower the age at which the period of compulsory education begins in the case of deaf children. (Repealed by Education Act 1944 (7 & 8 Geo. 6. c. 31))
Army and Air Force (Annual) Act 1937 (repealed)	1 Edw. 8 & 1 Geo. 6. c. 26	29 April 1937
An Act to provide, during Twelve Months, for the Discipline and Regulation of the Army and the Air Force. (Repealed by Statute Law Revision Act 1950 (14 Geo. 6. c. 6) and Revision of the Army and Air Force Acts (Transitional Provisions) Act 1955 (3 & 4 Eliz. 2. c. 20))
County Councils Association Expenses (Amendment) Act 1937 (repealed)	1 Edw. 8 & 1 Geo. 6. c. 27	6 May 1937
An Act to authorise an increase in the amount of certain payments by County Councils to the County Councils Association. (Repealed by Statute Law Revision Act 1950 (14 Geo. 6. c. 6))
Harbours, Piers and Ferries (Scotland) Act 1937	1 Edw. 8 & 1 Geo. 6. c. 28	6 May 1937
An Act to make provision for the acquisition and construction by local authorities of harbours, piers, ferries and boatslips in Scotland, for the construction of new works connected therewith, and for the fixing and revision of dues thereat, and at certain inland navigation undertakings, and for other purposes relating to the matters aforesaid.
Local Government (Financial Provisions) (Scotland) Act 1937 (repealed)	1 Edw. 8 & 1 Geo. 6. c. 29	6 May 1937
An Act to amend Part III of the Local Government (Scotland) Act, 1929, (Note: Local Government (Scotland) Act 1929 (19 & 20 Geo. 5. c. 25)) and to repeal, so far as relating to Scotland, section forty-five of the Unemployment Assistance Act, 1934. (Repealed by Local Government Act 1948 (11 & 12 Geo. 6. c. 26))
Maternity Services (Scotland) Act 1937 (repealed)	1 Edw. 8 & 1 Geo. 6. c. 30	6 May 1937
An Act to make further provision with respect to maternity services in Scotland, to amend the Midwives (Scotland) Act, 1915, (Note: Midwives (Scotland) Act 1915 (5 & 6 Geo. 5. c. 91)) and to provide for the combination of local authorities for certain purposes under the Notification of Births (Extension) Act, 1915. (Note: Notification of Births (Extension) Act 1915 (5 & 6 Geo. 5. c. 64)) (Repealed by Midwives (Scotland) Act 1951 (14 & 15 Geo. 6. c. 54))
Special Areas (Amendment) Act 1937 (repealed)	1 Edw. 8 & 1 Geo. 6. c. 31	6 May 1937
An Act to continue until the thirty-first day of March, nineteen hundred and thirty-nine, the Special Areas (Development and Improvement) Act, 1934, (Note: Special Areas (Development and Improvement) Act 1934 (25 & 26 Geo. 5. c. 1)) and to enable further assistance to be given to the areas specified in the First Schedule to that Act, and to certain other areas. (Repealed by Distribution of Industry Act 1945 (8 & 9 Geo. 6. c. 36))
Civil List Act 1937 (repealed)	1 Edw. 8 & 1 Geo. 6. c. 32	10 June 1937
An Act to make provision for the honour and dignity of the Crown and the Royal Family, and for the payment of certain allowances and pensions; to enable His Majesty to assent to arrangements on behalf of any son of His Majesty being Duke of Cornwall for the payment of certain sums out of the revenues of the Duchy during the minority of the said Duke; and for purposes connected with the matters aforesaid. (Repealed by Sovereign Grant Act 2011 (c. 15))
Diseases of Fish Act 1937 (repealed)	1 Edw. 8 & 1 Geo. 6. c. 33	10 June 1937
An Act to prevent the spreading of disease among salmon and freshwater fish in Great Britain. (Repealed for England and Wales by Aquatic Animal Health (England and Wales) Regulations 2009 (SI 2009/463) and for Scotland by Aquatic Animal Health (Scotland) Regulations 2009 (SSI 2009/85))
Sheep Stocks Valuation (Scotland) Act 1937 (repealed)	1 Edw. 8 & 1 Geo. 6. c. 34	10 June 1937
An Act to amend the law with respect to valuations of sheep stock in Scotland. (Repealed by Agricultural Holdings (Scotland) Act 1991 (c. 55))
Statutory Salaries Act 1937 (repealed)	1 Edw. 8 & 1 Geo. 6. c. 35	1 July 1937
An Act to make further provision as to the amount of the salaries payable in respect of certain offices; and to make consequential amendments in the enactments relating thereto. (Repealed by Reorganisation of Offices (Scotland) Act 1939 (2 & 3 Geo. 6. c. 20), Judicial Offices (Salaries, &c.) Act 1952 (15 & 16 Geo. 6 & 1 Eliz. 2. c. 12), Statute Law Revision Act 1953 (2 & 3 Eliz. 2. c. 5), Supreme Court Officers (Pensions) Act 1954 (2 & 3 Eliz. 2. c. 38), Crown Estate Act 1956 (4 & 5 Eliz. 2. c. 73), Crown Estate Act 1961 (9 & 10 Eliz. 2. c. 55), Statute Law Revision Act 1963 (c. 30) and Minister for the Civil Service Order 1971 (SI 1971/2099))
Local Government (Members' Travelling Expenses) Act 1937 (repealed)	1 Edw. 8 & 1 Geo. 6. c. 36	1 July 1937
An Act to make provision for the payment of the travelling expenses incurred by persons in discharging their duties in connection with assessment and other committees. (Repealed by Local Government Act 1948 (11 & 12 Geo. 6. c. 26))
Children and Young Persons (Scotland) Act 1937	1 Edw. 8 & 1 Geo. 6. c. 37	1 July 1937
An Act to consolidate in their application to Scotland certain enactments relating to persons under the age of eighteen years. (Repealed for the Isle of Man by Statute Law (Repeals) Act 2004 (c. 14))
Ministers of the Crown Act 1937 (repealed)	1 Edw. 8 & 1 Geo. 6. c. 38	1 July 1937
An Act to regulate the salaries payable in respect of certain Administrative Offices of State; to provide for the payment of additional salaries to members of the Cabinet holding offices at salaries less than five thousand pounds a year, of a salary to any person being Prime Minister, of pensions to persons who have been Prime Minister, and of a salary to any person being Leader of the Opposition; to simplify the law as to the capacity of persons holding offices of profit to sit and vote in Parliament; and for purposes connected with the matters aforesaid. (Repealed by Ministerial Salaries Consolidation Act 1965 (c. 58))
Widows', Orphans' and Old Age Contributory Pensions (Voluntary Contributors) Act 1937 (repealed)	1 Edw. 8 & 1 Geo. 6. c. 39	1 July 1937
An Act to extend the classes of persons who can become insured as voluntary contributors for the purposes of widows', orphans' and old age contributory pensions, and otherwise to amend, in relation to voluntary contributors and women engaged in certain excepted employments, the enactments relating to such pensions and to health insurance, to amend section thirty of the Widows', Orphans' and Old Age Contributory Pensions Act, 1936, (Note: Widows', Orphans' and Old Age Contributory Pensions Act 1936 (26 Geo. 5 & 1 Edw. 8. c. 33)) and section four of the Northern Ireland (Miscellaneous Provisions) Act, 1932, (Note: Northern Ireland (Miscellaneous Provisions) Act 1932 (22 & 23 Geo. 5. c. 11)) and for purposes connected with the matters aforesaid. (Repealed by National Insurance Act 1946 (9 & 10 Geo. 6. c. 67))
Public Health (Drainage of Trade Premises) Act 1937 (repealed)	1 Edw. 8 & 1 Geo. 6. c. 40	1 July 1937
An Act to amend the law with respect to the discharge of trade effluents into public sewers of local authorities.
Exchange Equalisation Account Act 1937 (repealed)	1 Edw. 8 & 1 Geo. 6. c. 41	6 July 1937
An Act to increase to five hundred and fifty million pounds the aggregate amount which may be issued to the Exchange Equalisation Account out of the Consolidated Fund. (Repealed by Currency (Defence) Act 1939 (2 & 3 Geo. 6. c. 64))
Exportation of Horses Act 1937 (repealed)	1 Edw. 8 & 1 Geo. 6. c. 42	6 July 1937
All Act to amend the law with respect to the exportation of horses; and for purposes connected therewith. (Repealed by Diseases of Animals Act 1950 (14 Geo. 6. c. 36))
Public Records (Scotland) Act 1937	1 Edw. 8 & 1 Geo. 6. c. 43	6 July 1937
An Act to make better provision for the preservation, care and custody of the Public Records of Scotland, and for the discharge of the duties of Principal Extractor of the Court of Session.
Road Traffic Act 1937 (repealed)	1 Edw. 8 & 1 Geo. 6. c. 44	6 July 1937
An Act to provide that motor vehicles used under certain conditions are not to be deemed to be stage or express carriages or vehicles carrying passengers for hire or reward at separate fares, and to amend section three of the Road and Rail Traffic Act, 1933. (Note: Road and Rail Traffic Act 1933 (23 & 24 Geo. 5. c. 53)) (Repealed by Road Traffic Act 1960 (8 & 9 Eliz. 2. c. 16))
Hydrogen Cyanide (Fumigation) Act 1937 (repealed)	1 Edw. 8 & 1 Geo. 6. c. 45	6 July 1937
An Act to regulate the fumigation of premises and articles with hydrogen cyanide; and for purposes connected with the matters aforesaid. (Repealed by Control of Substances Hazardous to Health Regulations 1988 (SI 1988/1657))
Physical Training and Recreation Act 1937	1 Edw. 8 & 1 Geo. 6. c. 46	13 July 1937
An Act to provide for the development of facilities for, and the encouragement of, physical training and recreation, and to facilitate the establishment of centres for social activities.
Teachers (Superannuation) Act 1937 (repealed)	1 Edw. 8 & 1 Geo. 6. c. 47	13 July 1937
An Act to amend the Teachers (Superannuation) Acts, 1918 to 1935, and to provide for amendment of the Superannuation Scheme framed under the Education (Scotland) (Superannuation) Acts, 1919 to 1935, so as to permit allocation of part of a teacher's or educational organiser's superannuation benefits to a spouse or dependant, and to make further and better provision for the payment of contributions when service is discontinued; to extend paragraphs (b) and (c) of subsection (1) of section twenty-one of the Teachers (Superannuation) Act, 1925, (Note: Teachers (Superannuation) Act 1925 (15 & 16 Geo. 5. c. 59)) to educational organisers; and for purposes connected with the matters aforesaid. (Repealed for England and Wales by Teachers' Superannuation Act 1965 (c. 83) and for Scotland by Education (Scotland) Act 1946 (9 & 10 Geo. 6. c. 72))
Methylated Spirits (Sale by Retail) (Scotland) Act 1937 (repealed)	1 Edw. 8 & 1 Geo. 6. c. 48	13 July 1937
An Act to control the sale in Scotland of methylated spirits or surgical spirit and of methylated spirits in admixture; and for other purposes connected therewith. (Repealed by Deregulation (Methylated Spirits Sale by Retail) (Scotland) Order 1998 (SI 1998/1602) and Licensing (Scotland) Act 2005 (asp 16))
Trade Marks (Amendment) Act 1937 (repealed)	1 Edw. 8 & 1 Geo. 6. c. 49	13 July 1937
An Act to amend the law relating to trade marks. (Repealed by Trade Marks Act 1938 (1 & 2 Geo. 6. c. 22))
Livestock Industry Act 1937 (repealed)	1 Edw. 8 & 1 Geo. 6. c. 50	20 July 1937
An Act to make provision for the development and better organisation of the livestock industry and industries connected therewith; for paying a subsidy to producers of fat cattle; for regulating the importation of livestock and meat, the holding of livestock markets and the slaughtering of livestock; and for purposes connected with the matters aforesaid. (Repealed by Agriculture Act 1957 (5 & 6 Eliz. 2. c. 57))
Post Office and Telegraph (Money) Act 1937 (repealed)	1 Edw. 8 & 1 Geo. 6. c. 51	20 July 1937
An Act to provide for raising further money for the development of the postal, telegraphic, and telephonic systems, and for raising money for the purpose of repaying to the Post Office Fund moneys applied thereout for such development. (Repealed by Post Office Act 1961 (9 & 10 Eliz. 2. c. 15))
Chairmen of Traffic Commissioners, &c. (Tenure of Office) Act 1937 (repealed)	1 Edw. 8 & 1 Geo. 6. c. 52	20 July 1937
An Act to make provision with respect to the term of office of persons holding the office of chairman of traffic commissioners, of traffic commissioner for the metropolitan traffic area, of chairman of the appeal tribunal established by section fifteen of the Road and Rail Traffic Act, 1933, or of President of the Railway Rates Tribunal, and with respect to the application to such persons of the Superannuation Acts. (Repealed by Transport Act 1962 (10 & 11 Eliz. 2. c. 46))
Agricultural Wages (Regulation) (Scotland) Act 1937 (repealed)	1 Edw. 8 & 1 Geo. 6. c. 53	20 July 1937
An Act to provide for the Regulation of Wages of Workers in Agriculture in Scotland, and for purposes incidental thereto. (Repealed by Agricultural Wages (Scotland) Act 1949 (12, 13 & 14 Geo. 6. c. 30))
Finance Act 1937	1 Edw. 8 & 1 Geo. 6. c. 54	30 July 1937
An Act to grant certain duties of Customs and Inland Revenue (including Excise), to alter other duties, and to amend the law relating to Customs and Inland Revenue (including Excise) and the National Debt, and to make further provision in connection with finance.
Appropriation Act 1937 (repealed)	1 Edw. 8 & 1 Geo. 6. c. 55	30 July 1937
An Act to apply a sum out of the Consolidated Fund to the service of the year ending on the thirty-first day of March, one thousand nine hundred and thirty-eight, and to appropriate the Supplies granted in this Session of Parliament. (Repealed by Statute Law Revision Act 1950 (14 Geo. 6. c. 6))
Coal (Registration of Ownership) Act 1937 (repealed)	1 Edw. 8 & 1 Geo. 6. c. 56	30 July 1937
An Act to make provision for the ascertainment and registration of particulars as to proprietary interests in unworked coal and mines of coal and in certain associated minerals, property and rights in land, and for purposes connected therewith. (Repealed by Statute Law (Repeals) Act 1973 (c. 39))
Matrimonial Causes Act 1937 (repealed)	1 Edw. 8 & 1 Geo. 6. c. 57	30 July 1937
An Act to amend the law relating to marriage and divorce. (Repealed by Matrimonial Causes Act 1950 (14 Geo. 6. c. 25) and Matrimonial Proceedings (Magistrates' Courts) Act 1960 (8 & 9 Eliz. 2. c. 48))
Summary Procedure (Domestic Proceedings) Act 1937 (repealed)	1 Edw. 8 & 1 Geo. 6. c. 58	30 July 1937
An Act to amend the law with respect to the determination by justices of disputes in matters of matrimony, bastardy and the guardianship of infants and other similar matters; to extend the duties of probation officers; and for purposes connected therewith. (Repealed by Magistrates' Courts Act 1952 (15 & 16 Geo. 6 & 1 Eliz. 2. c. 55))
Cinematograph Films (Animals) Act 1937	1 Edw. 8 & 1 Geo. 6. c. 59	30 July 1937
An Act to prohibit the exhibition or distribution of cinematograph films in connection with the production of which suffering may have been caused to animals; and for purposes connected therewith.
Rating and Valuation Act 1937 (repealed)	1 Edw. 8 & 1 Geo. 6. c. 60	30 July 1937
An Act to extend further the duration of certain temporary provisions contained in the Rating and Valuation Act, 1928. (Note: Rating and Valuation Act 1928 (18 & 19 Geo. 5. c. 8)) (Repealed by Rating and Valuation (Miscellaneous Provisions) Act 1955 (4 & 5 Eliz. 2. c. 9))
Export Guarantees Act 1937 (repealed)	1 Edw. 8 & 1 Geo. 6. c. 61	30 July 1937
An Act to amend and consolidate the Overseas Trade Acts, 1920 to 1934. (Repealed by Export Guarantees Act 1939 (2 & 3 Geo. 6. c. 5))
Coal Mines (Employment of Boys) Act 1937 (repealed)	1 Edw. 8 & 1 Geo. 6. c. 62	30 July 1937
An Act to amend the law relating to the employment of boys underground in coal mines. (Repealed by Mines and Quarries Act 1954 (2 & 3 Eliz. 2. c. 70))
Nigeria (Remission of Payments) Act 1937 (repealed)	1 Edw. 8 & 1 Geo. 6. c. 63	30 July 1937
An Act to remit any sums which have become or may become payable to the Exchequer under section three of the Royal Niger Company Act, 1899, (Note: Royal Niger Company Act 1899 (62 & 63 Vict. c. 43)) and to extinguish the liability for the payment of such sums. (Repealed by Statute Law Revision Act 1950 (14 Geo. 6. c. 6))
Isle of Man (Customs) Act 1937 (repealed)	1 Edw. 8 & 1 Geo. 6. c. 64	30 July 1937
An Act to amend the law with respect to customs in the Isle of Man. (Repealed for the Isle of Man by Customs and Excise Legislation (Application) Order 1976 (GC No 1/76))
London Naval Treaty Act 1937 (repealed)	1 Edw. 8 & 1 Geo. 6. c. 65	30 July 1937
An Act to enable effect to be given to a Treaty signed in London on behalf of His Majesty and certain other Powers. (Repealed by Statute Law Revision Act 1963 (c. 30))
Milk (Amendment) Act 1937 (repealed)	1 Edw. 8 & 1 Geo. 6. c. 66	30 July 1937
An Act to extend, with amendments, certain temporary provisions of the Milk Acts, 1934 (Note: Milk Act 1934 (24 & 25 Geo. 5. c. 51)) and 1936, (Note: Milk (Extension of Temporary Provisions) Act 1936 (26 Geo. 5 & 1 Edw. 8. c. 9)) and otherwise to amend the said Acts. (Repealed by Agricultural Marketing Act 1958 (6 & 7 Eliz. 2. c. 47))
Factories Act 1937 (repealed)	1 Edw. 8 & 1 Geo. 6. c. 67	30 July 1937
An Act to consolidate, with amendments, the Factory and Workshop Acts, 1901 to 1929, and other enactments relating to factories; and for purposes connected with the purposes aforesaid. (Repealed by Factories Act 1961 (9 & 10 Eliz. 2. c. 34))
Local Government Superannuation Act 1937 (repealed)	1 Edw. 8 & 1 Geo. 6. c. 68	30 July 1937
An Act to make further and better provision with respect to the payment of superannuation allowances and gratuities by local authorities and certain statutory undertakers, and with respect to the persons entitled to participate in the benefits of a local authority's superannuation fund or scheme, and for purposes connected with the matters aforesaid. (Repealed by Teachers (Superannuation) Act 1945 (8 & 9 Geo. 6. c. 14), National Insurance Act 1946 (9 & 10 Geo. 6. c. 67), Fire Services Act 1947 (10 & 11 Geo. 6. c. 41), Statute Law Revision Act 1950 (14 Geo. 6. c. 6), Local Government Superannuation Act 1953 (1 & 2 Eliz. 2. c. 25), London Government Act 1963 (c. 33), Courts Act 1971 (c. 23) and Superannuation Act 1972 (c. 11))
Local Government Superannuation (Scotland) Act 1937 (repealed)	1 Edw. 8 & 1 Geo. 6. c. 69	30 July 1937
An Act to make further and better provision with respect to the payment of superannuation allowances and gratuities by local authorities and certain statutory undertakers in Scotland, and with respect to the persons entitled to participate in the benefits of a local authority's superannuation fund or scheme, and for purposes connected with the matters aforesaid. (Repealed by Education (Scotland) Act 1945 (8 & 9 Geo. 6. c. 37), National Insurance Act 1946 (9 & 10 Geo. 6. c. 67), Fire Services Act 1947 (10 & 11 Geo. 6. c. 41), National Health Service (Scotland) (Superannuation) Regulations 1948 (SI 1948/412), Statute Law Revision Act 1950 (14 Geo. 6. c. 6), Local Government Superannuation Act 1953 (1 & 2 Eliz. 2. c. 25) and Superannuation Act 1972 (c. 11))
Agriculture Act 1937 (repealed)	1 Edw. 8 & 1 Geo. 6. c. 70	30 July 1937
An Act to assist farmers to increase the fertility of their land; to provide for securing farmers against any substantial fall in the price of oats and barley, and to raise the limit of the quantity of wheat in respect of which deficiency payments under the Wheat Act, 1932, (Note: Wheat Act 1932 (22 & 23 Geo. 5. c. 24)) may be made at the full rate; to make further grants for land drainage; to promote the eradication of diseases of animals and poultry, and with that object to establish a national service of veterinary inspectors; and for purposes connected with the matters aforesaid. (Repealed by Statute Law (Repeals) Act 1986 (c. 12))

=== Local acts ===
Short title	Citation	Royal assent
Long title
Greenock Burgh Extension, &c. Order Confirmation Act 1937	1 Edw. 8 & 1 Geo. 6. c. iii	19 March 1937
An Act to confirm a Provisional Order under the Private Legislation Procedure (Scotland) Act 1936 (Note: Private Legislation Procedure (Scotland) Act 1936 (26 Geo. 5 & 1 Edw. 8. c. 52)) relating to Greenock Burgh Extension, &c.
	Greenock Burgh Extension, &c. Order 1937	
Ministry of Health Provisional Order Confirmation (Evesham and Pershore Joint Hospital District) Act 1937 (repealed)	1 Edw. 8 & 1 Geo. 6. c. iv	19 March 1937
An Act to confirm a Provisional Order of the Minister of Health relating to the Evesham and Pershore Joint Hospital District. (Repealed by Statute Law (Repeals) Act 1998 (c. 43))
	Evesham and Pershore Joint Hospital Order 1936 (Note: Although passed in 1937, the short title is specified as the Evesham and Pershore Joint Hospital Order 1936.) Provisional Order altering the Evesham Joint Hospital Orders 1883 to 1931.	
Ministry of Health Provisional Order Confirmation (Port of Manchester) Act 1937	1 Edw. 8 & 1 Geo. 6. c. v	19 March 1937
An Act to confirm a Provisional Order of the Minister of Health relating to the Port of Manchester.
	Manchester Port Order 1936 (Note: Although passed in 1937, the short title is specified as the Manchester Port Order 1936.) Provisional order altering a confirming Act. (Note: Local Government Board's Provisional order Confirmation (Port) Act 1901 (1 Edw. 7. c. clxx))	
Newcastle-upon-Tyne Corporation (Trolley Vehicles) Order Confirmation Act 1937	1 Edw. 8 & 1 Geo. 6. c. vi	25 March 1937
An Act to confirm a Provisional Order made by the Minister of Transport under the Newcastle-upon-Tyne Corporation (General Powers) Act 1935 (Note: Newcastle-upon-Tyne Corporation (General Powers) Act 1935 (25 & 26 Geo. 5. c. cxxiv)) relating to Newcastle-upon-Tyne Trolley Vehicles.
	Newcastle-upon-Tyne Corporation (Trolley Vehicles) Order 1937 Order authorising the lord mayor aldermen and citizens of the city and county of Newcastle-upon-Tyne to use trolley vehicles upon additional routes in the said city and county.	
Ministry of Health Provisional Order Confirmation (Bedford) Act 1937 (repealed)	1 Edw. 8 & 1 Geo. 6. c. vii	25 March 1937
An Act to confirm a Provisional Order of the Minister of Health relating to the borough of Bedford. (Repealed by Statute Law (Repeals) Act 1995 (c. 44))
	Bedford Order 1937 Provisional order altering certain local Acts.	
Ministry of Health Provisional Order Confirmation (Colwyn Bay) Act 1937 (repealed)	1 Edw. 8 & 1 Geo. 6. c. viii	25 March 1937
An Act to confirm a Provisional Order of the Minister of Health relating to the borough of Colwyn Bay. (Repealed by Clwyd County Council Act 1985 (c. xliv))
	Colwyn Bay Order 1937 Provisional Order amending a local Act. (Note: Colwyn Bay Urban District Council Act 1926 (16 & 17 Geo. 5. c. lxxx))	
Ministry of Health Provisional Order Confirmation (East Hertfordshire Joint Hospital District) Act 1937	1 Edw. 8 & 1 Geo. 6. c. ix	25 March 1937
An Act to confirm a Provisional Order of the Minister of Health relating to the East Hertfordshire Joint Hospital District.
	East Hertfordshire Joint Hospital Order 1937 Provisional order altering certain confirming Acts.	
Ministry of Health Provisional Order Confirmation (Waltham Joint Hospital District) Act 1937	1 Edw. 8 & 1 Geo. 6. c. x	25 March 1937
An Act to confirm a Provisional Order of the Minister of Health relating to the Waltham Joint Hospital District.
	Waltham Joint Hospital Order 1937 Provisional order altering certain confirming Acts.	
Ministry of Health Provisional Order Confirmation (Wisbech Joint Isolation Hospital District) Act 1937	1 Edw. 8 & 1 Geo. 6. c. xi	25 March 1937
An Act to confirm a Provisional Order of the Minister of Health relating to the Wisbech Joint Isolation Hospital District.
	Wisbech Joint Isolation Hospital Order 1937 Provisional order forming a united district under section 279 of the Public Health Act 1875. (Note: Public Health Act 1875 (38 & 39 Vict. c. 55))	
Ministry of Health Provisional Order Confirmation (Ealing Extension) Act 1937 (repealed)	1 Edw. 8 & 1 Geo. 6. c. xii	25 March 1937
An Act to confirm a Provisional Order of the Minister of Health relating to the borough of Ealing. (Repealed by Local Law (North West London Boroughs) Order 1965 (SI 1965/533))
	Ealing (Extension) Act 1936 (Note: Although passed in 1937, the short title is specified as the Ealing (Extension) Act 1936.) Provisional Order made in pursuance of the Local Government Act 1933 (Note: Local Government Act 1933 (23 & 24 Geo. 5. c. 51)) for altering borough boundaries.	
Ministry of Health Provisional Order Confirmation (Somerset and Wiltshire) Act 1937	1 Edw. 8 & 1 Geo. 6. c. xiii	25 March 1937
An Act to confirm a Provisional Order of the Minister of Health relating to the counties of Somerset and Wiltshire.
	Somerset and Wiltshire Order 1936 (Note: Although passed in 1937, the short title is specified as the Somerset and Wiltshire Order 1936.) Provisional Order made in pursuance of the Local Government Act 1933 for altering county boundaries.	
Liverpool Exchange Act 1937 (repealed)	1 Edw. 8 & 1 Geo. 6. c. xiv	25 March 1937
An Act to authorise the sale of the undertaking of the Liverpool Exchange Company Limited to confer further powers upon that company and the purchaser of the undertaking and for other purposes. (Repealed by Liverpool Exchange Act 1988 (c. ix))
Rothesay Water Order Confirmation Act 1937	1 Edw. 8 & 1 Geo. 6. c. xv	29 April 1937
An Act to confirm a Provisional Order under the Private Legislation Procedure (Scotland) Act 1936 relating to Rothesay Water.
	Rothesay Water Order 1937 Provisional Order to empower the provost magistrates and councillors of the royal burgh of Rothesay in the county of Bute to execute certain water works and for other purposes.	
Edinburgh Royal Maternity and Simpson Memorial Hospital Order Confirmation Act 1937	1 Edw. 8 & 1 Geo. 6. c. xvi	29 April 1937
An Act to confirm a Provisional Order under the Private Legislation Procedure (Scotland) Act 1936 relating to the Edinburgh Royal Maternity and Simpson Memorial Hospital.
	Edinburgh Royal Maternity and Simpson Memorial Hospital Order 1937 Provisional Order to alter the date of transfer under the Edinburgh Royal Maternity and Simpson Memorial Hospital Order 1932 and for other purposes.	
Kingston-upon-Hull Provisional Order Confirmation Act 1937	1 Edw. 8 & 1 Geo. 6. c. xvii	29 April 1937
An Act to confirm a Provisional Order made by one of His Majesty's Principal Secretaries of State under the Public Health Act 1875 relating to Kingston upon Hull.
	Kingston-upon-Hull Order 1937 Provisional Order made by the Secretary of State under the Kingston upon Hull Corporation Act 1907. (Note: Kingston-upon-Hull Corporation Act 1907 (7 Edw. 7. c. cvi))	
Margate Broadstairs and District Electricity Act 1937	1 Edw. 8 & 1 Geo. 6. c. xviii	29 April 1937
An Act to synchronise the dates of purchase of the several portions of the electricity undertaking of the Isle of Thanet Electric Supply Company Limited to make new provision with respect to the purchase of the whole of that undertaking and for other purposes.
Rickmansworth and Uxbridge Valley Water Act 1937 (repealed)	1 Edw. 8 & 1 Geo. 6. c. xix	29 April 1937
An Act to make better provision with respect to the laying and maintenance of pipes for the supply of water within the limits of supply of the Rickmansworth and Uxbridge Valley Water Company and for purposes connected therewith. (Repealed by Rickmansworth and Uxbridge Valley Water (Third Schedule) Order 1972 (SI 1972/752))
Brighton, Hove and Worthing Gas Act 1937	1 Edw. 8 & 1 Geo. 6. c. xx	29 April 1937
An Act to confer upon the Brighton Hove and Worthing Gas Company powers with reference to the making of provision for supplies of gas in certain cases and for other purposes.
Ministry of Health Provisional Order Confirmation (Earsdon Joint Hospital District) Act 1937	1 Edw. 8 & 1 Geo. 6. c. xxi	6 May 1937
An Act to confirm a Provisional Order of the Minister of Health relating to the Earsdon Joint Hospital District.
	Earsdon Joint Hospital Order 1936 (Note: Although passed in 1937, the short title is specified as the Earsdon Joint Hospital Order 1936.) Provisional order altering the Earsdon Joint Hospital Order 1904.	
Ministry of Health Provisional Order Confirmation (South Nottinghamshire Joint Hospital District) Act 1937 (repealed)	1 Edw. 8 & 1 Geo. 6. c. xxii	6 May 1937
An Act to confirm a Provisional Order of the Minister of Health relating to the South Nottinghamshire Joint Hospital District. (Repealed by Nottinghamshire County Council Act 1985 (c. xv))
	South Nottinghamshire Joint Hospital Order 1937 Provisional order forming a united district under section 279 of the Public Health Act 1875.	
General Cemetery Act 1937	1 Edw. 8 & 1 Geo. 6. c. xxiii	6 May 1937
An Act to confer further powers upon the General Cemetery Company and for other purposes.
Magdalen Hospital Charity Scheme Confirmation Act 1937 (repealed)	1 Edw. 8 & 1 Geo. 6. c. xxiv	10 June 1937
An Act to confirm a Scheme of the Charity Commissioners for the application or management of the Charity called the Magdalen Hospital in the County of London. (Repealed by Statute Law (Repeals) Act 2013 (c. 2))
	Scheme for the application or management of the Charity called the Magdalen Hospital in the County of London regulated by the Magdalen Hospital Act 1768 (Note: Magdalen Hospital Act 1769 (9 Geo. 3. c. 31)) the Magdalen Hospital Amendment Act 1848 (Note: Magdalen Hospital Amendment Act 1848 (11 & 12 Vict. c. xvii)) and the Magdalen Hospital Amendment Act 1866. (Note: Magdalen Hospital Amendment Act 1866 (29 & 30 Vict. c. cxxx))	
Poor's Allotments in Walton-upon-Thames Charity Scheme Confirmation Act 1937	1 Edw. 8 & 1 Geo. 6. c. xxv	10 June 1937
An Act to confirm a Scheme of the Charity Commissioners for the application or management of the Charity called or known as the Poor's Allotments in the Ancient Parish of Walton-upon-Thames in the County of Surrey.
	Scheme for the application or management of the Charity called or known as the Poor's Allotments in the Ancient Parish of Walton-upon-Thames in the County of Surrey founded by the Inclosure Act 39 and 40 Geo. III. c. lxxxvi. (Note: Walton-upon-Thames and Walton Leigh Inclosure Act 1800 (39 & 40 Geo. 3. c. lxxxvi))	
Glasgow Corporation Order Confirmation Act 1937	1 Edw. 8 & 1 Geo. 6. c. xxvi	10 June 1937
An Act to confirm a Provisional Order under the Private Legislation Procedure (Scotland) Act 1936 relating to Glasgow Corporation.
	Glasgow Corporation Order 1937 Provisional Order to authorise the corporation of the city of Glasgow to borrow further moneys for the purposes of their water undertaking and public parks to make provision with respect to the prevention of refuse in streets &c. and for other purposes.	
London Midland and Scottish Railway Order Confirmation Act 1937	1 Edw. 8 & 1 Geo. 6. c. xxvii	10 June 1937
An Act to confirm a Provisional Order under the Private Legislation Procedure (Scotland) Act 1936 relating to the London Midland and Scottish Railway.
	London Midland and Scottish Railway Order 1937 Provisional Order to extend the time for the completion of certain authorised Railways and Works by the London Midland and Scottish Railway Company and for other purposes.	
Johnstone Burgh Order Confirmation Act 1937	1 Edw. 8 & 1 Geo. 6. c. xxviii	10 June 1937
An Act to confirm a Provisional Order under the Private Legislation Procedure (Scotland) Act 1936 relating to Johnstone Burgh.
	Johnstone Burgh Order 1937 Provisional Order to extend and define the limits of gas supply of the provost magistrates and councillors of the burgh of Johnstone and confer further powers иpоп them in relation to their gas undertaking to transfer to them the maintenance of certain squares and opеп spaces and a disused burial ground within the burgh to make provision with respect to bowling greens and tennis courts and to the local government health and finance of the burgh and for other purposes.	
Grangemouth Burgh Extension Order Confirmation Act 1937	1 Edw. 8 & 1 Geo. 6. c. xxix	10 June 1937
An Act to confirm a Provisional Order under the Private Legislation Procedure (Scotland) Act 1936 relating to Grangemouth Burgh Extension.
	Grangemouth Burgh Extension Order 1937 Provisional Order to extend the boundaries of the burgh of Grangemouth and for other purposes.	
Great Western Railway Act 1937	1 Edw. 8 & 1 Geo. 6. c. xxx	10 June 1937
An Act for conferring further powers upon the Great Western Railway Company in respect of their own undertaking and upon that company and the London Midland and Scottish Railway Company in respect of an undertaking in which they are jointly interested and upon the Great Western and Great Central Railways Joint Committee and for other purposes.
Sheffield Corporation Act 1937	1 Edw. 8 & 1 Geo. 6. c. xxxi	10 June 1937
An Act to authorise the corporation of the city of Sheffield to construct street improvements and additional tramways to confer further powers upon them with respect to their electricity undertaking and with regard to the health improvement good government and finance of the city and for other purposes.
Southern Railway Act 1937	1 Edw. 8 & 1 Geo. 6. c. xxxii	10 June 1937
An Act to empower the Southern Railway Company to construct a railway and other works and to acquire lands to extend the time for the completion of certain works and the compulsory purchase of certain lands and for other purposes.
Wandsworth and District Gas Act 1937	1 Edw. 8 & 1 Geo. 6. c. xxxiii	10 June 1937
An Act to empower the Wandsworth and District Gas Company to raise additional capital and for other purposes.
Burgess Hill Water Act 1937 (repealed)	1 Edw. 8 & 1 Geo. 6. c. xxxiv	10 June 1937
An Act to authorise the Burgess Hill Water Company to construct new works to extend the limits of supply of the Company and to raise additional capital and for other purposes. (Repealed by Mid-Sussex Water Order 1985 (SI 1985/513))
West Ham Corporation Act 1937	1 Edw. 8 & 1 Geo. 6. c. xxxv	10 June 1937
An Act to authorise the mayor aldermen and burgesses of the county borough of West Ham to execute street works and to acquire lands for those and other purposes to extend the time for the completion of certain works and the compulsory acquisition of certain lands to confer further powers upon the Corporation and to make further and better provision for the health local government improvement and finance of the said county borough and for other purposes.
Mansfield District Traction Act 1937 (repealed)	1 Edw. 8 & 1 Geo. 6. c. xxxvi	10 June 1937
An Act to extend the Mansfield District Traction Company's powers of running public service vehicles to confer further financial and other powers upon the Company and for other purposes. (Repealed by Statute Law (Repeals) Act 1995 (c. 44))
Folkestone Pier and Lift Act 1937	1 Edw. 8 & 1 Geo. 6. c. xxxvii	10 June 1937
An Act to empower the Folkestone Pier and Lift Company to sell by agreement the undertaking of that company and for other purposes.
Barnsley Corporation Act 1937	1 Edw. 8 & 1 Geo. 6. c. xxxviii	10 June 1937
An Act to make further provision with respect to the finance of the county borough of Barnsley and for other purposes.
East Anglesey Gas Act 1937	1 Edw. 8 & 1 Geo. 6. c. xxxix	10 June 1937
An Act to incorporate and confer powers on the East Anglesey Gas Company to provide for the transfer to that company of the gas undertaking of the mayor aldermen and burgesses of the borough of Beaumaris for the amalgamation of the said undertaking with the undertaking of the Amlwch Gas Company Limited and for the vesting of the amalgamated undertaking in the Company and for other purposes.
North Metropolitan Electric Power Supply Act 1937	1 Edw. 8 & 1 Geo. 6. c. xl	10 June 1937
An Act to transfer to the North Metropolitan Electric Power Supply Company the undertakings of the Harrow Electric Light and Power Company Limited to make new provision as to the rights of purchase of the urban district council of Harrow and for other purposes.
Grimsby Corporation (Grimsby, Cleethorpes and District Water, &c.) Act 1937	1 Edw. 8 & 1 Geo. 6. c. xli	10 June 1937
An of Act to incorporate a joint board consisting of representatives of the corporations of Grimsby and Cleethorpes and the rural district council of Grimsby to transfer to and vest in the Board the undertaking of the Great Grimsby Waterworks Company Limited to empower the Board to construct waterworks to supply water and to acquire lands to empower the mayor aldermen and burgesses of the borough of Grimsby to execute street improvements and to acquire lands for those and other purposes to make further provisions with respect to the finance of the borough of Grimsby and for other purposes.
Berkshire County Council Act 1937 (repealed)	1 Edw. 8 & 1 Geo. 6. c. xlii	10 June 1937
An Act to provide for the construction and maintenance of a bridge in the counties of Berks and Buckingham across the river Thames and approach roads thereto and for other purposes. (Repealed by Berkshire Act 1986 (c. ii))
Glasgow Streets, Sewers and Buildings Consolidation Order Confirmation Act 1937	1 Edw. 8 & 1 Geo. 6. c. xliii	1 July 1937
An Act to confirm a Provisional Order under the Private Legislation Procedure (Scotland) Act 1936 relating to Glasgow Streets Sewers and Buildings.
	Glasgow Streets, Sewers and Buildings Consolidation Order 1937 Provisional Order to consolidate with amendments the Acts and Orders of the corporation of the city of Glasgow with respect to the dean of guild court of the city and to streets sewers buildings celluloid factories and stores advertising signs and other cognate matters and to confer further powers on the Corporation with reference to such matters and for other purposes.	
Staffordshire County Council Act 1937 (repealed)	1 Edw. 8 & 1 Geo. 6. c. xliv	1 July 1937
An Act to confer further powers upon the Staffordshire County Council to make further provision with respect to the local government and finance of the county of Stafford and for other purposes. (Repealed by Staffordshire Act 1983 (c. xviii))
City of London (Various Powers) Act 1937	1 Edw. 8 & 1 Geo. 6. c. xlv	1 July 1937
An Act to authorise the extension and improvement of Billingsgate Market to vary the financial powers of the Corporation and for other purposes.
Waltham Holy Cross Urban District Council Act 1937 (repealed)	1 Edw. 8 & 1 Geo. 6. c. xlvi	1 July 1937
An Act to make further and better provision for the improvement health local government and finances of the urban district of Waltham Holy Cross and for other purposes. (Repealed by Essex Act 1987 (c. xx))
Sheppey Water Act 1937	1 Edw. 8 & 1 Geo. 6. c. xlvii	1 July 1937
An Act to incorporate and confer powers on the Sheppey Water Company and for other purposes.
London County Council (Money) Act 1937 (repealed)	1 Edw. 8 & 1 Geo. 6. c. xlviii	1 July 1937
An Act to regulate the expenditure on capital account and lending of money by the London County Council during the financial period from the first day of April one thousand nine hundred and thirty-seven to the thirtieth day of September one thousand nine hundred and thirty-eight and for other purposes. (Repealed by London County Council (Loans) Act 1955 (4 & 5 Eliz. 2. c. xxvi))
London, Midland and Scottish Railway Act 1937	1 Edw. 8 & 1 Geo. 6. c. xlix	1 July 1937
An Act to empower the London Midland and Scottish Railway Company to construct works and to acquire lands to modify rates dues and charges at Holyhead Harbour and for other purposes.
Richmond (Surrey) Corporation Act 1937	1 Edw. 8 & 1 Geo. 6. c. l	1 July 1937
An Act to empower the mayor aldermen and burgesses of the borough of Richmond (Surrey) to construct street works to confer further powers upon them with respect to their water undertaking to make better provision with respect to the health local government and finance of the borough and for other purposes.
Hastings Pier Act 1937 (repealed)	1 Edw. 8 & 1 Geo. 6. c. li	1 July 1937
An Act to authorise the Hastings Pier Company to raise additional capital and for other purposes. (Repealed by Hastings Pier Act 1985 (c. xxxiii))
Ashdown Forest Act 1937 (repealed)	1 Edw. 8 & 1 Geo. 6. c. lii	1 July 1937
An Act to alter the constitution of the Conservators of Ashdown Forest to confer further powers upon the said Conservators and to provide for contributions towards their expenses by certain authorities and for other purposes. (Repealed by Ashdown Forest Act 1974 (c. xxi))
London and North Eastern Railway Act 1937	1 Edw. 8 & 1 Geo. 6. c. liii	1 July 1937
An Act to empower the London and North Eastern Railway Company to construct a railway and other works and to acquire lands to make provision with respect to the Nottingham Canal of the said Company and for other purposes.
Newquay and District Water Act 1937	1 Edw. 8 & 1 Geo. 6. c. liv	1 July 1937
An Act to empower the Newquay and District Water Company to extend their limits for the supply of water to empower them to raise further capital to confer further powers upon the Company and for other purposes.
Barnet District Gas and Water Act 1937	1 Edw. 8 & 1 Geo. 6. c. lv	1 July 1937
An Act to authorise the Barnet District Gas and Water Company to construct new waterworks and to raise additional capital to adjust the boundaries of the Company's water limits to make better provision with respect to the repair and maintenance of pipes for the supply of water within the water limits to extend the Company's gas limits and for other purposes.
Kingsbridge and Salcombe Water Board Act 1937	1 Edw. 8 & 1 Geo. 6. c. lvi	1 July 1937
An Act to alter the constitution of the Kingsbridge and Salcombe Water Board to make the Kingsbridge Rural District Council a constituent authority to authorise the Board to construct additional waterworks and for other purposes.
National Trust Act 1937	1 Edw. 8 & 1 Geo. 6. c. lvii	1 July 1937
An Act to confer further powers upon the National Trust for Places of Historic Interest or Natural Beauty and for other purposes.
Taf Fechan Water Supply Act 1937 (repealed)	1 Edw. 8 & 1 Geo. 6. c. lviii	1 July 1937
An Act to make further provision in regard to the undertaking of the Taf Fechan Water Supply Board to confer further powers upon that Board and the constituent authorities thereof and for other purposes. (Repealed by Taf Fechan Water Board Order 1964 (SI 1965/1588))
Warrington Corporation Act 1937	1 Edw. 8 & 1 Geo. 6. c. lix	1 July 1937
An Act to enlarge the powers of the mayor aldermen and burgesses of the borough of Warrington for the abstraction of water from the river Mersey for the purposes of their water undertaking to make further provision with regard to the water electricity gas and markets undertakings of the Corporation and the health local government and improvement of the borough and for other purposes.
Cleethorpes Corporation (Trolley Vehicles) Order Confirmation Act 1937 (repealed)	1 Edw. 8 & 1 Geo. 6. c. lx	6 July 1937
An Act to confirm a Provisional Order made by the Minister of Transport under the Cleethorpes Urban District Council Act 1928 (Note: Cleethorpes Urban District Council Act 1928 (18 & 19 Geo. 5. c. lxxvi)) relating to Cleethorpes Trolley Vehicles. (Repealed by Humberside Act 1982 (c. iii))
	Cleethorpes Corporation (Trolley Vehicles) Order 1937 Order authorising the mayor aldermen and burgesses of the borough of Cleethorpes to use trolley vehicles иpоп additional routes in the borough of Cleethorpes and the borough of Grimsby.	
Walsall Corporation (Trolley Vehicles) Order Confirmation Act 1937 (repealed)	1 Edw. 8 & 1 Geo. 6. c. lxi	6 July 1937
An Act to confirm a Provisional Order made by the Minister of Transport under the Walsall Corporation Act 1925 (Note: Walsall Corporation Act 1925 (15 & 16 Geo. 5. c. cxxii)) relating to Walsall trolley vehicles. (Repealed by Walsall Corporation Act 1969 (c. lviii))
	Walsall Corporation (Trolley Vehicles) Order 1937 Order authorising the mayor aldermen and burgesses of the borough of Walsall to use trolley vehicles upon additional routes in the borough of Walsall and the urban district of Darlaston.	
Provisional Orders (Marriages) Confirmation Act 1937 (repealed)	1 Edw. 8 & 1 Geo. 6. c. lxii	6 July 1937
An Act to confirm certain Provisional Orders made by one of His Majesty's Principal Secretaries of State under the Marriages Validity (Provisional Orders) Acts 1905 (Note: Provisional Order (Marriages) Act 1905 (5 Edw. 7. c. 23)) and 1924. (Note: Marriages Validity (Provisional Orders) Act 1924 (14 & 15 Geo. 5. c. 20)) (Repealed by Statute Law (Repeals) Act 1977 (c. 18))
	Leighton Buzzard Baptist Church Order.	
	Brignall Church Order.	
	Saint John Shotley Order.	
Dunstable Gas and Water Act 1937 (repealed)	1 Edw. 8 & 1 Geo. 6. c. lxiii	6 July 1937
An Act to make new provisions as to the capital of the Dunstable Gas and Water Company to extend the limits of the Company for the supply of gas to authorise the construction of additional waterworks and the raising of additional capital and for other purposes. (Repealed by Luton Water Order 1960 (SI 1960/1515))
Hastings Extension Act 1937 (repealed)	1 Edw. 8 & 1 Geo. 6. c. lxiv	6 July 1937
An Act to extend the boundaries of the borough of Hastings and for purposes incidental thereto. (Repealed by East Sussex Act 1981 (c. xxv))
Kent Electric Power Act 1937	1 Edw. 8 & 1 Geo. 6. c. lxv	6 July 1937
An Act to authorise the Kent Electric Power Company to raise additional capital and for other purposes.
Pontypool Gas and Water Act 1937	1 Edw. 8 & 1 Geo. 6. c. lxvi	6 July 1937
An Act to provide for the transfer to the Pontypool Gas and Water Company of the undertaking of the Usk Water Works Company Limited to extend the limits of the Pontypool Gas and Water Company for the supply of water and to authorise them to construct new works and to raise additional capital and for other purposes.
Rochdale Corporation Act 1937	1 Edw. 8 & 1 Geo. 6. c. lxvii	6 July 1937
An Act to confer further powers upon the corporation of Rochdale with respect to their water gas electricity and markets undertakings to make better provision for the health local government and finance of the borough and for other purposes.
Wessex Electricity Act 1937	1 Edw. 8 & 1 Geo. 6. c. lxviii	6 July 1937
An Act to confer further powers on the Wessex Electricity Company and for other purposes.
Huddersfield Corporation Act 1937	1 Edw. 8 & 1 Geo. 6. c. lxix	6 July 1937
An Act to provide for the transfer of the Holme reservoirs to the mayor aldermen and burgesses of the borough of Huddersfield and for the transfer of one of those reservoirs from the said mayor aldermen and burgesses to the Holmfirth Urban District Council to authorise the said mayor aldermen and burgesses to construct waterworks and to confer further powers upon them with reference to the supply of water gas and electricity to provide for the transfer to the said mayor aldermen and burgesses of the Lindley Mechanics Hall and to make further provision for the local government of the borough and for other purposes.
Pier and Harbour Order (Falmouth) Confirmation Act 1937	1 Edw. 8 & 1 Geo. 6. c. lxx	13 July 1937
An Act to confirm a Provisional Order made by the Minister of Transport under the General Pier and Harbour Act 1861 (Note: General Pier and Harbour Act 1861 (24 & 25 Vict. c. 45)) relating to Falmouth.
	Falmouth Harbour Order 1937 Order to vary the constitution of the Falmouth Harbour Commissioners to make further provision for the maintenance and regulation of Falmouth Harbour and for other purposes.	
Pier and Harbour Order (Culag (Lochinver)) Confirmation Act 1937	1 Edw. 8 & 1 Geo. 6. c. lxxi	13 July 1937
An Act to confirm a Provisional Order made by the Minister of Transport under the General Pier and Harbour Act 1861 relating to Culag (Lochinver).
	Culag (Lochinver) Pier Order 1937 Order for the maintenance and regulation of Culag (Lochinver) Pier in the county of Sutherland for authorising the levying of rates and dues in respect thereof and for other purposes.	
Pier and Harbour Order (Fowey) Confirmation Act 1937	1 Edw. 8 & 1 Geo. 6. c. lxxii	13 July 1937
An Act to confirm a Provisional Order made by the Minister of Transport under the General Pier and Harbour Act 1861 relating to Fowey.
	Fowey Harbour Order 1937 Order for the management and improvement of the Harbour of Fowey in the county of Cornwall.	
Ministry of Health Provisional Order Confirmation (Maidenhead Water) Act 1937	1 Edw. 8 & 1 Geo. 6. c. lxxiii	13 July 1937
An Act to confirm a Provisional Order of the Minister of Health relating to the Maidenhead Waterworks Company.
	Maidenhead Water Order 1937 Provisional Order under the Gas and Water Works Facilities Act 1870 (Note: Gas and Water Works Facilities Act 1870 (33 & 34 Vict. c. 70)) and the Gas and Water Works Facilities Act 1870 Amendment Act 1873 (Note: Gas and Water Works Facilities Act 1870 Amendment Act 1873 (36 & 37 Vict. c. 89)) empowering the Maidenhead Waterworks Company to raise additional capital and for other purposes.	
Ministry of Health Provisional Order Confirmation (Sevenoaks Water) Act 1937	1 Edw. 8 & 1 Geo. 6. c. lxxiv	13 July 1937
An Act to confirm a Provisional Order of the Minister of Health relating to the Sevenoaks Waterworks Company.
	Sevenoaks Water Order 1937 Provisional Order under the Gas and Water Works Facilities Act 1870 and the Gas and Water Works Facilities Act 1870 Amendment Act 1873 empowering the Sevenoaks Waterworks Company to raise additional capital and re-define their limits of supply conferring further powers on the Company with regard to the supply of water and for other purposes.	
Newcastle-under-Lyme Corporation Act 1937	1 Edw. 8 & 1 Geo. 6. c. lxxv	13 July 1937
An Act to vest in the mayor aldermen and burgesses of the borough of Newcastle-under-Lyme the properties and liabilities of the trustees of the Newcastle-under-Lyme Marsh Lands to confer further powers upon the said mayor aldermen and burgesses with reference to their gas and electricity undertakings and to make further provision with regard to the health local government and improvement of the said borough and for other purposes.
Eastbourne Extension Act 1937 (repealed)	1 Edw. 8 & 1 Geo. 6. c. lxxvi	13 July 1937
An Act to extend the boundaries of the County Borough of Eastbourne and for purposes incidental thereto; and for other purposes. (Repealed by East Sussex Act 1981 (c. xxv))
Gosport Water Act 1937	1 Edw. 8 & 1 Geo. 6. c. lxxvii	13 July 1937
An Act to authorise the Gosport Waterworks Company to construct additional waterworks to extend the limits of supply and to enlarge the capital and borrowing powers of the Company to confer further powers upon the Company and for other purposes.
Hastings Corporation (General Powers) Act 1937	1 Edw. 8 & 1 Geo. 6. c. lxxviii	13 July 1937
An Act to empower the mayor aldermen and burgesses of the borough of Hastings to construct additional waterworks and to acquire lands to extend their limits for the supply of water to confer upon them further powers with respect to their water and electricity undertakings to empower them to purchase in certain circumstances the undertaking of the Hastings Tramways Company to make further provision for the improvement health good government and finance of the borough and for other purposes.
Lancashire Electric Power Act 1937	1 Edw. 8 & 1 Geo. 6. c. lxxix	13 July 1937
An Act to confer further powers on the Lancashire Electric Power Company and for other purposes.
Rotherham Corporation Act 1937	1 Edw. 8 & 1 Geo. 6. c. lxxx	13 July 1937
An Act to empower the mayor aldermen and burgesses of the county borough of Rotherham to construct street improvements and to acquire land for that and other purposes to make further provision with regard to their water gas electricity transport cemetery and market undertakings and to make further provision with regard to the health local government and improvement of the borough and for other purposes.
Ilford Corporation Act 1937	1 Edw. 8 & 1 Geo. 6. c. lxxxi	13 July 1937
An Act to confer further powers on the mayor aldermen and burgesses of the borough of Ilford in regard to their electricity undertaking lands and other matters to make further and better provision for the improvement health and local government of the borough and for other purposes.
Motherwell and Wishaw Burgh Order Confirmation Act 1937	1 Edw. 8 & 1 Geo. 6. c. lxxxii	20 July 1937
An Act to confirm a Provisional Order under the Private Legislation Procedure (Scotland) Act 1936 relating to Motherwell and Wishaw Burgh.
	Motherwell and Wishaw Burgh Order 1937 Provisional Order to extend the boundaries of the burgh of Motherwell and Wishaw to confer further powers upon the provost magistrates and councillors of the burgh with regard to their water and gas undertakings to make provision with respect to the local government and health of the burgh and for other purposes.	
Coatbridge Burgh Extension, &c. Order Confirmation Act 1937	1 Edw. 8 & 1 Geo. 6. c. lxxxiii	20 July 1937
An Act to confirm a Provisional Order under the Private Legislation Procedure (Scotland) Act 1936 relating to Coatbridge Burgh Extension &c.
	Coatbridge Burgh Extension, &c. Order 1937 Provisional Order to extend the municipal and police boundaries of the burgh of Coatbridge in the county of Lanark to authorise the provost magistrates and councillors of the said burgh to borrow money to make provision with respect to the local government health and finance of the burgh and for other purposes.	
Edinburgh Corporation Order Confirmation Act 1937 (repealed)	1 Edw. 8 & 1 Geo. 6. c. lxxxiv	20 July 1937
An Act to confirm a Provisional Order under the Private Legislation Procedure (Scotland) Act 1936 relating to Edinburgh Corporation. (Repealed by Edinburgh Corporation Order Confirmation Act 1962 (11 & 12 Eliz. 2. c. ii))
	Edinburgh Corporation Order 1937 Provisional Order to authorise the corporation of the city and royal burgh of Edinburgh to construct works to acquire lands and to borrow money to make further provision as to the superannuation scheme of the Corporation to amend the Edinburgh Corporation Acts to make provision with respect to the local government health and finance of the city and for other purposes.	
Ministry of Health Provisional Order Confirmation (Halifax) Act 1937 (repealed)	1 Edw. 8 & 1 Geo. 6. c. lxxxv	20 July 1937
An Act to confirm a Provisional Order of the Minister of Health relating to the borough of Halifax. (Repealed by West Yorkshire Act 1980 (c. xiv))
	Halifax Order 1937 Provisional order altering a local Act. (Note: Halifax Corporation Act 1900 (63 & 64 Vict. c. ccxxxiv))	
Ministry of Health Provisional Order Confirmation (Hornsea) Act 1937 (repealed)	1 Edw. 8 & 1 Geo. 6. c. lxxxvi	20 July 1937
An Act to confirm a Provisional Order of the Minister of Health relating to the urban district of Hornsea. (Repealed by Humberside Act 1982 (c. iii))
	Hornsea Order 1937 Provisional order partially repealing a local Act. (Note: Hornsea Urban District Council Act 1911 (1 & 2 Geo. 5. c. lxxviii))	
Ministry of Health Provisional Order Confirmation (Tonbridge Water) Act 1937	1 Edw. 8 & 1 Geo. 6. c. lxxxvii	20 July 1937
An Act to confirm a Provisional Order of the Minister of Health relating to the Tonbridge Water Works Company Limited.
	Tonbridge Water Order 1937 Provisional order under the Gas and Water Works Facilities Act 1870 and the Gas and Water Works Facilities Act 1870 Amendment Act 1873 еmрowering the Tonbridge Water Works Company Limited to construct additional waterworks making further provision with regard to the supply of water authorising the company to raise additional capital and for other purposes.	
Banbury Waterworks Act 1937	1 Edw. 8 & 1 Geo. 6. c. lxxxviii	20 July 1937
An Act to authorise the Banbury Water Company to construct new works and raise additional capital to alter the limits of supply of the Company to confer further powers upon the Company to empower them to acquire the undertaking of the Bloxham and District Water Company Limited and for other purposes.
Hertfordshire County Council (Colne Valley Sewerage, &c.) Act 1937	1 Edw. 8 & 1 Geo. 6. c. lxxxix	20 July 1937
An Act to constitute and incorporate a joint board consisting of representatives of the county council of the administrative county of Hertford the councils of the city of St. Alban and of the boroughs of Hemel Hempstead and Watford the urban district councils of Bushey Chorleywood and Rickmansworth and the rural district councils of Barnet Hatfield Hemel Hempstead St. Albans and Watford all in the county of Hertford and the urban district council of Potters Bar in the county of Middlesex to authorise the Board to construct main sewers and other works and to acquire lands for the disposal of sewage to amend certain provisions of the Hertfordshire County Council Act 1935 (Note: Hertfordshire County Council Act 1935 (25 & 26 Geo. 5. c. cxiii)) and for other purposes.
London Passenger Transport Act 1937	1 Edw. 8 & 1 Geo. 6. c. xc	20 July 1937
An Act to empower the London Passenger Transport Board to provide certain services of trolley vehicles to construct new works to acquire lands to extend the time for the compulsory purchase of certain lands and the completion of certain works to confer further powers on the Board and for other purposes.
London County Council (General Powers) Act 1937	1 Edw. 8 & 1 Geo. 6. c. xci	20 July 1937
An Act to confer further powers upon the London County Council and other authorities and for other purposes.
Wadebridge Rural District Council Act 1937	1 Edw. 8 & 1 Geo. 6. c. xcii	20 July 1937
An Act to confer powers on the Wadebridge Rural District Council with reference to the construction of waterworks and the supply of water and for other purposes.
Torquay Corporation Act 1937	1 Edw. 8 & 1 Geo. 6. c. xciii	20 July 1937
An Act to empower the Corporation of Torquay to execute street works and harbour and sea front improvements and to acquire and develop lands to confer further powers upon the Corporation with respect to the local government of the borough and for other purposes.
Newcastle-upon-Tyne Corporation Act 1937	1 Edw. 8 & 1 Geo. 6. c. xciv	20 July 1937
An Act to empower the lord mayor aldermen and citizens of the city and county of Newcastle-upon-Tyne to grant allowances to their employees in certain cases and for other purposes.
Bucks Water Act 1937	1 Edw. 8 & 1 Geo. 6. c. xcv	20 July 1937
An Act to constitute a joint board consisting of representatives of the county council of the administrative county of Buckingham and the rural district councils of Aylesbury Buckingham Wing and Winslow to vest in the said Board the water undertakings of certain of the constituent authorities to authorise the Board to execute works and to supply water and for other purposes.
Whitehaven Harbour Act 1937	1 Edw. 8 & 1 Geo. 6. c. xcvi	20 July 1937
An Act to authorise the Whitehaven Harbour Commissioners to make arrangements with their Bondholders, and for other purposes.
Woodhall Spa Urban District Council Act 1937	1 Edw. 8 & 1 Geo. 6. c. xcvii	20 July 1937
An Act to transfer to the Urban District Council District of Woodhall Spa the Water Undertaking of the Woodhall Spa Gas and Water Company; to authorise the Council to construct waterworks and supply water; to provide for the utilisation and development of the mineral springs in the district of the Council; and for other purposes.
Coulsdon and Purley Urban District Council Act 1937	1 Edw. 8 & 1 Geo. 6. c. xcviii	20 July 1937
An Act to confer further powers on the Urban District Council of Coulsdon and Purley for and in connection with the improvement of health local government and finances of their district; to confer powers on the Council in relation to street trading; and for other purposes.
Clyde Valley Electrical Power Order Confirmation Act 1937 (repealed)	1 Edw. 8 & 1 Geo. 6. c. xcix	30 July 1937
An Act to confirm a Provisional Order under the Private Legislation Procedure (Scotland) Act 1936 relating to the Clyde Valley Electrical Power Company. (Repealed by South of Scotland Electricity Order Confirmation Act 1956 (4 & 5 Eliz. 2. c. xciv))
	Clyde Valley Electrical Power Order 1937	
Ferguson Bequest Fund Order Confirmation Act 1937	1 Edw. 8 & 1 Geo. 6. c. c	30 July 1937
An Act to confirm a Provisional Order under the Private Legislation Procedure (Scotland) Act 1936 relating to the Ferguson Bequest Fund.
	Ferguson Bequest Fund Order 1937	
Royal Samaritan Hospital for Women Glasgow Order Confirmation Act 1937	1 Edw. 8 & 1 Geo. 6. c. ci	30 July 1937
An Act to confirm a Provisional Order under the Private Legislation Procedure (Scotland) Act 1936 relating to the Royal Samaritan Hospital for Women Glasgow.
	Royal Samaritan Hospital for Women Glasgow Order 1937	
Aberdeen Corporation (Water, Gas, Electricity and Transport) Order Confirmation Act 1937	1 Edw. 8 & 1 Geo. 6. c. cii	30 July 1937
An Act to confirm a Provisional Order under the Private Legislation Procedure (Scotland) Act, 1936, relating to Aberdeen Corporation (Water, Gas, Electricity and Transport).
	Aberdeen Corporation (Water, Gas, Electricity and Transport) Order 1937	
Elgin and Lossiemouth Harbour Order Confirmation Act 1937	1 Edw. 8 & 1 Geo. 6. c. ciii	30 July 1937
An Act to confirm a Provisional Order under the Private Legislation Procedure (Scotland) Act, 1936, relating to Elgin and Lossiemouth Harbour.
	Elgin and Lossiemouth Harbour Order 1937	
Paisley Corporation Order Confirmation Act 1937	1 Edw. 8 & 1 Geo. 6. c. civ	30 July 1937
An Act to confirm a Provisional Order under the Private Legislation Procedure (Scotland) Act, 1936, relating to Paisley Corporation.
	Paisley Corporation Order 1937	
Ministry of Health Provisional Order Confirmation (Bridlington) Act 1937	1 Edw. 8 & 1 Geo. 6. c. cv	30 July 1937
An Act to confirm a Provisional Order of the Minister of Health relating to the borough of Bridlington.
	Bridlington Order 1937	
Ministry of Health Provisional Order Confirmation (Guildford) Act 1937	1 Edw. 8 & 1 Geo. 6. c. cvi	30 July 1937
An Act to confirm a Provisional Order of the Minister of Health relating to the borough of Guildford.
	Guildford Order 1937	
Ministry of Health Provisional Order Confirmation (Rymney Valley Sewerage District and Western Valleys (Monmouthshire) Sewerage District) Act 1937	1 Edw. 8 & 1 Geo. 6. c. cvii	30 July 1937
An Act to confirm a Provisional Order of the Minister of Health relating to the Rymney Valley Sewerage District and Western Valleys (Monmouthshire) Sewerage District.
	Rhymney Valley and Western Valleys (Monmouthshire) Sewerage Boards Order 1937	
Ministry of Health Provisional Order Confirmation (Selby) Act 1937	1 Edw. 8 & 1 Geo. 6. c. cviii	30 July 1937
An Act to confirm a Provisional Order of the Minister of Health relating to the urban district of Selby.
	Selby Order 1937	
Ministry of Health Provisional Order Confirmation (South East Essex Joint Hospital District) Act 1937	1 Edw. 8 & 1 Geo. 6. c. cix	30 July 1937
An Act to confirm a Provisional Order of the Minister of Health relating to the South East Essex Joint Hospital District.
	South East Essex Joint Hospital Order 1937	
Ministry of Health Provisional Order Confirmation (Tynemouth) Act 1937 (repealed)	1 Edw. 8 & 1 Geo. 6. c. cx	30 July 1937
An Act to confirm a Provisional Order of the Minister of Health relating to the borough of Tynemouth. (Repealed by Tyne and Wear Act 1980 (c. xliii))
	Tynemouth Order 1937	
Ministry of Health Provisional Order Confirmation (Birmingham, Tame and Rea Main Sewerage District) Act 1937 (repealed)	1 Edw. 8 & 1 Geo. 6. c. cxi	30 July 1937
An Act to confirm a Provisional Order of the Minister of Health relating to the Birmingham, Tame and Rea Main Sewerage District. (Repealed by West Midlands County Council Act 1980 (c. xi))
	Birmingham, Tame and Rea Main Sewerage District Order 1937	
Ministry of Health Provisional Order Confirmation (Wisbech Water) Act 1937	1 Edw. 8 & 1 Geo. 6. c. cxii	30 July 1937
An Act to confirm a Provisional Order of the Minister of Health relating to the Wisbech Water Works Company.
	Wisbech Water Order 1937	
Ministry of Health Provisional Order Confirmation (Yeadon Water) Act 1937 (repealed)	1 Edw. 8 & 1 Geo. 6. c. cxiii	30 July 1937
An Act to confirm a Provisional Order of the Minister of Health relating to the Yeadon Waterworks Company. (Repealed by West Yorkshire Act 1980 (c. xiv))
	Yeadon Water Order 1937	
Ministry of Health Provisional Order Confirmation (Clevedon Water) Act 1937	1 Edw. 8 & 1 Geo. 6. c. cxiv	30 July 1937
An Act to confirm a Provisional Order of the Minister of Health relating to the Clevedon Water Company.
	Clevedon Water Order 1937	
Ministry of Health Provisional Order Confirmation (Morecambe and Heysham) Act 1937 (repealed)	1 Edw. 8 & 1 Geo. 6. c. cxv	30 July 1937
An Act to confirm a Provisional Order of the Minister of Health relating to the borough of Morecambe and Heysham. (Repealed by County of Lancashire Act 1984 (c. xxi))
	Morecambe and Heysham Order 1937	
Aberystwyth Rural District Council Act 1937	1 Edw. 8 & 1 Geo. 6. c. cxvi	30 July 1937
An Act to empower the Aberystwyth Rural District Council to acquire the reservoir known as Llyn-Craig-y-pistyll and to construct waterworks, to make further provision in regard to their water undertaking and the local government of their district, to amend the Acts relating to the supply of water by the Aberystwyth Corporation, and for other purposes.
Bath Corporation Act 1937	1 Edw. 8 & 1 Geo. 6. c. cxvii	30 July 1937
An Act to make provision for the removal of the Royal National Hospital for Rheumatic Diseases Bath to a new site in the city of Bath; to authorise the Mayor Aldermen and Citizens of the said city to execute street works and to empower the said Mayor Aldermen and Citizens to acquire lands for the said new site for the proposed street works and for other purposes; to make further provision as to the local government and improvement of the city and the finances of the Corporation thereof; and for other purposes.
Poole Corporation Act 1937	1 Edw. 8 & 1 Geo. 6. c. cxviii	30 July 1937
An Act to enact provisions with respect to the bridge known as "Poole Bridge" in the borough of Poole; to make further and better provision with respect to the health local government and finance of the borough, and for other purposes.
Taunton Corporation Act 1937	1 Edw. 8 & 1 Geo. 6. c. cxix	30 July 1937
An Act to empower the Mayor Aldermen and Burgesses of the Borough of Taunton to construct additional waterworks and to purchase land therefor; to confer further powers upon the Corporation with regard to their water undertaking; to make further provision with regard to the health local government and improvement of the borough; and for other purposes.
North Cotswold Rural District Council Act 1937	1 Edw. 8 & 1 Geo. 6. c. cxx	30 July 1937
An Act to confer powers on the North Cotswold Rural District Council with reference to the construction of waterworks and the supply of water, and for other purposes.
Shoreham Harbour Act 1937	1 Edw. 8 & 1 Geo. 6. c. cxxi	30 July 1937
An Act to confer further powers on the Shoreham Harbour Trustees, and for other purposes.
Southampton Corporation Act 1937	1 Edw. 8 & 1 Geo. 6. c. cxxii	30 July 1937
An Act to empower the Mayor Aldermen and Burgesses of the Borough of Southampton to provide and work trolley vehicle services and to acquire lands and to make further provision with regard to the health local government and improvement of the borough, and for other purposes.
Staffordshire Potteries Water Board Act 1937	1 Edw. 8 & 1 Geo. 6. c. cxxiii	30 July 1937
An Act to confer further powers upon the Staffordshire Potteries Water Board; to empower the Board to construct further waterworks; to redefine the limits of the Board for the supply of water; to make further provision with regard to the water undertaking of the Board and the supply of water by them; to amend the Acts of the Board, and for other purposes.
Watford Corporation Act 1937	1 Edw. 8 & 1 Geo. 6. c. cxxiv	30 July 1937
An Act to empower the Mayor Aldermen and Burgesses of the Borough of Watford to acquire part of the undertaking of the Rickmansworth and Uxbridge Valley Water Company; to make better provision with respect to the laying and maintenance of pipes for the supply of water by the said Mayor Aldermen and Burgesses and for purposes connected therewith; to confer further powers upon them with reference to their water and electricity undertakings; to make further provision with regard to the health local government and improvement of the borough, and for other purposes.
Bristol Transport Act 1937	1 Edw. 8 & 1 Geo. 6. c. cxxv	30 July 1937
An Act to confirm an agreement between the Bristol Corporation and the Bristol Tramways and Carriage Company Limited for the transfer to the said Corporation of the tramway and light railway undertaking of the said Company and for the provision and joint working of stage carriages and express carriages by the said Corporation and the said Company; to confer powers upon the said Corporation in connection with the operating and abandonment of tramways and light railways and the running of stage carriages and express carriages; to empower the said Corporation to borrow money, and for other purposes.
Canvey Island Urban District Council Act 1937 (repealed)	1 Edw. 8 & 1 Geo. 6. c. cxxvi	30 July 1937
An Act to make further and better provision for the improvement health local government and finance of the Urban District of Canvey Island, and for other purposes. (Repealed by Essex Act 1987 (c. xx))
Dartford Tunnel Act 1937 (repealed)	1 Edw. 8 & 1 Geo. 6. c. cxxvii	30 July 1937
An Act to authorise a variation of the works authorised by the Dartford Tunnel Act 1930 (Note: Dartford Tunnel Act 1930 (20 & 21 Geo. 5. c. clxxxii)) to amend that Act in certain respects and for other purposes. (Repealed by Dartford Tunnel Act 1967 (c. xxxvii))
Liverpool United Hospital Act 1937	1 Edw. 8 & 1 Geo. 6. c. cxxviii	30 July 1937
An Act to amalgamate the Liverpool Royal Infirmary the David Lewis Northern Hospital the Royal Southern Hospital and the Liverpool Stanley Hospital; to make provision with respect to the property and funds of the said hospitals; to provide for the incorporation of the governing body of the amalgamated hospitals, and for other purposes.
Saint Paul's and Saint James' Churches (Sheffield) Act 1937	1 Edw. 8 & 1 Geo. 6. c. cxxix	30 July 1937
An Act to provide for the closing of the Churches of certain benefices in the City of Sheffield and for the sale or disposal thereof and of the Churchyards appurtenant thereto; and for other purposes.
Cardiff Extension Act 1937	1 Edw. 8 & 1 Geo. 6. c. cxxx	30 July 1937
An Act to extend the boundaries of the City and County Borough of Cardiff, and for purposes incidental thereto.

== 1 & 2 Geo. 6 ==
The third session of the 37th Parliament of the United Kingdom, which met from 26 October 1937 until 4 November 1938.

This session was also traditionally cited as 1 & 2 G. 6.

=== Public general acts ===
Short title	Citation	Royal assent
Long title
Expiring Laws Continuance Act 1937 (repealed)	1 & 2 Geo. 6. c. 1	9 December 1937
An Act to continue certain expiring laws. (Repealed by Statute Law Revision Act 1950 (14 Geo. 6. c. 6))
Supreme Court of Judicature (Amendment) Act 1937 (repealed)	1 & 2 Geo. 6. c. 2	9 December 1937
An Act to amend the Supreme Court of Judicature (Consolidation) Act, 1925, (Note: Supreme Court of Judicature (Consolidation) Act 1925 (15 & 16 Geo. 5. c. 49)) by increasing to four the number of puisne judges that may be appointed to be attached to the Probate, Divorce and Admiralty Division of the High Court. (Repealed by Supreme Court of Judicature (Amendment) Act 1944 (7 & 8 Geo. 6. c. 9))
National Health Insurance (Juvenile Contributors and Young Persons) Act 1937 (repealed)	1 & 2 Geo. 6. c. 3	9 December 1937
An Act to amend the National Health Insurance Act, 1936, (Note: National Health Insurance Act 1936 (26 Geo. 5 & 1 Edw. 8. c. 32)) so as to make certain persons under the age of sixteen eligible for medical benefit, to facilitate the provision of medical benefit to such persons and to other young persons, and for purposes connected with the matters aforesaid. (Repealed by National Insurance Act 1946 (9 & 10 Geo. 6. c. 67))
Merchant Shipping (Superannuation Contributions) Act 1937 (repealed)	1 & 2 Geo. 6. c. 4	9 December 1937
An Act to amend section one hundred and sixty-three of the Merchant Shipping Act, 1894, (Note: Merchant Shipping Act 1894 (57 & 58 Vict. c. 60)) as respects contributions out of wages to certain funds established for the provision of superannuation and other like benefits. (Repealed by Merchant Shipping Act 1970 (c. 36))
Quail Protection Act 1937 (repealed)	1 & 2 Geo. 6. c. 5	22 December 1937
An Act to prohibit the importation of the common quail during the close season. (Repealed by Protection of Birds Act 1954 (2 & 3 Eliz. 2. c. 30))
Air-Raid Precautions Act 1937 (repealed)	1 & 2 Geo. 6. c. 6	22 December 1937
An Act to secure that precautions shall be taken with a view to the protection of persons and property from injury or damage in the event of hostile attack from the air. (Repealed by Statute Law (Repeals) Act 1976 (c. 16))
Public Works Loans (No. 2) Act 1937 (repealed)	1 & 2 Geo. 6. c. 7	22 December 1937
An Act to grant money for the purpose of certain local loans out of the Local Loans Fund, and for other purposes relating to local loans. (Repealed by National Loans Act 1968 (c. 13))

=== Local acts ===
Short title	Citation	Royal assent
Long title
Rutherglen Burgh Order Confirmation Act 1937	1 & 2 Geo. 6. c. i	9 December 1937
An Act to confirm a Provisional Order under the Private Legislation Procedure (Scotland) Act 1936 (Note: Private Legislation Procedure (Scotland) Act 1936 (26 Geo. 5 & 1 Edw. 8. c. 52)) relating to Rutherglen Burgh.
	Rutherglen Burgh Order 1937 Provisional Order to extend the municipal and police boundaries of the royal burgh of Rutherglen in the county of Lanark and for other purposes.	
Hamilton Burgh Order Confirmation Act 1937	1 & 2 Geo. 6. c. ii	9 December 1937
An Act to confirm a Provisional Order under the Private Legislation Procedure (Scotland) Act 1936 relating to Hamilton Burgh.
	Hamilton Burgh Order 1937 Provisional Order to extend the municipal and police boundaries of the burgh of Hamilton in the county of Lanark to apply to the extended burgh the provisions of the local Acts and Orders relating to the existing burgh and to make other provisions in relation thereto and for other purposes.	
Clydebank Burgh Order Confirmation Act 1937	1 & 2 Geo. 6. c. iii	9 December 1937
An Act to confirm a Provisional Order under the Private Legislation Procedure (Scotland) Act 1936 relating to Clydebank Burgh.
	Clydebank Burgh Order 1937 Provisional Order to extend the boundaries of the burgh of Clydebank to make provision with respect to the local government and health of the said burgh and for other purposes.	
Empire Exhibition (Scotland) Order Confirmation Act 1937 (repealed)	1 & 2 Geo. 6. c. iv	22 December 1937
An Act to confirm a Provisional Order under the Private Legislation Procedure (Scotland) Act 1936 relating to Empire Exhibition (Scotland). (Repealed by Statute Law (Repeals) Act 1998 (c. 43))
	Empire Exhibition (Scotland) Order 1937 Provisional Order to make special provision in the matter of the application of the Licensing (Scotland) Acts 1903 to 1934 to the Empire Exhibition to be held in Scotland and for other purposes.	
Rothesay Harbour Order Confirmation Act 1937	1 & 2 Geo. 6. c. v	22 December 1937
An Act to confirm a Provisional Order under the Private Legislation Procedure (Scotland) Act 1936 relating to Rothesay Harbour.
	Rothesay Harbour Order 1937 Provisional Order to authorise the Rothesay Harbour Trustees to execute certain works at the harbour to confer upon them further powers to authorise the provost magistrates and councillors of the royal burgh of Rothesay to levy a special rate in respect of Rothesay harbour and for other purposes.	
Glasgow Boundaries Order Confirmation Act 1937	1 & 2 Geo. 6. c. vi	22 December 1937
An Act to confirm a Provisional Order under the Private Legislation Procedure (Scotland) Act 1936 relating to Glasgow Boundaries.
	Glasgow Boundaries Order 1937 Provisional order to extend the boundaries of the city and royal burgh of Glasgow and of the county of the city of Glasgow and to alter and adjust the boundaries of the counties of Lanark Renfrew and Dunbarton and for other purposes.	

== See also ==
- List of acts of the Parliament of the United Kingdom
