= Special Area =

Special Area may refer to:

- Special Area of Conservation, a protection area for fauna and flora designated by the European Union
- Special Areas Board, Alberta, Canada, which governs three rural municipalities
  - Special Area No. 2
  - Special Area No. 3
  - Special Area No. 4
- Special areas in Hong Kong, also called country parks
  - Lai Chi Wo Special Area
  - Ma Shi Chau Special Area
  - Tai Po Kau Special Area
  - Tsiu Hang Special Area
  - Tung Lung Fort Special Area
- Special Flight Rules Area, a region in the United States where the normal rules of flight do not apply
- Special Landscape Area, conservation designation used by local government in the United Kingdom
- Special Protection Area, a protection area for wild birds designated by the European Union

Special Areas Act may refer to:

- Special Areas Act 1934, Britain, to give aid to areas with high unemployment rates
- Special Areas (Amendment) Act of 1937, Britain, to encourage business after the Special Areas Act 1934
- Special Areas Act 1938, Alberta, Canada, to establish 3.2 million hectares of special areas
