= 1934 in the United Kingdom =

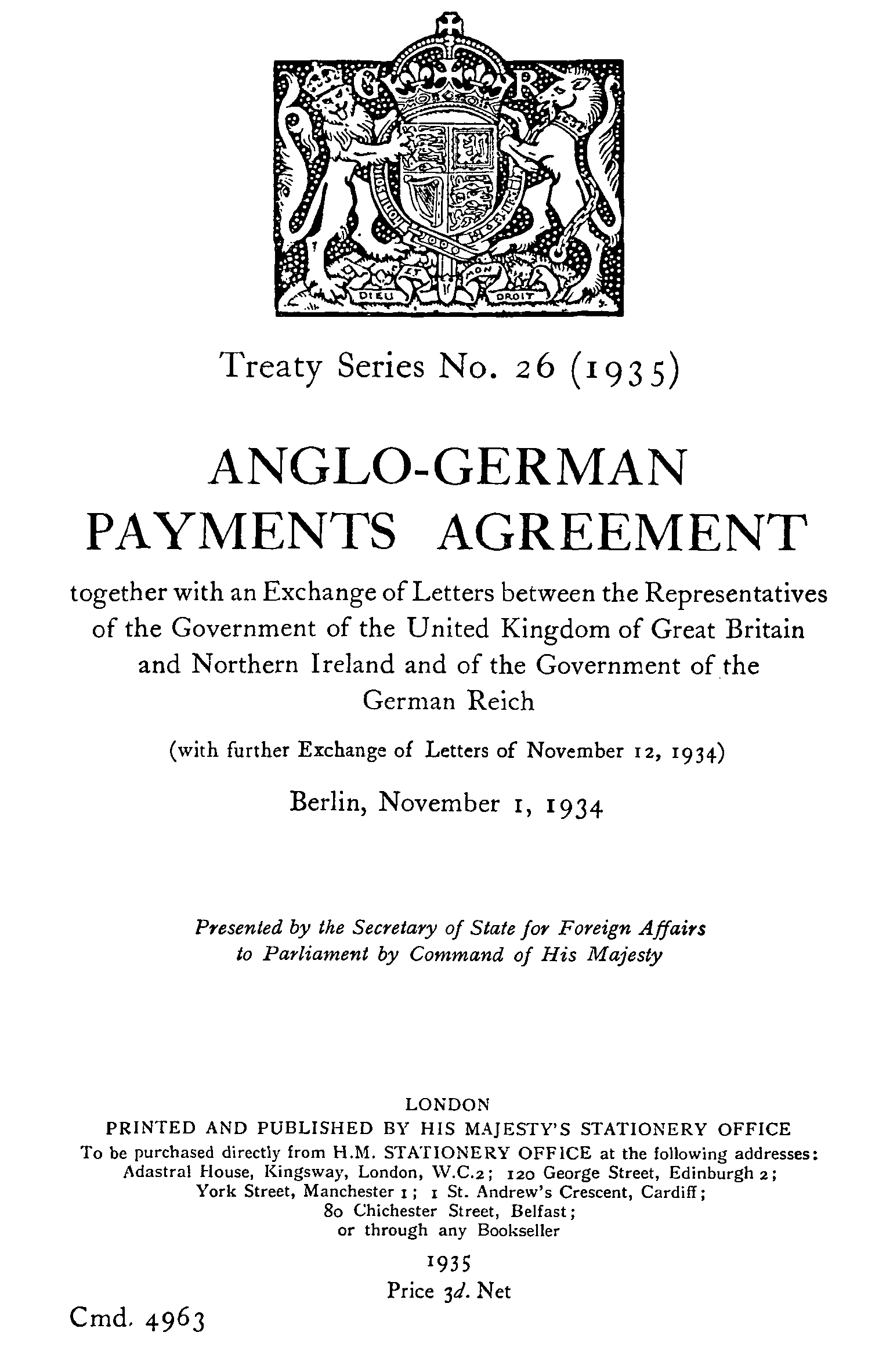
The cover page of the Anglo-German Payments Agreement (1934) between Nazi Germany and the United Kingdom.

Events from the year 1934 in the United Kingdom.

== Incumbents ==
- Monarch – George V
- Prime Minister – Ramsay MacDonald (Coalition)

== Events ==
- 1 January – Establishment of the National Council for Civil Liberties by Ronald Kidd and Sylvia Crowther-Smith.
- 21 January – Ten thousand people attend a British Union of Fascists rally in Birmingham, organised by Oswald Mosley.
- 16 February – A Commission of Government for the Dominion of Newfoundland is sworn in as a form of return to direct colonial rule by the UK forced by the island's economic collapse.
- 27 March – The Betting and Lotteries Act 1934 is passed. Part 1 (betting) is designed to restrict betting on racecourses and tracks to a maximum of 104 days. Part 2 (lotteries) prohibits the sale of lottery tickets, primarily directed against the Irish Free State Hospitals' Sweepstake.
- April – Meccano Ltd introduce the first Dinky Toys.
- 3 April – Percy Shaw patents the cat's eye road-safety device.
- 6 April – Rudyard Kipling and William Butler Yeats are awarded the Gothenburg Prize for Poetry.
- 21 April
  - The "surgeon's photograph" of the Loch Ness Monster, much later admitted to be a hoax, is published in the Daily Mail.
  - David Low's cartoon character Colonel Blimp first appears in the London Evening Standard.
- May – The London Zoo penguin pool, designed by Berthold Lubetkin's Tecton Architectural Group with Ove Arup, one of the most significant examples of modern architecture in Britain, is opened.
- 4 May – 54-year-old grandmother Mrs G. E. Alington becomes the first woman in Britain to complete a parachute jump, skydiving from 1500 feet over Brooklands Aerodrome.
- 28 May – Opening of the first Glyndebourne Festival Opera season.
- 29 May – First regular domestic airmail service, inaugurated by Highland Airways between Inverness and Kirkwall.
- 12 July – Petroleum (Production) Act vests ownership of all U.K. subterranean oil and natural gas in the Crown.
- 18 July – Opening of the Queensway Tunnel beneath the River Mersey by King George V.
- 19 July – 41 squadrons added to the Royal Air Force as part of a new air defence program.
- 4–11 August – British Empire Games held at Wembley Park, London.
- 6 September – The BBC's most powerful long-wave transmitter, Droitwich Transmitting Station, starts transmitting regularly at 200 kilohertz, following test transmissions from 8 May.
- 10 September – The British Graham Land Expedition sets out to explore Graham Land in Antarctica.
- 22 September – Gresford disaster: a gas explosion takes place at Gresford Colliery in Wrexham, north-east Wales, which leads to the death of 266 miners and rescuers, one of the worst tragedies in Welsh mining history.
- 26 September – Launch of the liner RMS Queen Mary at Clydebank.
- 29 September – Stanley Matthews makes his debut for the England national football team, beginning a record 23-year international career.
- 29 November – Marriage of Prince George, Duke of Kent, to Princess Marina of Greece and Denmark, the first this century, and last, foreign-born princess to marry into the British royal family; the wedding is the first to be broadcast live on radio.
- 30 November – London and North Eastern Railway steam locomotive Class A3 4472 Flying Scotsman becomes the first officially to exceed 100 miles per hour (160.9 km/h) on test in England.
- 10 December – Arthur Henderson wins the Nobel Peace Prize.
- 21 December – Special Areas Act provides grants from central government funds to assist regions with high unemployment.

=== Undated ===
- The "British Committee for Relations with Other Countries", which will become the British Council, is set up to foster cultural relations.
- Aero Pictorial, a British aerial photography company is founded.
- EKCO introduces its distinctive round bakelite radio cabinets.

== Publications ==
- John Betjeman's guidebook Cornwall, first of the Shell Guides.
- Agatha Christie's novels Murder on the Orient Express (featuring Hercule Poirot) and Why Didn't They Ask Evans?.
- Robert Graves' novel I, Claudius.
- A. P. Herbert's satirical novel Holy Deadlock.
- James Hilton's novel Goodbye, Mr. Chips.
- George Orwell's memoir Burmese Days.
- J. B. Priestley's travelogue English Journey.
- Dorothy L. Sayers' Lord Peter Wimsey novel The Nine Tailors.
- Dylan Thomas' first collection 18 Poems, including "The Force that Through the Green Fuse Drives the Flower".
- P. L. Travers' first children's story Mary Poppins.
- Geoffrey Trease's children's story Bows against the Barons.
- Evelyn Waugh's novel A Handful of Dust.
- P. G. Wodehouse's Thank You, Jeeves and Right Ho, Jeeves, the first Jeeves stories written as full-length novels.
- V. M. Yeates' war novel Winged Victory.

== Births ==
- 3 January – Bryan Kelly, musician (died 2026)
- 6 January – Sylvia Syms, actress (died 2023)
- 8 January – Roy Kinnear, actor (died 1988)
- 11 January – Tony Hoare, computer scientist (died 2026)
- 12 January – Mick Sullivan, English rugby league footballer (died 2016)
- 14 January
  - Richard Briers, actor (died 2013)
  - Priscilla Morgan, actress
- 18 January – Raymond Briggs, writer and illustrator (died 2022)
- 19 January – Ron Newman, British-born American soccer player and manager (died 2018)
- 20 January – Tom Baker, actor
- 22 January – Graham Kerr, TV cook
- 25 January – George William Coventry, 11th Earl of Coventry, peer (died 2002)
- 29 January – Noel Harrison, singer, actor and Olympic skier (died 2013)
- 2 February – Hugh McIlvanney, sports journalist (died 2019)
- 6 February – Roger Becker, tennis player (died 2017)
- 11 February – John Surtees, racing driver and motorcyclist (died 2017)
- 12 February – Anthony Howard, journalist (died 2010)
- 17 February – Alan Bates, actor (died 2003)
- 18 February – Geraldine Newman, actress
- 19 February – David Jones, film director (died 2008)
- 21 February – Michael Grylls, politician (died 2001)
- 24 February – Ray Honeyford, head teacher (died 2012)
- 25 February
  - Bernard Bresslaw, actor (died 1993)
  - Nicholas Edwards, Baron Crickhowell, politician (died 2018)
- 28 February – Ronnie Moran, football captain (Liverpool F.C.) (died 2017)
- 4 March – John Dunn, radio presenter (died 2004)
- 5 March – Nicholas Smith, actor (died 2015)
- 6 March – John Noakes, children's television presenter (died 2017)
- 7 March – Zena Walker, actress (died 2003)
- 8 March
  - Gawaine Baillie, race car driver and industrialist (died 2003)
  - John McLeod, Scottish composer (died 2022)
- 11 March – Dilys Laye, actress and screenwriter (died 2009)
- 15 March – Richard Layard, Baron Layard, economist
- 16 March – Roger Norrington, conductor (died 2025)
- 20 March – Eric Hebborn, art forger (died 1996)
- 22 March – Larry Martyn, comic actor (died 1994)
- 26 March
  - Richard Harris, scriptwriter
  - Norman Reynolds, production designer and film director (died 2023)
- 28 March – Laurie Taitt, Olympic sprint hurdler (died 2006)
- 29 March – Delme Bryn-Jones, baritone (died 2001)
- 1 April – Marie Patterson, English trade union leader (died 2021)
- 2 April – Brian Glover, actor and wrestler (died 1997)
- 3 April – Jane Goodall, primatologist (died 2025)
- 6 April – Brian Cosgrove, animator
- 7 April
  - Ian Richardson, actor (died 2007)
  - Roger Webb, jazz musician (died 2002)
- 8 April – Bernard Donoughue, Baron Donoughue, politician and academic
- 11 April – Ron Pember, actor and dramatist (died 2022)
- 16 April
  - Vince Hill, singer (died 2023)
  - Michael Jackson, British-born American radio broadcaster (died 2022)
  - Richard Kershaw, journalist (died 2014)
  - Geoffrey Owen, journalist, academic and businessman
- 3 May – Henry Cooper, boxer (died 2011)
- 5 May – Jim Reid, folk musician (died 2009)
- 8 May – David Williamson, Baron Williamson of Horton, English soldier and politician (died 2015)
- 9 May
  - Alan Bennett, playwright, screenwriter, actor and author
  - David Plastow, English businessman (died 2019)
  - Peter Ramsden, rugby league player (died 2002)
- 14 May – Alasdair Macintosh Geddes, infectious diseases expert (died 2024)
- 15 May
  - John Keegan, military historian (died 2012)
  - George Roper, comedian (died 2003)
- 16 May
  - Victor Emery, physicist (died 2002)
  - Nicholas Goodison (died 2021)
- 24 May
  - Barry Rose, choir director and organist
  - Margaret Tebbit, nurse (died 2020)
- 26 May
  - Jeffrey Alan Gray, psychologist (died 2004)
  - Mike Rawson, track and field athlete (died 2000)
- 29 May – Nanette Newman, actress
- 5 June – Bryon Butler, sports journalist (died 2001)
- 6 June – Joanne Cole, artist (died 1985)
- 11 June – Lady Annabel Goldsmith, socialite (died 2025)
- 12 June – John Townend, politician (died 2018)
- 15 June – Eileen Atkins, actress
- 19 June
  - Terence Clark, soldier and diplomat, British Ambassador to Iraq
  - Brian London, boxer (died 2021)
- 20 June
  - Brian Barder, diplomat (died 2017)
  - Keith Hopkins, historian and sociologist (died 2004)
- 21 June
  - Maggie Jones, actress (died 2009)
  - Ken Matthews, race walker (died 2019)
- 23 June – Keith Sutton, bishop (died 2017)
- 24 June
  - Rodney Peppé, author and illustrator (died 2022)
  - Peter Stoddart, English cricketer (died 2019)
- 26 June – Jeremy Wolfenden, journalist and spy (died 1965)
- 30 June – Richard Jolly, development economist
- 1 July
  - Paddy Jones, salsa dancer
  - Jean Marsh, actress (died 2025)
  - Ian Robinson, publisher (died 2004)
- 2 July – Tom Springfield, songwriter and record producer (died 2022)
- 4 July – James Hamilton, 5th Duke of Abercorn, British nobleman, peer and politician
- 5 July – Philip Madoc, actor (died 2012)
- 7 July
  - Robert McNeill Alexander, zoologist (died 2016)
  - Richard Taylor, medical doctor, politician and Royal Air Force officer (died 2024)
- 8 July – Marty Feldman, writer, comedian and actor (died 1982)
- 9 July – John Clegg, Indian-born English actor (died 2024)
- 11 July – Helen Cresswell, writer (died 2005)
- 13 July – Gordon Lee, football player and manager (died 2022)
- 14 July – John Tyndall, politician (died 2005)
- 15 July – Harrison Birtwistle, composer (died 2022)
- 21 July – Jonathan Miller, polymath theatre director (died 2019)
- 23 July – Tony Lee, jazz pianist (died 2004)
- 26 July – Anthony Gilbert, composer (died 2023)
- 27 July – John Pardoe, politician and businessman
- 28 July
  - Pat Douthwaite, artist (died 2002)
  - Ron Flowers, footballer (died 2021)
- 31 July – Julia Bodmer, geneticist (died 2001)
- 6 August
  - Chris Bonington, mountaineer
  - Billy Boston, rugby league player (died 2026)
- 8 August – Keith Barron, actor (died 2017)
- 13 August – Ken Friar, football executive (died 2026)
- 14 August - Trevor Bannister, actor (died 2011)
- 16 August
  - Angela Buxton, tennis player (died 2020)
  - Diana Wynne Jones, English writer (died 2011)
- 18 August
  - Ronnie Carroll, Northern Irish singer (died 2015)
  - Michael de Larrabeiti, writer (died 2008)
- 19 August – Ronald Jones, track and field athlete (died 2021)
- 20 August – Tom Mangold, journalist and author
- 2 September – Allen Carr, writer and anti-smoking campaigner (died 2006)
- 4 September
  - Tony Book, football player and manager (died 2025)
  - Clive Granger, economist, Nobel Prize laureate (died 2009)
- 5 September – Russell Harty, television presenter (died 1988)
- 8 September – Peter Maxwell Davies, composer (died 2016)
- 11 September
  - Ian Abercrombie, English-American actor (died 2012)
  - Kallistos Ware, Eastern Orthodox theologian and bishop (died 2022)
  - Cedric Price, architect and writer (died 2003)
- 17 September – Robin Ray, broadcaster (died 1998)
- 19 September
  - Brian Epstein, manager of The Beatles (died 1967)
  - Austin Mitchell, politician (died 2021)
- 20 September – David Marquand, academic and politician (died 2024)
- 21 September – David J. Thouless, Scottish-born condensed-matter physicist, Nobel Prize laureate (died 2019)
- 24 September
  - Tommy Anderson, Scottish footballer (died 2018)
  - Robert Lang, English stage, television actor (died 2004)
- 26 September – Dick Heckstall-Smith, jazz saxophonist (died 2004)
- 30 September
  - Alan A'Court, English footballer (died 2009)
  - Anna Kashfi, Welsh actress (died 2015)
- 1 October – Geoff Stephens, songwriter and record producer (died 2020)
- 3 October – Tom Hustler, photographer (died 2006)
- 14 October – Rose Wylie, painter
- 17 October – Alan Garner, young adult fiction writer
- 20 October
  - Maureen Cleave, journalist (died 2021)
  - Timothy West, actor (died 2024)
- 24 October – Wally Herbert, explorer (died 2007)
- 27 October
  - David and Frederick Barclay, businessmen (David died 2021)
  - Peter Donaldson, economist (died 2002)
- 14 November – Dave Mackay, Scottish footballer (died 2015)
- 19 November – David Lloyd-Jones, conductor (died 2022)
- 22 November – Nicolas Walter, anarchist writer (died 2000)
- 25 November – John Drummond, arts administrator (died 2006)
- 28 November – Ted Walker, poet, travel writer and broadcaster (died 2004)
- 1 December – Jane Heathcote-Drummond-Willoughby, 28th Baroness Willoughby de Eresby, peer
- 3 December – Bob Cryer, politician (died 1994)
- 9 December – Judi Dench, actress
- 16 December – Jim Parker, composer (died 2023)
- 17 December – Ray Wilson, footballer (died 2018)
- 18 December – John Bingham, 7th Earl of Lucan (disappeared 1974)
- 27 December – Pat Moss, racing driver (died 2008)
- 28 December
  - Alasdair Gray, Scottish fiction writer and artist (died 2019)
  - Maggie Smith, English actress (died 2024)
- 31 December – George Christie, opera manager (died 2014)

== Deaths ==
- 6 January – Herbert Chapman, football manager (born 1878)
- 23 January
  - Charles McLaren, 1st Baron Aberconway, politician and jurist (born 1850)
  - Sir William Hardy, biologist and food scientist (born 1864)
- 23 February – Sir Edward Elgar, composer (born 1857)
- 10 March – Thomas Anstey Guthrie, comic novelist 'F. Anstey' (born 1856)
- 25 March – Edmund Selous, ornithologist and writer (born 1857)
- 11 April – John Collier, writer and Pre-Raphaelite painter (born 1850)
- 25 May – Gustav Holst, composer (born 1874)
- 10 June – Frederick Delius, composer (born 1862)
- 10 September – Sir George Henschel, musician (born 1850)
- 27 September – Ellen Willmott, horticulturalist (born 1858)
- 3 November – Sir Robert McAlpine, 1st Baronet, builder (born 1847)
- 16 November – Alice Hargreaves, née Alice Liddell, inspiration for Alice's Adventures in Wonderland (born 1852)
- 25 November – N. E. Brown, English plant taxonomist (born 1849)

== See also ==
- List of British films of 1934
