= Rose baronets of Leith (1935) =

The Rose baronetcy, of Leith in the County of the City of Edinburgh, was created in the Baronetage of the United Kingdom on 2 July 1935 for the Scottish public servant Arthur Rose, Commissioner for Special Areas for Scotland under the Special Areas Act 1934. The title became extinct on the death of the 2nd Baronet in 1976.

== Rose baronets, of Leith (1935) ==
- Sir (Hugh) Arthur Rose, 1st Baronet (1875–1937)
- Sir Hugh Rose, 2nd Baronet (1907–1976), died leaving no male heir.

Coat of arms of Rose of Leith
Crest A falcon proper Escutcheon Or, two water bougets in chief and in base an ancient galley with two masts, sails furled sable, flagged gules, seated therein the Virgin Mary with the infant Saviour in her arms, all proper. Motto Constant and true
