= 1934 in British television =

This is a list of events related to British television in 1934.

== Events ==
- 31 March – The agreement for joint experimental transmissions by the BBC and John Logie Baird's company comes to an end.
- 16 May – The Seldon Committee is established to investigate the feasibility of a public television service in the UK.

== Births ==
- 8 January – Roy Kinnear, actor (died 1988)
- 14 January – Richard Briers, actor (died 2013)
- 20 January – Tom Baker, actor
- 12 February – Annette Crosbie, Scottish actor
- 17 February – Alan Bates, actor (died 2003)
- 24 February – Doreen Sloane, actor (died 1990)
- 2 April – Brian Glover, actor and wrestler (died 1997)
- 7 April – Ian Richardson, actor (died 2007)
- 3 May – Henry Cooper, boxer and Question of Sport team captain (died 2011)
- 9 May – Alan Bennett, actor and writer
- 15 May – George Roper, comedian (died 2003)
- 1 July – Jean Marsh, actress (died 2025)
- 5 July – Philip Madoc, actor (died 2012)
- 8 July – Marty Feldman, writer, comedian and actor (died 1982)
- 8 August – Keith Barron, actor and television presenter (died 2017)
- 20 August – Tom Mangold, investigative reporter
- 20 October – Timothy West, actor (died 2024)
- 9 December – Judi Dench, actress
- 28 December – Maggie Smith, actress (died 2024)
- Anita West, actress and television presenter

== See also ==
- 1934 in British music
- 1934 in the United Kingdom
- List of British films of 1934
