= 1934 in British music =

This is a summary of 1934 in music in the United Kingdom.

== Events ==
- February – Sir Edward Elgar dies and is buried next to his wife at St Wulstan's Roman Catholic Church in Little Malvern. Elgar leaves behind 130 pages of notes which Anthony Payne uses to reconstruct his unfinished Third Symphony; it would be premièred in 1998. Elgar is replaced as Master of the King's Music by Sir Walford Davies.
- 28 May – Opening of the first Glyndebourne Festival Opera season.
- June – Sir Henry Lytton retires from the D'Oyly Carte Opera Company.

== Popular music ==
- "The Bluebird Of Happiness" w. Edward Heyman & Harry Parr-Davies m. Sandor Hamati
- "Home, James, and Don't Spare the Horses", by Fred Hillebrand, recorded by Jay Wilbur and later by Elsie Carlisle, with Ambrose and his Orchestra
- "If (They Made Me a King)", music by Tolchard Evans and lyrics by Robert Hargreaves and Stanley J. Damerell
- "I'll Follow My Secret Heart" w.m. Noël Coward, Introduced by Noël Coward and Yvonne Printemps in the musical Conversation Piece
- Albert Ketèlbey – From a Japanese Screen

== Recordings ==
- Sam Browne, Ambrose and his Orchestra – "Stay As Sweet As You Are"
- Stanley Holloway – "With Her Head Tucked Underneath Her Arm"

== Classical music: new works ==
- Arnold Bax
  - Clarinet Sonata
  - Northern Ballad No. 2
- Frank Bridge – A Merry, Merry Xmas
- Benjamin Britten
  - Simple Symphony
  - Te Deum in C
- Edward German – Cloverley Suite
- Walter Leigh – Concertino for Harpsichord and String Orchestra
- William Reed – Homage to Delius, for string sextet
- Ralph Vaughan Williams – Suite for Viola and Orchestra

== Opera ==
- Gustav Holst – The Wandering Scholar
- Michael Tippett – Robin Hood

== Film and Incidental music ==
- Arthur Bliss – Things to Come
- Ernest Irving – Autumn Crocus

== Musical theatre ==
- 19 February – The revue Yours Sincerely, starring Binnie Barnes opens at Daly's Theatre.
- 31 March – Sporting Love opens at the Gaiety Theatre and runs for 302 performances.
- 27 September – London production of Yes, Madam? (Music: Jack Waller and Joseph Tunbridge Lyrics: R. P. Weston and Bert Lee Book: R. P. Weston, Bert Lee and R. G. Browne) opens at the Hippodrome and runs for 302 performances

== Musical films ==
- Blossom Time starring Richard Tauber
- Boots! Boots! starring George Formby and Beryl Formby, and featuring Betty Driver and Harry Hudson & his Band
- Evergreen, produced by Michael Balcon, starring Jessie Matthews
- Music Hall, starring George Carney, with music by W. L. Trytel
- The Broken Melody, starring John Garrick, Margot Grahame and Merle Oberon, with music by W. L. Trytel

== Births ==
- 13 January – Geoff Bradford, guitarist (died 2013)
- 29 January – Noel Harrison, singer and actor (died 2013)
- 4 March – John Churchill Dunn, DJ (died 2004)
- 8 March – John McLeod, composer (died 2022)
- 29 March – Delme Bryn-Jones, operatic baritone (died 2001)
- 7 April – Victor Feldman, jazz musician (died 1987)
- 5 May – Jim Reid, folk musician (died 2009)
- 9 May – Roy Massey, organist and conductor
- 24 May – Barry Rose, choir-trainer and organist
- 3 June – Bob Wallis, jazz musician (died 1991)
- 2 July – Tom Springfield, singer-songwriter and producer (The Springfields)
- 15 July – Harrison Birtwistle, composer
- 26 July – Anthony Gilbert, composer
- 8 September – Peter Maxwell Davies, composer (died 2016)
- 19 September – Brian Epstein, manager of the Beatles (died 1967)
- 26 September – Geoffrey Grey, composer
- 30 September – Sheila Tracy, trombonist and radio presenter (died 2014)
- 1 November – William Mathias, composer (died 1992)
- 15 November – Peter Dickinson, English pianist and composer
- 20 November – Colin Smith, jazz trumpeter (died 2004)
- 4 December – Chas McDevitt, skiffle musician
- 9 December – Alan Ridout, composer (died 1996)
- 16 December – Jim Parker, composer (died 2023)

== Deaths ==
- 23 February – Sir Edward Elgar, composer, 76
- 25 February – Daniel Protheroe, composer and conductor, 67
- 3 March – George Ratcliffe Woodward, poet and composer, 85
- 7 May – Edward Naylor, organist and composer, 67
- 25 May – Gustav Holst, composer, 59 (complications following surgery)
- 10 June
  - Frederick Delius, composer, 82
  - Julia Gwynne, opera singer, 77
- 11 August – Kalitha Dorothy Fox, composer, 40
- 10 September – George Henschel, German-born baritone singer, pianist, conductor and composer, 84
- 24 September – Edwin Lemare, organist and composer, 69

== See also ==
- 1934 in British television
- 1934 in the United Kingdom
- List of British films of 1934
