= Tom Hustler =

English soldier and photographer

Thomas William Mostyn Hustler (1934–2006) was an English society photographer, who photographed weddings and royalty..

Hustler was born at Acklam Hall, his family's ancestral home in North Yorkshire, England, on 3 October 1934. He was educated at Aysgarth School and Eton College and, from 1952, underwent National Service, during which he saw action against communist insurgents in the Malayan Emergency as a lieutenant in the Somerset Light Infantry.

As a photographer, he took pictures of Prince Charles and Princess Anne for National Savings stamps.

Featured in One of Michael Winner's early film Girls, Girls, Girls, 1961 .He appeared as a castaway on the BBC Radio programme Desert Island Discs on 31 May 1975.

He died in Wokingham, Berkshire on 24 July 2006.

== Bibliography ==
- —— (1963). Tom Hustler on photography. Evans Bros.
- —— (1967). Sweet Charity Picture Book.
- —— (1979). How I Photograph People. Focal Press. ISBN 978-0240510279.
