= Aero Pictorial =

British aerial photography company

Aero Pictorial Ltd was a British aerial photography company in operation between 1934–1939 and then 1946-1960. It was founded by Aerofilms photographer Cyril Murrell (1899–1958) who primarily worked as the main photographer. In his later years, Murrell flew from Elstree Aerodrome in Hertfordshire. Murrell became known as "one of the most famous and daring air photographers."

During the 1930s through the 1950s, the Aero Pictorial studio was located at 136 Regent Street, Westminster London, England.

Pre-war photos were taken on 4 in × 5 in (100 mm × 130 mm) glass plates, whilst post-war, similar-sized roll film was used. This large negative format meant the majority of photos were very sharp and detailed.

After Murrell died in 1958, the company was merged with Aerofilms and ceased operating in 1960. Aerofilms acquired the archives of Aero Pictorials Ltd. The Aerofilms archive was sold in 2007 to English Heritage (with support from the Royal Commission on the Ancient and Historical Monuments of Wales).

The 2008 publication British Seaside Piers, by Chris Mawson (former Librarian at Aerofilms) and Richard Riding (editor of Aeroplane magazine from 1973-1998), was dedicated to Murrell as the book features a large number of aerial shots of piers drawn from the Aero Pictorial archive.

According to the National Collection of Aerial Photography, the photographs taken by Cyril Murrell's Aero Pictorial Ltd are among the "oldest and most valuable images of Scotland.

== Collections ==
Works by Aero Pictorial / Cyril Murrell are held in the following permanent collections and archives:

- New York Public Library
- Historic Environment Scotland
  - National Collection of Aerial Photography
  - trove.scot (Note: The collection of the Canmore National Record of the Historic Environment was transferred here in 2025.)
- University of Cambridge
- Newcastle University
- Amgueddfa Cymru – Museum Wales
- National Trust Collections
- Surrey History Centre
