= Special Areas (Amendment) Act 1937 =

Act of the Parliament of the United Kingdom

Special Areas (Amendment) Act 1937 (Note: Section 10.)
- Act of Parliament
- Parliament of the United Kingdom
- Long title: An Act to continue until the thirty-first day of March, nineteen hundred and thirty-nine, the Special Areas (Development and Improvement) Act, 1934, and to enable further assistance to be given to the areas specified in the First Schedule to that Act, and to certain other areas.
- Citation: 1 Edw. 8 & 1 Geo. 6. c. 31
- Territorial extent: United Kingdom

Dates
- Royal assent: 6 May 1937
- Commencement: 6 May 1937 (Note: The Acts of Parliament (Commencement) Act 1793.)
- Expired: 31 March 1939 (Note: Section 9.)
- Repealed: 15 June 1945
Other legislation
Amends	Special Areas (Development and Improvement) Act 1934
Repealed by	Distribution of Industry Act 1945

Status: Repealed

Text of statute as originally enacted

The Special Areas (Amendment) Act 1937 (1 Edw. 8 & 1 Geo. 6. c. 31) was an act of the Parliament of the United Kingdom which amended the Special Areas (Development and Improvement) Act 1934.

The new act introduced concessions on taxes and rents to encourage businesses to set up in the locations which benefited from the 1934 Act.

== Subsequent developments ==
The whole act was repealed by section 8(1) of the Distribution of Industry Act 1945 (8 & 9 Geo. 6. c. 36), which came into force on 15 June 1945. The same subsection repealed the 1934 act.
