= Ian Robinson (publisher) =

British writer and publisher

Ian Robinson (July 1, 1934 – April 20, 2004) was an English writer and artist and editor of Oasis Books.

== Biography ==
Ian Norman Baker Robinson was born in 1934 in Osterley. His father was a civil servant and his maternal grandfather was the Music Hall artist Anchor Baker. His secondary schooling was at St Paul's School in London where he secretly started writing poetry and eventually helped revive the magazine The Debator, founded by G.K.Chesterton and E.C.Bentley. Following national service in the RAF, when he was based in Germany and learned Russian, he studied English at Oriel College, Oxford. He then taught in a comprehensive school for three years before working for the National Trade Press as a technical reporter and sub-editor. It was during this period that he developed an interest in typography, lay-out and design.

In 1965 he joined the staff of what was then Kingston Art College, where he stayed working in various capacities through its several transformations until he took early retirement in 1991. After helping with the production of a student magazine there, he founded the literary magazine Oasis in 1969 and the following year produced the first in the Oasis Books series. Between 1972-82 he was a member of the Poetry Society, where he chaired the Publications Committee and for two years was Deputy Chairman following the dispute which led to the resignation of the radical group on its Governing Council. Although he sympathised with their outlook (and continued to publish some of them in Oasis), he chose to remain there for the time being.

Stimulated by working in an art college, Robinson was developing his own graphic work, which he began exhibiting during the 1970s. It also figured prominently in the various magazines in which he published or with which he was connected, as often as not "because I had difficulty finding suitable material from elsewhere without having to pay for it". A collection of some hundred of his drawings, “The Glacier in the Cupboard”, was published in 1995, followed by two minor collections. In his introduction to “The Glacier in the Cupboard”, Robert Vas Dias commented on the oneiric quality of his drawings at the same time as their being "exemplifications of ideas of order".

After his retirement Robinson continued to publish and devoted more time to his writing and graphic work. He died unexpectedly of a pulmonary embolism just short of his seventieth birthday. In 1959 he had married Adelheid (Heidi) Armbrüster, of Romanian German extraction, with whom he had a son (Max, 1963) and a daughter (Ira, 1967).

== Literary activity ==
Besides Oasis, Ian Robinson was connected with various other magazines at different times. These included two student magazines in the college where he worked; Athene, the journal of the Society for Education Through Art, of which he was art editor between 1972 and 1974; and PALPI, the twice-yearly listings of the Association of Little Presses, which he took over for its final issues between 1993 and 1996. Always innovatory, he abandoned Oasis after its third series in 1980 and started another magazine (Telegram, 1981–82) before collaborating with editors Robert Vas Dias (The Atlantic Review) and Tony Frazer (Shearsman) in launching the 14 issues of Ninth (later Tenth) Decade between 1983 and 1991. Meanwhile, Oasis had been kept up as an occasional trade journal advertising Oasis Books (the fourth series). The fifth series recommenced in 1989, followed by a sixth in 2000.

All these magazines were notable for their eclecticism. The poetry featured was never the product of a single trend but a showcase of the variety of writing in England at a time when the big publishing houses and mainline literary media were dominated by a narrow, self-serving clique. Beyond this, there was an interest in American writing; in translations of European poetry, often from minority cultures; and in prose poetry and experimental prose. Over a run of issues, the proportion of English-language verse to translations and to creative prose was on average a third of the space each. In addition some later issues of Oasis were thematic, featuring little visited areas such as Slovenian or French-Canadian poetry. Oasis Books were similarly eclectic and often gave first or prominent publication to a number of writers who went on to achieve commercial success, including John Ash, Lee Harwood, Matthew Sweeney, Elaine Randell and Frances Presley.

Ian Robinson's own poetry consisted in large part of understated notations of urban life that lead to a mood of alienation, either by their very bleakness or through a surrealistic shift of focus. His prose is richer in approach and generally challenges or undermines our habit of constructing a narrative out of events. What we take for reality is demonstrated as fictional at base. His later work concentrates more on dreams or the eruption of surrealistic procedures into straightforward narrative.

== Books ==
Poetry

- Accidents, London (Oasis Books), 1974. 120 copies, 1-20 signed. ISBN 0-903375-12-5
- Short Stories, Kingston upon Thames (Court Poetry Press), 1978. ISBN 0-906010-07-1
- Three, London (Tapocketa Press), 1978.
- Maida Vale Elegies, with drawings by Ray Seaford. Feltham (S Editions), 1983. ISBN 0-907037-01-1
- The Invention of Morning, with cover illustration by Robinson. Bradford (Redbeck Press), 1997. ISBN 0-946980-40-3

Prose

- "Histoire Naturelle" in London Magazine Stories 8. London Magazine Editions, 1973, pp. 82–91
- Fugitive Aromas, Higham Ferrars (Greylag Press), 1979. 150 copies, 1-40 signed.
- Obsequies, with illustrations by Robinson. Bradford (Blind Lion Books), 1979. ISBN 0-905689-05-4
- Blown Footage, Croydon (X Press), 1980.
- Delayed Frames, London (Oasis Books), 1985. ISBN 0-903375-67-2
- Dissolving Views, with illustrations by Robinson. Feltham (S Editions), 1986. ISBN 0-907037-02-X
- Journal, with introduction by Philip Crick. Budleigh Salterton (Interim Press), 1987. ISBN 0-904675-26-2
- A World Elsewhere, with a drawing by Ray Seaford. London (εidolon Press), 2002.
- How Do You Spell Bl..gh?, with illustrations by Stanley Engel and Ray Seaford. Bradford (Redbeck Press), 2002. ISBN 0-946980-97-7

Joint authorship with Ray Seaford

- Censored Mistletoe, with drawings by 'Friedrich Seifert'. Ostensibly by Eugen Dörfla and F. Seifert, translated by Freddie Sail; in reality by Robinson and Seaford. Feltham (S Editions), 1980.
- 26½ Things, with illustrations by Seaford. London (Oasis Series 101), 1996. ISBN 1-900996-00-6
- Thunder on the Dew, London (Oasis Books), 2000. ISBN 978-1-900996-09-9

Artwork

- The Glacier in the Cupboard, with introduction by Robert Vas Dias. London (S Editions/ Permanent Press), 1995. Drawings. ISBN 0-907037-06-2
- Landscapes - Ten Variations on a Theme, London (Oasis Books), 2001. Drawings. ISBN 1-900996-13-8; 2nd ed. Raunchland Publications online, 2002
- Theoremes, Turin, Italy (edito gennaio), 2001. Collages, copies I- 35 signed.
