= Distribution of Industry Act 1945 =

Act of the Parliament of the United Kingdom

Distribution of Industry Act 1945 (Note: Section 17(1).)
- Act of Parliament
- Parliament of the United Kingdom
- Long title: An Act to provide for the development of certain areas: for controlling the provision of industrial premises with a view to securing the proper distribution of industry; and for purposes connected with the matters aforesaid.
- Citation: 8 & 9 Geo. 6. c. 36
- Territorial extent: England and Wales; Scotland; (Note: Section 17(2).)

Dates
- Royal assent: 15 June 1945
- Commencement: 15 June 1945 (Note: The Acts of Parliament (Commencement) Act 1793.)
- Repealed: 1 April 1960 (Note: The Local Employment Act 1960 (Commencement) Order 1960 (SI 1960/562).)
Other legislation
Amended by	Town and Country Planning Act 1947; Town and Country Planning (Scotland) Act 1947
Repealed by	Local Employment Act 1960

Status: Repealed

Text of statute as originally enacted

The Distribution of Industry Act 1945 (8 & 9 Geo. 6. c. 36) was an act of the Parliament of the United Kingdom intended to help redevelop areas, such as south-western Scotland, which depended heavily on specific heavy industries, and which had been hard-hit by unemployment in the inter-war period.

Sections 6, 9 and 10 were repealed, as to England and Wales, by section 113(1) of, and part II of the ninth Schedule to, the Town and Country Planning Act 1947 (10 & 11 Geo. 6. c. 51). Sections 6, 9 and 10 were repealed, as to Scotland, by section 109 of, and part II of the ninth schedule to, the Town and Country Planning (Scotland) Act 1947 (10 & 11 Geo. 6. c. 53).

The whole act was repealed by section 28(1) of, and schedule 3 to, the Local Employment Act 1960 (8 & 9 Eliz. 2. c. 18).

== Contents ==
The act gave the government two main powers, namely:

- To schedule "development areas" where the Government was able to build factories for rental to private enterprise, and to manage industrial estates itself
- To require that the site for any factory above a certain size should be decided on by discussion between the firm proposing to build it and the Board of Trade.
- An attempt to diversify industry and end extreme specialization as it impacted industry in the 1920s.

This plan, mostly prepared by Hugh Dalton, the President of the Board of Trade, was contentious; it was felt by many to be encouraging a planned economy. John Sydney Wardlaw-Milne, a Conservative MP, described it in debate as "the very antithesis of private enterprise ... bureaucracy and Socialism carried to the last limit". The act was passed with the determination of not returning to pre-war conditions (such as high unemployment).

== Significance ==
From June 1945 to January 1950, some 481 government-built and 505 private-built installations (factories, factory extensions, etc.) were built in development areas under the Act, creating an estimated 200,000 jobs (40% of which were taken by women); unemployment in depressed areas fell from 550,000 before the War (July 1938) to under 100,000 in July 1950. A further 279 installations were under construction, with 356 approved but not yet under way; these were predominantly private projects.

The act had much more of an effect on British industry than the previous act passed in 1934

In Scotland, projects in the main Scottish Development Area in the central belt created 60,000 jobs by the beginning of 1950, with 15,000 elsewhere in the country; this was expected to rise to 120,000 once planned projects had been completed. Unemployment in the region stood at 41,000 (3½%), compared to 115,000 (12%) before the War. Outside the main development area, major projects included a new industrial estate in Dundee, diversifying local industry away from a dependence on jute, and the Inverness area becoming a scheduled area in 1948, to develop industry in tandem with a new hydro-electric power scheme.

In Wales, most of the industrial areas in South Wales were scheduled as a development area, along with the Wrexham region in the north. 264 installations had been built by May 1950, with 81 under construction and 104 approved; more than half of the factories completed had been Government-funded. Twenty-six of the factories built or planned were intended to provide special employment for those disabled through mining work.

One study found that only 18% of Industrial Development Certificate refusals resulted in the project being moved to a target area. Half were scaled down so as to escape IDC control and 31% were cancelled, reorganised or abandoned. When they were located in desired areas, they were often marked by poor performance due to being at the ends of long supply chains and lacking an experienced workforce.

== See also ==
- UK labour law

== Bibliography ==
- Facts and Figures for Socialists, 1951. Labour Party Research Department, London, 1950
- W P Frank. "The Distribution of Industry Act, 1945". The New Industrial Law. Thames Bank Publishing Company. 1950. Chapter 5. Page 43. Google.
- UK Parliament (ed). "Programming redevelopment after World War II"
- M M Wells (ed). "The Distribution of Industry Act, 1945". Halsbury's Statutes of England. (The Complete Statutes of England). Butterworth & Co (Publishers) Ltd. 1946. Volume 38: 1945: . Page 479.
- "The Distribution of Industry Act, 1945". Halsbury's Statutes of England. Second Edition. Butterworth & Co (Publishers) Ltd. 1951. Volume 25. Page 699.
- A N C Shelley and A D Yonge (eds). "Distribution of Industry Act, 1945". Local Government Law and Administration in England and Wales. Volume 23: 1945. Page 145.
- "Distribution of Industry Act, 1945". Loose-leaf Encyclopaedia of War Damage and Compensation. "Part 2". Page 1342/20. Google.
- "Distribution of Industry Act, 1945" (1945) 199 The Law Times 208 (23 June 1945)
- "Distribution of Industry Bill" in "Legislation" (1945) 199 The Law Times 80 (10 March 1945)
- "Current Topics" (1945) 89 The Solicitors' Journal 297 at 298 (30 June 1945)
- (1965) 90 International Labour Review 134
- "Employment under British Distribution of Industry Act, 1945" (1945) 61 Monthly Labor Review 1148
- "Distribution of Industry". The Statutory Rules and Orders Revised to December 31, 1948. HMSO. 1950. Volume 5. Page 871.
