= Special Areas (Development and Improvement) Act 1934 =

Act of the Parliament of the United Kingdom

Special Areas (Development and Improvement) Act 1934 (Note: Section 8(1).)
- Act of Parliament
- Parliament of the United Kingdom
- Long title: An Act to provide for the initiation, organisation, prosecution and assistance of measures designed to facilitate the economic development and social improvement of certain areas which have been specially affected by industrial depression; for the appointment of Commissioners for those purposes; and for purposes connected with the matters aforesaid.
- Citation: 25 & 26 Geo. 5. c. 1
- Territorial extent: England and Wales; Scotland; (Note: Section 8(2).)

Dates
- Royal assent: 21 December 1934
- Commencement: 21 December 1934 (Note: The Acts of Parliament (Commencement) Act 1793.)
- Expired: 31 March 1937 (Note: Section 8(3).)
- Repealed: 15 June 1945
Other legislation
Amended by	Special Areas (Amendment) Act 1937
Repealed by	Distribution of Industry Act 1945

Status: Repealed

Text of statute as originally enacted

The Special Areas (Development and Improvement) Act 1934 (25 & 26 Geo. 5. c. 1) was an act of the Parliament of the United Kingdom that gave aid to the areas of Britain which had the highest unemployment rates in the 1930s.

Areas which benefited included South Wales, Tyneside, Cumberland and southern Scotland; but not Lancashire. There were two unpaid commissioners, one for Scotland, one for England and Wales, given responsibility to spend £2 million via the local authorities concerned. A further £3 million was added in 1936, and £3.5 million was included in the estimates for 1937. "The powers of the commissioners included a wide range of activities on general economic development and on social improvement in the Special Areas, but they were expressly precluded by Parliament from giving assistance to private enterprise carried on for gain".

The subject of the Special Areas was a main election issue at the 1935 General Election.

== Subsequent developments ==
The Special Areas (Amendment) Act 1937 (1 Edw. 8 & 1 Geo. 6. c. 31) extended the act.

The whole act was repealed by section 8(1) of the Distribution of Industry Act 1945 (8 & 9 Geo. 6. c. 36), which came into force on 15 June 1945. The same subsection repealed the 1937 act, and section 8(2) provided for the winding up of the Special Areas Fund.
