= 2004 in British television =

This is a list of British television related events from 2004.

== Events ==
=== January ===
- 1 January – Emmerdale airs an hour long episode in which the village is hit by a storm, which includes Tricia Dingle, played by Sheree Murphy, being crushed by a falling chimney.
- 2 January – The BBC cancels the appearance of Coca-Cola sponsorship credits in the music charts in its BBC One Top of the Pops show, after criticism from politicians and health campaigners that it would be promoting junk food and unhealthy drink products to teenagers.
- 3 January – CD:UK broadcasts its first episode in 16:9 widescreen.
- 4 January –
  - ITV introduces a sixth weekly episode of Emmerdale airing on Sunday evenings at 7:00 pm. The episode is dropped in 2008 to allow for one-hour episodes on Tuesdays.
  - Debut of the Channel 4 reality series Shattered in which ten contestants are challenged with going without sleep for seven days while their actions are constantly monitored. Over the seven days the ten housemates must undergo daily performance testing and a variety of challenges, while competing for a potential prize fund of £100,000, which is reduced by £1,000 every time a contestant closes their eyes for more than ten seconds. The series, and the remaining prize money of £97,000, is won by Clare Southern on 10 January. It is subsequently branded as "misconceived and dangerous" by the British Association for Counselling and Psychotherapy, although Channel 4 says that sleep experts were consulted when putting together the series and that care was taken with the selection of participants.
- 5 January –
  - BBC One introduces the "Massai" ident that features nine native Maasai tribesmen dancing in the centre.
  - CITV introduces a first weekly episode of The Sleepover Club.
  - Beat the Nation makes its debut on Channel 4 as a new daytime quiz show replacing Fifteen to One which ended last December, hosted by The Goodies duo Tim Brooke-Taylor and Graeme Garden.
- 9 January – The BBC announces that the Kilroy talk show will be taken off air while the Corporation investigates negative comments its presenter Robert Kilroy-Silk made about Arabic people in the previous weekend's Sunday Express.
- 10 January – The first edition of ITV's new Saturday morning children's programme Ministry of Mayhem is broadcast on ITV (later CITV).
- 13 January – Acclaimed US medical drama Nip/Tuck makes its British television debut on Sky One, attracting an audience of 1 million. The series had been heavily publicised on terrestrial television prior to its broadcast.
- 15 January – BBC Four begins a six-part adaptation of the Alan Clark Diaries, starring John Hurt and Jenny Agutter. The series concludes on 17 February, and is later repeated on BBC Two.
- 16 January – Robert Kilroy-Silk resigns as a BBC One talk show host after 17 years following the controversy over comments he made about Arabs.
- 21 January – CITV airs the premiere of the Japanese-American TV series based on the Sonic the Hedgehog game series, Sonic X.
- 25 January – The fourth and final series of The Story Makers premieres on CBeebies.
- 28 January – The Hutton Inquiry into the circumstances of the death of Dr. David Kelly is published. This is taken by most of the press to strongly condemn the BBC's handling of the David Kelly affair and to exonerate the government. The Director-General of the BBC, Greg Dyke, chairman of the Board of Governors, Gavyn Davies, and the journalist at the centre of the controversy, Andrew Gilligan, resign. The UK media in general condemns the report as a whitewash.
- 29 January – Mark Byford becomes acting Director-General of the BBC following Greg Dyke's resignation.
- 30 January – ITV's News at Ten ends for a second time, with its replacement, the News at 10:30, launching the following Monday.
- January – SMG sells its stake in Scottish Radio Holdings to EMAP for £90 million in anticipation of consolidation in the radio market.

=== February ===
- 2 February –
  - ITV plc is formed from the merger of Carlton and Granada. The new company controls 90% of the ITV network.
  - The News at 10:30 debuts on ITV1. On the same day, ITV News is revamped with a new studio making extensive use of computer graphics that is nicknamed the 'Theatre of News', whilst regional news programmes adopt a new generic presentation package.
  - SMG's sells its stake in GMTV to ITV plc for £31 million.
- 4 February –
  - ITV announces the comedian Bradley Walsh is to join Coronation Street as the nephew of factory owner Mike Baldwin (Johnny Briggs). The news comes as it is announced that five actors will leave the soap over the next twelve months—Adam Rickitt (Nick Tilsley), Susie Blake (Bev Unwin), Iain Rogerson (Harry Flagg), Katherine Hunt (Angela Harris) and Thomas Craig (Tommy Harris). Beverley Callard (Liz McDonald) and Jane Danson (Leanne Battersby) are also set to return to the series in the summer.
  - UKTV announces plans to rebrand all their UK prefix channels as UKTV. UK Horizons will also be replaced by UKTV Documentary and UKTV People from 8 March.
  - Five confirms that The Terry and Gaby Show will be axed when it finishes its current run on 26 March.
- 5 February – Five actors from Coronation Street are axed by new producer Tony Wood. Adam Rickitt (Nick Tilsley), Susie Blake (Bev Unwin), Iain Rogerson (Harry Flagg), Katherine Hunt (Angela Harris) and Thomas Craig (Tommy Harris) will all leave when their contracts come to an end.
- 9 February – Kerry McFadden wins the third series of ITV1's I'm a Celebrity... Get Me Out of Here!.
- 13 February – Sky One airs the inaugural EuroMillions draw at 9pm, the first time a National Lottery draw has been aired on commercial television.
- 15 February –
  - Debut of ITV's How to Holiday, presented by Jenni Falconer and Dominic Littlewood. The programme has both presenters visiting the same location, with Falconer travelling in luxury while Littlewood travels on a budget.
  - Debut of Five's Back to Reality, a reality television programme featuring 12 contestants from other reality shows (such as Big Brother, The Salon and Pop Idol) spending three weeks in a purpose-built house, competing to become "Britain's most popular reality star". Deriving many of its ideas from other shows, the programme receives poor ratings and a solicitor's letter from Endemol because of its perceived similarity to Celebrity Big Brother.
- 16 February – BBC Network news titles are relaunched in the style of BBC News 24, which were introduced in December 2003.
- 27 February – Reports emerge of discussions between Channel 4 and Five aimed at a merger between the two channels.
- 29 February – Transmission date of the final edition of London Tonight to be produced by the London News Network. After this date its news operation is absorbed into ITN.

=== March ===
- 5 March – Major James Hewitt wins Five's Back to Reality.
- 7 March – An edition of ITV London's The Week is the final London News Network produced programme to be aired.
- 8 March –
  - All 'UK' prefix TV channels are rebranded to UKTV. For example, UK Bright Ideas is rebranded UKTV Bright Ideas, and UK History becomes UKTV History. As part of the changes, UK Horizons ceases broadcasting and is split into two new channels, UKTV Documentaries and UKTV People.
  - Brooke Kinsella, who plays Kelly Taylor in EastEnders, announces she will be leaving the soap after two and a half years, departing in the summer.
- 11 March – Five soap Family Affairs is to become the first British television series to allow viewers to decide a storyline, with them being asked to vote by phone on the outcome of a love triangle, and whether Yasmin (Ebony Thomas) or Geri (Anna Acton) will end up with Marc (Michael Wildman).
- 13 March – Charles Ngandwe, performing as Paul Robeson, wins the fifteenth series of Stars in Their Eyes. The edition is also the last to be presented by Matthew Kelly, who had announced the previous day that he would be leaving the series. The role of presenter is taken over by Cat Deeley.
- 14 March – Channel 4 airs the documentary He's Starsky, I'm Hutch, a programme which prompts actor David Soul to write an open letter to the channel complaining about the way he was portrayed in the film. Soul had co-operated with the documentary, but felt it betrayed because it had concentrated too much on the negative aspects of his life.
- 18 March – FremantleMedia confirms plans to bring the popular US TV series The Apprentice to the UK.
- 21 March – "An Apple a Day", an episode of Last of the Summer Wine aired on BBC One in which Billy Hardcastle does not appear.
- 22 March – Christopher Eccleston is announced as the ninth actor to play The Doctor in Doctor Who. A new 13-episode series is filmed in Cardiff later in the year and make its debut in 2005.
- 27 March – Following two years, The Story Makers airs the last ever episode.
- 29 March – BBC Two Controller Jane Root will leave her role to take up a position with the Discovery Network in the United States, it is reported.
- March –
  - Launch of the Islam Channel.
  - A new pay television service on digital terrestrial television, Top Up TV, launches. It offers ten channels, each of which broadcasts on a part-time basis.

=== April ===
- 1 April –
  - It is reported that ITV have axed On the Ball after losing the broadcast rights to screen Premiership highlights. It will disappear from the schedule at the end of the current season.
  - BBC One airs Pat and Mo, an EastEnders spin-off episode featuring Pat Butcher and Mo Harris during the 1950s.
- 2 April – Michael Grade is appointed as new BBC chairman, taking over the role from Gavyn Davies, who stepped down in the wake of the Hutton Report.
- 3 April – Debut of Come and Have a Go If You Think You're Smart Enough on BBC One, a live interactive quiz show hosted by Nicky Campbell.
- 7 April – Former Bad Girls actress Debra Stephenson is to join Coronation Street as new character Frankie Baldwin. She will be seen onscreen from June.
- 12 April – Magdalen College, Oxford wins the 2003–04 series of University Challenge, beating Gonville and Caius College, Cambridge 190–160.
- 13 April – BBC Two airs the television debut of Hawking, a drama about the life and work of theoretical physicist Professor Stephen Hawking, and which stars Benedict Cumberbatch in the title role.
- 15 April – ITV announces plans for Vote for Me, a Pop Idol-style contest to find a Parliamentary candidate. The series will be presented by Jonathan Maitland.
- 19 April –
  - Tots TV begins screenings on CBeebies and BBC Two, as part of a broadcast deal between the BBC and Carlton, who distributed the series.
  - 60 Minute Makeover debuts on ITV1.
- 20 April – BBC Two celebrates 40 years on air by broadcasting Happy Birthday BBC Two.
- 21 April – After commenting on a UEFA Champions League match on ITV1, football pundit and ex-manager Ron Atkinson makes a racist slur. Although transmission in the UK has finished, the comment is broadcast live to the Middle East and Atkinson resigns immediately.
- 23 April
  - ITV unveils plans for The X Factor, a new music talent contest developed by Pop Idol judge Simon Cowell that will see a panel of judges mentoring acts and competing against each other to have their act chosen as the winner.
  - The last episode of Catchphrase is broadcast on ITV1, after a run of 18 years. The show would be later revived in 2013.
- 24 April – Computer programmer and quiz expert Pat Gibson becomes the fourth contestant to win the £1 million prize on Who Wants to Be a Millionaire?.
- 26 April – Michael Parkinson is to take his Parkinson chat show to ITV after the network poached him from the BBC, it is reported. Parkinson's decision to make the move was also influenced by BBC plans to move his show to a different time slot to make way for the return of Match of the Day. His final BBC show is recorded on 29 April for transmission on 8 May.
- 27 April – The BBC's Programme Complaints Committee rules that an episode of EastEnders that dealt with the aftermath of the rape of a character was unsuitable for family viewing after it received several complaints from viewers. Complaints about the episode are also later upheld by Ofcom.
- April – The newly created ITV plc purchases NTL's 35% stake in the ITV News Channel.

=== May ===
- 2 May – Merseybeat actress Leslie Ash's publicist has released a statement saying that she is undergoing treatment in hospital for "an unknown infection", which she is believed to have contracted during an earlier hospital stay. Ash was treated for a broken rib and collapsed lung a few days earlier, which she said had occurred as a result of her falling onto a table during lovemaking with her husband, former footballer Lee Chapman. The infection has left Ash with partial loss of feeling below the waist, but she is said to be responding to treatment and is described as stable. The infection is subsequently diagnosed as Methicillin-Sensitive Staphylococcus aureus, a bug that attacks the nervous system. Following her recovery, Ash later speaks about how she almost died from the infection. She is also left requiring the aid of crutches to walk.
- 7 May – The BBC airs its final episode of The Simpsons, having lost the broadcasting rights to Channel 4 in February 2002. Behind the Laughter is the last episode shown on the BBC. However, broadcasting rights were held until 2006, two years later.
- 8 May – The final edition of Parkinson to air on BBC One. Guests include The Corrs, Boris Becker, Jamie Cullum and Patrick Kielty.
- 14 May – BBC Four Controller Roly Keating is appointed to succeed Jane Root as Controller of BBC Two.
- 15 May –
  - Strictly Come Dancing makes its debut on BBC One.
  - Ukraine's Ruslana wins the 2004 Eurovision Song Contest with "Wild Dances".
  - Paul Cowperthwaite, performing as Michael Jackson wins the third junior series of Stars in Their Eyes.
  - The Premiership ends on ITV1 after three seasons.
- 19 May –
  - A UK version of the popular US TV series The Apprentice is to be produced for the BBC, with Amstrad founder and chairman Sir Alan Sugar as presenter. Applications will be invited for 14 candidates to take part in the programme, which will air in 2005.
  - Martin Bashir is to leave ITV after signing a deal to work for the US ABC network, where he will be a correspondent on its 20/20 news programme.
- 21 May – Mark Thompson is appointed new Director-General of the BBC.
- 24 May – Former pop star Billie Piper is announced as the new Doctor Who companion Rose Tyler.
- 26 May – As part of a government trial to test the feasibility of switching the UK to digital television, Ferryside and Llansteffan, two towns in Carmarthenshire, have been chosen to become the first places in the UK to have their analogue signal switched off. Residents who do not currently have access to digital television will be provided with set-top boxes to enable them to receive a digital signal before the analogue transmitter is turned off later in the year. The government hopes to convert the UK to digital television by 2010.
- 27 May – Channel 4 airs Paul Greengrass's controversial film Omagh, a graphic portrayal of the events surrounding the Omagh bombing. The film, which took two years to research and make, had previously received a cinema showing that was attended by victims and their families, and later goes on general release.
- 28 May – Channel 4 airs the final episode of US sitcom Friends, with the episode watched by 8.6 million viewers.
- 31 May – Long-running children's animated television series Peppa Pig premieres on the Nick Jr. Channel and Five.

=== June ===
- 2 June – Friday the 13th: The Final Chapter makes its Network television premiere on ITV1.
- 4 June –
  - BBC News reports that having been axed by BBC America in September 2003, EastEnders will air in the US once again. Episodes will appear on the subscription channel Dish Network, beginning from where BBC America left the series.
  - Kitten Pinder is evicted from the Big Brother UK house, shouting against The Queen and the aristocracy on the way out. She is the first contestant to be evicted by the show's producers rather than through an audience vote after she repeatedly broke the rules during her stay in the house.
- 5 June – Launch of the BBC's Summer in the Sixties season with a night of classic TV from the 1960s on BBC Four, including episodes of Coronation Street, Z-Cars, Not Only But Also, and Call My Bluff. More 1960s programming is aired on 6 June, with episodes of World in Action and Till Death Us Do Part among the lineup.
- 7 June – Jane Danson returns to Coronation Street as Leanne Battersby after an absence of four years.
- 9 June –
  - BSkyB unveil plans to launch a free-to-air service to rival Freeview.
  - Jurassic Park III makes its Network television premiere on ITV1.
- 11 June – BBC Four begins a re-run of the 1960s classic television series The Prisoner.
- 12 June–4 July – Euro 2004 is held in Portugal.
- 14 June – Quiz TV launches in the UK, one of the country's first phone-in quiz channels. Many more launched over the next few years, though Quiz TV itself would close down in 2006.
- 17 June – The live feed of Big Brother is taken off air as the housemates become aggressive and fight. Security guards are sent in to break up the fight, while Hertfordshire Police ask to view footage of the incident after being contacted by members of the public.
- 22 June – Mark Thompson takes over as Director-General of the BBC.
- 23 June – Channel 4 airs the final episode of the US sitcom Frasier.
- 24 June – The highest rated audience of the year is recorded in the UK as 20.66 million watch England's football match against Portugal in the quarter finals of Euro 2004. Viewing figures for any programme would not reach the 20 million mark again for another eight years, when England faced Italy at Euro 2012.

=== July ===
- 1 July – Andy Duncan succeeds Mark Thompson as Chief Executive of Channel 4.
- 3 July – BBC newsreader Natasha Kaplinsky and her dance partner Brendan Cole are crowned series champions as the first series of Strictly Come Dancing reaches its grand final.
- 4 July – Des Lynam presents his final sports television broadcast after a career spanning 27 years across both BBC and ITV. Lynam departs ITV following coverage of the final of UEFA Euro 2004, and would return to radio broadcasting at the BBC the following month.
- 5 July – 50th anniversary of television news broadcasts.
- 8 July – The first Schools edition of Question Time is aired on BBC One. Recorded in London, the panel is made up of guests chosen by the winners of the Schools Question Time Challenge.
- 15 July – The BBC broadcasts a documentary on the British National Party in which undercover reporter Jason Gwynne infiltrated the BNP by posing as a football hooligan. The programme results in Mark Collett and Nick Griffin, the leader of the party, being charged for inciting racial hatred in April 2005, for comments made in the film.
- 17 July – Simply the Best debuts on ITV1, an eight week competition featuring teams from 14 different cities across the UK taking part in a series of physical and wacky challenges. The show also features performances from a variety of music acts.
- 18 July – BBC Four airs a night of programming celebrating the work of Jack Rosenthal, including an episode of Coronation Street written by him.
- 23 July – Repeats of Rosie and Jim end on CITV.
- 26 July – Space Precinct continues on ITV1.
- 27 July – Tiny Pop launched in the UK (2004–present).

=== August ===
- 6 August – Nadia Almada wins the fifth series of Big Brother.
- 8 August – EastEnders announce the introduction of a new family, the Millers, who will be seen on screen from September.
- 11 August – The Daily Mirror reports that a laptop stolen during a burglary at the home of a senior member of the EastEnders production team could lead to several months of major storylines being leaked as the computer contained scripts for upcoming episodes.
- 12 August – Five signs a deal with Sony Pictures Television to premiere a number of films before they appear on pay-per-view platforms. These include the British television debut of Terminator 3: Rise of the Machines.
- 13–29 August – The BBC airs live coverage of the 2004 Summer Olympics from Athens. For the first time, in addition to the usual through the day coverage across both BBC One and BBC Two, viewers are able to select from up to four alternative events to watch at any one time through either interactive television or the BBC Sport website.
- 14 August – Match of the Day returns to BBC One's Saturday night schedule after a three year absence as the network regains highlights to the FA Premiership.
- 15 August – Channel 4 airs the 2000 musical film Coyote Ugly.
- 19 August – Channel 4's subscription film channel FilmFour announces it will be available to non-subscribers for the first weekend in October. The free weekend will coincide with the beginning of the channel's month long Killer Thrillers season.
- 31 August –
  - CITV axes in-vision continuity between programmes for a second time. The change is made as part of its production relocation from Birmingham to Manchester.
  - Channel 4 airs Franklin for the very final time.

=== September ===
- September – The BBC airs the final episode of The Fresh Prince of Bel-Air, ending repeats.
- 4 September – Launch of the UK version of The X Factor, the first television programme produced by Simon Cowell's production company Syco. Cowell is joined on the judging panel by Louis Walsh and Sharon Osbourne.
- 5 September – ITV1 airs the 14th series of Heartbeat with the opening episode "Money, Money, Money" watched by 8.76 million viewers.
- 11 September – Harry Hill takes over hosting duties on You've Been Framed!, replacing Jonathan Wilkes. Hill serves as a narrator, providing humorous commentary over the clips with a pre-recorded audience soundtrack.
- 16 September – BBC One airs a special edition of Question Time to celebrate its 25th anniversary.
- 23 September – Bosses at Coronation Street confirm that Johnny Briggs (who plays Mike Baldwin) will leave the series in 2006, after agreeing an "exit strategy" with the actor.
- 27 September –
  - ABC1, a channel from Disney, is launched in the UK.
  - EastEnders wins Best Soap at the Inside Soap Awards for the eighth year in a row.
  - ITV confirms that its celebrity idents will be axed as part of a rebrand timed to coincide with the launch of ITV3.
- 28 September – ITV has signed a deal with Warner Bros to air film releases produced in 2003, 2004 and 2005. Titles include Harry Potter and the Chamber of Secrets, Harry Potter and the Prisoner of Azkaban, The Matrix Reloaded, The Matrix Revolutions and Troy.

=== October ===
- 1 October –
  - As part of its response to the Hutton Inquiry the BBC launches Newswatch, a programme providing a viewer and listener right-to-reply on BBC News's reporting and coverage of news events.
  - BBC Technology, incorporating the BBC's Broadcast Engineering division, is sold to Siemens Business Services for approximately £200m, and a £2bn, 10-year outsourcing contract.
  - ITV talk show host Trisha Goddard will move to Five in 2005 after signing a two-year contract with the broadcaster.
- 2 October –
  - BBC One airs One Night with Barry Manilow, a television special in which Barry Manilow performs some of his best known songs.
  - ITV1 begins airing the fourth series of Ant & Dec's Saturday Night Takeaway.
- 4 October –
  - UK television debut of the US version of The Apprentice with Donald Trump on BBC Two.
  - Peppa Pig begins its first broadcast on ABC in Australia.
- 13 October –
  - The BBC, ITV and Channel 4 announce that audio description, which helps people with sight loss to follow television programmes by describing some of the visual content, is now available through Sky.
  - It is announced that the entire Ferreira family will leave EastEnders in Spring 2005.
- 21 October – BSkyB launch their free digital satellite TV service that offers viewers a selection of 140 TV and 80 radio channels for a one-off payment of £150.
- 27 October – British television premiere of the James Bond film Die Another Day on ITV1.
- 28 October – BBC One airs a special edition of Question Time from Miami, Florida, ahead of the 2004 US presidential election.
- 30 October – The BBC receives "hundreds of complaints" after reporter Barbara Plett describes herself crying when a frail Yasser Arafat was evacuated to France for medical treatment. Ultimately these complaints are partially upheld by the BBC Governors' Programme Complaints Committee.
- 31 October – ITV's regional logos (Anglia, Border, Carlton, Granada, LWT, Meridian, Tyne Tees, and Yorkshire) are seen on screen for the final time, having continued to appear as endcaps after the formation of ITV plc. From the following day, all ITV produced programmes are credited as a Granada production until 2006, when it is formally rebranded as ITV Productions.

=== November ===
- 1 November – The digital television station ITV3 is launched at 9:00 pm, replacing Granada Plus, which ceases broadcasting earlier that day unexpectedly after ITV takes full control of Granada Sky Broadcasting in a deal that will allow for ITV3 to launch on Sky Digital. On the same day, ITV1 unveils a new look, replacing its celebrity-led idents that had been used for just over two years with new idents that feature the ITV1 logo, now made up of individual squares, animating into place on various abstract blue backgrounds.
- 5 November –
  - Just over a year after his high-profile return to EastEnders, the BBC confirms that Leslie Grantham, who plays Den Watts will leave for a second time.
  - The Simpsons debuts on Channel 4, having won the broadcasting rights from the BBC in February 2002, with the first terrestrial showings of the episodes A Tale of Two Springfields and Treehouse of Horror XI. The network plans to air classic re-runs of the show on weeknights at 6pm with first run episodes airing in a primetime slot on Friday nights.
- 6 November – BBC One celebrates the forthcoming 10th anniversary of the launch of the National Lottery with the special one-off programme The National Lottery 10th Birthday Celebration, featuring a mash-up of its four gameshow formats played by six celebrity contestants in aid of charity. A special jackpot-only draw with a guaranteed £10 million prize also takes place that evening.
- 10 November – British television premiere of the 2002 romantic comedy-drama film About a Boy starring Hugh Grant, Rachel Weisz and Nicholas Hoult. The film airs on ITV1 first, before being shown on BBC One on 14 November.
- 14 November – Five shows the UK terrestrial television premiere of Terminator 3: Rise of the Machines.
- 15 November – It emerges that Mersey Television boss Phil Redmond wrote to Secretary of State for Culture, Media and Sport offering to buy the publicly funded Channel 4. However, Ofcom says that the channel will not be privatised.
- 17 November –
  - It is reported that merger talks between Channel 4 and Five have been called off after complexities arose between the public broadcaster Channel 4 and its commercial counterpart.
  - ITV1 airs the British television premiere of The Mummy Returns.
- 18 November – The video for the new charity single Do They Know It's Christmas? by Band Aid 20 airs simultaneously on all five main UK television networks, as well as over twenty satellite and cable stations. This unprecedented broadcast attracts 13.5 million viewers between 5:50 and 6:00pm.
- 24 November – A report by Ofcom has recommended that elderly and visually impaired people should be given financial assistance to help them buy equipment capable of receiving digital television before the analogue signal is switched off. The report suggests the government may need to set aside £250m–£400m to cover the cost of this.
- 26 November – Five airs the 2000th episode of its soap Family Affairs.
- 29 November – The BBC announces that Top of the Pops will move from its Friday evening BBC One slot to BBC Two, where it will air on Sunday evenings.

=== December ===
- 1 December – BBC News reports that the digital switchover trial has begun after Ferryside and Llansteffan had their digital signal switched on a few days earlier. The towns were chosen because they received their signal from a single relay which had poor reception, and residents report that their viewing experience has improved since digital transmission began.
- 2 December – BBC Two unveils its winter season of programming, which will include a major documentary, Auschwitz, to coincide with Holocaust Memorial Day.
- 4 December – "Thunderbirds Are Go" by Busted is voted the 2004 Record of the Year by ITV viewers.
- 5 December – ITV1 aired the 4th series of the medical drama series The Royal, with the opening episode watched by 9.43 million viewers.
- 6 December – Joe Pasquale wins the fourth series of ITV1's I'm a Celebrity, Get Me Out of Here!.
- 7 December – Netwise, the company that handled text voting for ITV's Record of the Year show says that thousands of customers who were accidentally overcharged will receive refunds after it emerged that some Virgin and T-Mobile users were charged multiple times for a single vote. The company confirms the affected votes did not alter the final result.
- 11 December – Steve Brookstein wins the first series of The X Factor. On the same evening, actress Jill Halfpenny and dance partner Darren Bennett win the second series of Strictly Come Dancing.
- 12 December –
  - Double Olympic gold medalist Kelly Holmes is named as this year's BBC Sports Personality of the Year.
  - ITV1 airs Westlife: She's The One, a one-off X Factor-style programme following Irish boy band Westlife as they search for a fan to sing on their latest album Allow Us To Be Frank. Joanne Hindley from Bolton is chosen to accompany the band on their rendition of "The Way You Look Tonight".
  - Agatha Christie's Marple makes its debut on ITV1 with the first episode watched by 8.72 million viewers.
- 24 December –
  - Christmas Eve highlights on BBC One include the films: The Princess Diaries and Shrek.
  - Stan Richards makes his final appearance as Seth Armstrong in Emmerdale which he will be killed off a year later. Richards died on 11 February 2005 at the age of 74.
- 25 December
  - The first Harry Potter film, Harry Potter and the Philosopher's Stone makes its UK television debut on BBC One as part of the channel's Christmas Day lineup.
  - Channel 4's Alternative Christmas Message is delivered by Julie Kavner as Marge Simpson, following the recent acquisition of terrestrial rights to The Simpsons.
- 26 December
  - Overnight viewing figures suggest BBC One beat ITV in the Christmas Day battle of the ratings, with EastEnders watched by 12.3 million viewers and The Vicar of Dibley achieving an audience of 11.8 million. The television premiere of Harry Potter and the Philosopher's Stone was seen by 7.9 million. On ITV, Coronation Street attracted 11.3 million, while the first Midsomer Murders Christmas special received 6.3 million viewers.
  - The Boxing Day Tsunami results in extended news bulletins airing on both BBC One and ITV1, along with some minor changes to the schedules.
- 27 December – Debut of Pride, Simon Nye's tale about two lion cubs growing up on the African plains, and which is aired on BBC One. The film features the voices of numerous British actors and uses CGI technology to enhance footage of actual lions and other animals.
- 31 December –
  - New Year's Eve highlights on BBC One include the network television premiere of the psychological thriller Don't Say a Word.
  - After five and a half years, Channel 4 has another rebrand replacing the previous squares idents with objects that transform into the Channel 4 logo.

=== Unknown ===
- STV axes the lunchtime edition of Scotland Today.
- Peppa Pig begins its first television screening in New Zealand on TV3.

== Debuts ==
=== BBC One ===
- 1 January – Carrie's War (2004)
- 17 January – The Murder Room (2004)
- 2 February – Sea of Souls (2004–2007)
- 24 February – Hustle (2004–2012)
- 12 March – The Worst Week of My Life (2004–2006)
- 18 April – He Knew He Was Right (2004)
- 15 May – Strictly Come Dancing (2004–present)
- 6 July – 55 Degrees North (2004–2005)
- 9 July – Coming Home (2004–present)
- 3 September – Carrie & Barry (2004–2005)
- 6 September – Live at the Apollo (2004–present)
- 9 September – Should I Worry About...? (2004–2005)
- 28 September – A Thing Called Love (2004)
- 16 October – Julian Fellowes Investigates: A Most Mysterious Murder (2004)
- 17 October – Himalaya with Michael Palin (2004)
- 14 November – North & South (2004)
- 26 December – Sherlock Holmes and the Case of the Silk Stocking (2004)

=== BBC Two ===
- 15 February – Bella and the Boys (2004)
- 20 February – Sex & Lies (2004)
- 1 March – Look and Read: Shadow Play (2004)
- 14 March – Gunpowder, Treason & Plot (2004)
- 13 April – Hawking (2004)
- 20 April – Happy Birthday BBC Two (2004)
- 7 July – The Long Firm (2004)
- 15 August – Match of the Day 2 (2004–present)
- 29 September – Arrested Development (2003–2006, 2013; 2018–2019)
- 12 October – Who Do You Think You Are? (2004–present)

=== BBC Three ===
- 6 January – Nighty Night (2004–2005)
- 18 May – The Mighty Boosh (2004–2007)
- 24 May – Killing Time (2004)
- 23 June – Bodies (2004–2006)
- 29 June – The Smoking Room (2004–2005)

=== BBC Four ===
- 15 January – The Alan Clark Diaries (2004)

=== BBC News 24 ===
- 1 October – Newswatch (2004–present)

=== Bravo ===
- 3 September – Street Crime UK 3
- 6 September – Blues and Twos
- 6 September – Hot Lines

=== CBBC ===
- 8 March – Bamzooki (2004–2010)
- 21 September – Shoebox Zoo (2004–2007)

=== ITV (Including ITV1, ITV2 and ITV3) ===
- 5 January – The Sleepover Club (2003–2007)
- 7 January – Powers (2004)
- 8 January – Unsolved (2004–2006)
- 10 January – Ministry of Mayhem (2004–2006)
- 16 February –
  - Life Begins (2004–2006)
  - 24 Hour Quiz (2004)
- 13 March – Murder in Suburbia (2004–2005)
- 18 March – Murder City (2004–2006)
- 5 April – The Second Quest (2004)
- 19 April – 60 Minute Makeover (2004–present)
- 21 April – Shane (2004)
- 25 April – The Brief (2004–2005)
- 23 May – Hell's Kitchen (2004–2009)
- 7 June –
  - Making Waves (2004)
  - A Line in the Sand (2004)
- 11 July – Island at War (2004)
- 13 July – My Life as a Popat (2004, 2007)
- 26 July – Space Precinct (2004–2009)
- 14 August – Sex, Footballers and Videotape (2004)
- 1 September – Steel River Blues (2004)
- 2 September – Doc Martin (2004–2019)
- 4 September –
  - The X Factor (2004–2019)
  - Von Trapped (2004)
- 11 September – Beauty (2004)
- 18 September – King of Fridges (2004)
- 19 September – She's Gone (2004)
- 24 September – Orange Playlist (2004–2007)
- 26 September – Dirty Filthy Love (2004)
- 18 October – Tunnel of Love (2004)
- 24 October – Totally Spies! (2001–2008)
- 25 October – Whose Baby? (2004)
- 4 November – Blue Dove (2004)
- 15 November – Lie with Me (2004)
- 12 December – Agatha Christie's Marple (2004–2013)
- 20 December – Christmas Lights (2004)
- 27 December – The Final Quest (2004)

=== Channel 4 ===
- 5 January – Beat the Nation (2004)
- 13 January – Shameless (2004–2013)
- 25 January – Comfortably Numb (2004)
- 2 March – No Angels (2004–2006)
- 7 March – The O.C. (2003–2007)
- 7 July – Supernanny (2004–2008, 2010–2012 as Extreme Parental Guidance)
- 24 August – NY-LON (2004)
- 3 September – Green Wing (2004–2007)
- 14 October – Sex Traffic (2004)
- 23 November – The Sex Inspectors (2004–2007)

=== Five ===
- 31 May – Peppa Pig (2004–present)
- 7 June – The Gadget Show (2004–present)
- 11 September –
  - Beyblade G-Revolution (2004)
  - Duel Masters (2004–2005)
- 30 October – Murder Prevention (2004)

=== S4C ===
- 27 July – Clwb Winx (2004–2009)

=== Sky One ===
- 13 January – Nip/Tuck (2003–2010)
- 12 February – Cold Case (2003–2010)
- 13 April – Las Vegas (2003–2008)
- 17 October – Hex (2004–2006)
- 23 October – Power Rangers: Dino Thunder (2004)

=== Cartoon Network UK ===
- 5 January – Whatever Happened to Robot Jones? (2002–2004)
- 5 April – Xiaolin Showdown (2003–2006)
- 30 October – Foster's Home for Imaginary Friends (2004–2009)
- 1 November – Atomic Betty (2004–2008)

=== Nickelodeon UK ===
- 6 September – Drake & Josh (6 September 2004 – 16 September 2007)

=== Trouble ===
- 7 June – Undergrads (2001)
- 16 July – Run of the House (2003–2004)

=== Nicktoons UK ===
- 5 January – My Dad The Rock Star (2003–2004)
- 31 October – Danny Phantom (31 October 2004 – 24 August 2007)

=== Boomerang UK ===
- 2 February – Duck Dodgers (2004–2007)

=== Disney Channel UK ===
- 8 November – Brandy & Mr Whiskers (2004–06)

=== Fox Kids UK/Jetix UK ===
- 3 April – Sonic X (2002–04)
- 7 August – Martin Mystery (2003–2006)

=== Pop ===
- 3 February – Adventures of Sonic the Hedgehog (1993)
- 27 May – Adventures of Sonic the Hedgehog (1993) (Sonic week on Pop in the UK – 65 Episodes)
- 2 August – Sonic the Hedgehog (1993–1994)

== Channels ==
=== New channels ===
Date	Channel
8 March	UKTV People
8 March	UKTV People +1
27 September	ABC1
1 November	ITV3
1 November	UKTV G2 +1

=== Defunct channels ===
Date	Channel
16 April	TV Travel Shop
16 April	TV Travel Shop 2
1 November	Plus

=== Rebranded channels ===
Date	Old Name	New Name
8 March
8 March	UK Bright Ideas	UKTV Bright Ideas
8 March	UK Drama	UKTV Drama
8 March	UK Food	UKTV Food
8 March	UK Food +1	UKTV Food +1
8 March	UK Gold	UKTV Gold
8 March	UK Gold +1	UKTV Gold +1
8 March	UK G2	UKTV G2
8 March	UK History	UKTV History
8 March	UK History +1	UKTV History +1
8 March	UK Horizons	UKTV Documentary
8 March	UK Horizons +1	UKTV Documentary +1
8 March	UK Style	UKTV Style
8 March	UK Style +1	UKTV Style +1
27 July	Pop Plus	Tiny Pop

== Television shows ==
=== Changes of network affiliation ===
Show	Moved from	Moved to
The Boat Race	BBC One	ITV1
What Not to Wear	BBC Two	BBC One
The Kumars	BBC Two	BBC One
The Simpsons (UK Terrestrial Rights)	BBC Two	Channel 4
24	BBC Two	Sky One
100 Deeds for Eddie McDowd	Disney Channel	Nickelodeon
Franklin	Channel 4	Five
Winx Club	FoxBox (USA)	S4C (Winx Club Welsh Title: Clwb Winx)
Tots TV	Carlton Kids/CITV Block	CBeebies and BBC Two
Atomic Betty	Cartoon Network	CITV on ITV1
Fun Song Factory	GMTV	CITV on ITV1 and ITV2
King of the Hill (first run rights)	Sky One	FX
Adventures of Super Mario Bros. 3	Channel 4 The Children's Channel	Pop / Pop Plus; GMTV2
Adventures of Sonic the Hedgehog	Channel 4 The Children's Channel	Pop / Pop Plus; GMTV2
Sonic the Hedgehog	Channel 4 The Children's Channel	Pop / Pop Plus; GMTV2
Totally Spies!	Channel 4 The Children's Channel	Pop / Pop Plus; GMTV2
The Sleepover Club	CITV	Nickelodeon
Space Precinct	BBC Two	ITV1 and ITV2
Mummies Alive!	Sky One; GMTV	GMTV2
Blues and Twos	UK Horizons	Bravo
Tiny Pop	Pop	Tiny Pop

=== Returning this year after a break of one year or longer ===
- Postman Pat (1981, 1991–1994, 1996, 2004–2008).
- Pingu (1986–1998, 2004–2006)
- Tots TV (1993–1998, 2004–2008)
- Fun Song Factory (1998, 2004)

== Continuing television shows ==
=== 1920s ===
- BBC Wimbledon (1927–1939, 1946–2019, 2021–present)

=== 1930s ===
- Trooping the Colour (1937–1939, 1946–2019, 2023–present)
- The Boat Race (1938–1939, 1946–2019, 2021–present)

=== 1950s ===
- Andy Pandy (1950–1970, 2002–2005)
- Panorama (1953–present)
- What the Papers Say (1956–2008)
- The Sky at Night (1957–present)
- Blue Peter (1958–present)
- Grandstand (1958–2007)

=== 1960s ===
- Coronation Street (1960–present)
- Songs of Praise (1961–present)
- Top of the Pops (1964–2006)
- Match of the Day (1964–present)
- Call My Bluff (1965–2005)
- The Money Programme (1966–2010)

=== 1970s ===
- Emmerdale (1972–present)
- Newsround (1972–present)
- Superstars (1973–1985, 2003–2005)
- Last of the Summer Wine (1973–2010)
- Arena (1975–present)
- One Man and His Dog (1976–present)
- Top Gear (1977–2001, 2002–present)
- Grange Hill (1978–2008)
- Ski Sunday (1978–present)
- Antiques Roadshow (1979–present)
- Question Time (1979–present)

=== 1980s ===
- Children in Need (1980–present)
- Timewatch (1982–present)
- Countdown (1982–present)
- The Bill (1984–2010)
- Channel 4 Racing (1984–2016)
- Thomas & Friends (1984–present)
- EastEnders (1985–present)
- Comic Relief (1985–present)
- Casualty (1986–present)
- ChuckleVision (1987–2009)
- This Morning (1988–present)

=== 1990s ===
- Stars in Their Eyes (1990–2006, 2015)
- A Touch of Frost (1992–2010)
- Heartbeat (1992–2010)
- Breakfast with Frost (1993–2005)
- Room 101 (1994–2007, 2012–2018)
- Time Team (1994–2013)
- The National Lottery Draws (1994–2017)
- Top of the Pops 2 (1994–2017)
- Never Mind the Buzzcocks (1996–2015)
- Silent Witness (1996–present)
- Y Clwb Rygbi, Wales (1997–present)
- Dream Team (1997–2007)
- Family Affairs (1997–2005)
- Midsomer Murders (1997–present)
- Who Wants to Be a Millionaire? (1998–2014)
- Bob the Builder (1998–present)
- British Soap Awards (1999–2019, 2022–present)
- Holby City (1999–2022)
- My Parents Are Aliens (1999–2006)

=== 2000s ===
- Doctors (2000–present)
- Big Brother (2000–2018)
- The Weakest Link (2000–2012, 2017–present)
- The Kumars (2001–2006, 2014)
- Popworld (2001–2007)
- Real Crime (2001–2011)
- UK Top 40 (2002–2005)
- Harry Hill's TV Burp (2002–2012)
- Flog It! (2002–2020)
- Foyle's War (2002–2015)
- I'm a Celebrity...Get Me Out of Here! (2002–present)
- Spooks (2002–2011)
- Angelina Ballerina (2002–2005)
- River City (2002–2026)
- Tiny Pop (2003–2008)
- Daily Politics (2003–2018)
- Peep Show (2003–2015)
- New Tricks (2003–2015)
- Politics Show (2003–2011)
- QI (2003–present)
- The Royal (2003–2011)
- This Week (2003–2019)

== Ending this year ==
- ITV News at Ten (1967–2001, 2001–2004, 2008–present)
- Auf Wiedersehen, Pet (1983–1986, 2002–2004)
- Frasier (1993–2004)
- Animal Hospital (1994–2004)
- Changing Rooms (1996–2004)
- Robot Wars (1997–2004, 2016–2018)
- Winning Lines (1999–2004)
- Liquid News (2000–2004)
- 2DTV (2001–2004)
- As If (2001–2004)
- The Premiership (2001–2004)
- 15 Storeys High (2002–2004)
- Bo' Selecta! (2002–2004)
- The Vault (2002–2004)
- Mr. Bean: The Animated Series (2002–2004, 2015–present)
- Born to Be Different (2003–2004, 2006–2007, 2009, 2011–2013, 2016)
- Hardware (2003–2004)
- The Salon (2003–2004)
- The Smash Hits Chart Show (2003–2004)
- He Knew He Was Right (2004)
- The Long Firm (2004)
- Himalaya with Michael Palin (2004)
- North & South (2004)

== Deaths ==
Date	Name	Age	Cinematic Credibility
4 January	Brian Gibson	59	television director (Horizon, Blue Remembered Hills)
9 January	Lyndon Brook	77	actor (I, Claudius, The Avengers, The New Avengers, Crown Court)
27 January	Rikki Fulton	79	Scottish actor and comedian, surviving half of Francie and Josie
29 January	James Saunders	79	television scriptwriter (Bloomers)
26 February	Russell Hunter	79	actor (Callan, The Gaffer)
6 March	Max Harris	85	television theme composer (Porridge, Open All Hours, The Singing Detective)
7 March	Michael Stringer	79	television production designer (The Hound of the Baskervilles, Paradise Postponed)
8 March	Robin Hunter	74	actor (Up Pompeii, Poirot)
11 March	Adrian Ropes	62	Egyptian-born British actor (Emergency – Ward 10, The Avengers, Randall and Hopkirk)
18 March	Richard Marner	82	Russian-born British actor (Colonel Von Strohm in 'Allo 'Allo!)
28 March	Sir Peter Ustinov	82	British actor (Thirteen at Dinner, Dead Man's Folly)
29 March	Hubert Gregg	89	BBC broadcaster
30 March	Alistair Cooke	95	BBC broadcaster and transatlantic commentator
13 April	Caron Keating	41	television presenter (Blue Peter)
17 April	Bruce Boa	73	actor (Fawlty Towers)
19 April	Philip Locke	76	actor (Doctor Who)
3 May	Anthony Ainley	71	actor (Doctor Who)
14 May	Shaun Sutton	85	writer, director, producer and longest-serving Head of Drama at BBC Television.
16 May	Harry Elton	74	television producer (Coronation Street)
29 May	Jack Rosenthal	72	television scriptwriter (Coronation Street, That Was the Week That Was)
3 June	Harold Goodwin	86	actor (Minder, All Creatures Great and Small, That's My Boy)
6 June	Judy Campbell	88	actress
18 June	Frederick Jaeger	76	German-born British actor (Doctor Who)
19 June	Colin McCormack	62	actor (Dixon of Dock Green, EastEnders)
23 June	Peter Birrel	68	actor (Frontier in Space, Alexander the Greatest)
1 July	Peter Barnes	73	television scriptwriter
3 July	John Barron	83	actor (The Fall and Rise of Reginald Perrin)
17 July	Pat Roach	67	actor (Auf Wiedersehen, Pet, The Last Place on Earth)
28 July	Alexei de Keyser	36	television producer
30 July	Ali Abbasi	42	Pakistani-born British television presenter
7 August	Bernard Levin	75	journalist and broadcaster (That Was the Week That Was)
13 August	Peter Woodthorpe	72	actor (Only Fools and Horses, Inspector Morse)
18 August	Hugh Manning	83	actor (Emmerdale, Mrs Thursday)
1 September	Richard Everitt	71	television producer (Coronation Street)
7 September	Fritha Goodey	31	actress
10 September	Glyn Owen	76	actor (Emergency – Ward 10, Howards' Way)
29 September	Christopher Hancock	76	actor (EastEnders)
6 October	Pete McCarthy	51	television presenter
13 October	Ivor Wood	72	Children's TV director (The Magic Roundabout, The Herbs, The Wombles, Paddington Bear, Postman Pat etc.)
14 October	Sheila Keith	84	actress (Crossroads, The Pallisers)
28 October	Graham Roberts	75	actor (Z-Cars)
6 November	Fred Dibnah	66	presenter and steeplejack
9 November	Emlyn Hughes	57	Former footballer and A Question of Sport captain
28 November	Molly Weir	94	actress (Rentaghost)
11 December	Christopher Blake	55	actor (Mixed Blessings, That's My Boy)
19 December	Richard Best	88	television director (The Avengers)
21 December	Michael Forrest	72	actor
26 December	Garard Green	80	actor and commentator (Forty Glorious Years)

== See also ==
- 2004 in British music
- 2004 in British radio
- 2004 in the United Kingdom
- List of British films of 2004
