= The Thursday Murder Club =

2020 crime novel by Richard Osman

- First edition
- Author: Richard Osman
- Language: English
- Series: Thursday Murder Club
- Genre: Crime
- Publisher: Viking Press
- Publication date: 3 September 2020
- Publication place: United Kingdom
- Pages: 400
- ISBN: 978-0241425442
- Followed by: The Man Who Died Twice

The Thursday Murder Club is a 2020 murder mystery novel, the debut novel by British television presenter Richard Osman. It is the first installment in his Thursday Murder Club series. It was published on 3 September 2020 by Viking Press, a subsidiary of Penguin Random House, and also released in 2020 as an audiobook, read by Lesley Manville.

== Plot ==
A group of pensioners (Elizabeth Best, Ron Ritchie, Joyce Meadowcroft and Ibrahim Arif) set about solving the mystery of the murder of a property developer in the luxurious Cooper's Chase retirement village near the fictitious seaside village of Fairhaven in Kent.

== Background and publication ==
Osman's inspiration for the book came from a visit he made to an upmarket retirement village. The premise and title bear clear similarities to Agatha Christie’s The Tuesday Club Murders, which also features a protagonist called Joyce.

Osman wrote the book over 18 months in secret. At 400 pages, the text is structured as 115 short chapters.

After a 10-way publishing auction, Penguin Random House acquired the rights to The Thursday Murder Club and its sequel The Man Who Died Twice for a seven-figure sum in 2019. The book was published on 3 September 2020. It sold 45,000 copies in its first three days on sale and became a Sunday Times number one bestseller. As of 8 September, it had been sold in 16 countries. In the week leading up to 19 December, it sold 134,514 copies, making it the first debut novel ever to be Christmas number one in the UK.

== Reception and sequels ==
In The Times, Christina Hardyment said the book has an "ingenious plot". The Guardian described it as the "fastest selling adult crime debut" in recorded history. The audiobook, one of 10 nominees, received the Sounds of Crime Award at Crimefest in 2021.

The sequels, The Man Who Died Twice, The Bullet That Missed, and The Last Devil to Die, were published in the Septembers of 2021, 2022, and 2023 respectively. A fifth book in the series, The Impossible Fortune, was released in 2025.

== Adaptations ==
An abridged version of the book was read by Haydn Gwynne and broadcast on BBC Radio 4 in early 2021. The reading took two hours and twenty minutes.

A film adaptation of the same name was released on Netflix 2025. It was directed by Chris Columbus, from a screenplay by Katy Brand and Suzanne Heathcote, and it stars Helen Mirren as Elizabeth, Pierce Brosnan as Ron, Ben Kingsley as Ibrahim, and Celia Imrie as Joyce.
