= In the Blink of an Eye (soundtrack) =

In the Blink of an Eye (Original Soundtrack)

Film score by Thomas Newman
- Released: February 27, 2026
- Recorded: 2025–2026
- Genre: Film score
- Length: 67:19
- Label: Hollywood
- Producer: Thomas Newman; Bill Bernstein

Thomas Newman chronology
The Thursday Murder Club (2025)	In the Blink of an Eye (2026)

In the Blink of an Eye (Original Soundtrack) is the film score to the 2026 science fiction drama film In the Blink of an Eye directed by Andrew Stanton starring Kate McKinnon, Rashida Jones and Daveed Diggs. The film score is composed and conducted by Thomas Newman and released through Hollywood Records on February 27, 2026.

== Background ==
On March 29, 2024, it was announced that Thomas Newman would compose the film score after previously working with Stanton on his Pixar films Finding Nemo (2003), WALL-E (2008) and Finding Dory (2016). The soundtrack album was released through Hollywood Records on February 27, 2026.

== Release ==
Filmtracks considered the hour-long album an "mostly ambient experience with a very strong final third" and listeners would find fifteen to twenty minutes of the album for "Newman's pleasantly ethereal dramas". James Southall of Movie Wave considered the score to be of two halves; first being an "often ethereal, sometimes challenging, decent enough" score and the second shifts from the "synthetic elements to a more orchestral focus" with the final 25 minutes being "really very strong". Brian Tallerico of RogerEbert.com said that Newman's score did most of the heavy lifting owing to the lack of dialogues. Siddhant Adlakha of Variety said that "Thomas Newman's otherwise mechanical score takes on fluid, untamed qualities."

Bilge Ebiri of Vulture noted that Newman's score helped the film. Sean Lunn of SLUG called it a "grand" and "elegant" score. Drew Taylor of TheWrap called it a "twinkling" score. Mark Keizer of MovieWeb wrote "Not even Thomas Newman's quietly insistent score can wrest a tear from our eyes". Emedo Ashibeze of Screen Rant wrote "Thomas Newman's score fills in the blanks of silence between dialogues and cavemen's unintelligent mutterings." Nick Schager of The Daily Beast wrote "Thomas Newman's warm bath of a score coats everything in oh-so-gentle sentimentality". Chris Bumbray of JoBlo.com called it a "good" score from Newman. A. A. Dowd of Empire wrote "Even the tinkle of a Thomas Newman score can't provide a Pixarian sense of wonder."

== Track listing ==
No.	Title	Length
1.	"Double Helix"	5:03
2.	"Sickness"	2:05
3.	"Handprint"	3:01
4.	"A Burial"	1:34
5.	"Zero to Very Little"	1:04
6.	"Left Palm"	2:42
7.	"Fate of Humanity"	2:46
8.	"Oxygen"	6:24
9.	"Time Passes"	3:01
10.	"Mothers Die"	3:54
11.	"Longevity Enhanced Pilot"	2:31
12.	"Bad News"	1:30
13.	"Blood Work"	2:39
14.	"Artificial Womb"	1:43
15.	"Since When"	2:48
16.	"Good Fortune"	6:21
17.	"An Ancient Wedding"	2:36
18.	"Golden Acorn"	7:25
19.	"Joy x Remembrance"	2:56
20.	"Atmospheric"	5:16
Total length:		67:19
