= We Solve Murders =

2024 novel by Richard Osman

- Author: Richard Osman
- Audio read by: Nicola Walker
- Genre: Mystery, Crime fiction
- Publisher: Viking Press
- Publication date: 2024
- Media type: Print, e-book, audiobook
- ISBN: 978-0-593-65322-7

We Solve Murders is a mystery novel by British writer Richard Osman, known for the Thursday Murder Club series. The first installment in a new series, the book was published by Viking Press in September 2024, alongside an audiobook edition read by Nicola Walker. The novel was released between the fourth and fifth Thursday Murder Club books.

== Plot ==
After three clients from her security firm are murdered, private security officer Amy Wheeler goes on the run with her current client, celebrity novelist Rosie D’Antonio, and her father-in-law, retired police officer (and pub quiz devotee) Steve Wheeler. Together, they embark on a global search to uncover who is behind the killings.

== Reception ==
The novel debuted at No. 1 on the UK Official Top 50, compiled by Nielsen BookScan, "with one of the best hardback fiction first-week performances since records began" and No. 2 on The New York Times Best Seller list for hardcover fiction.

== Adaptation ==
In September 2026, Osman revealed that a television series based on the book is in development by Netflix.

== Sequel ==
A sequel called We Chase Shadows was published in September, 2026. It is another murder mystery novel with the same main characters, Amy, Rosie, and Steve in their first proper case.
