= We Chase Shadows =

2026 novel by Richard Osman

- Author: Richard Osman
- Audio read by: Nicola Walker
- Language: English
- Series: We Solve Murders
- Genre: Mystery, crime fiction
- Publisher: Viking (UK), Pamela Dorman Books (US)
- Publication date: 10 September 2026 (UK); 15 September 2026 (US)
- Media type: Print, e-book, audiobook
- ISBN: 9798217060399
- Preceded by: We Solve Murders

We Chase Shadows is a mystery novel by British writer Richard Osman, published in September 2026 by Viking in the United Kingdom and Pamela Dorman Books in the United States. It is the sequel to We Solve Murders (2024) and the second novel in the series of the same name. The audiobook edition is read by Nicola Walker. Osman is also the author of the Thursday Murder Club series.

== Plot ==
We Chase Shadows continues the story of retired police officer Steve Wheeler, bodyguard Amy Wheeler, and bestselling author Rosie D'Antonio, the characters introduced in the first book. With Rosie's financial backing, they have expanded Steve's small private investigation company into a detective agency called We Solve Murders.

While promoting her latest book on The Graham Norton Show, Rosie also promotes the agency. Vern Blackwood sees her appearance and hires the trio after one of his bodyguards is killed outside his villa in Tuscany. Steve, Amy, and Rosie take Rosie's private jet to meet with Vern. He shares a threatening note, signed by Jakob Eriksson, described as the head of the counterfeit prescription-drug trade in Europe, that appears to take responsibility for the murder. But Vern is convinced Eriksson didn't write the note, citing an agreement made in Las Vegas five years earlier involving the two of them and four other sellers of fake medicine from different parts of the globe. Vern wants Steve, Amy, and Rosie to find out who wrote the note. Instead, they decide to look for Eriksson as part of an investigation that takes them around the world.

== Reception ==
Reviewers generally praised the sequel's humor and characters. While Daily Telegraph reviewer Jake Kerridge and Sunday Times reviewer John Dugdale both used the term "second-string" in comparing the series with the Thursday Murder Club books, both reviews spoke favorably of the novel. Kerridge noted that Osman explores the central characters' vulnerabilities more deeply than in the first book and Dugdale likened it to Carl Hiaasen's black-comedy thrillers, with a distinctly English slant.

In the United Kingdom, the book debuted at No. 1 on The Bookseller's Original Fiction Top 20, compiled from Nielsen BookScan data. In the United States, it debuted at No. 8 on The New York Times Best Seller list for hardcover fiction and No. 7 on the combined print and e-book fiction list.
