= Two Tribes (game show) =

- Genre: Game show
- Created by: Glenn Hugill
- Presented by: Richard Osman
- Country of origin: United Kingdom
- Original language: English
- No. of series: 2
- No. of episodes: 90

Production
- Running time: 30 minutes
- Production company: Remarkable Television

Original release
- Network: BBC Two
- Release: 18 August 2014 – 31 August 2015

Two Tribes is a BBC game show that aired on BBC Two from 18 August 2014 to 31 August 2015, hosted by Richard Osman.

== Format ==
Seven new contestants participate in each episode. Beforehand, they answer questions with a series of personal yes/no statements about themselves (e.g. "I'm a grandparent" or "I like heavy metal music"). The game consists of five rounds; before each of the first four, a different question is used to split the contestants into two teams, or "tribes," based on their responses. Scores are set to zero at the beginning of each round.

For rounds 1 and 3, the initial yes/no question is chosen so that one of the two tribes has one more member than the other, while those in rounds 2 and 4 result in two equal tribes.

=== Rounds 1 through 3 ===
Each tribe has 60 seconds to answer as many questions as possible, scoring one point per correct answer. Each member receives one question in turn and must answer individually. A wrong answer passes the question to the next member in line; if all members miss the same question, they forfeit the rest of their time.

All members of the higher-scoring tribe advance to the next round. The host asks a series of questions on the buzzer to the lower-scoring tribe; a correct answer allows a member to advance, while a miss eliminates them. The questions end when either one member has missed a question or all members but one have advanced, with the last member being eliminated in the latter case.

If the round ends in a tie, each tribe nominates one member for a one-question tiebreaker, played under the elimination rules above.

=== Round 4 ===
The tribes are asked a series of questions on the buzzer. Each correct answer scores one point, while a miss throws the question to the opposing tribe. The first tribe to score five points advances to the final.

=== Final ===
The two contestants have separate clocks. One contestant plays at a time, answering a series of questions as their own clock counts down. Once they give a correct answer, their clock stops and the opponent begins to play. As soon as one contestant's clock reaches zero, their opponent wins.

An initial toss-up on the buzzer is used to decide who plays first. A correct answer forces the opponent to start, while a miss requires the responding contestant to do so instead.

==== Series 1 ====
The clocks were set to 60 seconds, and the winner received £1,000 worth of vouchers for their choice of two different merchandise types (e.g. gardening equipment or books).

==== Series 2 ====
The clocks were set to 45 seconds. The winner of the final chose one of two categories and was given a list of four names, which they had to split into "Yes" and "No" tribes based on the category (e.g. "I've managed the England national football team"). The contestant was not told how many names belonged in each tribe.

Correctly sorting out all four names awarded a jackpot, which began at £1,000 after it was won and increased by that amount every day it went unclaimed. The largest jackpot win under this format was £7,000, achieved on 28 August 2015.

== Transmissions ==
Series	Start date	End date	Episodes
1	18 August 2014	26 September 2014	30
2	16 February 2015	31 August 2015	60

== Merchandise ==
The official Two Tribes Quiz app was launched in August 2015. The free app, available for iOS, Android and Amazon App Stores, mirrors the format of the TV show by splitting contestants into tribes depending on what they have in common before testing their general knowledge. Players can win a virtual jackpot in the Prize Round, which they can use to customise their very own contestant.
