= The Thursday Murder Club (film) =

2025 American crime comedy film by Chris Columbus

- Release poster
- Directed by: Chris Columbus
- Screenplay by: Katy Brand; Suzanne Heathcote
- Based on: The Thursday Murder Club by Richard Osman
- Produced by: Jennifer Todd; Chris Columbus
- Starring: Helen Mirren; Pierce Brosnan; Ben Kingsley; Celia Imrie
- Cinematography: Don Burgess
- Edited by: Dan Zimmerman
- Music by: Thomas Newman
- Production companies: Amblin Entertainment; Jennifer Todd Pictures; Maiden Voyage
- Distributed by: Netflix
- Release dates: August 21, 2025 (Leicester Square); August 28, 2025 (Netflix)
- Running time: 118 minutes
- Country: United States
- Language: English

The Thursday Murder Club is a 2025 American crime comedy film directed by Chris Columbus from a screenplay by Katy Brand and Suzanne Heathcote, based on the 2020 novel by Richard Osman. The film stars Helen Mirren, Pierce Brosnan, Ben Kingsley, and Celia Imrie with David Tennant, Jonathan Pryce, Naomi Ackie, Daniel Mays, Henry Lloyd-Hughes, Richard E. Grant, Tom Ellis, Geoff Bell, Paul Freeman, and Ingrid Oliver in supporting roles. Its plot follows a group of elderly amateur sleuths who attempt to solve a murder.

The Thursday Murder Club premiered in Leicester Square in London on August 21, 2025. The film was released in select theaters in the United Kingdom on August 22, ahead of its streaming debut on Netflix on August 28. It received generally positive reviews from critics. Its soundtrack was released by Netflix Music.

== Plot ==
At the Coopers Chase retirement village, psychiatrist Ibrahim Arif, former trade union leader Ron Ritchie, and mysterious Elizabeth Best are members of the Thursday Murder Club (TMC), which meets weekly to discuss cold cases. They are soon joined by Joyce, a retired nurse and new resident, whose medical knowledge proves useful.

The group currently is investigating a case once handled by Detective Inspector Penny Gray in 1973, who was a member of the club and now comatose in Cooper Chase's hospice, involving the unsolved murder of Angela Hughes. Police Constable Donna De Freitas, recently transferred from London, visits the village and strikes up a friendship with the TMC. She confides that her work feels tedious, so the club eagerly draws her into their investigations.

Meanwhile, conflict brews over plans to redevelop Coopers Chase into luxury flats. One of the owners, Ian Ventham, pushes the project forward, while his partner Tony Curran opposes it, promising the residents that he will block the sale. Shortly afterwards, Tony is murdered in his own home, his house ransacked and the weapon missing.

The TMC resolve to investigate. With Donna's help, they learn that local crime boss Bobby Tanner is secretly involved in the business but has long been thought to be dead after disappearing a few years earlier and that Ron's son Jason once worked with Tony. Suspicion briefly falls on Ian, but he is soon ruled out. During a residents' protest, Ian himself collapses and dies from a fentanyl overdose, leaving Tanner the apparent sole owner. Jason is arrested, though the evidence against him proves weak.

Elizabeth develops a cautious friendship with Bogdan, a Polish handyman employed at the village. He discovers a grave containing a skeleton on top of the coffin, later identified as Peter Mercer, the man who was Angela's boyfriend decades earlier. Elizabeth also begins receiving threats, warning her to leave the matter alone.

When Jason provides an alibi (an affair with Ian's estranged wife Gemma), the TMC turn their attention back to Tanner. Elizabeth and Donna discover that he has been trafficking migrants and seizing their passports, and, to their shock, Tony was his partner. Elizabeth confronts him and strikes a bargain: he is to keep Coopers Chase intact in return for her silence. She then realises that Bogdan was responsible for Tony's death.

At the same time, Bogdan, while playing chess with Elizabeth's husband Stephen, confesses, after being pressed, that he killed Tony under pressure but unintentionally. His confession is secretly, and accidentally, recorded by Stephen, and he is arrested. He reveals he merely wanted his passport back so he could return to Poland to his sick mother.

The truth about Angela's murder also emerges. The TMC deduce that Mercer killed her but that Penny secretly took justice into her own hands by killing Mercer and concealing his body. As Ian's plans to redevelop Coopers Chase might have revealed Mercer's body, thereby implicating Penny, her husband John murdered him to protect her. Both Penny and John die soon after in hospice care (implied to be a murder–suicide from fentanyl overdosing).

At their funeral, Elizabeth presents Penny's club necklace to Joyce, formally welcoming her as a full member of the TMC. With Coopers Chase up for sale, Joyce's daughter Joanna considers buying it. Life in the village quietly resumes, with friendships renewed and the club ready for whatever mystery may come next.

== Cast ==
- Helen Mirren as Elizabeth Best, a retired MI6 officer
- Pierce Brosnan as Ron Ritchie, a retired twice-divorced union leader
- Ben Kingsley as Professor Ibrahim Arif, a retired psychiatrist
- Celia Imrie as Joyce Meadowcroft, a retired trauma nurse
- Naomi Ackie as Donna De Freitas, a local police constable
- Daniel Mays as DCI Chris Hudson, the senior investigating officer and De Freitas's superior
- Henry Lloyd-Hughes as Bogdan, a Polish handyman employed at Cooper’s Chase
- Tom Ellis as Jason Ritchie, Ron's famous ex-boxer son
- David Tennant as Ian Ventham, an ambitious businessman and co-owner of Cooper’s Chase
- Jonathan Pryce as Stephen Best, Elizabeth's chess-playing husband
- Paul Freeman as John Gray, a retired vet and husband of dying Thursday Murder Club member Penny
- Geoff Bell as Tony Curran, Ian's business partner
- Ingrid Oliver as Joanna Meadowcroft, Joyce's hedge fund manager daughter
- Joseph Marcell as Father Mackie, a Catholic priest
- Ruth Sheen as Maud, Tony's aunt
- Richard E. Grant as Bobby Tanner, a criminal and, under the alias "Derek Ward", a florist
- Susan Kirkby as Penny Gray, former detective who is now dying
- Will Stevens as Peter Mercer, Angela's boyfriend

== Production ==
=== Development ===
In March 2020, it was announced that Ol Parker would write and direct a film adaptation of Richard Osman's debut novel The Thursday Murder Club for Amblin Entertainment, after Amblin acquired the worldwide rights to the project, with Jennifer Todd serving as producer and Osman serving as executive producer. In March 2023, Osman said filming was set to begin in September 2023 with Steven Spielberg as producer. In November 2023, it was reported that filming was scheduled to begin in March 2024. However, in February 2024, Osman said he was hopeful filming would commence in August 2024 after delays during the 2023 Hollywood labor disputes. In April 2024, Chris Columbus was announced to replace Parker as writer, co-producer and director. A few days later, it was announced that the project had been acquired by Netflix. Katy Brand announced on Instagram that she had written the final screenplay for the film on June 18, 2024.

=== Casting ===
In May 2024, Celia Imrie joined the cast as Joyce, with Helen Mirren, Pierce Brosnan and Ben Kingsley also part of the main cast. In June 2024, David Tennant, Jonathan Pryce, Naomi Ackie, Daniel Mays and Henry Lloyd-Hughes joined the cast. In July 2024, Richard E. Grant, Ingrid Oliver and Tom Ellis were among those added to the cast.

=== Filming ===
Principal photography began on June 27, 2024, at Shepperton Studios. Filming also took place in Beaconsfield in July 2024. Englefield House in Englefield, Berkshire, served as the exterior of Coopers Chase. In September 2024, Osman appeared on The Chris Moyles Show and revealed that filming would wrap the same day.

== Release ==
The Thursday Murder Club premiered in Leicester Square in London on August 21, 2025. The film was released in approximately 50 theaters in the United Kingdom for two weeks on August 22, ahead of its streaming debut on Netflix on August 28.

== Reception ==
=== Critical response ===
On the review aggregator website Rotten Tomatoes, 77% of 138 critics' reviews are positive, with an average rating of 6.2/10. The website's consensus reads: "Cozy as an undemanding beach reach and just as slight, this starry murder mystery leverages its terrific troupe of actors to nostalgic effect." Metacritic, which uses a weighted average, assigned the film a score of 60 out of 100, based on 25 critics, indicating "mixed or average" reviews.

Kat Halstead of Common Sense Media awarded the film four stars out of five, and wrote, "It lags slightly in places, and at two hours is a little overlong, but this is a successful jump from page to screen that leaves a promising door open for future adaptations from the series." Sheila O'Malley of RogerEbert.com wrote, "The Thursday Murder Club is engaging and often amusing. The plot contains enough surprises that the 'whodunit' generates real suspense. The characters aren't particularly well-developed, but neither are they stereotypes. The film feels more like a television pilot than a stand-alone film, which may be exactly what Netflix is looking for."

In a negative review, Laura Venning of Empire gave the film two stars out of five, while stating, "Maybe this would hit the spot for a Sunday-night sofa slump but it's more patronising than perceptive when it comes to portraying ageing. As disappointing as a stale scone."

=== Accolades ===
Award	Date of ceremony	Category	Recipient	Result	Ref.
National Film Awards UK	July 1, 2026	Best Feature Film	The Thursday Murder Club	Nominated	
National Film Awards UK	July 1, 2026	Best Thriller	The Thursday Murder Club	Nominated	
National Film Awards UK	July 1, 2026	Best Actor	Pierce Brosnan	Nominated	
National Film Awards UK	July 1, 2026	Best Actress	Helen Mirren	Nominated	
National Film Awards UK	July 1, 2026	Best Supporting Actress	Naomi Ackie	Nominated	
National Film Awards UK	July 1, 2026	Best Supporting Actor	Ben Kingsley	Nominated	
National Film Awards UK	July 1, 2026	Best Director	Chris Columbus	Nominated	
National Film Awards UK	July 1, 2026	Best Comedy	The Thursday Murder Club	Nominated	
