= The Fake News Show =

- Genre: Comedy panel game
- Directed by: Geraldine Dowd
- Presented by: Stephen Mangan
- Starring: Katherine Ryan; Richard Osman
- Country of origin: United Kingdom
- Original language: English
- No. of series: 1
- No. of episodes: 5

Production
- Executive producer: Richard Wilson
- Producers: Mark Barrett; Ed Ryland
- Running time: 30 minutes (inc. adverts)
- Production company: Hat Trick Productions

Original release
- Network: Channel 4
- Release: 6 February – 4 June 2017

The Fake News Show is a 5-episode British television comedy panel game show that has aired on Channel 4 as a pilot since 6 February 2017 and as a full series from 15 May 2017. It is hosted by Stephen Mangan with Katherine Ryan and Richard Osman as the panellists. The series is produced by Hat Trick Productions for Channel 4. The goal is for the two sort out various news stories and work out if they are true or not.

== Format ==
The show's title is a reference to the concept of 'fake news', a term popularised by President Donald Trump during the 2016 U.S. presidential election. Throughout the episode, the teams are presented with various popular or sensational news stories taken directly from well known media publishers, and they must then decipher if the information was factual or not. In the pilot episode, thousands of points were awarded for each correct answer and were referred to as 'clicks'. However, in subsequent episodes, only one point was awarded for each correct answer in order to avoid confusion.

== Episodes ==
The coloured backgrounds denote the result of each of the shows:

– Indicates Richard's team won.
– Indicates Katherine's team won.
– Indicates the game ended in a draw.

=== Pilot (2017) ===
Episode	First broadcast	Richard's guest	Katherine's guest	Scores
Pilot	6 February 2017	Richard Ayoade	Jon Richardson	1,222,337–1,753,613^{1}

1. The points system was changed after the pilot, which is why so many points were scored in this episode.

=== Series 1 (2017) ===
The first two episodes were broadcast on Monday nights, after which the show was moved to Sunday nights.

Episode	First broadcast	Richard's guest	Katherine's guest	Scores
1x01	15 May 2017	Stanley Johnson	Miles Jupp	7-5
1x02	22 May 2017	Robert Rinder	Adil Ray	3-3
1x03	28 May 2017	Desiree Burch	Richard Ayoade	3-1
1x04	4 June 2017	Richard Ayoade (Guest Captain), Steph and Dom Parker	Rhod Gilbert	2-2
