= Richard Osman =

English TV presenter and writer (born 1970)

Richard Osman OBE
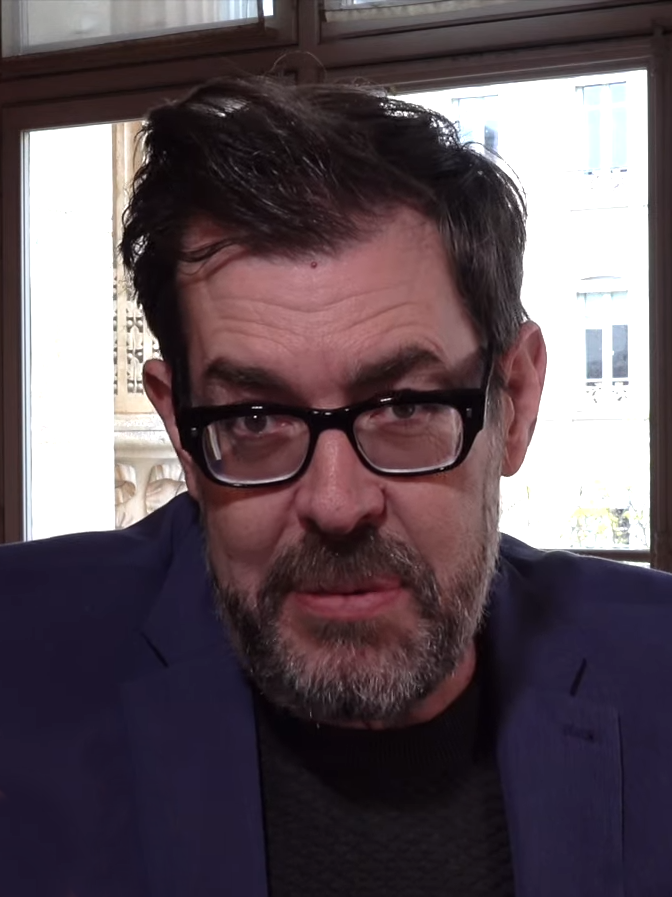
- Osman in 2022
- Born: Richard Thomas Osman; 28 November 1970 (age 55); Billericay, Essex, England
- Education: Warden Park School; University of Cambridge (BA)
- Occupations: Television producer; Television presenter; Novelist
- Years active: 1993–present
- Known for: Pointless; Two Tribes; Insert Name Here; The Fake News Show; Richard Osman's House of Games
- Notable work: Thursday Murder Club
- Height: 6 ft 7 in (2.01 m)
- Spouse: Ingrid Oliver (m. 2022)
- Children: 2
- Relatives: Mat Osman (older brother)

Richard Thomas Osman (born 28 November 1970) is an English television presenter, producer, and novelist. He is the creator and former co-presenter of the BBC One television quiz show Pointless. He has presented the BBC Two quiz shows Two Tribes and Richard Osman's House of Games, and been a team captain on the comedy panel shows Insert Name Here and The Fake News Show. He has also made regular appearances on British comedy panel shows including Would I Lie to You?, QI, Have I Got News for You and Taskmaster.

Osman worked at Hat Trick Productions before becoming creative director of the television production company Endemol UK, producing shows including Prize Island for ITV and Deal or No Deal for Channel 4. He is the author of the best-selling Thursday Murder Club mystery novels.

== Early life and education ==
Richard Thomas Osman was born on 28 November 1970, in Billericay, Essex, to Brenda Wright and David Osman. When he was nine years old, his father walked out on the family, which Osman says created difficulty for the rest of his life. His mother attended teacher training college as a way of supporting her family. His older brother is the musician Mat Osman, bass guitarist of the rock band Suede. The boys grew up in Haywards Heath, West Sussex.

Osman attended Warden Park School in Cuckfield. While still at school, he gained his first broadcasting experience, as a regular contributor to Turn It Up, an open-access music show which went out on Sunday evenings on BBC Radio Sussex.

From 1989 to 1992, Osman studied politics and sociology at the University of Cambridge where he was an undergraduate student at Trinity College, Cambridge, and a contemporary of future Pointless co-presenter Alexander Armstrong.

== Career ==
Osman's career has been in television production, television presenting and as a novelist.

=== TV production ===
Osman worked as executive producer on British gameshows, including Channel 4 comedy panel game 8 Out of 10 Cats and satirical comedy 10 O'Clock Live. He was the creative director at TV company Endemol UK, pitching the idea for Pointless to the BBC, becoming its co-presenter with his former university friend Alexander Armstrong, when it launched in 2009.

Osman created the short-lived 2013 ITV gameshow Prize Island. His other credits include Whose Line Is It Anyway?, Total Wipeout and 24 Hour Quiz.

Osman acted as script editor for BBC One's Total Wipeout. In 1999, he created and wrote the Channel 4 sitcom Boyz Unlimited with David Walliams and Matt Lucas. In 2005, he co-created and co-wrote the animated Channel 4 sitcom Bromwell High.

Osman left Endemol in 2020.

=== TV presenting and Pointless ===
From 2009 until 2022, Osman co-presented the BBC One teatime quiz show Pointless with host Alexander Armstrong. He created the show where he is jokingly known as Armstrong's "pointless friend". Having previously worked exclusively in behind-the-camera roles, Osman got the job as co-presenter/assistant when he pitched the idea for the show to a panel of BBC daytime heads, taking the role of the assistant in the demonstration.

Osman guest hosted Have I Got News for You in October 2013. In 2014, he began presenting a new BBC Two quiz show called Two Tribes. A second series began airing in February 2015. From October 2014, he guest-presented episodes of The One Show. Beginning in 2016, he was a team captain on the BBC Two comedy panel show Insert Name Here, hosted by Sue Perkins. A second series was commissioned to begin airing in January 2017.

In February and December 2016, he presented Dragons' Den: Pitches to Riches, two special episodes which looked back over the past 13 series of Dragons' Den on BBC Two. Since 2016, Osman has presented Child Genius on Channel 4. He appeared on the telethon Red Nose Day 2017 with The World Cup of Biscuits 2017. This involved polling with Twitter to find the best British biscuit. In April 2017 he appeared in the first episode of the third series of Murder in Successville.

In 2017, he began hosting his show Richard Osman's House of Games. Each weekday, four panellists compete in general knowledge tests in a variety of entertaining games. Nine series of the show have been made. In 2020, Osman created a spin-off show titled House of Games Night, which aired on BBC One on Friday nights.

On 8 April 2022, Osman announced he would be leaving Pointless, after 1,300 episodes across 30 series. After his Thursday Murder Club series received critical acclaim, he wished to spend more time as an author. He is, however, continuing to appear on the spin-off Pointless Celebrities. In a statement, he said, "Pointless has been a joy from start to finish, working alongside my friend Alexander Armstrong, backed by the most wonderful team, and for the best viewers in the world. I will miss everyone so much, but I'm thrilled I'll still be presenting the celebrity shows. I can't thank everyone enough for 12 amazing years." He was replaced by a rotating series of guest presenters. His co-host Armstrong said, "Daytime television's loss is international best-selling crime fiction's gain. I say that like it's a consolation—I'm going to miss the big man next to me Monday to Friday. But at least I still get him at weekends—and weekdays if you're watching on Challenge".

In November 2023, Osman began hosting a podcast, The Rest is Entertainment, with Marina Hyde. The success of the podcast led to the two presenters appearing live for a sold out Christmas version of the show at the Royal Albert Hall in December 2024.

In March 2026, Osman announced he would be leaving House of Games. He was replaced by actor Michael Sheen in October 2026.

=== Literary work ===
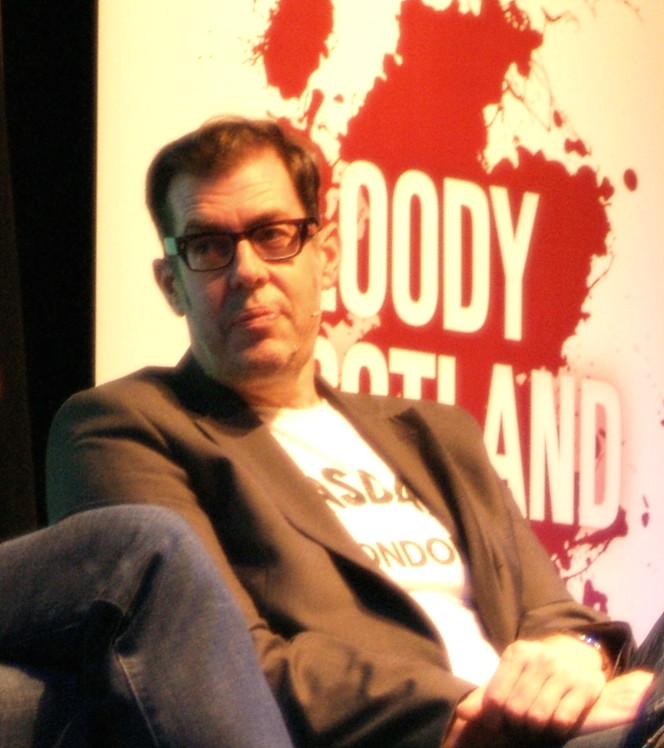
Richard Osman at Bloody Scotland, an international crime writing festival, in 2019

Viking Press, a subsidiary of Penguin Random House, acquired the rights to Osman's debut novel, The Thursday Murder Club, and one other novel, for a seven-figure sum in a 10-publisher auction in 2019. Osman's debut crime novel was published on 3 September 2020.

The Thursday Murder Club series is set in a luxury retirement village in Kent, where four residents with an interest in solving cold cases become involved in real murder investigations. Osman confirmed in August 2020 that Steven Spielberg had acquired the book's film rights and the movie debuted on Netflix in August 2025. The book sold almost 700,000 UK copies in its first four months, according to publishers Penguin, and beat Barack Obama's memoir A Promised Land as the UK's Christmas best-selling book.

The first novel in the series was followed by The Man Who Died Twice in 2021, The Bullet That Missed in 2022, and The Last Devil to Die in 2023. The Last Devil to Die reached number one on the New York Times Best Seller list. The fifth book in the series, The Impossible Fortune, was released in September 2025.

In September 2024, Viking published the first book in Osman's new mystery series, We Solve Murders. The second book in this series, We Chase Shadows, was published on 15 September 2026.

As of 2025, Osman has sold over 17 million books worldwide.

=== Other activities ===
Osman presented The Birthday Game podcast. In 2021 he featured in adverts for premium ready-meal brand Charlie Bigham's.

In December 2021, Osman was the guest for BBC Radio 4's Desert Island Discs.

On 9 June 2022, Osman was the subject of the BBC's Who Do You Think You Are?, in which he discovered that a distant relative had been involved in a celebrated Victorian murder case.

== List of works ==
=== Non-fiction ===
Year	Title	Co-author(s)	Publisher	ISBN
2012	The 100 Most Pointless Things in the World	Alexander Armstrong	Coronet	978-1-4447-6205-1
2013	The 100 Most Pointless Arguments in the World	Alexander Armstrong	Coronet	978-1-4447-6208-2
2014	The Very Pointless Quiz Book	Alexander Armstrong	Coronet	978-1-4447-8274-5
2015	The A-Z of Pointless	Alexander Armstrong	Coronet	978-1-4447-8277-6
2016	A Pointless History of the World	Alexander Armstrong	Coronet	978-1-4736-2324-8
2017	The World Cup Of Everything: Bringing the Fun Home		Coronet	978-1-4736-6726-6
2019	Richard Osman's House of Games	Alan Connor	BBC Books	978-1-78594-462-8

=== Fiction ===
Year	Title	Publisher	ISBN	Notes
2020	The Thursday Murder Club	Viking	978-0-241-42544-2	1st in the Thursday Murder Club series
2021	The Man Who Died Twice	Viking	978-0-241-42542-8	2nd in the Thursday Murder Club series
2022	The Bullet That Missed	Viking	978-0-241-51243-2	3rd in the Thursday Murder Club series
2023	The Last Devil to Die	Viking	978-0-241-51244-9	4th in the Thursday Murder Club series
2024	We Solve Murders	Viking	978-0-593-65322-7	1st in the We Solve Murders series
2025	The Impossible Fortune	Viking	978-0-241-74398-0	5th in the Thursday Murder Club series
2026	We Chase Shadows	Viking	978-0-241-74589-2	2nd in the We Solve Murders series

=== Production credits ===
Year	Title	Role	Channel	Notes
1995	Whose Line Is It Anyway?	Programme associate	Channel 4	12 episodes
1998–1999	If I Ruled the World	Creator, producer	BBC Two	2 series
1999	Boyz Unlimited	Co-creator (with David Walliams and Matt Lucas)	Channel 4	6 episodes
2001	The Adam and Joe Show	Additional material	Channel 4	3 episodes
2004	Ban This Filth	Executive producer	Channel 4	6 episodes
2005	Bromwell High	Writer	Channel 4	12 episodes
2005–2017	8 Out of 10 Cats	Executive producer (41 episodes); Edit producer (1 episode)	Channel 4	42 episodes
2009–2010	You Have Been Watching	Executive producer	Channel 4	15 episodes
2009–2011	Total Wipeout	Script editor (36 episodes); Programme associate (9 episodes)	BBC One	45 episodes
2010	Channel 4's Alternative Election Night	Executive producer	Channel 4	One-off programme
2011–2013	10 O'Clock Live	Executive producer	Channel 4	33 episodes
2012–2018	8 Out of 10 Cats Does Countdown	Executive producer	Channel 4	16 series
2013	Prize Island	Creator	ITV	1 series
2014–2016	Only Connect	Additional questions	BBC Two	5 episodes
2025	The Thursday Murder Club	Executive producer	Netflix	film

=== Presenting roles ===
Year	Title	Role	Channel	Notes
2009–2022	Pointless	Co-presenter	BBC Two (2009–2011); BBC One (2011–2022)	27 series
2011–2026	Pointless Celebrities	Co-presenter	BBC One	13 series
2014–2017	The One Show	Guest presenter	BBC One	7 episodes
2014–2015	Two Tribes	Presenter	BBC Two	2 series
2016	Dragons' Den: Pitches to Riches	Presenter	BBC Two	2 episodes
2016–2019	Child Genius	Presenter	Channel 4	Series 4–
2017	The Nightly Show	Celebrity host	ITV	1 episode
2017	Channel 4's Alternative Election Night	Co-presenter	Channel 4	One-off programme
2017–2026	Richard Osman's House of Games	Presenter	BBC Two	9 series
2018	Re-Play 2018 with Richard Osman	Presenter	ITV	One-off programme
2020	Richard Osman's House of Games Night	Presenter	BBC One	2 series
2023 -	The Rest is Entertainment	Co-Presenter	Podcast	Ongoing

=== Non-presenting appearances ===
Year	Title	Role	Channel	Notes
2012–2016	Strictly Come Dancing: It Takes Two	Panellist	BBC Two	3 episodes
2012–2024	Have I Got News for You	Guest panellist	BBC One	17 episodes plus four highlights specials
2012–2019	Would I Lie to You?	Guest	BBC One	7 episodes
2013	The Big Fat Quiz of the Year	Himself	Channel 4	TV special
2013–2017	8 Out of 10 Cats Does Countdown	Contestant	Channel 4	5 episodes
2013	QI	Guest	BBC Two	4 episodes
2014	Not Going Out	Himself/cameo role	BBC One	1 episode: "Pointless"
2014	Room 101	Guest	BBC One	1 episode
2014	2014 World Snooker Championship	Special guest (1 episode); Potless presenter (3 episodes)	BBC Two	4 episodes
2015	2015 World Snooker Championship	Celebrity predictions (1 episode); Celebrity player (1 episode)	BBC Two	2 episodes
2015	Let's Play Darts	Participant/commentator	BBC Two	Charity series
2015	Danger Mouse	Professor Strontium Jellyfishowitz	CBBC	Voice only
2015	Celebrity Juice	Guest	ITV2	3 episodes
2015	8 Out of 10 Cats	Guest	Channel 4	1 episode
2015–2017	Loose Women	Guest	ITV	3 episodes
2016	Play to the Whistle	Himself	ITV	1 episode
2016	Duck Quacks Don't Echo	Guest	Sky One	1 episode
2016	Taskmaster	Contestant	Dave	Series 2
2016	Eurovision Song Contest 2016	UK spokesperson	BBC One, EBU	Annual programme
2016–2020	The Last Leg	Guest	Channel 4	6 episodes
2016–2020	Insert Name Here	Team captain	BBC Two	3 series
2017	The Fake News Show	Team captain	Channel 4	1 series
2017	Dara O Briain's Go 8 Bit	Contestant	Dave	1 episode
2017	Murder in Successville	Himself	BBC Three	1 episode
2017–2020	Sunday Brunch	Guest	Channel 4	2 episodes
2018	Frankie Boyle's New World Order	Guest	BBC Two	1 episode
2019	Catchphrase	Celebrity contestant	ITV	1 episode
2019	The Ranganation	Guest	BBC Two	1 episode
2019	Jon Richardson: Ultimate Worrier	Himself	Dave	1 episode
2020	Who Wants to Be a Millionaire?	Celebrity contestant	ITV	1 episode
2020	The Graham Norton Show	Himself	BBC One	1 episode
2020	Saturday Kitchen Live	Guest	BBC One	1 episode
2020	Anthony	Himself	BBC One	TV film
2022	Who Do You Think You Are?	Himself	BBC One	1 episode – Shown on 10 June 2022
2022	Saturday Kitchen	Himself	BBC One	1 episode – Shown on 18 September 2022
2022	Celebrity Antiques Road Trip	Celebrity contestant	BBC Two	1 episode – Shown on 28 December 2022
2024	Saturday Kitchen	Guest	BBC One	1 episode – Shown on 21 September 2024

== Personal life ==
Osman was born with nystagmus, an eye condition that significantly reduces his vision. He learns his scripts by heart as his condition makes it difficult to read an autocue. He has had a food addiction since childhood and said that he had therapy for the disorder, but believed that it would be lifelong.

Osman has a daughter and son from a previous relationship. On 3 December 2022, he married Ingrid Oliver whom he met when she was a contestant on Richard Osman's House Of Games. His children walked him down the aisle accompanied by the music of an Eminem song.

On 6 December 2011, Osman won Heat's "Weirdest Crush Award".

As of 2021, Osman was living in Chiswick, West London.

According to Alexander Armstrong, Osman was originally a Southampton F.C. supporter before he switched allegiances, to Fulham F.C. and as of 2013, is a season ticket holder.

Osman is notable for his stature, being 6 feet 7 inches (2.01 m) tall.

== Honours, awards and recognition ==
Osman was appointed Officer of the Order of the British Empire (OBE) in the 2026 New Year Honours for services to literature and broadcasting.

Preceded by Paul Sinha	BBC Radio 5 Live; Fighting Talk Champion of Champions; 2016/17 and 2017/18	Succeeded by Martin Kelner
