= Prize Island =

British television game show

- Created by: Richard Osman
- Directed by: Will Clough
- Presented by: Alexander Armstrong; Emma Willis
- Theme music composer: Marc Sylvan; Richard Jacques
- Country of origin: United Kingdom
- Original language: English
- No. of series: 1
- No. of episodes: 6

Production
- Executive producer: Andy Rowe
- Producer: Emma Taylor
- Production locations: Bazaruto Island, Mozambique
- Running time: 60 minutes (inc. adverts)
- Production company: Initial

Original release
- Network: ITV
- Release: 27 October – 1 December 2013

Related
- Total Wipeout

Prize Island is a British television game show produced by Initial for ITV. The series was presented by Alexander Armstrong and Emma Willis. It was originally aired from 27 October to 1 December 2013 and ran for six episodes.

In June 2013, it was reported that ITV were considering cancelling the show before it had aired a single episode. Sources had said it was supposed to air in the spring, to go up against The Voice UK.

The series was filmed during October 2012 on Bazaruto Island, off the coast of Mozambique.

== Format ==
Bazaruto Island, Mozambique

In each episode, four pairs all with a pre-existing relationship take part in four game "rounds" in order to uncover a series of prizes, from a TV to a holiday package, scattered across a desert island paradise. Over two days round-by-round, one pair leaves the island, as the pile of prizes grows bigger and bigger. The final round, undertaken by the last remaining pair, is titled "Buried Treasure" and contains the grand prize of a brand new car with £50,000 locked in its boot.

== Games ==
Below are a list of games used in the show. Most games are specific to a certain round. Bonus carnival-style games are also played between rounds, such as ring toss, to win extra prizes.

=== First round ===
Games that take place in the first round are played by all four pairs.

- Coconut Superstore
- Walk The Plank
- Message in a Bottle
- Leaving on a Jetty Plane
- Net Trap
- Ship to Shore

=== Second round ===
Games that take place in the second round are played by the three remaining pairs.

- Shipwreck
- Prize Safari
- Mine Swing
- Mine-O-Mite

=== Third round ===
Games of the third round are played by the two remaining pairs, who go head-to-head to get to the final "Buried Treasure" round.

- Swiss Family Plumbing
- Shipwreck
- Coconut Superstore

=== Buried Treasure ===
The final remaining pair play for a chance to win the grand prize of £50,000 and a brand new car.

== Episodes ==
Episode	Airdate	Timeslot	Game 1	Game 2	Game 3	Buried Treasure
1	27 October 2013	17:40	'Coconut Superstore'	'Shipwreck'	'Swiss Family Plumbing'	Won
2	3 November 2013	17:30	'Walk The Plank'	'Prize Safari'	'Shipwreck'	Lost
3	10 November 2013	17:35	'Leaving on a Jetty Plane'	'Mine Swing'	'Shipwreck'	Won
4	17 November 2013	17:35	'Message in a Bottle'	'Shipwreck'	'Swiss Family Plumbing'	Lost
5	24 November 2013	17:35	'Net Trap'	'Shipwreck'	'Coconut Superstore'	Lost
6	1 December 2013	17:40	'Ship to Shore'	'Mine-O-Mite'	'Shipwreck'	Won

== Ratings ==
The first episode drew 1.5 million viewers between 5:40 pm and 6:35 pm, down 32% on the slot average.
