= The Man Who Died Twice (novel) =

2021 novel by Richard Osman

- Author: Richard Osman
- Language: English
- Series: Thursday Murder Club
- Genre: Crime
- Set in: Kent, England
- Publisher: Viking Press
- Publication date: 16 September 2021
- Publication place: United Kingdom
- Pages: 464
- ISBN: 9780241425428
- Preceded by: The Thursday Murder Club
- Followed by: The Bullet That Missed

The Man Who Died Twice is a murder mystery written by the British comedian and presenter Richard Osman. It is the sequel to The Thursday Murder Club and was published by Penguin Random House's Viking Press in September 2021 and as an audiobook, read by Lesley Manville, in November 2021.

== Background ==
Following the publication of The Thursday Murder Club, Osman said that he had decided to continue writing due to its success outside the United Kingdom, saying, "I was very worried about that thing, 'Oh it's a celebrity writing a novel', which, of course, is one of the worst phrases in the English language." His mother, who lives in a retirement home like the characters, had initially worried that the previous book had contained elements of her indiscretion; after discovering that was not the case, she reported enjoying the sequel a lot more, having read The Thursday Murder Club "in a blind panic".

== Characters and plot ==
Like The Thursday Murder Club, the plot revolves around a quartet of pensioners living in Kent who solve murders: Elizabeth, Ron, Ibrahim, and Joyce. When composing the team, Osman had said he was inspired by the television show The A-Team, which he had watched in his youth. Elizabeth Best, the leader of the group, is a former MI6 agent; Ron Ritchie is a former trade union leader; Ibrahim Arif is a retired Egyptian psychiatrist; Joyce Meadowcroft is a retired nurse.

Soon after Elizabeth's former husband, Douglas Middlemiss, a secret service agent, breaks into the home of a criminal banker, Martin Lomax, £20 million of diamonds go missing from the same house, with the banker suspecting Douglas; The banker threatens to give the diamonds' owners, mobsters from New York and cartel members from Colombia, details on Elizabeth's ex-husband should the diamonds not be returned. Ibrahim is assaulted during a street robbery, causing him to suffer depression and seek seclusion. A lack of evidence prevents the police from acting and the other club members seek retribution themselves.

== Reception ==
While calling The Man Who Died Twice "superbly entertaining", Lynne Truss of The Guardian criticised the novel's lack of a "sense of jeopardy", with Jake Kerridge of The Daily Telegraph agreeing. Tom Nolan of The Wall Street Journal called it "an unalloyed delight, full of sharp writing, sudden surprises, heart, comedy, sorrow and great banter", with Michael Dirda of The Washington Post calling the book "wildly entertaining".

Robert Dex of the Evening Standard had mixed thoughts on the novel, writing that the plot "has more holes than a dodgy knitting pattern and his characters – aside from Elizabeth and her sidekick Joyce – are pretty flimsy." However, he stated: "As a reviewer I can find plenty of faults, but as a reader I didn't care", having "read it from cover to cover and enjoyed every minute." Joan Smith of The Sunday Times was harsher, calling the plot "so hackneyed that it is hard to read without yawning." She went further, lambasting Osman as "very much a one-trick pony", his characters as "paper-thin", and scorching both of his "soap opera" books as "lack[ing] the underlying moral seriousness that is an essential ingredient of the best crime fiction." She further accused Osman of "not tak[ing] murder seriously, dispatching characters with careless abandon".

=== Theme of aging ===
The Man Who Died Twice focuses on the theme of age, with Osman saying that he did not want to patronise the elderly. He further revealed that he had tried to focus on mortality in a "refreshing and possibly even calming" way.

Truss stated that the "comedy in The Man Who Died Twice allows for all its characters to be alert to sobering realities: of time running out; of losing loved ones to death or dementia; of feeling physically unsafe in the modern world; of grown-up children finding you stupid and tiresome." Kerridge wrote that "Osman manages to keep the novel rooted in truth by focusing on his central characters' everyday concerns as well as their hair-raising adventures: Elizabeth's heroic stoicism in the face of her husband's encroaching dementia; Joyce's circular rows with the daughter she'd die for but doesn't much like."

Praising the characters, Dirda wrote that the Thursday Murder Club were "ordinary old people yet, like all old people, much deeper and complicated than they appear". Smith, however, criticised the lack of realism in Osman's portrayal, highlighting that the Club were "in their seventies or eighties, but retain all their faculties and do not appear to have any financial problems as they run rings around the police."

== Publication ==
Following publication on 16 September 2021 by Viking, The Man Who Died Twice became one of the best-performing novels since records began in the 1990s, selling 114,202 copies in the first three days it was available; this led an industry analyst to call Osman a "publishing phenomenon". However, a prominent books magazine, led by Rolling Stone's former editor, refused to review it, saying that "there are hundreds of new books published every week" and there was an "illusion" that only two books (The Man Who Died Twice and Beautiful World, Where Are You) were on sale, pleading for its readers to "[f]ocus instead on the mountain of other stuff that has been magically made to disappear".

The audiobook, released by Penguin Audio in November 2021, won both Crimefest's Sounds of Crime Award in 2022, and the AudioFile Earphones Award.

== Sequels ==
The Man Who Died Twice was followed by The Bullet That Missed, the third book in the Thursday Murder Club series. This book released on 15 September 2022 and was well-received, being mentioned as a New York Times best-seller. The next sequel was The Last Devil to Die, published on 12 September 2023.
