= Happy Birthday BBC Two =

- Genre: Entertainment
- Narrated by: Lorraine Ashbourne
- Country of origin: United Kingdom
- Original language: English

Production
- Producers: Clare Finnett; Mark Turnbull; Lucy Kenwright
- Cinematography: Jeremy Hewson
- Editors: Michael Duly; James Calderwood; Pete Drinkwater; Alex Muggleton
- Running time: 180 minutes

Original release
- Network: BBC Two
- Release: 20 April 2004

Happy Birthday BBC Two is a British entertainment television film that was first broadcast on BBC Two on 20 April 2004 to commemorate the channel's 40th birthday. The film was broadcast again from 16 to 24 April 2014 for the channel's 50th birthday in 2014.

== Reception ==
=== Ratings ===
Happy Birthday BBC Two was watched by 2.43 million viewers on 20 April 2004.

=== Critical reception ===
Digital Spy and The Guardian recommended watching the 2014 edition of Happy Birthday BBC Two, which was split into four parts.
