= 24 Hour Quiz =

British game show

- Genre: Game show
- Created by: Richard Osman
- Presented by: Shaun Williamson; Matt Brown (late night shows)
- Country of origin: United Kingdom
- Original language: English
- No. of series: 1
- No. of episodes: 105

Production
- Producer: Richard Osman
- Production location: Three Mills Studios, London
- Running time: 30-60 minutes
- Production company: Endemol UK

Original release
- Network: ITV
- Release: 16 February – 2 April 2004

24 Hour Quiz is a British game show that was broadcast on ITV between 16 February and 2 April 2004, presented by Shaun Williamson and Matt Brown and created by Richard Osman for Endemol UK.

Three people lived together in the "Quiz Pod", and faced multiple choice questions for at least 16 hours per day, with £1 (sometimes more) won per correct answer. The programme was spread across three different shows each day (except weekends) on ITV1. Firstly, a half-hour show at 1pm in which fourteen contestants were whittled down to seven in head-to-head knockout battles, in which the first one to give a wrong answer was eliminated. Then, in the main show at 5pm, the seven contestants contested a series of further elimination rounds, the winner going up against the worst performing player from the Quiz Pod in the two hours before transmission in a head-to-head contest. Each contestant had four Quiz Pod Passes and could pick one to swipe every time they got a question right, the first one to swipe a pass that lit green won the contest - if it was the Pod Player, they got to return to the Pod, but if the studio contestant won, they would take their place in the Quiz Pod and the ejected Pod Player left the show, taking away the money that they had won during their stay. Both these two shows were hosted by Williamson.

The third and final show of the day was presented by Brown, and had varying times, but usually aired at around 11:30pm. This was known as the Pod Party, with questions worth double money and often had a fancy dress theme. Between the quizzing, Brown would regularly chat to the contestants as the show progressed, as well as showing unseen content from the past 24 hours inside the pod, which often featured footage considered unsuitable for the earlier 5pm broadcast.

ITV2 broadcast a daily live stream from the Quiz Pod during the daytime hours throughout the course of the show's run. One such notable incident occurred in which one contestant, Michael Parkinson (no relation to the chat show host of the same name), was removed from the programme after constant threatening behaviour when in the pod. He was allowed to keep his winnings.

Originally scheduled for a seven-week run, the show was pulled after five weeks due to poor viewing figures and perceived criticism from support groups over the nature of the programme.

In a piece for The Guardian on 26 October 2012, Osman deemed 24 Hour Quiz to be one of the worst British game shows of all time, describing it as having "[married] the mind-numbing tedium of a second-rate reality show, with the plodding boredom of a sub-standard pub quiz."
