= The Thursday Murder Club (soundtrack) =

The Thursday Murder Club (Soundtrack from the Netflix Film)

Film score by Thomas Newman
- Released: 28 August 2025
- Recorded: 2025
- Studio: Abbey Road Studios, London
- Genre: Film score
- Length: 40:36
- Label: Netflix Music
- Producer: Thomas Newman; Bill Bernstein

Thomas Newman chronology
White Bird (2024)	The Thursday Murder Club (2025)	In the Blink of an Eye (2026)

The Thursday Murder Club (Soundtrack from the Netflix Film) is the film score soundtrack to the 2025 film The Thursday Murder Club directed by Chris Columbus, starring Helen Mirren, Pierce Brosnan, Ben Kingsley and Celia Imrie. The score is composed by Thomas Newman and conducted by Ben Parry. It was released through Netflix Music on 28 August 2025.

== Background ==
Thomas Newman composed the film score to The Thursday Murder Club in November 2024, marking his first collaboration with Columbus. The score was recorded at the Abbey Road Studios in London, mixed by Shinnosuke Miyazawa and mastered by Dave Collins. The album was released through Netflix Music on 28 August 2025.

== Reception ==
Filmtracks wrote that "The Thursday Murder Club is a fairly brief but effortless listening experience [...] The excellent final two tracks in particular are optimistic, rhythmic Newman expressions at their finest." James Southall of Movie Wave noted that "Newman fans will lap it up regardless and others should find plenty to like, but it's not a top-tier effort." Manuel Betancourt of Variety called it a "sprightly if familiar-sounding score". Dominic Maxwell of The Times mentioned that, "The music, by Thomas Newman adds a pulsing quality to its genteel strings." Alex Maidy of JoBlo.com wrote that Newman's score and cinematography help "The Thursday Murder Club look like a big-screen movie despite debuting on a streaming platform." Vicky Jessop of London Evening Standard called it a "sentimental score – even if the dialogue veers towards the clunky at times."

== Track listing ==
No.	Title	Length
1.	"The Woman in White"	1:15
2.	"The Thursday Murder Club"	1:41
3.	"The Arm in the Mirror"	1:50
4.	"Jumper"	0:51
5.	"My Mother's Name"	1:08
6.	"DI Penny Gray"	2:10
7.	"The Enemy Approaches"	1:02
8.	"WTF"	1:06
9.	"Scrum"	1:22
10.	"Witnesses to a Murder"	2:06
11.	"Aunt Maude"	0:34
12.	"Night Flowers"	1:39
13.	"Clever Daughter"	0:48
14.	"Cheap Trick"	0:33
15.	"Headstones"	1:45
16.	"A Woodpecker"	0:43
17.	"Don't Wake the Dead"	3:22
18.	"Four Sugars"	2:12
19.	"The Case of Angela Hughes"	3:17
20.	"What a Chase"	2:25
21.	"Good People Bad Things"	1:39
22.	"Always Bring Cake"	1:51
23.	"The Famous Coppers Chase"	2:36
24.	"Blood Roses"	2:52
Total length:		40:36

== Additional music ==
The following songs are featured in the film, but not included in the soundtrack:

- "Disco Inferno" by the Trammps
- "Bang A Gong (Get It On)" by T. Rex
- "Power to the People" by John Lennon
- "LoveDrug" by Lady Gaga
- "Wild World" by Cat Stevens
- "Oh Very Young" by Cat Stevens
