= Jason Gwynne =

British journalist

Jason Gwynne is a journalist, most widely known for his 2004 documentary on the British National Party (BNP). The documentary was based on undercover footage gathered by Gwynne who posed as a football hooligan looking to get involved in far-right politics.
