= The Impossible Fortune =

2025 murder mystery book

- First edition
- Author: Richard Osman
- Audio read by: Fiona Shaw
- Series: Thursday Murder Club (series)
- Publisher: Viking Press
- Publication date: September 30, 2025
- ISBN: 9780593653258
- Preceded by: The Last Devil to Die

The Impossible Fortune is the fifth murder mystery book in the Thursday Murder Club series, written by British author and television presenter, Richard Osman. The book and its audiobook edition, read by Fiona Shaw, were published by Viking Press in September 2025.

== Characters ==
The main characters are four pensioners who reside at the fictional Coopers Chase retirement village in Kent, England:

- Elizabeth Best, an ex-spy
- Ron Ritchie, a former trade union leader
- Ibrahim Arif, a psychiatrist
- Joyce Meadowcroft, a retired nurse

Familiar supporting characters include:

- Donna De Freitas, police constable
- Chris Hudson, detective chief inspector
- Bogdan Jankowski, handyman and Donna's partner
- Jason Ritchie, Ron's son
- Kendrick, Ron's grandson
- Joanna, Joyce's daughter
- Connie Johnson, drug dealer
- Alan, Joyce's pet dog

== Plot ==
When the best man approaches Elizabeth for help during Joyce’s daughter’s wedding, the Thursday Murder Club becomes involved in a case involving a disappearance, a murder, and codes related to an extremely valuable bitcoin holding. Alongside the main investigation, Ron deals with family problems and Ibrahim continues his work with recent parolee Connie Johnson.

== Reception ==
The book debuted at No. 1 on The Sunday Times Bestseller list and reached No. 1 on The New York Times Best Seller list for combined print and e-book fiction. Critics praised the storytelling as well as the relationships between the characters. In her Library Journal review, Liz French wrote, "The crime, though ingeniously plotted, with many red herrings, is not the main attraction. It’s the growing love and respect among the Thursdays and their kith and kin, including a few criminals and cops, that is the biggest draw."
