= The Last Devil to Die =

Richard Osman novel

- Author: Richard Osman
- Audio read by: Fiona Shaw
- Genre: Mystery, Crime fiction
- Publisher: Viking Press
- Publication date: 2023
- ISBN: 978-0-593-29942-5
- Preceded by: The Bullet That Missed
- Followed by: The Impossible Fortune

The Last Devil to Die is the fourth book in the Thursday Murder Club series, written by Richard Osman. The book and its audiobook edition, narrated by Fiona Shaw, were published in September 2023, by Viking Press.

== Characters ==
Joyce, Elizabeth, Ron, and Ibrahim, consistent with previous Thursday Murder Club books, are the main characters. The book also features recurring secondary characters:

- Donna and Chris, police officers from the fictional local town of Fairhaven.
- Bogdan, local builder and Donna's boyfriend (as of book 3).
- Stephen, Elizabeth's husband.
- Connie Johnson, drug dealer.

== Plot ==
The book opens with the murder of Kuldesh Sharma, an antiques dealer and friend of Stephen who helped the group solve their previous case. The Thursday Murder Club investigates connections to the antiques trade, art forgery, and drug trafficking. While Elizabeth focuses on Stephen’s declining health, Joyce, Ron, and Ibrahim take the lead in solving the mystery.

== Reception ==
The book debuted at No. 1 on The New York Times Best Sellers list. In its first week of sales, The Last Devil to Die became the fastest-selling hardback title by a British author to date.
