= Ali Abbasi (television host) =

- Born: 6 August 1961; Karachi, Pakistan
- Died: 30 July 2004 (aged 42); Glasgow, Scotland
- Employer: BBC Scotland

Ali Abbasi (Urdu: علی عباسی; August 6, 1961 – July 30, 2004) was a Pakistani-born Scottish television presenter.

== Biography ==
Ali Abbasi was born in Karachi on 6 August 1961. He moved from Pakistan to Glasgow in 1962 with his parents as a child. Abbasi first appeared on BBC Scotland as a travel presenter in the 1980s. He went on to publish numerous books and became a champion for the Gaelic language, appearing in the Gaelic children's series Dè a-nis? and the comedy series Air ais air an Ran Dan ("Back on the Ran Dan").

He joined BBC Scotland as a travel presenter in 1994 from Glasgow City Council, where he worked as an art gallery assistant. As well as presenting travel news at the BBC, Abbasi worked as an audio technician with outside broadcasts and radio cars.

He was appointed Gaelic reading champion by the Scottish Executive in 2003.

Abbasi died in Glasgow of lupus on 30 July 2004.

== Bibliography ==
- Ali & Munsif Abbasi's No Worry Curries
