= The Bullet That Missed =

2022 Richard Osman novel

- Author: Richard Osman
- Audio read by: Fiona Shaw
- Genre: Mystery, Crime fiction
- Publisher: Viking Press
- Publication date: 2022
- Media type: Print, e-book, audiobook
- ISBN: 9780593299418
- Preceded by: The Man Who Died Twice
- Followed by: The Last Devil to Die

The Bullet That Missed is the third murder mystery book in the Thursday Murder Club series, written by British author and television presenter, Richard Osman. The book and its audiobook edition, read by Fiona Shaw, were published by Viking Press in September 2022.

== Characters ==
The main characters are four pensioners who reside at the fictional Coopers Chase retirement village:

- Elizabeth Best, an ex-spy
- Ron Ritchie, a former trade union leader
- Ibrahim Arif, a psychiatrist
- Joyce Meadowcroft, a retired nurse

Supporting characters include:

- Police Constable Donna De Freitas
- Detective Chief Inspector Chris Hudson
- Builder, Bogdan Jankowski
- Drug dealer Connie Johnson

== Plot ==
The Thursday Murder Club reopens the cold case of a journalist who died while exposing a multimillion-dollar fraud scheme. Their search intertwines with Elizabeth’s secret past, threatening the safety of her friends at Coopers Chase.

== Reception ==
The book debuted at number three on The New York Times Best Seller list and was the UK's bestselling hardcover book of 2022, according to The Sunday Times.

Reviewers commenting on Osman's funny and heartwarming writing.
