= Thursday Murder Club (series) =

Book series by Richard Osman

The Thursday Murder Club
- The Thursday Murder Club (2020); The Man Who Died Twice (2021); The Bullet That Missed (2022); The Last Devil to Die (2023); The Impossible Fortune (2025)
- Author: Richard Osman
- Country: United Kingdom
- Language: English
- Genre: Crime fiction, detective fiction, murder mystery, cozy mystery
- Publisher: Viking Press
- Published: 3 September 2020–present
- No. of books: 5

The Thursday Murder Club is a murder mystery book series by television presenter and author Richard Osman.

== Background ==
The first instalment, entitled The Thursday Murder Club, was Osman's fiction writing debut, and was published in September 2020. The book received great critical and public acclaim, and was a great financial success, becoming the No. 1 bestselling Christmas title in the UK, a first for a debut novelist. The subsequent entries in the series have been similarly well received, with The Last Devil To Die ending up as No. 1 on The New York Times Best Seller list on 8 October 2023 and The Impossible Fortune debuted as No. 1 on The Sunday Times Bestseller list on 4 October 2025.

== Character overview ==
The club of the title consists of four elderly pensioners who reside in Coopers Chase, a retirement village located in the fictional Kent village of Fairhaven. The club was initially formed to merely discuss unsolved cases, but the four invariably come to be involved in investigating actual local murders.

The group consists of former spy Elizabeth Best, ex-union leader Ron Ritchie, retired nurse Joyce Meadowcroft, and psychiatrist Ibrahim Arif.

Supporting characters include Detective Chief Inspector Chris Hudson and Police Constable Donna De Freitas; Elizabeth's husband Stephen, who has dementia; and handyman Bogdan Jankowski. In 2024, Osman told author Lee Child that Bogdan was inspired by the author's Jack Reacher character.

== Books in the series ==
1. The Thursday Murder Club (2020)
2. The Man Who Died Twice (2021)
3. The Bullet That Missed (2022)
4. The Last Devil to Die (2023)
5. The Impossible Fortune (2025)

== Adaptations ==
=== Film ===
A film adaptation of the first book was released on Netflix 27 August 2025 via Steven Spielberg's Amblin Entertainment, with a script from Katy Brand, and Chris Columbus as director. The film has an ensemble cast led by Helen Mirren as Elizabeth, Pierce Brosnan as Ron, Ben Kingsley as Ibrahim and Celia Imrie as Joyce.

=== Theatre ===
On 24 May 2024, Osman announced on the podcast The Rest Is Entertainment that he was working on a Thursday Murder Club stage play with co-writer Tom Basden. As with the film, Steven Spielberg and Amblin will produce. Instead of adapting one of the books, the play will be an original story.
